= A Piñata Named Desire =

- American Dad! episode
- Episode no.: Season 7 Episode 11
- Directed by: Bob Bowen
- Written by: Chris McKenna; Matt McKenna
- Production code: 5AJN07
- Original air date: February 13, 2011

Guest appearances
- Lucy Lawless as Stacy; Terry Crews as Ronnie

Episode chronology
← Previous "Stanny Boy and Frantastic"	Next → "You Debt Your Life"
- American Dad! season 7

"A Piñata Named Desire" is the eleventh episode of the seventh season of the animated comedy series American Dad!. It first aired on Fox in the United States on February 13, 2011. This episode mainly centers on Roger and Stan, who begin to experience tensions growing against each other for the dominant figure in the house. Roger becomes tired of Stan's stance as the authoritarian figure of the house, and he challenges Stan's leadership qualities. Stan insists that he is better than Roger at everything, and he tells him that he has a mission that involves acting. Unknown to Stan, Roger spies on him, only to find out that Stan is a terrible actor. Roger later boasts to the house that he is a better actor than Stan, but he eventually teaches him to improve his acting skills. Meanwhile, Steve and his friends plan to throw their last slumber party together.

This episode was written by Chris and Matt McKenna and directed by Bob Bowen, with Jacob Hair as the assistant director. It received highly positive reviews from television critics and fans alike upon its initial airing. The episode was viewed by over 3.94 million viewers upon its initial airing, and it garnered a 1.9 rating in the 18-49 demographic, according to the Nielson ratings. It featured guest appearances from Lucy Lawless and Terry Crews, as well as several recurring voice actors and actresses for the show.

== Plot ==
Roger auditions for a new play entitled "Piñata Man" and begins boasting about his acting ability, infuriating Stan. Stan insists that he's a better actor and is still the "top dog" in the house. Francine gets frustrated with their constant fighting. At the same time, Hayley attributes it to sexual tension. Roger, disbelieving the story, follows Stan to work and sees that he is indeed acting as a waiter in a CIA sting. However, he finds that Stan is a terrible actor, unable to even offer water to the patrons convincingly and causing the sting to turn sour, resulting in the deaths of several agents.

Back home, Roger taunts Stan over his failure and Stan finally admits that he can't act. Stan asks Roger for help, and Roger refers him to acting coach Irwin Beyer Jr. (who, as Stan correctly predicts, is another of Roger's personas.) Stan shows progress by acting out a scene from WarGames by relating it to his acting inability, but refuses to perform the love scene with Roger as the "leading lady". At the casting call for "Piñata Man", the title role goes to Stan, who reveals that he took the acting lessons so he could steal the role right out from under Roger and reassert his dominance.

On Opening Night, Roger injures the leading lady and her understudy so he can claim the role as an actress named Cleshawn Montague and show up Stan. The performance devolves into the pair desperately trying to outdo one another, damaging the set and turning a scene into an impromptu battle rap. When they come to the love scene, Roger is confident that Stan won't be able to kiss him, but Stan gets over his disgust and does so; this leads to another battle of one-upmanship as they perform increasingly raunchy sexual acts until finally they're both arrested for public indecency for simulating sexual intercourse on stage. In the police car, Stan and Roger have become friends again, complimenting each other's acting talent, much to the confusion of Francine and with Hayley reaffirming what she said at the start of the episode.

Meanwhile, Steve and his friends plan to have a slumber party together. Vince Chung and the rest of the school students overhear and make fun of them, and Steve's friends think they are too old to have a slumber party. Steve later suggests this be the last sleepover he and his friends will ever have. At a local pizzeria, Steve and his friends get into an argument over details, including a moment where Toshi tells Snot to "eat his bowls" after he screams at him to learn English. Ultimately, they hold a sleepover at Steve's treehouse, reuniting with the alleged 5th group member who moved away years ago. Steve suspects he is a stranger who overheard them in the pizzeria, but they let him participate anyway.

== Production ==
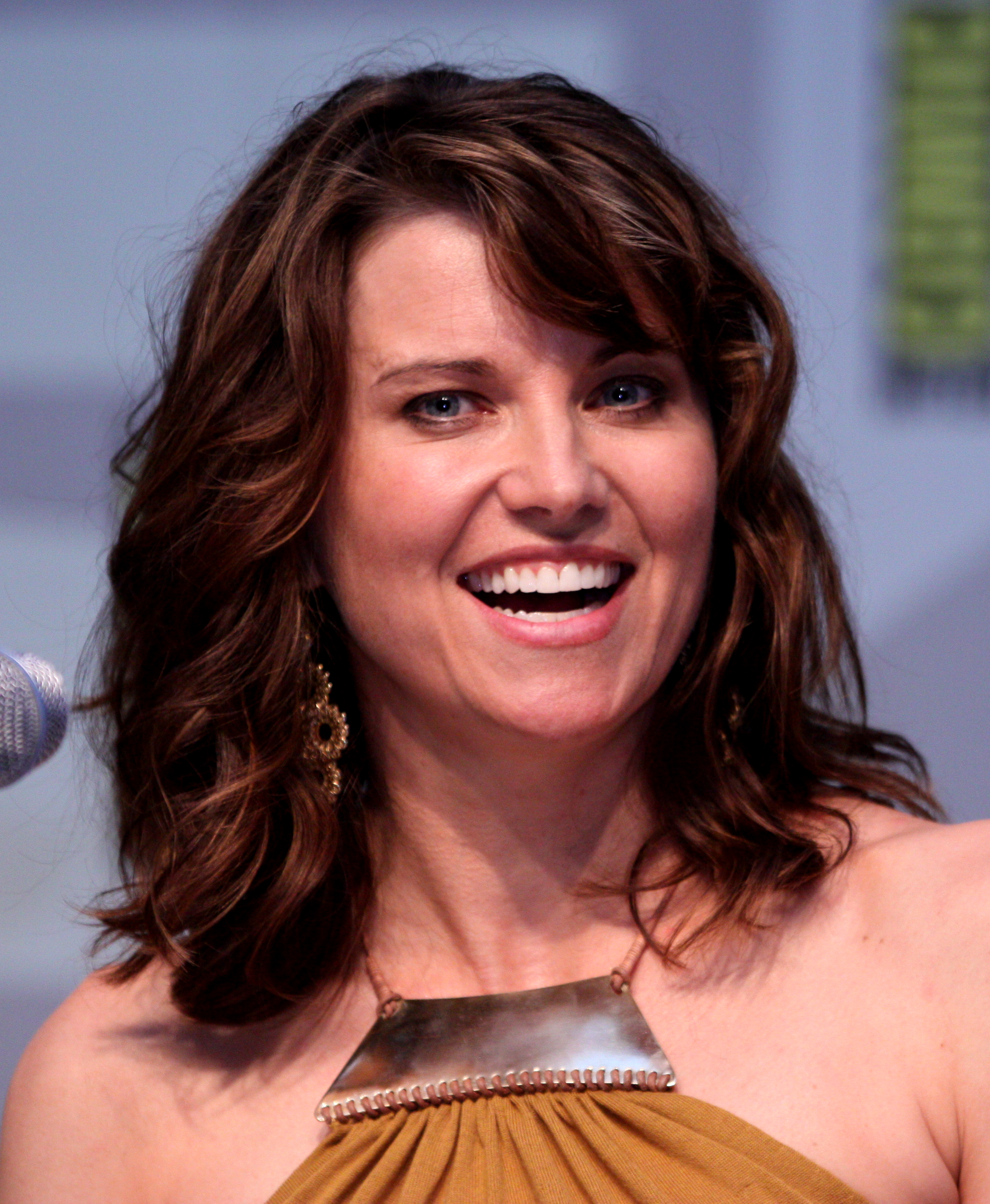
Lucy Lawless made a guest appearance on the episode

"A Piñata Named Desire" was written by series regulars Chris and Matt McKenna, in their second episode of the season. This would be the first episode that both writers would write since the season six episode "Fart-break Hotel". This episode was directed by series regular Bob Bowen, with Jacob Hair as the assistant director. This would be the third time Bowen has directed an episode for the season, having also directed season six episode "For Whom the Sleigh Bell Tolls" and "White Rice". Seth MacFarlane, the creator and executive producer of American Dad!, as well as its sister shows Family Guy and The Cleveland Show, served as the executive producer for the episode, along with series veterans Mike Barker, Rick Wiener, Matt Weitzman, and Kenny Schwartz. Diana Retchey was the animation producer for the episode, in her seventh episode of the season. She has also been the animation producers for many Cartoon Network shows, such as Johnny Bravo and Samurai Jack. Amanda Bell served as the production manager, while Michael Wittenberg would serve as the post-production supervisor for the episode. This would be Bell's eighth episode of the season where she served as the production manager, while this would be Wittenberg's ninth episode of the season as the post-production supervisor.

This episode featured a guest appearance from Lucy Lawless, who provided the voice for Stacy. Recurring voice actors Curtis Armstrong, Daisuke Suzuki and Eddie Kaye Thomas guest starred as Steve's friends in the episode. Armstrong previously reprised his role in "Stan's Food Restaurant", while Suzuki and Thomas reprised their roles in "Best Little Horror House in Langley Falls".

== Reception ==
"A Piñata Named Desire" was broadcast on February 13, 2011, as part of the animation television night on Fox. The show started off the line up, the third consecutive week that American Dad started off Fox's "Animation Domination" block. It was followed by The Simpsons, Bob's Burgers, and its sister shows Family Guy and The Cleveland Show. It was viewed by 3.94 million viewers upon its original airing, despite airing simultaneously with Dateline NBC, 60 Minutes on CBS, and America's Funniest Home Videos on ABC. It achieved a 1.9 rating in the 18-49 demographic, the lowest rating of the line up. The episode's total viewership and ratings were significantly down from the previous episode, "Stanny Boy and Frantastic", which was viewed by 4.80 million viewers upon its initial airing, and garnered a 2.2 rating in the 18-49 demographic.

"A Piñata Named Desire" was met with highly positive reception by television critics and fans alike upon its initial release. Rowan Kaiser of The A.V. Club gave the episode a very positive review, saying the show "is back in fine form tonight, something notable from the start when they bypass a full credit sequence in favor of a simple title card." Kaiser highly praised the main plot, calling the interaction between Stan and Roger "fantastic throughout." However, he wrote a mixed review about the secondary plot of the episode, suggesting that Steve's idea to plan a "sleepover to end all sleepovers" with his friends is "a pretty typical sitcom plot for adolescents". Furthermore, "American Dad adds nothing new except more self-blowjob-attempt jokes. It's not terrible, and if nothing else, it highlights just how good the Roger/Stan [...] storyline is. Despite his criticisms, he rated the episode an A−, the highest grade of the night, scoring higher than The Simpsons episode "The Blue and the Gray", the Bob's Burgers episode "Sexy Dance Fighting", the Family Guy episode "Friends of Peter G., and The Cleveland Show episode "A Short Story and a Tall Tale". Jason Hughes of TV Squad also gave the episode a positive review, calling it "funny". He praised the main plot, find it hilarious when "seeing Stan completely screw up a mission because he's not as good at acting as Roger is." As for Roger's acting in the episode, he says "it should have been obvious that he's a natural," especially when "he even has boobs when he plays women."
