= Jenny Fromdabloc =

- American Dad! episode
- Episode no.: Season 7 Episode 16
- Directed by: Bobby Bowen
- Written by: Laura McCreary
- Production code: 6AJN08
- Original air date: April 17, 2011

Guest appearances
- Edward Asner as Red Mailbox; Carl Reiner as Blue Mailbox

Episode chronology
← Previous "License to Till"	Next → "Home Wrecker"
- American Dad! season 7

"Jenny Fromdabloc" (spelled "Jenny Frömdabloc" on the DVD release) is the sixteenth episode of the seventh season of the animated comedy series American Dad!. The episode first aired on Fox, in the United States, on April 17, 2011. This episode mainly centers around Steve, who tries to comfort his friend, Snot, after facing rejection from Hayley. Snot goes into a deep state of depression after realizing that Hayley does not have any feelings for him. Steve devises a plan that requires Roger to impersonate a teenage girl from New Jersey. Roger ends up developing a deeper relationship with Snot, much to the frustration of Steve. He begins to feel threatened, as Snot develops into a charismatic and arrogant individual that Steve's friends look up to. Meanwhile, Stan wishes to live a more urbane lifestyle and starts drinking martinis, but his low alcohol tolerance causes him to pass out on several occasions and run around Langley Falls in a drunk tangent.

This episode was directed by Bob Bowen and written by Laura McCreary. It received critical acclaim from many television critics, with much of the praise stemming from the main storyline and the cultural references. According to the Nielsen ratings, the episode was viewed by 4.70 million viewers and garnered a 2.2 rating in the 18-49 demographic during its initial airing. It featured guest appearances from Edward Asner and Carl Reiner, as well as several recurring voice actors and actresses for the series.

== Plot ==
10 years ago, Snot developed a crush on Hayley, which has persisted to the present day. While Steve proposes to his friends the idea of tasting 31 ice cream flavors at Baskin-Robbins, Snot professes his love for Hayley, despite her marriage to Jeff Fischer. Hayley rejects Snot, leaving him depressed, so Steve and Roger devise a plan to cheer him up. Roger creates a new persona: Steve's teenage cousin from New Jersey, Jenny Fromdabloc. Snot falls in love with her at a video arcade, where Steve, Toshi, and Barry all leave the two alone to connect. The next day, at Pearl Bailey High School, Snot announces to Steve and his friends that he and his date went to the beach and had sex there, much to Steve's horror.

Back home, Steve becomes outraged at Roger, and the two fight constantly over Snot's increasingly raunchy relationship with Jenny. Steve is also dismayed that Snot is now de facto leader of their friend group due to his relationship, and Barry and Toshi agree with Snot's suggestion to go to a theme park called Wild West Land instead of Steve's idea. Eventually, Steve finds Roger washing a stress ball he used for a businessman persona. Steve questions Roger on why he is cleaning it, and realizes Roger is using it to simulate sex with Snot. Steve spills the news at the Wild West Land amusement park to Snot, showing the stress ball as proof. Devastated, Snot ends his relationship with Jenny, which also upsets Roger.

Steve again announces his original 31 flavors idea, but Snot remains depressed from his broken relationship. Seeing that Roger also misses their relationship, Steve devises another idea to get him and Roger back together without having sex. As Roger (as Jenny) meets Snot again and apologizes for his past actions, Snot accepts him back into their relationship again, moments before Jenny gets hit and killed by a bus. Snot is once again dismayed until Steve mentions that Snot has gotten closer to having sex with someone than anyone in the group. Roger shows up momentarily as the businessman to pay respects, and reveals to Steve how he faked his death: he can move "really, really fast." Roger set up a decoy of Jenny right before the bus hit (and texted Bob Saget). Roger then uses his ability to steal Steve's underwear and sell it. The episode ends with Steve being tempted to "use" the stress ball.

Meanwhile, Stan decides to live life like a man from the 1960s after watching an episode of Bewitched. When he wants to start drinking martinis, Francine objects since he cannot handle his alcohol. She gives him a chance anyway, only to subsequently chase him running down the street in only his underwear and witness him destroy a mailbox while attempting to vault over it. Francine then disbars the arrangement, but Stan decides to get drunk again, causing him to reminisce on his time in the fifth grade fondly, then pass out repeatedly. He believes that Francine is a witch when the people and objects around him "change," unaware of time passing.

== Production ==
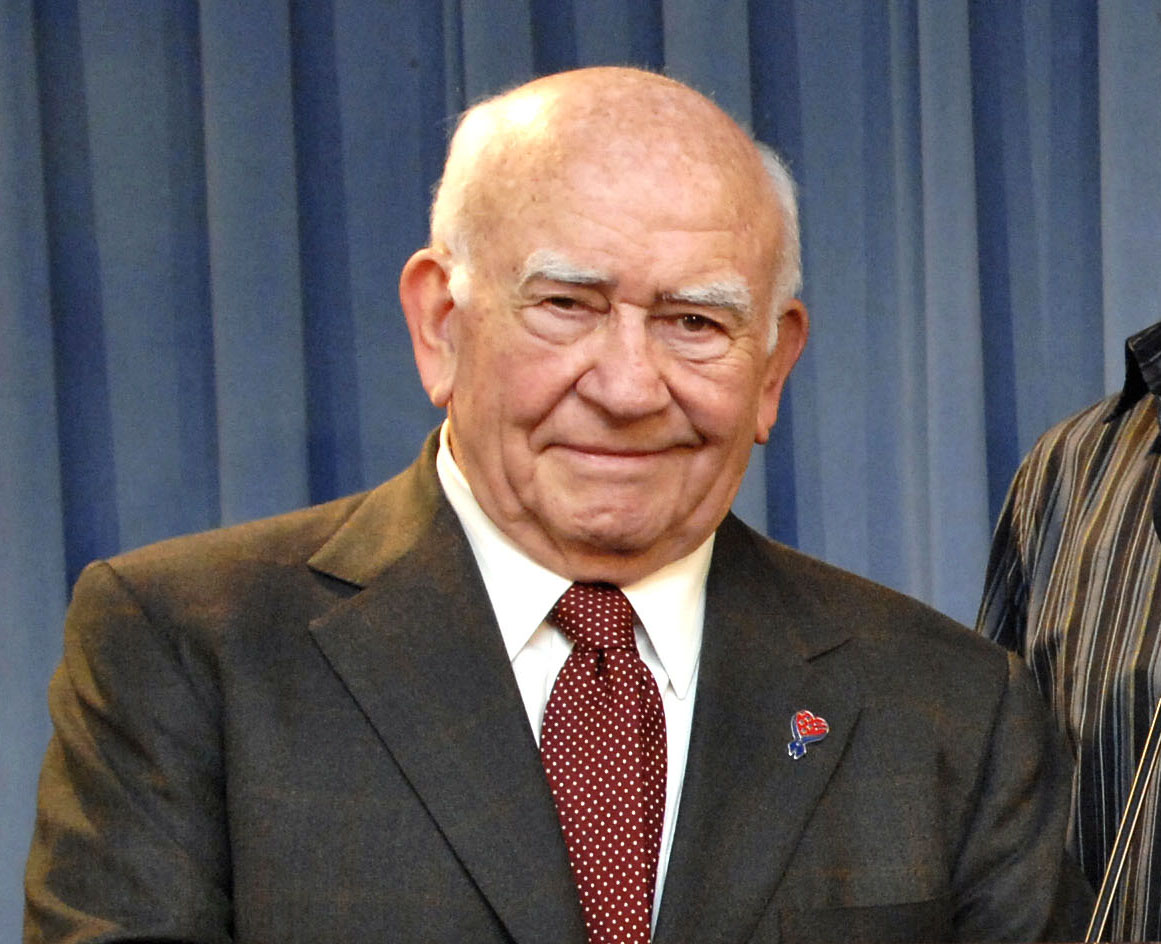
Edward Asner made a guest appearance on the show.

"Jenny Fromdabloc" was directed by series regular Bob Bowen, in his fourth episode of the season. This would be the first episode that Bowen would direct since the season six episode "A Piñata Named Desire". This episode was written by series regular Laura McCreary. This would be the second time McCreary has written an episode for the season, having also written season six episode "Stanny Boy and Frantastic". McCreary is also notable for writing for television shows such as Kim Possible and As Told By Ginger. Seth MacFarlane, the creator and executive producer of American Dad!, as well as its sister shows Family Guy and The Cleveland Show, served as the executive producer for the episode, along with series veterans Mike Barker, Rick Wiener, Matt Weitzman, Nahnatchka Khan, Michael Wittenburg, and Kenny Schwartz. Diana Retchey was the animation producer for the episode, in her thirteenth episode of the season. Amanda Bell served as the production manager, and this episode would be Bell's thirteenth episode of the season where she served as the production manager.

This episode featured two guest appearances from Edward Asner and Carl Reiner, as well as several recurring voice actors and actresses for the series. Asner previous made an appearance on the episode "There Will Be Bad Blood", serving the role as Grandpa Smith. Curtis Armstrong, Daisuke Suzuki and Eddie Kaye Thomas guest starred as Steve's friends in the episode, while Kevin Michael Richardson would return to play his part as Principal Lewis. Jeff Fischer returns to resume his role as Hayley's husband. All Armstrong, Suzuki, Thomas, Fischer, and Richardson previously reprised their roles in the season six episode "License to Till".

== Cultural references ==
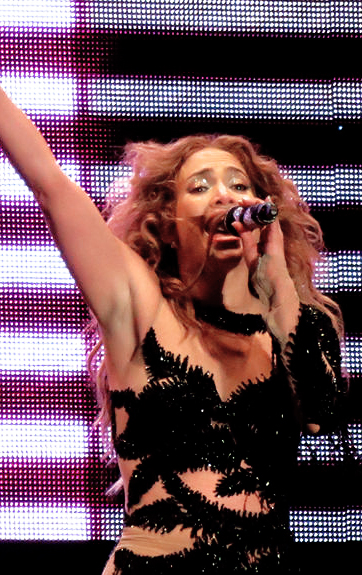
The episode title is a reference to "Jenny from the Block" by Jennifer Lopez.

This episode contains several references relating to music, media, film, and other pop culture phenomenon. The title of this episode is a reference to the Jennifer Lopez song "Jenny from the Block". The stress ball that Roger uses to fake sex with Snot is a promotional item for the Fox sitcom Sons of Tucson, which was subsequently canceled after replacing American Dad! for a month. When putting the stress ball in the washer, it is noted that Roger is whistling the theme song. Steve shows an interest in going to Baskin-Robbins and trying out all 31 flavors, a reference to the creation of the company in 1945. In a flashback Steve and his friends visit Dennis Quaid and his brother Randy Quaid.

Hayley's favorite song is revealed to be "Gangsta's Paradise" by Coolio. Stan and Francine agree to act like characters out of the 1960s television series Bewitched and I Dream of Jeannie. The scene in which Stan hallucinates and imagines Francine as a witch flying on a broom is shown in a similar fashion to the opening sequence of Bewitched. The witch then flies into a building, a reference to the September 11 attacks. Roger excitedly mentions that he wants a pair of cigarette jeans, a looked first popularized and endorsed by Forever 21. Roger, as Jenny, compares Snot to a "young Paul Reiser" whereas Steve says on his best day he is Rob Morrow. While setting up the Jenny dummy, Roger receives a text from Bob Saget. Principal Lewis attempts to sell two belts, one containing a bird that closely resembles Tweety Bird and the other containing a lyric from the Janet Jackson song "Nasty". Snot's basement is designed in a similar fashion as the basement of Eric Foreman from That '70s Show. The final scene during the ending credits of the episode is a reference to the 2010 science fiction action heist film, Inception.

== Reception ==
"Jenny Fromdabloc" was first broadcast on April 17, 2011 as part of the animation television night on Fox. The episode aired on the third spot of the line-up, a spot generally taken by Bob's Burgers. It was preceded by a rerun of The Simpsons, and succeeded by its sister show Family Guy and The Cleveland Show. It was viewed by 4.74 million viewers upon its original airing, despite airing simultaneously with America's Next Great Restaurant on NBC, Amazing Race on CBS, and Extreme Makeover: Home Edition on ABC. The total viewership of the episode was on par with that of The Cleveland Show, but significantly lower than that of Family Guy. It achieved a 2.2 rating in the 18-49 demographic, according to the Nielsen ratings. Ratings for the episode were slightly below that of The Cleveland Show, while significantly lower than that of Family Guy. The episode's total viewership and ratings were significantly up from the previous episode, "License to Till", which was viewed by 3.35 million viewers upon its initial airing, and garnered a 1.8 rating in the 18-49 demographic. The episode's ratings and total viewership were also the highest since the season six episode "I Am the Walrus", which was viewed by 4.99 million viewers and acquired a 3.0 rating in the 18-49 demographic.

"Jenny Fromdabloc" was met with critical acclaim from television critics. Rowan Kaiser of The A.V. Club gave the episode a positive review. In his review for the episode, he opined: "This was as good as I've seen American Dad." Kaiser praised the character development taken place in Roger, going on to write, "This was the Roger showcase I'd been waiting for, where he gets the chance to be shocking and witty, as well as using his character costumes to fantastic effect. Steve's friend Snot is obsessed with Hayley, who [...] isn't interested. In order to break him out of his rut, Steve convinces Roger to play a teenaged girl who's interested in Snot. Naturally, Roger goes too far, and it's fantastic." He went on to give the episode an "A" grade, the highest rating of the night, scoring higher than the Family Guy episode "Brothers & Sisters" and The Cleveland Show episode "Back to Cool".

The Parents Television Council, a television watchdog group and a regular critic of American Dad! and other Seth MacFarlane-created and produced shows, named American Dad! the "Worst TV Show of the Week" during the week of April 22, 2011 for this episode, citing sexually lewd content coming from Roger's persona, Jenny Fromdabloc. The review compared E.T. from E.T. the Extra-Terrestrial with Roger, noting, "[E.T.] taught us a few things about humanity, while the latter [Roger] specializes in profanity."
