= You Debt Your Life =

- American Dad! episode
- Episode no.: Season 7 Episode 12
- Directed by: Chris Bennett
- Written by: Erik Sommers
- Production code: 5AJN09
- Original air date: February 20, 2011

Guest appearance
- Nick Kroll as Andy Dick

Episode chronology
← Previous "A Piñata Named Desire"	Next → "I Am the Walrus"
- American Dad! season 7

"You Debt Your Life" is the twelfth episode of the seventh season of American Dad!. It aired on Fox in the United States on February 20, 2011. The episode focuses on two of the show's main characters, Roger the Alien and Stan Smith. After he saves Roger from being run over by a bus, Stan has repaid what Hayley calls his "life debt", which forces Roger to moving out of the household, and Stan replaces him with Andy Dick. Roger intuitively figures out he can get reaccepted by Stan and move back in by forcing him into a new life debt, by getting him attacked by a polar bear at a zoo and then saving his life at Area 51. Meanwhile, Steve and his friends abuse the power of being public announcers at Pearl Bailey High School.

== Plot ==
Roger is dancing drunk in a dive bar next to the pinball machines dressed as Jodie Foster from The Accused, asking if any of the clientele want to take him against his will. After punching a kindly old man and splashing a drink on a bouncer, Roger runs out into the street, into the path of a bus. Roger's life flashes before his eyes: protesting against the integration of The University of Alabama by knocking the books out of Vivian Malone's hand in front of her military escorts, getting Captain Joseph Hazelwood drunk as he steers The Exxon Valdez into an iceberg, and getting his artwork for Jar Jar Binks approved by George Lucas. Just before Roger gets hit, Stan dives in and saves him, having responded to a voicemail Roger made telling Stan he's drunk and about to be raped at the bar, and for Stan to pick him up in 45 minutes, heavily implying that he wanted to be raped.

The next day, Stan stresses about his suit being torn as a result, among Roger's other annoying mishaps. He questions why he even saved Roger's life last night, leading Hayley to bring up the matter of a "life debt". She retells the story — first described in "Roger Codger" — of how Roger saved Stan's life in Area 51 years ago. Since then, Stan owed Roger a life debt, which is why Roger lives with the Smiths, until now when Klaus says Stan has repaid the debt, leading Stan to disown Roger. Saddened, Roger moves out of the household and into an apartment, at least until Francine stops by and suggests he try to convince Stan to accept him again. Roger agrees and moves back in, only to find out Stan has replaced him with Andy Dick (who, like Roger, is described as a "fey, pansexual, alcoholic non-human"). Francine later goes to see Roger inside a men's locker room at a YMCA (as the YMCA stopped renting out rooms to the homeless 30 years ago) and suggests he remind Stan how they were once friends.

At a zoo, Stan insists on bringing Andy Dick with him, much to Roger's chagrin. Roger wishes Stan still owed him the life debt, so he pushes him into a pool with a polar bear, figuring out that, when saving him from being attacked by it, he would create a new life debt for him and therefore able to live in the house again. Andy Dick jumps into the pool to save Stan, but Roger stops Andy Dick from doing so, leading to a slapfight between the two, while the polar bear continues to attack Stan until it amputates his legs. Instead of taking Stan to a hospital, Roger drives him on a cross-country trip to Area 51 in Nevada. There, Roger finds his "fanny pack", which contains a salve that regrows Stan's legs, albeit into baby-size for the first few hours, which puts Stan in a life debt again. Security guards and a scientist appear, aware that Roger is an alien despite his disguise. Escaping from them and their explosives, Stan grabs Roger and goes through a laundry chute and onto the back of a truck, evening the debt, much to Roger's dismay. After their leave, Stan finally admits to Roger that he did not remember the life debt until Hayley brought it up and that he spent time with Andy Dick only because his character resembles Roger's. He wants Roger to return home, which Roger is delighted to do. As Roger and Stan drive away (after tricking Andy Dick to chase after a bottle of fake drugs), the two worry that Andy Dick is coming after them, only to be relieved when they see him rob a roadside pharmacy.

Meanwhile, Principal Lewis appoints Steve to a position as a public announcer at Pearl Bailey High School, after Steve tricks the previous announcer into shouting into the microphone whatever he says goes on in the school, claiming people always forget the microphone is still on. Steve himself develops such a God complex (or, as Principal Lewis calls it, "getting drunk on the mike"), prompting his concerned friends to use the same microphone trick on him. Snot takes over the announcer position and abuses its power as well. When Barry is appointed, he immediately swears directly into the microphone, leading Lewis to kick the entire group out of his office. Principal Lewis, however, gets in trouble when he forgets the microphone is on while vocally reminiscing about his shady days as a cocaine trafficker and sex offender in Peru (first mentioned in "Iced, Iced Babies").

== Production ==
This episode was written by Erik Sommers and directed by Chris Bennett, before the conclusion of Season 6. It is the second episode of the season Sommers and Bennett worked, the first being "Son of Stan".

In addition to the regular cast, comedian Nick Kroll guest starred in this episode. Recurring voice actors Curtis Armstrong, Daisuke Suzuki and Eddie Kaye Thomas guest starred as Steve's friends in the episode, while Kevin Michael Richardson would return to play his part as Principal Lewis.

== Reception ==
"You Debt Your Life" was first broadcast on February 20, 2011, as part of the animation television night on Fox. It was followed by The Simpsons, Bob's Burgers, Family Guy. and The Cleveland Show. It was viewed by 4.27 million viewers upon its original airing achieved a 2.0 rating in the 18-49 demographic, according to Nielsen ratings. Both the episode's total viewership and rating was lower than those of every other show featured in the animation television night. The episode's total viewership and ratings increased slightly from the previous episode, "A Piñata Named Desire", which was viewed by 3.9 million viewers upon its initial airing, and garnered a 1.9 rating in the 18-49 demographic.

The episode was met with mixed reviews from critics. In a simultaneous review with The Simpsons, Bob's Burgers, Family Guy, and The Cleveland Show, Rowan Kaiser of The A.V. Club gave a generally negative review to the episode. He stated its situations "were properly built for comedy, but the jokes just didn't land." Kaiser further suggested the scene when Roger devises a plan to save Stan at Area 51 was anticlimactic, saying after "some weird stuff happens, the reset button gets hit, the end." He also criticized the episode's subplot featuring Steve and his friends, saying "it's not very funny", and concerns about Hayley's cameo appearance in this episode despite her status as a main character. Kaiser concluded the entire episode was forgettable and rated it a C−, scoring higher than Family Guy episode "German Guy" but lower than The Simpsons episode "Angry Dad: The Movie", Bob's Burgers episode "Hamburger Dinner Theater", and The Cleveland Show episode "Terry Unmarried". On the other hand, Jason Hughes of TV Squad provided a positive review to the episode. Firstly, he praised on how Andy Dick managed to visually replace Roger. Hughes also enjoyed seeing Roger trying to save Stan's life just so Roger can move back in the household, as well as the salve in Roger's fanny pack giving Stan baby legs.
