= Stan's Food Restaurant =

- American Dad! episode
- Episode no.: Season 7 Episode 4
- Directed by: Josue Cervantes
- Written by: Brian Boyle
- Production code: 5AJN16
- Original air date: November 14, 2010

Guest appearances
- Hayden Panettiere as Ashley; Curtis Armstrong as Snot; Swoosie Kurtz as Betty; Roberto Perlas Gomez; Don Tai Theerathada; Alex Cuthbertson

Episode chronology
← Previous "Best Little Horror House in Langley Falls"	Next → "White Rice"
- American Dad! season 7

"Stan's Food Restaurant" is the fourth episode of the seventh season of American Dad!. It aired on Fox on November 14, 2010. The episode—which focused on Stan's dream of opening his own restaurant—is the 100th episode overall of American Dad!, an accolade currently bestowed on "100 A.D." for production order. It was written by Brian Boyle and directed by Josue Cervantes.

The episode was met with generally positive reviews from television critics, with much of the praise stemming from the humor of the episode. It was viewed by 5.38 million homes during its original airing, and it acquired a 2.6 rating from the 18–49 demographic, according to the Nielson ratings. It features the guest performances of Curtis Armstrong, Alex Cuthbertson, Roberto Perlas Gomez, Swoosie Kurtz, Hayden Panettiere, and Don Tai Theerathada.

== Plot ==
After another disastrous trip to a restaurant, Stan Smith finally reveals to his wife Francine why they can never find a restaurant that suits him: After his father left, Stan's mother took him to Johnson's Parlor in Philadelphia, where they had everything from chocolate covered hot dogs to cherry pie pizza (dishes that caused him severe diarrhea). But as they left, Johnson's exploded and Stan could never again relive the joy he had at the restaurant. Stan also recalls that he was molested by his priest, Father Roy, but on later reflection, realizes that it was he who seduced Father Roy. Francine suggests that Stan open his restaurant, and so Stan turns to Roger for help, since he has experience in doing things he has no idea about. As construction progress, Roger makes heavy changes to the layout, eventually kicking Stan out of the project, as the loan they took out from the bank is under Roger's name.

After Francine takes him to the former site of Johnson's to inspire him, Stan borrows money from Francine's parents and opens his restaurant right next door to Roger's. Despite Roger's acts of sabotage, such as placing a sign in front saying that the cooks are clumsy and have AIDS, Stan's restaurant is a success, while Roger's is a flop. Unable to admit defeat, Roger blows up Stan's restaurant which ends up burning his own in the process. Roger explains it as a way to cover up the arson by having Stan's place as the fire's source, as no one would suspect Stan of arson due to his success. Stan threatens to kill Roger, but backs down when Roger points a gun at his throat, telling him to relax.

Meanwhile, Steve, Stan's son, meets a new girl named Ashley, who was kicked out of her last school for "having too much sex." She invites Steve over while her parents are out of town, asking him to bring a friend for her friend Julia. When he arrives with Snot Lonstein, they discover that Julia is a doll. Snot is frustrated that he has no date, but stays for Steve's sake. Snot carelessly tosses Julia on a bed before using the bathroom, leading Ashley to assume that Snot "raped" Julia. After an unpleasant experience in which Julia "admits" she instigated it and "gets an abortion", Steve and Snot attempt to make it seem as though Julia killed herself and requested Ashley have sex with Steve in her note. But when Ashley realizes she was "murdered" and wants to find out her killer, Steve gives up, leaves in frustration, and dismisses Ashley as a weirdo.

== Production ==
"Stan's Food Restaurant" was directed by Josue Cervantes and written by Brian Boyle. This would be the first episode of the seventh season that would be written by Boyle. As of this episode, each of Seth MacFarlane's main characters have owned a restaurant of some sort. Peter Griffin owned Big Pete's House of Munch, Cleveland Brown owned a deli while still living in Quahog, and Stan Smith owned Stan's Food Restaurant.

In addition to the regular cast, actress Hayden Panettiere, actress Swoosie Kurtz, actor Roberto Perlas Gomez, and actor Don Tai Theerathada guest starred in this episode. Recurring voice actor Curtis Armstrong reprises his role as Steve's friend, Snot, having last done so in "Best Little Horror House in Langley Falls". Writer Alex Cuthbertson also made a minor appearance as well.

== Reception ==
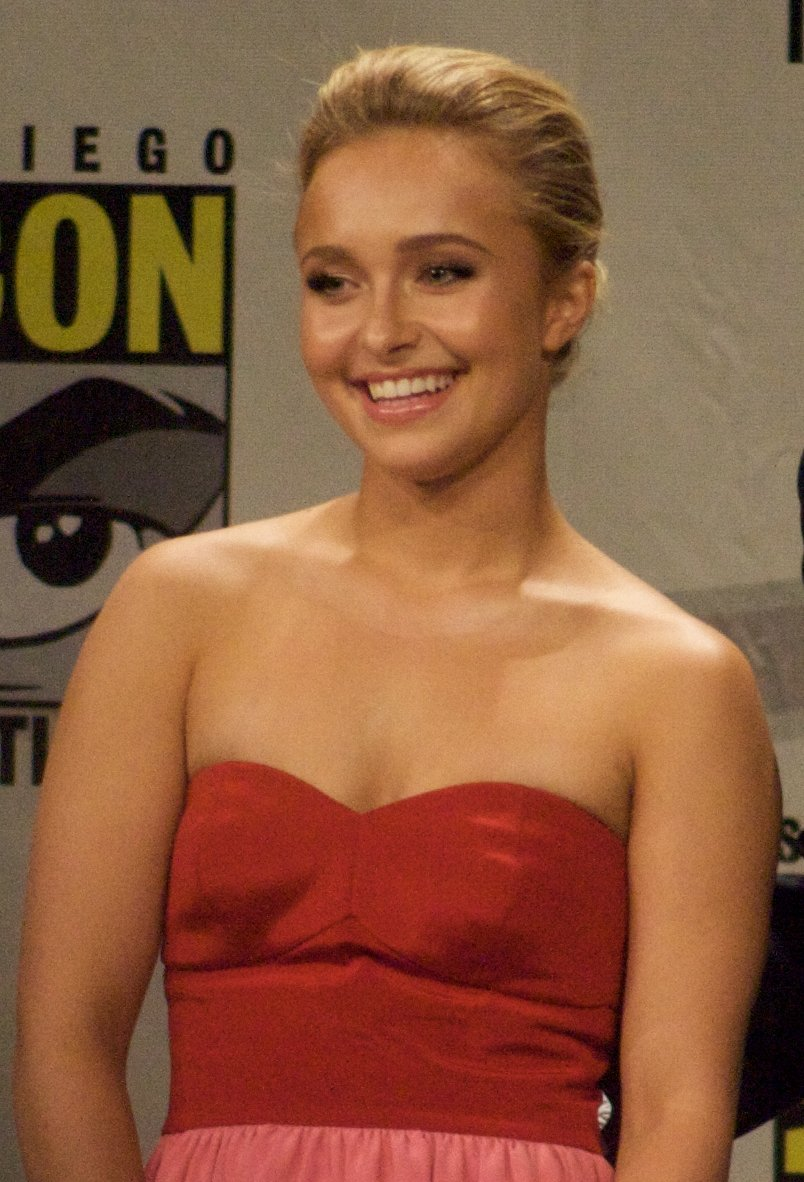
Hayden Panettiere made a guest appearance on the show.

"Stan's Food Restaurant" was broadcast on November 14, 2010, as part of the animated television block on Fox. It was preceded by The Simpsons, and its sister shows The Cleveland Show and Family Guy. The episode was viewed by 5.38 million homes during its initial airing, despite airing simultaneously with Desperate Housewives on ABC, Undercover Boss on CBS, and Sunday Night Football on NBC. It garnered a 2.6 rating from the 18-49 demographic, the lowest rating out of its timeslot. The episode's total viewership and ratings were significantly down from the previous episode, "Best Little Horror House in Langley Falls", which was viewed by 6.3 million viewers during its initial airing, and received a 3.8 rating in the 18-49 demographic.

Emily VanDerWerff of The A.V. Club wrote a review with mixed reactions, concluding "I think where the episode ultimately didn't work as well for me was when the dueling restaurants plotline came along, simply because that split up Roger and Stan into two separate stories in an episode that didn't have room for that sort of thing. I get why it happened, and I liked Stan realizing his dream [...], but it felt like there was more to mine here than actually got mined, and that made the episode a funny one that didn't quite have a strong story to hold it together. She went on to give the episode a B−, the third highest grade of the night, beating out The Cleveland Show episode "Little Man on Campus", but scoring lower than The Simpsons episode "Lisa Simpson, This Isn't Your Life" and Family Guy episode "Baby, You Knock Me Out". Jason Hughes of TV Squad gave a positive review for the episode, writing, "It was fun seeing Stan's restaurant actually succeed, once he got out from under the yoke of Roger taking over the first dream. Maybe pancake plates and chocolate chip meatballs are things MacFarlane has actually considered."
