= How Do You Solve a Problem Like Roberta? =

- The Cleveland Show episode
- Episode no.: Season 2 Episode 11
- Directed by: Anthony Agrusa
- Written by: Aaron Lee
- Production code: 2APS12
- Original air date: January 16, 2011

Guest appearances
- Wilmer Valderrama as Diego; Lea Michele as Rachel Berry; Cory Monteith as Finn Hudson; Matthew Morrison as Will Schuester; Jane Lynch as Sue Sylvester; Chris Colfer as Kurt Hummel

Episode chronology
← Previous "Ain't Nothin' But Mutton Bustin"	Next → "Like a Boss"
- The Cleveland Show season 2

"How Do You Solve a Problem Like Roberta?" is the eleventh episode of the second season of the American animated television sitcom The Cleveland Show, and the 32nd episode overall. Written by Aaron Lee and directed by Anthony Agrusa, it originally aired on Fox in the United States on January 16, 2011. The episode had guest appearances by Wilmer Valderrama and cast members of the show Glee.

In this episode, after Cleveland criticizes her parenting skills, Donna lets him deal with Roberta by himself. This episode came in third with 5.5 million viewers, beating American Dad! and Bob's Burgers.

== Plot ==
At a school carnival, Cleveland wins two tickets for a weekend at a spa and Rallo wishes himself to be invisible which he believes in as he pulls pranks in the nude. When Roberta and Donna grow apart, Donna reaches her wits end. After Cleveland criticizes her parenting skills, Donna lets him deal with Roberta by himself and takes off with Kendra for the spa weekend Cleveland had won. Cleveland tries to get on Roberta's good side by letting her spend time with Federline only to find out they broke up and Roberta is dating an older boy named Diego. When Cleveland forbids her from going out with Diego, he tries to make up for it by hosting a party at their house instead.

When Cleveland's party is a bust, he heads off to bed leaving Roberta to invite a house full of rowdy partiers (who play music so loud, it makes everything in Cleveland's room jump, and makes Cleveland fall off the bed, jolting him awake to find the partiers) while she uses the cover to sneak off with Diego. Finding Federline crying in the bushes from their breakup, they find the only car they can use to pursue Roberta & Diego is Raymond's old driver's education car, which has a stoned Raymond in the backseat. Meanwhile, Diego's driving scares Roberta who wants out but Diego refuses until after the race which Roberta finds herself in. Directed by Raymond, Cleveland manages to intercept Diego and ejects Raymond who wrecks Diego's car (Raymond then says "I'd like to solve the puzzle, Pat" and passes out, not from the car crash, as he was uninjured, but from having smoked a large amount of marijuana shortly before). Recovering Roberta from the wreck, Cleveland gives credit for driving to Federline letting Roberta make out with him. Rushing home, they clean up the mess from the party before Donna comes home. When Roberta shows a changed attitude towards Donna, Donna starts to doubt her parenting skills for real, until Cleveland tells her of the events of the weekend. Cleveland says the raising teenage girls is hard and they should concentrate on Cleveland Jr. who chooses that moment to walk past naked believing himself to be invisible thanks to Rallo. Cleveland ends the episode by asking why Cleveland Jr. has a C-section scar.

The cast of Glee from left to right: Rachel Berry, Finn Hudson, Kurt Hummel, Artie Abrams, Mr. Schuester, Mercedes Jones, Noah Puckerman, Quinn Fabray, Tina Cohen-Chang

== Production ==
The episode had guest appearances by Jane Lynch, Matthew Morrison, Cory Monteith, Chris Colfer and Lea Michele reprising their roles from the show Glee.

== Reception ==
Rowan Kaiser of The A.V. Club graded the episode a C, stating "With The Cleveland Show, having not one but two amusing running gags counts as a victory. Not much of a victory, but it's enough to not give it the lowest grade of the night".

Jason Hughes of TV Squad commented on this episode, saying, "Probably the strongest of the shows tonight, Cleveland explored the differing parenting styles of Cleveland and Donna, and featured several sight gags throughout the more serious parental issues to keep things light and moving. The best of these was Rallo running around naked through the episode, believing he was invisible. Yes, this has been done a million times, and I know I took issue with a lack of cleverness in earlier episodes, but it was more the fact that everyone ignored him as he did things like "ghost cookies" and "ghost fart," because they simply didn't care. Plus, it was capped off by Junior taking over the mantle once Cleveland broke the truth to Rallo." Also saying, "Despite its slower start, this episode had its fair share of good laughs and quickly wrapped everything up into a pleasant ending."

Family Guy dropped from last week’s 4.7 rating to 3.7 but still managing to hold its own with 7 million viewers, taking out first place followed by The Simpsons with 6.4 million (3.1, down from last week’s impressive 5.7 rating). Next in line was The Cleveland Show, drawing in 5.5 million viewers (a 2.7 rating). Closely behind was Bob’s Burgers, which generated an audience of 5.1 million (a 2.6 rating), a distinct difference from last week’s pilot episode.
