= Flirting with Disaster (American Dad!) =

- American Dad! episode
- Episode no.: Season 6 Episode 18
- Directed by: Pam Cooke
- Written by: Keith Heisler
- Production code: 6AJN06
- Original air date: May 15, 2011

Episode chronology
← Previous "Home Wrecker"	Next → "Gorillas in the Mist"
- American Dad! season 7

"Flirting with Disaster" is the eighteenth episode of the seventh season and the 114th overall episode of the animated comedy series American Dad!. It aired on Fox in the United States on May 15, 2011, and is written by Keith Heisler and directed by Pam Cooke.

In the episode, Francine begins working at the CIA office with Stan, which makes Stan uncomfortable. Meanwhile, Steve and Roger build birdhouses for cash.

== Plot ==
During the apparent filming of a Dutch documentary, Deputy Director Bullock is forced to promote an office worker, Lorraine, and hires Francine as a replacement. Francine soon finds out that the entire office flirts with each other and soon gets into the spirit of things. Stan is less enthused as he is very popular with the office ladies due to his muscular buttocks and is forced to restrain himself in front of Francine. When Francine finds out she tells him he can relax and continue his flirtations but when Stan sees the others in the office flirting back with Francine he starts to have reservations. When Lorraine finds that the guys are no longer interested in her, she becomes angry. Eating lunch with a depressed Stan, they both commiserate over how they need to get Francine out of the office. But as Bullock finds his partially eaten sandwich in Francine's desk that had been planted by Stan, Lorraine throws acid in Francine's face, disfiguring her horribly.

After being told that it could take years for a skin donation to become available, Stan confesses to Francine that he only intended her to be fired and Francine kicks him out of her hospital room. Francine returns to work to everyone's horror. Desperate to find someone to pay attention to Francine, Stan threatens to shoot Dick in the crotch but he ended up taking the bullet rather than face Francine. Stan then turns to Butch Johnson, who confesses to being a Chinese spy rather than face Francine, although Stan fails to notice that the Dutch film crew are also Chinese spies. Butch suggests he should pay more attention to Francine himself. Stan agrees and feels much better, but still kills Butch for being a spy. When he goes home, Francine is initially resistant to his flirting as it feels like it shouldn't count because they're married, but she soon warms up to the idea. As they embrace and Francine calls him by his office nickname "Thunderbutt", Stan hits on the idea of having some of his skin and muscles removed from his buttocks to be transplanted into Francine's face, restoring her looks.

Meanwhile, Roger sees Steve building a birdhouse and talks him into starting a birdhouse-building business. Steve asks Roger to buy more supplies when the orders start rolling in. But when Roger buys cheap supplies to pocket the cash difference for drugs and girls, resulting in the death of a family of birds, Steve breaks up their partnership. Roger later arrives and claims to have cleaned up his act. As they bid each other farewell, Steve gives a voice-over monologue, saying that he knows Roger is faking it. Within minutes, he suffers a drug overdose, the camera pulling back to show Roger convulsing on the kitchen floor.

== Reception ==
The episode received mixed reviews. Rowan Kaiser of The A.V. Club gave the episode a C+, saying "This episode is remarkably resistant to criticism. In some respects, its reliance on horrific violence and awkward humor make it seem more like Family Guy than American Dad at its best. A conversation between Steve and an apparently-clean Roger that seems like a reference to a movie just outside of my memory exemplifies this – it's awkward, but it's a reference, so it's okay? I'm not sure about this episode of American Dad, but I know what I hate, and I didn't hate that." Dyanamaria Leifsson of TV Equals gave the episode a positive review, saying "I did love Stan’s thunder-butt thunderclap and I thought the ending was pretty cute with Francine calling Stan "Crater Butt" and Stan calling her "Ass Face" – thank goodness they’ve got such a great plastic surgeon in town. Although American Dad normally has a twisted sense of humor, this episode was much darker than I normally expect. If you’re the kind of American Dad fan that loves when the humor gets really depraved, this episode is bound to be among your favorites. I just hope I’ll be able to forget Francine’s scabby melted face or it will be hard for me to look at her the same way ever again."

The episode was watched by a total of 3.89 million people, this made it the fifth most watched show on Animation Domination that night, losing to Bob's Burgers, The Cleveland Show, The Simpsons and Family Guy with 6.55 million.
