= Home Wrecker =

- American Dad! episode
- Episode no.: Season 7 Episode 17
- Directed by: Joe Daniello
- Written by: Alan Freedland; Alan R. Cohen
- Production code: 6AJN05
- Original air date: May 8, 2011

Guest appearance
- Maurice LaMarche as Uzi Knessett

Episode chronology
← Previous "Jenny Fromdabloc"	Next → "Flirting with Disaster"

"Home Wrecker" is the seventeenth episode of the seventh season American Dad!. It aired on Fox in the United States on May 8, 2011. This episode mainly centers around the couple of Stan and Francine, whom become divided over the architectural style wanted for the renovation of their kitchen. Greg and Terry, the Smiths' gay neighbors, intervene in the situation. Greg and Terry criticize the strength of Stan and Francine's marriage, much to their frustration. A bet is made in regard to the Smiths' rocky relationship: if Terry and Greg were to win the bet, they would receive the marriage license of Stan and Francine. Meanwhile, Steve, his friends, and Principal Lewis take advantage of Barry's proficient ability to count cards; however things become awry when they try to remove Lewis of his cut.

This episode was written by Alan Freedland and Alan R. Cohen, and directed by Joe Daniello. It was met with mixed reception from television critics, who criticized the episode's humor. During its initial airing, the episode was viewed by 3.29 million households and achieved a 1.6 rating in the 18-49 demographic, according to the Nielsen ratings. It featured a guest appearance from Maurice LaMarche, as well as several recurring voice actors and actresses for the series.

== Plot ==
After Hayley is hit in the forehead with a plate from the cabinet, she and Jeff start arguing over their new checks. Stan admonishes Jeff and Hayley about their bickering and points out his and Francine's romantic harmony in a Grease-style musical number. Hearing from Roger that Greg and Terry just remodeled their kitchen, Hayley, Jeff, Stan and Francine head over to take a look. After admiring the new kitchen, they consider remodeling their own, but Greg and Terry tell them their marriage cannot handle the strain. Stan takes up the challenge; if they can remodel without breaking up, Greg and Terry will pay for the remodel (a deal made without Greg's consent). If they fail, Greg and Terry get the Smiths' marriage license, planning to cross out their names and write their own.

Stan and Francine have a minor disagreement when they both choose white for the new color but pick different shades, but things start to fall apart when Francine wants a modern kitchen and Stan wants a traditional one. With Greg and Terry present, Stan overrides Francine with the contractor, insisting on his kitchen choice. Francine retaliates by asking the contractor to put a bay window in the kitchen. When Stan finds out, they start to bicker but when they notice Greg and Terry watching pretend that everything is still fine.

As the remodel spreads through the house, Stan and Francine's marital harmony breaks down until they finally divide the house in two (an idea Stan bases off an episode of The Brady Bunch), each decorating in their chosen style. Not satisfied, they each attempt to drive the other out of the house until they erect a block wall between the two halves of the house, inside and out. As the rest of the family spends one holiday after another with first Francine, then Stan (celebrating several holidays in a single week in their attempts to make each other feel bad), they leave the other alone and miserable. They run into each other at the grocery store, and Francine reminds Stan which toilet paper to get. After several days of being alone, they hear each other across the wall and cannot bear to be apart any longer. They tear down the wall and agree to return the house to how it used to be, but removing the wall causes the rest of the house to collapse.

Meanwhile, at Pearl Bailey High School, when Principal Lewis knocks a box of candy out of Barry's hands, Barry quickly determines what was lost. Deciding to test Barry, Principal Lewis runs through a deck of cards, and Barry is successful in determining the remaining cards. Principal Lewis takes Barry, Steve, Snot, and Toshi out to a gambling house where he turns Barry loose at the blackjack table and quickly wins big. However, when Principal Lewis leaves them stuck in the car while he goes to a strip club with the winnings. The boys decide to strike out on their own and are successful until Principal Lewis finds them and threatens to sell them out. They expose Principal Lewis, who owes the casino $22,014 (the $14 is due to an overpriced reuben). Lewis reveals that the kids were counting cards, and the casino owner orders that they all be shot. Fleeing the casino's goons, they hide behind a trash can until the goons empty their weapons. Barry betrays Principal Lewis by claiming the goons are out of ammunition when one of them has a single bullet left. Principal Lewis bursts out in confidence but is shot in the shoulder as the goons leave satisfied. Barry then jams his finger into Principal Lewis' bullet wound as part of his revenge for knocking his candy out of his hands.

== Production and development ==
"Home Wrecker" was originally intended to air as the eighteenth episode of the sixth season of American Dad!, airing a week after the third part of a fictional crossover event between American Dad!, The Cleveland Show, and Family Guy. However just two days before its planned airing, it was announced by the executive of the entertainment division of the Fox Broadcasting Company that the event was pushed back until next season, due to a series of tornadoes that killed nearly 300 people in the Southern United States.

In addition to the regular cast, voice actor Maurice LaMarche guest starred in the episode. Recurring voice actors Curtis Armstrong, Daisuke Suzuki and Eddie Kaye Thomas guest starred as Steve's friends in the episode, while Kevin Michael Richardson would return to play his part as Principal Lewis. Jeff Fischer returns to resume his role as Hayley's husband while writer Mike Barker would return to play his part as Terry Bates. In addition to his roles of Stan and Roger, series creator Seth MacFarlane reprised his role of Greg Corbin. Armstrong, Suzuki, Thomas, Fischer, and Richardson previously reprised their roles in the season six episode "Jenny Fromdabloc", while Barker previously reprised his role in the season six episode "The People vs. Martin Sugar".

== Cultural references ==
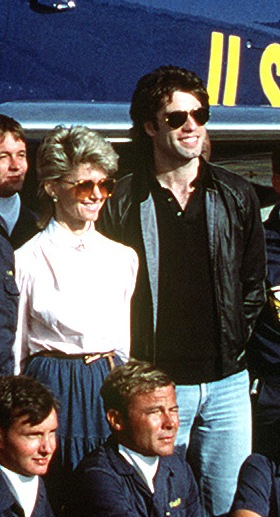
The 1978 musical film Grease, which starred Olivia Newton-John (left) and John Travolta (right), was parodied in the episode

"Home Wrecker" contains several references relating to music, media, film, and other pop culture phenomenon. The musical number that was performed by the Smith family is a parody to the performance of the song "We Go Together" in the 1978 musical film, Grease. Francine and Stan closely resembled Sandy Olsson and Danny Zuko, whom were played by Olivia Newton-John and John Travolta, respectively. The episode's subplot is a parodical combination of the 1988 comedy film Rain Man and the 2008 drama film 21. The British film director and producer Alfred Hitchcock was referenced in the episode, in which he can be seen at the strip club where Principal Lewis goes to as a silhouette.

This episode satirizes several stereotypes in regard to the homosexual community, particularly among gay men. Among these stereotypes include, their love for musicals, their love for redecorating and their love for the finer things in life (Terry's reference to olives at Mediterranean temperature). The scene in which Stan and Francine divides the house to fit their needs is similar to the style of that seen in the television sitcom The Brady Bunch.

Several songs were satirized and parodied in the episode. Toshi sings in English when singing with Steve, Snot, and Barry "Yah Mo B There". The music that binds Fran and Stan sounds like Barry Mann's "Who Put the Bomp (in the Bomp, Bomp, Bomp)".

== Reception ==
"I expect weird from any given MacFarlane show, and American Dad does have a reputation for surreality as the icing on the cake. Still, beginning the episode with an odd kind of anti-humor, escalating directly into a musical number, which itself escalates into a bizarre revival/tent preacher [...] segment? Joke? Scene? It's not quite Family Guy anti-humor, although it's similar, especially thanks to the old-fashioned musical conceit."

—Rowan Kaiser of The A.V. Club, on "Home Wrecker"

"Home Wrecker" first aired on May 8, 2011 in the United States as part of the animated television night on Fox. Like with much of the latter half of the season, the episode was first in the animation television line-up. It was succeeded by episodes of The Simpsons, Bob's Burgers, and its sister shows Family Guy and The Cleveland Show. It was viewed by over 3.29 million viewers, despite airing simultaneously with 60 Minutes on CBS, Dateline on NBC, and America's Funniest Home Videos on ABC. The total viewership of "Home Wrecker" was the lowest of the season, and it also became the lowest rated episode in the series' history. It garnered a 1.6 rating in the 18-49 demographic, according to the Nielsen ratings. The total viewership and ratings for the episode were significantly down from the previous episode, "Jenny Fromdabloc", which was viewed by 4.74 million viewers and received a 2.2 rating in the 18-49 demographic.

Television critics were polarized with the episode. Rowan Kaiser of The A.V. Club was impartial on the episode, ultimately giving it a 'C+' grade. This would be the second lowest grade of the night: "Home Wrecker" went on to score higher than The Simpsons episode "Homer Scissorhands" but score lower than Family Guy episode "The Big Bang Theory", the Bob's Burgers episode "Weekend at Mort's", and The Cleveland Show episode "Your Show of Shows". Kaiser called it "a [fucking] weird episode of American Dad". He expressed discontentment for the episode's humor, saying that there was an excessive tendency to use meta-jokes. Kaiser also felt that the episode was over-saturated with humor. More criticism stemmed into the show's use of Roger in the episode, as he wrote: "Roger is sadly generally lacking [...] as is the manic pacing of most American Dad episodes. I like that they try weird random [shit], but I don't think it really succeeded here." In his review for "Home Wrecker", Rowan Kaiser concluded that the episode "wasn't a total waste". He continued: "There are some good bits, most notable a montage as Francine and Stan celebrate various holidays apart from one another over the course of a week."
