= Elmarie Wendel =

American actress and singer (1928–2018)

- Born: November 23, 1928; Howard County, Iowa, U.S.
- Died: July 21, 2018 (aged 89)
- Occupations: Actress, singer
- Years active: 1956–2018
- Children: 1

Elmarie Louise Wendel (November 23, 1928 – July 21, 2018) was an American actress and singer best known as Mamie Dubcek on the NBC sitcom 3rd Rock from the Sun.

== Early life ==
Born on a farm in Howard County, Iowa, one of five siblings, Wendel spent her childhood travelling with her musical parents and dancing with her sisters in and around the Midwest in club and concert hall venues, including the Grand Ole Opry. She eventually made her way to New York City where she appeared in, among other productions, the original 1959 off-Broadway production of Little Mary Sunshine, starring Eileen Brennan and John McMartin. Wendel is of German descent.

== Career ==
A national touring company of Annie took her to Los Angeles, where she made a successful transition into film and television. She garnered the role of the eccentric Mrs. Dubcek on 3rd Rock from the Sun. From 1996 to 2001, she appeared in about 70 episodes of the show. She made appearances on such shows as Seinfeld, Love & War, Murphy Brown, Murder, She Wrote, and Empty Nest. She appeared in And the Band Played On and Far from Home. She had a recurring role as Gina, a lascivious assembly line co-worker of the title character on George Lopez. In 2008, she appeared on General Hospital in the recurring role of Peg. Her musical theatre credits include Wonderful Town, Cole Porter Revisited, Little Mary Sunshine and Gigi.

== Personal life and death ==
Wendel's daughter, J.C. Wendel, is also an actress. Her death was announced on her daughter's Instagram on July 21, 2018. No cause or place of death was given but Wendel had resided in Studio City, California, at the time of her death.

== Filmography ==
=== Film ===
Year	Title	Role	Notes	Ref.
1961	A Bowl of Cherries	Daphne	Short comedy film written and directed by William Kronick	
1990	The Immortalizer	Agnes	Horror Science fiction film directed by Joel Bender; Direct-to-Video	
1991	Going Under	Sonar	Comedy film directed by Mark W. Travis	
1995	Rumpelstiltskin	Gypsy Woman	Comedy fantasy horror film directed by Mark Jones	
2000	Attraction	Beehive Waitress	Drama romantic thriller film directed by Russell DeGrazier	
2011	A Bag of Hammers	The Mark	Comedy drama film directed by Brian Crano and written by Crano and Jake Sandvig	
2012	The Lorax	Aunt Grizelda	Voice, animated film; Also known as Dr. Seuss' The Lorax	

=== Television ===
Year	Title	Role	Notes	Ref.
1982	Crisis Counselor	Guest	Episode: "Aging Woman"	
1982	Knight Rider	Woman	Episode: "No Big Thing"	
1985	The Jeffersons	Mrs. Pardella	Episode: "State of Mind"	
1987	The Facts of Life	Jackie	Episode: "Sweet Charity"	
1990	Sugar and Spice	Bag Lady	Episode: "Breaking in Is Hard to Do"	
1990	She Said No	Guest	Television film directed by John Patterson concerning acquaintance rape	
1991	Babes	Sister Katherine	Episode: "All Bummed Out"	
1991	Murphy Brown	Mrs. Beale	Episode: "Everytime It Rains... You Get Wet"	
1991	Major Dad	Mona	Episode: "On the Line"	
1992	Empty Nest	Vivian	Episode: "Charley for President"	
1992	Seinfeld	Helene	Episode: "The Trip"	
1992	Santa Barbara	Landlady	Episode: "Ep 2,053"	
1993	Murder, She Wrote	Nurse Receptionist	Episode: "The Petrified Florist"	
1993	Love & War	Maude	Episode: "They Can't Take That Away from Me"	
1993	The Pink Panther	Guest	Episode: "Pilgrim Panther/That Old Pink Magic"	
1994	Empty Nest	Agnes	Episode: "The Ballad of Shady Pines"	
1994	Weird Science	Mrs. Wilder	Episode: "She's Alive" (Pilot)	
1996–2001	3rd Rock from the Sun	Mrs. Dubcek	Recurring role: Seasons 1–2 (1996–97); Contract role: Seasons 3–6 (1997–2001)	
1998	Jenny	Doris	Episode: "A Girl's Gotta Merger"	
2000	The Angry Beavers	Doris Rabbit	Voice, episode: "Driving Misses Daggett/Big"	
2001–2002	NYPD Blue	Susan Hornby	Recurring role, 4 episodes	
2003–2007	George Lopez	Gina Sorenstam	Recurring role, 12 episodes	
2008	General Hospital	Peg	Recurring role; Uncredited	
2011	American Dad!	Beverley Billingsley	Voice, episode: "Stanny Boy and Frantastic"	
2011	Criminal Minds: Suspect Behavior	Paula	Episode: "Devotion"	
2014	The Exes	Ruthie	Episode: "The Old Man and the Holly"	

=== Video games ===
Year	Title	Role	Notes	Ref.
2015	Fallout 4	Mandy Stiles / Cathy / Pulowski Preservation Shelter		
2018	Fallout 76	Pulowski Preservation Shelter	Posthumous release	
