= White Rice (American Dad!) =

- American Dad! episode
- Episode no.: Season 7 Episode 5
- Directed by: Bob Bowen
- Written by: Rick Wiener; Kenny Schwartz
- Production code: 5AJN15
- Original air date: November 21, 2010

Guest appearance
- Jason Alexander as Sal

Episode chronology
← Previous "Stan's Food Restaurant"	Next → "There Will Be Bad Blood"
- American Dad! season 7

"White Rice" is the fifth episode of the seventh season of American Dad!. It first aired in the United States on Fox on November 21, 2010. This episode mostly centers around Francine, who has consistently been involved in various arguments with Stan about her bringing her parents into their home. Stan convinces Francine to go see a therapist to help smoothen their relationship, which turns out to be a hypnotist. The hypnotist, named Sal, eventually tells her to let go of the repressed memories she had from Stan. Later that day, Francine discovers a secret stash, which contain videos of her doing stand-up comedy when she was younger. Francine is enraged that Stan erased her memories of being a comedian. She later lands a role in a sitcom entitled "White Rice", and she vows to pursue her dream of being famous and rich.

This episode was written by Rick Wiener and Kenny Schwartz, and was directed by Bob Bowen. It was met with mostly positive reception from most television critics upon its airing, with much of the praise stemming from the main storyline, as well as the humor. This episode was viewed by 4.83 million homes during its initial airing, and acquired a 2.3 rating in the 18-49 demographic, according to the Nielson ratings. This episode feature a guest appearance from Jason Alexander, as well as several recurring voice actors and actresses for the show.

== Plot ==
Greg and Terry see Stan and Francine outside arguing as Francine wants to consider moving her aging parents to town, and Stan does not wish to discuss it. Stan tells her he will go to a therapist with her, making her happy. However, it turns out the therapist is a hypnotist named Sal, who Stan brings Francine to every year to be hypnotized into doing stuff he prefers while he gets a sandwich, always walking out before Sal can finish asking Stan to get one for him. Sal tells Francine she will not remember the sessions, and she represses her memories.

1 year later, Francine has the same argument with Stan again, and they go to see Sal again. Stan goes to get a sandwich again before Sal can finish asking Stan to get him one, making Sal angry. When Stan comes back in the room 20 minutes later, Sal tells Francine she will remember everything Stan made him repress. Stan is horrified, and asks Sal why he did that; Sal replies that Stan's been coming to him for 20 years, and never once offered to bring him a sandwich whenever Stan went out for one. Stan tries hypnotizing Francine the same way Sal did, but she knees him in the balls while he yells "Emilio!".

Francine scolds Stan as she remembers everything from Stan not vaccinating Hayley's twin brother, Bayley, (resulting in his death) to Stan sleep-punching her. When they return home, more repressed memories come back, and Francine remembers that she had a secret hole in the floor in Stan's plate room, which used to be Francine's home office. Francine discovers a videotape in the hole and puts it in Roger's VCR to find out she was once a comedian who made fun of Asians, mainly referring to her being adopted by Chinese parents. Francine decides to pursue her dream as a comedian, with Roger as a persona named Sweeps McCullough being her agent. Francine is mad that Stan does not watch her comedy routine, and convinces Stan to go. Roger gets some executives to watch her show. Francine throws up at the beginning. Stan, confident that her life as a comedian is over, leaves. Francine and Roger return with good news: Francine has been picked up for a new sitcom on Fox. Francine's dream takes her to Hollywood, where her show is recorded.

Stan, sad that Francine is gone, sulks on the couch. Klaus convinces him that he must accept the changes to get Francine back. Stan rushes onto the set, with everything that Francine has wanted to discuss in the last 20 years. Stan comes onto the set of Francine's new show and talks with Francine, showing that Stan has gotten 20 dogs, one for each year she wanted to talk about it, painted the kitchen purple, etc. It turns out Francine only wanted to discuss those matters before deciding to do them. Stan and Francine make up, accepting that they can live their lives in Los Angeles. The crew then watched the premiere of the show White Rice. But despite its comedic success, the show ends up being canceled after a single joke because Asians found her jokes to be too racist. Francine and Stan move back to Langley Falls with Roger killing off his persona. Back at home, Francine finally discusses her parents moving in, and they both agree that it is a terrible idea.

Meanwhile, Steve gets another fish, which Klaus starts falling in love with. Throughout the episode, they marry and have children who resemble each other. Unfortunately, this does not turn out well, because Klaus' "wife" is a dumb, mindless fish that starts eating their children, not just out of hunger, even leaving one half-eaten. Eventually Klaus is ignored and the relationship falls apart, culminating in Klaus killing her and using Stan's shovel to bury the body.

== Reception ==
"White Rice" was broadcast on November 21, 2010, as part of the animated television block on Fox. It was preceded by The Simpsons, and its sister shows The Cleveland Show and Family Guy. It was viewed by 4.83 million homes during its original airing, according to the Nielson ratings, despite simultaneously airing alongside Undercover Boss on CBS, the 2010 American Music Awards on ABC, and Sunday Night Football on NBC. It received a 2.3 rating in the 18-49 demographic, the lowest rating in the block, scoring slightly lower than The Cleveland Show and The Simpsons and significantly lower than Family Guy. This episode's total viewership were significantly down from the previous episode that first aired a week earlier, although the rating slightly declined. The previous episode, "Stan's Food Restaurant", was viewed by 5.38 million homes during its initial airing, and acquired a 2.6 rating in the 18-49 demographic.

Emily VanDerWerff of The A.V. Club gave the episode a very positive review, writing, "This was one of my favorite American Dad shows in a long time. It's hard to write good stand-up that's supposed to be funny, and for a while, I thought this would be a fatal flaw of the episode, but, no, we're supposed to think Francine's stand-up is pretty bad. That's why Roger's able to so easily sell her to Hollywood." She went on to give the episode an A−, the highest grade of the night, beating out The Simpsons episode "The Fool Monty", The Cleveland Show episode "Fat and Wet", and Family Guy episode "Brian Writes a Bestseller". Jason Hughes of TV Squad wrote a review with mixed reactions, finding the episode to have not gone deep enough into the subject of racial stereotypes on television.
