= American Dad! season 7 =

American Dad!
- Season 7
- Official Volume 7 Cover, which includes the full seventh season.
- Starring: Seth MacFarlane; Wendy Schaal; Scott Grimes; Rachael MacFarlane; Dee Bradley Baker
- No. of episodes: 19

Release
- Original network: Fox
- Original release: October 3, 2010 – May 22, 2011

Season chronology
- ← Previous; Season 6 Next → Season 8

The seventh season of American Dad! originally aired on the Fox Network in nineteen episodes from October 3, 2010, to May 22, 2011, before being released as on a DVD box set and in syndication. Guest stars of this season include Jason Alexander, Sarah Chalke, Hector Elizondo, Anthony Michael Hall, Hayden Panettiere, Lou Diamond Phillips and Burt Reynolds.

== Episodes ==
No. overall	No. in season	Title	Directed by	Written by	Original release date	Prod. code	U.S. viewers (millions)
97	1	"100 A.D."	Tim Parsons	Keith Heisler	October 3, 2010	5AJN14	6.16
Jeff continues to try to get Hayley back until Stan and Francine confront him and tell him to leave her alone. Taking Reginald's advice to give Hayley some space, Jeff decides to confront Hayley once and for all. It is later revealed that Jeff and Hayley ran away and Stan and Francine offer the public a reward of $50,000 to stop the wedding. This causes mass hysteria with 97 people killed off in a freak bus accident. Later on, they are eventually found, and Stan and Francine are tricked by Jeff into giving him the $50,000, thus letting Stan allow them to get married. Meanwhile, in response of Jeff and Hayley's marriage announcement, Roger and Steve dress up as Wheels and the Legman (from the episode Haylias) and try to stop the wedding and get the reward themselves, until Roger is under the influence of Turkish amphetamines, landing them in Shanghai.
98	2	"Son of Stan"	Chris Bennett	Erik Sommers	October 10, 2010	5AJN17	5.36
Following Hayley's wedding, Francine and Stan have a clash over how to raise Steve. Francine wishes to be more lenient, while Stan is convinced they need to be firm with him. Stan creates a clone of Steve, named Steve-A-Rino, to determine who has better parenting skills. Steve-A-Rino, resentful of Stan's oppressive methods, swaps places with the real Steven. When Francine discovers decapitated cat heads in his backpack, Steve-A-Rino's identity is exposed. Francine and Stan fight off Steve-A-Rino, saving the real Steve, and Steve-A-Rino is shot by a cat. Meanwhile, Roger decides to go after Hayley and Jeff to steal the $50,000. The couple embark on a trip across Asia in an effort to escape Roger, finally surrendering when Roger corners them at the Great Wall of China, however Hayley and Jeff have used all the money in their attempts to get away from Roger.
99	3	"Best Little Horror House in Langley Falls"	John Aoshima & Jansen Yee	Eric Weinberg	November 7, 2010	5AJN19	6.30
After years of hosting the scariest haunted house in the neighborhood, Stan finds himself outdone by a former design and development specialist for Disney theme parks named Buckle (first seen in An Apocalypse to Remember). Francine makes things worse when she finds herself returning with wet pants and declares that it is impossible to beat him. Depressed, Stan goes to Roger for advice and Roger suggests he use his CIA influence to get real body parts and instruments. Stan decides to pull in five of the most dangerous serial murderers in the area. However, the killers sitting in their cell fails to scare anyone so Roger decides to turn them loose, forcing Stan, Francine, Roger and Klaus to take cover in the kitchen. Meanwhile, Steve and his friends take Akiko trick-or-treating while a frustrated Toshi refuses to take up the samurai costume his mother got for him. Toshi eventually does wear the outfit, only to chase down Steve when he fails to hold a promise with him. After Steve defuses the situation, Toshi leaves him alone and instead takes out his rage by brutally murdering the five serial killers after they chase Stan, Francine and Roger out their house all the way to an abandoned factory. Roger brings home one of their severed heads as a souvenir.
100	4	"Stan's Food Restaurant"	Josue Cervantes	Brian Boyle	November 14, 2010	5AJN16	5.38
Roger offers to help Stan live out his dream of opening a restaurant until their difference in vision for what the eatery should be causes havoc. It ends up with Stan getting cut of the project and opening his own restaurant next to Roger's. Stan puts Roger's restaurant out of business, causing Roger to blow up both of their restaurants. Meanwhile, a girl named Ashley (Hayden Panettiere), who got kicked out of a school for having too much sex, invites Steve and Snot over to her house. Trouble ensues when Ashley mistakenly accuses Snot of raping her doll, Julia. Steve and Snot write a suicide note for Julia to get Ashley to forget about her, but Ashley becomes convinced Julia was murdered causing Steve to storm off and call Ashley a weirdo.
101	5	"White Rice"	Bob Bowen	Rick Wiener & Kenny Schwartz	November 21, 2010	5AJN15	4.86
After a fight between Stan and Francine breaks out, Stan suggests they go and see a counselor named Sal (Jason Alexander), who turns out to be a hypnotist Stan has been using for years to settle arguments by repressing her memories. After feeling slighted by Stan, who walks out to get a sandwich by the time he asked Stan for one, Sal makes Francine remember everything, including her old desire to be a stand-up comedian and that Hayley had a twin brother who died due to Stan refusing to pay for vaccinations. Stan ends up living alone when Francine is offered the chance to have a television show based on her life made; however, it is canceled due to racist jokes. Stan learns his lesson about not talking to Francine and agrees that the idea of moving her foster parents to their town is a bad idea, seeing that talking about their problems is not as bad as he thought. Meanwhile, Steve brings home a female fish to keep Klaus company. However, after having children with the fish, Klaus finds he detests her due to her eating their offspring, burying her alive in the yard.
102	6	"There Will Be Bad Blood"	Joe Daniello	Murray Miller & Judah Miller	November 28, 2010	5AJN20	6.13
The Smiths prepare for the arrival of Stan's half-brother, Rusty's (Lou Diamond Phillips) family for Thanksgiving. However, it gets subdued because of Steve's brattiness following Hayley and Jeff's eloping. They decide to go to Rusty's to see what their home is like. However, it is revealed that Rusty became rich after discovering land given to him by his grandfather (Ed Asner) contained massive copper reserves. The Smiths try to pull the old switcheroo on Rusty, resulting in getting trapped in the desert. However, they are saved by Hayley and Jeff. In the end, Stan lets Hayley and Jeff move into their home after what they'd done.
103	7	"The People vs. Martin Sugar"	Pam Cooke	Jonathan Fener	December 5, 2010	5AJN05	5.31
Stan Smith anxiously awaits his annual jury summons. But when Roger is the defendant in the trial where Stan is the foreman, he is finally in a position to make Roger accountable for his misdeeds. Roger gets the last laugh when he escapes from prison. Meanwhile, Jeff and Hayley move in with the Smiths, and Francine tries (and fails) to get Jeff to clean up his act due to him needing to be stoned in order to keep his libido in check.
104	8	"For Whom the Sleigh Bell Tolls"	Bob Bowen	Erik Durbin	December 12, 2010	5AJN22	6.22
Stan gives Steve a gun for Christmas, even though Francine warns him that Steve is too young. After Steve accidentally shoots Santa, he sends the North Pole into a tizzy and jeopardizes Christmas, triggering a massive gunfight between the Smiths themselves and all the elves and reindeer from the North Pole with Santa Claus himself leading the charge.
105	9	"Fart-Break Hotel"	Rodney Clouden	Chris McKenna & Matt McKenna	January 16, 2011	5AJN18	3.54
After Roger releases lethal gas into the Smith residence thanks to Francine feeding him okra, the family moves into a hotel while the fumes clear. A bored Francine attends a concrete industry convention at the hotel and adopts the identity of one of the registered attendees. Meanwhile, Steve tries to go to the 80's to meet a girl from a painting he saw.
106	10	"Stanny Boy and Frantastic"	Pam Cooke	Laura McCreary	January 23, 2011	5AJN13	4.81
Finding that they have no friends that like the both of them, Stan and Francine steal tickets to a show from Hayley and unintentionally make friends with a younger couple. Soon, their (highly dangerous) life style proves too much for Stan and Francine; they sabotage their birth control products to force them into being less active. However, this causes the couple to break up and reconcile their differences once Stan and Francine reveal the truth to them, losing their friends.
107	11	"A Piñata Named Desire"	Bob Bowen	Chris McKenna & Matt McKenna	February 13, 2011	5AJN07	3.93
Roger asks Stan to attend an acting class, but tempers flare when they audition for the same role, which Hayley believes is underlying sexual tension between the two. Meanwhile, Steve and his friends have their last slumber party as kids.
108	12	"You Debt Your Life"	Chris Bennett	Erik Sommers	February 20, 2011	5AJN09	4.25
Roger moves out of the house after realizing that Stan only kept him as part of a "life debt" deal, but Roger's replacement -- Andy Dick -- turns out to be worse than Roger. Meanwhile, Steve is chosen to do morning announcements at Pearl Bailey High, but lets the position go to his head.
109	13	"I Am the Walrus"	Tim Parsons	Keith Heisler	March 27, 2011	5AJN21	4.99
Steve challenges Stan for dominance, with Stan winning as he does "the one thing Steve will never have". Meanwhile, Jeff and Hayley try marriage counseling -- and end up being held hostage by Principal Lewis.
110	14	"School Lies"	Rodney Clouden	Brian Boyle	April 3, 2011	6AJN03	3.59
Stan arranges a plan to get a raise through a favor of U.S Senator Buckingham (Burt Reynolds). The first part of his plan is to send Steve to the private school where Buckingham's daughter, Cookie, goes to (though Steve refuses to go, so Stan uses Roger). The second part is to meet Buckingham there and talks him into playing golf with him. Stan gets his favor, but then he is enraged that Roger sold Cookie to drug dealers, while they were high on Cocaine. He gets her back, and he takes her back to Buckingham's house for dinner, even though Buckingham knew about Cookie's drug issue. Meanwhile, Steve is out of school because of an Asbestos outbreak, and after refusing to go to the private school, he joins a gang of Spanish thugs. He is arrested for robbing a pharmacy, prompting Stan to use his favor to release him from jail. However, this causes Stan to frame a student from the private school for the armed robbery. He is seen riding away with John Q. Mind (Randy Spears) to have further adventures.
111	15	"License to Till"	John Aoshima & Jansen Yee	Matt Fusfeld & Alex Cuthbertson	April 10, 2011	6AJN04	3.35
Roger and Klaus make a bet about whether Roger can make Steve cool--which is Steve's own wish. While he dreams of being with the cool kids, his reality currently involves helping out on Snot's Uncle Solomon's farm. After several attempts by Roger to get Steve recognized by his peers, Roger nearly throws in the towel. Fortunately Roger manages to convince Steve to borrow Solomon's tractor to use so that Steve can ferry drunken party-goers everywhere. The plan works and Steve is recognized, until during one trip when Steve loses a lens on his glasses making him unable to drive. Meanwhile, Stan and Francine spice things up by pranking each other, but it goes too far.
112	16	"Jenny Fromdabloc"	Bob Bowen	Laura McCreary	April 17, 2011	6AJN08	4.74
Steve tries to cheer up Snot after Hayley rejects him -- so he convinces Roger to dress up in his best teenage girl persona and give Snot some confidence back. However, when Roger starts dating Snot under his new persona he starts to take the relationship too far which leaves Steve extremely disturbed and Snot becoming egotistic about finding love before his friends did. Meanwhile, Stan tries to live like a man of the 1960s by making Francine serve him martinis after work, despite that Stan can't hold his liquor.
113	17	"Home Wrecker"	Joe Daniello	Alan R. Cohen & Alan Freedland	May 8, 2011	6AJN05	3.29
Stan and Francine divide the house after arguing over how it should be decorated. Meanwhile, Principal Lewis accidentally discovers that Barry is a genius at counting cards so he conscripts Steve and company in helping him scam a Casino run by a Chinese mafia group. However, when Lewis hogs all the money for himself Steve and company abandon him and start counting cards on their own. Eventually Lewis discovers their plot and reveals it to the casino as revenge leading Toshi to destroy his disguise (Lewis owed the Casino $22,014) causing the Casino guards to chase them all down.
114	18	"Flirting with Disaster"	Pam Cooke	Keith Heisler	May 15, 2011	6AJN06	3.93
Francine begins working at the CIA office with Stan, which makes Stan uncomfortable. Meanwhile, Steve and Roger build birdhouses for cash.
115	19	"Gorillas in the Mist"	Chris Bennett	Erik Durbin	May 22, 2011	6AJN10	3.57
Steve and Stan begin acting more like friends than father and son, which turns to disaster when Steve ends up cutting school to go to the zoo. Meanwhile, Roger marries an abusive, white trash woman so he can experience the pain and heartbreak found in country songs.

== Home media release ==
All nineteen episodes of the seventh season were released on DVD by 20th Century Fox in the United States on April 17, 2012, and in the United Kingdom on May 14, 2012.

American Dad Volume 7 release dates
Region 1	April 17, 2012
Region 2	May 14, 2012
Region 4	May 22, 2012
