= Your Show of Shows (The Cleveland Show) =

- The Cleveland Show episode
- Episode no.: Season 2 Episode 21
- Directed by: Oreste Canestrelli
- Story by: Carl Reiner
- Teleplay by: Matt Murray; Aseem Batra
- Production code: 2APS21
- Original air date: May 8, 2011

Guest appearances
- T-Pain as Theodore; Carl Reiner as Murray; Will.i.am as Bernard

Episode chronology
← Previous "Back to Cool"	Next → "Hot Cocoa Bang Bang"
- The Cleveland Show season 2

"Your Show of Shows" is the twenty-first and penultimate episode of the second season of the American animated television series The Cleveland Show, and the 42nd episode overall. It originally aired May 8, 2011 on Fox in the United States. In this episode, Rallo and his friends perform in the school talent show, but their rap about fiscal responsibility is not well received by their classmates. Meanwhile, after Cleveland gets his own Public-access television cable TV show, the reviews are less than positive so he takes some tips from the most successful daytime talk shows that appeal to women.

This episode was directed by Oreste Canestrelli and written by Matt Murray, Aseem Batra and Carl Reiner. It received mixed reviews from critics from the main storyline and the cultural references. According to the Nielsen ratings, the episode was viewed by 5.31 million viewers and garnered a 2.2 rating in the 18-49 demographic during its initial airing. It featured guest appearances from will.i.am and T-Pain, as well as several recurring voice actors and actresses for the series.

"Your Show of Shows" was originally intended to air as the twenty second episode of the second season of The Cleveland Show, airing a week after Night of the Hurricane, a crossover event between The Cleveland Show, American Dad! and Family Guy. However, just two days before its planned airing, it was announced by Fox that Night of the Hurricane would be pushed back until next season, due to a series of real-life tornadoes that killed nearly 300 people in the Southern United States.

== Plot ==
When Rallo and his pals Bernard and Theodore try to come up with an act for the school performance show, their idea for a karate act fails, they open up to Murray who writes them a song about fiscal responsibility that bombs with the kids at school.

Meanwhile, after Cleveland impresses his co-workers with his impressions, they suggest he create his own late-night talk show to replace a cable-access series that recently was canceled. Reviews for the show after the first episode are scathing, so Cleveland decides to retool the late-night comedy show as an afternoon talk show.

Despite Rallo, Bernard and Theodore's song striking out with the other students, the parents love it and Cleveland books them on his show. Backstage, Murray arrives with a new song to make amends for making Rallo and his friends outcasts with their classmates that shocks the audience with its obscene lyrics but does result in getting the respect of their friends back. Cleveland is fired from the show by Mr. Waterman but Donna auditions to be his replacement by playing her recorder.

== Production ==
"Your Show of Shows" was directed by series regular Oreste Canestrelli, in his third episode of the season. This would be the first episode that Canestrelli would direct since the season two episode "The Blue, The Gray and The Brown". This episode's teleplay was written by series regulars Matt Murray and Aseem Batra. This would be the second time Matt Murray and Aseem Batra have written an episode. The episode's storyline was written by actor Carl Reiner. This would be the first time Reiner wrote an episode on The Cleveland Show. He previously guest starred in the season two episode "Murray Christmas". Seth MacFarlane, the creator and executive producer of The Cleveland Show, as well as its sister shows Family Guy and American Dad!, served as the executive producer for the episode, along with series veterans Mike Henry and Richard Appel. This episode featured guest appearances from Will.i.am and T-Pain, as well as several recurring voice actors and actresses for the series.

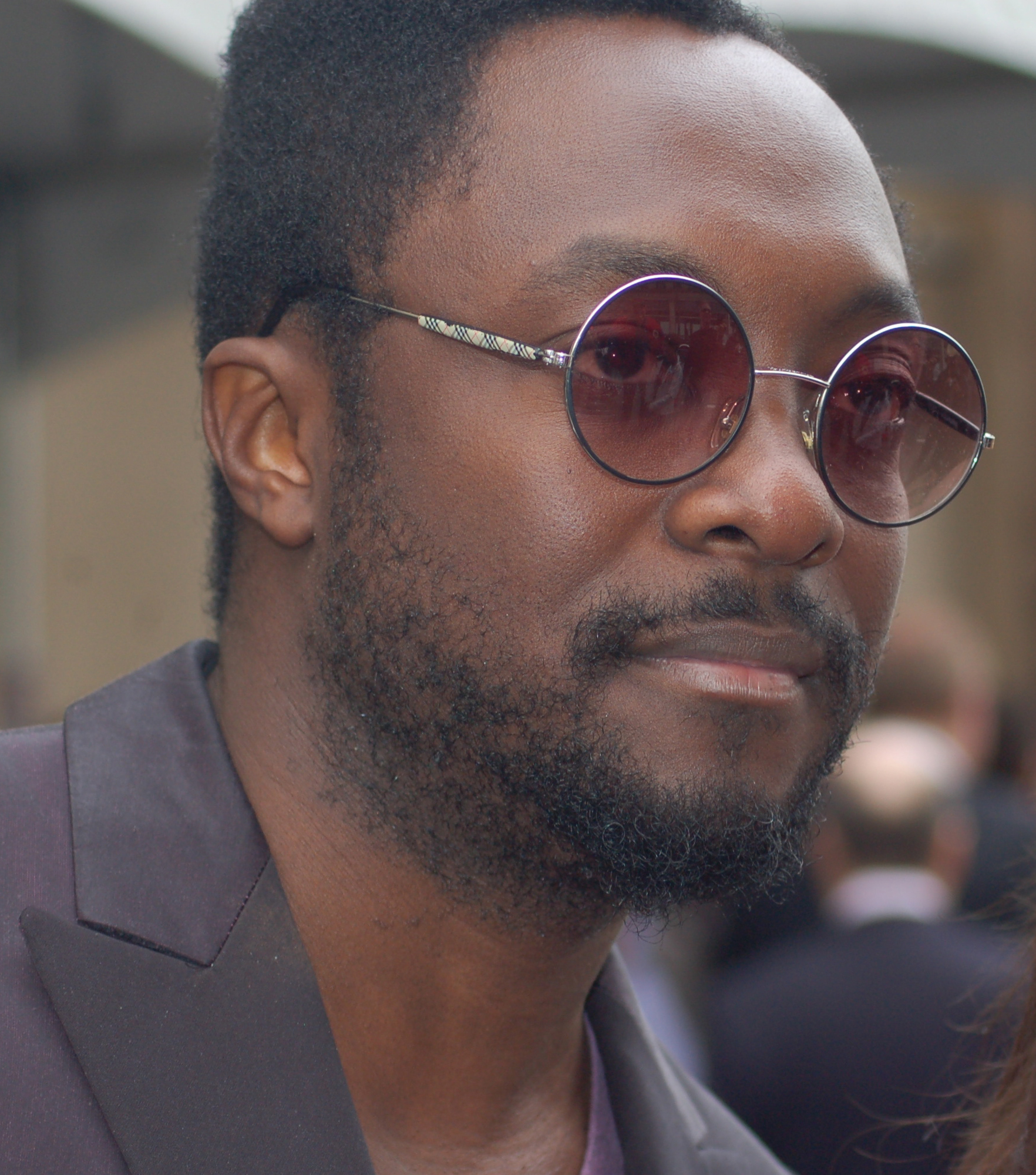
Will.i.am guest starred in this episode as one of Rallo's friends, Bernard.

"Your Show of Shows" was originally intended to air as the twenty second episode of the second season of The Cleveland Show, airing a week after the third part of a fictional crossover event between American Dad!, The Cleveland Show, and Family Guy. However just two days before its planned airing, it was announced by the executive of the entertainment division of the Fox Broadcasting Company that the event was pushed back until next season, due to a series of tornadoes that killed nearly 300 people in the Southern United States.

== Reception ==
"Your Show of Shows" was first broadcast on May 8, 2011 as part of the animation television night on Fox. The episode aired on the second spot of the line-up, a spot generally taken by Bob's Burgers. It was preceded by a rerun of The Simpsons, and succeeded by its sister show Family Guy and American Dad!. It was viewed by 5.31 million viewers upon its original airing. The total viewership of the episode was on par with that of American Dad!, but significantly lower than that of Family Guy. It achieved a 2.2 rating in the 18-49 demographic, according to the Nielsen ratings. Ratings for the episode were slightly above that of American Dad!, while significantly lower than that of Family Guy. The episode's total viewership and ratings were significantly up from the previous episode, "Ship'rect", which was viewed by 3.35 million viewers upon its initial airing, and garnered a 1.8 rating in the 18-49 demographic.

Demon TV gave it a mostly positive review.
