= Stanny Boy and Frantastic =

- American Dad! episode
- Episode no.: Season 7 Episode 10
- Directed by: Pam Cooke & Valerie Fletcher
- Written by: Laura McCreary
- Production code: 5AJN13
- Original air date: January 23, 2011

Guest appearances
- Paget Brewster; Sarah Chalke as Cami; Anthony Michael Hall as Tom; Kevin Michael Richardson as Circus Performer; Elmarie Wendel

Episode chronology
← Previous "Fart-Break Hotel"	Next → "A Piñata Named Desire"
- American Dad! season 7

"Stanny Boy and Frantastic" is the tenth episode of the seventh season of American Dad!. It aired on Fox in the United States on January 23, 2011. This episode centers around the couple of Stan and Francine, who are bored with their lives. In a desperate attempt to get out of the house, Stan and Francine take Hayley's tickets to a circus in order to invite and bond with a couple. While at the show, they both meet Tom and Cami, a young couple. All four go out on various outings, and Stan and Francine begin to have trouble keeping up with the fast-paced lifestyle of Cami and Tom.

This episode was written by Laura McCreary, and directed by Pam Cooke and Valerie Fletcher. It received mostly positive reception upon its release, with much of the praise stemming from the main storyline. It was watched by 4.80 million homes during its original airing. It featured guest appearances from Paget Brewster, Sarah Chalke, Anthony Michael Hall, Kevin Michael Richardson, and Elmarie Wendel.

== Plot ==
Concerned that their lives are becoming boring, Stan and Francine set out to make some new friends. They run into a young couple named Tom and Cami who have an active, child-free lifestyle, and to maintain the friendship Stan and Francine pretend to be young and childless as well. However, Tom and Cami engage in such activities as rock climbing, free running (which is parodied off District 13), and much drinking, which begins to take its toll on the Smiths. Unable to keep up but not wanting to lose their friends, they sabotage the couple's birth control in the hopes that having a baby will slow them down. Unfortunately, the unexpected pregnancy ruins Tom and Cami's relationship. When Stan and Francine try to patch it up they accidentally confess to the sabotage and to being in their 40s, ending the friendship. After having been through all this, however, Stan and Francine decide that they like being "slow" and relaxed.

Meanwhile, Roger and Steve see an advertisement for a cotton candy shooting gun and decide to buy it using Greg Corbin's credit card. Klaus asks to get in on the action, but the pair insults him, saying that fish can't enjoy portable things or cotton candy. When the gun turns out to be a dud, they decide to get a refund but start to reconsider when they hear the projected wait time is 2 weeks, only for Klaus to convince them to stick it out. After 2 weeks of frustration and getting transferred to the wrong person, they finally get through to a real person and are told how to get a refund. Klaus observes that the money will return to Greg, not them. Roger and Steve then realize this and ask Klaus why he had them stay on hold; Klaus explains it was revenge for the two saying he couldn't enjoy portable things, then adds that while he can't enjoy cotton candy, he can enjoy making them suffer, as they'll never get back the 2 weeks they wasted. After he leaves laughing hysterically, Roger asks Steve if they are stupid, as Roger has a master's degree in city planning from Howard University, but can't tell when "a fish is giving me the business."

== Production ==
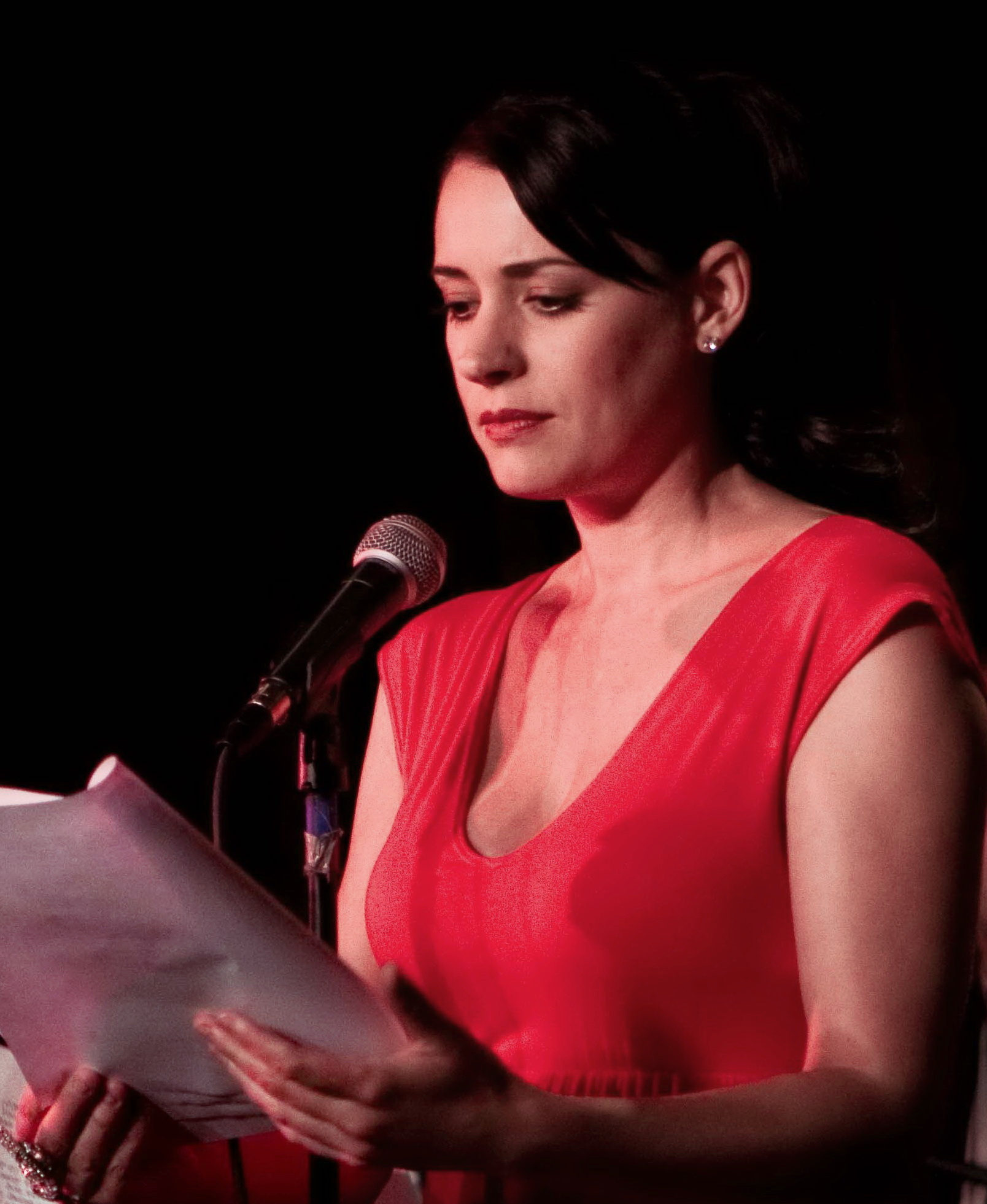
Paget Brewster made a guest appearance on the show.

"Stanny Boy and Frantastic" was written by Laura McCreary, and directed by Pam Cooke and Valerie Fletcher. In addition to the main cast, Sarah Chalke guest starred in the episode as Cami, and Anthony Michael Hall would play the role of Tom. Paget Brewster and Elmarie Wendel would guest star as uncredited roles. This would be the first time Brewster would make a guest appearance on American Dad since the season 6 episode "Rapture's Delight." Along with reprising her role as Hayley, Rachael MacFarlane would voice various recurring characters. Recurring voice actor Kevin Michael Richardson also made a minor appearance as well.

== Reception ==
"Stanny Boy and Frantastic" was broadcast on January 23, 2011, as part of the animated television line-up on Fox. It was the first show on the block, the second consecutive week that it started the "Animation Domination" line-up. It was followed by The Simpsons, Bob's Burgers, and its sister shows Family Guy and The Cleveland Show. It was viewed by 4.80 million households, despite airing simultaneously with America's Funniest Home Videos on ABC, the AFC Championship game on CBS, and Dateline NBC. The episode acquired a 2.2/5 rating in the 18-49 demographic, a significant increase from the previous episode, as well as a 34% increase in total viewership from the previous episode "Fart-break Hotel", which was viewed by 3.58 million households during its initial airing.

"Stanny Boy and Frantastic" was met with generally positive reviews from television critics. Rowan Kaiser of The A.V. Club wrote, "After a somewhat dull episode last week, American Dad moved back into form with a decent episode about Stan and Francine making friends with a younger couple." However, he would criticize the subplot of the episode, saying that the rest of the episode was a "distraction". He went on to give the episode a B, the highest grade of the night tying with The Cleveland Show episode "Like a Boss", and Bob's Burgers episode "Sacred Cow", while scoring higher than The Simpsons episode "Homer the Father". Jason Hughes of TV Squad wrote, "I like when a comedy speaks to me on something I can relate to. And I think American Dad was clever enough in approaching how our lives change as we get older in a way that both sides of the situation can relate to."
