= Best Little Horror House in Langley Falls =

- American Dad! episode
- Episode no.: Season 7 Episode 3
- Directed by: John Aoshima; Jansen Yee
- Written by: Eric Weinberg
- Production code: 5AJN19
- Original air date: November 7, 2010

Guest appearances
- Lisa Edelstein as Shari Rothberg; Sandra Oh as Hiko Yoshida; Grace Park as Akiko Yoshida

Episode chronology
← Previous "Son of Stan"	Next → "Stan's Food Restaurant"
- American Dad! season 7

"Best Little Horror House in Langley Falls" is the third episode of the seventh season of the animated comedy series American Dad! It originally aired on Fox in the United States on November 7, 2010. The episode follows Stan as his title of having the best haunted house is threatened by a neighbor. To tempt people to come to his house, he uses serial killers as the house's main attraction. Meanwhile, Steve falls in love with Toshi's sister Akiko as they go trick-or-treating.

The episode was written by Eric Weinberg and directed by John Aoshima and Jansen Yee. It received generally positive reviews from critics. According to Nielsen ratings, it was watched by 6.30 million viewers in its original airing, which was a notable improvement from the previous episode.

== Plot ==
After hosting the scariest haunted house in the neighborhood for years, Stan finds himself outdone by his neighbor Buckle. Francine makes things worse when she finds herself returning and declares that it is impossible to beat him. Depressed, Stan goes to Roger for advice, and Roger suggests he use his CIA influence to get genuine body parts and instruments. Stan decides to pull in 5 of the most dangerous serial killers in the area.

The killers sitting in their cell fail to scare anyone, so Roger tries to make them scarier. First he gets them riled up and horny (by ripping off Francine's costume in front of them, leaving her in her underwear for the rest of the episode) and then he lets them loose, causing them to go on a killing spree; forcing Stan, Francine, Roger and Klaus to hide in the kitchen. Stan uses Roger to block the door from opening. While everyone is trapped in the kitchen Stan admits his haunted house efforts were to impress Francine, as he wants her to support him no matter what. Francine apologizes for not being supportive (though Stan takes the opportunity to shift the blame of their situation to her).

Meanwhile, Steve, Barry, and Snot arrive at Toshi's house to go trick or treating, but Toshi refuses to wear the samurai costume his mother got him. Toshi's mom asks Steve if they would mind taking his younger sister, Akiko, with them, whom Steve immediately falls for when he sees her dressed as Chun Li. Toshi allows them to go out if they have Akiko back by sundown. Steve ignores this and decides to keep trick or treating with Akiko anyway. They find out Toshi is looking for them, now wearing the samurai costume and wielding a katana to kill Steve, so they hide in a cave under the Langley Falls. Steve starts to move in on Akiko until Toshi bursts in and chases him to Vince Chung's Halloween party. Steve tells Toshi he is smothering his sister; Toshi agrees and leaves them together. Akiko admits she has a crush on another boy named Doug, because despite being 9 years old, he is an incredible dancer.

The serial killers burst into the kitchen and chase Stan and the others through the woods. They are cornered at an abandoned factory, but are saved when Toshi arrives and kills the serial killers with his katana. The family contentedly heads home, and Roger takes one killer's head for sexual purposes.

== Production ==
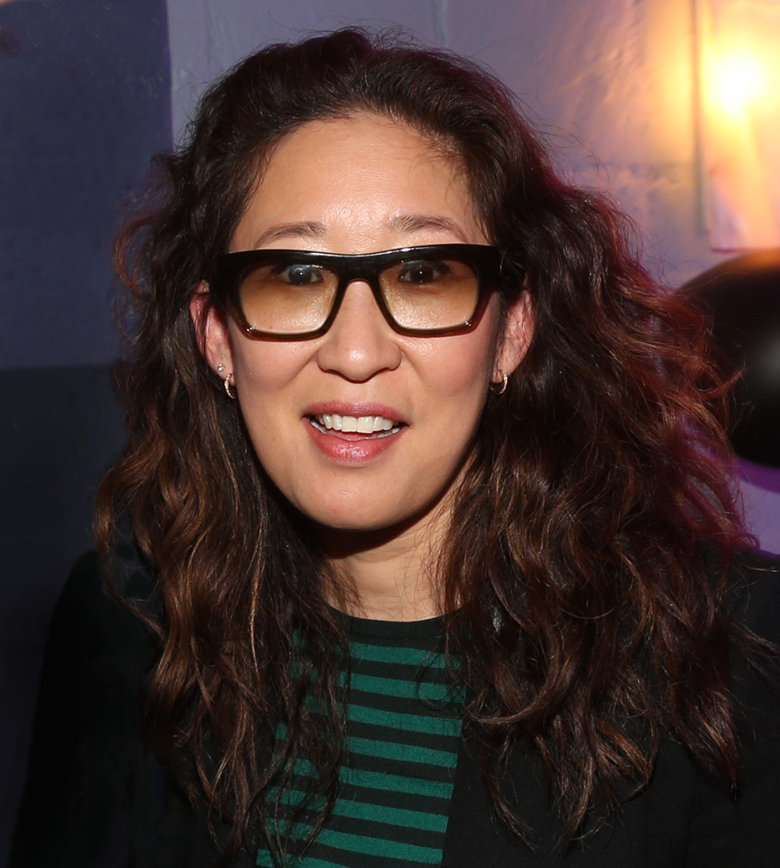
Sandra Oh guest starred in the episode

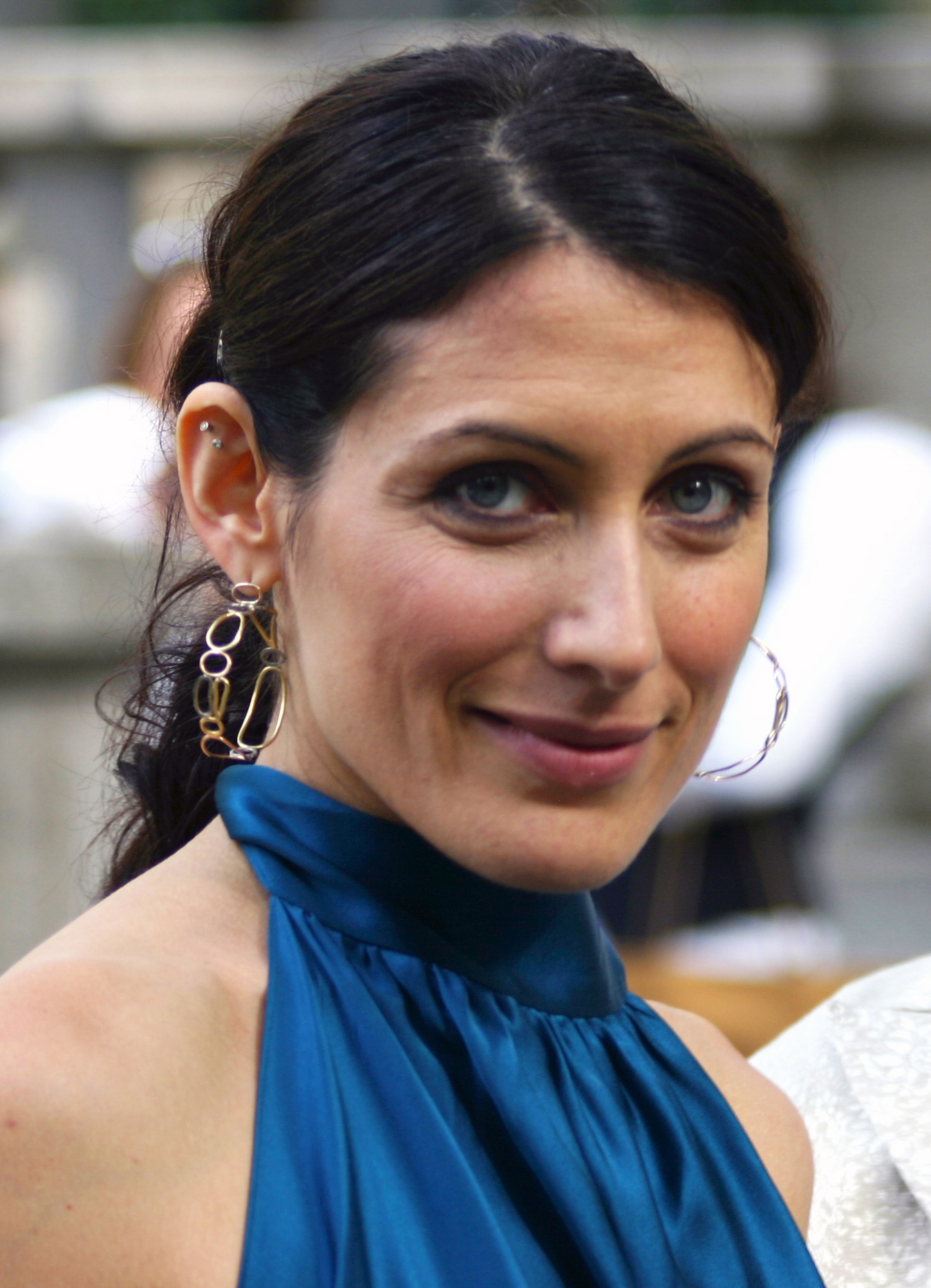
Lisa Edelstein reprises her character Shari

The episode was directed by John Aoshima and Jansen Yee, and written by Eric Weinberg. Despite being one of the main characters, Hayley does not appear in this episode. In addition to the regular cast, Sandra Oh guest starred as Toshi's mother. Oh reprised her role from the episode "Weiner of Our Discontent". Actress Lisa Edelstein reprised her role as Shari, having previously voiced that part in "Phantom of the Telethon" from season four. Edelstein also had a smaller part in the season seven premiere "100 A.D." Recurring voice actors Curtis Armstrong, Daisuke Suzuki and Eddie Kaye Thomas reprised their roles as Snot, Toshi and Barry respectively. Kevin Michael Richardson made a minor appearance in the episode as the lead serial killer.

== Reception ==
"Best Little Horror House in Langley Falls" was broadcast on November 7, 2010, as a part of an animated television night on Fox, and was preceded by an episode of MacFarlane's show Family Guy. It was watched by 6.30 million viewers in its original airing, according to Nielsen ratings, despite being aired simultaneously as Desperate Housewives on ABC, The Amazing Race on CBS and Sunday Night Football on NBC. The episode also acquired a 2.9 rating in the 18–49 demographic, finishing fourth in its timeslot. In total viewership, the episode was up 17.5% from the previous episode, "Son of Stan", which aired on October 10, 2010 and had a viewership of 5.36 million.

The episode received generally positive reviews from television critics. Jason Hughes of TV Squad wrote a mixed review of the episode and noted that "[t]hey should have kept the focus more completely on the holiday, though maybe [Seth] MacFarlane was worried he'd said about all he could about Halloween in three back-to-back episodes." Hughes compared the episode to "horror movies of the old" and said that the episode's "imagination is far better than anything [that] can be seen on television." In a simultaneous review of the episodes of The Simpsons, The Cleveland Show and Family Guy that preceded the episode, Emily VanDerWerff of The A.V. Club wrote: "As always, it fell to American Dad to try to prop up the rest of the night, and fortunately, the episode was capable of doing so. ... This wasn't the strongest American Dad ever, but it had some very funny bits and a coherent storyline that didn't try too hard to shock." She gave the episode a B+, the highest grade of the night, higher than The Cleveland Show episode "It's the Great Pancake, Cleveland Brown", The Simpsons episode "Treehouse of Horror XXI", and Family Guy episode "Halloween on Spooner Street".
