= It's the Great Pancake, Cleveland Brown =

- The Cleveland Show episode
- Episode no.: Season 2 Episode 4
- Directed by: Ron Rubio
- Written by: Aseem Batra
- Production code: 2APS04
- Original air date: November 7, 2010

Episode chronology
← Previous "How Cleveland Got His Groove Back"	Next → "Little Man on Campus"

It's the Great Pancake, Cleveland Brown is the fourth episode of the second season of the American animated television series The Cleveland Show, and the 25th episode overall. It originally aired on November 7, 2010 on Fox.

The episode was written by Aseem Batra and directed by series regular Ron Rubio before the conclusion of the second production season. The episode was the first Halloween special of the series.

== Plot ==
Cleveland Jr. dresses up as a pancake for Halloween and wants to go out trick-or-treating. But Cleveland says that he is too old for trick-or-treating and leaves him home to pass out candy while he Donna, Rallo, and Roberta go trick-or-treating.

After giving candy to a trick-or-treater dressed as Harry Potter, Junior decides to go trick-or-treating anyway. He puts on his pancake costume and goes out, only for a gang of popular bullies from his school led by football team captain, Oliver Wilkerson, to egg him and vandalize the outside of the Browns' house and Halloween decorations. The Browns get back from trick-or-treating, they see that their house vandalized. A battered pumpkin told them that Junior left. Later on, Cleveland talks to Junior about what happened. Cleveland and Donna go into Junior's room and sees that he is giving away all of his childhood toys. Donna suggests that he should stop him from getting rid of what defines him. Later on, Cleveland changes Junior's personality and appearance to make him like a rapper. He acts differently, which makes Donna believe that he is not happy. In bed, Junior looks at his old pictures of him and his stuffed animals, and says that he misses his old self. When Roberta announces she is attending Oliver Wilkerson's party, Junior goes, too in an effort to launch his new personality as a cool kid. However, when Cleveland drives to the party to check on him, he sees Oliver and his friends still bullying him. Donna says that Cleveland has created a monster out of Junior. and Cleveland decides to change him back. He brings Junior's stuffed leopard Larry and pancake costume back so he can help him figure out who he really is. They then go trick-or-treating with Cleveland's friends. They throw toilet paper at Oliver's house and start throwing eggs at him and his gang in retaliation for their cruelty towards Junior.

Meanwhile, Rallo decides on eating too much candy, without listening to what his mother said about not overdoing it. He grows to have a big stomach full of candy. Then, he decided to eat one last piece of candy, which causes his tooth to break off. Rallo figures that Donna was right about his teeth rotting out. Rallo is trying to figure out where to hide his broken tooth so Donna would not find out about it. He hides it under his pillow and finds a quarter under it the next day. He ends up telling Donna about what happened and she explains what happened when Rallo's tooth was taken, inspiring Rallo to try to gain further visits after newly discovering the Tooth Fairy.

== Production ==
The episode was written by series regular Aseem Batra and directed by series regular Ron Rubio before the conclusion of the second production season. The episode was the first Halloween special of the series.

== Reception ==
"It's the Great Pancake, Cleveland Brown" was broadcast on November 7, 2010, as a part Animation Domination line-up of animated television on FOX following The Simpsons "Treehouse of Horror XXI". It was watched by 6.70 million viewers in its original airing, according to Nielsen ratings. Despite being up against 60 Minutes and the opening kickoff of Sunday Night Football, the episode received a season's high mark of 3.1 rating in the 18–49 demographic, placing it 3rd in its time slot and 3rd in the FOX animation sequence with slightly higher viewership than the American Dad! episode that followed. In total viewership, the episode was up 19.0% from the previous episode, "How Cleveland Got His Groove Back", which aired on October 10, 2010 and had a viewership of 5.63 million.

TV Squad's Jason Hughs imagined young Seth McFarland "...wanting to dress up for Halloween but being told by his parents that he's too old and he'll get made fun of" and "...getting bullied by the bigger kids and being robbed of his candy." so the episode has Cleveland Jr. getting picked on for being "...too young and too old for trick-or-treating" while later joining his father and cohorts in bullying smaller kids and throwing eggs at Oliver. Jason Hughes loved the punchline to the egg throwing when Cleveland tells Jr that "...he was on his own for the repercussions of their actions.". In a combined review of the FOX animation block, Emily VanDerWerff of The A.V. Club liked how consistent Cleveland Jr. is during the life of the series but gave the episode a 'C', saying: "...focusing the show's Halloween episode on the idea that Cleveland, Jr., was at that awkward age between being young enough to go trick or treating and old enough to dress up for Halloween parties was a good choice. [...] the rest of the episode was [...] a King of the Hill-esque story about how Cleveland doesn't really understand his son." and "...too much of the episode was only worth a bored shrug [...] though I did like Roberta as a slutty ghost".
