= Fart-Break Hotel =

- American Dad! episode
- Episode no.: Season 7 Episode 9
- Directed by: Rodney Clouden
- Written by: Chris McKenna; Matt McKenna
- Production code: 5AJN18
- Original air date: January 16, 2011

Guest appearances
- Héctor Elizondo as himself / Concierge; Will Forte as Convention Attendee; Richard Gant as Narrator; Missi Pyle as Pam Deakins; Kevin Michael Richardson as Hegel's Associate / Convention Attendee; J.K. Simmons as Jed Farnsworth; Alan Tudyk as Hegel

Episode chronology
← Previous "For Whom the Sleigh Bell Tolls"	Next → "Stanny Boy and Frantastic"
- American Dad! season 7

"Fart-Break Hotel" is the ninth episode of the seventh season of American Dad!. It originally aired on Fox in the United States on January 16, 2011. The episode follows housewife Francine as she becomes frustrated and bored with her daily routine of caring for her family. However, when Roger accidentally releases lethal gas in the house, the family moves into a luxury hotel for a week. While there, Francine decides to assume the identity and lifestyle of a recently deceased, child-free concrete saleswoman named Sarah Blanch.

The episode was written by Chris and Matt McKenna, and directed by Rodney Clouden. It received mixed reception among television critics upon its release, with many criticizing the main storyline. It was viewed by 3.58 million homes upon its original airing. The episode features guest appearances from Héctor Elizondo, Will Forte, Richard Gant, Missi Pyle, Kevin Michael Richardson, J.K. Simmons, and Alan Tudyk.

== Plot ==
Francine's daily routine starts to get to her when the family complains about dinner being prepared with the wrong vegetable (okra). She imagines herself killing the family in revenge; after Francine threatens them, they agree to eat the dinner anyway. Roger warns the family that he will have a bad reaction to the okra but eats it at Stan's urging. He farts a noxious gas during the middle of the night, prompting the family to leave their residence and stay for one week at a hotel in D.C., which they are allowed to do for free, as Roger once stayed at the hotel and suffered an accident there.

Discovering that she has never taken the time to get in touch with herself, Francine decides to spend the day assuming the identity of a recently deceased concrete saleswoman, Sarah Blanch. At a work convention held at the hotel, Francine becomes increasingly impressed with the exciting life she has fabricated for Sarah and fully assumes her identity. Roger, attending the convention as a depressed salesman named Pete Pendelman, strongly advises her against becoming too absorbed in the character, to no avail. She demonstrates business prowess that lands her a CEO job in Portland. Francine gives up her former life and family to pursue a new life as Sarah.

Meanwhile, at the hotel, Steve becomes drawn to a Patrick Nagel painting of a woman. The concierge, Héctor Elizondo, explains that the portrait was painted at the hotel in 1981. Steve is disappointed that he cannot meet the woman in the portrait, but Héctor tells him that if he uses the power of his mind, he can will himself to travel back in time to meet her. Steve successfully travels back in time and meets Roger in his 1980s persona, Reaganomics Lamborghini, and witnesses the accident that led to the family receiving one week of free lodging. Steve eventually meets Nagel, who drugs his champagne. He awakens naked on a bed and sees the painting of the woman. Nagel explains that he painted Steve, revealing that Steve is the woman in the painting, and the shock returns him to his own time. Héctor later asks Steve if the woman in the painting was himself. When Steve asks how he knew, Héctor reveals that he once fell in love; a painting of him as a woman is then shown.

Ten years in the future, after accepting the CEO position, Francine is a successful but lonely elderly woman. On her way to another convention, she visits her old house and sees that Stan and Steve have moved on with their lives, with Stan having married another woman. She returns to the hotel for another convention and admits to Héctor that she regrets her decision to change her life and abandon her family. Héctor tells her that, with the power of her mind, she can also travel back in time and stop herself. She does so, arriving in the present and telling her past self not to accept the job, convincing her to remain with her family. Francine returns to her usual life but decides to make every Thursday her day, during which she abandons her routine.

== Reception ==
"Fart-Break Hotel" was broadcast on January 16, 2011, as a part of an animated television night on Fox, and was the first show on the line-up, followed by The Simpsons, Bob's Burgers, and its sister shows Family Guy, and The Cleveland Show. It was on a new timeslot of 7:30, as opposed to be the last episode in the Fox Animation Domination line-up. It was watched by 3.58 million viewers, according to Nielsen ratings, despite airing simultaneously with America's Funniest Home Videos on ABC, the 2011 NFL playoffs on CBS and the Golden Globe Awards on NBC. The episode also acquired a 1.7 rating in the 18–49 demographic, the lowest rating of the line-up, in addition to having significantly lower ratings in total viewership. The episode's ratings decreased significantly from the previous episode.

"Fart-Break Hotel" was met with mixed response from most television critics. Rowan Kaiser of The A.V. Club wrote, "There are some conceptual jokes that inspire smiles, like the magical, Platonic concierge, and a few good lines but not much beyond that to salvage a tired premise." However, Kaiser made some positive comments on the opening scene of the episode. She went on to give the episode a C, scoring lower than The Simpsons episode "Flaming Moe", tying with The Cleveland Show episode "How Do You Solve a Problem Like Roberta?", and Bob's Burgers episode "Crawl Space", while scoring higher than the Family Guy episode "And I'm Joyce Kinney". Jason Hughes of the TV Squad also gave it a slightly more positive review, going on to praise the side story. He wrote, "The side story featuring Steve traveling back to 1981 was clever, if not terribly original. It seemed to have elements of Hot Tub Time Machine and Back to the Future and probably some others I'm not remembering, and culminated in the anticlimax of Steve being the model in the painting he so admired." However, he was more critical on the main plot, writing, "Francine's journey wasn't terribly unique either, and again it was odd seeing Roger stand in as the voice of reason. It's as if all the elements that make the Smith family who they are were switched around, and the show wasn't made better because of it."
