= For Whom the Sleigh Bell Tolls =

- American Dad! episode
- Episode no.: Season 7 Episode 8
- Directed by: Bob Bowen
- Written by: Erik Durbin
- Production code: 5AJN22
- Original air date: December 12, 2010

Guest appearance
- Clancy Brown as liquor store manager

Episode chronology
← Previous "The People vs. Martin Sugar"	Next → "Fart-Break Hotel"
- American Dad! season 7

"For Whom the Sleigh Bell Tolls" is the eighth episode of the seventh season of American Dad!. It originally aired on Fox in the United States on December 12, 2010. The episode follows the events caused by Stan Smith, as he gives his son Steve a rifle for Christmas, even though his wife Francine forbade him to. When Steve is practicing shooting, he accidentally kills a mall Santa. The family decides to bury the body in the woods, but it then turns out that it was the real Santa, who wants revenge by killing the Smiths.

The episode was written by Erik Durbin and directed by Bob Bowen. It was slightly modeled after the film 300, and was first announced at San Diego Comic-Con in July 2010. It is the fourth American Dad! Christmas special, following in the footsteps of "The Best Christmas Story Never Told", "The Most Adequate Christmas Ever" and "Rapture's Delight."

The episode was met with mixed reviews from critics, with some of them praising its bloody themes, while others dismissed it for being crude and unoriginal. According to the Nielsen ratings, it was viewed by 6.26 million viewers in its original airing. The episode featured guest performances by Clancy Brown and Jeff Fischer, along with several recurring guest voice actors for the series. The episode features the song "Carol of the Bells" as performed by Pennsylvania metalcore band August Burns Red as its main theme.

== Plot ==
Stan continues to reject the idea that Jeff Fischer is now a member of the family despite Francine's suggestion that he should be included in their family traditions. Despite Francine's objections, Stan gives Steve an AK-47 assault rifle for Christmas and Steve accidentally shoots a mall Santa. Steve, in turn, is shattered emotionally and swears never to pick up a weapon again. Meanwhile, Roger goes off in search of the strongest whiskey possible after having trouble getting drunk, and he is directed to a hillbilly moonshiner in the Chimdale Mountains, named Bob Todd, who teaches him his ways.

Stan convinces Steve to hide the body from Francine and try to find out who the Santa was with his fingerprint, but his DNA is not in the CIA database. Stan dismisses this and doesn't investigate further. Francine quickly discovers the body, and as the family buries the body, she chastises them for not letting her cut off the hands and smash the teeth out, much to their chagrin. The next day, they receive threatening letters, stating that someone knows what they did and that they will be punished. They watch the news and discover that no one feels like it is Christmas, as if someone killed Santa. Feeling doubtful, they then dig up the body and discover it is gone. An elf appears and tells them that it was the real Santa they buried, and that he is recovering and rejuvenating in a bacta tank at the North Pole. Santa vows vengeance on the Smiths, so they take refuge with Roger in Bob Todd's cabin.

Jeff arrives to spend the holiday with Hayley, much to Stan's displeasure. However, Santa soon arrives since Jeff wrote a letter telling him where they would stay. Bob Todd reveals that his airplane-house is also an armoury of guns to fend off an attack of endless waves of armed elves, flying reindeer, and an enormous snowman (reminiscent of a Cave Troll from The Lord of the Rings) led by Santa. Francine snaps Steve out of his fears, ordering him to "pick up a gun this instant and send these toy makers to Hell!". Armed with guns and molotov cocktails, the family and Bob proceed to defend themselves. Santa tries to convince Jeff to abandon the Smiths, recognizing that he was not involved in their plot to hide his body, and by offering a relic from The Golden Compass. Jeff walks to Santa's side but then turns on him and pulls Stan, who was injured, to safety. While Jeff takes care of Stan, Jeff says he thinks Stan is "an ass", but he simply tries to get along with him for Hayley, causing Stan to see Jeff as a real member of the family and apologize. The family is almost overrun until Santa and his army are forced to retreat because they only have until Christmas morning to get vengeance. As Bob Todd gathers reindeer meat for food and sex, Santa disappears, leaving behind a letter warning them that he will return next year to take his revenge and kill them, while the Smith family realizes that they have found a new Christmas tradition.

== Production ==
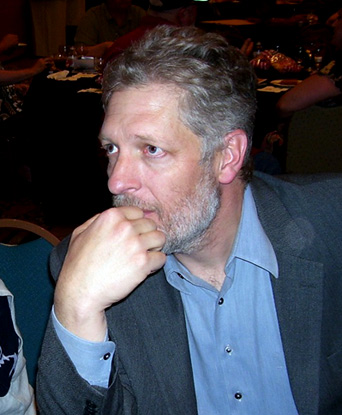
Clancy Brown guest starred as the liquor store manager.

"For Whom the Sleigh Bell Tolls" was written by series regular Erik Durbin and directed by series regular Bob Bowen. The episode was the twenty-second to be produced in the season five production cycle. The first few minutes of the episode were previewed at San Diego Comic-Con in July 2010, but shown in black-and-white form. While writing the episode, the writers tried to come up with a bloody story. Writer Durbin said, "Everybody in the [writing] room kind of was talking about making it as bloody as possible, I think. It was just which movie were we going to model it after. [...] I think ‘300’ got thrown around the most, talking about trying to make it as bloody and cool as ‘300.’" The episode had a TV-14 rating, and series co-creator Seth MacFarlane said that "no kids will ever see it", joking that "They follow those [content ratings] like the f-ing Bible." He also said that the episode informs kids that "Santa really exists". He said, "Except that he’s a crazed murderer. But as long as the tradition is upheld, then I guess that’s all that’s important."

In August 2010, MacFarlane and the voice cast were present at the Television Critics Association (TCA) press tour in Los Angeles, promoting the hundredth episode, "100 A.D." The event also included a table read of "For Whom the Sleigh Bell Tolls", and Gail Pennington of the St. Louis Post-Dispatch wrote, "not much can really be said about the episode except that it includes a mass slaughter of elves." The event also previewed the animation for the final act of the episode. The band August Burns Red's cover of "Carol of the Bells" was featured in the episode. Series regulars Matt McKenna and Erik Durbin provided the voice of Santa Claus and the moonshiner Bob Todd, respectively, while guest star Clancy Brown provided the voice of the liquor store manager.

== Cultural references ==
The episode contains several pop culture references. The title of the episode "For Whom the Sleigh Bell Tolls" is a parody of the novel, For Whom the Bell Tolls and the Metallica song inspired by the novel. The action sequence and bloody themes were slightly modeled after the film 300. When Bob Todd is teaching Roger moonshining, Roger jumps over barrels of moonshine, similar to the Donkey Kong video games. Frosty the Snowman appears in Santa's army, which is a reference to the cave-troll scene in Moria from The Lord of the Rings: The Fellowship of the Ring. The elves are wrangling Frosty in with a collar and chains almost exactly like the scene from Fellowship. When Jeff confronts Santa, he stabs him with the polar bear helmet from the film The Golden Compass. When Santa arrives and finds them the song 'Carol of the Bells' by August Burns Red plays. GH-7 Medical droids from Star Wars are seen facilitating Santa's recuperation in a recovery tank, similar to the scene of Luke Skywalker recovering in the film The Empire Strikes Back.

== Reception ==
"For Whom the Sleigh Bell Tolls" was broadcast on December 12, 2010, as a part of an animated television night on Fox, and was preceded by an hour-long Christmas episode of creator and executive producer Seth MacFarlane's other show, Family Guy. It was viewed by 6.26 million viewers, according to the Nielsen ratings. The episode was up 18% in total viewership from the last episode. It also acquired a 3.1 rating in the 18–49 demographic, up 24% from the previous episode.

"[...] between all the brutally bloody casualties, the politically incorrect names for Santa, the bestiality remarks about dead Rudolphs and Santa being stabbed by Jeff’s polar bear helmet from the movie The Golden Compass, this was one holiday episode that I was not expecting and I enjoyed every minute. Merry freakin’ Christmas!"

— Jessica Russell, TV Guide Canada

The episode was met with mixed reviews from critics. In a simultaneous review of the episodes of The Simpsons and Family Guy that preceded the show, Emily VanDerWerff of The A.V. Club wrote, "American Dad always thrives at this time of year, since it plays perfectly into Stan's idea of patriotism and Americana as a kind of religion, but the too-lengthy action sequence killed any humorous momentum the episode had built up." She ultimately gave the episode a B rating, the second best of the night, behind the Family Guy episode "Road to the North Pole" and beating The Simpsons episode "Donnie Fatso". Jessica Russell of TV Guide Canada wrote that she was "already sick of holiday-themed episodes" due to their "feel-good, warm-and-fuzzy, family-oriented storylines." However, she praised the episode for being "anti-Christmas", saying, "that’s why I give props to Seth MacFarlane and his crude minions for pulling off the ultimate anti-Christmas episode in last night’s American Dad." In response to writer Durbin's goal to make it as "bloody and cool as 300", Scott D. Pierce of The Salt Lake Tribune wrote that it was "bloody", but not "cool". He called the episode "just derivative trash", and compared the episode's themes to the film Bad Santa and the evil Robot Santa from Futurama. He concluded, saying, "as usual, "American Dad’s" Seth MacFarlane and his minions have done uninspired, unoriginal work that somehow mistakes crude for funny." Jason Hughes of TV Squad was positive on the episode, and concluded saying, "[...] Santa will be back next year to try and finish the job. I wonder if MacFarlane will remember that little detail and give us a sequel?"
