= The Cleveland Show season 2 =

The Cleveland Show
- Season 2
- DVD cover
- No. of episodes: 22

Release
- Original network: Fox
- Original release: September 26, 2010 – May 15, 2011

Season chronology
- ← Previous; Season 1 Next → Season 3

The second season of The Cleveland Show aired from September 26, 2010, to May 15, 2011. Fox ordered a second production series of 22 episodes (2APSxx) in October 2009.

== Cast ==
This season included the return of Kanye West for an additional episode after he appeared in the first season episode "Brotherly Love". The article has The Cleveland Show co-creator Rich Appel stating he hopes there is even more to come and then goes on to say: "He could not have been more collaborative or easier to work with. We're excited because his character has become a recurring character in our universe… He'll become our Sideshow Bob!".

- Mike Henry as Cleveland Brown, Rallo Tubbs, Oliver Wilkerson, Dwayne Meighan, and Coach McFall
- Sanaa Lathan as Donna Tubbs
- Kevin Michael Richardson as Cleveland Brown Jr. and Lester Krinklesac (voices).
- Reagan Gomez Preston as Roberta Tubbs
- Jason Sudeikis as Holt Ritcher and Terry Kimple (voices).
- Seth MacFarlane as Tim the Bear
- Aseem Batra as Kendra Krinklesac
- Jamie Kennedy as Federline Jones
- Alec Sulkin as Angus
- Al Thompson as Walt
- John Viener as Gordy
- Kanye West as Kenny West
- Nikki Bryer as Various voices.
- Corey Holcomb as Robert Tubbs
- Arianna Huffington as Arianna the Bear
- Alex Borstein as Haddassah Lowenstein
- Glenn Howerton as Ernie Krinklesac
- David Lynch as Gus
- Julius Sharpe as Derek
- Nat Faxon as Raymond the Bear
- Will Forte as Principal Wally Farquah
- Bruce McGill as Lloyd Waterman
- Carl Reiner as Murray
- Craig Robinson as LeVar Brown
- Frances Callier as Evelyn Cookie Brown
- T-Pain as Theodore Parker Jr. III
- Justin Timberlake as Paul
- Will.i.am as Bernard Bernard

== Episode list ==
No. overall	No. in season	Title	Directed by	Written by	Original release date	Prod. code	U.S. viewers (millions)
22	1	"Harder, Better, Faster, Browner"	Ian Graham	Matt Murray	September 26, 2010	2APS06	6.61
Cleveland attempts to get Kenny West's rap career off the ground and President Barack Hussein Obama visits Stoolbend.
23	2	"Cleveland Live!"	Ken Wong	Jonathan Green & Gabe Miller	October 3, 2010	2APS01	6.70
In an animation first, The Cleveland Show offers the audience a behind-the-scenes look at the "filming" of the episode. When Cleveland and Donna attempt to celebrate their anniversary, their unruly kids and disruptive friends, including Donna's ex-husband, Robert, get in their way.
24	3	"How Cleveland Got His Groove Back"	Oreste Canestrelli	Julius Sharpe	October 10, 2010	2APS05	5.63
Instead of continuing on their family-heritage trip to Africa, Cleveland and the family end up turning their layover into a tropical vacation.
25	4	"It's the Great Pancake, Cleveland Brown"	Ron Rubio	Aseem Batra	November 7, 2010	2APS04	6.68
Cleveland crushes Cleveland Jr.'s spirit when he forbids him from trick-or-treating because he thinks he is too old. Junior reinvents himself as a "cool kid" and is invited to attend a Halloween party with Roberta. Meanwhile, Rallo goes against his mom's wishes and eats way more Halloween candy than his teeth can handle.
26	5	"Little Man on Campus"	Anthony Agrusa	Kevin Biggins & Travis Bowe	November 14, 2010	2APS03	6.66
Coach Cleveland gets greedy to win the high school baseball state championship game and turns to cheat when his star pitcher goes out for the season.
27	6	"Fat and Wet"	Matt Engstrom	Kirker Butler	November 21, 2010	2APS02	5.07
Cleveland Jr. and Kendra, ashamed of their appearance in a swimsuit, feel left out of the fun when the family spends an afternoon in the pool and petition to pass a bill to grant equal rights for those who are overweight. Disgruntled by their defeat in the polls, Junior and Kendra flee to Wisconsin, a land where they feel freer and accepted, and Cleveland and Lester vow to bring them back to where they belong.
28	7	"Another Bad Thanksgiving"	Mike L. Mayfield	Clarence Livingston	November 28, 2010	2APS08	7.39
When Donna's sister Janet and her unruly children come to town to celebrate Thanksgiving with the Browns, Janet ends up falling in love with Holt, and both run off to Las Vegas to get married. However, when Donna finds out Janet has left them with her boys, she insist that the Browns go to Vegas to confront Janet, which leads into all of them spending Thanksgiving there.
29	8	"Murray Christmas"	Ken Wong	Kirker Butler	December 5, 2010	2APS09	6.97
When Rallo's teacher forces him to spend the weekend at a retirement home to get to know the senior citizens during the holidays, he meets Murray, who teaches him about Hanukkah. In an attempt to rekindle Murray's holiday spirit, Rallo helps him escape, but when his new friend's health begins to suffer, Rallo has to bring Murray back home. Meanwhile, Cleveland trains for a boxing match against his bully of a father, Freight Train, which ends with some bumps and bruises.
30	9	"Beer Walk!"	Jim Shellhorn	Aaron Lee	December 5, 2010	2APS07	5.96
Donna, frustrated by her husband's laziness on the weekends, nags Cleveland to help her around the house and to do something more with his life. To prove to Donna he can be as charitable as her, Cleveland recruits his buddies from Quahog and Stoolbend to participate in the First Annual Charity Beer Walk. When Donna gets injured at the event, Cleveland has to take over the housework.
31	10	"Ain't Nothin' But Mutton Bustin'"	Matt Engstrom	Courtney Lilly	January 9, 2011	2APS10	7.39
At Donna's suggestion, Cleveland and Rallo start spending more time together; Cleveland Jr. becomes jealous of Rallo and Cleveland's new relationship.
32	11	"How Do You Solve a Problem Like Roberta?"	Anthony Agrusa	Aaron Lee	January 16, 2011	2APS12	5.52
After Cleveland criticizes her parenting skills, Donna lets him deal with Roberta by himself; Cleveland lets Roberta throw a house party.
33	12	"Like a Boss"	Ron Rubio	Matt Murray	January 23, 2011	2APS11	5.19
Tim lets a promotion go to his head; Rallo uses a turtle to mess with Cleveland Jr.
34	13	"A Short Story and a Tall Tale"	Ian Graham	Julius Sharpe	February 13, 2011	2APS14	4.75
Cleveland and Donna celebrate Valentine's Day with a trip to Los Angeles after scoring courtside seats to the all-star basketball game featuring Kevin Garnett, Dwight Howard, LeBron James, Steve Nash, Dirk Nowitzki, Shaquille O'Neal and Dwyane Wade. Caught up in the excitement, Cleveland gets rowdy and talks smack to the players from the sideline throughout the game. The basketball champs, feeling hurt, seek revenge by paying a surprise visit to Stoolbend and putting Cleveland in his place.
35	14	"Terry Unmarried"	Ken Wong	Aaron Lee	February 20, 2011	2APS17	5.43
When Cleveland discovers he and his wife are not actually married, and his best friend Terry is gay and in a relationship, they all decide to go to Vermont for a double wedding; Cleveland Jr. tries to get Rallo to break a nasty habit.
36	15	"The Blue, The Gray, and The Brown"	Oreste Canestrelli	Jonathan Green & Gabe Miller	March 6, 2011	2APS13	4.80
After Cleveland fights to save the town's drive-in movie theater, his efforts to preserve the town's history are noticed by the Stoolbend Preservation Society and he is invited to attend a private dinner party at the home of the great-great-grandson of the town's founding father. While at the event, Cleveland learns of the town's legacy and decides to take back his beloved town.
37	16	"The Way the Cookie Crumbles"	Jim Shellhorn	Chadd Gindin	March 13, 2011	2APS15	4.64
After Cleveland learns that his parents have been scammed out of their life savings, he plans to bring down the con man who targeted his mother.
38	17	"To Live and Die in VA"	Seung-Woo Cha	Mehar Sethi	March 20, 2011	2APS16	5.45
Lester and Kendra lose everything because of Cleveland.
39	18	"The Essence of Cleveland"	Matt Engstrom	Jonathan Green & Gabe Miller	April 3, 2011	2APS18	4.81
Cleveland is reunited with an old classmate "Fatty Patty", who is now skinny and beautiful and still has a crush on Cleveland.
40	19	"Ship'rect"	Ken Wong	Teri Schaffer & Raynelle Swilling	April 10, 2011	1APS15	4.93
Cleveland and his friends decide to enter the Stoolbend Floaterboat Race, but Cleveland later ditches them for another team. Meanwhile, Rallo becomes too sick to go to school.
41	20	"Back to Cool"	Anthony Agrusa	Kevin Biggins & Travis Bowe	April 17, 2011	2APS19	4.61
When Cleveland Jr. bonds with Donna's ex-husband, Robert, Cleveland becomes jealous that Jr. thinks Robert is so much cooler than him. In order to prove how cool he is to his son, Cleveland challenges Robert to a "Coolympics" competition.
42	21	"Your Show of Shows"	Oreste Canestrelli	Story by : Carl Reiner; Teleplay by : Aseem Batra & Matt Murray	May 8, 2011	2APS21	4.70
When Rallo and his pals Bernard and Theodore perform in the school talent show, their rap about fiscal responsibility is not well-received by their classmates. Meanwhile, after Cleveland gets his own cable-access television show, the reviews are less than positive so he takes some tips from the most successful daytime talk shows that appeal to women. Note: This episode was dedicated to Page Wilson.
43	22	"Hot Cocoa Bang Bang"	Ian Graham	Kirker Butler	May 15, 2011	2APS22	4.90
Cleveland takes the entire family to San Diego Comic-Con in an attempt to sell his comic book Waderman. While there, Donna is horrified to find out that Robert Rodriguez is screening a Blaxploitation film that she starred in when she was younger, and Cleveland Jr., tired of Comic-Con being a playground for Hollywood to peddle their projects, gathers a band of geeks together to take the Con back to its true origins.

== Reception ==
Unlike the first season, this season received a more positive reception, in comparison to the first season. The Rotten Tomatoes score is a 63%, a 19% improvement over the previous season.

== Home media ==
The DVD was released as a "Complete Season" featuring all of the aired episodes. It was released in Region 1 on September 27, 2011 and was released in Region 2 on January 30, 2012.

The Complete Season Two
Set Details		Special Features
22 episodes; 4-disc set; Widescreen: 1.78:1 ratio video; Languages: English (w/ subtitles); Spanish subtitles; French subtitles		Audio Commentary; Deleted Scenes; Featurette: "Cleveland Jr.'s Worry Journal"; Featurette: "Guest Star Showcase"; Featurette: "Hot Cocoa Bang Bang Trailer"; Featurette: "Cleveland at Comic Con"
Release Dates		Audio Commentary; Deleted Scenes; Featurette: "Cleveland Jr.'s Worry Journal"; Featurette: "Guest Star Showcase"; Featurette: "Hot Cocoa Bang Bang Trailer"; Featurette: "Cleveland at Comic Con"
Region 1	Region 2	Audio Commentary; Deleted Scenes; Featurette: "Cleveland Jr.'s Worry Journal"; Featurette: "Guest Star Showcase"; Featurette: "Hot Cocoa Bang Bang Trailer"; Featurette: "Cleveland at Comic Con"
September 27, 2011	January 30, 2012	Audio Commentary; Deleted Scenes; Featurette: "Cleveland Jr.'s Worry Journal"; Featurette: "Guest Star Showcase"; Featurette: "Hot Cocoa Bang Bang Trailer"; Featurette: "Cleveland at Comic Con"
