= American Dad! season 20 =

American Dad!
- Season 20
- Promotional poster for the 20th season featuring Stan
- Starring: Seth MacFarlane; Wendy Schaal; Scott Grimes; Rachael MacFarlane; Dee Bradley Baker; Jeff Fischer
- No. of episodes: 22

Release
- Original network: TBS
- Original release: March 27 – December 18, 2023

Season chronology
- ← Previous; Season 19 Next → Season 21

The twentieth season of the American TV series American Dad! originally aired on TBS from March 27, 2023 to December 18, 2023, and consisted of 22 episodes. The season featured guest appearances from Pete Davidson, Anjelica Huston, Jason Alexander, Jaleel White, Chris Sullivan, Ann Dowd, Amy Sedaris, Alan Tudyk, Alyson Hannigan, and Simon Helberg. The series focuses on the eccentric upper middle class Smith family in a fictionalized version of Langley, Virginia and their eight housemates: Father, husband, CIA agent, and Republican, Stan; his wife and housewife, Francine; their liberal, hippie, college-aged daughter, Hayley-Fischer; their dorky high-school-aged son, Steve; the family's unusual goldfish, Klaus; flamboyant, master of disguise alien, Roger; Jeff Fischer, Hayley Smith's stoner husband who resides with the Smith family; And Roger's ex-tumor son Rogu. The season included the series' 350th episode. The season went on hiatus on May 29, 2023 after the airing of the 9th episode, and returned on Labor Day on September 4, 2023 with the 10th episode of the season.

== Production ==
On December 16, 2021, TBS renewed American Dad! for seasons 20 and 21, following the end of the show's eighteenth season. On May 12, 2023, it was announced that the showrunners of American Dad!, including Seth MacFarlane, would temporarily leave the show as a result of the ongoing Writers Guild of America strike. While this decision will not have an immediate effect on the show, it could impact future episodes if the strike is prolonged.

=== Marketing ===
The twentieth season was promoted with a contest titled "The Next Roger" by the show's official Twitter account and the TBS website. Users would need to tweet their persona ideas, and the winner would have their idea featured in the series' twenty-first season.

=== Release ===
The series' twentieth season was announced on March 6, 2023, with a special trailer with the tagline "18 Seasons, and Still Proud", showcasing moments from the upcoming season. The season premiered on March 27, 2023 with episodes coming to Hulu later in the year.

== Episodes ==
No. overall	No. in season	Title	Directed by	Written by	Original release date	Prod. code	U.S. viewers (millions)
345	1	"Fellow Traveler"	Joe Daniello	Brett Cawley & Robert Maitia	March 27, 2023	HAJN02	0.47
In the 20th season premiere, Roger's origin story is told, taking place in 1947 setting up the Roswell Incident, revealing Roger's passion for personas and how Avery Bullock's father (Avery Bullock Senior) was on the search for the alien way before him. Guest Stars: Paget Brewster, Jon Daly, Ann Dowd, Jake Getman, Anthony Mendez, Toks Olagundoye, Khary Payton, Amy Sedaris, Patrick Stewart, Fred Tatasciore
346	2	"The Professor and the Coach"	Jansen Yee	Joe Chandler	April 3, 2023	HAJN01	0.35
Roger's new professor persona teaches at Hayley's college, and asks Hayley to help him write a book about his experiences. Meanwhile, Jeff writes a rap to stop the Bazooka Sharks from leaving Langley Falls. Guest Stars: Anne Gregory, Leonard Robinson, Eddie Kaye Thomas
347	3	"Viced Principal"	Jennifer Graves	Parker Deay	April 10, 2023	HAJN03	0.40
Steve and Principal Lewis try to escape Pearl Bailey High School from three convicts who're connected to the school. Meanwhile, the Smiths befriend a baby giraffe that has escaped a zoo. Guest Stars: Curtis Armstrong, Pete Davidson, Matthew Gudernatch, Anjelica Huston, Ally Maki, Kevin Michael Richardson, Andre Sogliuzzo, Chris Sullivan, Daisuke Suzuki, Eddie Kaye Thomas
348	4	"The Pleasanting at Smith House"	Tim Parsons	Joel Hurwitz	April 17, 2023	HAJN04	0.40
Klaus buys a comb from an estate sale that harbors a wraith whose presence threatens Klaus' friendship with Jeff. Meanwhile, Stan gets his jaw wired shut after getting punched in the face. Guest Stars: Richard Kind, Kevin Michael Richardson, Amir Talai, Courtenay Taylor, Alanna Ubach
349	5	"Stretched Thin"	Chris Bennett	Sam Brenner	May 1, 2023	HAJN05	0.39
Fed up with the rest of the family criticizing his decision-making, Jeff decides to prove them wrong by becoming a legging salesman. Guest Stars: Kimberly Brooks, Ann Dowd, Patti Harrison, Richard Kind, Jane Lynch, Wendi McLendon-Covey, Jay Pharoah, Ignacio Serricchio, Travis Willingham
350	6	"Better on Paper"	Joe Daniello	Alisha Ketry	May 8, 2023	HAJN10	0.38
In the 350th episode, Stan discovers some old love poems in Francine's closet that come from his workplace. It turns out to be a printer powered by the romantic lobe from his brain, which he decides to take home, but things soon get out of hand when it gains sentience. Guest Stars: Mike Henry, David Koechner, Thomas Lennon, Rory O'Malley, Patrick Stewart, Alan Tudyk
351	7	"Cow I Met Your Moo-ther"	John O'Day	Zack Rosenblatt	May 15, 2023	HAJN08	0.34
Hayley tries to rid herself of her inner voice with help from Dr. Penguin (Roger's therapist persona) after it ruins her girls' night, but her attempts only make the voice's presence even larger. Guest Stars: Jason Alexander, Rachel Dratch, Alyson Hannigan, Natasha Leggero, Tia Mowry, Jaleel White, Ariel Winter
352	8	"Stan Fixes a Shingle"	Josue Cervantes	Tim Saccardo	May 22, 2023	HAJN06	0.33
Francine insists on helping Steve with his class project, while Stan finally gets around to fixing the broken shingle on the house's roof. Meanwhile, the other Smiths head out to return Gallagher's mallet. Guest Stars: Taliesin Jaffe, Richard Kind, Natalie Palamides, Kevin Michael Richardson, Eddie Kaye Thomas, Robert Wuhl
353	9	"Saving Face"	Jennifer Graves	Charles Suozzi	May 29, 2023	HAJN11	0.29
Stan is swayed to get some work done to maintain his "peak," but it turns out to be a trap by an old rival he didn't know he had. Meanwhile, Roger goes on a wild goose chase in pursuit of an apple he bought at the farmer's market. Guest Stars: Chris Diamantopoulos, Rachel Dratch, Josh Fadem, Simon Helberg, David Herman, Richard Kind, Thomas Lennon, Anthony Mendez June Diane Raphael, Bashir Salahuddin, Casey Wilson
354	10	"Frantastic Voyage"	Tim Parsons	Soren Bowie	September 4, 2023	HAJN12	0.33
When Stan goes too far to keep his work friend away from Francine, she is forced to save her new friend by going inside Stan's body. Meanwhile, Jeff and Hayley live the good life after finding a Lamborghini tire. Guest Stars: Paget Brewster, Eliza Coupe, Mike Henry, David Koechner, Phill Lewis, Jay Pharoah, Josh Robert Thompson, Andre Sogliuzzo, Patrick Stewart, Debra Wilson
355	11	"A Little Mystery"	Chris Bennett	Laura Beason	September 11, 2023	HAJN13	0.32
Hayley makes Jeff get a friend to add some mystery to their relationship but gets more mystery than she bargained for when she discovers that Jeff's new friend may be a serial killer. Guest Stars: Andy Daly, David Herman, Breckin Meyer, Daran Norris, Kevin Michael Richardson, Bashir Salahuddin, Amir Talai, Nick Thurston, Alanna Ubach
356	12	"Don't You Be My Neighbor"	Josue Cervantes	Paul Stroud	September 18, 2023	HAJN14	0.26
When the Smiths get new next-door neighbors, Francine hits it off with the wife of the family, while the others plot to drive them away. Meanwhile, Roger's latest persona sees him acting as the kite of a neglected boy. Guest Stars: James Adomian, Jake Getman, Richard Kind, Luke Lowe, Jane Lynch, Andy Richter, Allison Tolman, Kari Wahlgren, Gary Anthony Williams
357	13	"Productive Panic"	Shawn Murray	Nicole Shabtai	September 25, 2023	HAJN15	0.34
Francine quickly rises to fame after her homemade pottery is discovered by a famous art dealer, but when the fame becomes too much, Francine checks herself into a mental hospital. Guest Stars: Sarah Adina, Jon Daly, Paul W. Downs, Naomi Ekperigin, Reggie Lee, Lucy Lowe, Maggie Lowe, Kate Micucci, Toks Olagundoye, Chris Parnell, June Diane Raphael, Andy Richter, Matt Rogers, David Shabtai, Eddie Kaye Thomas, Casey Wilson
358	14	"Multiverse of American Dadness"	John O'Day	Curtis Cook	October 2, 2023	HAJN16	0.29
Hayley tries to find Steve so they can go to a Shaggy concert, but the endeavor takes her and Steve on a multiversal adventure. Guest Stars: Curtis Armstrong, Brandon Black, Keith David, Kevin Michael Richardson, Shaggy, Eddie Kaye Thomas, Gary Anthony Williams
359	15	"Z.O.I.N.C.S."	Shawn Murray	Jeff Kauffmann	October 30, 2023	HAJN07	0.28
Stan ends up missing and Francine, Jeff, Steve, Klaus and Hayley (dressed as Daphne, Shaggy, Velma, Scooby, and Fred, respectively, from Scooby-Doo) try to find where he's gone. Guest Stars: Rene Gube, Mike Henry, Phil LaMarr, Patrick Stewart
360	16	"A New Era for the Smith House"	Jansen Yee	Yolanda Carney	November 6, 2023	HAJN17	0.34
Roger seeks out a mythical giant whom he believes is responsible for the windy weather, borrowing a CIA yacht to investigate and bringing the family along for a makeshift vacation. Unable to trust Klaus to housesit while they're away, the Smiths hire Dick to keep an eye on him, unaware that he is plotting to squat in their home forever. Guest Stars: Dash Boam, Mike Henry, Richard Kind, David Koechner, Kevin Michael Richardson, Patrick Stewart, Travis Willingham
361	17	"Between a Ring and a Hardass"	Joe Daniello	Kevin Tyler	November 13, 2023	HAJN18	0.36
When the Smiths' dysfunctional antics are reported to Social Services, the family must clean up their act for one evening to impress the social worker, but various complications get in the way. Guest Stars: Curtis Armstrong, Chris Cox, Deanne Jacobs, Kyle McCarley, Kevin Michael Richardson, Eddie Kaye Thomas, Josh Robert Thompson
362	18	"Footprints"	Jennifer Graves	Joe Chandler	November 20, 2023	HAJN19	0.34
Stan and Roger feel that they haven't made an impact on the world and plan to rectify this by pitching a new TV show and revealing Roger's secret. Meanwhile, picking up from where the B-plot of "Mean Francine" left off, Jeff tries to find a new hat after losing his usual one. Guest Stars: Diedrich Bader, SungWon Cho, Andy Daly, Matthew Patrick Davis, Jermaine Fowler, Cullen McCarthy, June Diane Raphael, Alanna Ubach, Casey Wilson
363	19	"Steve, Snot, and the Quest for the OG Four Loko"	Tim Parsons	Nic Wegener	November 27, 2023	HAJN20	0.31
In order to get into a cool kid's party, Steve and Snot hunt down a rare keg of Four Loko beer, but their usage of Roger's disguises to appear as adults adds further complications to their quest. Guest Stars: Yoshi Ando, Curtis Armstrong, Tommy Blacha, John Cho, David Herman, David Hoffman, Natalie Palamides, Kevin Michael Richardson, Bashir Salahuddin, Daisuke Suzuki, Eddie Kaye Thomas, Josh Robert Thompson, Taylor Tomlinson, Alan Tudyk, Michael Urie
364	20	"The Pink Sphinx Holds Her Hearts on the Turn"	Chris Bennett	Brett Cawley & Robert Maitia	December 4, 2023	HAJN21	0.32
When Francine laments the fact that she can't hide her thoughts well, Roger tries to rectify this by training her in professional poker. Guest Stars: William Bibbiani, Simon Helberg, Cree Summer, Debra Wilson
365	21	"A Little Extra Scratch"	Josue Cervantes	Jeff Kauffmann	December 11, 2023	HAJN22	0.27
Jealous of the money she's making, Francine joins Hayley in selling pharmaceuticals harvested from armadillos. Meanwhile, Roger helps Stan perfect his sad face in order to avoid losing the house. Guest Stars: Chris Diamantopoulos, Mark McKinney, Breckin Meyer, Chris Parnell, Amir Talai, Jill Talley, Nick Thurston, Debra Wilson
366	22	"Into the Jingleverse"	Jansen Yee	Nic Wegener	December 18, 2023	HAJN09	0.20
After Steve outclasses him on Christmas with the presents he gifts the family, Stan goes to great lengths to reclaim his title as the "King of Presents." Guest Stars: Deandre Ayton, Michael Urie, Kari Wahlgren, Travis Willingham
