= American Dad! season 21 =

American Dad!
- Season 21
- Promotional poster for the 21st season featuring Roger.
- Starring: Seth MacFarlane; Wendy Schaal; Scott Grimes; Rachael MacFarlane; Dee Bradley Baker; Jeff Fischer
- No. of episodes: 22

Release
- Original network: TBS
- Original release: October 28, 2024 – March 24, 2025

Season chronology
- ← Previous; Season 20 Next → Season 22

The twenty-first season of American Dad! premiered on TBS on October 28, 2024, and ended on March 24, 2025. The season featured guest appearances from Kevin Bacon, Charles Barkley, Bret Hart, Gabriel Iglesias, Michael Imperioli, Leslie Jones, Neal McDonough, Joel McHale, and Kyra Sedgwick. The series focuses on the eccentric upper middle class Smith family in a fictionalized version of Langley, Virginia and their eight housemates: Father, husband, CIA agent, and Republican, Stan; his wife and housewife, Francine; their liberal, hippie, college-aged daughter, Hayley-Fischer; their dorky high-school-aged son, Steve; the family's unusual goldfish, Klaus; flamboyant, master of disguise alien, Roger; Jeff Fischer, Hayley Smith's stoner husband who resides with the Smith family; And Roger's ex-tumor son Rogu. Season 21 aired weekly without breaks throughout October 2024 to March 2025.

It was the tenth and final season to premiere on TBS, as it was announced that the series would return to its original network, Fox, on February 22, 2026.

It would also be the final season to use the opening sequence since Season 5, as a new opening sequence would debut the following season.

== Voice cast and characters ==
=== Regular ===
- Seth MacFarlane as Stan Smith, Roger Smith, Greg Corbin
- Wendy Schaal as Francine Smith
- Scott Grimes as Steve Smith
- Rachael MacFarlane as Hayley Smith
- Dee Bradley Baker as Klaus Heisler, Rogu
- Jeff Fischer as Jeff Fischer

=== Supporting characters ===
- Patrick Stewart as Avery Bullock
- Kevin Michael Richardson as Principal Brian Lewis
- Curtis Armstrong as Schmuley "Snot" Lonstein
- Daisuke Suzuki as Toshi Yoshida
- Eddie Kaye Thomas as Barry Robinson
- Rachel Dratch as Nerfer
- Nicole Shabtai as Danuta Tenuta
- Alan Tudyk as Dr. Kalgary
- Nicole Shabtai as Esther Lonstein

== Production ==
The episode "Guardian" was written originally as the series finale due to the series' cancellation from TBS, similarly to Season 8's "Hot Water" and Season 19's "Echoes".

On March 21, 2025, it was announced that this would be the final season to premiere on TBS. The series will continue to air reruns on the network alongside sister channels Adult Swim and TruTV until 2030. Beginning with season 22, the series will return to Fox for new episodes.

This season is Ron Hughart's last in his role of supervising director, which he had held from the first episode. Hughart retired from animation following the end of the season's production.

=== 20th anniversary ===
The series' 20th anniversary celebration began with the release of the soundtrack album "American Dad! Greatest Hits" and featured 19 original songs from the show's history including "Good Morning USA", "We're Red & We're Gay", "Girl, You Need a Shot (of B12)", "Ollie North", "Zooka Sharks Rap" and a remastered version of the song from the episode Hot Water, "Daddy's Gone". It was released on October 25, 2024 ahead of the 21st season premiere. Additionally, the episode "Get Him to the Greek Lifestyle" aired on the show's 20th anniversary.

== Episodes ==
No. overall	No. in season	Title	Directed by	Written by	Original release date	Prod. code	U.S. viewers (millions)
367	1	"The Grocery Store Bank"	Shawn Murray	Brett Cawley & Robert Maitia	October 28, 2024	JAJN01	0.23
Stan, Francine, and Roger come up with a seemingly perfect plan to rob a bank located inside a grocery store. They meticulously plan every detail, but ultimately decide not to go through with the heist. Their decision to abandon the plan leads to a peaceful resolution.
368	2	"Brown Lotus"	John O'Day	Nic Wegener	November 4, 2024	JAJN02	0.22
Hayley and Jeff decide to take a staycation at a nearby luxury resort where Jeff learns from Roger to be rude to the employees to secretly get Hayley what she wants. She eventually catches on and tries it herself but goes too far. Meanwhile, the CIA gets defunded and addresses its unpopularity by rebranding as a cake company.
369	3	"I've Got a Friend in Me"	Jansen Yee	Jeff Kauffmann	November 11, 2024	JAJN03	0.23
After a freak accident, Stan and Roger end up stuck together in the worst possible way. Meanwhile, Klaus has to deal with an impostor.
370	4	"Touch the Sun: A Chimborazo Adventure"	Joe Daniello	Zack Rosenblatt	November 18, 2024	JAJN04	0.26
The Smith family sets out to fulfill their dream of climbing Mount Everest. However, Stan, always looking to save money, opts for a cheaper alternative and takes them to Chimborazo, a volcano in Ecuador. The family quickly realizes that this mountain is far more challenging and dangerous than they anticipated, leading to a series of chaotic and humorous events.
371	5	"Under (and Over, and Beside) the Boardwalk"	Jennifer Graves	Parker Deay	November 25, 2024	JAJN05	0.27
The Smith family is excited about the grand reopening of the old Langley Falls boardwalk. However, what starts as a fun family outing quickly turns chaotic.
372	6	"The Violence of the Clams"	Tim Parsons	Tim Saccardo	December 2, 2024	JAJN06	0.30
Being the only one of his friends to not like a new fast-food restaurant drives Steve to madness. Meanwhile, Stan and Francine go on a quest to return mistakenly delivered mail.
373	7	"An Adult Woman"	Chris Bennett	Nicole Shabtai	December 9, 2024	JAJN07	0.24
After Hayley is deemed a "big child" by The Lady from The Hamster Rescue Society, she gets involved with two Roger personas who have a complicated family dynamic in an effort to prove that she is an adult woman.
374	8	"Piece by Piece"	Josue Cervantes	Alisha Ketry	December 16, 2024	JAJN08	0.23
Steve reveals his talent for playing the cello, which unlocks repressed childhood trauma in Roger's maestro persona, leading Roger to travel to Germany to confront his real father. Meanwhile, Francine and Hayley take up butchery as an outlet for her anger, and Jeff builds a luxury birdhouse.
375	9	"Nasty Christmas"	John O'Day	Joel Hurwitz	December 23, 2024	JAJN10	0.26
Disappointed by his boss's CIA Christmas party, Stan and Klaus crash Bullock's private Christmas party in which Santa Claus himself is a musical performer. Santa becomes jealous of Mrs. Claus when he sees Stan as her plus one, and leaves the gig to go live with the Smiths. Stan can't handle Mrs. Claus's drug-fueled lifestyle and escapes the North Pole. Santa realizes his mistake and rekindles his love with Mrs. Claus and resumes his role.
376	10	"Idiot Rich"	Shawn Murray	Andrew Rose	December 30, 2024	JAJN09	0.23
The Smiths want a Bugatti and realize Jeff's mooching is preventing them. Jeff gets a job in construction but instantly gets injured. A settlement lawyer cuts Jeff a big check. Jeff wants to invest the money in Hollywood, but in court Roger wins conservatorship over Jeff's money. Roger's scheme to take advantage of Jeff fails and the money is lost in Roger's bad casino investment scheme.
377	11	"Killer Mimosa"	Jansen Yee	Soren Bowie	January 6, 2025	JAJN11	0.32
Hayley gets an internship at a morning talk show. She suspects the talk show's guest of murdering his wife but the hosts are reluctant to let her break the story. Eventually they give in and unintentionally uncover the true culprit of the crime. Meanwhile back at home, the rest of the Smith family get food poisoning and count on Jeff to get them cured.
378	12	"The Legend of Mike Madonia, the Rototiller Man"	Joe Daniello	Paul Stroud	January 13, 2025	JAJN12	0.23
Francine joins the Langley Falls Garden Club, annoying her neighbor and longtime member Tuttle, who doesn't see her as a real gardener. Aided by Roger's rototiller persona, Francine enters a gardening competition, but accidentally unleashes chaos when her steroid fertilizer turns the earthworms into graboids. Meanwhile, the rest of the Smith family try the power of positivity by saying yes to everything.
379	13	"The Clearview Motel"	Jennifer Graves	Sam Brenner	January 20, 2025	JAJN13	0.23
Francine feels shut out by her family and drives to a friend's funeral in hopes of making a human connection. She leaves disappointed and meets Roger on the long drive home. The two stay at the Clearview Motel and realize they're being peeped at through the ceiling vents by an elderly man, who they accidentally frighten to death. They hide his body and, starved for human connection, can't stop themselves from likewise peeping on the other guests. After many days they've had enough but a curse over the motel prevents them from leaving.
380	14	"The Girl Who Cried Space Jam"	Tim Parsons	Curtis Cook	January 27, 2025	JAJN14	0.28
Hayley gets fired for being a poser and attends a Hippie boot camp to try get back to her roots, but fails and instead turns to devil worship. She manages to summon demons who challenge her to a Space Jam-style basketball game for Langley Falls' souls. The demons privately reveal they were just kidding, call Hayley a poser devil worshiper, and leave. Hayley decides to fake a demons-vs-public domain cartoon character basketball game anyway in hopes of winning back her reputation.
381	15	"Get Him to the Greek Lifestyle"	Chris Bennett	Kevin Tyler	February 3, 2025	JAJN15	0.26
The Smiths adopt the healthy Mediterranean diet and lifestyle so they can live longer, but Stan decides to take it ever further and with Roger's help uses biohacking to try to become immortal. His extreme health regiments take their toll on the rest of the Smith family and eventually backfire when an overdose leaves him with only 3 days to live. Stan hurries to do everything on his bucket list, but fails. At the last minute Roger saves the day with a medical solution.
382	16	"The Mystery of the Missing Bazooka Shark Babe"	Josue Cervantes	Yolanda Carney	February 10, 2025	JAJN16	0.26
When Hayley's cheerleader friend Danuta goes missing, Hayley goes undercover at the Bazooka Babes cheerleading squad (aided by Steve and Roger's crime-fighting personas Wheels and Legman) to solve the mystery of who her kidnapper is.
383	17	"Pork 'N Feelings"	Shawn Murray	Kate Spurgeon	February 17, 2025	JAJN17	0.31
Roger's intimacy coach persona helps Jeff become aware of his own dissatisfaction with his sex life with Hayley. After marriage counseling fails, Jeff seeks help from a mad scientist with a machine that lets people discover their sexual fantasies. Meanwhile at the CIA, Bullock learns about Marie Kondo's de-cluttering method and goes overboard with getting rid of things that don't spark joy.
384	18	"Oh Brothel, Where Art Thou?"	John O'Day	Jeff Kauffmann	February 24, 2025	JAJN18	0.32
Stan becomes envious when a neighbour's house is designated a historical landmark. Wanting his house listed with the town's historical society too, Stan succeeds when the family discovers the remains of a 19th century brothel in the basement, which draws tourists, but the tourists soon become more interested in the Smiths themselves. Meanwhile, Roger tries to make money as an encyclopedia salesman.
385	19	"The Sickness"	Jansen Yee	Zack Rosenblatt	March 3, 2025	JAJN21	0.25
While unboxing candles, Rogu mysteriously falls ill. The Smith family criticise Roger for being a neglectful parent, and fighting ensues. Despite the tension, the family works together to try to halt Rogu's rapidly worsening condition. The illness begins to spread to the rest of the family. Roger eventually discovers sarin gas in the candles' bubble wrap, and after getting fresh air the family feels better. However, Rogu remains ill, but Roger finally realizes how to heal him.
386	20	"Silicon Steve"	Joe Daniello	Nic Wegener	March 10, 2025	JAJN20	0.35
Steve starts a social media site exclusively for young people, but after adults take over his company, Steve tries to take his site down. Meanwhile, back at home, after the rest of the Smith family's cable TV goes down they seek out more highbrow forms of entertainment.
387	21	"Guardian"	Tim Parsons	Brian Boyle	March 17, 2025	JAJN22	0.32
While trying to help Steve with his math homework, Stan accidentally sets free Guardian – the CIA's secret AI – which goes rogue and attempts to destroy humanity with nuclear weapons. Meanwhile back at home, Roger learns what it's like to experience déjà vu.: Note: This was the final episode of the series to use the old revamped opening sequence since Season 5. A new opening sequence would begin being used in 'Aw Rats, A Pool Party'.
388	22	"What Great Advancements!"	Jennifer Graves	Brett Cawley & Robert Maitia	March 24, 2025	JAJN19	0.24
In a Charlie Chaplin homage episode, Stan is a modest inventor who leaves his farm for the city. He has no luck selling his inventions until he invents sound, which makes him rich and famous, but his competitors copy his invention. To spite them, he next invents color, but this time is determined to keep his invention to himself.
