= American Dad! season 17 =

American Dad!
- Season 17
- Promotional poster for the 17th season
- Starring: Seth MacFarlane; Wendy Schaal; Scott Grimes; Rachael MacFarlane; Dee Bradley Baker; Jeff Fischer
- No. of episodes: 24

Release
- Original network: TBS
- Original release: April 13 – December 21, 2020

Season chronology
- ← Previous; Season 16 Next → Season 18

The seventeenth season of the American TV series American Dad! originally aired on TBS from April 13, 2020, to December 21, 2020, and consisted of 24 episodes.

== Production ==
=== 15th Anniversary ===
Season 17 marked the series's 15th anniversary, and in celebration, TBS hosted a 15-episode marathon that ran from April 17, 2020 to April 24, 2020. Each episode handpicked by co-creator Matt Weitzman.

== Episodes ==
No. overall	No. in season	Title	Directed by	Written by	Original release date	Prod. code	U.S. viewers (millions)
277	1	"100 Years a Solid Fool"	Shawn Murray	Charles Suozzi	April 13, 2020	EAJN01	0.69
Stan drives the family to Little Colombia to get Steve's library card laminated. While there, Stan impresses the family with his knowledge of Colombia and tells the story of how, as a reckless rookie CIA agent, Stan was assigned to take down a drug lord (who turns out to be Roger) who kept tricking him.
278	2 (Note: Labeled by TBS as episode 21 of previous season)	"Downtown"	Chris Bennett	Nic Wegener & Joe Chandler	April 20, 2020	DAJN21	0.68
Hayley drives Steve to his PSATs, but her car breaks down next to a suburban house where perfume sellers murder people who fail to meet sales targets. Meanwhile, Stan, Francine, and Roger think Hayley and Steve went downtown and go to rescue them (because Stan thinks downtown is a scumhole), but end up getting distracted over how downtown has become a gentrified haven for millennial hipsters and forget about them.
279	3 (Note: Labeled by TBS as episode 22 of previous season)	"Cheek to Cheek: A Stripper's Story"	Josue Cervantes	Charles Suozzi	April 27, 2020	DAJN22	0.67
In this loose parody of Midnight Cowboy, Roger takes Jeff on the road to open up a chivalric male strip club, but Jeff takes to the world of raucous (and raunchy) male stripping to raise the money, while Klaus moves into Steve's room and causes trouble.
280	4	"A Starboy Is Born"	Chris Bennett	Joel Hurwitz & Abel "The Weeknd" Tesfaye	May 4, 2020	EAJN15	0.65
To teach Roger a lesson in obeying rules, Stan kidnaps Abel Tesfaye (better known as The Weeknd), who longs to live a mundane life away from the spotlight – and things get hairy when Roger takes The Weeknd's place as a star while The Weeknd becomes the family's newest house guest.
281	5	"Tapped Out"	Rodney Clouden	Nicole Shabtai	May 11, 2020	EAJN02	0.63
Steve finds out that Francine is still feeding him breast milk. Meanwhile, Roger becomes a documentary director, Stan gets his neck lengthened, and Jeff gets a chimpanzee face transplant.
282	6	"Brave N00b World"	Jansen Yee	Joel Hurwitz	May 18, 2020	EAJN03	0.60
Stan takes Steve to China to compete in e-sports against North Korea on an undercover mission to kill a North Korean general, while Francine, Roger, Jeff, and Hayley get stuck in a banister.
283	7	"Into the Woods"	Joe Daniello	Sam Brenner	May 25, 2020	EAJN04	0.66
When Stan bumps into an old friend in a sub shop, he tries to change his mundane life after wronging him in the past. Meanwhile, Roger prepares for an upcoming cold.
284	8	"One Fish, Two Fish"	Tim Parsons & Jennifer Graves	Tim Saccardo	June 1, 2020	EAJN06	0.64
Hayley tries to help Klaus get his citizenship by changing herself into a fish, but Klaus gets both of them deported to Mexico, while Stan, Francine, Steve, and Roger try to open a coconut that won't open.
285	9	"Exquisite Corpses"	Chris Bennett	Brett Cawley & Robert Maitia	June 8, 2020	EAJN07	0.63
In order to be taken seriously by others, Jeff, Francine, and Roger start a murder tour business.
286	10	"Trophy Wife, Trophy Life"	Shawn Murray	Sasha Stroman	June 15, 2020	EAJN10	0.60
When Stan gets injured by a satellite he begins to depend on Francine full time, while the other members of the family discover that Tuttle is a Korean reality show star.
287	11	"Game Night"	Rodney Clouden	Zack Rosenblatt	June 22, 2020	EAJN09	0.63
Stan has game night with his family, and the other Smiths decide to wreck his winning streak when they have game night in Deputy Director Bullock's underground labyrinth. Meanwhile, Roger adopts geese to make foie gras (since foie gras is too expensive and most places have banned it due to concerns over animal abuse), but ends up fattening himself up with the feed used to stuff the birds.
288	12	"American Data?"	Jansen Yee	Paul Stroud	June 29, 2020	EAJN11	0.68
Steve, Snot, Barry, and Toshi sign up for a paid scientific study to get calf implants after most of the money they saved up for it gets spent by Steve. Meanwhile, Stan is depressed over the CIA's janitor dying and uses the deceased janitor's leaf-blower to communicate.
289	13	"Salute Your Sllort"	Joe Daniello	Parker Deay	July 6, 2020	EAJN12	0.64
Steve's attempt to befriend a foreign exchange student backfires, while Stan and Francine accuse Klaus of being out of control and hire a pet whisperer to control him.
290	14	"Ghost Dad"	Pam Cooke	Soren Bowie	July 13, 2020	EAJN13	0.59
Stan struggles to cope with the untimely death of his father; a simple canoeing trip does catastrophic damage to Hayley and Jeff's relationship.
291	15	"Men II Boyz"	Tim Parsons & Jennifer Graves	Alisha Ketry	July 20, 2020	EAJN14	0.61
Klaus announces that he is going to marry Shoshanna (the Armenian woman who lived in Steve's room as seen on "Cheek to Cheek: A Stripper's Story") and invites Stan, Roger and Jeff to his bachelor party. Meanwhile, a male stripper and his son refuse to leave the Smith house.
292	16	"First, Do No Farm"	Josue Cervantes	Jeff Kauffmann	July 27, 2020	EAJN16	0.50
Worried that Hayley and the rest of the Smiths are getting too soft and dependent on creature comforts, Stan turns his house into a homestead, complete with farmland. Meanwhile, Klaus becomes a Scientologist.
293	17	"Roger Needs Dick"	Pam Cooke & Valerie Fletcher	Joe Chandler & Nic Wegener	August 3, 2020 (Note: This episode was first released on Video On Demand on June 2, 2020, the day after the episode was originally scheduled to air.)	EAJN05	0.64
One of Roger's personas falls in love with Dick and can't handle the subsequent breakup, creating havoc with his other personas.
294	18	"The Old Country"	Shawn Murray	Tim Saccardo	August 10, 2020	EAJN17	0.51
Steve pushes Stan to trace the Smith family's ancestry, while Hayley and Francine go under cover to take down bad workers at Sub Hubs across America.
295	19	"Businessly Brunette"	Rodney Clouden	Zack Rosenblatt	August 17, 2020	EAJN18	0.52
Hayley becomes a businesswoman, but Francine gets hired at the same office so she can bring her down. Meanwhile, Stan, Steve, Snot, Roger, Jeff, and Klaus plan a party.
296	20	"The Chilly Thrillies"	Jansen Yee	Laura Beason	August 24, 2020	EAJN19	0.61
Francine becomes hooked on Roger whispering to her. Meanwhile, Steve gets a rebar pole stuck in his head and mistakes a secret admirer letter he wrote to a girl for one a girl wrote to him.
297	21	"Dammmm, Stan!"	Joe Daniello	Parker Deay	August 31, 2020	EAJN20	0.48
Francine takes to fly-fishing, but Stan doesn't. Rather than admit that he's not good at it as she is, Stan dams the river and makes living the lake life as a new couple's activity. Meanwhile, Steve and Hayley solve the mystery of who Omar is when they find his height marks on the basement door.
298	22	"The Last Ride of the Dodge City Rambler"	Pam Cooke	Charles Suozzi	September 7, 2020	EAJN21	0.59
The Smiths take a trip on an old steam locomotive to visit Francine's aunt, only to discover it's being hijacked. Meanwhile, Hayley and Roger follow a strange passenger.
299	23	"300"	Tim Parsons & Jennifer Graves	Joe Chandler & Nic Wegener	September 14, 2020	EAJN22	0.57
In the milestone 300th episode, the Smiths kick Roger out of the house for ruining their chance to be on Family Feud, and the Golden Turd saga comes to its anticipated and long-awaited conclusion.
300	24	"Yule. Tide. Repeat."	Josue Cervantes	Jeff Kauffmann	December 21, 2020	EAJN08	0.55
Stan is given a magical opportunity to make his dream Christmas come true after it goes terribly wrong.
