= American Dad! season 13 =

American Dad!
- Season 13
- Region 1 cover art for "Volume 12"
- Starring: Seth MacFarlane; Wendy Schaal; Scott Grimes; Rachael MacFarlane; Dee Bradley Baker
- No. of episodes: 22

Release
- Original network: TBS
- Original release: January 25 – June 27, 2016

Season chronology
- ← Previous; Season 12 Next → Season 14

The thirteenth season of the American TV series American Dad! originally aired on TBS from January 25, 2016 to June 27, 2016, and consisted of 22 episodes.

On November 18, 2014, TBS renewed the series for a 22-episode thirteenth season. Additionally, in August 2015, TBS would announce that the network had ordered a fourteenth and fifteenth season, both consisting of 22 episodes.

Because of Mike Barker's departure from the show, his characters Terry Bates and John Sanders were written out of the series in "Anchorfran" (Terry left Greg so he can follow the band 311) and "Widow's Pique" (Sanders died on a body recovery mission), respectively. The season also included the two-hundredth episode, "The Two Hundred".

Guest stars for the season include James Adomian, Joe Buck, Sam Elliott, Bruce Greenwood, Lance Henriksen, Oliver Platt, Patton Oswalt, Flea, Tyrese Gibson, Eric André, Laird Hamilton, Paul Dooley, James Hetfield, Missy Elliott, Patricia Clarkson, Keegan-Michael Key, Jordan Peele, Jason Mantzoukas, Joan Cusack, John O'Hurley, Ashley Tisdale, George Takei, Naya Rivera, and Billy Bob Thornton.

== Episodes ==
No. overall	No. in season	Title	Directed by	Written by	Original release date	Prod. code	U.S. viewers (millions)
191	1	"Roots"	Shawn Murray	Brett Cawley & Robert Maitia	January 25, 2016	AAJN01	1.04
Stan is in favor of a new football stadium being built in Langley Falls, until he learns its construction will destroy a sacred tree from his childhood. Meanwhile, after Steve learns that he hasn't grown an inch in several years, he considers surgery to increase his height, and turns to a child physician named Dr. Calgary, whom Steve discovers is actually a mad surgeon from Germany.
192	2	"The Life Aquatic with Steve Smith"	Rodney Clouden	Kirk J. Rudell	February 1, 2016	AAJN02	0.95
Steve joins the water polo team, and finds that the only way he can become a star player is if Klaus hides in his Speedo. Meanwhile, Roger and Stan win a boat at a CIA auction and soon regret their purchase.
193	3	"Hayley Smith, Seal Team Six"	Jansen Yee	Teresa Hsiao	February 8, 2016	AAJN03	1.00
In an effort to bring back a long-lost sense of joy and innocence, Roger's persona Dr. Penguin hypnotizes Hayley into being six years old. Meanwhile, Steve and his friends buy a slow cooker off a shady, trenchcoated man and spend days trying to create the perfect pulled pork.
194	4	"N.S.A. (No Snoops Allowed)"	Joe Daniello	Steve Hely	February 15, 2016	AAJN04	1.07
Steve goes to work with Stan to help him troubleshoot his computer -- and ends up entangled with the NSA after Steve gets mad at Stan for mocking him. Meanwhile, Hayley goes on a meat-eating spree after eating Klaus' hazelnut omelette (which has veal in it).
195	5	"Stan Smith as Keanu Reeves as Stanny Utah in Point Breakers"	Pam Cooke & Valerie Fletcher	Joe Chandler & Nic Wegener	February 22, 2016	AAJN05	1.05
Stan finds himself stressed out on his day-off from work, due to Steve's new friendship with a murderous derelict, Hayley and Jeff's pregnancy scare, Francine's shoplifting, and Roger's attempts to get the World Cup to be held in the house. As Stan returns to work, Bullock believes that surfers may be the cause of a recent cyber attack after watching Point Break (the original 1990s version starring Keanu Reeves), and volunteers to go undercover as a surfer in order to relax and put his stress behind him.
196	6	"Kiss Kiss Cam Cam"	Chris Bennett	Jordan Blum & Parker Deay	February 29, 2016	AAJN07	1.03
Stan begins to question his marriage with Francine when they have a terrible "Kiss Cam" experience. Meanwhile, Steve and Roger travel to Carson City in order for Roger to re-elect his Senator persona on the Nevada legislature to fulfill his promise of keeping the city's water supply clean.
197	7	"The Devil Wears a Lapel Pin"	Josue Cervantes	Zack Rosenblatt	March 7, 2016	AAJN08	1.14
When Stan is chosen to put together the annual CIA pin-up calendar, he attempts to find an assistant. However, when he fires assistant after assistant, Hayley takes the assistant job in order to get revenge for ruining a picture she drew for him as a child. Meanwhile, Roger gets a Discovery Card on his first (and only) day of college, but finds that no one takes Discovery (except for a secret section of the local mall that hasn't been touched since the 1980s) and must fake his death when he can't pay the bill.
198	8	"Stan-Dan Deliver"	Shawn Murray	Rachael Bogert & Emily Wood	March 14, 2016	AAJN09	1.01
Steve is sentenced to attend a class for delinquents and ghetto teenagers after Roger eats the chocolates Steve was supposed to sell for charity. Meanwhile, Stan and Francine decide to shop for retirement homes, but when Stan decides to stay and gets hooked on the medications they give their patients, Francine, Hayley, and Jeff attempt to free him.
199	9	"Anchorfran"	Rodney Clouden	Jeff Kauffmann	March 21, 2016	AAJN11	0.96
Greg has been depressed over Terry leaving him to go on tour with the band 311, so Francine attempts to help Greg out by joining him on the newscast. However, her newfound fame on the set leads to Greg's suffering. Meanwhile, Hayley digs up her old "Dream Phone" game, leading Roger to grow an unhealthy obsession with a character.
200	10	"The Two Hundred"	Jansen Yee	Brett Cawley & Robert Maitia	March 28, 2016	AAJN10	1.08
A tattooed Stan, along with Roger and Greg, set out to find the other Smiths when an unidentified entity known as "The Two Hundred" has turned Langley Falls into an apocalyptic wasteland and all the citizens, led by Principal Lewis, turn into savages and cannibals.
201	11	"The Unincludeds"	Tim Parsons & Jennifer Graves	Ali Waller	April 11, 2016	AAJN06	1.05
Steve and Snot set out to throw a party for the unpopular students, but when the party they throw changes their futures, they are forced to make things right. Meanwhile, Roger is upset when a waiter compliments Hayley's order at a restaurant and not his.
202	12	"The Dentist's Wife"	Joe Daniello	Charles Suozzi	April 18, 2016	AAJN12	1.08
Roger finds himself in an identity crisis after he becomes interested in a local dentist's wife named Meredith Fields, a reference to Samantha Kingsbury. Meanwhile, Klaus tortures Stan, Steve, Hayley, and Jeff with a party with perverted guests when they become incredibly stiff and sore from a workout session with CrossFit.
203	13	"Widow's Pique"	Pam Cooke & Valerie Fletcher	Sam Brenner	April 25, 2016	AAJN13	1.05
When one of Stan's co-workers dies on assignment, Francine prepares herself for the possibility of becoming a widow should Stan die. Meanwhile, Steve and his friends put on a wrestling show, but Principal Lewis shows up to challenge them for a championship belt.
204	14	"The Nova Centauris-burgh Board of Tourism Presents: American Dad"	Tim Parsons & Jennifer Graves	Jordan Blum & Parker Deay	May 2, 2016	AAJN14	0.82
When Francine becomes upset that she can't do anything she wants to, she joins Steve in his live-action role playing game in the park. Meanwhile, Stan confiscates a shark aquarium from a drug lord and is convinced by Roger to open a SeaWorld knock-off called "Oceanland."
205	15	"Daesong Heavy Industries"	Chris Bennett	Greg Cohen	May 9, 2016	AAJN15	0.91
Part one of two. Stan's faith in God is shattered when he tries to teach Steve the Bible and Steve points out all the logical errors in the stories, leading Stan on a downward spiral of hedonism and self-destruction. Under Francine's orders, Steve restores Stan's faith when he discovers a Korean tanker the same measurements as Noah's Ark -- and things take a turn for the worse when Stan ropes the family into going to Korea to find the fabled tanker as he believes he's the next Noah.
206	16	"Daesong Heavy Industries II: Return to Innocence"	Josue Cervantes	Zack Rosenblatt	May 16, 2016	AAJN16	0.93
Conclusion. The Smiths (and Jeff, but not Klaus, who was thrown off the boat at the end of the previous episode) are still stuck on the Korean tanker, which blows up after Roger's "If They Could See Me Now"-style musical number. Now shipwrecked, Stan and Francine end up washed up on an island with no clothes and no memory of who they are and become a modern-day Adam and Eve, with an off-screen narrator directing them in their state, trying to get them to have sex. Meanwhile Jeff and Hayley are rescued by the U.S. Navy, and Steve is trapped on a lifeboat with a wolf and Roger's dangerous survival tips.
207	17	"Criss-Cross Applesauce: The Ballad of Billy Jesusworth"	Shawn Murray	Joe Chandler & Nic Wegener	May 23, 2016	AAJN17	0.95
When Stan wants to play a game of basketball with Roger, he ends up being rejected by him for being too old. But when Roger ends up getting a hairline fracture on his leg (despite many past episodes revealing that Roger has no bones in his body), Stan reluctantly invites him to join his basketball league in order to get revenge on him. Meanwhile, Steve recounts his day in a send-up of R. Kelly's Trapped in the Closet.
208	18	"Mine Struggle"	Rodney Clouden	Kirk J. Rudell	May 30, 2016	AAJN18	1.15
A power washer accident uncovers a salt deposit in the backyard, but while Stan and the rest of the family see a cash opportunity, Steve (the actual owner of the yard's mineral rights) refuses to go along with it out of nostalgia.
209	19	"Garfield and Friends"	Jansen Yee	Teresa Hsiao	June 6, 2016	AAJN19	0.87
When Stan drags Hayley to James A. Garfield's former house for a tour in celebration for Presidents' Day, Stan decides to bring President Garfield back to life to teach her about his life and history, only for Hayley to befriend Garfield and get him hooked on orange soda and Step Up movies. Meanwhile, Steve joins the school newspaper, and becomes famous for his sexually suggestive articles.
210	20	"Gift Me Liberty"	Joe Daniello	Charles Suozzi	June 13, 2016	AAJN20	1.02
Stan is forced to solve the mystery of who didn't bring a gift to the CIA's annual "Evil Santa" gift exchange. Meanwhile, Steve scores a date for the Harvest Dance after buying a handkerchief from a famed ladies' man, and ends up running a scam where he pretends to be the sexless good-boy date for teenage girls who date older men and sexy bad boys behind their parents' backs.
211	21	"Next of Pin"	Pam Cooke & Valerie Fletcher	Jeff Kauffmann	June 20, 2016	AAJN21	0.92
Stan sets out to find an activity that he can share with Steve, but gets left out when Steve shows great talent in bowling and becomes famous. Meanwhile, Hayley and Roger compete to see whose attention span is the worst by watching a Ken Burns documentary.
212	22	"Standard Deviation"	Tim Parsons & Jennifer Graves	Brian Boyle	June 27, 2016	AAJN22	0.98
Stan must defeat Deputy Director Bullock in a DJ battle in order to get out of a suicide mission. Meanwhile, Jeff begins drinking psychedelic teas and hallucinates a musical instrumental, leading Roger to help him find it as a prank.
