= American Dad! season 15 =

American Dad!
- Season 15
- Region 1 cover art for "Volume 14"
- Starring: Seth MacFarlane; Wendy Schaal; Scott Grimes; Rachael MacFarlane; Dee Bradley Baker
- No. of episodes: 22

Release
- Original network: TBS
- Original release: December 25, 2017 – April 8, 2019

Season chronology
- ← Previous; Season 14 Next → Season 16

The fifteenth season of the American TV series American Dad! began with a Christmas special, which aired on December 25, 2017 on TBS. The season aired from February 12, 2018, to April 8, 2019. The series went on hiatus after the season's thirteenth episode aired May 7, 2018. The remaining 9 episodes of the season began airing on February 11, 2019.

== Episodes ==
No. overall	No. in season	Title	Directed by	Written by	Original release date	Prod. code	U.S. viewers (millions)
235	1	"Santa, Schmanta"	Joe Daniello	Teresa Hsiao	December 25, 2017	CAJN08	0.86
In this loose sequel to "Ninety North, Zero West," Roger (upset that no one in the family will pay attention to him) befriends Snot (who's upset over not celebrating Christmas because of his religion) and converts to Judaism, then finds the corpse of Santa Claus and becomes Schmanta, a Santa Claus with the power to make Hanukkah more popular than Christmas.
236	2	"Paranoid Frandroid"	Pam Cooke & Valerie Fletcher	Joel Hurwitz	February 12, 2018	CAJN01	0.78
Francine becomes hooked on conspiracy theories after discovering that her favorite morning show, Morning Mimosa, is an elaborate CIA ploy conducted by Stan to keep her docile and ignorant of the real world. Meanwhile, Steve and Klaus help Snot and his mom move into an upper-class neighborhood after Snot's mom's boyfriend invites them over, but things get complicated when Snot's mother falls for Klaus.
237	3	"The Census of the Lambs"	Tim Parsons & Jennifer Graves	Sam Brenner	February 19, 2018	CAJN02	0.83
After Stan is chosen to be an enumerator for the Census, he ends up competing with Hayley over who can count the most residents...and gets abducted by a serial killer. Meanwhile, Klaus becomes a photographer after finding his uncle's old camera and chooses Steve's friend, Barry, to be his star model.: Spoof to Silence of the Lambs
238	4	"Shell Game"	Chris Bennett	Brett Cawley & Robert Maitia	February 26, 2018	CAJN03	0.73
Steve and Roger stumble upon a secret society of rare bird egg hoarders. Meanwhile, Francine shakes up dinner when she buys a zesty Italian spaghetti sauce that turns the family into Italian-American immigrants.
239	5	"The Mural of the Story"	Josue Cervantes	Jeff Kauffmann	March 5, 2018	CAJN04	0.99
Stan tries to renovate Langley Falls' historical mural, but when he does an amateur job on it, he lets his daughter, Hayley, take the blame for ruining it. Meanwhile, in a loose parody of Whiplash, Steve enrolls in a prestigious clown college with Roger as his tough-love instructor who pushes him to his limit.
240	6	"(You Gotta) Strike for Your Right"	Shawn Murray	Tim Saccardo	March 12, 2018	CAJN05	0.80
When Hayley (who has a job as a sandwich delivery girl) notices the bad working conditions at the CIA, she tries to motivate everyone to go on strike. Meanwhile, Steve, Roger, Klaus, and Francine watch the entire series of Breaking Bad backwards and find themselves on a treasure hunt set up by Breaking Bad creator, Vince Gilligan.
241	7	"Klaustastrophe.tv"	Rodney Clouden	Kirk J. Rudell	March 19, 2018	CAJN06	0.93
Klaus sets up a video website, chronicling the epic fails of the Smith family. Meanwhile, Stan once again has to come to terms with his dysfunctional childhood when he discovers a secret about his time at a Harlem Globetrotters-themed summer camp.
242	8	"Death by Dinner Party"	Jansen Yee	Joe Chandler & Nic Wegener	March 26, 2018	CAJN07	0.97
Francine's dinner party turns into a murder mystery when news hits of a man who kills people during dinner parties and a stranger dressed as a game hunter is invited.
243	9	"The Never-Ending Stories"	Pam Cooke & Valerie Fletcher	Parker Deay & Jordan Blum	April 9, 2018	CAJN09	0.92
In need of an outlet for his boring stories, Stan takes over as teacher for a fresh-faced batch of CIA operatives and teaches them all the stories he's wasted on his family. Meanwhile, Klaus becomes a hip-hop hype man after local rapper Juicy Lou (voiced by Xzibit) notices his talent during a street battle.
244	10	"Railroaded"	Tim Parsons & Jennifer Graves	Zack Rosenblatt	April 16, 2018	CAJN10	0.80
When the mayor of Langley Falls rejects Stan's suggestion for a bullet train, Stan runs for mayor himself...and Roger ends up making Stan his political puppet when Stan wins and has no idea how to run the town.
245	11	"My Purity Ball and Chain"	Chris Bennett	Charles Suozzi	April 23, 2018	CAJN11	0.87
Francine orders Stan to give Steve the sex talk, but Stan (who, despite being able to give Steve the sex talk in "A Smith in the Hand", is too afraid to do it in this episode because of his father traumatizing him as a child) decides to put him in a teen abstinence program where teenage girls pledge their virginity to their fathers. Meanwhile, Klaus, Jeff, Roger, and Hayley decide to build a water slide for the backyard pool after having fun at a real water slide near the lake, but when a guy named Kyle tries it out and ends up killed, the four must cover up the crime before Detective Turlington solves the case.
246	12	"OreTron Trail"	Josue Cervantes	Paul Stroud	April 30, 2018	CAJN12	0.83
When Steve introduces Roger to the original Macintosh version of the computer game The Oregon Trail, Roger freaks out over the fact that he will outlive the Smith family. After a stint as a motorcycle-riding rebel, Roger returns home and bribes Dr. Weitzman into drugging the family and uploads their consciousness on to Steve's refurbished Macintosh so they'll be with him forever. Meanwhile, Klaus turns Roger's bar into a neighborhood corner store and becomes paranoid over shoplifters coming in and stealing his merchandise.
247	13	"Mean Francine"	Shawn Murray	Nicole Shabtai	May 7, 2018	CAJN13	0.92
When Francine is chosen to be Pearl Bailey High's newest guidance counselor (after the old one fell in love with and ran off with a sophomore), she falls in with a trio of mean girls known as "The Golden Girls". Meanwhile, Jeff has a mental breakdown when his favorite hat goes missing.
248	14	"One-Woman Swole"	Rodney Clouden	Sasha Stroman	February 11, 2019	CAJN14	0.75
Sick of being made fun of for quitting all the hobbies she set out to do, Francine takes up bodybuilding -- and ends up in a coma after pulling off a dangerous move at a bodybuilders' beauty pageant. Meanwhile, Klaus tries to prove he invented the high-five after a famous athlete is cited as the original creator on an IFC documentary.
249	15	"Flavortown"	Jansen Yee	Greg Cohen	February 18, 2019	CAJN15	0.78
Stan pushes Jeff (who is worried that he has no identity outside of being a lazy, pot-smoking hippie) into becoming part of Guy Fieri's entourage. Meanwhile, Klaus and Roger are mistaken for valets.
250	16	"Persona Assistant"	Joe Daniello	Jeff Kauffmann	February 25, 2019	CAJN16	0.96
In the 250th episode, Stan takes over for Roger's personas when Roger is laid up with a brain tumor, and ends up causing a gang war when one of his personas fails to visit a rollerskate repair shop.
251	17	"The Legend of Old Ulysses"	Pam Cooke & Valerie Fletcher	Zack Rosenblatt	March 4, 2019	CAJN17	0.79
The Smiths go on a lake trip, where Stan and Steve square off against Snot and his new father figure, Tuttle. Meanwhile, Roger poses as a cycling group leader, Klaus gets swallowed by a legendary fish, and Hayley and Francine push the limit on how long they can sunbathe.
252	18	"Twinanigans"	Tim Parsons & Jennifer Graves	Jordan Blum & Parker Deay	March 11, 2019	CAJN18	0.77
While watching online videos, Steve, Roger, and Klaus stumble upon an old commercial for Pizza Overlord featuring Steve (with Roger as his stunt double), prompting Steve and Roger to restart their careers as twin actors, but Steve ends up the big star when it becomes apparent that Roger is a terrible actor. Meanwhile, the rest of the family become addicted to shopping at Spencer's Gifts after Stan gets run over by a driver and the driver gives him the store's credit card by mistake.
253	19	"Top of the Steve"	Chris Bennett	Joe Chandler & Nic Wegener	March 18, 2019	CAJN19	0.70
Tired of living under Stan's opprobrious authority, Steve and Roger run away from home and end up enrolled in an all-girls' school, where Steve's life begins to feel like a cheesy 1980s sitcom spin-off. Meanwhile, the Smiths have to put up with new characters (such as a vulnerable, yet spunky Punky Brewster-esque orphan and John Michael Heaton, Stan's previously-unknown, long-lost British cousin) living in their house as a replacement for Steve and Roger.
254	20	"Funnyish Games"	Josue Cervantes	Kirk J. Rudell	March 25, 2019	CAJN20	0.85
Stan creates a home security system after a neighborhood break-in has Francine nervous. Meanwhile, Steve takes a college course and tries Hayley's laid-back approach to studying.
255	21	"Fleabiscuit"	Shawn Murray	Teresa Hsiao	April 1, 2019	CAJN21	0.74
Jeff gets into dog-racing and leaves Hayley out in the cold...until she begins training Roger as a race dog. Meanwhile, Klaus gets into riding the mechanical rabbit and teasing the greyhounds at the track, Stan and Francine make themselves at home at the track after losing their money, and Steve takes advantage of being the only one in the house.
256	22	"The Future Is Borax"	Rodney Clouden	Brett Cawley & Robert Maitia	April 8, 2019	CAJN22	0.75
Stan and Francine go to a lovers' retreat after Barry (Steve's fat friend) sees their passive-aggressive sniping as a sign that their marriage has fallen on hard times. Meanwhile, Steve, Hayley, Klaus, and Roger enter a jingle-writing contest for Pizza Overlord.
