= American Dad! =

American animated sitcom

- Genre: Animated sitcom
- Created by: Seth MacFarlane; Mike Barker; Matt Weitzman
- Showrunners: Matt Weitzman; Mike Barker (seasons 1–10); Steve Callaghan (season 8); Brian Boyle (seasons 12 – 22)
- Voices of: Seth MacFarlane; Wendy Schaal; Scott Grimes; Rachael MacFarlane; Dee Bradley Baker; Jeff Fischer (starting in season 17)
- Theme music composer: Walter Murphy
- Opening theme: "Good Morning, USA" by Seth MacFarlane
- Ending theme: "Good Morning, USA" (instrumental)
- Composers: Walter Murphy; Joel McNeely; Ron Jones
- Country of origin: United States
- Original language: English
- No. of seasons: 22
- No. of episodes: 401 (list of episodes)

Production
- Executive producers: Seth MacFarlane; Mike Barker; Matt Weitzman; Brian Boyle; Kenny Schwartz; Rick Wiener; David Zuckerman; Richard Appel; Nahnatchka Khan; David A. Goodman; Erik Sommers; Steve Callaghan; Jordan Blum; Zachary Rosenblatt; Joe Chandler; Nic Wegener; Joel Kuwahara; Jeff Mednikow
- Producers: Kara Vallow; Diana Ritchey; Zac Moncrief; Michael Rowe; Brian LoSchiavo
- Editor: Rob DeSales
- Running time: 21–24 minutes
- Production companies: Underdog Productions; Fuzzy Door Productions; 20th Television (Note: Credited as 20th Century Fox Television through season 17) (seasons 1–18); 20th Television Animation (Note: Animation service through season 18; credited as Fox Television Animation through season 17) (season 19–present)

Original release
- Network: Fox
- Release: February 6, 2005 – September 21, 2014
- Network: TBS
- Release: October 20, 2014 – March 24, 2025
- Network: Fox
- Release: February 22, 2026 – present

American Dad! is an American animated sitcom created by Seth MacFarlane, Mike Barker and Matt Weitzman for Fox and TBS. The series premiered on February 6, 2005, following Super Bowl XXXIX, with the rest of the first season airing from May 1 of the same year. The show centers around the Smiths, a dysfunctional family consisting of parents Stan and Francine, their children, Hayley and Steve, as well as a goldfish named Klaus and an extraterrestrial named Roger. In the seventh season, Hayley's boyfriend (turned husband) Jeff Fischer joined the main cast, followed by Rogu, Roger's neoplastic son who joined in the fifteenth season. Unlike MacFarlane's other show, Family Guy, American Dad! does not lean as heavily on the use of cutaway gags, instead deriving its humor mostly from the quirky characters and their relationships.

The show was conceived by MacFarlane and Weitzman after the two were inspired by the 2000 United States presidential election, and Fox Broadcasting ordered a pilot presentation of the series in September 2003. American Dad! was the first series made specifically for Fox's Animation Domination block. The series moved to TBS for its twelfth season in 2014 until the conclusion of its twenty-first season in March 2025. It returned to Fox for its twenty-second season on February 22, 2026. In addition, the show has been renewed through its twenty-fifth season on the network.

American Dad! has received generally positive reviews and has been nominated for numerous awards, including four Primetime Emmy Awards and two Annie Awards. In June 2013, it was awarded as top television series by the American Society of Composers, Authors and Publishers.

== Premise ==
The Smith family. From left to right: Roger (alien), Francine, Stan, Klaus (fish in fishbowl), Hayley, Steve

The series focuses on the eccentric upper middle class Smith family in the fictional town of Langley Falls (deriving its name from the actual locale of Langley, Virginia, as well as the nearby town of Great Falls, Virginia), and their four housemates: father, husband, CIA agent, Republican, and breadwinner Stan; his wife and homemaker/housewife Francine; their liberal, hippie, college-aged daughter Hayley; and their dorky high-school-aged son Steve. There are four additional main characters, including Jeff Fischer, Hayley's dimwitted boyfriend and later husband; Klaus, the family's unusual goldfish who has the brain of an East German athlete; Roger, an alien who is a flamboyant, hedonistic, self-serving master of disguise; and Rogu, Roger's ex-tumor son. Stan's boss Avery Bullock, the Deputy Director of the Central Intelligence Agency, is a recurring character.

=== Main characters ===
American Dad! centers on the misadventures of its title character Stan Smith, his immediate family, and their four housemates. The show's main characters are listed as follows:

- Seth MacFarlane voices Stan Smith (husband/father and CIA agent) and Roger Smith (Alien whom Stan saved at Area 51, who wears costumes to disguise himself and create personas)
- Wendy Schaal voices Francine Smith (wife/mother)
- Scott Grimes voices Steve Smith (Stan and Francine's geeky, oversexed son)
- Rachael MacFarlane voices Hayley D. Smith-Fischer (Stan and Francine's rebellious teenage daughter)
- Dee Bradley Baker voices Klaus Heisler (the Smiths' pet fish that had the brain of a man implanted after the fictional 1986 Winter Olympics) and Rogu (Roger's ex-tumor son)
- Jeff Fischer voices the character of Jeff Fischer (Hayley's stoner boyfriend later turned husband)

== Production ==
=== Origins and comparison with Family Guy and All in the Family ===
Seth MacFarlane was inspired by the 2000 election for the show, noting: "me and co-creator Matt Weitzman were so frustrated with the Bush administration that we would just spend days bitching and complaining, and we figured we should channel this into something creative and hopefully profitable." In early February 2005, Barker stated, "About a year and a half ago, Seth called and asked if Matt and I would be interested in working on a show about a right-wing CIA agent and his liberal daughter. It was right up our alley, and everything just fell into place." On September 14, 2003, Variety reported that Fox Broadcasting had ordered a pilot presentation of the then tentatively titled American Dad! and "If greenlit, American Dad! could launch as early as fall 2004." At the time, Fox was aiming to develop a new lineup of adult animated sitcoms.

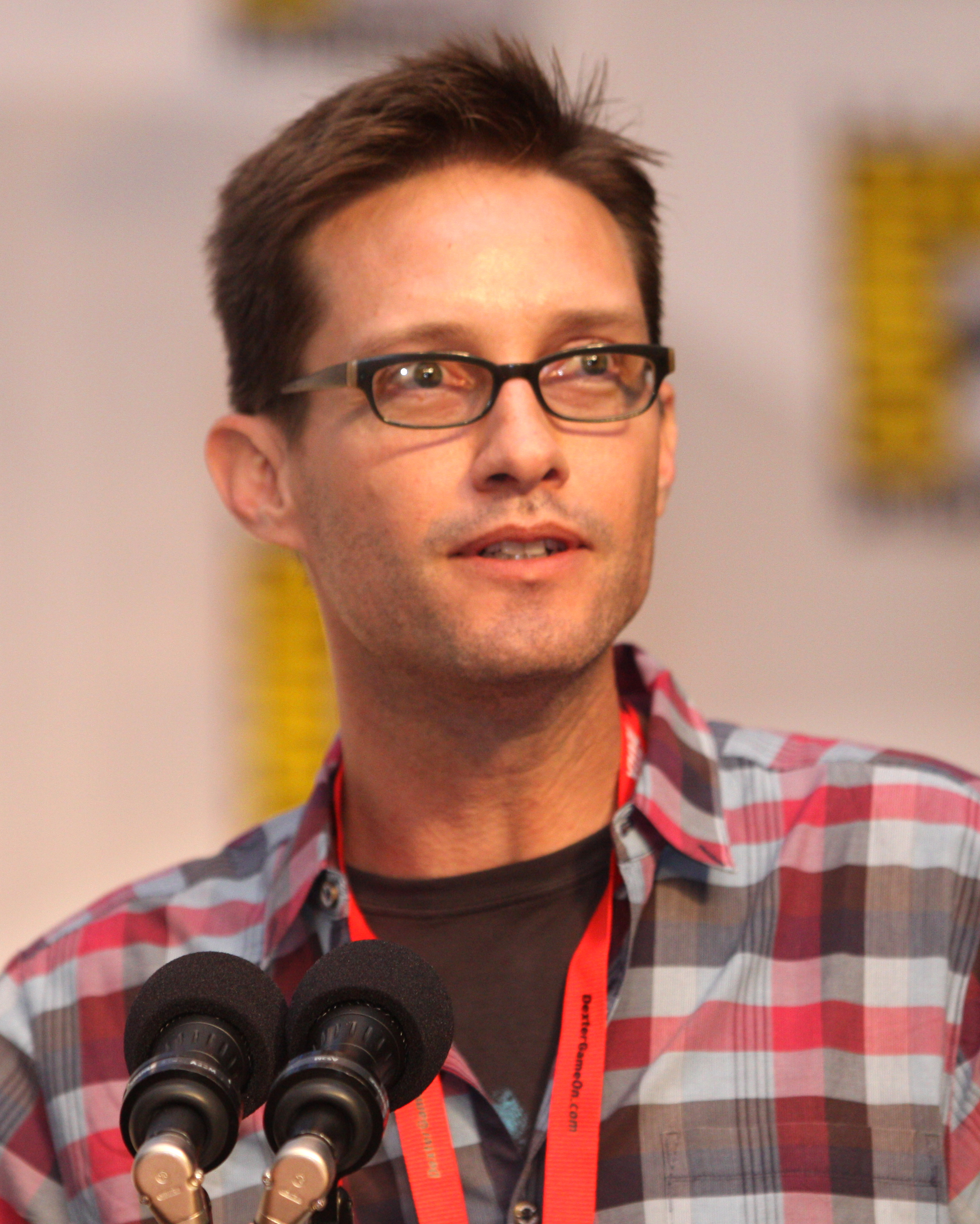
Mike Barker: co-creator and co-showrunner from seasons 1 through 10

American Dad! had a mid-season debut. Its first episode, titled "Pilot", was originally shown directly following Super Bowl XXXIX on February 6, 2005. The rest of the first season, however, would not launch until May 1, 2005, as part of the debut of Fox's Animation Domination lineup. Initially, it was a replacement for the originally failed series Family Guy (1999–2002). American Dad! was originally intended to be Fox's answer to the hordes of fans left behind from the original failure of MacFarlane's previous animated venture. Just three short months after American Dad!'s debut however, Family Guy was revived, leaving American Dad! with a formidable expectation: whether the series could distinguish itself from its counterpart and succeed on its own merits. Instead of taking over creative direction of the series, MacFarlane left the job largely in the hands of Barker and Weitzman so as to distinguish American Dad!

In its early going, American Dad! brought in strong ratings but fought an uphill battle in gaining widespread acceptance and approval from viewers and critics alike. The popularity of MacFarlane and his involvement with Family Guy had led to foregone conclusions and prejudices against American Dad! as a rip-off of the predecessor and some critics had already written off American Dad! prior to its birth as nothing more than a pale imitation of Family Guy and MacFarlane's attempts to get his old show back on the air. One example, prior to the American Dad! series debut, a writer of The Washington Post published a piece that reads "But those same executives have also given MacFarlane a whole new animated half-hour to play with in the disappointing American Dad! The new series officially premieres in May but has a sneak preview tomorrow night in the coveted post-Super Bowl time period ... The look and pace of American Dad! is the same as Family Guy."

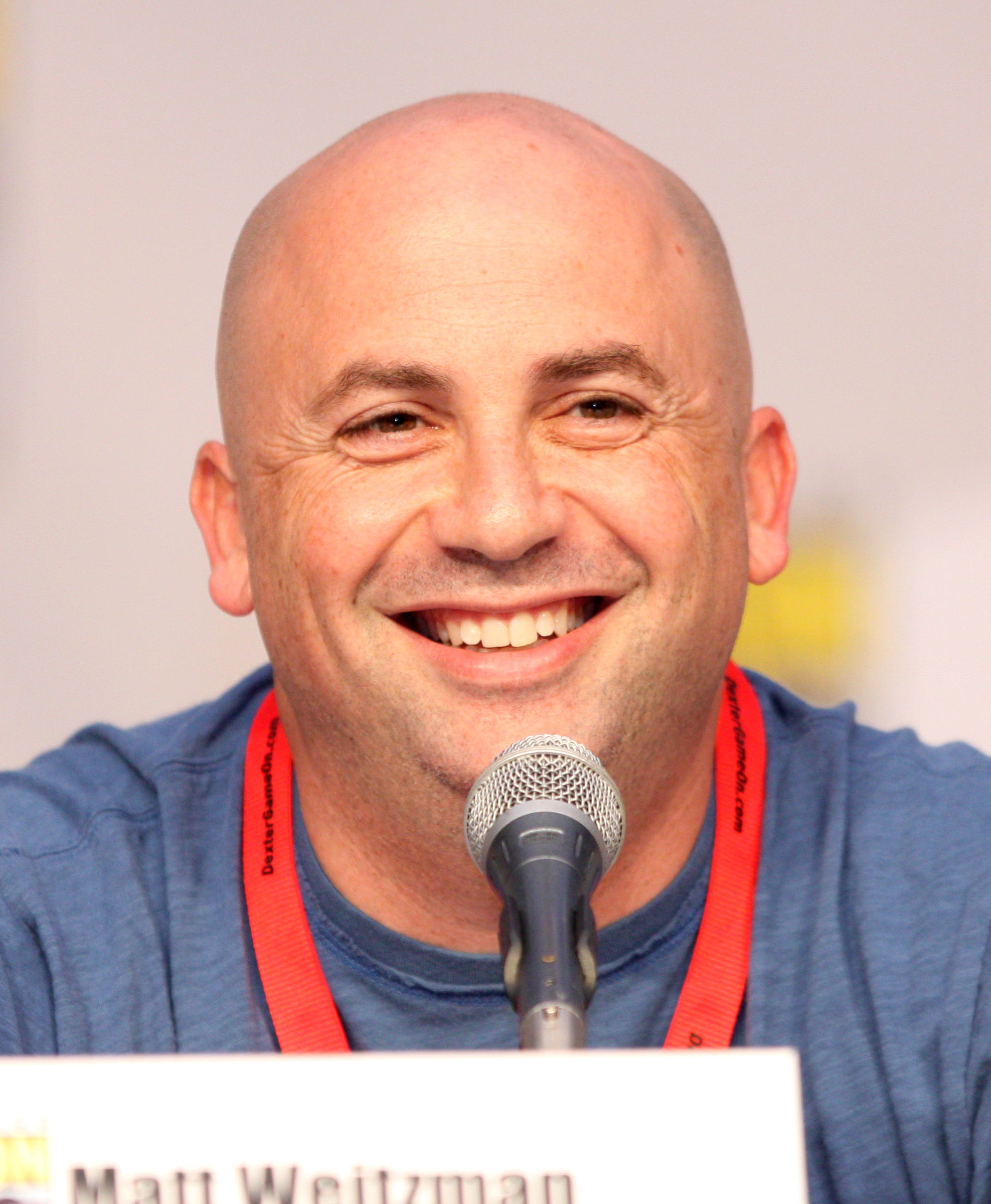
Co-creator and sole showrunner Matt Weitzman

In actuality, however, the program's beginnings take cues from the TV series All in the Family, almost a farcical animated version of the live action sitcom. Both shows make use of political satire, bigotry, ludicrous expressions of conservatism from their paternal main character (Stan likened to Archie Bunker), and equally ludicrous expressions of liberalism from their daughter character (Hayley likened to Gloria Stivic). Moreover, the daughter in both series each have a liberal hippie boyfriend turned husband (Jeff likened to Michael Stivic) to whom the daughter's conservative father is antagonistic. Also in both, the daughter lives in her parents' home with her boyfriend turned husband as a housemate. American Dad! in its original form was even said to have been inspired by All in the Family.

=== Development of American Dad!'s individuality ===
In American Dad!'s initial seasons MacFarlane was described as focusing more attention on his coexisting obligation of Family Guy. This was to the extent that American Dad! was completely secondary to him, and he did not understand the show. Because he was not getting the show at the time, he was described as "just going along for the ride". Likewise, the rest of the show's creators Mike Barker and Matt Weitzman were also trying to figure out the show and where it was going.

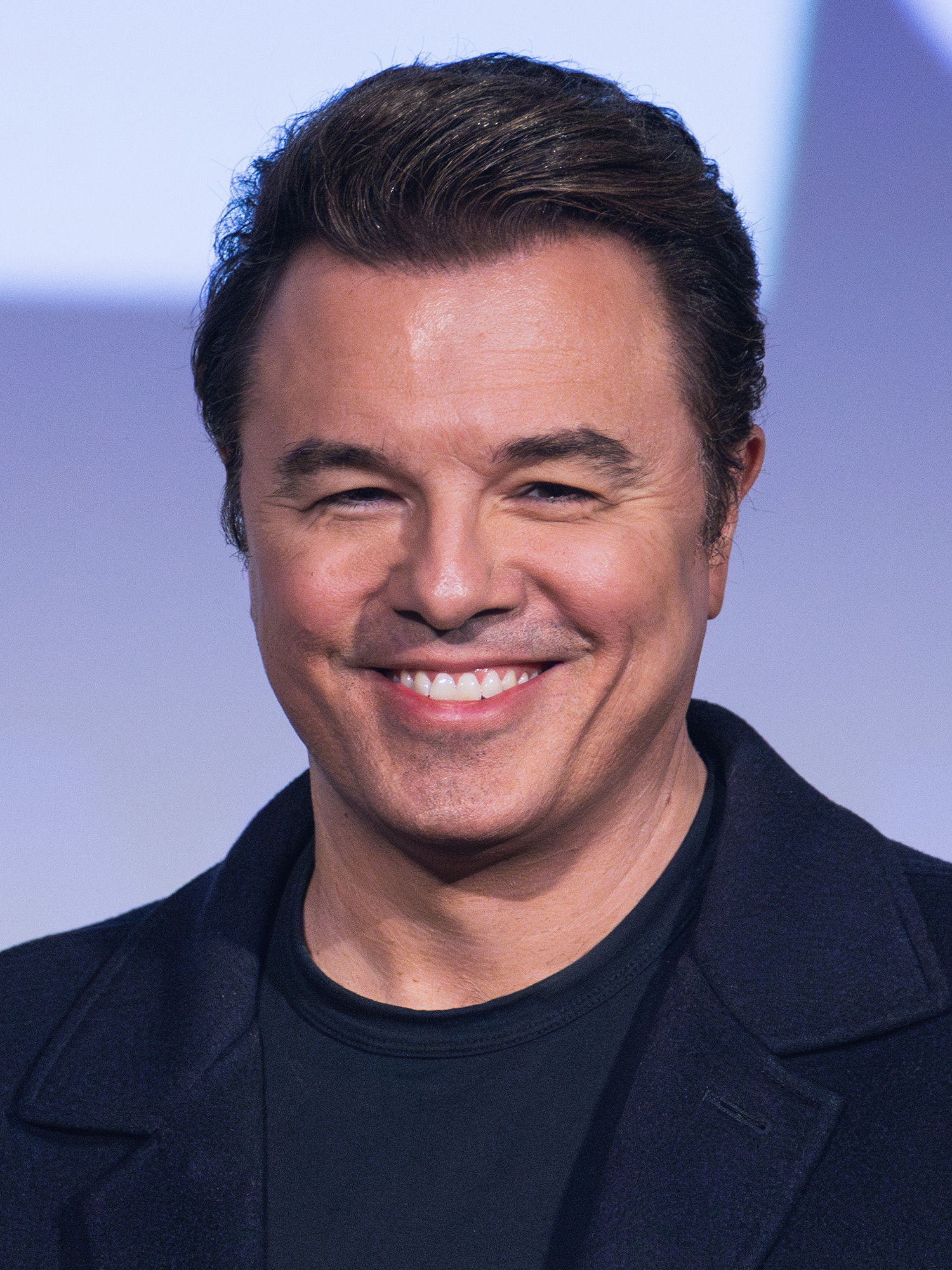
Co-creator Seth MacFarlane

After American Dad!'s initial couple of seasons and as it progressed, the show began to increasingly develop its very own distinct approach and identity, becoming more and more distinguished from all other programs on the air. Standing out from its counterparts increasingly with each passing season, the series has been described as eventually becoming the weirdest show in network prime time. It has been characterized as serving up distinguishing blasts of surrealism. As the series progressed, MacFarlane realized that Mike Barker and Matt Weitzman were on to something uniquely appealing; moreover, he realized they were on to something that sharply contrasted from Family Guy, which audiences appreciated.

After the show's first several seasons, MacFarlane not only came to fully understand and appreciate American Dad!'s value but also came to consider himself a huge fan of the series. Taking note of his Twitter followers' increased fanaticism and excitement over American Dad! and the "Roger" character, MacFarlane began putting considerable amounts of his time and efforts into the series, more so in the last several seasons than ever before (this observation made in fall 2012). In describing American Dad! comedy styles, Barker noted that it is not as reference-laden as Family Guy or South Park. He added that American Dad!'s humor more frequently derives from "the human condition and emotions that everyone can relate to: ego, the feds, etc. And for that reason, I think our humor is a little more evergreen."

=== Developing plot lines and scripts ===
On developing scripts for American Dad! episodes, co-creator Mike Barker revealed that he and the rest of the show's staff never know when and from where plot line ideas will emerge. "Just as an example," Barker explained, "All About Steve" is an episode where Stan wants his son to be more of a jock and more like he was when he was his age. That whole episode came about from one of our writers Dave Hemingson coming into our office, telling us he just visited the dentist and he may need to get braces. And the idea of a grown man with braces appealed to us, and we just decided what if we put Stan in braces, and he understands for the first time what it's like to feel like a geek."

During the 2012–13 season, Barker revealed that much of his inspiration for American Dad! plots came through listening to music. Barker's revelation to use music as a muse for his American Dad! writing came from attending the 2008 Bonnaroo Music & Arts Festival. During that event, he watched the rock band My Morning Jacket perform a four-hour set in the rain and realized from the experience that he could generate ideas for American Dad! by tapping into music: "From that point on, I realized that music should be playing a bigger role in my writing", Barker told the Louisville Courier-Journal. "Writing is hard for me, and when you hear music that inspires good ideas, you're really grateful." The beginning of the show's theme song, "Good Morning USA", uses a variation on the introduction to "Stars and Stripes Forever".

In particular, Barker has credited music from Wax Fang for his inspiration in writing certain American Dad! plots. Said Barker, "There's just something so inherently cinematic about Wax Fang's music. [Scott] Carney's voice is stunningly clear and dramatic. And his lyrics are specific enough to build stories around while staying flexible enough for different interpretations." Barker added that through listening to the Wax Fang track Majestic, he was able to come up with major plot elements for the episode "Lost in Space" (this episode features the Wax Fang songs Majestic and At Sea).

Barker has stated that once he and the rest of the show's staff get the idea for the plot line, they spend a couple of weeks in a room with all the screenwriters. There, they break the story and make sure that each act of the two act breaks are strong. As another procedure, Barker stated that they make a point of twisting the story in such a way so as to make audiences come back for more after the commercial break.

"The final process," Barker explained, "is sending a screenwriter out to write the script. The screenwriter gets two weeks to write the script. The script then comes back." Barker explained that they then all edit and rewrite it, "hopefully keeping as much of the first draft as we can and punching the jokes and making sure all the motivations are there, and then we take it to the table and read it."

In February 2005, Barker stated that as creative directors, all decisions made about the plot line and direction of the series go through himself and Weitzman. He explained that the show had reflected their point of view since the beginning. Barker has also credited the program's other staff beyond himself, Weitzman, and MacFarlane, remarking "We couldn't have made it all happen without them." At the time, it was noted that the series had a staff of 17 writers, which was described as "a big undertaking".

When Barker was asked what his favorite part was of the American Dad! pre-production process, he answered, "I like the story breaking process, personally—coming up with the stories. To me, that's the most gratifying."

Barker and Matt Weitzman have stated that they are accustomed to feeling scruples with adding certain material into the plots, but always follow this up by going ahead with incorporating the material anyway. They added that their goal is to create laughs combined with groans and going over the line.

=== Animation ===
MacFarlane played a lead role in the character designs for American Dad!.

In describing the characters' appearances, Weitzman remarked "It's all very bright, very easy on the eyes."

In explaining the animated side of the job, Barker stated, "Fifty or so animators from the Fox animation group are involved. A lot is done in-house: poses, models, props, all storyboards and timing."

Animation for American Dad! is colored and detailed overseas at Yearim Productions Co., Ltd. of Korea, which has also said to end the pre-production process.

=== Editing, completion, and deadlines ===
Barker has explained that because American Dad! creators are working in animation as opposed to live action, they have the ability to redraw and rewrite up until the show is aired.

However, Barker has also stated, "It's really hard to accept anything less than perfect when you start to get wrapped up in this process of being able to constantly make changes. Eventually you have to kind of bring down the hammer at the color stage and live with what you've got."

Barker has explained that, ultimately, the creation process of an American Dad! episode is completed upon the producers' say-so, not anyone else's.

When American Dad! co-creator Matt Weitzman was asked what his favorite part was of the show's pre-production process, he answered, "I probably enjoy the editing process a lot. I think I like the fine tuning of things and making things happen just so. Making the episode just kind of pop in its own subtle ways."

American Dad! creators have revealed to working significantly in advance of newly broadcast episodes. As many as 20 to 42 unaired episodes are typically ready for finishing touches. Barker explained that a key to this system is making sure that the writing is timeless, as opposed to topical and contemporary. He added that if any material within the script deals with contemporary issues, the creators have to hope that they're also contemporary issues two years down the line. When asked whether or not this method has ever brought on difficulties, Barker answered in the affirmative and explained:

Harriet Miers was, like, the White House Press Secretary, I think, and we had a joke about her. (Miers was a former White House Counsel, who was briefly nominated for the Supreme Court by President George W. Bush.) And I remember watching on air and having to Google who our own joke was, because it had been so long since the joke was pitched. But in terms of stories, we're less likely to be burned by a current-event issue no longer being current.

In discussing the creation of American Dad! and animated sitcoms in general, MacFarlane has stated:

It's an enormous amount of work. What goes into putting together an animated show, it's just staggering ... I always knew there was a lot of work that went into making an animated show. Doing a traditional sitcom, process-wise it feels like a breeze compared to doing an animated show. You can get it all done in a couple of months as opposed to a year. Doing an animated show, it's like putting together a little movie every week. Everything is storyboarded with the intricacy of a feature film action sequence. You have to edit with a musical score in mind. And of course, we use an orchestra for each episode. So it's really like putting together a little feature each week and I was just shocked at how much—not to underplay all the work that goes into live-action sitcoms—but my God, it's definitely a much more difficult medium to me.

Conversely, Barker has stated:

Working on animated shows like American Dad! is such a breath of fresh air. You don't have to worry about sets and such that you have to worry about for live-action. Animation can give you more freedom.

=== Setting ===
The Smith family and their housemates reside on Cherry Street in the fictional suburb of Langley Falls, Virginia, which is based on the real life towns of Langley and Great Falls in a large two-story residence with a basement and an attic. In addition, the Smith house is apparently enhanced with numerous secret rooms, facilities, and large habitats, these unorthodox attachments usually only seen once apiece (i.e., the episodes "Of Ice and Men", "Bush Comes to Dinner", "The Missing Kink", "The Full Cognitive Redaction of Avery Bullock by the Coward Stan Smith", etc.). Greg and Terry are a gay couple that live across the street from the Smiths. Within the neighborhood, they are portrayed as running a neater and tidier home than the Smiths. Greg and Terry are also the local news anchor for W-ANG-TV. Also in the area is the high school attended by Steve, Pearl Bailey High School.

=== Voice cast ===
Cast members of American Dad!
| Seth MacFarlane | Wendy Schaal | Scott Grimes | Rachael MacFarlane | Dee Bradley Baker | Jeff Fischer |
|---|---|---|---|---|---|
| Stan Smith, Roger Smith | Francine Smith | Steve Smith | Hayley Smith | Klaus Heisler, Rogu | Jeff Fischer |

The voice actors are not assembled as a group when performing the lines of their characters; rather, each of the voice actors perform their lines privately. The voice actors have stated that because of their personalities and tendency to goof off when together as a group, they would never get anything completed if they performed their lines collectively.

== Plot techniques ==
=== Farces ===
American Dad! has commonly made use of farce as most of the predicaments that befall the main characters have escalated into the extremes, to the point of getting outrageously out of hand. For example, in the episode "Home Wrecker", Stan and Francine's marital harmony breaks down from a difference of opinion on remodeling the house. It gets to the point where they divide the house in two, each decorating their half of the house in their desired fashion. Still not satisfied with this, they both attempt to drive the other out of the home and eventually erect a colossal block wall, dividing the two halves of the house. The rest of the family members are forced to spend one holiday after the next alternating between Fran's and Stan's place (the sides of the house treated as distinct homes). As another example, in the episode "Stan's Food Restaurant", Stan asks for Roger's help in starting a restaurant. As things progress, Roger makes heavy changes in the layout, eventually kicking Stan out of the project. Stan retaliates by opening another restaurant next door, which becomes a smashing success. Roger responds by blowing up Stan's restaurant but destroying his own in the process. Stan threatens to kill Roger, but backs down after Roger pulls a gun on him and tells him to relax.

=== Surreal humor ===
American Dad! plots are generally teeming with surrealism and nonsensical elements. Many of the occurrences, circumstances, and behaviors are unrestrainedly preposterous, senseless, and illogical.

As further examples of surrealism on American Dad!—in the episode "Hurricane!", a ferocious bear pauses in his attack, lowers his eyelids halfway, and repeatedly shakes his head horizontally, shaming Stan for missing him in a harpoon shot and instead spearing Francine into a wall; in the episode "Why Can't We Be Friends?", the hallways of the Smith house transform into dark and dangerous alleyways every time Roger pays Jeff then ambushes him (in disguise) to steal the money back. "The Missing Kink", Steve and family fish Klaus are shown competing in a one-on-one basketball game between each other, the score nearly tied at 11 to 10; also in the "Missing Kink" episode, the Smith house is shown to consist of a never-before-seen underworld to which various friends and acquaintances of the Smiths party and frolic; in the episode "The Full Cognitive Redaction of Avery Bullock by the Coward Stan Smith", Stan has a never-before-seen secret control room hidden underground just beside the house. The control room door's exterior side is camouflaged with the grass surrounding it. The room is filled with highly advanced, state-of-the-art equipment. Access to the control room is achieved through a handprint reading device that extends from the ground when Stan extends his arm/hand at it; etc.

=== Non sequitur/story within a story ===
Among the many forms of surreal humor and nonsense elements that have been used by American Dad! is the non sequitur/story within a story technique. This arises when the show's focus becomes sidetracked by entirely unknown and unrelated characters in circumstances that are irrelevant to the episode's main plot. Typically when this happens, it is after the show has maintained focus on its main characters for much of the episode; following this, the scenes randomly lose focus and become deeply wrapped up into the lives of never-before-seen characters who are non-central to the plot. A prime example of this is in the episode "Homeland Insecurity". As opposed to scenes focusing on main characters, attention is redirected deep into the lives of unknown characters who gain possession of Roger's gem-encrusted golden feces – this storyline of the dramas resulting from "The Golden Turd" continues in later episodes. As another example, in the episode "The Missing Kink", the show's focus is sporadically sidetracked with brief scenes revolving around the life of a drug abusing bird and Francine's inexplicable ability to both understand and communicate with the bird's chirping.

=== Plot twists and unexpected elements ===
The series has abounded with random, unexpected occurrences and surprise plot twists as result of the characters and the very makeup of the program. For example, in the episode "The Full Cognitive Redaction of Avery Bullock by the Coward Stan Smith", Steve refers to Roger for help in dealing with a school bully, Luiz. Because Steve is able to correctly predict Roger's original game plan of handling the situation himself under an alter ego, Roger throws him a curveball: he not only hires Stelio Kontos (from the episode "Bully for Steve") who was Stan's bully, to handle the matter, but hires him to bully Steve so Steve's original bully Luiz won't want another bully's sloppy seconds. Then Luiz, encouraged by Steve, goes to beat up the guy that beat him up yet learns that it is Stelio Kontos and the two bullies team up along with Roger to target Steve. The Stelio Kontos's song sounds, revamped by Roger adding "and Luiz ". As another example, in the episode "The Vacation Goo", Francine becomes frustrated that she cannot get the family together for Sunday night dinner. For family time, Stan suggests a vacation, and the Smiths have a great time in Maui as a family. This is up until Roger shuts down the mechanism Francine and the kids are all attached to so as to believe they are all on vacation. Francine and the kids then learn that Stan has been programming a pseudo-vacation every year in a contraption dubbed "the goo chambers". After learning of this, Francine demands they go on a real vacation. Twice they appear to do so, first skiing, then to Italy, until it is ultimately revealed that they are in the "goo chambers" all along, with Steve and then Hayley having programmed the vacations, respectively. In the episode "Spelling Bee My Baby", Steve deliberately misspells his words in a spelling bee so as to express his love for Akiko (who is also competing), instead spelling random Tyler Perry/Madea films.

=== Story arc use ===
Another technique used by American Dad! is the story arc. On several occasions, a circumstance expands and progresses across a collection of episodes. As an example, one of Hayley's temporary breakups with Jeff expanded across a string of episodes, in which she instead temporarily dated a black man in a koala body, Reginald Koala—known for his very urban mannerisms and behaviors. As another example, since the 9th season episode "Naked to the Limit, One More Time", Jeff Fischer has been absent from the Smith house and planet Earth altogether. In that episode, Jeff is blindsided when Roger hurls him into a spaceship. This spacecraft belongs to Roger's race of aliens and was intended to return him back to his birth planet; Roger remains behind after casting Jeff into the spaceship. The spaceship immediately takes off and Jeff is not seen until several episodes later, the episode "Lost in Space". During episodes that aired between the two aforementioned episodes, allusions to the ongoing plot line are made. For example, in the episode "Spelling Bee My Baby", Hayley is shown holding out hope for Jeff's return. In the episode, Roger and Stan attempt to rush Hayley through her grieving process so she will be willing to be their tennis official. In the episode "The Longest Distance Relationship" Jeff gets in touch with Hayley via a radio and ultimately tells her not to wait for him and to move on with her life. This story arc is finally resolved in the episode "Holy Shit, Jeff's Back!"; Jeff supposedly returns to Earth but turns out to be an alien called Zebleer masquerading as Jeff and the real Jeff has been dissected. Jeff's brain is transplanted into Zebleer's body allowing the real Jeff to live, after which Stan and Hayley's memories are wiped, leaving them unaware that Jeff is no longer entirely human. This plot point is continued at the end of "Bahama Mama", where Roger mentions Jeff cannot get Hayley pregnant because he has an alien body, so he agrees to rebirth Jeff in "Roger's Baby". By the end of the episode, Jeff is human again and with Hayley on Earth. Another example of the usage of story arcs are the Christmas Specials, starting with the Season 7 episode "For Whom the Sleigh Bell Tolls", Santa Claus became the main antagonist of the arc, vowing to get revenge on The Smiths after nearly being killed by Steve in the aforementioned episode. The storyline expands in the Season 10 episode "Minstrel Krampus", the episode concludes with a small change to the status quo, Stan's Father Jack fuses with Krampus's soul and becomes the new Krampus, up until his death in Season 17. Santa returns in the Season 14 episode "Ninety North, Zero West", where Santa kidnaps Steve to take over the world by unleashing an ancient god in the North Pole. He is seemingly killed off by falling off a cliff and breaking his neck. The storyline continues in the following Season 15 episode "Santa, Schmanta", albeit not directly related to the story arc, it does explain Santa's death and reveals he was revived at the end of the episode. Santa Claus returned in the Season 20 episode "Into the Jingleverse" where he gives Stan virtual reality goggles in order to be King of Presents forever. The story continued the following year in the Season 21 episode "Nasty Christmas" where Santa tries to get back with Mrs. Claus, although Santa in this episode is not portrayed as an antagonist, and Stan and Klaus express their disbelief that Santa escaped the Jingleverse from their last encounter.

In discussing the cartoon's distinguishing story arc element, co-creator Mike Barker explained:

We just try to obey basic rules of continuity. We try to avoid stories where a character is taking a big step like marriage and then not going back to it. I think by doing that, then in the future when we have big changes, the audience knows that they're going to be living with those changes for a while. So it's not just a thrown-away bit. It kind of endows that story beat with more power because it's going to last. It's not just going to be a reset button.

=== Black comedy ===
Much of the wit used in American Dad! has come in the form of black comedy as many of the predicaments and circumstances have made fun of the characters in life-threatening, disastrous, terrifying, and traumatic situations. As an example, the episode "A Ward Show" contains scenes of suicide and murder: Roger became Steve's legal guardian and responded to him getting picked on at school by rigging the teachers' cars with explosives and killing them all. Later on in the episode while Principal Lewis was driving his vehicle with Steve as the passenger, he informed Steve that he was about to drive off the Grand Canyon in a murder-suicide. This culminated in Roger saving the day, his love supernaturally allowing the car to fly once Principal Lewis drove off the Canyon; another vehicle with a random white man and a black boy in it (opposite of Principal Lewis, a black man and Steve, a white boy) had also, coincidentally enough, driven off the opposite side of the Grand Canyon in a murder-suicide attempt. This resulted in a midair collision between the car with Principal Lewis and Steve in it and the car with the white man and black boy in it. Another example, in the episode "Da Flippity Flop", Roger leaves a long series of harassing answering machine messages for Steve, trying to get him to sign up for his gym. In these messages, Roger is also heard snapping on various people, killing three individuals from reckless driving, landing himself in court, and subsequently becoming irate and shooting numerous people at the city courthouse for being scolded to turn off his mobile phone.

== Episodes ==
| Season | Episodes | Originally released | | |
| Season | Episodes | First released | Last released | Network |
|---|---|---|---|---|
| 1 | 7 | February 6, 2005 | June 19, 2005 | Fox |
| 2 | 16 | September 11, 2005 | May 14, 2006 | Fox |
| 3 | 19 | September 10, 2006 | May 20, 2007 | Fox |
| 4 | 16 | September 30, 2007 | May 18, 2008 | Fox |
| 5 | 20 | September 28, 2008 | May 17, 2009 | Fox |
| 6 | 18 | September 27, 2009 | May 16, 2010 | Fox |
| 7 | 19 | October 3, 2010 | May 22, 2011 | Fox |
| 8 | 18 | September 25, 2011 | May 13, 2012 | Fox |
| 9 | 19 | September 30, 2012 | May 12, 2013 | Fox |
| 10 | 20 | September 29, 2013 | May 18, 2014 | Fox |
| 11 | 3 | September 14, 2014 | September 21, 2014 | Fox |
| 12 | 15 | October 20, 2014 | June 1, 2015 | TBS |
| 13 | 22 | January 25, 2016 | June 27, 2016 | TBS |
| 14 | 22 | November 7, 2016 | September 11, 2017 | TBS |
| 15 | 22 | December 25, 2017 | April 8, 2019 | TBS |
| 16 | 20 | April 15, 2019 | August 26, 2019 | TBS |
| 17 | 24 | April 13, 2020 | December 21, 2020 | TBS |
| 18 | 22 | April 19, 2021 | October 25, 2021 | TBS |
| 19 | 22 | January 24, 2022 | December 19, 2022 | TBS |
| 20 | 22 | March 27, 2023 | December 18, 2023 | TBS |
| 21 | 22 | October 28, 2024 | March 24, 2025 | TBS |
| 22 | 13 | February 22, 2026 | September 13, 2026 | Fox |

=== Season number discrepancies ===
There are multiple conflicting reports and models of the number of seasons American Dad! has had.

- One of the reports upholds a one-season-fewer numbering model: Under this arrangement, season 1 is a combination of both the first 7 episodes and the following 16 episodes, despite the separation of these two episode collections by a summer hiatus. Under this arrangement, season 1 consists of 23 episodes.
- The other report upholds a one-season-more numbering model: Under this arrangement, season 1 ended after the program's first 7 episodes leading into the summer hiatus. Season 2 then picked up when the following 16 episodes began that fall. Under this arrangement, season 1 is uncharacteristically shorter in contrast to the rest of the show's seasons, consisting of only 7 episodes, just like MacFarlane's other show, Family Guy.
- Hulu combines episodes 1–23 into season 1, and combines episodes 173–190 into season 10. The same can be said for its sister streaming service Disney+.

Commentary from American Dad! co-creators Matt Weitzman and Mike Barker has largely been consistent with (A): on September 28, 2012, the two were interviewed and reported that they had 20 episodes completed for the then imminent "eighth season", and were "developing our ninth season". During the show's life on Fox, however, the network contradicted that arrangement, presenting information on the show's then website that followed (B): in listing all episodes from the 2012–13 season, Fox reported each as existing as part of the show's "ninth season". In addition, Fox contradicted its own American Dad! website, also supporting the one-season-fewer numbering scheme: FoxFlash, which is the publicity center for Fox, labeled the 2012–13 broadcasts as the "eighth season". Websites releasing the show's season-based ratings have also used the one-season-fewer numbering method.

=== Episode misreporting ===
Fox advertisements for the episode "Lost in Space" promoted the episode as American Dad!'s 150th. Subsequently, numerous mainstream media reports also labeled the episode as the 150th. In actuality, it was the show's 151st episode, while the episode "The Full Cognitive Redaction of Avery Bullock by the Coward Stan Smith" was the series' actual 150th episode. In addition, Fox promoted the episode's plot as the revealing of Roger's birth planet. While the setting of this episode is a spaceship owned by members of Roger's alien race, to date, Roger's birth planet has yet to be revealed.

In 2020, after airing the first episode of the seventeenth season, TBS aired two episodes that had originally been scheduled to air at the end of the previous season before being pulled from the schedule. While TBS's official website lists these two episodes, "Downtown" and "Cheek to Cheek: A Stripper's Story", as season 14 (Wikipedia's season 16) episodes 21 and 22, the official YouTube playlist includes them in season 15 (Wikipedia's season 17) as episodes 2 and 3. TBS also promoted the 299th episode, titled "300", as the series' three hundredth episode which was in fact the 300th produced, but aired as the 299th episode as the episode "Yule. Tide. Repeat." which was produced prior to "300" was not scheduled to air before the broadcast of "300".

== Adjustments in on-air presentation, production, and broadcasts ==
=== The unaired precursory pilot ===
While the series premiere of American Dad! is titled "Pilot", "Pilot" is not the show's actual pilot presentation. The actual pilot is a six-minute version of the first six minutes in the series premiere. This precursory pilot was used by MacFarlane, Barker, and Weitzman to sell American Dad! to Fox and was never aired along with the rest of the series.

While much of the dialogue and general scenery were simply redone between the precursory pilot and the following series premiere, there are sharp distinctions between the two. Differences also exist between the precursory pilot and the official series as a whole. Most of these are in the pictorial technique. For example, scenes from the pilot are drawn in a rougher, more cursory fashion with weaker coloration than scenes from the official series. Most prominently, Steve's physical design and outfit in the predecessor greatly contrast from his official design and outfit. In addition, Steve is voiced by Ricky Blitt in the precursory pilot but by Scott Grimes in the official series. There are also variations in Steve's personality.

=== Characterization ===
Early episodes of the series featured political banter between the conservative Stan and liberal Hayley. However, the creators learned quickly that this had only "a limited shelf life" and did not provide them as much as they originally thought it would. Said co-creator Matt Weitzman, "There are times when we still have that kind of dynamic between them, but not nearly what it was in the first season. And I think the show, honestly, has grown and benefited from it, because that would have gotten boring after a while."

Roger was enhanced by being provided with a running gag of alternate disguises and freedom to exist outside of the Smith house. The show's original concept basically portrayed him as being similar to ALF, having him sit in the house all day while commenting on life. The creators, however, have stated that the character was far too much fun to keep restricted to the house, and having him interact with different people provided for much material. The creators have further appreciated the direction of Roger for the fact that he almost serves as a different guest star for each episode what with his many alter egos. The show's staff believe this element of the show highlights MacFarlane's versatility as he voices Roger and his countless alter egos.

There have been three versions of the "Steve" character, the creators having twice made considerable adjustments to his design. Steve's initial design ended up being a one-off execution limited to the unaired precursory pilot (not to be confused with the series premiere, titled "Pilot"). By the season premiere, Scott Grimes had begun voicing Steve, and his design was made taller, more filled out, and less geeky. After early seasons of the series, Steve was remodeled again. This time he was made softer, more emotional, cuter and more endearing, creating a sharper contrast to his father Stan's ruggedness and machismo.

Between the eighth and ninth seasons, there were significant changes in the show's writing staff. Mike Barker mentions (with one-season-less numbering) "We lost some animators, and we lost a lot of writers. Season eight, our writing staff is about 65–70 percent new."

=== Network relocation from Fox to TBS ===
On July 16, 2013, it was announced that American Dad! had been cancelled by Fox. Shortly thereafter, however, cable channel TBS picked up the show for a 15-episode eleventh season, which premiered on October 20, 2014. Along with airing original episodes, TBS also airs reruns of American Dad! in syndication. The tenth season was initially to be the final one on Fox; however, on July 20, 2014, it was announced that Fox had three unaired episodes left for broadcast. Two of the three aired back-to-back on September 14, 2014, and the final one aired on September 21, 2014. Reports from Fox seemed to imply that these three episodes constituted a season of their own, season 10. Among multiple discrepant reports from TBS however, one indicated that the three episodes were the beginning of the 11th season to resume on their network. TBS actually debuted their first episode through social media websites YouTube and Facebook on October 13, 2014; the October 20, 2014, date applies to the linear television debut.

On the show's network relocation, Mike Barker has stated, "It's going to be the same American Dad!, just in a different place." Barker also joked that the network relocation was to execute a Tyler Perry crossover Barker and American Dad! production staff had long aspired to.

Due to the uncertain future of the series, there have been three potential series finales. Hot Water, Echoes and Guardian were all written to serve as a final episode for the show.

=== Mike Barker's exit ===
On November 4, 2013, it was announced that Mike Barker had departed American Dad! Barker had served for ten seasons as the show's co-creator/executive and producer/co-showrunner. Matt Weitzman is now serving as the show's sole showrunner. The news came as early production for season 11 commenced. As of November 2013, the show's production crew was developing its first four episodes for season 11, slated to begin airing on October 20, 2014, when American Dad! moved to TBS. Barker remained under an overall contract with 20th Century Fox Television.

Following Mike Barker's exit, Brian Boyle replaced him as the showrunner for the television series.

=== 2023 showrunners strike ===
On May 12, 2023, it was announced that the showrunners of American Dad, including Seth MacFarlane, would temporarily leave the show as a result of the 2023 Writers Guild of America Strike. They returned to the show on September 27, 2023, once the strike was declared to be over.

=== Return to Fox ===
On March 21, 2025, it was announced that TBS had declined to order new episodes after the season 21 finale, which aired on March 24. It was later announced that same day that contract negotiations were underway that could see the show return to Fox, after having left the network in September 2014. Re-runs will continue to air on TBS, along with its sister networks Adult Swim and TruTV through 2030. In April 2025, it was announced the series would return to Fox with its twenty-second season, following a four-season pickup order from the network; this renewal will take the show through the 2028–2029 television season. It was later announced in October 2025 that this show would serve as a replacement for the now-cancelled The Great North. This season premiered on February 22, 2026, where it aired as part of Fox's Sunday Animation Domination block with Family Guy and Universal Basic Guys.

== Reception ==
=== Critical reception ===
The show has received positive reviews. In the Common Sense Media article, author Tony Nigro gave it a positive review stating, "Issues like patriotism, generational divide, political activism, and traditional gender roles are addressed here, all with more fantasy than reality, but enough of the latter to touch a nerve with some grown-ups." In 2016, a study by The New York Times of the 50 TV shows with the most Facebook Likes found that American Dad! is popular in the Northeastern United States and the Mid-Atlantic states, as well as the Great Lakes Region; however, it "is not popular in Utah or much of the South".

=== Ratings ===
Until season 12, when American Dad! moved to TBS, all but one episode originally aired on Animation Domination. The program's series premiere is the only episode that pre-dates the Animation Domination lineup. In addition, American Dad!'s series premiere predated the rest of the first season by roughly three months. The series premiere episode, "Pilot", aired directly following Fox's broadcast of Super Bowl XXXIX on February 6, 2005. The episode aired alongside The Simpsons and pulled in 15 million viewers, with 23 million viewers overall. Both Animation Domination and the rest of the show's first season commenced on May 1, 2005. The show returned with the episode "Threat Levels", obtaining 9.47 million viewers, after the season premiere/revival of Family Guy.

On November 18, 2014, it was reported that the show's outstanding performance in cable had quickly moved TBS to order another season of the series, bringing the show to thirteen seasons.

Nielsen Media Research, which records streaming viewership on certain U.S. television screens, reported that American Dad was the tenth most-streamed acquired program between January and June 2025, with 12.972 billion minutes of watch time. In December 2025, Disney announced that American Dad was among the television series to surpass one billion hours streamed on Disney+ in 2025. During the first half of 2026, American Dad! recorded 10.26 billion minutes of watch time, ranking it as the seventeenth most-streamed acquired series, according to Nielsen Media Research. American Dad! accumulated 24.8 billion minutes of viewing across linear television and streaming platforms between September 22, 2025, and September 20, 2026, ranking as the eighth most-watched animated series during that period.

==== Nielsen ratings ====
| Season | Timeslot (ET) | No. of episodes | Network | First aired | | Last aired | | TV Season | Overall ratings | |
| Season | Timeslot (ET) | No. of episodes | Network | Date | Premiere viewers (in millions) | Date | Finale viewers (in millions) | TV Season | Rank | Viewers (in millions) |
|---|---|---|---|---|---|---|---|---|---|---|
| 1 | Sunday 11:14 pm (Episode 1); Sunday 9:30 pm (Episodes 2–7) | 7 | Fox | February 6, 2005 | 15.15 | June 19, 2005 | 6.55 | 2004–05 | 67 | 8.49 |
| 2 | Sunday 9:30 pm | 16 | Fox | September 11, 2005 | 7.83 | May 14, 2006 | 6.86 | 2005–06 | 97 | 7.16 |
| 3 | Sunday 8:30 pm (Episodes 1–10); Sunday 9:30 pm (Episodes 11–19) | 19 | Fox | September 10, 2006 | 8.93 | May 20, 2007 | 7.62 | 2006–07 | 79 | 7.6 |
| 4 | Sunday 9:30 pm | 16 | Fox | September 30, 2007 | 6.07 | May 18, 2008 | 5.64 | 2007–08 | 105 | 6.6 |
| 5 | Sunday 9:30 pm | 20 | Fox | September 28, 2008 | 6.89 | May 17, 2009 | 5.64 | 2008–09 | 96 | 5.5 |
| 6 | Sunday 9:30 pm (Episodes 1–4, 6–18); Sunday 7:30 pm (Episode 5) | 18 | Fox | September 27, 2009 | 7.14 | May 16, 2010 | 5.89 | 2009–10 | 84 | 5.9 |
| 7 | Sunday 9:30 pm (Episodes 1–8, 13); Sunday 7:30 pm (Episodes 9–12, 14–15, 17–19); Sunday 8:30 pm (Episode 16) | 19 | Fox | October 3, 2010 | 6.16 | May 22, 2011 | 3.57 | 2010–11 | 111 | 4.07 |
| 8 | Sunday 9:30 pm | 18 | Fox | September 25, 2011 | 5.83 | May 13, 2012 | 4.13 | 2011–12 | 110 | 5.47 |
| 9 | Sunday 9:30 pm (Episodes 1–12, 14–19); Sunday 7:30 pm (Episode 13) | 19 | Fox | September 30, 2012 | 5.25 | May 12, 2013 | 4.01 | 2012–13 | 84 | 5.24 |
| 10 | Sunday 9:30 pm (Episodes 1–11); Sunday 7:30 pm (Episodes 12–20) | 20 | Fox | September 29, 2013 | 4.32 | May 18, 2014 | 2.36 | 2013–14 | 89 | 5.14 |
| 11 | Sunday 9:00 pm (Episode 1); Sunday 9:30 pm (Episodes 2–3) | 3 | Fox | September 14, 2014 | 2.62 | September 21, 2014 | 3.03 | 2014–15 | TBA | 2.77 |
| 12 | Monday 9:00 pm | 15 | TBS | October 20, 2014 | 1.09 | June 1, 2015 | 1.113 | 2014–15 | TBA | 1.118 |
| 13 | Monday 8:30 pm | 22 | TBS | January 25, 2016 | 1.04 | June 27, 2016 | 0.98 | 2015–16 | TBA | TBA |
| 14 | Monday 8:30 pm (Episodes 1–7); Monday 10:00 pm (Episodes 8–22) | 22 | TBS | November 7, 2016 | 1.00 | September 11, 2017 | 0.86 | 2016–17 | TBA | TBA |
| 15 | Monday 8:00 pm (Episode 1); Monday 10:00 pm (Episodes 2–22) | 22 | TBS | December 25, 2017 | 0.86 | April 8, 2019 | 0.75 | 2017–19 | TBA | TBA |
| 16 | Monday 10:00 pm | 22 | TBS | April 15, 2019 | 0.77 | April 27, 2020 | 0.67 | 2019–20 | TBA | TBA |
| 17 | Monday 10:00 pm | 22 | TBS | April 13, 2020 | 0.69 | December 21, 2020 | 0.55 | 2020 | TBA | TBA |
| 18 | Monday 10:00 pm (Episodes 1–21); Monday 9:30 pm (Episode 22) | 22 | TBS | April 19, 2021 | 0.56 | October 25, 2021 | 0.37 | 2021 | TBA | TBA |
| 19 | Monday 10:00 pm | 22 | TBS | January 24, 2022 | TBA | December 19, 2022 | TBA | 2022 | TBA | TBA |
| 20 | Monday 10:00 pm | 22 | TBS | March 27, 2023 | TBA | December 18, 2023 | TBA | 2023 | TBA | TBA |

=== Awards and nominations ===
| Award | Year | Category | Nominee(s) | Result | Ref. |
|---|---|---|---|---|---|
| Annie Awards | 2007 | Best Writing in an Animated Television Production | Dan Vebber (for "The American Dad After School Special") | Nominated | |
| Annie Awards | 2010 | Directing in a Television Production | Pam Cooke and Jansen Lee (for "Brains, Brains & Automobiles") | Nominated | |
| Artios Awards | 2010 | Animation TV Programming | Linda Lamontagne | Nominated | |
| Artios Awards | 2013 | Television Animation | Linda Lamontagne | Nominated | |
| Artios Awards | 2015 | Television Animation | Linda Lamontagne | Nominated | |
| Artios Awards | 2016 | Television Animation | Linda Lamontagne | Nominated | |
| Artios Awards | 2017 | Television Animation | Linda Lamontagne | Nominated | |
| Artios Awards | 2018 | Television Animation | Linda Lamontagne | Nominated | |
| ASCAP Awards | 2013 | Top Television Series | American Dad! | Won | |
| GLAAD Media Award | 2007 | Outstanding Individual Episode | American Dad! (for "Lincoln Lover") | Nominated | |
| Gold Derby Awards | 2008 | Animated Series | American Dad! | Nominated | |
| Gold Derby Awards | 2009 | Animated Series | American Dad! | Nominated | |
| Golden Reel Awards | 2006 | Best Sound Editing in Television Animated | American Dad! (for "Homeland Insecurity") | Nominated | |
| Golden Reel Awards | 2007 | Best Sound Editing in Television Animated | American Dad! (for "Dungeon and Wagons") | Nominated | |
| It List Awards | 2012 | Favourite International TV Show | American Dad! | Nominated | |
| People's Choice Awards | 2015 | Favorite Animated TV Show | American Dad! | Nominated | |
| People's Choice Awards | 2016 | Favorite Animated TV Show | American Dad! | Nominated | |
| People's Choice Awards | 2017 | Favorite Animated TV Show | American Dad! | Nominated | |
| Primetime Emmy Awards | 2009 | Outstanding Animated Program | American Dad! (for "1600 Candles") | Nominated | |
| Primetime Emmy Awards | 2012 | Outstanding Animated Program | American Dad! (for "Hot Water") | Nominated | |
| Primetime Emmy Awards | 2017 | Outstanding Character Voice-Over Performance | Dee Bradley Baker (for "Fight and Flight") | Nominated | |
| Primetime Emmy Awards | 2018 | Outstanding Character Voice-Over Performance | Seth MacFarlane (for "The Talented Mr. Dingleberry") | Nominated | |
| Prism Award | 2007 | Mental Health | American Dad! | Won | |
| Prism Award | 2009 | Comedy Episode | American Dad! (for "Spring Break-Up") | Nominated | |
| Teen Choice Awards | 2005 | Choice Summer Series | American Dad! | Nominated | |
| Teen Choice Awards | 2005 | Choice V-Cast | American Dad! | Nominated | |
| Teen Choice Awards | 2006 | Choice TV: Animated Show | American Dad! | Nominated | |
| Teen Choice Awards | 2008 | Choice TV: Animated Show | American Dad! | Nominated | |
| Teen Choice Awards | 2009 | Choice TV: Animated Show | American Dad! | Nominated | |
| Teen Choice Awards | 2010 | Choice TV: Animated Show | American Dad! | Nominated | |
| Teen Choice Awards | 2011 | Choice TV: Animated Show | American Dad! | Nominated | |

== Other media ==
=== Home media ===
Internationally, American Dad! is available to stream with Star on Disney+ with the first 22 seasons.

American Dad! home video releases
| Season | | Episodes | Release dates | | |
| Season | | Episodes | Region 1 | Region 2 | Region 4 |
|---|---|---|---|---|---|
| 1 | 2005 | 7 | April 25, 2006 | April 24, 2006 | May 24, 2006 |
| 2 | 2005–2006 | 16 | April 25, 2006 (1–6); May 15, 2007 (7–16) | April 24, 2006 (1–6); May 28, 2007 (7–16) | May 24, 2006 (1–6); May 21, 2007 (7–16) |
| 3 | 2006–2007 | 19 | May 15, 2007 (1–9); April 15, 2008 (10–19) | May 28, 2007 (1–9); May 12, 2008 (10–19) | May 21, 2007 (1–9); May 14, 2008 (10–19) |
| 4 | 2007–2008 | 16 | April 15, 2008 (1–7, 9); April 28, 2009 (8, 10–16) | May 12, 2008 (1–7, 9); April 20, 2009 (8, 10–16) | May 14, 2008 (1–7, 9); November 18, 2009 (8, 10–16) |
| 5 | 2008–2009 | 20 | April 28, 2009 (1–6); June 15, 2010 (7–20) | April 20, 2009 (1–6); June 14, 2010 (7–20) | November 18, 2009 (1–6); November 3, 2010 (7–20) |
| 6 | 2009–2010 | 18 | April 19, 2011 | June 27, 2011 | July 13, 2011 |
| 7 | 2010–2011 | 19 | April 17, 2012 | May 14, 2012 | May 16, 2012 |
| 8 | 2011–2012 | 18 | September 24, 2013 | August 5, 2013 | August 21, 2013 |
| 9 | 2012–2013 | 19 | July 1, 2014 | October 6, 2014 | September 3, 2014 |
| 10 | 2013–2014 | 20 | May 21, 2015 | October 17, 2016 | January 6, 2016 |
| 11 | 2014 | 3 | December 13, 2016 | November 14, 2016 | November 30, 2016 |
| 12 | 2014–2015 | 15 | December 13, 2016 | November 14, 2016 | November 30, 2016 |
| 13 | 2016 | 22 | November 7, 2017 | November 13, 2017 | November 8, 2017 |
| 14 | 2016–2017 | 22 | November 6, 2018 | November 12, 2018 | November 21, 2018 |

=== Soundtracks ===
To promote the season 9 episode "Love, AD Style", an album Hayley Sings by Hayley's voice actress Rachael MacFarlane was released by Concord Records. A soundtrack album, American Dad!: Greatest Hits, was released on October 25, 2024, by Hollywood Records. The soundtrack includes 19 different songs from the show's history.

=== Video games ===
In 2015, in celebration of the show's tenth anniversary, an American Dad! digital pinball table was released on Zen Studios' Zen Pinball 2 and Pinball FX 2. The game features paper cutouts of the main cast in the background, and clips from past seasons of the show.

In September 2016, the characters appeared in a card game titled Animation Throwdown: The Quest for Cards. The multiplatform card game features Stan Smith and Roger Smith from American Dad! alongside characters from Family Guy, Futurama, Bob's Burgers, King of the Hill, and Archer.

Playtech licensed American Dad! for a range of online gambling products, which began operating in 2017.

In 2019, Reliance Games released American Dad! Apocalypse Soon, a mobile game which accumulated over 10 million downloads across the Android and Apple platforms.

In 2022, the Smiths appeared in the mobile racing game Warped Kart Racers, along with characters from Family Guy and King of the Hill, as well as Solar Opposites.

=== Crossovers with other animated sitcoms ===
American Dad! characters have appeared on other animated sitcoms and vice versa. Characters have appeared on several episodes of Family Guy and The Cleveland Show; the three shows were part of the crossover event Night of the Hurricane in 2011. The Simpsons had also referenced American Dad! in the season 17 episode, "The Italian Bob", where a picture of Stan can be glimpsed in an Italian sheriff's police book of criminal offenders. Peter Griffin is dubbed "Plagiarismo" (faux Italian for Plagiarism) and Stan is dubbed "Plagiarismo di Plagiarismo" (Plagiarism of Plagiarism). Also, in the season 25 episode of The Simpsons, "Homerland", the Smiths appear in the end credits to celebrate the twenty-fifth season of The Simpsons, alongside the families from Family Guy, The Cleveland Show, and Bob's Burgers. Bart Simpson makes a cameo appearance in the American Dad! season 10 episode, "Faking Bad". Stan makes a brief cameo as a background character in one panel of a Futurama Comics 2007 issue, "Futurama Returns". The intro to the show was parodied twice in Family Guy, first being in Season 9 where we see Joe Swanson replace Stan. The second being in Season 18 where we see Meg Griffin replace Stan after she's "traded over" to American Dad, though she stumbles through the lyrics and is told to "shut up" by Stan and Roger.

At Comic-Con 2022, showrunner and co-creator Matt Weitzman discussed the possibility of a crossover with the live-action sci-fi series The Orville, another series created by Seth MacFarlane.

=== Cancelled film adaptation ===
At Comic-Con 2013 on July 20, Mike Barker hinted at plans for an American Dad! movie centering on Roger and set on his birth planet, but at Comic-Con 2022, Matt Weitzman revealed plans for a feature film were scrapped.

== See also ==
- Family Guy
- The Cleveland Show
