= American Dad! season 16 =

American Dad!
- Season 16
- Promotional poster for the 16th season
- Starring: Seth MacFarlane; Wendy Schaal; Scott Grimes; Rachael MacFarlane; Dee Bradley Baker
- No. of episodes: 20

Release
- Original network: TBS
- Original release: April 15 – August 26, 2019

Season chronology
- ← Previous; Season 15 Next → Season 17

The sixteenth season of the American TV series American Dad! originally aired on TBS from April 15, 2019, to August 26, 2019, and consisted of 20 episodes.

== Episodes ==
No. overall	No. in season	Title	Directed by	Written by	Original release date	Prod. code	U.S. viewers (millions)
257	1	"Fantasy Baseball"	Jansen Yee	Tim Saccardo	April 15, 2019	DAJN01	0.77
Steve joins the town's baseball team as an umpire, and his antics lead to Steve being hired to change baseball into a live-action role-playing game, which doesn't sit well with Stan. Meanwhile, Francine's and Roger's favorite soap opera, Sex Hospital, gets canceled, leading Roger to stage soap opera scenarios with real people so he and Francine can get their daytime drama fix.
258	2	"I Am the Jeans: The Gina Lavetti Story"	Joe Daniello	Nicole Shabtai	April 22, 2019	DAJN02	0.70
Francine tries to be a better friend to Gina Lavetti, one of Roger's personas, when Lavetti begins making and marketing jeans for the average woman. Meanwhile, in a spoof of Freaky Friday, Stan and Steve magically swap eyebrows and must learn what it's like to walk a mile in each other's facial features.
259	3	"Stan & Francine & Connie & Ted"	Pam Cooke & Valerie Fletcher	Jeff Kauffmann	April 29, 2019	DAJN03	0.82
Steve introduces Stan and Francine to Barry's parents, and soon regrets it when he discovers that Barry's parents are swingers looking for a new couple. Meanwhile, Roger goes blind after staring into an eclipse and is tricked into thinking he's a Daredevil-esque superhero who fights with heightened senses.
260	4	"Rabbit Ears"	Tim Parsons & Jennifer Graves	Brett Cawley & Robert Maitia	May 6, 2019	DAJN04	0.82
On Big Trash Eve, Stan brings home an old television that airs a Playboy After Dark-esque talk show with a disturbing secret. Meanwhile, Roger inexplicably becomes a baby and the rest of the family waits on him hand and foot.
261	5	"Jeff and the Dank Ass Weed Factory"	Chris Bennett	Joe Chandler & Nic Wegener	May 13, 2019	DAJN05	0.82
In this stoner parody of Charlie and the Choclate Factory, Jeff wins the chance to tour Tommie Tokes' (voiced by Snoop Dogg) marijuana factory, and Stan comes along so he can take down Tokes as part of his CIA mission.
262	6	"Lost Boys"	Josue Cervantes	Joel Hurwitz	May 20, 2019	DAJN06	0.75
Roger breaks up Steve's friendship with Snot, Barry, and Toshi after Steve refuses to be Roger's squash partner. Meanwhile, Hayley, Stan, and Francine think Jeff has a gift for flipping houses.
263	7	"Shark?!"	Shawn Murray	Jordan Blum & Parker Deay	May 27, 2019	DAJN07	0.76
Stan has Roger pretend to be a shark in order to make Steve overcome his fear of the ocean, turning Steve into an adrenaline junkie after he loses his arm. Meanwhile, Klaus struggles with dating Hayley's hot friend, Danuta.
264	8	"The Long March"	Rodney Clouden	Charles Suozzi	June 3, 2019	DAJN08	0.73
Scared at the prospect of her life becoming a grind after getting a promotion at Sub Hub, Hayley quits her job, moves into Jeff's van, and lives life on the road as an Instagram promoter. Meanwhile, Steve and Francine are menaced by a creepy Uber driver named Ernie after giving him a bad review.
265	9	"The Hall Monitor and the Lunch Lady"	Jansen Yee	Zack Rosenblatt	June 10, 2019	DAJN09	0.81
When Klaus gets fired from his job serving lunch at Pearl Bailey High, Steve works with Detective Turlington and goes undercover as a hall monitor to solve the mystery. Meanwhile, Roger and Stan go catatonic after seeing Steve's tailor die in a horrific escalator accident.
266	10	"Wild Women Do"	Joe Daniello	Marc Carusiello	June 17, 2019	DAJN10	0.79
Stan recruits Jeff to take Francine out on the town and keep her from going wild. Meanwhile, Klaus abducts Steve and forces him to watch his celebrity impression video.
267	11	"An Irish Goodbye"	Pam Cooke & Valerie Fletcher	Laura Beason	June 24, 2019	DAJN11	0.69
While Stan, Jeff, Roger, and Rogu pretend to be frontiersmen, Hayley discovers that Francine deals with Stan's childish ways by drinking at an Irish airport bar and Hayley begins to flock there to escape Jeff.
268	12	"Stompe Le Monde"	Tim Parsons & Jennifer Graves	Zack Rosenblatt	July 1, 2019	DAJN12	0.63
When his uncle dies and leaves him with a large inheritance, Stan uses the money to buy the rights to the off-Broadway play Stomp rather than a family vacation, leading to a life on the road, scamming townspeople.
269	13	"Mom Sauce"	Chris Bennett	Sasha Stroman	July 8, 2019	DAJN13	0.65
Snot's mom gets rich selling homemade dipping sauce, which doesn't sit well with Steve when he finds out that Snot's mom stole the recipe. Meanwhile, Klaus, Stan, Roger, and Jeff become mall models.
270	14	"Hamerican Dad!"	Josue Cervantes	Sam Brenner	July 15, 2019	DAJN14	0.85
Stan reluctantly lets Roger into his ham club -- and Roger ends up winning over the other members. Meanwhile, Francine decides to scare her next door neighbor, Greg.
271	15	"Demolition Daddy"	Shawn Murray	Paul Stroud	July 22, 2019	DAJN15	0.76
Thanks to Roger, Snot discovers that his long-deceased father was a demolition derby driver. Meanwhile, Hayley teaches Steve how to drive by taking him on a truck run.
272	16	"Pride Before the Fail"	Rodney Clouden	Soren Bowie	July 29, 2019	DAJN16	0.69
Roger tries to force Hayley into graduating from community college so he can move into her room. Meanwhile, Klaus repairs Francine's car and turns the garage into a mechanic's shop.
273	17	"Enter Stanman"	Jansen Yee	Jeff Kauffmann	August 5, 2019	DAJN17	0.76
Stan gets jealous of Francine when Francine admits she had a sex dream about Jeff, so he recruits Roger (as his new therapist character, Dr. Buttblast, the twin of the recently deceased Dr. Penguin) to go inside Francine's mind while she sleeps... and ends up releasing a vampiric monster that represents Stan's insecurity.
274	18	"No Weddings and a Funeral"	Joe Daniello	Tim Saccardo	August 12, 2019	DAJN18	0.73
Klaus runs away from home, tired of being the family's punching bag. 15 years later, the Smiths (all of whom have changed during Klaus' absence: Hayley and Jeff have moved out and are parents, Steve has bulked up and is head of his own tech company, Roger has become famous for his memoir about being an alien, Francine has married Toshi, and Stan has gained weight, lost most of his hair, and lives in a dirty apartment with a suicidal cat) hear that Klaus has died, and a nun forces them to have a funeral for Klaus.
275	19	"Eight Fires"	Pam Cooke & Valerie Fletcher	Brett Cawley & Robert Maitia	August 19, 2019	DAJN19	0.75
Roger helps Francine be a better cook by taking her to a remote island in Patagonia. Meanwhile, Stan becomes a mute piano virtuoso after getting a nail stuck in his head.
276	20	"The Hand That Rocks the Rogu"	Tim Parsons & Jennifer Graves	Jordan Blum & Parker Deay	August 26, 2019	DAJN20	0.68
To prove to Francine that he's responsible enough to babysit, Steve looks after Roger's tumor, Rogu, while Roger (dressed in the prostitute costume he wore in "Persona Assistant") goes out on a date with Dick. Meanwhile, Stan tries to find an exotic dish for the CIA exotic food club and ends up spelunking for oyster cans at the late-night grocery store.
