= American Dad! season 14 =

American Dad!
- Season 14
- Region 1 cover art for "Volume 13"
- Starring: Seth MacFarlane; Wendy Schaal; Scott Grimes; Rachael MacFarlane; Dee Bradley Baker
- No. of episodes: 22

Release
- Original network: TBS
- Original release: November 7, 2016 – September 11, 2017

Season chronology
- ← Previous; Season 13 Next → Season 15

The fourteenth season of the American TV series American Dad! originally aired on TBS from November 7, 2016, to September 11, 2017, and consisted of 22 episodes. On August 27, 2015, TBS renewed the series for a fifteenth season.

Guest stars for the season include Jemaine Clement, Jennifer Coolidge, Rosie O'Donnell, Walton Goggins, Wiz Khalifa, Alfred Molina, Andy Richter, Susan Sarandon, Rick Steves, Bear Grylls, Phil Keoghan, and Corey Stoll.

== Episodes ==
No. overall	No. in season	Title	Directed by	Written by	Original release date	Prod. code	U.S. viewers (millions)
213	1	"Father's Daze"	Chris Bennett	Jordan Blum & Parker Deay	November 7, 2016	BAJN01	1.00
After realizing his family forgot Father's Day, Stan confronts them, leading them to decide to celebrate it the next day. But after his celebration doesn't live up to his expectations, he uses CIA technology to trick the family into reliving the same day until they get it right. Meanwhile, the saga of the Golden Turd continues when a Senator running for President kills his running mate, and a cleaning lady takes the cursed treasure to Pope Francis and his council of religious leaders. Note: This episode was dedicated to series music editor Doug Lackey.
214	2	"Fight and Flight"	Josue Cervantes	Jeff Kauffmann	November 14, 2016	BAJN02	0.97
When Steve fails his history midterm, he asks Stan for help with his extra credit project, but Stan's helpfulness begins to irritate Steve when the video project turns into a splashy Hollywood movie starring Vin Diesel and an orangutan. Meanwhile, Klaus and Hayley go after a man who may have stolen Klaus' Ed Hardy shoes and Hayley's Garfield welcome mat they ordered online but never received.
215	3	"The Enlightenment of Ragi-Baba"	Shawn Murray	Joe Chandler & Nic Wegener	November 21, 2016	BAJN03	1.12
Roger falls into a depression after his supermodel/party girl persona gets dropped by her agent on her 28th birthday, so when Hayley introduces him to meditation, Roger quickly becomes Langley Falls' premier master of meditation. Meanwhile, Stan and Steve learn how to make sushi.
216	4	"Portrait of Francine's Genitals"	Rodney Clouden	Steve Hely	November 28, 2016	BAJN04	1.08
When Stan discovers that an abstract painting of Francine's genitalia is displayed in a public museum, he enlists Roger to help him steal it. Meanwhile, Steve loses his sex drive after imagining the painting of Francine's genitals, and decides to dedicate his time into helping Klaus clean his fish bowl.
217	5	"Bahama Mama"	Jansen Yee	Zack Rosenblatt	December 5, 2016	BAJN05	1.10
Stan is rattled about becoming a grandfather after Hayley and Jeff announce they want to have a baby, so he goes to extreme lengths to prevent it from happening. Meanwhile, Steve and Klaus join a Jamaican drug gang, and Roger attempts to live as a lifeguard after getting interested in Baywatch.
218	6	"Roger's Baby"	Joe Daniello	Teresa Hsiao	December 12, 2016	BAJN06	1.16
After Roger reveals that Hayley and Jeff can't have children because the only human body part Jeff has left is his brain (even though the end of the previous episode revealed that Hayley and Jeff can have children, but the child would be a half-alien creature), Roger decides to make Jeff human again by eating Jeff's brain, and soon acts like a pregnant mom. Meanwhile, Steve secretly signs Snot up for Morning Mimosa's "Three Happy Days" makeover that quickly turns bad.
219	7	"Ninety North, Zero West"	Pam Cooke & Valerie Fletcher	Brett Cawley & Robert Maitia	December 19, 2016	BAJN07	1.02
The Smiths must rescue Steve after he is kidnapped and taken to the North Pole. There, Santa Claus is using children to mine for precious stones from the Epic of Gilgamesh that he needs to perform an ancient ritual.
220	8	"Whole Slotta Love"	Chris Bennett	Charles Suozzi	April 10, 2017	BAJN09	0.93
Francine becomes less attracted to Stan when he gets involved with slot car racing. Things get worse when Francine thinks Stan is cheating on her with a younger woman. Meanwhile, Roger becomes a stewardess who performs stand-up comedy, but he ends up getting upstaged by a prettier, funnier flight attendant.
221	9	"The Witches of Langley"	Jansen Yee	Joe Chandler & Nic Wegener	April 17, 2017	BAJN13	0.97
Steve discovers a book of magic spells at a curio shop Roger owns, and he and his friends become Pearl Bailey High's resident witches. Meanwhile, Francine opens up her own funnel cake shop, and Stan and Klaus get into remembering obscure bands from the 1990s.
222	10	"A Nice Night for a Drive"	Josue Cervantes	Sam Brenner	April 24, 2017	BAJN10	1.01
After the veterinarian reveals that Klaus has a life-threatening illness that can only be cured through surgery (which Stan can't pay because he blew his money on a GPS system for his SUV), Klaus has the CIA kill him and transfer his brain into the GPS system. Meanwhile, Roger gets back at Steve and his friends for a lame prank by posing as an angry family man whose wife and kids fear him.
223	11	"Casino Normale"	Shawn Murray	Tim Saccardo	May 1, 2017	BAJN11	0.94
Francine steals a thumb drive from the CIA and pretends to be a super villain to incite Stan to be more seductive. Meanwhile, Roger tricks Hayley and Steve into trapping Jay Leno so he can take revenge.
224	12	"Bazooka Steve"	Rodney Clouden	Joel Hurwitz	May 29, 2017	BAJN12	0.98
Steve becomes the town pariah after he convinces Johnny Concussion, the star quarterback of the Bazooka Sharks arena football team, to quit playing because of head trauma. Meanwhile, Hayley takes a job as a cab driver after unwittingly making a sports bet with Roger.
225	13	"Camp Campawanda"	Tim Parsons & Jennifer Graves	Kirk J. Rudell	June 5, 2017	BAJN08	0.89
Steve is upset when Snot threatens their summer camp fun by becoming a counselor-in-training. Meanwhile, Hayley and Jeff become suspicious of Roger when he organizes a "Burning Man" reenactment for their wedding anniversary.
226	14	"Julia Rogerts"	Joe Daniello	Kathryn Borel	June 12, 2017	BAJN14	0.91
Stan and Roger set out to recreate a rare wine Francine had stashed away and that Stan drank during a binge. During a tornado, Roger runs off as Julia Roberts' character from Sleeping with the Enemy after Stan won't admit that he likes Roger. Meanwhile, Steve plans a meeting when he finds out that Jeff and Barry have never met.
227	15	"The Life and Times of Stan Smith"	Pam Cooke & Valerie Fletcher	Jordan Blum & Parker Deay	July 24, 2017	BAJN15	0.85
Stan becomes addicted to reliving his youth through near-death experiences after Roger uses his electric powers to shock him into having a heart attack. Meanwhile, Klaus takes Steve to Arizona State University for a college visit, and Steve ends up getting hazed by Klaus' old fraternity.
228	16	"The Bitchin' Race"	Jansen Yee	Kirk J. Rudell	July 31, 2017	BAJN21	0.89
In a parody of The Amazing Race, the Smiths compete on the reality show The Bitchin' Race, but after Stan and Hayley ditch the less-motivated Steve and Francine to team up, they end up in a Thai labor camp run by the deranged, diminutive dictator from "CIAPOW".
229	17	"Family Plan"	Chris Bennett	Zack Rosenblatt	August 7, 2017	BAJN17	1.04
After attending Dr. Kalgary's wedding, Francine reconnects with her birth family (the same ones from "Big Trouble in Little Langley" who abandoned her after being told that children aren't allowed in the first-class section of a commercial airplane, only in this episode, her father is still alive while her mom is said to have committed suicide) when she starts craving the experience of having a big family, and ends up running for her life when her father instigates a Hunger Games/Battle Royale-style fight over who gets to be on the family's phone plan. Meanwhile, Stan becomes obsessed with American Pickers.
230	18	"The Long Bomb"	Josue Cervantes	Brett Cawley & Robert Maitia	August 14, 2017	BAJN18	0.93
In this send up of the original Die Hard movie, Stan and Hayley (who haven't been bonding lately) spend the day at a Bazooka Sharks game -- and get tangled in a terrorist plot.
231	19	"Kloger"	Shawn Murray	Teresa Hsiao	August 21, 2017	BAJN19	0.88
Roger and Klaus start having a secret affair after they accidentally end up on an online date together. Meanwhile, Steve tries to get out of doing the Presidential Physical Fitness test, and Hayley poses as a student so she can get her pinkeye checked (as she has no health insurance).
232	20	"Garbage Stan"	Rodney Clouden	Paul Stroud	August 28, 2017	BAJN20	1.00
Stan and Steve open up their own father-son garbage business after Stan inherits his father's old truck. Meanwhile, Roger finds Hayley is a natural at bumper pool and brings her to play with the best player in town.
233	21	"The Talented Mr. Dingleberry"	Tim Parsons & Jennifer Graves	Jeff Kauffmann	September 4, 2017	BAJN16	0.86
Roger poses as a ventriloquist dummy to help Steve win the school talent show, and begins killing the competition. Meanwhile, Stan and Hayley try to make their own honey, but production is sabotaged when Stan puts wasps in the beehive.
234	22	"West to Mexico"	Joe Daniello	Brian Boyle	September 11, 2017	BAJN22	0.86
In this Western-based story, Stan becomes a wanted man running from Roger the bounty hunter, and ends up in a town in need of a good guy to help Principal Lewis (who works as a barber), Francine (who works as a saloon girl), Steve (who works as the saloon's piano player), and Hayley (who is the sole heiress to her family's water well).
