= American Dad! season 19 =

American Dad!
- Season 19
- Promotional poster for the 19th season
- Starring: Seth MacFarlane; Wendy Schaal; Scott Grimes; Rachael MacFarlane; Dee Bradley Baker; Jeff Fischer
- No. of episodes: 22

Release
- Original network: TBS
- Original release: January 24 – December 19, 2022

Season chronology
- ← Previous; Season 18 Next → Season 20

The nineteenth season of American Dad! aired on TBS in twenty-two episodes from January 24, 2022, to December 19, 2022, before being released in syndication on Adult Swim. It premiered with the episode "Langley Dollar Listings" and finished with "The Grounch". The series continues to focus on the eccentric upper middle class Smith family in a fictionalized version of Langley, Virginia and their eight housemates: Father, husband, CIA agent, and Republican, Stan; his wife and housewife, Francine; their liberal, hippie, college-aged daughter, Hayley-Fischer; their dorky high-school-aged son, Steve; the family's unusual goldfish, Klaus; flamboyant, master of disguise alien, Roger; Jeff Fischer, Hayley Smith's stoner husband who resides with the Smith family; And Roger's ex-tumor son Rogu.

Season nineteen contains "Gold Top Nuts", one of the series' most acclaimed episodes.

It had been renewed for seasons 20 and 21.

== Production ==
At Comic-Con 2022, showrunner Matt Weitzman revealed the penultimate episode of Season 19, "Echoes" was intended to serve as the series finale, much in the way that the season 8 episode "Hot Water" was produced, amid the restructuring of Warner Bros. Discovery's content, at the time leaving the show's fate in jeopardy.

== Episodes ==
No. overall	No. in season	Title	Directed by	Written by	Original release date	Prod. code	U.S. viewers (millions)
323	1	"Langley Dollar Listings"	Jennifer Graves	Nic Wegener	January 24, 2022	GAJN01	0.52
Francine and Roger successfully audition to become reality TV realtors, while the other Smiths start a coffee business in their front yard.
324	2	"Dressed Down"	Tim Parsons	Jeff Kauffmann	January 31, 2022	GAJN02	0.47
Stan finds it difficult to dress casually, so one of Roger's personas helps him spice up his wardrobe. Meanwhile, Hayley and Jeff attempt to raise their own chickens after learning that their eggs are factory-farmed.
325	3	"The Book of Fischer"	Chris Bennett	Parker Deay	February 7, 2022	GAJN03	0.40
Stan takes Steve to the barbershop to mingle with his circle of friends, which ends with Stan, Steve, and Tuttle on the run from the Mafia after Stan lets it slip that Tuttle is in witness protection. Meanwhile, Jeff starts journaling after Hayley gets sick of him telling her every little detail about his day, and the journal ends up being the bible to a futuristic religion.
326	4	"A Roger Story"	Josue Cervantes	Joe Chandler	February 14, 2022	GAJN04	0.51
Steve and Snot are forced to stop being friends after some friction forms between their mothers, so they enlist Roger's help.
327	5	"Epic Powder Dump"	Shawn Murray	Tim Saccardo	February 21, 2022	GAJN05	0.61
Stan takes his family out to replicate the ski trips from his childhood. Meanwhile, Klaus harbors a crush on a tech support operator.
328	6	"American Dad Graffito"	John O'Day	Kevin Tyler	February 28, 2022	GAJN06	0.51
Stan discovers that his favorite diner is closing down, and decides to bring the 1950s back to Langley Falls. Meanwhile Sub Hub, Hayley's workplace, plots to build a new location in the diner's place.
329	7	"Beyond the Alcove or: How I Learned to Stop Worrying and Love Klaus"	Jansen Yee	Joel Hurwitz	March 7, 2022	GAJN07	0.49
Klaus gets a new sense of mojo and becomes cool, but it only serves to make Francine jealous as she tries to upstage him.
330	8	"A Song of Knives and Fire"	Joe Daniello	Charles Suozzi	March 14, 2022	GAJN08	0.49
After Stan becomes a firefighter, Francine begins to start fires in order to make his job more exciting. Meanwhile, Roger becomes a knife-thrower. Note: Following Episode #17AJN08 from American Dad!, TBS decided to carry on with American Dad! Episode #17AJN11.)
331	9	"The Curious Case of the Old Hole"	Chris Bennett	Soren Bowie	September 5, 2022	GAJN11	0.43
Wheels and the Legman try to hunt down the perpetrators who destroyed Steve's secret swimming hole. Meanwhile, Klaus helps an aging Principal Lewis reclaim his confidence.
332	10	"Gold Top Nuts"	Jennifer Graves	Brett Cawley & Robert Maitia	September 12, 2022 (Note: This episode was first released on Video On Demand on July 11, 2022 on Amazon.)	GAJN09	0.39
The Smiths return from a difficult, quarrelsome vacation, and end up on a desert island, with no memory of who they are and an obsession with an old commercial for mixed nuts.
333	11	"The Three Fs"	Shawn Murray	Alisha Ketry	September 19, 2022	GAJN13	0.43
Francine's newfound friendship with a frog brings excitement to the whole Smith household. Unfortunately, it drives their neighbor, Greg, crazy.
334	12	"Smooshed: A Love Story"	John O'Day	Nicole Shabtai	September 26, 2022	GAJN14	0.50
Steve goes on a class trip to Philadelphia, where he hopes to fall in love.
335	13	"The Fast and the Spurious"	Joe Daniello	Curtis Cook	October 3, 2022	GAJN16	0.38
Roger is forced to confront himself after a series of car accidents. Meanwhile, Klaus and Jeff bond after the Smiths get blasted into space.
336	14	"A League of His Own"	Josue Cervantes	Sam Brenner	October 10, 2022	GAJN12	0.50
Steve profiles Stan for an essay contest at school, and Hayley tries to break Steve of hero-worshipping his father. Meanwhile, Francine gets trapped in a Port-a-John and stumbles her way around the world.
337	15	"You Are Here"	Tim Parsons	Joe Chandler	October 31, 2022	GAJN18	0.34
Roger and Steve try to save a dying mall; Stan, Hayley, Klaus, and Francine start a food truck.
338	16	"I Heard You Wanna Buy Some Speakers"	Jansen Yee	Paul Stroud	November 7, 2022	GAJN15	0.37
While his parents are away, Barry's dads speakers accidentally get destroyed, leading to Snot forcing Barry to get replacements from Roger. Meanwhile, Stan gets paralyzed trying to do a standing backflip and Steve and Toshi go on Shark Tank.
339	17	"Hayley Was a Girl Scout?"	Jennifer Graves	Yolanda Carney	November 14, 2022	GAJN17	0.36
After a cop arrests Stan for crashing into the CIA sign (like he has been doing during the opening credits since season five), Stan is sentenced to be Hayley's co-leader in her Girl Scout troop. Meanwhile, Steve tries to escape from his mundane, humiliating reality by imagining himself as Merlin the Wizard's personal assistant.
340	18	"Please Please Jeff"	Chris Bennett	Laura Beason	November 21, 2022	GAJN19	0.38
Jeff's people-pleasing nature gets in the way of his relationship with Hayley. Meanwhile, Stan wears a confusing costume to the CIA costume party and, after a head injury in the bathroom, searches for the one person who actually liked and understood it.
341	19	"Jambalaya"	Josue Cervantes	Nic Wegener	November 28, 2022	GAJN20	0.34
Roger turns the Smiths' house into a restaurant that serves jambalaya, against Francine's wishes. Meanwhile Stan and Hayley go on a road trip to stalk a woman on Facebook, and Steve and Klaus write a movie script starring John Cena.
342	20	"Gernot and Strudel"	Shawn Murray	Zack Rosenblatt	December 5, 2022	GAJN21	0.34
Hoping to teach him the value of sharing, the family recreates a television show from Klaus' childhood. Meanwhile, Steve has to keep Roger from doing drugs and get him to his piano recital, but Delmonico (the family's drug dealer who first appeared on "Portrait of Francine's Genitals") has other plans.
343	21	"Echoes"	John O'Day	Jeff Kauffmann	December 12, 2022	GAJN22	0.47
Steve starts a work-study program and discovers a strange secret about the Doppler radar at Channel 3 News. Meanwhile, Roger seeks redemption in the Nashville country music scene.
344	22	"The Grounch"	Tim Parsons	Zack Rosenblatt	December 19, 2022	GAJN10	0.23
In the 19th season finale (and the Christmas/holiday episode of American Dad!), the Smith family find Snot's list of how sexually attractive the family is. After Stan finds out he ranks number one, he sets out to create his own men's magazine, while Roger, upset that he is in last place, becomes so depressed that he gives up sex forever after marrying a woman he met at one of his famous sex parties. But when his new wife leaves him to go to Tuttle's sex party, Roger becomes a Grinch-esque monster out to steal all that is erotic and sexually pleasurable.
