= American Dad! season 18 =

American Dad!
- Season 18
- Promotional poster for the 18th season
- Starring: Seth MacFarlane; Wendy Schaal; Scott Grimes; Rachael MacFarlane; Dee Bradley Baker; Jeff Fischer
- No. of episodes: 22

Release
- Original network: TBS
- Original release: April 19 – October 25, 2021

Season chronology
- ← Previous; Season 17 Next → Season 19

The eighteenth season of the American TV series American Dad! originally aired on TBS from April 19, 2021, to October 25, 2021, and consisted of 22 episodes.

== Production ==
In January 2020, the series was renewed for an eighteenth and nineteenth season.

== Episodes ==
No. overall	No. in season	Title	Directed by	Written by	Original release date	Prod. code	U.S. viewers (millions)
301	1	"Who Smarted?"	Chris Bennett	Jeff Kauffmann	April 19, 2021	FAJN01	0.56
When Jeff starts to feel that his stupidity embarrasses Hayley, he volunteers for a CIA experiment that makes him a genius. Meanwhile, Roger and Steve hunt for snakes so that they can sell their venom.
302	2	"Russian Doll"	Josue Cervantes	Zack Rosenblatt	April 26, 2021	FAJN02	0.60
Stan becomes obsessed with a doll that he's supposed to give to the CIA as part of a Russian recon mission. Meanwhile, Klaus does taxes for Roger's personas and a serial killer is going after the members of Steve's former boy band, B-12.
303	3	"Stan Moves to Chicago"	Shawn Murray	Nic Wegener	May 3, 2021	FAJN03	0.62
Stan quits his job at the CIA and moves to Chicago to kickstart the comedy career he gave up on when he was in college -- and ends up on the Saturday Night Live-esque sketch show Sketches & Laughs as part of a plot to take down popular cast member Colin Jokes.
304	4	"Shakedown Steve"	Rodney Clouden	Tim Saccardo	May 10, 2021	FAJN04	0.56
Steve bonds with Jeff over Jeff's homemade grilled cheese business. Meanwhile, Stan, Francine, Hayley, Roger, and Klaus go to a low-rent escape room and end up living there.
305	5	"Klaus and Rogu in "Thank God for Loose Rocks": An American Dad! Adventure"	Jansen Yee	Joe Chandler	May 17, 2021	FAJN05	0.46
The Smiths vacation at a dude ranch, and Klaus and Rogu try to survive the wilderness.
306	6	"The Wondercabinet"	Joe Daniello	Brett Cawley & Robert Maitia	May 24, 2021	FAJN06	0.48
Steve gets into New Age mysticism after discovering that life as an adult will be nothing but misery and cynicism. Meanwhile, Roger creates a low-budget porn series called "Bang Van".
307	7	"Little Bonnie Ramirez"	Jennifer Graves	Parker Deay	May 31, 2021	FAJN07	0.46
Roger tries to prove to Francine that he can still come up with interesting personas...and puts Francine in prison for abducting a child pageant star. Meanwhile, Stan, Hayley, and Steve go on a cruise with an actress who played Francine in a re-enactment of her allegedly kidnapping the child pageant star.
308	8	"Dancin' A-With My Cell"	Tim Parsons	Charles Suozzi	June 7, 2021	FAJN08	0.60
Stan uses DNA splicing to change his family's personalities. Meanwhile, Roger, Jeff, and Principal Lewis go skiing and end up stuck in an avalanche.
309	9	"Mused and Abused"	Chris Bennett	Sam Brenner	June 14, 2021	FAJN09	0.55
Roger (dressed as Pablo Picasso) uses Klaus' misery to create art. Meanwhile, Stan and Francine seek revenge after receiving a rejection letter from the management behind the Bazooka Sharks.
310	10	"Henderson"	Shawn Murray	Joel Hurwitz	June 21, 2021	FAJN11	0.63
A man whom Stan believes is his imaginary friend returns to collect a debt. Meanwhile, Klaus has a big date with Danuta and calls upon Jeff to upgrade his fishbowl.
311	11	"Hot Scoomp"	John O'Day	Nicole Shabtai	June 28, 2021	FAJN12	0.52
Upset that Francine doesn't care about her hopes and dreams, Hayley gets stoned and ends up enrolling in an exercise class that turns out to be a cult.
312	12	"Lumberjerk"	Joe Daniello	Paul Stroud	July 5, 2021	FAJN14	0.60
Stan is forced to be partners with Jeff in a lumberjack contest, while Steve, Francine, and Snot try to win a vintage pickup truck in a contest.
313	13	"Stan & Francine & Stan & Francine & Radika"	Jennifer Graves	Steve Hely	July 12, 2021	FAJN15	0.60
Stan and Francine go back in time to the 1990s to settle an argument, and the two end up falling for their past selves, until present-day Stan decides that his life would be better off if he married their Indian roommate, Radika.
314	14	"Flush After Reading"	Tim Parsons	Laura Beason	July 19, 2021	FAJN16	0.51
To cover up a secret shame, Francine hides out in the library to use the library's bathroom, and uses Roger's powers to go inside the books she's reading. Meanwhile, Klaus faces a crisis from being lonely, but when he scores a date, she dumps him for lying in his profile.
315	15	"Comb Over: A Hair Piece"	Chris Bennett	Brett Cawley & Robert Maitia	July 26, 2021	FAJN17	0.55
Stan calls upon Roger's hairstylist persona to help him with his baldness (last mentioned in the episode "Chimdale").
316	16	"Plot Heavy"	Jansen Yee	Soren Bowie	August 2, 2021 (Note: This episode was first released on Video On Demand on July 6, 2021, the day after the episode was originally scheduled to air.)	FAJN13	0.42
The family turns their backyard into a cemetery, but Klaus ends up recruiting Stan to have the backyard turned into a poolside bar.
317	17	"The Sinister Fate!!"	Josue Cervantes	Jeff Kauffmann	August 9, 2021	FAJN18	0.50
Hayley becomes concerned that she's becoming her mother, so she finds solace in an elderly friend, named Eunice, who has a twisted secret. Meanwhile, Steve, Snot, Barry, and Toshi take part in Roger's improv troupe.
318	18	"Dr. Sunderson's SunSuckers"	Shawn Murray	Nic Wegener	August 16, 2021	FAJN19	0.59
Hayley and Jeff struggle to promote the use of renewable energy, so they join a solar company run by one of Roger's personas.
319	19	"Family Time"	John O'Day	Zack Rosenblatt	August 23, 2021	FAJN20	0.56
Stan takes the family to dinner at a buffet restaurant that ends up being a trap by CIA scientist, Dr. Weitzman. Meanwhile, Roger escapes from his stressful life by becoming a flower, only to be taken by a flower-gathering company and bought by a woman who's cheating on her husband.
320	20	"Cry Baby"	Jansen Yee	Joe Chandler	August 30, 2021	FAJN21	0.52
Stan realizes he can't cry, so he tries to learn empathy from Steve. Meanwhile, Roger tries to remedy his air conditioner business with a nicely worded email.
321	21	"Crystal Clear"	Joe Daniello	Parker Deay	September 6, 2021	FAJN22	0.46
Stan tries to impress Toshi's father after spending a day at his house. Meanwhile, Klaus and Jeff go vacationing in the countryside and Klaus tries to get invited to his friend's bachelor party.
322	22	"Steve's Franken Out"	Josue Cervantes	Alisha Ketry	October 25, 2021	FAJN10	0.37
Steve attempts to save Pearl Bailey High's science club by creating a Frankenstein-esque replica of Principal Lewis. Meanwhile, Langley Falls' drinking water is tainted after Octaduel (Roger's oil company from "Kiss Kiss, Cam Cam") leaks formaldehyde into the town's water supply.
