= Virtual In-Stanity =

- American Dad! episode
- Episode no.: Season 7 Episode 5
- Directed by: Shawn Murray
- Written by: Jordan Blum; Parker Deay
- Production code: 6AJN16
- Original air date: November 20, 2011

Guest appearances
- Sarah Michelle Gellar as Phyllis; Alyson Hannigan as Chelsea; David Koechner as Dick

Episode chronology
← Previous "The Worst Stan"	Next → "The Scarlett Getter"
- American Dad! season 7

"Virtual In-Stanity" is the fifth episode of the seventh season on the animated comedy series American Dad!. It aired on Fox in the United States on November 20, 2011. The episode plot mainly revolves around Stan making a desperate attempt to bond with his son, Steve by creating an avatar in the form of a teenage girl.

This episode was written by Jordan Blum and Parker Deay and directed by Shawn Murray. This episode generally received positive reviews.

== Plot ==
While playing poker with the guys, Stan observes Dick trying out his African-American avatar "Black Dick" to work out some frustration from losing. Dick does this by entering a virtual reality machine and, hooked up to sensors, dictates the movements of an android. Francine calls and warns Stan that he is about to miss Steve's birthday yet again. Stan rushes home with a stuffed rabbit full of cocaine from evidence as a gift. Over home movies, Stan realizes he is not in any of them because he was always busy with other things. After Steve brushes off an invitation to a baseball game with Stan, Stan starts worrying that he may miss out on a chance to bond with Steve. Stan makes a desperate attempt to bond with his son by creating a busty blonde bombshell avatar, Phyllis, whom he sends Steve’s way. When Steve wants their relationship to become more physical, Stan begins to feel uncomfortable with carrying out these deeds and evades them. Steve soon feels the relationship is going nowhere and decides to take a girl named Chelsea to the school dance instead.

In desperation, Stan makes an offer through Phyllis to have sex with Steve if he goes to the school dance with her. Steve happily agrees and ditches Chelsea. On the night of the dance, upon learning what her husband is up to when she arrives at the CIA building, Francine attempts to intervene. Unable to get into the avatar chamber, Francine takes a power lift mecha to the school to pin Phyllis down while Steve is in the bathroom preparing himself. Convinced by Francine that he should accept his life with Steve the way it is, Stan has Phyllis break up with Steve. When Steve attempts to hook up with Chelsea again, he finds she is no longer interested in him and runs home where he gets comforted by Stan. Though Francine points that he caused the grief for his son, Stan is more focused on the fact that he was there for Steve.

Meanwhile, Roger steals a limo and starts his limo service to accomplish his dream of driving people slightly more privileged than himself to various locations. Klaus joins the venture to accomplish his dream of accompanying people with slightly more specific dreams than his. But when a group of disrespectful fraternity boys "drive and dash", ignoring their antics in the hope of being paid 20 dollars, Roger goes on a murderous manhunt to get his revenge, starting with one of the boys almost immediately. Klaus is horrified that Roger would kill 5 people over 20 dollars, Roger reminds him that last week, he killed 6 people over 19 dollars. Roger later runs down 2 others at his 1st victim's funeral, then the 4th while he is in a bathroom stall in a bowling alley. The last survivor tries to flee on an airplane, only to look out the window in mid-flight to see Roger's limo on the plane's wing. Roger runs him down as well, causing the plane and limo to explode and killing almost everyone on board. As he and Klaus pass a surviving flight attendant in a parachute, getting addicted to his murderous bloodlust, Roger kills her by undoing her chute before he and Klaus crash land in their parachutes. At the very end of the episode, Dick uses the "Black Dick" avatar to purchase XXX-S condoms, and worries they may be too big.

== Production ==
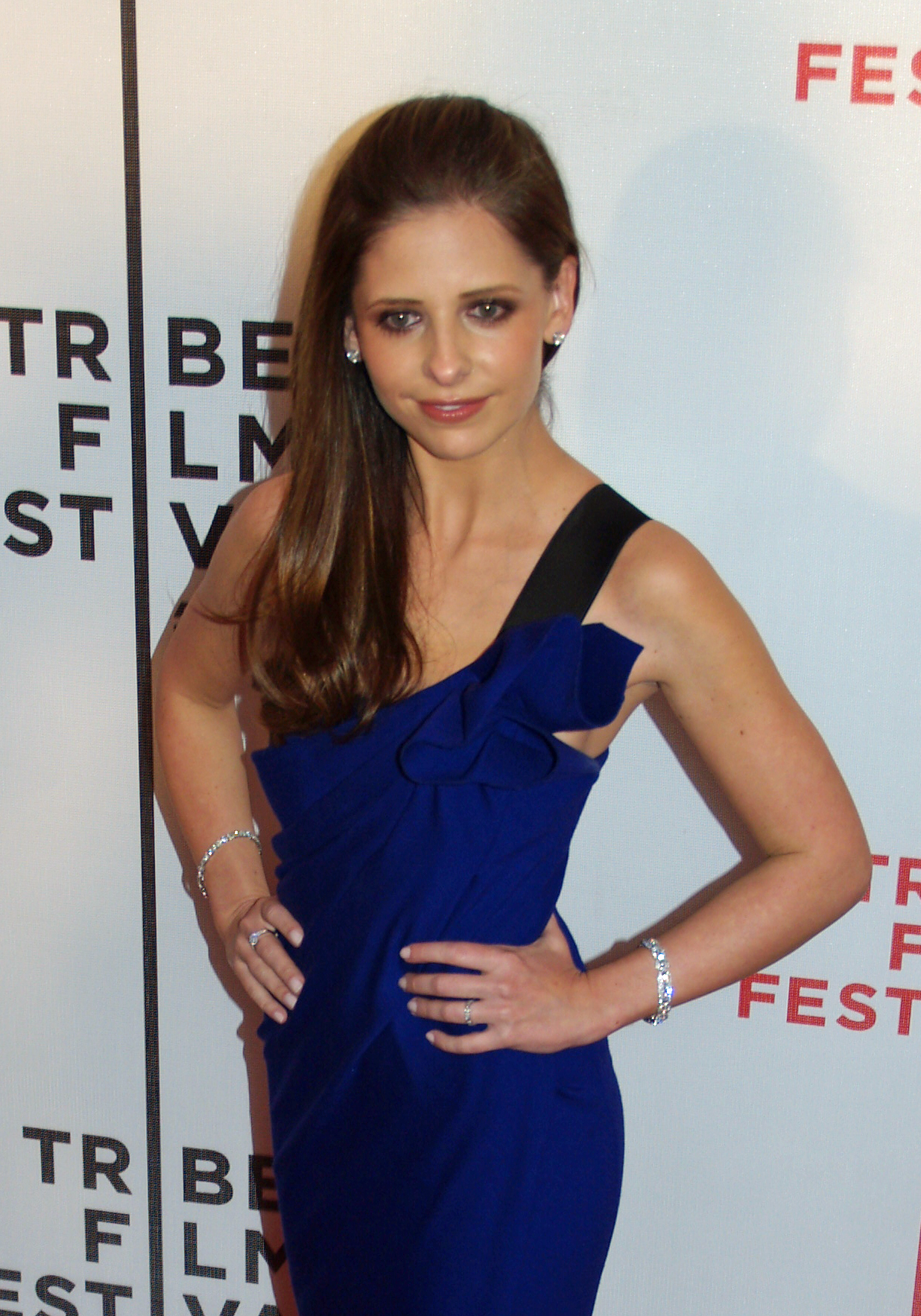
Sarah Michelle Gellar guest starred in this episode as Phyllis.

The episode title is a play on the English acid jazz and funk band Jamiroquai song, "Virtual Insanity", which, in turn, is a reverse reference to "virtual reality". This episode was written by Jordan Blum and Parker Deay and directed by Shawn Murray. Seth MacFarlane, the creator and executive producer of American Dad!, as well as its sister shows Family Guy and The Cleveland Show, served as the executive producer for the episode, along with series veterans Mike Barker, Rick Wiener, Matt Weitzman, and Kenny Schwartz. In addition to the regular cast, Sarah Michelle Gellar guest starred in the episode. Also appearing in this episode was Gellar's former co-star Alyson Hannigan. David Koechner, who appeared in The Office and Saturday Night Live, reprises his role of Dick Reynolds in this episode.

== Reception ==
Rowan Kaiser from The A.V. Club gave the episode an A−, saying: "American Dad generally resisted the impulse to pander, with the possible exception of Francine climbing into an exo-suit and saying 'Stay away from him, you bitch!' This meant the episode managed to focus on doing what American Dad! does best – being funny. It's a great episode for fans of Roger, Stan, Francine, and Steve, which I'm pretty sure encompasses pretty much every American Dad! fan."

Dyanamaria Leifsson of TV Equals gave the episode a positive review, saying "Even though the reality of what was happening in both story lines was actually quite sick and twisted, I enjoyed this episode of American Dad!. Putting aside the fact that Stan was trying to seduce his son in exchange for quality father-son time and the fact that Roger was murdering guys for what amounted to $4 per person, I thought the premise was clever and there were a ton of great laughs throughout." The episode was watched by a total of 4.82 million people, this made it the third most watched show on Animation Domination that night, beating The Cleveland Show and Allen Gregory but losing to The Simpsons and Family Guy with 6.02 million.
