= The Scarlett Getter =

- American Dad! episode
- Episode no.: Season 8 Episode 6
- Directed by: Josue Cervantes
- Written by: Matt Fusfeld; Alex Cuthbertson
- Production code: 6AJN09
- Original air date: November 27, 2011

Guest appearances
- Sharon Lawrence as Scarlett Reynolds; Shannon Sharpe as himself

Episode chronology
← Previous "Virtual In-Stanity"	Next → "Season's Beatings"
- American Dad! season 8

"The Scarlett Getter" is the sixth episode of the eighth season of the animated comedy series American Dad!. It aired on Fox in the United States on November 27, 2011. The episode plot mainly revolves around Francine, who accidentally leads Roger to a dangerous alien hunter while trying to get revenge on Stan.

This episode was written by Matt Fusfeld and Alex Cuthbertson and directed by Josue Cervantes. This episode generally received positive reviews. It features guest performances from Sharon Lawrence and Shannon Sharpe, as well as several recurring voice actors and actresses from the series.

== Plot ==
Deputy Director Bullock announces they are bringing in Shannon Sharpe, a specialist, to catch their previously escaped alien. When Stan meets with Roger at Coughy's Coffee Shop to warn him, he spots Scarlett Reynolds, an old CIA boot camp crush. When Roger takes notice of her good looks and suggests the idea of taking her out, which Stan rudely dismisses. Instead, Stan invites Scarlett over to the house for dinner. During dinner, Francine is annoyed with Stan mooning over Scarlett and heads to Roger's Place for a drink. When Francine finds out that Roger is also irritated with Stan, she suggests he put on a charming persona and break up the couple. When "Dan Ansom Handsome" arrives downstairs, Scarlett appears charmed much to Stan's annoyance. Roger gives Stan an ultimatum of Scarlett or Francine, insisting that he will have sex with the one Stan rejects. Stan reluctantly agrees not to interfere with Roger and Scarlett.

Stan reneges on his promise and attempts to break up Roger and Scarlett, further strengthening Roger's resolve to have sex with Scarlett to prove Stan wrong. Stan decides to tip off Shannon about Roger and takes him to the ski chalet Roger had taken her. Francine arrives to find movers hauling Roger's stuff out as Klaus tells her about Stan's plans to turn Roger over, and Klaus plans on taking Roger's attic. At the ski chalet, Stan and Shannon arrive only to find Scarlett alone. Shannon reveals to Stan that Scarlett is a rival alien hunter who also had been tracking Roger. Scarlett shoots Shannon and ties Stan to a chair, preparing to kill him. Before doing so, she reveals to Stan that she ran into him at the coffee shop on purpose because she knew all along that he was harbouring an alien and that she never saw him, even back at CIA boot camp, as anything worthwhile. Scarlett prepares to shoot Stan when Francine arrives and shoots her instead. Scarlett rolls into the fireplace and her body bursts into flame, immediately becoming a pile of ashes. Stan and Francine find Roger tied to a bed, having been vivisected, which he first mistook for kinky sex. They scramble to restore Roger's body and after he's restored, Roger and Stan apologize for taunting each other. As they leave, Stan places a knife in Shannon's hand and tilts a picture on the wall to make it look like a suicide. When the police detectives arrive, they figure that Shannon shot himself, tilted the picture, grabbed a knife, and died.

Meanwhile, when in a rush to catch the school bus, Steve accidentally grabs a pair of Hayley's panties from the dryer. Steve is struck with good luck at school, which appears to be confirmed when he scratches lottery tickets with Klaus and wins. At school, during a game of dodgeball in gym class, the panties continue to work their magic, but after showering, Steve returns to his locker to find them missing and spots Snot running out the door. Almost immediately, bad luck returns to him. Steve tries to go to Snot's house to get them back, but Snot refuses to come out. Steve tells Hayley about the panties, and she convinces him that the luck was within him all along and had nothing to do with the panties. However, she goes to Snot's house, where she finds him in the bathtub, basking in the glow of her panties by candlelight. She beats him up and takes back her panties, which she acknowledges are her lucky pair.

== Production ==
This episode was written by Matt Fusfeld and Alex Cuthbertson and directed by Josue Cervantes. Seth MacFarlane, the creator and executive producer of American Dad!, as well as its sister shows Family Guy and The Cleveland Show, served as the executive producer for the episode, along with series veterans Mike Barker, Rick Wiener, Matt Weitzman, and Kenny Schwartz. In addition to the regular cast, Sharon Lawrence and Shannon Sharpe guest starred in the episode. Recurring voice actors Curtis Armstrong, Elizabeth Banks, Mike Barker, Mike Henry, David Koechner, Teri Lyn Rodriguez, Patrick Stewart, Alec Sulkin, Daisuke Suzuki, Eddie Kaye Thomas, and John Viener made minor appearances as well.

== Reception ==
Rowan Kaiser from The A.V. Club gave the episode an A, saying: "Perhaps the most surprising thing about "The Scarlett Getter" is that the big guest star, Shannon Sharpe, fit in perfectly. There was an initial awkward "The football guy Shannon Sharpe???" which turned into a horrific pun joke, but overall, the extroverted Sharpe made perfect sense for a ridiculous alien bounty hunter, and made it work. One of the weird things about discussing American Dad right now is that the production and airing orders are so hopelessly confused that it's difficult to tell if American Dad is on a hot streak or if it's just getting lucky. The presence of Hayley, but not Jeff, in this episode seems to imply that it's from before the wedding at the start of Season 6, so perhaps this episode was produced two years ago, and last week's also-great episode was produced two months ago. Or vice versa. So I'd love to sit here and say "American Dad is fantastic this season!" but it's possibly that Fox is just burning off episodes it thinks aren't any good... which would be ridiculous, because yeah, whatever the production order of these, American Dad is really good right now.

Dyanamaria Leifsson of TV Equals gave the episode a positive review, saying "There were so many great moments and absurd lines peppered throughout this episode of American Dad that it’s tough to cover them all. Although there were a lot of the typical slapstick American Dad comedy bits, some of the writing was subtle enough that I feel like I could go back and watch this episode again and pick up a ton of gags that I missed the first time around." The episode was watched by a total of 4.82 million people, this made it the third most watched show on Animation Domination that night, beating Allen Gregory and The Cleveland Show but losing to Family Guy and The Simpsons with 5.61 million.
