= Ricky Spanish =

- American Dad! episode
- Episode no.: Season 8 Episode 17
- Directed by: Shawn Murray
- Written by: Erik Sommers
- Production code: 7AJN02
- Original air date: May 6, 2012

Guest appearances
- Wayne Brady as Tungee; Rose Byrne as Jenny, the whispering voice; Werner Herzog as the narrator; John DiMaggio as Daniel

Episode chronology
← Previous "The Kidney Stays in the Picture"	Next → "Toy Whorey"
- American Dad! season 8

"Ricky Spanish" is the seventeenth episode of the eighth season of the animated comedy series American Dad!. It aired on Fox in the United States on May 6, 2012. The episode plot mainly revolves around Roger rediscovering his alter-ego "Ricky Spanish" and Steve helping Roger's alter-ego make amends with everyone he has wronged.

This episode was written by Erik Sommers and directed by Shawn Murray. This episode generally received positive reviews; Kevin McFarland from The A.V. Club rated this episode a B. It features guest performances from Werner Herzog, Rose Byrne and Wayne Brady, as well as several recurring voice actors and actresses from the series.

== Plot ==
After a pack of caterpillars chew holes in most of Roger's disguises, Roger rediscovers an outfit in the back of the closet. He puts it on excitedly, unable to recall the persona to which it belongs, only to discover that when he walks through town, he draws stares of hatred, culminating in an assault at the hands of Brian Lewis. Roger is reminded that the persona is Ricky Spanish, the most hated man in town. Roger goes into hiding and has Steve bring him another outfit, then on the way home he tells Steve that Ricky was the worst persona he ever created, and that he has earned the hatred of every single person in Langley Falls in one way or another. Using one of the caterpillars he placed into a jar as a metaphor for changing, Steve convinces Roger to let him help Ricky try to correct all the wrong he has done.

Roger and Steve go first to Brian's houseboat, where Brian recalls how Ricky knocked him out and left him penniless and without ID in Tijuana. Next, they go to Bullock's house, where Ricky has to remind a coked-up Bullock of how he killed his wife. Both Brian and Bullock forgive him, though Brian only does so as he is on "way too many antipsychotics". Next on the list is Daniel, a former partner-in-crime who Ricky let take the fall in a sweater heist. After getting Daniel out of jail, Steve stops Daniel from killing Roger/Ricky on the spot, insisting that he has changed. Later, at a Burger Joint, Roger secretly reveals to Daniel that he has another heist plan and that Steve will take the fall for this one.

Borrowing Brian Lewis' houseboat and guns from Bullock, they arrive at the docks where Steve learns of the plan and is knocked out by Daniel. Steve comes to after a short time and tries to stop them, but the guards are alerted and give chase. When Steve starts to fall from a stack of shipping containers, he is caught by Roger, who steals his wallet before letting him drop and be beaten by the guards below, and Ricky and Daniel take off. Steve spends time in prison before being freed by Stan and Francine, while the butterfly in the jar emerges but dies in captivity. Werner Herzog narrates the final scene, and a title card stating 'A Werner Herzog Film' appears.

Meanwhile, Stan and Francine are in for a surprise when Tungee, their sponsored child from Africa shows up on their doorstep. While unsure if he was real, they sent encouraging letters inviting him to live with them. His enthusiastic attitude leads them to ditch Tungee at a Costgo. Still, once home, they regret what they have done and rush back, reuniting with Tungee in a psychedelic sequence and promising never to leave him again. On the ride home, Tungee's perkiness immediately begins to annoy them once more, and they leap out of the car, allowing it to roll down the road with Tungee still inside, staring in horror from the rear window. Stan and Francine immediately begin to miss Tungee once again.

== Production ==
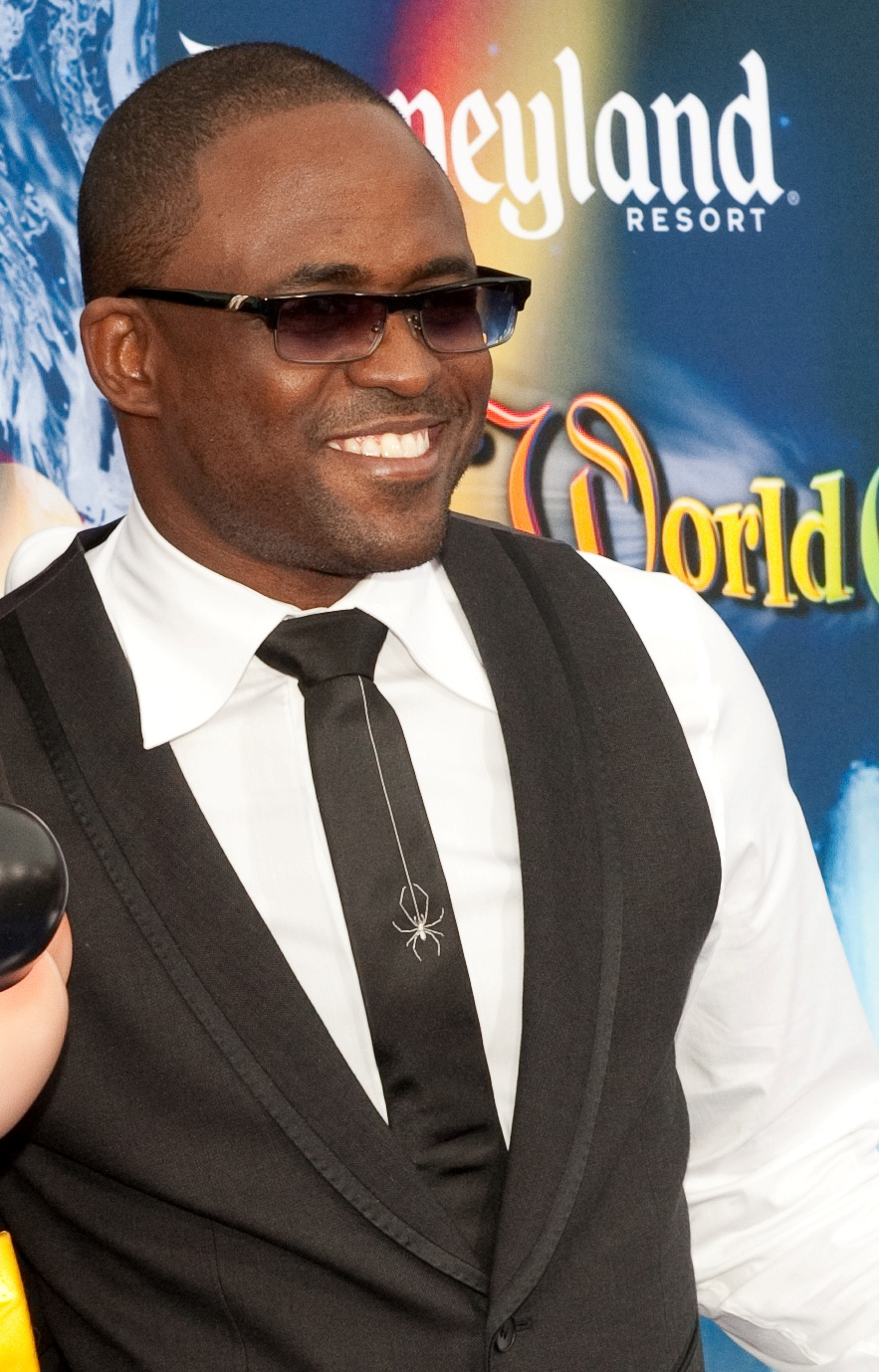
Wayne Brady (pictured) guest starred in this episode as Tungee.

This episode was written by Erik Sommers and directed by Shawn Murray. Seth MacFarlane, the creator and executive producer of American Dad!, as well as its sister shows Family Guy and The Cleveland Show, served as the executive producer for the episode, along with series veterans Mike Barker, Rick Wiener, Matt Weitzman, and Kenny Schwartz. In addition to the regular cast, John DiMaggio, JB Smoove, Nick Kroll, Rose Byrne, Werner Herzog, and Wayne Brady guest starred in the episode. Recurring voice actors Elizabeth Banks, Mike Barker, Mike Henry, Patrick Stewart and John Viener made minor appearances as well.

== Reception ==
"Ricky Spanish" first aired on May 6, 2012, in the United States as part of the animated television night on Fox. Like most of the season, the episode was last in the animation television line-up. It was preceded by episodes of The Simpsons, Bob's Burgers, and its sister shows Family Guy and The Cleveland Show. This episode was watched by 4.82 million U.S. viewers, with a 2.3/6 rating share in the 18–49 demographic group.

The episode received generally positive reviews. Kevin McFarland of The A.V. Club gave the episode a B, saying: "The final few minutes are fantastic, as the episode takes a wild leap and becomes a Werner Herzog documentary, with split screen comparisons and soothing, whimsical narration from the famed filmmaker. Steve is like the butterfly, but survives and gets out. Sure, it’s a tacked-on, completely ridiculous way to punt an actual ending, but it’s also really funny. Not every episode of American Dad will pack an emotional wallop, and this was a light, breezy romp through Roger’s penchant for dress-up that had plenty of laughs and nothing egregiously grating." Dyanamaria Leifsson of TV Equals gave this episode a positive review saying: "Like many episodes of American Dad, tonight’s episode ended on a dark note. The beautiful butterfly that Steve had been protecting emerged from its cocoon only to wilt and die in a jar at sea; a muscular Steve emerged from his prison cell filled with rage and hatred; and Tungee was forever lost to the Smiths after they abandoned him in the back of their running car. Despite the rather depressing story endings, the episode overall was still very funny. The Werner Herzog bit at the end was fantastic and completely unexpected and in retrospect, it kind of put the entire episode into a new light."
