= What Great Advancements! =

- American Dad! episode
- Episode no.: Season 21; Episode 22
- Directed by: Jennifer Graves
- Written by: Brett Cawley & Robert Maitia
- Production code: JAJN19
- Original air date: March 24, 2025

Episode chronology
← Previous "Guardian"	Next → "Aw Rats, A Pool Party"
- American Dad! season 21

"What Great Advancements!" is the twenty-second episode and season finale of the twenty-first season of American Dad!, and the 388th episode overall. The episode aired on March 24, 2025, and is the final episode of the show to premiere on the television network TBS, having aired new episodes of the show since 2014 after its original run on Fox had concluded. The episode was written by Brett Cawley and Robert Maitia, and was directed by Jennifer Graves. The episode is inspired by English filmmaker and comic actor Charlie Chaplin, in an alternate universe where Stan invents sound, but his rise to fame and success leads to rivals trying to copy his invention and eventually leading to the creation of color. The episode received positive reviews from critics.

== Plot ==
=== Setting ===
American Dad! typically centers around CIA agent Stan Smith and his household, consisting of his wife Francine, daughter Hayley, son Steve, pet fish Klaus, and grey alien co-resident Roger as they go on various misadventures in and around a fictionalized version of Langley, Virginia. "What Great Advancements!" largely does away with this setting; the characters have fairly different personalities and backgrounds (for example, Stan is not a CIA agent but a farmer/business magnate) and are mostly portrayed as initial strangers to each other, with the episode taking place in an unnamed locale.

=== Story ===
In a world devoid of both color and sound, Stan is an aspiring inventor who lives with his mother, Betty, on a farm, doing farm work during the day and working on his inventions at night. One night, Betty sees him working on an invention and, recognizing his ambition, trades her prized quilt for a donkey so that Stan may ride it to the city. He attempts to sell his inventions to various companies, including "Roger Co.," but is rejected by all of them. In need of work, Stan finds employment at a factory owned by Bullock, where Hayley and Steve are attempting to convince their fellow workers to unionize. After choking on a cockroach in his soup, Stan is inspired to create a "throat bug" that allows the user to talk. He demonstrates his invention at the factory, thus introducing sound to the world.

One year later, Stan's invention has made him an extremely wealthy businessman, though other companies have also begun selling throat bugs. He marries Bullock's lover, Francine, though she is mainly attracted to his wealth. During a board meeting, Stan's second-in-command Klaus tells him that he has sixty percent of the market share in throat bugs; Stan demands that the board find a way to give him a total monopoly, reasoning that his mother would not want him to "be less than a total success." Meanwhile, he has to contend with a strike led by Hayley and Steve, as well as other companies attempting to gain information on a new invention he is to unveil in a few days.

When it is time to unveil his new invention, Stan remarks that people have not been putting the gift of sound to good use, particularly singling out his board's sycophancy, the strike, and other companies making money off his designs. He shows his new invention: a prism that can grant anything color. He states that he will only sell colorization as a service and gloats that the invention has made him a "god," but is shot shortly afterwards. The prism rolls out of his hands and is picked up by Francine, who escapes with Bullock. Stan pursues them with a zeppelin before attempting to grab the prism out of Bullock's hands with an extendable claw. Roger takes the prism with a claw of his own, but the claw falls apart as he reels it in, with the prism falling into the shanty town Hayley and Steve live in, where they find it. The two run into the city's gigantic "Self-Made Man" statue and place the prism inside its prominent lantern, activating it and colorizing the world.

With his invention now out of his control, Stan loses his company and fortune. Betty comes to the city and brings him back to the farm as he laments that he failed her by losing his money. Betty reveals that she shot Stan for being a "bad boy." As the two arrive at the now-colorized farm, Stan remarks that it is "beautiful" and that although he misses his wealth and wife, "this is nice."

== Production ==
Speculation of American Dad!'s cancellation from TBS had circulated since 2023 following concerns from the write-offs and cancellations that had occurred at Warner Bros. Discovery, especially due to comments from series co-creator Matt Weitzman, stating "It could end at any time. I'm ready for it to end today, if they pull the plug." Previously, attempts were made to cancel the show's 20th and 21st season renewals it received from TBS in December 2021, prior to the merger of WBD predecessors WarnerMedia (owner of TBS) and Discovery, Inc., but these attempts had failed. It was revealed on March 21, 2025, that TBS had cancelled the series and that the final episode to premiere on the show's second network run would air on March 24, 2025, although following its cancellation, reruns would continue to air on TBS, as well as its sister networks TruTV and Adult Swim through 2030. It was announced later that day as reported by Variety that Fox, the show's original network, had retrieved the broadcast rights and gave the show a 4-season renewal all the way to a 25th season and bringing it to the 2028–29 television season.

== Reception ==
=== Viewing figures ===
The episode's premiere gained 242 thousand viewers in its initial broadcast.

=== Critical reception ===
John Schwarz of Bubbleblabber.com rated the episode a 9 out of 10, praising the episode's humor and style, stating "The show opens and I'm thinking 'there's no friggin' way they are doing THIS for 22-minutes' and I was right but I was still very surprised with just how long writers Brett Cawley & Robert Maitia kept up with the throwback Fleisher Cartoons-look of the episode coupled with a silent film mystique that kept the episode voiceless for nearly two-and-a-half acts. Had the show went the entirety and just kept with the silent episode I think this could've been a perfect score because the BALLS these producers would have shown on the very last TBS episode to go voiceless would have been legendary. Instead, we get an almost Pleasantville meets steam punk effort that was actually supposed to be the penultimate season finale with 'Guardian' debuting this week. Moreover, the episode was clearly written/produced during the time of the Hollywood strikes because you can see a number of sight gags during the crowd protests which helped make this episode extra unique and weird which is exactly the way I like my American Dad on TBS".

The Avocado reflected on the episode as a bittersweet ending to the series' 11-year-long run on TBS.
