= Surro-Gate =

- American Dad! episode
- Episode no.: Season 4 Episode 7
- Directed by: Tim Parsons
- Written by: Erik Durbin
- Production code: 3AJN07
- Original air date: December 2, 2007

Guest appearances
- Jane Lynch as Al; Leisha Hailey as Lily; Mary Jo Catlett as Guest #1

Episode chronology
← Previous "42-Year-Old Virgin"	Next → "The Most Adequate Christmas Ever"
- American Dad! season 4

"Surro-Gate" is the seventh episode of the fourth season of the American animated television series American Dad!. It originally aired on Fox in the United States on December 2, 2007. In the episode, Stan is enraged to hear the news that Greg and Terry are planning to start a family through IVF, and that Francine has agreed to be their surrogate. The idea for "Surro-Gate" was inspired from executive producer Kenny Schwartz, who had a child through IVF during the episode's production. The episode received mixed to negative reviews from critics, who criticized the episode's humor as "severely unfunny".

"Surro-Gate" was written by Erik Durbin and directed by Tim Parsons. Guest stars in the episode include Jane Lynch, Leisha Hailey, and Mary Jo Catlett, as well as several recurring guest voice actors and actresses for the series.

== Plot ==
Stan and Francine Smith are informed by Greg and Terry, their gay neighbors, that they plan on having a baby through IVF, causing anger amongst Stan. The pair soon come into a problem, however, as they cannot find a surrogate mother they can agree on, until Francine volunteers and secretly becomes pregnant with their child. She does not tell Stan, even though she promised the unborn child she would eventually. Stan eventually finds out (six months into the pregnancy), and while he is at first furious, Hayley reminds him that the baby is there. All he can do is do what is best for the baby instead of thinking of himself. Soon Francine goes into labor, and she, Stan, Greg and Terry rush to the hospital, where she delivers a baby girl.

Stan soon kidnaps the baby, and goes on a cross-country drive to Nebraska, where gay couples do not have parental rights, so that the baby (whom he names "Liberty Belle") can have a "normal family". Stan and Liberty soon find themselves fleeing from gay-rights activists trying to stop them from reaching the state border, only finding support in the local bystanders he comes across. They are rescued by Lily, a woman on a quad bike, who takes them to her home. Stan is impressed by Lily's two polite, well-behaved children (Jason and Mary), until he meets Lily's wife Allison. The pair explains they are a lesbian couple who decided to bring him to their home to show him that a gay family can be stable and hopefully convince him to return baby Liberty to her parents. Stan, however, abducts their two children and steals their truck. After realizing the error of his ways, Stan tries to apologize, but Greg and Terry punch him and put a restraining order on him as punishment for kidnapping their new baby.

Meanwhile, Steve and Roger play a joke on Klaus by throwing him in his bowl down a water slide, and Klaus swears horrible revenge on them. As a result, they grow paranoid and live in the attic for the 9 months in which the episode takes place. The pair begs for Klaus' forgiveness only to find out he has forgotten the incident, and he vows vengeance upon them again.

== Themes ==
"Surro-Gate" explores themes of homophobia, being done primarily through Stan. The episode's main target for ridicule is Stan's conservative tendencies, and his preconceived notions about homosexual parents having children. Stan's stereotype-based behavior is shown to be irrational and groundless throughout the episode, using him as a medium to tackle the, at the time, hot button issue of gay people's rights to have children. His inability to accept his neighbors decision to have a baby is also mocked through his fickleness when it comes to accepting his gay neighbors. Stan has accepted his gay neighbors in previous episodes, notably Lincoln Lover, but he still continues to reject their lifestyle in "Surro-Gate". The episode's conclusion of Stan finally accepting their decision, and homosexual people as a whole, shows his growth to act more liberal towards the subject.

The episode also challenges surrogacy, along with in vitro fertilization, using Francine and the Smith's openly homosexual neighbors Greg and Terry to convey both, respectively. Francine's decision to carry Greg and Terry's child acts as a way to create discourse between her tolerant ways and Stan's conservative beliefs. Greg is frightened at the thought of having a child, shown frequently near the episode's start. His ideology that he isn't ready for children clashes with Terry, who takes full advantage of the situation to show his strong character and gets ready for the baby's arrival over the course of the episode. Their jarring ways to approach the baby is used as grounds for Stan to slowly accept their decision, coming in to help them both prepare, and for him to nurture Francine, despite him subsequently resorting back to his homophobic ways in the second act of the episode and kidnapping the baby.

== Production ==
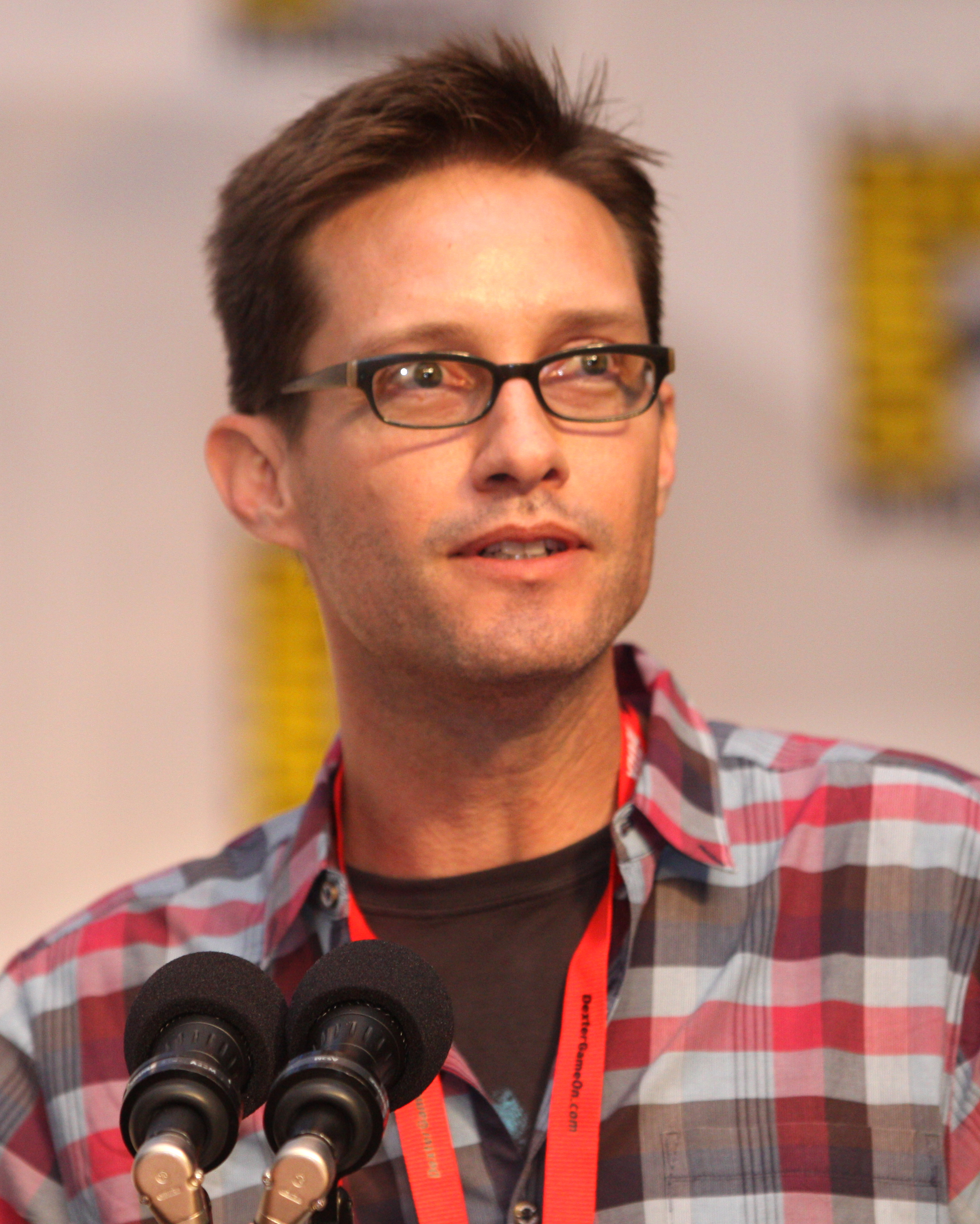
Mike Barker notes that censors took offense to the use of the word "retarded".

"Surro-Gate" was written by Erik Durbin and directed by Tim Parsons. In the DVD commentary for the episode, Nahnatchka Khan notes that the idea for Greg and Terry to have a baby through IVF was inspired from executive producer Kenny Schwartz, who had two children through IVF around the time of the episode's production. Kenny had helped the writers make sure the episode was accurate in its portrayal of the process. Mike Barker notes that during production of the episode, the standards made the writers change the word "mentally retarded" to "slow" for being "offensive", as Mike puts it. Mike Barker also notes that for Terry and Greg's quick dance sequence, the team had to secure the rights for "Jet Song" from West Side Story to play in the background, which they were eventually granted. The episode's plot takes place over the course of nine months, beginning in winter. The writers made sure to focus on what seasons the episode took place in, as they believed people's emotions differentiate during certain seasons.

Matt Weitzman notes that the sequence where Greg holds a camera and runs from the house was difficult to animate, as it required them to make an accurate shaky camera effect. In addition to the regular cast, actresses Jane Lynch, Leisha Hailey, and Mary Jo Catlett guest starred in the episode. The episode contains several references to popular culture. In the sequence of Greg and Terry dance fighting, the accompanying music is "Jet Song" from West Side Story, with their dance sequence also being taken directly from the movie. The sub-plot of Roger and Steve having a mental breakdown, notably the parts taking place in the attic, acts as a reference to the mental unraveling of Howard Hughes.

== Reception ==
"Surro-Gate" was first broadcast on December 2, 2007, as part of the animated television line-up on Fox. It was preceded by reruns of The Simpsons, King of the Hill, and its sister show Family Guy. It was viewed by 6.48 million homes during its initial airing, according to the Nielson ratings, despite airing simultaneously with Cold Case on CBS and The Oprah Winfrey Show on ABC. It received a 3.2 rating in the 18-43 demographic. The episode's ratings were significantly down from the previous episode, "The 42-Year-Old Virgin", which was viewed by 8.12 million viewers upon its initial airing, and garnered a 2.8 rating in the 18–49 demographic. The episode's ratings and total viewership were also the lowest since the season four episode "Dope & Faith", which was viewed by 6.20 million viewers and acquired a 2.2 rating in the 18-49 demographic.

"Surro-Gate" received mixed reviews from critics, with most critiquing the episode's political undertones, while others praised its social commentary. Genevieve Koski of The A.V. Club gave it a negative review, calling it "predictable" and mentioning that she preferred family-centered episodes such as "Meter Made" and "The Vacation Goo" to episodes that satirized politics. She went on to criticize the subplot, saying "I would have much preferred to see an all-out war between the two factions, rather than Roger and Steve wearing diapers and slowly growing even more pathetic". She gave the episode a C−, the lowest grade of the night. In his review of the Volume 3 box set, James Musgrove of IGN cited the episode as a "fine example" of one of the season's "severely unfunny" installments, calling the episode "quite a stumble though, harkening back to the shaky first steps of this still-growing television comedy". Francis Rizzo III of DVD Talk called the episode "wonderful" in his review of the Volume 3 box set, praising "Surro-Gate", and previous season episode "Bush Comes to Dinner", for "sharpen(ing) the knives".
