= The Two Hundred =

- American Dad! episode
- Army of Roger's past personas, featuring many callbacks to previous episodes
- Episode no.: Season 11; Episode 10
- Directed by: Jansen Yee
- Written by: Brett Cawley; Robert Maitia
- Production code: AAJN10
- Original air date: March 28, 2016
- Running time: 21 minutes

Episode chronology
← Previous "Anchorfran"	Next → "The Unincludeds"
- American Dad! season 13

"The Two Hundred" is the tenth episode of the thirteenth season of the American animated television series American Dad!, and the 200th episode of the series overall. Written by Brett Cawley and Robert Maitia and directed by Jansen Yee, it was first broadcast on TBS in the United States on March 28, 2016. The episode takes place in a previously unseen post-apocalyptic version of Langley Falls that is never seen again, and as such is not considered canon.

The show contains multiple references to popular culture, including a gag sequence being a shot-for-shot remake of a similar scene in Ferris Bueller's Day Off. In the episode, a tattoo-covered Stan traverses a post apocalyptic Langley Falls in search of his family, while trying to dodge the illusive "Two Hundred", an army consisting of 200 of Roger's personas (and a metaphor for the series reaching two hundred episodes), picking up his neighbor Greg and housemate Roger on the way. The episode was viewed by over 1.08 million viewers, acquiring a 0.56 rating in the 18-49 demographic upon its initial airing, according to Nielsen ratings. The episode received acclaim upon release, and is often considered by critics to be one of the best American Dad! episodes, being featured in several critic's lists for the series' finest episodes.

== Plot ==
After a blast has left Langley Falls as a barren post-apocalyptic wasteland, an unknown dangerous entity simply titled "The Two Hundred" is said to inhabit Langley Falls. Stan (now covered in tattoos) traverses the area in search of his family. Stan enters his now destroyed home, where he finds Principal Lewis with a fire plough in the kitchen. Stan confronts Lewis and believes he knows the whereabouts of his family, which Lewis denies. Lewis and Stan converse and Stan reveals he was in South America on a mission when the blast happened. Stan explains the meaning of his falcon tattoo is to serve a reminder of Hayley, flashing back to a scene of Stan and Hayley fishing which eventually turns into an argument between the two. When Stan suggests Hayley should go to a protest, Hayley decides to hold a protest in their fishing spot and grabs several fish attempting to release them back into the sea. Hayley's plan falls through as a falcon comes down and grabs each fish as she throws them in. Flashing forward to the present, Principal Lewis sharpens his teeth and pounces on Stan, attempting to eat him. Stan jolts out of the house and runs into Greg, and the two flee from the scene, but not before Lewis can cut off one of Greg's legs.

Stan and Greg start to head towards a "new haven safe zone", which Greg believes is where Stan's family is hiding out. During the journey, Greg inquires about Stan's doily tattoo, to which Stan reveals that the tattoo serves as a testament to Steve. A flashback shows Stan and Steve running a father-son obstacle course, where Steve injures himself and fails to complete the challenge, which forces Steve to stay bedridden until his injuries clear up and gives him time to knit, particularly doilies. Stan and Greg are trapped by hunters, but they soon run off once they see Roger, who reveals that he made up "The Two Hundred". Roger joins Stan and Greg's mission to find the family, and the three catch a train in an attempt to avoid a pack of wild dogs. Roger informs Stan that he is not interested in learning about his tattoos, but Stan ignores Roger's request and explains his trash can tattoo, which we learn is in memory of Francine, as he flashes back to a scene where he forgets to take out the trash, forcing Francine to chase down the garbage truck in hopes of reaching it to give their trash. Francine fails this and we flash back to the present. Greg is soon attacked by a survivor of the blast on the train, but they all end up making it out okay and reach the "new haven safe zone", but find it deserted, causing them to believe the family was killed in the blast. Lewis then shows up and captures the three in a cart with the intention of eating them, but not before cutting off Greg's other leg.

While in the cage awaiting their fate, Stan reveals his next tattoo, the phrase "See ya, Wouldn't Wanna Be Ya!" which is the final thing Stan says to his family before he goes to South America, and the final thing he says to them before the blast. Hayley and Steve show up and capture Lewis, but they are unable to free the three from their cage, who are now also dangling off of a cliff. Francine then shows up and uses the muscle she gained from the trash day experience to help free Stan and then Roger and Greg, and the family all reconcile, but are soon surrounded by all the other survivors of the blast. Just then, "The Two Hundred" arrive to attack, and they are revealed to be Roger's 200 previous personas. Roger flashes back to a moment when he wandered into a "hadron collider" and unintentionally creates 200 clones of himself. Jeff shows up riding a dragon version of Klaus and destroys the 200 Rogers, a time-skip occurs and Stan tells his grandchildren about the event, ending on the moral that Roger should never be trusted on his lonesome.

== Production ==
"The Two Hundred" is the 200th episode of "American Dad!" in both production number and broadcast order. The episode was directed by series veteran Jansen Yee, in her 24th time directing an episode of the show. This is the first episode she directed since "Hayley Smith, Seal Team Six". Megan Kelly served as the assistant director for the episode. It was written by Brett Cawley and Robert Maitia. This would be their sixth time co-writing an episode together, and the second time writing an episode for the season, having both previously written the season 13 episode "Roots". Seth MacFarlane, creator and executive producer of American Dad!, as well as its sister shows Family Guy and The Cleveland Show, served as the executive producer for the episode, as well as series veterans Brian Boyle and Matt Weitzman. Series veteran Diana Ritchey served as animation producer for the episode, in her ninth episode of the season.

A significant number of recurring voice actors were featured in the episode, including Richard Kind as Al Tuttle, Kevin Michael Richardson as Principal Lewis, and Patrick Stewart as Avery Bullock. Jeff Fischer returns to resume his role as Hayley's husband, Jeff Fischer. Stephen Merchant guest stars as the voice of the lab technician.

According to Matt Weitzman, "The Two Hundred" was originally conceived as a "smaller story about Stan meeting a guy with a tattoo, him getting a tattoo, and then becoming really obsessed with it", but they reworked the idea once they realized the humor in Stan having his own surplus of tattoos, instead.

== Cultural references ==
The episode contains several pop culture references to other television series, books, and movies. The episode's title and premise are a homage to the post-apocalyptic science fiction series The 100, which aired on The CW. The chase scene in which Francine attempts to reach the garbage truck in time and the scenes accompanying music are both parodies of a similarly structured chase scene in Ferris Bueller's Day Off, even borrowing jokes from the scene and reworking them around the series' cast. When Stan brandishes a sword to Principal Lewis' face accusing him of knowing the location of his family, Lewis says "I swear! To the old Gods and the new!", a phrase popularized from Game of Thrones, and the title of an episode of the aforementioned series. Stan's tattoo story line borrows from Ray Bradbury's "The Illustrated Man", in which a carnival freak's tattoos each tell a different story, a framing device that is similarly used throughout the episode. One of Stan's tattoos is of Santa Claus in a no symbol, this is a callback to the events of American Dad's previous Christmas specials ("For Whom the Sleigh Bell Tolls" and "Minstrel Krampus").

== Release and reception ==
"The Two Hundred" first aired on TBS in the United States on March 28, 2016. The episode's original broadcast attracted 1.08 million viewers and a 0.56 rating in the 18-49 demographic, being the highest-rated episode of the season since "The Devil Wears a Lapel Pin". The episode's viewership was up from the previous episode, "Anchorfran", which was viewed by 0.96 million viewers and drew in a 0.53 rating in the 18-49 demographic.

Upon release, "The Two Hundred" was met with critical acclaim. Daniel Kurland of Den of Geek gave the episode a 4/5, particularly praising the ending of the episode, calling it "a triumph all around", but said that before the ending he thought it "wasn't as good as "100 A.D."". Concluding his review, Kurland said that "As American Dad now boldly heads into the next 200 episodes, with the quality present here, as well as through this twelfth season in general, I can definitively say, Seeya, I would wanna be ya". a reference to the plot point in the episode revolving around that phrase.

A reviewer for The Avocado, who goes by the pseudonym "Dikachu", gave the episode an A rating, going on to praise the episode's "outside-the-box, non-canonical insanity at which this show excels", and cites the episode as proof of the series' "ability to still produce incredibly funny, well-written, adventurous, and artistically beautiful episodes." In an article written for Comic Book Resources ranking the 15 best episodes of the series, "The Two Hundred" was placed in the #1 spot, saying that episode's focus on "(letting) the whole family shine" puts it above Rapture's Delight, the episode that placed second on the list. They added that "(the episode's) perfect blend of comedy, heartwarming family drama, and seeing the return of all of Roger's personas easily makes "The Two Hundred" the best American Dad episode." Daniel Kurland of Den of Geek placed the episode in the #10 spot for his list of the show's best episodes, citing the sequence of "Roger’s most memorable personae (running) through with laser-like precision" as a standout moment, and calls the episode a "welcome detour from the usual playground that the series operates in".
