= American Dad! season 1 =

American Dad!
- Season 1
- DVD box set for Volume 1
- Starring: Seth MacFarlane; Wendy Schaal; Scott Grimes; Rachael MacFarlane; Dee Bradley Baker
- No. of episodes: 7

Release
- Original network: Fox
- Original release: February 6 – June 19, 2005

Season chronology
- Next → Season 2

The first season of American Dad! aired on Fox from February 6, 2005, to June 19, 2005, and consists of seven episodes. The series (at this point) focuses on the eccentric upper middle class Smith family in a fictionalized version of Langley, Virginia and their six housemates: Father, CIA agent, and Republican, Stan; housewife Francine; their liberal, hippie daughter, Hayley; their dorky high-school-aged son, Steve; the family's unusual goldfish, Klaus; and flamboyant, homebound alien, Roger.

Nineteen episodes were produced during the first production cycle with production numbers 1AJNxx, but only seven were aired in the first season, with the remaining twelve making up the majority of season 2.

The series premiere, "Pilot", was broadcast directly after Super Bowl XXXIX and was watched by 15.1 million viewers; the highest number of viewers the series ever amassed. The rest of the first season would then air between May 1 and June 19, 2005, all premiering on Sunday nights. The series received mixed reviews from most critics, though it did receive praise for some episodes, particularly "Deacon Stan, Jesus Man" and "Homeland Insecurity". The season, along with the first six episodes of season 2, are included within the Volume One DVD box set, which released in Region 1 on April 25, 2006, Region 2 on April 24, 2006, and Region 4 on May 24, 2006.

MacFarlane and Weitzman conceived the idea for American Dad! in 2000, after the win of the Bush administration in the election. In 2003, Fox Broadcasting ordered a short pilot presentation of the then tentatively titled American Dad! and stated "If greenlit, American Dad! could launch as early as fall 2004." At the time, Fox was aiming to develop a new lineup of adult animated sitcoms. The pilot presentation would then be extended to a full 22 minutes and air as the series' first episode.

== Development ==
=== Conception ===
In 1999, Family Guy, Seth MacFarlane's first animated show, aired on Fox to massive ratings success. During this time, MacFarlane had come up with the idea for American Dad! after the 2000 presidential election; stating "me and co-creator Matt Weitzman were so frustrated with the Bush administration that we would just spend days bitching and complaining, and we figured we should channel this into something creative and hopefully profitable."

Later, series co-creator Mike Barker stated, "About a year and a half ago, Seth called and asked if Matt and I would be interested in working on a show about a right-wing CIA agent and his liberal daughter. It was right up our alley, and everything just fell into place." In late 2003, Variety reported that Fox Broadcasting had ordered a pilot presentation of the then tentatively titled American Dad! and "If greenlit, American Dad! could launch as early as fall 2004." At the time, Fox was aiming to develop a new lineup of adult animated sitcoms following the cancellation of Family Guy.

=== Cast ===
The season aired on the Fox Network in the United States. Season one had a cast of five main actors. MacFarlane provided the voice of Stan, the Republican C.I.A. agent patriarch of the family. The family's flamboyant pet alien, Roger, was also voiced by MacFarlane. Other members of the family include Francine, the mild-mannered housewife, voiced by Wendy Schaal; Steve, the geeky, high school aged son, voiced by Scott Grimes; and Hayley, the liberal daughter, who often butts heads with Stan, voiced by Rachael MacFarlane. The family also includes Klaus Heisler, the often overlooked, incredibly horny fish, voiced by Dee Bradley Baker.

== Episodes ==
No. overall	No. in season	Title	Directed by	Written by	Original release date	Prod. code	U.S. viewers (millions)
1	1	"Pilot"	Ron Hughart	Seth MacFarlane, Mike Barker & Matt Weitzman	February 6, 2005	1AJN01	15.15
CIA agent Stan Smith helps his geeky son, Steve Smith, get the attention of a cheerleader by rigging the student council elections in his favor. Meanwhile, Roger (an extraterrestrial living with the Smiths) gets angry when Stan's wife, Francine, cuts off his junk food supply in fearing he might be getting fat and turns to helping Hayley (the community college-attending, socially liberal daughter of the family) finish her term papers in exchange for sweets.
2	2	"Threat Levels"	Brent Woods	David Zuckerman	May 1, 2005	1AJN02	9.32
After a deadly virus scare, Francine wishes to do more with her life and becomes a realtor, making Stan feel insecure and unmanly. Meanwhile, Hayley uses one of the houses in her mother's portfolio to set up a homeless shelter, but fights over it with Steve who, initially, wanted to use the house to videotape teenage girls flashing their breasts and "going wild", but teams up with Stan to start a bum fight club.
3	3	"Stan Knows Best"	Pam Cooke	Mike Barker & Matt Weitzman	May 8, 2005	1AJN03	8.28
Hayley moves out of the house – and into her boyfriend's van – after having enough of Stan's harsh rules. Meanwhile, Steve claims that Roger is his horribly disfigured burn-victim sister in order to gain sympathy from and ask out a girl to the school dance (and to get her bra on a dare).
4	4	"Francine's Flashback"	Caleb Meurer & Brent Woods	Rick Wiener & Kenny Schwartz	May 15, 2005	1AJN05	7.84
After forgetting their anniversary, Stan arranges to have the last 20 hours of Francine's memory erased, but a bungling technician accidentally erases 20 years, making Francine think she's a wild and carefree teenager from 1985. Meanwhile, a popular girl will only date Steve if someone goes out with her ugly best friend, Jewel – who finds a mate in a reluctant Roger.
5	5	"Roger Codger"	Albert Calleros	Dan Vebber	June 5, 2005	1AJN04	6.09
When Roger slips into a coma after being excoriated by Stan, the Smiths think he is dead and dispose of his body. While the family copes with their "loss", with Francine becoming an atheist, and Steve disowning Stan, Roger awakens in a landfill and journeys home with an old, racist woman who thinks Roger is one of her elderly friends.
6	6	"Homeland Insecurity"	Rodney Clouden	Neal Boushell & Sam O'Neal	June 12, 2005	1AJN06	6.85
Stan learns his new neighbors are Iranian and immediately suspects that they are terrorists. Meanwhile, Roger tries to discover any hidden alien powers he may have while Steve is left at the mercy of the Scout Rangers, and Francine tries to reconnect with her neighbors.
7	7	"Deacon Stan, Jesus Man"	John Aoshima	Nahnatchka Khan	June 19, 2005	1AJN07	6.55
Stan, wanting to beat his rival at something, volunteers to become a replacement deacon against him after the previous deacon dies. Meanwhile, Roger is going through his reproductive cycle and, in the process, accidentally impregnates Steve.

=== Extras ===
No.	Title	Directed by	Written by	Original release date	Prod. code
1	"Original Pilot"	...	...	Never Aired (made in 2004)	N/A
Francine puts Roger on a diet. After being rejected by a girl, Steve notices that girls are affectionate to men with dogs, and wants to get a dog. Hayley agrees to provide Roger with junk food when he offers to write her English papers for her. Stan rigs the school election so that Steve becomes the school president.
2	"Inside the CIA"	Seth MacFarlane	Mike Barker & Matt Weitzman	April 8, 2005	1AJN00
Stan's video is ruined by constant interruption by his family, including appearances of Roger, whom Stan passes off as a kid who smoked a "marijuana cigarette" and Hayley's attempts at taking down the government by ranting about its dubious practices and decisions. In desperation, Stan shoots at the camera, which dies with the second bullet and goes to static. Notes: The short film was theatrically released alongside 20th Century Fox's film Fever Pitch.

== Reception ==
The season and series premiere, Pilot, aired following Super Bowl XXXIX. This premiere episode was broadcast as part of an animated television night on Fox, following an episode of The Simpsons. The episode was watched by 15.1 million viewers. In addition, the season was nominated for a Golden Reel Award for the episode "Homeland Insecurity".

Season one was met with mixed reviews. Certain critics commented positively on the season, such as DVD Fanatic, who graded the season a "B" rating. The website stated "the series may not be fully there yet, but it shows more promise than Futurama did in its first season", and listed "Homeland Insecurity" and "Deacon Stan, Jesus Man" as the "best episodes" of the season. Sophie Evans of Screen Rant wrote a negative review of the season, criticizing it for a reliance on political humor, and for Stan's character.

IGN wrote a mixed review stating, "At its worst, American Dad! proves critics right – it is a lot like Family Guy. Stan is an idiot, Roger and Klaus are very similar to Stewie and Brian, and Francine acts as the voice of reason. Sure, there are differences, but there are plenty of moments when the characterizations are exactly the same. This isn't necessarily a bad thing, but if you're not a fan of Family Guy you might not be a huge fan of this show, either." However, the website believed the series showed improvement towards the end of the season, saying "once you get into the season, the show becomes downright hilarious, and the humor really detaches from Family Guy. It feels like it took some time for the writers to get used to not having the cutaways of Family Guy, and finally came to grips with the new format.", citing "Deacon Stan, Jesus Man" and as one of the highlights of the season.

== Home media ==
American Dad! – Volume One
DVD Set Details
13 Episodes; 3-disc Set; 1.33:1 Aspect Ratio; Subtitles: English, French, Spanish; English (Dolby Digital 2.0)
Special Features
Audio commentary on select episodes; All in the Family - Creating American Dad; How's Your Aspen?: American Dad Performance at HBO's 2005 U.S. Comedy Arts Festival; Secrets of the Glass Booth; American Animatics!; "Threat Levels" Table Read/Animatic Comparison; The New CIA; Super Bowl promo; Family Guy "Bored"
Release Dates
Region 1	Region 2	Region 4
April 25, 2006	April 24, 2006	May 24, 2006

American Dad! – Volume One was originally released by 20th Century Home Entertainment as a three-disc region 1 DVD box set in the U.S. on April 25, 2006. The DVD release contains all of season one, along with the first six episodes of season two.

It features bonus material such as deleted scenes for each episode, select episode animatics and a short clip from HBO's 2005 U.S. Comedy Arts Festival. Also included is audio commentary on select episodes, each by either voice actors or crew members who worked on the episode.
