= Klaus Heisler =

Fictional character from American Dad!

- American Dad! character
- Promotional Image
- First appearance: "Pilot" (2005)
- Created by: Seth MacFarlane; Mike Barker; Matt Weitzman
- Designed by: Seth MacFarlane
- Voiced by: Dee Bradley Baker

In-universe information
- Full name: Klaus Heisler; Ace McNasty (legal American name)
- Species: Goldfish; Spotted seal (formerly); Human (formerly); SUV (formerly); Moose (formerly); Nun (formerly); Shark (formerly); Monkey (formerly)
- Gender: Male
- Family: Stan Smith (owner); Francine Smith (owner); Steve Smith (owner/friend); Hayley Smith (owner/ex-wife); Roger (roommate/friendly rival/ex-sexual partner); Jeff (owner/friend); Rogu (Roger's son)
- Home: Langley Falls, Virginia
- Nationality: German

Klaus Heisler is a fictional character from the American animated television series American Dad!. He is voiced by Dee Bradley Baker and first appeared on television, along with the rest of his family, when American Dad! initially premiered on Fox on February 6, 2005, with the series' pilot episode. Klaus is a German whose brain has been placed in a goldfish's head. Once an East German Olympic ski-jumper, he is now the Smith family's hapless and frequently mistreated goldfish.

== Personality ==
Klaus Heisler debuted in American Dad!'s first episode, Pilot, where it is soon revealed that Klaus was once an East German Olympic ski-jumper, until his mind was transferred into the body of a goldfish during the 1986 Winter Olympics by the CIA to prevent him from winning the gold medal, leaving him trapped in the goldfish's body. Klaus still has not come to terms with what happened, at times malcontent and gloomy. Not confined to his fishbowl, Klaus is often seen uniquely scooting himself about the Smith residence, reclined in a dish of water. In the early seasons, Klaus had an obsessive crush on Francine Smith and often made sexual advances to her, but stopped after the events of "Finances with Wolves", in which Stan saves Klaus' life despite his attempt to have sex with Francine. For much of the later seasons, the Smith family and particularly Roger have been shown to treat Klaus with disdain, take him for granted, and even mistreat him. Though when the going gets rough, they will admit they do love him and consider him family. In the later Fox seasons, Klaus was shown to be the smartest and most reasonable character in the family, often trying to warn or advise the Smiths of their wrongdoings of selfishness, stupidity, or recklessness. In the TBS seasons, Klaus developed into a stereotype of bro culture, prone to the Smiths' deranged behavior.

=== Relationship with Roger ===
Klaus and Roger's relationship is best described as a sibling rivalry. At times they dislike each other and at other times they get along well. Roger is seen to be incredibly spiteful toward Klaus and insists on trying to make him feel despised, saying things like "You can't participate Klaus, I hate you. I say that not out of anger but as a fact" in "Great Space Roaster" and "It's like you want to be kicked out of this family" in "The One That Got Away". Klaus does things to get Roger into trouble for his amusement, like when he tricked him into eating Francine's potato salad in "Deacon Stan, Jesus Man". When a horrified Roger asked why Klaus would do something like that he just laughed and said "I'm German, it's what we do." In "A Piñata Named Desire", after Klaus made a comment about acting, Roger simply knocked Klaus's fish bowl across the room, smashed it against the wall, and walked out of the room as if nothing had happened while the fish lay gasping on the floor.

Among everyone else living in the Smith household, Klaus is very much the most aware and sensible of Roger's contemptuous, abusive, and insanely-vindictive nature of selfishness and lack of morality and occasionally tries to warn the rest of the family against listening to or getting involved with him. Such instances, however, are ignored by everyone's naivety and general inability (or lack of interest) to take most matters seriously or remember that Klaus is a "man in a fish's body" rather than just a mere talking goldfish, as said in "Dr. Klaustus".

Although Roger has claimed to hate Klaus in the past, they do have a bond and are capable of being civil to each other such as when they head to Europe together in "Red October Sky". Further evidence of this can be seen in "Pulling Double Booty", as Roger and Klaus are quite content to watch a movie together and show annoyance when they must pause it as Stan intrudes with the cookie dough. Another example is that Klaus is often shown in the attic with Roger as he tends his fake bar in many disguises while in "Live and Let Fry" Roger dresses up as Klaus, the human, to help him get access to a family member's will. In the end, it turns out to be a trap to lure Klaus out of hiding and Roger gets beaten up because Klaus owed some money to the East German Mafia. However, Klaus stays with him and keeps him company during his recovery, making sure Roger has sufficient pain medication to help him through it. Klaus was also the only member of the Smith family to remember Roger's birthday in "1600 Candles" and the alien seemed genuinely touched that he had bothered to prepare a birthday surprise for him.

Klaus and Roger engage in a sexual relationship in "Kloger", but Klaus breaks it off when Roger starts to want to act like a real couple, as Klaus was only interested in the taboo aspect of sneaking around the family for their relationship.

=== Relationship with Francine ===
Despite showing sexual advances towards Francine in the early seasons, Klaus has shown he does care for her well being, evident in "Big Trouble in Little Langley". Upon overhearing the Dawsons (Francine's birth family) light-heartedly mention they gave her up so they can maintain riding in first-class, he sees them for who they really are and is upset by this. Klaus wisely warned Stan to remove them out of the house because he is setting Francine up to be hurt by them and tries to convince him to reconcile with the Lings instead. While this makes him uncomfortable, Stan refuses to listen to him and wants to try. He would later regret it when the warning Klaus gave to Stan was true about the Dawsons, especially after they selfishly leave him in the burning house. In the first episode of Season 10 "Roger Passes the Bar", Klaus tells Francine a story of a time when he bounced a check for his girlfriend's abortion, resulting in them putting the baby back inside of her, "and that baby was Shia LaBeouf," he states; implying that Klaus is in actuality Shia LaBeouf's father.

=== Relationship with Stan ===
Klaus and Stan have a complex relationship, which can best be defined as a rocky friendship. Stan's refusal to help Klaus find a human body, as well as his tendency to treat him with marked disrespect, is often a source of tension in the two's relationship. Despite this, the two care for one another, despite both being guilty of treating each other poorly. When given an opportunity, Klaus has been shown to delight in tormenting Stan on several occasions, or betraying him if he feels he has been sufficiently wronged. In other episodes, Klaus has been a source of advice for Stan, often being one of the primary characters the latter consults about his relationship with Francine or his kids. The two have become closer in recent episodes, doing activities together such as watching football together on Thanksgiving, hosting a podcast about 90s' music, stopping street crime when Klaus inserts his mind into Stan's car, and moving to Chicago together.

=== Relationship with Steve ===
Klaus and Steve tend to get along consistently well, in contrast with other members of the family. With the possible exception of Roger, Klaus is the most frequently present member of the main cast in storylines concerning Steve and his friends, playing announcer for them when they wrestle, helping Snot deck out a basement, and telling Steve and Snot German stories. Like Roger, he is often critical of Steve's effeminate mannerisms, at one point asking him if he's "allergic to vaginas".

== Development ==
Dee Bradley Baker provides the voice of Klaus Heisler. During the show's early ages, Klaus was originally conceived as French. When Dee Bradley Baker came to audition for the character, he ended up doing a German accent instead. Shortly after he was done with his audition, the producers ended up casting him for the role.

=== German dubbing ===
In the German version of the show, Klaus speaks with a Saxonian dialect and is voiced by Andreas Müller (de), and his remarks about World War II and the heroic defense of the Germans against the Allies are sometimes replaced by remarks about East Germany and the Stasi ("Staatssicherheitsdienst," the former East German Ministry for State Security and security service).

=== French dubbing ===
In the French version of the show, the character is dubbed by Guy Chapellier, who also dubbed Roger.
