= Pilot (American Dad!) =

- American Dad! episode
- Episode no.: Season 1 Episode 1
- Directed by: Ron Hughart
- Written by: Seth MacFarlane; Mike Barker; Matt Weitzman
- Production code: 1AJN01
- Original air date: February 6, 2005
- Running time: 21 minutes

Guest appearance
- Carmen Electra as Lisa Silver

Episode chronology
← Previous —	Next → "Threat Levels"
- American Dad! season 1

"Pilot" is the series premiere of the American animated television series American Dad!. It originally aired on the Fox Network on February 6, 2005, following Super Bowl XXXIX and an episode of The Simpsons. The episodes introduces the series' main protagonist Stan Smith, who rigs a school election to make his son Steve more popular. The episode was written by series co-creators Seth MacFarlane, Mike Barker and Matt Weitzman and directed by Ron Hughart. The episode was leaked onto the internet before its initial premiere on FOX. It features a guest appearance by Carmen Electra.

Seth MacFarlane, who is best known for creating Family Guy, stated that he and Weitzman came up with the series after the 2000 United States presidential election. Initially, the series was to replace Family Guy after its cancellation, but it was revived after the pilot episode aired. Because of this, MacFarlane chose to focus on Family Guy and handed creative control over to Barker and Weitzman. After the pilot aired, the rest of the first season began on May 1, 2005, on Fox's Animation Domination lineup which had its debut on that date.

The pilot received mixed reviews from critics and fans, with many people calling American Dad! a rip off of Family Guy. Despite the mixed reviews, it was a ratings success. According to the Nielsen ratings, it was viewed by 15.10 million people in the United States, and acquired a 7.5 rating in the 18-49 demographic.

== Plot ==
Steve is upset about his lack of popularity. He notices girls seem to be attracted to guys with dogs, so he asks his parents if he can get one. Stan gets Steve a 19-year-old dog, because it was alive during the Reagan administration. One night, Roger makes a noise and Stan goes downstairs, thinking it is an intruder. Stan shoots the intruder, only to find out that he just accidentally killed Steve's dog.

They bury the dog, and Stan tries to make up for it by rigging the school election and discrediting his opponent by showing an altered photo of her in bed with the Jack in the Box Man (who Stan tells Steve, and Roger later discovers, is still in their basement) so that Steve wins and becomes the school president. Once elected, Steve uses his position as student body president to impress the head cheerleader, Lisa Silver, turn the lockers into edible chocolate ones, and changes the word "period" to Steve. He soon gets corrupted with power, but believes that he is successful; until Lisa dumps him when he tries to kiss her. Steve goes crazy and holds the school hostage. Stan sneaks into the school and gets Steve to stop by revealing that he was unpopular in high school as well.

In a side plot, the audience is introduced to Roger, an alien who saved Stan's life in Area 51. As gratitude, Roger lives with the Smiths, but his presence is not known by the CIA, Stan's employer, and the world. Since Stan fears that the CIA would erase his and Roger's memories if the alien were ever discovered; Roger is forced to live in confinement at the family home. Roger is also addicted to sugar, and Francine puts him on a forced diet when his weight causes him to break a chair and the dinner table. To get around Francine's strict control on junk food in the house, Roger strikes a deal with Hayley to do her homework in exchange for her smuggling sweets to him. The plan works initially, but on the night before the deadline for one of Hayley's papers on Henry Kissinger, Roger has too much sugar and passes out without doing the work. He and Hayley devise an excuse to make her teacher give her an extension on the paper's deadline (they dig up Steve's dead dog, and Hayley tells the teacher that she just lost her dog). After this scare, however, Hayley decides to discontinue her agreement with Roger. Roger, noticing Steve's frustration in getting a girl, becomes his adviser for dating, in exchange for a "buttload" of Twinkies. Roger also reveals that an ooze shoots out of his body every 7 hours, "like clockwork".

== Production ==
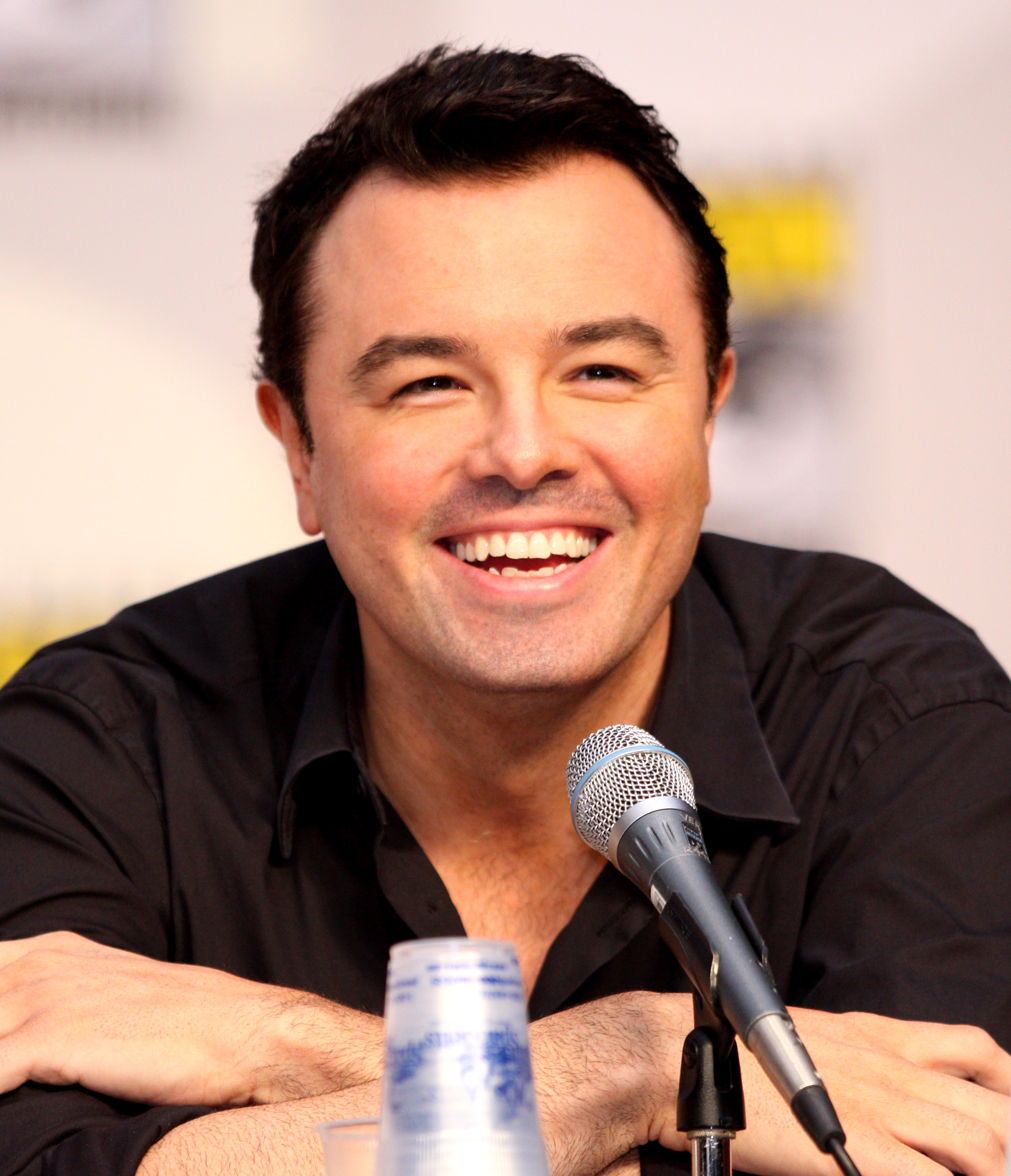
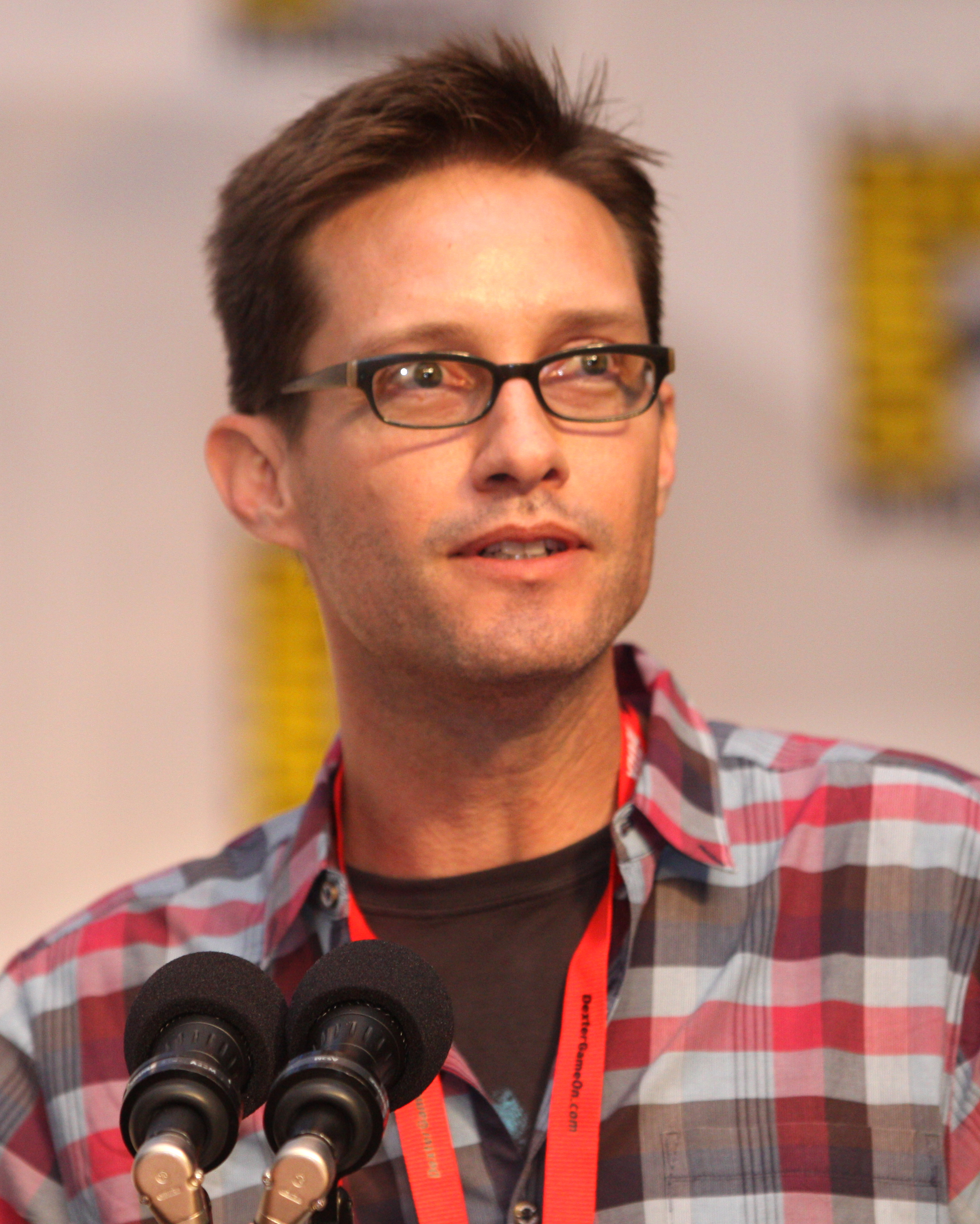
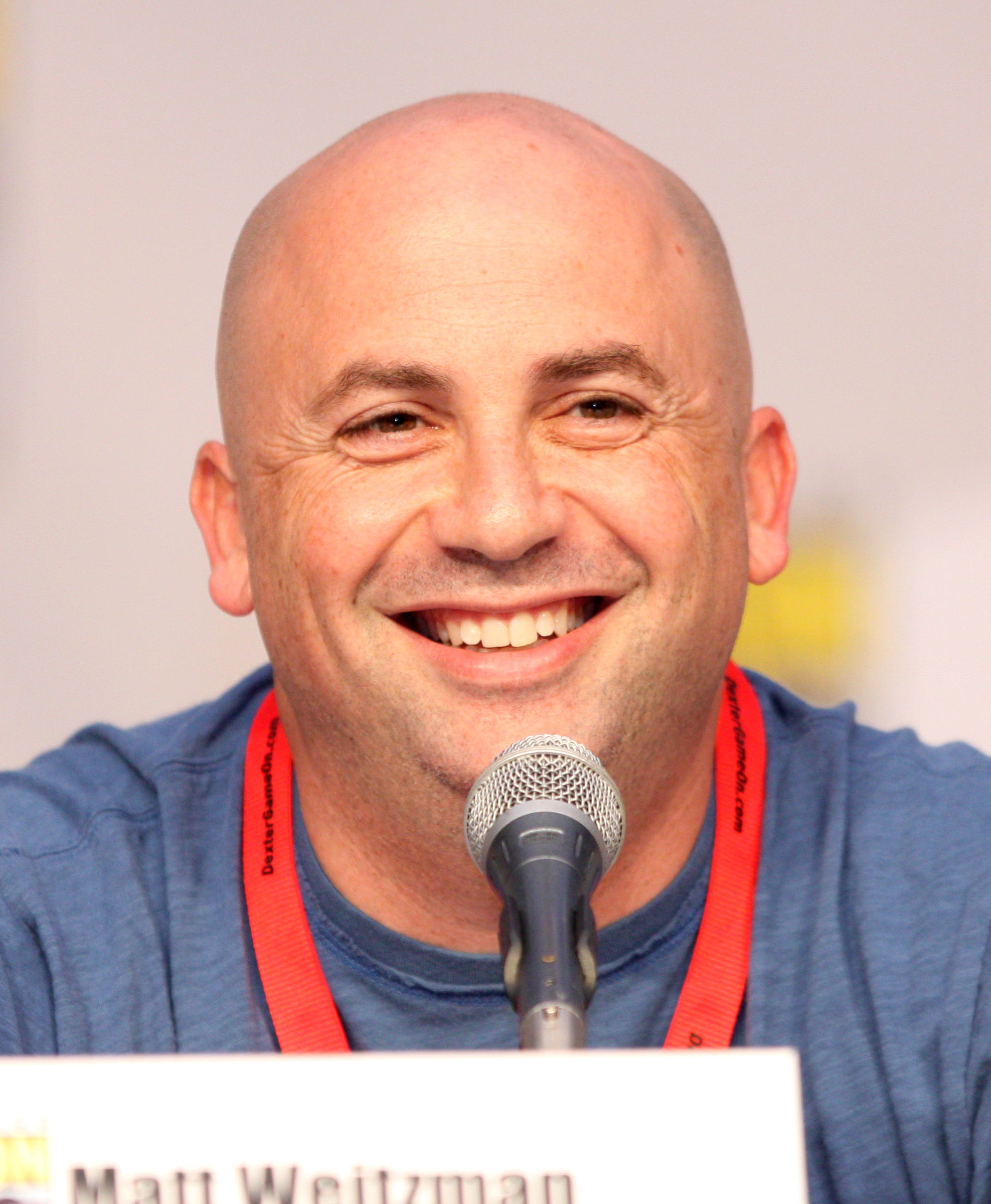
American Dad! creators and pilot writers. From left to right; Seth MacFarlane, Mike Barker, and Matt Weitzman.

In 1999, Family Guy, MacFarlane's first animated show, aired on Fox to ratings success. During this time, MacFarlane came up with the idea for American Dad! after the 2000 presidential election; stating "me and co-creator Matt Weitzman were so frustrated with the Bush administration that we would just spend days bitching and complaining, and we figured we should channel this into something creative and hopefully profitable." Later, series co-creator Mike Barker stated, "About a year and a half ago, Seth called and asked if Matt and I would be interested in working on a show about a right-wing CIA agent and his liberal daughter. It was right up our alley, and everything just fell into place." On September 14, 2003, Variety reported that Fox Broadcasting had ordered a pilot presentation of the then tentatively titled American Dad! and "If greenlit, American Dad! could launch as early as fall 2004." At the time, Fox was aiming to develop a new lineup of adult animated sitcoms.

The original American Dad! pilot was a 6-minute version of the show's official pilot. This precursory pilot was used by MacFarlane, Barker, and Weitzman to sell American Dad! to Fox and was never aired along with the rest of the series. Fox green-lit the show and announced that it would air after Super Bowl XXXIX on February 6, 2005. While American Dad! was being pitched to Fox, the network canceled Family Guy in 2002, and Fox planned on marketing American Dad! as a replacement for Family Guy. However, in 2005, Family Guy was revived due to high re-run ratings and DVD sales. As a result, MacFarlane chose to focus on Family Guy and handed creative control of American Dad! to Barker and Weitzman.

== Cultural references ==
Steve's Shazam! shirt is a reference to the comic book character of the same name. The algebra teacher's name is Mr. Feeney, a reference to the show Boy Meets World. The school is named after Pearl Bailey, an actress and singer who won a Tony Award for playing Dolly Levi in Hello, Dolly!.

== Reception ==
"Pilot" received a 7.5 Nielsen rating, the highest number of viewers the series has ever amassed. It was viewed by a total of 15.10 million people in the United States.

The pilot episode received mixed reviews from critics. In a review of American Dad! Volume 1 DVD, Michael Drucker of IGN stated that it's "occasionally weighed down with its topical humor. Characters are extremely polarized, especially Stan and Hayley, and the constant flow of jokes about their politics can become tiring." The New York Times's Alessandra Stanley said the show "aspires to pick up where The Simpsons and South Park left off, but many of its jokes and cultural references seem off." Robert Bianco of USA Today said "If you like Family Guy, you'll probably like American Dad. The problem is, if you've seen Family Guy, you've already seen American Dad." In a negative review, Thomas Conner of the Chicago Sun-Times said "The jokes aren't funny, the story is silly (or, really, not silly enough) and the new writers follow the Family Guy model so closely they fail to explain any of the characters or even the premise of the show."
