= Roger (American Dad!) =

Fictional character from American Dad!

- American Dad! character
- First appearance: "Pilot" (2005)
- Created by: Seth MacFarlane; Mike Barker; Matt Weitzman
- Designed by: Seth MacFarlane
- Voiced by: Seth MacFarlane

In-universe information
- Aliases: List: Meredith Fields; Stan's Uncle Roger; Tearjerker; Cecilia Takaro; Raider Dave; Samantha Kingsbury; The Legman; Scotch Bingington; Applebee McFridays; Sidney Huffman; Chilly; Arbuckle T. Boone; Braff Zacklin; Jeannie Gold; Becky Tenderharts; Lieutenant Wingz; Sholanda Dykes; Mr. Deliver; Jeremy Neederhoff; Abigail Lemonparty; Ricky Spanish; Dr. Penguin; Twill Ongenbone; Lazlo Morphine; Martin Sugar; Krispy Kreme McDonald; Jean Louise Finch; Kevin Ramage; Sweeps McCulloch; Clive Trotter; Tom Yabo; Dimitri Krotchlikmioff; Fantasia Lopez; Roland Chang; Spartacus Vanderhill; Chex LeMeneux; Bing Cooper; Roy Rogers McFreely; Laura Vanderbooben; Luke Fondleberg; Reaganomics Lamborghini; Alicia Wilkner; Sgt. Pepper; Cuss Mustard; Ace Chapman; Jenny Fromdabloc; Winfrey Smith; Bob Danalou; Max Jets; Jerry Jets; Kevin Bacon; Parker Peters; Genevieve Vavance; Billy Jesusworth; Trish; Unnamed Nigerian medical student; Frank Slade; Dan Ansom Handsome; Clip Clop; Professor Jordan Edelstein; Warren Beanstalk; Ruby Zeldastein; Emmylou Sugarbean; Ace Crouton; Skylar Montessori; Madeleine Carpal Tunnel; Burt Jarvis; Frankie Marconi; Morris Buttermaker; Horse Renoir; The Phantom of the Telethon; Professor Baxter; Captain François Dubonais; LeVar Crush; Dimitri Garabedian; Marmalade the Cat; Maurice Barnes; Uncle Kappy; Tony O'Chat; Ragi-Baba; Cosworth Smith; Isaac Felipe; Jaureka Ziegler; Valik; Lacey Krinklehoel; Abbey Road; Dom Fikowski; Tasha Flunchtkin; Aussie Michael; The Weeknd; Numerous other unnamed
- Species: Grey alien
- Gender: Male
- Occupation: Bartender (Roger’s Place); Various (depending on alias)
- Family: Stan Smith (housemate/best friend); Francine Smith (housemate/friend); Hayley Smith (housemate/friend); Steve Smith (housemate/close friend); Klaus Heisler (fish/friendly rival)
- Children: Rogu (tumor/son); Jeff Fischer (housemate/friend/rebirthed son)
- Relatives: Fred (father); Caroline (aunt); Rizbo (uncle)
- Origin: Outer space

Roger is a fictional alien character in the adult animated sitcom American Dad!, created, voiced, and designed by Seth MacFarlane. Roger is an anthropomorphic grey space alien living with the Smith family. Having lived on Earth since crashing in Roswell, New Mexico in 1947, Roger came to live with the Smiths after rescuing main character Stan Smith at Area 51 four years prior to the beginning of the series. The character has also made cameo appearances in episodes of Family Guy.

Roger is usually insensitive and careless; he often takes advantage of, cheats, and ridicules people. Over time, the character has also exhibited increasingly sociopathic, cruel, selfish, devious, and depraved behaviours. Due to that, Roger has a love-hate relationship with the Smith family, who care about him despite being his most frequent victims. His most important relationships are with Stan, his best friend, as Stan is annoyed by Roger's antics despite the fact that he saved his life and is the least tolerant of them; Klaus, who is Roger's frenemy; and Steve, who is Roger's partner in many of his misadventures. In early episodes of the show, Roger was disallowed from leaving the Smith house in order to conceal his being an alien. This restriction was soon abandoned and Roger begins adopting disguises and fictitious personas in order to have a life outside the house.

Roger's personas have become a major plot device, with his myriad of alter egos frequently being the subject or facilitator of an episode's main story or subplot. This also helps to amplify his pansexuality and androgynous nature, which varies depending on the plot situation and persona he has adopted. Aside from catalyzing the plot or subplot with his various personas, and despite his increasingly evident self-interest, he often serves to counsel the show's main characters, by humorously affirming or bluntly disregarding their opinions.

When voicing the character, MacFarlane speaks in a swish accent intended to resemble that of Paul Lynde. In April 2014, Roger was voted "Gayest Cartoon Character of All Time" in a first-ever March Madness style competition held by Logo TV.

== Character ==
Roger is an alien who loves drinking wine. He is currently single and is also pansexual. Roger is slightly shorter than Hayley though he was also described as being 3 foot tall by Stan but this was likely just an insult. Having his feelings hurt usually spurs the creation of his alter egos and schemes. As an alien, Roger displays a multitude of bizarre physical traits, such as superhuman speed, being fireproof, and the ability to generate electricity. When stressed, his body can grow large tumors that, when removed, become fully sentient organisms themselves, as seen with his "son" Rogu.

Roger typically displays a lighthearted, carefree temperament while at the same time engaging in his freakish grossness, outrageous malice, and rascally shenanigans. Crude and brazen, Roger has no qualms with randomly saying and doing whatever is on his mind, having little to no sympathy for anyone who might suffer as a result of his actions, and regularly misleading and finagling others to achieve his desired ends. He will engage in complicated schemes for comparatively minor results, such as nearly marrying a woman he finds intolerable in order to get a new blender as a wedding gift, or getting Stan elected mayor of Langley Falls to construct a bullet train, to persuade Urban Outfitters to construct a store in the city. However, according to the episode "Frannie 911", Roger is not this unpleasant by choice; his species of alien must let all unpleasantries out, for if they don't, it will turn into poison and kill them. He is the best friend of both Stan and Steve Smith, and several subplots revolve around the latter, most notably the Wheels and the Legman episodes. Roger and Steve have a love-hate relationship, in which they constantly bicker and insult each other, but show affection for each other several times.

=== History ===
According to "Frannie 911", Roger has been on Earth for over 60 years, having arrived in 1947 as a result of being tricked, led to believe he was "The Decider" in whose hands the fate of humankind rested, when in fact he was serving the role of a crash test dummy. Earlier, after causing his aunt's spaceship to crash, Roger lived with a family of pioneer fur trappers that died traveling on the Oregon Trail in the episode "OreTron Trail". There is also the possibility, he or another member of his alien race came to earth in early antiquity, evidenced by the premiere of season 13: in the episode, a stone carving is depicted as an alien bearing physical similarities to Roger, the alien squatting above a pyramid with two Egyptians presumably praising him and hieroglyph characters surrounding them. In the episode "Naked to the Limit, One More Time" however, it is evidenced that Roger remains on Earth by will, the episode revealing that he can simply call for his alien kind's spaceship to return him to his birth planet if he so desires.

Details on Roger's actual family and pre-Earth life have yet to be shown on the series. Although in the episode "Lost in Space", a brief clip revealed that prior to Roger's life on Earth, he was involved in a homosexual romantic relationship with another member of his alien race, Zing; however, Roger cheated on Zing, blatantly making out with a human male in front of him. It's also been revealed in the episode "I Am the Walrus" that Roger ate his father when he turned 15. Roger revealed in the episode "OreTron Trail", that he once visited Earth before in the 1800s after crash landing with his aunt Caroline and she died on impact.

Roger came into contact with the Smith family when he saved Stan's life back when Roger was a fugitive of Area 51 (four years prior to the show's beginnings). Feeling he owed Roger a life debt because of this, Stan rescued him from government capture and allowed him to live in his home. Stan has allowed this in defiance of his employer, the CIA. Roger now lives in the Smith home and uses the attic as his hideout/room/bar.

=== Roger's disguises/alter egos ===
After Stan took Roger in for saving his life, he felt that it would endanger him and the rest of his family if it were to be discovered that Roger is an alien and living with them. Consequently, Stan forbade him from leaving the house when the series first began, even in disguise. Confined to the house in the first couple of episodes, Roger was miserable and malcontent. However, Roger is able to skillfully use disguises to exist in the outside world, which has become a major plot device in following the first few seasons. Adding to this, he has created countless alter egos to go along with them.

While most of Roger's personas are one-off gags that only appear in individual episodes, some of his personas have become recurring elements, such as the "Legman", the able-bodied counterpart to Steve's "paraplegic" character "Wheels" in their recurring buddy cop-pastiche "Wheels and the Legman". Roger has also appeared several times as the family's therapist "Dr. Penguin", as well as a particularly vicious criminal persona called "Ricky Spanish".

7 of Roger's different disguises in the episode "The Two Hundred"

Roger has, however, abused this practice, leading numerous lives and outrageously deceiving numerous people. In fact, some of Roger's characters are in prison, while others are widely despised, and others inexplicably have full-fledged human families and are even married; several of his characters somehow have birth children while others are graduates of Howard University. Roger also uses several of these personas to act in a criminal manner, as several of his alter egos have been seen to engage in robbery, sexual assault, police corruption, identity theft, drug trafficking, child abuse, and with one persona even admitting to being wanted "for a series of prostitute murders", while at least one self-identifies as a serial killer.

As the series has progressed, Roger's personas have inexplicably developed their own lives that even Roger himself can be unaware of and his control has been shown to be tenuous at best. In "The Horse Whisperer" he realizes seconds before walking into a room (to see a horse therapist) that he is the one inside. In another episode, both he and Hayley express surprise that a character introduced by Roger wasn't one of his personas.

When Roger, in one episode, becomes ill and therefore unable to attend to his countless personas, it is revealed that these personas are in fact an integral part of Langley Falls' social cohesion, with the entire town rapidly descending into widespread chaos and violence in his absence.

Despite his numerous disguises consisting of only a different set of garments and hair with no effort to disguise his gray skin, non-human face and body features (with some exceptions, like additional bodyweight, facial hair, or wrinkles), Roger has been capable of deceiving virtually every single person he interacts with without ever being discovered as an alien; not even by Stan's colleagues from CIA, who according to him, have "an entire floor" looking for Roger. The Smith family is the only exception; however, for each member of the family, there is one individual alter ego they cannot recognize as Roger. On top of that, Roger has been sent to the hospital several times over the course of the series, and medical personnel, for some reason, have never found out that he's not a human; although they have questioned his strange anatomy.

=== Relationship with Stan ===
Stan and Roger's relationship is complicated to say the least, even though they consider each other their best friend, they are more as frenemies. At times Roger and Stan greatly annoy each other, though they can work together quite well. Roger is seen to be incredibly spiteful toward Stan and frequently makes fun of him when his ideas don't work well, however, unlike the rest of the Smith family, Stan is able to put Roger in his place in several occasions, usually by assaulting him in anger or upstaging him in something they compete as revenge for something Roger did before.

Although Roger and Stan act like they hate each other, they do get along multiple times. A notable example can be seen in "You Debt Your Life", when Stan's complaints about Roger's behaviors forced Roger to move out after Stan paid his life debt by saving him from being run over, but later admits that he really missed Roger when he moved out and while Roger may annoy him, he still considers him family.

=== Relationship with Klaus ===
Klaus and Roger's relationship is best described as a sibling rivalry. Like with his relationship with Stan, at times Roger and Klaus dislike each other and at other times they get along well. Roger is seen to be incredibly spiteful toward Klaus and insists on trying to make him feel despised, saying things like "You can't participate Klaus, I hate you. I say that not out of anger but as a fact" in "Great Space Roaster" and "It's like you want to be kicked out of this family" in "The One That Got Away". Klaus does things to get Roger into trouble for his amusement, like when he tricked him into eating Francine's potato salad in "Deacon Stan, Jesus Man". When a horrified Roger asked why Klaus would do something like that he just laughed and said "I'm German, it's what we do." In "A Piñata Named Desire", after Klaus made a comment about acting, Roger simply knocked Klaus's fish bowl across the room, smashed it against the wall, and walked out of the room as if nothing had happened while the fish lay gasping on the floor.

Among everyone else living in the Smith household, Klaus is very much the most aware and sensible of Roger's contemptuous, abusive, and insanely-vindictive nature of selfishness and lack of morality and occasionally tries to warn the rest of the family against listening to or getting involved with him. Such instances, however, are ignored by everyone's naivety and general inability (or lack of interest) to take most matters seriously or remember that Klaus is a "man in a fish's body" rather than just a mere talking goldfish, as said in "Dr. Klaustus".

Although Roger has claimed to hate Klaus in the past, they do have a bond and are capable of being civil to each other such as when they head to Europe together in "Red October Sky". Further evidence of this can be seen in "Pulling Double Booty", as Roger and Klaus are quite content to watch a movie together and show annoyance when they must pause it as Stan intrudes with the cookie dough. Another example is that Klaus is often shown in the attic with Roger as he tends his fake bar in many disguises while in "Live and Let Fry" Roger dresses up as Klaus, the human, to help him get access to a family member's will. In the end, it turns out to be a trap to lure Klaus out of hiding and Roger gets beaten up because Klaus owed some money to the East German Mafia. However, Klaus stays with him and keeps him company during his recovery, making sure Roger has sufficient pain medication to help him through it. Klaus was also the only member of the Smith family to remember Roger's birthday in "1600 Candles" and the alien seemed genuinely touched that he had bothered to prepare a birthday surprise for him.

Klaus and Roger engage in a sexual relationship in "Kloger", but Klaus breaks it off when Roger starts to want to act like a real couple, as Klaus was only interested in the taboo aspect of sneaking around the family for their relationship. Roger then tried to recapture the taboo element by dressing up as a little girl and pretending to be Klaus' daughter. After that got Klaus arrested he got himself arrested so they could be together in prison, but he killed an inmate for trying to come between them and was remanded to solitary confinement for the rest of his sentence, where he realised that he didn't actually want a romantic relationship and was just afraid of being alone.

== Cancelled spin-off film ==
At Comic-Con 2013 on July 20, Mike Barker revealed that an American Dad! film centering on Roger and set on his birth planet would possibly take place in the future. Barker did not announce any specifics as it relates to the nature and type of film he and the rest of the show's creators had in mind for the series; however, he strongly suggested that a film is where the show's staff and creators would like to take things. Barker further hinted that an American Dad! film was already in the works and partially written. No further information about the movie was released following Barker's exit from the series in November 2013, and in August 2022, it was confirmed by Matt Weitzman that the project had been canceled.

== Reception ==
In April 2014, Roger was voted "Gayest Cartoon Character of All Time" in a first-ever March Madness style competition held by Logo TV.
