= Steve Smith (American Dad!) =

Fictional character from American Dad!

- American Dad! character
- First appearance: "Pilot" (2005)
- Created by: Seth MacFarlane; Mike Barker; Matt Weitzman
- Designed by: Seth MacFarlane
- Voiced by: Scott Grimes

In-universe information
- Full name: Steven Anita Smith
- Alias: Wheels
- Nickname: Steve
- Occupation: 9th grader at Pearl Bailey High School
- Family: Stan Smith (father); Francine Smith (mother); Hayley Smith (sister); Roger Smith (alien/housemate/best friend); Klaus Heisler (fish/friend); Jeff Fischer (brother-in-law); Rogu (Roger's son)
- Religion: Episcopalian
- Home: Langley Falls, Virginia
- Nationality: American
- Age: 14

Steven Anita "Steve" Smith is a fictional character in the animated television series American Dad!, voiced by Scott Grimes. He is Stan and Francine Smith's 14-year-old son and Hayley's younger brother as well as the youngest of the series' six main characters.

Steve only has three human geeky friends who frequently accompany him throughout the series, particularly inside their school, Pearl Bailey High. However, his strongest bond is with the family alien, Roger, as they frequently go on surreal adventures together.

The character was initially voiced by Ricky Blitt in an unaired pilot screener and was designed as geeky and physically gawky. Grimes replaced Blitt for the aired pilot and Steve's design was made to be more physically attractive, so he would be less comparable to Neil Goldman from Family Guy.

== Personality ==
At 14 years old, Steve is the youngest member of the Smith family. Upon the series’ 2005 premiere, Steve was 13 years old and has since turned 14 years old (technically, Steve should be 15 by timeline, but was reverted to 14), placing his year of birth around 1992. Steve is portrayed as an enthusiastic, ambitious, and wimpy nerd. In the official series, he is not presented as nerdy as he is in the show's unaired precursory pilot when his appearance, voice, and manner greatly contrasted from what they would eventually become. In the precursory pilot, Steve was also gawkier, scrawnier, and voiced by Ricky Blitt (as opposed to Scott Grimes). In the official series, he's become emphasized as soft, emotional, cute, and endearing. As part of his emotional and sensitive character, Steve is combined with a screechy wail. Despite his wimpy and nerdy characteristics, Steve sometimes displays conceited and obnoxious behavior. He is all too often a showman, always ready to put on a performance and show off his "talents", typically singing and dancing. Steve attends Pearl Bailey High School and is usually accompanied by his equally uncool friends: "Snot", Steve's closest friend with whom he shares a bromance, the two once even having shared a kiss together (in the episode "License to Till"); Toshi, who is an Asian American and only speaks Japanese; and Barry, who is morbidly obese with an inarticulate, strident, and sloppy vocal quality. Steve possesses a keen, yet shallow and lustful interest in the opposite sex, though he has had an obese girlfriend, Debbie, to which Stan disapproved. Steve's relationship with his father is strained, with Stan often behaving judgmentally and intolerantly over Steve's nerdiness, immaturity, and sensitivity. Steve has been known to cop attitude, sometimes rightfully so at Stan over his offensive acts.

Steve is portrayed as a stereotypical geek. He is a bit of a social outcast, wears thick, black frame glasses, and harbors a strong academic interest in science, especially chemistry. More typically geeky traits of Steve's include his interests in Dungeons & Dragons, Harry Potter, and Star Wars.

Like most unpopular students, Steve is often physically and verbally picked on by the bullies of the more popular social circle. Despite this, he has shown various times throughout the series that he has no issue with being as callous and mean as his tormentors, including towards other victims of bullying at his school, or even younger children.

Steve's father, Stan, is often frustrated with Steve, as he would prefer that Steve engage in activities that would improve his social standing, like sports, a conflict that was first explored in the first-season episode "All About Steve". Stan sometimes attempts to change Steve, usually unsuccessfully, as when he once gave Steve an experimental performance enhancer. The steroid caused Steve to grow female breasts but also ironically made him more popular at school. Steve looks up to his dad as a role model but his naïveté often leads him to follow his dad's advice or convictions, seemingly blindly. This led him to once openly display homophobia. Another time Steve received a failing grade on a presentation about fossils using information he got from Stan because he thought his dad was intelligent, despite Roger's attempts to convince him otherwise.

Steve's mother, Francine, does not care that Steve is a geek, and is more protective of him, seeing him as her "baby", a status she once attempted to prolong by using a special drug to keep him from reaching puberty.

Steve does not share many interests with his sister, Hayley, who often chastises him for his savvy, showman attitude, and general objectification towards women. In turn, Steve also enjoys teasing Hayley for fun because of her sensible nature, which Hayley does not take very well. But the two have occasionally collaborated with each other on schemes, such as when they tried to break up a young couple so Hayley could get the guy and Steve the girl, which ended up backfiring on both of the couple getting horrifically injured. They have also tried to teach both of their parents individual lessons, like when they tried to teach Francine not to be racist, only to learn that she was actually prejudiced against left-handed people, or when they exacted revenge against Stan for turning a homeless shelter into a bumfight business.

Roger and Steve have a close sibling-like friendship, as they often play video games together, get advice from each other, and come up with schemes together. Several episodes' subplots revolve around them, most notably Wheels and the Legman episodes. For example, he once planned to make a Girls Gone Wild-type video and market it in order to generate money to buy a video game console. In another scheme, Steve and Roger ran away to New York City to make their fortunes, while the rest of the family thought they were killed when lightning set the family's treehouse on fire. The two have a love-hate relationship, in which they constantly quarrel and insult each other, mostly because of Steve's tendency to inflate his own ego, combined with Roger's easily irritated and vindictive nature, which often leads the latter to physically abuse or play a prank on Steve because of a real or perceived tease or insult. Occasionally, Steve gets even, like when he once conned Roger out of $50,000. Steve also enjoys teasing Roger from time to time and while Roger is more tolerable about it than Hayley, he also seems to be easily annoyed by Steve. However, Steve and Roger have shown a brotherly affection for each other several times, with Steve even once intervening to rescue the alien from an abusive relationship. In the same episode, it is revealed that Roger was Steve's 5th birthday gift.

Klaus and Steve tend to get along consistently well, in contrast with other members of the family. With the possible exception of Roger, Klaus is the most frequently present member of the main cast in storylines concerning Steve and his friends, playing announcer for them when they wrestle, helping Snot deck out a basement, and telling Steve and Snot German stories. Like Roger, he is often critical of Steve's effeminate mannerisms, at one point asking him if he's "allergic to vaginas".

A freshman at Pearl Bailey High School, Steve is a highly capable musician, having taken up the cello to once impress a girl. In a later episode, however, Steve says that he has been playing the cello since he was nine. Steve also plays guitar and sings, which he did as part of a band in the episode "American Dream Factory." In fact, both of the songs Steve's band rehearses ("Livin' on the Run" and "Sunset Blvd"), were originally recorded by Scott Grimes, who voices Steve. Among Steve's other talents are being able to read Elvish, use Morse code, and communicate with dolphins. Steve is also an accomplished master of disguise through assistance of Roger; and has occasionally relied on the use of Roger's wigs, highly convincing prosthetic masks, and wearing other's clothing to escape difficult situations unnoticed.

While academically skilled, Steve is also quite naïve and not socially savvy. For example, he knows more about the New York Stock Exchange than about prostitution. As a result, he can sometimes be tricked into believing outrageously implausible lies. Roger typically takes advantage of this, especially when he is upset with Steve or when he is simply bored. Once Roger made Steve believe he was not really Stan and Francine's biological child. Another time Roger tricked Steve into believing he was an adolescent wizard, and took him to a drug dealer's house, telling him it was secretly a wizard's school, and the drug lab inside a Potions class.

Although normally even-tempered and relatively tolerant, Steve cries when he is notably upset, but he has also had uncontrolled bursts of rage, during which he breaks nearby objects and screams very loudly. If pressed hard enough, Steve will also hit or attack people, such as when he beat up Beauregard La Fontaine for insulting his father, even though he is generally not aggressive or an adept fighter, as he was unable to even make a fist in "Bully for Steve", for example. He also uses childhood paraphernalia that teenagers have typically outgrown, such as the teddy bear he is implied to sleep with in "Live and Let Fry", and the Care Bears towel he is revealed to use in "Camp Refoogee". In the episode Stan & Francine & Connie & Ted, he twice demonstrates an extreme form of rage which is referred to as 'going bananas', where his face turns bright red, he screams gibberish, flails around, breaks things, and even attacks anyone nearby. His neighbors and friends are well aware of this, as at the end of the first tantrum Greg is seen across the street calmly listening and commenting on it while Barry warns him not to go bananas before he does the second time.

Steve has also been shown to occasionally struggle with both substance abuse and an addiction to power. In "An Apocalypse to Remember", Steve claims to be hooked on "hallucinogenic berries", which ultimately turn out to be poisonous. In a later episode, Steve develops an addiction to the energy drink Cougar Boost, at one point going as far as to defraud his friends with fake tickets in order to obtain money to procure more of the beverage. In the episode Virtual In-Stanity, Francine derides Stan for picking up a drug bunny as a last minute gift, in the process reminding Stan that they just barely got Steve off the heroin from Stan's previous last second gift. In both the pilot episode and You Debt Your Life, Steve demonstrates an addiction to power; in the former case by taking over the school after being turned down by a girl he was trying to impress, in the latter case due to his obsession with making the morning announcements and deciding what is worth broadcasting to the high school. Furthermore, as shown in the episode "Jenny Fromdabloc", it is revealed that among his four friends Steve is considered to be the leader of the group going as far back as elementary school, prompting Roger to call Steve the "King of the Nerds". In most cases when his role as the leader of the group is threatened, Steve's drive to maintain this position of power results in erratic behavior such as humiliating his friends with personal or compromising information or threats of physical violence against himself or others. In nearly every case outside of his immediate circle of friends, Steve's position of power or authority ends up stripped or removed from him, or in rare cases, remains with him in a curtailed capacity, as was the case in "I am the Walrus".

In "Hurricane!", it appeared that Steve might have a fetish for Asians and pregnant women, either separately or even both, when Francine found multiple magazines in Steve's bedroom. "Stanny Slickers II: The Legend of Ollie's Gold" and "Stan Time" also imply that Steve has a fetish for robotic women (in the former episode, he tried to build a date out of a vacuum cleaner and was shown to have a fully functioning female robot in Stan's vision of the future where Stan is famous after death, but everyone makes rude comments about his children being freaks. In the later episode, one of Steve's porno movie ideas depicts two women making out and turning into robots in a hot tub). Steve has pursued many women but he is said to become "super gay" in the future as shown in the episode "Roger Passes the Bar". Steve enjoys going on strolls every Sunday. He calls them his "Sunday Strolls."

== Friends ==
Steve (left), shown without his glasses, after Barry (center) has taken them to complete his Seth Rogen costume, in the 2010 Halloween episode, "Best Little Horror House in Langley Falls". At right is Snot, another of Steve's friends.

Aside from Roger, Steve has a small group of friends from school that he regularly spends time with. The boys frequently engage in activities which most teenage boys have outgrown, such as slumber parties. The group includes:

- Snot, a teenager with curly hair, a wispy moustache, and acne, who is Steve's best friend. His name and appearance is based on Booger from Revenge of the Nerds; with Curtis Armstrong playing both characters. Snot, who is Jewish, once had an affair with Steve's then-girlfriend, Gretchen. It is implied in "Roger Passes The Bar" that Snot has joined the army and turned gay, marrying his commanding officer, LT Randall Santana.
- Barry, a morbidly obese and apparently simple-minded boy, he has an inarticulate, strident, and sloppy vocal quality. In the episode "With Friends Like Steve's" he is revealed to be a maniacal, demonic genius made to take special "vitamins" to inhibit these evil tendencies, which cause mental retardation. Without taking the pills, he also speaks in an English accent. It is implied in "Roger Passes The Bar" that he grows up to become a gay poet working at Ithaca College, dating his male students.
- Toshi, a multilingual Japanese teenager. Although he seems to understand English, he seldom speaks it. When he speaks Japanese (generally with a very condescending tone), Steve believes he can understand him, though he really does not. Toshi has spoken Russian and speaks Spanish when talking on the phone to Francine (though that could be Francine ignorantly thinking Toshi's Japanese is Spanish). Though they are friends, Toshi's greatest wish is to one day kill Steve. Toshi's parents speak perfect English, as does his younger sister, Akiko, who acts as Toshi's translator in episodes such as "Weiner of Our Discontent" and "The Best Little Horror House in Langley Falls". Toshi apparently knows of Roger Smith being an alien as he once called him "that alien in the wig". It is implied in "Roger Passes The Bar" that he has moved to Kyoto, Japan to become an exotic dancer.
