= Stan Smith (American Dad!) =

Fictional character from American Dad!

- American Dad! character
- First appearance: "Pilot" (2005)
- Created by: Seth MacFarlane; Mike Barker; Matt Weitzman
- Designed by: Seth MacFarlane
- Voiced by: Seth MacFarlane

In-universe information
- Full name: Stanford Leonard Smith
- Alias: Papa Wheelie
- Nicknames: The Boob (by the Smith family); Mr. S (by Jeff Fischer); Staniel (by Roger and Francine)
- Occupation: Agent
- Affiliation: Central Intelligence Agency (CIA)
- Family: Jack Smith (father); Betty Smith (mother); Rusty Smith (half-brother)
- Spouse: Francine Smith (wife)
- Children: Hayley Smith (daughter); Steve Smith (son)
- Relatives: Mitch (uncle); Ida (aunt); Glen Smith (nephew)
- Religion: Episcopalian
- Home: Langley Falls, Virginia
- Nationality: American
- Age: 42

Stanford Leonard "Stan" Smith is a fictional character and the main protagonist of the animated television series American Dad! Voiced by the series' co-creator and executive producer, Seth MacFarlane, Stan is the breadwinning patriarch of the Smith family. He is married to Francine, with whom he has two children, Hayley and Steve, and works as an agent for the Central Intelligence Agency, applying the same extreme measures suited and used for his job in his personal life and with his family. Also living under Stan's roof besides his family are four housemates: Roger, an alien and his best friend; Roger's homunculus offspring Rogu; Klaus, the family's man-in-a-fish-body pet; and Jeff Fischer, Hayley's boyfriend turned husband.

Stan, a staunch Republican, was originally written as a satirical take of American conservatives: he is Christian, stereotypically masculine, reckless, insensitive, and hypercompetitive. As the series' focus slowly shifted from societal commentary to character-driven stories, Stan's more satirical traits became a part of the character himself, divorced of their political context, rather than directly critiquing conservatives. In spite of his many flaws, Stan displays a mutually deep love for his family.

== Personality ==
Stan Smith is the exaggeratedly masculine husband of Francine and father of Steve and Hayley. Though Hayley may not be Stan's biological daughter—Francine was revealed to have cheated on Stan at her bachelorette party in the episode "The Kidney Stays in the Picture"—Stan still regards her as such and refused to learn the results of a DNA test. As the Smith family's breadwinner, Stan is an agent for the CIA. Tending to take extreme measures with no regard for others nor potentially disastrous consequences, Stan is portrayed as insanely drastic, endangering, rash, dog-eat-dog, and both inconsiderate and insensitive of others. Stan's mentality is of a staunchly conservative Republican and self-proclaimed American patriot. His conservatism is expressed ludicrously with him often coming off as severely intolerant, self-abnegating, and wrongheaded. All the same however, Stan has numerous alternate ways of taking drastic measures beyond politics. As examples—in the episode "Dope & Faith" when Stan found out one of his friends was an atheist, he tried getting him to pray by blowing up his home, spreading the bird flu at his restaurant, brainwashing his wife into thinking she was a lesbian, and taking his kids away; in the episode "I Can't Stan You", Stan evicted his entire neighborhood and his own family just for overhearing some of his neighbors gossiping about him behind his back; in the episode "Four Little Words", Stan framed his wife as a murderer all so as not to hear her say the words "I told you so"; etc.

=== Troublesome sides and extreme-measure taking ===
Insanely drastic and rashly so, Stan at times acts on his first impulses, which typically result in extreme measures. Often, his extreme measures are of a conspicuously destructive, disastrous, offensive, or life-threatening nature to others. Very selfish and inconsiderate, Stan never stops to think about the feelings, needs, or welfare of others, even in circumstances where others obviously could be or have been negatively impacted. Moreover, Stan often proves to be insensitive, completely unfazed when fully conscious of the distresses, displeasure and sufferings brought upon and felt by others including his very own family. His intentions, generally, are good, but he is often far too irrational to ever acknowledge this or learn any lessons from it.

=== Masculinity ===
Stan is also shown to be very virile and masculine. He often bears out his chest, stands up rigidly straight, and possesses a deep, thick voice quality. Moreover, he has expressed macho beliefs. For example, he has expressed opposition to showing emotion, associating it with being a woman. He once told Steve, "Son, feelings are what women have. They come from their ovaries."

=== Troublesome/redeeming qualities ===
Though Stan typically tries to effect a masculine image and repress his feelings, his emotions, sensitivity, and endearing side still manifest themselves from time to time. For example, on several occasions, it has been revealed that even as an adult Stan has desperately desired the fatherly love and attention that he never got as a child, such as in the episode "American Stepdad" when Roger became his stepfather.

At the same time, however, his incredibly drastic, dog-eat-dog, and inconsiderate qualities tend to show through in combination with his sensitive and redeeming qualities. For example, Hayley once told Stan, "Dad, I've never seen this side of you. It's so sweet." Stan playfully replied, "Well, if you tell anybody I'll kill you." The two laughed together for a moment before Stan suddenly took a serious, browbeating manner and added, "I'm serious, I will kill you. I will reach into your chest, pull out your beating heart and eat it. All of it, every last bit!" He concluded by affectionately stating, "Well, sweet dreams, angel." As another example, in the episode "Oedipal Panties", Stan went to extremes to keep his mother, Betty, from finding a romantic partner for fear he would lose her. In the episode, Stan was revealed to have captured and detained all of Betty's former lovers to an uncharted island.

=== Original persona ===
In the beginning of the series, it was heavily emphasized that Stan was a highly conservative Republican, bordering on right-wing authoritarianism. He idolized then U.S. President George W. Bush and former President Ronald Reagan. Combined with these traits, he was also portrayed as patriotic and Christian. Stan regularly caused havoc and disorder with his bigotry, conservatism, patriotism, chauvinism, xenophobia, and paranoia. MacFarlane has likened Stan's original character to Archie Bunker from All in the Family.

Under his initial persona, he also opposed homosexuality and gay marriage for a time. He changed his views on homosexuality, however, in the episode "Lincoln Lover", once becoming associated with the Log Cabin Republicans. Stan's stance on homosexuality further softened in the episode "Surro-Gate" when Francine acted as a surrogate mother for gay couple Greg and Terry's baby. At the end of this episode, Stan realized what a loving family Greg and Terry were.

After the first few seasons and as the series progressed, Stan was portrayed as growing out of these particular traits and they were largely dropped from his character. Branching out, he later began displaying his wrongheadedness and penchant for taking to extremes in numerous other ways beyond ultra right-wing politics. He has also exhibited instances of gullibility (like his son Steve) such as when he believed he was taking cold medicine when in fact he was smoking "crack" as Roger nonchalantly points out. Hayley has also tricked him into buying mirrored sunglasses that wound up getting him kidnapped by a group of radicals. In another episode, Roger states to Stan that he has to "give" his champion racehorse "a full release", which Stan ultimately does so. Stan has also once drunk Roger's urine due to the alien telling him it was a fancy beer. The episode "Irregarding Steve" reveals that Stan believes that popcorn doesn't pop above sea level. In "Love, AD Style" when Francine points out if they added another "C" before the "K" in the acronym of the new car Stan wants to buy he says he doesn't know what she's talking about, clearly not realizing what the new acronym would spell out. In "Stanny Tendergrass" Stan thought he was able to afford a membership at Mr. Vanderhill's (Roger's) country club after working there thirty years at the cost of seven grand, completely unaware of the vast price inflation cost (two hundred grand).

== Occupation ==
Stan's history can be traced back to 1987 when he was 24. He joined the army and quickly rose to become an Airborne Ranger, and eventually being selected to join the army's elite anti-terrorist group, Delta Force. After leaving the army, he was again elected to undergo extensive special forces training to join the CIA's ultra-secretive Special Activities Division, specifically the Special Operations Group.

When he was wounded on a top-secret mission inside North Korea, Stan returned home to a desk job. Stan is now an official officer of the CIA. Stan has shown expertise and knowledge in hand-to-hand combat, small arms, covert surveillance methods, torture, the ability to fly aircraft and the handling of assault weapons. Even though he has been arrested several times on several felony charges, such as animal cruelty, child pornography (though this was a wrongful accusation), attempted murder, drug trafficking, possession and use of crack cocaine (he almost flees to South America), transporting infected cattle to be slaughtered for food, impersonating a U.S. Marshal, and identity theft, he retains his official position.

Though it is well known he works for the CIA, very little is actually known about what exactly he does; and, as a result of this ambiguity, Stan's job in any given episode tends to be conducive of whatever CIA skill set is convenient for a given episode's plot. At various times in the series, he has been shown to work as a CIA analyst, an agency bureaucrat, a field agent, and a special forces operative; additionally, he has held a number of different titles during his time with the CIA, including (but not limited to) "Deputy-Deputy Director of the CIA ("Bullocks to Stan")" and "Deputy Under-Director of Missing Foreign Agents" ("Red October Sky"). Usually he is seen working in a small cork-walled cubicle with a few of his buddies: Jackson, Sanders, Dick Reynolds, and others. Smith's assumption of these different roles may indicate that he works as a sort of troubleshooter, taking on different responsibilities as required. However, since assuming the role of Deputy Deputy Director, his duties do not appear to have changed.

In the episode "Chimdale", it is revealed that Stan Smith has been bald since college and wears a wig (however, this episode contradicts several past episodes, including "Frannie 911", in which Roger scalped Stan while role playing as an American Indian, and "Choosy Wives Choose Smith", in which Stan's hair grew after spending months on a deserted island). He drives a black Ford Explorer but has also been seen driving a black Chrysler 300C and owns a DeLorean despite not having seen or even knowing about the movie Back to the Future. Later in the series, he buys a red C6 Chevrolet Corvette to deal with the fact that he could possibly be a grandfather, which he continues to drive when not in the Explorer. Stan is also known to have an unexplained fear of seagulls, first mentioned by Francine in "American Dream Factory", although he got over it in "Choosy Wives Choose Smith".

Despite his traditional values, he has been married to two other women. In Saudi Arabia, Stan married an Arab woman and named her "Thundercat" because he could not pronounce her name, though Stan married her mainly as a servant. At one point, Francine divorced Stan so that he could have pointless sex, and he met and married a woman named Joanna, but went back to Francine, though Stan reports that he did consummate the marriage. Both Stan and Francine admit that each married the other for what Stan describes as selfish reasons. That is, that Stan admits that he married Francine because she was attractive. Francine, for her part, says that she wants someone to take care of her financially and both go so far as to admit this during their vow renewal ceremony to a room full of people. In the episode "Stan's Food Restaurant", it is revealed that Stan is originally from Philadelphia.

== Hobbies ==
Stan also enjoys a number of hobbies. Among them are collecting Franklin Mint Plates, designing and making themed stuffed bears, fly-tying, gun cleaning, wood burning, figure skating, and writing right-wing children's literature. He also enjoys reading books about the things he is doing at that very moment (i.e. he was reading a book called "Reading While Waiting", as he waited for someone). Other examples include "How to Do a Spit Take", "How to Furrow Your Brow", "How to Look Chastened", "How to Read With One Hand", and "Anticipating Doorbells". He is also a fan of the Washington major league sports teams, especially the Commanders and Nationals, as the show takes place a few miles near Washington, D.C. Stan is a fond of Quiznos, and this is revealed in the episode 42-Year Old Virgin.

== Cameo appearances ==
- Stan appears alongside Avery Bullock in the Family Guy episode "Lois Kills Stewie", and Stewie Griffin mistakes Stan for Joe Swanson due to their large chins.
- Stan makes a brief cameo in the Family Guy episode "Excellence in Broadcasting", commending Brian Griffin for becoming a conservative.
- Stan and his family appear in Family Guy in the episode "Bigfat" and Peter Griffin also mistakes him for Joe for their large chins.
- Stan and his family later appear again in Family Guy, this time as brief, silent background characters in one scene of the episode, "No Giggity, No Doubt".
- Stan, Francine, and Roger also makes an appearance in the near end of the Family Guy episode, "The Movement", where Meg Griffin was traded by Peter's request to American Dad!, and during her singing the show's theme song, she is interrupted by Stan by commanding her, "Shut Up Meg!"
- In the season 17 episode of The Simpsons, "The Italian Bob", Stan, along with Peter Griffin from Family Guy, can be glimpsed in an Italian sheriff's police book of criminal offenders. Peter Griffin is dubbed "Plagiarismo" (faux Italian for Plagiarism) and Stan is dubbed "Plagiarismo di Plagiarismo" (Plagiarism of Plagiarism).
- Stan and his family appear in The Simpsons episode, "Homerland", as guests into the season 25 premiere.
- Stan makes a brief cameo as a background character in one panel of the 2007 Futurama comic, "Futurama Returns".
- A bobblehead of Stan can be seen in the Mad episode "Garfield of Dreams".
- Stan appears as an operator in Call of Duty: Black Ops 6 as part of a bundle released on July 17, 2025.
- In July 2026, Stan and Francine appeared in an American Dad! Fortnite bundle along with two back blings and an emote.
