= Francine Smith =

Fictional character from American Dad!

- American Dad! character
- First appearance: "Pilot" (2005)
- Created by: Seth MacFarlane; Mike Barker; Matt Weitzman
- Designed by: Seth MacFarlane
- Voiced by: Wendy Schaal

In-universe information
- Full name: Francine Lee Smith
- Aliases: Amanda Lane; Sarah Blanch; Frank from Chicago; The Beaver; Laurence Fishburne
- Gender: Female
- Occupation: Housewife; Real estate agent (formerly)
- Family: Adoptive family: Bàba Ling (father); Māma Ling (mother); Gwen Ling (sister); Birth parents: Nicholas Dawson (father); Cassandra Dawson (mother)
- Spouse: Stan Smith
- Children: Hayley Smith (daughter); Steve Smith (son); Libby Corbin-Bates (surrogate daughter)
- Relatives: Beverley (aunt); Karen (aunt)
- Religion: Episcopalian
- Home: Langley Falls, Virginia
- Nationality: American

Francine Lee Smith (formerly Ling; née Dawson) is a fictional character on the American animated sitcom American Dad!. She is married to the main character, Stan Smith and the mother of Hayley and Steve Smith. Francine is voiced by Wendy Schaal.

Early in the series, Francine is often seen as the voice of reason in her dysfunctional family, adopting the stereotypical role of the long-suffering wife or doting mother. However, as the show progresses, her backstory develops with allusions to unconventional and surreal activities, including working for strip clubs, underground fighting rings, cult memberships, multiple murders, and substance abuse.

== Character biography ==
In the series, Francine was born to a wealthy couple from South Carolina, Francine's birth parents – Nicholas and Cassandra Dawson – gave her up when she was a baby so they could be upgraded to first class on a flight in "Big Trouble in Little Langley". Daddy issues stemming from her unstable relationship with her birth father led to her losing her virginity at a young age and engaging in risky sexual behaviors, such as her affinity for combining drugs and alcohol with unprotected sex with strangers as seen in season one's "Finances with Wolves" and Season 15 "Stan & Francine & Connie & Ted".

During the course of the show, not much is known about Francine's younger years beyond the fact that she was brought up in a Roman Catholic orphanage where she was taught that left-handed people were the Devil's minions in "Office Spaceman". Her left handedness was literally beaten out of her by the nuns, as they would regularly beat her with a side of beef and a big fish on Fridays whenever she used her left hand. At the age of seven, she was adopted by a Chinese American couple, Bàba and Māma Ling, making her maiden name Ling. She considers herself Chinese because she was raised by the Lings. She speaks fluent Chinese, often with her parents to disguise their conversations in front of her husband Stan if he becomes a topic of discussion. Through her adopted Chinese parents, Francine has a sister named Gwen.

Francine developed a fanatical crush on her algebra teacher, Mr. Feeny. When she was found hiding in his closet by his wife, the police were called. Francine lied and said they were in a relationship. He was sentenced to jail, where he committed suicide.

Francine casually recalls a sexual encounter with a group of popular girls in the school showers to Stan in "1600 Candles". "One day, when I was showering after gym class, these mean pretty girls caught me and kept scrubbing me all over with soap. I mean, they didn't miss a spot! And even though we were all wet and naked and slippery, they were still able to get me on all fours, and shove my face to the floor! Can you imagine, Stan?”

While in college in the show, Francine stabbed her roommate to death. In "Family Affair", she nonchalantly admits to the crime and expresses surprise that no one in the family knew about it beforehand. During her college years, Francine also developed a reputation as the number-one party girl on campus, largely due to campus legend. She also became a successful entrepreneur, creating the website franny.com, which featured amateur adult photos and videos of herself. However, later in the series, in "The Devil Wears a Lapel Pin", it is established that Francine never attended college. Given her candid admission to Roger, her earlier stories were likely fabricated to make her past sound more exciting, perhaps as a way to cope with regret or to feel more fulfilled.

In the late 80s she was a prolific groupie, sleeping with Adam Ant and Billy Gibbons of ZZ Top, and Dexys Midnight Runners among others. It was during this time that she met Stan, who had just graduated from the CIA academy. The couple met when Francine was hitchhiking drunkenly from a Duran Duran concert and Stan pulled over to give her a lift. During the drive, while enthusiastically feeling up the semi conscious Francine, Stan unsuccessfully attempted to swerve to avoid hitting a raccoon and jarring Francine awake. To put the raccoon out of its misery, Stan shot the animal, causing Francine to become attracted to Stan for the compassion he had shown. This is the key to the plan in "Francine's Flashback" to get her memory back.

Francine quickly sized Stan up as a boring, yet capable financial provider, able to offer a stable and protected life. She cut off her wild life cold turkey without Stan ever knowing about her promiscuity, and the couple married soon after. Although Francine seems to hold very liberal beliefs, she keeps them mostly to herself and apparently follows her husband's conservative values.

Before meeting Stan she had a brief acting career in an episode of the television show Scarecrow and Mrs. King with George Clooney, in the episode, "Tears of a Clooney". George stole her only line in the show, ruining her acting career. Since that time she has carried an obsession bordering on insanity to kill him, or at least, make him cry.

== Personality ==
During the show, she enjoys being a housewife, but Francine also occasionally yearns for more fulfillment. She was briefly a successful realtor and became a surgeon for an organized-crime syndicate made up of handicapped people. She owns a muffin kiosk at the Langley Falls mall in "Finances With Wolves". When Stan refuses to use any of his CIA bonus money to help her bankroll the store, Francine takes $5,000 out of it without consulting him. She is offered additional investment by an Earth Wind and Fire cover band singer, and agrees to discuss it with him during a meal. What Francine did not know was that her wannabe-financier was actually Klaus in a new body, hoping to seduce her.

At one point in the show, she once joined an ultra-chic local ladies club by faking an affair with a valet. She was saved from the murderous Lady Bugs by her neighbor Linda Memari.

Francine maintains a "Sex Garden" in honor of all her sexual trysts in "When a Stan Loves a Woman". A garden stretching as far as the eye can see contains a single rose bush for each of her previous lovers. When showing the garden to Stan, it's revealed that guided tours of the garden take place, and there is rumored to be a tribe of natives that have never seen a white man living deep in the garden.

While she drinks wine, and occasionally smokes cigarettes, Francine is an aficionado of marijuana, cocaine, ecstasy and Ambien, to the point where she steals $50 each week from the family budget to support her habit. As seen in "Dr. Klaustus", when in need of more funds, she enters amateur night contests at seedy strip clubs as in "N.S.A. (No Snoops Allowed)".

Throughout the course of the show, Francine is comfortable with weapons, though whether or not this is because she is married to Stan is never established. She came to realize in "Casino Normale" that she becomes sexually excited when a loaded gun is placed to her temple. She is shown to carry machetes with her in the pilot and has pulled a gun on Stan on more than one occasion. She was also able to make a weapon out of a government-issued rubber shoe Roger had to wear as part of his stint as a prison therapist.

While initially portrayed as a devoted housewife and unconditionally loving mother who tries to have her family bond with one another, Francine's morality slowly deteriorates in later seasons. She talks insultingly and heartlessly of others, including her own children, proving herself just as selfish and shallow as her husband.

There are times in the show when Francine has demonstrated that she might be mentally unstable, including her vendetta against George Clooney and her extreme empty nest syndrome. In "Family Affair" she nonchalantly admits she stabbed her college roommate to death and expresses surprise that no one in the family knew before. In "Max Jets" she is visibly excited by the idea of Charles Manson being released from jail and "finishing what he started". In "Live and Let Fry" she tells Hayley that she can't handle much, and when someone rings the doorbell she screams, "It's too much!". She also becomes violent and angry seemingly at random, one point sweeping Klaus' bowl onto the floor screaming 'Humans are talking!' because he interrupted her. Similarly, in the episode "Stan of Arabia: Part 2," Francine resorts to physical violence when challenging Stan's Arabian wife, Thundercat, for Stan's affection; saying "you want to dance bitch; then let's dance" and proceeds to fight her reasonably well. In "Every Which Way But Lose", Francine also admits that she doesn't know how to vote as it confuses her too much. She just enters a booth, waits ten seconds, then comes out and yells "Democracy!"

== Age ==
Francine was originally 39 years old in the series, but she celebrates her 39th birthday in the 2006 episode "Tears of a Clooney". The episode begins on her birthday, follows her year-long attempt to get revenge on George Clooney, and ends on her 40th birthday. In "Shallow Vows", her birthday is revealed to be September 26, placing her under the zodiac sign Libra.

== Other appearances ==
In July 2026, Francine and Stan appeared in an American Dad! Fortnite bundle along with two back blings and an emote.
