= Matt Weitzman =

American producer and writer (born 1967)

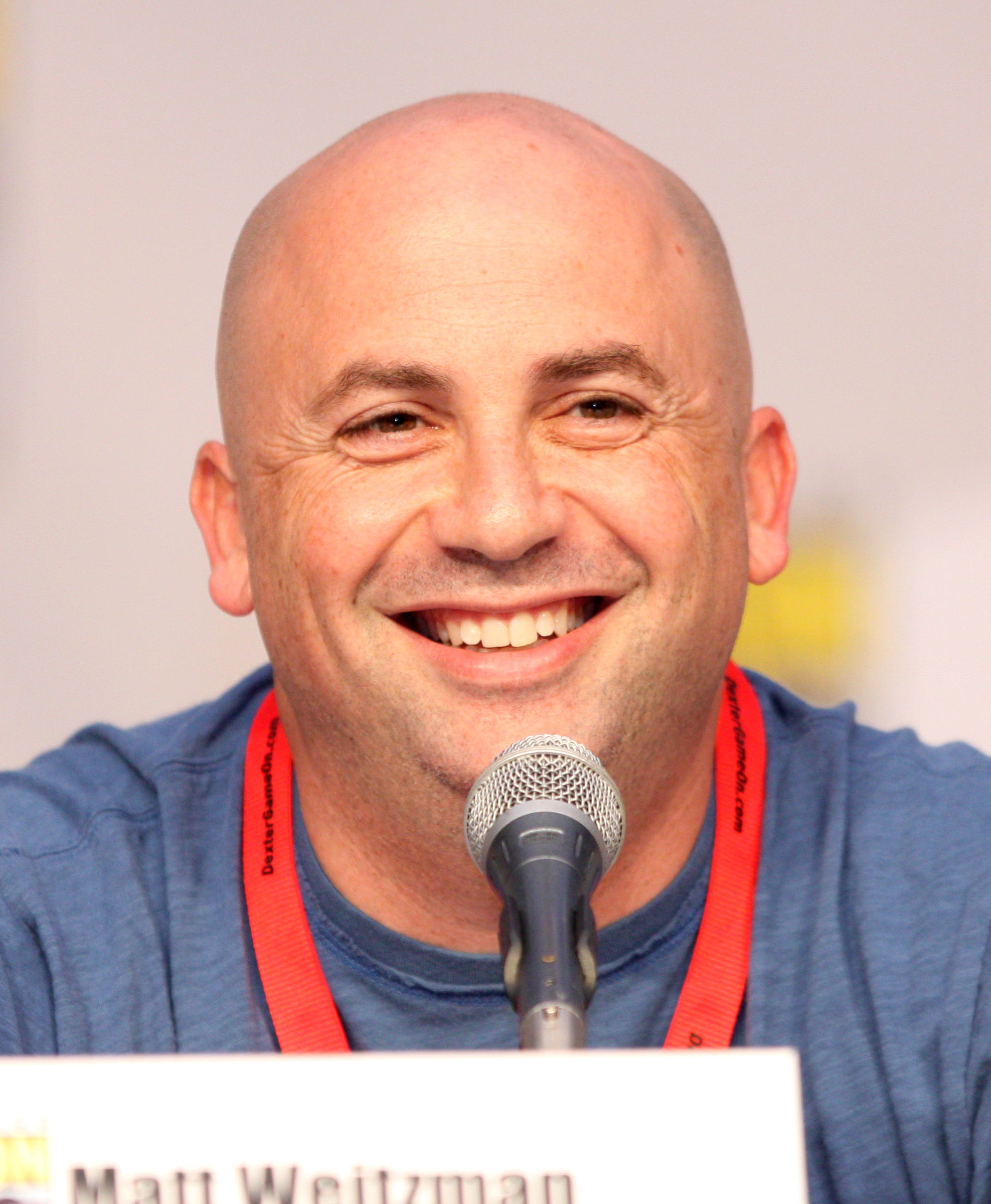
- Matt Weitzman at the 2010 Comic Con in San Diego.
- Born: Matthew E. Weitzman; November 13, 1967 (age 58); Los Angeles, California, U.S.
- Years active: 1993–present
- Spouse: Tessa Boam

Matthew E. Weitzman (born November 13, 1967) is an American producer and writer. He was one of the creators of American Dad! along with Seth MacFarlane and Mike Barker; he serves as the sole showrunner for American Dad. Barker and Weitzman were originally writers for Family Guy.

Weitzman has written on ten television shows, including Daddy Dearest, Off Centre and Damon.

== Biography ==
Matt Weitzman was born in Los Angeles, California and is Jewish. He attended American University, where he became a brother of Alpha Epsilon Pi,.

Weitzman co-created American Dad! and was an original writer on Family Guy, a contributor on PJ's and Father of the Pride.

In the New Kids on the Block cartoon, he voiced the animated version of Jonathan Knight, but was credited under the name of Matt E. Mixer.

He is married to Tessa Weitzman, daughter of screenwriter, Jeffrey Boam.

In 2000, Weitzman was nominated for an Emmy for his work on Family Guy. Then in 2009 and 2012, American Dad! was nominated for an Emmys. In 2006, American Dad! was nominated for a GLAAD excellence in television award.

== See also ==
- American Dad!
  - "Pilot" (American Dad!)
  - "Stan Knows Best"
