= Mike Barker (producer) =

American producer and writer

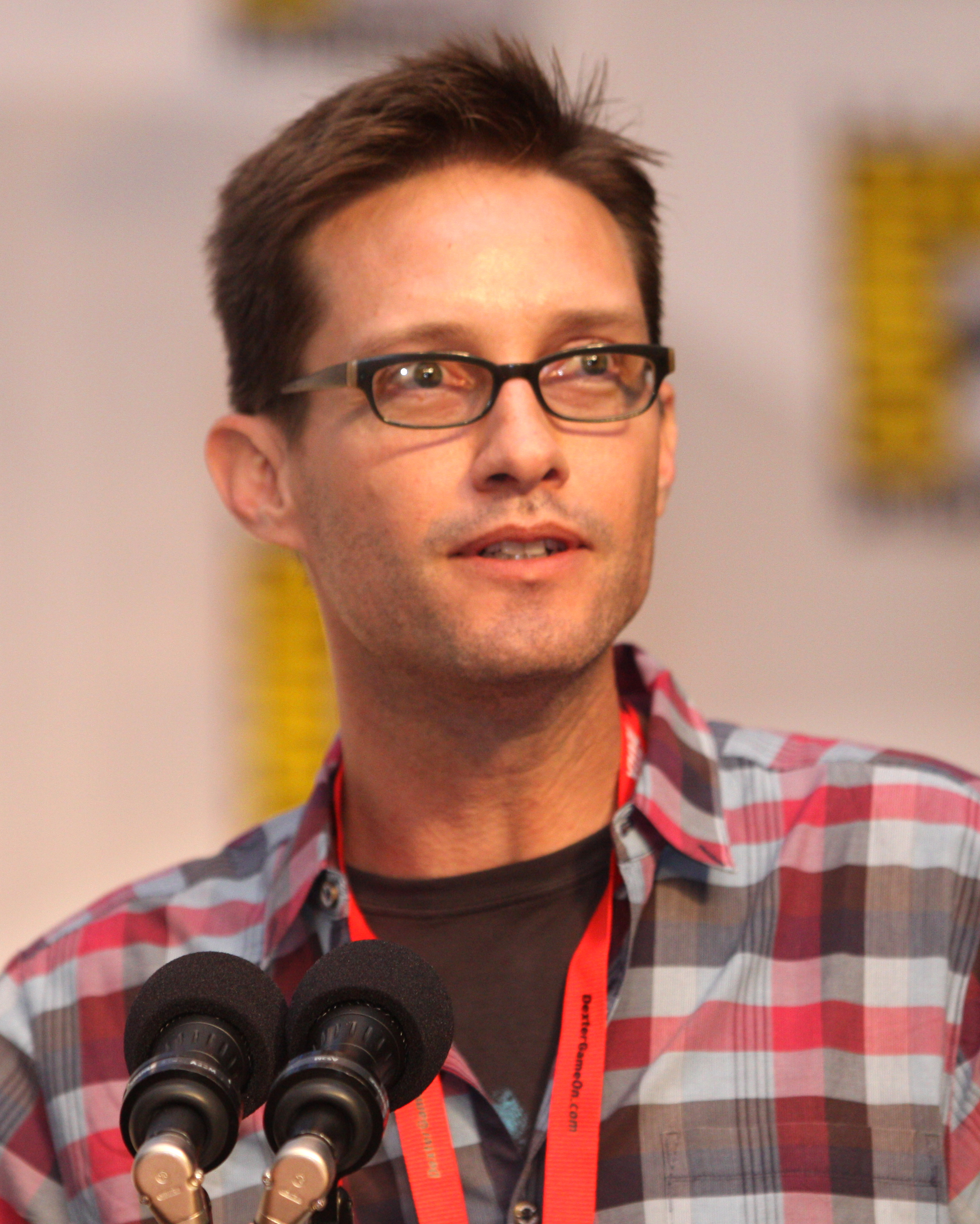
- Barker at the 2010 San Diego Comic-Con
- Born: Michael Barker
- Occupations: Television writer, producer, voice actor
- Years active: 1999–2013

Michael Barker is an American producer, writer and former voice actor best known for his work on the Fox adult animated television series Family Guy and American Dad!. He did voices for both shows and is the co-creator and one of the showrunners of the latter.

== Career ==
Mike Barker worked with Seth MacFarlane and Matt Weitzman as a writer and producer on early seasons of Family Guy. He has also voiced some of the characters on Family Guy and American Dad!, most notably Terry Bates, the gay local co-anchorperson.

In 2003, MacFarlane presented to Barker an idea for a new adult animated series. It revolved around a conservative father and his liberal hippie daughter. Barker accepted the offer to develop the series with MacFarlane and Weitzman. Barker also provided voice work for the series. MacFarlane has credited Barker and Weitzman with American Dad!'s success and longevity, stating that the two of them have been in charge of creative direction over the series since its beginning.

It was announced on November 4, 2013, that Barker had departed American Dad! after 10 seasons with the program, leaving Weitzman as the series' sole showrunner. Barker remained under an overall contract with 20th Century Fox Television.
