= List of American Dad! characters =

The main characters of the show. From left to right: Roger, Francine, Stan, Klaus, Hayley and Steve.

This article lists characters from the animated series American Dad!.

== Voice cast ==
Cast members
Seth MacFarlane	Wendy Schaal	Scott Grimes	Rachael MacFarlane	Dee Bradley Baker	Jeff Fischer
Stan Smith, Roger, Greg Corbin	Francine Smith	Steve Smith	Hayley Smith	Klaus Heisler, Rogu	Jeff Fischer

The voice actors are not assembled as a group when performing the lines of their characters; rather, each of the voice actors perform their lines privately. The voice actors have stated that because of their personalities and tendency to goof off when together as a group, they would never get anything completed if they performed their lines collectively.

== Appearances ==
Character	Voice actor	Appearances																				
Character	Voice actor	1	2	3	4	5	6	7	8	9	10	11	12	13	14	15	16	17	18	19	20	21
Main characters
Stan Smith	Seth MacFarlane	Main	Main	Main	Main	Main	Main	Main	Main	Main	Main	Main	Main	Main	Main	Main	Main	Main	Main	Main	Main	Main
Roger	Seth MacFarlane	Main	Main	Main	Main	Main	Main	Main	Main	Main	Main	Main	Main	Main	Main	Main	Main	Main	Main	Main	Main	Main
Francine Smith	Wendy Schaal	Main	Main	Main	Main	Main	Main	Main	Main	Main	Main	Main	Main	Main	Main	Main	Main	Main	Main	Main	Main	Main
Steve Smith	Scott Grimes	Main	Main	Main	Main	Main	Main	Main	Main	Main	Main	Main	Main	Main	Main	Main	Main	Main	Main	Main	Main	Main
Hayley Smith	Rachael MacFarlane	Main	Main	Main	Main	Main	Main	Main	Main	Main	Main	Main	Main	Main	Main	Main	Main	Main	Main	Main	Main	Main
Klaus Heisler	Dee Bradley Baker	Main	Main	Main	Main	Main	Main	Main	Main	Main	Main	Main	Main	Main	Main	Main	Main	Main	Main	Main	Main	Main
Rogu	Dee Bradley Baker															Guest	Main	Main	Main	Main	Main	Main
Jeff Fischer	Jeff Fischer	Recurring	Recurring	Recurring	Recurring	Recurring	Recurring	Recurring	Main	Main	Guest		Recurring	Main	Main	Main	Main	Main	Main	Main	Main	Main

== Main characters ==
=== Stan Smith ===
Stanford Leonard "Stan" Smith (voiced by Seth MacFarlane) is the title character on American Dad! who has an exaggeratedly masculine voice and manner about him. Stan is Francine's husband and Hayley and Steve's father. Hayley may or may not be Stan's biological daughter since Francine revealed to have cheated on Stan at a bachelorette party in the episode "The Kidney Stays in the Picture", but Stan regards Hayley as his daughter. As the Smith family breadwinner, Stan is a CIA agent. Early on in the series, Stan was exaggeratedly patriotic and Conservative. His character, however, has progressed over the course of the series from the ultra right-wing it had been. All the same however, Stan has proven to be drastic and extreme in numerous other ways beyond politics. He is often shown rashly taking extreme measures in ways that are conspicuously destructive, disastrous, and life-threatening to others. Making his extreme-measure taking worse, Stan is utterly inconsiderate and insensitive, thus he does not stop to think of how others are negatively impacted, nor does he care. As examples of this: in the episode "Dope & Faith" when Stan found out one of his friends was an atheist, he tried getting him to pray by blowing up his home, spreading the bird flu at his restaurant, brainwashing his wife into thinking she was a lesbian, and taking his kids away; in the episode "I Can't Stan You", Stan evicted his entire neighborhood and his own family just for overhearing some of his neighbors gossiping about him behind his back; in the episode "Four Little Words", Stan framed his wife as a murderer all so as not to hear her say the words "I told you so"; etc. Not a stranger to going to any and all lengths to achieve his desired ends—even to the point of shamelessly harming others—Stan is characterized as very dog-eat-dog. Aside from his thoughtlessly drastic and endangering behaviors, he has an endearing, kinder, and sensitive side as well. It has been revealed that he very much desires fatherly love and attention but has always lacked this. Stan's parents separated when he was very young (later learned because of Stan himself in the episode "Blood Crieth Unto Heaven"); thus he has a father (Jack Smith) who was not around much and mistreated him.

=== Francine Smith ===
Francine Lee Smith (née Ling, voiced by Wendy Schaal) is Stan's wife and the mother of Steve and Hayley. Indignant, Francine can usually be seen nagging and scolding her family (particularly Stan) over their wrongdoings. Francine often nags at her family to uphold certain virtues and over any unwholesome or reprehensible behaviors they engage in. Ironically, it is mostly in the midst of all her moralizing and urging others to do the right thing that she demonstrates blatant inappropriateness, indecorum, and inelegance. Sporadically while engaged in moralizing others, Francine will randomly throw in remarks and behaviors that are in bad taste and lack all propriety. Adding to her paradoxical nature, Francine's behaviors have been known to become downright immoral and sometimes even fiendish, all the while trying to get others to live more wholesomely and do what is right. For example, in the episode "The Boring Identity", Francine made efforts to get Stan to be a more civilized and respectable husband. In the process, she deceived him into thinking he was an entirely different person after he got struck with amnesia. Another example, in the episode "Can I Be Frank With You", Francine was disgruntled by the fact that she and Stan were not a closer couple. To achieve this, she encroached in on Stan's guys' night using a male disguise that could fart for extended periods of time. Francine has also been shown to have a randomly wacky and peculiar side. For example, in the episode "The Scarlett Getter", while Francine was engaged in an angry rant about Stan, she stated "Those two are stuck on each other like gum on a hot summer sidewalk on a summer afternoon. I'm sorry, I'm taking a creative writing class."

=== Hayley Smith ===
Hayley Dreamsmasher Smith–Fischer (voiced by Rachael MacFarlane) is Stan and Francine's new-age hippie daughter and college-aged oldest and the sister of Steve. As revealed in the episode "The Kidney Stays in the Picture", she may or may not be Stan's biological daughter, Francine revealed to have cheated on Stan at a bachelorette party; nonetheless, Stan regards her as his daughter. One to stand up for her beliefs, Hayley is passionate, insistent and vocal in her convictions. In mentality, she is portrayed as Liberal, what was originally intended to be the antithesis to her father's ultra-conservative mentality. These character traits were particularly emphasized in the show's beginnings back when Hayley was a focal character in the program; however, they were heavily toned down after early seasons. Intuitive and insightful, Hayley is able to instinctively grasp the hidden, inner, and obscure nature of situations. As examples, in the episode "Stan Knows Best", she is able to see through Stan's disguise as a Russian communist, and instantly upon entering the room in the episode "Finger Lenting Good", Hayley realizes what Stan and Steve are up to in trying to get Jeff to hug them so as to lose his finger for engaging in a vice. As another example, in the episode "Da Flippity Flop" when the essence of Klaus has entered Stan's body and taken control over it, he attempts to deceive Hayley and Francine into thinking he is truly Stan; however, Hayley instantaneously and lackadaisically acknowledges that it is Klaus. Hayley can also be casually rude and insulting, particularly towards her brother, Steve. Several story arcs have been used with regards to Hayley's romantic relationship to Jeff. Back when the two were dating, they had several breakups. In one of their breakups, Hayley dated an urban black man in a koala body (Reginald the Koala) across a string of episodes. Since then, Hayley has married Jeff but continues to live under her parents' roof.

=== Steve Smith ===
Steven Anita "Steve" Smith (voiced by Scott Grimes) is the baby of the family who is Stan and Francine's high-school aged son and the brother of Hayley. He attends Pearl Bailey High School. There have been three versions of the "Steve" character over the course of American Dad! The first version was a one-off execution limited to the unaired precursory pilot (not to be confused with the season premiere episode entitled "Pilot"). This original version of Steve stood out as most contrasting and atypical, particularly in appearance and voice. In this precursor pilot, he was voiced by Ricky Blitt. Here, he was much nerdier, gawkier, and scrawnier than his later versions. By the series premiere, Scott Grimes began voicing the character. Also by the series premiere, Steve became taller, thicker, manlier and more mature than before, though still nerdy. By Steve's third design, he was made softer, more emotional, cuter, and more endearing than before. Despite his wimpy and nerdy characteristics, Steve is particularly conceited and obnoxious. Along with this, he often proves to be a showman, always ready to put on a performance and show off his abilities, often singing-wise. Steve shows great ambition and enthusiasm for his various interests and pursuits. He possesses a keen interest in the opposite sex and has had an obese girlfriend, Debbie, who Stan disapproved of. Steve's relationship with his father is strained with Stan often behaving judgmentally and intolerantly over Steve's nerdiness, immaturity, and sensitivity. Steve has been known to cop attitude, sometimes rightfully so at Stan over his offensive acts. Steve has three best friends: Snot (with whom he shares a bromance), Toshi, and Barry.

=== Roger ===
Roger (voiced by Seth MacFarlane) is the very zany pansexual alien who lives in the Smith family's attic. Blithely so, Roger is depraved, devious, and cruel. He typically exhibits a lighthearted, carefree temperament while also engaged in his freakish grossness, outrageous malice, and rascally shenanigans. Having no limits on his shocking and brazen ways, Roger typically says and does anything and everything that comes to his mind.

Initially being banned by the family from going into the public and often being depressive because of that in early episodes, Roger later begins to be shown to assume different aliases and has a carousel of seemingly endless costumes, which allows him to do almost everything he wants. Everyone outside the Smith family is fooled by his disguises, and each family member has a persona that they do not see through.

=== Klaus Heissler ===
Klaus Heissler (voiced by Dee Bradley Baker in a German accent) is the Smith family's hapless and saturnine goldfish. He is consultative and full of sage advice, sometimes even wearing glasses and taking on a scholarly appearance. Klaus was once an East German Olympic ski-jumper until his mind was transferred into the body of a goldfish during the 1986 Winter Olympics by the CIA to prevent him from winning the gold medal, leaving him permanently trapped in the goldfish's body. Klaus has yet to come to terms with what happened, at times malcontent and gloomy. Not confined to his fishbowl, Klaus is often seen uniquely scooting himself about the Smith residence, reclined in a glass of water. In these moments, it is only his very lower back that is actually in the water. In the early going, Klaus had an obsessive crush on Francine and often made sexual advances at her. For much of the series discounting its beginnings, the Smith family and particularly Roger have been shown to treat Klaus with disdain, take him for granted, and even mistreat him. Ironically, Klaus started out on the series as a bully, known for his ridicule and cruel teasing of all the show's main characters, particularly Roger.

=== Jeff Fischer ===
Jeff Fischer (voiced by Jeff Fischer) is Hayley's slacker, mellow, hippie, henpecked, often stoned boyfriend and later husband. An unemployed high school dropout with (initially) no apparent skills, or employment motivation, he tends to be emasculated, weak-willed, pathetic and frequently behaves naively. Jeff is often shown to be infatuated with Hayley's mother, Francine, having made subtle passes at her on many occasions. Jeff's own mother abandoned him early on, giving birth to him in a van, within which he lives until moving in with the Smiths. His relationship with his father, Henry, is abysmal, with Henry viewing and treating Jeff as a failure. Before moving in with the Smiths, Jeff lived from his van, which he had parked in front of the Smiths' residence when he started dating Hayley. In the episode "Joint Custody" however, Jeff moves in with the Smiths as a result of Stan having a demolition crew crush his van into smithereens with a wrecking ball. Stan effected this in an effort to get Jeff away from his [Stan] property. Throughout the series, Hayley repeatedly dumps Jeff for being a needy, clingy pushover, leaving Jeff crushed until their inevitable reconciliations. This ultimately leads to Jeff dumping Hayley in "Pulling Double Booty" (which is followed by Hayley going on a rampage through the mall), though they reconcile in "Bully for Steve". In the one-hundredth episode, the two marry.

In season 9's "Naked to the Limit, One More Time", Jeff learns that Roger is an alien. As a result, Stan says that he must kill either Roger or Jeff to protect his family. Roger, however, says that he will call his fellow aliens to take him back to his birth planet; however, Roger switches Jeff into the spaceship while he stays behind on Earth. In "Lost in Space", Jeff escapes from an alien spaceship and starts to make his way back to Earth.

In the Season 10 episode "Longest Distance Relationship", Jeff is able to communicate with Hayley through a CB radio and discovers a way to return to earth through a wormhole. Jeff, accompanied by Sinbad's Ghost, arrives 60 years in the future and learns that he cost her a chance to have a great life with Millionaire Matt Davis. Unhappy with having upset the family and giving the elderly Hayley a heart attack, he and Sinbad's Ghost return through the wormhole. Jeff tells the again-young Hayley to move on with her life.

In "Holy Shit, Jeff's Back!" (season 12), it is revealed that Jeff was killed by aliens and his body dissected, before an alien disguised as Jeff is sent to Earth to capture Stan. The alien later has Jeff's brain planted into his body so he can remain on Earth with Hayley as Jeff. In "Portrait of Francine's Genitals" (season 14), Jeff reveals he took Hayley's last name, making him Jeff Smith, though is contradicted two seasons later in "Downtown". Later in the season, in "Roger's Baby", Jeff is reborn as a human, via Roger eating his brain and rebirthing him.

In the season 19 episode "Book of Fischer", Jeff writes in a sketchbook to remember his thoughts but later leaves the book in the freezer and forgets it. In the future, his sketchbook is discovered, and a religion forms out of it.

=== Rogu ===
Rogu (voiced by Dee Bradley Baker) – A homunculus that formed from Roger's tumor in "Persona Assistant" and since then lives in the Smith house. Roger treats him like a son, and he often acts as his alien father's sidekick and assistant. Rogu has an omnivore diet, strange abilities and bodily functions like Roger, and speaks in slow, simplistic English—despite being able to speak at a normal pace—as women find it attractive.

=== Steve's best friends ===
Steve's friend group. From left to right: Toshi, Snot, Barry and Steve.

- Schmuley "Snot" Lonstein (voiced by Curtis Armstrong) – Steve's best friend with whom he shares a bromance. A mustached and acne-covered Jew, Snot is physically modeled after the character his voice actor played, Dudley "Booger" Dawson, in the Revenge of the Nerds films. Since Snot was a toddler and throughout much of the series, he had a crush on Hayley; however, in "The Missing Kink", when Hayley finally succumbs to Snot's advances and began to desire him romantically, Snot lost interest and deceived her into thinking he was gay, claiming it was the act of pursuing her that aroused him. He speaks Klingon, and can read Quenya. Like Steve, he has a fetish for octogenarian women. His parents are poor, as they were unable to afford a bar mitzvah celebration, although Steve pays for one in an attempt to apologize when Snot is falsely accused of theft. His parents have him see a therapist, who is implied to engage with him inappropriately and romantically. Steve reveals that Snot's father left the family and may have been abusive towards his mother. Although generally considered Steve's best friend, he is quite fickle in this role, having cheated with Steve's girlfriends and pelted him with apples during a period where Steve was in a brace for scoliosis in order to gain social acceptance. When Snot and Steve were younger, they solved mysteries together, but Snot refused to help Steve figure out one mystery, as he quit when "the case of the missing bike horn turned into a double rape homicide". Snot appears to be the least eccentric of Steve's clique. It is also revealed in the episode "Wiener of our Discontent" that he can somewhat understand Toshi; Toshi exclaims "Oh, my God", and Snot replies "I think you mean 'oh, my Godzilla'."
- Toshi Yoshida (voiced by Daisuke Suzuki) – Steve's Japanese American sansei friend. Though he understands English perfectly, he always speaks Japanese with subtitles. A running gag is everyone misunderstanding Toshi, assuming he has said something completely different from or contrary to what he has actually said. Toshi studies Russian in order to impress an attractive mail-order bride named Svetlana in "Of Ice and Men". He is mischievous, and sometimes cruel and anti-American. Toshi has expressed the desire to kill Steve as his greatest wish, and he claims to have killed before. In "Best Little Horror House in Langley Falls", Toshi used a katana to kill a group of serial murderers chasing the Smiths. Toshi has demonstrated that he is the only character outside the Smith family able to see through Roger's disguises, describing him as "the alien in the wig". Toshi has a sister named Akiko, who acts as a translator. Despite his apparent inability to speak English, his mother, father, and sister speak fluent English (with his mother even mentioning that she does not even know Japanese). However, in "A Roger Story", he revealed that he does in fact speak fluent English and has the whole time. Toshi speaks English for the first time in "A Piñata Named Desire" after Snot angrily smacks him, demanding he learn English. He retorts "Eat my balls!", but his heavy accent results in sounding like "Eat my bowls!", which was reflected in the subtitles. He later sings part of "Yah Mo B There" by James Ingram and Michael McDonald in "Home Wrecker". Additionally he briefly spoke English in "Independent Movie" when he asked Steve, Snot and Barry to leave him alone in a cornfield during a soul searching session. Toshi also sings in English while part of the band B12 in season 8's "Can I Be Frank (With You)".
- Barry Robinson (voiced by Eddie Kaye Thomas; evil voice provided by Craig Ferguson) – Steve's morbidly obese friend, who has an inarticulate, strident, and sloppy vocal quality. Stan disdains Barry, often impulsively insulting his weight without even knowing why. Like Snot, Barry can speak Klingon and seems to be able to read Quenya. Barry apparently has a fetish for Miss Piggy. His borderline intellectual disability and innocent personality is the result of powerful anti-psychotic pills. In "With Friends Like Steve's", after stopping his medication regimen, Barry turns into a deranged and demonic mastermind, speaking in a low-pitched voice "like Gary Oldman", framing Steve for the destruction of Stan's beloved commemorative plates. Barry did this in an attempt to replace Steve within his immediate family. Barry's madness worsens over the episode, culminating with him trying to eliminate everyone that might get between himself and Stan. Steve ultimately tricks Barry into taking his medication, reverting him to his usual self. This personality facet arises when Snot and Toshi beat up a drugged Steve, with Barry screaming that they should kill Steve's whole family. Barry describes his parents as ignorant and implies that they engage in bondage sex play and smoke pot. Other statements imply that they are abusive or are negligent, making him sleep in their basement and often forgetting he is their son (and that they even have a son). He has a cameo appearance in the fat camp in the Family Guy episode "Killer Queen".

=== Other main characters ===
- Avery Bullock (voiced by Patrick Stewart from seasons 1 to 22) – A Deputy Director of the CIA and Stan's depraved, eccentric, and erratic 59-year-old boss. While somewhat less paranoid and usually more competent, he is as high strung as Stan and, more often than not, is even less moral in his actions and authority. He is also the user of many recreational drugs, and often engages in strange sexual fetishes. For instance, in the episode "Death By Dinner Party" he tells Roger that drugs help him think. He had a brief relationship with Hayley Smith, which almost cost Stan his job until Hayley left Avery for her old boyfriend. He was married, but his wife Miriam was once held hostage in Fallujah where she was hand-cuffed to a radiator as he "does not negotiate with terrorists". She was later rescued by Stan, but was eventually killed by Ricky Spanish, one of Roger's personas, while drunk on champagne. Bullock prefers the company of younger, "plump Asian" women (as he sings about girl fantasies). Many jokes are built around Avery giving respected Shakespearean actor Patrick Stewart the most unlikely scenes and lines, such as a Seussian rhyme about all the things that can be purchased at a strip club, an energetic two-hour banjo session, singing "Little Girls" by Oingo Boingo while dressed in a woman's robe, and jokes referring to Stewart's prominent role as Star Trek: The Next Generation captain Jean-Luc Picard. A recurring joke is that Bullock runs the CIA like kindergarten, with time-outs, show-and-tell, snack time, and field trips. In "Bullocks to Stan", during the fight scene at the end of the episode, there is a joke referring to Star Trek, however, this is hidden by Klaus' commentary (though the joke was revealed during the actual DVD commentary for the episode). Bullock appears in the Family Guy episode "Lois Kills Stewie" where he and Stan attempt to stop Stewie at gunpoint. The character is drawn identically to Stewart's appearance as himself on Family Guy.
- Principal Brian Lewis (voiced by Kevin Michael Richardson) – The principal of Pearl Bailey High School which Steve and his friends attend. Portrayed as an aggressive borderline psychotic with a checkered past, he displays a multitude of violent tendencies and a flippant attitude, and his dedication to the school is questionable. When Steve is the Student Body President, he commandeers Principal Lewis' office, as the student body president is entitled to secure any school grounds he needs. Lewis does not mind, since in doing this Steve proves that he can read and that the system works. He later allows Stan to teach a "morally upright" sexual education class, but only Steve is signed up for it. Lewis is a member of the "Illuminutty" – an organization revolving around a supposed conspiracy involving the invention of peanut butter. When presented with a tip that Steve is in possession of narcotics, he displays detailed knowledge of the source of the drugs and the method of "cutting" them, and concludes that a specific drug lord named Esteban Montilla is back in business; he tells Steve to tell Esteban that El Lobo Negrón (which translates to "The Black Wolf") sends his regards. Lewis keeps $500 hanging out of his pocket to make the students think he is rich. He has taken part in war reenactments, including a Vietnam War reenactment. In "100 A.D.", Principal Lewis is among the characters that pursue Hayley and Jeff for the bounty that Stan offers. In the episode "Naked To The Limit, One More Time" it is implied that Lewis is a drug dealer. In the scene, he shoots both men paying for the drugs, then takes the plane they flew in on and flies off. Steve just says, "False alarm, it's just my principal." In "You Debt Your Life", Lewis explicitly states that he used to run cocaine. This statement is accidentally made over the school PA system. Lewis' questionable past is often the source of comedy and subplots for the show, such as when Lewis is shown to own an aquarium shop in addition to being a principal. Lewis' family was apparently the inspiration for the sitcom Diff'rent Strokes, with Brian Lewis himself being the inspiration for Arnold, according to the episode "The Worst Stan". In the episode "Viced Principal", three escaped convicts attempt to blow up the school revealing that in the past, Lewis acted like a normal principal and attempted to bring out the best in all his students but was a perfectionist, leading these three to quit school and get arrested, blaming Lewis for their problems. Lewis realized that his students already had people to pressure students to work hard (i.e. their parents) and decided to act like a crazy friend to his students. The criminals were defeated but feeling sorry for them, he had a friend of his get them to Mexico and start new lives with some fake IDs.

== Secondary characters ==
=== Smith family relatives ===
==== Stan's relatives ====
- Jack Smith (voiced by Daran Norris) – The abusive, neglectful, deceitful, and opportunistic father of Stan and Rusty Smith, the father-in-law of Francine and Sooleawa'Uha Smith and the paternal grandfather of Steve, Hayley and Glenn Smith. For most of his life, Stan believed his father to be a secret agent but, in reality, he was a jewel thief. After the man Stan paid to pretend to be his father died, "Grandpa Smith" (the real Jack) dropped in on the family. Roger developed a "boy crush" on Jack but the other family members were wary of him. Roger goes so far as to dress like him and keeps Francine locked in a cage because Jack put her in there. Jack has black hair, sports an eyepatch on his left eye (based on the traditional look of Marvel Comics' super-spy Nick Fury), but otherwise resembles his son Stan. Roger compares him to Kurt Russell's character Snake Plissken from Escape from New York and Escape from L.A.. Jack's second appearance is a single line of him being heard but not seen in a flashback to Stan's childhood where he asks his father to read to him. Jack replies with a single line "Who the hell are you?" Jack makes his third appearance in a flashback showing him running out on Stan and his mother.

Jack makes his fourth appearance in which Steve decides to visit him in his jail. When it is discovered that Stan never learned to ride a bicycle because his father was not there for him at the moments of need, Steve decides to reconcile them both by making Stan visit the jail where Jack is passing his sentence. After the latter one is released on Stan's parole, Klaus suggests the three of them should go camping as an act of reuniting Stan with his own father. It turns out to be a bad idea as Stan soon finds out that Jack is using his grandson to appeal to Stan so that he could defend his own father in court during the next trial verdict. Jack then turns Steve to his side and both run away, all while Steve begins viewing Jack as a father figure. When things get out of hand, however, Jack confesses that he is a crook who was up to no good all this time and wishes Stan would not lose Steve in times of need as much he himself once did. When Stan finds out about this, he forces himself to ride his bike to the courthouse to give his own word of reference about his father's verdict, but arrives too late, much to both Jack's and Steve's contempt. Jack is sentenced to five more years of prison, but is not bothered by the idea now that he has formed a genuine relationship with his grandson, and Stan promises to visit him this time.

In "Blood Crieth Unto Heaven" (which was depicted in the style of a stage play), it turned out that Jack had left the family after Stan found his mother making out with Jack (who was disguised as a clown at the time) and that he was eventually arrested after the police commissioner that Stan idolized and invited to his birthday called for police backup while investigating the thefts of the fruits from a fruit truck. In "Minstrel Krampus" (which was depicted in the style of a Christmas story), Jack is revealed to have trapped Krampus while as a child. When Stan frees Krampus to teach Steve a lesson and it does not go well, Stan had to use his CIA connections to get Jack out of prison. After being shot by Santa Claus while protecting Stan Smith, the blood of Jack and Krampus combine which revives Jack as Krampus. In this form, Jack plans to continue his predecessor's job in tormenting naughty children. In the episode "Ninety North, Zero West", Jack Smith is still in his Krampus form as Stan persuades him to help save Steve from Santa Claus at the time when he plans to awaken the Sumerian giant Humbaba. In the episode "Klaustastrophe.tv", Jack reappears, now a human again. No explanation for this is given. In the episode "Ghost Dad", he gets killed in a police car chase and ends up as a ghost haunting a sports museum.

- Betty Smith (voiced by Swoosie Kurtz) – Jack's ex-wife, Stan's mother, Francine's mother-in-law and the paternal grandmother of Steve and Hayley. After Jack abandoned them, Stan took care of her and Betty began to depend unnaturally on her son. This relationship evolved to the point where Stan abducted all of Betty's new boyfriends from fear that they would end up hurting her, dumping them on an uncharted island. Betty later marries Hercules, a widowed Greek butcher, who she met through Francine. Betty tells Stan that neither she nor her son need to depend on one another as they once did, finally ending his obsessive protectiveness of her. Stan accepts that Betty has moved on and tolerates their marriage, though only after he has tried to stop them on board their flight to Greece. Betty is still unaware of her son's earlier actions, and all her previous suitors remain on a deserted island, which the two couples sail near after Betty and Hercules get married in Greece. A short time later, Hercules dies as well, once again leaving Betty as a widow. She moves back into Stan's house, living in the attic with a put-upon Roger, who goes by the alias of Tom Yabbo. She later falls in love with Roger and marries him. They take a trip to Niagara Falls where Betty plans to kill her new spouse, to collect the insurance money on a policy that she has taken out on him. Despite Stan's attempt to save his life, "Tom" falls to his death in the Falls, but Stan then notices Roger in a rain slicker leading a tour group, indicating he is fine. Betty manages to collect the insurance money and moves to Paris, France, where she is seen going into a theater to watch "Fast and the Furious 7" enjoying the gay sex scenes depicted.
- Rusty Smith (voiced by Lou Diamond Phillips) – Stan's Native American half-brother who lives in Arizona with his wife Sooleawa'Uha and son Glen. He is the son of Jack Smith and a Cherokee woman he met in Santa Fe. Rusty and his family visit Stan's family every Thanksgiving. When their paternal grandfather was dying, he left Rusty and Stan $20,000 and some land he thought was worthless. Stan took the cash (which he loses on a bus) while Rusty takes the land, which turned out to have enormous copper deposits. During their annual reunions Stan treats his relatives in a patronizing way believing that they are poor. On a return visit to Arizona it becomes clear that earnings from copper mining have made Rusty the extremely wealthy owner of a desert estate, living in a huge mansion modeled on that of a Roman emperor. Humiliated and jealous Stan unsuccessfully attempts to steal the property only to be expelled by Rusty's security detail. Previously polished and courteous, the now-furious Rusty vows to kill his half-brother if he returns. After Hayley and Jeff rescue Stan, Francine, Steve, and Roger from the desert, Rusty appears with a gun stating that they are still on his property. When Stan asks how much land he has, Rusty states "sooooo much" in a dated and stereotyped Native American response. Rusty is distracted when the half-bodied helicopter pilot returns, giving the Smiths and Jeff the opportunity to escape.
- Sooleawa'Uha Smith (voiced by Tonantzin Carmelo) – The Native American wife of Rusty, and the paternal half-aunt of Steve and Hayley. She is also the half sister-in-law to Stan and Francine Smith. Sooleawa'Uha patiently tolerates condescending remarks by Francine, although she lives in far greater affluence, with servants and a much larger kitchen.
- Glen Smith (voiced by Danny Cistone) – The seldom speaking son of Rusty and Sooleawa'Uha and the paternal half-cousin of Steve and Hayley,and the half nephew of Stan and Francine Smith.

==== Francine's relatives ====
- Bàba and Māma Ling (voiced by Tzi Ma and Amy Hill respectively) – Francine's Chinese-American adoptive parents and the maternal grandparents of Steve and Hayley. Stan once found their ways of life and Mandarin linguistics to be unbearably obnoxious. This was especially because they practically took over his house and redecorated it in all of their original visits. However, after Baba saved Stan's life when his house was set on fire, he warmed up to the Lings and ultimately came to respect them. Bàba, in turn, apologized to Stan for not showing him more respect. In these moments, Baba also admitted he and Mama had been focusing most of their attention on their other daughter Gwen over Francine. They admitted to their belief that Stan was a decent son-in-law who has taken good care of her since they have been married. For this reason, both Baba and Mama know that it be unwise to give their money to Francine as opposed to Gwen when they pass away. Much of their behavior is a parody of Oriental stereotypes and are a mix of Chinese culture and Japanese. For example, bowing is a more pronounced characteristic of Japanese culture than Chinese (at least in the modern day), and their redecoration of the Smith house is in a Japanese (washitsu) style, complete with a kotatsu table. (Note: "Bàba" and "Māma" are the Mandarin equivalents of "Dad" and "Mom", their full names have not been revealed. Ling (凌) is a common Chinese surname.)
- Gwen Ling (voiced by Uma Thurman in "Now and Gwen" and Ming-Na Wen in "Aw Rats, A Pool Party") – Gwen is Francine's older sister, the biological child of the Lings. After Stan meets Francine's biological parents, he tries to manipulate Francine into wanting to meet them and disowning Baba and Mama. He accomplishes this by showing Francine their will in which everything is left to Gwen. At the episode's end, Baba reveals to Stan that it is Chinese customs to give the money to the child that needs the help and explains why they chose Gwen over Francine. He and Mama both know that she is an idiot and promiscuous. Gwen failed school when she was younger and therefore they know she will need a lot of help when they die. However unlike Gwen, Francine is smart, has a good husband, and she does not need their money. During an "expositional" joke, Gwen is implied to be three years younger than Francine, although she is actually three years older than Francine. It is implied that Baba and Mama both resent her for not being more like Francine. Stan apparently lusts after Gwen, who is repeatedly described as being "Playboy hot", which irritates Francine to no end as she and her parents know about her promiscuity. He has mused over a marriage between Gwen and either Greg or Terry. Francine talks Stan out of this, citing the fact that Greg and Terry are obviously homosexual and are not interested in getting involved with her sister. Stan does not immediately accept this, preferring to believe that Gwen is "too hot" for either man, but he eventually comes to terms with and accepts their homosexuality. Gwen makes her first on-screen appearance in "Now and Gwen" when she visits the family as a cover for her probation officer and continue her scams. Hayley gets annoyed with Francine always covering her and finally confronts Gwen, receiving a vague warning. When she tells Francine, she discovers that Gwen took the blame for a school fire started when Francine tried to emulate her sister's smoking in school and had tried to make up for it ever since. As a result of Hayley's confrontation, she planned on setting the school on fire and frame Francine for it. With Gwen admitting that she took the blame the first time due to her love for her sister, they work out their differences. Gwen offers Francine a cigarette to celebrate patching things up, but the two accidentally set the school on fire. Francine agrees to take the blame and be arrested. Gwen however gets arrested for violating her parole while Francine's charges are dismissed under a suspended sentence due to Stan's connections to the CIA. As a result, Gwen promises revenge against her sister once she gets out of prison.
- Nicholas and Cassandra Dawson (voiced by Jeffery "Jeff" Perry and Holland Taylor respectively) – Francine's biological parents who are also the parents of Janet. They abandoned Francine as an infant just to fly first class on a vacation four decades ago, since they could not do so with her. They are wealthy and appear good-natured, but deep down they are extremely self-centered. Stan once befriended them and tried to introduce them to Francine (who has no memory of them), by inviting them in the house. When the Dawsons admitted that they gave her up just to keep their first class ticket, this made Stan nervous around them, but is determined to keep them around. However, Klaus sees both Nicholas and Cassandra for the monsters they truly are and warns Stan to get them out of the house because he is setting Francine up to be hurt by them. He tried to ignore Klaus, but eventually realizes that the German Goldfish was right about the Dawsons. Stan stopped trying after being put off by their selfish nature, especially when they leave him trapped in his burning house instead of helping him out, feeling that Francine is better off not knowing about them. They leave without meeting her. In the episode "Family Plan", Francine officially meets Nicholas when she decides to be part of a bigger family. By this time, Cassandra had committed suicide by hanging and Nicholas has pitted the family against each other in order to see who gains control over the family fortune. After Francine is left the victor, he tries to finish off her as well, only for Stan to save her. Nicholas is left alone with only his cat (Roger in disguise).
- Janet Dawson (voiced by Jillian Bell) - Francine's biological cousin through Nicholas and Cassandra. Apart from Nicholas, she is the only member of Francine's biological family that is still alive.

==== Roger's relatives ====
- Fred (voiced by Michael Imperioli) – Roger's deadbeat father. Although Roger mentions having eaten him in "I Am the Walrus", he is shown to be alive and living on Earth in "Piece by Piece". Like his son, Fred is a master of disguise and uses various personas. He abandoned Roger in his youth to pursue a solitary life of self-interest and refuses to reconnect with him when found.
- Rizbo (voiced by SungWon Cho) – Roger's uncle who owns a space gas station.

==== Other ====
- Henry Fischer (voiced by Clancy Brown) – Father of Jeff, who grows and deals marijuana in Raleigh, North Carolina. He has used Jeff to ship drugs, which has gotten Jeff framed for drug-trafficking. When Stan and Roger learn that Jeff is wanted on drug charges in Florida, they pursue him to his father's farm hoping to cash in on the reward and get Jeff out of Stan's life. They are tricked and tied up by Henry who declares that he intends to turn in Jeff himself for the reward money. He also reveals a startling fact that he had grown the marijuana Jeff was found with on his farm and sent Jeff to bring it to Florida, though Jeff had been totally unaware of any of this. Stan and Roger escape but Mr. Fischer has already turned Jeff in at the Boca Raton Police Department, and openly admits that he cares more about the money than his son. Stan, however, proves Mr. Fischer's guilt, because he had been wearing a wire during his confession as he always wears a wire for his job. Mr. Fischer is taken away for the drug charge and for attempting to murder Roger and Stan. Henry later popped up as an audience member in "Phantom of the Telethon".

=== Corbin-Bates family ===
- Greg Corbin (voiced by Seth MacFarlane) – The local news anchor on W-ANG-TV, he is Terry's brown-haired co-anchor and domestic partner. He along with Terry are neighbors to the Smiths. He and Terry have a penchant for minor bickering, flirting, and working on stereotypical "couples' issues" on the set or in other scenes of the show. Greg is a member of the Log Cabin Republicans. He is presented as being very culturally sophisticated, at one point causing Stan to choose him over Francine as his guest to get into Avery Bullock's high-end party. He and Terry have a surrogate baby daughter, Liberty Belle. Before Libby's birth, Greg is panicky, questioning his ability and readiness to be a father, but immediately loves Libby upon holding her for the first time. He is the "power top" in his and Terry's relationship and was once involved in a heterosexual marriage, during a period of time in which he was "confused" and believed he was heterosexual.
- Terry Bates (voiced by Mike Barker) – Terry Bates is a Langley Falls local news anchor, Greg's co-anchor and domestic partner, and the Smiths' neighbor. Terry is a Democrat with blonde hair. He once goes out for a night with Stan as Stan erroneously attempts to "become gay" by choice, though they stop short of having sex when Stan realizes that he cannot choose to be gay. He has a surrogate daughter with Greg—Liberty Belle—and owns a French Bulldog named "Heath Ledger". He is the bottom in their relationship. Another strain on his relationship with Greg was when Greg was revealed to be a Log Cabin Republican, to which Terry threw a tantrum in front of the whole neighborhood in disbelief at how Greg could have voted for George W. Bush (whom Terry calls "He-Who-Must-Not-Be-Named"). Terry eventually leaves Greg to follow the band 311 around. Terry's removal from the series was due to Mike Barker leaving the show due to creative differences.
- Liberty Belle "Libby" Corbin-Bates – Terry and Greg's daughter, conceived with an egg donor and Francine as a surrogate mother. Shortly after her birth, Stan kidnapped her because he believed that gay couples should not be allowed to raise children; they nearly reached Nebraska but Stan was finally convinced to return her to Greg and Terry. Stan had named her after the Liberty Bell, and for reasons unexplained, her fathers kept the name, but barred him from seeing Libby again for his actions. It is said in a later episode that Francine was named Libby's godmother, likely due to Greg and Terry's gratitude over her carrying Libby via surrogacy.
- "Tank" Bates (voiced by Kevin Michael Richardson) – Tank is Terry's father and a retired Washington Redskins player. In early episodes, Terry is implied to be closeted from his father, stating, "I've told you, as soon as my father dies I will wear the ring", upsetting Greg, who believes Terry should stop hiding their relationship. When "Tank" comes to visit, Terry pretends that Francine is his girlfriend and that Libby is their illegitimate daughter, and claims that Stan and Greg are gay lovers. During the time he spent in the episode, Tank is shown to be quite intolerant of homosexuality, constantly mocking Stan and calling him "fairy". When Stan drunkenly outs Terry, Tank disowns his son. After unsuccessful attempts by Stan to decipher the basis of Tank's homophobia, Terry eventually gives his father the option of accepting him and being a part of their family or leaving, with Tank choosing to disown him. Tank later participates in a Vietnam War reenactment in the episode "In Country...Club", but has no dialogue. In "Gorillas in the Mist", Tank was shown watching the news in a bar, where Terry mentions that he forgives his dad. Tank changes the channel and tells the bartender that the guy dancing on television is his son. In "The Two Hundred", Tank Bates appears as one of the savage survivors.

=== CIA personnel ===
- Jackson (voiced by Mike Henry) – One of Stan's co-workers at the CIA. He was once a real estate agent, and is a "former homosexual". Apparently, when he stopped selling houses, his "sodomy cleared right up". His conversion has been suggested to be unsuccessful, suggesting that he may be transgender as well. Moreover, when asked if he ever "did it with a dead mermaid", he replied "Mermaid, no." He had a body double who was accidentally killed by Stan. He is almost always seen with something in his hands, such as a coffee cup.
- Dick Reynolds (voiced by Stephen Root from 2005 to 2007, David Koechner from 2008 to present) – Another of Stan's CIA co-workers. His wife eventually got a job in which she earned more money than he did, eventually surpassing him so much in earning power that his genitals disappeared, a joke referencing his sense of emasculation. He has a son who has a freakishly large hand with which he beats his father. He is now divorced from his wife Sheila and has a dog named Biscuit, which he seized from Sheila (who also had an affair with Dick's barber, Al) when he was angry that the courts awarded ownership of the dog to her during their divorce. In "One Little Word", Stan and Bullock unknowingly encounter Dick dressed as an automobile at a furry convention and seen "running over" (erotic roleplay) a furry. He is later seen still (in costume) running over an unconscious Roger, but stops when he gets a call on his cellphone (which reveals his identity to the viewer).
- Reginald the Koala (voiced by Donald Fullilove in 2009, Erik Durbin from 2010 to present) – Like Klaus, Reginald is an animal with the brain of a human. Differently however, he is a koala with very urban mannerisms and behaviors. His first appearance was in "Family Affair" where he was revealed to have been a homeless man at one point who, in exchange for a free hot meal, chose to partake in a CIA experiment that had his brain put into the body of a koala. The lyrics of an '80s theme song played in the episode imply that he uses his new adorable body to go on missions, able to distract the enemy with his cute koala body such that no one would question him. In the episode "Wife Insurance", it is shown that he goes on dangerous missions like Stan and the others. He is regularly seen relaxing in Stan's pool. Reginald has dated Hayley. Reginald is also skilled in the Afro-Brazilian martial art known as Capoeira and has used it to fight Bullock over Hayley.
- John Sanders (voiced by Mike Barker) – Another of Stan's CIA co-workers. He often takes part in meetings with Bullock and Stan. He goes out with Jackson and Dick and once killed a panda.
- Ray (voiced by Victor Raider-Wexler) – A CIA agent and one of Stan's poker buddies alongside Bad Larry. Ray always recalls what he ate after he killed someone. In "Office Spaceman", Ray is among the CIA Agents on the CIA's Alien Task Force. In 100 A.D., Ray (alongside Duper) died in a bus crash with the other background characters that wanted the bounty that Stan offered for the capture of Hayley and Jeff. He has since turned up alive. In "Old Stan in the Mountain", Stan mocks his age to persuade Bullock that he should replace him in the demonstration of a high-tech killing machine. But Stan is cursed by another old man that he had mocked and is rapidly aged to even older than Ray. The demonstration is a disaster, much to Ray's delight as Avery asks if this was a way to mock him.
- Bad Larry (voiced by Don Lake) – A CIA agent and one of Stan's poker buddies alongside Ray. In "The 42-Year-Old Virgin", he recalls his first kill where he shot his ex-partner who was a double-agent. He helps Ray and Roger get Stan his first kill—a pedophile named Randy—whom they trail to the "Wet, Young, & Wild" water park, where he plans to molest and kill Steve, Snot, Barry, and Toshi. When Randy brags that he will get off (or at least get a light sentence) due to his mother's money and a good lawyer, Stan fires his gun and accidentally shoots Bad Larry, who dies from the shot and subsequently becomes Stan's actual first kill. In spite of the depiction of his death, he re-appears in later episodes ("Widowmaker", "Stanny-Boy and Frantastic") as a background character without dialogue.
- Duper (voiced by Phill Lewis in most appearances, Dee Bradley Baker in "The Kidney Stays in the Picture") – Agent Duper was a CIA Agent and rival of Stan Smith who first appeared in "Roger Codger". He beats Stan's time on a "Regime Change" testing simulation following with a better snappy line than Stan's. When Stan placed a bomb in Bullock's office to make himself look good by saving the day, Duper disabled it when Stan could not see the manual (after dropping and breaking his reading glasses). In a later episode, his essay on President Bush beat Stan's, but he was disqualified after learning most of his essay was plagiarized from Willy Wonka. In 100 A.D., Duper and Ray died in a bus crash with the other background characters that wanted the bounty that Stan offered for the capture of Hayley and Jeff. In "Son of Stan", Duper appears to be mourning himself, but it is actually a clone the CIA made. The clone is exactly the same as Duper (except Duper was married to, in the clone's words, "some ugly chick"). This inspired Stan to clone Steve for a parenting experiment. Later in the series, Duper suffers from the effect of a time-travel experiment gone wrong. Since he failed to return to the present before midnight, he returned as a blob of what used to be flesh. In "Honey, I'm Homeland", Duper took part in Avery Bullock's activity to test Mount Rushmore's defenses by posing as Christoff of the Occupy cell. In "She Swill Survive", Duper is on Bullock's list of people who like crocs.
- Bill (voiced by Seth MacFarlane) – Bill is Stan's CIA double. The only noticeable difference between the two is Bill's southern accent; and he can easily impersonate Stan's voice. He often takes Stan's place when there are things he does not want to go to, such as Steve's baptism or cooking classes with Francine. When Stan was faced with the dilemma of whether to go to the high school reunion prom with Betty Sue, the Homecoming Queen and saving his marriage with Francine in "It's Good to Be Queen", Stan called in Bill to take Francine out to dinner while he went to the prom. But soon Francine decided to go to the prom, making things a bit complicated, since Stan decided to give up his dream rather than lose his wife. When the two of them were standing in the same gym, Francine took Stan's gun, preparing to shoot his leg. She ends up shooting the one who did not apologize, who was actually Bill. Bill was taken aboard a helicopter, hearing that his leg cannot be saved. In "Pulling Double Booty", Hayley meets Bill after going to the CIA to have an Argument with Stan. Mistaking Bill for Stan she apologizes which leads to them getting into a relationship. When Bill is shown by Stan how "hot" Francine is, Bill tries to have sex with Francine by impersonating Stan. Stan throws Bill out of the window, by what appears to be his genitals, and tells Bill that he cannot see Hayley again. In order to stop Hayley going on a rampage when Bill dumps her, Stan pretends to be Bill to take Hayley out on a date.
- Lorraine (voiced by Niecy Nash) – Lorraine is the obese secretary of CIA Headquarters. She first appears in "Chimdale" in which Steve shows her the bald eagle balloon that he brought for his dad whom he believes is working without his wig but finds out he is still wearing it. Lorraine has a crowd scene cameo after Jeff claims the money in "100 A.D.". In "G-String Circus", Deputy Director Bullock directs her to send a mass e-mail to all agents to join him at XanaBoobs to spend the CIA surplus funds. Lorraine becomes Deputy Director Bullock's personal assistant in "Flirting With Disaster". When Francine is hired to replace her as secretary, all of the CIA employees start paying attention to Francine and ignore Lorraine. During lunch with Stan who is also depressed that he feels he cannot flirt with the office ladies while Francine is around, they both agree that Francine has to go. While Stan merely wants to get Francine fired, Lorraine throws acid in Francine's face, melting it and is arrested. Despite her previous legal problems, she is seen as a secretary again in "Wheels & the Legman and the Case of Grandpa's Key" when she enlists the help of the duo to locate her missing bird Flygirl which is already dead and Steve struggles to hide the body until he learns to confront people with bad news and tells her the truth. Lorraine appears in "The Missing Kink" during the "He's Got a Kink" song in which she is seen sitting on a man wearing a green S&M suit while another man in an orange S&M suit stands by wearing a lamp shade over his head.

=== Pearl Bailey High School ===
- Akiko Yoshida (voiced by Grey DeLisle in 2009, Grace Park from 2010 to present) – Akiko is Toshi's younger sister. She first appears in "American Dream Factory" as a child with no dialogue when Toshi brings her to audition as a drummer for Steve's Band "The Asstones" but on her next appearance in "Weiner of Our Discontent", she is a pre-teen or young teenager. She refereed the hot dog eating contest between Toshi and Steve in the same episode. She speaks perfect English and occasionally translates for Toshi. Akiko dressed as Chun-Li from the video game series Street Fighter for Halloween in "Best Little Horror House in Langley Falls". When Steve develops a crush on Akiko, they are forced to flee from Toshi until Steve convinces him that he is being too possessive of her. Thinking he can open up to Akiko, Steve is stunned when she announces she has a crush on a nine-year-old named Doug because he is a great dancer; however, in a later episode "Spelling Bee My Baby", Akiko developed feelings for Steve and vice versa.
- Debbie Hyman (voiced by Lizzy Caplan) – An overweight goth girl and Steve's main crush. When she and Steve begin dating, it causes Stan to become anorexic because he is disgusted by her obesity. Steve breaks up with her after he realizes she is causing it, but they reunite when he realizes it did not help. Stan accepts her after she demonstrates prowess with firearms, but is disliked by Francine. Debbie appears in "Iced, Iced Babies", though she reportedly breaks up with Steve by the end. She and Steve get back together in "Escape from Pearl Bailey", where Steve gets Debbie to run for Student Council President against Lisa Silver. Debbie loses when an insulting page of her on the Internet is shown around school. Steve, thinking that Lisa and her friends did it, gets revenge on them. When he tells Debbie she breaks up with him, as she does not believe in vengeance, it turns out that Steve's friends made the slam page because they view her as monopolizing his time and everyone in the school goes after them. They are caught by Debbie's clique, who tells them to let Steve go and makes up with him. She tries to get Steve to come with her, but he says he wants to stay by his friends. Debbie lets them all go while she and the other goths distract the student body. In "Bar Mitzvah Shuffle", Debbie falls for Snot's Bar Mitzvah study buddy Etan because she says he is more mature than Steve. Steve sabotages Etan's Bar Mitzvah, hoping to prove that Etan is less mature than she thinks he is. However, Snot is blamed for the sabotage. When Steve admits to sabotaging the party before the Jewish Court, Debbie is also displeased with this, and permanently ends her relationship with Steve.
- Lisa Silver (voiced by Carmen Electra in the pilot, Elizabeth Banks in later appearances) – Head cheerleader and most popular girl in school. Her best friends are Janet Lewis and Amy. She first appears in the pilot episode, where Steve tries to ask her out but she rejects him. When Steve becomes Student Council President they date, but she dumps him when he tries to kiss her, and Stan has her family deported. She reappears in "1,600 Candles" when Steve successfully asks her out to the prom after his confidence is boosted by the appearance of his first pubic hair. In "Escape from Pearl Bailey", Lisa wins re-election as Student Council President, defeating Debbie, and Steve infects her with oral herpes, believing her responsible for a slam page that cost Debbie the election only to learn with humiliation that his friends were behind it with the belief that Steve deserves someone else more worthy of his time.
- Vince Chung (voiced by John Cho) – A very popular Asian student part of the school swim team and one of the school's many known bullies. Vince is introduced in "Helping Handis" in which he temporarily befriends Steve, but only due to being attracted to Steve's huge breasts from steroids. In later seasons, Vince Chung remained a frequent character, making a wide variety major and minor appearances both with and without lines, primarily in cases to bully Steve and his friends.
- Lindsay Coolidge (voiced by Terri Lyn Rodriguez) – A cheerleader and one of several girls that Steve tries to impress. In her first appearance she remarks that Steve is more fun to be around than she expected. However, she discovers Roger's secret identity as an alien and has to have her memories wiped by Stan. Later, Lindsay states that she likes guys who engage in risky behavior, resulting in Steve accidentally blowing his thumb off with a firecracker. After the accident she lets Steve touch her breast, but when he admits that he cannot feel anything (due to the anesthesia in his hand) she storms off. Steve learns to play the cello in an effort to impress Lindsay, who he describes as "a cello slut". Steve is successful, but brushes Lindsay off after a recital to attend to an injured cat. Lindsay makes several cameo appearances in later episodes.
- Superintendent Ellen Riggs (voiced by Anjelica Huston) – The superintendent of Pearl Bailey High School. In the episode "A Ward Show", Roger convinces Riggs to fire Principal Brian Lewis when he reveals that Lewis is using Steve for his accounting and other things. In "The Worst Stan", Stan hooks up Riggs with Lewis in marriage so that he can be Brian's best man. Riggs only wants to marry Brian because she believes that marrying him will dispel rumors about her and allow her to achieve her ultimate goal of city comptroller. She achieves this when she ends up marrying Tracey Bryant, Lewis's former prison cellmate, after she knocks out Stan. She is shown taking Tracey home, becoming pregnant with his child, and winning the campaign to become comptroller.

=== Around the neighborhood ===
- Linda Memari (voiced by Megyn Price) – A woman of Iranian descent, the wife of Bob Memari, and best friend to Francine. Linda saved Francine from the Lady Bugs, a social group for women who cheat on their husbands, by kissing her. It has been suggested that Linda may not be attracted to her husband and is in reality a closeted lesbian. In an attempt to hit on Francine, she rearranged her clothes to make her bust more prominent and knocked on the Smiths' door (prompting a drunk Stan to comment "When did you get those?"). After thinking that Stan was beating Francine, she makes an awkward excuse to leave. Francine then says, "She's a weird chick." Linda's husband is apparently resigned to her preferences, and asks, in a defeated tone, if he can "at least watch this time", when he sees Linda eying Francine. In "Cheek to Cheek: A Stripper's Story", Roger states that Linda has died.
- Bob Memari (voiced by Ron Livingston) – Born in Cleveland, Ohio, Bob is the Iranian husband to Linda Memari and neighbor of Stan. Stan initially discriminates against Bob and suspects he and his wife are terrorists because of their ethnic background, as seen in the episode "Homeland Insecurity". Ironically, Bob is not upset at Stan's accusations, because he himself says his previous neighbors were far worse; "They were black." implying he himself is racist.
- Chuck White (voiced by Mike Barker) – Stan's gloating arch-enemy who often outdoes Stan. Chuck is abusive towards his daughter, Betsy, forcing her to do gymnastics and keeping her away from boys because he believes they will get her pregnant. He ends each sentence with a mocking laugh, e.g. "Looks like you're parking in the sun again, ha-ha!"; however, he does not seem to have any control over it, and always seems to laugh even when angry or depressed. Ever since his first appearance, however, Chuck's life has been slowly falling apart: Betsy was accidentally impregnated with Roger's child and as a result lost her shot at the Olympics, and his wife was shamed in the local paper for smoking cannabis and is known to be openly promiscuous.
- Buckle (voiced by Matt McKenna) – Buckle first appears in "An Apocalypse to Remember" as a mountain man the Smiths meet when Stan thought that a nuclear-war drill was the real thing. Buckle secretly follows them home to try to abduct and marry Hayley. The Smiths concoct a plan to distract him from Hayley and bail Roger out of a fake-wedding-to-get-a-new-blender jam by setting Buckle up with Roger's intended bride, Sharri Rothberg, who proceeds to annoy him with constant nagging. In "An Incident at Owl Creek", the Rothberg-Buckles move into the Smiths' neighborhood. In "Best Little Horror House in Langley Falls", it was revealed that Buckle used to work as a Walt Disney Imagineer until his designs were deemed too scary. Buckle's name is conjecture; when introduced in "An Apocalypse to Remember" he states that he can not remember his name and settled on "Buckle" because "Buckle feels right." He is based on James "Grizzly" Adams.
- Sharri Rothberg (voiced by Lisa Edelstein) – Sharri Rothberg is a woman that Roger dupes into marrying him. After Stan accidentally destroyed Roger's blender during his nuclear war panic (when he mistook the drill for that for the real thing), he meets her on J-Date, after Klaus told him about it. Sharri's "Jewish-American princess" side comes out while registering for their gifts at Crate and Roundish Cylinder, becoming pushy and demanding. On their wedding day, Roger dumps Sharri after he receives the blender he wanted. She marries Buckle (the mountain man that followed the Smiths home from the woods intent on marrying Hayley) and proceeds to annoy him with frequent nagging. In "An Incident at Owl Creek", she and Buckle move into the neighborhood.
- Sergei Kruglov (Russian: Серге́й Круглов) (voiced by Steve Hely) – A former KGB agent known as the "Wolf of Leningrad". In 1988, Stan and Sergei were captured by their respective opponent sides, but during the prisoner exchange Stan was recaptured by the Soviets. After the Berlin Wall falls and the Soviet Union collapses, Sergei's wife leaves him for a West German tennis equipment salesman and his son becomes an entrepreneur who sells Halloween costumes for dogs. Vowing to steal Stan's son for communism, he eventually moves to Langley Falls and into the home formerly owned by Mr. Hallworthy after it is discovered that Mr. Hallworthy has died. Sergei then helps Steve construct a model rocket while teaching him the ways of communism. Stan then wins Steve back, and Sergei helps Barry construct a rocket which wins the school's contest. Toward the end of the episode he acts like a normal neighbor to Stan coming over both to threaten him and then give Stan mail belonging to him that was in his mailbox. Sergei is on the Homeowners' Association Board.
- Father Donovan (voiced by Martin Mull) – The pastor of the Episcopalian Church that the Smiths attend. He is extremely bored with and resentful of his job and faith, preferring to go fishing on Sunday. Donovan gets all information for eulogies from driver's licenses and is not above having sex with married women of his congregation (though he is especially attracted to Francine). Donovan implies that he is an atheist – when Stan asks him what to do about his best friend who does not believe in God, Donovan replies, "Well Stan, we're hardly best friends." In "Rapture's Delight", when everyone is ascending into Heaven, Father Donovan is left behind with Roger, Stan, and Francine, at which point he remarks, "Turns out there is a God". He has a heart surgery scar on his chest. In "Season's Beatings", Father Donovan casts Stan and Roger in a televised Christmas play at the mall, but when they break out brawling during a performance, he bans Stan from the church on his superiors' behalf with the only way of re-admittance being either donating a lot of money to the church, finding the Holy Grail, or killing the Anti-Christ. When Stan realizes that the baby Hayley and Jeff took in and named Nemo is the Anti-Christ, Stan was able to present evidence of this to Father Donovan causing them, with Roger and Jeff, to pursue and kill Nemo. Father Donovan is badly injured when Nemo uses his powers to burn down the orphanage, severing the priest's legs.
- Al Tuttle (voiced by Richard Kind) – Generally referred to as simply "Tuttle", this character is one of the Smiths' neighbors, such a chatty fellow that Stan originally circled the block six or seven times to avoid talking to him in "Homeland Insecurity" (when his name was given as Bob Tuttle). When Stan finally runs out of gas and has to stop and talk, he and Francine learn that Tuttle's wife Betty died several months earlier. By "Don't Look a Smith Horse in the Mouth", he is named Al and has become severely obese from mourning and loneliness, but when Steve and his friends help him out of his house for the first time since the first season, he returns to his friendly and optimistic self, though still fat. In the same episode, a photo of his wife's grave is shown, depicting her name as Lisa, not Betty. As of the episode "Roots", Tuttle is shown to be back to his regular weight. At the same time, he also now plays a more prominent role in later seasons as an overly eager socialite and a supposed neighborhood friend of the Smith family who in general finds himself a frequent victim and doormat for the family's toxic, chaotic, and obnoxious ways, particularly Stan, in his own misguided desperation to feel part of a family.
- James A. Garfield (voiced by Chris Parnell) - A cloned duplicate of the 20th President of the United States created by Stan to teach Hayley the importance of history. He is later named Mayor of Langley Falls after Stan was briefly elected and overthrown by Roger's coup to take over the town that left the previous mayor dead.

== Recurring characters ==
- Barb Hanson (voiced by Rachael MacFarlane) – Barb is the Langley Falls realtor at Expositions Realty. Her right hand was cut off after Stan sent her to Guantanamo Bay Naval Base in "Threat Levels" and she wears a prosthetic hook. She seems to have a strong dislike for Francine and is often seen hanging out with Christie White. The episode "Roger 'n' Me" reveals that she and Captain Monty are best friends.
- Captain Monty (voiced by Matt McKenna) – A man with only one eye, only one hand and only one leg, wearing stereotypical pirate gear, such as an eye patch, a prosthetic hook, and a peg leg. He speaks very slowly and in an excessively elaborate and hyperbolic manner. He is shown working as a waiter for a fondue restaurant, the host of the most prestigious children's books author interview program in Langley Falls and is best friends with Barbara Hanson. He is a parody of James Lipton.
- Danuta Tenuta (voiced by Anne Gregory and Nicole Shabtai) - Hayley's attractive friend, who Klaus has a long held, unrequited crush on. She is shown to attend the same community college as Hayley. She is also the roommate of Nerfer.
- Esther Lonstein (voiced by Nicole Shabtai) - Snot's mother. She is a sexually promiscuous, alcoholic, Jewish woman. She is mentioned to be a nurse. She was left by Snot's father, Lonnie Lonstein, so he could drive demolition derbies, something that makes her reluctant to let Snot drive.
- Hideki Yoshida (voiced by Reggie Lee) – Toshi and Akiko's father. According to Stan, he is a venture capitalist, and by his own admission claims to always follow his gut. He is apparently a ruthless businessman, as he had little trouble drawing a firearm against Stan and Roger during the celebration for their cake cutter, and later rips off Stan's and Roger's idea for male stripper shoes.
- Hiko Yoshida (voiced by Sandra Oh) – Toshi's and Akiko's mother. She asks Steve to take Akiko trick-or-treating in "Best Little Horror House in Langley Falls", following an argument with Toshi over his refusal to wear the Samurai costume she bought him. Though she speaks perfect English, and in the episode "Spelling Bee My Baby" even admits to not knowing how to speak Japanese, Francine claims not to understand her in "Weiner of Our Discontent" due to a disagreement between the pair, Francine mockingly asking if anyone spoke "sushi hostess". In "Spelling Bee My Baby" she's presented as a tiger parent who forces her will on her children. This brings out Francine's ultra-wicked side, and the two engage in a bitter rivalry at the expense of Steve and Akiko.
- Nerfer (voiced by Rachel Dratch) - Hayley's friend and roommate of Danuta. She was often mentioned by Hayley, before finally appearing to attend a dinner party hosted by Francine.
- Santa Claus (voiced by Matt McKenna) – A figure of the holiday season. In this show, Santa Claus is portrayed as a villainous commercialist promoter with a habit for bearing deep-seated grudges. His vendetta against the Smith family began in "For Whom the Sleigh Bell Tolls" when Stan gives Steve an Ak-47 assault rifle that he used to accidentally shoot Santa while he was posing as a Mall Santa. Buried and left for dead by the family, Santa was retrieved by his Christmas Elves and recovered with the intent to kill the Smiths every Christmas. In "Minstrel Krampus" (which was depicted in the style of a Christmas story), Santa fakes a ceasefire with the Smiths to kill his former partner Krampus to preserve his investment in big toy companies. In "Ninety North, Zero West", Santa Claus kidnaps Steve Smith as part of a plot to awaken the Sumerian giant Humbaba and claim his powers. This did not go well as Humbaba sucked Santa Claus and most of the North Pole into him. Though Santa survived while emerging from Humbaba long after the monster was decapitated by Steve Smith, he ends up being killed and later resurrected in "Santa, Schmanta" to reclaim his powers from Roger.
- Sinbad (voiced by himself) – Sinbad is a known actor and comedian. He appeared in "Lost in Space" as a slave in a giant space mall for Roger's people. After Jeff Fischer is captured, he shows him around the slave camp and takes him to EmBARcaderos, where Jeff finds out the only way to escape his fate is to prove his love for Hayley. Sinbad points out that the price of failure is losing his privates as Sinbad had done. Jeff tries anyway, but apparently fails the test of The Majestic until he realizes that only bad memories were shown. He confronts The Majestic and it reveals that it was ordered to show only bad memories after Emperor Zing lost his own love. Jeff and the slaves start a revolt. With Sinbad's help, Jeff makes his way to an escape pod as The Majestic reveals the Emperor's own love life that was ruined by Roger cheating on him. The rest of his people join the rebellion against him, leaving only his own guards to fight for him. Sinbad sends Jeff on his way while holding off the guards at the cost of his own life. Unfortunately, Jeff finds out that he must explore thousands of worlds to find the right Earth. It is revealed during the credits that Sinbad came back as a Jedi-like ghost to join Jeff in his journey. In "Longest Distance Relationship", Sinbad's ghost is still traveling with Jeff as they try to find their way back to their Earth.
- Dr. Kalgary (voiced by Alan Tudyk) – A German-accented mad scientist acquainted with Klaus. He first appears in the episode "Roots" where Steve goes to him hoping he can help him grow, but changes his mind after Stan tells him that he had the same stall in his growth at that age. In "Family Plan", Kalgary gets married. He is often accompanied by his creation Billy, an extremely fragile boy (voiced by Kevin Michael Richardson).

== Appearing in The Golden Turd ==
As seen in "Homeland Insecurity", it is revealed that Roger's excrement is solid gold and jewel-encrusted. The Golden Turd enters the life of different characters which often end with someone dying or suffering some other terrible fate. The following characters appear in "The Golden Turd" sketches:

- Mikey and Jim (voiced by Mike Barker and Elias Koteas respectively) – Two best friends who work for the Langley Falls public works department. They both find Roger's Golden Turd in "Homeland Insecurity" which resulted in Mikey getting killed by Jim who then hides his body. When Jim plans to call his fiancé Abby to tell them that they are rich, another man answers the phone, revealing that Abby is having an affair. Jim screams upon this reaction. In "Failure is Not a Factory-Installed Option", Jim regrets what he has done to Mikey and the fact that Abby is having an affair. Jim commits suicide by driving his car onto the train tracks and right in front of an approaching train.
- Lt. Eddie Thacker (voiced by Beau Bridges) – A police lieutenant who investigates Jim's suicide. He finds the Golden Turd amongst the wreckage and hides it from his partner Chris. Eddie brings it home to his wife Marilyn where he tells her how it will pay for a great retirement and a house in Boca Raton. When Eddie changes his mind, Marilyn secretly adds rat poisoning to his tea. In "Blagsnarst: A Love Story", it was confirmed that Eddie died from the poisoned tea.
- Marilyn Thacker (voiced by Swoosie Kurtz) – The wife of Eddie Thacker. She sees the Golden Turd that Eddie brought home as he states that it will help pay for a great retirement and a house in Boca Raton. After Eddie changes his mind, Marilyn secretly adds rat poisoning to his tea. In "Blagsnart: A Love Story", Marilyn Thacker had been arrested by the police offscreen for the death of her husband and was seen being executed by lethal injection at the Virginia State Prison.
- Vincent Thacker-Edmonds (voiced by Corey Stoll) – The son of Eddie Thacker and Marilyn Thacker. After Eddie was killed by his wife's tea filled with rat poisoning, Vincent was present when his mother was executed by lethal injection. Following his mother's death, Vincent works to become an attorney general when he finds the Golden Turd under the floorboards. Vincent then contacts Wyatt Borden with plans to help him out and get him to become President of the United States. In "Father's Daze", Vincent has continued his obsession of the Golden Turd until his campaign manager confronts him about his motives. Spying the Golden Turd, the campaign manager gets into a struggle with Vincent which ends in his death. Moments after Vincent's death, the campaign manager is shot by Vincent's arriving bodyguards.
- The Pope (voiced by Dee Bradley Baker) – Following the death of Vincent Edmonds and his campaign manager, the Pope was given the Golden Turd by a cleaning lady that found the Golden Turd while she was cleaning out the room where Vincent Edmonds was killed. The Pope then meets with the board of religious leaders who begin to wonder how to return it to its proper place. The final scene showed a tablet that has Roger astride across an Egyptian Pyramid. In "300", the religious leaders fall under its spell and kill each other in a gunfight. The Knights Turdler who began guarding the Golden Turd find that a delivery girl is immune to it as they task her to return it to Roger.

== See also ==
- List of characters in the Family Guy franchise
