= Kondo (disambiguation) =

Kondo is a Japanese surname.

Kondo or Kondō may also refer to:

- Kondo, Kale, a village in Burma
- Kondo, Mali, a village
- Kon-dō (literally Golden Hall (金堂) in Japanese), is usually the main hall of a Buddhist temple, e.g. in Hōryū-ji, Nara Prefecture
- In physics, the Kondo effect regards the presence of a magnetic impurity in a solid
- The KHR-Series humanoid robots manufactured by Kondo Kagaku

== See also ==
- Condo (disambiguation)
- Kondos, people with this surname
