= Contos =

Contos may refer to:

== Currency ==
- Conto, the unofficial multiple of the Portuguese escudo: 1 conto meant 1,000$00, 2 contos meant 2,000$00 and so on.
- Contos de réis, one million réis (or one thousand mil-réis, written 1.000$000) of the Portuguese real

== People ==
- Contos (surname)

== Other uses ==
- Contos (Eça de Queiroz), a collection of short stories by the Portuguese writer Eça de Queiroz. It was first published in 1902, two years after his death.

== See also ==
- Conto
- Kontos (disambiguation)
