= Condo (surname) =

Condo is a surname. Notable people with the surname include:

- A.D. Condo (1872 – 1956), American cartoonist
- Ray Condo (1950 – 2004), Canadian rockabilly singer, saxophonist and guitarist
- George Condo (born 1957), American visual artist who works in painting, drawing, sculpture and printmaking
- Joseph P. Condo (1848 – 1923), American politician
- Jon Condo (born 1981), former American football long snapper

== See also ==
- Condo (disambiguation)
- Condos (surname)
- Kondo
