= Natsue =

- Gender: Female

Origin
- Origin: Japanese
- Meaning: Different meanings depending on the kanji used

Natsue (written: 夏枝, 奈津枝, なつえ in hiragana or ナツエ in katakana) is a feminine Japanese given name. Notable people with the name include:

- Natsue Koikawa (鯉川 なつえ; born 1972), Japanese athlete
- Natsue Kondo (近藤 奈津枝; born 1966), Japanese admiral
- Natsue Seki (関 ナツエ; born 1966), Japanese cyclist
- Natsue Shimada (島田 夏枝; born 1950), Japanese handball player
- Natsue Yoshimura (吉村 夏枝; born 1973), Japanese singer
