= Kontos =

Kontos may refer to:

- Kontos (weapon), a pole weapon
- Kontos (surname), a Greek surname
- Contus, a pike with a pointed iron at the one end.
