= Bully for Steve =

- American Dad! episode
- Episode no.: Season 5 Episode 16
- Directed by: Rodney Clouden
- Written by: Matt Fusfeld; Alex Cuthbertson
- Production code: 5AJN11
- Original air date: April 25, 2010

Guest appearances
- Cleo King as Crossing Guard; Kevin Michael Richardson as Principal Lewis; Jeff Fischer as Jeff Fischer; Erik Durbin as Reginald Koala

Episode chronology
← Previous "Merlot Down Dirty Shame"	Next → "An Incident at Owl Creek"
- American Dad! season 6

"Bully for Steve" is the sixteenth episode of the fifth season of the American animated television series American Dad!. The 94th episode of the series overall, it first aired on Fox in the United States on April 25, 2010. In the episode, Stan is unhappy with Steve's passive behavior, so he poses as a bully to "toughen him up", despite Francine's disapproval, but Stan gets what he deserve as Steve recognizes Stan's hypocrisy. Meanwhile, Hayley and Jeff reconnect after they run into each other at a carnival.

"Bully for Steve" was written by Matt Fusfeld and Alex Cuthbertson and was directed by Rodney Clouden. It contains the reappearance of recurring character Reginald, continuing his relationship storyline with Hayley, which was previously set up in "Return of the Bling". The episode features guest performances of Jeff Fischer, Kevin Michael Richardson, Cleo King, and Erik Durbin. The episode was rated TV-14-DLV in its original broadcast.

== Plot ==
Stan learns that Steve is too passive and resorts to confronting Steve as a bully. Steve quickly figures out the bully is his own dad. After a physical confrontation, Steve comes home injured, and Stan asks him, "What happened?" to which Steve recounts what Stan blatantly did. Stan changes the topic to his own high school experience being bullied by a student named Stelio Kontos. He also tells Steve that, as bullies do not just go away, he must deal with them, but when Steve asks Stan how he dealt with Stelio, he says Stelio moved away. Francine opposes this approach, saying that violence is never the answer, so Stan threatens to beat Steve up further if he ever tells her he is being bullied by his dad. Francine notifies Principal Lewis of her increasing concern for Steve, and despite Stan's threats to keep Steve from telling, Lewis reviews the security camera. Francine becomes furious with Stan when she finds out that he is the bully. Nervous, Stan flees from the school, with Francine chasing him, eventually crashing her car into his SUV as he tries to escape from her wrath.

Enraged at Stan's actions, Francine tries to train Steve to fight back, but is unsuccessful, and Steve is unable to dodge Stan with an old lady disguise. Finally accepting that he cannot avoid being bullied, Steve decides to settle things at the school playground the next day at 3:00. However, instead of fighting himself, Steve hires Stelio Kontos to beat Stan up and to give him a taste of his own medicine. The hypocrite Stan complains to Steve for not doing it himself (despite the fact that Stan never did stand up to Stelio and even now makes no effort to fight against him), Steve says this counts and waits for Stan to admit defeat. Stelio brutally beats Stan, leaving him bloodied and bruised to the point where he finally admits defeat. After the fight, Stan is considerably injured and humiliated, but respectfully acknowledges Steve for overcoming his bully in his own way.

Concurrently to the main plot, Reginald asks Hayley out on a date, which she agrees. They arrive at the carnival and encounter Jeff Fischer, who is working there. After engaging in a brief conversation with each other, Hayley and Jeff reconnect, with Reginald understanding. In another subplot, Roger attempts a career as a crime scene photographer, and finally achieves success with a picture of Stan's injuries from the fight. He is assigned to a "brutal triple rape right off the freeway" by Captain Crunch.

== Production ==
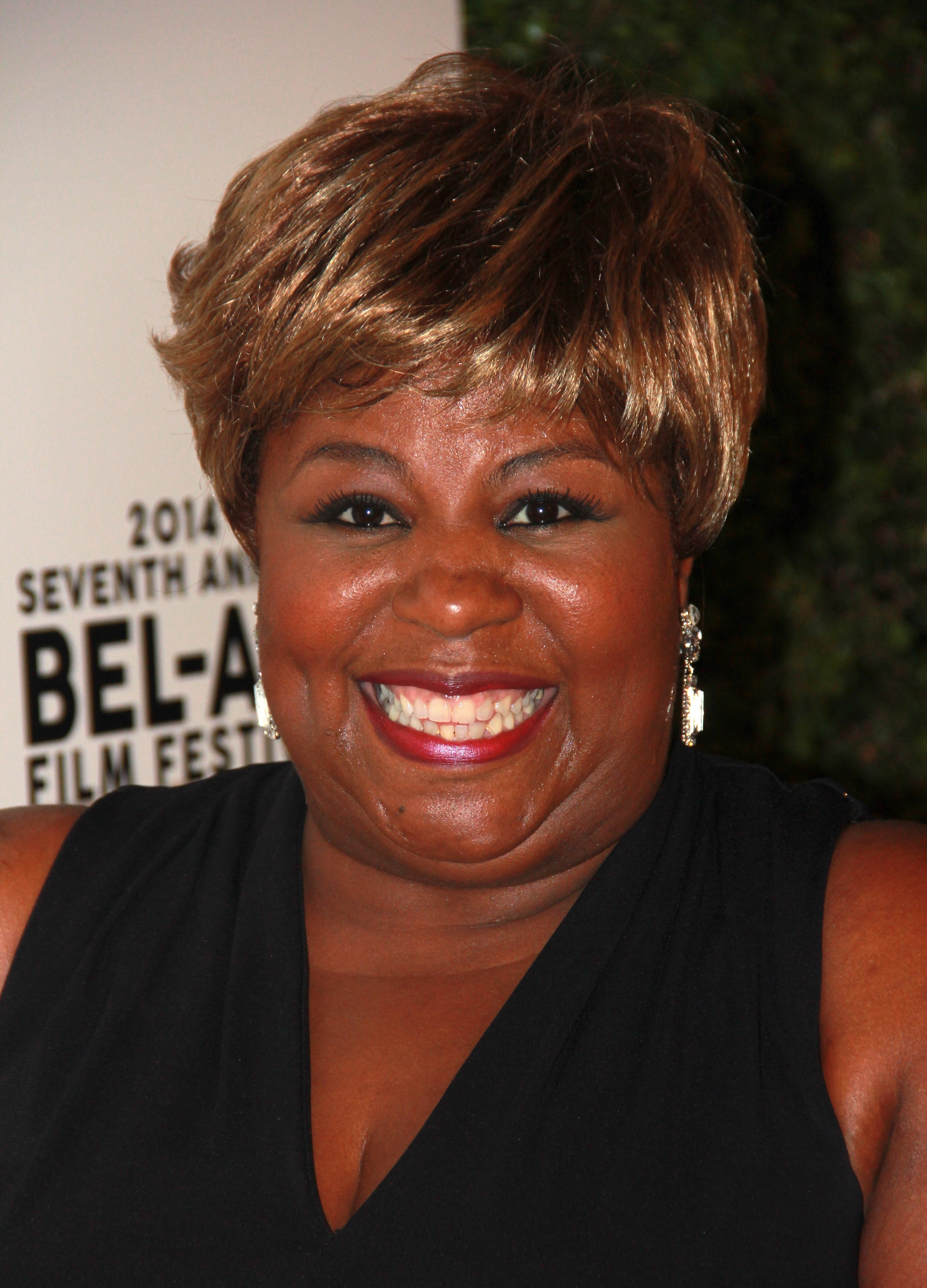
Cleo King guest starred as the voice of an unnamed crossing guard.

"Bully for Steve" was written by series regulars Matt Fusfeld and Alex Cuthbertson and was directed by Rodney Clouden. It is the second episode that Clouden, Fusfeld, and Cuthbertson worked on in season 6, their previous collaboration being "Don't Look a Smith Horse in the Mouth." Ron Hughart and Brent Woods served as supervising directors for "Bully for Steve." Erik Sommers served as the main producer for the episode, with Laura McCreary and Erik Durbin serving as co-producers, along with Chris McKenna and Matt McKenna as supervising producers. Walter Murphy, a regular music composer for the music of MacFarlane-produced shows, including the opening theme songs of American Dad! and The Cleveland Show, composed the music for the episode.

In addition to the regular cast, actress Cleo King guest starred in the episode. Recurring voice actors Jeff Fischer and Kevin Michael Richardson, and co-producer Erik Durbin also guest starred in the episode.

== Cultural references ==
A recurring gag throughout the episode is Stan insulting Steve with a sexual joke involving the usage of the phrase, "That's what your mom said last night," a variation of the original phrase, "That's what she said." When Stan is driving in his SUV right after fleeing the high school, he sings a soundtrack of Drops of Jupiter by the musical group Train. Francine directly mentions the marine theme park SeaWorld when she says she needs to "punch a dolphin", while Steve mentions the social networking site Facebook, where he says he found Stelio Kontos. Towards the end of the episode, Cap'n Crunch appears at the police station when he decides to give Roger the job for presenting the injured Stan, demonstrating Roger's talents in crime scene photography.

== Reception ==
"Bully for Steve" was broadcast on April 25, 2010, as a part of an animated television night on Fox, and was preceded by The Simpsons, The Cleveland Show, and Family Guy. It was watched by 5.31 million viewers, according to Nielsen ratings. The episode also acquired a 2.7/7 rating in the 18–49 demographic, beating The Cleveland Show but scoring below The Simpsons and Family Guy. The episode's ratings increased slightly from the show's last episode, "Merlot Down Dirty Shame," and its total viewership increased by 2.65%.

The episode's main plot was met with positive reception by television critics and fans alike upon its initial release, while its subplot received mixed reception. The Los Angeles Times Show Tracker blog gave a positive review to the episode. They comment its main plot, Stan teaching Steve a lesson, as "the next best thing to Roger’s insanity."

Jason Hughes of TV Squad also praised the episode overall, commenting that the main plot of Stan bullying Steve "was a stroke of genius by the creators of 'American Dad.'" Hughes said it "fits in perfectly with [Steve's] character." He added "it led to so many other funny moments in the episode," noting both instances of the janitor's sudden werewolf transformation at school and the footage showing Principal Lewis "drinking an entire case of beer and peeing on the basketball hoop before heading off." However, he gave a mixed review to the episode's subplot involving the relationship between Hayley and Reginald, saying he could not "bring [him]self to really care about this relationship, or even Reginald at all."

In a simultaneous review of the episode of The Simpsons that preceded the show, Todd VanDerWuff of The A.V. Club gave "Bully for Steve" a positive review, saying that the episode overall was "just purely funny." He praised Stan for "missing more and more work for this ridiculous quest to make Steve a better man," as well as Stelio Kontos for his own theme song and his fight scene with Stan. Overall, VanDerWuff said that the episode's main plot worked, suggesting that the relationship between Stan and Steve, their "mutual lack of understanding," is analogous to that between Homer and Lisa in The Simpsons. However, like Hughes of TV Squad, VanDerWuff criticized the episode's secondary plot, commenting Hayley and Reginald's relationship, "which seems to have reached its ending [...], continues to just not work, [...] since the ending to the storyline was fairly abrupt and out of nowhere." He rated the episode an A−, the highest grade of the night, scoring higher than The Simpsons episode "The Squirt and the Whale."

Ryan Scott of SlashFilm named the episode "American Dad's finest hour", praising it as "utter, over-the-top, madcap perfection". Ryan went on to praise all plots of the episode, calling the critically panned B-plot "good…to support the story". He ends by calling "Bully for Steve" a "perfect episode of TV", inviting the reader to watch the episode and "bring some laughs to your day and partake in some brilliant comedy".
