= Jeff Fischer (actor) =

American voice actor

Jeff Fischer is an American voice actor known for his work in commercials, cartoons, and video games. He is also a vintner and the founder of Habit Winery in Santa Maria, California. He is known for voicing a fictionalized version of himself on American Dad! (2005–present).

== Biography ==
=== Voice actor ===
Jeff Fischer was attending the University of Arizona when he started his voice actor career, his first gig being a Pizza Hut commercial. Since 2005, he has provided the voice of an American Dad! character named after himself, the character Jeff Fischer.

Beyond American Dad!, Fischer's other animation credits include the role of MC Cobra in Jackie Chan Adventures and a guest-starring role as Doug Reisman in Spider-Man: The New Animated Series. Fischer played Lewis in a stage production of Blockage. In 2005, he announced the Teen Choice Awards.

Fischer has also voiced several characters in video games, such as Pimp My Ride, Tony Hawk's Underground, and the Final Fantasy series, and has supplied voiceovers for hundreds of television commercials.

=== Wine maker ===
Fischer is a vintner and founded Habit Winery in Santa Maria, California, in 2008. He got into the wine business at a time when he was going to auditions during the day and waiting tables at night. He started to study the production of wine, and to make wine in his own garage. In 1995, he released his first batch of 10 cases.

He has lived in a trailer parked in the vineyards, does most of the wine processing himself, and works with the Coastal Vineyard Care Association (CVCA) to source his grapes. His wine was featured many times on American Dad!, the first time was when Roger (the alien) made a grocery list containing Habit wine. The growth of his wine-making activity was fast, from 50 cases in 2009, to 1,300 cases in 2012, and 2,000 in 2013.

The label of Habit wines, a reaching hand, was featured at the San Francisco Museum of Modern Art.

== Filmography ==
=== Film ===
Year	Title	Role	Notes
2000	Dinosaur	Additional voices	
2001	City Guys	Caller #2	
2002	Lilo & Stitch	Additional voices	
2003	Sommerhitze	Jorg	
2004	Sommersturm	Flasche	
2005	Der Feigling	Gang Member	
2005	Homerun	Henry	
2006	Happy Feet	Additional voices	
2006	Whisper of the Heart	Additional voices	2006 Disney dub
2008	Turok: Son of Stone	Additional voices	
2008	Miracle at St. Anna	Nazi Soldier	
2009	Jennifer's Body	Voice actor	
2009	Onkel Dieter	Additional voices	
2009	Garfield's Pet Force	Additional voices	
2012	Chronicle	Thug #3	
2017	Smurfs: The Lost Village	Additional voices	
2019	The Angry Birds Movie 2	Additional voices	
2020	The SpongeBob Movie: Sponge on the Run	Additional voices	
2022	Paws of Fury: The Legend of Hank	Additional voices	
2023	Godzilla Minus One	Additional voices	English dub

=== Television ===
Year	Title	Role	Notes
1998	Melrose Place	Gus	
2002–2005	Jackie Chan Adventures	MC Cobra, Chip	
2003	Spider-Man: The New Animated Series	Doug Reisman	
2004	King of the Hill	Football Guard	
2005–present	American Dad!	Jeff Fischer, Rusty's son	
2009	How I Met Your Mother	Foosball Player	
2011	Doc McStuffins	Lenny	
2012–2014	Star Wars: The Clone Wars	Petro, Trainer, Parsel	
2015–2016	iZombie	Additional voices	
2016	Bob's Burgers	Walla	
2016	Person of Interest	Warren Franco	Voice; Uncredited
2022	Ozark	Sponsor	

=== Video games ===
Year	Title	Role	Notes
2003	Tony Hawk's Underground	Brat Kid	
2004	Tony Hawk's Underground 2	Male Player Voice #3	
2006	Pimp My Ride	Voice	
2009	Infamous	Male Pedestrian	
2009	Lego Indiana Jones 2: The Adventure Continues	Coronado Sailor	
2010	Final Fantasy XIII	Yuj	
2011	Final Fantasy XIII-2	Yuj	
2015	Final Fantasy Type-0 HD	Eight	
2018	Final Fantasy Awakening	Eight	
2020	Twin Mirror	Zach	
