= Contos (surname) =

Contos is a surname of Greek origin. Notable people with the surname include:

- Adam Contos, CEO of RE/MAX
- Theresa Contos (born 1959), American former handball player
- Chanel Contos, Australian sexual assault activist

== See also ==
- Condos (surname)
