= Cops and Roger =

- American Dad! episode
- Episode no.: Season 6 Episode 14
- Directed by: Tim Parsons
- Written by: Erik Durbin
- Production code: 5AJN06
- Original air date: April 11, 2010

Guest appearance
- Bobby Cannavale as Chaz Migliaccio

Episode chronology
← Previous "The Return of the Bling"	Next → "Merlot Down Dirty Shame"
- American Dad! season 6

"Cops and Roger" is the fourteenth episode of the sixth season and the ninety second overall episode of the animated comedy series American Dad!. It aired on Fox in the United States on April 11, 2010, and is written by Erik Durbin and directed by Tim Parsons.

In the episode, after Roger and Francine are mugged, Roger enters the police academy and falls in with a corrupt detective. Meanwhile, Hayley makes a new friend, which might disrupt a long-standing relationship.

== Plot ==
Roger and Francine plan a day of shopping while Stan is doing a stakeout. When they are mugged, Roger flees in panic and Francine ends up with a black eye. Feeling insecure about his manhood, Roger joins the Langley Falls Police Academy after watching an ad for it. Things go poorly initially, as Roger is in poor physical shape and cannot correctly state the Miranda rights. When Stan tells Roger that not everyone is cut out to be a cop and it's time to give up, Roger breaks down, admitting he wishes he could be a real man like Stan. Realizing Roger is serious, Stan trains Roger and helps him succeed in becoming a police officer. Roger does so well that he comes under the eye of crooked cop Chaz Migliaccio, who soon teaches Roger how to take advantage of his position by first beating up his mugger. Stan notices Roger's actions when he assaults the criminals Stan is staking out and is astonished that Roger is a dirty cop after only being on the force for 3 hours.

Roger commits more crimes, acts overconfidently, and harasses people. Stan confronts Roger, telling him that he is acting dishonourably; Roger responds that he now feels like he has all the power he lacked before and likes it. Stan decides to turn Roger in, but Chaz gets word and orders Roger to kill Stan. However, Stan gives the tape of their crimes to Roger, choosing to believe in Roger's original intention of being a good cop and trusting him to do the right thing. When Roger meets with Chaz at a warehouse, he finds Chaz has captured Stan, gives Roger a gun, and orders Roger to kill him. Roger tells him that Stan gave the tape to him, but Chaz believes Stan will turn them in no matter what. Roger turns the gun on Chaz, but it is not loaded. Chaz pursues Roger, managing to shoot him in the shoulder. Roger climbs up a rope, and in an act of desperation, performs an elbowdrop directly on Chaz's head, causing it to explode from the impact, killing him (which Roger notes was unexpected). In the end, Stan assures Roger that he is proud of him for doing the right thing.

Meanwhile, Hayley apologizes to Reginald for coming on to him in the previous episode and suggests a double date with Ian and Rhonda. On their date, Hayley and Reginald flirt constantly, much to the annoyance of their partners; Rhonda is distraught when Reginald abruptly reveals that she has acid reflux. Later, Hayley and Reginald watch a movie about their exact situation, which is severely tempting them. The next day, Reginald reveals he broke up with Rhonda, and Hayley responds that she also broke up with Ian. Reginald suggests a date, and Hayley accepts. After Reginald leaves, Hayley calls Ian and breaks up with him.

== Reception ==
Emily VanDerWerff of The A.V. Club gave the episode a C, saying "I had some mild laughs at the story of Reginald and Haley trying to fight their attraction for each other, but this storyline still feels like the show's attempts to do a continuing storyline in the background of everything else. And while that might be admirable, I'm not sure this is the continuing storyline the show should be focusing on. It wasn't a terrible episode, just a disappointing one, from a show I hold to a higher standard than any of the other three, and I hope the show shakes it off quickly." The episode was watched by a total of 5.09 million people, this made it the third most watched show on Animation Domination that night, beating The Cleveland Show but losing to The Simpsons and Family Guy with 6.93 million.

Media watchdog group the Parents Television Council, a frequent critic of American Dad! and other Seth MacFarlane-produced television programs, named "Cops and Roger" its "Worst TV Show of the Week" for the week ending April 16, 2010. In its review, the PTC recognized the comedic value of slapstick in comedy, but said the scene where Roger kills Chaz, and the graphic depiction therein — the explosion of Chaz's head is replayed five times — "crossed that line" between hilarious and gratuitous.
