= Condominium (disambiguation) =

A condominium is a type of living space similar to an apartment.

Condominium may also refer to:

- Condominium (film), a 1980 American TV film
  - Condominium, a novel by John D. MacDonald, on which the film was based
- Condominium (international law), a political territory
- Condominium (tunicate), a genus of tunicates in the family Protopolyclinidae
- Condominio ('Condominium'), a 1991 Italian comedy drama film
- El Condominio ('the Condominium'), a Puerto Rican TV show 2000–2005

== See also ==
- CoDominium
- Condo (disambiguation)
