= Condo (disambiguation) =

A condo or condominium is a residential building ownership plan.

Condo may also refer to:

- Condo games, an illicit genre of games on Roblox
- Condo (TV series), a 1983 American sitcom
- Condo (surname), a list of people with the name

== See also ==
- Condominium (disambiguation)
- Kondo (disambiguation)
