= G-String Circus =

- American Dad! episode
- Episode no.: Season 6 Episode 8
- Directed by: Bob Bowen
- Written by: Erik Durbin
- Production code: 4AJN21
- Original air date: November 29, 2009

Guest appearances
- Kat Dennings as Tanqueray; Donald Faison as Christopher Turk; Jim Rash as Bouncer

Episode chronology
← Previous "My Morning Straitjacket"	Next → "Rapture's Delight"
- American Dad! season 6

"G-String Circus" is the eighth episode of the sixth season of American Dad!. It aired on November 29, 2009, on Fox. This episode mainly centers on Stan, who is saddened by the fact that Hayley refuses to take any advice from him. Stan goes to a strip club with his CIA co-workers, where he meets a stripper named Tanqueray, who he decides to take under his wing to prove Hayley wrong about not taking his advice. His plan for a dry-cleaning business ultimately fails, and in order to pay off the debt, Stan becomes a stripper. With the large amount of money he receives from stripping, Stan tries to hide away the fact that he is stripping in order to prove Hayley wrong.

This episode was written by Erik Durbin and directed by Bob Bowen. It was met with mixed reception from most television critics, with much of the praise coming from the development of the storyline centering on the relationship between Hayley and Stan. This episode was viewed by 6.4 million homes during its initial airing, and it garnered a 3.3 rating in the 18-49 demographic, according to the Nielson ratings. It featured guest appearances from Kat Dennings, Donald Faison, and Jim Rash, along with several recurring voice actors and actresses of the show.

== Plot ==
When Hayley announces she is taking a semester off to raise money for charity through organic mulch, Stan is depressed because she is not interested in his idea to start a dry cleaning business instead. Meanwhile, Deputy Director Bullock finds out they must spend any remaining money in the CIA budget immediately or face cutbacks the following year. They spend the money at a strip club. Stan meets a stripper named Tanqueray and talks her into a dry cleaning business after she takes his advice about eating a banana to help her with a potassium deficiency. Hayley's business takes off while Stan's goes into the tank. Stan decides the answer is to hire even more strippers. Roger promptly puts them on the internet and taunts Steve. Feeling bad that Stan's business is failing, Tanqueray goes back to stripping to make money for Stan. Stan shows up at the club but finds out it is "ladies night" and the girls have left. The club manager is impressed with Stan's physique and talks him into dancing for money when the club is short of dancers. Stan passes off the money he makes as money earned from his dry cleaning business. Roger takes Hayley to the club to cheer her up because she is depressed that Stan appears to be succeeding. She sees him dancing as a stripper and realizes Stan has lied about how he earned the money. Hayley returns home to find Tanqueray, who suggests she appreciate her father's advice as she leaves.

Meanwhile, Steve and his friends discover they have been accepted to Space Camp. The time at camp will be spent doing unexciting, administrative things. When Steve sees the girls Roger has in his room making out with each other, he and the gang decide to escape. When they get home, they find the girls have already left. Roger tosses them a G-string to fawn over until he tells them it was Stan's.

== Reception ==
"G-String Circus" was broadcast on November 29, 2009 as part of the animation television block on Fox. It was preceded by The Simpsons, and its sister shows The Cleveland Show and Family Guy. It was watched by 6.4 million homes during its original airing, despite simultaneously airing with Sunday Night Football on NBC, Desperate Housewives on ABC, and A Dog Named Christmas on CBS. It acquired a 3.3 rating in the 18-49 demographic. The episode's total viewership and ratings increased at a considerable rate from the previous episode, "My Morning Straitjacket", which was watched by 5.52 million homes during its initial airing, and got a 2.8 rating in the 18-49 demographic.

"G-String Circus" was met with generally positive reception from television critics. Emily VanDerWerff of The A.V. Club gave the main plot a positive review, writing, "I liked how it was built on the relationship he has with Haley [sic], which is one of the relationships the show could do more work with." However, he criticized the delivery of the plot, calling it "predictable". Jason Hughes of TV Squad gave the episode a positive review, saying, "Everything about this episode was on fire. Stan's ridiculous scheme to have his gaggle of mentally vacant strippers run a dry-cleaning service, to his own turn as a stripper to try and earn back the money he was losing on the dry cleaning business. I would have liked to see a bit more of just how horrible the Space Camp experience was for Steve and his friends, but I still appreciated their disturbing rise from the mud and ultimate escape." He went on to praise the episode for its humor, writing, "The highlight for me was when Roger called Steve, who was at the worst Space Camp ever, and showed him the strippers cavorting around his room, and making out on his bed. At least I thought that was the highlight, until Roger instigated a pillow fight, knocking one of the girls out cold with his pillowcase of full soda cans."
