= Kondos =

Kondos is a surname of Greek origin. Notable people with the surname include:

- Gregory Kondos (1923–2021), American painter;
- Louis Kondos (born 1946), Greek soap opera actor;
- Valorie Kondos Field (born 1959), American gymnastics coach of Greek descent;
- Yannis Kondos (1943–2015), Greek poet.

== See also ==
- Köndös, a Finnish minor deity
