= My Morning Straitjacket =

- American Dad! episode
- Episode no.: Season 6 Episode 7
- Directed by: Chris Bennett
- Written by: Mike Barker
- Production code: 4AJN22
- Original air date: November 22, 2009

Guest appearances
- Zach Galifianakis as heavyset man/Norman; My Morning Jacket as themselves

Episode chronology
← Previous "Shallow Vows"	Next → "G-String Circus"
- American Dad! (season 6)

"My Morning Straitjacket" is the seventh episode of the sixth season and the eighty fourth overall episode of the animated comedy series American Dad!. It aired on Fox in the United States on November 22, 2009, and is written by Mike Barker and directed by Chris Bennett.

In the episode, when Stan crashes a My Morning Jacket concert to drag Hayley out of it, he decides that he likes the band so much that he becomes a groupie and follows them on the road.

== Plot ==
Stan gets angry when Hayley is not at the dinner table because she has gone to a rock concert, which he considers to be a bad influence. Stan decides to scare Hayley straight by dressing up as a spider when she comes home, but Hayley defends herself against Stan and says that she is going to see My Morning Jacket when they play the next evening. Stan swallows Hayley's ticket, but Francine later retrieves it from Stan's body using tongs, then reminisces with Hayley about her own concert-going days, remarking on how hard she had to work to get backstage. While Hayley is at the concert Francine has Roger dress up as Hayley. Stan does not notice at first, but the ruse fails when Francine calls Roger by name. Stan races to the concert, only to find himself entranced by the music, leading to disasters around the house, such as Francine almost choking to death on the cord of a vacuum, eating Klaus who Francine rescues via the tongs, letting a burglar steal Francine's necklace and stab Steve in the gut, and trapping Hayley in the pool so he could dance on it.

Stan becomes obsessed with My Morning Jacket and decides to meet Jim James, believing they are soul mates and that James is writing the music specifically for him. Disguised as a reporter for Rolling Stone (an allusion to the film Almost Famous), Stan follows My Morning Jacket on tour, accompanied by Roger. Roger manages to get Stan backstage at a show and onto the tour bus, but when Stan tells a bogus story about freebasing cocaine with 'Tina Jivestrong' & 'the black guy from The Beatles', they get thrown off the bus. Roger steals a car to get them to the next concert in Albany, New York. However, Stan does not get through the backstage entrance after Roger abandons him.

Deciding to help Stan and end his quest, Francine turns up, dressed as a groupie. She effortlessly flirts and flashes her way through numerous security checkpoints, progressing from a simple hair-flip through lifting her shirt to lifting her skirt and finally making out with the last guard, a woman. Stan meets Jim James, who, after being freaked out by Stan, points out the flaws in his logic and tells him that he could not possibly be writing his songs just for him, seeing as how they never knew each other, and that Francine is the one who truly understands him. The episode ends with Francine and Stan rekindling their passion for each other (still in Jim James's dressing room) with the female security guard coming in the room to join them, closing the door behind her.

== Production ==
In a November 2009 interview the episode's writer Mike Barker spoke about how an experience at the 2008 Bonnaroo Music Festival inspired the episode, saying: "At Bonnaroo, I’m watching these guys create this lush, intense sound as the rain is washing over them… and as the sheet of rain attacks the stage, the raindrops are being illuminated by the multi-colored stage lights, and it was just… biblical. And it was one of those moments — and by moment I don’t mean during a certain chorus or something, I mean the entire time the guys are playing — it was one of those moments where everyone in attendance realized they were witnessing something really special. No one’s worried about getting wet, or getting their shoes muddy, or needing to sit down after standing shoulder to shoulder with wet strangers for four straight hours. And I actually remember having the thought, “If lightning strikes these guys dead, there’s not a thing tragic about that.” Seriously, can you tell me a better way for a musician to go? Because I can't think of it. But during the show, I start to become aware of how intensely I loved this music, and by extension, these guys for playing it. And I thought to myself, “What if I try to share this experience through the characters in American Dad? Is it possible to translate how much I love this music to a large portion of American Dad’s audience that presently has no idea that this band even exists?” That would be my way of giving back, I suppose. My Morning Jacket is one of the greatest bands of all time, so why wouldn't I try to share that fact?"

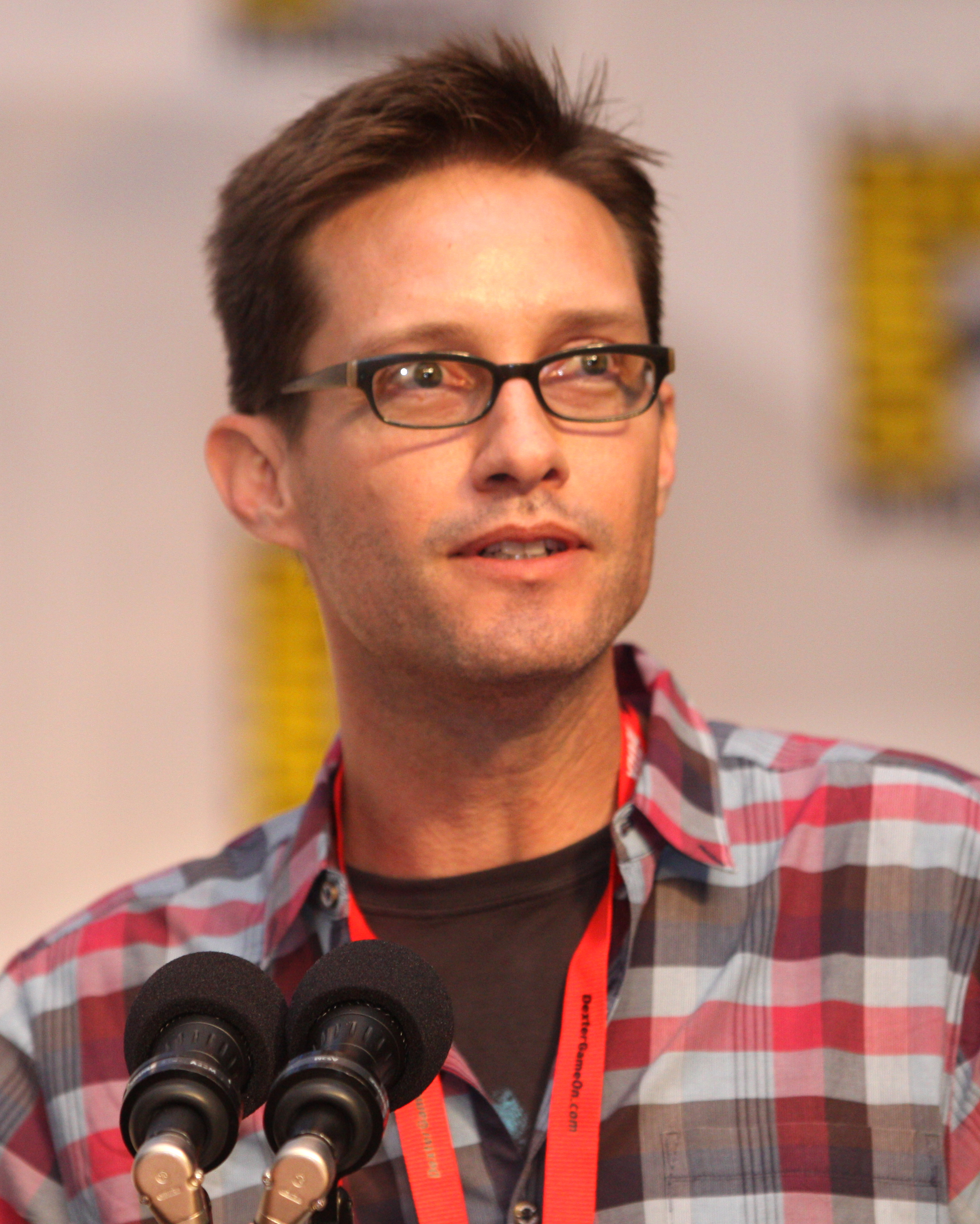
American Dad! co-creator Mike Barker wrote the episode.

He also spoke about producing the episode, saying: "I was definitely conscious of the fact that the band could end up hating this episode and resenting me for not delivering like I had assured them I would. I mean, it’s tricky. Normally when we (the writers) make our episodes, our primary rule is that we have to make ourselves laugh. We have to find the episode interesting and funny. Because if we’re laughing, then there’s a good chance our audience is laughing, too. But with this episode… well, suddenly there’s this entirely new segment of people that will be watching the show, many of them for the first time, and that’s the My Morning Jacket fans. And the fans have certain thoughts and feelings about both the music, as well as the guys making it. The last thing I want is for my episode — which is really a pretty personal creative experiment — is for it to somehow reflect negatively back on the band. Jim and the guys were really great at respecting my autonomy throughout the process. This is a story I wanted to tell, and basically they took a big leap of faith by entrusting me, this absolute stranger, with their music, their voices, and ultimately, their image. So perhaps the most important thing for me in regards to the band was to do everything in my power to make sure that the episode didn’t suck. Because if it’s bad, or embarrassing, then that leads to questions from the fans like “Why would MMJ do this?” and suddenly this incredibly thoughtful and principled band is on the firing line for selling out or something."

He also spoke about if the band had any input on their character designs, saying: "We gave the band customary consultation and they signed off on all of the artwork we ran by them. It’s always tricky animating real people. Because you’re not just animating them to resemble who they are in real life, you also have to make sure they resemble characters that live in the American Dad universe, and that carries with it a whole host of challenging parameters for our animators. But I think our character designers did a great job at capturing Jim and the guys."

== Reception ==
Emily VanDerWerff of The A.V. Club gave the episode a B+, calling it the best episode of Animation Domination that night. While commenting that there had been other similar plots in which Stan had been introduced to a new obsession by another character, she said that such stories were entertaining as the character is usually uptight. The episode was watched by a total of 5.52 million people, making it the fourth most watched show on Animation Domination that night, behind The Cleveland Show, The Simpsons and Family Guy with 7.38 million.

== Music ==
The songs featured in the episode are "Touch Me I'm Going to Scream Part 2", "I'm Amazed", "Remnants", and "Highly Suspicious" from the album Evil Urges, and "Phone Went West" from At Dawn. The song most prominently featured in the episode is "Wordless Chorus" from Z. A live performance of the song taken from the concert film Okonokos plays over the ending credits. References were also made to the songs "I Will Sing You Songs" and "Mahgeeta" from the album It Still Moves.
