= Kontos (surname) =

Kontos (Greek: Κοντός, "short") is a Greek surname. Notable people with the surname include:

- Apostolos Kontos (born 1947), Greek retired basketball player and coach
- Chris Kontos (born 1963), Canadian retired ice hockey player
- Chris Kontos (musician) (born 1968), American drummer
- Dániel Köntös (born 1984), Hungarian footballer
- George Kontos (born 1985), American baseball pitcher
- Yannis Kontos (born 1971), Greek freelance photojournalist

== Fictional characters ==
- Stelio Kontos, a character in the television series American Dad!

== See also ==
- Adolf Konto (1911–1965), Finnish sailor
