= Condos (surname) =

Condos is a surname. Notable people with the surname include:

- Jennifer Condos, American bass guitarist
- Jim Condos (born 1951), American politician
- Steve Condos (1918–1990), American tap dancer

== See also ==
- Condo (surname)
- Contos (surname)
