= American Dad! season 6 =

American Dad!
- Season 6
- Starring: Seth MacFarlane; Wendy Schaal; Scott Grimes; Rachael MacFarlane; Dee Bradley Baker
- No. of episodes: 18

Release
- Original network: Fox
- Original release: September 27, 2009 – May 16, 2010

Season chronology
- ← Previous; Season 5 Next → Season 7

The sixth season of the American TV series American Dad! originally aired on Fox from September 27, 2009, to May 16, 2010, and consisted of nine episodes from production line four (4AJNxx) and nine from production line five (5AJNxx). The entire season was released in the Volume Five DVD box set on April 19, 2011 in Region 1; on June 27, 2008 in Region 2; and July 13, 2008 in Region 4. The season also marked the series move to airing in 16:9 high definition on January 3, 2010 with the episode "Don't Look a Smith Horse in the Mouth".

The season initially ended its 13-episode run on February 21 with the episode "The Return of the Bling" to make room for the new Fox sitcom Sons of Tucson and was set to return to the schedule in September. However, on April 5, it was announced that Sons of Tucson was canceled after a four-episode run. The sixth season of American Dad continued with five more episodes.

The season premiered in the United Kingdom, on BBC Three on Sunday, November 6, 2011 at 10 pm, with a double bill (despite the fact it already was on FX).

== Episodes ==
No. overall	No. in season	Title	Directed by	Written by	Original release date	Prod. code	U.S. viewers (millions)
79	1	"In Country...Club"	Albert Calleros & Josue Cervantes	Judah Miller & Murray Miller	September 27, 2009	4AJN20	7.14
Stan teaches Steve that the only way he can truly appreciate the national anthem is by participating in a war re-enactment, but the experience leaves Steve looking and acting like a traumatized Vietnam War veteran. The episode parodies Vietnam War movies such as Apocalypse Now, Platoon and Forrest Gump. Meanwhile, Roger gets a pet bird and badgers Stan into giving him a cable code so he can watch a Barbra Streisand pay-per-view special. And an amputee mental patient who has psychic powers, named John Q. Mind (Randy Spears), escapes from a mental hospital on a motorcycle.
80	2	"Moon Over Isla Island"	Rodney Clouden	Jonathan Fener	October 4, 2009	4AJN15	7.14
In order to get a promotion at work, Stan has to convince the dictator of Isla Island to sign a treaty. Stan meets the general and accidentally kills him and has Roger pose as the leader of the small island nation. Meanwhile, Steve and Snot compete for the sexual advances of each other's mothers.
81	3	"Home Adrone"	Brent Woods	Erik Sommers	October 11, 2009	4AJN14	6.75
Steve is left home alone when the family takes a trip to look at a potential college for Hayley. When his friends arrive and realize he has the run of the house, they persuade Steve to break the rules. They're soon in over their heads when they discover that what they thought was a video game is actually a military controlled drone. As Hayley's flight is about to leave, the pilot sees the drone, and delays the flight for safety of the passengers. As Steve and his friends attempt to cover their tracks, Roger has a meltdown that keeps the family from making their trip by dressing as Stan instead of a little girl to get alcohol. The Air Marshall threatens to kill everyone unless the little girl (Roger) is found. Stan returns to find that Steve has betrayed his trust and thrust them into a high-level security situation.
82	4	"Brains, Brains and Automobiles"	Pam Cooke & Jansen Yee	Keith Heisler	October 18, 2009	4AJN18	6.25
Stan tries to sabotage Francine's plans to make Roger self-sufficient so Francine will not leave Stan for being boring. Meanwhile, Steve, Barry, Snot, and Toshi meet a mysterious salesman who sells them bikini underwear called "culottes."
83	5	"Man in the Moonbounce"	Tim Parsons	Brian Boyle	November 8, 2009	4AJN19	4.08
Steve must become the "man of the house" when Stan relives his childhood after an emotional breakdown on a moonbounce – and ends up in Chimdale Minimum Security prison for vandalizing a house. Meanwhile, Hayley gives Klaus a wig so he can have his first haircut in years.
84	6	"Shallow Vows"	John Aoshima	Rick Wiener & Kenny Schwartz	November 15, 2009	4AJN16	6.17
When Stan lets it slip that he only married Francine for her looks days before they renew their wedding vows, Francine purposely lets herself go so she can see if Stan really does love her. Meanwhile, Steve and Hayley go on the run when one of Roger's personalities threatens to kill them.
85	7	"My Morning Straitjacket"	Chris Bennett	Mike Barker	November 22, 2009	4AJN22	5.60
Stan becomes obsessed with Hayley's favorite band, My Morning Jacket after trying to ban her from listening to their music.
86	8	"G-String Circus"	Bob Bowen	Erik Durbin	November 29, 2009	4AJN21	6.38
Stan opens up a dry-cleaning shop with 20-year-old strippers as the workers to prove Hayley should take his advice, but when Stan's business goes south, Stan decides to take off his own clothes for money. Meanwhile, Steve and his friends go to space camp (which turns out to be boring) and try to escape when he sees a webcam shot of Roger housing Stan's stripper dry-cleaning workers in Steve's room.
87	9	"Rapture's Delight"	Joe Daniello	Chris McKenna & Matt McKenna	December 13, 2009	4AJN17	6.20
Stan is upset when he cannot find his family a good seat for a Christmas Day church service, but that proves to be the least of his worries when Stan discovers that he, Roger, and Francine are the last people left on Earth and everyone else has ascended into Heaven as part of the Biblical end of days.: Note: This is the last episode to be presented in standard-definition.
88	10	"Don't Look a Smith Horse in the Mouth"	Rodney Clouden	Matt Fusfeld & Alex Cuthbertson	January 3, 2010	5AJN01	5.90
When Stan gets told by Francine to get rid of his gas-guzzling SUV, he switch bodies with a horse to avoid losing his car. Meanwhile, Steve and his friends help an obese man out of his bedroom.: Note: This is the first episode to be presented in high-definition and widescreen.
89	11	"A Jones for a Smith"	John Aoshima & Jansen Yee	Laura McCreary	January 31, 2010	5AJN02	5.06
Stan gives Francine a hard time when she is sentenced to work in a soup kitchen following a drunk driving arrest (since Stan does not believe social programs that help the homeless and impoverished are of any value to American society), but when Stan gets hooked on crack cocaine, he refuses to get help (and costs Steve a chance to hook up with a beautiful high school girl who's attracted to nerds), but later he discovers that asking others for help does not hurt.
90	12	"May the Best Stan Win"	Pam Cooke	Murray Miller & Judah Miller	February 14, 2010	5AJN04	5.25
For Valentine's Day, Stan gives Francine "love coupons," but refuses to honor them, prompting a cyborg version of Stan from the future to steal Francine from him. Meanwhile, Steve wants to remake the 1980s movie Mannequin after finding a sex doll in Toshi's parents' room, but Roger (as the Steven Spielberg-esque Ira Segall) wants Steve and his friends to remake The Goonies instead.
91	13	"The Return of the Bling"	Joe Daniello	Nahnatchka Khan	February 21, 2010	5AJN03	5.66
Roger reveals that he played on the gold-medal-winning Miracle on Ice 1980 U.S. Olympic hockey team as a steroid-abuser. Stan is able to convince Roger to return his Olympic gold medal, but Roger has a difficult time dealing with the loss. Meanwhile, Hayley reevaluates her relationship status with Reginald the Koala.
92	14	"Cops and Roger"	Tim Parsons	Erik Durbin	April 11, 2010	5AJN06	5.13
Roger joins the police force after he and Francine are mugged, but he turns into a dirty cop, and Hayley gets a new friend.
93	15	"Merlot Down Dirty Shame"	Josue Cervantes	Brian Boyle	April 18, 2010	5AJN08	5.22
Roger winds up kissing Francine when the two go wine-tasting, leading Francine having to tell Stan so it's not bad if they told soon, but Roger tries everything to keep Francine from telling Stan. Meanwhile, Klaus and Hayley screw with Steve's head by making him think his reality is a lucid dream, but he goes too far when he tries to fly out the window.
94	16	"Bully for Steve"	Rodney Clouden	Matt Fusfeld & Alex Cuthbertson	April 25, 2010	5AJN11	5.33
Stan bullies Steve to try to toughen him up while Roger studies crime scene photography.
95	17	"An Incident at Owl Creek"	John Aoshima & Jansen Yee	Alan R. Cohen & Alan Freedland	May 9, 2010	5AJN10	5.84
In preparation for a neighborhood party, Stan tells his family to get in shape, but an accident in the pool makes Stan a laughingstock.
96	18	"Great Space Roaster"	Joe Daniello	Jonathan Fener	May 16, 2010	5AJN12	5.89
It is Roger's birthday, and he begs to be roasted, but Roger takes the cruel jokes to heart and goes on a rampage against the Smith family.

== Reception ==
The season premiere, "In Country…Club", was given generally positive reviews.
