= Pimp My Ride (video game) =

2006 video game

- Developer: Eutechnyx
- Publisher: Activision
- Platforms: Xbox 360, PlayStation 2, PlayStation Portable, Wii
- Release: PlayStation 2, Xbox 360: NA: November 21, 2006 (PS2); NA: December 6, 2006 (X360); AU: March 14, 2007; EU: March 16, 2007; PlayStation Portable: NA: April 3, 2007; AU: April 26, 2007; EU: December 7, 2007; Wii: NA: February 19, 2008; EU: September 12, 2008; AU: October 1, 2008
- Genres: Racing, business sim
- Mode: Single-player

Pimp My Ride is a simulation/racing game published by Activision. This game is based on the popular MTV show of the same name. It was released in 2006 for the Wii, Xbox 360, PlayStation Portable and PlayStation 2. It was panned for its poor physics, lack of replay value, and repetitive gameplay.

== Gameplay ==
In the game, players are challenged to pimp out their customers' cars by Xzibit, transforming something old and rusty into something worthy of displaying on the streets. Cars can be redesigned from bumper to bumper and it will be players' responsibilities to capture the styles, likes and interests of their clients.

To raise cash for pimping a customer's car, players can crash into other cars, play minigames, which include "Hot Steppin'", a rhythm game, and "Ghost Ride the Whip", where the player must press buttons in time, greet people by driving slowly, and pressing buttons, collect cash tokens that spell out "P-I-M-P-!", and destroying signs and parking meters.

When pimping a car, the player will compete with another customizer, and whoever scores the highest wins.

== Reception ==
Reception

Aggregate score
| Aggregator | Score | | | |
| Aggregator | PS2 | PSP | Wii | Xbox 360 |
|---|---|---|---|---|
| Metacritic | 36/100 | 24/100 | 26/100 | 38/100 |

Review scores
| Publication | Score | | | |
| Publication | PS2 | PSP | Wii | Xbox 360 |
|---|---|---|---|---|
| Eurogamer | N/A | N/A | N/A | 2/10 |
| GameRevolution | N/A | N/A | D+ | N/A |
| GameSpot | 4.5/10 | 1.7/10 | N/A | 4.5/10 |
| GamesRadar+ | 1.5/5 | N/A | 1/5 | N/A |
| GameTrailers | 4/10 | N/A | N/A | 4/10 |
| GameZone | 3.8/10 | N/A | N/A | 4.9/10 |
| IGN | 2.2/10 | 2/10 | 2.2/10 | 2.9/10 |
| Official Xbox Magazine (UK) | N/A | N/A | N/A | 4/10 |
| Official Xbox Magazine (US) | N/A | N/A | N/A | 3/10 |
| TeamXbox | N/A | N/A | N/A | 5/10 |
| X-Play | N/A | N/A | N/A | 2/5 |

The game received "unfavorable" reviews on all platforms according to video game review aggregator website Metacritic.

The PSP (PlayStation Portable) version was cited as the worst version of all and scored significantly lower than the other two versions, with critics deriding the game's frame rate, gameplay mechanics and replay value. Alex Navarro of GameSpot described the PSP version as having a "nauseatingly choppy frame rate" and commented that the game crashed "on a semi-regular basis... thus corrupting or killing your save file", summing up by saying that "there is no version of Pimp My Ride worth recommending to anyone, but the PSP version is definitely the one that should be most actively avoided".

== Pimp My Ride: Street Racing ==
A sequel named Pimp My Ride: Street Racing, developed by Virtuos and published by Activision, was released in 2009 for PlayStation 2 and Nintendo DS.
