= In Country...Club =

- American Dad! episode
- Episode no.: Season 6 Episode 1
- Directed by: Albert Calleros; Josue Cervantes
- Written by: Judah Miller; Murray Miller
- Production code: 4AJN20
- Original air date: September 27, 2009

Guest appearances
- Greg Grunberg; Estelle Harris as Tourist; David Koechner as Dick; Matt McKenna as Buckle; Robert Patrick; Randy Spears as John Q. Mind

Episode chronology
← Previous "Stan's Night Out"	Next → "Moon Over Isla Island"
- American Dad! season 6

"In Country...Club" is the first episode of the sixth season and the seventy ninth overall episode of the animated comedy series American Dad!. It aired on Fox in the United States on September 27, 2009, and is written by Judah Miller and Murray Miller and directed by Albert Calleros and Josue Cervantes.

In the episode, Stan teaches Steve that the only way he can truly appreciate the national anthem is by participating in a war re-enactment, but the experience leaves Steve looking and acting like a traumatized Vietnam War veteran. Meanwhile, Roger gets a pet bird and badgers Stan into giving him a cable code so he can watch a Barbra Streisand pay-per-view special. And an amputee mental patient who has psychic powers, named John Q. Mind, escapes from a mental hospital on a motorcycle.

== Plot ==
Steve has been chosen to sing the national anthem at the veteran's fair. However, he sings it with little passion, leading Stan to believe that the only way he can truly appreciate the national anthem is by experiencing war. Stan signs them both up for a Vietnam War reenactment held at a local country club's golf course. Upon enlisting, Steve is immediately put on guard duty, but he falls asleep, allowing the Viet Cong to attack their base and capture Stan. In a parody of Apocalypse Now, Platoon, and Forrest Gump, Steve goes on a mission to rescue his father and succeeds. But later, while singing the national anthem at the fair, fireworks are lit, sending Steve into a "war" flashback and breaking out a fight between him and other veterans. This causes Steve to be committed to a mental hospital.

Later, Steve escapes from the hospital as the doctor questions a limbless man, John Q. Mind, on how he opened the curtain. He uses his psychic powers to knock her into the wall as "Mind Quad" goes to commercial. Steve returns to the country club where the re-enactment took place (in a parody of First Blood). He interrupts the golfing, and a patron tries convincing him to leave. When that fails, the patron attempts to use force, only for Steve to snap again when he sees a spinning sprinkler, thinking of a helicopter, and attacks the patron, then holes up in the golf cart shed. Stan comes in to apologize for pushing him too far and tells him that he can sing the way he wants to. Unfortunately, Steve sings the anthem in an excited and disrespectful mode while wearing a unitard; Stan tells a fellow veteran that Steve is his neighbor's son.

Meanwhile, Roger wants to gain the code to the pay-per-view channel to see Barbra Streisand sing the songs of Celine Dion. However, Stan refuses to give it to him (he agreed when he thought it was $4.99; instead, it was $499). So Roger joins the Vietnamese side of the reenactment as Stan's warden, interrogating him while he was captured; he tortures Stan by reading the first draft of the Sex and the City film. When Stan gives him a fake code, Hayley soon gives him the real code, in exchange for setting free an ortolan bunting, a bird he was planning on cooking and eating. However, he gives her Klaus dressed as the bird. As Roger watches his show, he eats the bird (which had been cooked by Francine) and he experiences a DMT trip.

As the credits roll, the "Mind Quad" part of the episode returns as a man wearing a black trenchcoat runs into the hospital room. The doctor tells him that John has escaped. The man reveals that John's limbs were not blown off of his body but "into his mind," giving him telekinetic powers. The man vows to catch John as we see John using his psychic powers to ride a motorcycle towards the Pentagon.

== Reception ==
Emily VanDerWerff of The A.V. Club gave the episode a B−, saying "That said, I liked more of the episode than I disliked (particularly the lengthy coda where Steve couldn't shake his Vietnam War re-enactment experience), so we'll give it a moderate passing grade. I assume it will improve on a rewatch, actually." Dan Phillips of IGN gave the episode a 7.2 out of 10, saying "Considering the strength of the episode's core concept, it's a bit surprising to see the writers push the plot past it as early as they do, abandoning the hilarity of the war reenactment to explore the idea of Steve's "Post War Reenactment Traumatic Stress Disorder." What follows is a couple tired veteran jokes and a random paraplegic gag that feels like it's been scraped right off of Family Guy's cutting room floor." The episode was watched by a total of 7.12 million people; this made it the fourth most watched show on Animation Domination that night, losing to The Cleveland Show, The Simpsons and Family Guy with 10.17 million.
