= Don't Look a Smith Horse in the Mouth =

- American Dad! episode
- Episode no.: Season 6 Episode 10
- Directed by: Rodney Clouden
- Written by: Matt Fusfeld; Alex Cuthbertson
- Production code: 5AJN01
- Original air date: January 3, 2010

Guest appearances
- Curtis Armstrong as Snot Lonstein; Mike Barker as Terry Bates; Alex Cuthbertson; Anthony DeMarco; Matt Fusfeld; Don Johnson; Richard Kind as Mr. Tuttle; Michael McShane as Horse Whisperer; Erik Sommers; Daisuke Suzuki as Toshi Yoshida; Eddie Kaye Thomas as Barry Robinson

Episode chronology
| ← Previous "Rapture's Delight" | Next → "A Jones for a Smith" |
- American Dad! season 6

"Don't Look a Smith Horse in the Mouth" is the tenth episode of the sixth season of American Dad!. It aired on January 3, 2010 on Fox and is the first American Dad! episode to air in 16:9 720p high-definition.

In the episode, when Stan gets told by Francine to get rid of his gas-guzzling SUV, he and Roger hatch up a plan at the local horse track to avoid losing his car. Meanwhile, Steve and his friends help an obese man out of his bedroom.

== Plot ==
The Smiths are forced to make cutbacks because of the economic recession. When Roger tells Francine that Stan regularly spends $400 on gas for his SUV, she threatens to replace his vehicle with a Hybrid. In an attempt to save his SUV, Stan makes a bet on a local horse at a track stadium, only to watch the horse finish the race last. Outraged, Stan confronts the jockey, discovering that the jockey is Roger. Roger explains that he has given the horse tranquilizers to hold it back and reduce its odds. When the horse owner plans to kill the horse to prevent further monetary loss, Roger offers to buy it from him, and asks Stan for money. Stan is reluctant at first, but following Roger's promise that the horse is a guaranteed winner, he decides to buy it using his family's second mortgage. Roger tells Francine about the plan when she lectures Roger about eating too much cream cheese. Francine is furious, but decides to trust Stan.

Tired of hearing Roger reveal his actions to Francine, Stan thumps Roger's arm. In retaliation, Roger tricks Stan into giving the horse "a full release" to boost its confidence. The horse afterwards engages in erratic behavior. The two consult a horse whisperer (after confirming he isn't Roger, who is just the secretary), who tells them that due to being molested by Stan, the horse is in a state of shock despite its body's peak physical condition, and as a result, will never race again. Roger tells Francine of this development after she glares at him for using too much whipped cream. Using the CIA technology once used on Klaus in "Finances with Wolves," Stan switches his mind with the horse's, reasoning that with its body's peak condition he can potentially win the race, over Klaus's suggestion of putting himself in a human body and getting a job doing animal noises. Before Stan and Roger head off to the stadium, Francine approaches the horse waiting in the back of the car, unaware that the horse is Stan. Saddened, she questions why her husband prioritizes his SUV over his family, leaving Stan feeling remorseful. At the venue, Stan is unable to endure the grief of disappointing Francine. So instead of heading off to the start of the race, he rushes to Francine at the spectator seats, revealing himself to her as a horse. Stan expresses his sorrow to her in regards to his selfish actions. Francine then tells him to win, giving him confidence and an encouraging attitude, and allowing him and Roger to take first place (after Roger makes himself vomit by sticking his finger down his throat to make himself lighter).

Meanwhile, Steve and his friends get employed by an old friend, Mr. Tuttle, who has over time become an obese recluse after his wife's death. Snot volunteers to retrieve Mr. Tuttle's wallet from his back pocket to receive their paycheck, but becomes trapped underneath him. Upon running to his dad for help, Steve learns from Klaus that Stan had switched his brain with the horse's. Steve uses the horse, in Stan's body, to help lift Mr. Tuttle and free Snot. Mr. Tuttle then reveals he had the money in his neck fat instead of his back pocket and tricked them into staying with him due to his loneliness. Steve then decides to reintroduce him to the neighborhood, with the horse in Stan's body pulling him. At the end of the episode, Stan in the horse's body goes to Hollywood with Roger so that the two of them can ride together with Steven Spielberg and his talking horse.

== Reception ==
Emily VanDerWerff of The A.V. Club gave the episode a B, saying "You often hear in articles about TV writers rooms about a big white board where possible plotlines are written down, just in case the writers run out of ideas for new episodes. I kind of wonder just how long "Stan becomes a horse" was written on the American Dad board, but there was something goofily charming about the way this all played out - much less the way that everything tied together in the end - that made the episode end on a high enough note for me to give it a Grade: B." The episode was watched by a total of 5.91 million people, this made it the fourth most watched show on Animation Domination that night, losing to The Cleveland Show, Family Guy and The Simpsons with 8.65 million.

=== PTC protest ===
The Parents Television Council, a pro-censorship group and a frequent critic of Seth MacFarlane-produced programs (Family Guy being the most frequent target) urged viewers to file indecency complaints with the Federal Communications Commission regarding the scene where Stan masturbated a horse, and got sprayed in his mouth with a garden hose. The implication, the PTC said, was that "the horse has ejaculated in Stan's mouth." On June 3, 2010, in a Notice of Apparent Liability for Forfeiture, the FCC sought to fine Fox $25,000. The fine was for failing to respond to a Letter of Inquiry arising from the 100,000 complaints filed regarding this episode.
