= Theresa Contos =

American handball player

Personal information
- Full name: Theresa Ann Contos
- Nationality: American
- Born: 15 October 1959 (age 66) Syracuse, New York, U.S.

Sport
- Sport: Handball

Theresa Ann "Tess" Contos (born September 15, 1959, in Syracuse, New York) is an American former handball player who competed in the 1984 Summer Olympics.
