= Rapture's Delight =

- American Dad! episode
- Episode no.: Season 6 Episode 9
- Directed by: Joe Daniello
- Written by: Chris McKenna; Matt McKenna
- Production code: 4AJN17
- Original air date: December 13, 2009
- Running time: 21 minutes

Guest appearances
- Mike Barker as Terry; Paget Brewster as Michelle; Will Forte as Jesus; Skyler Gisondo as TV announcer; Tom Kenny as Jo-Jo; Matt McKenna as Jesus H. Christ; Murray Miller as Slow Janitor; Martin Mull as Father Donovan; Andy Samberg as Ricky the Raptor & The Anti-Christ; Don Tai Theerathada as Qui-Lo

Episode chronology
← Previous "G-String Circus"	Next → "Don't Look a Smith Horse in the Mouth"
- American Dad! season 6

"Rapture's Delight" is the ninth episode of the sixth season of the American animated television series American Dad!. It originally aired on Fox in the United States on December 13, 2009. This episode centers around Stan and Francine's life after the vast majority of the church, including Hayley and Steve, are raptured. When Stan begins to blame Francine for not getting into heaven, Francine ends their relationship and befriends a man whom she later finds out to be Jesus. Francine becomes his bride, leaving Stan behind to participate in the armageddon.

This episode was written by Chris and Matt McKenna and directed by Joe Daniello. It is the third American Dad! Christmas special, following "The Best Christmas Story Never Told" and "The Most Adequate Christmas Ever". It received acclaim upon its airing from television critics, with many going on to call it one of the best episodes of the series. This episode was watched by 6.2 million homes during its initial airing, and it acquired a 3.1 rating in the 18-49 demographic. Paget Brewster returns to reprise her role of Michelle in the episode. Andy Samberg guest stars as both "Ricky the Raptor" of the "Christian Kids" video, and as the Anti-Christ in the episode. Other guest stars were Mike Barker, Will Forte, Skyler Gisondo, Tom Kenny, Matt McKenna, Murray Miller, Martin Mull, and Don Tai Theerathada.

== Plot ==
Stan cannot find his family a good seat for a standing-room only Christmas Day church service. To calm Stan, Francine takes him to have sex with her in the janitor's closet. When they come out, everybody is gone, with their clothes left behind, except Father Donovan and the slow janitor. Exiting the church, Stan discovers that they are among those left on Earth during the Rapture. When it appears the second coming of Jesus Christ has begun, Stan blames Francine for tempting him into having sex in the janitor's closet. Francine, upset that Stan cares more about ascending into Heaven than being with her, dumps him, and Stan soon finds out Jesus is actually an imposter. Francine soon meets the real Jesus at a diner and becomes his girlfriend.

Seven years pass; the war between Jesus and the Anti-Christ reduces the world to a post-apocalyptic wasteland, with the human race on the brink of extinction. The survivors have degenerated into savage bikers, militiamen, and prostitutes. Jesus travels by motorcycle to the war-torn city of Denver, Colorado and meets with Stan, who has lost sight in one eye and replaced one hand with a blade and blames Jesus for stealing Francine. Jesus convinces him to help rescue Francine, who has been captured by the Anti-Christ. Stan agrees to do so on the condition that Jesus send him to Heaven afterward. They meet up with Roger, who has been trying to repair his spaceship in order to return to his home planet. They get to the United Nations Building, where they find Francine bound in an upside-down manger.

Stan and Jesus meet with the Anti-Christ, a self-proclaimed supervillain claiming to be the opposite of Jesus. After a drawn-out battle, Jesus jumps onto Anti's back and breaks his neck. Anti survives and attempts to shoot Jesus, but Stan takes the bullet for him, giving Jesus enough time to throw a cross-shaped shuriken into the Anti-Christ's head, killing him. When Francine tears Stan's shirt away to look at the wound, she sees that he has kept their wedding rings. Stan activates a bomb to destroy the lair and end the war, asking Francine to leave lest the explosion kill her. Stan dies in the blast and is sent to heaven. When Michelle guides him to his own "personalized heaven", Stan enters his home just as it was at the beginning of the episode, the only difference being Klaus' dead fish body mounted on a plaque.

== Production ==
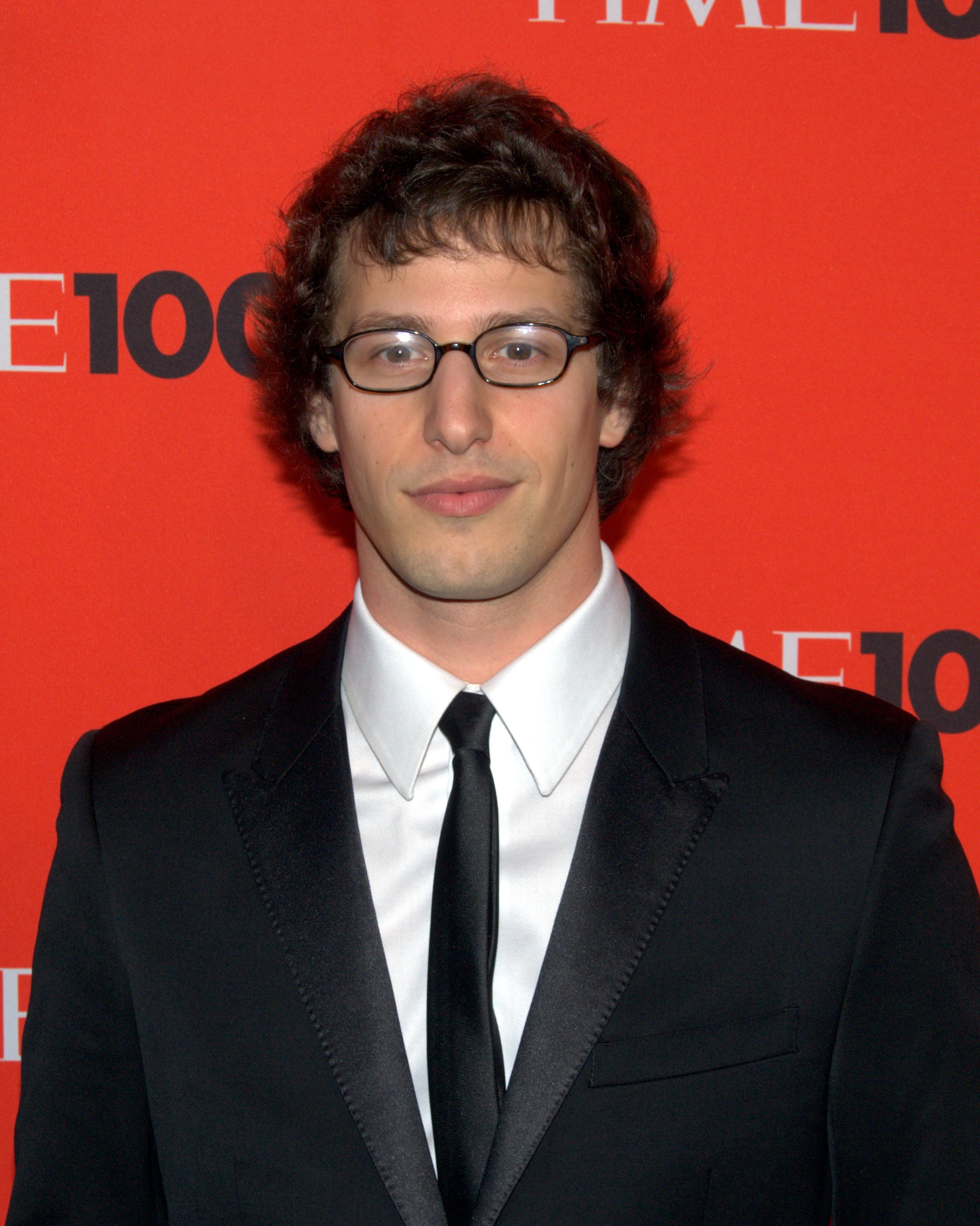
Andy Samberg made a guest appearance on the episode, providing the voices of Ricky the Raptor and the Anti-Christ.

"Rapture's Delight" was directed by series regular Joe Daniello, in his first episode of the season. This would be the first episode that he would direct since the season five episode "Delorean Story-an". It was written by series regulars Chris and Matt McKenna, their first script for the show since the previous season's "Bar Mitzvah Hustle". Seth MacFarlane, the creator and executive producer of American Dad!, as well as its sister shows Family Guy and The Cleveland Show, served as the executive producer for the episode, along with series veterans Mike Barker, Rick Wiener, Matt Weitzman, and Kenny Schwartz. Diana Retchey was the animation producer for the episode, in her ninth episode of the season. Amanda Bell served as the production manager, and this episode would be Bell's seventh episode of the season where she served as the production manager.

== Reception ==
"Rapture's Delight" was broadcast on December 13, 2009 as part of the animated television block on Fox. It was preceded by The Simpsons, and its sister shows The Cleveland Show and Family Guy. It was watched by 6.2 million homes during its initial airing, according to the Nielsen ratings, despite airing simultaneously with Sunday Night Football on NBC, Extreme Makeover: Home Edition on ABC, and Cold Case on CBS. The episode garnered a 3.1 rating in the 18-49 demographic, slightly edging out over The Cleveland Show, but having a slight lower rating that The Simpsons and lower than Family Guy by a considerable margin. The episode's total viewership and ratings decreased slightly from the previous episode, "G-String Circus", which was watched by 6.4 million homes during its original airing and received a 3.3 rating in the 18-49 demographic.

"Rapture's Delight" was met with acclaim from many television critics upon its initial airing. Emily VanDerWerff of The A.V. Club gave it a very positive review, calling it one of the best episodes of the series. She praised how the episode began in a grounded manner and became more surreal as it went on, and gave it an "A" grade, the highest grade of the night, beating out The Simpsons episode "O Brother, Where Bart Thou?", The Cleveland Show episode "A Cleveland Brown Christmas", and Family Guy episode "Business Guy". Jason Hughes of TV Squad gave the episode a very positive review, writing "American Dad was always the one that stayed with the characters and avoided trips into fantasy. Wacky asides and over-the-top shenanigans are a staple of Family Guy and have proven a smaller, but still important, part of The Cleveland Show. So I was left with my jaw hanging open when the rapture kicked in and people started flying off to heaven." He also laughed at Roger's interpretation of Christianity, finding it to be in-character for an extraterrestrial.
