= Kondō =

Kondō, Kondo or Kondou (written: 近藤, lit. "near, close to wisteria") is a surname most prominent in Japanese culture, although it also occurs in other countries. Notable people with the surname include:

- Ako Kondo (近藤 亜香; born 1991), Japanese ballet dancer
- Akihiko Kondo (近藤顕彦; born 1983), Japanese man known for marrying a fictional character
- Geoffrey Kondo (born 2002), French footballer
- Hayato Kondo (近藤隼斗; born 2001), Japanese judoka
- Dorinne K. Kondo, anthropologist
- Kondō Isami (近藤 勇; 1834–1868), chief of the Shinsengumi
- Jun Kondo (近藤 淳; 1930–2022), physicist, researcher of the Kondo effect
- Katsuya Kondō (近藤 勝也; born 1963), manga artist, character designer, animator and animation director
- Koji Kondo (近藤 浩治; born 1961), Japanese composer and musician
- Mai Kondo (近藤 真衣; born 1992), Japanese ice hockey player
- Mamadou Kondo, Malian footballer
- Marie Kondo (born 1984), organizing consultant and author
- Masaharu Kondo (近藤 正春; born 1956), Japanese bureaucrat
- Masahiko Kondō (近藤 真彦; born 1964), or Matchy, Japanese singer, lyricist and actor
- Masakazu Kondō (近藤 正和; born 1971), professional shogi player
- Mine Kondō (近藤ミネ, 1910–2025), Japanese supercentenarian
- Mitsuki Kondo (近藤美月; born 2004), Japanese judoka
- Natsue Kondo (近藤 奈津枝; born 1966), Japan Maritime Self-Defense Force admiral
- Nobutake Kondō (近藤 信竹; 1886–1953), Imperial Japanese Navy admiral
- Seiya Kondō (近藤 誠也; born 1996), professional shogi player
- Shuji Kondo (近藤 修司; born 1978), professional wrestler
- Syuri Kondo (近藤 朱里; born 1989), professional wrestler and shoot boxer
- Takayo Kondo (近藤 高代; born 1975), Japanese pole vaulter
- Tomio Kondō (近藤 福雄; 1900–1957), photographer of Sado island
- Tomoko Kondo (近藤 智子; born 1966), a member of the 1980s J-Pop duo BaBe
- Toshinori Kondo (近藤 等則; 1948–2020), Japanese trumpet player
- Tsuruyo Kondo (近藤 鶴代; 1901–1970), Japanese politician
- Yoshifumi Kondō (近藤 喜文; 1950–1998), animator and film director
- Yuki Kondo (近藤 有己; born 1975), mixed martial arts fighter
- Yoshio Kondo (1910–1990), biologist and malacologist
- Yukari Kondo (近藤ゆかり; born 1967), Japanese curler
- Armin Kondo (近藤 アルミン; born 2000), samurai warrior
