= Louis Kondos =

Greek soap opera actor

- Born: Louis Kondos; 13 February 1946 (age 80); Athens, Greece
- Partner: Diane Saluwas (1975 - present)

Louis Kondos (born 13 February 1946 in Athens), is a Greek soap opera actor. He appeared on Kalimera Zoi on the ANT1 network from 1994 until the show's end in 2006.
