= Natsue Kondo =

Japanese naval officer (born 1966)

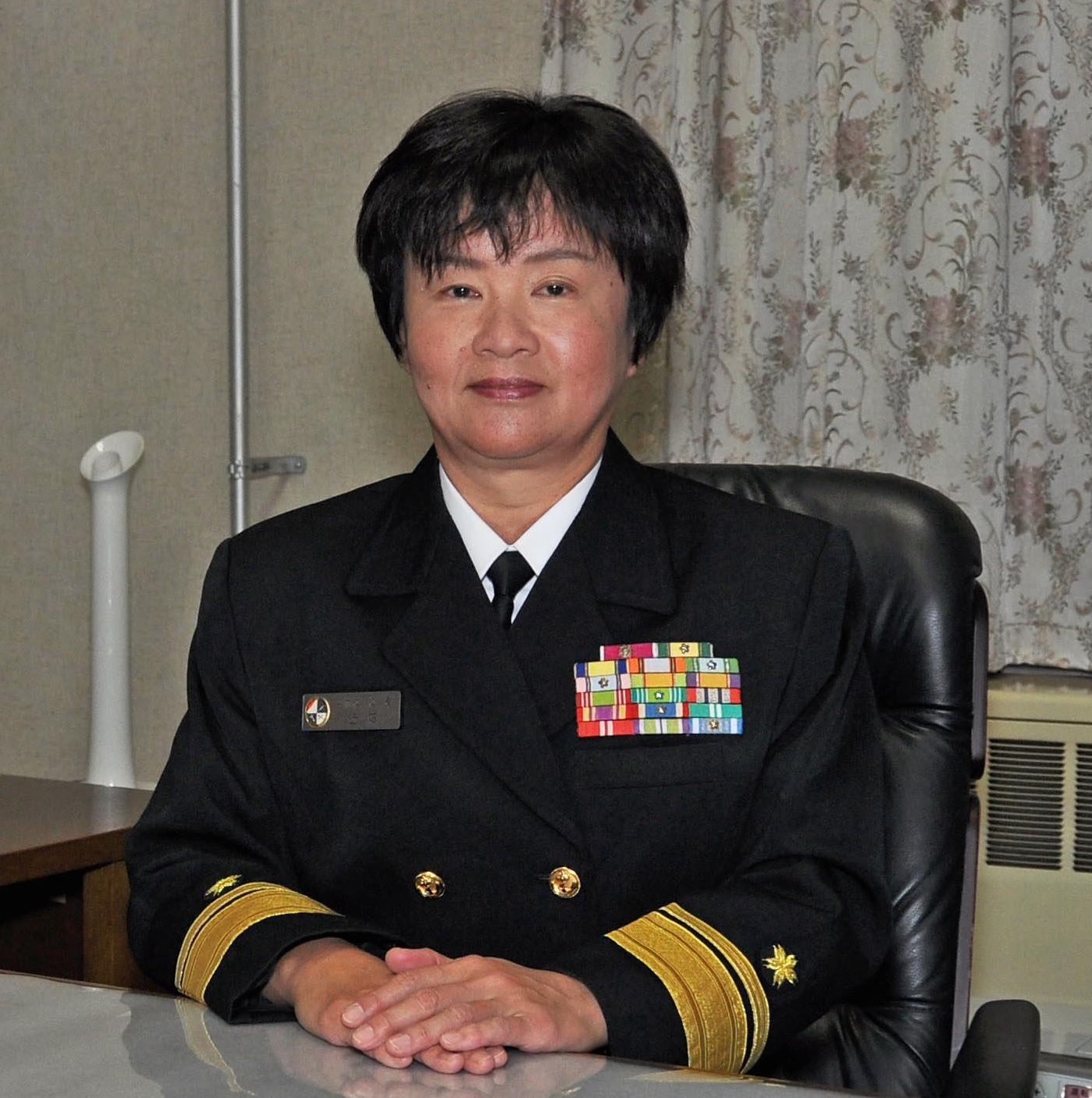
- Kondo in 2021
- Born: 13 January 1966 (age 60); Yamaguchi, Japan
- Military career
- Allegiance: Japan
- Branch: Japan Maritime Self-Defense Force
- Rank: Vice Admiral

Vice Admiral Natsue Kondo (近藤 奈津枝, Kondō Natsue; born 13 January 1966) is a Japanese naval officer.

== Biography ==
Kondo was born on 13 January 1966 and joined the Japan Maritime Self-Defense Force (JMSDF) in 1989 after graduating from Yamaguchi University. In April 2011 she became chief of administration at the JMSDF's ship supply depot. In August 2012 she became head of the paymaster section at the Maritime Staff Office (MSO) and in April of the following year became vice head of finance at the MSO. From December 2013 Kondo served as director of accounts at the JMSDF's Sasebo, Nagasaki district headquarters. She was director of welfare at the MSO from September 2015.

In December 2016 she was promoted to the rank of rear admiral and appointed director-general of logistics in the office of the Chief of Staff, Joint Staff of the Japan Self-Defense Forces.

In December 2023 she was promoted to the rank of vice admiral and appointed as commander of the Ominato District, becoming the first female vice admiral in the JMSDF.
