= Patlabor EZY =

Japanese mecha anime series

- Poster for Patlabor EZY

機動警察パトレイバー EZY (Kidō Keisatsu Patlabor EZY)
- Genre: Action comedy; Mecha; Science fiction
- Original video animation
- Directed by: Yutaka Izubuchi
- Produced by: Tarō Maki
- Written by: Kazunori Ito
- Music by: Kenji Kawai
- Studio: J.C.Staff
- Released: May 15, 2026 – present
- Episodes: 8
- icon

Patlabor EZY (Japanese: 機動警察パトレイバー EZY, Hepburn: Kidō Keisatsu Patlabor EZY; Also titled as Headgear Presents: Patlabor EZY) is a Japanese mecha anime series produced by J.C.Staff and directed by Yutaka Izubuchi, with scripts and series composition by Kazunori Itō. Part of the Patlabor franchise, it continues the continuity established by the franchise's television anime.

Set in 2033 Japan, the series follows a new generation of officers in the Tokyo Metropolitan Police Department's Special Vehicle Section 2 dealing with Labor crimes and accidents, even as Labors are becoming obsolete from the increase in AI-driven automation. The series consists of eight episodes released in Japan as three theatrical installments by Shochiku & Bandai Namco Filmworks and on home video via Emotion from 2026–2027.

== Plot ==
In 2033, it has been decades since the rise of humanoid work machines known as Labors and the creation of the Tokyo Metropolitan Police Department's Special Vehicle Section 2 (SV2). Over the last few decades, Japan has faced a shrinking workforce and rapid AI-driven automation: even as they became integrated in to the country's daily infrastructure, the once-advanced piloted Labors were increasingly replaced by autonomous robots.

Labor-related crimes and accidents continue to require police invention from the new SV2 — but also manifest in distinctly modern ways, such as going viral on social media or being aggravated by shoddy AI. The AV98Plus's (a tuned-up version of the old AV-98 Ingram) new pilot Towa Kuga and her backup Kippei Atori are the protagonists of EZY, but, like the original Patlabor series, all of the SV2 play roles.

== Characters ==
Towa Kuga (久我十和, Kuga Towa)
Voiced by: Sumire Uesaka
The pilot of Ingram-01, her strong sense of justice sometimes causes her to act recklessly.
Kippei Atori (天鳥桔平, Atori Kippei)
Voiced by: Kikunosuke Toya
The commander of Ingram-01, he is an optimistic mecha enthusiast who supports Towa despite frequently being drawn into her recklessness.
Saki Hirata (平田紗季, Hirata Saki)
Voiced by: Ami Koshimizu
The commander of Ingram-02, she is calm and highly analytical.
Akihiko Hazama (間 昭彦, Hazama Akihiko)
Voiced by: Chikahiro Kobayashi
The pilot of Ingram-02, he is highly distrustful of AI.
Yūta Yanai (柳井雄太, Yanai Yūta)
Voiced by: Setsuji Satō
The carrier driver for Ingram-01, he is a physically strong and skilled in cooking, only joining the police force after his family's restaurant closed.
Hachikuma Yuzuki (柚木八久万, Yuzuki Hachikuma)
Voiced by: Yume Matsumura
The carrier driver for Ingram-02, she is a tall but clumsy officer who hopes to have a cat one day.
Kimika Saeki (佐伯貴美香, Saeki Kimika)
Voiced by: Megumi Hayashibara
The captain of SV2, she is a calm and capable leader who understands the strengths of her subordinates.

== Development ==
After Mamoru Oshii's live-action The Next Generation: Patlabor aired in 2014–2015, several of Headgear's other members such as Itō, Izubuchi, and Yūki reunited to create a new animated Patlabor series as a response. "We wanted to do it properly as an anime again," Izubuchi said. The short film Patlabor Reboot, which aired at Animator Expo, was seen as testing the waters for this new animated series. Patlabor EZY was formally announced at Annecy International Animated Film Festival in June 2017, and a two-minute pilot debuted in 2022 at special screenings and before the anniversary screenings of Patlabor the Movie in Japan.

The title "EZY" comes from the metric prefix initials of "Exa", "Zetta", and "Yotta"; the large scale these prefixes represent are meant to embody the idea of a future that hasn't yet arrived for Patlabor. Similarly, the production team also set about creating new characters for SV2 rather than bringing back the original cast so that the new series wouldn't feel "set in 1998 all over again."

As part of EZY's promotional events, the robotics company MOVeLOT developed a full-scale Ingram 98 Plus, which opened to the public in 2024 (although the model is only from the torso up—it has no legs). The model Ingram is large enough to allow a pilot to sit in the cockpit, and its arms and hands can be manipulated via gloves with attached Wi-Fi sensors.

The first part ('File 01') was released in theaters on May 15, 2026 and on home media the following week on May 22; the second part ('File 02') was released theatrically on August 14 and on home media on August 21. The third and final part ('File 03') is scheduled for a March 2027 release. Studio J.C.Staff is creating the anime, with Yutaka Izubuchi as director, Kazunori Itō as scriptwriter, Masami Yūki as character designer, Takamitsu Satou as animation director, Akemi Takada as costume designer, and Kenji Kawai as composer. The theme song "Reimei Compass", is performed by Mori Calliope.

== Media ==
Patlabor EZY consists of eight standalone episodes released as three theatrical films, with the first film comprising the first three episodes, the second film comprising the following three episodes, and the third and final film comprising the final two episodes. The first six episodes are in an anthology format (split between the File 01 and File 02 films) while the last two episodes (File 03) tell a continuous story.

== Reception ==
Richard Eisenbeis from Anime News Network praised File 1 for its grounded portrayal of mecha as ordinary industrial machinery, its workplace comedy, and its effective blend of animation styles. They also praised the music from Mori Calliope, but criticized the characters as somewhat one-dimensional. Matt Schley of The Japan Times wrote that File 1 was a fitting continuance for fans of the original Patlabor series, and that Episode 2 ("Delusions in Leisure") especially was "classic Patlabor at its best".

File 1, which showed at 70 theaters throughout Japan, debuted at eighth place in the Japanese box office during its opening weekend, and in total made a box office gross of over ¥200 million.

== See also ==
- Patlabor: The TV Series
- Patlabor: The New Files
- The Next Generation: Patlabor
