= Miina Tominaga =

Japanese actress (born 1966)

- 冨永 みーな
- Born: Yoshiko Tominaga (富永 美子); April 3, 1966 (age 60); Nishi-ku, Hiroshima, Japan
- Occupations: Actress; voice actress; singer
- Years active: 1971–present
- Agent: Haikyō
- Spouse: Shōichirō Masumoto (m. 2001)
- Children: 2

Yoshiko Tominaga (富永 美子, Tominaga Yoshiko; born April 3, 1966), better known by her stage name Miina Tominaga (冨永 みーな, Tominaga Mīna), is a Japanese actress, voice actress and singer from Nishi-ku, Hiroshima. She is currently affiliated with Haikyō.

Tominaga is best known for her roles in Sazae-san as Katsuo Isono, Persia, the Magic Fairy as Persia Hayami, Let's Go! Anpanman as Rollpanna and Dokin-chan, Patlabor as Noa Izumi, Maison Ikkoku as Kozue Nanao, Rurouni Kenshin as Myōjin Yahiko, Jigoku Sensei Nūbē as Miki Hosokawa, DNA² as Karin Aoi and Bikkuriman 2000 as Takeru.

== Relationships ==
She married voice actor Kazuki Yao on June 29, 1990, though they later divorced. In August 2001 she married Shōichirō Masumoto, a star from the agency Yoshimoto Kogyo, and gave birth to a daughter in January 2002.

== Filmography ==
=== Television animation ===
- Tokimeki Tonight (1982) (Yōko Kamiya)
- Persia, the Magic Fairy (1984) (Persia Hayami)
- Maison Ikkoku (1986) (Kozue Nanao)
- Pastel Yumi, the Magic Idol (1986) (Kakimaru)
- Hokuto no Ken 2 (1987) (Lin)
- City Hunter (1987) (Kasumi Asou)
- Let's Go! Anpanman (1988) (Rollpanna, Dokin-chan (second voice), Akugidori (second voice), Shirokabu-kun, Tsumire-chan)
- City Hunter 2 (1989) (Kasumi Asou)
- Mobile Police Patlabor (1989) (Noa Izumi)
- City Hunter 3 (1989–90) (Kasumi Asou)
- Anime Himitsu no Hanazono (1991–92) (Mary Lennox)
- Dragon Quest: Dai no Daibōken (1991) (Maam)
- DNA² Dokokade Nakushita Aitsuno Aitsu (1994) (Karin Aoi)
- Rurouni Kenshin Meiji Kenkaku Romantan (1996) (Myōjin Yahiko)
- Hell Teacher Nūbē (1996) (Miki Hosokawa)
- Yu-Gi-Oh! (1998) (Ailean Rao)
- Fruits Basket (2001) (Ritsu Sōma)
- Akazukin Chacha (1994) (Dorothy, Elizabeth, Teacher Oyuki, Mary)
- Nurse Angel Ririka SOS (1995) (Yuko Uzaki)
- Smile PreCure! (2012) (Majorina)
- Detective Conan (2025) (Amanda Hughes)

Unknown date

- Araiguma Rascal (Alice Stevenson)
- Astro Boy (Bea-chan)
- Bikkuriman 2000 (Takeru)
- Chikkun Takkun (Miko Minamida)
- D.Gray-man (Fo)
- Don Don Domel and Ron (Cherry)
- Ginga Hyōryū Vifam (Clare Barbland)
- Hunter × Hunter (2011) (Melody)
- Hiroshi-Hiro-kun (Utako)
- Maya the Honey Bee
- Ojarumaru (Den-San)
- Paranoia Agent (Kamome)
- Porphy no Nagai Tabi (Mariannu)
- Rascal the Raccoon (Alice Stevenson)
- Sazae-san (Hayakawa-san (second voice), Ukie Isazaka (second voice), Katsuo Isono (third voice))
- Shura no Toki - Age of Chaos (Oryō)
- Suzuka (Suzune Asahina)
- Touch (Kaori Shinozuka (first series), Yuka Nitta (second series))
- Undersea Super Train: Marine Express (Pinoko)

=== OVA ===
- Birth (1984) (Rasa)
- Suashi no Houkago (1985) (Miiko, Nami, and Ms. Shizuka, insert song)
- Kaminari no Densetsu Shuu: Ganbare! Yamamura Shuiichi (1986) (Hikaru Kamiya)
- Karuizawa Syndrome (xxxx) (Eri Tsunoda)
- Kyūkyoku Chōjin R (1991) (Shīko Horikawa)
- Maps (1994) (Ripuradō Gaisu)
- Megazone 23 (1985) (Tomomi Murashita)
- Yōma (1989) (Aya #2)

=== Theatrical animation ===
- The Star of Cottonland (xxxx) (Chibi-neko)
- Tatsu no Kotarō (xxxx) (Aya)
- Nausicaä of the Valley of the Wind (1984) (Lastelle)
- Patlabor: The Movie (1989) (Noa Izumi)
- Patlabor: The Movie 2 (1993) (Noa Izumi)
- WXIII: Patlabor the Movie 3 (2002) (Noa Izumi)
- Detective Conan: Zero the Enforcer (2018) (Sayoko Iwai)
- Crayon Shin-chan: Crash! Graffiti Kingdom and Almost Four Heroes (2020) (Brief)

=== Video games ===
- Snatcher (1992) (Mika Slayton, Katherine Gibson)
- Idol Janshi Suchie-Pai series (1994–1998) (Rumi Sasaki)
- Imagination Science World Gulliver Boy (1995) (Phoebe)
- Last Bronx (1996) (Lisa Kusanami)
- Magical Drop III (1997) (Fortune, Judgment, Temperance)
- Metal Slug (1998) (Sophia, Ending song)
- The King of Fighters 2001 (2001) (Ángel)
- Puyo Puyo Tetris (2014) (O)
- Dragon Quest XI: Echoes of an Elusive Age (2019) (The Seer, Puff-Puff Girl)
- Puyo Puyo Tetris 2 (2020) (O)

Unknown date

- Atelier Elie ~The Alchemist of Salburg 2~ (xxxx) (Romauge Bremer)
- Winning Post 3 (xxxx) (Mii Tomino)

=== Dubbing roles ===
==== Live-action ====
- The Adventures of the Wilderness Family (1979 TV Asahi edition) – Jenny Robinson (Hollye Holmes)
- Ally McBeal – Hope Mercey (Alicia Witt)
- Columbo – Audrey (Dawn Frame)
- Commando (1987 TBS edition) – Jenny Matrix (Alyssa Milano)
- CSI: Miami – Ivonne Fernandez (Melonie Diaz)
- Dae Jang Geum – Jang-deok (Kim Yeo-jin)
- The Exorcist (1980 TBS edition) – Regan MacNeil (Linda Blair)
- For Love or Money – Andy Hart (Gabrielle Anwar)
- The Goodbye Girl (1982 TBS edition) – Lucy McFadden (Quinn Cummings)
- Law & Order: Criminal Intent – Trudy Pomeranski (J. Smith-Cameron)
- Little House on the Prairie – Carrie Ingalls (Lindsay and Sidney Greenbush)
- Paper Moon (1982 TV Asahi and 1984 TBS editions) – Addie Loggins (Tatum O'Neal)
- The Pianist – Halina Szpilman (Jessica Kate Meyer)
- Riding in Cars with Boys – Fay Forrester (Brittany Murphy)
- Taxi Driver (1981 TBS edition) – Iris (Jodie Foster)

==== Animation ====
- The Black Cauldron (Princess Eilonwy)
- Chip 'n Dale Rescue Rangers (Gadget Hackwrench)
- Tiny Toon Adventures (Babs Bunny)
- Teenage Mutant Ninja Turtles (BS2 dub) (April O'Neil)

== Live-action roles ==
- Ultraman Leo (1974–1975) (Ueda Kaoru)
- Ultraman R/B (2018) (Booska (ep. 17))
- Ultraman New Generation Chronicle (2019) (Booska)

== Awards ==
Year	Award	Category	Result
2018	12th Seiyu Awards	Kazue Takahashi Memorial Award	Won
