= Daisuke Gōri =

Japanese actor and narrator (1952–2010)

- 郷里 大輔
- Born: Yoshio Nagahori; February 8, 1952; Kōtō, Tokyo, Japan
- Died: January 17, 2010 (aged 57); Nakano, Tokyo, Japan
- Occupations: Actor; voice actor; narrator
- Years active: 1973–2010
- Agent: Aoni Production

Daisuke Gōri (郷里 大輔, Gōri Daisuke; February 8, 1952 – January 17, 2010) was a Japanese actor, voice actor and narrator from Kōtō, Tokyo. Throughout his life, he was attached to TV Talent Center Tokyo, Yoshizawa Theatre School and then Mausu Promotion; he was attached to Aoni Production at the time of his death. His real name, as well as his former stage name, was Yoshio Nagahori (長堀 芳夫, Nagahori Yoshio). He was best known for his roles in the Dragon Ball series as Mister Satan and numerous other characters, the Gundam series as Dozle Zabi and Bask Om, Ninja Scroll as Gemma Himuro, Kinnikuman as Robin Mask, Patlabor as Hiromi Yamazaki, Star Fox as General Pepper, Andross, and Pigma Dengar, Dead or Alive as Bass Armstrong, Tekken as Heihachi Mishima, and Soulcalibur as Edge Master – as well for his distinctive deep, booming voice.

== Death ==
According to fellow voice actors, Gōri was diagnosed with diabetes mellitus a few years prior to his death and his vision was affected by retinal detachment as a result of the disease. He complained to coworkers, "I cannot read the script. I cannot work as I want." (「台本が読めない。思うように仕事ができない。」) During an Anpanman recording session in late 2009, a depressed-sounding Gōri told his close friend and voice actor Kazuhiko Inoue, "I've grown old" (「もう年だよ」).

On January 17, 2010, at approximately 3:00 P.M., Gōri was found lying on his stomach with blood dripping from his wrists in the middle of a street in Nakano, Tokyo by a passerby, who then notified the police. Authorities from the Tokyo Metropolitan Police Department's Nakano station discovered a utility knife under his body as well as a suicide note (with the words "I'm sorry" (ごめんね) and "Thank you" (ありがとう) scrawled on it) addressed to his family in his pants pocket. Gōri's death was then ruled a suicide; he was three weeks short of his 58th birthday. His ongoing roles were replaced primarily by Ryūzaburō Ōtomo and the late Unshō Ishizuka.

== Filmography ==
=== Television animation ===
1973

- Cutie Honey (Narrator)

1979

- Mobile Suit Gundam (Dozle Zabi)
- Entaku no Kishi Monogatari: Moero Arthur (Percival)

1980

- Ashita no Joe 2 (Kichi Chinpira)
- Moeru Arthur: Hakuba no Ōji (Subordinate)
- Nils no Fushigi na Tabi (Gachō #B)
- Mighty Atom (Observation Robot (episode 34), Operation Robot (ep 39))
- Time Patrol tai Otasukeman (Pupil A)

1981

- Ginga Senpū Braiger (Garicone Commanding Officer)
- Dash Kappei (Ushiyama)
- Gold Lightan (Sayokka)
- Sengoku Majin GōShōgun (Yatter Ra Kerunagūru)

1982

- Ginga Reppū Baxinger (Igo Mokkosu)
- Gyakuten! Ippatsuman (Koizō Higeno, Yakan)
- Minami no Niji no Lucy (Heracles, Max)
- Sasuga no Sarutobi (Executive #B)
- Tokimeki Tonight (Crépemonger, Henchman)

1983

- A Wind Named Amnesia (Little John)
- Kikō Sōseiki MOSPEADA (Platoon Chief)
- Kinnikuman (Robin Mask, Zangyaku-seijin, Black Hole (episodes 48-52), Daimaō Satan, Ashuraman, Ashuraman's Father, Dirty Baron, Additional Voices)

1984

- Hokuto no Ken (Diamond (episode 3), Southern Cross executive (episode 21), Gertz (episode 33), Goerz (episode 33), Uighur the Warden (episodes 37-42), Cassandra prisoner (episode 43), Bull (episode 59), Daruka (episode 89)), Buzz Harn (114-116), Akashachi (123-138)
- Kinnikuman: Great Riot! Seigi Chōjin (Robin Mask, Black Sumo)
- Kinnikuman: Stolen Championship Belt (Robin Mask)
- Super Dimension Cavalry Southern Cross (Claude Leon)

1985

- Aoki Senshi SPT Layzner (Major Kakusu Dani)
- Kinnikuman: Counterattack! The Underground Space Chōjins (Robin Mask, New Ashuraman)
- Kinnikuman: Hour of Triumph! Seigi Chōjin (Robin Mask)
- Kinnikuman: Seigi Chōjin vs. Kodai Chōjin (Robin Mask)
- Mobile Suit Zeta Gundam (Bask Om)
- Shōjō no Sarah (James)
- Doraemon (Captain)

1986

- Dragon Ball: Curse of the Blood Rubies (Umigame)
- Dragon Ball (Umigame, Gyū-Maō, Colonel Yellow, Cymbal, Drum, Yaochun, Inoshikachō, Gora, Spectator, Additional Voices)
- Ginga: Nagareboshi Gin (Moss the English Mastiff)
- Kinnikuman: Crisis in New York! (Robin Mask)
- Kinnikuman: Seigi Chōjin vs. Senshi Chōjin (Robin Mask, Big Shinjo)
- Kō Q Chōji Ikkiman (Samson)
- Project A-ko (Mari)
- Saint Seiya (Heracles Seiza no Algethi)

1987

- Dragon Ball: Sleeping Princess in Devil's Castle (Umigame, Ghastel)
- Doraemon (Gian's Father)

1988

- City Hunter 2 (Thunder King (ep 25), Gin no Asa (episodes 45 and 47))
- Sakigake!! Otokojuku (Heihachi Edajima, Narrator)
- Topo Gigio (Megaro)
- Transformers: Super-God Masterforce (Dauros, Additional Voices)

1989

- Dragon Ball Z (Umigame, Gyū-Maō, King Enma, Mister Satan, King Cold, Vinegar, Porunga, Additional Voices)
- Dragon Quest (Dodonga)
- Jungle Book Shōnen Mowgli (Hathi)
- Urotsukidoji (Chojin, Great Elder, Niki's Father)
- Kidō Keisatsu Patlabor (Hiromi Yamazaki)
- Peter Pan no Bōken (Bill)
- Transformers: Victory (Goryu, Dinoking)

1990

- Brave Exkaiser (Horn Geist)

1991

- The Brave Fighter of Sun Fighbird (Draias/Organic Draias)

1992

- Crayon Shin-chan (Chief, Dondon, Shop Employee)
- Super Bikkuriman (Super Devil, Devil Zeus)

1993

- Ninja Scroll (Himuro Gemma)

1995

- Slayers (Ruby Eye Shabranigdo)

1996

- Dragon Ball GT (Umigame, Mister Satan, King Enma, Black Smoke Dragon, Shenron)
- GeGeGe no Kitarō (Shu no Bon, Kaminari, Yunyū Michi, Jami (ep 54), Yokoshima Miiru)
- Kaitō Saint Tail (Kuroda (episode 22))
- Detective Conan (Jūsan Tonoyama)
- Urotsukidoji IV: Inferno Road (Demon Beast)

1997

- Chūka Ichiban! (Chief Ramen)

1998

- Cowboy Bebop (Fatty River)
- Trigun (Descartes)

1999

- Alexander Senki (Antigonus)
- Great Teacher Onizuka (Kantoku Hakutaku)
- Master Keaton (Daves)
- Seihō Tenshi Angel Links (Exiade Leego)

2000

- Hidamari no Ki (Seisai Taki)
- Yu-Gi-Oh! Duel Monsters (Guard A (episode 8))

2001

- Final Fantasy: Unlimited (Fungus)
- One Piece (Dorry)
- One Piece: The Clockwork Island Adventure (Mayor)
- Pokémon (Mikio)
- Project ARMS (Gashure)

2002

- Ghost in the Shell: Stand Alone Complex (Marco Amoretti)
- Ō Dorobō Jing (Vodka)
- Kinnikuman Nisei (Robin Mask (episodes 2–4))
- One Piece: Chopper's Kingdom on the Island of Strange Animals (General Hotdog)

2003

- Air Master (Nagato)
- Full Metal Panic? Fumoffu (Yasa Gōda)
- Fullmetal Alchemist (Dominic LeCoulte)
- Inuyasha (Kyōkotsu)
- One Piece (Rockstar)
- One Piece The Movie: Dead End no Bōken (Bookie, Bobby)

2004

- Black Jack (Mister Muramasa)
- Mōsōdai Rinin (Junji Handa)
- Hi no Tori (Ibukimaru)
- Kaiketsu Zorori (Prince Bururu)
- Samurai Champloo (Matsunosuke Shibui)
- Yu-Gi-Oh! Duel Monsters GX (Kumazō Maeda)

2005

- Gallery Fake (Floyd Sanders)
- Majime ni Fumajime Kaiketsu Zorori (Bururu)
- Yakitate!! Japan (Ortega (episode 29))
- Yuki no Joō: The Snow Queen (Bandit Leader)

2006

- Angel Heart (Max)
- Gintama (Inoue the Yakuza Boss)
- Happy Lucky Bikkuriman (Kibidango Bathhouse Assistant, Emperor Momotarō, Oni Gashi Ma)
- Inukami! (Great Fox Spirit (Seal))
- Kemonozume (Bon (Jōji Ōba))
- Kinnikuman II: Ultimate Muscle 2 (Robin Mask (episode 13))
- Kishin Hōkō Demonbane (Caligula)
- MÄR (Kōga)
- Ouran High School Host Club (Mitsukuni's Father)
- Shijō Saikyō no Deshi Kenichi (Genji Shirahama)
- Tokyo Tribe 2 (Bubba)

2007

- Bleach (Dondochakka Bilstin)
- Blue Dragon (Dark Dragon)
- Dennō Coil (Daichi's father)
- Fist of the North Star - Legend of Raoh: Chapter of Fierce Fight (Fudo)
- GeGeGe no Kitarō (King Enma)
- Master of Epic: The Animation Age (Male Pandemos)
- Kekkaishi (Rō Ōgiichi)
- Sgt. Frog (Eddy Honda)
- Soreike! Anpanman (Kazekonkon)

2008

- Doraemon (Gebaruto)

2009

- Dragon Ball Kai (Gyū-Maō, King Enma, Porunga)
- Kiddy Girl-and (Bajil)
- One Piece (Jinbe, ep. 430-432)
- Slayers Evolution-R (Shabranigdo)
- Tales of Vesperia: The First Strike - Merzhom Keida
- Tomica Hero Rescue Fire (Donkaen)

2022

- Bleach: Thousand-Years Blood War (Dondochakka Bilstin; archived audio)

=== OVA ===
- Guyver (1989) (Derzerb)
- Ys (1989) (Norton)
- Ninja Ryūkenden (1991) (Jeffrey Hammond)
- Mobile Suit Gundam 0083: Stardust Memory (1991) (Bask Om)
- Ushio and Tora (1992) (Asako's father)
- Gunsmith Cats (1995) (Jonathan Washington)
- Tekken: The Motion Picture (1997) (Heihachi Mishima)
- Transformers: Zone (1997) (Violenjiger, Trypticon)
- Zaion: I Wish You Were Here (2001) (Prof. Domeki)
- Dragon Ball: Yo! Son Goku and His Friends Return!! (2008) (Mister Satan, Umigame, Gyū-Maō)

=== Theatrical animation ===
- Fist of the North Star (1986) (Uighur)
- Dragon Ball: Mystical Adventure (1988) (Umigame)
- Dragon Ball Z: Dead Zone (1989) (Gyū-Maō)
- Patlabor: The Movie (1989) (Hiromi Yamazaki)
- Dragon Ball Z: The World's Strongest (1990) (Misokattsun, Umigame)
- Dragon Ball Z: Lord Slug (1991) (Dorodabo)
- Dragon Ball Z: The History of Trunks (1993) (Gyū-Maō, Umigame)
- Dragon Ball Z: Bojack Unbound (1993) (Mister Satan)
- Patlabor 2: The Movie (1993) (Hiromi Yamazaki)
- Dragon Ball Z: Bio-Broly (1994) (Mister Satan)
- Street Fighter II: The Animated Movie (1994) (E. Honda)
- Dragon Ball Z: Fusion Reborn (1995)(Mister Satan)
- Dragon Ball: The Path to Power (1996) (Umigame)
- Sakura Wars: The Movie (2001) (Yokihiko Ōta)
- WXIII: Patlabor the Movie 3 (2002) (Hiromi Yamazaki)
- Street Fighter Alpha: Generations (2005) (Akuma)
- Redline (2010) (Gori-Rider) (Posthumous release)

=== Video games ===
Year	Title	Role	Notes	Source
1994	Kunio's Oden	Riki Samejima, Nishimura		
1995	Astal	Jerado		
1995	Double Dragon (Neo-Geo)	Abobo, Burnov		
1996	Super Dodge Ball	D.B. Maou		
1996	Puyo Puyo CD	Zoh Daimaou		
1996	Tobal No. 1	Ill Goga		
1996	Dead or Alive	Bass Armstrong		
1997	Tekken 3	Heihachi Mishima		
1997	Silhouette Mirage	Goliath		
1998	Sakura Wars 2: Thou Shalt Not Die	Akihiko Ota		
1998	Lunar: Eternal Blue	Black Wizard Borgan		
1998	Soulcalibur	Edge Master		
1998	Thousand Arms	Grapple		
1999	Dead or Alive 2	Bass Armstrong		
2000	Grandia II	Mareg		
2000	The Bouncer	Volt Krueger		
2000	Brave Saga 2	Satan Bardot		
2001	Tekken 4	Heihachi Mishima		
2001	Metal Gear Solid 2: Sons of Liberty	Scott Dolph		
2002	Dead or Alive 3	Bass Armstrong		
2002	Soulcalibur II	Heihachi Mishima		
2004	Samurai Warriors	Takeda Shingen		
2004	Xenosaga Episode II	Boss		
2004	Mega Man X: Command Mission	Silver Horn, Incentas		
2005	Star Fox: Assault	Pigma Dengar		
2005	Namco × Capcom	Heihachi Mishima		
2005	Dead or Alive 4	Bass Armstrong		
2006	Samurai Warriors 2	Takeda Shingen		
2006	JoJo's Bizarre Adventure: Phantom Blood	Tarkus		
2006	Metal Gear Solid: Portable Ops	Lt. Cunningham		
2007	Tekken 6	Heihachi Mishima		
2008	Ninja Gaiden II	Volf		
2009	Samurai Warriors 3	Takeda Shingen		
2010	The King of Fighters XIII	Raiden	Posthumous release	
2010	Zangeki no Reginleiv	Loki	Posthumous release	
2025	Bleach: Rebirth of Souls	Dondochakka Blistin	Posthumous release	

- Star Gladiator (1996) (Gamof Gohgry, Edward Bilstein)
- Red Earth (1996) (Leo, Kongou, Valdoll)
- Star Fox 64 (1997) (General Pepper, Andross, Pigma Dengar, various bosses)
- Tekken Tag Tournament (1999) (Heihachi Mishima)
- Tekken Advance (2001) (Heihachi Mishima)
- Pac-Man World 2 (2002) (Spooky, Ghost Tree)
- Tekken 5 (2004) (Heihachi Mishima)
- Capcom Fighting Evolution (2004) (Leo)
- Death by Degrees (2005) (Heihachi Mishima)
- Tekken 5: Dark Resurrection (2005) (Heihachi Mishima)
- Final Fantasy XII (2006) (Gilgamesh)
- JoJo's Bizarre Adventure: Phantom Blood (2006) (Tarkus)
- Tekken 7 (2017) (Heihachi Mishima) (archive voice footage)
- Ace Combat 5: The Unsung War (2004) (Colonel Orson Perrault)
- Ape Escape (series) (1999-2010) (Ukki Red)
- Baten Kaitos Origins (2006) (Wiseman)
- Daraku Tenshi – The Fallen Angels (1998) (Harry Ness)
- Dragon Ball Z: Budokai series (2002–2012) (Mister Satan)
- Dragon Ball Z: Budokai Tenkaichi (2005) (Mister Satan, Gyū-Maō)
- Dragon Ball Z: Budokai Tenkaichi 2 (2006) (Mister Satan, Gyū-Maō, Drum)
- Dragon Ball Z: Budokai Tenkaichi 3 (2007) (Mister Satan, King Cold)
- Drakengard (2003) (Manah, The Voice of God)
- Everybody's Golf 4 (2003) (Bronson)
- Genji: Dawn of the Samurai (2005) (Taira no Kiyomori)
- Garouden Breakblow: Fist or Twist (2005) (Rikiozan)
- Jak II (Baron Praxis, Mog) (2003) (Japanese dub)
- The King of Fighters XII (2009) (Raiden)
- Kessen (2000) (Shimazu Yoshihiro)
- Quiz Magic Academy (2003) (Romanov)
- Sakura Wars (1996) (Yokihiko Ōta)
- Shadow Hearts (2001) (Cardinal Albert Simon)
- Shadow Hearts: Covenant (2004) (Cardinal Albert Simon)
- Shining Tears (2004) (Lazarus)
- Tales of Rebirth (2004) (Tohma)
- Tenchu: Wrath of Heaven (2003) (Ganda)
- Time Crisis 4 (2006) (The Head of the V.S.S.E., First Lieutenant Jack Mathers)
- Wild Arms 5 (2006) (Elvis)

=== Narration ===
- Beat Takeshi no TV Tackle (TV Asahi)
- Smart Monsters (TV Asahi)

=== Tokusatsu ===
- Gekisou Sentai Carranger (1996) (Elekinta (ep 14))
- Choukou Senshi Changerion (1996) (Houjinki)
- B-Robo Kabutack (1997) (Captain Tomborg)
- Ultraman Gaia: The Battle in Hyperspace (1999) (Satan Bizoo)
- Kyuukyuu Sentai GoGoFive (1999) (Narrator)
- Ultraman Cosmos: The First Contact (2001) (Alien Baltan (Voice: Yukitoshi Hori))
- Hyakujuu Sentai Gaoranger (2002) (Ultimate Org Senki (eps. 50 - 51))
- Ninpu Sentai Hurricanger (2002) (Second Spear Chuuzubo (ep 1-19, 51))
- Ultra Seven Evolution (2002) (Alien Godora II (ep 2))
- Ultraman Cosmos 2: The Blue Planet (2002) (Sandros)
- Ultraman Mebius & Ultraman Brothers (2006) (Alien Temperor)
- GoGo Sentai Boukenger (2006) (Wicked Evil Dragon Lindom (ep 13))
- Ultraman Mebius (2006) (Deathrem (ep 43, 45)
- Engine Sentai Go-onger (2009) (Savage Land Water Sky Special Barbaric Machine Beast Kettei Banki (ep 48)
- Samurai Sentai Shinkenger (2009) (Ayakashi Ootsumuji (ep 2))
- Tomica Hero: Rescue Fire (2009) (Donkaken (eps. 1 - 26) (48 - 51 Voiced by Ryūzaburō Ōtomo))
- Ultraman Mebius Side Story: Ghost Reverse (2009) (Deathrem (g))

=== Television commercials ===
- Toon Disney (Japan) (Jetix narrator)

=== Dubbing roles ===
==== Live-action ====
- 2 Fast 2 Furious (Agent Bilkins (Thom Barry))
- Alien (VHS/DVD edition) (Parker (Yaphet Kotto))
- Aliens (1988 TBS edition) (Private Frost (Ricco Ross))
- Armageddon (2004 Nippon TV edition) (Jayotis "Bear" Kurleenbear (Michael Clarke Duncan))
- Back to the Future (1989 TV Asahi edition) (Pa Peabody (Will Hare))
- Beautiful Joe (Joe (Billy Connolly))
- A Bridge Too Far (Günther Blumentritt (Hans von Borsody))
- Cannonball Run II (Arnold (Richard Kiel))
- Casper (1998 Nippon TV edition) (Fatso (Brad Garrett))
- CHiPs (Officer Gene Fritz)
- Colby's Missing Memory (Colby the Christian Robot)
- The Country Bears (Fred Bedderhead (Brad Garrett))
- Ewoks: The Battle for Endor (Terak)
- The Da Vinci Code (Lieutenant Jérôme Collet (Étienne Chicot))
- Das Boot (1983 Fuji TV edition) (Ario)
- Die Hard (1990 TV Asahi edition) (James (Wilhelm von Homburg))
- Die Hard 2 (1992 Fuji TV edition) (Major Grant (John Amos))
- Dr. Dolittle 2 (2007 TV Asahi edition) (Joe Potter (Jeffrey Jones))
- Ed Wood (Tor Johnson (George Steele))
- Faces of Death V (Narrator)
- Fearless Hyena Part II (Shek Earth / Jaws Four (Dean Shek))
- Ghostbusters II (1998 TV Asahi edition) (Vigo the Carpathian (Wilhelm von Homburg))
- Gone in 60 Seconds (2004 Nippon TV edition) (The Sphinx (Vinnie Jones))
- The Goonies (1988 TBS edition) (Sloth Fratelli (John Matuszak), Policeman)
- In the Line of Fire (1996 TV Asahi edition) (Matt Wilder (Gregory Alan Williams))
- Lethal Weapon 3 (1995 TV Asahi edition) (Tyrone)
- Men in Black (2001 Nippon TV edition) (Arquillian (Carel Struycken))
- The Messenger: The Story of Joan of Arc (La Hire (Richard Ridings))
- Mighty Morphin Power Rangers: The Movie (Lord Zedd)
- The Mummy Returns (2005 TV Asahi edition) (The Scorpion King (Dwayne Johnson))
- Predator 2 (Predator (Kevin Peter Hall))
- Rocky III (1987 TBS edition) (Thunderlips (Hulk Hogan))
- The Running Man (1990 TV Asahi edition) (Dynamo (Erland Van Lidth De Jeude))
- Sin (Eddie Burns (Ving Rhames))
- Small Soldiers (VHS/2002 Nippon TV editions) (Brick Bazooka (George Kennedy))
- Sudden Impact (Horace King (Albert Popwell))
- Surrogates (The Prophet (Ving Rhames))
- Teenage Mutant Ninja Turtles (Fuji TV edition) (Chief Sterns (Raymond Serra))
- Transformers: Revenge of the Fallen (Soundwave (Frank Welker))
- Twin Peaks (Hank Jennings (Chris Mulkey))
- Where the Wild Things Are (Ira (Forest Whitaker))
- Year of the Dragon (1988 TBS edition) (Angelo Rizzo (Leonard Termo))
- Zombi 2 (1982 TBS edition) (Bryan Curt (Al Cliver))

==== Animation ====
- Bionicle: Mask of Light (Makuta)
- A Bug's Life (Dim the Rhino Beetle)
- Brother Bear (Tug)
- Duck Dodgers (K'chutha Sa'am)
- Finding Nemo (Bruce the Great White Shark)
- G.I. Joe: The Movie (Roadblock, Destro)
- Gargoyles (Anton Sevarius Junior)
- The Iron Giant (The Iron Giant)
- Iron Man (The Hulk)
- The Jungle Book (Baloo)
- The Jungle Book 2 (Baloo)
- Kung Fu Panda (Commander Vachir)
- Lilo & Stitch (Cobra Bubbles)
- Lilo & Stitch: The Series (Cobra Bubbles)
- Looney Tunes (Yosemite Sam)
- Meet the Robinsons (CEO)
- Police Academy: The Animated Series (Moses Hightower)
- Robin Hood (Buena Vista edition) (Little John)
- The Simpsons (Judge Snyder (season 13) and Michael Clarke Duncan-type (season 13))
- Sleeping Beauty (Goon)
- Song of the South (Br'er Bear)
- Space Jam (Yosemite Sam)
- TaleSpin (Baloo)
- Treasure Planet (2003) (Mr. Arow)
- Teenage Mutant Ninja Turtles (Leatherhead)
- Thomas and Friends (1990-2007)
  - Diesel - Seasons 2-3 and 7-8
  - The Spiteful Breakvan - Season 2
  - Bulgy - Seasons 3 and 7
  - The Barber - Season 2
  - Jem Cole - Season 3
- Timon & Pumbaa (Mister Bear)
- Tom and Jerry: Blast Off to Mars (Commander Bristle)
- X-Men (TV Tokyo edition) (Bishop)
