= Issei Futamata =

Japanese voice actor

- 二又 一成
- Born: Kazunari Futamata; Misawa, Aomori, Japan
- Occupations: Voice actor; narrator
- Years active: 1975–present
- Agent: Tokyo Actor's Consumer's Cooperative Society
- Spouse: Tomoka Kiriyama (m. 2013)
- Children: 1

Issei Futamata (二又 一成, Futamata Issei) is a Japanese voice actor and narrator. He is best known for the roles of Skullomania (Street Fighter EX and Fighting EX Layer), Yusaku Godai (Maison Ikkoku), Chibi (Urusei Yatsura), Kiyoshi Shusse (High School! Kimengumi), Kinkotsuman (Kinnikuman), and Saburou (Sazae-san). His wife is fellow voice actress Tomoka Kiriyama (桐山 智花, Kiriyama Tomoka).

== Biography ==
After graduating from high school, he worked for about a year in Tokyo to buy a motorcycle. He then finished work after "achieving his purpose". After attending a vocational school for DJs, he made his voice actor debut. Futamata is a regular voice actor on Rumiko Takahashi's work. He voiced Yusaku Godai in Maison Ikkoku, Chibi in Urusei Yatsura, Hikaru Gosunkugi in Ranma ½ and Tesso in Inuyasha.

He married Tomoka Kiriyama in 2013. On July 3, 2014, their first child was born.

== Filmography ==
=== Anime series ===
1970s

- Future Boy Conan (1978) (Monte)
- Haikara-san ga Tōru (1978) (Kobayashi)
- Mobile Suit Gundam (1979) (Ortega, Judakku, Konrī, Shin, Jobu, John, Omuru Hangu, Karu)

1980s

- Fang of the Sun Dougram (1981) (Aaron)
- Golden Warrior Gold Lightan (1981) (Gold Lightan)
- Ninja Hattori-kun (1981) (Koike-sensei)
- Urusei Yatsura (1981) (Chibi)
- Combat Mecha Xabungle (1982) (Kid Horla)
- Gyakuten! Ippatsuman (1982) (Chiba)
- Armored Trooper Votoms (1983) (Guran)
- Kinnikuman (1983) (Kinkotsuman, SteCase King, Sneagator, various others)
- Mirai Keisatsu Urashiman (1983) (Stinger Shark)
- Doraemon (1984) (Suneyoshi I, Kyōbō)
- High School! Kimengumi (1985) (Kiyoshi Shusse)
- Sazae-san (1985) (Saburō)
- Dragon Ball (1986) (Usagi gang member)
- Maison Ikkoku (1986) (Yusaku Godai)
- City Hunter (1987) (Yonezawa)
- Meimon! Daisan Yakyūbu (1988) (Rinta Saitō)
- Ronin Warriors (1988) (Dokumashō Nāza)
- Saint Seiya (1988) (Scylla Io)
- Patlabor: The TV Series (1989) (Mikiyasu Shinshi)

1990s

- Brave Exkaiser (1990) (Kōmori)
- Gobo-chan (1990) (Kōji Tabata)
- Robin Hood no Daiboken (1990) (Prince John)
- Ranma ½ (1991) (Hikaru Gosunkugi)
- Yadamon (1992) (Eddie)
- YuYu Hakusho (1992) (Shikkō, Urashima, Yū Kaitō)
- Tanoshii Willow Town (1993) (Fork)
- Mobile Fighter G Gundam (1994) (Chandora Shijīma)
- Slayers NEXT (1996) (Kanzel)
- Kindaichi Case Files (1997) (Seiji Hazawa, Saruhiko Senda, Kaneharu Hiiragi, Atsuya Kinone, Wataru Iwaya, Yoshiki Maruyama)
- Nessa no Haō Gandāra (1998) (Sydney)

2000s

- Digimon Tamers (2001) (Sinduramon)
- Inuyasha (2002) (Tesso)
- MegaMan NT Warrior (2002) (Heatman.EXE)
- Ashita no Nadja (2003) (Heruman)
- The Big O (2003) (Alan Gabriel)
- Zatch Bell! (2003) (English gentleman, Robert Vile)
- One Piece (2003) (Bayan, Gabanā)
- Futari wa Pretty Cure (2004) (Irukubo)
- Ah! My Goddess (2005) (Hikozaemon Otaki)
- Gun Sword (2005) (Zakota)
- Onegai My Melody (2005) (Uta's Father)
- Code Geass (2006) (Kōsetsu Urabe)
- Hell Girl (2006) (Takashi Murai)
- Kenichi: The Mightiest Disciple (2006) (Kensei Ma)
- Mahjong Legend Akagi (2006) (Takeshi Ōgi)
- Death Note (2007) (Kyōsuke Higuchi)
- Hero Tales (2007) (Shimei)

2010s

- Stitch! ~Best Friends Forever~ (2010) (Professor)
- Kaiji: Against All Rules (2011) (Kōtarō Sakazaki)
- Hunter × Hunter (2011) (Narrator, Peggy, Puhat & loupe)
- Saint Seiya Ω (2013) (Chakram Europa)
- Parasyte -the maxim- (2014) (Shirō Kuramori)
- The World is Still Beautiful (2014) (Catesby)
- A Centaur's Life (2017) (Zhang Lu)
- In Another World With My Smartphone (2017) (Snake of Black Tortoise /Kokuyou (ep. 10))
- Gurazeni (2018) (Tanabe)
- Afterlost (2019) (Zenshirō)

=== Original video animation ===
- Urusei Yatsura series (1985–89) (Chibi)
- Violence Jack: Harlem Bomber (1986) (Laser)
- Mobile Police Patlabor (1988) (Mikiyasu Shinshi)
- One-pound Gospel (1988) (Ishida)
- Guyver (1989) (Aptom)
- Legend of the Galactic Heroes (1989) (Flegel)
- Violence Jack: Hell's Wind (1990) (Joker)
- Here Is Greenwood (1991) (Nagisa's henchman)
- Dōkyūsei (1994) (Kazuya Sakagami)
- Shonan Junai Gumi (1994) (Onizuka Eikichi)
- Twin Signal: Family Game (1996) (Masanobu Otoi)
- Saint Seiya: Chapter Elysion (2008) (Hypnos)

=== Anime films ===
- Doraemon: Nobita and the Haunts of Evil (1982) (Soldier)
- Xabungle Graffiti (1983) (Kid Horla)
- Choro Q Dougram (1983) (Aaron)
- Urusei Yatsura series (1983–91) (Chibi)
- High School! Kimengumi (1986) (Kiyoshi Shusse)
- Akira (1988) (Takaba)
- Maison Ikkoku Kanketsuhen (1988) (Yusaku Godai)
- Doraemon: Nobita and the Birth of Japan (1989) (Utabe)
- The Five Star Stories (1989) (Torōra)
- Patlabor: The Movie (1989) (Mikiyasu Shinshi)
- Patlabor 2: The Movie (1993) (Mikiyasu Shinshi)
- Crayon Shin-chan: Unkokusai's Ambition (1995) (Jokoman)
- Dorami & Doraemons: Robot School's Seven Mysteries (1996) (Ed)
- Ah! My Goddess The Movie (2000) (Hikozaemon Otaki)
- WXIII: Patlabor the Movie 3 (2002) (Mikiyasu Shinshi)
- The Princess and the Pilot (2011) (Hermann)
- Doraemon: Nobita and the Island of Miracles—Animal Adventure (2012) (Snake)
- Hunter × Hunter: Phantom Rouge (2013) (Kurta Clan Elder)
- Short Peace (2013) (Marl)
- The Empire of Corpses (2015) (Narrator)
- The Legend of the Galactic Heroes: Die Neue These Seiran (2019) (Arthur Lynch)
- One Piece Film: Red (2022) (Building Snake)

=== Video games ===
- Ajito 2 (Uzumaking #1)
- Armored Core 3 (Fanfāre)
- Armored Core: Last Raven (Alliance Kisaragi Sect)
- Evil Zone (aka Eretzvaju) (Linedwell Rainrix)
- Kinnikuman Muscle Grand Prix Max (SteCase King, Sneagator, Benkiman, Silverman)
- Linda Cube (Hume Burning)
- Linda Cube Again (Hume Burning)
- Mobile Suit Gundam series (Ortega)
- PoPoRoGue (Misha)
- Rockman 8 (Astroman, Grenademan, Cutman)
- Rockman X4 (Web Spider, Cyber Kujacker)
- Resident Evil 3 (Oswell E. Spencer)
- Shenmue (Chai)
- Soul Hackers (Sukeroku/Kyouji Kuzunoha)
- Street Fighter EX (Skullomania)
- Suikoden V (Babbage, Murādo, Dilber)
- Super Robot Wars series (Helmut)
- Tatsunoko vs. Capcom (Gold Ligthan)

=== Tokusatsu ===
- The 6 Ultra Brothers vs. the Monster Army (1974) (Hanuman)
- Ultraman Tiga (1996) (Narrator, Computer (ep 3), Ultraman (ep 49))
- Chōsei Kantai Sazer-X
- Tokkei Winspector (1990) (Demitas)
- Kamen Rider Black RX (1989) (Strange Demon Robot Metaheavy (ep 30))
- Gekisou Sentai Carranger (1996) (Speed King Max/KK Esu (ep 9))
- Tokusou Sentai Dekaranger (2004) (voice of superior officer (ep 1))
- Engine Sentai Go-onger (2008) (Savage Sky Barbaric Machine Beast Speaker Banki (ep 6))
- Samurai Sentai Shinkenger (2009) (Ayakashi Zuboshimeshi (ep 6))
- Hikounin Sentai Akibaranger (2012) (Yoyogisujibokehashirigumo]] (ep 8))
- Ressha Sentai ToQger (2014) (Pin Spot Shadow (ep 25))
- Shuriken Sentai Ninninger (2015) (Advanced Yokai Konakijiji (ep 34))

=== CDs ===
- Gensōmaden Saiyūki Part 10 (Chin Īsō)
- Shōnen Gangan Comic CD Collection 9: Violinist of Hameln Vol.3 (Warrior King Guitar)
- Shy (original performance)
- Street Fighter Zero Gaiden (Ken)
- Twin Signal (Masanobu Otoi)
- Yoroiden Samurai Troopers: Best Friends (Dokumashō Nāza)
- Yoroiden Samurai Troopers Drama CD: Tsuki (Dokumashō Nāza)

=== Theatre ===
- 「剣ヶ崎」, a play by Tachihara Masaaki

=== Japanese voice-over ===
- Roger Rabbit's Car Toon Spin (Stupid)

=== Other voice-overs ===
- Climber (Beckman)
- Heroic Duo (Au Yonhai)
- Soul (Che)

=== Dubbing roles ===
==== Live-action ====
- Airheads (Rex (Steve Buscemi))
- Alien Resurrection (Dom Vriess (Dominique Pinon))
- Back to the Future (1989 TV Asahi edition) (Skinhead (J. J. Cohen))
- Back to the Future Part II (1992 TV Asahi edition) (Skinhead (J. J. Cohen))
- Back to the Future Part III (Buford Tannen's Gang (Sean Sullivan), Douglas J. Needles (Flea))
- The Big Lebowski (Blu-Ray edition) (Donny Kerabatsos (Steve Buscemi))
- Con Air (Garland "The Marietta Mangler" Greene (Steve Buscemi))
- The Crow (1997 TV Tokyo edition) (Tin Tin (Laurence Mason))
- Diana (Patrick Jephson (Charles Edwards))
- Existenz (Yevgeny Nourish (Don McKellar))
- Fearless Hyena Part II
- Game Change (Rick Davis (Peter MacNicol))
- Get Out (Dean Armitage (Bradley Whitford))
- Honey, I Blew Up the Kid (Wayne Szalinski (Rick Moranis))
- Honey, We Shrunk Ourselves (Wayne Szalinski (Rick Moranis))
- Knight and Day (John Fitzgerald (Peter Sarsgaard))
- The Mandalorian (Moff Gideon (Giancarlo Esposito))
- The Matrix Reloaded (Ghost (Anthony Wong))
- The Matrix Revolutions (Ghost (Anthony Wong))
- Platoon (1989 TV Asahi edition) (Crawford (Chris Pedersen))
- Saving Private Ryan (Corporal Timothy Upham (Jeremy Davies))
- Teenage Mutant Ninja Turtles II: The Secret of the Ooze (Raphael (Kenn Troum))
- Twin Peaks (Bobby Briggs (Dana Ashbrook))
- Winners and Sinners (Exhaust Pipe / Wind Pipe (Richard Ng))

==== Animation ====
- Brother Bear (Fish the Salmon, Mitlee Bear)
- Brother Bear 2 (Mitlee Bear)
- Detective Conan (Kyuuma Takuya) (Ep.573)
- House of Mouse (Tigger, Father Duck)
- Duck Tales (Fenton Crackshell/Gizmoduck)
- Finding Nemo (Chame)
- A Goofy Movie (Margan)
- The Great Mouse Detective (Prippey)
- Hercules (Panic)
- The Jungle Book (Flunkey)
- The Jungle Book 2 (Flunkey)
- Leroy & Stitch (Dr. Him)
- Lilo & Stitch (Dr. Him)
- Lilo & Stitch 2: Stitch Has a Glitch (Dr. Him)
- Lilo & Stitch: The Series (Dr. Him)
- The Lion King (Goply)
- Oliver and Company (But Fenally)
- Ralph Breaks the Internet (Surge Protector)
- Robin Hood (Trigger)
- Stitch! the Movie (Dr. Him)
- Tarzan (Greeb)
- Tarzan 2 (Greeb)
- Tarzan and Jane (Greeb)
- Treasure Planet (Captain Booh)
- WALL-E (Auto Pilot)
- Who Framed Roger Rabbit (Stupid, Daffy Duck)
- Wreck-It Ralph (Surge Protector)

=== Other ===
- The Waste Land (2009, TV drama) (Narrator)
- The Blood of Wolves (2018, film) (Narrator)
