= Toshihiko Kojima =

Japanese actor and voice actor

- 小島 敏彦
- Born: August 10, 1940 (age 85); Chiba Prefecture, Japan
- Occupations: Actor; voice actor
- Years active: 1970–present
- Height: 173 cm (5 ft 8 in)

Toshihiko Kojima (小島 敏彦, Kojima Toshihiko; born August 10, 1940) is a Japanese actor and voice actor from Chiba Prefecture, Japan.

== Filmography ==
=== Television dramas ===
- Wataru Seken wa Oni Bakari (Sakurada)

=== Television animation ===
- Space Battleship Yamato II (1978) (Hyogo Todo)
- Space Warrior Baldios (1980)
- Lucy of the Southern Rainbow (1982) (Frank Princeton)
- Bismark (1985) (Jean-Paul Marcel)
- Little Women (1987) (John Brooke)
- Patlabor (1989) (Kaihou)
- Little Women II: Jo's Boys (1993) (John Brooke)
- My Patrasche (1993) (Benois)
- Zenki (1995) (Kyoji Goto)
- Detective Conan (1996) (Doctor)
- Cinderella Monogatari (1996) (Marquess)
- Berserk (1998) (Military Officer D, Minister A)
- Detective Conan (1998) (Wataru Takanashi)
- Master Keaton (1998) (Fumio Hisayama)
- Arc the Lad II (1999)
- Detective Conan (1999) (Yoshiteru Araide)
- Detective Conan (2000) (Kenzo Shiozawa)
- Detective Conan (2001) (Kanenari Mochizuki)
- Elfen Lied (2004) (Detective A)
- Mezzo DSA (2004) (Ando)
- Detective Conan (2005) (Senkichi Matsuura)
- Cluster Edge (2005)
- Monster (2005) (Detective Janda)
- Black Lagoon: The Second Barrage (2006) (Vasili Laptev)
- Tales of the Abyss (2008) (Sesemann)
- Giant Killing (2010) (Kurashige)
- Gundam Reconguista in G (2014) (Zucchini)
- Psycho-Pass 2 (2014) (Masuda)

=== OVA ===
- Laughing Target (1987) (Classics teacher)
- Legend of the Galactic Heroes (1992) (Asadora Chartian)
- Master Keaton (1998) (Harold Smith)

=== Theatrical animation ===
- Patlabor: The Movie (1989) (Kaihou)
- Patlabor 2: The Movie (1993) (Kaihou)
- WXIII: Patlabor the Movie 3 (2002) (Kaihou)

=== Video games ===
- Star Wars Rogue Squadron II: Rogue Leader (2002) (Japanese dub (Jan Dodonna))
- God of War (2005) (Japanese dub (Zeus))
- Boku no Natsuyasumi (2006) (Vice-principal)
- God of War II (2007) (Japanese dub (Zeus))

=== Dubbing ===
==== Live-action ====
- François Berléand
  - The Transporter (Inspector Tarconi)
  - Transporter 2 (Inspector Tarconi)
  - Transporter 3 (Inspector Tarconi)
  - Le Concert (Olivier Morne Duplessis)
  - Transporter: The Series (Inspector Tarconi)
- Richard Jenkins
  - Blue Steel (Dawson)
  - Burn After Reading (Ted Treffon)
  - Friends with Benefits (Dylan Harper, Sr)
  - Jack Reacher (Alex Rodin)
  - Killing Them Softly (Driver)
- Tom Wilkinson
  - Shakespeare in Love (Hugh Fennyman)
  - The Exorcism of Emily Rose (Father Richard Moore)
  - The Green Hornet (James Reid)
  - Mission: Impossible – Ghost Protocol (IMF Secretary)
  - Unfinished Business (Timothy McWinters)
- 15 Minutes (Deputy Chief Declan Duffy (James Handy))
- The Amazing Spider-Man (Gustav Fiers (Michael Massee))
- The Amityville Horror (1982 NTV edition) (Jeff (Michael Sacks))
- Annie (Waiter at Domani (Ray Iannicelli))
- The Art of War (Ambassador Wu (James Hong))
- Blood Father (Tom 'Preacher' Harris (Michael Parks))
- The Brave (Larry (Marshall Bell))
- Clear and Present Danger (James Cutter (Harris Yulin))
- Con Air (2000 TV Asahi edition) (Devers (John Roselius))
- Coneheads (Gorman Seedling (Michael McKean))
- The Corruptor (Sean Wallace (Brian Cox))
- Daylight (Norman Bassett (Barry Newman))
- Die Hard with a Vengeance (1998 Fuji TV edition) (Bill Jarvis (Michael Cristofer))
- Escape from L.A. (President (Cliff Robertson))
- Fantastic Beasts and Where to Find Them (Gilbert Bingley (Peter Breitmayer))
- Fearless Hyena Part II (Ching Chun-nam / Old Chan (James Tien))
- The Fountain (Grand Inquisitor Silecio (Stephen McHattie))
- Freedom Writers (Steve Gruwell (Scott Glenn))
- Frida (Leon Trotsky (Geoffrey Rush))
- Friends (season 2 onward) (Jack Geller (Elliott Gould))
- Gambit (The Major (Tom Courtenay))
- The Goonies (Irving Walsh (Keith Walker))
- A Hidden Life (Judge Lueben (Bruno Ganz))
- Hill Street Blues (Officer Andy Renko (Charles Haid))
- Howard the Duck (1992 TBS edition) (Lieutenant Welker (Paul Guilfoyle))
- I Am Sam (Robert (Stanley DeSantis))
- In the Mood for Love (Mr. Ho (Kelly Lai Chen))
- Jobs (Arthur Rock (J. K. Simmons))
- Judge Dredd (Judge Esposito (Peter Marinker))
- K-19: The Widowmaker (Dr. Gennadi Savran (Donald Sumpter))
- Kramer vs. Kramer (2009 Blu-Ray edition) (Jim O'Connor (George Coe))
- L.A. Confidential (Pierce Morehouse Patchett (David Strathairn))
- Lethal Weapon (1997 TV Asahi edition) (Michael Hunsaker (Tom Atkins))
- Lincoln (William H. Seward (David Strathairn))
- Métal Hurlant Chronicles (Kern (Rutger Hauer))
- Michel Vaillant (Henri Vaillant (Jean-Pierre Cassel))
- Miss March (Hugh Hefner)
- A Moment to Remember (Mr. Kim (Park Sang-gyu))
- Monsoon Wedding (Lalit Verma (Naseeruddin Shah))
- The Monuments Men (President Harry S. Truman (Christian Rodska))
- The Natural (Max Mercy (Robert Duvall))
- The Negotiator (2001 TV Asahi edition) (Chief Al Travis) (John Spencer))
- The NeverEnding Story (Teeny Weeny (Deep Roy), Mr. Bux (Gerald McRaney))
- Nowhere Boy (George Toogood Smith (David Threlfall))
- Point of No Return (Victor 'The Cleaner' (Harvey Keitel))
- The Prestige (John Cutter (Michael Caine))
- The Punisher (Dino Moretti (Bryan Marshall))
- The Purple Rose of Cairo (Henry (Edward Herrmann))
- Red (Alexander Dunning (Richard Dreyfuss))
- The Rock (1999 NTV edition) (Lonner (Xander Berkeley))
- The Rock (2000 TV Asahi edition) (James Womack (John Spencer))
- Screamers (2000 Fuji TV edition) (Secretary Green (Bruce Boa))
- Single White Female (Mitchell Myerson (Stephen Tobolowsky))
- The Social Network (Gage (David Selby))
- Some Kind of Beautiful (Gordon (Malcolm McDowell))
- The Sound of Music (50th Anniversary edition) (Franz (Gil Stuart))
- Star Trek: The Motion Picture (Leonard McCoy (DeForest Kelley))
- Star Wars: Episode I – The Phantom Menace (Mas Amedda (David Bowers))
- Star Wars: Episode II – Attack of the Clones (Mas Amedda (David Bowers))
- Star Wars: Episode III – Revenge of the Sith (Mas Amedda (David Bowers))
- Stealing Cars (Philip Wyatt (William H. Macy))
- Time Bandits (1988 TV Asahi edition) (Compere (Jim Broadbent))
- True Crime (Alan Mann (James Woods))
- Twixt (Bobby LaGrange (Bruce Dern))
- Unknown (Ernst Jürgen (Bruno Ganz))
- Vegas Vacation (Cousin Eddie Johnson (Randy Quaid))
- Virus (J. W. Woods Jr. (Marshall Bell))
- Wall Street: Money Never Sleeps (Dr. Masters (Austin Pendleton))
- The Young Pope (Cardinal Michael Spencer (James Cromwell))

==== Animation ====
- The Adventures of Tintin (Allan Thompson)
- Batman: The Animated Series (Frederick)
- Star Wars: The Clone Wars (Mas Amedda)
