= Patlabor 2: The Movie =

1993 Japanese anime film by Mamoru Oshii

- Japanese theatrical poster
- Directed by: Mamoru Oshii
- Written by: Kazunori Itō
- Based on: Patlabor by Headgear
- Produced by: Mitsuhisa Ishikawa; Shin Unozawa; Tsuyoshi Hamawatari
- Starring: Ryūsuke Ōbayashi; Yoshiko Sakakibara; Naoto Takenaka
- Cinematography: Akihiko Takahashi
- Edited by: Shuichi Kakesu; Yasue Funami
- Music by: Kenji Kawai
- Production company: Production I.G
- Distributed by: Shochiku
- Release date: August 7, 1993
- Running time: 113 minutes
- Country: Japan
- Language: Japanese
- Budget: ¥220 million ($2 million)
- Box office: ¥180,000,000

Patlabor 2: The Movie (機動警察パトレイバー 2 the Movie, Kidō Keisatsu Patoreibā 2 the Movie) is a 1993 Japanese animated science fiction political thriller film directed by Mamoru Oshii and written by Kazunori Itō, who also respectively directed and wrote Patlabor: The Movie. It was produced by Production I.G, Bandai Visual and Tohokushinsha.

Patlabor 2 strays from past iterations of the Patlabor series by heavily focusing on political themes. It touches on domestic and international issues that the Japanese government faced during the 20th century. The film focuses on the post-occupation status of Japan, during which the country had economically, politically and technologically progressed under prosperous years without being involved in another war after the nation surrendered and was occupied by the United States-led Allied forces after the end of World War II.

== Plot ==
Set in 2002, three years after the events of the first movie, Noa Izumi and Asuma Shinohara are now testing new Labors at a facility run by the Metropolitan Police. Isao Ota is a police academy Labor instructor. Mikiyasu Shinshi has since been reassigned as the Tokyo Metropolitan Police's head of General Affairs. Seitaro Sakaki has retired with Shigeo Shiba taking over his position as head of the labor maintenance team with Hiromi Yamazaki, Kiichi Goto and Shinobu Nagumo remaining with the unit as Kanuka Clancy had permanently returned to New York. Most of them had been replaced by fresh labor pilots.

Suspicious events begin to materialize with the face of a military takeover of Tokyo by GSDF forces and martial law after the Yokohama Bay Bridge is destroyed by a missile, with belief that the JASDF was the culprit. Protests in various JSDF bases take place as a means of conveying their denial of the bridge attack. Before long, public panic comes as JGSDF-marked gunships attack in several bridges in Tokyo Bay, various communication centers and SV2 headquarters, coupled by the release of a supposed deadly gas after Special Assault Team snipers shoot down an auto-piloted blimp that was responsible for jamming all electronics in the Greater Tokyo Area.

Goto and Nagumo once more assemble the original Section 2 members in an abandoned subway passage as they embark on a secret operation to apprehend Yukihito Tsuge, a former GSDF officer who planned the terrorist attacks as a means of forcing the country to face its own military inadequacies after decades of peace. With the threat of military intervention by the United States Forces Japan looming unless the government controls the situation, the team uses an old stretch of the Ginza Line to approach an artificial island Tsuge uses as his hideout. Goto also takes care of things on his end by facilitating the arrest of Shigeki Arakawa, a GSDF intelligence agent who is actually one of Tsuge's former cohorts. After a fierce fight inside the artificial island's tunnel which results in flooding, the team evacuates the tunnel while Nagumo breaks through to finally arrest Tsuge.

== Cast ==
Character	Original Japanese	English (Manga UK)	English (Bandai Visual)
Kiichi Goto	Ryunosuke Ohbayashi	Peter Marinker	Roger Craig Smith
Shinobu Nagumo	Yoshiko Sakakibara	Sharon Holm	Megan Hollingshead
Shigeki Arakawa	Naoto Takenaka	Blair Fairman	Kim Strauss
Yukihito Tsuge	Jinpachi Nezu	Bob Sherman	Robert Clotworthy
Noa Izumi	Miina Tominaga	Briony Glassico	Julie Ann Taylor
Asuma Shinohara	Toshio Furukawa	David Jarvis	Doug Erholtz
Isao Ohta	Michihiro Ikemizu	Martin McDougall	Sam Riegel
Mikiyasu Shinshi	Issei Futamata	Ron Lepaz	Joe Ochman
Hiromi Yamazaki	Daisuke Gouri	Michael Fitzpatrick	Jason C. Miller
Shigeo Shiba	Shigeru Chiba	Edward Glen	Peter Doyle
Seitaro Sakaki	Osamu Saka	Blair Fairman	Jamieson Price
Matsui	Tomomichi Nishimura	Mac McDougall	Paul St. Peter
Kaihou	Toshihiko Kojima		Paul St. Peter

== Production ==
Production of Patlabor the Movie 2 started after Kazunori Ito was appointed as the scriptwriter for the upcoming movie back in the early 1990s. The original plan called for the same plot used in the original OVA series episode "The SV2's Longest Day", which showed renegade JGSDF soldiers and officers conspiring to undermine and overthrow the Japanese government. However, it was soon abandoned when Mamoru Oshii told Kazunori Ito that maybe the scope of terrorists causing havoc under the cover of a coup would be a better movie idea.

Ito soon met with other members of HEADGEAR to create some ideas that can be used for the movie, based on the theory that Patlabor 2 will be their last work on the Patlabor franchise. Soon after realizing that he couldn't take most of their suggestions, Ito had told them that he would end his consultation with them and announced that he would brainstorm the movie's script alone and isolated himself from the rest of HEADGEAR to give him some space to work on the movie's script with Oshii working on the storyboard.

The amateur footage on the SSN new broadcast of the Yokohama Bay Bridge attack is a reference to Japanese history. The time shown on the amateur footage is 2:26, a reference to the February 26 Incident, where Kōdō-ha fanatics of the Imperial Japanese Army tried to occupy central Tokyo as part of a coup d'état attempt.

== Subject ==
=== Thematic background ===
One key thematic elements of the film is the Japanese Self-Defense Forces and on their legality as Japan's military force since Article 9 of the Japanese Constitution, created by the Allied Forces following the Second World War, meant that the JSDF is only allowed to defend Japanese territory from hostile invasion and not to be deployed in any manner on foreign soil.

Kazunori Ito and Mamoru Oshii were opposed to the deployment of JSDF personnel to participate in UNTAC, a UN peace keeping mission in Cambodia.

=== Basis ===
At the time of Patlabor 2's release in 1993, a lot of issues had faced the Japanese government in both the domestic and international level. These issues included the end of the Soviet Union, Japan's economic prosperity in the 1980s, the outbreak of the First Gulf War, and 1990 market crash that left many Japanese devastated. In an interview with Animage magazine in October 1993, Hayao Miyazaki said that the opening scene of the movie must have been inspired by Cambodia, especially with the appearance of what seems to be Angkor Thom. He and Mamoru Oshii also discussed the limitations placed by the post-WWII Japanese constitution on the JSDF and the character of the JSDF more generally.

Several real-life incidents were also mentioned or used for the movie. For instance, references to Viktor Belenko's defection to Japan in 1976 were mentioned by Arakawa himself when he spoke to Goto and Nagumo.

== Release ==
It was shown originally in Japanese theaters on August 7, 1993. Later in 1998, the movie was released again with Dolby Digital 5.1 channel remix and additional music.

Patlabor 2: The Movie was dubbed and released in 1995 in UK by Manga Entertainment and by Manga Entertainment in the US in 1996. In the mid 2000s, Manga Entertainment lost the licenses to Patlabor: The Movie and Patlabor 2: The Movie in the UK and the US, but retained the license in Australia, where Manga Entertainment properties are distributed by Madman Entertainment. Bandai Visual later released the film under their North American label, Honneamise, with a new English dub produced by Elastic Media Corporation.

Aside from Bandai Visual having the license to North America and the UK, Panorama owns the license for Patlabor 2 to Hong Kong and Macau with a Cantonese dub and subtitles aside from the original Japanese dub.

In Japan, Bandai Visual/Emotion has released Patlabor 2 on DVD, Blu-ray and on UMD. Only the double disc DVD/Blu-ray and DVD/HD DVD sets as well as the single disc Blu-ray release has the remade English dub and subtitles. The Blu-ray also includes a booklet that includes illustrations and screenshots from the movie.

In Australia & New Zealand, Patlabor 2 was released dubbed on VHS in 1996 by Manga Entertainment UK, and on DVD in 2003 by Madman Entertainment under licence from Manga Entertainment, including Dolby Surround 4.0 mixes of both the original Manga UK English dub and original 1993 Japanese dub. For unknown reasons, Madman had opted to use an inferior, non-anamorphic SD video source supplied by Manga USA that had undergone an NTSC conversion from a PAL master tape originating from Manga UK, which unlike Manga's release of the first Patlabor movie, used film negatives from Japan as a source and slightly sped up the framerate from 24 to 25 frames-per-second to be PAL-compliant. This resulted in slight ghosting and the introduction of a soap opera-like effect that mimicked field-blending. A remastered version of the movie has never been made available for release in Australia, despite the OVAs and TV series having been made available by Madman using remasters.

Beez Entertainment licensed the film in Europe. Section23 Films has licensed all three Patlabor films, with the second film released on Blu-ray and DVD on July 21, 2015.

== Reception ==
Patlabor 2: The Movie has largely received critical acclaim. Reviewers in the magazine J-Fan praised the film calling it "A True classic of anime", saying "Yet again, Mamorou Oshii proves that he's one of anime's finest directors with some atmosphere more akin to live action." However, Sean P. Means of The Salt Lake Tribune, praised the visuals, but recommended it only for anime fans saying "But cool visuals can't make up for a convoluted storyline."

Opinions were divided on the English dub of the film, with Means considering it "funky" and off putting, while J-Fan praising it. Both Anime News Network and J-Fan called out the film's atmosphere and music.

Theron Martin of Anime News Network gave the film a B+ rating, and notes that the background music used in the movie "favors heavy, pulsing techno beats backed by airy, haunting vocals for the intense scenes and soaring synthesized scores in other places ... If you're looking for something wholly dramatic, insightful, and mature then you've come to the right place." Raphael See of THEM Anime Reviews gave Patlabor 2 a perfect 5-star review, stating that "The nuances and elements of the plot are even more complex and involved than in Patlabor 1, although it's slightly easier to keep track of what's generally going on in this one. The storyline is intricate and political enough to make Tom Clancy grin in his military uniform. Philosophical undertones of the nature of peace and war keep this movie smart, brooding, and highly engaging."

In 1994, the film won the Mainichi Film Concours award in the category for Best Animated Film.

A sequence depicting an aerial interception of apparently rogue Japan Air Self-Defense Force F-16s by a pair of JASDF F-15 STOL/MTDs was praised in a 2022 Task & Purpose article as "the most realistic portrayal of modern air combat ever made".

== Novel series ==
- TOKYO WAR: Kidō Keisatsu Patlabor (Zenpen) (Mamoru Oshii) – April 1994
- TOKYO WAR: Kidō Keisatsu Patlabor (Kouhen) (Mamoru Oshii) – May 1994
- TOKYO WAR MOBILE POLICE PATLABOR (Mamoru Oshii) – June 2005

The 2005 release is a hardcover edition combining the two older volumes.

- THE NEXT GENERATION Patlabor: TOKYO WAR 2 Haiiro no Yuurei (Mamoru Oshii) – May 2015

Novelization of the live action movie THE NEXT GENERATION Patlabor: Shuto Kessen, and sequel to the TOKYO WAR novels.

== Sequel ==
Many entries in the Patlabor series are disconnected from each other, but Patlabor 2 saw a direct sequel in the form of the 2015 live action film THE NEXT GENERATION Patlabor: Shuto Kessen.
