= Patlabor: The Movie =

1989 Japanese anime film by Mamoru Oshii

- Original theatrical poster
- Directed by: Mamoru Oshii
- Screenplay by: Kazunori Itō
- Story by: Masami Yuki
- Based on: Patlabor by Headgear
- Produced by: Makoto Kubo; Shin Unozawa; Taro Maki
- Starring: Toshio Furukawa; Miina Tominaga; Ryunosuke Ohbayashi; Shigeru Chiba
- Cinematography: Mitsunobu Yoshida
- Edited by: Morita Edit Room
- Music by: Kenji Kawai
- Production company: I.G. Tatsunoko
- Distributed by: Shochiku
- Release date: July 15, 1989
- Running time: 98 minutes
- Country: Japan
- Language: Japanese

Patlabor: The Movie (Note: Japanese: 機動警察パトレイバー the Movie, Hepburn: Kidō Keisatsu Patoreibā za Mūbī; lit. Patlabor the Mobile Police: The Movie) is a 1989 Japanese animated science fiction film directed by Mamoru Oshii and written by Kazunori Itō, with an original story by Headgear. It was produced by Bandai Visual, Tohokushinsha and animated by I.G. Tatsunoko. It is a sequel to Studio Deen's Patlabor: The Early Days OVA mini-series.

== Plot ==
Set in 1999, Tokyo is undergoing a huge re-development program: old suburbs are being demolished and human-made islands are being constructed in Tokyo Bay under the Babylon Project. The largest construction site is the Ark, a huge man-made island that serves at the Project's nerve center and chief Labor (Note: Labor: Film's term for a mech) manufacturing facility.

However, several of the Labors being used in Tokyo, specifically those built by Shinohara Heavy Industries (SHI), suddenly activate and go haywire, even while unpiloted. The Tokyo Metropolitan Police Department's (TMPD) 2nd Special Vehicles Section (SV2) is assigned to help neutralize the malfunctioning Labors, but only the SV2's Division II is on duty around-the-clock (with Division I already on training duties elsewhere). The JGSDF is also preoccupied as they send their forces to stop their own TYPE-X10 Labor tank prototype running Shinohara Heavy Industries' new Hyper Operating System (HOS).

As Division II goes out on the field, team commander Captain Gotoh, Sgt. Asuma Shinohara, and mechanic Shige Shiba work with police Detective Matsui to find further leads on the case. They discover that all the malfunctioning Labors, plus other Labors in the Greater Tokyo Area, were equipped with Shinohara Heavy Industries' Hyper Operating System (HOS). Low-frequency resonance emanating from wind-struck high-rise buildings triggers the erratic behavior in the HOS-equipped Labors when it is picked up by their sensors. To SV2 pilot Noa Izumi's relief, no copies of the software were installed in Division II's AV98 Ingram police Labors thanks to Shige's foresight. They also learn that HOS main programmer and author, the genius Eiichi Hoba, committed suicide days before. He had personal motives against the Babylon Project and was obsessed with its Biblical references (the Ark being alluded to Noah's Ark, for example; his own name. E. Hoba—Jehovah—for another) and planted a self replicating virus in the code that would cause Labors to malfunction. A computer simulation predicts that gale-force winds acting on the Ark could send all the Labors in Tokyo into a massive rampage, especially since the Ark's size and steel framework amplifies the resonance frequencies causing them to reach farther into the city. To make matters worse, the weather bureau announces that a typhoon is expected to hit Tokyo within two days, which would cause catastrophic wind and a chain reaction.

Gotoh discreetly gets clearance from the TMPD leadership to destroy the Ark as Shige tries to dig up more evidence of Hoba's guilt to justify the operation. Kanuka Clancy returns from New York City to help in the raid. Division II attaches flotation devices to their vehicles and head out to the Ark by sea. Malfunctioning HOS-equipped Labors engage the team as soon as they land on the Ark. Ingram pilots Noa and Ohta, plus Kanuka in a hijacked new AV-X0 TYPE-0 police Labor prototype, buys time for Hiromi, Asuma and Shinshi to break into the control room and activate the Ark's self-destruct sequence. However, Kanuka loses control over the TYPE-0 in the chaos because it runs on HOS as well. Trapped by the TYPE-0 in one of the last remaining ledges, Noa climbs out of her damaged Ingram and fires her shotgun into the TYPE-0's S-RAM system to finally shut it down. With the successful destruction of the Ark, SV2 sends helicopters to rescue the team.

== Development ==
The Biblical references in the movie were due to Oshii being inspired by Noa's name's similarity to Noah, and he reused some concepts from his cancelled Lupin the Third movie as a result, with the ark being the equivalent of the cancelled film's tower of Babel. The plotline involving the architect and mastermind having committed suicide before the start of the story was also taken from the cancelled film.

Oshii also wanted to reuse part of the cancelled film's ending, but was stopped by other staff members such as Izubuchi. He would later go on to use that ending for the live action film The Next Generation Patlabor: Shuto Kessen.

== Voice actors ==
Character	Japanese	English	
Character	Japanese	Manga UK	Bandai Visual
Asuma Shinohara	Toshio Furukawa	David Jarvis	Doug Erholtz
Noa Izumi	Miina Tominaga	Briony Glassico	Julie Ann Taylor
Kiichi Goto	Ryunosuke Ohbayashi	Peter Marinker	Roger Craig Smith
Shinobu Nagumo	Yoshiko Sakakibara	Sharon Holm	Megan Hollingshead
Kanuka Clancy	Yō Inoue	Tamsin Hollo	Lisa Enochs
Isao Ohta	Michihiro Ikemizu	Martin McDougall	Sam Riegel
Mikiyasu Shinshi	Issei Futamata	Ron Lepaz	Joe Ochman
Hiromi Yamazaki	Daisuke Gouri	Michael Fitzpatrick	Jason C. Miller
Shigeo Shiba	Shigeru Chiba	Edward Glen	Peter Doyle
Seitaro Sakaki	Osamu Saka	Blain Fairman	Jamieson Price
Jitsuyama	Mahito Tsujimura	Don Fellows	Milton Lawrence
Matsui	Tomomichi Nishimura	Mac McDougall	Paul St. Peter
Kaihou	Toshihiko Kojima		Paul St. Peter
Fukushima	Shinji Ogawa	William Roberts	Bob Papenbrook
Kataoka	Kouji Tsujitani	William Dufris	Liam O'Brien

== Home media ==
The first two Patlabor films have been released on DVD numerous times. The original release uses the same master as the Laserdisc release and offers stereo Japanese. The next release featured remastered non-anamorphic letterbox video. The original North American DVD release from Manga Entertainment featured a VHS transfer and the original Manga UK English dub.

The third release, which the latest R1s from Bandai Visual use, features remastered anamorphic letterbox video and 5.1 sound. The US release features a new English dub produced by Bandai Visual. The Australian Madman/Manga UK R4 release uses the Australian Manga VHS master, and includes remixed 5.1 Manga UK dub and the original 2.0 Japanese dub. In 2008, both movies were released in Japan on Blu-ray with English audio and English subtitles.

It was licensed in Europe by Beez Entertainment. Section23 Films has licensed all three Patlabor films and the first film on Blu-ray and DVD was released on May 5, 2015.

== Reception ==
Critical reception of Patlabor: The Movie has been positive. Theron Martin of Anime News Network gave the film a B+ rating, handing out praise for the production value, story, and mecha designs, while noting that the slow pacing and light action sequences may dissuade certain viewers. Overall, Martin concluded that "those looking for a slam-bang mecha action series are looking in the wrong place, but if you want a more mature and cerebral mecha tale then Patlabor is well worth checking out."

Raphael See of THEM Anime Reviews gave Patlabor: The Movie a 4 out of 5 star rating, handing out praise for the soundtrack, story, animation, and atmosphere, while noting that the slow pacing may turn off younger audiences. See concluded that "if you've got a store of patience and don't mind having to think during your anime, you'll love this intelligent, pondering anime. If you want action, though, you had best make your way elsewhere."

== Legacy ==
Animations from the movie were used extensively in the music video "Juke Joint Jezebel" by KMFDM.
