= Kazunori Itō =

Japanese anime screenwriter and artist (born 1954)

- 伊藤 和典
- Born: December 24, 1954 (age 71); Yamagata Prefecture, Japan
- Occupation: Anime screenwriter
- Notable work: .hack, Ghost in the Shell (1995 film)

Kazunori Itō (伊藤 和典, Itō Kazunori; born December 24, 1954) is a Japanese anime screenwriter and artist who is well known for his work in the .hack franchise and his writing for the 1995 Ghost in the Shell movie. Itō supervised the writing for the novel, .hack//Another Birth which was written by his student, Miu Kawasaki. He is a member of the artist group known as Headgear. Helen McCarthy in 500 Essential Anime Movies calls him "one of the best screenwriters in anime".

== Filmography ==
Year	Work	Job
1980s
1981	Urusei Yatsura	Screenplay
1983	Magical Angel Creamy Mami	Screenplay
1984	Nausicaä of the Valley of the Wind	First draft (uncredited)
1985	Kimagure Orange Road: Shōnen Jump Special	Screenplay
1985	Dirty Pair	Screenplay
1985	Original Dirty Pair #5: Affair of Nolandia	Screenplay
1986	Urusei Yatsura: Ryoko's September Tea Party	Screenplay
1986	Maison Ikkoku	Screenplay
1986	Prefectural Earth Defense Force	Screenplay
1986	Urban Square - Kōhaku no tsuigeki	Screenplay
1987	Twilight Q	Screenplay
1987	The Red Spectacles	Screenplay
1988	Patlabor: The Early Days	Screenplay
1989	Patlabor: The TV Series	Screenplay
1989	Patlabor: The Movie	Screenplay
1990s
1990	Licca-chan fushigina Yunia monogatari	Screenplay
1991	Licca-chan fushigina mahō no ring	Screenplay
1993	Patlabor: The Movie 2	Screenplay
1993	Necronomicon	Screenplay (part 2)
1995	Ghost in the Shell	Screenplay
1995	Gamera: Guardian of the Universe	Screenplay
1996	Gamera 2: Attack of Legion	Screenplay
1999	Gamera 3: Revenge of Iris	Script
2000s
2001	Avalon	Screenplay
2001	Pistol Opera	Screenplay
2002	.hack//Sign	Screenplay, series planner, soundtrack supervisor
2002	.hack OVAs: .hack//Intermezzo, .hack//Unison, .hack//Gift	Screenplay
2002	.hack//Liminality	Screenplay
2002	.hack//Infection	Story/script
2002	.hack//Mutation	Story/script
2002	.hack//Outbreak	Story/script
2003	.hack//Liminality	Screenplay
2003	.hack//Legend of the Twilight	Characters
2003	.hack//Quarantine	Story/script
2004	.hack//Liminality	Screenplay
2005	Absolute Boy	Screenplay
2005	Digital Monster X-Evolution	Screenplay
2006	.hack//G.U. Vol.1//Rebirth	Scenario supervisor
2006	.hack//Roots	Script supervisor
2006	.hack//G.U. Vol.2//Reminisce	Scenario supervision
2006	.hack//G.U. Vol.3//Redemption (USA)	Scenario supervision
2011	.hack//The Movie	Screenplay
2020s
2026	Patlabor EZY	Script and composition
