= The Next Generation: Patlabor =

Japanese television series

THE NEXT GENERATION パトレイバー
- Television drama

The Next Generation: Patlabor
- Directed by: Mamoru Oshii, Takanori Tsujimoto, Hiroaki Yuasa, Kiyotaka Taguchi
- Written by: Mamoru Oshii, Kei Yamamura
- Music by: Kenji Kawai
- Studio: Tohokushinsha
- Original network: BS Digital, Star Channel
- Original run: March 8, 2014 – January 10, 2015
- Episodes: 14
- Live-action film

The Next Generation Patlabor: Shuto Kessen
- Directed by: Mamoru Oshii
- Written by: Mamoru Oshii
- Music by: Kenji Kawai
- Studio: Tohokushinsha
- Released: May 1, 2015 (theatrical cut); October 10, 2015 (director's cut)
- Runtime: 94 minutes (theatrical cut); 119 minutes (director's cut)

The Next Generation: Patlabor (Japanese: The Next Generation パトレイバー) is a Japanese science fiction live action series and part of the Patlabor franchise. It was produced by Tohokushinsha and distributed by Shochiku. It consists of a drama series and movie.

== Media ==
=== Drama series ===
The drama series is divided into 14 "short story" episodes released to Blu-ray and DVD and exclusively aired on BS Digital and Star Channel airing from 2014 and 2015, with limited advanced theatrical screenings dividing the series into 7 "chapters", each comprising two episodes. The Blu-ray and DVD releases also followed the theatrical screening format, with each disc containing two episodes and labelled with the same chapter number as the theatrical release. All Blu-rays also had a limited advance release before the regular one at the theatres where they were screening, except for chapter 7 which only had the regular release. Broadacsts on online streaming services follow the theatrical and video release format, dividing the series into 7 chapters instead of the 14 episodes.

=== Movie ===
The movie The Next Generation Patlabor: Shuto Kessen ("Showdown in the Capital City") (The Next Generation パトレイバー 首都決戦) released in theatres on 1 May 2015. The director's cut version of the movie was released on 10 October 2015 alongside a limited blu-ray release only available at theatres where it was screening, before the regular release alongside the theatrical cut's blu-ray and DVD on 3 November 2015. The director's cut was not released on DVD.

The movie's title is displayed as Gray Ghost The Next Generation -Patlabor- in the director's cut, which is what Oshii regards to be the movie's "true title". The movie also reuses some themes and ideas from Oshii's cancelled Lupin the Third film, namely the secret behind Haibara's identity, which he had previously wanted to use for Hoba in Patlabor: The Movie. There are no significant changes in the Director's Cut, with the differences mostly being dialogue scenes being longer, and Oshii said that the theatrical cut was a shortened version made based on the director's cut due to producers wanting it to fit within 90 minutes.

=== Novels ===
Four novels featuring new original stories set during the series penned by Yamamura and overseen by Oshii were published. A fifth novel based on the movie and written by Oshii and Yamamura together, The Next Generation Patlabor: Tokyo War 2 Haiiro no Yuurei ("The Gray Ghost") (The Next Generation パトレイバー Tokyo War 2 灰色の幽霊) was also released. The title of the fifth novel is notable because it is shown to be a direct sequel to Oshii's 1994 novelization of Patlabor 2: The Movie, Kidou Keisatsu Patlabor Tokyo War (機動警察パトレイバー Tokyo War).

== Plot ==
The story takes place in the Patlabor world's version of 2013 Tokyo, taking place after the original OVA series and movies. The completion of the Babylon Project led to disuse of Labors, and Japan is in the midst of a recession. Labors falling into disuse mean there is also no place for the patrol labor squads, which have been shrunk to only one division. The series follows the new members of SV2 as they solve cases and get into trouble like their predecessors did. The film is a direct sequel to Patlabor 2, in which followers of Yukihito Tsuge carry out terrorist attacks on Tokyo, re-enacting Tsuge's coup, and SV2 has to stop them.

== Staff ==
- Chief director – Mamoru Oshii
- Directors – Mamoru Oshii, Takanori Tsujimoto, Hiroaki Yuasa, Kiyotaka Taguchi
- Script – Mamoru Oshii, Kei Yamamura
- Music – Kenji Kawai
- Labor design – Katsuya Terada
- Visual effects – Omnibus Japan

== Cast ==
=== Series and movie ===
- Erina Mano as Akira Izumino
- Seiji Fukushi as Yūma Shiobara
- Rina Ohta as Ekaterina Krachevna Kankaeva (Kasha)
- Shigeru Chiba as Shigeo Shiba
- Toshio Kakei as Captain Keiji Gotōda
- Yoshinori Horimoto as Isamu Ōtawara
- Shigekazu Tajiri as Hiromichi Yamazaki
- Kohei Shiotsuka as Shinji Mikiya
- Yoshikatsu Fujiki as Yoshikatsu Buchiyama
- Koji Kagawa as Yukihito Tsuge
- Reiko Takashima as Kei Takahata
- Hiroki Yasumoto as the narrator

=== Movie only ===
- Aki Shibuya as the silhouette of Shinobu Nagumo
- Yoshiko Sakakibara as the voice of Shinobu Nagumo
- Kanna Mori as Rei Haibara
- Bin Konno as superintendent general of the police (cameo appearance)

== Production and development ==
The series, including the movie had a budget of ¥2.2 billion (US$20 million).

Shuto Kessen grossed ¥193 million (US$1.8 million) in revenue, and the director's cut grossed ¥14 million (US$131,000). This does not include revenue from the drama series, which was not made public, or blu-ray and DVD sales.

The series reuses some ideas and elements from Oshii's 2011 novel Bankuruwase: Keishi-chou Keibi-bu Tokushu Sharyou Ni-ka (番狂わせ 警視庁警備部特殊車輌二課)("Giant-Killers: Metropolitan Police Department Security Department Special Vehicles Section 2") in which a similar new generation of SV2, some of whom have the same names as their TNG counterparts, have to stop a terrorist attack on a soccer match. While the names are identical, the characters themselves are significantly different, some being of different genders, and as such the novel is not directly related to The Next Generation. Characters from Bin Konno's Tokyo-wan Rinkai-shou Azumi-han series also have cameo appearances in this novel, as Oshii was inspired to write it due to how Konno's series first made references to SV2 and had a cameo appearance by Goto from Patlabor. Konno later made a cameo appearance in Shuto Kessen as the superintendent general of the police.

While Oshii was the chief director of the drama series, many individual episodes were directed by Takanori Tsujimoto, Hiroaki Yuasa, Kiyotaka Taguchi, younger directors who regard him as their mentor. Additionally, while Oshii wrote the screenplays for some episodes, the majority were handled by Kei Yamamura. The movie, however, was directed and written by Oshii alone.

"Deck-up" events, where the full-scale, 9-meter tall AV-98 Ingrams used for filming are lifted from their carrier and into a standing position, were used for promoting The Next Generation at events around Japan (such as the Tokyo Motorcycle Show). Even after the end of the series, the deck-up events continue to prove popular, and the Ingram often makes an appearance at festivals around Japan.
