= Phyllis Piddington =

Australian writer

- Piddington in 1932
- Born: Phyllis Lilian Aird; October 9, 1910; Melbourne, Victoria, Australia
- Died: July 8, 2001 (aged 90); Adelaide, South Australia, Australia
- Other names: Grace Veritas

Phyllis Piddington (9 October 1910 – 8 July 2001) was an Australian writer. The eldest of daughter of Melbourne optician William James and Lilian Aird, she was one of the first female graduates from the University of Melbourne with an MA degree. After her marriage in 1938 she went to Britain to study and teach, spending the war in Aberystwyth.

She moved back to Australia in 1946, lecturing in speech and drama for 15 years. After her retirement in 1969 she published Southern Rainbow, a book set in the late 1830s of South Australia. It was adapted as an anime television series Lucy-May of the Southern Rainbow as part of World Masterpiece Theater series by Nippon Animation.

== Notable works ==
- Southern Rainbow, Oxford University Press, Melbourne, 1982 ISBN 0195543106
- "The Old Toll House", poem published in Sunlight and Shadows 2, Fellowship of Australian Writers, 1988 ISBN 0947249125
- "Holiday Before War", short story published in Silver Linings, Fellowship of Australian Writers, 1992 ISBN 0909497621
