= Southern Rainbow =

1982 children's novel by Phyllis Piddington

- First edition
- Author: Phyllis Piddington
- Illustrator: Noela Young
- Language: English
- Genre: Historical Fiction, Children's literature
- Publisher: Oxford University Press
- Publication date: 1982
- Publication place: Australia
- Media type: Print (Hardcover)
- Pages: 206
- ISBN: 0195543106

Southern Rainbow is a 1982 children's historical novel by Phyllis Piddington about an English family who emigrated to Australia in 1837.

It is Piddington’s only novel, written at the age of 72, thirteen years after her retirement from teaching. Although the book had limited circulation, it was adapted into the animated series Lucy-May of the Southern Rainbow even before its publication, which became significantly more popular.

== Plot ==
=== Part I – Holdfast Bay 1837 ===
In 1837, the seven-member Popple family emigrated from Yorkshire to the newly established colony of South Australia. Hoping for a better life and a larger farm, they endure a voyage of over three months before landing at Holdfast Bay. While waiting for transport to Adelaide, they live in tents along the coast. Father Arthur and his 12-year-old son Ben travel ahead to inspect the land granted to them, leaving mother Annie with their daughters Clara (16), Kate (10), Lucy May (7), and youngest son Tob in the temporary settlement.

Arthur later decides to sell their prefabricated English house and buy an unfinished one in Adelaide, reasoning that moving their belongings inland would be too costly. During this time, the girls explore the nearby beach with their friend Billie Jamling, experience a sudden storm, and narrowly avoid disaster. Meanwhile, Arthur and Ben help salvage cargo from their wrecked ship, encountering drunken sailors and laborers in rough frontier conditions. John, a sailor who had taken care of the Popple family and become their friend, bids farewell to Clara before leaving, telling her that he plans to settle in Australia with his brother.

One day, Lucy May and Kate rescue a trapped goat, which they name Sticky, and bring it back as a pet. Ben gets into a fight with a laborer named Bill while guarding the family’s luggage, but earns the sailors’ respect for his courage. The Popples finally load their possessions onto a wagon and begin their difficult journey to Adelaide, leaving Ben behind to watch over what remains.

Along the road, Clara, Kate, and Lucy May encounter other settler families struggling with broken carts and dead oxen, revealing the hardships faced by early immigrants. Lucy May remembers her little sister Annabel, who died of fever during the voyage. After losing their way in the forest, the girls discover a shepherd who directs them toward Adelaide. Following his instructions, they reach Park Lands, where they finally find their new home marked by Arthur’s necktie on the door. The building turns out to be a small, crude mud hut with a thatched roof — far from the dream they had imagined in England. Overcome by emotion, the girls burst into tears.

=== Part II – Adelaide 1837 ===
The Popple family is welcomed by Mrs. Mac, a kind shopkeeper who provides them with food and water. Exhausted, Lucy May, Kate, and Clara fall asleep near their new home. Later, Arthur and Annie arrive with the rest of the belongings as a storm begins. That night, the family is startled by noises, only to find it is Ben returning late after helping at a camp. The next morning, Lucy May and Kate explore the area and play in a nearby river, where they meet Charlie, a man who sells water. After he leaves, they overhear Indigenous children playing but decide to return home, recalling their father’s warning to stay away from the natives. At home, the girls help with chores such as making candles from fat. They witness the birth of Sticky’s kids and meet both Charlie and an Aboriginal woman seeking food. Annie shows kindness by offering her bread and tea and tells the children to always share with those in need.

An old acquaintance, Parker, arrives with furniture and shares news about his new carting business. Life gradually stabilizes, though land disputes grow as immigration increases. Lucy May secretly watches Aboriginal children playing and decides to keep it a secret. The children attend Sunday school and practice Bible recitations. One day, the Aboriginal woman returns with watercress as a gift; Annie gratefully brews it into tea, reflecting growing mutual respect.

Arthur begins building an adobe room, with Lucy May and Kate helping playfully while Ben supervises. Ben later assists with digging a well and feels overworked, wishing to study surgery or join a surveying team, but Arthur dismisses the idea.

One day, Kate and Lucy May lose a kite beyond the river, an area they are forbidden to enter as it is Aboriginal territory. The girls ask Billie and his friends for help in searching for it, but the kite is lodged in a tree that is too tall to reach. They eventually abandon the search, yet the boys manage to persuade the two sisters to venture into Aboriginal territory and observe a corroboree from a distance. Upon their return, the girls are severely punished by Arthur, who whips them with a strap.

Ben befriends the shepherd Long and helps care for sheep. Kate, curious and adventurous, gets lost while exploring but is rescued by Long. Later, Ben encounters Bill, a man who once fought him, and narrowly escapes harm with the help of his dog, Rover. Ben discovers an ill shepherd named Dan, tends to him, and receives a lamb and a Latin grammar book before Dan’s death. When Ben returns home with the lamb, the family rejoices. They name it Snowflake, and Annie and Arthur announce their plan to move to a stone house on Angas Street, celebrating with tea and prayers for their future farm.

=== Part III – Adelaide 1840 ===
Four years after settling in Adelaide, the Popple family lives in the stone house on Angas Street. The town has grown, Arthur is frustrated by his inability to purchase a farm, while Ben works at the port customs office and studies in his spare time. Clara works at Mrs. Mac’s bakery, and John has returned to Adelaide with his younger brother, now working as a carpenter. Clara and John are engaged, and Kate helps her mother and cares for her younger siblings, including the newly born Adam, who is two years old. Lucy May witnesses a public auction in the streets, where people sell belongings to survive. The family’s lamb, Snowflake, is sold, but John explains to Lucy May and Kate that Arthur reluctantly needed the money, calming their distress.

The children assist with household chores, farming, and errands. Arthur and John argue over letting Clara go to the theater, which Arthur deems inappropriate. Ben tries to intervene, but Arthur refuses, and Clara runs out crying, followed by John, after telling Arthur that his attitude is hardly tolerant. Lucy May finds a shilling in the grass and decides to use it to buy something useful for their farm. At the market, she purchases a broken wooden plow and, with Billie’s help, drags it home. A gentleman named Princeton passes by and helps attach it to a cart. Arthur scolds Lucy May for the damaged plow, and she cries, hoping to get their farm sooner. Princeton offers to repair the plow, and Arthur invites him in to discuss farming over tea. Princeton praises Arthur’s sound agricultural knowledge before leaving.

Arthur and Princeton decided to go to Mount Barker, where Princeton owned land, to inspect the land and discuss farming. Princeton also ran a lumber business there. They also decided to take the children on a picnic to the Tiers, borrowing a wagon from Princeton. Ben assists with oxen and transport, while Lucy May, Kate, and Tob participate in various tasks. Meanwhile, Arthur begins working in the Glen Osmond mines. During an outing, Adam falls into a hidden pit and dies, shocking the family. The children, especially Lucy May and Kate, feel guilt, and Clara comforts them.

The children help harvest barley at Princeton’s fields, learning labor-intensive tasks while interacting with peers. Arthur’s agricultural skills gain recognition from Princeton, who offers him an opportunity to manage part of his land, paving the way for the family’s future farm. Arthur secures a portion of Princeton’s land for the family, and John and Clara prepare to marry. The Popples move to their new farm shortly after Christmas, establishing a stone house with outbuildings. The family celebrates Clara and John’s New Year’s wedding, marking the start of a prosperous and hopeful chapter in their lives.

== Publication and adaptation ==
The novel was first serialized in an Australian family magazine before being published in book form in 1982 by Oxford University Press in Melbourne, with illustrations by Noela Young. A paperback edition was published in 1984.

Before its original serialization was completed, the work was adapted by Nippon Animation into a 50-episode anime series, Lucy-May of the Southern Rainbow, after being optioned at the Bologna Children's Book Fair. It was broadcast on Fuji TV as part of the World Masterpiece Theater staple, from January 10 to December 26, 1982. Around the time the broadcast began, a Japanese translation of the novel by Harue Ichinose was serialized in the Living Book magazine, published by Sankei Shimbun, and later released in book form in the Kodansha Cecile Bunko series on June 17, 1982.

It was published in Swedish by Liber in 1985.
