= Paul St. Peter =

American actor

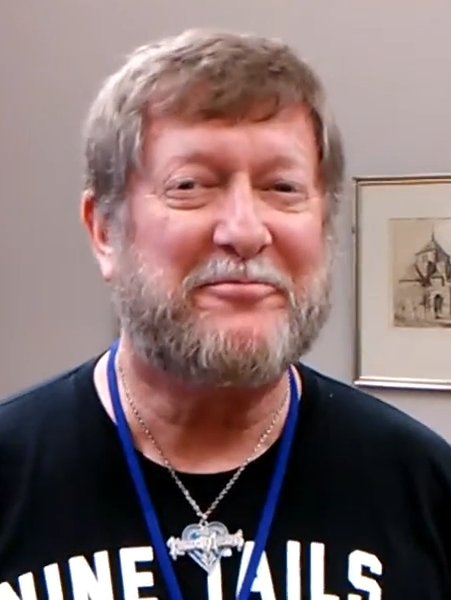
- St. Peter in 2018
- Born: Minneapolis, Minnesota, U.S.
- Occupation: Voice actor
- Years active: 1985–present

Paul St. Peter is an American voice actor, who works on English-language productions of Japanese anime shows. He voiced Punch in Cowboy Bebop: The Movie, Mondego in Gankutsuou: The Count of Monte Cristo, Kurama in Naruto, Razor in Hunter × Hunter, Yammy in Bleach, Jorgun in Gurren Lagann, and Higa in Durarara!!, and can be heard as various Digimon (the most recognized being Leomon, Wormmon and Diaboromon). Some of his notable roles in video games include Xemnas in the Kingdom Hearts series and Yuan Shao in Dynasty Warriors.

== Filmography ==
=== Anime ===
List of English dubbing performances in anime
Year	Title	Role	Notes	Source
1985	Robotech: The Masters	Zor Prime		
1985	Robotech: New Generation	Hose, Spider		
1997	Armitage III: Poly-Matrix	Additional voices	OVA	
1998	Battle Athletes	Narrator	As George C. Cole	
1998	Fushigi Yûgi	Gossiping Townsman, Voice in the Light	As George C. Cole	
1998	Giant Robo	Insp. Kenji Murasame, Prof. Kusama	As George C. Cole	
1998	Mobile Suit Gundam 0083: Stardust Memory	South Burning	As George C. Cole	
1999	Cowboy Bebop	Punch, Cop, Mark Rather, Computer Voice	As George C. Cole	
1999	Digimon Adventure	Leomon, SaberLeomon, Apocalymon, Kiwimon		
1999	Mobile Suit Gundam 0080: War in the Pocket	Mischa	As George C. Cole	
1999	Mobile Suit Gundam 0083: Stardust Memory	Lt. Burning	As George C. Cole	
1999	Outlaw Star	Various characters	As George C. Cole	
2000	Arc the Lad	Gorgon, Quote, Soldiers	As George C. Cole	
2000	Digimon Adventure 02	Wormmon, Stingmon, Paildramon, Imperialdramon, Tapirmon		
2000	Trigun	Loose Ruth, Bartender, others	As George C. Cole	
2001	Digimon Tamers	Leomon, Gorillamon, Prof. Tetsuo Uchiharato		
2001	Pilot Candidate	Dr. Crow Revoard	As George C. Cole	
2001	Saint Tail	Mizutani		
2001	Samurai: Hunt for the Sword	Ninjas, Officer, Courier	As George C. Cole	
2001–02	Rurouni Kenshin	Saizuchi, Kurojo, Tsukoi, various characters	As George C. Cole	
2002	Digimon Frontier	Cherubimon, Mr. Minamoto, Mushroomon, IceLeomon, Monzaemon, WaruMonzaemon		
2002	éX-Driver	Doctor, Todo Thug C	As George C. Cole	
2002	Tsukikage Ran	Kikuhimeya Henchman		
2002	X	Priest	As George C. Cole	
2003	Argento Soma	MORGUE Officer		
2003	Gun Frontier	Postman, Mayor, Ahonenn, Toilet Man, Gunman, Man A	As George C. Cole	
2003	Heat Guy J	Edmundo's Boss, Rhine	As George C. Cole	
2003	Last Exile	Hurricane Hawk, Guild Watcher #1, Claimh-Solais Gunner, Campbell, others	As George C. Cole	
2003	s-CRY-ed	Biff, others		
2003	Witch Hunter Robin	Kiyoshi Matsunaga; Police Commissioner; Chisai's Underling; Hiroshi Honma		
2004	Burn-Up Scramble	Mowhawk Robber; Bartender; Bazooka Mercenary; Head Guard	As Francis C. Cole	
2004	Hajime no Ippo	Haruhiko Yagi, Miyata's Father	As George C. Cole	
2004	Gad Guard	Bob Ashkenazi, Karakida Boss, various	As George C. Cole	
2004	Ghost in the Shell: Stand Alone Complex	Imakurusu		
2004	Gungrave	Nyman; Bodyguard	As Francis C. Cole	
2004	Kikaider 01	Shadow Underling	OVA	
2004	Rave Master	Fura		
2004	Space Pirate Captain Herlock	Sabu	As George C. Cole	
2004	Stellvia	Various characters	As George C. Cole	
2004	Submarine 707R	Commodore	As George C. Cole	
2004	Battle B-Daman	Armada, Marda B		
2004	The Twelve Kingdoms	Kantai	As George C. Cole	
2004–05	Monster	Dr. Julius Reichwein		
2005	Grenadier	Shop Owner; Gate Keeper; Restaurant Owner	As Francis C. Cole	
2005	Black Jack	Doctor, Train Announcement	As George C. Cole	
2005	Gankutsuou: The Count of Monte Cristo	Fernand de Morcerf; Chauffeur	As Francis C. Cole	
2005	Mars Daybreak	OD Pirate; Ship Cook		
2005	New Getter Robo	Zochoten, Kintoki Sakata, Bandit, Lab Staff	As Francis C. Cole	
2005	Otogizoshi	Tabigeinin A	As George C. Cole	
2005	Overman King Gainer	Shinjin	As George C. Cole	
2005	Planetes	Gigalt Gangaragash		
2005	Saiyuki Reload	Dokugakuji, Thug A	As Francis C. Cole	
2005	Samurai Champloo	Various characters	As Francis C. Cole	
2005	Tenjho Tenge	Sagara	As George C. Cole	
2006	Karas: The Prophecy	Wanyudo		
2006	Saiyuki Reload Gunlock	Dokugakuji; Monster; Villager	As Francis C. Cole	
2007	Flag	1st Lt. Jan Nikkanen	As George C. Cole	
2007	Gurren Lagann	Jorgun		
2007	Tales of Phantasia	Dozo, Official, Bar Patron, General	As George C. Cole	
2008	Strait Jacket	Brian Meno Moderato		
2015	JoJo's Bizarre Adventure	Jack the Ripper, Dire, Wamuu		
2016	Hunter × Hunter	Todo, Razor	2011 series As George C. Cole	
2016	One-Punch Man	Beast King (ep 2), Subterraneans (ep 1)	As George C. Cole	
2017	Dragon Ball Super	Sorbet	Toonami Asia dub	
2019	Boruto: Naruto Next Generations	Kurama		
2021	Yashahime: Princess Half-Demon	Tōtetsu		
2022	Lycoris Recoil	Itadori, Yamadera		
2023	Pluto	Principal Ban		

- 009 Re:Cyborg – Dr. Issac Gilmore
- Bleach – Grand Fisher, Yammy Riyalgo
- Bobobo-bo Bo-bobo – Captain Battleship, Roman Samurai, Bebebe-be Be-bebe, Dark Yasha
- Cowboy Bebop – Punch, Mark Rather, Cop
- Digimon Data Squad – Keramon/Kurisarimon (8), SaberLeomon, MetalPhantomon (15)
- Durarara!! – Anri's Father, Higa
- Edens Zero – Captain Connor
- Gankutsuou – Fernand de Morcerf
- Heat Guy J – Rhine
- Kekkaishi – Koya
- Last Exile – Arthur Campbell
- The Mystery of Mamo – Howard Lockewood/Mamo
- Mobile Suit Gundam 0080: War in the Pocket – Mikhail Kaminsky
- Naruto – Kurama, Jirocho Wasabi, Koumei
- Naruto Shippuden – Kurama
- One Piece – Rocks D. Xebec
- Overman King Gainer – Shinjin
- Rurouni Kenshin – Saizuchi
- Saiyuki Reload – Dokugakuji
- Saiyuki Reload Gunlock – Dokugakuji
- Samurai Champloo – Bundai (Ep. 18)
- Shinzo – King Daku, Additional Voices
- Superior Defender Gundam Force – Tallgeese, Gun Bike, Gundiver-01, Zakrello Gate
- Stitch! – Leroy
- Time of Eve – Shimei
- Twelve Kingdoms – Kantai
- Witch Hunter Robin – Hiroshi Honma, Kiyoshi Matsunaga
- Zetman – Dr. Sugita (as George C. Cole)

=== Animation ===
List of voice performances in televisions
Year	Title	Role	Notes	Source
2005	What's New, Scooby-Doo?	Chinese Dragon		
2010	Firebreather	Abbadon/Dragon #2 (uncredited)		
2015-present	Miraculous: Tales of Ladybug & Cat Noir	Master Wang Fu	Seasons 2-5	
2020-present	Animaniacs	TBA		

=== Film ===
List of voice performances in direct-to-video and television films
Year	Title	Role	Notes	Source
1996	They Were 11	Narrator, Doctor	As George C. Cole	
1999	Black Jack the Movie	Dr. Takemoto	Animaze dub	
1999	Mobile Suit Gundam	White Base Fed 3	As George C. Cole	
1999	Perfect Blue	News Reporter	As George C. Cole	
2000	The Castle of Cagliostro	French Councilman	As George C. Cole	
2000	The Dog of Flanders	Art Judge	1997 film	
2001	Akira	Takashi Crowd Soldier 2, Councilman 6, Nurse's Guard 1, Man Declaring Akira's Return, Interrogator 2	As George C. Cole	
2001	Zeiram 2	Taguchi, Kanuut	live-action dub As George C. Cole	
2003	Cowboy Bebop: The Movie	Mark Rather, Punch		
2003	Lupin the 3rd: The Secret of Mamo	Howard 'Mamo' Lockewood	As George C. Cole	
2004	Mobile Suit Gundam F91	Nanto Roos, others	As George C. Cole	
2005	Digimon Adventure 02: Revenge of Diaboromon	Wormmon, Stingmon, Paildramon, Imperialdramon, Diaboromon, Armageddemon		
2006	Patlabor	Det. Matsui, Superintendent Kaihou	As George C. Cole	
2006	Patlabor 2	Det. Matsui, Superintendent Kaihou	As George C. Cole	
2007	Paprika	Det. Toshimi Konakawa	As George C. Cole	
2017	Digimon Adventure tri.: Determination	Leomon	Uncredited	
2019	Godzilla: The Planet Eater	Takeshi J. Hamamoto	Netflix	
2020	Digimon Adventure: Last Evolution Kizuna	Wormmon, Stingmon		
2024	Digimon Adventure: Our War Game!	Keramon, Infermon, Diaboromon	Discotek Media/Sound Cadence Studios dub	
2024	Digimon Adventure 02: Hurricane Touchdown	Wendigomon, Cherubimon	Discotek Media/Sound Cadence Studios dub	

List of voice performances in feature films
Year	Title	Role	Notes	Source
2000	Digimon: The Movie	Keramon, Infermon, Diaboromon, Kokomon		
2021	Violet Evergarden: The Movie	Additional Cast		
2023	Ladybug & Cat Noir: The Movie	Master Wang Fu		

=== Live action ===
- Adventures in Voice Acting – Himself
- Icons – Himself (ep 119)
- Power Rangers: Zeo – Tritor (voice, uncredited)
- Stick it in Me – The Transvestite
- Tim And Eric Awesome Show, Great Job
- Versus – Jacket

=== Video games ===
List of voice performances in video games
Year	Title	Role	Notes	Source
2002	Digimon Rumble Arena	Wormmon, Stingmon, Imperialdramon		
2003	Dynasty Warriors 4	Yuan Shao		
2006	Kingdom Hearts II	Xemnas		
2006	Dirge of Cerberus: Final Fantasy VII	Incidental characters		
2008	Star Ocean: First Departure	Jie Revorse	Reused recorded voice lines in Star Ocean: First Departure R	
2009	Resident Evil 5	Swahili Zombie		
2009	Kingdom Hearts 358/2 Days	Xemnas		
2010	Naruto Shippuden: Ultimate Ninja Storm 2	The Nine-Tails		
2010	World of Warcraft: Cataclysm	Boden the Imposing		
2011	Naruto Shippuden: Ultimate Ninja Impact	The Nine-Tails		
2012	Soulcalibur V	Narrator	Grouped under English Voices	
2012	Kingdom Hearts 3D: Dream Drop Distance	Xemnas		
2012	Diablo III	Demented Spirit	Grouped under Additional Voices	
2013	Naruto Shippuden: Ultimate Ninja Storm 3	Nine-Tails (Kurama)		
2013	Kingdom Hearts HD 1.5 ReMIX	Xemnas	358/2 Days HD cutscenes archive and new footage	
2014	Naruto Shippuden: Ultimate Ninja Storm Revolution	Nine-Tails (Kurama)		
2014	Kingdom Hearts HD 2.5 ReMIX	Xemnas	II: Final Mix HD cutscenes archive and new footage	
2014	Drakengard 3	Michael		
2016	Naruto Shippuden: Ultimate Ninja Storm 4	Nine-Tails (Kurama)		
2017	Kingdom Hearts HD 2.8 Final Chapter Prologue	Xemnas	Dream Drop Distance HD archived footage	
2017	Kingdom Hearts HD 1.5 + 2.5 Remix	Xemnas	358/2 Days and II: Final Mix HD cutscenes archived footage	
2018	Soulcalibur VI	Announcer		
2019	Kingdom Hearts III	Xemnas		
2019	Fire Emblem: Three Houses	Ionius IX		
2019	Daemon X Machina	Knight		
2020	Kingdom Hearts III Re Mind	Xemnas	DLC archive and new footage	
2024	Romancing SaGa 2: Revenge of the Seven	Sekishusai		
2026	Final Fantasy Resonance	Veritas of the Flame		

- Baten Kaitos Origins – Nollin
- Bleach: The 3rd Phantom – Yammy Riyalgo
- Diablo III: Reaper of Souls – Additional Voices
- Digimon All-Star Rumble – Wormmon/Stingmon, Imperialdramon Fighter Mode
- Digimon World Data Squad – Barbamon, Leviamon, Ravemon
- Drakengard 3 – Michael
- Fire Emblem Heroes – Gregor
- Kingdom Hearts HD 1.5 Remix – Xemnas
- Kingdom Hearts HD 2.5 Remix – Xemnas
- Majin and the Forsaken Kingdom – Majin Taotl
- Mortal Kombat vs. DC Universe – Narrator
- Mortal Kombat: Armageddon – Taven, Havik, Nightwolf
- Mortal Kombat: Deception – Havik, Nightwolf, Hotaru
- Soulcalibur V
