= Patlabor: The New Files =

Japanese original video animation (OVA) series

- Cover of the first volume of the DVD release of Patlabor: The New Files

機動警察パトレイバー2 (Kidō Keisatsu Patoreibaa Tsū)
- Genre: Comedy, Mecha, Police
- Original video animation
- Directed by: Naoyuki Yoshinaga
- Written by: Kazunori Itō
- Music by: Kenji Kawai
- Studio: Sunrise
- Licensed by: AUS: Madman Entertainment; NA: Central Park Media (former) Maiden Japan (former) Discotek Media (current); UK: MVM Entertainment
- Released: November 22, 1990 – April 23, 1992
- Episodes: 16

Patlabor: The New Files, known in Japan as Patlabor the Mobile Police 2 (機動警察パトレイバー2), is a Japanese original video animation series based on the Patlabor anime franchise. These episodes take place at several points between episodes of Patlabor: The TV Series and after the latter's final episode. The OVA episodes also feature the conclusion of the Griffon story arc.

== Plot ==
Four episodes of The New Files series serve as the finale for the Griffin arc of the television series. The rest of the series mainly consists of side stories that take place during or after the TV show.

== Episodes ==
The episodes were released as OVAs alongside the TV series on Laserdisc and VHS from Bandai Visual from November 22, 1990, to June 6, 1992. They were later released on DVD on August 25, 2000, and on Blu-ray on September 24, 2010. Central Park Media licensed the New Files series and released them on subtitled VHS under the U.S. Manga Corps label. They later released one DVD volume with English audio before releasing a box set containing all 16 episodes. Only four (Note: Episodes 1, 2, 3, & 5.) episodes of the series were dubbed; the rest were subtitled only. Maiden Japan has relicensed the OVA series, and released the series on Blu-ray and DVD on February 17, 2015. All of the episodes were included in the Patlabor the Mobile Police - Complete Collection boxset also released by Maiden Japan on 6 January 2019.
