= Lucy-May of the Southern Rainbow =

Japanese anime television series

- Cover art from the re-edited footage film DVD release
- 南の虹のルーシー
- Genre: Historical drama, adventure
- Based on: Southern Rainbow by Phyllis Piddington
- Written by: Akira Miyazaki
- Directed by: Hiroshi Saitô
- Music by: Kōichi Sakata
- Country of origin: Japan
- Original language: Japanese
- No. of episodes: 50

Production
- Executive producer: Kōichi Motohashi
- Producer: Takaji Matsudo
- Production companies: Nippon Animation; Fuji Television

Original release
- Network: FNS (Fuji TV)
- Release: 10 January – 26 December 1982

Lucy-May of the Southern Rainbow (南の虹のルーシー, Minami no Niji no Rūshī; "Lucy of the Southern Rainbow") is a Japanese anime series by Nippon Animation. This 1982 adaptation is part of the studio's World Masterpiece Theater franchise, based on the 1982 novel Southern Rainbow by Australian writer Phyllis Piddington. The anime has been dubbed into French, Italian, Arabic, Spanish, German, Thai and Persian.

== Plot ==
Set in the 1830s, the series tells the story of a young girl named Lucy and the hardships and excitement she and her family encounter when they move from England to Adelaide in South Australia to start a farm.

== Cast and characters ==
=== Popple family ===
- Minori Matsushima as Lucy-May Popple - the 7-year-old main character.
- Rihoko Yoshida as Kate Popple - Lucy-May's 10-year-old sister, she serves as narrator of the series.
- Sakiko Ikeda as Clara Popple - Lucy-May's 16-year-old sister and eldest sibling.
- Tatsuya Matsuda as Ben Popple - Lucy-May's 12-year-old brother.
- Teiyū Ichiryūsai and Yumi Takada as Tob Popple - Lucy-May's 2-year-old brother and youngest sibling.
- Katsunosuke Hori as Arthur Popple - Lucy-May's father.
- Ikuko Tani as Annie Popple - Lucy-May's mother.
- Marsh - Lucy-May's pet hamster.
- Little - Lucy-May's pet dingo.

=== Others ===
- Mie Suzuki as Billie Jamling - a 10-year-old boy who is friends with Kate and Lucy-May.
- Tetsuo Mizutori as Mr. Jamling - Billie's father, a carpenter who is also a friend of the Popples
- Junpei Takiguchi as Mr. Pettiwell - a wealthy businessman who came on the same ship as the Popples.
- Happy - Mr. Pettiwell's dog.
- Hiroshi Masuoka as Mr. Parker - a friend of Popple family.
- Kazuhiko Inoue as John - a young sailor with a crush on Clara.
- Chikako Akimoto as Jane Mac - a kind neighbor of the Popples.
- Rokurō Naya as Bernard - Jane's brother, who works in Colonel Light's office
- Kimie Nakajima and Takashi Yasuda as Mary and Fred - aunt and uncle of Lucy-May who live with Arthur's mother in Yorkshire, England.
- Miyoko Asō as Grandmother - mother of Arthur and Mary.
- Toshihiko Kojima as Frank Princeton - a wealthy landowner who helps Lucy-May after an accident.
- Akiko Tsuboi as Sylvia Princeton - Frank's wife, who becomes morbidly attached to Lucy-May who reminds her of her deceased daughter.

== Production ==
Not only it is the first anime in the World Masterpiece Theater to have been broadcast while the author of the source material was still alive (followed by Story of the Alps: My Annette, The Bush Baby and Kon'nichiwa Anne: Before Green Gables), but it also is the only one to have aired when the original work wasn't finished yet. At the time of the broadcasting in Japan in 1982, Southern Rainbow was still in phase of serialization on an Australian family daily magazine, prior to be published as a book later that same year. Another adaptation of the story, written by Ken Wakasaki as a tie-in to the anime, was also published in Japan in 1982.

== Episodes ==
1. To a New land
2. Cute Fellow
3. The Replacement
4. First Exploration
5. After the Rain
6. A Town Named Adelaide
7. Ben's Misfortune
8. Night Before Departure
9. Road to Adelaide
10. Green Town
11. My Small House
12. Night at Adelaide
13. Ben Has Arrived
14. A Stout Man
15. Two Homes
16. Drenched Doctor
17. Unfortunate Accident
18. Tree Climbing
19. Shopping Tine
20. Water in the Well
21. Adelaide's Designer
22. Children of Brick and Dingo
23. Your Name is Little
24. The Day Which Marks The End Of Summer
25. When I'm Not Brought Along
26. I Got Sick!
27. Ride on the Wind
28. Land Opposite the River
29. Little's Training
30. Birthday Present
31. Little and Black Dog
32. Bridge over the Rainbow
33. Lost Dream
34. Little and School
35. Duel
36. Five Shillings in the Nest
37. Bandits of the Grassland
38. Detective Lucy
39. Two Farewells
40. Who Am I?
41. A Town I Do Not Know, A Person I Do Not Recognize
42. A Child Called Emily
43. Missing Each Other
44. Little! Little!
45. Tob's Vanished
46. A Wombat In The Hole
47. Father's Decision
48. Rich Child
49. Clara's Marriage
50. Toward's the Rainbow

== Music ==
- Opening theme: "Niji ni Naritai" by Sumiko Yamagata
- Ending theme: "Mori ni Oide" by Sumiko Yamagata
