= Tohokushinsha Film =

Japanese film distributor & production company

Tohokushinsha Film Corporation

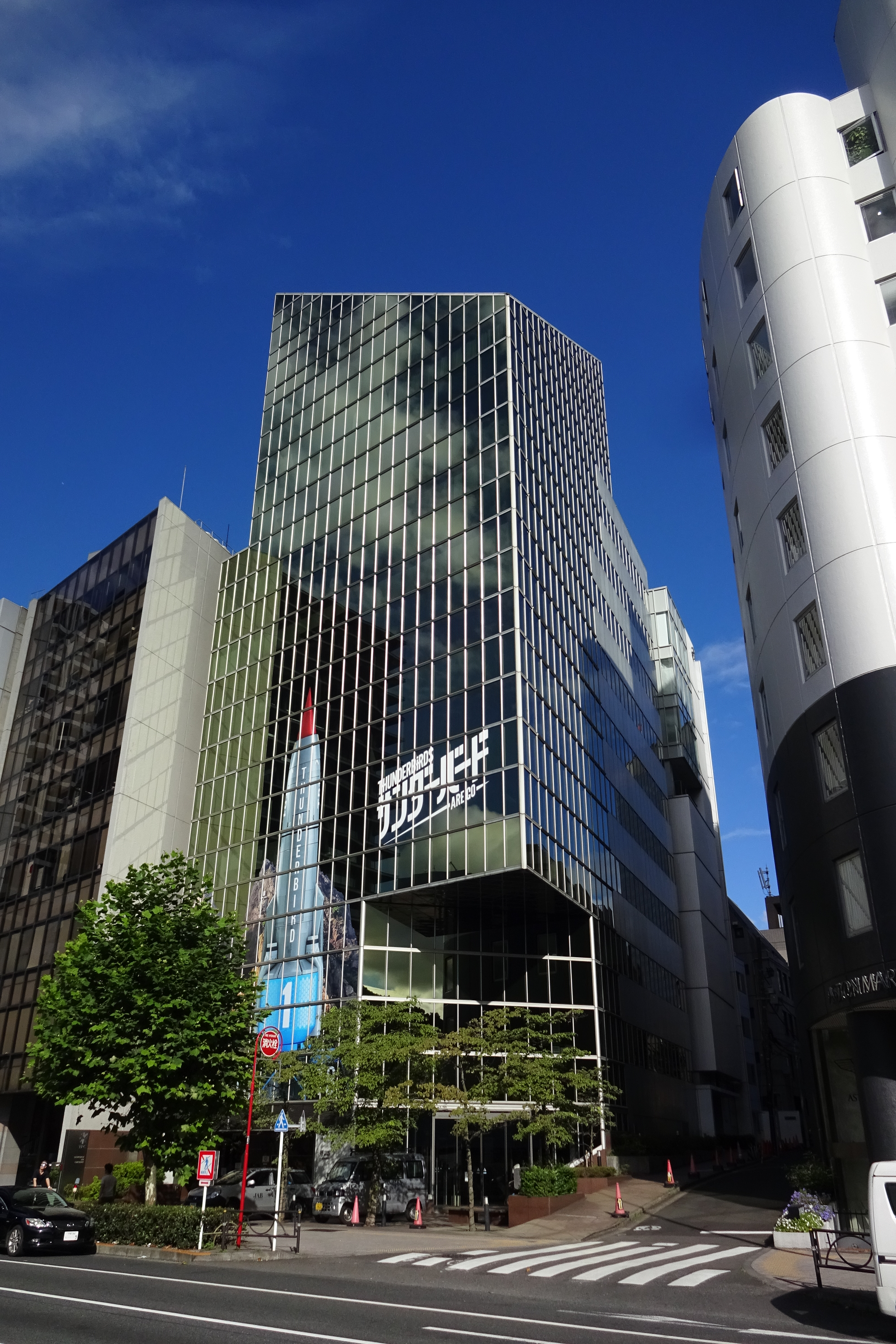
- Headquarters in Minato, Tokyo
- Native name: 株式会社東北新社
- Romanized name: Kabushiki gaisha Tōhokushinsha
- Type: Public family-controlled KK
- Traded as: TYO: 2329; NAG: 2329
- ISIN: 3010401015790
- Industry: Film distribution, production company, dubbing studio
- Predecessor: Hitachi Pictures; Hitachi Records
- Founded: April 1, 1961; 65 years ago
- Founder: Banjirō Uemura
- Headquarters: Akasaka, Minato, Tokyo, Japan
- Key people: Keiichi Kosaka (Representative Director and President)
- Owner: Hisako Uemura (21.61%); Ryo Uermura (16.33%)
- Website: tfc.co.jp

Tohokushinsha Film Corporation (株式会社東北新社, Kabushiki gaisha Tōhokushinsha) is a Japanese film distributor, production company and dubbing studio based in Akasaka, Minato, Tokyo. It was founded in 1961 by Banjirō Uemura (who was also once the head of the Japanese branch of ITC Entertainment) as a dubbing house for foreign films; members of the Uemura family continue as its largest shareholders.

The company name "Tohokushinsha" comes from the Shiki Theatre Company, which was made by founder Uemura from Higashitakizawa Village.

== History ==
On April 6, 1961, Banjirō Uemura established the company following the split of Tohoku Publishing and transferred the company, which continue to dub and license foreign television films into Japanese.

In 1971, Tokohushinsha started the video editing and post-production business. It later acquired shares of National Bussan, a supermarket operator in Azabu. In partnership with Nippon Sunrise, they established the anime and film production conglomerate Shōeisha (later Cente Studio) to handle anime production.

In 1976, Tohokushinsha broke down after a conflict with Nippon Sunrise, which the company had spun off into a fully-owned Nippon Sunrise, Inc. (now Bandai Namco Filmworks), changing its name.

In 1984, Tohokushinsha started the CG production business.

== Anime ==
- Adventures of the Little Koala
- Aikatsu Planet!
- Amon Saga
- Appleseed
- Assemble Insert
- Brave Raideen
- Garo series
- Gundam Reconguista in G
- Lupin III: The Castle of Cagliostro
- Lupin the 3rd: The Mystery of Mamo
- Lupin III: Bye Bye, Lady Liberty
- Lupin III: Green vs. Red
- Mr Locomotive
- Mobile Suit Gundam Unicorn RE:00096
- Mary and the Witch's Flower
- Mai Mai Miracle
- New Tetsujin-28
- Paranoia Agent
- Patlabor
  - Patlabor: The Movie
  - Patlabor 2: The Movie
  - WXIII: Patlabor the Movie 3
- Ray the Animation
- Saikano
  - Saikano: Another Love Song
- Sherlock Hound
- Spirited Away
- Space Adventure Cobra: The Movie
- Tachiguishi-Retsuden
- Tetsuko no Tabi
- Tweeny Witches
- The Wind Rises
- Windy Tales

== Films ==
- Aikatsu Planet! The Movie
- Fine, Totally Fine
- Hasami Otoko
- Lost in Translation
- Lovely Complex
- Marie Antoinette (distributed for Japanese release)
- Message from Space (with Toei Company)
- Mechanical Violator Hakaider (with Toei Company)
- Onmyoji
  - Onmyoji 2
- Shark Skin Man and Peach Hip Girl
- Somewhere (distributed for Japanese release)

== Games ==
- Crash Bandicoot 2: Cortex Strikes Back
- Crash Nitro Kart
- Dark Cloud
- Final Fantasy XV
- Final Fantasy XVI
- Ico
- Kinect Disneyland Adventures
- The Last Guardian
- Lupin the 3rd: Treasure of the Sorcerer King
- Mister Mosquito
- Ni No Kuni: Wrath of the White Witch
- Novastorm
- Shadow of the Colossus
- Soulcalibur IV
- Sonic Generations
- Sonic Adventure DX: Director's Cut
- Soulcalibur Legends
- SkyGunner
- Metal Gear Solid 4: Guns of the Patriots
- Ultraman Powered
- Sonic The Hedgehog (2006)

== Live-action series ==
- GARO
- Aikatsu Planet!
