= Patlabor: The TV Series =

Japanese anime television series

- Patlabor: The TV Series first DVD cover
- 機動警察パトレイバー ON TELEVISION
- Genre: Action, comedy, police drama
- Created by: Headgear
- Directed by: Naoyuki Yoshinaga
- Series composition: Hiroyuki Hoshiyama
- Music by: Kenji Kawai
- No. of episodes: 47 (list of episodes)

Production
- Studio: Sunrise
- Producers: Toru Horikoshi (NTV); Kiyoshi Ishikawa (Yomiko); Shin Unosawa (Bandai); Taro Maki (Tohokushinsha); Toru Horikoshi (Tohokushinsha); Eiji Sashida (Sunrise)
- Production companies: Bandai; Tohokushinsha

Original release
- Network: NTV
- Release: October 11, 1989 – September 29, 1990

Patlabor: The TV Series, known in Japan as Patlabor the Mobile Police on Television (機動警察パトレイバー ON TELEVISION), is a 1989–1990 anime television series. It was created by Headgear, animated by Sunrise, and based on the Patlabor anime franchise. The story focuses on Second Special Vehicles Division (SV2), a group of Patlabor policemen who fight and investigate crimes. The TV series is an alternate timeline to the original Patlabor OVAs and films, with an all-new origin story.

== Development ==
The television series was animated by Sunrise and was directed by Naoyuki Yoshinaga.

With the success of the first movie, Patlabor became one of the first OVAs to be adapted to TV. Originally planned for 24 episodes, (up to the end of Kanuka's practicum at SV2), the series was extended twice. First to 36 episodes, to cover the conflict with Schaft, and then to 47 episodes in order to conclude the series. Later in the story, Kanuka Clancy leaves and a new character is introduced in Takeo Kumagami, a character originally shown in the manga, episodes 26 through 35 even being more closely based on the manga. The Patlabor: The New Files OVAs are a follow-up to the series.

At the request of the sponsor, toy manufacturer Bandai, the TV series was to include some action with labors. (Labors are the heavy construction equipment after which this series is named.) However, the toys made for the series did not sell as well as expected.

In the original broadcast, the labors were making more metallic "kshang!" sound, but were revised to motor whirring sound like that of the movie when the whole series was released on Laserdisc.

== Episodes ==
The 47 episodes aired on Nippon TV from October 11, 1989, to September 29, 1990.

== Home video ==
Bandai Visual has released the television series on Laserdisc, VHS, and DVD. Two Blu-ray box sets that contain two halves of the series were released on August 27, 2010 and September 24, 2010. Central Park Media released the series (under their U.S. Manga Corps label) on subtitled VHS from July 7, 1998, to February 8, 2000, spanning nine volumes. They later released two dubbed VHS volumes from August 14, 2001, to June 11, 2002, and later dropped the rest of the VHS releases. CPM also re-released the series on DVD, spanning 11 volumes and three box sets (with the 11th volume on the 3rd box set) from August 14, 2001, to August 9, 2005. All of the DVDs are now out of print. The English dub was produced at Matlin Recording in New York City, New York. Maiden Japan re-released the TV series in North America on July 16, 2013, on DVD and Blu-ray.

== Music themes ==
Opening themes

- "そのままの君でいて" (Sono mama no Kimi de ite - Please be as you were) by Yuko Nitou (episodes 1-34)
- "コンディション・グリーン～緊急発進～" (Condition Green ~Kinkyuu Hasshin~ - Emergency Launch) by Hiroko Kasahara (epìsodes 35-47)

Ending themes

- "ミッドナイト ブルー" (Midnight Blue) by KISS ME QUICK (episodes 1-34)
- "パラダイスの確率" (Paradise no Kakuritsu - Probability of Paradise) by JA-JA (episodes 35-47)
