= Patlabor =

Japanese media franchise

- Mobile Police Patlabor
- Manga volume 1 cover, featuring Noa Izumi

機動警察パトレイバー (Kidō Keisatsu Patoreibā)
- Genre: Action comedy; Mecha; Science fiction
- Created by: Headgear
- Manga
- Written by: Masami Yūki
- Published by: Shogakukan
- English publisher: NA: Viz Media (dropped)
- Imprint: Shōnen Sunday Comics
- Magazine: Weekly Shōnen Sunday
- Original run: March 23, 1988 – May 11, 1994
- Volumes: 22
- Original video animation

The Early Days
- Directed by: Mamoru Oshii
- Written by: Kazunori Itō
- Music by: Kenji Kawai
- Studio: Studio Deen
- Licensed by: AUS: Madman Entertainment; NA: Central Park Media (former); Maiden Japan (former); Discotek Media (current); UK: MVM Films
- Released: April 25, 1988 – June 25, 1989
- Episodes: 7
Further information
Light novel
Written by	Michiko Yokote
Published by	Fujimi Shobō
Imprint	Fujimi Fantasia Bunko
Original run	October 1990 – October 1993
Volumes	5
Light novel
Tokyo War
Written by	Mamoru Oshii
Published by	Fujimi Shobō
Imprint	Fujimi Fantasia Bunko
Original run	April 1994 – May 1994
Volumes	2
Original video animation
MiniPato
Directed by	Kenji Kamiyama
Written by	Mamoru Oshii
Music by	Kenji Kawai
Studio	Production I.G
Licensed by	AUS: Madman Entertainment; NA: Central Park Media (former); Maiden Japan (former); Discotek Media (current)
Released	March 30, 2002
Runtime	14 minutes (#1); 12 minutes (#2); 12 minutes (#3)
Original net animation
Reboot
Directed by	Yasuhiro Yoshiura
Written by	Yasuhiro Yoshiura; Kazunori Itō
Music by	Kenji Kawai
Studio	Studio Khara; Studio Rikka
Released	October 15, 2016
Runtime	7 minutes
- Movie timeline
- Patlabor: The Early Days; Patlabor: The Movie; Patlabor 2: The Movie; WXIII: Patlabor the Movie 3; The Next Generation: Patlabor
- TV timeline
- Patlabor: The TV Series; Patlabor: The New Files; Patlabor EZY
- icon

Mobile Police Patlabor (Japanese: 機動警察パトレイバー, Hepburn: Kidō Keisatsu Patoreibā), also known as Patlabor (a portmanteau of "patrol" and "labor"), is a Japanese science fiction media franchise in the mecha genre. It is produced by Headgear, an artist collective consisting of manga artist Masami Yūki, director Mamoru Oshii, screenwriter Kazunori Itō, mecha designer Yutaka Izubuchi, and character designer Akemi Takada. The concept of Patlabor originated from a desire to create a more realistic and light-hearted mecha anime than militarized works like Gundam or Space Runaway Ideon which were popular in the 1980s.

Set in near-future Tokyo, construction mecha known as "Labors" are increasingly used in large-scale engineering work; the Tokyo Metropolitan Police also have their own fleet of police Labors. Incorporating elements of the workplace comedy and police procedural genres, the series follows the misfit Division 2 as they deal with Labor-related crimes, terrorism, and accidents.

The franchise began airing in 1988 with the Patlabor: The Early Days OVA, and quickly became a multimedia franchise including a manga, three TV series, four feature-length movies, three light novel series, and an animated short film compilation. Patlabor is known for using mecha not just for police or military purposes, but also for industrial and municipal jobs.

== Plot ==
The story takes place in what was, at the time of release, the near future of 1998–2002. Mecha called "labors" are used in heavy construction work. The Tokyo Metropolitan Police has its own fleet of patrol Labors ("patlabors"; as opposed to patrol cars) to combat crimes or terrorism and deal with accidents involving labors. The story arcs usually revolve around Tokyo Metropolitan Police Special Vehicle Section 2, Division 2. Labor pilot Noa Izumi is the protagonist of the series, but all of Division 2 play roles. Detectives Hata and Kusumi are the main protagonists of the third Patlabor film.

Due to being released simultaneously, the manga, TV series, and feature films all take place in separate continuities. The movie timeline includes the Early Days OVA and the three animated Patlabor films. The TV timeline includes the original TV series as well as the New Files OVA. Masami Yūki's manga is separate from both, although some TV episodes and the third film draw their plots from it.

The Next Generation series and film take place in 2013, with an entirely new cast (except for Shige and Buchiyama in maintenance), but the new members of SV2 have similar names and personalities to the old ones. Some of its episodes reference the TV series, and the final episode and movie are a direct sequel to Patlabor 2.

The Patlabor EZY series is set in the TV timeline. Now set in the near future of 2033, Labors have become largely automated, and the Special Vehicles Section must continue to work as a Labor police force without becoming obsolete. Brash pilot Towa Kuga and her backup Kippei Atori are the protagonists, but, like the original series, the show features an ensemble cast of all Division 2.

== Production ==
Patlabor was originally produced by the artist collective known as Headgear, whose five members are Masami Yūki, Mamoru Oshii, Akemi Takada, Kazunori Itō, and Yutaka Izubuchi. Although their involvement varies between Patlabor projects (for instance, Oshii was largely uninvolved in creating Patlabor EZY), works belonging to Headgear split all their profits five ways regardless of contributions.

The concept originated with Yūki in the mid-1980s and was developed during low-stakes 'anime planning' sessions with friends like future Headgear member Akemi Takada. In response to grim, militarized mecha anime like Gundam and other shows directed by Yoshiyuki Tomino, Yūki began to conceptualize a more lighthearted type of mecha anime:

Instead of police cars, patrol robots roam around, firing giant revolver pistols left and right. However, no one dies (or if they do, it's not shown). It's not some exaggerated story about the fate of Earth or humanity, but a more grounded, realistic near-future story. A world where anything goes—monsters, mad scientists, master thieves, mystery, horror, action! But fundamentally, it's a story of a "local police officer," centering on the joys and sorrows of a civil servant ...

Yūki, Izubuchi, and writer Isao Hiura attempted to pitch the concept as a TV anime, with potential for toy manufacturer sponsorship: the main Labor would be a transforming police car or a combination of a police car and a mecha. Although the project was unable to find sponsorship then, it became more commercially feasible later in the decade with the expansion of the OVA format, which didn't require the same levels of sponsorship as TV features but carried lower risk than a full theatrical feature.

The original Mobile Police Patlabor series (renamed to Patlabor: The Early Days in 1995) was forced to make several creative decisions to keep costs low: the retail price was set at only 4,800 yen (rather than the 10,000 yen many other OVAs sold at) so as to recoup costs solely through video sales rather than relying on toy sponsorships, and only six episodes were produced rather than a standard 13-episode cour. (Note: After the OVA's success, a seventh episode was produced to hold audience attention until the movie's release.) Many of the action sequences which the Headgear members imagined for the Labors could not be realized then, although some were later produced in the TV series and films. Yūki's manga serialization, which began in Weekly Shōnen Sunday just a few weeks after the first OVA episode was released, was originally meant to serve as promotional material for the OVA; Patlabor's success meant it continued running for six years, until 1994.

After strong sales of the original OVA, Headgear produced the first Patlabor movie in 1989, directed by Oshii and marking the start of the franchise's work with animation studio Production I.G.. The same year, the TV series began airing, concluding in September 1990 after 47 episodes; a second OVA of 16 episodes, Patlabor: The New Files, was released in 1990 with the home video discs of the series. (Note: Produced by Sunrise studios, rather than Production I.G.) The second movie, released in 1993, was largely seen as a closure to the series.

The third movie, set chronologically between the first two movies, was originally conceived as an OVA before being produced by Madhouse as a full-length movie in 2002. Accompanying it in theaters was a series of shorts called Mini-Pato, using novel papercraft CGI to depict the characters and explain aspects of the world.

== Media ==
=== Manga ===
Released by Shogakukan through Shonen Sunday magazine from 1988 to 1994, the 22-volume series takes place in a separate timeline.

==== Japanese volumes ====
Original release:

No.	Release date	ISBN
1	July 1988	4091221211
2	September 1988	409122122X
3	December 1988	4091221238
4	July 1989	4091221246
5	December 1989	4091221254
6	March 1990	4091221262
7	June 1990	4091221270
8	September 1990	4091221289
9	January 1991	4091221297
10	April 1991	4091221300
11	July 1991	4091226019
12	October 1991	4091226027
13	December 1991	4091226035
14	March 1992	4091226043
15	May 1992	4091226051
16	October 1992	409122606X
17	April 1993	4091226078
18	June 1993	4091226086
19	September 1993	4091226094
20	December 1993	4091226108
21	March 1994	4091233112
22	August 1994	4091233120

Bunkoban release:

No.	Release date	ISBN
1	January 2000	4091932711
2	January 2000	409193272X
3	March 2000	4091932738
4	March 2000	4091932746
5	May 2000	4091932754
6	May 2000	4091932762
7	July 2000	4091932770
8	July 2000	4091932789
9	September 2000	4091932797
10	September 2000	4091932800
11	November 2000	4091932819

==== North America volumes ====
Viz released first two volumes of the manga as individual comics in 1997 and 1998, then released them as volumes. However, due to a lack of sales, Viz dropped the series and the remaining 20 volumes have not been officially translated:

No.	Release date	ISBN
1	1998	1569312877
2	1998	1569313377

==== Crossover with Zoids franchise ====
As part of Zoids's 40th anniversary celebrations, a crossover manga between Zoids and Patlabor called Code Name B.U.D.D.Y began releasing in 2025. The manga is written by Kazunori Itō and drawn by Naoto Tsushima. The story follows the Zoid (a type of animalistic mecha) Hunter Wolf working with Special Vehicles Division 2 to protect Tokyo.

==== Mobile Police Patlabor 2026 ====
In May 2026, a new one-shot manga by Masami Yūki was published in Shogakukan's Weekly Big Comic Spirits magazine, showing how Tokyo and Division 2 have changed by 2026. The short manga also provides an introduction to the Patlabor EZY series released simultaneously in theaters.

=== Anime ===
==== The Early Days ====
- Patlabor: The Early Days (1988–1989, OVA series, 7 episodes)

The series was originally published in Japan as Mobile Police Patlabor. It details the origins of the Tokyo MPD's 2nd Special Vehicles Section, otherwise known as SV2.

==== Movies ====
- Patlabor: The Movie (1989)

A series of random labor incidents across the Greater Tokyo Area puts the SV2 on the case. The incidents turn out to be part of a dead programmer's diabolical plot to create a much bigger rampage.

- Patlabor 2: The Movie (1993)

A secret group of terrorists engineer a crisis in Tokyo in the winter of 2001–2002. The members of SV2's Section 2, who have been reassigned to other duties following a decline in Tokyo Labor usage, reunite one more time to stop the threat.

- WXIII: Patlabor the Movie 3 (2002)

Taking place a year after Patlabor: The Movie, the film features two MPD detectives who investigate the case of missing scientists working on a genetic engineering project that runs amok in Tokyo Bay. SV2's Section 2 is later called in to help rein in the danger.

A three-part series of short films known as Mobile Police Patlabor Minimum (MiniPato) were shown before screenings of WXIII. MiniPato uses paper puppets, CGI, and claymation to explain the rationale behind the whole concept of the series, especially how the Labors functioned in a realistic hard science fiction setting.

==== The TV Series and The New Files ====
- Patlabor: The TV Series (1989–1990, TV, 47 episodes)

Taking place in a different continuity, the series features more adventures of SV2 Section 2, which includes an arc involving their efforts to combat an advanced Schaft Enterprises Labor called the Type J9 Griffon.

- Patlabor: The New Files (1990–1992, OVA, 16 episodes)

Also referred to as Patlabor 2, the series contains episodes that took place at several points between certain episodes in the TV series and after the latter's final episode. The OVA also features the conclusion of the Griffon story arc.

==== Patlabor Reboot ====
Patlabor Reboot (機動警察パトレイバーREBOOT, Kidō Keisatsu Patoreibā Reboot) is a short animated film released on October 15, 2016, as part of Japan Animator Expo, featuring a modernized version of Patlabor with new characters and using CG for the Labors, animated by Studio Khara and Studio Rikka.

==== Patlabor EZY ====
Set in 2033 Japan in the TV series continuity, Patlabor EZY follows a new generation of officers in the Tokyo Metropolitan Police Department's Special Vehicle Section 2 dealing with Labor crimes and accidents, even as Labors are becoming obsolete from the increase in AI-driven automation. The series consists of eight episodes released in Japan as three theatrical installments from 2026–2027.

Studio J.C.Staff is creating the anime, with Yutaka Izubuchi as director and Kazunori Itō as scriptwriter.

=== Live-action series ===
The Next Generation: Patlabor is a live-action series and film created by Mamoru Oshii, as a sequel to the OVA continiuty, starring Erina Mano as pilot Akira Izumino, Seiji Fukushi as Yūma Shiobara, Rina Oota as Ekaterina Krachevna Kankaeva ("Kasha"), Shigeru Chiba reprising his anime role as chief mechanic Shigeo Shiba and Toshio Kakei as Captain Keiji Gotōda.

"Deck-up" events, where the full-scale, 9-meter tall AV-98 Ingrams used for filming are lifted from their carrier and into a standing position, were used for promoting The Next Generation at events around Japan (such as the Tokyo Motorcycle Show). Even after the series concluded in 2015, the deck-up events continued to prove popular, and the Ingram often makes an appearance at festivals around Japan.

=== Novels ===
==== Patlabor ====
Novels taking place in the same universe as the Early Days OVA and first movie.

- Kidō Keisatsu Patlabor: Fuusoku 40 Meter (Kazunori Itō) – October 1990
- Kidō Keisatsu Patlabor 2: Syntax Error (Michiko Yokote) – March 1992
- Kidō Keisatsu Patlabor 3: Third Mission (Michiko Yokote) – September 1992
- Kidō Keisatsu Patlabor 4: Blackjack (Zenpen) (Michiko Yokote) – July 1993
- Kidō Keisatsu Patlabor 5: Blackjack (Kouhen) (Michiko Yokote) – October 1993

==== Tokyo War ====
Novelizations of the second movie:

- Tokyo War: Kidō Keisatsu Patlabor (Zenpen) (Mamoru Oshii) – April 1994
- Tokyo War: Kidō Keisatsu Patlabor (Kouhen) (Mamoru Oshii) – May 1994

A hardcover edition combining the two older volumes:

- Tokyo War Mobile Police Patlabor (Mamoru Oshii) – June 2005

==== The Next Generation ====
Novels taking place in the world of The Next Generation.

- The Next Generation Patlabor 1: Yuuma no Yuuutsu (Kei Yamamura) – March 2014
- The Next Generation Patlabor 2: Akira no Ashita (Kei Yamamura) – April 2014
- The Next Generation Patlabor 3: Shiroi Kasha (Kei Yamamura) – June 2014
- The Next Generation Patlabor: Akai Kasha (Kei Yamamura) – February 2015

The fourth novel by Yamamura is not numbered.

- The Next Generation Patlabor: Tokyo War 2 Haiiro no Yuurei (Mamoru Oshii and Kei Yamamura) – May 2015

Novelization of the live action movie Shuto Kessen, which is also a sequel to the Tokyo War novels.

==== Other ====
- Bankuruwase: Keishi-chou Keibi-bu Tokushu Sharyou Ni-ka (Mamoru Oshii) – January 2011

A sequel to Patlabor taking place in the present day with a new generation of SV2 members, later used as inspiration for The Next Generation.

- Kouseki no Otoko (Mamoru Oshii) – 2015

A short story included in the anthology Tag: Watashi no Aibou (2015) taking place in the Patlabor world.

- Mobile Police Patlabor: Sushiya no Goto (Kazunori Itō) – 2026

A companion novel to Patlabor EZY, taking place 30 years after the original series.

=== Video games ===
Most of the Patlabor video games were released exclusively in Japan. The exception is Patlabor: The Case Files, which had a worldwide release:

- Kidō Keisatsu Patlabor (Family Computer Disk System – January 24, 1989)
- Kidō Keisatsu Patlabor: Nerawareta Machi 1990 (Game Boy – August 25, 1990)
- Kidō Keisatsu Patlabor: 98-Shiki Kidou Seyo! (Mega Drive – October 23, 1992)
- Kidō Keisatsu Patlabor: Griffon-hen (PC Engine Super CD-ROM² – September 30, 1993)
- Kidō Keisatsu Patlabor (Super Famicom – April 22, 1994)
- Kidō Keisatsu Patlabor: Game Edition (PlayStation – November 30, 2000)
- Patlabor: Come Back Mini-Pato (PlayStation Portable – November 2, 2005)
- Patlabor: The Case Files (PlayStation 5, Steam – September 16, 2026)

Patlabor mecha have also made appearances in:

- Super Robot Wars Operation Extend (PlayStation Portable – July 18, 2013)
- Kyoei Toshi (PlayStation 4 – October 19, 2017)

== Licensing ==
Overseas rights to Patlabor have changed several times since its release, resulting in parts of the franchise being more widely accessible than others. The first two movies were released and widely promoted in the U.S. by Manga Entertainment, and later remastered and re-released in 2006 by Bandai Visual, while the TV series and OVAs were released by the smaller distributor US Manga Corps, a division of Central Park Media. The third movie, along with "Mini-Pato", was released by Geneon Entertainment (formerly Pioneer) in theaters and on DVD.

Two volumes of the manga were translated and published by Viz Communications in twelve single issues beginning in 1998, but Viz dropped the manga before continuing and the rest has never been officially translated. The video games, novels and live action series have never been officially released outside of Japan, and no overseas licensing has been announced yet for Patlabor EZY.

Madman has the distribution rights for the movies in Australia and New Zealand in association with Manga Entertainment UK & TFC, but they have been refused the rights to the Bandai Visual dubs of the films. In 2011, Madman received the rights to the OVA and TV series from TFC, and began releasing them in 2014. MVM Films has the licenses for the OVA & TV series for distribution in the UK and released them on DVD in 2013.

In 2013, Maiden Japan (in conjunction with Section23 Films) acquired the license to the Patlabor OVA series, and released it on Blu-ray and DVD on April 30, 2013. They subsequently licensed and released the TV series on July 16, 2013; the second OVA series on February 17, 2015; and all of the anime films, with the first film released on May 5, 2015.

== Headgear ==
Headgear (ヘッドギア, Heddogia) is a group consisting of five main writers and artists who work in the Japanese anime/manga field: Masami Yūki, Mamoru Oshii, Akemi Takada, Kazunori Itō, and Yutaka Izubuchi. The group was set up so that all the creators would retain full copyright to their work, rather than having the production company or the toy sponsor own the rights. (Note: This is why the Patlabor manga and anime are in separate continuities; if the anime was based on the manga, then publisher Shogakukan would have been involved in copyright.) Headgear's members also did not want to involve large companies that might bog down their projects. Along with Patlabor, Headgear also created the two episode OVA Twilight Q.

Other staff involved with Headgear include Kenji Kawai, Naoyuki Yoshinaga, Takayama Fumihiko, Kenji Kamiyama, and Miki Tori.

== Reception and legacy ==
Patlabor has garnered particular acclaim for its grounded, near-future setting and rounded characters. Critic Naoya Fujita calls its "unique appeal" a vision of the future "not as something thrilling, but as a continuation of mundane, everyday life". Against the backdrop of other mecha shows from the time, Patlabor's popularity—especially that of its episodic works such as the OVAs and TV series—was the way in which it featured "ordinary people navigating their way through a world steeped in everyday reality". The movies, which focus on heavier themes and, in the case of Patlabor 2, contemporary social issues like the role of the JSDF and martial law, are seen as some of director Mamoru Oshii's finest work; Tim Maughan of Reactor Magazine described Patlabor 2 as one of the most important anime films for anyone to watch, an "unmissable, if challenging, work ... due to its uncompromising approach to its political themes and its breathless, stark cinematic beauty". However, the slow pacing of Patlabor has been criticized, given that for a mecha anime "the characters spend most of the story outside these machines".

A report commissioned by Japan's Agency for Cultural Affairs credits Patlabor: The Early Days with revitalizing the OVA format for mecha anime and establishing the standard six-episode OVA format. In proving that OVAs could be financially viable through lower budgets and the inclusion of commercials on the disc, Patlabor was a business framework that since became the industry standard for OVAs, and later the roots of "late-night anime."

The manga received the 36th Shogakukan Manga Award for shōnen in 1991. Patlabor: The Early Days and Patlabor 2 were both nominated for the Seiun Award.

Patlabor's realistic mecha design has influenced several other robots both in fiction and in reality. When Japan's National Institute of Advanced Industrial Science and Technology (AIST) were developing humanoid robots, they invited Yutaka Izubuchi to create the exterior design and look of the robot because of his work on Patlabor. Guillermo del Toro has cited the series as an influence for Pacific Rim.
