= List of multimedia franchises originating in print =

Following is a list of multimedia franchises originating in print publications, including literary works, comic books, and comic strips.

To qualify for purposes of this list, the original media must have originated from the work of an identifiable author or set of co-authors, and must have been adapted into works in at least three forms of media, and must have two or more separate works in at least two of those forms of media (a television series or comic book series is considered a single work for purposes of this list; multiple spin-off series or remakes of a previously ended series are considered multiple works). For example, a novel that spawned one film and one television series would not qualify; a series of novels made into a television series that had a spin-off series, or was remade as a new series, and which also spawned one film, does qualify.

In the following tables, the initial media through which the franchise characters or settings became known is shown in boldface. Only works of fiction are only considered part of the series; a book or a documentary film about the franchise is not itself an installment in the franchise.

== Franchises originating in literary works ==
These franchises began as novels, short stories, and other forms of purely literary works.

Franchise (Creator)	Literature	Comics	Animated films	Live action films	Animated TV	Live action TV	Video games	Other media
87th Precinct; Evan Hunter	**Cop Hater** (1956) several sequels	87th Precinct (1962), Cop Hater (1990)	no	Cop Hater (1958); The Mugger (1958); The Pusher (1960) several others	no	87th Precinct (TV series) (1961–62)	no	no
A Song of Ice and Fire (George R. R. Martin)	**A Game of Thrones** (1996) several sequels	A Game of Thrones (2011–2014); A Clash of Kings (2017–2021)	no	Game of Thrones: Aegon's Conquest (2029)	Nine Voyages (TBA)	Game of Thrones (2011–2019); House of the Dragon (2022–); A Knight of the Seven Kingdoms (2026–)	several, beginning in 2007	board games, role-playing games, music, stage play, exhibits
Arthur (Marc Brown)	**Arthur's Nose** (1976) several more books	no	Arthur's Missing Pal (2006)	no	Arthur (1996–2022); Postcards from Buster (2004–2012); Hop (2024)	no	yes	children's albums, toys, apparel
American Psycho (Bret Easton Ellis)	**American Psycho** (1991); Budapesti skizo (1997)	no	no	American Psycho (2000); American Psycho 2 (2002)	no	no	no	musical
Babar (Jean de Brunhoff)	**The Story of Babar** (1931) various	no	Babar and Father Christmas (1986); Babar: The Movie (1989); Babar: King of the Elephants (1999)	no	Babar (1989–1991; 2000); Babar and the Adventures of Badou (2010–2014); 2 TV specials	Les Aventures de Babar (1968)	various	various
Berenstain Bears (Stan and Jan Berenstain)	**The Big Honey Hunt** (1962) several more	no	TV specials	no	The Berenstain Bears Show (1985–1987); The Berenstain Bear (2002–2004)	no	various	-
Blade Runner (Philip K. Dick)	**Do Androids Dream of Electric Sheep?** (1968) three sequels by another writer	several	Blade Runner Black Out 2022 (2022)	Blade Runner (1982); Blade Runner 2049 (2017)	no	no	Blade Runner (1985); Blade Runner (1997)	-
Bourne (Robert Ludlum)	**The Bourne Identity** (1980) several sequels	no	no	The Bourne Identity (1988 TV movie), The Bourne Identity (2002), and several sequels	no	no	Robert Ludlum's The Bourne Conspiracy (2008)	-
Captain Underpants (Dav Pilkey)	**The Adventures of Captain Underpants** (1997) eleven sequels	in-universe graphic novel series, including Dog Man (2016-present); 2026 manga adaptation	Captain Underpants: The First Epic Movie (2017); Dog Man (2025); Untitled Dog Man sequel (TBA) three TV specials	a brief live-action sock puppet sequence featured in the 2017 film	The Epic Tales of Captain Underpants (2018–2020)	no	yes	yes
The Cat in the Hat (Dr. Seuss)	**The Cat in the Hat** (1957); The Cat in the Hat Comes Back (1958) several subsequent appearances	?	1971 TV special of the same name The Grinch Grinches the Cat in the Hat (1982); The Cat in the Hat (2026)	The Cat in the Hat (2003)	The Cat in the Hat Knows a Lot About That! (2010-)	The Wubbulous World of Dr. Seuss	yes	theme park attractions musical
Charlie and the Chocolate Factory (Roald Dahl)	**Charlie and the Chocolate Factory** (1964); Charlie and the Great Glass Elevator (1972); Charlie and the Christmas Factory (2024)	The Complete Adventures of Charlie and Mr. Willy Wonka (2010)	Tom and Jerry: Willy Wonka and the Chocolate Factory (2017)	Willy Wonka & the Chocolate Factory (1971); Charlie and the Chocolate Factory (2005); Wonka (2023)	no	no	Charlie and the Chocolate Factory (1985); Charlie and the Chocolate Factory (2005); Charlie and the Chocolate Factory Island (2012)	Charlie and the Chocolate Factory: The Ride (2006–2015); Willy Wonka (musical; 2004); The Golden Ticket (opera; 2010); Charlie and the Chocolate Factory (musical; 2013)
The Chronicles of Narnia (C. S. Lewis)	**The Lion, the Witch and the Wardrobe** (1950) several sequels	no	The Lion, the Witch and the Wardrobe (1979)	The Chronicles of Narnia film series (2005–present)	no	The Lion, the Witch and the Wardrobe (1967); The Chronicles of Narnia (1988–1990)	various	radio dramatisation, audiobooks
Conan the Barbarian (Robert E. Howard)	**Original Robert E. Howard Conan stories** (published from 1932–1936); various later publications	Conan the Barbarian (comics)	no	Conan the Barbarian (1982), and several others	Conan the Adventurer (1992–1993); Conan and the Young Warriors (1994)	Conan The Adventurer (1997–1998)	several, beginning with Conan: Hall of Volta (1984)	-
Clifford the Big Red Dog (Norman Bridwell)	**Clifford the Big Red Dog** (1963) numerous sequels	Clifford the Big Red Dog: The Movie Graphic Novel (2021)	Clifford's Really Big Movie (2004)	Clifford the Big Red Dog (2021); Clifford the Big Red Dog 2 (TBA)	Clifford the Big Red Dog (1988 video series); Clifford the Big Red Dog (2000-2003); Clifford's Puppy Days (2003-2006); Clifford the Big Red Dog (2019-2021)	no	yes	-
Caillou (Hélène Desputeaux)	Caillou (1989) numerous sequels	Yes	Caillou's Holiday Movie (2003)	Yes	Caillou (1997-2011)	yes	yes	yes
The Chinese Siamese Cat (Amy Tan)	The Chinese Siamese Cat (1994); numerous sequels	Yes	yes	yes	Sagwa, the Chinese Siamese Cat (2001-2002)	yes	yes	yes
Curious George (Hans Augusto Rey and Margret Rey)	**Curious George** (1941); numerous sequels	no	Curious George (2006); various	Curious George (TBA)	Curious George TV series (2006); various	no	Curious George video game (2006)	-
Die Hard (Roderick Thorp)	The Detective (1966); **Nothing Lasts Forever** (1979)	yes	no	Die Hard (1988); Die Hard 2 (1992); Die Hard with a Vengeance (1995); Live Free or Die Hard (2007); A Good Day to Die Hard (2013)	no	no	several	no
Discworld (Terry Pratchett)	**The Colour of Magic** (1983); several sequels and spin-offs	yes	no	Hogfather (2006); The Colour of Magic (2008); Going Postal (2010)	Soul Music (1997); Wyrd Sisters (1998)	The Watch (2021)	several	stage and radio plays board games
Diary of a Wimpy Kid (Jeff Kinney)	Diary of a Wimpy Kid (2007) several sequels spin-off series	no	Diary of a Wimpy Kid (2021); Diary of a Wimpy Kid: Rodrick Rules (2022); Diary of a Wimpy Kid Christmas: Cabin Fever (2023) Diary of a Wimpy Kid: The Last Straw(2025)	Diary of a Wimpy Kid (2010); Diary of a Wimpy Kid: Rodrick Rules (2011); Diary of a Wimpy Kid: Dog Days (2012); Diary of a Wimpy Kid: The Long Haul (2017)	no	no	Poptropica tie-ins	Toys; Action figures
Dune (Frank Herbert)	**Dune** (1965); numerous prequel and sequel novels	Dune: The Official Comic Book	no	Dune (1984); Dune (2021); Dune: Part Two (2024) Dune: Part Three (2026)	no	Frank Herbert's Dune (2000); Frank Herbert's Children of Dune (2003); Dune: Prophecy (2024)	Dune (1992); several others	Dune board game (1979); other games, soundtracks
Ender's Game (Orson Scott Card)	**Ender's Game** (1985) several prequels, sequels, and spinoffs	several	no	Ender's Game (2013)	no	no	no	audioplay
Fast & Furious (Kenneth Li and Gary Scott Thompson)	"**Racer X**" (1998 article)	?	no	The Fast and the Furious (2001); Better Luck Tomorrow (2002); 2 Fast 2 Furious (2003); The Fast and the Furious: Tokyo Drift (2006); Fast & Furious (2009); Fast Five (2011); Fast & Furious 6 (2013); Furious 7 (2015); The Fate of the Furious (2017); Hobbs & Shaw (2019); F9 (2021); Fast X (2023); Fast Forever (2028); Fast & Furious Presents: Hobbs & Reyes (TBA); Untitled stand-alone film (TBA); Untitled female-lead spin-off (TBA) and 2 short films	Fast & Furious Spy Racers (2019-2021)	no	List of Fast & Furious video games	various
Gidget (Frederick Kohner)	**Gidget, the Little Girl with Big Ideas** (1957) seven sequels	yes, two issues published in 1966	Gidget Makes the Wrong Connection (1972; made for TV)	Gidget (1965); Gidget Goes Hawaiian (1961); Gidget Goes to Rome (1963)	no	Gidget (1965–1966); The New Gidget (1986–1988)	no	Stage productions in 2000 and 2007
Greyfriars School (Charles Hamilton)	**The Magnet** (1908); **Billy Bunter of Greyfriars School** (1947)	yes	no	no	no	Billy Bunter of Greyfriars School (TV series)	no	Stage, Radio
The Godfather (Mario Puzo)	**The Godfather** (1969) several sequels	no	no	The Godfather (1972); The Godfather Part II (1974); The Godfather Part III (1990)	no	The Godfather Saga (1977)	The Godfather (1991); The Godfather (2006); The Godfather II (2010)	-
Hannibal Lecter (Thomas Harris)	**Red Dragon** (1981) several sequels	no	no	Manhunter (1986); The Silence of the Lambs (1991); Hannibal (2001); Red Dragon (2002); Hannibal Rising (2007)	no	Hannibal (2013–2015); Clarice (2021-)	no	-
Harold and the Purple Crayon (Crockett Johnson)	**Harold and the Purple Crayon** (1955) numerous sequels	no	Harold and the Purple Crayon (short film; 1959)	Harold and the Purple Crayon (2024)	Harold and the Purple Crayon (2001)	no	no	no
Harry Potter (J.K. Rowling)	**Harry Potter and the Philosopher's Stone** (1997) several sequels	no	no	Harry Potter (film series) (eight films released between 2001 and 2011)	no	Harry Potter (TBA)	yes	The Wizarding World of Harry Potter theme parks Warner Bros. Studio Tour London - The Making of Harry Potter
Haruhi Suzumiya (Nagaru Tanigawa)	**The Melancholy of Haruhi Suzumiya** (2003) several sequels	Haruhi Suzumiya (2004); The Melancholy of Haruhi Suzumiya (2005-2013); The Melancholy of Suzumiya Haruhi-chan (2007-2018); Nyorōn Churuya-san (2007-2008); The Disappearance of Nagato Yuki-chan (2009-2016)	The Disappearance of Haruhi Suzumiya (2010)	no	The Melancholy of Haruhi Suzumiya (2006-2009)	no	several	Original net animations for Haruhi-chan and Churuya-san, live action promotional videos, multiple character singles, alongside audio dramas
Hercule Poirot (Agatha Christie)	**The Mysterious Affair at Styles** (1920) several other novels and short stories	Great Detectives Poirot and Marple (2004–2005) graphic novel adaptations	no	yes	Great Detectives Poirot and Marple (2004–2005)	Poirot (1989–2013)	Murder on the Orient Express (2006); 3 sequels	stage and radio plays
Herbie (Gordon Buford)	**Car, Boy, Girl** (1961, unpublished) film novelizations	three Gold Key Comics under the Walt Disney Showcase	no	The Love Bug (1968); Herbie Rides Again (1974); Herbie Goes to Monte Carlo (1977); Herbie Goes Bananas (1980); Herbie: Fully Loaded (2005)	no	Herbie, the Love Bug	Herbie: Fully Loaded (2005); Herbie Rescue Rally (2007)	-
His Dark Materials (Phillip Pullman)	**Northern Lights** (1995)	no	no	The Golden Compass (2007)	no	His Dark Materials (2019)	no	His Dark Materials (2003), radio drama (2003), Lyra's Oxford
How to Train Your Dragon (Cressida Cowell)	**Hiccup: The Viking Who Was Seasick** (1999); How to Train Your Dragon (2003) several sequels	yes	How to Train Your Dragon (2010); How to Train Your Dragon 2 (2014); How to Train Your Dragon: The Hidden World (2019); 6 short films	How to Train Your Dragon (2025); How To Train Your Dragon 2 (2027)	DreamWorks Dragons (2012–2018); DreamWorks Dragons: Rescue Riders (2019-); DreamWorks Dragons: The Nine Realms (2021-2023)	no	yes	live stage show toys
The Hunger Games (Suzanne Collins)	**The Hunger Games** (2008); Catching Fire (2009); Mockingjay (2010); The Ballad of Songbirds and Snakes (2020); Sunrise on the Reaping (2025)	no	no	The Hunger Games (2012); The Hunger Games: Catching Fire (2013); The Hunger Games: Mockingjay – Part 1 (2014); The Hunger Games: Mockingjay – Part 2 (2015); The Hunger Games: The Ballad of Songbirds and Snakes (2023); The Hunger Games: Sunrise on the Reaping (2026)	no	no	no	The Hunger Games: On Stage (2025)
James Bond (Ian Fleming)	**Casino Royale** (1953); 13 additional novels over 30 other novels and published stories by other authors	various	no	James Bond in film	James Bond Jr. (1991–1992)	"Casino Royale" (Climax! season 1 – episode 3) (1954)	James Bond in video games	James Bond 007: Role-Playing In Her Majesty's Secret Service radio dramas various toys
Jennings (Anthony Buckeridge)	**Jennings (1950–1994)**	no	no	Stompa	no	several	no	Stage, Radio
Jumanji (Chris Van Allsburg)	**Jumanji** (1981); Zathura (2002)	no	no	Jumanji (1995); Zathura: A Space Adventure (2005); Jumanji: Welcome to the Jungle (2017); Jumanji: The Next Level (2019) Jumanji: Open World (2026)	Jumanji (TV series) (1996–1999)	no	various	three board games (Jumanji: The Game (1995); Zathura: Adventure is Waiting (2005); Jumanji: The Game (2017))
Jurassic Park (Michael Crichton)	**Jurassic Park** (1990); The Lost World (1995)	various	Lego Jurassic World: The Indominus Escape (2016)	Jurassic Park (1993); The Lost World: Jurassic Park (1997); Jurassic Park III (2001); Jurassic World (2015); Jurassic World: Fallen Kingdom (2018); Jurassic World Dominion (2022); Jurassic World Rebirth (2025); 2 short films	Lego Jurassic World: The Secret Exhibit (2018); Lego Jurassic World: Legend of Isla Nublar (2019); Lego Jurassic World: Double Trouble (2020); Jurassic World Camp Cretaceous (2020–present); Jurassic World: Chaos Theory (2024–2025)	no	Jurassic Park video games	List of Jurassic Park water rides
Left Behind (Tim LaHaye and Jerry B. Jenkins)	**Left Behind** (1995); 15 prequel and sequel novels Left Behind: The Kids series	no	no	Left Behind: The Movie (2000); Left Behind II: Tribulation Force (2002); Left Behind: World at War (2004); Left Behind (2014); Vanished – Left Behind: Next Generation (2016)	no	no	Left Behind: Eternal Forces	no
The Lunar Chronicles (Marissa Meyer)	The Lunar Chronicles (2012-2015) Book series	yes	The Lunar Chronicles (2028)	Yes	yes	Yes	Video game	toy Live Stage
Legend of the Galactic Heroes (Yoshiki Tanaka)	**Legend of the Galactic Heroes** (1982–1987)	Legend of the Galactic Heroes (1986–2000)	spinoffs to OVA series (1988–1993); The Legend of the Galactic Heroes: Die Neue These Seiran trilogy (2019)	no	The Legend of the Galactic Heroes: Die Neue These Kaikō (2018)	no	several	Legend of the Galactic Heroes OVA series (1988–1997); Legend of the Galactic Heroes Gaiden OVA series (1988–1997)
Mary Poppins (P. L. Travers)	**Mary Poppins** (eight books; 1934–1988)	no	no	Mary Poppins (1964); Mary Poppins Returns (2018)	no	no	no	Mary Poppins (musical) soundtracks, toys and more
Megami Tensei (Aya Nishitani)	**Digital Devil Story** (1986) two sequels and video game adaptations	List of Megami Tensei manga	Persona 3 The Movie: Chapter 1, Spring of Birth (2013)	no	List of Megami Tensei anime	no	Video game series and spin offs	various media
Miss Marple (Agatha Christie)	**The Royal Magazine** (1927)	Great Detectives Poirot and Marple (2004–2005) graphic novel adaptations	yes	The Body in the Library (1984), The Moving Finger (1985), Nemesis (1987), A Caribbean Mystery (1989) The Mirror Cracked from Side to Side (1992)	no	Miss Marple#Television	no	Miss Marple#Stage
Miffy (Dick Bruna)	no	Miffy, Miffy at the Zoo (1955)	Miffy the Movie (2013)	no	Miffy's Adventures Big and Small (2015), Miffy and Friends (2003)	no	no	Miffy's Bicycle (2017) play
Monogatari (Nisio Isin)	**Monogatari** (novel series with over 26 volumes; 2005–2021)	Bakemonogatari (manga)	Kizumonogatari	no	no	Monogatari Series	no	Bakemonogatari Portable
Moomins (Tove Jansson)	**The Moomins and the Great Flood** (1945) several sequels and other books	Moomin comic strips comic book	Comet in Moominland (1993); Moomins on the Riviera (2014) two compilation movies	no	several	several	several	Moomin World theme park Moomin Museum other merchandise
Mr. Men (Roger Hargreaves)	**Mr. Tickle** (1971); List of Mr. Men	no	Mr. Men#Film	no	several	no	First Steps with Mr. Men (1983); Word Games with Mr. Men (1984); Mr. Men arcade (2002) etc.	Little Miss
One Hundred and One Dalmatians (Dodie Smith)	**The Hundred and One Dalmatians** (1956); The Starlight Barking (1967)	-	One Hundred and One Dalmatians (1961); 101 Dalmatians II: Patch's London Adventure (2003)	101 Dalmatians (1996); 102 Dalmatians (2000); Cruella (2021)	101 Dalmatians: The Series (1997–1998); 101 Dalmatian Street (2019–2020)	no	101 Dalmatians: Escape from DeVil Manor (1997)	toys, magazines, albums, apparel, The 101 Dalmatians Musical (2009)
Paddington Bear (Michael Bond)	**A Bear Called Paddington** (1958)	no	no	Paddington (film) (2014); Paddington 2 (2017); Paddington in Peru (2024)	Paddington (TV series) (1976); Paddington Bear (TV series) (1989); The Adventures of Paddington Bear (1997); The Adventures of Paddington (2019 TV series) (2019)	no	no	Paddington: The Musical (2025)
Parasite Eve (Hideaki Sena)	**Parasite Eve** (1995)	yes	no	Parasite Eve (1997)	no	no	Parasite Eve (1998); Parasite Eve II (1999); The 3rd Birthday (2010)	Soundtracks, guidebooks, figure action and various merchandise
Perry Mason (Erle Stanley Gardner)	**The Case of the Velvet Claws** (1933); 81 other novels	no	no	no	no	Perry Mason (1957–1966); The New Perry Mason (1973–1974); Perry Mason TV movies (1985–1995)	no	Perry Mason radio show
Peter Rabbit (Beatrix Potter)	**The Tale of Peter Rabbit** (1902) several sequels	no	Peter Rabbit (film) (2018), Peter Rabbit 2: The Runaway (2021)	The Tales of Beatrix Potter (1971), Peter Rabbit (film) (2018), Peter Rabbit 2: The Runaway (2021)	The World of Peter Rabbit and Friends (1992), Peter Rabbit (TV series) (2012)	no	yes	various
Pippi Longstocking (Astrid Lindgren)	**Pippi Långstrump** (1945)	no	Pippi Longstocking (1997 film)	Pippi Longstocking (1949 film)	Pippi Longstocking (1997 TV series)	no	various	no
Planet of the Apes (Pierre Boulle)	**La Planète des singes** (1963) several sequels	Planet of the Apes (comics)	no	Planet of the Apes (1968); numerous sequels, and a reboot series.	Return to the Planet of the Apes (1975)	Planet of the Apes (1974)	yes	various
Professor Branestawm (Norman Hunter)	**The Incredible Adventures of Professor Branestawm** (1933) several sequels	no	no	yes	no	yes	no	no
Psycho (Robert Bloch)	**Psycho** (1959)	graphic novels (1992)	no	American Psycho (1960); Various sequels and remakes	no	Bates Motel (2013–2017)	video game (1988)	various
Rambo (David Morrell)	**First Blood** (1972) various others	several	no	First Blood (1982); Rambo: First Blood Part II (1985); Rambo III (1988); Rambo (2008); Rambo: Last Blood (2019)	Rambo: The Force of Freedom (1986)	no	various	no
Robert Langdon (Dan Brown)	**Angels & Demons** (2000); The Da Vinci Code (2003)	no	no	Robert Langdon (film series)	no	The Lost Symbol (TV series)	no	no
Rudolph the Red-Nosed Reindeer (Robert L. May)	**Rudolph the Red-Nosed Reindeer** (1939) several sequels	yes	Rudolph the Red-Nosed Reindeer: The Movie (1998); Rudolph the Red-Nosed Reindeer and the Island of Misfit Toys (2001)	Rudolph the Red-Nosed Reindeer (TBA)	Rudolph the Red-Nosed Reindeer (1964 TV special) various TV specials	no	no	Rudolph the Red-Nosed Reindeer (song, 1959)
Sex and the City (Candace Bushnell)	**Sex and the City** (1997); The Carrie Diaries (2010); Summer and the City (2011)	no	no	Sex and the City; Sex and the City 2	no	Sex and the City; The Carrie Diaries	no	Sex and the City (newspaper column)
Shrek (William Steig)	**Shrek!** (1990)	yes	Shrek (2001); Shrek 2 (2004); Shrek the Third (2007); Shrek Forever After (2010); Puss in Boots (2011); Puss in Boots: The Last Wish (2022); Shrek 5 (2027) Donkey (2028) various shorts and TV specials	no	Puss in Boots (2015-2018)	no	yes	Shrek the Musical, theme park attractions
Starship Troopers (Robert A. Heinlein)	**Starship Troopers** (1959)	no	Starship Troopers: Invasion (2012)	Starship Troopers (1997); 2 direct-to-DVD sequels	Roughnecks: Starship Troopers Chronicles (1999–2000)	no	yes	several table-top games original video animation
Sword Art Online (Reki Kawahara)	List of **Sword Art Online light novels**	List of Sword Art Online manga volumes	Sword Art Online The Movie: Ordinal Scale (2017)	no	Sword Art Online (2012); Sword Art Online II (2014); Sword Art Online: Alicization (2018–present)	no	yes	Figures
Middle-earth (J. R. R. Tolkien)	**The Hobbit** (1937); The Fellowship of the Ring (1954); The Two Towers (1955); The Return of the King (1954) two poetry books (1962-1967) other literature	various	The Hobbit (1977); The Lord of the Rings (1978); The Return of the King (1980); The Lord of the Rings: The War of the Rohirrim (2024)	The Lord of the Rings trilogy (2001−2003); The Hobbit trilogy (2012−2014)	no	The Lord of the Rings: The Rings of Power (2022-)	Middle-earth in video games	various media
Tales of Arcadia (Guillermo del Toro)	**Trollhunters** (2015) others	yes	Trollhunters: Rise of the Titans (2021)	no	Trollhunters: Tales of Arcadia (2016-2018); 3Below: Tales of Arcadia (2018-2019); Wizards: Tales of Arcadia (2020)	no	Trollhunters: Defenders of Arcadia (2020)	-
Thomas & Friends (Wilbert Awdry)	**The Railway Series**	no	yes	Thomas and the Magic Railroad (2000); Thomas & Friends (TBA)	Thomas & Friends (1984–2021); Thomas & Friends: All Engines Go (2021–2025) Thomas & Friends: Railway Stories (2026–present)	Shining Time Station (1989–1993)	yes	videos, toys, scale models, albums, other merchandise, live stage shows, Day Out with Thomas
Tom Clancy media (Tom Clancy)	**The Hunt for Red October** (1984)	various	no	The Hunt for Red October (1990) several others films and short films	no	Tom Clancy's Jack Ryan (2018-)	Tom Clancy's Rainbow Six (1998) several sequels and spin-off Tom Clancy's Ghost Recon (2001) several sequels Tom Clancy's Splinter Cell (2002) several sequels	no
Top Gun (Ehud Yonay, Jim Cash and Jack Epps Jr.)	**"Top Guns"** (1983 article)	no	no	Top Gun (1986); Top Gun: Maverick (2022) "Top Gun 3" (TBA)	no	no	List of Top Gun video games	soundtracks, merchandise
The Vampire Chronicles (Anne Rice)	**Interview with the Vampire** (1976); Twelve more novels in that series	yes	no	Interview with the Vampire (1994); Queen of the Damned (2002)	no	Interview with the Vampire (2022); Mayfair Witches (2023)	no	Lestat: The Musical (2005–2006)
The Wicked Years (Gregory Maguire)	**Wicked: The Life and Times of the Wicked Witch of the West** (1995); Son of a Witch (2005); A Lion Among Men (2008); Out of Oz (2011)	graphic novel adaptation (2024)	no	Wicked (2024); Wicked: For Good (2025); A two-part film adaptation of the 2003 stage musical loosely based on the first novel.	no	no	An online community tie-in with Roblox	2003 stage musical, talent competition, various TV specials including A Very Wicked Halloween (2018), and theme park attractions
Winnie-the-Pooh (A. A. Milne)	**When We Were Very Young** (1924); Winnie the Pooh and The House at Pooh Corner; Featured in two others	yes	various	Christopher Robin (2018); Outside of that film, not primarily. A bit of live-action was used in some of the animated films.	various	yes	yes	Consisted of audio stories, specials, songs, toys and theme rides, etc. See also the Disney franchise.
The Witcher (Andrzej Sapkowski)	**The Witcher Stories**; The Saga novels	various	no	The Hexer (2001)	no	The Hexer (2002); The Witcher (2019–present)	The Witcher (2007); The Witcher 2: Assassins of Kings (2011); The Witcher 3: Wild Hunt (2014)	board and card games

== Franchises originating in comics and printed cartoons ==
Franchise (Creator)	Literature	Comics	Animated films	Live action films	Animated TV	Live action TV	Video games	Other media
300 (Frank Miller)	no	**300** (1998); Xerxes (2018)	yes	300 (2007); 300: Rise of an Empire (2014)	no	no	300: March to Glory (2007)	-
The Addams Family (Charles Addams)	several	**cartoons in The New Yorker** (1938–1988)	The Addams Family (2019); The Addams Family 2 (2021)	The Addams Family (1991); Addams Family Values (1993)	The Addams Family (1973–1975); The Addams Family: The Animated Series (1992–1993)	The Addams Family (1964–1966); The New Addams Family (1998–1999); Wednesday) (2022)	The Addams Family (video game series)	The Addams Family, a Broadway musical, toys, dolls, board games
Alien vs. Predator (see Aliens and Predator sections below)	Aliens vs. Predator novel series	**Aliens Versus Predator** comics (beginning 1989)	no	Alien vs. Predator (2004); Aliens vs. Predator: Requiem (2007)	no	no	various	Consisting of board games, action figures, theme park attractions, and pinball.
Archie Comics (John L. Goldwater)	no	**Archie Comics**, various series, beginning in 1941	The Archies in Jugman (TV Movie)	Archie: To Riverdale and Back Again (TV movie)	The Archie Show (1968–1969); Archie's Weird Mysteries (1999–2000) and many others	Riverdale (2017), Katy Keene (2020)	no	Radio show
Ashita no Joe (Asao Takamori and Tetsuya Chiba)	no	**Ashita no Joe** (1968–1973)	Ashita no Joe (1980); Ashita no Joe 2 (1981)	Ashita no Joe (1970); Ashita no Joe (2011)	Ashita no Joe (1970–1971); Ashita no Joe 2 (1980–1981); Megalo Box (2018); Megalo Box 2: Nomad (2021–)	no	yes	Joe vs. Joe (2003)
Asterix (René Goscinny and Albert Uderzo)	gamebooks	**Asterix the Gaul** (serialized in Pilote 1959–1960, collected volume published in 1961); 37 more volumes	List of Asterix films	Asterix films (live action)	Dogmatix and the Indomitables (2021); Asterix and Obelix: The Big Fight (2025)	no	yes	Parc Astérix theme park board games
Attack on Titan (Hajime Isayama)	yes	**Attack on Titan** (2009–present)	yes	yes	Attack on Titan (2013–present)	no	yes	Theme park Action Figures and Toys
The Beano (DC Thomson)	yes	**The Beano** (since 1936); Plug (1977-1979); Beano Specials (1987-1998); Fun Size Comics (1998-2010); EPIC Magazine (2007-2019); BeanOLD (2020)	yes	The Beano Video (1993); The Beano Videostars (1994)	Dennis and Grasher (1996–1998); Dennis and Gnasher (2009-2013); Dennis & Gnasher: Unleashed! (2017-2021)	The Beano's Dennis the Menace and Gnasher Show (1990-1991)	yes	Toys
Buck Rogers (Philip Francis Nowlan)	Buck Rogers: A Life in the Future (1995) several others	**yes**	no	Buck Rogers in the 25th Century (1979)	no	ABC television series (1950–1951); Buck Rogers in the 25th Century (1979–1981)	yes	Buck Rogers XXVC (1988) several others
Bleach (Tite Kubo)	2 light novels	List of **Bleach** volumes	Bleach: Memories of Nobody (2006); Bleach: The DiamondDust Rebellion (2007); Bleach: Fade to Black (2008); Bleach: Hell Verse (2010)	Bleach	Bleach (2004–2012)	no	several	musicals Bleach Trading Card Game
Cardcaptor Sakura (CLAMP)	no	**Cardcaptor Sakura** (1996-2000); Cardcaptor Sakura: Clear Card (2016-2024)	Cardcaptor Sakura: The Movie (1999); Cardcaptor Sakura Movie 2: The Sealed Card (2000)	no	Cardcaptor Sakura (1998-2000); Cardcaptor Sakura: Clear Card (2018)	no	several	Several audio dramas and character song singles
DC Universe (DC Comics) (includes Superman, Batman, and many others)	yes	**DC Comics**	yes	Superman and the Mole Men (1951) and numerous others	yes	yes	yes	Vertigo. (Sandman, Hellblazer, etc.) Imprint of DC. Has connections to the universe sometimes.
Death Note (Tsugumi Ohba)	several light novels	**Death Note** (2003–2006)	no	Death Note (2006); several others	yes	yes	several	-
Dennis the Menace(Hank Ketcham)	no	**Dennis the Menace** (1953–present)	Dennis the Menace in Mayday for Mother (1981); Dennis the Menace in Cruise Control (2002 TV film)	Dennis the Menace: Dinosaur Hunter (1987 TV film); Dennis the Menace (1993); Dennis the Menace Strikes Again (1998); A Dennis the Menace Christmas (2007)	Dennis the Menace (1986–1988); The All-New Dennis the Menace (1993)	Dennis the Menace (1959–1963)	Dennis the Menace (1993)	-
Detective Conan (Gosho Aoyama)	no	**volumes**	27 films	no	seasons 1-15 seasons 16-30 seasons 31–present	yes	yes	Trade cards
Doraemon (Fujiko Fujio)	no	List of **Doraemon** chapters The Doraemons; Dorabase	several	no	Doraemon (1973); Doraemon (1979−2005); Doremon (2005–present)	no	various	musical
Dragon Ball (Akira Toriyama)	yes	List of **Dragon Ball** manga volumes	yes	Dragonball Evolution (2009); several others	Dragon Ball (1986−1989); Dragon Ball Z (1989−1996); Dragon Ball GT (1996−1997); Dragon Ball Super (2015−2018); Dragon Ball Heroes (2018–present)	no	List of Dragon Ball video games	Toys; Action figures Collectible Card Game
Dyesebel (Mars Ravelo)	no	**Serialized in Pilipino Komiks** (1952–53)	no	several (1953, 1964, 1973, 1978, 1990, and 1996)	no	Dyesebel (2008); Dyesebel (2014)	no	
Fullmetal Alchemist (Hiromu Arakawa)	yes	List of Fullmetal Alchemist chapters	Fullmetal Alchemist the Movie: Conqueror of Shamballa (2012); Fullmetal Alchemist: The Sacred Star of Milos (2017)	Fullmetal Alchemist (2017)	Fullmetal Alchemist: Brotherhood Fullmetal Alchemist (TV series) (2003−2004)	no	yes	-
Garfield (Jim Davis)	no	**Garfield** (comic strip) (syndicated in 1978)	Garfield Gets Real (2007); Garfield's Fun Fest (2008); Garfield's Pet Force (2009); The Garfield Movie (2024) The Garfield Movie 2 (2027)	Garfield: The Movie (2004); Garfield: A Tail of Two Kitties (2006)	Garfield and Friends (1988–1994); The Garfield Show (2009–2016); Garfield Originals (2019-2020)	no	yes	-
Gaston (André Franquin)	no	**Gaston** (1957-1997, 2023-); Gastoon (2011-2012)	no	Fais gaffe à la gaffe! (1981) (Note: This adaption of the Gaston comic strip was created with the authorization of André Franquin. However, he did not give the filmmakers authorization to use the original names of the characters, so they were given new names for the film.); Gaston Lagaffe (2018)	Gaston (2009)	Merci Gaston! (1989)	M'enfin (1987)	-
Ghost in the Shell (Masamune Shirow)	no	**Ghost in the Shell** (1989–1990)	Ghost in the Shell (1995); Ghost in the Shell 2: Innocence (2004)	Ghost in the Shell (2017)	Ghost in the Shell: Stand Alone Complex (2002–2003)	no	Ghost in the Shell (1997); Ghost in the Shell: Stand Alone Complex (PS2) (2004)	original video animation
Hellboy (Mike Mignola)	various	List of **Hellboy** comics (1993−present)	Hellboy: Sword of Storms (2006); Hellboy: Blood and Iron (2007)	Hellboy (2004); Hellboy II: The Golden Army (2008); Hellboy (2019)	no	no	various	-
Initial D (Shuichi Shigeno)	no	List of **Initial D** chapters (1995−2013)	Initial D Third Stage (2001); New Initial D the Movie	Initial D (2005)	List of **Initial D** episodes	no	Several including Initial D Arcade Stage series	toys model kits soundtrack albums
Josie and the Pussycats	no	yes	no	Josie and the Pussycats (2001)	Josie and the Pussycats Josie and the Pussycats in Outer Space	no	no	
Judge Dredd (John Wagner)	29 Novels	List of Judge Dredd Comic Stories (1977−present)	no	Judge Dredd (film) (1995); Dredd (2012)	no	no	various	-
Kick-Ass (Mark Millar and John Romita Jr.)	no	**The Dave Lizewski Years** (2008–2014); The New Girl (2018–2019); Hit-Girl (2018–2020)	no	Kick-Ass (2010); Kick-Ass 2 (2013); Stuntnuts Does School Fight (TBA); Stuntnuts: The Movie (TBA)	no	no	Kick-Ass: The Game (2010); Kick-Ass 2: The Game (2014)	-
Lucky Luke (Morris)	no	**Lucky Luke comics** (1946–present); Rantanplan (1987–2011); Kid Lucky (1995–1997, 2011–present)	Daisy Town (1971); La Ballade des Dalton (1978); Les Dalton en cavale (1983); Go West! A Lucky Luke Adventure (2007)	Lucky Luke (1991); Les Dalton (2004); Lucky Luke (2009)	Lucky Luke (1983); Lucky Luke (1991); The New Adventures of Lucky Luke (2001–2003); Rintindumb (2006)	Lucky Luke (1992); The Daltons (2010)	several	
Lupin the Third (Monkey Punch)	No	List of Lupin III Manga (1977−present)	Lupin III, The Castle of Cagliostro, Legend of the Gold of Babylon, Lupin the 3rd vs. Detective Conan: The Movie, Lupin III: The First: (see Lupin III Cinema Films)	Lupin III: Strange Psychokinetic Strategy (2004); Lupin III (film) (2008); Dredd (2019)	Lupin III Anime Series	Lupin (Philippine TV series)	List of Lupin III video games	Two stage Musicals, Music Soundtrack. Board game
Marsupilami (André Franquin)	yes	**Marsupilami comic albums** (1987–present); Comics in Disney Adventures magazine (1993–1994)	no	HOUBA! On the Trail of the Marsupilami (2012); Marsupilami (2026)	Raw Toonage shorts (1992); Marsupilami (1993); Marsupilami (2000-)	no	Marsupilami (1995); Marsupilami: Hoobadventure (2021)	
Marvel Universe (Stan Lee, Jack Kirby, Steve Ditko, et al.) (includes Spider-Man, The Hulk, Iron Man, X-Men, Fantastic Four, and many others)	yes	**Marvel Comics**	yes	Captain America (1944); X-Men (2000); Spider-Man (2002); various See also Marvel Cinematic Universe	The Marvel Super Heroes (1966), numerous others	The Amazing Spider-Man (1977–1979); The Incredible Hulk (1977–1982) several others	Spider-Man (1982) and numerous others	Spider-Man: Turn Off the Dark (Broadway musical)
The Mask (Doug Mahnke and John Arcudi)	no	**The Mask** (1991–1995); The Mask Returns; The Mask Strikes Back	no	The Mask (1994); Son of the Mask (2005)	The Mask: Animated Series (1995–1997)	no	no	no
Men in Black (Lowell Cunningham)	no	**The Men in Black** (comics)	no	Men in Black (film series)	Men in Black: The Series	no	several	Men In Black: The Roleplaying Game
My Hero Academia (Kohei Horikoshi)	yes	List of **My Hero Academia** manga volumes	My Hero Academia: Two Heroes (2018)	no	My Hero Academia (2016–present)	no	yes	original video animations Toys; Action figures
Naruto/Boruto (Masashi Kishimoto, Mikio Ikemoto, Ukyō Kodachi)	several	List of **Naruto** manga volumes	yes	no	Naruto (2002–2007); Naruto Shippuuden (2007–2017); Rock Lee & His Ninja Pals (2012–2013); Boruto: Naruto Next Generations (2017–present)	no	several	Original video animations Trading card game
One Piece (Eiichiro Oda)	several	List of **One Piece** manga volumes (1997–present)	12 films	no	One Piece (1999–present)	One Piece (2023)	several	Original video animations music Trading card game
Patlabor (Headgear)	yes	Patlabor: The Movie (1989); Patlabor 2: The Movie (1993); WXIII: Patlabor the Movie 3 (2002)	The Next Generation Patlabor: Shuto Kessen (2015)	Patlabor on Television (1989−1990)	The Next Generation: Patlabor (2014–2015)	yes	**Patlabor: Early Days** (1988–1989 OVA); Patlabor: The New Files (1990–1992 OVA)	Patlabor Concert Tour '92: Project Tokyo soundtracks, toys, model kits
Peanuts (Charles M. Schulz)	several	**Peanuts** (1950–2000); numerous compilation books; comic books by Gold Key and KaBoom!; graphic novels by KaBoom!	A Boy Named Charlie Brown (1969); Snoopy Come Home (1972); Race for Your Life, Charlie Brown (1977); Bon Voyage, Charlie Brown (and Don't Come Back!!) (1980); The Peanuts Movie (2015)	no	several TV specials since 1965, starting with A Charlie Brown Christmas; The Charlie Brown and Snoopy Show (1983–1986); This Is America, Charlie Brown (1988–1989); Peanuts (2014); Snoopy in Space (2019–present); The Snoopy Show (2021–present)	It's the Girl in the Red Truck, Charlie Brown (TV special)	several	A Charlie Brown Christmas (1965 album) and several other albums musicals
Popeye the Sailor (Elzie Crisler Segar)	no	**Thimble Theatre** comic strips; various	yes	Popeye (1980)	numerous	no	yes	-
Ranma ½ (Rumiko Takahashi)	no	**Ranma ½** (1987–1996)	Three films	TV special (2011)	yes	no	List of Ranma ½ video games	original video animations
Sabrina the Teenage Witch	no	yes	yes	yes	yes	yes		
Sailor Moon (Naoko Takeuchi)	no	List of **Sailor Moon** chapters (1993–1997)	Sailor Moon R: The Movie (1993); Sailor Moon S: The Movie (1994); Sailor Moon Super S: The Movie (1995)	no	Sailor Moon (1992–1996); Sailor Moon Crystal (2014–2016)	Pretty Guardian Sailor Moon (2003–2004)	several	musicals
Saint Seiya (Masami Kurumada)	yes	List of **Saint Seiya** chapters (series) several others	Five films	no	Saint Seiya (1986−1989); Saint Seiya Omega (2012−2014)	no	several	Original video animations musicals discography merchandise
Sam & Max (Steve Purcell)	no	**Sam & Max: Freelance Police** (1987) several others	no	no	The Adventures of Sam & Max: Freelance Police	no	Sam & Max: Hit the Road (1993); Sam & Max: Save the World (2007) several others	soundtracks
Sgt. Frog (Mine Yoshizaki)	yes	List of **Sgt. Frog** chapters (1999–present) various tie-ins and spinoffs	Keroro Gunsō the Super Movie (2006); four other films	no	Sgt. Frog/Sergeant Keroro (2004–2011); Keroro (2014)	no	several	music CDs; Keroro Land magazine Kerokero Ace magazine
The Smurfs (Peyo)	yes	**Johan and Peewit**; The Smurfs (comics)	Les Aventures des Schtroumpfs (1965); The Smurfs and the Magic Flute (1976); Smurfs: The Lost Village (2017)	The Smurfs (2011); The Smurfs 2 (2013); Smurfs (2025)	The Smurfs (1981–89)	no	yes	yes
Spawn (Todd McFarlane)	no	**Spawn** (1992–present); Shadows of Spawn (1998–1999) various spin-offs, one-shots, crossovers, mini series, and ongoing series	no	Spawn (1997)	Todd McFarlane's Spawn (1997–1999)	no	several	The Dark Saga (1996)
Spirou/Spirou & Fantasio (Rob-Vel)	yes	**Comics in Spirou magazine** (1938–present); Spirou & Fantasio albums (1948–present); Le Petit Spirou (1990–present) (spin-off)	no	Les aventures de Spirou et Fantasio (2018); Le Petit Spirou (2017) (spin-off adaption)	Spirou (1993–1994); Two of a Kind: Spirou and Fantasio (2006–2009); Spirou and co (series of animated shorts); Le Petit Spirou (2012–present) (spin-off adaption)	no	Spirou (1995); Spirou: The Robot Invasion (2000)	Parc Spirou theme park audio plays
Teenage Mutant Ninja Turtles (Kevin Eastman and Peter Laird)	no	**Teenage Mutant Ninja Turtles** (1984–2009) various	TMNT (2007); Turtles Forever (2009); Batman vs. Teenage Mutant Ninja Turtles (2019); Rise of the Teenage Mutant Ninja Turtles: The Movie (2022); Teenage Mutant Ninja Turtles: Mutant Mayhem (2023); Untitled Teenage Mutant Ninja Turtles: Mutant Mayhem Sequel (2027)	Teenage Mutant Ninja Turtles (1990); Teenage Mutant Ninja Turtles II: The Secret of the Ooze (1991); Teenage Mutant Ninja Turtles III (1993); Teenage Mutant Ninja Turtles (2014); Teenage Mutant Ninja Turtles: Out of the Shadows (2016); Untitled Teenage Mutant Ninja Turtles film (2028)	Teenage Mutant Ninja Turtles (1987–1996); Teenage Mutant Ninja Turtles (2003–2009); Teenage Mutant Ninja Turtles (2012–2017); Rise of the Teenage Mutant Ninja Turtles (2018–2019)	Ninja Turtles: The Next Mutation (1997–1998)	yes	merchandise cereal apparel
Tintin (Hergé)	no	**cartoons in Le Vingtième Siècle** (1929–1939); The Adventures of Tintin series	five animated films	Tintin and the Mystery of the Golden Fleece (1961); Tintin and the Blue Oranges (1964)	Hergé's Adventures of Tintin; The Adventures of Tintin	no	yes	radio shows musical stage play
Turok (Rex Maxon)	4 novels	**Turok: Son of Stone** (1956–1982; 2010–2011); Turok: Dinosaur Hunter (1993–1996; 2014-); Turok (1998)	yes	no	no	no	Turok (series)	-
The Walking Dead (Robert Kirkman and Tony Moore)	3 novels	**The Walking Dead** (2003–present)	yes	no	no	The Walking Dead TV series (2010–present)	The Walking Dead (2012); The Walking Dead: Survival Instinct (2013)	-
Wangan Midnight (Michiharu Kusunoki)	no	**Wangan Midnight** (1990–2008); Wangan Midnight: C1 Runner (2009–2012); Ginkai no Speed Star (2014–2015); Shutoko SPL - Ginkai no Speedster (2016–present)	no	12 direct-to-video movies (1991–2001); Wangan Midnight The Movie (2009)	Wangan Midnight (2007–2008)	no	Wangan Midnight (2001); Wangan Midnight R (2001) Wangan Midnight (2007) Wangan Midnight Maximum Tune series (2004–present)	toys model kits
Yu-Gi-Oh! (Kazuki Takahashi)	yes	**Yu-Gi-Oh!** (1996–2004); Yu-Gi-Oh! R (2004–2008) several	Yu-Gi-Oh! (1999); Yu-Gi-Oh! The Movie: Pyramid of Light (2004); Yu-Gi-Oh!: Bonds Beyond Time (2010); Yu-Gi-Oh!: The Dark Side of Dimensions (2016)	no	Yu-Gi-Oh! (1998); Yu-Gi-Oh! Duel Monsters (2000–2004); Yu-Gi-Oh! GX (2004–2008) several	no	several	Yu-Gi-Oh! Trading Card Game

== See also ==
- List of fictional shared universes in film and television – many multimedia franchises are based in fictional universes
- List of public domain works with multimedia adaptations
- List of highest-grossing media franchises
- Media mix
