= Wannabe Wicked =

Wannabe Wicked is a talent competition conceived for fans of the musical Wicked. Contestants compete in a series of performances judged by industry professionals, and those who perform successfully move on later rounds. The criteria that must be met in order to succeed is based on vocal quality, performance delivery, vocal accuracy and overall performance. In the end, the winner receives a walk-on role onto the hit musical Wicked.

== Origins of Wannabe Wicked ==
The concept for Wicked fans to experience a day in a life of a Wicked performer originated in Great Britain with fans submitting auditions videos singing an excerpt of a song from the musical. From those videos, a select few were chosen to compete in later rounds. The winner of the Wannabe Wicked contest in Great Britain was Louise Henderson. She won a walk-on role and was able to experience the many aspects of the daily routine of the Wicked performers.

== Wannabe Wicked in North America ==
The Wannabe Wicked contest made its way to Los Angeles, California in the summer of 2008. It involved a series of three rounds that the contestants had to contend with, which consisted of the video audition, semi-finals live performance at City Walk at Universal Studios Hollywood, and the finals live performance at City Walk at Universal Studios Hollywood. All of this was part of the Wicked Wednesday summer series at Universal Studios.

Contestants chosen from the video auditions were notified of their day to perform live in the semi-finals. The performances for the semi-finals and finals were to be judged by top industry professionals. There were five days of semi-finals competition each with a total of ten contestants. At the end of each of the semi-final rounds, three contestants were selected to move onto the final round, which was held on August 20, 2008. There were a total of fifteen contestants that performed during the finals, and the talent was fierce. Prior to the finals, a separate contest, which was called the Fan Favorite, was posted online to showcase all the finalists' performances from the semi-finals. Online viewers were given the option to vote for their favorite performer.

As great as the performances were on the online videos, the finals revealed a more ready, talented and ferocious group of performers, which was not reflective of what was seen online. The contestants all performed ultimately better than what was seen from the semi-finals. Every contestant brought their own personalities to their songs, and performed in front of a massive crowd showing off what they were made to do. One contestant, Kingsley Malang, was noted by the emcee as being the only male of the competition to perform a song written for the part of a female, in which he succeeded. His performance included the actual blocking that Elphaba performs from the stage production.

Local news media was also present at the event capturing all the performances in anticipation of the selected winner. NBC was one of the media presences that took coverage of the event.

== Fan Favorite ==
Not only was a winner for the walk-on role to be selected but also a fan favorite. The fan favorite was determined by an online site, which showcased the semi-final performances of each of the fifteen contestants and allowed people to vote for their favorite. On August 20, 2008, the fan favorite was announced along with the winner of the walk-on role. Dawn Borroso was the lucky winner of the fan favorite.

== The Contestant Lineup ==
The following shows the contestants and the song they performed in no particular order:

| Contestant 1 | Contestant 2 | Contestant 3 | Contestant 4 | Contestant 5 | Contestant 6 | Contestant 7 | Contestant 8 | Contestant 9 | Contestant 10 | Contestant 11 | Contestant 12 | Contestant 13 | Contestant 14 | Contestant 15 |
|---|---|---|---|---|---|---|---|---|---|---|---|---|---|---|
| Cameron Ernst | Chelsea Dyer | Chelsea Emma Franko (Note: Franko would eventually join the 2nd US Tour as the Elphaba Standby) | Christine Capsuto | Connie Zamora | Kingsley Malang | Tiffany Nutter | Paul Zappia | Daniella Painton | Dawn Barroso | Emily Yates | Holly Jones | Lisa Sadowski | - | Nura Creitz |
| Dancing Through Life | Defying Gravity | The Wizard and I | Popular | For Good | The Wizard and I | The Wizard and I | Dancing Through Life | The Wizard and I | Defying Gravity | The Wizard and I | For Good | Defying Gravity | For Good | The Wizard and I |

Contestants were given the choice of singing the following excerpts from the musical:

- Popular
- Defying Gravity
- The Wizard and I
- Dancing Through Life
- For Good

== The Winner ==
Despite the immense talent that was showcased, only one winner was to be chosen. There was a panel of five judges consisting of industry professionals during the finals, and they were hard pressed to come to a decision. Ultimately, the crowd waited in suspense as the winner was announced. The winner, Connie Zamora, not only won a walk-on role in the Los Angeles production of Wicked at the Pantages Theater but also won several tickets to bring anyone she chooses to come watch at the time of her performance. The local news media was ready to capture her excitement upon the conclusion and results of the competition.
