= List of Saint Seiya chapters (series) =

Covers of the first volume of Saint Seiya: the Japanese edition by Shueisha (left) and the English one by Viz Media

Saint Seiya is a Japanese manga written and drawn by Masami Kurumada. The plot follows a Japanese teenager named Seiya who becomes one of the 88 soldiers for the goddess Athena, named Saints. The Saints have the ability to use energy from the universe, and use it to fight against any person who attacks Athena.

The individual chapters were published by Shueisha in the magazine Weekly Shōnen Jump from January 1, 1986 to November 19, 1990. They were also and compiled into 28 tankōbon volumes. The first volume was released in September 1986, and volume 28 was released in April 1991. In addition to the original volumes, the series has been reissued four times. The first reissue was in 1995 with the Aizōban the "Collector's Version". The second reissue was as 15 bunkoban volumes in 2001 called the "Library Version". The first eighteen volumes of the manga series were adapted into a 114-episode anime series by Toei Animation, while a series of OVAs adapted the following volumes in 31 episodes.

The series was re-released in 2003 in 19 volumes with Setteis from the anime adaptation called the "Remix Version". The fourth reissue, in 22 volumes, called the "Complete Version" which contains additional colored pages as well as colored armor schematics. In addition, the "Remix Version" was republished at the end of 2007 to coincide with the broadcast of Chapter Elysion of the anime. Viz Media has licensed the manga for release in North America under their Shonen Jump imprint. Shonen Jump has changed the covers and added Knights of the Zodiac to the volumes to make Saint Seiya: Knights of the Zodiac. The first volume of the series was released on January 21, 2004, and as of February 2, 2010 all twenty-eight volumes have been released.

A sequel by Kurumada, Saint Seiya: Next Dimension, was published from 2006 to 2024.

== Volumes ==
No.	Title	Original release date	English release date
1	Holy Warriors; Athena's Saints (女神の聖闘士 Atena no Seinto)	September 10, 1986; 4-08-851754-7	January 21, 2004; 1-59116-225-4
001. "The Saints of Athena" (女神の聖闘士, Atena no Seinto); 002. "The Pegasus Cloth" (ペガサスの聖衣, Pegasasu no Kurosu); 003. "The Golden Cloth" (黄金聖衣, Gōrudo Kurosu); 004. "The Galaxian Wars" (銀河戦争, Gyarakushan Wōzu)
A Japanese teenager named Seiya, is training in Greece to win an armor known as "Cloth" which was originally from the 88 warriors called "Saints" from the goddess Athena. By awakening the energy called Cosmo, which covers all the universe, Seiya easily defeats his opponent Cassios in Athena's Sanctuary, winning the Pegasus Bronze Cloth. However Seiya and his teacher Marin are attacked by the Saint Shaina the following night, who does not want Seiya to take the Cloth. Using the Pegasus Cloth, Seiya defeats Shaina, and then returns to his homeland, Japan. There, he tries to find his older sister, whom he was separated by a deceased man, Mitsumasa Kido, to become a Saint. His granddaughter, Saori Kido, tells him that if he participates in a competition against 9 other Bronze Saints, they will search for his sister. In the first fight, Seiya faces Bear Geki, whom he defeats after breaking his arms.
2	Axia! Death Match! Pegasus vs. Dragon (死闘！天馬対龍 Shitō! Pegasasu tai Doragon)	January 9, 1987; 4-08-851755-5	March 24, 2004; 1-59116-226-2
005. "Cygnus — The Tundra Warrior" (キグナス 氷原の戦士, Kigunasu Hyōgen no Senshi); 006. "Dragon — The Indestructible Shield and Gauntlet" (ドラゴン 最強の盾と拳, Doragon Saikyō no Tate to Ken); 007. "Death Match! Pegasus vs. Dragon" (死闘！天馬対龍, Shitō! Pegasasu tai Doragon); 008. "Axia!" (AXIA!, Akushia!)
Hyōga, a Russian teenager, finishes his training in Russia, and obtains the Cygnus Bronze Cloth. He then receives an order from the Sanctuary to kill all the Saints fighting in Japan. As such, Hyōga enters the tournament and defeats Hydra Ichi by using his freezing Cosmo. In the next match Seiya faces the Dragon Saint, Shiryū, who manages to destroy his Cloth. Seeing that Shiryū's shield is unbreakable, Seiya tricks Shiryū to destroy his shield with his own arm protector, and both end fighting without Cloths. Seiya discovers Shiryū's weak point and is able to defeat him. In the next fight, Andromeda Shun easily overpowers Unicorn Jabu by using his Andromeda Chains, but they are both interrupted by the Phoenix Saint.
3	Mu's Palace; Phoenix, the Warrior from Hell (フェニックス!地獄よりの戦士 Fenikkusu! Jigoku Yori no Senshi)	March 10, 1987; 4-08-851756-3	May 19, 2004; 1-59116-299-8
009. "Phoenix — The Warrior from Hell!" (フェニックス！地獄よりの戦士, Fenikkusu! Jigoku Yori no Senshi); 010. "The Stolen Gold Cloth" (うばわれた黄金聖衣, Ubawareta Gōrudo Kurosu"); 011. "The Four Black Saints Appear" (暗黒四天王！登場, Burakku Fō! Tōjō); 012. "The Tower of Mu" (ムウの館, Mū no Yakata)
The Phoenix Saint, Ikki, is revealed to be Shun's older brother, and he also wants to kill all the orphans that were sent to become Saints because his training place, the Death Queen Island, was the worst place he could be sent. Ikki attacks Shun and steals the Gold Cloth, the strongest type of Cloth which was supposed to be given to the winner, and runs away. Seiya, Shun, Hyōga and Shiryū try to stop him, but they are stopped by Ikki's soldiers, the Black Saints. Together they defeat the Black Saints and retrieve some pieces of the Gold Cloth. To prepare to their fight against Ikki, Shiryū goes to Jamir, where he can repair the Pegasus and Dragon Cloths. Ikki soon challenges the Bronze Saints to fight in Mount Fuji, but Shiryū does not appear. However, Seiya finds the Pegasus Cloth rebuilt in the Aokigahara caves from Fuji.
4	Remembering the Rage; Bloodbath! The Black Cloth (血戦!暗黒聖衣 Ketsusen! Burakku Kurosu)	May 8, 1987; 4-08-851757-1	July 14, 2004; 1-59116-335-8
013. "The Terror of the Black Death Punch" (黒死拳の恐怖, Kokushiken no Kyōfu); 014. "A Cold End! Cygnus vs. Phoenix" (凄絶！白鳥対鳳凰, Seizetsu! Hakuchō tai Hōō); 015. "Shun! The Angry Nebula" (瞬！怒りの星雲, Shun! Ikari no Nebyura); 016. "A Battle of Titans — Dragon vs. Dragon" (激闘！龍対龍, Gekitō! Ryū tai Ryū); 017. "The Memory of Hate" (憎しみの記憶, Nikushimi no Kioku)
Seiya meets a little boy named Kiki, who explains him that his master, Mu, could repair the Cloths, but Shiryū had to lose most of his blood to do it, and thus, he is in a critical state. Seiya, Shun and Hyōga separate, and enter into different caves. Seiya faces the Black Pegasus Saint, and although he defeats him, he is seriously injured by one of his attacks. Meanwhile, Hyōga finds the Black Cygnus and defeats without problems. He then finds Ikki and starts fighting against him. Having received a message from Black Cygnus, Ikki easily overpowers Hyōga, and then attacks his brain to paralyze him. As Hyōga is defeated, Shun finds Seiya injured and tries to save him. He is attacked by Black Andromeda, and Shun is forced to defeat him. However, Shun is then attacked by Black Dragon, but Shiryū appears to fight him. Although being still weak, Shiryū overpowers Black Dragon, who accepts his defeat. The three Bronze Saints then find Ikki. Hyōga also appears there, showing that a cross from his mother saved him. Hyōga then reflects Ikki's attack to make him reminisces how much he suffered while training.
5	Burn, Phoenix! Silver Saint: The Gorgeous Assassin (白銀聖衣!美しき抹殺者 Shirubā Seinto! Utsukushiki Hittoman)	July 10, 1987; 4-08-851758-X	September 7, 2004; 1-59116-470-2
018. "The Memory of Death Queen Island" (デスクイーン島の追憶, Desukuīntō no Tsuioku); 019. "Ashes of the Phoenix!" (不死鳥よ灰となれ！, Fushichō yo Haito Nare!); 020. "Silver Saint: The Gorgeous Assassin" (白銀聖衣！美しき抹殺者, Shirubā Kurosu! Utsukushiki Hittoman); 021. "Medals of Men" (男の勲章, Otoko no Kunshō)
Ikki continues reminiscing how he searched for the Phoenix Cloth, by killing his teacher, and by defeating the Black Saints. However, Ikki shows no reaction to his own attack, and furiously pummels the Bronze Saints. Seiya is saved by the Gold Cloth, which allows Shiryū, Shun and Hyōga to give their Cosmo to Seiya. Seiya defeats Ikki, who realizes he has been selfish all time since all the other orphans also suffered while training. Then Mount Fuji is then attacked by an unknown enemy, and before it collapses, Ikki reveals to Seiya that every orphan is a son of Mitsumasa Kido, and thus they are all half brothers. Seiya is then transported by Mu to a beach, but he is suddenly attacked by Silver Saints, who are the middle rank between Bronze and Gold Saints. Seiya's teacher, Marin, also attacks him, but she escapes. Seiya is then confronted by the Silver Saint Lizard Misty, who easily overpowers Seiya. Then, Seiya develops new techniques, and is able to kill Misty.
6	Fight for Athena; Tatakae! Atena no Moto de (戦え!女神のもとで)	September 10, 1987; 4-08-851759-8	November 15, 2004; 1-59116-525-3
022. "The Cards of Resurrection" (復活の聖闘士カード, Fukkatsu no Seinto Kādo); 023. "Seiya's Furious Attack!" (星矢 怒りの攻撃！, Seiya Ikari no Atakku!); 024. "To Fight For Athena!" (戦え！女神のもとで, Tatakae! Atena no Moto de)
Hyōga defeats the Silver Saint Centaurus Babel and reveals the other Bronze Saints are alive as well. The Silver Saints Whale Moses and Hound Asterion try to kill Marin, but Seiya arrives to rescue her. After several fights, the Silver Saints are defeated, and Marin leaves a message to Seiya telling him to protect Athena. Seiya then reunites with Shiryū, Shun and Hyōga, and they return the Sagittarius Gold Cloth to Saori. Saori reveals to the Saints that the Pope from the Sanctuary has become evil, and the former owner of the Gold Cloth rescued her when she was a baby. She then reveals that she is the reincarnation from Athena, but none of the Saints believe her. Suddenly, another Silver Saint, Crow Jamian, kidnaps Saori, but he is stopped by the Bronze Saints. As Seiya and Saori are followed by Shaina and Jamian, Seiya jumps from a mountain while protecting Saori, but he ends up seriously injured. Three more Silver Saints attack Saori, but they are confronted by Ikki.
7	For a Wonderful Future; Clash! The Gold Cloth (激突!黄金聖衣 Gekitotsu! Gōrudo Kurosu)	November 10, 1987; 4-08-851760-1	January 4, 2005; 1-59116-616-0
025. "For a Magnificent Future" (大いなる未来のために, Ooinaru Mirai no Tameni); 026. "Leo Aiolia's Challenge" (獅子座アイオリアの挑戦, Leo Aioria no Chōsen); 027. "Clash! The Gold Cloth" (激突！黄金聖衣, Gekitotsu! Gōrudo Kurosu)
Ikki defeats the Silver Saints, and leaves Saori and Seiya to Shun, Hyōga and Shiryū. Then, the group is attacked by the Silver Saint Perseus Algol, who turns most of them into stone with his Medusa Shield. To avoid seeing the shield, Shiryū injures his own eyes, but becomes blind. He then defeats Algol, making all his friends return to normal. A few days later, Shaina attacks a hospitalized Seiya, but they are suddenly confronted by the Gold Saint Leo Aiolia, the younger brother of the deceased Sagittarius Aiolos. Aiolia's lightspeed powers are enough to defeat Seiya, but Shaina intercepts his attack and reveals that she is in love with Seiya. Seiya is then attacked by three Silver Saints, but the Sagittarius Cloth suddenly appears, protecting Seiya. Although he defeats the three Silver Saints donning the Gold Cloth, Seiya is knocked out by Aiolia. Saori appears and tells Aiolia what happened with his brother, Aiolos. As such, Aiolia returns to the Sanctuary and attacks the Pope.
8	The 12 Palaces; Sanctuary's Twelve Palaces (聖域!十二の宮殿 Sankuchuari! Jūni no Kyūden)	January 8, 1988; 4-08-851761-X	March 1, 2005; 1-59116-715-9
028. "A Time For Battle" (決戦の時, Kessen no Toki); 029. "Sanctuary! The Twelve Palaces" (聖域！十二の宮殿, Sankuchuari! Jūni no Kyūden); 030. "Battle in the Golden Bull Palace" (金牛宮の戦闘, Kingyūkyū no Batoru); 031. "Gemini's Labyrinth" (双子座の迷宮, Jemini no Meikyū)
The Cancer Gold Saint Deathmask goes to China to kill Shiryū and his teacher, who is revealed as the former Libra Gold Saint. However, he is interrupted by the Aries Gold Saint Mu, and retreats. Shiryū returns to Japan and prepares to go to the Sanctuary to defeat the Pope along with Seiya, Hyōga, Shun and Saori. As they arrive, they are attacked by a Silver Saint who injures Saori with a golden arrow. Having only 12 hours to save Saori, the Saints go to the twelve temples from the Sanctuary to find the Pope and ask him to save her. In the Aries Temple, Mu tells them about the Cosmo from the Gold Saint, and in the Taurus Temple they are confronted by Taurus Aldebaran. Seiya awakens the 7th sense, a Cosmo used by the Gold Saints, and manages to overpower Aldebaran. As such the Bronze Saints are allowed to continue, and arrive the Gemini Temple. In the temple, the Gemini Saint creates illusions to stop them from continuing.
9	For My Goddess; Waga Megami no Tameni (我が女神のために)	March 10, 1988; 4-08-851762-8	May 3, 2005; 1-59116-786-8
032. "Gemini's Illusion" (双子座の幻影, Jemini no Gen'ei); 033. "Mortal Combat in the Cancer Palace" (巨蟹宮の死闘, Kyokaikyū no Shitō); 034. "For My Goddess" (我が女神のために, Waga Megami no Tameni)
Being blind, Shiryū discovers the Gemini Saint is not in the temple, and escapes along with Seiya. However, Hyōga and Shun are still attacked by illusions, causing Hyōga to be transported to the Libra Temple. Shun's chains manage to injure the real Gemini Saint, and the illusions disappear. In the Libra Temple, Hyōga is attacked by his teacher, the Aquarius Gold Saint Camus, who traps him in a frozen coffin to avoid him being killed. Meanwhile, in the Cancer Temple, Shiryū faces Deathmask allowing Seiya to continue. Shiryū also awakens his 7th sense and kills Deathmask, recovering his vision. In the Leo Temple, Seiya is attacked by Aiolia who is being controlled by the Pope. Shaina's student, Cassios, goes to the Leo Temple, and allows Aiolia to kill him so that the control from the Pope is broken.
10	The Man Closest to Godhood; Shaka, the Man Closest to Godhood (シャカ!神に近い男 Shaka! Kami ni Chikai Otoko)	May 10, 1988; 4-08-851763-6	July 5, 2005; 1-59116-851-1
035. "Shaka! The Godlike Saint" (シャカ！もっとも神に近い男, Shaka! Kami ni Chikai Otoko); 036. "The Secret of the Libra Cloth" (天秤座の聖衣の秘密, Raibura no Kurosu no Himitsu); 037. "Scorpion vs. Cygnus" (蠍対白鳥, Sasori tai Hakuchō)
Seiya, Shun and Shiryū go to the Virgo Temple where they are easily defeated by Virgo Shaka. Ikki comes to their rescue, but he is unable to defeat Shaka. Then, Ikki awakens his 7th sense and attacks Shaka, making both disappear. Seiya, Shun and Shiryū continue to the Libra Temple and manage to save Hyōga by preventing the use of the Libra Cloth weapons to destroy the frozen coffin. Shun then stays to give his Cosmo to Hyōga. In the Scorpio Temple, Scorpio Milo faces Seiya and Shiryū, but Hyōga also appears to confront Milo.
11	The Absolute Zero; Young Men! To You I Entrust Athena (少年たちよ!女神を託す Shōnen Tachi yo! Atena wo Takusu)	July 8, 1988; 4-08-851764-4	September 6, 2005; 1-59116-993-3
038. "Only Death Can Stop Us!" (死すとも進む！, Shisutomo Susumu!); 039. "Young men! To You I Entrust Athena!" (少年たちよ！女神を託す, Shōnen Tachi yo! Atena o Takusu); 040. "Shura! The Man Who Wields Excalibur" (シュラ！聖剣をもつ男, Shura! Ekusukaribā o Motsu Otoko); 041. "The Ultimate Frozen air! The Absolute Zero" (究極の凍気！絶対零度, Kyūkyoku no Tōki! Zettai Reido)
Although Hyōga is unable to defeat Milo, he is allowed to continue since Milo starts believing he fights for a good reason. After going through the empty Saggitarius and Capricorn Temples, the Bronze Saints are attacked by Capricorn Shura. Shiryū faces him, but as none of his techniques are able to defeat Shura, he performs a forbidden move to fly with Shura until both would be burned in the atmosphere. Hyōga stays in the Aquarius Temple to fight Camus, and this time he is able awake his 7th sense. Hyōga manages to defeat Camus, but he falls to the floor, making Seiya and Shun suspect he died.
12	Man with Two Faces; Death Match in the Pope's Chamber (教皇の間の死闘 Kyōkō no ma no Shitō)	September 9, 1988; 4-08-851765-2	November 8, 2005; 1-4215-0117-1
042. "The Funeral Procession of Roses" (バラの葬列, Bara no Sōretsu); 043. "Death Match in the Pope's Chamber!" (教皇の間の死闘！, Kyōkō no ma no Shitō!); 044. "Gemini: The Man With Two Faces" (ジェミニ！ふたつの顔をもつ男, Jemini! Futatsu no Kao o Motsu Otoko)
Seiya and Shun arrive the last temple, where they are confronted by Pisces Aphrodite. Shun fights Aphrodite, while Seiya goes to the Pope's room. As Shun's Cloth is broken while fighting Aphrodite, he uses his Cosmo to create a burning stream to attack Aphrodite. Shun manages to win, but he is unable to continue. Seiya falls unconscious while going to the Pope's room due to Aphrodite's poisoned roses being in the way. Marin saves him, and Seiya confronts the Pope. The Pope tells Seiya that he can save Saori using the shield from Athena's statue, but he suddenly attacks Seiya, revealing he is the Gemini Saint. Mu transports Shaka and Ikki back to the Sanctuary, and Ikki is allowed to go to the Pope's room to save Seiya.
13	Athena Revives; Atena Fukkatsu (女神復活)	November 10, 1988; 4-08-851766-0	January 3, 2006; 1-4215-0236-4
045. "His Name is Saga!" (その名はサガ！, Sono na wa Saga!); 046. "Athena Revives!!" (女神復活！！, Atena Fukkatsu!!); Omake. "The Swan's Tale: Natassja of the Lands of Ice" (THE CYGNUS STORY 氷の国のナターシャ, The Cygnus Story — Kōri no Kuni no Natāsha)
Ikki fights the Gemini Saint named Saga, but is unable to defeat him. Shiryū's teacher explains to all the Gold Saints that Saga has two sides: one evil and one good. When the evil side took control of Saga, he killed the previous Pope to take his rank. Ikki's body disappears due to an attack from Saga, but Seiya stands up to knock him out. As he awakes, Saga finds Seiya holding Athena's shield, and is attacked by the light from the shield. The light also heals Saori, who goes running to the Twelve Temples to find the dead Bronze Saints. She finds Saga whose evil side was destroyed by the shield, and sees him commit suicide for the crimes he made.
14	Temple Under the Sea; The Coronation of Emperor Poseidon (戴冠!海皇ポセイドン! Taikan!! Kaiō Poseidon)	January 10, 1989; 4-08-851767-9	March 7, 2006; 1-4215-0418-9
047. "The Undersea Temple" (海底神殿, Kaitei Shinden); 048. "The Melody of Death" (死の旋律, Shi no Merodi); 049. "The Coronation of Poseidon" (戴冠！！海皇ポセイドン！, Taikan!! Kaiō Poseidon!); 050. "Resurrection! New Cloths" (復活！新生聖衣, Fukkatsu! Nyū Kurosu)
Soldiers from the Seas God Poseidon try to kidnap Saori, but they are stopped by her Saints. Aldebaran faces one of Poseidon's generals, Siren Sorento, but both are interrupted by Saori. Saori then goes to Poseidon's temple, where she meets the god. Although Poseidon tells her that he will use his power to make rain around to world to destroy mankind, thinking that mankind is destroying the planet. he allows Saori to stay in the central pillar from his temple to absorb all the rain. Still recovering form the fight against the Gold Saints, Seiya, Shiryū, Shun and Hyōga go to Poseidon's temple, where they are told that the only way to save Saori is to destroy the seven pillars from the temple, and then the central pillar. As they separate, Seiya faces General Sea Horse Baian who protects the North Pacific Ocean's Mammoth Pillar.
15	Deadly Battle; Undersea Temple! The Seven Pillars (海底神殿!七本の柱 Kaitei Shinden! Nanahon no Hashira)	March 10, 1989; 4-08-851768-7	June 2, 2006; 1-4215-0656-4
051. "The Gold-hued Bronze Cloth" (黄金色の青銅聖衣！, Kin'iro no Buronzu Kurosu!); 052. "Death Match! The South Pacific Pillar" (死闘！南太平洋の柱, Shitō! Saosu Pashifikku Pirā); 053. "The Golden Chains" (黄金色の鎖, Kin'iro no Chēn); 054. "The Golden Lance vs. Excalibur" (黄金の槍V.S.聖剣, Gōruden no Ransu bāsasu Ekusukaribā)
Seiya easily defeats Baian as his Pegasus Cloth now has the power from the Gold Cloths. He then proceeds to destroy the pillar using the Libra Cloth which was brought by Kiki. At the same time, Shun fights the guardian from the South Pacific Ocean's pillar, Scylla Io. As Scylla creates beasts with Cosmo, Shun defeats all of them with his Andromeda Chain, which takes form of objects. Shun defeats Scylla and destroys his pillar with the Libra Cloth. Meanwhile, Shiryū fights Chrysaor Krishna, who is the guardian of the Indian Ocean Mammoth Pillar. As Chrysaor's lance overpowers Shiryū, Shiryū awakes Excalibur, a "sword" in his right arm that Shura gave him before dying in the atmosphere.
16	The Heart Hunter; Kokoro no Karyūdo (心の狩人)	May 10, 1989; 4-08-851769-5	July 5, 2006; 1-4215-0659-9
055. "Sever the Star Life Points!" (星命点を斬れ！, Seimeiten o Kire!); 056. "The Soul Hunter" (心の狩人, Kokoro no Karyūdo); 057. "The Avenging Anger" (怒りの報復, Ikari no Hōfuku); 058. "Isaac! The Frozen Comrade" (アイザック！凍りついた旧友, Aizakku! Kōritsuita Kyūyū)
Using Excalibur, Shiryū manages to defeat Chrysaor and destroys the pillar. However, he ends up seriously injured and is unable to continue. Shun finds Seiya and Hyōga knocked around the Antarctic Ocean Mammoth Pillar, and is attacked by the guardian Lyumnades Caça. Lyumnades can transform into anybody he wants, and knocks Shun, after transforming into Ikki. The real Ikki appears to save him, and faces Lyumnades. Ikki easily kills Lyumnades as none of the transformations affect him. As Ikki destroys the pillar, Hyōga awakes and heads to destroy the Arctic Ocean Mammoth Pillar, being embarrassed from his previous defeat. He discovers that the guardian is his childhood friend, Kraken Isaac, who lost an eye while protecting Hyōga from a strong current in Siberia.
17	Athena's prayer Athena's Prayers Reverberate (響け!女神の祈り Hibike! Atena no Inori)	July 10, 1989; 4-08-851770-9	September 5, 2006; 1-4215-0660-2
059. "Till We Meet Again in Death, Friend..." (友よ 死してまた, Tomo yo Shishite Mata); 060. "Gemini Returns!" (双子座！ふたたび, Jemini! Futatabi); 061. "Athena's Prayers Reverberate!" (響け！女神の祈り, Hibike! Atena no Inori); 062. "Discord! The Two Souls" (相剋！ふたつの魂, Sōkoku! Futatsu no Tamashii)
Hyōga decides to fight Isaac after Isaac attempts to kill Kiki to take the Libra Cloth. Hyōga kills Isaac and destroys the pillar. While going to Poseidon's temple, Ikki is attacked by General Sea Dragon, who is revealed to be Gemini Kanon, Saga's twin brother. Kanon easily sends Ikki to another dimension reducing the number of Saints fighting Poseidon. Seiya, Shaina, Hyōga and Shiryū try to fight Poseidon, but they are defeated by his Cosmo. Aiolos' soul sends his Sagittarius Cloth to help the Saints and Seiya dons it. At the same time, Shun faces Siren Sorento, and defeats him in order to destroy the South Atlantic pillar. Ikki manages to return to fight Kanon, and attacks his brain to discover how Saga imprisonated him years ago, as Kanon wanted to kill Athena.
18	Beyond the Blue Waves; Aoki Hatō no Hate (蒼き波涛の果て)	September 8, 1989; 4-08-851533-1	November 7, 2006; 1-4215-0661-0
063. "The Mystery of Poseidon's Resurrection" (海皇復活の謎, Kaiō Fukkatsu no Nazo); 064. "Let Loose! The Golden Arrow" (射て！黄金の一矢, Ute!"Ōgon no Isshi); 065. "The Three Arrows" (三本の矢, Sanbon no ya); 066. "Mainstay Destroyed" (崩壊！メインブレドウィナ, Hōkai! Mein Buredowina); 067. "Beyond the Azure Waves" (蒼き波濤の果て, Aoki Hatō no Hate)
Seiya shoots Sagittarius Arrows at Poseidon, but they are repeatedly reverted. Helped by his friends, Seiya manages to successfully attacks Poseidon, causing him to stay confused. Meanwhile, Ikki discovers that Kanon lied to Poseidon to become Sea Dragon General, and destroys the North Atlantic pillar with help from Sorento. Poseidon suddenly attacks the Saints, but Hyōga and Shiryū are protected by the Aquarius and Libra Cloths. Seiya, Shiryū and Hyōga then attack Poseidon together and manage to defeat him. In order to destroy the Central Pillar where Saori is, Hyōga and Shiryū throw Seiya to the pillar so that he could hit him with all his power. The pillar is destroyed, but Poseidon once again awakes, knocking out all the Saints. Saori appears, and traps Poseidon within her amphora, which remained hidden in the pillar.
19	Hades' Rebirth; Resurrection! Hades' 108 Evil Stars (復活!ハーデス百八の魔星 Fukkatsu!! Hādesu Hyaku-hachi no Masei)	November 10, 1989; 4-08-851534-X	February 6, 2007; 1-4215-0662-9
068. "Resurrection! Hades' 108 Evil Stars" (復活！ハーデス百八の魔星, Fukkatsu!! Hādesu Hyaku-hachi no Masei); 069. "Lamentation! Tears of Blood" (慟哭！血の涙, Dōkoku! Chi no Namida); 070. "The Fireclock is Burning Again!" (火時計！ふたたび燃ゆる, Hidokei! Futatabi Moyuru); 071. "Gemini! The Bloody Confession" (ジェミニ！血の懺悔, Jemini! Chi no Zange)
The seal from the Underworld God and Athena's strongest enemy, Hades, is broken. Hades revives the Gold Saints Aphrodite, Deathmask, Mu's teacher and former Pope, Aries Shion, to kill Saori. Mu is unable to attack his teacher, and Seiya tries to help him. However, Mu transports Seiya out of the Sanctuary since Saori forbid the Bronze Saints to fight. Shion then rescue Deathmask and Aphrodite from Mu attack transporting to Hades' castle, where they are killed by the Specter Wyvern Rhadamanthys. Being also revived by Hades, Saga, Camus and Shura then attempt to kill Mu, but Shion tells them to go to kill Saori. Shiryū's teacher, Libra Dohko, saves Mu and orders him to follow Saga's group while faces Shion. As Mu follows Saga's group, he discovers that several Specters were sent to the Sanctuary, with one of them having already killed Aldebaran. Saga's group enters the Gemini Temple where they are attacked by Kanon. Saga discovers that Kanon is making illusions, and defeats him. Milo and Saori find Kanon in the Pope's room, and Milo tries to kill him thinking he is still evil. However, Milo stops as he sees Kanon as the new Gemini Saint.
20	The Death Land; Fierce Fight of the Zodiac (激闘!十二宮 Gekitō! Jūnikyū)	January 10, 1990; 4-08-851535-8	June 5, 2007; 1-4215-1082-0
072. "The Death World Inside the Cancer Temple" (巨蟹宮の中の死界, Kyokaikyū no Naka no Shikai); 073. "Resurrection of Dohko" (童虎復活！, Dōko Fukkatsu!); 074. "Feary, the Butterfly of the Death World" (死界の蝶！フェアリー, Shikai no Chō! Fearī)
Saga, Shura and Camus enter Cancer Temple and are attacked by illusions created by Shaka. Soon Saga's group disappears, and Shion tries to follow them, but he is attacked by Dohko and Shiryū. Being old now, Dohko is overpowered by Shion, but he soon reveals an ability that allows him to recover his youth. Now, donning the Libra Cloth, Dohko fights Shion, and both of their Cosmo soon disappear. Mu enters the Cancer Temple and discovers that the Specters have also lost Saga's group. Mu is then confronted by the Specter Myu Papillon, who uses psychic abilities like him. After a prolonged fight, Mu defeats Myu, and heads off to the next temple.
21	108 Stars; Under the Sal Trees (沙羅双樹の下に Sarasōju no Shita ni)	March 9, 1990; 4-08-851536-6	October 2, 2007; 1-4215-1083-9
075. "The Golden Lion Shows its Fangs" (牙むく黄金の獅子, Kiba Muku Ōgon no Shishi); 076. "108 Beads" (百八の珠, Hyaku Hachi no Tama); 077. "Under the Sal Trees" (沙羅双樹の下に。。。, Sarasōju no Shita ni...); 078. "To Entrust to Athena" (女神に託す。。。, Atena ni Takusu...)
Aiolia is attacked by several Specters who are able to go the next temple while Worm Raimi faces Aiolia. However, in Virgo Temple, all the Specters are killed by Shaka, who reveals that Saga, Shura and Camus killed three Specters and took his Surplices. Saga's group then proceed to fight Shaka, but are quickly overpowered. Shaka tells them to use Athena Exclamation, a forbidden technique for Saints to see if they are traitors. Saga's group decides to perform the technique and kill Shaka. As the fight ends, they are confronted by Milo, Mu, Aiolia and Shiryū. After a big struggling, The six Gold Saints proceed to perform Athena Exclamation, even though this would mean the Sanctuary could be destroyed.
22	The Eighth Sense; Awaken the Eight Sense! (めざめよ!エイトセンシズ Mezameyo! Eito Senshizu)	May 10, 1990; 4-08-851537-4	February 5, 2008; 1-4215-1084-7
079. "Athena! A Deadly Decision" (女神！死の決意, Atena! Shi no Ketsui); 080. "Athena's Cloth" (アテナの聖衣, Atena no Kurosu); 081. "Let's Go! New Cloths" (ゆけ！新生聖衣, Yuke! Nyū Kurosu); 082. "The Door to the Hades World" (冥界への扉, Meikai e no Tobira); 083. "Wake up! 8th Sense" (めざめよ！！エイトセンシズ, Mezameyo!! Eito Senshizu)
Shiryū joins to the Athena Exclamation attack, defeating Saga's group. Saori tells Mu to bring Saga and the others to her, and commits suicide. Seiya, Shiryū, Hyōga and Shun find Shion, who reveals to them that the revived Gold Saints only wanted to give Saori the Athena Cloth to defeat Hades, but they could never reveal that. Before having his body disappeared, Shion repairs the Damaged Bronze Cloths with Athena's blood into the Final Bronze Cloths and gives them the Athena Cloth to take them to the Underworld, where Saori went once dying. Aiolia, Mu and Milo try to enter the Underworld, but they are defeated by Rhadamanthys, who throws them to a punishment hell from the Underworld. Saga, Shura and Camus try to kill Pandora, Hades' subordinate, but their bodies soon disappear. The Bronze Saints enter Hades' castle, but are defeated by Rhadamanthys' soldiers. Seiya throws himself to one of the Specters, falling to the Underworld, and is then followed by Dohko, Shiryū, Shun and Hyōga.
23	The Acheron Crossing; Hell's Gate of Despair (冥界・絶望の門 Meikai Zetsubō no Mon)	July 10, 1990; 4-08-851538-2	June 3, 2008; 978-1-4215-1085-9
084. "Cross! The Acheron River" (渡れ！アケローン河, Watare! Akerōn-gawa); 085. "The Quiet Courthouse" (静かなる法廷, Shizukanaru Hōtei); 086. "Kanon! Departure for the Front" (カノン！出陣, Kanon! Shutsujin); 087. "A Legendary Saint! Orphée" (伝説の聖闘士！オルフェ, Densetsu no Seinto! Orufe)
The Saint Seiya finds himself in the Underworld with the Saint Shun, and start on their way to Hades' palace. The Saints at the Acheron River meet a Specter named Acheron Charon, who can take them across the river. After boarding their transport, Acheron challenges Seiya, but he is defeated. Seiya and Shun arrive at the Second Prison and find a court where they are attacked by Balron René. Kanon, with his Gemini Cloth, saves Seiya and Shun, and they stay in the Second Prison to fight against Rhadamanthys' soldiers. In the Third Prison Seiya and Shun confront Sphinx Pharaoh, but they are suddenly hit by the Silver Saint Lyra Orphée.
24	The Sixth Ring; The Birth of Hades' Soul (冥王!魂の降誕 Hādesu! Tamashii no Kōtan)	September 10, 1990; 4-08-851539-0	October 7, 2008; 1-4215-1086-3
088. "Orphee, a Sad Requiem" (オルフェ 悲しき鎮魂歌, Orufe Kanashiki Rekuiemu); 089. "Hades! Dependence on Shun" (ハーデス！瞬への憑依, Hādesu! Shun he no Hyōi); 090. "Hurry up! To Giudecca" (急げ！ジュデッカへ, Isoge! Judekka he); 091. "The Deadly Battle of the 5th Prison" (第五獄の死闘！, Dai go Purizun no Shitō!)
Orphée takes Seiya and Shun to a garden where his lover, Eurydice, lies attached to the ground. Eurydice explains to Seiya and Shun that once she died Orphée resquested Hades to revive her, but she remained attached to the Underworld. Orphée discovers that Pandora tricked him to play recitals to Hades, and decides to join Seiya and Shun. The three Saints go directly to Hades' Palace, with Orphée pretending he is going to perform another recital. The Saints attack Hades, but they discover that Hades is not there. The three are then attacked by Rhadamanthys who kills Orphée. Shun suddenly reveals to be the real Hades, and his Specters recognize him as such. Meanwhile, Kanon, Hyōga and Shiryū arrive at the Fifth Prison where Kanon stays to fight Rhadamanthys. Once Kanon defeats Rhadamanthys, the remaining two judges from the Underworld Gryphon Minos and Garuda Aiacos attack Kanon. Ikki, with his Final Bronze Cloth, suddenly appears saving Kanon, and fights Aiacos.
25	Dire Battle; Greatest Eclipse (グレイテスト·エクリップス Gureitesuto Ekurippusu)	November 9, 1990; 4-08-851540-4	February 3, 2009; 1-4215-2409-0
092. "A Clash! Garuda vs. Phoenix" (激突！神鷲対不死鳥, Gekitotsu! Garūda tai Fenikkusu); 093. "Greatest Eclipse" (グレイテスト エクリップス, Gureitesuto Ekurippusu); 094. "Ikki's Wailing Fist" (一輝慟哭の拳, Ikki Dōkoku no Ken); 095. "The Deadly Battle of Cocytus" (氷地獄の死闘, Kokiyūtosu no Shitō)
Ikki defeats Aiacos and is suddenly transported to Hades' Palace. There he discovers Shun was chosen to be the new reincarnation of Hades, and he now plans to create an eclipse to freeze the Earth. Ikki faces Hades, who suddenly attacks himself since Shun is trying to help Ikki defeat himself. Ikki negates to kill his younger brother and is defeated. Specter Harpy Valentine takes Ikki to the frozen river Cocytus where Seiya, Mu, Aiolia and Milo lie, and Seiya suddenly awakes. A weak Seiya then faces Valentine, and the former is able to win. Meanwhile, Saori and Shaka arrive to Hades' Palace to confront Hades.
26	The Pursuit of Hades; The Way to Elysion (エリシオンへの道 Erishion e no Michi)	January 10, 1991; 4-08-851788-1	June 2, 2009; 1-4215-2410-4
096. "Follow Hades!" (冥王を追え！！, Hādesu o Oe!!); 097. "Demolish! The Wailing Wall" (打ち破れ！嘆きの壁, Uchiyabure! Nageki no Kabe); 098. "Union! Gold Cloths" (集結！黄金聖衣, Shūketsu! Gōrudo Kurosu!); 099. "Between Hell and Utopia" (地獄と楽園の間！, Heru to Yūtopia no Aida); 100. "The Way to Elysion" (エリシオンへの道！, Erishion e no Michi!)
Saori throws her blood to Hades, so that Shun's body can repel Hades' soul. However, Hades' soul suddenly attack Saori, and both disappear. Seiya arrives at Hades' Palace, where he finds Shun and Shaka. Shaka explains that Hades took Saori to their world, Elysium, but a giant wall makes it impossible for the Saints to follow. Dohko, Milo, Aiolia and Mu get to the Palace; shortly after, most of the Gold Cloth arrive except Kanon who fights Rhadamanthys; they die. Kanon's Gold Cloth is sent to Hades' Palace so now the Hold Cloths of all the members are together which revives the deceased Gold Saints and have the power to destroy the giant wall. However, all the Gold Saints die, and the Bronze Saints go to Elysium. Before going to Elysium, Hyōga fights Minos and defeats him.
27	Thanatos and Hypnos; Tanatosu to Hyupunosu! (死と眠り！)	March 8, 1991; 4-08-851789-X	October 6, 2009; 1-4215-2411-2
101. "Deadly Battle! 3 vs. 1!!" (死闘！三対一！！, Shitō! San tai Ichi!!); 102. "Pandora's Grey Reminiscences..." (パンドラ 灰色の追憶。。。, Pandora Hai'iro no Tsuioku); 103. "Thanatos and Hypnos" (死と眠り！, Tanatosu to Hyupunosu!); 104. "That Person is Seika!" (その人は星華！, Sono Hito wa Seika!); 105. "Union! Bronze Saints" (結集！青銅聖闘士, Kesshū! Buronzu Seinto); 106. "Reinforcements from the Sea Emperor" (海皇よりの援軍, Kaiō Yori no Engun)
Shiryū defeats three Specters and goes to Elysium. Ikki can not enter Elysium as his Final Cloth does not have Athena's blood. Pandora trades a collar to protect him during his way to Elysium in exchange for Ikki to kill Hades. Pandora explains she was forced by the twin gods Hypnos and Thanatos to create Hades' army but that she was expected to die. Pandora without reason, and Ikki goes to Elysium. Seiya is taken prisoner by Thanatos when he gets to Elysium. Thanatos tries to torture him by killing his anmesiac long-lost older sister Seika; Shun, Shiryū, Hyōga and Ikki intercede but they are easily defeated with their Final Bronze Cloths destroyed. Poseidon takes the Gold Cloths to Elysium to help the Bronze Saints, but the Gold Cloths are destroyed by Thanatos.
28	To a World Brimming Over with light..! Hikari Afureru Sekai e...! (光あふれる世界へ…！)	April 10, 1991; 4-08-851790-3	February 2, 2010; 1-4215-2412-0
107. "The Legendary God Cloths!" (伝説の神聖衣！, Densetsu no Goddo Kurosu!); 108. "Rush! Into Hades' Temple" (突入！ハーデス神殿, Totsunyū! Hādesu Shinden); 109. "Hades! Waking Up from Mythology" (冥王！神話よりの覚醒, Hādesu! Shinwayori no Kakusei); 110. "To a World Brimming Over with light..!" (光あふれる世界へ。。。！, Hikari Afureru Sekai e...!)
Seika regains their memories and wakes Seiya and the latter is able to transform his destroyed Pegasus Bronze Cloth into the powerful Pegasus God Cloth. Now having power from the gods, Seiya easily kills Thanatos and goes with Ikki to save Saori. Hypnos tries to kill Shun, Shiryū and Hyōga, but they use their Andromeda, Dragon and Cygnus God Cloths to kill Hypnos. Seiya and Ikki are able to use their own Pegasus and Phoenix God Cloths and attack Hades' coffin to save Saori who is trapped in a jar. Hades in his real life body responds to the attack and defeats all the God Saints that are there. Seiya throws the Athena Cloth to Saori, causing her to awake donning the Athena Cloth. Saori starts fighting against Hades, but she is soon overpowered. As Hades throws his sword to Saori, Seiya intercepts the attack using his body as shield, sacrificing himself in the process. The four remaining God Saints give their Cosmo to Saori, who then manages to kill Hades. After the death of Hades, the Underworld and Elysium are destroyed, and Saori escapes with the four God Saints, taking Seiya's lifeless body back to the Earth.
