= List of Wangan Midnight episodes =

The collection box released in Japan.

Wangan Midnight is a 2007 Japanese anime television series based on Michiharu Kusunoki's award-winning manga series of the same name. OB Planning (Initial D) announced the production of the animated series during the Tokyo Anime Fair in March 2007. Aired on a pay-per-view channel of Animax in June 2007, the series was co-produced by OB Planning, A.C.G.T., and Pastel under the direction of Tsuneo Tominaga and consists of twenty-six episodes. The series was released on DVD with the thirteenth volume reaching 29th on the Oricon sales chart for Japanese animation DVDs in November 2008.

With 26 episodes, the series is split into four arcs. The first arc is the "Return of the Devil Z" arc, which focuses on Akio Asakura as he gets a rusty blue Nissan Fairlady Z (S30) after losing a race to a mysterious Porsche 911 driven by Tatsuya Shima, and dubbed "Blackbird". Nicknamed the "Devil Z" due to suffering from numerous accidents, Akio starts a rivalry with Blackbird for Wangan superiority, but tries to keep the car from crashing and also must deal with a young woman who is revealed to be the sister of the original owner of the Devil Z, who died in a crash while racing with Blackbird. Meanwhile, other racers are seeking to start a rivalry with the resurrected Devil Z and Blackbird such as Reina Akikawa, a fashion model and television host who drives a Nissan Skyline GT-R R32 and Yoshiaki Ishida, a photographer who drives a white Ferrari Testarossa. It also introduces Jun Kitami, the creator of the Devil Z and Blackbird who is now a bike shop owner. The "Perfect GT-R" arc focuses on Koichi Hiramoto, a young man who gave up on street racing to focus on his family, but comes out of retirement to face the Devil Z and Blackbird. Meanwhile, the Devil Z is destroyed after it crashes into a truck, but gets rebuilt and races again afterward. The "Monster Machine" arc focuses on Kei Aizawa, a host club worker and driver of the Toyota Supra who also seeks to defeat the Devil Z and Blackbird. The "R200 Club" arc focuses on a group of tuners who drive Nissan Skyline GT-R R33 cars that seek to outrun the Devil Z and Blackbird, alongside Reina's R32. Following this, Takayuki Kuroki, owner of FLAT racing and a former R200 Club before their disbandment, is also seeking to outrun the Devil Z and Blackbird as well. "The Hanshin Circular Line" arc focuses on Eiji and Maki Kamiya, two half-brothers from Osaka who both drive Mitsubishi Lancer Evolutions, while the final arc "The Legendary FC" arc focuses on Koichi Kijima, a writer, car enthusiast, and TV show host who drives a Mazda RX7 FC3S and also seeks to oust the Devil Z and Blackbird. The arc missing from the series is the "Akasaka Straight" arc, that focused on Masaki.

== Episode list ==
No.	Title	Original release date
1	"Devil Z"; Transliteration: "Akuma no Zetto" (Japanese: 悪魔のZ)	June 15, 2007
After a shock loss to the Wangan Emperor, Blackbird, Akio Asakura stumbles across a blue S30 at a junkyard and become aware of the car's infamous history.
2	"Blackbird"; Transliteration: "Burakkubādo" (Japanese: ブラックバード)	June 15, 2007
As the Devil Z makes a spectacular return to Wangan, the background of the Z's previous owner is revealed as his younger sister tries to convince Akio to give up the Z.
3	"The GT-R Girl"; Transliteration: "GT - R gāru" (Japanese: GT-Rの少女)	July 7, 2007
A mysterious R32 GT-R appears on the Wangan, and Akio finally discovers that it is driven by a fearless woman.
4	"The third Man"; Transliteration: "San'ninme no otoko" (Japanese: 第3の男)	July 7, 2007
A white Testarossa appears and is driven by an asthmatic photographer. Akio cruises around Hakone due to heavy traffic in Wangan.
5	"Tuner From Hell"; Transliteration: "Jigoku no Chūnā" (Japanese: 地獄のチューナー)	August 8, 2007
Akio meets the tuner of the Devil Z and Blackbird. Afterwards, Akio races against Reina's R32 again with Ishida and Kitami as passengers.
6	"New Machine"; Transliteration: "Nyū Mashin" (Japanese: ニューマシン)	August 18, 2007
Ishida gets his Ferrari modified by Kitami as Akio overhauls the Devil Z's engine. Ishida is then sent to the hospital where doctors discover a cancerous tumor in his stomach.
7	"The Charmed Ones"; Transliteration: "Miserareta Mono-tachi" (Japanese: 魅せられた者たち)	October 19, 2007
Eriko Asakura tries to dump the Devil Z into the harbor but is stopped by Shima in the Blackbird. Kouichi Hiramoto, a mechanic who quit the racing scene to be with his pregnant wife, learns of the Devil Z after his friend takes him to the Wangan again. A wrecked Devil Z is revealed after Akio crashed into a truck, and Kitami suggests it is beyond repair. Kouchi overhears the news from outside the garage.
8	"Ghost of Wangan"; Transliteration: "Wangan no yūrei" (Japanese: 湾岸のゴースト)	October 19, 2007
Kouichi Hiramoto buys a silver R32 GT-R leaving his wife Megumi crying back to her hometown of Miyazaki. Hiramoto also vows to make his R32 GT-R "The Authentic Dragon".
9	"Reviving the Demon"; Transliteration: "Yomigaeru Akuma" (Japanese: 甦る悪魔)	November 16, 2007
Harada's Z31 runs into Hiramoto's R32 GT-R and Shima's Blackbird while Akio's wrecked Devil Z is being repaired. Eriko shares a moment with Shima while studying in London.
10	"Spirit of Dogfight"; Transliteration: "Supiritto obu doggufaito" (Japanese: ドッグファイト)	November 16, 2007
The Devil Z has completed its repairs and races against Shima's Blackbird and the two R32 GT-Rs driven by Reina and Hiramoto respectively. Hiramoto gives up racing and finally reunites with his wife and family in Miyazaki as their child is born safely.
11	"Illusive Top Speed Runner"; Transliteration: "Maboroshi no Saikōsoku Rannā" (Japanese: 幻の最高速ランナー)	December 12, 2007
Reina discovers a Supra while driving around in C1. Kei drives the Supra and encounters Akio in Shima's Blackbird.
12	"Professional"; Transliteration: "Purofesshonaru" (Japanese: プロフェッショナル)	December 12, 2007
Reina is tasked to drive a demo R33 GT-R from RGO while Yamamoto drives Reina's R32 GT-R while racing against the Supra. Akio drives Devil Z and races against the same R33 GT-R that Reina drove.
13	"Monster Machine"; Transliteration: "Monsutā Mashin" (Japanese: モンスターマシン)	February 14, 2008
After the race against Reina's borrowed R33 and Akio's Devil Z, Kei's Supra is being tuned by Takagi and RGO.
14	"Stall"; Transliteration: "Shissoku" (Japanese: 失速)	February 14, 2008
Kitami tells Kei that his Supra has "died", but Kei resists and continues racing until his car's rear tires start heating up. Following this, a group of tuners discuss about their plans in a diner and one of them, Kuroki, races Reina's R32.
15	"R-200 Club" (Japanese: R-200CLUB)	March 20, 2008
A ragtag alliance of tuners who can break the 200 mph speed limit discuss about outrunning the Devil Z, Blackbird, and Reina's GT-R. Meanwhile, one of its members, Kuroki, encounters the Devil Z and races against it.
16	"OutRun"; Transliteration: "Autoran" (Japanese: アウトラン)	March 20, 2008
The R200 Club (Motoki, Tezuka, and Sonoda) raced against Akio's Devil Z (with Kuroki as a passenger), Shima's Blackbird, and Reina's GT-R, but failed. Kuroki defects from the R-200 Club and vows to defeat Motoki once again.
17	"Reunion"; Transliteration: "Saikai" (Japanese: 再会)	April 18, 2008
Kuroki's GT-R races against Shima's Blackbird but was defeated due to the engine mount being at overweight, he then reunites with Mika to share their past memories driving in C1.
18	"Now, This Place..."; Transliteration: "Ima, Kono Basho ni..." (Japanese: 今, この場所に...)	April 18, 2008
The Devil Z and Kuroki's R33 GT-R meet up and start battling, with Reina on her R32 watching it with Mika on the sidelines.
19	"Stand By Me"; Transliteration: "Sutando Bai Mī" (Japanese: スタンド·バイ·ミー)	June 20, 2008
Kuroki tries to beat Akio's Devil Z but his engine blows due to too much engine size causing Akio to buffer his R33 to a stop ending the race in a draw. Kuroki repairs his R33 engine into a new one. Shima and Kitami travel to Osaka and meet the two Lancer Evolution half-brothers.
20	"Osaka Midnight"; Transliteration: "Ōsaka Middonaito" (Japanese: 大阪ミッドナイト)	June 20, 2008
Eiji goes to Tokyo with a promise of returning home to Osaka after 3 months. Shortly, Eiji and Maki race a tuned R34 GT-R similar to that of Gen Goto's in the Hanshin Expressway.
21	"In the Passion of the Night"; Transliteration: "Yoru no Nekki no Naka de" (Japanese: 夜の熱気の中で)	July 18, 2008
Eiji finally arrives in Tokyo and meets up with the RGO staff. Shima's Blackbird now has Shige's muffler.
22	"Shutoku Midnight"; Transliteration: "Shuto Kōsoku Gozen Rei Ji" (Japanese: 首都高速午前零時)	July 18, 2008
Rikako tunes the engine of Eiji's Evo V and the RGO cars. Maki visits Tokyo and compliments about it being "worse than Osaka" before returning home to Osaka.
23	"Dead End"; Transliteration: "Deddo Endo" (Japanese: デッド·エンド)	August 15, 2008
Eiji, with Rikako as a passenger, challenges the Devil Z and the Blackbird while in Tokyo before finally returning home to Osaka but loses.
24	"Passion of the Distant Day"; Transliteration: "Tōi Hi no Passhon" (Japanese: 遠い日のパッション)	August 15, 2008
After a long time away from the world of racing, Koichi Kijima longs for his FC. He finally meets up with his FC's tuner, Machida, and asks Akio to accompany his search for the FC.
25	"Unstoppable feeling" Transliteration: "Tomaranai kimochi" (Japanese: 止まらない気持ち)	September 13, 2008
Rikako tunes the engine of Akio's Devil Z. Meanwhile, Shima's Blackbird crashes while dodging a taxi, forcing Takagi to rebuild it with a carbon fiber body in order to reduce weight.
26	"The Chosen One"; Transliteration: "Erabareshi Mono" (Japanese: 選ばれし者)	September 14, 2008
Kijima's FC, Shima's Blackbird, and the Devil Z split up in formation for the final battle of who would be the fastest. Eventually, Kijima gives up as he couldn't breathe in his car any longer; while Shima's Blackbird becomes too underweight, forcing him to retire the race. The episode ends with Akio emerging victorious, passing a bridge as the credits roll.
