= List of Lupin the Third manga =

Lupin the Third media franchise was spawned by a Japanese manga written and illustrated by Monkey Punch. It includes several animated television series, television specials, theatrical and home video features as well as further manga titles.

The story follows the adventures of a gang of thieves led by Lupin III, the grandson of Arsène Lupin, the gentleman thief of Maurice Leblanc's series of novels. Lupin and his gang travel throughout the world to steal treasures and escape from the law.

The first manga was written and illustrated by Monkey Punch. It was serialized by Futabasha in Weekly Manga Action in 94 chapters from August 10, 1967. Additional chapters known as Lupin III New Adventures were released from August 12, 1971. Tokyopop licensed the series for North America, and released all 14 volumes between December 10, 2002, and July 6, 2004. The Tokyopop edition is adapted from the Chuokoron Shinsha edition from 1989. In Europe, the series was licensed by Star Comics in Italy and Ediciones Mangaline in Spain.

Monkey Punch began publishing the second Lupin manga, Shin Lupin III (新ルパン三世) in Weekly Manga Action on June 23, 1977, until 1981. Three chapters were published in the British magazine Manga Mania between May and July 1996. Tokyopop licensed the second series, and released the first nine volumes as Lupin III: World's Most Wanted between September 7, 2004, and July 10, 2007. Like the first series, the Tokyopop release was based on the Chuokoron Shinsha edition from 1990. Tokyopop later cancelled the series due to low sales.

A number of other series by other creators have since followed.

On August 27, 2004, Futabasha launched Lupin III Official Magazine, a quarterly publication of Lupin III manga by various authors.

== Lupin III: World's Most Wanted ==
American version of Shin Lupin III. Seventeen volumes were planned, but only nine were released.

No.	Release date	ISBN
1	September 7, 2004	1-59532-070-9
001. "Lupin Family Reunion" (ルパン一家勢揃い); 002. "Lonesome Lupin" (Lonesomeルパン); 003. "Melon Cop" (刑事メロン); 004. "Honor Thy Sister"; 005. "The Prisoner Transport"; 006. "Tale of the Tape"; 007. "Death by Surgery"; 008. "186 Lupins"; 009. "Bikini Pirates"
2	November 9, 2004	1-59532-071-7
010. "Full Release"; 011. "Kill Better: Work Union"; 012. "Who Are You?" (Who are You? -アンタダアレ?ー); 013. "A Girl for Waka"; 014. "Southern Criminality"; 015. "Melon the Magician"; 016. "Eye for an Eye, Tooth for a Tooth!!"; 017. "Research Animals"; 018. "Steel Lizard: Part One" (鉄トカゲ（前篇）)
3	January 11, 2005	1-59532-072-5
019. "Steel Lizard: Part Two" (鉄トカゲ（後篇）); 020. "Kite Gallery"; 021. "Flipping the Bird"; 022. "Circuit Breaker"; 023. "Spaghetti Jigen"; 024. "A Girl Named He"; 025. "Honey Pot O' Gold"; 026. "Pop-Up Lupin"; 027. "Goemon Go!"
4	March 8, 2005	1-59532-073-3
028. "Love Child"; 029. "A House Divided"; 030. "Revenge of the Rat"; 031. "Strange Bedfellows"; 032. "Don't Rocket 'til You've Tried It"; 033. "Lupin Gets Busted"; 034. "Red Tide"; 035. "Love is an Illusion"; 036. "Memoirs of a Zenigata"
5	May 10, 2005	1-59532-074-1
037. "Shallow End of the Secretarial Pool"; 038. "Grab Life by the Crystal Balls"; 039. "Hotel Insecurity"; 040. "The Rest is Silence"; 041. "Noises Way Off"; 042. "Let the Buyer Beware"; 043. "Lupin vs. the Volcano"; 044. "Blowing Your Load"; 045. "Quiz Ho!"; 046. "Indecent Exposure"
6	February 7, 2006	1-59532-075-X
047. "Fujiko Forever!"; 048. "Shooting Goemon"; 049. "Goemon Star"; 050. "Documentary Maniac"; 051. "Lupin Uncut"; 052. "Prison Library"; 053. "The Illustrated Woman"; 053. "Die Tryin'"; 054. "Cane in My Ass"; 055. "Pants on Fire"; 057. "Prize Fight"
7	July 11, 2006	1-59532-076-8
058. "Five of a Kind"; 059. "Postcards from Nowhere"; 060. "Melon Cop Madness"; 061. "A Bundle of Oy!"; 062. "Chasing Tail"; 063. "Shacking Off!"; 064. "Three Beers for the Bus Driver"; 065. "Zenigata on the Inside"; 066. "Defence Against Disguises"
8	January 9, 2007	1-59532-077-6
067. "Guts to Open"; 068. "Kicking and Steaming"; 069. "Overnight Getaway"; 070. "Ceiling Lucky Punk?"; 071. "Fujiko Explains It All"; 072. "Lupin Lullaby"; 073. "Ice Guys Finish Last"; 074. "String Music"; 075. "Gemstone Goddess"; 076. "Given to Distraction"; 077. "Judge, Jury and Lupin"
9	July 10, 2007	1-59532-078-4
078. "Reheasal of Fortune"; 079. "Now Museum, Now You Don't"; 080. "Brain Swap"; 081. "Body Work"; 082. "Custody Battle"; 083. "Match Dot Con"; 084. "Flag Burnin'"; 085. "The Mad Science of Sleep"; 086. "R-U-Me-2?"; 087. "Hell's Chaprerone"; 088. "Car Swap"
10	January 8, 2008 (canceled)	1-59532-079-2

== Lupin III S ==
No.	Release date	ISBN
1	June 1998	—

== Lupin III Y ==
No.	Release date	ISBN
1	May 27, 1999	—
2	October 10, 1999	—
3	December 27, 1999	—
4	February 20, 2000	—
5	March 28, 2000	—
6	June 28, 2000	—
7	September 28, 2000	—
8	November 28, 2000	—
9	February 20, 2001	—
10	May 28, 2001	—
11	September 28, 2001	—
12	January 18, 2002	—
13	April 30, 2002	—
14	September 12, 2002	—
15	November 28, 2002	—
16	April 12, 2003	—
17	July 11, 2003	—
18	November 28, 2003	—
19	July 6, 2004	—
20	August 28, 2004	—

== Lupin III M ==
Lupin III M by Yukio Miyama began serialization in 2004.

No.	Release date	ISBN
1	January 27, 2005	4-575-93933-1
2	July 19, 2005	4-575-93957-9
3	January 28, 2006	4-575-93995-1
4	August 28, 2006	4-575-94027-5
5	April 28, 2007	978-4-575-94084-8
6	September 12, 2007	978-4-575-94126-5
7	May 12, 2008	978-4-575-94168-5
8	September 12, 2008	978-4-575-941906

=== Lupin M Neo ===
No.	Release date	ISBN
1	August 28, 2009	978-4-575-83663-9
2	November 28, 2009	978-4-575-83698-1
3	January 12, 2011	978-4-575-83856-5
4	January 12, 2011	978-4-575-83857-2
5	January 12, 2001	978-4-575-84014-8
6	November 28, 2012	978-4-575-84164-0
7	August 28, 2014	978-4-575-84476-4

== Lupin III H ==
Lupin III H by Naoya Hayakawa started in summer 2009. The first volume was released on October 12, 2010, and a ninth was released on February 12, 2016.

No.	Title	Release date	ISBN
1	-	October 12, 2010	978-4-575-83821-3
2	-	February 12, 2011	978-4-575-83867-1
3	Is Lupin Burning...?! Compilation	March 12, 2012	978-4-575-84042-1
4	Master Thief VS Lady Looter Compilation	May 28, 2013	978-4-575-84236-4
5	Blood Seal – Eternal Mermaid Compilation	November 28, 2013	978-4-575-84312-5
6	Farewell My Beloved Witch Compilation	June 27, 2014	978-4-575-84442-9
7	Man Stealing Stars Compilation	December 27, 2014	978-4-575-84558-7
8	World is Mine Compilation	March 27, 2015	978-4-575-84603-4
9	The Brilliant Challenge Compilation	February 12, 2016	978-4-575-84758-1

== Lupin III B ==
Lupin III B by Tamio Baba was serialized between 2012 and 2013. A collected volume was released on February 28, 2014.

No.	Release date	ISBN
1	February 28, 2014	978-4575843538

== Spin offs ==
A number of spin offs focusing on individual characters were also created. Captain Zenigata was first released on September 12, 2011. M.F.C (Mine Fujiko Company) was published as two volumes on September 28, 2009. Goemon Ishikawa XIII by Kazuo Hoshi was released on September 27, 2014.
