= List of Sgt. Frog chapters =

The cover of the first volume of Sgt. Frog as published by Kadokawa Shoten on November 29, 1999, in Japan.

The chapters of the Japanese manga series Sgt. Frog are written and illustrated by Mine Yoshizaki and are serialized in the manga magazine Shōnen Ace. The individual chapters are then collected into tankōbon volumes by Kadokawa Shoten, who released the first volume on November 29, 1999, and volume 35 on December 26, 2025. The series follows the Keroro Platoon, a platoon of frog-like alien invaders, as they attempt to take over the Earth from a secret military base beneath the Hinata house.

The series has been licensed for an English-language release in North America by Tokyopop, who released volume 1 on March 9, 2004, and volume 21 on May 10, 2011. Following the shutdown of Tokyopop, in December 2014 Viz Media announced they had the current rights to the Sgt. Frog manga and would be releasing the series digitally only. These are reprints of the original Tokyopop graphic novels.

== Volume list ==
No.	Original release date	Original ISBN	English release date	English ISBN
01	November 29, 1999	4-04-713307-8	March 9, 2004	978-1-59182-703-0
001. "Enter the Sergeant!"; 002. "An Audience with General Mom"; 003. "Me, Myself and Momoko"; 004. "The Sarge's Quarters – Invasion From Within!"/"A Visit to the Sergeant's Quarters"; 005. "Cohabitation of the Third Kind"; 006. "Alien Observation Journal"; 006.5. "(6.5 Haunted Houseguest)"; 007. "Carnage in the Storm"; 008. "Momoko's South Seas Operation"; 009. "Extended Shore Leave"; 010. "Behold the Lord of Terror! Apocalypse Now!"; Bonus: "Everything You Ever Wanted to Know about Sgt. Keroro..."; Bonus: "Sergeant Sightings... In the States!"
02	June 28, 2000	4-04-713344-2	May 4, 2004	978-1-59182-704-7
012. "Battle Royale: Keroro vs. Giroro"; 013. "Sergeant Reaches the Critical Point"; Bonus: "An Illuminating Interview With Private Tamama"; 014. "Top Secret Operations Rally!!"; 015. "Momoka's Love: A Narrow Escape!"; 016. "The Hinatas Ring In a Clean New Year!"; 017. "Operation: Relative Interception!"; Bonus: "Everything You Never Wanted to Know About Corporal Giroro!"; 018. "Operation: Chocolate Shock!"; 019. "The 623 Incident!!"; 020. "A Fourth Visitor"; 020.5. "Danger! Earth Soldier!!"
03	February 26, 2001	4-04-713396-5	July 6, 2004	978-1-59182-705-4
021. "Welcome to Radio-free Keroro"; 022. "Natsumi's Number is Up"; 023. "General Mom's Charge to Relive Her Youth"; 024. "Operation: Swimsuit Issue"; 025. "A Horror Showdown!"; 026. "Lady Moa Grows Up Fast"; 027. "Enter the Other Momoka!"; 028. "Momoka Platoon Strikes Back"; 029. "A Very Keroro Christmas"; Bonus: "All About Sergeant Major Kululu"; Bonus: "Sumomo Prologue"; Bonus Encounter: "Sumomo: A Mission of Love"
04	September 21, 2001	4-04-713455-4	September 7, 2004	978-1-59182-706-1
030. "True Confessions! A Shocking New Year"; 030.5 "Letters From the Homeworld"; 031. "The Revenge of the Red Goblin!!"; 032. "To the Death! The First Snowball Fight"; 033. "The Sergeant Gets What He Deserves"; 034. "Number Three Molar: The Devil's Residence!!"; 035. "I Am You and You Are Me"; 036. "Incoming! Keroro Platoon's Number One Fan"; 037. "A Hinata Family Reunion"; 037.5 "Riding Paul"
05	May 29, 2002	4-04-713496-1	November 9, 2004	978-1-59182-707-8
038. "Beat the Heat! Attack From Below!!"; 039. "Operation: Crash the Sports Festival!!"; 040. "Operation: Dazzle the Heavenly Hosts!!"; 041. "Operation: Birthday Blitz!!"; 042. "Operation: New Year's Parcheesi!!"; 043. "Momoka Goes AWOL? The Father Descends!!"; 044. "Lord of Terror, Go! Go! Go!"; 045. "Back To the Subject--Forward March!!"; 045.5 "The Monsters of the Hinata Family"
06	January 29, 2003	4-04-713532-1	January 11, 2005	978-1-59182-708-5
046. "Target: The Hinata Home!!"; 047. "A Motion For Demotion?!"; 048. "Water Battle: Natsumi vs. Frog!!"; 049. "Danger in the Deep Sea!!!"; 050. "Matsuri Battle: Alien vs. Iron Man!!"; 051. "A Jerk and a Genius! The Legend of a Sergeant-Major"; 052. "Feelings All the Way! The Legend of a Corporal"; 053. "The World's Smallest Invasion: Part I"; "Special Stand-Alone Issue: Sergeant Keroro"; "Encyclopedia Keronia"
07	September 24, 2003	4-04-713574-7	March 8, 2005	978-1-59532-448-1
054. "The World's Smallest Invasion: Continued"; 055. "Enter the Dragonlike Transfer Student!"; 056. "The Fifth One Appears! The Legend of Dororo"; 057. "Emergency Warning! Koyuki Azumaya Approaching!!"; "Big Bonus 1"; 058. "Invasion in Bloom!! Operation: Cosmic Flower Expo!"; 059. "Special Effects: Job Hunting Made Simple!!"; 060. "A Spreading Contagion?! Runaway May Disease!"; 061. "Swallow This! An Annual Invasion"; 054.5 "The World's Smallest Invasion: The Lost Episode"
08	March 24, 2004	4-04-713613-1	May 10, 2005	978-1-59532-449-8
062. "Natsumi In Crisis! A New Biological Weapon!"; 063. "Power Outage! Operation: Beat the Heat!"; 064. "Body Alteration! Operation: Door-to-Door Sales"; 065. "Impulse Buy! My Poorly Maintained Wings!"; "Special Bonus Ad!"; 066. "Operation: Hijack--Manga-Writer Style!"; 067. "The Charge of the Animal Brigade!"; 068. "Media Attack! Operation: Welcoming Party!"; 069. "For Today's Youth: A Dose of Cold, Harsh Reality"
09	August 6, 2004	4-04-713651-4	July 12, 2005	978-1-59532-796-3
070. "Operation: Avaricious Mixed Bathing!!"; 071. "Fish Battle!! Invasion Will Be Child's Play!!!"; 072. "The Eve of the 623 Incident!"; 073. "Earth! Hairball!! Entanglement!!!"; 074. "Rain, Then Encounter, Then Separation, Then Sun"; 074.5 "And Further Beyond..."; 075. "An Invasion of Convenience?"; 076. "Forbidden Planet? Super-Secret Operation!!"
10	February 24, 2005	4-04-713705-7	December 13, 2005	978-1-59182-344-5
077. "Bloodcurdling Fright: A Battle of Spirits and Space!--Part One"; 078. "Bloodcurdling Fright: A Battle of Spirits and Space!--Part Two"; 079. "A Lesson in Alien Savoir Faire!"; 080. "Fuyuki Hinata's Alien Lifestyle Report"; 081. "The Last Battle: Keroro Platoon's 24 Hours--Part One"; 082. "The Last Battle: Keroro Platoon's 24 Hours--Part Two"; 083. "The Last Battle: Keroro Platoon's 24 Hours--Part Three"; "Power Natsumi: The Authoritative Guide!"
11	October 5, 2005	4-04-713762-6	June 11, 2006	978-1-59816-596-8
084. "The Last Battle: Keroro Platoon's 24 Hours--Part Four"; 085. "The Tale of Koyuki Azumaya & Dororo"; 086. "Battle of the Models Breaks Out At the Hinata Family Home"; 087. "Master Natsumi Rainy Rescue Operation"; 088. "A New Beginning? A Determined Sergeant Leaves Home"; 089. "Pathos: Pokopen Fair Pavilion Construction Plan"; 090. "A Real Hit?! Runaway Youth of the Keron Forces!!"; 091. "Operation: Pamper General Mom!"
12	February 25, 2006	4-04-713791-X	December 12, 2006	978-1-59816-865-5
092. "Strictly Forbidden: A Hard-Boiled Ban!"; 093. "Splendor In the Tub!"; 094. "Keroro Falls Ill; Chaos Ensues!"; 095. "All Hail the Watermelon Generation!"; 096. "Crash! Typhoon Declares Victory!"; 097. "The First (and Last) All-Space Jump Rope Championship!"; 098. "Trick or Threat? A Halloween Invasion!"; 099. "Messengers From the Dark: Fuyuki's Rescue!"; 100. "The Frog Who Lost New Year's!"; 100.5. "The Door of Truth...!"
13	July 26, 2006	4-04-713837-1	June 12, 2007	978-1-4278-0211-8
101. "The Secret Trap of the Kero Ball"; 102. "A Lone Boy and a Southern Cross"; 103. "Return of the Nightmare! Battle on the Snow!"; 104. "Keroro Battles the Girls' Day Dolls"; 105. "Cherry Blossoms on the Front Lines"; 106. "Spring Storm! Space War Outbreak!"; 107. "The Way of the Hoodlum! A Terror Unmatched!"; 108. "Legends of the Bread Maker"; 109. "Space Ninja Battle!"; Summer Blockbuster Sergeant: Kiruru Disposal! An Epic Film; Summer Blockbuster Sergeant: Invade the Earth! An Epic Film Treatment
14	February 26, 2007	978-4-04-713903-9	January 9, 2008	978-1-4278-0460-0
110. "We Hate, Hate, Hate Him!"; 111. "Underwater, No One Can Hear You Scream"; 112. "A Midsummer Mix-Up"; Bonus Encounter: Fuyuki's Occult Investigation Report; 113. "Challenge: Cosmic Exercise"; 114. "The Out-of-This-World Psychic Experiment"; 115. "A Battle to the Death!! The Great Carb Combat"; 116. "The Siren Song of a Perfect Partnership"; 117. "The True Prophecy of the Apocalypse"
15	July 26, 2007	978-4-04-713939-8	May 10, 2008	978-1-4278-1039-7
118. "The Year's Final Mission: Safety Check-Up!"; 119. "Laughter: The Best Strategy"; 120. "New Captain = New Mission?"; 121. "The Tale of Koyuki Azumaya's Self-Discovery"; 122. "Mission: Breathe Deep and Dance!"; 123. "Arrival of...That Girl!"; Scoop!!! An Alien Female Does Exist!; 124. "Fuyuki's Stone Figure"; 125. "A Bitter Battle on a Lonely Island In a Distant Sea"; Easter Island Exploration Record
16	February 26, 2008	978-4-04-715021-8	December 1, 2008	978-1-4278-1462-3
126. "A New Day Dawns! Keroro = One Big Softie!"; 127. "We All Fall Down! ★ A Bow-Ring Match!"; 128. "Come, Come, Come Chew Gum!"; 129. "Every Day is Invasion Day! The Icy World Encroaches!!!"; 130. "Target: Rest Area"; 131. "The Ultimate Spirit Photo Contest?!"; 132. "Dread Realization! Defense Network Reinforcement and Breach Prevention!"; 133. "The Shocking Survivalist Sergeant!"; 134. "All Line Up! The Dark Before the Dawn"; 135. "Slam! Earth vs Space Video Game Armageddon!!!"
17	July 26, 2008	978-4-04-715092-8	May 1, 2009	978-1-4278-1591-0
136. "Smitten with Mittens!"; 137. "Battlefield Miracle on 34th Street"; 138. "The Snowman Cometh"; 139. "Birth Announcement: A Squeaky New Species!"; 140. "Is Capture Impossible?! The Assassin Attacks!"; 141. "Home Is Where Your Fortress Is!"; 142. "Spin It! Warping the First Record"; 143. "All Mixed Up! Attack and Defense! A New Operation in the Making!"; 144. "Sweet Dreams of Victory!"; 145. "Total Resolution Wins the Day?!"
18	February 26, 2009	978-4-04-715180-2	December 29, 2009	978-1-4278-1709-9
146. "Approved for Publication! Momoka Nishizawa is On Fire!"; 147. "What's the Buzz, Little Bug? Take Wing!"; 148. "Summer Gone Wild?! Attack on the High Seas!"; 149. "Kero-Tel Paint"; 150. "Revisiting Mankind? Lunar Tourism Plan!"; 151. "No Escape! Expect the... Expected?!"; 152. "Move Out, Troops! The Invasion Tour Begins!"; 153. "Keroro Platoon Anhilated?! The Great Battle of Kyoto!"; 0. "Methinks 'Tis Time to Sally Forth!"
19	July 25, 2009	978-4-04-715295-3	June 29, 2010	978-1-4278-1783-9
154. "A Sealed Space-Time Chamber! Two Cultures Sing Their Battle Songs!"; 155. "A Mad Cow?! Overrun by a Bull-Headed Plan!"; 156. "Keron Bubbles Over!"; 157. "A Galaxy-Class House Sitter"; 158. "In-Alien-Able Punishment!"; 159. "Plan RC: Remote Controlled Earthlings"; 160. "Keron-Man: The Origin Story"; 161. "Tomorrow's Forecast: Invasion! Kero Kero Weather Dolls"; 162. "Getting the Right Shot: The Training of a Front-Line Reporter"; 163. "Farewell, Keroro Robot!"
20	February 4, 2010	978-4-04-715386-8	November 30, 2010	978-1-4278-0619-2
164. "Full-Length Feature: Lost in the Abyss"
21	September 10, 2010	978-4-04-715529-9	May 10, 2011	978-1-4278-3335-8
165. "A Surefire Weapon At Last!"; 166. "Tiger on the Prowl"; 167. "A Smashing Pumpkin!"; 168. "The Ultimate Keroro Bento!"; 169. "The Unstoppable Free-Spirited Invader"; 170. "Stop-and-Go Combat"; 171. "Invasion Navigation Made Easy"; 172. "World-Wide Keroro"; 173. "F.I.E.L.D. Trip"; 174. "The Dragon's Bed"; 175. "K Ramen on Ramen Ave, Musashino, Tokyo"
22	July 22, 2011	978-4-04-715747-7	—	—
176. "The Sticky Sticker Blitzkrieg!"; 177. "Operation Keron Harvest Moon!"; 178. "Invasion From Castle Kerocula!"; 179. "New Year's Forever"; 180. "It's Potato-Diggin' Time!"; 181. "Operation Pekoponian Hunting Season!"; 182. "Inter-Dimensional Spicy Sauce On Rice"; 183. "Start From The Very Beginning!"; 184. "The Keron Military Starts A New Phase (Part 1)"; 185. "The Keron Military Starts A New Phase (Part 2)"
23	March 22, 2012	978-4-04-120170-1	—	—
186. "A Terrifying New... Volume"; 187. "Operation Little Red Devil"; 188. "The New D"; 189. "Have You Ever Been Abducted By Aliens?"; 190. "The Dolphin-Riding Alien"; 191.; 192. "The Two Keron Stars ☆"; 193. "An Ancient Power"; 194. "With Everyone's Power"
24	January 24, 2013	978-4-04-120555-6	—	—
195.; 196.; 197.; 198.; 199.; 200.; 201.; 202.; 203.; 204.; 205.; 206.; 207.; 208.; 209.
25	March 26, 2014	978-4-04-120979-0	—	—
210.; 211.; 212.; 213.; 214.; 215.; 216.; 217.; 218.; 219.; 220.
26	March 26, 2015	978-4-04-102865-0	—	—
221.; 222.; 223.; 224.; 225.; 226.; 227.; 228.; 229.; 230.; 231.; 232.; 233.
27	May 26, 2016	978-4-04-104273-1	—	—
234.; 235.; 236.; 237.; 238.; 239.; 240.; 241.; 242.; 243.; 244.; 245.; 246.
28	April 25, 2017	978-4-04-105544-1	—	—
247.; 248.; 249.; 250.
29	May 26, 2018	978-4-04-105545-8	—	—
250. "God of Easter Island"; 251.
30	May 25, 2019	978-4-04-107146-5	—	—
252.; 253.; 254.; 255.; 256.; 257.; 258.; 259.; 260.; 261.; 262.
31	December 25, 2020	978-4-04-108582-0	—	—
263.; 264.; 265.; 266.; 267.; 268.; 269.; 270.; 271.; 272.; 273.; 274.; 275.; 276.
32	April 26, 2022	978-4-04-112476-5	—	—
277. "Kururu and Mutsumi"; 278.; 279.; 280.; 281.; 282.; 283.; 284.; 285.; 286.; 287.; 288.; 289.; 290.; 291.
33	May 26, 2023	978-4-04-113704-8	—	—
292.; 293.; 294.; 295.; 296.; 297.; 298.; 299.; 300.; 301.; 302.; 303.; 304.; 305.; 306.
34	August 26, 2024	978-4-04-115290-4	—	—
307.; 308.; 309.; 310.; 311.; 312.; 313.; 314.; 315.; 316.; 317.; 318.; 319.; 320.; 321.
35	December 26, 2025	978-4-04-116794-6	—	—
322.; 323.; 324.; 325.; 326.; 327.; 328.; 329.; 330.; 331.; 332.; 333.; 334.; 335.; 336.
