= List of Case Closed volumes =

Case Closed, known as Meitantei Conan (名探偵コナン; Great Detective Conan) (officially translated as Detective Conan) in Japan, is written and illustrated by Gosho Aoyama and serialized in Shogakukan's Weekly Shōnen Sunday. The series began its serialization on January 19, 1994. Since Case Closed's premiere, over 1000 chapters have been released in Japan, making it the 21st longest running manga series. Several adaptations based on Case Closed have been made, including an anime series and animated films. A database consisting of all the cases from the manga was launched in 2007. Viz Media announced its licensing of the series on June 1, 2004, and following Funimation Entertainment's English localization, released the series under the name Case Closed with renamed characters. The series follows high school detective Jimmy Kudo who was transformed into a child after being forced to ingest an experimental poison.

Shogakukan collected the individual chapters into tankōbon volumes in Japan. The first volume was released on June 18, 1994, with new volumes currently on-going. In addition, Gosho Aoyama's assistants have also written and published volumes their own side stories of Case Closed. Ani-manga tankōbon based on the Case Closed films have also been released by Shogakukan with each movie cut into two parts.

Viz Media licensed the manga and released the first English adapted volume on September 7, 2004. Victor Gollancz Ltd used Viz Media's translation to release the 15 volumes in the United Kingdom before ceasing publication of manga (Viz Media has since re-released them). On July 22, 2009, Viz Media uploaded a website containing its licensed series from Weekly Shōnen Sunday; the first chapter of Case Closed was uploaded to the website on October 21, 2009.

== Volumes ==
=== Volumes 1–20 ===
No.	Title	Original release date	English release date
1	The Sherlock Holmes of Modern Times	June 18, 1994; 978-4-09-123371-4	September 7, 2004; 978-1-59116-327-5
2	The Woman of Mystery	July 18, 1994; 978-4-09-123372-1	November 3, 2004; 978-1-59116-587-3
3	One and the Same?	October 18, 1994; 978-4-09-123373-8	January 4, 2005; 978-1-59116-589-7
4	Explosives On A Train	February 18, 1995; 978-4-09-123374-5	March 1, 2005; 978-1-59116-632-0
5	The Bandaged Be-header	April 18, 1995; 978-4-09-123375-2	May 5, 2005; 978-1-59116-633-7
6	The Last Loan	July 18, 1995; 978-4-09-123376-9	July 5, 2005; 978-1-59116-838-6
7	The Curse of the Moonlight Sonata	November 18, 1995; 978-4-09-123377-6	September 8, 2005; 978-1-59116-978-9
8	Who Is the Night Baron?	December 9, 1995; 978-4-09-123378-3	November 15, 2005; 978-1-4215-0111-6
9	Kidnappings, Shootings, & Drownings... Oh My!	January 18, 1996; 978-4-09-123379-0	January 17, 2006; 978-1-4215-0166-6
10	East Meets West	April 18, 1996; 978-4-09-123380-6	March 21, 2006; 978-1-4215-0316-5
11	An Unfamiliar Face	July 18, 1996; 978-4-09-125041-4	May 16, 2006; 978-1-4215-0441-4
12	Who Shanked Teddy?	September 18, 1996; 978-4-09-125042-1	July 18, 2006; 978-1-4215-0442-1
13	Life's A Beach... Then You Get Murdered!	December 10, 1996; 978-4-09-125043-8	September 19, 2006; 978-1-4215-0443-8
14	The Magical Suicide	March 18, 1997; 978-4-09-123371-4	November 21, 2006; 978-1-4215-0444-5
15	The Frozen Teacher	June 18, 1997; 978-4-09-125045-2	January 16, 2007; 978-1-4215-0445-2
16	The Black Star	August 9, 1997; 978-4-09-125046-9	March 20, 2007; 978-1-4215-0881-8
17	Time for Trouble	November 18, 1997; 978-4-09-125047-6	May 15, 2007; 978-1-4215-0882-5
18	What Little Girls Are Made Of	January 17, 1998; 978-4-09-125048-3	July 17, 2007; 978-1-4215-0883-2
19	And Then There Were Two	April 18, 1998; 978-4-09-125049-0	September 18, 2007; 978-1-4215-0884-9
20	Conan's Sense of Snow	July 18, 1998; 978-4-09-125050-6	November 20, 2007; 978-1-4215-0885-6

=== Volumes 21–40 ===
No.	Title	Original release date	English release date
21	Strangers on a Plane	October 17, 1998; 978-4-09-125491-7	January 15, 2008; 978-1-4215-1456-7
22	Murder on the Hokutosei Express	February 18, 1999; 978-4-09-125492-4	March 18, 2008; 978-1-4215-1674-5
23	Film Threat	April 17, 1999; 978-4-09-125493-1	May 20, 2008; 978-1-4215-1675-2
24	Love and Death	July 17, 1999; 978-4-09-125494-8	July 15, 2008; 978-1-4215-1676-9
25	Along Came A Spider	October 18, 1999; 978-4-09-125495-5	September 16, 2008; 978-1-4215-1677-6
26	The Play's the Thing	February 18, 2000; 978-4-09-125496-2	November 18, 2008; 978-1-4215-1678-3
27	Game On	April 18, 2000; 978-4-09-125497-9	January 20, 2009; 978-1-4215-1679-0
28	The Mermaid Vanishes	July 18, 2000; 978-4-09-125498-6	March 17, 2009; 978-1-4215-2196-1
29	What Ms. Jodie Saw	September 18, 2000; 978-4-09-125499-3	May 19, 2009; 978-1-4215-2197-8
30	The Kaido Game	December 18, 2000; 978-4-09-125500-6	July 21, 2009; 978-1-4215-2198-5
31	Too Many Moores	March 17, 2001; 978-4-09-126161-8	September 15, 2009; 978-1-4215-2199-2
32	You're History	April 18, 2001; 978-4-09-126162-5	November 17, 2009; 978-1-4215-2884-7
33	Valentine's Day Massacre	July 18, 2001; 978-4-09-126163-2	January 19, 2010; 978-1-4215-2884-7
34	The Unusual Suspects	September 18, 2001; 978-4-09-126164-9	April 13, 2010; 978-1-4215-2885-4
35	Greek Tragedy	December 18, 2001; 978-4-09-126165-6	July 13, 2010; 978-1-4215-2886-1
36	With a Bang	February 18, 2002; 978-4-09-126166-3	October 12, 2010; 978-1-4215-2887-8
37	A Study in Black	April 18, 2002; 978-4-09-126167-0	January 11, 2011; 978-1-4215-2888-5
38	On the Ropes	July 18, 2002; 978-4-09-126168-7	April 12, 2011; 978-1-4215-2889-2
39	The Adventure of the Scarlet Blaze	November 18, 2002; 978-4-09-126169-4	July 12, 2011; 978-1-4215-3499-2
40	A Kiss Before Sleuthing	February 18, 2003; 978-4-09-126170-0	October 11, 2011; 978-1-4215-3500-5

=== Volumes 41–60 ===
No.	Title	Original release date	English release date
41	Ladies' Night	April 9, 2003; 978-4-09-126411-4	January 10, 2012; 978-1-4215-3607-1
42	The Woman in Black	July 18, 2003; 978-4-09-126412-1	April 10, 2012; 978-1-4215-3608-8
43	The Game's Afoot	October 18, 2003; 978-4-09-126413-8	July 10, 2012; 978-1-4215-3609-5
44	How To Steal A Wonder	January 17, 2004; 978-4-09-126414-5	October 9, 2012; 978-1-4215-3610-1
45	Dead Calm	April 5, 2004; 978-4-09-126415-2	January 8, 2013; 978-1-4215-3611-8
46	Arson, with Occasional Music	July 16, 2004; 978-4-09-126416-9	April 9, 2013; 978-1-4215-3612-5
47	Rachel Rings Twice	October 18, 2004; 978-4-09-126417-6	July 9, 2013; 978-1-4215-3613-2
48	Death Comes As the Beginning	January 14, 2005; 978-4-09-126418-3	October 8, 2013; 978-1-4215-3614-9
49	The Day of the Jekyll	April 6, 2005; 978-4-09-126419-0	January 14, 2014; 978-1-4215-5506-5
50	Murder On the Slopes	July 15, 2005; 978-4-09-126420-6	April 8, 2014; 978-1-4215-5507-2
51	The Cat Who Read Japanese	October 18, 2005; 978-4-09-127361-1	July 8, 2014; 978-1-4215-6507-1
52	The Woman in White	January 14, 2006; 978-4-09-120026-6	October 14, 2014; 978-1-4215-6508-8
53	From Kaito, With Love	February 17, 2006; 978-4-09-120110-2	January 13, 2015; 978-1-4215-6509-5
54	The Moving Shrine Room	June 16, 2006; 978-4-09-120377-9	April 14, 2015; 978-1-4215-6510-1
55	The Mystery of Lavender Manor	September 15, 2006; 978-4-09-120628-2	July 14, 2015; 978-1-4215-7784-5
56	Season of The Witch	January 13, 2007; 978-4-09-120706-7	October 13, 2015; 978-1-4215-7784-5
57	A Devil of a Case	April 5, 2007; 978-40-91-21110-1	January 12, 2016; 978-1-4215-7785-2
58	The Clash of Red and Black	July 18, 2007; 978-4-09-121155-2	April 12, 2016; 978-1-4215-7786-9
59	Hair Today, Gone Tomorrow	October 18, 2007; 978-4-09-121199-6	July 12, 2016; 978-1-4215-8385-3
60	Grounds for Murder	January 12, 2008; 978-4-09-121266-5	October 11, 2016; 978-1-4215-8386-0

=== Volumes 61–80 ===
No.	Title	Original release date	English release date
61	Shoes to Die For	April 3, 2008; 978-4-09-121340-2	January 10, 2017; 978-1-4215-8684-7
62	The Kudo Identity	August 11, 2008; 978-4-09-121464-5	April 11, 2017; 978-1-4215-8685-4
63	Conan Dreams of Sushi	November 7, 2008; 978-4-09-121513-0	July 11, 2017; 978-1-4215-9444-6
64	Old Scars	April 2, 2009; 978-4-09-121892-6	October 10, 2017; 978-1-42-159445-3
65	The Red Wall	August 18, 2009; 978-4-09-121717-2	January 9, 2018; 978-1-42-159689-1
66	Cherry Blossom Confidential	November 18, 2009; 978-4-09-122048-6	April 10, 2018; 978-1-42-159708-9
67	Fashion Emergency	February 18, 2010; 978-4-09-122146-9	July 10, 2018; 978-14215-9860-4
68	The Kirin's Horn	May 18, 2010; 978-4-09-122290-9	October 9, 2018; 978-14215-9861-1
69	The Shape of Murder	August 18, 2010; 978-4-09-122500-9	January 8, 2019; 978-14215-9867-3
70	You're History	November 18, 2010; 978-4-09-122658-7	April 9, 2019; 978-14215-9868-0
71	The Game Is Afoot	February 18, 2011; 978-4-09-122780-5	July 9, 2019; 978-1-9747-0655-6
72	In the Cards	June 17, 2011; 978-4-09-122898-7	October 8, 2019; 978-1-9747-0656-3
73	Out of Time	September 16, 2011; 978-4-09-123235-9	January 20, 2020; 978-1-9747-0961-8
74	An Eye for an Eye	December 14, 2011; 978-4-09-123428-5	April 14, 2020; 978-1-9747-0962-5
75	More Moores	April 14, 2012; 978-4-09-123738-5	July 14, 2020; 978-1-9747-1495-7
76	Detectives’ Nocturne	June 18, 2012; 978-4-09-123738-5	October 13, 2020; 978-1-9747-1700-2
77	The Sign of the Three	September 18, 2012; 978-4-09-123806-1	January 12, 2021; 978-1-9747-1496-4
78	Mystery Train	December 18, 2012; 978-4-09-124031-6	April 13, 2021; 978-1-9747-2060-6
79	Conan Edogawa's Dracula	April 18, 2013; 978-4-09-124291-4	July 13, 2021; 978-1-9747-2114-6
80	Cold Case	July 18, 2013; 978-4-09-124324-9	October 12, 2021; 978-1-9747-2115-3

=== Volumes 81–100 ===
No.	Title	Original release date	English release date
81	The Drinking Detective	November 18, 2013; 978-4-09-124499-4	January 11, 2022; 978-1-9747-2116-0
82	The Purr-fect Crime	January 17, 2014; 978-4-09-124551-9	April 12, 2022; 978-1-9747-2117-7
83	Red Death	April 18, 2014; 978-4-09-125028-5	August 16, 2022; 978-1-9747-2909-8
84	A Shot of Bourbon	July 18, 2014; 978-4-09-124620-2	October 11, 2022; 978-1-9747-2910-4
85	Checkmate	December 18, 2014; 978-4-09-125376-7	January 10, 2023; 978-1-9747-3267-8
86	Dark Rum	April 17, 2015; 978-4-09-125817-5	April 11, 2023; 978-1-9747-3268-5
87	Murder, She Blogged	August 18, 2015; 978-4-09-126209-7	July 11, 2023; 978-1-9747-3743-7
88	Battle of the Bands	December 18, 2015; 978-4-09-126540-1	October 10, 2023; 978-1-9747-4057-4
89	Unidentified Forensic Objects	April 15, 2016; 978-4-09-127089-4	January 9, 2024; 978-1-9747-4282-0
90	Black Death	August 18, 2016; 978-4-09-127330-7	April 9, 2024; 978-1-9747-4338-4
91	Fly Me to the Moonstone	December 16, 2016; 978-4-09-127330-7	July 9, 2024; 978-1-9747-4600-2
92	The Shivering Sands	April 12, 2017; 978-4-09-127553-0	October 8, 2024; 978-1-9747-4896-9
93	The Secret Adversary	July 18, 2017; 978-4-09-127553-0	January 14, 2025; 978-1-9747-5153-2
94	Sweet Mystery of Love	December 18, 2017; 978-4-09-127883-8	April 8, 2025; 978-1-9747-5239-3
95	Kiss Me Redly	October 18, 2018; 978-4-09-128560-7	July 8, 2025; 978-1-9747-5540-0
96	Yield to Murder	April 10, 2019; 978-4-09-129179-0	October 14, 2025; 978-1-9747-5853-1
97	The Chef Who Came in from the Cold	December 18, 2019; 978-4-09-129449-4	January 13, 2026; 978-1-9747-6184-5
98	The Fourth Man	April 15, 2020; 978-4-09-850059-8	April 14, 2026; 978-1-9747-6252-1
99	Fowl Play	April 14, 2021; 978-4-09-850513-5	July 14, 2026; 978-1-9747-6509-6
100	Back in Black	October 18, 2021; 978-4-09-850717-7	October 13, 2026; 978-1-97-476546-1

=== Volumes 101–current ===
No.	Title	Original release date	English release date
101		April 13, 2022; 978-4-09-851054-2	January 12, 2027; 978-1-97-476610-9
102		September 15, 2022; 978-4-09-851255-3	April 13, 2027; 978-1-97-476611-6
103		April 12, 2023; 978-4-09-852026-8	—
104		October 18, 2023; 978-4-09-852850-9	—
105		April 10, 2024; 978-4-09-853217-9	—
106		October 18, 2024; 978-4-09-853633-7	—
107		April 18, 2025; 978-4-09-854079-2	—
108		April 8, 2026; 978-4-09-854532-2	—

== Manga Special Editions ==
Special editions that are drawn by Aoyama's assistants and do not belong to the main plot. Forty-three volumes have been released as of May 2018.

No.	Japanese release date	Japanese ISBN
1	January 28, 1997	4-09-142531-3
2	October 28, 1997	4-09-142532-1
3	November 28, 1997	4-09-142533-X
4	March 18, 1998	4-09-142534-8
5	April 18, 1998	4-09-142535-6
6	January 28, 1999	4-09-142536-4
7	April 26, 1999	4-09-142537-2
8	August 7, 1999	4-09-142538-0
9	December 18, 1999	4-09-142539-9
10	March 28, 2000	4-09-142540-2
11	May 27, 2000	4-09-142781-2
12	December 25, 2000	4-09-142782-0
13	May 28, 2001	4-09-142783-9
14	August 28, 2001	4-09-142784-7
15	March 28, 2002	4-09-142785-5
16	August 28, 2002	4-09-142786-3
17	January 28, 2003	4-09-142787-1
18	March 28, 2003	4-09-142788-X
19	May 28, 2003	4-09-142789-8
20	December 24, 2003	4-09-142790-1
21	April 1, 2004	4-09-143191-7
22	August 27, 2004	4-09-143192-5
23	December 24, 2004	4-09-143193-3
24	March 28, 2005	4-09-143194-1
25	April 26, 2005	4-09-143195-X
26	December 24, 2005	4-09-140079-5
27	February 27, 2006	4-09-140094-9
28	October 27, 2006	4-09-140255-0
29	December 25, 2006	4-09-140315-8
30	November 28, 2007	978-4-09-140415-2
31	December 25, 2007	978-4-09-140457-2
32	November 27, 2008	978-4-09-140730-6
33	December 25, 2008	978-4-09-140745-0
34	July 28, 2009	978-4-09-140813-6
35	December 25, 2009	978-4-09-140878-5
36	July 28, 2010	978-4-09-141056-6
37	November 28, 2011	978-4-09-141368-0
38	July 27, 2012	978-4-09-141460-1
39	October 28, 2014	978-4-09-141830-2
40	December 28, 2015	978-4-09-142108-1
41	October 28, 2016	978-4-09-142237-8
42	July 28, 2017	978-4-09-142409-9
43	May 28, 2018	978-4-09-142674-1

== Anime films ==
No.	Title	Original release date	Part 2 release date
1	Detective Conan Movie: The Time-Bombed Skyscraper; Gekijōban Meitantei Conan: Tokei-jikake no matenrō (劇場版名探偵コナン 時計じかけの摩天楼)	September 18, 1997; 978-4-09-124871-8	October 18, 1997; 978-4-09-124872-5
2	Detective Conan Movie: The Fourteenth Target; Gekijōban Meitantei Conan: Jūyonbanme no tagetto (劇場版名探偵コナン 14番目の標的)	September 18, 1998; 978-4-09-124873-2	October 17, 1998; 978-4-09-124874-9
3	Detective Conan Movie: The Last Wizard of the Century; Gekijōban Meitantei Conan: Seikimatsu no majutsushi (劇場版名探偵コナン 世紀末の魔術師)	September 18, 1999; 978-4-09-124875-6	October 18, 1999; 978-4-09-124876-3
4	Detective Conan Movie: Captured in Her Eyes; Gekijōban Meitantei Conan: Hitomi no naka no ansatsusha (劇場版名探偵コナン 瞳の中の暗殺者)	September 18, 2000; 978-4-09-124877-0	October 18, 2000; 978-4-09-124878-7
5	Detective Conan Movie: Countdown to Heaven; Gekijōban Meitantei Conan: Tengoku e no kauntodaun (劇場版名探偵コナン 天国へのカウントダウン)	November 17, 2001; 978-4-09-124879-4	December 18, 2001; 978-4-09-124880-0
6	Detective Conan Movie: Phantom of Baker Street; Gekijōban Meitantei Conan: Beikā Sutorīto no bōrei (劇場版名探偵コナン ベイカー街の亡霊)	October 18, 2002; 978-4-09-126851-8	November 18, 2002; 978-4-09-126852-5
7	Detective Conan Movie: Crossroads of the Ancient Capital; Gekijōban Meitantei Conan: Meikyū no kurosurōdo (劇場版名探偵コナン 迷宮の十字路)	November 18, 2003; 978-4-09-127751-0	December 18, 2003; 978-4-09-127752-7
8	Detective Conan Movie: Magician of the Silver Sky; Gekijōban Meitantei Conan: Gin'yoku no majishan (劇場版名探偵コナン 銀翼の奇術師)	November 18, 2004; 978-4-09-127753-4	December 17, 2004; 978-4-09-127754-1
9	Detective Conan Movie: Strategy Above the Depths; Gekijōban Meitantei Conan: Suiheisenjō no sutoratejī (劇場版名探偵コナン 水平線上の陰謀)	November 18, 2005; 978-4-09-120024-2	December 15, 2005; 978-4-09-120025-9
10	Detective Conan Movie: The Private Eyes' Requiem; Gekijōban Meitantei Conan: Tantei-tachi no rekuiemu (劇場版名探偵コナン 探偵たちの鎮魂歌)	November 18, 2006; 978-4-09-120808-8	December 18, 2006; 978-4-09-120809-5
11	Detective Conan Movie: Jolly Roger in the Deep Azure; Gekijōban Meitantei Conan: Konpeki no Jorī Rojā (劇場版名探偵コナン 紺碧の棺)	November 16, 2007; 978-4-09-121194-1	December 15, 2007; 978-4-09-121195-8
12	Detective Conan Movie: Full Score of Fear; Gekijōban Meitantei Conan: Senritsu no furu sukoa (劇場版名探偵コナン 戦慄の楽譜)	November 18, 2008; 978-4-09-121475-1	December 18, 2008; 978-4-09-121476-8
13	Detective Conan Movie: The Raven Chaser; Gekijōban Meitantei Conan: Shikkoku no cheisā (劇場版名探偵コナン 漆黒の追跡者)	November 18, 2009; 978-4-09-122057-8	December 18, 2009; 978-4-09-122058-5
14	Detective Conan Movie: The Lost Ship in the Sky; Gekijōban Meitantei Conan: Tenkuu no Rosuto Shippu (劇場版名探偵コナン 天空の難破船)	November 18, 2010; 978-4-09-122574-0	December 17, 2010; 978-4-09-122575-7
15	Detective Conan Movie: Quarter of Silence; Gekijōban Meitantei Conan: Chinmoku no Kwōtā (劇場版名探偵コナン 沈黙の15分)	November 18, 2011; 978-4-09-122574-0	December 14, 2011; 978-4-09-122575-7
