= Chasse =

Chasse, chassé, or châsse may refer to:

- Chassé, a dance step.
- Chasse (casket), a medieval casket with sloping roofs like a house
- David Hendrik Chassé, Dutch military commander and Napoleontic general
- Chassé, Sarthe, a commune of the Sarthe department, France
- Chasse-sur-Rhône, a commune of the Isère department, France
- "Chasse" (song), a song by Kaori Utatsuki

== See also ==
- Chase (disambiguation)
- Chesse, a surname
- Chassis, pronounced similarly
