= Birdy the Mighty =

Japanese manga series by Masami Yuki

- Cover of the original series volume, featuring Birdy Cephon Altera

鉄腕バーディー (Tetsuwan Birdy)
- Genre: Action; Science fiction comedy
- Manga
- Written by: Masami Yuki
- Published by: Shogakukan
- Imprint: Shōnen Sunday Books
- Magazine: Shōnen Sunday Zōkan
- Original run: 1985 – 1988
- Volumes: 1
- Original video animation
- Directed by: Yoshiaki Kawajiri
- Produced by: Masao Maruyama; Atsushi Sugita; Fumio Ueda; Kazuhiko Ikeguchi; Satoshi Yoshimoto
- Written by: Chiaki J. Konaka (1–3); Yoshiaki Kawajiri (3–4)
- Music by: Kow Otani
- Studio: Madhouse
- Licensed by: NA: US Manga Corps
- Released: July 25, 1996 – February 25, 1997
- Runtime: 29–40 minutes (each)
- Episodes: 4
- Manga
- Written by: Masami Yuki
- Published by: Shogakukan
- Magazine: Weekly Young Sunday; (December 26, 2002 – July 31, 2008); Weekly Big Comic Spirits; (September 6–22, 2008)
- Original run: December 26, 2002 – September 22, 2008
- Volumes: 20
- Anime television series

Birdy the Mighty: Decode
- Directed by: Kazuki Akane
- Produced by: Narue Minami
- Written by: Hiroshi Ōnogi; Seishi Minakami; (OVA, 14–25)
- Music by: Yugo Kanno
- Studio: A-1 Pictures
- Licensed by: AUS: Madman Entertainment; NA: Funimation (expired); UK: Manga Entertainment
- Original network: TV Saitama, tvk, KBS, Sun TV, Tokyo MX, BS11, TBC, TVQ Kyushu, Okinawa TV, CBC, Chiba TV, Hokkaido Broadcasting
- English network: US: Funimation Channel
- Original run: July 5, 2008 – March 28, 2009
- Episodes: 25 + OVA
- Manga

Birdy the Mighty: Evolution
- Written by: Masami Yuki
- Published by: Shogakukan
- Magazine: Weekly Big Comic Spirits
- Original run: October 11, 2008 – August 27, 2012
- Volumes: 13
- icon

Birdy the Mighty (Japanese: 鉄腕バーディー, Hepburn: Tetsuwan Bādī; lit. 'Iron-Armed Birdy') is a Japanese manga series written and illustrated by Masami Yuki. His initial attempt with the story ran in Shogakukan's Shōnen Sunday Zōkan from 1985 to 1988, but it was eventually abandoned. Over a decade later, Yuki began a reboot, which was serialized in Weekly Young Sunday (2002–2008) and Weekly Big Comic Spirits (2008); its chapters were collected in 20 tankōbon volumes. A sequel, titled Birdy the Mighty: Evolution, was serialized in Weekly Big Comic Spirits from 2008 to 2012, with its chapters collected in 13 tankōbon volumes.

In 1996, Birdy the Mighty was adapted into a four-episode original video animation (OVA) directed by Yoshiaki Kawajiri. A 25-episode anime television series adaptation, titled Birdy the Mighty: Decode, animated by A-1 Pictures and produced by Aniplex, was broadcast for two seasons from July 2008 to March 2009.

== Plot ==
Birdy Cephon Altera is a Federation agent whose mission is to pursue interplanetary criminals on the planet Earth. While pursuing a criminal suspect, she inadvertently kills a high school student named Tsutomu Senkawa. However, there is a method to ensure his survival. He is integrated into Birdy's body, and this union must persist until the completion of his physical restoration. Tsutomu must share a body with Birdy while concealing her existence from his family and friends, as Birdy also conducts her investigation. They join forces to combat a clandestine extraterrestrial group that is planning to conduct experiments on unsuspecting Earth inhabitants.

== Characters ==
=== Main ===
Tsutomu Senkawa (left) and Birdy Cephon Altera (right)

Birdy Cephon Altera
Voiced by: Kotono Mitsuishi (Japanese); Alex McCord (English) (OVA)
Voiced by: Saeko Chiba (Japanese); Luci Christian (English) (TV)
A Federation police officer, she arrives on Earth in pursuit of alien criminals who are using the planet as a refuge. During one of her missions, she accidentally kills Tsutomu and has to fuse with him in order to keep him alive. In Birdy the Mighty Decode, she meets her childhood friend Nataru later admitting to Tsutomu that she is indeed in love with Nataru.

In the 2008 anime, her false identity on Earth is rising Japanese idol Shion Arita. She is accompanied by a robot named "Tuto". Birdy is an "Altan", a human-like alien, possibly from a planet orbiting the star Altair. More specifically, Birdy is an "Ixioran Altairian", a bio-engineered supersoldier bred for combat.

Tsutomu Senkawa
Voiced by: Tetsuya Iwanaga (Japanese); Justin Thompson (English) (OVA)
Voiced by: Miyu Irino (Japanese); Micah Solusod (English) (TV)
A high school student who has his mind hosted within Birdy after being killed during her confrontation with an alien criminal. Birdy tries to let him live a normal life until his body is rebuilt.

=== Civilians ===
Natsumi Hayamiya
Voiced by: Yukana Nogami (Japanese); Matty O'Shea (English) (OVA)
Voiced by: Kanae Itō (Japanese); Cherami Leigh (English) (TV)
Tsutomu's friend and classmate. In the OVA, she has a more prominent role whilst in the TV show she is just a minor character.
Hazumi Senkawa
Voiced by: Tomoko Maruo (Japanese); Debora Rabbai (English) (OVA)
Voiced by: Mikako Takahashi (Japanese); Jamie Marchi (English) (TV)
Tsutomu's older sister. She does not live with Tsutomu and is rarely seen on the show. She comes by for random inspections and is first seen in the first episode saying goodbye to their parents.
Sayaka Nakasugi
Voiced by: Maaya Sakamoto (Japanese); Brina Palencia (English) (TV)
A classmate of Tsutomu, Sayaka was originally a sickly girl until she was involved in a near fatal car accident and became the vessel for the superweapon, Ryunka. After fusing with Ryunka, Sayaka became far more cheerful and social, eventually becoming romantically involved with Tsutomu.
Shoko Kagami
Voiced by: Ayako Kawasumi (Japanese); Maxey Whitehead (English) (TV)
A young girl whose legs are recovering. She is very fond of Nataru and tends to be hostile towards Birdy because she thinks Birdy's trying to 'steal' him from her. She had also lost her older brother in the Ryunka incident.

=== Aliens ===
Capella Titis
Voiced by: Kaori Nazuka (Japanese); Trina Nishimura (English) (TV)
An Altarian antagonist who works for Irma later on.
George Gomez
Voiced by: Akio Ōtsuka (Japanese); Cory Carthew (English) (OVA)
Voiced by: Unshō Ishizuka (Japanese); Newton Pittman (English) (TV)
An alien criminal who had been hiding on Earth in disguise. He is an Altarian henchman of Christella Revi.
Christella Revi
Voiced by: Mako Hyōdō (Japanese); Mary Alice McGuire (English) (OVA)
Voiced by: Mako Hyōdō (Japanese); Monica Rial (English) (TV)
A rogue alien scientist who is the antagonist of the story.
Nataru Shinmyou
Voiced by: Masaya Matsukaze (Japanese); Eric Vale (English)
Birdy's childhood friend. He lives on Earth as a refugee and pretends to be a human. Nataru is an Ixioran like Birdy and has the ability to teleport. In Birdy the Mighty Decode, he confesses to Birdy saying he is in love with her.
Skelezzo
Voiced by: Norio Wakamoto (Japanese); Christopher Sabat (English)
Skelezzo was once Birdy's advisor. He now resides on Altaria.

== Media ==
=== Manga ===
First volume cover of the 2002 series

Written and illustrated by Masami Yuki, Birdy the Mighty was serialized in Shogakukan's shōnen manga magazine Shōnen Sunday Zōkan from 1985 to 1988, being serialized while Yuki was working on Kyūkyoku Chōjin R in Weekly Shōnen Sunday. Yuki eventually abandoned the project, leaving it unfinished. Shogakukan released a single volume, which was listed as "volume 1", on July 18, 1996.

Over a decade later after its original run, Yuki decided to make a reboot of the manga, keeping certain details from the original work. The series ran in Shogakukan's seinen manga magazine Weekly Young Sunday from December 26, 2002, until the magazine ceased its publication on July 31, 2008. It later ran in Weekly Big Comic Spirits from September 6–22, 2008. Shogakukan collected its chapters in twenty tankōbon volumes, released from June 5, 2003, to October 3, 2008.

A sequel, titled Birdy the Mighty: Evolution, was serialized in Weekly Big Comic Spirits from October 11, 2008, to July 23, 2012. An epilogue chapter was published in Monthly Big Comic Spirits on August 27, 2012. Shogakukan collected its chapters in thirteen tankōbon volumes, released from February 27, 2009, to September 28, 2012.

=== Original video animation ===
The original Birdy the Mighty manga was adapted into a four-episode original video animation (OVA) by Madhouse and directed by Yoshiaki Kawajiri, released by Bandai Visual on VHS from July 25, 1996, to February 25, 1997. The four episodes were later re-released on DVD on June 25, 2001.

In North America, the OVA was licensed by Central Park Media, who released the episodes on two VHS sets in 1999, and on two DVD sets in 2004. The OVA was broadcast with an English dub on Starz Encore's Action channel in 2000. Central Park Media discontinued the series' distribution in 2006, before filing for bankruptcy in 2009.

=== Anime television series ===
An anime television series adaptation was announced by Weekly Young Sunday in 2006. Titled Birdy the Mighty: Decode (鉄腕バーディー DECODE, Tetsuwan Bādī Dekōdo), the series was animated by A-1 Pictures and directed by Kazuki Akane, with Hiroshi Ōnogi handling the series' scripts. The series was first broadcast on TV Saitama (and later on twelve other terrestrial stations) for thirteen episodes from July 5 to September 27, 2008. (Note: TV Saitama listed the air dates for the series on Friday at 25:00, which is effectively Saturday at 1:00 a.m. JST.) Aniplex collected the episodes in seven DVDs, released from September 24, 2008, to March 25, 2009.

The series was followed by a second season, Birdy the Mighty: Decode 02, which was broadcast for twelve episodes from January 10 to March 28, 2009. (Note: TV Saitama listed the air dates for the series on Friday at 25:00, which is effectively Saturday at 1:00 a.m. JST.) Aniplex collected the episodes in six DVDs, released from April 22 to July 1, 2009. An unaired episode that connects the first and second seasons was included with the special DVD "Birdy the Mighty Decode: The Cipher", released on July 22, 2009.

In North America, the series was licensed by Funimation in 2009. The rights to the series expired on October 14, 2016.

=== Soundtracks ===
The music for Birdy the Mighty: Decode was composed by Yugo Kanno. The original soundtrack was released on September 24, 2008. The original soundtrack of Birdy the Mighty: Decode 02 was released on April 22, 2009. The first opening theme song is "Sora" (そら; lit. 'Sky'), performed by Hearts Grow, while the first ending theme song is "Let's Go Together", performed by Afromania. The second opening theme song is "Kiseki" (lit. 'Miracle'), performed by Nirgilis, while the second ending theme song is "Tane" (タネ; lit. 'Seeds'), performed by no3b.

== Reception ==
Since its release in the West, Birdy the Mighty: Decode has received generally favorable reviews. Bryan Morton, from The Fandom Post, was positive toward the first season, citing the visuals and action as factors for it. In his review of the second season, while Morton stated that it was as enjoyable as the first, he was more critical of it. Several criticisms were drawn to Tsutomu and his friends being more sidelined in the story, and the animation, which he described as "appearing to have been animated on a shoestring budget." Bob Muir, from Japanator, noted the ending for the show made it feel rushed, but overall recommended the series, calling it "...just plain fun, with no insipid moe characters or deathly serious world domination plots to drag it down." Josh Viel of the Escapist, praised the visuals and soundtrack of the first season, bringing particular mention to the show's use of foreshadowing. On DVDTalk, Todd Douglass Jr. commended both seasons for their character development, though criticized the pacing of the first season, as well as the antagonists, calling one of them "... more of a Cigarette Smoking Man kind of guy and really seems to just be some shadowy figure doing what he wants to do in the sidelines." Further criticisms were directed toward the second season for having the same issues, but he still recommended the series as a whole.

== Legacy ==
Zack Snyder said the Birdy the Mighty anime series was an inspiration for his take on Man of Steel.
