= End of Refrain: Chiisana Hajimari =

Single by Kaori Utatsuki
- B-side: "Senecio: I've in Budokan 2009 Live Ver."
- Released: July 29, 2009
- Genre: J-pop
- Length: 13:08
- Label: Geneon
- Songwriter(s): Lyrics: Kotoko; Composition: Tomoyuki Nakazawa
- Producer(s): I've Sound

Kaori Utatsuki singles chronology
"Chasse" (2007)	"End of Refrain: Chiisana Hajimari" (2009)

"End of Refrain: Chiisana Hajimari" (小さな始まり) is a maxi-single released by J-pop singer Kaori Utatsuki on July 29, 2009. This single was also on the I've Sound 10th Anniversary 「Departed to the future」 Special CD BOX, which was released on March 25, 2009.

The coupling song "Senecio: I've in Budokan 2009 Live Ver." is the live version of her first theme song with I've Sound that she performed in their concert in Budokan last January 2, 2009.

The single was released in a limited CD+DVD edition (GNCV-0021). The DVD contains the Promotional Video for "End of Refrain: Chiisana Hajimari".

== Track listing ==
1. End of Refrain: Chiisana Hajimari (小さな始まり)—4:33
  Lyrics: Kotoko
  Composition: Tomoyuki Nakazawa
  Arrangement: Tomoyuki Nakazawa, Takeshi Ozaki
2. Senecio: I've in Budokan 2009 Live Ver. -- 4:04
  Lyrics: Kotoko
  Composition/Arrangement: Tomoyuki Nakazawa
3. End of Refrain: Chiisana Hajimari (instrumental) (小さな始まり)—4:31

== I've Sound 10th Anniversary 「Departed to the future」 Special CD BOX sales trajectory ==
Year	Daily rank	Weekly rank	Sales
2009	21	43	4,339
