= Strangers Either Way =

2002 non-fiction book by Jasna Čapo Žmegač

Strangers Either Way: The Lives of Croatian Refugees in their New Home
- Author: Jasna Čapo Žmegač
- Original title: Srijemski Hrvati. Etnološka studija migracije, identifikacije i interakcije
- Translator: Nina H. Antoljak and Mateusz M. Stanojević
- Language: Croatian
- Publisher: Durieux, Berghahn Books
- Publication date: 2002
- Publication place: Croatia
- English publication date: 2007
- ISBN: 978-9-531-88145-6

Strangers Either Way: The Lives of Croatian Refugees in their New Home (Croatian: Srijemski Hrvati. Etnološka studija migracije, identifikacije i interakcije, lit. 'Syrmian Croats. Ethnological Study of Migration, Identification and Interaction') is a book by Croatian ethnologist Jasna Čapo Žmegač. It was published in Croatian in 2002 by Durieux. An English translation by Nina H. Antoljak and Mateusz M. Stanojević was published in 2007 by Berghahn Books. The book describes Croats from Serbia who became refugees on account of the Croatian War of Independence and settled in Syrmia.
