= Shinkurō, Hashiru! =

Japanese manga series

- First tankōbon volume cover

新九郎、奔る!
- Genre: Historical
- Manga
- Written by: Masami Yuki
- Published by: Shogakukan
- Magazine: Monthly Big Comic Spirits (January 27, 2018 – October 26, 2019); Weekly Big Comic Spirits (January 11, 2020 – present)
- Original run: January 27, 2018 – present
- Volumes: 24
- icon

Shinkurō, Hashiru! (Japanese: 新九郎、奔る!; lit. 'Shinkurō, Run!') is a Japanese manga series written and illustrated by Masami Yuki. It was first serialized in Shogakukan's seinen manga magazine Monthly Big Comic Spirits from January 2018 to October 2019, and later transferred to Weekly Big Comic Spirits in January 2020.

== Synopsis ==
The series follows Ise Shinkurō Moritoki, who would later become known as Hōjō Sōun, the first head of the Later Hōjō clan, one of the most powerful samurai families in Japan in the Sengoku period. The series depicts him as a member of the Ise clan, holding public office in the Muromachi Shogunate, telling the story of how he became a feudal lord.

== Publication ==
Written and illustrated by Masami Yuki, Shinkurō, Hashiru! was first serialized in Shogakukan's seinen manga magazine Monthly Big Comic Spirits from January 27, 2018, to October 26, 2019, and it was later transferred to Weekly Big Comic Spirits on January 11, 2020. In May 2025, it was announced that the series would enter its final story arc. Shogakukan has collected its chapters into individual tankōbon volumes. The first volume was released on August 9, 2018. As of October 9, 2026, 24 volumes have been released.

=== Volumes ===
No.	Japanese release date	Japanese ISBN
1	August 9, 2018	978-4-09-860001-4
2	April 12, 2019	978-4-09-860334-3
3	January 10, 2020	978-4-09-860521-7
4	June 11, 2020	978-4-09-860671-9
5	October 12, 2020	978-4-09-860810-2
6	December 11, 2020	978-4-09-860829-4
7	May 12, 2021	978-4-09-861088-4
8	September 10, 2021	978-4-09-861165-2
9	February 10, 2022	978-4-09-861291-8
10	May 12, 2022	978-4-09-861368-7
11	September 12, 2022	978-4-09-861446-2
12	January 12, 2023	978-4-09-861615-2
13	April 12, 2023	978-4-09-861745-6
14	October 12, 2023	978-4-09-862581-9
15	January 12, 2024	978-4-09-862728-8
16	April 11, 2024	978-4-09-862813-1
17	August 8, 2024	978-4-09-863050-9
18	December 12, 2024	978-4-09-863117-9
19	March 12, 2025	978-4-09-863381-4
20	July 11, 2025	978-4-09-863507-8
21	October 10, 2025	978-4-09-863635-8
22	February 12, 2026	978-4-09-863857-4
23	June 11, 2026	978-4-09-864045-4
24	October 9, 2026	978-4-09-864135-2
