= Bruno Durieux =

French politician

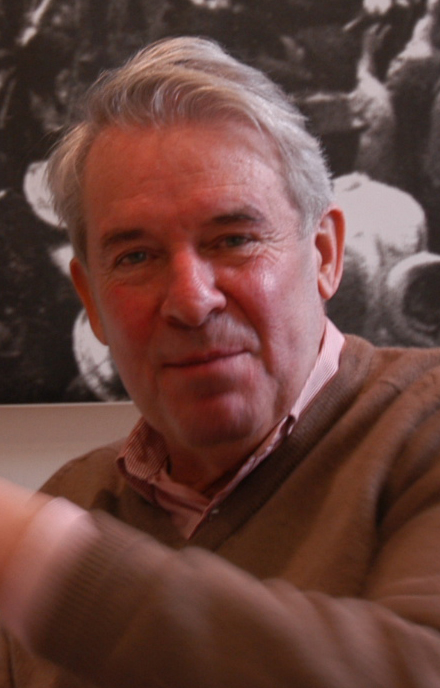

Mayor of Grignan

Personal details
- Born: 23 October 1944 (age 81) Montigny, France

Bruno Durieux (born 23 October 1944) is a French politician.

== Biography ==
Durieux is a graduate of the École polytechnique and ENSAE (École nationale de la statistique et de l'administration économique). He served in Algeria under the command of Marcel Bigeard before embarking upon an administrative career. Entering politics, Durieux served in the cabinet of Raymond Barre from 1976 to 1981, and was deputy of the Nord (département) from 1986 to 1990.

In 1990, he became a member of the Michel Rocard administration. With the change in government in 1995, he was named by the defence minister Charles Millon to represent the defence department overseas. In 1997, he was named president of the International Defence Counsel, a company 50% supported by the Ministry of Defence, with a mission of consulting on the use of French weapons in countries employing French defence systems.

He was elected mayor of Grignan in the Drôme in 1995 and was reelected in 2001 and 2008. He is the town's current mayor.
