= Magical Angel Sweet Mint =

Japanese anime television series

- Title screen for Magical Angel Sweet Mint

魔法のエンジェルスイートミント (Mahō no Enjeru Suīto Minto)
- Genre: Magical girl
- Anime television series
- Directed by: Jūtarō Ōba
- Produced by: Shinsuke Kurabayashi; Minoru Ōno; Hiroshi Katō
- Written by: Brother Noppo
- Music by: Osamu Totsuka
- Studio: Ashi Productions
- Original network: TXN (TV Tokyo)
- Original run: May 2, 1990 – March 27, 1991
- Episodes: 47

Magical Angel Sweet Mint (Japanese: 魔法のエンジェルスイートミント, Hepburn: Mahō no Enjeru Suīto Minto) is a magical girl anime TV series produced by Ashi Productions and aired from May 2, 1990, to March 27, 1991, on TV Tokyo.

== Plot ==
Magical Angel Sweet Mint anime tells the story about Mint, a young girl who is the princess of the world of dreams and magic. The natural environment of her world is only a reflection of the dreams of the people on Earth.

The World of Dreams and Magic reflect the hopes and dreams of people on Earth. That world is starting to die due to people losing faith in dreams and magic and allowing darkness to take over their hearts.

== Characters ==
Mint (ミント, Minto)
Voiced by: Hiroko Kasahara
Mint is a 12-year-old princess from Fairy Land attending school in the human world. She has a kind heart and a gentle personality. Her accessories include: the Mint Stick (her magic wand), Mint Compact (which is attached to her arm that turns into her wand and arrow), Mint Arrow (which changes her clothes just like Minky Momo), Star Accessory Earrings, and Star Necklace. Her incantation is "Parieru Remurin Sweet Mint". Mint has an insatiable appetite, and can often be seen eating hamburgers and fries about anytime during the day, even in the morning.
Waffle
Voiced by: Yuriko Fuchizaki
Waffle is Mint's pint-sized flying pet penguin.
Nuts (ナッツ, Nattsu)
Voiced by: Sakiko Tamagawa
Mint's friend who is 14 years old, Nuts loves to read and is very family-oriented. She can transform using a magical synthesizer brooch.
Plum
Voiced by: Nozomu Sasaki
One of Mint's friends, Plum has extreme vertigo, is a bit of a flirt. He is a quick thinker and helped Mint get out of some trouble with the police. He has a magical pendant.
