= Tsuyokiss =

Japanese media franchise

- Top to bottom: Tsushima, Erika, Yoshimi, Kanisawa, Nagomi

つよきす (Tsuyokisu)
- Video game

Tsuyokiss Tsuyokiss ~Mighty Heart~ Minikiss ~Tsuyokiss Fan Disc~
- Developer: Candy Soft (Windows); PrincessSoft (PS2)
- Genre: Visual novel
- Platform: Windows, PlayStation 2
- Released: August 26, 2005 (Windows); May 25, 2006 (PS2); December 15, 2006 (Minikiss)
- Video game

Tsuyokiss Nigakki Tsuyokiss Nigakki Swift Love Tsuyokiss Nigakki -Portable-
- Developer: Candy Soft (Windows); Revolution (PS2/PSP)
- Genre: Visual novel
- Platform: Windows, PlayStation 2, PlayStation Portable
- Released: April 25, 2008 (Windows); July 30, 2009 (PS2); October 28, 2010 (PSP)
- Video game

Tsuyokiss Sangakki
- Developer: Candy Soft
- Genre: Visual novel
- Platform: Windows
- Released: March 31, 2011 (Windows)
- Anime television series

Tsuyokiss Cool×Sweet
- Directed by: Shinichiro Kimura
- Written by: Yasunori Yamada
- Studio: Studio Hibari; Trinet Entertainment
- Original network: AT-X, Chiba TV, KBS Kyoto, Sun TV, Tokyo MX, TV Kanagawa, TVS
- Original run: July 1, 2006 – September 16, 2006
- Episodes: 12

Tsuyokiss (Japanese: つよきす, Hepburn: Tsuyokisu) is a Japanese visual novel that has been adapted into an anime television series directed by Shinichiro Kimura. The story focuses on a group of students at a high school and the various romantic attachments that the characters feel for each another.

Tsuyokiss originally began as an eroge for Windows by video game developer Candy Soft first released on August 26, 2005. A PlayStation 2 version of the game called Tsuyokiss ~Mighty Heart~ was released with erotic elements removed. A fan disc with some minigames for Windows named Minikiss ~Tsuyokiss Fan Disk~ was released. The anime based on the original game began airing in Japan on July 1, 2006.

Tsuyokiss Nigakki (つよきす 2学期; Tsuyokiss: The Second Term) is the sequel to Tsuyokiss, available for Windows, PlayStation 2 and PlayStation Portable. A third installment, Tsuyokiss Sangakki (つよきす 3学期; Tsuyokiss: The Third Term) was released for Windows on March 31, 2011.

== Plot ==
=== Video games ===
==== Tsuyokiss ====
Tsuyokiss is about the lives of a group of fictional high school students and the often comedic events that occur in their lives. The main protagonist is an average boy named Leo Tsushima who is secretly in love with the eldest daughter of the Kiriya Corporation and who is the student council president - Erika Kiriya.

Later, a senior female student, Otome Kurogane, knocks out several of the main characters one day when they are trying to sneak into school after being late. Surprisingly, it turns out that she is Leo's beloved cousin that he had not seen for years. Suddenly, Otome decides to move into the same house as Leo, whose mediocre life is changing into something a bit more exciting. In the PlayStation 2 version, Leo begins to form relations with Sunao Konoe who is an old acquaintance.

==== Tsuyokiss Nigakki ====
Tsuyokiss Nigakki is the sequel to Tsuyokiss where Leo was not in love to anyone in the first term. At the beginning of the second term, Leo has been worried about what to do after graduation because he does not know what his dream is. Then, Serebu Tachibana transfers to his class and she sits down next to him.

==== Tsuyokiss Sangakki ====
Tsuyokiss Sangakki is the sequel to Tsuyokiss Nigakki where Leo was not in love with anyone during the first or second term.

=== Anime ===
The anime version's plot of Tsuyokiss differs from that of the video game's in that Sunao Konoe is the main protagonist of the story. Sunao, who finds out the school she transfers to does not have a drama club, becomes determined to form a drama club. Her main obstacle is having to prove to the student council president, Erika Kiriya, that forming a drama club would be worth her time which causes Erika to constantly offer challenges to Sunao for which she must pass in order for the club to be formed.

Characters from the Tsuyokiss visual novel appear in the anime. Leo Tsushima, the protagonist of the visual novel, is also the main male protagonist of the anime.

== Characters ==
=== Video games ===
==== Main characters ====
Leo Tsushima (対馬レオ, Tsushima Reo)
Voiced by: Kenji Nojima (Drama CD)
Leo is the main protagonist of all stories in the video games.
He is a second year student from class 2-C. His room used to be a stamping grounds of his childhood friends Kinu, Shinichi and Subaru. He admires Erika Kiriya. He has a slightly timid character now, but formerly he was a hot-blooded man. He hopes to keep his coolness after a certain event in the days of junior high school.

Otome Kurogane (鉄乙女, Kurogane Otome)
Voiced by: Yukari Aoyama
Otome is a third year student from class 3-A. Otome is a descendant of a mighty warrior. She is a master of budō and she has a superhuman athletic capability. At the school, she is the student council vice-president and the chair of the disciplinary committee. Erika Kiriya cannot disobey her. She has some weak points as she is a poor cook, is not good with mechanical appliances and hates thunder. She made a promise to Leo in their childhood that she will always protect him. During Momoyo's route in Maji de Watashi ni Koishinasai!, she was summoned by Naoe Yamato to team up with Kuki Ageha from Kimi ga Aruji de Shitsuji ga Ore de in order to defeat Momoyo.

Kinu Kanisawa (蟹沢きぬ, Kanisawa Kinu)
Voiced by: Mahiru Kaneda
Kinu is a second year student from class 2-C, Leo's classmate and one of Leo's childhood friends. She is a late riser, and so Leo usually wakes her up. Her pet name is Kani or Kanitchi. She is flushed with anger when anyone calls her by her personal name Kinu, because she has an inferiority complex due to her name. Nagomi Yashi who often quarrels with her has nicknamed her Koukakurui (甲殻類) meaning crustacea.
She is extremely short-tempered and hates to lose, and her school work is awful. She has many friends because she has a cheerful disposition. She is popular with males, so she is often confessed to. She always declines confessions since she has high standards in taste for her boyfriend.

Erika Kiriya (霧夜エリカ, Kiriya Erika)
Voiced by: Minami Hokuto
Erika is a second year student from class 2-C, Leo's classmate and the student council president who is sociable, an excellent scholar and athlete. She is nicknamed Hime (姫), meaning Princess, by peers with both respect and irony because of perfectness and haughtiness. Yoshimi Sato is her true close friend whom she can alone trust. Her family runs the large Kiriya Corporation. Her ambition is to rise on the top of the company, and control the global market.

Nagomi Yashi (椰子なごみ, Yashi Nagomi)
Voiced by: Erena Kaibara
Nagomi is a first year student from class 1-B. She has a debt of gratitude to Leo, therefore she becomes a member of student council. She dislikes that she is called "Nagomin" by Erika Kiriya. She is respectful and shows courtesy but she never uses an honorific for the upper-class student Kinu Kanisawa.
She always acts alone. In the night, she tends to appear in neighborhood of a station for certain circumstances. She has a tough character.

Inori Ōeyama (大江山祈, Ōeyama Inori)
Voiced by: Izumi Maki
Inori is Leo's homeroom teacher to his class of 2-C, and an adviser of student council. She seems to be absent minded, and is often late for school despite being the teacher. Her paths exist only in Tsuyokiss for PC and Tsuyokiss Nigakki for PSP, and her sub episode will exist in Tsuyokiss Sangakki.

Yoshimi Satou (佐藤良美, Satō Yoshimi)
Voiced by: Junko Kusayanagi
Yoshimi is a second year student from class 2-C, Leo's classmate and a member of the student council. She is popular with everyone, she is an honour student, is quick in her movements, is a good cook, and is sweet-tempered. She puts the brakes on Erika Kiriya once in a while, for Erika tends to go her own way without consulting anyone. She at first appears to be a very mature person, however, her true nature is quite the opposite. Erika is her close friend who understands her true self. She often approaches Leo, who does not notice Yoshimi's deep feelings for him.

Sunao Konoe (近衛素奈緒, Konoe Sunao)
Voiced by: Yuka Inokuchi (Tsuyokiss for PS2) Aira Kamiha (Minikiss), Mirai Yamada (Tsuyokiss Nigakki/Tsuyokiss Sangakki)
Sunao is the main protagonist of the anime series.
She is a second year student from class 2-A and the head of the drama club. Incidentally, she was Leo's classmate at junior high school. Sunao has a strong sense of justice. She hates Erika Kiriya who is self-righteous. At beginning of the story, she has a hatred for Leo, and she is hard for him to deal with. Her story was added in the PS2 version. The Minikiss for PC contains her story added sexual content with her path on the PS2 version.

Serebu Tachibana (橘瀬麗武, Tachibana Serebu)
Voiced by: Hazuki Sakura
Serebu is a transfer student to class 2-C at beginning of the second term. She carries a samurai sword named Manjushage and wears dog tag with silencer. She is Heizo Tachibana's niece and she has a superhuman athletic capability, too. She appears in the Tsuyokiss Nigakki and Tsuyokiss Sangakki.

Yang Tongfer (楊豆花, Yan Tonfa)
Voiced by: Erena Kaibara
Tongfer is a second year student from class 2-C and Leo's classmate. She is a student studying abroad from China. She and Leo seem to agree with each other, because her friend Mana gives her trouble and Leo has a hard time by Kinu.
She has appeared since Tsuyokiss for original PC version, her path exists only in Tsuyokiss Nigakki for PS2/PSP, and her sub episode will exist in Tsuyokiss Sangakki.

Mana Uraga (浦賀真名, Uraga Mana)
Voiced by: Junko Kusayanagi
Mana is a second year student from class 2-C and Leo's classmate. She comes from Kansai. Her school grades are bad. Her friends often seem to have difficulty with her because she cannot read the atmosphere of a place.
She has appeared since Tsuyokiss for original PC version, her path exists only in Tsuyokiss Nigakki for PS2/PSP, and her sub episode will exist in Tsuyokiss Sangakki.

==== Students ====
Shinichi Samesuga (鮫氷新一, Samesuga Shinichi)
Voiced by: Tsukasa Madera
Shinichi is a second year student from class 2-C, Leo's classmate and one of Leo's childhood friends. He is nicknamed Fukahire meaning shark fin soup.
He was ill-treated by his older sister, consequently he has belief that a woman has to go out of her way on man's behalf. He is perverted and likes eroge.

Subaru Date (伊達スバル, Date Subaru)
Voiced by: Takuma Sakuya (Tsuyokiss), Keigo Fuji (Tsuyokiss Nigakki/Tsuyokiss Sangakki)
Subaru is a second year student from class 2-C, Leo's classmate and one of Leo's childhood friends. He acts like an older brother of Leo and Kinu although he is the same age as them. He belongs to athletics club at the school. He is very strong in fights. He is popular with schoolgirls, but male students are afraid of him. His only friends are Leo, Kinu and Shinichi. He has loved a certain girl for a long time.

Igaguri (イガグリ)
Voiced by: Shinsuke Nakamoto
Igaguri is a second year student from class 2-C and Leo's classmate. Igaguri is his nickname, and his real name is unknown.

Noriko Nishizaki (西崎紀子, Nishizaki Noriko)
Voiced by: Izumi Maki
Noriko is a second year student from class 2-A. She is a member of public relations committee at the school. She is a poor talker, therefore she often utters indistinguishable phrases. She is usually attached to Youhei Murata, but she likes Leo in a certain girl's story.

Youhei Murata (村田洋平, Murata Youhei)
Voiced by: Shinsuke Nakamoto
Youhei is a second year student from class 2-A. He is a high-achieving student, and he belong to boxing (as one of the Japanese martial arts) club. He often is full of competitive spirit to Leo.

==== Teaching Staff ====
Heizou Tachibana (橘平蔵, Tachibana Heizō)
Voiced by: Satoru Kawanakajima (Tsuyokiss), Kyonosuke Hiruma (Tsuyokiss Nigakki/Tsuyokiss Sangakki)
Heizou has a superhuman body and mind. It is said "Japan might win World War 2 if he was around then". He looks intimidating, but he usually thinks about independence of students.

Hachimaki-sensei (鉢巻先生)
Voiced by: Tsukasa Madera
Hachimaki is a physical education teacher. He often observe girls physical education with boy students.

Akari Kirishima (霧島あかり, Kirishima Akari)
Voiced by: Yukari Aoyama
Akari is a homeroom teacher of class of 2-A and a chemistry teacher. She is friendly with girl students, but she gives a wide berth to boy students because she has a phobia about male. She appears in the Tsuyokiss Nigakki and Tsuyokiss Sangakki.

==== Others ====
Tsuchinaga (土永)
Voiced by: Satoru Kawanakajima (Tsuyokiss), Kyonosuke Hiruma (Tsuyokiss Nigakki/Tsuyokiss Sangakki)
Tsuchinaga is Inori's parrot that can speak the Japanese language fluently and has several-decades-old knowledge. He seems to like a certain girl.

Gondagawara (権田瓦)
Voiced by: Chin Gentsai
Gondagawara is Serebu's pet that can speak the Japanese language. Although he is a sea turtle, he cannot swim without goggles. He appears in the Tsuyokiss Nigakki and Tsuyokiss Sangakki.

Tencho (テンチョー, Tenchō)
Voiced by: Takuma Sakuya (Tsuyokiss), Keigo Fuji (Tsuyokiss Nigakki/Tsuyokiss Sangakki)
Tencho is a manager of the curry rice restaurant where Kinu is working part-time as a waitress.

Madam (マダム, Madamu)
Voiced by: Mahiru Kaneda
She and her husband leave their daughter Kinu to herself.

Nodoka Yashi (椰子のどか, Yashi Nodoka)
Voiced by: Erena Kaibara
Nodoka, is the mother of Nagomi, runs a flower shop.

Tennoji (天王寺, Tennōji)
Voiced by: Takuma Sakuya
Tennoji has been seeing Nodoka. He tries to have Nagomi accept Nodoka's second marriage with him.

Ikuzo Tachibana (橘幾蔵, Tachibana Ikuzō)
Voiced by: Chin Gentsai
Ikuzo is a commandant of Matsukasa navy. There are many scars on his body and he wear a patch on his left eye. He is Serebu's father and Heizo's older brother. He has superhuman athletic capability too. He appears in the Tsuyokiss Nigakki and Tsuyokiss Sangakki.

=== Anime ===
==== Main characters ====
The entire Tsuyokiss Cool×Sweet crew

Sunao Konoe (近衛素奈緒, Konoe Sunao)

Voiced by: Nana Mizuki
The main female protagonist of the story, Sunao, is a second year transfer student from class 2-A in high school who tends to have a strong personality, never being one to willingly back down. In the beginning of the story, her family moves to a new town because of her mother's work as an actress. Ever since seeing her mother acting once when she was younger, Sunao dreams of someday becoming an actress too, and likewise is very passionate about drama in general. On her first day at her new school, she adamantly wants to become a member of the drama club, though is soon informed that their school has no such club yet established. This in turn makes her very determined to start one as soon as possible, though it is proving harder than she thought.

During her first performance on stage when she was much younger, she had gotten stage fright though a little boy who was in the play managed to help her get over it. On her first day at school, she recognizes Leo as the little boy who helped her during her first play, though it took more of a reminder via her pig tails and the childish phrase daikon meaning poor actor which earned him a slap in the face.

Leo Tsushima (対馬レオ, Tsushima Reo)

Voiced by: Toshiyuki Toyonaga
The main male protagonist of the story, Leo is a second year student from class 2-C in high school. He is always hanging around with his childhood friends Shinichi Samesuga, Subaru Date, and Kinu Kanisawa often while inside the student council building. He is an average male high school student who is on the student council.

==== Students ====
Nagomi Yashi (椰子なごみ, Yashi Nagomi)

Voiced by: Yu Kobayashi
Nagomi is a first year student from class 1-B. She is usually a loner who tends to quarrel often with Kinu Kanisawa, whom she has nicknamed Kani (かに) meaning crab. She is also a good cook.

Shizuka Asada (浅田静香, Asada Shizuka)

Voiced by: Moyu Arishima
Shizuka is a second year student from class 2-A and Sunao's classmate who she meets on her first day of school. She immediately becomes a fan of Sunao later that day after witnessing a drama performance by her of a scene from the play Romeo and Juliet.

Noriko Nishizaki (西崎紀子, Nishizaki Noriko)

Voiced by: Tomoko Kaneda
Noriko is a second year student from class 2-A and Sunao's classmate. She is a strange girl who loves taking photographs of people in her class. She is never given any speaking lines but instead utters indistinguishable phrases.

Youhei Murata (村田洋平, Murata Youhei)

Voiced by: Takurou Nakakuni
Youhei is a second year student from class 2-A and Sunao's classmate. Amusingly, nobody seems to be able to get his name right.

Erika Kiriya (霧夜エリカ, Kiriya Erika)

Voiced by: Mai Nakahara
Erika is a second year student from class 2-C and Leo's classmate. She is the student council president who is nicknamed Hime (姫), meaning Princess, by her peers. As the president, she has a lot of power within the school and is often seen as an intimidating figure to overcome. While in any adaptations of the work she is inclined to flirt with other girls and even try to seduce Yoshimi, Erika are one of the canonical love interests of the protagonist in the original visual novel.

Yoshimi Satou (佐藤良美, Satō Yoshimi)

Voiced by: Mayuko Omimura
Yoshimi is a second year student from class 2-C and Leo's classmate. She is a timid girl who works alongside Erika in the student council building. Since she is not comfortable at asserting herself, she can easily be taken advantage of by Erika, who has taken the liberty to also nickname her Yoppie.

Kinu Kanisawa (蟹沢きぬ, Kanisawa Kinu)

Voiced by: Saki Fujita
Kinu is a second year student from class 2-C & Leo's classmate. She is a part time curry waitress at a restaurant named Oasis. She is one of Leo's childhood friends and is his next-door neighbor. She is extremely vulgar and childish and always says what is on her mind. Nagomi is her ultimate rival and they are constantly fighting; Kinu has nicknamed her Coconuts. Both Kinu and Nagomi enjoy picking on other and starting fights with Leo, whom they supposedly hate.

Shinichi Samesuga (鮫氷新一, Samesuga Shinichi)

Voiced by: Masashi Yabe
Shinichi is a second year student from class 2-C and Leo's classmate. He is one of Leo's childhood friends who is nicknamed "Shark". He is a hyperactive student who is known to chase pretty girls around and ask them for dates, though rarely gets what he wants.

Subaru Date (伊達スバル, Date Subaru)

Voiced by: Takehito Koyasu
Subaru is a second year student from class 2-C and Leo's classmate. He is one of Leo's childhood friends who he is often seen with. He seems to have a sensible, down-to-earth personality.

Otome Kurogane (鉄乙女, Kurogane Otome)

Voiced by: Nana Inoue
Otome is a third-year student from class 3-A at high school and carries a samurai sword around with her. She is Leo's cousin whom he has not seen for several years. She eventually moves in with Leo's family because of this. She is also in love with him.
At school, also have Ultimate rival is Serebu Tachibana, she is a member of the discipline committee.

==== Teaching Staff ====
Inori Ōeyama (大江山祈, Ōeyama Inori)

Voiced by: Kumi Sakuma
She is one of the teachers at the high school. She has a parrot named Tsuchinaga that can speak Japanese. She always seems to have a tired expression.

Heizou Tachibana (橘平蔵, Tachibana Heizou)

Voiced by: Norio Wakamoto
He is the school principal and a rather intimidating man with scars on his face.

==== Others ====
Honoka Konoe (近衛ほのか, Konoe Honoka)

Voiced by: Yoshino Nanjō
She is Sunao's younger sister currently attending grade school. She seems to be more down-to-earth than her older sister.

Tsuchinaga (土永)

Voiced by: Yoshinori Fujita
Inori's parrot that can speak the Japanese language fluently.

== Media and Development ==
=== Video games ===
Tsuyokiss's first appearance was in the form of a visual novel video game for the PC developed by Candy Soft and released on August 26, 2005. Like many games in this genre, it was first made as an eroge. Later, a PS2 version with no sexual content was developed. It was released on August 1, 2006, entitled Tsuyokiss ~Mighty Heart~. On December 15, 2006, Minikiss ~Tsuyokiss Fan Disc~ was released by Candy Soft.

The sequel entitled Tsuyokiss Nigakki to Tsuyokiss was developed by Candy Soft and went on sale on April 25, 2008. Its scenario was written by NOB because Takahiro, who is a director and a scriptwriter of Tsuyokiss, left Candy Soft. It was first made as an H-game too. Later, it was transplanted into PlayStation 2 and PlayStation Portable by Revolution without erotic elements. PlayStation 2 version entitled Tsuyokiss Swift Love was on sale on July 30, 2009, PlayStation Portable version entitled Tsuyokiss -Portable- was put on the market on October 28, 2010.

Tsuyokiss Sangakki for the PC was developed by Candy Soft on March 31, 2011. Its scenario writers are Sakaki Kasa and Kizoku Kumagawa who are outsourcers.

==== Theme songs ====
Tsuyokiss

- Opening theme: Mighty Heart ~Aruhi no Kenka, Itsumo no Koigokoro~ by Kotoko
- Ending theme: Isolation by Reina

Tsuyokiss Nigakki

- Opening theme: Swift Love ~Kenzen Danshi ni Mono Mousu~ by Kotoko
- Ending theme: Shin'ainaru Kimi to Mirai e by Rekka Katakiri

Tsuyokiss Nigakki

- Opening theme: ★Nijiiro Rock 'n' Roll by Kaori Utatsuki
- Ending theme: To Your Kiss! by Rita

=== Anime ===
The Tsuyokiss Cool×Sweet anime started airing in Japan on July 1, 2006 with a total of 12 episodes. In the R2 DVD release, each episode has extended footage at the middle of every episode, where a short (2 minutes) sketch featuring some or all of the characters is presented.

==== Episodes ====
No.	Title	Original release date
1	"Nice To Meet You! I'm Sunao Konoe!"; Transliteration: "Yoroshiku! Konoe Sunao desu!" (Japanese: よろしくッ!近衛素奈緒です!)	July 1, 2006
Sunao Konoe and her family have recently moved to a new town which makes her a transfer student to her new high school. Upon arrival, Sunao meets a multitude of other students and already starts making friends and rivals. Upon discovering the school has no drama club, she becomes very determined to create one, though the student council president still stands in her way.
2	"I Hate The Student Council!!"; Transliteration: "Seitokai nante, daikirai!!" (Japanese: 生徒会なんて、大キライ!!)	July 8, 2006
Sunao does not want to give up on creating a club for those who are fans of the theater and tries diligently to get people to join her cause. Unfortunately, the student council have had something planned for months which will squander Sunao's chances once again.
3	"Crash! Athletics and Martial Arts Festival!!"; Transliteration: "Gekitotsu! Taiiku budou matsuri!!" (Japanese: 激突! 体育武道祭!!)	July 15, 2006
The Athletics and Martial Arts Festival is about to start and Erika offers up a challenge to Sunao which is if Sunao's team can defeat hers then she will allow Sunao to form the drama club.
4	"The Summer of Coconuts"; Transliteration: "Kokonattsu no natsu" (Japanese: ココナッツの夏)	July 22, 2006
Sunao practices a play and in the process helps Nagome deal with the loss of her deceased father.
5	"Part-Time Job Has the Smell of Danger"; Transliteration: "Arubaito wa kiken na kaori" (Japanese: アルバイトは危険な香り)	July 29, 2006
Sunao begins a part-time job to buy some equipment. Turns out her new job, and co-worker, is a lot more than she bargained for.
6	"Washed Away. ..Ikashima"; Transliteration: "Nagasarete. ..Ikashima" (Japanese: 流されて...烏賊島)	August 5, 2006
At the student council's annual survival camp Sunao and Leo fall into the ocean and find themselves surrounded by sharks. Also, Leo and Otome understands the true meaning of 'daikon' and Sunao's feelings towards it.
7	"Showdown! Test GO!!"; Transliteration: "Taiketsu! Tesuto de GO!!" (Japanese: 対決! テストでGO!!)	August 12, 2006
The classes compete in a facility test with the loser to wear daikon costumes. Leo apologizes to Sunao for a past misunderstanding and her aversion to daikon disappears.
8	"The Stormy Festival!"; Transliteration: "Arashi o yobu Matsukasasai!" (Japanese: 嵐を呼ぶまつかさ祭!)	August 19, 2006
At the festival Sunao becomes isolated from everyone and spends the afternoon with Leo, alone together.
9	"The Acting Club Begins!?"; Transliteration: "Engeki doukoukai shidou!?" (Japanese: 演劇同好会始動!?)	August 26, 2006
Sunao uses the school cultural festival as a basis for forming the acting club.
10	"Rice Balls. Play. School Cultural Festival."; Transliteration: "Onigiri to butai to Ryumeisai" (Japanese: おにぎりと舞台と竜鳴祭)	September 2, 2006
Sunao finally gets to act in front of her peers, though after seeing Leo and Otome together and overhearing Otome's conversation about their closeness, Sunao becomes distracted.
11	"I Cannot Be Frank. .."; Transliteration: "Sunao ni narenakute. .." (Japanese: 素奈緒になれなくて...)	September 9, 2006
Sunao is hesitant to confront Leo about her feelings for him. Several of her friends encourage her and she learns Otome's true feelings when confronted by her.
12	"Nice To Meet You Again! I'm Sunao Konoe!"; Transliteration: "Aratamete Yoroshiku! Konoe Sunao desu!" (Japanese: 改めてよろしくッ!近衛素奈緒です!)	September 16, 2006
Sunao confesses her feelings to Leo, whom she longed for him from ten years ago. Meanwhile, Sunao faces-off with Erika in the school presidential debate by using her acting talent in front of the entire school.

==== Theme songs ====
- Opening theme: Sunao ni Narenai (素直になれない) by Little Non
- Ending theme: open by Kaori Utatsuki

=== Manga ===
The manga version, illustrated by Hamao Sumeragi and based on the videogame version, began serialization in the Comp Ace on January 26, 2006 in Japan, published by Kadokawa Shoten. The manga was collected in two tankōbon volumes.

=== Novels ===
Four novels based on the PS2 version and fifteen adult novels based on the PC version or Minikiss version were published by five publishers in Japan.

Kadokawa Shoten

- Tsuyokiss ~Mighty Heart~ Sunao ni High-tension! - ISBN 4-04-707223-0

written by Tōru Tamegai, illustrated by Hamao Sumeragi

Famitsu bunko by Enterbrain

- Tsuyokiss ~Mighty Heart~ Rindoukan no Yuurei - ISBN 4-7577-2917-0
- Tsuyokiss ~Mighty Heart~ Ochitekita Santa Claus - ISBN 4-7577-3090-X
- Tsuyokiss ~Mighty Heart~ Koutetsu no Teacher - ISBN 978-4-7577-3428-9

written by Mitsuha Kamibuki, illustrated by Maruto!

Paradigm Novels by Paradigm

- Tsuyokiss Kurogane Otome-hen - ISBN 4-89490-780-1
- Tsuyokiss Yashi Nagomi-hen - ISBN 4-89490-788-7
- Tsuyokiss Kiriya Erika-hen - ISBN 4-89490-796-8
- Tsuyokiss Kanisawa Kinu-hen - ISBN 4-89490-804-2

written by Haruka Fuse

- Tsuyokiss Konoe Sunao-hen - ISBN 978-4-89490-830-7

written by Kazuhiko Okita

Sofugare Novels by Softgarage

- Tsuyokiss Bangaihen Nakomi no Christmas - ISBN 4-86133-064-5

written by Chiruda Sasamiya, illustrated by Denki Shōgun

- Tsuyokiss Bangaihen 2 Ohanami ni ikou - ISBN 4-86133-076-9

written by Tomo Mikado, illustrated by Denki Shōgun

- Tsuyokiss Bangaihen 3 Konote ni nigirumono - ISBN 4-86133-077-7
- Tsuyokiss Bangaihen 4 Aki no Majutsu - ISBN 4-86133-085-8
- Tsuyokiss Bangaihen 5 Ai no Arashi - ISBN 978-4-86133-093-3

written by Tomo Mikado and Fūichirō Noyama, illustrated by Denki Shōgun

Nijiken Game Novels by Kill Time Communication

- Tsuyokiss another story Yashi Nagomi no Baai - ISBN 4-86032-244-4
- Tsuyokiss another story Kurokane Otome no Baai - ISBN 4-86032-285-1
- Tsuyokiss another story Kiriya Erika no Baai - ISBN 4-86032-314-9
- Tsuyokiss another story Yashi Nagomi no Baai 2 - ISBN 978-4-86032-361-5

written by Kasao Sakaki, illustrated by Jōji Shinozuka

- Tsuyokiss another story Konoe Suao no Baai - ISBN 978-4-86032-409-4

written by Kasao Sakaki, illustrated by Keiko Yoshino and Fezādo Graphic

=== Books ===
One fanbook for the PC version and one guidebook for the PS2 version were published in Japan.

=== Audio CDs ===
Four drama CDs based on the videogame were released by Softgarage. Seven character image song albums based on the PS2 version were released by Five Records. A soundtrack and Character image song album named Tsuyokiss ~Cool×Sweet~ Complete Selection based on the anime version was released by SOL BLADE/Tree Fat Samurai.

=== DVDs ===
The anime series was released in six DVDs by Trinet Entertainment in Japan.

== Reception ==
The original Tsuyokiss game was voted the 14th most interesting galge ever by readers of Dengeki G's Magazine in an August 2007 survey. The PC release was the top-selling bishoujo game in Japan from August 16 to September 15 of 2006.
