= Nirgilis =

Japanese electronic rock band

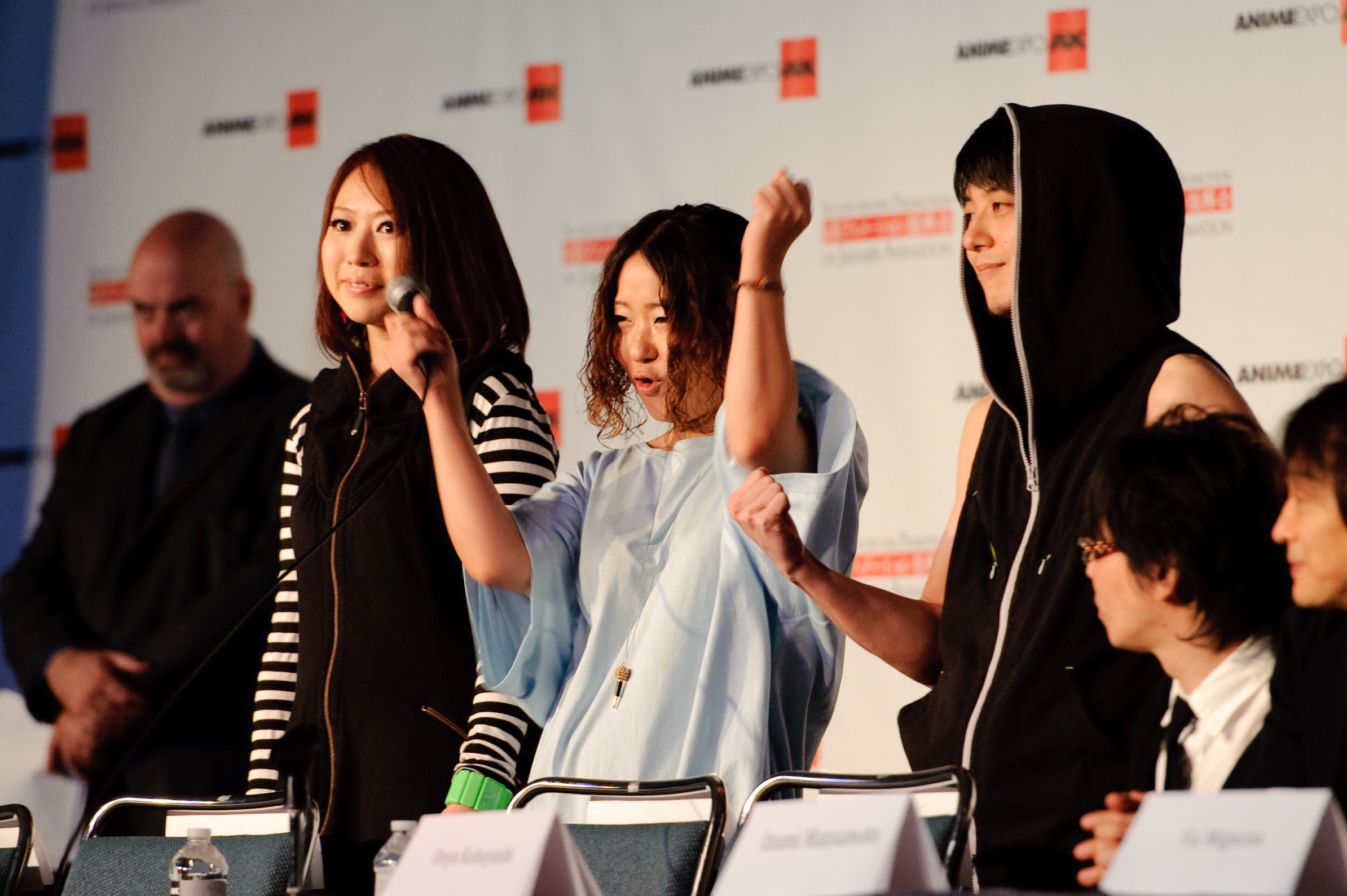
- Nirgilis at Anime Expo 2011

Background information
- Origin: Higashiosaka, Osaka, Japan
- Genres: Indietronica; alternative pop; techno; electrohop; dream pop
- Years active: 1993–2014, 2021–
- Labels: Senha and Co. (2003-2005); DefSTAR (2005-2011); AMG MUSIC (2011-2014)
- Members: Acchu Iwata; Minoru Kurihara; Yuki Inadera
- Past members: Moyo Satake; Kōki Itō
- Website: Nirgilis Official

Nirgilis (ニルギリス, Nirugirisu), stylized NIRGILIS, is a Japanese electronic rock band formed in 1993 by Moyo Satake and Kōki Itō. Acchu Iwata, Minoru Kurihara, and Yuki Inadera joined in 1995. Satake and Itō left the group in 2004 and 2007, respectively, leaving the group without its founders. All remaining members left the group in 2014. Revived in 2021 with singles nyan and Action! The group was represented by AMG Music, a subsidiary of Amusement Media Academy (アミューズメントメディア総合学院, Amyuzumento Media Gakuin).

== History ==
Nirgilis was founded in 1993 by Moyo Satake and Kōki Itō, students at Kinki University. In 1995, Acchu Iwata, Minoru Kurihara, and Yuki Inadera joined them. On 10 December 2002, the group released their first single, "Soprano." They released two more singles in 2003—"Thunder" and "Odoremi"/"Secret." The group's first album, Tennis, was released on April 30 of the same year. The "Schneider at Midnight" single was released on September 18, the last of that year.

Their traditional icon of the outline of a young girl, first appearing on their Tennis album cover, was made from the image of model Dani Odom (née Kayla Kessel).

"King"/"Ice Skating for Life"/"Lemon" was their first single of 2004, followed by the album Newstandard on May 26, including tracks produced by experimental musician Hoppy Kamiyama and techno musician Ken Ishii. 12" remixes of "Odoremi" by Herbest Moon were released on July 23. In December 2004, Moyo Satake left the band.

In June 2005, Nirgilis signed to the DefStar Records label. The "Mairebo" single, released on October 20, was their only release of the year.

On 29 January 2006, the anime series Eureka Seven began to use the Nirgilis song "sakura" as an opening theme, which was later released as a single on March 1. In 2006, Nirgilis performed during the Sony Music Festival at Yoyogi Station in Tokyo and at Osaka's Osakajo Hall. The D.Gray-man anime series began airing on 3 October 2006, with "SNOW KISS" appearing as the first ending theme. Nirgilis also released the "24 Searchlights" and "SNOW KISS" singles that year, along with the BOY album.

On 21 February 2007, the band released the GIRL album, followed by the "Update" single on March 14. In September of the same year, Kōki Itō left the band; two months later, the "Brand New Day" single was the group's first release without either of its founding members.

In 2008, the band traveled to the United States to perform at the Anime Matsuri convention in Houston, Texas from March 21 to 23, releasing the ChkChkChk album on the convention's opening day. "kiseki" appeared as the first opening theme of the Birdy the Mighty Decode:02 anime series beginning on 31 December 2008, and was released as a single on 4 March 2009. On 8 April 2009, Nirgilis released the album RGB.

Acchu Iwata stated on her Facebook page that "All members retired from Nirgilis on October 25, 2014. It was virtually dissolved."

On June 29, 2021, nirgilis.net was updated with two new songs and a statement that the original members Moyo Satake and Kōki Itō reunited with Acchu Iwata.

=== Members ===
- Moyo Satake (1993–2004, 2021–)
- Kōki Itō (1993–2007, 2021–)
- Acchu Iwata (1995–2014, 2021–)
- Minoru Kurihara (1995–2014)
- Yuki Inadera (1995–2014)

== Discography ==
=== Albums ===
- Tennis (テニス) (2003)
- Newstandard (ニュースタンダード) (2004)
- BOY (2006)
- GIRL (2007)
- ChkChkChk (チックチックチック, Chikkuchikkuchikku) (2008)
- RGB (2009)
- Chukuri (チュクリ) (2014)

=== Singles ===
- "Soprano" (ソプラノ) (2002)
- "Thunder" (サンダー) (2003)
- "Odoremi"/"Secret" (オドレミ/秘密) (2003)
- "Schneider at Midnight" (真夜中のシュナイダー) (2003)
- "King"/"Ice Skating for Life"/"Lemon" (KING／アイススケート・フォー・ライフ／LEMON) (2004)
- "Odoremi Remix" (オドレミ Remix) (2004)
- "Mairebo" (マイレボ) (2005)
- "sakura" (2006)
- "24 Searchlights" (24サーチライト) (2006)
- "SNOW KISS" (2006)
- "Update" (アップデート) (2007)
- "Brand New Day" (2007)
- "kiseki" (2009)
- "Shiny Shiny" (2011)
- "Nyan Hikari" (nyan光) (2021)
- "Action!" (2021)
- "Rhapsody in the Starry Night" (2021)
- "Emo na Kakumei" (Emoな革命) (2022)
