= Saint-Rigomer-des-Bois =

- Part of Villeneuve-en-Perseigne
- Location of Saint-Rigomer-des-Bois
- Location within France Location within Pays de la Loire
- Coordinates: 48°23′20″N 0°10′18″E
- Country: France
- Region: Pays de la Loire
- Department: Sarthe
- Arrondissement: Mamers
- Canton: Mamers
- Commune: Villeneuve-en-Perseigne
- Area^{1}: 17.53 km^{2} (6.77 sq mi)
- Highest elevation: 260 m (850 ft)
- Lowest elevation: 134 m (440 ft)
- Population (2022): 441
  - Density: 25.2/km^{2} (65.2/sq mi)
- Demonym(s): Rigomérois, Rigoméroise
- Time zone: UTC+01:00 (CET)
  - Summer (DST): UTC+02:00 (CEST)
- Postal code: 72610
- ^{1} French Land Register data, which excludes lakes, ponds, glaciers > 1 km^{2} (0.386 sq mi or 247 acres) and river estuaries.

Saint-Rigomer-des-Bois is a former commune in the Sarthe department in the region of Pays de la Loire in north-western France. In 2015 it became part of Villeneuve-en-Perseigne. Its population was 441 in 2022.

== See also ==
- Communes of the Sarthe department
- Parc naturel régional Normandie-Maine
