= Lignières-la-Carelle =

- Delegated commune of Villeneuve-en-Perseigne
- Location of Lignières-la-Carelle
- Location within France Location within Pays de la Loire
- Coordinates: 48°26′06″N 0°10′31″E
- Country: France
- Region: Pays de la Loire
- Department: Sarthe
- Arrondissement: Mamers
- Canton: Mamers
- Commune: Villeneuve-en-Perseigne
- Area^{1}: 6.75 km^{2} (2.61 sq mi)
- Highest elevation: 156 m (512 ft)
- Lowest elevation: 135 m (443 ft)
- Population (2022): 371
  - Density: 55.0/km^{2} (142/sq mi)
- Demonym(s): Ligniérois, Ligniéroise
- Time zone: UTC+01:00 (CET)
  - Summer (DST): UTC+02:00 (CEST)
- Postal code: 72610
- ^{1} French Land Register data, which excludes lakes, ponds, glaciers > 1 km^{2} (0.386 sq mi or 247 acres) and river estuaries.

Lignières-la-Carelle (French pronunciation: [liɲjɛʁ la kaʁɛl]) is a former commune in the Sarthe department in the region of Pays de la Loire in north-western France. In 2015 it became part of Villeneuve-en-Perseigne, of which it is a delegated commune. Its population was 371 in 2022. As of 2012, there were 162 dwellings in the commune, of which 151 main residences.

== See also ==
- Communes of the Sarthe department
