= Hiroko Kasahara =

Japanese voice actress

- 笠原 弘子
- Born: February 19, 1970 (age 56); Niigata Prefecture, Japan
- Occupations: Voice actress, singer, stage actress
- Years active: 1983—present
- Agent: Ogipro The Next
- Height: 155 cm (5 ft 1 in)

Hiroko Kasahara (笠原 弘子, Kasahara Hiroko; born February 19, 1970) is a Japanese voice actress, J-pop singer and stage actress. She sang the ending theme song of the PlayStation 2 role-playing video game Shadow Hearts, titled Ending Theme ~ Shadow Hearts, and the ending theme of the PC and PlayStation 2 visual novel Ever 17: The Out of Infinity, titled Aqua Stripe.

== Filmography ==
=== Television animation ===
- Katue Pearson in Ginga Hyōryū Vifam (1983)
- Coco in Anpanman (1988)
- Princess Camille in Little Nemo: Adventures in Slumberland (1989)
- Mint in Magical Angel Sweet Mint (1990)
- Nanako Misonou in Oniisama e (1991)
- Fuu Hououji in Magic Knight Rayearth (1994)
- Hazuki Kōyama in Full Moon o Sagashite (2002)

=== Non-TV works ===
- Oniyuri Kageyama in Hyakko
- Sayo Amakusa / Magdalia in Rurouni Kenshin
- Azalyn in Irresponsible Captain Tylor
- Naomi Armitage in Armitage III (original)
- Ishtar in The Super Dimension Fortress Macross II: Lovers, Again
- Laura Sullivan in Dancouga – God Bless Dancouga
- Chris Parton in Burning Rangers
- Hitomi Kasahara in Shinesman
- Sunako's Mother in The Wallflower
- Arieta Lyuis in Growlanser II: The Sense of Justice
- Sora Akanegasaki in Ever17 -the out of infinity-
- Phorni in Symphonic Rain
- Jessica in Kurau Phantom Memory
- Princess Rose in Yu-Gi-Oh! Duel Monsters GX
- Koudelka Iasant in Shadow Hearts
- Sakura Tomoe in Weiss Kreuz
- Ami in DNA²
- Retsu Unohana in Rock Musical BLEACH
- Kachua Pearson in Vifam (her first voice acting role, at age 13)
- Senri's Mother in Vampire Knight
- Sango Otojima in Kyūkyoku Chōjin R
- Princess Mariel in Yami to Bōshi to Hon no Tabibito
- Maron Namikaze in Assemble Insert
