= Kaori Utatsuki =

Kaori Utatsuki 詩月 カオリ
- Born: September 6
- Genres: J-pop, Trance, Techno
- Occupations: Singer, songwriter
- Years active: 2001–present
- Labels: Geneon Universal Entertainment; Felis
- Formerly of: I've Sound; Love Planet Five
- Website: geneon-ent.co.jp/rondorobe/music/ive/utatsuki/

Kaori Utatsuki (詩月 カオリ, Utatsuki Kaori; born September 6) is a J-pop singer who is signed to Geneon Universal Entertainment. She is a former member of the music production group I've Sound based in Sapporo, Japan. She has performed several songs for eroge together with the other I've Sound members. In August 2007, she released her first maxi single under Geneon Universal Entertainment titled "Shining Stars Bless," which was used as the opening theme for the anime Nanatsuiro Drops.

In 2013, it was announced that Utatsuki will leave I've Sound after the release of her album Going On on March 20, 2013.

== Discography ==
=== Singles ===
| # | Single information | Sales |
|---|---|---|
| 1st | Shining Stars Bless☆: Released: August 1, 2007; Oricon top 200 position: #23; Theme song from: Nanatsuiro Drops | 10,707 |
| 2nd | Chasse: Released: November 21, 2007; Oricon top 200 position: #30; Theme song from: Hayate no Gotoku! | 6,690 |
| 3rd | end of refrain ~Chiisana Hajimari~: Released: July 29, 2009; Oricon top 200 position: #179 | 339 |
| 4th | Toki no Tsubasa: Released: December 29, 2011; Oricon top 200 position: Did not chart | |
| 5th | A STARRY NIGHT ~Bokura wo Tsunagu Hikari~: Released: August 17, 2015; Oricon top 200 position: Did not chart | |
| 6th | YELLOW CANDY: Released: May 1, 2016; Oricon top 200 position: Did not chart | |
| 7th | Watagashi: Released: October 30, 2016; Oricon top 200 position: Did not chart | |
| 8th | Potential: Released: April 29, 2018; Oricon top 200 position: Did not chart | |

=== Mini-albums ===
| # | Single information | Sales |
|---|---|---|
| 1st | SPYGLASS: Released: August 5, 2009; Oricon top 300 position: #71; From singles: "Shining Stars Bless" and "Chasse" | 2,067 |
| 2nd | GOING ON: Released: March 20, 2013; Oricon top 300 position: #145 | 772 |
| 3rd | Hoshi no Negai: Released: August 19, 2018; Oricon top 300 position: Did not chart | |
| 4th | Birth: Released: January 5, 2019; Oricon top 300 position: Did not chart | |
| 5th | Fate: Released: February 9, 2020; Oricon top 300 position: Did not chart | |

=== Songs in I've ===
==== Solo ====
- Senecio (Stokesia) (released July 25, 2002)
- Sway (released December 28, 2002)
- Kienai Omoi (消えない想い) (released June 20, 2003)
- Kienai Omoi (消えない想い) Album Mix (released November 27, 2003)
- Lemonade (レモネード) (released November 27, 2003)
- Senecio: Album Mix (released November 27, 2003)
- Pure Heart: Sekai de Ichiban Anata ga Suki Remix (Pure Heart: 世界で一番アナタが好き Remix) (released November 27, 2003)
- Do You Know the Magic? (Opening for 魔法はあめいろ?) (released December 3, 2004)
- Cross Talk: Fish Tone Style (released December 29, 2004)
- Anata ga Suki (あなたが好き) (released April 21, 2005)
- Naisho Naisho (ナイショ★Naiしょ) (released August 26, 2005)
- Open (Ending Theme for Tsuyokiss - CoolxSweet) (released August 23, 2006)
- Anata dake no Angel (アナタだけのAngel☆) (Ending Theme for AneImo Second Stage) (released April 27, 2007)
- I'm Home (from Short Circuit II) (released June 22, 2007)
- Jet Smash! (Opening Theme for Ero Smash!) (released July 27, 2007)
- Love Is Money?! (Opening Theme for Shakkin Shimai 2) (released June 27, 2008)
- Change of Heart (Soyuz Project Remix) (released September 24, 2008)
- Shiroi Rinbukyoku (白い輪舞曲) (Ending Theme for Fuyu no Rondo) (released October 31, 2008)
- Soyokaze no Yukue (Front Line Covers ver.) (そよ風の行方) (released December 28, 2008)
- One Small Day (Front Line Covers ver.) (released December 28, 2008)
- Dream to New World (Front Line Covers ver.) (released December 28, 2008)
- End of Refrain: Chiisana Hajimari (End of Refrain: 小さな始まり) (released March 25, 2009)
- Eien, chiisana hikari (永遠～小さな光～) (released February 16, 2011)
- Nijiiro Rock & Roll (★虹色ロックンロール♪) (Opening for つよきす3学期) (released March 31, 2011)
- Face of Fact Tribal Link version (released July 29, 2011)
- The Maze Tribal Link version (released July 29, 2011)
- Hold on Me: koi no mahou (Hold on Me ～恋の魔法～) (Opening for ラブライド・イヴ) (released August 26, 2011)

==== Kotoko & Kaori Utatsuki ====
- Bokura ga Mimamoru Mirai (僕らが見守る未来) (released September 20, 2002)
- Kimi to Yume wo Shinjite (君と夢を信じて) (released June 28, 2002)
- Watashi wa Uta ga Eta (ワタシはウタがヘタ) (released November 29, 2002) (non-I've)
- Watashi wa Uta ga Eta Dakedo (ワタシはウタがヘタだけど) (released November 29, 2002) (non-I've)
- Save Your Heart: Album mix (released September 5, 2003)
- Natsukusa no Senro: Album mix (夏草の線路 Album Mix) (released September 5, 2003)
- Ren'ai Chuu!: Remix (恋愛Chu！Remix) (released November 27, 2003)
- Seishun Rocket: Short Circuit II Edit (↑青春ロケット↑: Short Circuit II Edit) (released June 22, 2007)
- Crash Course: Koi no Tokubetsu Lesson (Crash Course: 恋の特別レッスン) (released December 19, 2008)

==== Albums in I've ====
- Dirty Gift (released December 29, 2002)
- I've Girls Compilation Vol.4 "Lament" (released October 30, 2003)
- I've Girls Compilation Vol.5 "Out Flow" (released October 30, 2003)
- Short Circuit (released November 27, 2003)
- Mixed Up (released December 29, 2004)
- I've Girls Compilation Vol.6 "Collective" (released September 30, 2005)
- Short Circuit II (released June 22, 2007)
- Master Groove Circle (released September 24, 2008)
- The Front Line Covers (released December 28, 2008)
- I've Sound 10th Anniversary Departed to the Future Special CD BOX (released March 25, 2009)

==== I've Special Unit ====
1. "See You" Chiisana Eien (～小さな永遠～, Chīsana Eien) (P.V ver.) (released September 5, 2003)
2. "Fair Heaven" (released July 30, 2005)
3. "Tenjou wo Kakeru Monotachi (天壌を翔る者たち) (performed as Love Planet Five) (released April 4, 2007)
