= Shining Stars Bless =

Single by Kaori Utatsuki
- B-side: "I'm Home: Unplugged"
- Released: August 1, 2007
- Genre: J-pop
- Length: 19:41
- Label: Geneon
- Songwriter(s): Maiko Iuchi, Kotoko
- Producer(s): I've Sound

Kaori Utatsuki singles chronology
"Shining Stars Bless" (2007)	"Chasse" (2007)

"Shining Stars Bless" is the debut single of I've singer Kaori Utatsuki under Geneon Entertainment. It was released on August 1, 2007. The title track was used as the opening theme for the visual novel/anime Nanatsuiro Drops. It reached #23 in the Oricon charts and has sold a total of 5,339 copies in its first week.

== Track listing ==
1. Shining Stars Bless—4:35
  - Composition: Maiko Iuchi
  - Arrangement: Maiko Iuchi
  - Lyrics: Kotoko, Kaori Utatsuki
2. I'm Home: Unplugged—5:17
  - Composition: Kazuya Takase
  - Arrangement: Kazuya Takase
  - Lyrics: Kotoko
3. Shining Stars Bless: Instrumental—4:35
4. I'm Home: Unplugged instrumental—5:14
