= La Fresnaye-sur-Chédouet =

- Part of Villeneuve-en-Perseigne
- Location of La Fresnaye-sur-Chédouet
- Location within France Location within Pays de la Loire
- Coordinates: 48°26′55″N 0°15′15″E
- Country: France
- Region: Pays de la Loire
- Department: Sarthe
- Arrondissement: Mamers
- Canton: Mamers
- Commune: Villeneuve-en-Perseigne
- Area^{1}: 31.41 km^{2} (12.13 sq mi)
- Highest elevation: 296 m (971 ft)
- Lowest elevation: 135 m (443 ft)
- Population (2022): 930
  - Density: 30/km^{2} (77/sq mi)
- Demonym: Fresnayons
- Time zone: UTC+01:00 (CET)
  - Summer (DST): UTC+02:00 (CEST)
- Postal code: 72600
- ^{1} French Land Register data, which excludes lakes, ponds, glaciers > 1 km^{2} (0.386 sq mi or 247 acres) and river estuaries.

La Fresnaye-sur-Chédouet (French pronunciation: [la fʁɛnɛ syʁ ʃedwɛ]) is a former commune in the Sarthe department in the region of Pays de la Loire in north-western France. In 2015 it became part of Villeneuve-en-Perseigne.

== See also ==
- Communes of the Sarthe department
- Parc naturel régional Normandie-Maine
