= Durieux =

Durieux is a surname. Notable people with the surname include:

- Tilla Durieux (1880–1971), Austrian actress
- Frédéric Durieux (born 1959), French composer
- Bruno Durieux (born 1944), French politician
- Caroline Durieux (1886–1989), American lithographer
