= Villeneuve-en-Perseigne =

- Commune
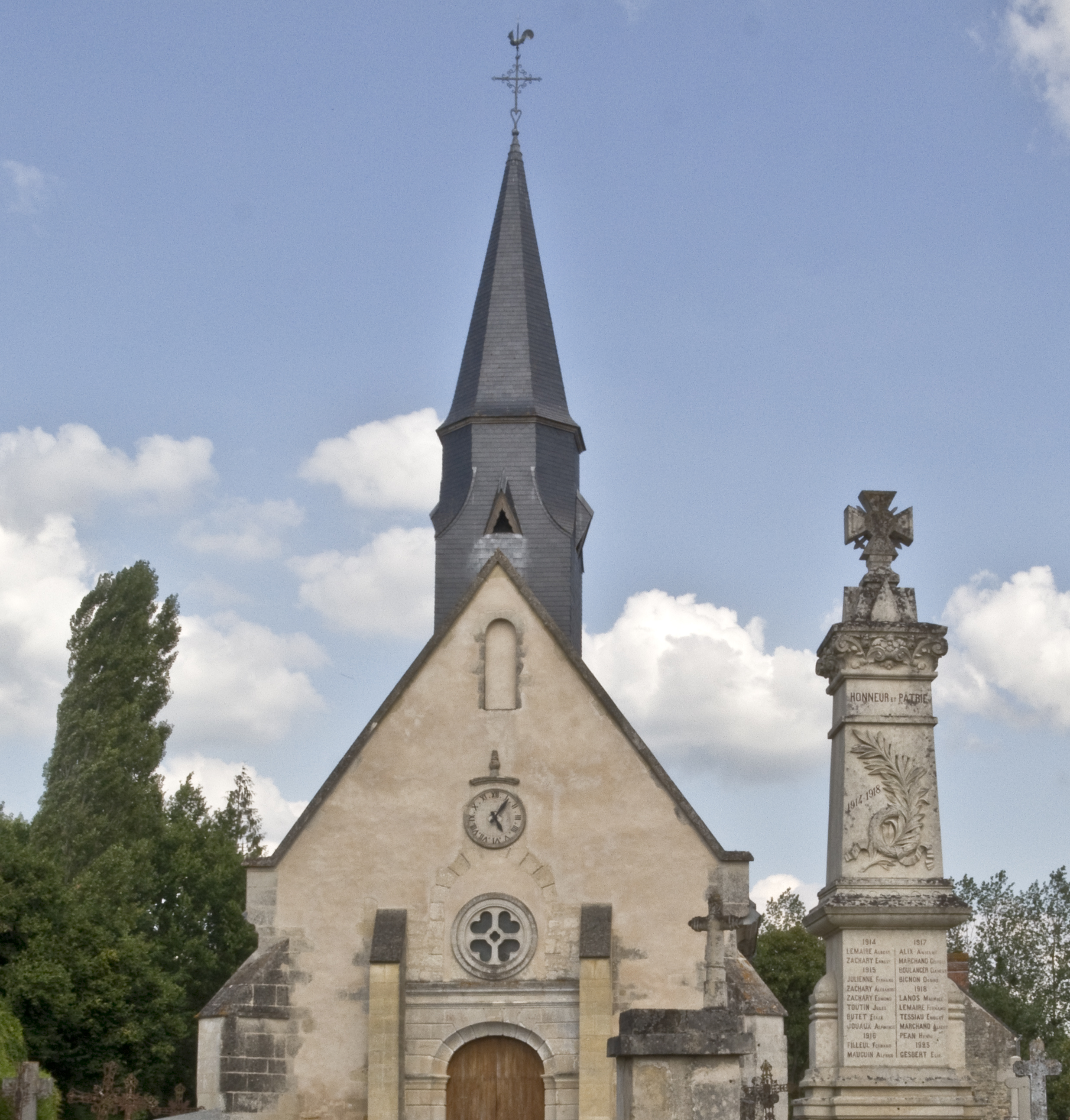
- The church of la Trinité, in Roullée
- Location of Villeneuve-en-Perseigne
- Location within France Location within Pays de la Loire
- Coordinates: 48°26′52″N 0°15′12″E
- Country: France
- Region: Pays de la Loire
- Department: Sarthe
- Arrondissement: Mamers
- Canton: Mamers
- Intercommunality: CU Alençon

Government
  - Mayor (2020–2026): André Trottet
- Area^{1}: 86.70 km^{2} (33.48 sq mi)
- Highest elevation: 296 m (971 ft)
- Lowest elevation: 133 m (436 ft)
- Population (2023): 2,174
  - Density: 25.07/km^{2} (64.94/sq mi)
- Time zone: UTC+01:00 (CET)
  - Summer (DST): UTC+02:00 (CEST)
- INSEE/Postal code: 72137 /72600
- ^{1} French Land Register data, which excludes lakes, ponds, glaciers > 1 km^{2} (0.386 sq mi or 247 acres) and river estuaries.

Villeneuve-en-Perseigne (French pronunciation: [vilnœv ɑ̃ pɛʁsɛɲ]) is a commune in the Sarthe department in the Pays de la Loire region in north-western France. It was formed on 1 January 2015 by the merger of the former communes La Fresnaye-sur-Chédouet, Chassé, Lignières-la-Carelle, Montigny, Roullée and Saint-Rigomer-des-Bois.

== Geography ==
The commune is made up of the following collection of villages and hamlets, Roullée, La Foucherie, Ventes du Four, Montigny, Chassé, Lignières-la-Carelle, Le Goulet and La Fresnaye-sur-Chédouet.

The commune is in the Normandie-Maine Regional Natural Park.

Two rivers, the Sarthe and the la Pervenche, flow through the commune.

The commune along with another 32 communes is part of a 3,503 hectare, Natura 2000 conservation area, called the Haute vallée de la Sarthe.

== Population ==
Population data refer to the area corresponding with the commune as of January 2025.

Historical population
Year	Pop.	±% p.a.
1968	1,760	—
1975	1,671	−0.74%
1982	1,839	+1.38%
1990	1,927	+0.59%
1999	2,090	+0.91%
2007	2,175	+0.50%
2012	2,235	+0.55%
2017	2,196	−0.35%
2023	2,174	−0.17%
Source: INSEE

== Points of Interest ==
- L'étang du Chédouet a 7 hectare lake within a 10 hectare site. The lake is part of the Natura 2000 site. Bocage à Osmoderma eremita au nord de la forêt de Perseigne and features sign posted walks.
- La Ferme du Cheval d'Ô is a Children's farm and rescue homing center for animal that is open to the public. It was opened in 2025.

=== Museums ===
- Musée du vélo "La Belle Echappée" - a museum dedicated to the history of cycling and the Tour de France from 1890 to the present day. It has been open to the public since the year 2000.

=== National Heritage sites ===
The Commune has a total of 2 buildings and areas listed as a Monument historique:

- Château de Courtilloles - an eighteenth century chateau that was listed as a monument historique in 2021.
- Château de Montigny - an eighteenth century chateau that was listed as a monument historique in 2021.

== See also ==
- Communes of the Sarthe department
