= Jaja Uma Grooming Up! =

Japanese manga series by Masami Yuki

- First tankōbon volume cover

じゃじゃ馬グルーミン★UP! (Jaja Uma Gurūmin Appu!)
- Manga
- Written by: Masami Yuki
- Published by: Shogakukan
- Imprint: Shōnen Sunday Comics
- Magazine: Weekly Shōnen Sunday
- Original run: October 19, 1994 – September 27, 2000
- Volumes: 26

Jaja Uma Grooming Up! (じゃじゃ馬グルーミン★UP!, Jaja Uma Gurūmin Appu!; "Unruly Horse Grooming Improvement") is a Japanese manga series written and illustrated by Masami Yuki. It was serialized in Shogakukan's Weekly Shōnen Sunday from October 1994 to September 2000, and compiled into 26 tankōbon volumes.

== Plot ==
Jaja Uma Grooming Up! depicts the story of Shunpei Kuze, a high-school student unsure of the future until he takes a motorcycle ride to Hokkaidō. When his motorbike runs out of fuel, Shunpei is stranded on a country road; to make matters worse, he loses his wallet. He is found and taken in by the daughter of a local rancher named Hibiki Watarai. Shunpei begins a new life on the Watarai horse-breeding ranch, learning about the horses and the ranch's lively family and workers.

== Publication ==
Jaja Uma Grooming Up! is written and illustrated by Masami Yuki. The series started its serialization in Shogakukan's Weekly Shōnen Sunday on October 19, 1994, and finished on September 27, 2000. Shogakukan compiled the series into twenty-six individual tankōbon volumes, which were published between March 18, 1995, and November 18, 2000. Shogakukan re-released the series into a 14-volume bunkoban edition from December 13, 2003, to December 15, 2004.
