= Chesse =

Chesse, Chessé or De Chesse is a surname. Notable people with the surname include:

- Henri Isidore Chessé (1839–1912), French colonial governor of Tahiti (1880–1881)
- Jean-Pierre Chessé, a knight of the French Order of Agricultural Merit
- Joanna Chesse, winner of the 2012 Indoor Archery World Cup in the women's recurve bow event
- Laurent De Chesse, bronze medalist in the 2016 IPSC French Shotgun Championship
- Matt Chessé (born 1965), American film editor, producer, and director
- Ralph Chessé (1900–1991), American painter, actor, puppeteer, and one of the artists of the Coit Tower murals

== See also ==
- An archaic spelling of chess
  - The Game and Playe of the Chesse, a 1476 book by William Caxton
- Chasse (disambiguation)
- Cheese, a food
