= Assemble Insert =

Japanese manga series

- The 2005 American DVD release.

アッセンブル・インサート (Assenburu Insāto)
- Manga
- Written by: Masami Yuki
- Published by: Out Comics
- Magazine: Aniparo Comics
- Published: 1985
- Volumes: 2
- Original video animation
- Directed by: Ami Tomobuki
- Produced by: Maki Tarō; Toyomi Akimoto
- Written by: Michiru Shimada
- Music by: Kohei Tanaka; Kyōko Matsumiya
- Studio: Studio Core; Tohokushinsha Film
- Licensed by: NA: Right Stuf Inc.
- Released: December 21, 1989 – February 20, 1990
- Runtime: 60 minutes
- Episodes: 2

Assemble Insert (アッセンブル・インサート, Assenburu Insāto) is a 1985 manga series by Masami Yuki (best known for his manga and anime series Mobile Police Patlabor). The main character is a young would-be idol singer and high school student, Maron Namikaze, who has superhuman strength. She battles a mecha organization, Demon Seed, which has been terrorizing Tokyo. The manga was adapted into a 2 episode anime OVA in 1989. The series is a parody of Japanese pop culture.

Three CDs were released: a single on September 20, 1989, an image soundtrack on October 25, 1989, and a concert CD on March 5, 1990.

== Plot ==
In near-future Tokyo, a group called the Demon Seed has been antagonizing the city with its thefts and giant robotic Power Suits. After various failed attempts against the Demon Seed, the Special Operations Anti-Demon Seed Team (five men in a downtown office) begins to look for an idol to pilot a robotic suit against the Demon Seed. A talent show is held; and after a particularly dull line-up of contestants, the extremely strong Maron Namikaze is discovered. She is fitted with a metal costume and sent to take the Demon Seed down, all the while having an idol singer career forced upon her.

== Characters ==
- Maron Namikaze: The 13-year-old protagonist. She is very timid and nervous, but has been gifted with immense natural strength. Maron is trained to become a J-Pop idol and becomes popular enough to be entered for the Newcomer's Award in the music awards. For the American DVD release, Maron was claimed to be a high school senior, even in the subtitles. Voiced by: Hiroko Kasahara (Japanese); Jessica Calvello (English).
- Chief Hattori: The leader of the Special Operations team, later Maron's manager and coach. He wrote and submitted the Idol Project plans when he was drunk, and later to his chagrin, it was approved. Hattori was slightly modelled after Masami Yuki's editor at the time. Voiced by: Norio Wakamoto (Japanese); J. David Brimmer (English).
- Dr. Ryouhei Shimokobe: The dwarf-sized researcher whom created Maron's costume. Before he knew the idol was a girl, he created a Patlabor-esque robot, which he later gave to the Demon Seed. He is very arrogant and proud of his work, soon becoming disgusted when Maron is converted into a singer instead of a fighter. Voiced by: Ichiro Nagai (Japanese); Christopher William (English).
- Professor Kyozaburo Demon: The leader of the Demon Seed. Very confident with his work, he believes the group can spend as much money as they want, thinking they can get more at any time. However, he runs out of money to fix the Power Suits after Maron's first interference, and takes the Demon Seed into hiding for a few months. Voiced by: Chikao Ohtsuka (Japanese); Christopher William (English).
- Kagiri Sonoba: An idol singer known for her provocative costumes. She gets into a one-sided rivalry with Maron after both girls turn out to be competing for the Newcomer's Award. Voiced by: Maria Kawamura (Japanese); Mandy Bonhomme (English).

== Music ==
The opening theme, "Assemble Insert" (アッセンブル・インサート, Assenburu Insāto), had lyrics by and was composed by Kyōko Matsumiya, was arranged by Kohei Tanaka, and had vocals by Hiroko Kasahara, the voice actor for Maron. The first ending theme, "That Guy" (あいつ, Aitsu), had lyrics and vocals by Kasahara, was composed by Matsumiya, and was arranged by Tanaka. The second ending theme, "Flax-colored Dream Jar" (あま色の夢のつぼ, Amairo no Yume no Tsubo), had lyrics by and was composed by Matsumiyam was arranged by Tanaka, and had vocals by Kasahara.

There were four insert songs:

- "Sirocco Soaring Girl" (熱風翔女, Neppū Shōjo): Lyrics and composition by Matsumiya, arrangement by Tanaka, vocals by Kasahara
- "The Love Gang" (恋のギャングたち, Koi no Gyangu-tachi): Lyrics by Yoshiko Oga, composition and arrangement by Tanaka, vocals by Maria Kawamura
- "Excellent Change! Ultimate Sentai Kōgaman" (エクセレント・チェンジ!究極戦隊コウガマン, Ekuserento Chenji! Kyūkyaku Sentai Kōgaman): Lyrics, composition, and vocals by Masayuki Yamamoto, arrangement by Tanaka
- "Love & Power": Lyrics and composition by Matsumiya, arrangement by Tanaka, vocals by Kasahara

=== Album releases ===
Three albums were released through Warner Bros. Japan:

- A theme song single titled Assemble Insert (アッセンブル・インサート, Assenburu Insāto) was released on September 25, 1989, on cassette tape and as a CD single.
- The Assemble Insert Image Soundtrack (アッセンブル・インサート イメージ・サウンドトラック, Assenburu Insāto Imēji Saundotorakku) was released on October 25, 1989.
- The third album, Assemble Concert (アッセンブル・コンサート, Assenburu Konsāto), was released on March 25, 1990.

== Reception ==
Helen McCarthy in 500 Essential Anime Movies stated that the OVA "remains an enjoyable bit of nonsense, with some of the biggest names on the anime scene on the crew list."
