= Norio Wakamoto =

Japanese voice actor (born 1945)

- 若本 規夫
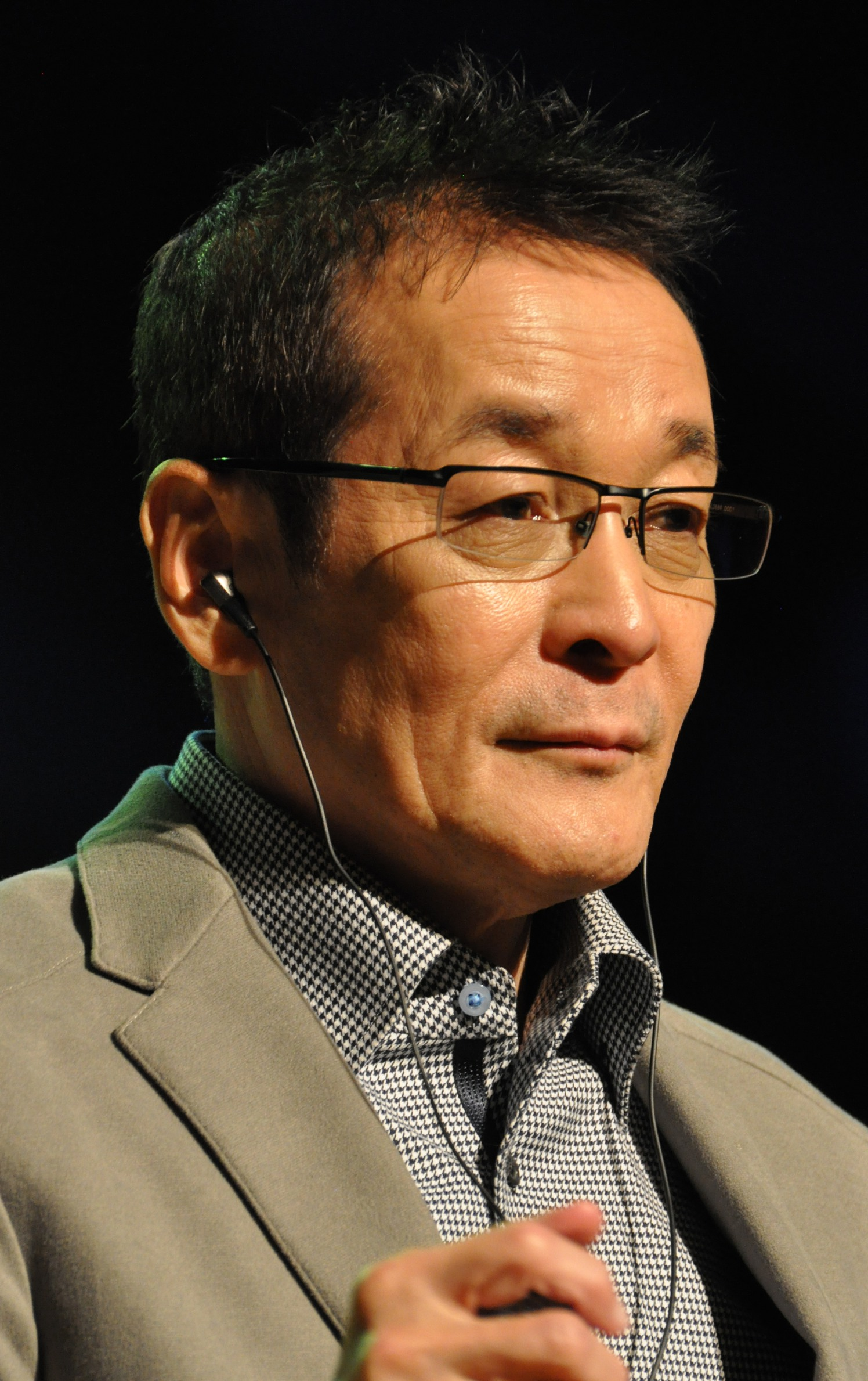
- Wakamoto at Desucon Frostbite in Lahti, Finland in 2013
- Born: Noriaki Wakamoto; October 18, 1945 (age 81); Shimonoseki, Japan
- Education: Waseda University
- Occupation: Voice actor
- Years active: 1972–present
- Agent: Sigma Seven

Norio Wakamoto (若本 規夫, Wakamoto Norio; born October 18, 1945) is a Japanese voice actor affiliated with the Sigma Seven talent agency. He was born in Shimonoseki, Yamaguchi Prefecture, and was raised in Sakai, Osaka Prefecture. He graduated from Waseda University.

On adult works, like OVAs or dating sims, he goes by the alias Kyōnosuke Hiruma (比留間 京之介, Hiruma Kyōnosuke).

== Biography ==
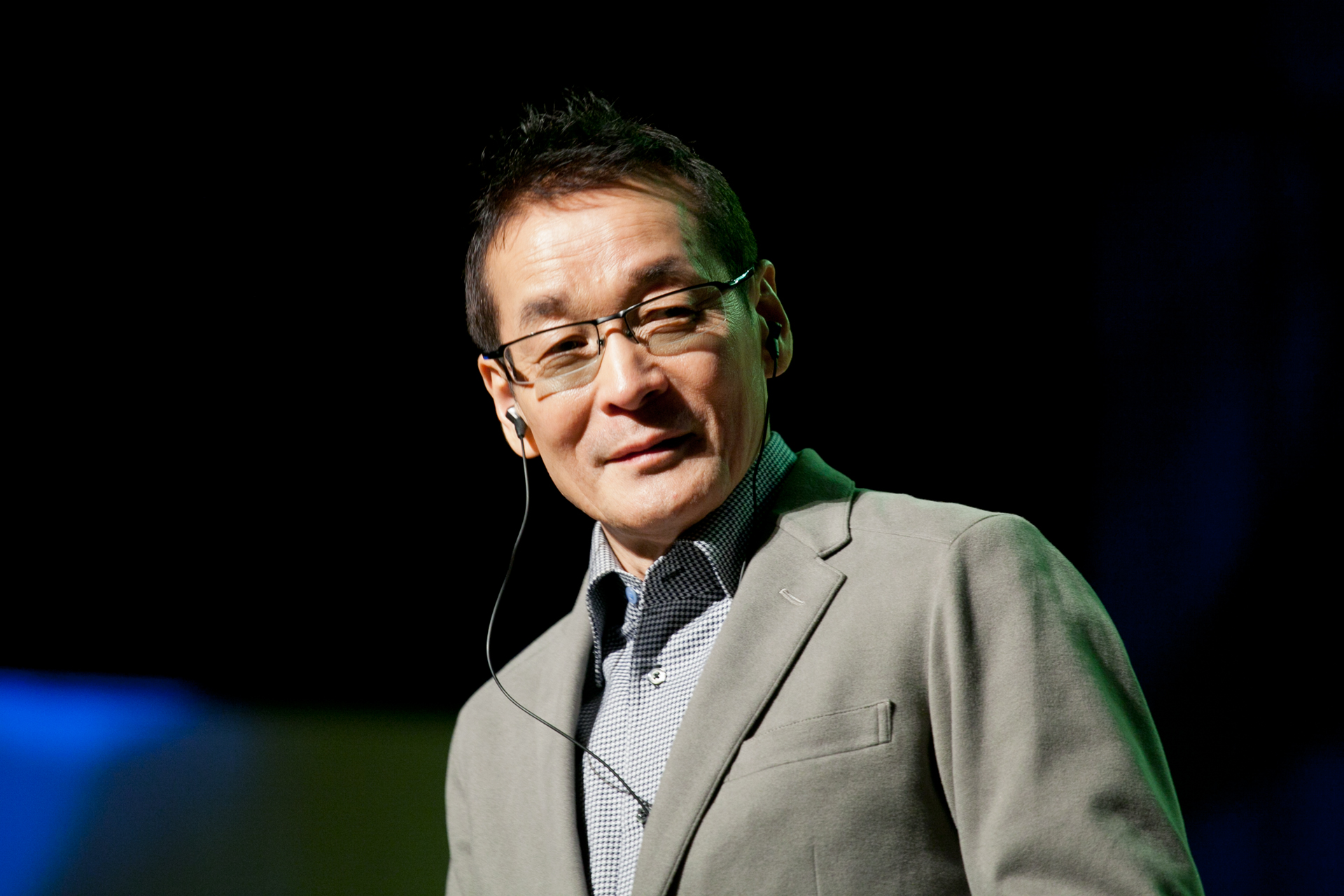
Norio Wakamoto at Desucon Frostbite 2013, Finland

Wakamoto studied in Waseda University under the Faculty of Law. During his time there, he participated in Shorin Kempo activities.

Wakamoto entered the Nakano Police Academy, intending to become a police officer. He sought advice from a career counselor after his professor did not agree with his plans to do graduate studies. He was later assigned to his first post at the Kuramae Police Station. Later on, he was assigned to be in an anti-riot unit and was deployed to arrest rioters participating the Shinjuku riot in 1968. Wakamoto became disillusioned with his duties and decided to leave.

Wakamoto joined the Consumers Union of Japan after leaving the force. But he got into trouble at times as he did his work without getting approval from his superiors.

According to Wakamoto, he decided to do voice work, starting from dubbing foreign movies, when he saw an ad calling for applications to Ryo Kurosawa's training school after he left the union due to a fight with his boss while drunk. Tohokushinsha's dubbing director, Kanji Nakano, encouraged him to go into voice acting despite uncertainties if he would be able to get potential work as a voice actor.

== Filmography ==
=== Anime ===
Year	Series	Role	Notes	Source
1977	Glacier Warrior Gaislugger	Onoriki		
1979	Rose of Versailles	Count		
1980	Ashita no Joe 2	Kim Yong-bi		
1983	Aura Battler Dunbine	Narrator		
1984	Fist of the North Star	Raoh, Shuren of the Flames	Only voices Raoh in Episode 32	
1985	Dancouga - Super Beast Machine God	Shapiro Keats		
1986–1988	Maison Ikkoku	Master		
1986	Violence Jack: Harem Bomber	Halem Bomber		
1986	Amon Saga	Denon		
1986	Windaria	Kyle		
1987	Black Magic M-66	Roger		
1988	Tatakae!! Ramenman	Kinnikuken Banboro		
1988	Appleseed	A.J. Sebastian		
1988	Virgin Fleet	Wakamoto		
1988	Yoroiden Samurai Troopers	Kaosu		
1988	Gunbuster	Koichiro "Coach" Ota		
1988	Oishinbo	Seiichi Okaboshi		
1988	Armor Hunter Mellowlink	Sergeant Gorufi		
1988	Legend of the Galactic Heroes	Oskar von Reuenthal		
1989	Goku Midnight Eye	Hakuryuu Genji		
1989	Legend of Heavenly Sphere Shurato	Shiva		
1989	Shin Bikkuriman	Black Zeus		
1989	Assemble Insert	Hattori		
1989	Guyver	Oswald A. Lisker		
1990	AD Police	Billy Fanword	Ep. 3	
1990	Cyber City Oedo 808	Juzo Hasegawa		
1990	Record of Lodoss War	Woodchuck, Woodkarla	OVA	
1990	Karasu Tengu Kabuto	Fuuma Kotaro		
1991	Burn Up!	McCoy		
1991	Madara	Miroku		
1991	RG Veda	Taishakuten		
1991	Guardian of Darkness	Susanoo	Ep. 2	
1991	Detonator Orgun	Tomoru's brother, Simmons		
1991	Ninja Ryuukenden	Robert		
1991	Tobe! Kurija no Peek	Father		
1992	Tekkaman Blade	Tekkaman Omega, Kengo Aiba		
1992	Sailor Moon	Yusuke Amade	Ep. 6	
1992	Dragon Ball Z	Cell		
1992	Giant Robo	Taisou		
1992	Ushio and Tora	Hyou		
1992	Tenchi Muyo Ryo-Ohki	Kagato		
1992	Yu Yu Hakusho	Gouki, Chuu		
1992	Ys II: Castle in the Heavens	Darm		
1993	Miracle Girls	Mr. X		
1993–1994	Kishin Corps	Matoi Shinkai		
1994	Akazukin Chacha	Gekko	Ep. 46	
1994	Plastic Little	Balboa		
1994	801 T.T.S. Airbats	Konishi Mitsuru		
1994	Macross Plus	Dr. Worth		
1994	Yagami-kun no Katei no Jijō	Yōji Yagami		
1995	Tenchi Universe	Kagato		
1995	Wedding Peach	Masahiro Tamano		
1995	Slayers The Motion Picture	Lagos		
1997	Slayers Great	Lord Granion		
1997	Berserk	Gambino		
1998	Trigun	Gofsef		
1998	Cowboy Bebop	Vicious		
1998	Weiß Kreuz	Reiji Takatori		
1998	Master Keaton	Herman	Ep. 20	
1998	Steam Detectives	Machine Baron		
1998	Eat-Man '98	DoMarc		
1998	YAT Anshin! Uchuu Ryokou 2	Ganon		
1999	Legend of Himiko	Amatama master, Jakatsu		
1999	Angel Links	Lawrence McGuire		
1999	Infinite Ryvius	Conrad Visukesu		
2000	Mezzo Forte	Hirooka		
2001	JoJo's Bizarre Adventure	Hol Horse		
2001–2015	Uta no Prince-sama	Shining Saotome		
2001	s-CRY-ed	Narrator		
2001	Hellsing	Richard Hellsing	TV series	
2001	Cyborg 009	Scarl		
2002	Heat Guy J	Serge Echigo		
2002	Azumanga Daioh	Chiyo-Father		
2002–2003	Kiddy Grade	Chevalier D'Autriche		
2002	Duel Masters	Jōji		
2002	Digimon Frontier	IceDevimon		
2002	Daigunder	Dragoburst	TV series	
2002	Space Pirate Captain Herlock: The Endless Odyssey	Irita		
2003	Wolf's Rain	Owl, Darcia		
2003	Zatch Bell!	Victoream		
2003	Ninja Scroll: The Series	Kitsunebi	TV series	
2003	Cromartie High School	Shinichi Mechazawa		
2003	The Wicked and the Damned: A Hundred Tales of Karma	Tokuemon		
2003	Planetes	Gigart		
2003	F-Zero GP Legend	Black Shadow		
2004	Gokusen	Ohshima		
2004	Sgt. Frog	Shurara		
2004	Samurai Champloo	Bundai		
2004	Ninja Nonsense	Onsokumaru		
2004	Desert Punk	Rain Spider		
2005	Ah! My Goddess	Senbee		
2005	Transformers: Cybertron	Flame Convoy		
2005	Basilisk: The Kouga Ninja Scrolls	Yagyū Munenori		
2006–2018	Gintama	Katakuriko Matsudaira		
2006–2017	Fairy Tail	Celestial Spirit King		
2006	Hellsing Ultimate	Father Alexander Anderson		
2006	Yoshinaga-san Chi no Gargoyle	Gargoyle		
2006	Ah! My Goddess: Flights of Fancy	Senbee		
2006	Inukami!	Sekidousai		
2006	Parappa The Rapper	King Kong Mushi (Ep. 29)		
2006	D.Gray-man	Winters Sokaro		
2006	Code Geass	Charles zi Britannia		
2006	Ghost Slayers Ayashi	Torī Yōzō		
2007	Hayate the Combat Butler	Voice of the Heavens (Narrator)		
2007	Oh! Edo Rocket	Yozo Torii		
2007	Baccano!	Gustave St. Germain		
2007	Yawaraka Sangokushi Tsukisase!! Ryofuko-chan	Kou Jun		
2008	Tetsuwan Birdy: Decode	Skeletso		
2008	Antique Bakery	Tadahiro Akutagawa		
2009	Sengoku Basara	Oda Nobunaga		
2009–2010	Kiddy Girl-and	Shuu		
2010–2011	Dragon Ball Z Kai	Cell		
2011–2012	Dog Days	Godwin Dorure		
2011	Dororon Enma-kun MeeraMera	Enma Daiō		
2011	Future Diary	Deus Ex Machina		
2013	Blood Lad	Wolf Daddy		
2014	Wizard Barristers	Nana Genie		
2015	Dog Days	Godwin Dorure		
2016	Ushio to Tora	Guren		
	Case Closed	Police Inspector Gorō Ōtaki, others		
	Chounoukyuu Garaga	Alf		
	Sasuga no Sarutobi	Ogata Sensei		
	Sazae-san	Anago, others		
	Wizardry OVA	Randy		
	Dog Soldier	Makoto Allen Takemura		
	Joker	Narration		
	Kinnikuman II Sei	Blood Killer		
	Le Deus	Kairi		
	Makai Tenshō	Araki Mataemon		
2018	Pop Team Epic	Pipimi (episode 3, second half)		
	Dances with the Dragons	Viscount Amupura	First appearance before end credits of Episode 6	
2021	Kageki Shojo!!	Captain Anai		
2021	Muv-Luv Alternative	Paul Radhabinod		
2025	Guilty Gear Strive: Dual Rulers	Johnny		

=== Film ===
Year	Series	Role	Notes	Source
1981	Mobile Suit Gundam	Gene		
1989	The Five Star Stories	Vord Bewlard		
1991	Mobile Suit Gundam F91	Lt. Bardo		
1993	Ninja Scroll	Utsutsu Mujuurou		
2001	Metropolis	Pero		
2013	Bayonetta: Bloody Fate	Balder		
2022	Dragon Ball Super: Super Hero	Cell Max		
2025	Virgin Punk: Clockwork Girl	Tommy J		

=== Drama CDs ===
Series	Role	Notes	Source
Aa Megami-sama: Tokuten Ou	Senbee		
Aozora Shoujotai	Konishi Mitsuru		
Aozora Shoujotai Saraba Shimo Ranger	Narrator		
Den'ei Shoujo Video Girl Ai	Mysterious Man		
Dog Days	Godwin Dorure		
Ganbaru Sentai Mare Ranger		niconico	
Hatoful Boyfriend	Okosan		
JoJo's Bizarre Adventure	Dio Brando		
RG Veda	Taishakuten		
Vampire Hunter	Narration	Cassette	

=== Live-action television narration ===
Series	Channel	Notes	Source
Arashi ni shiyagare (ja:嵐にしやがれ)	NTV	variety show	
Tōkōtokuhōōkoku (ja:投稿!特ホウ王国)	NTV		
Nanda kimi wa! ? TV (なんだ君は! ? TV, What are you! ? TV)	TBS		
Hitoshi Matsumoto no suberanai hanashi (ja:人志松本のすべらない話)	CX	Variety show	
Downtown no Gottsu Ee Kanji	CX	Variety show	
The Nonfiction (ja:ザ・ノンフィクション)	CX		
(ja:近未来×予測テレビ ジキル&ハイド)	EX		
Super J Channel (ja:スーパーJチャンネル)	EX		
(ja:真相究明!噂のファイル)	EX		
(ja:実録世界のミステリー)	TX		
(ja:商品降臨)	TX		
Saturday Theater (サタデーシアター)	BS朝日		
Journey of ANA (全日空の旅)	BS-TBS		
Hikari TV presents bimyo 〜na tobira AKB 48 no gachichare (ja:びみょ〜な扉 AKB48のガチチャレ)	Hikari TV Channel		

=== Video games ===
Year	Series	Role	Notes	Source
1991	Cyber City Oedo 808 Kemono no Zokusei	Dekachu	PC Engine	
1992	Maho no Shojo Silky Lip	Ohtake Dome	Megadrive	
1992	Detonator Orgun	Lang	Mega CD	
1992	Quiz no Hoshi		PC Engine	
1993	Tenshi no Uta 2 Datenshi no Sentaku	Lanzo	PC Engine	
1995	Dragon Ball Z Ultimate Battle 22	Cell	PlayStation	
1995	O-chan no Oekaki Logic	Sukezaemon	PlayStation	
1995	Kishin Douji Zenki FX: Vajura Fight	Marubasu	PC-FX	
1996	PopoloCrois Monogatari II	Kimendouji, Jumbo	PlayStation	
1996	Last Bronx	Toru Kurosawa	Arcade, Sega Saturn, Windows	
1997	Eve Burst Error	Ross Midou	Sega Saturn	
1997	Marica -Shinjitsu no Sekai- (ja:マリカ 〜真実の世界〜)	Ronald	Sega Saturn	
1997	Castlevania: Symphony of the Night	Dracula	PlayStation, Sega Saturn, Xbox 360	
1998	Gunbird 2	Aine	Arcade	
1998	Super Adventure Rockman	Ra Moon, Narrator	PlayStation, Sega Saturn	
1998	Neon Genesis Evangelion – Eva and Good Friends The Stripping Project!	Ohta	PlayStation	
1998	U.P.P.	Buoh	PlayStation	
1998	MediEvil	Lord Zarok	PlayStation	
1999	Eretzvaju	Default "Male Narrator" voice	PlayStation	
1999	Little Princess: Marl Ōkoku no Ningyō Hime 2	Fon Fon	PlayStation	
2000	Patlabor -Game Edition-	Kurishuna	PlayStation	
2000	Eternal Arcadia	Gilder	Dreamcast	
2000	The Bouncer	Dauragon C. Mikado	PlayStation 2	
2001	Capcom vs. SNK 2 EO	M. Bison (Vega)	GameCube, PlayStation 2, Xbox	
2001	The King of Fighters 2001	Igniz	Neo-Geo, PlayStation 2	
2001	Mega Man X6	High Max	PlayStation	
2002	The King of Fighters 2002	Omega Rugal	Neo Geo, PlayStation 2	
2002	Guilty Gear X2	Johnny	Arcade, PlayStation 2	
2002	Tales of Destiny 2	Barbatos Goetia	PlayStation 2, PlayStation Portable	
2002	Innocent Tears	Yohanesu Kamiizumi	Xbox	
2002	PoPoLoCrois: Hajimari no Bouken	Yazm	PlayStation 2	
2003	Bujingai	Naguri Tensai	PlayStation 2	
2004	Kishin Houkou Demonbane	Augustus	PlayStation 2	
2004	Quiz Magic Academy 2	Garuuda-sensei	PlayStation	
2005	Wild Arms 4	Gawn Brawdia	PlayStation 2	
2005	Quiz Magic Academy 3	Garuuda	Arcade	
2005	Sharin no Kuni, Himawari no Shoujo	Houzuki Masaomi	Visual Novel	
2005	Kingdom Hearts II	Xemnas	PlayStation 2	
2006	Final Fantasy XII	Al-Cid Margrace	PlayStation 2, PlayStation 4, PC, Nintendo Switch, Xbox One	
2006	Kishin Hishou Demonbane	Augustus	PC	
2006	Soul Link Extension		PlayStation 2	
2006	Super Dragon Ball Z	Cell	PlayStation 2	
2006	Castlevania: Portrait of Ruin	Dracula	Nintendo DS	
2006	Guilty Gear XX Accent Core	Johnny	PlayStation 2	
2007	Luminous Arc	Andre	Nintendo DS	
2007	Super Robot Taisen OG Original Generations	Shuterun	PlayStation 2	
2007	Sengoku Basara 2	Oda Nobunaga	Wii	
2007	Castlevania: The Dracula X Chronicles	Dracula	PlayStation Portable	
2007	Final Fantasy IV	Rubicante	Nintendo DS	
2007	Star Ocean: First Departure	Ashlay Bernbeldt	PlayStation Portable	
2008	Coded Soul: Uketsugareshi Idea	Meme	PlayStation Portable	
2008–2014	Street Fighter IV series	M. Bison (Vega)	Android, Arcade, PlayStation 3, PlayStation 4, Xbox 360, Nintendo 3DS, iOS, Windows	
2008	Soulcalibur IV	Yoshimitsu	PlayStation, Xbox 360	
2008	Castlevania: Order of Ecclesia	Dracula	Nintendo DS	
2008	GetAmped2	Daigokuin Raizo	PC	
2008–2010	Higurashi no Naku Koro ni Kizuna series	Yamaoki Kaoru	Nintendo DS	
2008	Dissidia: Final Fantasy	Chaos	PSP, PS Vita	
2009	The King of Fighters 2002: Unlimited Match	Igniz	PlayStation 2, Xbox Live	
2009	Kingdom Hearts 358/2 Days	Xemnas	Nintendo DS	
2009	Himitsu Sentai Metamor V	Daimonji	PlayStation	
2010	Fist of the North Star: Ken's Rage	Narrator	PlayStation 3, Xbox 360	
2010	Splinter Cell: Conviction	Victor Coste	Xbox 360 (Japanese dub)	
2010	Xenoblade Chronicles	Mumkhar	Wii	
2009	Soulcalibur: Broken Destiny	Yoshimitsu	PSP	
2011	Catherine	Thomas Mutton (Dumuzid)	PlayStation 3, PlayStation 4, PlayStation Vita, Xbox 360	
2011	Dissidia 012 Final Fantasy	Chaos	PSP	
2011	Super Robot Taisen F Kanketsuhen		PlayStation	
2012	Soulcalibur V	Yoshimitsu II	PlayStation, Xbox 360	
2012	Street Fighter X Tekken	M. Bison (Vega)	PlayStation 3, PlayStation Vita, Xbox 360, Windows	
2012	Kingdom Hearts 3D: Dream Drop Distance	Xemnas	Nintendo 3DS	
2013	Kingdom Hearts HD 1.5 Remix	Xemnas	PlayStation 3	
2014	Bayonetta	Father Balder	Wii U, Windows, Nintendo Switch	
2014	Bayonetta 2	Father Balder	Wii U, Nintendo Switch	
2014	Kingdom Hearts HD 2.5 Remix	Xemnas	PlayStation 3	
2015	Higurashi no Naku Koro ni Sui	Yamaoki Kaoru	PlayStation 3, PlayStation Vita	
2015	Granblue Fantasy	Ippatsu	Android, iOS, web browser	
2015	Guilty Gear Xrd Revelator	Johnny	Arcade, PlayStation 3, PlayStation 4	
2015	Project X Zone 2	M. Bison (Vega), Black Face	Nintendo 3DS	
2016	Street Fighter V	M. Bison (Vega)	PlayStation 4, Windows	
2017	Kingdom Hearts HD 2.8 Final Chapter Prologue	Xemnas	PlayStation 4	
2017	Kingdom Hearts HD 1.5 + 2.5 Remix	Xemnas	PlayStation 4	
2018	Dragon Ball FighterZ	Cell	PlayStation 4, Xbox One, Windows	
2018	Soulcalibur VI	Yoshimitsu	PlayStation 4, Xbox One, Windows	
2018	Castlevania: Requiem	Dracula	PlayStation 4	
2019	Kingdom Hearts III	Xemnas	PlayStation 4, Xbox One	
	3×3 Eyes -Kyuusei Koushu-	Yang	PlayStation, Windows	
	The King of Fighters World	Igniz	Android, iOS	
2020	Girls' Frontline	Harvey Welkin	Android, iOS	
2021	Fist of the North Star Legends ReVIVE	M. Bison (Vega)	Android, iOS	
2022	The King of Fighters All Star	M. Bison (Vega)	Android, iOS	
2023	Guilty Gear Strive	Johnny	PlayStation 4, PlayStation 5, Windows, Arcade, Xbox One, Xbox Series X/S	
2024	Reynatis	Mugen Kaidou	Nintendo Switch, PS4, PS5, PC	

=== Unknown date ===
- Blue Dragon (Nene)
- Brave Story: New Traveler (Sogreth)
- Castlevania: Harmony of Dissonance (Dracula)
- Code Geass: Lost Colors (Emperor of Britannia)
- Crysis (Admiral Morrison, Nanosuit Voice (In Promotion Video))
- Cyber Troopers Virtual-On Marz (DYMN/Daimon)
- Disgaea 2: Cursed Memories (Overlord Zenon)
- Disgaea 2: Dark Hero Days (Overlord Zenon)
- Dragon Ball Z: Budokai (Cell)
- Dragon Ball Z: Budokai Tenkaichi (Cell)
- Eien no Aselia: The Spirit of Eternity Sword (Eternity Sword 'Wisdom'/Takios the Black Blade)
- Everybody's Golf 6 (Izaak)
- Fantasy Earth Zero (King Nias Ielsord)
- Flash Hiders (Moonrize)
- GetAmped2 (Daigokuin Raizo)
- Grandia (Baal)
- inFAMOUS (Kessler)
- Koihime Musō (Chōsen)
- Last Bronx (Tōru Kurosawa)
- Maji de Watashi ni Koi Shinasai! (Prime Minister)
- Makai Kingdom: Chronicles of the Sacred Tome (King Drake the Third)
- Metal Gear Solid: Portable Ops (Gene)
- Mobile Suit Gundam Side Story (Philip Hughes)
- Muv-Luv (Paul Radhabinod)
- Muv-Luv Alternative (Paul Radhabinod)
- Odin Sphere (Hindel, Wraith/Halja)
- Onimusha 3: Demon Siege (Akechi Mitsuhide)
- Onimusha: Dawn of Dreams (Ishida Mitsunari)
- Phantasy Star Universe (Renvolt Magashi)
- Princess Maker 4 (Daikun)
- Project X Zone 2 (M. Bison, Metal Face)
- Rhapsody III: Memories of Marl Kingdom (Fonfon, Guwanji)
- Rusty Hearts (Ian Jablonsky)
- Samurai Shodown: Edge of Destiny (Golba)
- SD Gundam G Generation series (Doku Dāmu, Philip Hughs)
- Sharin no Kuni: The Girl Among the Sunflowers (Houzuki)
- Skies of Arcadia (Gilder)
- SNK vs. Capcom series (M. Bison)
- SNK vs. Capcom: SVC Chaos (M. Bison)
- Star Ocean: First Departure (Ashlay Barnbelt)
- Summon Night EX-Thesis: Yoake no Tsubasa (Fighfar)
- Super Robot Wars series (Neue Regisseur, Stern Neue Regisseur, Maier V. Branstein, Alan Brady, Shapiro Keats, Ōta Kōichirō, Moon Will, Augustus)
- Super Smash Bros. for Nintendo 3DS and Wii U (Metal Face)
- Super Smash Bros. Ultimate (Metal Face)
- Tales of Destiny (PS2) (Barbatos Goetia)
- Tales of Innocence (Gardle)
- Tales of the World: Narikiri Dungeon 3 (Barbatos Goetia)
- Tales of the World: Radiant Mythology 2 (Barbatos Goetia)
- Tales of Vesperia (Barbatos Goetia)
- Tales of VS. (Barbatos Goetia)
- TERA (Samael Cranwood)
- Tom Clancy's Splinter Cell: Conviction (Victor Coste)
- Transformers: The Game (Megatron)
- Transformers: Revenge of the Fallen (Megatron)
- Tsuyokiss (Tachibana Heizō)
- Valkyrie Profile (Janus)
- Wild Arms Alter Code: F (Siegfried/Zeikfried)
- Xenoblade Chronicles (Mumkhar)
- Zettai Hero Kaizou Keikaku (Narrator)

=== Tokusatsu ===
Year	Series	Role	Notes	Source
1980	X-Bomber	Captain Custer		
1998	Seijuu Sentai Gingaman	Narrator		
1999	Seijuu Sentai Gingaman vs. Megaranger	Narrator		
2008	Kamen Rider Kiva: King of the Castle in the Demon World	Rey Kivat, Arc Kivat	Movie	
2010	Tensou Sentai Goseiger	Yuumajuu Zeibu of the Mummy	Ep. 18	
2010	Ultraman Zero: The Revenge of Belial	Iaron	Movie	
2018	Kamen Rider Build	Sclash Driver Voice, Twin Breaker Voice, Crocodile Crack Fullbottle Voice, Cross-Z Magma Knuckle Voice, Great Cross-Z Dragon Voice, Genius Fullbottle Voice (Voiced by Katsuya Kobayashi), Grease Blizzard Knuckle Voice	Eps. 17 – 48	

=== Overseas dubbing ===
Live-action

Series	Role	Voice dub for	Notes	Source
8mm	Dino Velvet	Peter Stormare		
The Chronicles of Narnia: The Lion, the Witch and the Wardrobe	Maugrim	Michael Madsen		
Cooties	Wade Johnson	Rainn Wilson		
Cowboy Bebop	Vicious	Alex Hassell		
The Cure	The Man with the Gout	Eric Campbell	2014 Star Channel edition	
Derailed	Mason Cole	Tomas Arana		
Duck, You Sucker!	Colonel Günther Ruiz	Antoine Saint-John		
Earthquake	Miles Quade	Richard Roundtree	1981 TBS and 1986 TV Asahi editions	
The Human Centipede (First Sequence)	Josef Heiter	Dieter Laser		
The Human Centipede 3 (Final Sequence)	Bill Boss	Dieter Laser		
Jack Reacher: Never Go Back	General James Harkness	Robert Knepper		
Last Action Hero	John Practice	F. Murray Abraham	1996 Fuji TV edition	
Legend	The Lord of Darkness	Tim Curry		
Mad Max 2	Pappagallo	Michael Preston	1991 TBS edition	
Mad Max 2	Wez	Vernon Wells	1997 TV Asahi edition	
Malcolm X	West Indian Archie	Delroy Lindo		
The Mask	Mitch Kellaway	Peter Riegert		
Me, Myself & Irene	Lt. Gerke	Chris Cooper		
On Her Majesty's Secret Service	Shaun Campbell	Bernard Horsfall	1979 TBS edition	
Prison Break	Theodore "T-Bag" Bagwell	Robert Knepper		
The Professionals	Bodie	Lewis Collins		
The Rink	Mr. Stout	Eric Campbell	2014 Star Channel edition	
Rocky IV	Ivan Drago	Dolph Lundgren	1989 TBS edition	
Seal Team Six: The Raid on Osama Bin Laden	Lieutenant Commander	Robert Knepper		
Sin City: A Dame to Kill For	Senator Roark	Powers Boothe		
Star Wars: Episode V – The Empire Strikes Back	Lando Calrissian	Billy Dee Williams		
Star Wars: Episode VI – Return of the Jedi	Lando Calrissian	Billy Dee Williams		
Star Wars: Episode IX – The Rise of Skywalker	Lando Calrissian	Billy Dee Williams		
Superman IV: The Quest for Peace	Nuclear Man	Gene Hackman	1989 TV Tokyo edition	
Three to Tango	Charles Newman	Dylan McDermott		
Transporter 3	Johnson	Robert Knepper		
World War Z	Ex-CIA Agent	David Morse		
Young Detective Dee: Rise of the Sea Dragon	Huo Yi	Dong Hu		

Animation

Series	Role	Notes	Source
Chuggington	Frostini		
G.I. Joe: A Real American Hero	Ripper		
Hotel Transylvania	Griffin		
Hotel Transylvania 2	Griffin		
Hotel Transylvania 3: Summer Vacation	Griffin		
Hotel Transylvania: Transformania	Griffin		
X-Men	Mister Sinister	TV Tokyo edition	
Transformers: Animated	Megatron		
