= Roullée =

- Part of Villeneuve-en-Perseigne
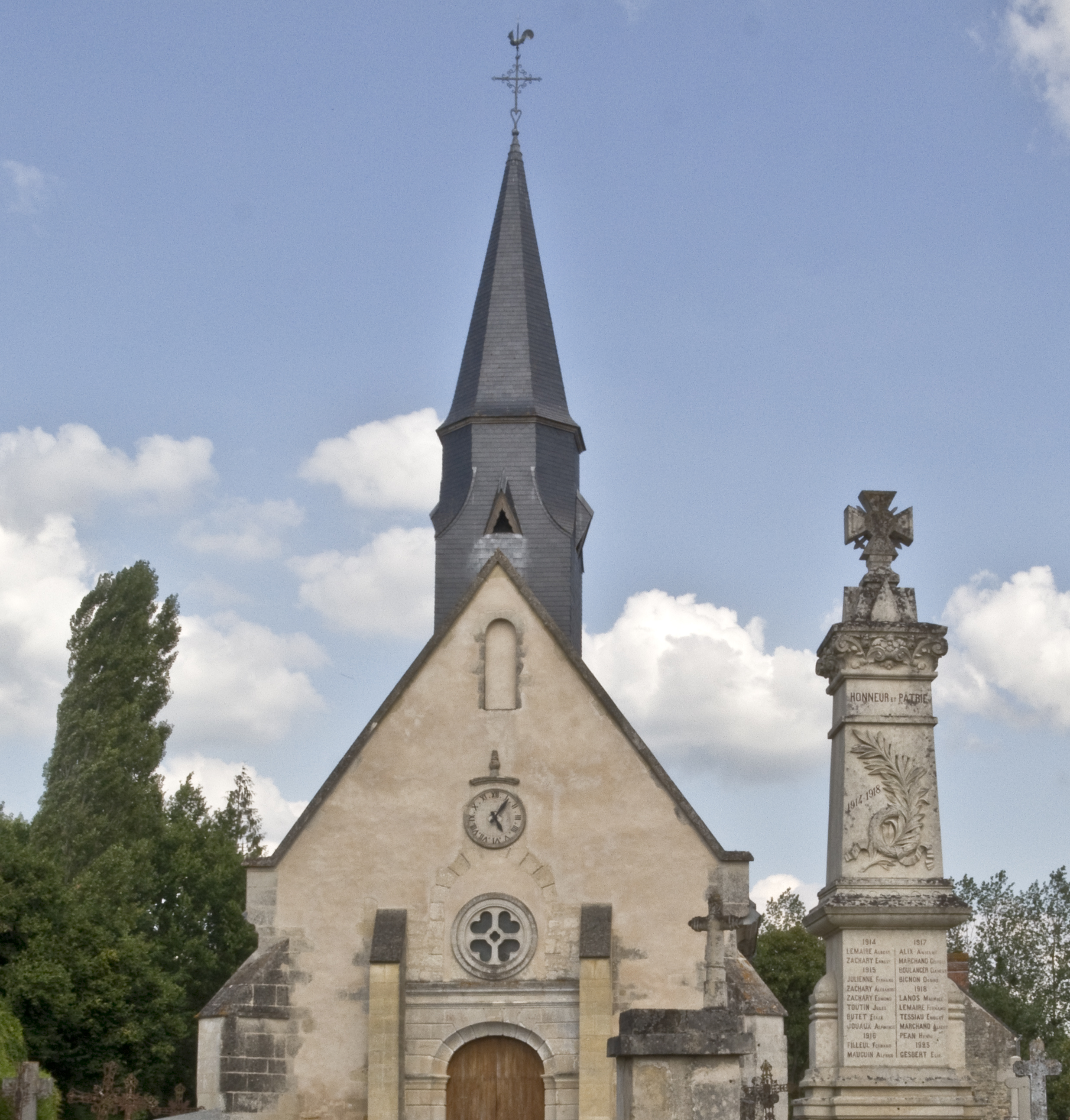
- Location of Roullée
- Location within France Location within Pays de la Loire
- Coordinates: 48°28′N 0°18′E
- Country: France
- Region: Pays de la Loire
- Department: Sarthe
- Arrondissement: Mamers
- Canton: Mamers
- Commune: Villeneuve-en-Perseigne
- Area^{1}: 19.93 km^{2} (7.70 sq mi)
- Highest elevation: 193 m (633 ft)
- Lowest elevation: 136 m (446 ft)
- Population (2022): 242
  - Density: 12.1/km^{2} (31.4/sq mi)
- Time zone: UTC+01:00 (CET)
  - Summer (DST): UTC+02:00 (CEST)
- Postal code: 72600
- ^{1} French Land Register data, which excludes lakes, ponds, glaciers > 1 km^{2} (0.386 sq mi or 247 acres) and river estuaries.

Roullée (French pronunciation: [ʁule]) is a former commune in the Sarthe department in the Pays de la Loire region in north-western France. In 2015 it became part of Villeneuve-en-Perseigne.

== See also ==
- Communes of the Sarthe department
