= Masami Yuki =

Japanese manga artist

Masami Yūki
- ゆうきまさみ
- Born: Shūji Satō; 19 December 1957 (age 68); Kutchan, Hokkaidō, Japan
- Occupation: Manga artist
- Years active: 1985–present
- Known for: Patlabor; Birdy the Mighty; Kyūkyoku Chōjin R

Masami Yuki (ゆうきまさみ, Yūki Masami), real name Shūji Satō (佐藤修司 Satō Shūji; born December 19, 1957), is a Japanese manga artist.

He is a member of the artist collective known as Headgear, along with Mamoru Oshii, Akemi Takada, Kazunori Itō, and Yutaka Izubuchi. He has received multiple awards for his work: the 1988 Seiun Award for Kyūkyoku Chōjin R, and the 1991 Shogakukan Manga Award for Mobile Police Patlabor.

After graduating from Kutchan High School, Yūki moved to Tokyo, where he worked as a manga assistant under artists like Miki Tori and Kaoru Shintani, who inspired him to create his own works. He began by publishing several works in doujinshi, and soon after began working as a professional manga artist with Weekly Shōnen Sunday. In the mid-1980s, he developed the original concept for a lighthearted mecha anime that would become Patlabor, which launched in 1988 with the Early Days OVA and Yūki's serialized manga. As of 2026, he continues to work on projects like Shinkurō, Hashiru! and Patlabor EZY.

== Works ==
- Aliens Next Door (1 tankōbon)
- Assemble Insert
- Atom: The Beginning
- Birdy the Mighty
  - Original version: 1 tankōbon
  - Remake: 20 tankōbon as of October 2008
- Birdy the Mighty: Evolution
  - 13 tankōbon as of October 2012
- Doyō Wide Satsujin Jiken (1 tankōbon, co-authored with Miki Tori)
  - Doyō Wide Satsujin Jiken: Kyōto Waraningyō Satsujin Jiken (1 tankōbon)
- Jaja Uma Grooming Up! (26 tankōbon, 14 bunkoban)
- Kyūkyoku Chōjin R (5 bunkobon)
- Magical Lucy
- Mariana Densetsu (3 tankōbon)
- Pangea no Musume Kunie (5 tankōbon)
- Parody World
- Mobile Police Patlabor (22 tankōbon, 11 wideban, 11 bunkoban)
- Shinkurō, Hashiru! (11 tankōbon as of September 2022)
- Yamato Takeru no Bōken
- Yūki Masami no Hateshinai Monogatari (2 tankōbon)

Yuki is also the designer of the avatar mascot for the Vocaloid Gumi.
