= Candy Soft =

Japanese video game publisher

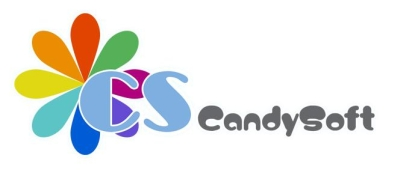
- Product type: Visual novels
- Current owner: Inter Heart
- Country: Japan
- Introduced: April 25, 1997
- Website: www.candysoft.jp

Candy Soft (きゃんでぃそふと / キャンディソフト, Kyandi Sofuto) is a Japanese visual novel publishing brand owned and used by Inter Heart.

== Games released ==
- April 25, 1997 - (ときめいて誘惑)
- June 27, 2003 - Nee, Chanto Shiyou yo! (姉、ちゃんとしようよっ！)
- June 25, 2004 - Nee, Chanto Shiyou yo! 2 (姉、ちゃんとしようよっ！2)
- August 26, 2005 - Tsuyokiss (つよきす)
- December 15, 2006 - Minikiss ~Tsuyokiss Fan Disc~ (みにきす ～つよきすファンディスク～)
- September 21, 2007 - Sweet! (すうぃと！)
- April 25, 2008 - Tsuyokiss 2gakki (つよきす2学期)
- July 31, 2009 - Mecha-Mimi (メカミミ)
- July 30, 2010 - Motto nee, Chanto Shiyou yo! (もっと 姉、ちゃんとしようよっ！)
- March 31, 2011 - Tsuyokiss 3gakki (つよきす３学期)
