= Chassé, Sarthe =

Chassé
- Part of Villeneuve-en-Perseigne
- Location of Chassé
- Location within France Location within Pays de la Loire
- Coordinates: 48°26′44″N 0°12′15″E
- Country: France
- Region: Pays de la Loire
- Department: Sarthe
- Arrondissement: Mamers
- Canton: Mamers
- Commune: Villeneuve-en-Perseigne
- Area^{1}: 7.3 km^{2} (2.8 sq mi)
- Population (2022): 182
  - Density: 25/km^{2} (65/sq mi)
- Demonym(s): Chasséin, Chasséine
- Time zone: UTC+01:00 (CET)
  - Summer (DST): UTC+02:00 (CEST)
- Postal code: 72670 - 72600
- ^{1} French Land Register data, which excludes lakes, ponds, glaciers > 1 km^{2} (0.386 sq mi or 247 acres) and river estuaries.

Chassé (French pronunciation: [ʃase]) is a former commune in the Sarthe department in the Pays de la Loire region in north-western France. In 2015 it became part of Villeneuve-en-Perseigne. Its population was 182 in 2022.

== See also ==
- Communes of the Sarthe department
