= Montigny, Sarthe =

Montigny
- Part of Villeneuve-en-Perseigne
- Location of Montigny
- Location within France Location within Pays de la Loire
- Coordinates: 48°27′25″N 0°11′01″E
- Country: France
- Region: Pays de la Loire
- Department: Sarthe
- Arrondissement: Mamers
- Canton: Mamers
- Commune: Villeneuve-en-Perseigne
- Area^{1}: 3.85 km^{2} (1.49 sq mi)
- Highest elevation: 156 m (512 ft)
- Lowest elevation: 133 m (436 ft)
- Population (2022): 23
  - Density: 6.0/km^{2} (15/sq mi)
- Time zone: UTC+01:00 (CET)
  - Summer (DST): UTC+02:00 (CEST)
- Postal code: 72600
- ^{1} French Land Register data, which excludes lakes, ponds, glaciers > 1 km^{2} (0.386 sq mi or 247 acres) and river estuaries.

Montigny (French pronunciation: [mɔ̃tiɲi]) is a former commune in the Sarthe department in the region of Pays de la Loire in north-western France. In 2015 it became part of Villeneuve-en-Perseigne. Its population was 23 in 2022.

== See also ==
- Communes of the Sarthe department
