= Kyūkyoku Chōjin R =

Japanese manga series

- Manga volume 1 cover, featuring R. Ichiro Tanaka

究極超人あ～る (Kyuukyoku Choujin a~ru)
- Genre: Science fiction comedy
- Manga
- Written by: Masami Yuki
- Published by: Shogakukan
- Imprint: Shōnen Sunday Comics
- Magazine: Weekly Shōnen Sunday
- Original run: August 7, 1985 – July 22, 1987
- Volumes: 9 (+1 volume in 2018)
- Original video animation
- Directed by: Ami Tomobuki
- Produced by: Atsushi Sugita; Makoto Kubo; Toyomi Akimoto
- Written by: Shoko Uehara; Ami Tomobuki
- Music by: Masayuki Yamamoto; Kohei Tanaka
- Studio: Studio COA
- Released: September 26, 1991
- Runtime: 74 minutes
- icon

Kyūkyoku Chōjin R (Japanese: 究極超人あ～る, Hepburn: Kyūkyoku Chōjin Āru; "Ultimate Superhuman R") is a Japanese manga series written and illustrated by Masami Yuki. It was serialized in Shogakukan's Weekly Shōnen Sunday from 1985 to 1987. The series revolved around a teenage robot named R. Ichiro Tanaka. Later, it was revealed that R's creator Dr. Narihara only built R for a failed attempt to take over the world.

== Characters ==
R. Ichiro Tanaka (R・田中 一郎, R. Ichirō Tanaka)
Voiced by: Kaneto Shiozawa
A fifteen-year-old android boy who begins going to a Japanese school. R was made for Dr. Narihara's world domination. However, almost all time the world domination is forgotten. He is naive, friendly and airheaded, but loves to eat rice. R has a tendency to turn his head around 180 degrees, take off his hands or feet, and get off a bicycle without stopping it. He modelled after Dr. Narihara's son Akira, who is barely aware of R's existence. On tightening a screw in his head, he turns coolheaded, though he comes back after a while. In "Kyukyoku Sentai Kougaman", R is Kouga Black.
Sango Otojima (大戸島 さんご, Ōtojima Sango)
Voiced by: Hiroko Kasahara
A tomboyish girl who is in the camera club. She first meets R on a club trip to the forest, where she learns of his love of rice. Sango has an abnormal motor nerve. At first she is horrified that he is in her homeroom class, but befriends him soon enough. Sango later appears to have a crush on R. In "Kyukyoku Sentai Kougaman", Sango is Kouga Blue.
Shiiko Horikawa (堀川 椎子)
Voiced by: Miina Tominaga
Sango's best friend, who is very athletic, and is the only member of the Camera Club seriously considering a career as a photographer. she called "Shii-chan". Shiiko is quick-witted and is often called "Mother of the Camera Club", who repeatedly saves the club from a variety of crises. She is always present to keep Sango company, but towards the end of the manga, she begins to appear less and less.
Tosaka the Senior (鳥坂センパイ, Tosaka-senpai)
Voiced by: Akira Kamiya
The president of the Camera Club. a senior student who has enormous school pride, a sense of justice, an aggressive personality and a tendency to flip people the middle finger. Tosaka is very arrogant and unreasonable. Despite having graduated late into the series, he still helps with the Camera Club, and it is hinted that he sleeps in the club room. While his temper is short with R, he enjoys R's company, since R follows his orders and willingly takes a beating. Tosaka is always seen with sunglasses over his eyes (even when his glasses are off, his eyes are hidden by his hair), and gets around via motorcycle.
Tawaba (たわば [束場], Tawaba)
Voiced by: Aki Tomato
The oldest member of the Camera Club, aged 20 at the start of the series, and it is hinted that Tawaba has been held back a few years. He is a chain-smoker, easily agitated and cynical. Tosaka appears to be his best friend, but Tawaba is deeply annoyed by R's presence.
Asano (あさの) and Kishida (きしだ)
Voiced by: Hisayoshi Izaki (Asano), Voiced by: Arihiro Hase (Kishida)
Two members of the camera club who are close friends. Asano wears glasses and has a stuttering problem, and Kishida has small eyes and slicked-back hair. They are mostly in the background of the camera club.
Sayoko Amano (天野 小夜子, Amano Sayoko)
Voiced by: Michiru Shimada (Drama CD), Voiced by: Mako Hyodo (OVA)
A girl who begun going to her old classroom (the former Camera Club's room) as a ghost. Her body was still in the hospital, unconscious from a traffic accident. (but her injury is extent in which the elbow was abraded.) Sayoko hated returning to her body, but she recovers instead of moving into a Harukaze high school. She can be rather controlling and mean, and clashes with Tosaka. Sayoko became the camera club's president of R's successor, and won a large amount expense from Division of Enforcement. She had been drawn to R's body in many cases because she liked the magnetic field generated from R.
Makoto Hyodo (兵藤 信, Hyōdō Makoto)
Voiced by: Yuki Masami (Drama CD), Voiced by: Katsumi Toriumi (OVA)
A friendly male student with transvestite tendencies. He meets the camera club by answering their call for attractive female models, revealing his gender shortly after, much to the club's later horror. He appears to hold some sort of affection for Gou, and is good friends with Erika. In "Kyukyoku Sentai Kougaman", Makoto is Kouga Yellow.
Erika Saionji (西園寺 えりか, Saionji Erika)
Voiced by: Akemi Takada (Drama CD), Voiced by: Mika Kanai (OVA)
A female freshman student, whom R discovered when he accidentally tripped and pulled down her skirt. Despite being in the wrong school, Erika is hyper, sweet, and cheerful. Her older sister Marii also goes to school and is embarrassed by her younger sister's presence. Erika has a very outward crush on R, and has fought with Sayoko over this. In "Kyukyoku Sentai Kougaman", Erika is Kouga Pink.
Gou Magaki (曲垣 剛, Magaki Gō)
Voiced by: Ami Tomobuki (Drama CD), Voiced by: Toru Furuya (OVA)
A somewhat-lunkheaded member of the camera club, mostly seen with Makoto and Erika. He enjoys flower arrangement, and whenever he is shocked or surprised, he makes a reaction similar to The Scream painting. He, Erika and Makoto are very close as a group, and look up to R, Shiiko and Sango as their senior students. Makoto is his childhood friend since kindergarten. In "Kyukyoku Sentai Kougaman", Magaki is Kouga Red.
Marii Saionji (西園寺 まりい, Saionji Marī)
Voiced by: Maria Kawamura
The pushy leader of the student council. She hates the Camera Club, mostly R and Tosaka, and is often accompanied by her makeshift assistant Iwashimizu. Marii is nearsighted, but refuses to wear her glasses in public for fear of ruining her image. Known at school as the "Iron Woman". Her family owns a stamp tour agency, something that comes into play during the OVA. She loves volleyball and getting adoration from the student body. Her design was based on Maria Kawamura, who is also her voice actress.
Hitoshi Iwashimizu (鰯水 等, Iwashimizu Hitoshi)
Voiced by: Burajiru (Drama CD) :Voiced by: Hirotaka Suzuoki (OVA)
Marii's companion and adviser. Iwashimizu is handsome and narcissistic. He is known as a "seducer" and for having a very good memory, but can be quite spineless. Iwashimizu formerly hated and avoided the Camera Club, but he compulsively joined because of a careless word, and his activity with them increases through the series. He appears to be in love with Marii.
Kamoike (鴨池, Kamoike)
The intellectual adviser of the student council. His first name is unknown. He wears glasses. His face is plain but he is a very cool-headed realist, and is the student council's brain. Kamoike only appears in the manga.
Dr. Nariyuki Narihara (成原 成行, Narihara Nariyuki)
Voiced by: Takeshi Aono
A self-proclaimed mad scientist who built R. His original plan was to utilize R in a plan for world domination, but scrapped the idea when Narihara realized it would be too much work. He throws R away, and only restarts interest in him when R enrolls himself in school. Narihara has a wife and a son named Akira, whom he based R's looks on. Narihara and his wife originally told the Camera Club that Akira died and was rebuilt in an Astro Boy-esque accident, only to have Akira walk by shortly after.
Shimasaki (島崎)
Voiced by: Yuuji Kaida (Drama CD), Voiced by: Taoki Tatsuta (OVA)
The effeminate, pudgy leader of the Civil Engineering Research Club, who always has eyes like stars. He becomes student body president after Marii graduates, but tends to pay more attention to building and construction than actually running the council. He's kind, sort of timid, and has a strong sense of responsibility. In the OVA, Shimazaki and his construction crew rescue R and company from being lost in the forest and give them a ride to the next train station.
R #29 (R・29号 (アール・デコ), R 29-gou (R. Deco))
R's younger sister, who Narihara builds near the end of the series. Both R and R. 29 have the same airy facial expression, but R29 is smarter than him and more devoted to her "father". She later becomes the key tool in Narihara's second attempt to take over the world. At her insistence, Narihara names her "R. Hideko Takamine", but she prefers "R. Deco" or "Carmen". Deco was designed by Akemi Takada.

== Media ==
=== Manga ===
Kyūkyoku Chōjin R, written and illustrated by Masami Yuki, was serialized in Shogakukan's shōnen manga magazine Weekly Shōnen Sunday from August 7, 1985, to July 22, 1987. Shogakukan collected its chapters in nine tankōbon volumes, released from January 18, 1986, to August 18, 1987. The manga was re-published in five bunkoban volumes, released from March 17 to July 17, 1998. The manga was also re-published in four wideban volumes, released between August 10 and November 9, 1991. An additional volume was published on August 9, 2018.

==== Volumes ====
No.	Release date	ISBN
1	January 18, 1986	4-09-121411-8
2	April 18, 1986	4-09-121412-6
3	July 16, 1986	4-09-121413-4
4	August 13, 1986	4-09-121414-2
5	October 18, 1986	4-09-121415-0
6	December 13, 1986	4-09-121416-9
7	March 18, 1987	4-09-121417-7
8	June 18, 1987	4-09-121418-5
9	August 18, 1987	4-09-121419-3

=== Original video animation ===
An original video animation (OVA) was released by Bandai Visual on September 26, 1991. The plot features R and the Camera Club going on a stamp tour throughout Japan, the tour agency being owned by Marii's family, who added the threat of the Camera Club being closed down unless they could collect all the stamps by 6:00 pm. The OVA was re-released on DVD on July 25, 2001.

=== Soundtrack ===
On March 21, 2007, Columbia Music Entertainment re-released 4 Image albums (CDs) for the series, based on the original LP released from the mid-eighties. There were Drama Special, Anime Original Karaoke, Manatsu no Ichiyazuke and Kyukyoku Chojin R Box, which featured the entire cast of characters either singing, performing radio dramas, or the female voice actors performing songs based on the series.

=== Other media ===
R was one of the characters used for the PlayStation Portable game, Sunday VS Magazine: Shuuketsu! Choujou Daikessen!, which is used to commemorate the 50th anniversary of Shogakukan's Shōnen Sunday and Kodansha's Weekly Shōnen Magazine manga magazines.

== Reception ==
In 1988, Kyūkyoku Chōjin R received the Seiun Award for the best comic of the year.
