= Chasse (song) =

Single by Kaori Utatsuki
- B-side: "Change of Heart"
- Released: November 21, 2007
- Genre: J-Pop
- Length: 17:53
- Label: Geneon
- Songwriter(s): Kazuya Takase, Kotoko
- Producer(s): I've Sound

Kaori Utatsuki singles chronology
"Shining Stars Bless" (2007)	"Chasse" (2007)

"Chasse" is Kaori Utatsuki's 2nd single under Geneon Entertainment. It was released on November 21, 2007. The title track was used as the third ending theme for the anime series Hayate no Gotoku!. It managed to get in the #30 spot in the Oricon charts with a total sales of 4,984 copies in its first week.

== Track listing ==
1. Chasse—3:45
  - Composition: Kazuya Takase
  - Arrangement: Tomoyuki Nakazawa, Maiko Iuchi
  - Lyrics: Kotoko
2. Change of Heart—5:12
  - Composition: Maiko Iuchi
  - Arrangement: Maiko Iuchi
  - Lyrics: Kaori Utatsuki
3. Chasse (instrumental) -- 3:45
4. Change of Heart (instrumental) -- 5:11
