= List of animated direct-to-video series =

This is a list of animated direct-to-video series, that is, animated series released direct-to-video.

== List ==
Animated direct-to-video series
| Year(s) | Title | Episodes | Country |
|---|---|---|---|
| 1983–84 | Dallos | 4 | Japan |
| 1983–93 | Lion Books | 6 | Japan |
| 1984–87 | Cream Lemon | 16 | Japan |
| 1984–85 | Lolita Anime | 6 | Japan |
| 1985–86 | Area 88 | 3 | Japan |
| 1985–87 | Dream Hunter Rem | 3+1 | Japan |
| 1985–87 | Fight! Iczer One | 3 | Japan |
| 1985–88 | Megazone 23 | 4 | Japan |
| 1985–86 | Mujigen Hunter Fandora | 3 | Japan |
| 1985–93 | Rumic World | 5 | Japan |
| 1985–92 | The Greatest Adventure: Stories from the Bible | 13 | USA |
| 1985–88 | What's Michael? | 2 | Japan |
| 1986 | Baribari Legend | 2 | Japan |
| 1986–87 | Heavy Metal L-Gaim | 3 | Japan |
| 1986 | My Favorite Fairy Tales | 10 | USA |
| 1986–88 | Kizuoibito | 5 | Japan |
| 1986–90 | Legend of Lyon Flare | 2 | Japan |
| 1986 | Panzer World Galient | 3 | Japan |
| 1986–90 | Violence Jack | 3 | Japan |
| 1987–91 | Bubblegum Crisis | 8 | Japan |
| 1987–89 | Dangaioh | 3 | Japan |
| 1987–88 | Original Dirty Pair | 10 | Japan |
| 1987 | Phoenix | 2 | Japan |
| 1987–89 | Urotsukidōji: Legend of the Overfiend | 3 | Japan |
| 1987–88 | Yōtōden | 3 | Japan |
| 1988 | Ace o Nerae! 2 | 13 | Japan |
| 1988–89 | Armor Hunter Mellowlink | 12 | Japan |
| 1988 | Clifford's Fun with... | 6 | USA |
| 1988–94 | Crying Freeman | 6 | Japan |
| 1988 | Dragon Century | 2 | Japan |
| 1988–89 | Gunbuster | 6 | Japan |
| 1988–90 | Hades Project Zeorymer | 4 | Japan |
| 1988–89 | Leina: Wolf Sword Legend | 3 | Japan |
| 1988–90 | Mahjong Hishō-den: Naki no Ryū | 3 | Japan |
| 1988–89 | Mobile Police Patlabor: The Early Days | 7 | Japan |
| 1988–89 | Salamander | 3 | Japan |
| 1988–89 | Someday Me | 3 | USA |
| 1988–94 | Spirit Warrior | 5 | Japan |
| 1988–89 | Vampire Princess Miyu | 4 | Japan |
| 1989–95 | The Adventures of McGee and Me! | 12 | USA |
| 1989–90 | Ace o Nerae! Final Stage | 12 | Japan |
| 1989 | Amada Anime Series: Super Mario Bros. | 3 | Japan |
| 1989–91 | Angel Cop | 6 | Japan |
| 1989 | Blood Reign: Curse of the Yoma | 2 | Japan |
| 1989–90 | Blue Sonnet | 5 | Japan |
| 1989–91 | Cleopatra DC | 3 | Japan |
| 1989–96 | Earthian | 4 | Japan |
| 1989 | Goku Midnight Eye | 2 | Japan |
| 1989–90 | Gosenzo-sama Banbanzai! | 6 | Japan |
| 1989–91 | Kimagure Orange Road | 8 | Japan |
| 1989–94 | Richard Scarry's Best Videos Ever! | 6 | USA |
| 1989–90 | Riki-Oh | 2 | Japan |
| 1989–94 | Stories to Remember | 6 | USA |
| 1989–91 | Tales of Yajikita College | 2 | Japan |
| 1989–91 | Ys | 7 | Japan |
| 1990 | 1+2=Paradise | 2 | Japan |
| 1990 | AD Police Files | 3 | Japan |
| 1990–98 | Be-Bop High School | 7 | Japan |
| 1990–91 | Britannica's Tales Around the World | 6 | USA |
| 1990–95 | Devil Hunter Yohko | 6 | Japan |
| 1990–91 | Fujiko F. Fujio's SF (Slightly Mysterious) Short Theater | 11 | Japan |
| 1990–92 | Guardian of Darkness | 3 | Japan |
| 1990–91 | The Hakkenden | 6 | Japan |
| 1990–92 | Mad Bull 34 | 4 | Japan |
| 1990–92 | New Dream Hunter Rem | 2 | Japan |
| 1990–92 | Osu!! Karate Bu | 4 | Japan |
| 1990 | Project A-ko: Gray Side/Blue Side | 2 | Japan |
| 1990–91 | Sol Bianca | 2 | Japan |
| 1990–91 | St. Michael Academy | 2 | Japan |
| 1990–91 | Timeless Tales from Hallmark | 8 | USA |
| 1990–91 | Urotsukidōji II: Legend of the Demon Womb | 2 | Japan |
| 1990–92 | Utsunomiko: Heaven Chapter | 13 | Japan |
| 1990 | Yagami-kun no Katei no Jijō | 3 | Japan |
| 1991–92 | 3×3 Eyes | 4 | Japan |
| 1991–2003 | Adventures in Odyssey | 17 | Japan |
| 1991 | Bubblegum Crash | 3 | Japan |
| 1991 | CB Chara Nagai Go World | 3 | Japan |
| 1991–92 | Detonator Orgun | 3 | Japan |
| 1991 | Ozanari Dungeon: The Tower of Wind | 3 | Japan |
| 1991–93 | Sohryuden: Legend of the Dragon Kings | 12 | Japan |
| 1991 | Sukeban Deka | 2 | Japan |
| 1993–94 | Adventure Kid | 3 | Japan |
| 1992–94 | Ai no Kusabi | 2 | Japan |
| 1992–93 | All Purpose Cultural Cat Girl Nuku Nuku | 6 | Japan |
| 1992 | Babel II | 4 | Japan |
| 1992–93 | Bastard!! | 6 | Japan |
| 1992 | Dragon Half | 2 | Japan |
| 1992–93 | Eternal Filena | 6 | Japan |
| 1992–93 | Genesis Survivor Gaiarth | 3 | Japan |
| 1992–98 | Giant Robo: The Day the Earth Stood Still | 7 | Japan |
| 1992–93 | Gorillaman | 4 | Japan |
| 1992–93 | Green Legend Ran | 3 | Japan |
| 1992–93 | K.O. Beast | 7 | Japan |
| 1992–93 | Nozomi Witches | 3 | Japan |
| 1992 | Super Dimensional Fortress Macross II: Lovers Again | 6 | Japan |
| 1992–2021 | Tenchi Muyo! Ryo-Ohki | 30 | Japan |
| 1992–94 | Tokyo Babylon | 2 | Japan |
| 1992–93 | Urotsukidōji III: Return of the Overfiend | 4 | Japan |
| 1992–93 | Ushio & Tora | 11 | Japan |
| 1992 | Video Girl Ai | 6 | Japan |
| 1992–93 | Wolf Guy | 6 | Japan |
| 1992–93 | Ys II: Castle in the Heavens | 4 | Japan |
| 1993 | 8 Man After | 4 | Japan |
| 1993–94 | Alien Defender Geo-Armor: Kishin Corps | 7 | Japan |
| 1993 | Ambassador Magma | 13 | Japan |
| 1993–98 | Bad Boys | 5 | Japan |
| 1993 | Battle Angel | 2 | Japan |
| 1993–2011 | Black Jack | 12 | Japan |
| 1993–94 | Casshan: Robot Hunter | 4 | Japan |
| 1993–95 | The Hakkenden: A New Saga | 7 | Japan |
| 1993–95 | Idol Defense Force Hummingbird | 4 | Japan |
| 1993–94 | JoJo's Bizarre Adventure | 6 | Japan |
| 1993 | Rei Rei | 2 | Japan |
| 1993 | The Cockpit | 3 | Japan |
| 1993–95 | The Heroic Legend of Arslan | 4 | Japan |
| 1993–94 | Mega Man: Upon a Star | 3 | Japan |
| 1993–94 | Please Save My Earth | 3 | Japan |
| 1993–95 | Urotsukidōji: Inferno Road | 3 | Japan |
| 1993–2015 | VeggieTales | 50 | USA |
| 1994 | Armored Trooper VOTOMS: Shining Heresy | 5 | Japan |
| 1994 | Bounty Dog | 2 | Japan |
| 1994 | Combustible Campus Guardress | 4 | Japan |
| 1994 | Final Fantasy: Legend of the Crystals | 4 | Japan |
| 1994–95 | Gatchaman | 3 | Japan |
| 1994 | Genocyber | 5 | Japan |
| 1994 | Iria: Zeiram the Animation | 6 | Japan |
| 1994–95 | Maps | 4 | Japan |
| 1994–95 | New Cutie Honey | 8 | Japan |
| 1994–95 | Sins of the Sisters | 2 | Japan |
| 1994–95 | Wild 7 | 2 | Japan |
| 1995–96 | 3×3 Eyes: Legend of the Divine Demon | 3 | Japan |
| 1995–96 | El-Hazard: The Magnificent World | 7 | Japan |
| 1995–96 | Gunsmith Cats | 2 | Japan |
| 1995–96 | Super Atragon | 2 | Japan |
| 1995–96 | The Beginner's Bible | 13 | USA |
| 1995–97 | Wedding Peach DX | 4 | Japan |
| 1995–96 | Yamato 2520 | 4 | Japan |
| 1996–99 | New Legend of Lyon Flare | 2 | Japan |
| 1996 | Sonic the Hedgehog | 2 | Japan |
| 1996–97 | Sorcerer Hunters | 3 | Japan |
| 1996 | The Special Duty Combat Unit Shinesman | 2 | Japan |
| 1997 | El-Hazard: The Magnificent World 2 | 4 | Japan |
| 1997–98 | Night Warriors: Darkstalkers' Revenge | 4 | Japan |
| 1997 | Rayearth | 3 | Japan |
| 1997 | Sakura Diaries | 12 | Japan |
| 1997 | Variable Geo | 3 | Japan |
| 1997–98 | Welcome to Pia Carrot!! | 3 | Japan |
| 1997–2011 | Baby Einstein | 34 | USA |
| 1998 | All Purpose Cultural Cat-Girl Nuku Nuku DASH! | 12 | Japan |
| 1998–2000 | Blue Submarine No. 6 | 4 | Japan |
| 1998–99 | Jigoku Sensei Nūbē | 3 | Japan |
| 1998–99 | Queen Emeraldas | 4 | Japan |
| 1998 | Tekken | 2 | Japan |
| 1998 | Yokohama Kaidashi Kikou | 2 | Japan |
| 1998–99 | Welcome to Pia Carrot!! 2 | 3 | Japan |
| 1999–2002 | 10 Tokyo Warriors | 6 | Japan |
| 1999 | TwinBee Paradise | 3 | Japan |
| 1999–2000 | Welcome to Pia Carrot!! 2 DX | 6 | Japan |
| 1999–2000 | Words Worth | 5 | Japan |
| 1998–2003 | The Wacky Adventures of Ronald McDonald | 6 | USA |
| 2000–03 | 3-2-1 Penguins! | 6 | USA |
| 2000 | Initial D Extra Stage | 2 | Japan |
| 2000 | Little Dogs on the Prairie | 8 | USA |
| 2000–01 | Noah's Park | 3 | USA |
| 2000–02 | JoJo's Bizarre Adventure | 7 | Japan |
| 2000–03 | Adventures in Odyssey: The New Series | 4 | USA |
| 2001–03 | Bible Black | 6 | Japan |
| 2001 | Hanaukyo Maid Team | 3 | Japan |
| 2001–03 | Happy Lesson | 5 | Japan |
| 2001–03 | Marine a Go Go | 3 | Japan |
| 2001–02 | Mazinkaiser | 7 | Japan |
| 2002 | Bible Black: Origins | 2 | Japan |
| 2002 | The Urotsuki | 3 | Japan |
| 2002 | Words Worth Gaiden | 2 | Japan |
| 2002–03 | Yokohama Kaidashi Kikou: Quiet Country Café | 2 | Japan |
| 2002–03 | Larryboy: The Cartoon Adventures | 4 | USA |
| 2002–03 | Ribbits! | 3 | USA |
| 2002–10 | Hermie and Friends | 15 | USA |
| 2004 | Happy Lesson: The Final | 3 | Japan |
| 2004 | Mirage of Blaze | 3 | Japan |
| 2004–05 | Variable Geo Neo | 3 | Japan |
| 2004–06 | Baby Faith | 6 | USA |
| 2004–06 | On the Farm with Farmer Bob | 4 | USA |
| 2004–07 | Bible Black: New Testament | 6 | Japan |
| 2005–06 | Bible Black Only | 3 | Japan |
| 2005–06 | Rugrats: Tales from the Crib | 2 | USA |
| 2005–06 | Boin | 2 | Japan |
| 2005–07 | BOZ the Bear | 16 | USA |
| 2006–07 | _Summer | 2 | Japan |
| 2006-10 | Hoteldebotel | 4 | Netherlands |
| 2007–09 | Resort Boin | 3 | Japan |
| 2008 | Naisho no Tsubomi | 3 | Japan |
| 2009–11 | Kanojo × Kanojo × Kanojo | 3 | Japan |
| 2010 | Armored Trooper VOTOMS: Phantom Chapter | 6 | Japan |
| 2010–11 | Koe de Oshigoto! The Animation | 2 | Japan |
| 2010 | Kyō, Koi o Hajimemasu | 2 | Japan |
| 2010-14 | Lo Mejor de Clan | 14 | Spain |
| 2011–12 | Hakuōki Sekkaroku | 6 | Japan |
| 2011–12 | Imouto Paradise! | 2 | Japan |
| 2012–15 | Hori-san to Miyamura-kun -Shin Gakki- | 3 | Japan |
| 2013 | Corpse Party: Tortured Souls | 4 | Japan |
| 2013 | Gargantia on the Verdurous Planet | 2 | Japan |
| 2013–14 | Ghost in the Shell: Arise | 4 | Japan |
| 2013 | Imouto Paradise! 2 | 2 | Japan |
| 2014–15 | Suisei no Gargantia ~Meguru Kōro, Haruka~ | 2 | Japan |

== See also ==
- List of animated internet series
- Lists of animated television series
