= List of Patlabor episodes =

Cover of the Region A Blu-ray release of the first Patlabor OVA released by Maiden Japan

Patlabor, a franchise created by the group Headgear, has been adapted into three anime versions between 1988 and 1992, including the first OVA series Patlabor: The Early Days, Patlabor: The TV Series and its follow up OVA series, Patlabor: The New Files. A live-action follow-up to The Early Days continuity, The Next Generation: Patlabor, was released in 2014–2015.

In 1988, Sunrise produced a seven-episode OVA series, this was the basis for the two movies that were to follow. After the success of the OVA series, they produced a television series aired on NTV from 1989 to 1990, which was based on the manga by Masami Yuki, and thus it is an alternate re-telling of the Patlabor series. A second OVA series, which was the sequel to the television series was released on the LaserDisc and VHS tapes of the television series, from 1990 to 1992.

All three anime series were licensed in Region 1 format by Central Park Media. They were released onto VHS and DVD. However, CPM had filed for Chapter 11 bankruptcy in April 2009 and ceased operations. In 2013, Maiden Japan had re-licensed the first OVA series and later, the television series on DVD and Blu-ray.

== Patlabor: The Early Days ==
From 1988 to 1989, the seven-episode OVA series were produced by Studio Deen. It is distributed by Bandai Visual and Tohokushinsha Film in Japan and originally Central Park Media and later Maiden Japan in North America. The English dub was produced by Matlin Recording in New York City, New York. The storyline is the start of the Patlabor series, that would be followed by the two Patlabor movies, Patlabor: The Movie and Patlabor 2: The Movie.

The series was released straight to VHS and LaserDisc from April 25, 1988, to June 25, 1989. It was released onto DVD in two volumes on April 20, 2000, and was later re-issued as a box set on May 25, 2007. A Blu-ray box set was released on July 23, 2010.

Discotek announced in February 2026 that they will release the OVA.

No.	Title	Directed by	Original release date
1	"Second Unit, Move Out!"; Transliteration: "Dainishoutai Shutsudou seyo" (Japanese: 第2小隊出動せよ)	Mamoru Oshii	April 25, 1988
It is day one of the formation of the second division of the Special Vehicles Unit 2 (SV2). The team seems to be a bunch of misfits. Noa, a girl that loves labors a little too much; Asuma, a cadet who does not want to be there; Ohta, a gun maniac; Shinshi, a hen-pecked husband; and Hiromi, a gentle giant of a man. Leading this squad is Captain Goto, a man who seems rather laid back, but is quite a strategist and an excellent cop. Unfortunately, their new Patrol Labors (or Patlabors) are stuck in traffic, and they are forced to do some weeding around the hangars. Soon they are dispatched to apprehend an armed terrorist Labor, but first they will need to retrieve their Patlabors en route to the crime scene from the middle of a traffic jam. After a rather disastrous pick-up, they head off to trap the Labor in Ueno park, but both Ohta's and Noa's Labors are attacked, losing a head and an arm off their Labors, respectively. Asuma tells Noa to turn her rage back on the criminal. The criminal has no chance of escaping Noa's anger now.
2	"Longshot"; Transliteration: "Rongushotto" (Japanese: ロングショット)	Mamoru Oshii	June 25, 1988
The mayor of New York is coming to Tokyo to inspect the Babylon Project – a long-term landfill project to reclaim Tokyo Bay. All of the Tokyo Police force are assigned to protect the mayor including the SV2. To help them, the New York Police force has sent Kanuka Clancy, a Japanese-American woman who immediately causes suspicion amongst the SV2, and much interest amongst most of the male squad members. The SV2's mission is mainly for show, but they soon find themselves in the middle of a terrorist plot. Asuma discovers a fake Police Mobile Command Center filled with missiles. It is up to Asuma to defuse it, with Kanuka giving him instructions over the police radio, but he has only 10 minutes to do so, and no previous experience.
3	"The 450-Million-Year-Old Trap"; Transliteration: "Yon oku go-sen man nen no Wana" (Japanese: 4億5千万年の罠)	Mamoru Oshii	July 25, 1988
A series of incidents occur in Tokyo Bay including a damaged undersea cable, and a car being pulled off a pier. Could this be the work of an actual sea monster? Detective Matsui of the Metropolitan Tokyo Police Department asks Captain Goto for help. Shige and Sakaki help pilot a remote control Labor, to search for what caused the incidents. The Labor is destroyed, and Shige is convinced that the monster exists. The SV2 are given orders to kill the monster; however, they discover something even more bizarre. Note: This episode pays homage to 1954 film, Godzilla, as well as other classic Kaiju films.
4	"The Tragedy of L"; Transliteration: "L no Higeki" (Japanese: Lの悲劇)	Mamoru Oshii	September 25, 1988
Division 2 are called upon to help with a hostage situation at a video shop, but Ohta's temper gets the better of him, and he blows away half of the shop as well as stopping the criminals. Goto decides that his team need retraining and sends them back to the academy. They arrive but strangely there are no cadets there. The team decides to take a bath, but the water soon turns the color of blood. They later discover that it is in fact paint from a paint bullet, which bizarrely scares the instructor. Later that night, Ohta is haunted by a ghostly girl who only says "Don't Shoot", and the others see a Labor with a skeleton pilot that seems to be roaming the grounds. The next day, Noa and Asuma ditch their training to go to the local shop. There Asuma meets the shop owner, an old man he knew when he was a cadet training at the academy. The old man tells him that an accident occurred several months ago. A young woman who was one of the spectators at a mock battle was hit and killed with a paint bullet from a Labor gun. Is the academy really haunted by her spirit?
5	"The SV2's Longest Day (Part 1)"; Transliteration: "Nika no ichiban nagai Hi (Zenpen)" (Japanese: 二課の一番長い日（前編）)	Mamoru Oshii	November 10, 1988
The Second Unit are on vacation. Most of the team have a place to go except Goto, who just seems to want to hang around the office with Shinobu, and Asuma who decides to go to his father's factory. He meets Jitsuyama, the manager of the factory, and family friend. He discovers that Shinohara Heavy Industries are building a prototype JGSDF Labor. Asuma is quite disgusted by this. Jitsuyama suggests that he should see his father more often, but Asuma says that he had already seen him today, and they already fought. He decides to visit Shinshi and later Kanuka, but gets the feeling he is not wanted. The only option left is Noa, he calls only to discover that she lives in Hokkaido, and he will have to catch the train to get there. Meanwhile in Tokyo, a police road block stops a truck. One of the policemen becomes suspicious when he sees a Labor under the truck's tarp. He asks to see the Labors' permit, but the truck runs the road block. The police give chase, but the Labor in the back of the truck fires upon them destroying all the police cars following. It is a JGSDF Labor. Asuma is waiting in a restaurant for Noa to meet him. A distinguished man in his 40s enters the restaurant and orders a bowl of steaming hot noodles, and covers them with cayenne pepper. He finishes the bowl quickly and looks straight at Asuma with a cold glare. Noa finally arrives to pick him up and take him back to her parents' house. Back in Tokyo, Goto lets on to Shinobu that the real reason that he has stayed behind is because some suspicious men are watching the SV2. The men discover that Shinobu and Goto are watching them back, and speed off in their van. Preempting their moves, Goto asks Sakaki to take one of the Labors back to the factory. Later that night, Goto calls Shinobu outside her house. He tells her that a truck with a JGSDF Labor ran a road block and shot up several police cars. With the JGSDF in the middle of war games, it will take several days for them to account for all their Labors. Are the JGSDF trying to stage a coup? Goto asks Shinobu to help him in his plan to thwart it. The next day, JGSDF rebels invade Tokyo. They take over the SV2, but Goto has already shipped out the Patlabors back to the factory via the bay, away from the prying eyes of the men who have been spying on them for the last few days. Shinobu and Division 1 are at Police HQ and are blocking the path of the JGSDF. She states she will not move until the siege is over. Noa and Asuma watch the situation on TV. They show a picture of the ringleader. Asuma is shocked to discover it was the same man he met in the restaurant. He is Kiyoteru Kai, a man that Captain Goto knows quite well. Like the rest of Division 2, Noa and Asuma rush back to Tokyo to help.
6	"The SV2's Longest Day (Part 2)"; Transliteration: "Nika no ichiban nagai Hi (Kouhen)" (Japanese: 二課の一番長い日（後編）)	Mamoru Oshii	December 10, 1988
Division 2 have made a temporary headquarters at the Shanghai restaurant. It is the second day of the siege, but the rebels have not made any demands yet. Kanuka, disguised as a delivery person from the Shanghai restaurant, asks the mechanics for help. Sakaki tells Kanuka that the police academy has a Patrol Labor prototype they could use. Shige says he overheard one of the rebels say they have a nuclear weapon. Kanuka returns to the restaurant and tells Goto the news. Meanwhile Shinobu has a video conference with the police chiefs. They tell her that the US military will be coming to end the coup before it becomes a civil war, and she should step down. She tells that she will not give into their bluff, and refuses to carry out their orders. The chiefs suspect Goto as he knew about the siege and he was friends with Kiyoteru Kai in college. The police have a warrant out for his arrest. Disgusted by their actions, Shinobu forcibly leaves the conference after an officer attempts to take her into custody. Ohta, Kanuka and Shinshi decide to "raise some hell" with the stolen Police Labor from the academy and a helicopter machine gun that Kanuka borrowed from one of her connections in the US military. They do not get far, and are caught at a JGSDF blockade. The Labor is completely destroyed in the ensuing chaos. Asuma and Noa arrive in Tokyo. Asuma tells Goto that he saw Kai in a restaurant in Hokkaido. Upon hearing the news, Goto thinks he has Kai's plan figured out. Goto asks Matsui to help him. They contact the Maritime Authority who tell them that a ship named the Safflower has been acting suspiciously off the coast. Another ship named the Pacific is in the area too, and judging from US spy photos of the ships, both have missile launchers mounted on them. A short range missile has been stolen from the US military. This means one of the launchers is fake, but which one? Goto calls the ship that Kai is on to try and call his bluff. It does not work, and Kai sends out an ultimatum to the government: dissolve the Diet (the Japanese Government), ban all political parties, and suspend the constitution. If they do not do as he says, he will fire the missile. But Goto has a plan. He enlists the help of the US military and Shinohara Heavy Industries. Will he be able to stop Kai with a submarine and a prototype JGSDF Labor?
7	"Go North, SV2!"; Transliteration: "Tokushatai, Kita e" (Japanese: 特車隊、北へ)	Naoyuki Yoshinaga	June 25, 1989
A truck at a petrol station is stolen, but when the attendant tells a passing policeman, the driver of the truck does not want the police chase after it. The police suspect something fishy is going on and arrest him. He is, in fact, a sympathizer of the terrorist group 'Beach House'. He stole the truck which was carrying a Labor from the Tokyo Labor show. The manufacturer, Shaft Enterprises Europe, is keeping tight-lipped about what exactly is in the truck. The SV2 attempt to capture the truck in front of a tunnel. The truck escapes with the help of the terrorist sympathizer in the Labor, who breaks through the trailer after not being able to get into contact with his friend in the truck. Later, the man who stole the truck drives off the highway only to discover that he is helping a terrorist sympathizer. The theft of the truck from the petrol station was just an opportunistic crime to get a ride home. He is just a seasonal worker, he does not want to be involved in this. But the terrorist persuades the man to help him. Unfortunately for them Shaft will do anything to stop the truck and its contents.

== Patlabor: The TV Series ==
No.	Title	Written by	Original release date	English release date
1	"Ingram Activated"; Transliteration: "Ingram kidō" (Japanese: イングラム起動)	Kazunori Ito	October 11, 1989	August 6, 2001
After Division 2 wrecks its last Labor during an arrest, it is time for an upgrade. Captain Goto sends Asuma and Ohta to the Shinohara Heavy Industries factory in Hachioji to send the old Labor back for repairs. They meet a young police cadet named Noa Izumi who is sitting a Patrol Labor aptitude test. That is if she can find the right building it is being held in. Meanwhile somebody steals the new Patlabor, the AV-98 Ingram and its carrier. Noa certainly is not going to let somebody steal her "pato-chan", and gives chase with Ohta and Asuma following.
2	"Kanuka Has Come"; Transliteration: "Kanuka ga kita!" (Japanese: 香貫花が来た)	Kazunori Ito	October 18, 1989	August 6, 2001
Division 2 are sent to the Police Academy for Ingram Labor training. A woman from the New York Police Department arrives, apparently to train on the labors with Division 2 for the next six months. Her name is Lieutenant Kanuka Clancy, a Japanese-born American woman. The last day of training involves a Labor Combat Tournament that will determine who will pilot both Ingram Patlabors. Is Kanuka vying for a Labor pilot position? With Noa and Kanuka in the final round, will Noa lose her dream to pilot "Alphonse"?
3	"This is SV2"; Transliteration: "Kochira tokusha nika" (Japanese: こちら特車二課)	Mamoru Oshii	November 1, 1989	August 6, 2001
Noa is introduced to life at the SV2. Her initiation involves manually loading her Patlabor onto the carrier, which she almost fails to do. With the hangar for the SV2 being out on a vacant lot in the middle of a piece of reclaimed land virtually in the middle of nowhere, the SV2 has to improvise when dealing with food. When the crew is off duty they fish, raise chickens, grow tomatoes and do the odd spot of weeding. Unfortunately while fishing the mechanics run the police speedboat aground. Ohta goes in to free it, but ends up sinking his Labor. It is up to Noa to pull both the Labor and speedboat out, but Sakaki, the head mechanic, is making an unscheduled trip back to the hangar and is sure to be quite angry at the mess that they have caused. It is up to Division 2 to create some diversions to stall Sakaki.
4	"Head to the Mountain of Mystery!"; Transliteration: "Ma no yama e ike!" (Japanese: 魔の山へ行けっ!)	Kazunori Ito	November 8, 1989	August 6, 2001
A group of hikers find a number of trees knocked over and a damaged Labor in the forest in the mountains. But then they see a large creature, which apparently was the cause of the damage. They report it to the police, but they are rather skeptical since the Labor has now vanished. That is until the mysterious beast returns. The Tokyo Metropolitan Police hand the case over to the SV2. But is it just a Labor in disguise or a real monster? The local police want Division 2 to capture the monster alive so it can be used as a tourist attraction. But with Ohta itching to kill the creature they may have to settle for a stuffed monster.
5	"Runaway Labor X-10!"; Transliteration: "Bōsō reiba X-10!" (Japanese: 暴走レイバーX10(エックステン))	Hiroyuki Hoshiyama	November 15, 1989	August 6, 2001
Division 2 are mysteriously called to the base of Mount Fuji by headquarters, but are given no orders. They are soon given instructions to stop a Labor. Despite the fact that the military try to disguise the Labor by throwing yellow paint on it, It becomes apparent that it is in fact an unmanned experimental military Labor. It is up to Division 2 to stop it as it is programmed to destroy the first city it comes across. But if the military failed to stop it, how can they?
6	"The Tower: SOS"; Transliteration: "Za tawa S.O.S." (Japanese: ザ・タワーSOS)	Naoto Kimura	November 22, 1989	June 11, 2002
A foreign minister is inspecting Tokyo's Tower City Project, a one-kilometer tower under construction, when an explosion and fire breaks out. The SV2 rush to the scene to help out. Unfortunately as the fire department have accidentally had two of their Labors stuck in the only entrance a Labor could fit in, the only way in is to be lowered from a crane above. Not helping matters is Ohta, who decides to use force and almost injures media and rescue crews below with falling debris as well as getting entangled in the wires that was supporting his Labor. If that is not enough, Division 2 is being watched by the international media. Apparently the police chief thinks this might be good public relations if they manage to save the foreign minister. It is now up to Noa rescue the survivors.
7	"Glorious Type 97 Modified"; Transliteration: "Eikō no 97 shikikai" (Japanese: 栄光の97(きゅうなな)式改)	Kazunori Ito	November 29, 1989	June 11, 2002
Division 1 are ready to take on a new prototype Patrol Labor, the SRX-70. Equipped with a 42mm gun, it outclasses the Ingram in every department and proves its worthiness in patrols. Strangely, the company sends its own team of mechanics to service the Labor rather than letting SV2's mechanics service it. Captain Goto smells a rat. Sure enough he finds out with the help of Asuma that the company providing the Labor, Toyohata, is a front for Labor maker Shaft. They want to steal the Labors' pattern movements and data to help develop a military Labor. Captain Nagumo of Division 1 is forced to decide between using the old outdated '97 Patlabors, or the new prototype, which the data from it will most likely be used for military purposes.
8	"Elusive Green"; Transliteration: "Maboroshi no midori" (Japanese: まぼろしの緑)	Naoto Kimura	December 6, 1989	June 11, 2002
Asuma, Hiromi, and Noa are sent by Captain Goto to the village of Onifuri to investigate possible sabotage in the construction of a new highway. They soon discover that there is apparently a sacred tree in the way of the highway that will have to cut down. Villagers say that the demons are protecting the tree and they will be cursed if they move it, but Asuma suspects Labors are involved. Is it just a scam by the land owner to get the government to buy more land off him and forcing them to build the highway around the tree, or is there something more to this curse?
9	"Red Labor Landing"; Transliteration: "Jōriku akai reiba" (Japanese: 上陸 赤いレイバー)	Mamoru Oshii	December 13, 1989	June 11, 2002
Public Safety agents visit the SV2 and ask for help on a case. Itchoku Inubashiri, an ex-military Labor pilot turned terrorist of the militant anti-Babylon project group "Home of the Sea", has injured one of their agents, stolen his gun, and hijacked a taxi to Sakata. They tell Captain Goto that he is going to hijack the Soviet Attack Labor L99, code named Doshka, that will be secretly docking on a boat in Sakata en route back to Russia. Home of the Sea want to steal it to further their cause. The agents need the SV2's help as it involves Labors. Goto smells something fishy with Public Safety's story but lends Noa and Asuma, and tells them they are on a mission to buy Hatahata of all things. It soon becomes apparent that every spy in Japan is in Sakata, and they are not here to buy Hatahata. Is there more to this case than the Public Safety Agents are letting on?
10	"Eve's Trap"; Transliteration: "Ivu no wana" (Japanese: イヴの罠)	Kazunori Ito	December 20, 1989	June 11, 2002
It s Christmas Eve. Kanuka's grandmother has gone missing. She leaves a note to Kanuka saying she is looking for the Christmas of 50 years ago. Fearing the worst, Noa, Asuma and Kanuka search for her, but are called back to duty to the SV2. Detective Matsui has asked the SV2 to help him on a case. Vehicles have been going into the Tokyo Port Tunnel but none have come out, including patrol cars. Also some is trying to disrupt communications around the area. Matsui wants the SV2 to do something before the military get involved. But the military have already been mobilized. Division 1 enter the area but fail to make contact with Division 2 at the agreed time. Noa and Ohta enter the tunnel only to find the remains of Division 1's Labors and not a trace of their crew. Suddenly the Schaft Brocken Labors surround Division 2 and begin to attack.
11	"Eve's Terror"; Transliteration: "Ivu no senritsu" (Japanese: イヴの戦慄)	Kazunori Ito	December 27, 1989	December 3, 2002
Noa fights the Brocken labors, but Kanuka's and Ohta's Labors are defeated. The Phantom Labor has appeared and through the use of Electromagnetic waves causes the Ingrams to cease functioning. The Labor also has a beam weapon which has already destroyed the arm on Ohta's Labor. Ohta is captured and taken away by one of the Brocken Labors. Noa is forced to retreat as she is outnumbered. She soon bumps into Captain Fuwa of the military. Fuwa is on a covert mission to stop the Labors. Ohta soon finds himself in a hotel room locked up with the missing Division 1 members, other police officers and civilians. Meanwhile the remaining members of the SV2 regroup and Captain Goto decides it is time for a new strategy. Goto believes that the head of this operation is hiding nearby and orders the SV2 to find them. Detective Matsui and Shinshi who have been ordered to find Kaunaka's grandmother finally locate her. She tells them that she does not want to see Kanuka die in battle like her husband did in the Korean war, and wants to take her back to Hawaii. Noa goes back into battle helping the military, but soon ends up facing the Phantom Labor alone.
12	"Ohta's One Troubled Afternoon"; Transliteration: "Ota madoi no gogo" (Japanese: 太田 惑いの午後)	Michiko Yokote	January 10, 1990	December 3, 2002
Ohta has been set up to meet a young woman by his Aunt. Ayano Fuji is a beautiful, young woman who is apparently into Labors. After a disastrous first meeting, Ohta is surprised she would like to see him again. Is this the start of a great romance? What does she see in him? As always though, true love never runs smoothly.
13	"Gently, Your Highness"; Transliteration: "Denka oteyawaraka ni" (Japanese: 殿下 お手柔らかに)	Naoto Kimura	January 17, 1990	December 3, 2003
The SV2 are hosts to the young Prince of Oasis, a Middle Eastern country rich in oil. The prince is here to observe how the Patrol Labors work, and hopes to set up something similar in his own country. The prince's presence ruffles a few feathers at the SV2, but the Prince soon takes a shine to Noa and Alphonse, and a friendship soon develops between the two of them. Meanwhile someone has stolen one of the captured Brocken Labors from the Tokyo Port Tunnel case. Could this be connected to the prince's arrival? Is someone out to harm the prince?
14	"You Win!"; Transliteration: "Anta no kachi!" (Japanese: あんたの勝ち!)	Mamoru Oshii	January 24, 1990	December 3, 2003
Division 2 are forced to enter an all Police Judo Tournament and are being beaten quite badly. In the middle of the match they are called to duty. Only problem is Ohta has a sprained ankle, and Asuma cannot even speak. Captain Goto puts Noa under the command of Kanuka. This does not go well. When they are sent out to stop a labor whose operator has gone on a rampage, Noa disobeys Kanuka's orders to shoot the labor and the situation gets out of hand. Noa and Kanuka get on even worse than before after this incident. Captain Goto can see only one solution to bond the team together, take them out to a bar. A drinking competition immediately begins between Noa and Kanuka, and the rest of Division 2 are drunk too. Will Goto's plan really work?
15	"The Whale That Sang a Song"; Transliteration: "Uta wo utatta kujira" (Japanese: 歌を唄ったクジラ)	Michiko Yokote	January 31, 1990	February 11, 2003
A humpback whale enters Tokyo Bay and causes a ruckus in the media and the general public. The bay is polluted and not really fit for a whale to live in. Under public pressure, the government decides to rescue the whale and forms a committee. Division 2 is called in to provide crowd control due to the fact hundreds of onlookers are on the shore of the bay. The rescue committee try several times to lure the whale out into open waters, but it keeps coming back. Why does the whale keeps coming back to the heavily polluted waters of the bay?
16	"The Unit Crosses the Sea"; Transliteration: "Shōtai umi wo wataru" (Japanese: 小隊 海を渡る)	Tetsuko Takahashi	February 7, 1990	February 11, 2003
Division 2 are assigned duties at the Sapporo Snow Festival in Hokkaido. A splinter group of the terrorist group Earth Defense Force is planning to attack the festival. Two Labors have been stolen, so the chances are they will be used in the attack. Apart from the terrorists, the SV2 have to deal with a small child who is making trouble for them. He has just moved from Tokyo where apparently his house was destroyed by a Labor. He used to like Labors, now he hates them. Noa is quite upset that may have been Alphonse that crushed his house.
17	"Target, Chief Goto"; Transliteration: "Mokuhyō ha Gotō taichō" (Japanese: 目標は後藤隊長)	Michiko Yokote	February 14, 1990	February 11, 2003
Out of the blue, Captain Goto begins to receive death threats, somebody tampers with his lunch and he finds cat excrement in his shoes. While he tries to figure out who is after him and why, the rest of Division 2 try to account for his bizarre behavior by testing him out to see what exactly is wrong with him. Things get serious when someone drops a pot plant on Goto's mini-patrol car and one of the SV2's missions is sabotaged when the hydraulics on one the carriers is damaged. Division 2 now know somebody is out to get the Captain, but only Goto figures out who it is, and apparently he has nothing to fear.
18	"I Love Noa-senpai"; Transliteration: "Suki suki Noah senpai" (Japanese: スキスキ野明先輩)	Hibari Arisu	February 21, 1990	February 11, 2003
Idol singer Kana Matsumoto joins the SV2 for a week to learn how to use an Ingram. It is a blatant public relations exercise by the police chiefs, but Noa is a little apprehensive having Kana piloting Alphonse. Everyone else seems delighted to have such a big star staying as the SV2, especially Ohta, who is her number one fan. After Kana almost wrecks Alphonse, she pleads with Noa to train her. Noa does begrudgingly at first, but soon takes the task seriously. A criminal group is out to kidnap Kana, but accidentally kidnap Noa instead. They want to trade her for one of the Ingrams. Division 2 have to sort out this mess before Captain Goto finds out.
19	"Shadow in Geo-Front"; Transliteration: "Jiofuronto no kage" (Japanese: ジオフロントの影)	Yutaka Izubuchi	February 28, 1990	May 13, 2003
Workers on the underground Tokyo Geo-City Project uncover a series of limestone caverns. However, one of the workers is a member of the Earth Defense Army, militant anti-Project Babylon terrorist group. He has set off a bomb and threatens to set off more in an aim to destroy the project. The SV2 are called in to help. Noa along with Kanuka who has anti-terrorist and bomb disposal training, set off in their Labors to defuse the bombs and apprehend the criminal. While searching for the bombs they come across a large creature in the water which attacks them. Meanwhile Captain Goto manages to apprehend the criminal. He discovers that he has set up a large bomb near the ocean entrance of Tokyo Geo-City that will cause the whole area to be flooded. Division 2 has lost contact with Noa and Kanuka and they cannot tell them about the bomb. Meanwhile Kanuka and Noa have their hands full trying to get away from a monster that keeps attacking them.
20	"Movement in the Dark"; Transliteration: "Kuroi taidō" (Japanese: 黒い胎動)	Kazunori Ito	March 7, 1990	May 13, 2003
Private security firms have started to use Labors in security work. One of these firms is Holly Security Services, who have been invited to test out their new Labor the Saturn (formerly Schaft's SRX-70) against the Self-Defence Force. But Holly Security Services (HSS) is actually another front for Shaft. Kurosaki is here incognito as a negotiator for HSS to test out the new version of the Phantom, providing him the perfect alibi. Destruction of a military Labor by the Phantom Labor hits the front page of every newspaper. Meanwhile, at the SV2, the spare Labor is going back to the factory for improvements. Jitsuyama is on hand to pick up the Labor, and suggests Asuma should visit his father. Asuma is a little upset with this and walks away in a bad mood. Noa tries to talk with Asuma about it, but he will not open up and this causes a major fight between the two of them. Meanwhile the Phantom Labor appears off the coast of Oshima. Captain Fuwa of the military is called in again to fight the Labor covertly. Division are ordered to take on the Labor, even though Captain Goto knows the who thing has been set up to provide battle data for the Phantom Labor. Before heading off to Oshima, Goto sends Asuma to the factory to pick up the Labor. He will not be there to help Noa. Noa is quite upset at the fact she has not patched things up with him yet, and that he will not be there.
21	"Phantom Again"; Transliteration: "Bōrei futatabi" (Japanese: 亡霊(ファントム)ふたたび)	Kazunori Ito	March 14, 1990	May 13, 2003
The Phantom Labor lands and is heading towards Sashiki. It has already destroyed one of the Holly Security Services Labors. Captain Fuwa and her military Labor team plan to lure the Phantom Labor into the military training grounds to destroy it. Division 2 arrive, but are ordered not to get involved, if at all possible. As Captain Fuwa's team are dropped from a military plane they are immediately attacked by the Phantom Labor's beam weapon, even before they land. One of the Labors is damaged but they still continue on with their plan. Kanuka decides that they should be the ones leading the Phantom Labor into the training ground. The plan certainly works but Ohta is attacked and is severely beaten. Captain Fuwa manages to save Ohta by forcing the Phantom Labor away. Ohta notices that there is a second armed Labor lurking around helping it. Meanwhile Kurosaki decides that he needs more battle data. He instructs his team to get the Phantom Labor to steal Noa's movement disc at any cost. Noa is now the sole target of the Phantom labor. She has to fight it alone without any backup. Even if she does win she still may have to deal with the second Labor.
22	"Labor and Flower"; Transliteration: "Hana to reiba" (Japanese: 花とレイバー)	Michiko Yokote	March 21, 1990	May 13, 2003
The Tokyo Metropolitan Police are holding a Public Safety Awareness Week. Division 2 are holding a seminar on Labor safety when a Yakuza boss decides to take an interest in what they are doing. He introduces himself to Noa and Kanuka. Are the Yakuza trying to intimidate them? But he seems quite friendly and even invites them to his house to show off his Labor collection. All he wants to know is how set the defaults on his Labors so he can use them. Noa shows him but is a little concerned. He rewards the SV2 with gifts, but for a police unit to receive gifts from a Yakuza boss, well that is dangerous. The relationship begins to get a bit stronger, and the boss becomes so enthralled with piloting Labors he decides to do help out the SV2. The Yakuza are now helping to stop crime. Trouble brews when a rival Yakuza boss gets jealous and wants a piece of the action. This could lead to a gang war. Noa and Kanuka must stop them before blood is shed.
23	"Kanuka's Report"; Transliteration: "Kanuka repōto" (Japanese: 香貫花レポート)	Hibari Arisu; Naoyuki Yoshinaga	April 4, 1990	August 12, 2003
Kanuka's stay with the SV2 is up. She must now return to the New York Police Department. She explicitly states she does not want a farewell party. However, several members of Division 2 have other ideas. They break into her apartment to give her a surprise party. But Shinshi accidentally discovers a report she has been working on for the NYPD. It is a report on Division 2 and there is a dossier on every member. The report, however, does not give Division 2 a good review—far from it. Eventually when they reach Ohta's dossier, it is so bad he practically destroys the lounge room and the computer, and Kanuka is due back any minute. This is somewhat of a clip episode, but with mostly new material. (Kanuka's portable computer is modeled after the Apple's Macintosh Portable; the only notable difference is the color: black instead of white.)
24	"Farewell Kanuka"; Transliteration: "Saraba Kanuka" (Japanese: さらば香貫花)	Kazunori Ito	April 11, 1990	August 12, 2003
Kanuka is finally heading back to New York. The team feel like they have disgraced themselves so Noa is the only one there to see her off. Before the plane takes off a strange man (who looks like a cat) named Ginji Nekowatari enters the cockpit and tells the pilot that he has a bomb on board. He demands the release of one of the "Home of the Sea" terrorists currently in custody. Kanuka has had to check her gun in with the pilot before she boarded. She decides to disguise herself as an air hostess to get closer to the terrorist and move freely about the plane. Although it probably will not take much to fool this terrorist.
25	"Storm of Spring"; Transliteration: "Haru no arashi" (Japanese: 春の嵐)	Michiko Yokote	April 18, 1990	August 12, 2003
With the departure of Kanuka, Shinshi has been given the unenviable job of being Ohta's backup. Things are not going well. Shinshi just cannot control him and he will not listen to any of his orders. Maybe he is not cut out for this work. An opportunity comes up for him to return to his old line of work; computer programming. The job sounds good, he will get three times more than what he is getting now and he will be the head of his own department. But can he turn his back on his colleagues, his job and resign from the police force?
26	"I'm Takeo Kumagami"; Transliteration: "Watashi ga Kumagami Takeo desu" (Japanese: 私が熊耳武緒です)	Michiko Yokote	April 25, 1990	August 12, 2003
A new member is about to join Division 2. Her Name is Takeo Kumagami. She is an excellent cop, good at cooking, a great typist, great with computers, has mastered the basic pattern movements of the Ingram in less than a day and was even scouted by Interpol but turned the offer down. Why on Earth is she here at the SV2? Captain Goto is thinking of changing some of the positions in his team. Is Kumagami trying to take Noa's position? Will changing the team be a problem for morale?
27	"A Calling Voice in the Dark"; Transliteration: "Yami ni yobu koe" (Japanese: 闇に呼ぶ声)	Kazunori Ito	May 2, 1990	January 13, 2004
Division 2 are out on a training mission at a group of abandoned buildings set for demolition. They are training for urban combat and hostage situations. Everything seems to be going fine until the nightshift comes. Local residents claim that the buildings are haunted. Voices can be heard at night and a ghostly group of samurai can sometime be seen. Shinshi discovers that disaster and death have always befell the area, with many deaths due to earthquakes, especially the big one which happened four years prior. One night Captain Goto's computer malfunctions and the word "Help!" scrolls across his screen continually. Then he is attacked by a man with a sword who vanishes! Later, Ohta feels someone "tugging" at his Labor and Noa sees a ghostly vision of a young boy. Are these mysterious occurrences the work of spirits? Is the site cursed?
28	"Suspicious Duo"; Transliteration: "Ayashii futari" (Japanese: 怪しいふたり)	Kazunori Ito	May 9, 1990	January 13, 2004
On their day off, Noa and Asuma head out to the city and end up in a game arcade. Asuma spots a Patlabor game, but both he and Noa are beaten by it. A man named Utsumi shows up claiming his company created the game and then proceeds to clear all the levels. Noa decides she will not be beaten and tries again, and fails. A young boy named Bud shows up and says he will avenge Noa. Noa cannot believe even a kid is better at this game than she is. Utsumi and Bud are actually employees of Schaft. They are getting ready to make their next move. Utsumi and Kurosaki are heading up the Griffin project. An experimental Labor with battle capabilities higher than most military Labors. The Labor has been created to develop components for other Labors. The first part of their plan involves testing out Division 2. Utsumi sends out a Saturn Labor to cause havoc on a construction site hoping that Division 2 will show up.
29	"SV2 Wiped Out!"; Transliteration: "Tokusha nika kaimetsu su!" (Japanese: 特車二課 壊滅す!)	Mamoru Oshii	May 23, 1990	January 13, 2004
With the SV2 hangars being out in the middle of an isolated reclaimed landfill, getting food has always been a problem. The Shanghai Restaurant is the only place that will deliver to them. In what should have been a typical order, the food does not arrive and the delivery boy has disappeared with the order. Ohta rings the restaurant to complain and ends up insulting them. Eventually the hunger gets to them and Ohta is forced to apologise. But the restaurant now says it does not want to go out at night because of the stray dogs that live on the reclaimed land and that there is no one to deliver the food. Fed up after waiting hours and hours, Ohta says he will provide an escort for the restaurant but he does not return. A few hours later the mechanics take off to find Ohta, but they also do not return. Where have they gone and why do they not return?
30	"Griffin was Here!"; Transliteration: "Gurifon sanjō!" (Japanese: グリフォン参上!)	Kazunori Ito	May 30, 1990	January 13, 2004
The mysterious black Labor attacks Fuwa's military team, ripping out her Labor's movement disc and stealing it. The attacker leaves a message written in the sand: "The Griffin has Arrived". The Schaft team is delighted with the results, although some think that Bud is a dangerous pilot who takes too many risks. Utsumi now wants to take on Division 2 so that he can capture an Ingram's disc to study it and for its movement data. Shinobu meets her old friend Fuwa for a meal. Captain Fuwa takes the opportunity to ask Shinobu if she knows anything about a Labor called the Griffin that can mimic human movement. Meanwhile news comes through that the police chief is thinking of creating two new divisions, but all four divisions would get new economy Ingrams developed by Shinohara Heavy Industries. This means Division 2's old Ingrams would have to be replaced, which displeases Noa. Captain Goto is not too sure this is a good idea. Will the new Labors be worse than the current ones? There is only one place to find out—the Tokyo International Labor Show.
31	"Tragedy in Rain"; Transliteration: "Ame no sangeki" (Japanese: 雨の惨劇)	Satoshi Namiki	June 6, 1990	April 6, 2004
Division 2 are on hand to provide security at the Tokyo International Labor Show. Utsumi and Bud meet Noa and Asuma again while looking at the new Economy Ingram. Utsumi realizes for the first time that they are from Division 2. Bud and Utsumi are actually there to plot their attack on them. Asuma decides to test the new Ingram without telling Captain Goto, borrowing Noa's movement disc from Ingram 1. Ohta unhappy at the situation decides to challenge him with his Ingram 2. Suddenly, a truck interrupts them violently and gas starts pouring out creating a smoke screen. The Griffin Labor smashes out of the truck and starts attacking Ohta. Noa is unable to help him as Asuma is using her movement disc in the Economy Ingram. Both Ingram Labors are defeated and an injured Asuma manages to give the disc back to Noa. The Griffin attempts to take Ohta's movement disc, but Noa begins to fight. Rain causes the smoke screen to disperse and Bud is given orders to retreat. To everyone's amazement the Griffin Labor takes off and flies like a jet. Meanwhile Kumagami sees a car nearby and asks them to leave the area. Inside is Utsumi who is giving Bud directions via radio. Kumagami recognizes Utsumi as Richard Wong. The driver panics and shoots Kumagami, fleeing from the scene.
32	"Reunion"; Transliteration: "Saikai" (Japanese: 再会)	Kazunori Ito	June 13, 1990	April 6, 2004
The members of the SV2 discuss yesterday's events. How could the Labor fly, and who has manufactured it? At least they have demonstrated to headquarters that the Economy Ingram is not good enough for police work, and thankfully Asuma and Kumagami are both in a satisfactory condition in the hospital. Meanwhile, the remains of the Griffin are found in the Chiba Mountains. In reality, Schaft have faked the crash landing and destruction of the Labor, and have taken Bud and the Griffin to a safe place. Kumagami gives Detective Matsui a description of Richard Wong for a police sketch. Asuma who is visiting Kumagami's room sees the picture and identifies him as Utsumi. Asuma suddenly makes the connection between him, Schaft and the Griffin. Matsui goes to Schaft to talk to Utsumi. The manager finds out the police are after Utsumi and immediately orders the cancellation of the project. But he knows that Utsumi will not give up without a fight and calls in Schaft Security Systems, or SSS for short. They are essentially a private army for Schaft, and have a bad reputation for getting things done no matter the cost. With Three-S coming to Japan, Kanuka returns to the SV2 to investigate why they are involved. With Asuma out of action for a while, Kanuka becomes Noa's backup.
33	"Hounds of SCHAFT"; Transliteration: "Shafuto no inu tachi" (Japanese: シャフトの犬たち)	Kazunori Ito	June 20, 1990	April 6, 2004
Utsumi and Kurosaki are cornered by Three-S, but escape with the Griffin. The division manager of Schaft orders Three-S to capture them. Captain Goto discovers that the crash was faked, and the Griffin Labor is still out there somewhere. Noa is upset at the news. She does not want to fight it. After Three-S tracks Utsumi down, he decides to take the Griffin and flees to Tokyo to show what it can do. Matsui is in pursuit and tells Goto that they will be entering by ship through the "Castle Gate", the entrance to the Babylon Project. Three-S know this too and plan to stop Utsumi there. Division 2 plan to head Three-S off before they get a chance to attack. Unfortunately Ohta's Ingram is still out of commission, so Noa will have to go alone.
34	"The Battle of the Gate"; Transliteration: "Jōmon no tatakai" (Japanese: 城門の戦い)	Kazunori Ito	June 27, 1990	April 6, 2004
The Griffin lands on the far side away from where Division 2 are, and they have race to the other side. Meanwhile Three-S attempt to ambush the Griffin but several of their Labors are destroyed. Asuma, who has been discharged from hospital, watches the events on TV and tries to find a way to get to the scene. He has been ordered not to go. Sasaki decides he can come with him to deliver a backup battery by helicopter. Noa goes in to attack but Momoko Sakuryama's TV crew arrive and she cannot take a shot at the Griffin because they are in the way. Three-S decide to blow up the Griffin by getting one of its Labors to attach explosives to it. The Griffin attacks Noa, she responds by hitting it with her shotgun, which goes off and almost hits her. The battle between Noa and the Griffin continues. Kanuka eventually removes Momoko and her crew so that Noa can shoot the Griffin. She shoots and the Griffin dodges and the bullets hits the Three-S Labor carrying the explosives, causing an explosion that knocks both Noa and Griffin out.
35	"Griffin Down"; Transliteration: "Gurifon otsu" (Japanese: グリフォン墜つ)	Kazunori Ito	July 4, 1990	July 6, 2004
The fight continues, and Noa manages to backflip the Griffin. By now the Griffin is starting to malfunction. It is still putting up a fight though, smashing Noa's main camera. Ohta tries to help Noa by firing his Labor gun with the help of Yamazaki, and manages to shoot out its main camera. Both machines are heavily damaged, and the fight will probably not go on for much longer. Utsumi orders Bud to escape. The Griffin flies off but crashes in Tokyo Bay. Bud is saved; however, the Griffin sinks to the bottom of the ocean. Asuma, who has been giving instructions to Noa all this time, rushes over to Noa's battered Ingram to see her crying inside. Utsumi cuts a deal with Schaft to avoid having Three-S chase him, and escapes Japan with Bud. Though Kanuka's investigation is unresolved, it is over for now, and she bids the SV2 farewell again.
36	"Noa's Adventure"; Transliteration: "Noa no bōken" (Japanese: 野明の冒険)	Satoshi Namiki	July 11, 1990	July 6, 2004
Division 2 return to the Police Academy to hone their fighting skills. Noa is getting a little depressed at the fact Ohta is much better than her, and she is not getting much credit for her work. One night she sets off to get dinner for everyone, and sees a few ¥10,000 notes floating down a stream. She sees this as a big chance to prove herself and follows the trail of money upstream. Noa does not return to the Training Grounds, and the team are worried. They come across a local policeman who tells them a robbery has taken place. This behavior is quite unlike her and Division 2 are now quite worried and begin to search for her.
37	"Safety on Sales"; Transliteration: "Anshin uri masu" (Japanese: 安心売ります)	Satoshi Namiki	July 18, 1990	July 6, 2004
After Ohta damages a number of cars on a call-out, the SV2's insurance company sends in an investigator to check up on the SV2 due to their high number of claims. Naoyo Yamada, a middle-aged woman from the insurance company asks Division to re-create the crime. After the re-creation, she still cannot decide if they should have their insurance renewed or not, so she decides to stay until their next mission. Though they apprehend the criminal without any damage, the clean-up is a total disaster. Ohta is ordered to move the criminal's truck, but in the process causes several cars to have an accident which in turn cause a massive pile up. Then Ohta accidentally crushes a child's bike. Will the SV2 be running without insurance, or is there hope yet?
38	"Underground Labyrinth Case"; Transliteration: "Chika meikyūbukken" (Japanese: 地下迷宮物件)	Mamoru Oshii	July 25, 1990	July 6, 2004
Mysterious things have been happening at the SV2. Food and alcohol have been disappearing over the time. One night somebody steals two of the chickens. This causes fights amongst mechanics, some even blame each other. But who is the culprit? Nightly patrols commence and a man is discovered running from the greenhouse that hoses the tomato plants. The entire SV2 gives chase, but he mysteriously disappears. Morning brings the discovery of a manhole. Apparently there is a maze of tunnels underneath the landfill that was used to transport material for the site many years ago. They were abandoned long ago and thought to be disused, but the criminal is using the tunnels to escape. Ohta and Shinshi are sent down to find him, but after several hours they fail to make contact. The rest of Division 2 follow, but are having a difficult time with all the cats and rats down there, and also the fact they are completely lost. But to add to their woes there is something else lurking down in the water.
39	"Mass Production Plan"; Transliteration: "Ryōsanki keikaku" (Japanese: 量産機計画)	Satoshi Namiki	August 1, 1990	March 8, 2005
Shinohara Heavy Industries completes a new prototype version of the Economy Ingram. Noa, Gomika and Ohta are sent to help test it out and give feedback to the engineers. Noa gives the now model a fairly average score, to which Ohta accuses her of bias, because she seems to love the Ingram so much. But it seems to be an improvement over the Ingram in some ways, but needs some improvement. Jitsuyama, who is heading up the project, implements the changes and all three notice the results straight away, even though Noa is still quite skeptical. Shinohara Heavy Industries are pleased with the results. They are so confident that they suggest that they should have a mock fight between the prototype Labor and the Ingram. Noa is chosen to battle the new Economy Ingram much to Ohta's disappointment.
40	"Shore Watch Out Order"; Transliteration: "Engan keibi meirei" (Japanese: 沿岸警備命令)	Shigeyoshi Sugama	August 8, 1990	March 8, 2005
Near a shrine on the coastal village of Shikura, a fishing boat has an accident and catches fire. The locals claim a sea monster named Plessie is behind it all. The coast guard order Division 2 to look into the matter. Soon the media get involved (including Momoko Sakurayama), and tourists start coming to the area in hope of catching a glimpse of the monster. The locals, however, seem to be rather well prepared for this onslaught of tourists. Is it all just a hoax to get the tourist buck?
41	"Save the Terrorists"; Transliteration: "Terorisuto wo sukue" (Japanese: テロリストを救え)	Satoshi Namiki	August 15, 1990	March 8, 2005
Division 2 are on hand to provide security at a hotel near the airport for the Babylon Project Development Convention, an obvious target for terrorists. Goto sees two men running down a hallway with a duffel bag after being found hiding in the toilet. Goto and police officers try to stop them but they get in an elevator headed to the top of the building. The two bumbling terrorists set off the bomb they are carrying, blowing up a part of the panoramic restaurant on the top of the building, making it unstable. Both Division 2 Labors are sent up to arrest the terrorists, but they have taken the barman as hostage. One of the men threatens Division 2 with a stick of dynamite, only to have it explode, making the restaurant platform extremely unstable. Goto is informed that there is a fuel pipe from to the airport under the street directly in front of the hotel and below the tumbling restaurant, which could cause a massive explosion if it collapsed. Noa and Ohta have to stop the restaurant from toppling while trying to save the barman and the terrorists.
42	"Return of the Men"; Transliteration: "Kaette kita otoko tachi" (Japanese: 帰ってきた男たち)	Michiko Yokote	August 22, 1990	March 8, 2005
Captain Goto and Police Chief Fukushima are investigating robberies of Automatic Teller Machines. It is obvious that Labors have been used in these crimes. Strange graffiti is left in chalk at the scene of each crime. Goto believes there is a connection to previous incidents. He also discovers that the same Home of the Sea terrorists they have dealt with before could be behind these robberies. The SV2 must stop the criminals before they strike again.
43	"Working Ladies"; Transliteration: "Hataraku ojōsan" (Japanese: はたらくお嬢さん)	Hibari Arisu; Tetsuko Takahashi	August 29, 1990	August 9, 2005
Under Chief Fukushima's orders, Division 2 is forced to appear on Momoko Sakurayama's TV show The Working Girl, focused on women in the workplace, and Noa will be the next subject. Fukushima believes it will be great PR for Division 2. Everything seems to be going well until Division 2 are called out to stop a man from committing suicide. He threatens to crash his Labor into a fuel depot. Momoko decides to stand between Division 2 and the criminal to do her report, and she is taken hostage by the Labor. It is up to Noa to save her, otherwise it will be another press disaster for Division 2.
44	"CLAT Forever"; Transliteration: "CLAT yo eien ni" (Japanese: CLATよ永遠に)	Kazunori Ito	September 5, 1990	August 9, 2005
Shigeo the mechanic has been sent to train with the New York City Police Labor Division. Once he gets in New York, he insults a cab driver, who tries to shoot him with a machine gun. Kanuka saves him by shooting the cab with a bazooka. Things get weirder when he gets to the labor hangar; The NY Police Labor headquarters is a secret underground base under the Hudson. The team are called Crime Labor Attack Team, or CLAT for short, and the members look strikingly familiar to a certain police Labor team in Japan.
45	"Freedom to Choose a Job"; Transliteration: "Shokugyōsentaku no jiyū" (Japanese: 職業選択の自由)	Michiko Yokote	September 12, 1990	August 9, 2005
The SV2 are invited to see a public military demonstration by Captain Fuwa's air-drop Labor team. They are even given a guided tour of the Labors hangars by one of her subordinates. Noa takes an interest in the Helldiver, a top-of-the-line military Labor. Fuwa notices, and offers Noa the chance to take it out for a run. The military is looking for pilots, and Fuwa sees potential in Noa. She gives her the manuals for the Helldiver, and asks to meet again with her. Noa is quite interested, but does she really want to leave her friends and colleagues at the SV2? A mistake on a mission has her seriously considering the job offer.
46	"Its Name, Zero"; Transliteration: "Sono na wa zero" (Japanese: その名はゼロ)	Kazunori Ito	September 19, 1990	August 9, 2005
Division 1 are finally getting a new Labor; the Shinohara AV-Zero. After a mock fight with Ohta in his Ingram, and Gomika in the new Zero, everyone is impressed with the new Labor. With its neural network, it can automatically dodge debris on the ground. There is much discussion about how much the new machine has outclassed the Ingrams. Later Division 2 are sent out to stop a rampaging Labor. It walks through an open-plan shopping mall, but Noa manages to stop it in a car park without causing major damage. However, a VIP's car was apparently scratched in the incident, and he has complained to the Police Chief. The members of Division 2 discuss what happened and are little concerned as this could mean reorganisation for the SV2. Noa is upset at what has been said and locks herself in Alphonse's cockpit.
47	"Condition Green"; Transliteration: "Kondeishon gurīn" (Japanese: コンディション・グリーン)	Kazunori Ito	September 26, 1990	August 9, 2005
The media shower praise on Division 1. The Zero Labor is a complete success and a hit with the public. Division 2's confidence is severely shaken. Noa goes home to her parents in Hokkaido to escape her problems. Asuma who is worried about her, goes to cheer her up and persuade her to come back to Tokyo. Asuma and Noa arrive back, only to be immediately mobilised. A terrorist is hiding in a fuel depot. With both Division 1 and 2 at the scene, will the Zero find the terrorist Labor first, or will an Ingram? Noa is absolutely determined to prove her worth as a policewoman.

== Patlabor: The New Files ==
The episodes were released as OVAs alongside the TV series on LaserDisc and VHS from Bandai Visual from November 22, 1990, to June 6, 1992. They were later released on DVD on August 25, 2000, and on Blu-ray on September 24, 2010. Central Park Media licensed the New Files series and released them on to subtitled VHS under the U.S. Manga Corps label. They later released one DVD volume with English audio before releasing a box set containing all 16 episodes. Only four episodes of the series were dubbed, the rest were subtitled only. Maiden Japan has licensed the OVA series and re-released on Blu-ray and DVD on February 17, 2015.

No.	Title	Written by	Original release date
1	"Griffin Resurrected" "Gurifon fukkatsu" (グリフォン復活)	Kazunori Ito	November 22, 1990
It is 30 December 1999. Utsumi and Bud have returned to Japan to challenge the SV2 again, and sell their team's services in the format of the Griffin. At the SV2, the AV-Zero is going through its paces. It has been improved and is now much faster. Kanuka has returned to Japan to visit her grandmother and has dropped by to visit her former colleagues at the SV2. Detective Matsui discovers that several top Labor specialists are in town and informs Captain Goto of his findings. Meanwhile, Momoko Sakurayama receives a tip-off that several arms dealers are also in Tokyo. She informs Kumagami, who in turn tells Captain Goto. Something big is going to happen. That night the Griffin Labor returns. Division 2 was previously called out to a fire, so Division 1 is called in to deal with the Labor. Bud soon figures out the Zero's weakness: it is programmed to stop near buildings to avoid damage. He takes full advantage of this and defeats both Patlabors.
2	"A Bad Day" "Saiyaku no hi" (災厄の日)	Michiko Yokote	December 25, 1990
Noa wakes up to discover she has a toothache. But some members of the team think it is more than that, especially when Asuma has been teasing her about her wisdom teeth all morning. The team force Asuma to apologize, but that just makes things worse, especially when there was no apparent reason to apologize. Shinshi gives Noa painkillers to ease the pain, but unfortunately she takes them all at once causing her to sleep most of the morning. Later in the afternoon, Division 2 are suddenly called out to an incident where a stolen Labor is running amok in a forest. Only problem is that every time Noa takes a step in her Ingram, her tooth hurts like mad.
3	"Schaft's Counterattack" "Gyakushū no shafuto" (逆襲のシャフト!)	Kazunori Ito	January 24, 1991
The remains of Division 1's Labors return to the hangar. Noa is somewhat scared of the prospect of having to fight the Griffin again, but Asuma assures her that she can defeat it. Meanwhile Schaft's section chief is livid at Utsumi's actions. Goto asks Kumagami about her relationship with Utsumi. She tells him it is none of his business. Bud leaves the ship where the Griffin is being hidden to visit the SV2. He does not go into the hangar to meet them, and stops at the gate because he is worried that Goto might spot him. He is later chewed out by Utsumi because of his actions. Kurosaki notices that Bud is becoming more dangerous and secretly orders to place a bomb on the Griffin without Utsumi's knowledge. If it looks like the Griffin will be captured Kurosaki will destroy the Griffin and Bud. Matsui notices that the labor specialists are on the move. They are in fact being taken on a bus en route to the Griffin Labor's next show. Utsumi notices Matsui trailing the bus and manages to give him the slip. The Griffin appears that night, 31 December 1999, and Division 2 are mobilized. Meanwhile Kanuka is taking her grandmother on a trip. On the train she overhears a news report about the Griffin surfacing again in Tokyo bay. Her grandmother senses her anxiety and tells her to go and that she will be fine by herself.
4	"90% Viewer Rate" "Shichō ritsu 90 %" (視聴率90%)	Hibari Arisu	February 21, 1991
The children's TV program Together With Mother has finally been axed after 20 years, and is about to begin its final broadcast. Unfortunately, one of the cast members, Kumagoro, a man in a bear suit, has decided to take the rest of cast hostage by grabbing them with a small a Labor. He demands ¥300,000,000 and a helicopter or he'll blow up the cast. To prove his claims, he sets off a car bomb in the parking lot. Division 2 are called in, but the producers of the show seem to want to prolong the situation in order to get higher ratings. Kumagami and Noa enter the studio disguised as waitresses in order to free the hostages, but the plan does not go well. The riot police are called in after Division 2's failure, but Goto thinks they'll just inflame the situation more. However, Goto does have a plan which is so bizarre it might just work.
5	"The Greatest Showdown in History" "Shijō saidai no kessen" (史上最大の決戦)	Kazunori Ito	April 25, 1991
The Griffin is ready to fight Division 2. Momoko Sakurayama races to the scene, but a traffic jam is holding them up. She decides she can wait no longer, and runs to the scene without her camera crew. Meanwhile, the Ingrams face off the Griffin across a bridge. In the ensuing battle, the Griffin escapes off the bridge into the water and Ota shoots a hole into the bridge with the shotgun in an attempt to hit it. But the Griffin pulls Ota's Labor down through the hole. Ota manages to escape, but his Labor is at the bottom of the bay. Kanuka returns to the SV2 hangar to retrieve Unit 3. She is determined to help her comrades, but will she make it to them in time? Momoko finally arrives at the scene to report on the action, but Goto and Kamagumi have other plans for her and her camera crew. They ask her to film the windows of the hotel where the fight is taking place. Goto believes that the Labor specialists are watching the show inside the hotel. He wants to be able to identify them. Utsumi orders Bud to fight Noa. Bud smashes Noa's Ingram back onto its carrier. Noa's Labor is flat on its back, and Bud is coming in for the final blow. Worse yet is the fact her battery is running out.
6	"Black Trinary" "Kuroi sarensē" (黒い三連星)	Mamoru Oshii	May 23, 1991
After the hot water system (a 40-gallon drum attached to propane tank) at the SV2 literally blows up, Division 2 is forced to go to a bath house to wash themselves. Upon driving to the bath house, they come across a man lying unconscious in the street. He identifies himself as a policeman. He has been tracking down a terrorist who has been responsible for several bombings of businesses with contracts with the Babylon Project. He found the terrorist, but was knocked out by him before he could be arrested. Before the police officer passes out, he tells them the terrorist can be identified by three moles under his right arm. None of the team saw anybody pass the van they were driving in, so he must have headed in the other direction: a dead-end street with the bath house at the end of it. The men of Division 2 decide to arrest the culprit and enter the bath house. The only problem is that most of the suspects look like Yakuza members, and who in their right mind would attempt to look under their armpits?
7	"Game Over"	Kazunori Ito	June 23, 1991
Noa is not moving, so Hiromi moves his carrier back, out of reach of the Griffin. Meanwhile Shinshi rams the Griffin with his carrier to enable Hiromi and Noa to escape. Noa's Labor is now totally out of power. She needs to recharge her batteries fast. Unfortunately, the Griffin has gotten past Shinshi, who tries to block it, but feels the Griffin's wrath for his trouble. The Griffin runs after the escaping carrier, but Kanuka arrives in the nick of time and starts fighting it. Sakaki has also arrived in machine 3's carrier with a new set of batteries for Noa. Kanuka needs to hold off the Griffin until Noa can change her batteries. Unfortunately, Kanuka is severely beaten and has her Labor's arm ripped off. While most of Tokyo celebrates the first moments of the new year, Noa goes back into battle, but Bud announces through the external speakers of the Griffin that he is finally going to fight his "big sister" (a term of affection – he is not really her brother). Noa is absolutely shocked. She realizes that the young boy she met at the arcade is actually piloting the Griffin. Kanuka tries to shoot the Griffin, but Noa tries to stop her and explain who is in the cockpit of the Griffin. Kurosaki decides that now might be a good time to use the bomb on board the Griffin. Utsumi tells him that he knew about it and that he is already removed it. Both of them decide that the game is over and leave disguised as hotel staff. Meanwhile Kumagami has been trying track down Utsumi inside the hotel. She confronts him, and we discover the nature of their former relationship. Utsumi tells her that he wants to turn himself in. He tricks her when they embrace, and he throws her in a large laundry hamper and escapes. Meanwhile Bud and Noa continue fighting, while trading insults through their external speakers. Noa manages to get the upper hand and pile-dives the Griffin and arrests Bud. Kurosaki and Utsumi escape the police roadblocks. Utsumi tells Kurosaki that in fact he did leave the bomb on the Griffin, and presses the detonation button as they drive off and flee from the scene. Division 2 notice the bomb in time, and Kanuka manages to throw the Griffin into the bay before it explodes. Later, Bud is deported back to India. Kumagami decides to give away the watch Utsumi gave her when they were lovers, to Shige.
8	"The Seven Days of Fire" "Hi no nana nichikan" (火の七日間)	Mamoru Oshii	July 25, 1991
Ota has yet again totaled his Ingram in the line of duty. Sakaki orders the mechanics to fix the labor overnight. Shige tells him that they cannot do it and have been working non-stop, and will probably need a night off. Sakaki is sympathetic to their plight and checks up on the sleeping mechanics. However he finds tons and tons of pornographic magazines and videos in their possession. Enraged, he publicly burns the lot and instigates new rules, banning many popular pastimes such as fishing, and leaving little of a private life. The mechanics are upset and Shige decides to talk to Sakaki. Before he can get a word out, Sakaki tells him that he may be retiring soon, and that Shige will eventually be head mechanic. Sakaki tells him that he will have to look after the mechanics and discipline them. Shige takes this talk the wrong way, and forms a force to weed out mechanics who break the rules. This causes the mechanics to revolt, but some do not agree and splinter groups form. Kidnappings and beatings of other mechanics begin. Though the ruckus does not affect their work, Sakaki must do something to regain control.
9	"VS (Versus)" "VS (Bāsasu)" (VS (バーサス))	Michiko Yokote	August 22, 1991
Captain Goto treats all of Division 2 to a break at hot spring. Things seem to be going well until Kumagumi tells Kanuka that she has put away the underwear she left in the change room. Kanuka is quite angry at Kumagami. She finds it an invasion of privacy. This causes them to argue with each other. The other members try to stop them from fighting, but it only causes them to argue even more. Division 2 give up trying, so they decide to drink themselves into a stupor and try to forget about it. The arguing only gets worse with more alcohol. Meanwhile Captain Goto escapes and decides to call Shinobu just to get away from them.
10	"It's Called Amnesia" "Sono na wa amunejia" (その名はアムネジア)	Mamoru Oshii	September 26, 1991
Ota has a strange dream where he kills his team mates who have all become criminals. He wakes up to find himself in Shinshi's house where Hiromi, Asuma, Shinshi, and Shige are dead from gun wounds, and Ota is holding a gun in his hand. He runs screaming from the house, but he soon cannot remember who he is. Did he kill all those people? He looks in his wallet and because he has Shinshi's wallet, he believes he is Shinshi. Meanwhile the SV2 search for Ota. Goto believes he has amnesia. They must find him before he hurts someone else or himself.
11	"The Day Goma Came in from the Rain" "Ame no hi ni ki ta goma" (雨の日に来たゴマ)	Kazunori Ito	November 21, 1991
While riding back to the hangar in the rain, Noa spots a cardboard box near the gate. Inside is a small kitten that was abandoned by someone. She sneaks it inside and asks Hiromi to help care for it. He says it is weak and might die, but Noa is determined to help it survive. Being called out to Labor incidents does not really help, so she asks Asuma to talk Shige into helping while they're called out to crime scenes. The kitten survives and is doing well. Unfortunately, it looks like Captain Goto might know, and it is getting harder and harder to keep it under wraps. During cleaning of the hangar, the kitten escapes and nobody can find it. Division 2 are called out to a crime and Noa discovers the kitten sitting in the cockpit of Alphonse. Unfortunately, it wants to play and causes Noa to lose control of her Ingram.
12	"Our Karuizawa" "Futari no karuizawa" (二人の軽井沢)	Kazunori Ito	December 19, 1991
Goto and Shinobu are returning from a conference in Karuizawa. Shinobu has sprained her ankle by falling down the stairs as she left and Goto has had to drive her back. Unfortunately, a typhoon is headed for Tokyo and they end up in the middle of the storm. Every way they turn there are traffic jams and road closures. Shinobu refuses to return to the conference because of the embarrassment of spraining her ankle. There's no way to get back to Tokyo. Instead of waiting it out, Goto suggests they stop over at a motel for the night and drive back the next morning. The only problem is that there is only Love Motels in the area, not normal ones. Feeling a little nervous about the prospect, Shinobu reluctantly agrees to spend the night at one of these places. Goto of course does not really care where he spends the night. But could this be Goto's lucky day? This episode explores Goto's unrequited love towards Shinobu and shows that she might feel the same way.
13	"The Dungeon Again" "Danjon futatabi" (ダンジョン再び)	Mamoru Oshii	January 23, 1992
A urethra stone made of pearl is excreted from the captured albino alligator (now in the Tokyo Zoo) that was found in the labyrinth of tunnels under the reclaimed land beneath the SV2 hangar. With the stone being worth over ¥200,000,000, some of the mechanics try their luck to see if there are anymore albino alligators excreting the stones down there. They do not return and nobody is particularly happy about staging a rescue mission to find them, especially after what happened last time. Sakaki wants to seal the manhole up, but Asuma decides to help and ropes in most of Division 2 to help him. Meanwhile Matsui calls Gotoh to tell him Tadayama Fumihiro, the man who lived down there and occasionally stole food from the SV2, has escaped the mental institution he was in and is most likely headed back to the underground passages. This information comes a little to late for the team and they fall prey to most of his traps, causing Ota to accidentally shoot up most of their equipment. Will they ever get out of there alive?
14	"Snow Rondo" "Yuki no rondo" (雪のロンド)	Yutaka Izubuchi	February 20, 1992
Asuma discovers a postcard inviting him to a school reunion. However, he does not remember receiving it. He goes to the reunion and sees Yuki Kasama, a girl whom he once had a crush on when he was at school. He feels rather embarrassed and does not speak to her, but she goes over to talk to him after the reunion. After talking to her, he reluctantly asks her on a date. The next day they go to the museum and planetarium. Asuma has to go to the toilet but when he returns to his seat Yuki has gone. In the seat where she sat there is a postcard from an exhibition of photographs. Rather confused, he goes to the exhibition the following day and meets Yuki, who is looking at the photographs. She apologizes for leaving and they both sign the guest book. While walking her out, she mysteriously disappears again. The following day at a crime scene, Noa is about to fire upon a criminal labor. Suddenly Asuma sees Yuki standing behind the labor and orders Noa not to shoot. Noa eventually stops the labor, but his team mates are confused at his actions. They could not see anybody behind the labor. Later that night, Yuki comes to the SV2 hangar to apologize for actions that day. She tells him that she will be leaving the country and she'll never see him again. She runs out, but Asuma cannot catch up with her. The next day, he finds the invitation to the school reunion again, but the date is the following day. At the reunion, he asks about Yuki. His old school friends tell him that she has not been seen in years and no one could get in contact with her. Asuma goes to the exhibition and cannot find his or Yuki's name in the guest book. Did she actually meet him or is it all just a dream?
15	"The Woman Who Came from the Stars" "Hoshi kara ki ta onna" (星から来た女)	Kazunori Ito	March 19, 1992
Noa has had a hard day. She comes back to the hangar and heads straight for bed. She wakes in the middle of the night and notices a light on in a small building at the back of the hangar. She investigates, but can find no one inside. She places her hand on a poster on the wall, and a portal opens below her feet. She ends up in some sort of underground base, and finds the whole of the SV2 down there in strange uniforms. It is in fact the base for CLAT Japan (Creature from Luna Attack Team), an organization dedicated to fighting aliens, and the SV2 is just a front to keep the organization secret. Before Noa can react, aliens attack CLAT's orbiting base. Ota and Shinshi fly out to help Shinobu as her Labor has been hit by enemy fire. But Shinobu returns safely and reports Shinshi and Ota were shot down. Strangely both of them return sometime later, but they are actually aliens in disguise. The other team members are not fooled and shoot them dead before they can attack. The real Ota and Shinshi have been captured and Noa and Asuma head off to rescue them. Meanwhile the rest of the team fight off the hordes of UFOs currently attacking Earth. Noa and Asuma manage to rescue Ota and Shinshi, but in the process a monster emerges from the UFO they were being held in. Noa however has a secret, she can transform into Ingraman, a giant alien from the AV-98 Nebula who defends Earth. Note: This episode is a parody of the last episode "Farewell Ultraman" in the 1967 Ultraman series. It takes place after "CLAT Forever".
16	"All Quiet from the SV2" "Dai ni shōtai ijō nashi" (第二小隊異状なし)	Kazunori Ito	April 23, 1992
Division 2 are on vacation. Noa is doing some cleaning at home, but cannot find a personal item she had since she was a child. She goes to work but cannot find it there either. She meets Kumagami there who is writing up a proposal to create two extra Divisions. Ota is also there, dismantling and cleaning his Labor's gun. Kumagami submits her plan to Captain Goto and Shinobu. He tells her that they are already planning something like this and ask if she would be interested in being captain for the third division. She says that she would have to think it over, which surprises both Goto and Shinobu. The next day Kumagami is taking a trip to see some of the new cadets who will eventually form the third division, and asks everyone to come along. Asuma says he and Noa cannot and tells them they have something important to do. Despite her protests, Noa goes along with Asuma. Meanwhile the rest of the team arrive at the Police Academy to meet the new cadets. Ota decides to prove that he can take on the new cadets, and surprises everyone by using hand to hand combat instead of a gun. He easily defeats the cadet he is up against. When the team are just about to leave, the cadet that Ota had beaten hands over a bag with an item that a former cadet left behind. Asuma takes Noa to a graveyard. He takes her to the Shinohara family grave. He explains that today is the anniversary of his brother's death and that he committed suicide, perhaps to spite his father. On their way back to the car Asuma spots his father coming towards him. He tells Noa to wait in the car so he can talk to him. Asuma and his father have always been on bad terms.

== The Next Generation: Patlabor ==
No.	Title	Directed by	Original release date
0	"Eikou no Tokusha Nika" (Japanese: 栄光の特車二課)	Kiyotaka Taguchi	March 8, 2014
SV2's oldest member, Shiba, reminisces on the history of the division. While other episodes had advance theatrical screenings, episode 0 only was broadcast on television before the theatrical release. In the theatrical and video releases, it is part of "Chapter 1" alongside episode 1.
1	"Sandaime Shutsugeki seyo!" (Japanese: 三代目出動せよ！)	Mamoru Oshii	April 26, 2014
The third generation of SV2 spends most of their days slacking off. One day, however, they receive a dispatch request for the first time in a long time, and their AV-98 Ingram goes up against a Kuratas. This is a partial remake of the first episode of The Early Days OVA, and one of the four episodes where Oshii was both director and screenwriter. In the theatrical and video releases, it is part of "Chapter 1" alongside episode 0.
2	"98-shiki Kidou seyo" (Japanese: 98式再起動せよ)	Takanori Tsujimoto	May 31, 2014
SV2's ancient AV-98 Ingram has fallen into disrepair, but the police headquarters demand that it fire its gun as a salute during the general inspection, and the maintenance crew has to rush to get it up to shape. In the theatrical and video releases, it is part of "Chapter 2".
3	"Tekken Akira" (Japanese: 鉄拳アキラ)	Hiroaki Yuasa	May 31, 2014
Akira, who is a gamer, loses to a middle-aged man at Tekken who talks to her about the philosophy of winning. She trains for a rematch. In the theatrical and video releases, it is part of "Chapter 2".
4	"Norainu-tachi no Gogo" (Japanese: 野良犬たちの午後)	Takanori Tsujimoto	July 12, 2014
Akira goes to the convenience mart but ends up as a hostage when it is occupied by armed terrorists. In the theatrical and video releases, it is part of "Chapter 3".
5	"Daikaijuu Arawaru: Zenpen" (Japanese: 大怪獣現わる 前編)	Mamoru Oshii	July 12, 2014
Surfers start to disappear in Atami, and rumours of a giant sea creature begin to surface. This is a partial remake of episode 3 of the Early Days OVA, and one of the four episodes where Oshii was both director and screenwriter. In the theatrical and video releases, it is part of "Chapter 3".
6	"Daikaijuu Arawaru: Kouhen" (Japanese: 大怪獣現わる 後編)	Mamoru Oshii	August 30, 2014
A giant kaiju appears in Atami, and AV-98 SV2's Ingram goes up against it. This is a partial remake of episode 3 of the Early Days OVA, and is one of the four episodes where Oshii was both director and screenwriter. In the theatrical and video releases, it is part of "Chapter 4".
7	"Time Dokan" (Japanese: タイムドカン)	Hiroaki Yuasa	August 30, 2014
SV2 receives a phone call saying that they have set time bombs in SV2's building, just as Yamazaki's chicken coop explodes. They have to search for the remaining bombs before it is too late. In the theatrical and video releases, it is part of "Chapter 4".
8	"Enkyori Sogeki 2000" (Japanese: 遠距離狙撃2000)	Takanori Tsujimoto	October 18, 2014
An assassin known as the "Red Golgo" arrives in Japan to target Russian VIPs. He is in fact Kasha's teacher from her time in the FSB, and the two snipers face each other. In the theatrical and video releases, it is part of "Chapter 5".
9	"Crocodile Dungeon" (Japanese: クロコダイル・ダンジョン)	Kiyotaka Taguchi	October 18, 2014
SV2 sees on the news that the white crocodile which once lived in the labyrinth beneath their building (now in a zoo) laid a giant pearl worth 2 billion yen. They unseal the labyrinth and head inside seeking treasure, but are attacked by a dinosaur. This episode a direct sequel to episode 38 of the anime TV series. In the theatrical and video releases, it is part of "Chapter 5".
10	"Bousou! Akai Labor" (Japanese: 暴走! 赤いレイバー)	Kiyotaka Taguchi	November 29, 2014
Gotouda receives news that a military labor is being smuggled into Japan through Niigata, and he heads there with Yuuma to find a runaway terrorist. This episode is a partial remake of episode 9 of the anime TV series. In the theatrical and video releases, it is part of "Chapter 6".
11	"THE LONG GOODBYE" (Japanese: THE LONG GOODBYE)	Hiroaki Yuasa	November 29, 2014
Akira goes to a high school reunion and reunites with a man she once liked, but he has a hidden secret. In the theatrical and video releases, it is part of "Chapter 6".
SP	"Playback! Tokusha Nika Sonbou no Kiki" (Japanese: プレイバック！ 特車二課 存亡の危機)	Takanori Tsujimoto	January 10, 2015
A recap of the series up to this point. In the theatrical and video releases, it is part of "Chapter 7".
12	"Ooinaru Isan" (Japanese: 大いなる遺産)	Mamoru Oshii	January 10, 2015
The police commander falls ill, and factions in the police department use the discussions around the handing down of the position to a new successor as a chance to move to disband SV2, and in order to prevent this, Gotouda seeks out the "great legacy" or "time bomb" which the previous captain Gotou supposedly left behind which is said to have the power to stop this. However, the trail leads him to the man who once plotted a coup against Japan itself, Yukihito Tsuge. This episode is a direct sequel to Patlabor 2: The Movie, and ends on a cliffhanger leading into Shuto Kessen. This is one of the four episodes where Oshii was both director and screenwriter. In the theatrical and video releases, it is part of "Chapter 7".

== Patlabor EZY ==
Patlabor EZY consists of 8 episodes, released from 2026–2027 in three chapters in Japanese cinemas. Episodes 1-6 are in an anthology format, while episodes 7 and 8 tell a continuous story.

=== File 01 ===
No.	Title	Directed by	Written by	Original release date
1	"The Trend Is #Division2"; Transliteration: "Torendo wa# Dai Ni Shōtai" (Japanese: トレンドは#第二小隊)	Yutaka Izubuchi	Kazunori Ito	May 15, 2026
Towa and Division 2 are performing an educational outreach campaign at a preschool when they get an emergency call: a Labor rented for a Christmas event at a local mall has been hijacked and is wreaking havoc. Towa and Akihiko manage to subdue the Labor while Yuta arrests the pilot, but a virus inside the Labor starts it acting autonomously. As it threatens to approach a local temple, Towa shoots the Labor's leg to disable it. The culprits turn out to be childhood friends of the mall's owner, who wanted it to go viral to save it from closing down.
2	"Delusions in Leisure"; Transliteration: "Kanchū Mō Ari" (Japanese: 閑中妄あり)	Yutaka Izubuchi	Kazunori Ito	May 15, 2026
Section 2 is enjoying an extended period of time without deployment, and Captain Saeki is away. Some of the team are finding ways to make use of it; others, like Towa, are bored out of their minds. Towa begins writing a fake incident in the logbook in which the team are deployed to handle a powerful terrorist Labor (the AV-X0 from Patlabor: The Movie). The story is continued by Saki, Yuta, Akihiko, and Hachikuma, culminating in Towa's Ingram ejecting her and heroically sacrificing itself into Tokyo Bay with the AV-X0 to save the city. When she returns the next day, Captain Saeki is exasperated at her team's longing for action.
3	"Nothing Beats the Real Thing"; Transliteration: "Honmono ga Ichiban" (Japanese: ホンモノが一番)	Yutaka Izubuchi	Kazunori Ito	May 15, 2026
Division 2 are called in to provide security for filming of The Return of the Mountain God, a reboot of a tokusatsu period drama; the director Tokudaji insists on doing things without special effects, so the production uses real Labors. Isao Ota, from the original Division 2, is called in to drive the 'enemy' Labor, a crab-like monster. During filming, Tokudaji sets Ota's Labor on fire, which begins to melt its electronics and that of the other Labors on set as they fight with the crab monster. Division 2 rescue the actors and manage to put out the fire using the liquid-nitrogen coolant of the 'Mountain God' Labor. The next day, Tokudaji decides to start filming from scratch again. (Note: The film trailer shown in the episode's stinger is a homage to the StrayDog: Kerberos Panzer Cops trailer, and to Headgear member Mamoru Oshii.)

=== File 02 ===
No.	Title	Directed by	Written by	Original release date
4	"Wine and Bullets"; Transliteration: "Wain to Jūdan" (Japanese: ワインと銃弾)	Yutaka Izubuchi	Unknown	August 14, 2026
While preparing for an internal audit by headquarters, Kurumi—a member of the maintenance team—discovers that a live round for one of the Ingram’s revolvers are missing, two days before an auditor from HQ is due. She consults Kippei, Yuta, Akihiko, and Hachikuma, but they’re unable to find where the round might’ve gone. However, Towa and Saki, excluded from the investigation, begin to believe that the others are preparing a surprise party for them. When the inspector—Shigeo Shiba—arrives, Kurumi and the others decide to confess the truth. However, it turns out Shiba has had the round with him for replica casting, and never reported it. Because of the stress he’s caused them, the SV2 guilt Shiba into buying them all dinner.
5	"Dreams at Dawn"; Transliteration: "Asaki Yumemishi" (Japanese: あさき夢みし)	Yutaka Izubuchi	Unknown	August 14, 2026
Towa and Kippei rescue a young girl named Mana involved in an accident at a redevelopment construction site and take her to the hospital. Kippei accidentally retains the girl’s smartphone, and they exchange messages. However, when he tries to return the phone, there’s no record of Mana at the hospital, or of the accident. The pair talk to Mana’s grandfather, who tells them that Mana died six years ago, and that the construction site is threatening to tear down a shrine to the local deity Shirohebi, the white snake. Later, on a highway bridge, Kippei encounters Mana, who tells him the construction site is doomed. Kippei returns her phone, and Mana gives him a white snake as a good luck charm. The next day, a storm strikes the construction site, wrecking the equipment and causing the workers to flee. When Towa and Kippei return to Mana’s house, they learn that Mana’s grandfather also died previously; today is the end of the 49-day mourning period for him. On a Tokyo street, the spirits of Mana and her grandfather reunite before journeying to the spirit world.
6	"Survival of Love"; Transliteration: "Koi no Sabaibaru" (Japanese: 恋のサバイバル)	Yutaka Izubuchi	Unknown	August 14, 2026
In the mountains near Okutama during a downpour, Towa and Kippei set out to rescue a Labor operator stranded after a landslide, but are caught in a secondary landslide themselves. Although they have no cell service, and the Ingram and command car are both stuck in the mud, the two of them set out to rescue the Labor operator on foot. But along the trail they encounter a massive wild boar, who chases and attacks them until Kippei is finally able to scare it away. Towa and Kippei continue towards the stranded Labor operator. Towa is able to make a fire and forage for mushrooms, which she mentions is because her parents forced her to be a Girl Scout when she was young. Further along, Towa twists her ankle, and Kippei carries her. Eventually, the SV2 are able to rescue Towa and Kippei, and claim credit for their rescue as "saving a stranded Labor operator due to a landslide."
