= List of Aim for the Ace! episodes =

The anime series Aim for the Ace! is based on the manga series of the same written by Sumika Yamamoto. The series was directed by Osamu Dezaki and produced by Tokyo Movie Shinsha. Aim for the Ace! aired from October 5, 1973, to March 29, 1974, on Mainichi Broadcasting System. The 26 episodes were later released several times into DVD; by Bandai Visual in 2001 and 2005, and by Avex in 2012. The episodes follow Hiromi Oka, a high school student who wants to become a professional tennis player as she struggles against mental weakness, anxiety and thwarted love.

A remake of the series, Shin Ace o Nerae!, produced by Tokyo Movie and was directed by Minoru Okazaki, was broadcast by Nippon Television between April 10, 1978, and March 31, 1979. Two original video animation (OVA) sequels, Ace o Nerae! 2 and Ace o Nerae! Final Stage, were also produced by the company. The first OVA was released by Bandai Visual between July 25, 1988, and October 25, 1988, on six VHS videocassettes, while the second one was released by from October 23, 1989, to April 24, 1990.

The first series uses "Ace o Nerae!" as its opening theme and "Shiroi Tennis Court" (白いテニスコート) as its ending theme, both performed by Kumiko Ōsugi. The opening and ending theme from Shin Ace o Nerae!, "Seishun ni Kakero!" (青春にかけろ) and "Ashita ni Mukatte" (明日に向かって), were performed by band VIP. Hiroko Moriguchi sang Ace o Nerae! 2's theme, "Endless Dream" (エンドレス・ドリーム, Endoresu Dorīmu), as well as "Never Say Goodbye", Final Stage's theme.

== Episode list ==
=== Aim for the Ace! ===
No.	Title	Original air date
1	"Cinderella of the Tennis Kingdom"; Transliteration: "Tenisu Ōkoku no Shinderera" (Japanese: テニス王国のシンデレラ)	October 5, 1973
2	"The Player Is You!"; Transliteration: "Senshu wa Omaeda!" (Japanese: 選手はおまえだ!)	October 12, 1973
3	"Tears at the District Qualifying"; Transliteration: "Namida no Chiku Yosen" (Japanese: 涙の地区予選)	October 19, 1973
4	"Confrontation at the Tennis Court"; Transliteration: "Tenisu Kōto no Taiketsu" (Japanese: テニスコートの対決)	October 26, 1973
5	"The Demon Coach Strikes!"; Transliteration: "Oni Kōchi ni Butsukare!" (Japanese: 鬼コーチにぶつかれ!)	November 2, 1973
6	"Oh! The Semifinals Day"; Transliteration: "Ā! Junkesshō no Hi" (Japanese: ああ!準決勝の日)	November 9, 1973
7	"Bullet Serve of the Orchid"; Transliteration: "Dangan Sābu no Oran!" (Japanese: 弾丸サーブのお蘭!)	November 16, 1973
8	"Challenge of the Red Rose"; Transliteration: "Akai Bara no Chōsen" (Japanese: 赤いバラの挑戦)	November 23, 1973
9	"The Incandescent Match Point!"; Transliteration: "Hakunetsu no Matchi Pointo!" (Japanese: 白熱のマッチポイント!)	November 30, 1973
10	"The Tearly Withdrawal Notification"; Transliteration: "Namida no Taibu Todoke" (Japanese: 涙の退部とどけ)	December 7, 1973
11	"The Terror of the Spin Drive!"; Transliteration: "Kyōfu no Supin Doraibu!" (Japanese: 恐怖のスピンドライブ!)	December 14, 1973
12	"Showdown! The Butterfly versus the Orchid"; Transliteration: "Kessen! Ochō tai Oran" (Japanese: 決戦!お蝶対お蘭)	December 21, 1973
13	"I Like! I Like! I Like! Todo-san"; Transliteration: "Suki! Suki! Suki! Tōdō-san" (Japanese: すき!すき!すき!藤堂さん)	December 28, 1973
14	"Burn! Intensive Training at the Cold Wintry Wind"; Transliteration: "Moero! Kogarashi no Tokkun" (Japanese: 燃えろ!木枯しの特訓)	January 4, 1974
15	"The Secret of the Doubles Combination Birth"; Transliteration: "Daburusu Konbi Tanjō no Himitsu" (Japanese: ダブルスコンビ誕生の秘密)	January 11, 1974
16	"The Terror of the Tornado Serve"; Transliteration: "Kyōfu no Tatsumaki Sābu!" (Japanese: 恐怖の竜巻サーブ!)	January 18, 1974
17	"Groan! The Magical Twist Serve"; Transliteration: "Unaru! Ma no Tsuisuto Sābu" (Japanese: うなる!魔のツイストサーブ)	January 25, 1974
18	"Hit the Black Spy!"; Transliteration: "Kuroi Supai o Tatake!" (Japanese: 黒いスパイを叩け!)	February 1, 1974
19	"The Blood Dyed Turnabout"; Transliteration: "Chizome no Dai Gyakuten" (Japanese: 血ぞめの大逆転)	February 8, 1974
20	"Rally of the Burning Morning"; Transliteration: "Asa Yake no Rarī" (Japanese: 朝やけのラリー)	February 15, 1974
21	"Danger! Doubles Finals"; Transliteration: "Ayaushi! Daburusu Kesshō" (Japanese: あやうし!ダブルス決勝)	February 22, 1974
22	"During the Graduation Game Tears are Useless!"; Transliteration: "Sotsugyō Shiai ni Namida wa Muyō!" (Japanese: 卒業試合に涙は無用!)	March 1, 1974
23	"Drive! This Single Ball"; Transliteration: "Uchikome! Kono Ichi-kyū o" (Japanese: 打ちこめ!この一球を)	March 8, 1974
24	"The Love Letter Dancing in the Court"; Transliteration: "Kōto ni Mau Rabu Retā" (Japanese: コートに舞うラブレター)	March 15, 1974
25	"Do Not Lose to the Men's Tennis!"; Transliteration: "Danshi Tenisu ni Makeruna!" (Japanese: 男子テニスに負けるな!)	March 22, 1974
26	"Hiromi versus the Butterfly! The Final Showdown"; Transliteration: "Hiromi tai Ochō! Saigo no Taiketsu" (Japanese: ひろみ対お蝶!最後の対決)	March 29, 1974

=== Shin Ace o Nerae! ===
No.	Title	Original release date
1	"Hiromi, the Butterfly, the Demon Coach"; Transliteration: "Hiromi to Ochō to Oni Kōchi" (Japanese: ひろみとお蝶と鬼コーチ)	October 14, 1978
2	"Player, Trouble, Todo-san"; Transliteration: "Senshu to Meiwaku to Tōdō-san" (Japanese: 選手と迷惑と藤堂さん)	October 21, 1978
3	"Feigned Illness, Vicious, Compassion"; Transliteration: "Kebyō to Ijiwaru to Omoiyari" (Japanese: 仮病といじわると思いやり)	October 28, 1978
4	"Match, Convulsions, Riding a Bicycle"; Transliteration: "Shiai to Keiren to Jitensha ni Notte" (Japanese: 試合とケイレンと自転車にのって)	November 4, 1978
5	"Hiromi, Envy Heart, Vanished Racket"; Transliteration: "Hiromi to Netami Kokoro to Kieta Raketto" (Japanese: ひろみと妬み心と消えたラケット)	November 11, 1978
6	"Special Training, Tenacity, Hot View"; Transliteration: "Tokkun to Nebari to Atsui Manazashi" (Japanese: 特訓とねばりとあついまなざし)	November 18, 1978
7	"The Orchid, Talent, White Coat"; Transliteration: "Oran to Soshitsu to Shiroi Kōto" (Japanese: お蘭と素質と白いコート)	November 25, 1978
8	"Anxiety, Anxiety, Red Rose"; Transliteration: "Fuan to Fuan to Akai Bara" (Japanese: 不安と不安と赤いバラ)	December 2, 1978
9	"Tear, Withdrawal Notification, Beloved Court"; Transliteration: "Namida to Taibu to Koishī Kōto" (Japanese: 涙と退部と恋しいコート)	December 9, 1978
10	"Comeback, Passion, Madame Butterfly"; Transliteration: "Kamubakku to Jōnetsu to Ochōfujin" (Japanese: カムバックと情熱とお蝶夫人)	December 16, 1978
11	"Hatred, the Orchid, Winter Winds"; Transliteration: "Nikushimi to Oran to Fuyu no Kaze" (Japanese: 憎しみとお蘭と冬の風)	December 23, 1978
12	"Hiromi, Doubles, Coach's Secret"; Transliteration: "Hiromi to Daburusu to Kōchi no Himitsu" (Japanese: ひろみとダブルスとコーチの秘密)	December 30, 1978
13	"Love, Fighting Spirit, Jin Munakata"; Transliteration: "Ai to Tōshi to Munakata Jin" (Japanese: 愛と闘志と宗方仁)	January 6, 1979
14	"Handshake, Drawback, My Tennis"; Transliteration: "Akushu to Hike-me to Watashi no Tenisu" (Japanese: 握手とひけめと私のテニス)	January 13, 1979
15	"Love, Power, Karuizawa"; Transliteration: "Koi to Pawā to Karuizawa" (Japanese: 恋とパワーと軽井沢)	January 20, 1979
16	"Confidence, Indulgence, Exception Members"; Transliteration: "Jishin to Kahogo to Reigai Menbā" (Japanese: 自信と過保護と例外メンバー)	January 27, 1979
17	"Formidable Enemy, Two Losses, Wings of Love"; Transliteration: "Kyōteki to Ni-pai to Ai no Tsubasa" (Japanese: 強敵と二敗と愛の翼)	February 3, 1979
18	"Popularity, Medal, The Pursued Woman"; Transliteration: "Ninki to Medaru to Nerawa Reru Onna" (Japanese: 人気とメダルと狙われる女)	February 10, 1979
19	"Party, Hug, Dilemma"; Transliteration: "Konpa to Hōyō to Itabasami" (Japanese: コンパと抱擁と板ばさみ)	February 17, 1979
20	"Hiromi, Overseas Expedition, Coach's Plans"; Transliteration: "Hiromi to Kaigai Ensei to Kōchi no Keikaku" (Japanese: ひろみと海外遠征とコーチの計画)	February 24, 1979
21	"Hiromi, Solidarity, Southern Cross"; Transliteration: "Hiromi to Katai Kizuna to Minami Jūjisei" (Japanese: ひろみと固い絆と南十字星)	March 3, 1979
22	"Love, Frustration, Restart"; Transliteration: "Koi to Zasetsu to Sai Shuppatsu" (Japanese: 恋と挫折と再出発)	March 10, 1979
23	"Impact, Ripple, Madame Butterfly"; Transliteration: "Shōgeki to Hamon to Ochōfujin" (Japanese: 衝撃と波紋とお蝶夫人)	March 17, 1979
24	"Love, Awareness, Ominous Presentiment"; Transliteration: "Ai to Jikaku to Fukitsuna Yokan" (Japanese: 愛と自覚と不吉な予感)	March 24, 1979
25	"Glorious Future, Eternal Farewell, Jin Munakata"; Transliteration: "Kagayaku Mirai to Eien no Wakare to Munakata Jin" (Japanese: 輝く未来と永遠の別れと宗方仁)	March 31, 1979

=== Ace o Nerae! 2 ===
No.	Title	Original air date
1	"Promise of Best Friend"; Transliteration: "Muni no Shin'yū no Yakusoku" (Japanese: 無二の親友の約束)	July 25, 1988
2	"Oka, Aim for the Ace!"; Transliteration: "Oka, Ace o Nerae!" (Japanese: 岡、エースをねらえ!)	July 25, 1988
3	"Overseas Expedition without a Coach"; Transliteration: "Kōchi no Inai Kaigai Ensei" (Japanese: コーチのいない海外遠征)	July 25, 1988
4	"Sorrow of New York"; Transliteration: "Kanashimi no Nyū Yōku" (Japanese: 哀しみのニューヨーク)	July 25, 1988
5	"A Diary That was Left"; Transliteration: "Nokosareta nikki" (Japanese: 残された日記)	July 25, 1988
6	"Goodbye, Coach"; Transliteration: "Sayonara Kōchi" (Japanese: さよならコーチ)	September 25, 1988
7	"Into Sadness"; Transliteration: "Kanashimi no Naka e" (Japanese: 悲しみの中へ)	September 25, 1988
8	"Racket of Jin Munakata"; Transliteration: "Munakata Jin no Raketto" (Japanese: 宗方仁のラケット)	September 25, 1988
9	"Court of Confession"; Transliteration: "Kizudarake no Kōto" (Japanese: 傷だらけのコート)	September 25, 1988
10	"Rivals"; Transliteration: "Raibaru-tachi" (Japanese: ライバルたち)	October 25, 1988
11	"The Previous Night Decisive Battle"; Transliteration: "Kessen Zen'ya" (Japanese: 決戦前夜)	October 25, 1988
12	"Bullet Serve: Revival!"; Transliteration: "Dangan Sābu Fukkatsu!" (Japanese: 弾丸サーブ・復活!)	October 25, 1988
13	"Surely...I Have Seen"; Transliteration: "Kitto...Miteiru" (Japanese: きっと…見ている)	October 25, 1988

=== Ace o Nerae! Final Stage ===
No.	Title	Original release date
1	"I Like You!"; Transliteration: "Boku wa Sukida, Kimi ga!" (Japanese: 僕は好きだ、君が!)	October 23, 1989
2	"The Summer of 19 Years Old"; Transliteration: "Jūku-sai no Natsu" (Japanese: 19才の夏)	October 23, 1989
3	"Never Say Good Bye (Note: The episode's title used English lettering in the Japanese airing.)"	November 24, 1989
4	"I Want to Meet You, Mr. Todo"; Transliteration: "Aitai, Tōdō-san....." (Japanese: 会いたい、藤堂さん･････)	November 24, 1989
5	"No Turn Back Anymore"; Transliteration: "Mō Hikikaesenai" (Japanese: もう引き返せない)	December 23, 1989
6	"New York, the City in which is Mr. Todo"; Transliteration: "Nyūyōku, Tōdō-san no Iru Machi" (Japanese: ニューヨーク、藤堂さんのいる街)	December 23, 1989
7	"Advantage..."	January 24, 1990
8	"The Last Repechage Match!"; Transliteration: "Saigo no Haisha Fukkatsu-sen!" (Japanese: 最後の敗者復活戦･･･!)	January 24, 1990
9	"Queens Cup '90 Kicks Off!"; Transliteration: "Kuīnzu Kappu '90 Kaimaku!" (Japanese: クイーンズカップ'90開幕!)	February 25, 1990
10	"Challenger, Ranko"; Transliteration: "Charenjā, Ranko!" (Japanese: チャレンジャー、蘭子!)	February 25, 1990
11	"No Longer Able to Fly Again"; Transliteration: "Mō, Tobenaku Narimashita" (Japanese: もう、翔べなくなりました･･･)	April 24, 1990
12	"Final Stage"	April 24, 1990

== Notes and references ==
Notes
