= Bible Black =

2000 eroge video game from Japan

- English cover of the Bible Black visual novel

バイブルブラック (Baiburu Burakku)
- Genre: Drama, horror, hentai
- Video game
- Developer: ActiveSoft
- Publisher: JP: ActiveSoft; NA: Kitty Media
- Genre: Eroge
- Platform: Microsoft Windows, PlayStation Portable
- Released: July 14, 2000
- Original video animation
- Directed by: Sho Hanebu (ep. 1–4); Kazuyuki Honda (ep. 5–6)
- Studio: Studio Jam
- Licensed by: US: Kitty Media
- Released: July 25, 2001 – June 25, 2003
- Runtime: 28 minutes
- Episodes: 6
- Original video animation

Origins
- Directed by: Hamuo
- Studio: Studio Jam
- Licensed by: US: Kitty Media
- Released: May 25, 2002 – August 25, 2002
- Runtime: 28 minutes
- Episodes: 2
- Original video animation

New Testament
- Directed by: Hamuo
- Studio: Studio Jam
- Licensed by: US: Kitty Media
- Released: April 25, 2004 – December 25, 2007
- Runtime: 27 minutes (epi. 1-5); 35 minutes (epi. 6)
- Episodes: 6
- Original video animation

Only
- Directed by: Yoshiten
- Studio: Studio Jam
- Licensed by: US: Kitty Media
- Released: July 25, 2005 – April 25, 2006
- Runtime: 27 minutes (ep. 1–2); 10 minutes (ep. 3)
- Episodes: 3
- icon

Bible Black (バイブルブラック, Baiburu Burakku) is an eroge video game developed by ActiveSoft and published on July 14, 2000. Sei Shoujo is the original creator of the game's artwork, character design and penned the original script for the game. It received notable critical acclaim for an eroge hentai anime.

Milky Studio has since adapted the game into several adult anime adaptations. The first adaptation, simply titled Bible Black, consisted of six episodes covering numerous scenes from the video game. The following year, a two-episode OVA titled Bible Black: Origins was released, which served as a prequel to the events of Bible Black. In April 2004, Milky Studio produced a sequel series titled Bible Black: New Testament, which follows the exploits of the original characters ten years after Bible Black takes place. The latest OVA adaptation, Bible Black Only, consists of gaiden stories explaining what happened to various characters during the plot of Bible Black.

The game was republished in 2006 as Bible Black Slim featuring extended scenes, followed by a short sequel named Bible Black Infection in 2008. Neither of these games involved the original artist/writer Sei Shoujo as he had left ActiveSoft by this time.

The title is a reference to the song "Starless and Bible Black" by the British progressive rock band King Crimson. There have been multiple other eroge written by Bible Black's author Sei Shoujo afterwards that share names with songs from King Crimson, such as Discipline (2002), Starless (2011), Great Deceiver (2019), and Sleepless (2022).

== Synopsis ==
=== Setting ===
The game takes place in an academy rumored to have been the base of operations for a coven, twelve years prior to the premiere installment. This witchcraft club practiced black magic in a storage room of the academy's basement.

=== Plot ===
Taki Minase, a high school student, finds a book of black magic in the isolated storage room of his school. He begins practicing black magic, which has extreme sexual effects that benefit him and his friends, until evil comes forth from the dark craft. Eventually, the origins of the book are revealed, as is the incident on Walpurgis Night twelve years prior, when the evil force was at its strongest. After coming to his senses, Minase struggles to get himself out of the darkness into which he has put himself and his best friend and secret love, Kurumi Imari.

== Characters ==
Taki Minase (水無瀬 多喜, Minase Taki)
The main character, a high school student who discovers the magic book (known as "Bible Black") in a school basement and becomes a pawn of powerful dark magic.

Kurumi Imari (伊万里 胡桃, Imari Kurumi)
Minase's childhood friend, neighbor and de facto girlfriend. She comes over to wake Minase up every morning. She knows everything about Minase, and tries to help him in every way. She is holder of a black belt in Shorinji Kempo and very tough. She is good at cooking and takes care of Minase when Yukiko is away.

Hiroko Takashiro (高城 寛子, Takashiro Hiroko)
The high school's art teacher, who is in charge of the art club, which both Minase and Imari are part of. She is very popular among the students for her good looks and kind personality.

Reika Kitami (北見 麗華, Kitami Reika)
The mysterious high school nurse and the main antagonist of the series. She seems to take a liking to Minase, and knows about his experiments with black magic. She was used as a sacrificial virgin in a ritual for the original Witchcraft Group (which was initially led by Miss Takashiro). However, since she was in fact not a virgin (she had been previously gang-raped), the ritual went horribly awry. When the gates of Hell opened, she made a deal with Satan that kept her alive in exchange for her soul. Now, the time that Satan gave her is running out, and she is searching for a new virginal female body to use as a reincarnation.

Kaori Saeki (佐伯 香織, Saeki Kaori)
Minase's classmate. She is obsessed with the occult, and has established a new occult group based on the one from twelve years ago. She knows a lot about black magic, and her fortune telling is very popular. She becomes interested in Minase and tries to seduce him after learning he possesses the book.

Rika Shiraki (白木 里香, Shiraki Rika)
The head of the student council. Wealthy and untouchable, she is very popular among the boys. She develops a crush on Minase after spells are cast on her.

Jun Amatsuki (天月 純, Amatsuki Jun)
A member of Saeki's Occult Club.

Maki Kurimoto (栗本 真紀, Kurimoto Maki)
A member of Saeki's Occult Club.

Miyuki Nonogusa (野々草 美由紀, Nonogusa Miyuki)
A member of the high school swim team. She was once in the same class as Minase. The other members of the swim team envy her.

Shinobu Kobayashi (小林 忍, Kobayashi Shinobu)
Captain of the high school swim team. She loathes Nonogusa out of jealousy.

Mikimoto (美樹本)
A member of the high school swim team. One of Kobayashi's flunkies.

Yukiko Minase (水無瀬 由起子, Minase Yukiko)
Presented as Minase's stepsister in the anime, Yukiko is actually Minase's live-in cousin and guardian in the original game, though the two act like siblings. She is a strong-willed person, and enjoys bullying Minase, as well as teasing him at home with flashy outfits. Being a Latin and French major student in college, she helps Minase translate the contents of the magic book.

Mika Ito (伊藤 美香, Itō Mika)
Minase's classmate and one of Saeki's followers. She is the first victim of Minase's practice of magic from the book.

Ayumi Murai (村井 亜由美, Murai Ayumi)
Minase's classmate and one of Saeki's followers. She finds out that Minase can use black magic, and asks him to chant an incantation for her.

=== Bible Black: Origins characters ===
Nami Kozono (小園 奈美, Kozono Nami)
A mysterious, raven-haired lesbian who is the president of the school's student council. She is very popular with the boys, despite not being interested in men. She eventually becomes the leader of the witchcraft club, setting in motion the events of the original Bible Black.

Junko Mochida (持田 潤子, Mochida Junko)
Nami Kozono's lesbian lover who is also a member of the Student Council. She refers to Nami affectionately as "Onee-sama" (Big sister). Junko is the group's first experiment with magic; she was put under a simple spell that caused her to masturbate in front of the whole school during a speech. This both caused Junko social rejection and caused Takashiro to establish the Witchcraft Group.

== Visual novel ==
System requirements
Requirement	Minimum	Recommended
Microsoft Windows
Operating system	Windows 95	Windows 2000
CPU	Pentium 166 MHz or faster	Pentium II 233 MHz
Memory	32 MB RAM	64 MB RAM
Free space	10 MB of free space	

The game has twelve different endings, and the storyline often diverges, based on choices made by the player, which influence "neutral" endings, "chaos" endings and "law" endings. However, there is only one outcome regarded by its developers as the "true" ending. Bible Black was published in English in 2006, under the name Bible Black: The Game after Activesoft ceased operations. A port was released only in Japan for the PlayStation Portable's UMD format, where it was not required to receive a CERO rating.

== Anime ==
=== Bible Black ===
Bible Black (バイブルブラック, Baiburu Burakku; Bible Black) is the eponymous first OVA adaptation of the video game.

An academy student, Taki Minase, finds a strange book, the Bible Black, while exploring an abandoned room in his school's basement. With the help of his cousin, he translates the Latin-French writings and finds them to be instructions for dark magic, which is actually a form of Kabbalistic satanism (the translation was not mentioned in the OVA).

Using the book's magic, Minase is able to make Rika Shiraki fall in love with him, as well as help his friend, Ayumi Murai, get the boy she loves to love her back. Reika Kitami, the school nurse, hears of his magical acts and decides to sway him to her since she needs the book for herself. Twelve years prior on Walpurgis Night, Kitami was used as a sacrifice for the previous Witchcraft Club and only survived after making a deal with Satan, becoming a futanari in the process. Kitami now needs a virgin girl to act as a vessel for her reincarnation as the life that Satan has given her is running out. Kaori Saeki, the head of the new Witchcraft Club, also notes Minase's magic acts and persuades him to come to one of her meetings with the book. After being seduced by Kitami and possessed by a lesser demon, Minase brings her with him and she rapes Saeki into submission, taking over the Witchcraft Club.

Kitami holds private counseling sessions for girls, trying to find the virgin she needs. She reveals to Minase that the two girls she has had her eyes on were Shiraki and Minase's childhood friend, Kurumi Imari. However, since Shiraki is no longer a virgin (thanks to Minase), Kitami pursues Imari, who has been missing school recently after walking in on Minase and Shiraki during intercourse. Kitami also regularly kidnaps the art teacher, Hiroko Takashiro, and performs sexual tortures on her after finding out that Takashiro was the head of the Witchcraft Club that had sacrificed her, even though Takashiro had left the circle prior to the ritual.

After Imari is abducted by Kitami, the lesser demon leaves Minase and he realizes that he loves Imari and must save her. With the help of Takashiro and the Bible Black, he finds a spell Takashiro believes will stop Kitami's evil scheme. By this point, it is Walpurgis Night once again, and Kitami plans to reincarnate herself into Imari. Kitami slits her wrists and has sexual intercourse with Imari as the reincarnation ritual demands, but Minase interrupts it and casts his spell on Kitami. This apparently causes the ritual to fail, and Kitami dies from blood loss.

Afterwards, Minase and Imari confess their love for each other and have intercourse. Some time later, Saeki is seen in the Witchcraft Club sanctuary, planning to steal the Bible Black, which was going to be left there before the entrance was sealed. Imari enters the room and destroys the Bible Black with a fire spell, then reveals herself as a futanari, showing that Kitami's ritual was successful. The series ends with Imari deciding to test her new body out by raping Saeki again.

All six episodes of Bible Black have since been re-cut as a 110-minute film titled Bible Black Complete Version (バイブルブラック 完全版, Baiburu Burakku Kanzenban). The series was also involved in a bit of minor controversy when it was aired as a "midnight movie" at a time when other anime films were being played on Canadian youth station Teletoon, supposedly as an accident of nobody checking what was screened. Only the first 30 minutes were played.

==== Cast and characters ====
Character	Voice actor
Taki Minase	Osamu Tokita, Takuya Hiramatsu (first two episodes only)
Kurumi Imari	Kaori Nishijima
Hiroko Takashiro	Nagisa Futami, Akemi Kimura (first two episodes only)
Rika Shiraki	Rika Koyama
Kaori Saeki	Haruna Kanbayashi
Reika Kitami	Michiru Shirozaki
Mika Ito	Kimika Sasa
Yukiko Minase	Kanan Yuzuki

==== Episodes ====
No.	Title
1	"School of Black Magic" "Kuromajutsu no Gakuen" (Japanese: 黒魔術の学園)
2	"Black Ceremony" "Kuro no Gishiki" (Japanese: 黒の儀式)
3	"Black Sacrifice" "Kuro no Ikenie" (Japanese: 黒の生贄)
4	"Black Caress" "Kuro no Aibu" (Japanese: 黒の愛撫)
5	"Black Dinner" "Kuro no Bansan" (Japanese: 黒の晩餐)
6	"Black Descent" "Kuro no Kōrin" (Japanese: 黒の降臨)

=== Bible Black: Origins ===
Bible Black: Origins (バイブルブラック 外伝, Baiburu Burakku: Gaiden; Bible Black: Side Story) is the game's second OVA adaptation, released on May 25, 2002. Set about twelve years before the events of the original OVA, Hiroko Takashiro and Reika Kitami are now students at the school, and several new characters are also introduced. The first episode opens with two female students, Nami Kozono and her lover Junko Mochida, having sex in a classroom after school. In another classroom, Hiroko Takashiro and her two best friends Rie Morita and Saki Shindou are reading Tarot cards. They receive a fortune reading: Great change is upon you. Something will change your life, completely. Nami soon interrupts them and says that they should leave if they are not part of a club. After she berates the group for their interest in Witchcraft, Hiroko warns her to not take Witchcraft lightly. She explains that they are trying to learn the truth about history through Witchcraft, and even asks Nami to join them. Nami is initially intrigued, but quickly brushes it off and mocks them again.

The next day, the school receives a new transfer student, Reika Kitami, a beautiful but naive girl; meanwhile, Rie finds the titular Bible Black in an antique store and shares it with Hiroko and Saki. Here it is also revealed that the girls' request to start a Witchcraft club has been denied by Nami, who is the head of Student Council.

Nami takes a strong interest in Reika, and flirts with her in the bathroom later that day, though this only seems to make her uncomfortable. When Reika does not return Nami's affection, her flirting turns into unwanted sexual advances. After school, Nami offers to tutor Reika in a class she is having trouble with, and uses it as an opportunity to sexually assault her. When a humiliated Reika rejects her, Nami becomes furious—having never been rejected in her life—and storms out.

Hiroko and her friends begin to translate the Franco-Latin-Hebraic text of the Bible Black, and plan to get revenge on Nami for forbidding them to start a Witchcraft club. As a test run, they cast a simple spell on Nami's lover, Junko, which is said to make a young woman "dance naked". Their spell proves successful when the next day Junko becomes aroused while giving a speech for an assembly, causing her to strip down and masturbate in front of the whole school. Nami is horrified by the incident, and becomes suspicious of the group when Saki later threatens that she might "be the next to dance naked".

After school, Hiratani, an outcast male student who is obsessed with Nami, asks the group to put a spell on Nami to make her fall in love with him. They do this, and when Nami arrives at school the next day, she finds herself hopelessly infatuated with Hiratani. She asks him to meet her in the Student Council room during lunch, where they have sex many times. Hiroko, Rie and Saki look on through a window, amazed that their magic has worked. The group is approached by other students (and a few teachers) to do similar favors, and they make a fair amount of money.

Desperate for even more of Hiratani's attention, Nami goes to Hiroko and her friends one day after school and begs them to use their magic to make Hiratani love her forever. Hiroko says she will do this, in exchange for a place where the group can practice their magic. Nami arranges for them to use the school basement, and Hiroko agrees to cast the spell. But instead of carrying out Nami's request, she casts a "release spell" on her, causing her to come to her senses and become furious, disgusted that she "fucked that filthy man", and Nami flees the room in anger.

Returning to school the next day, Nami is disgusted to find that Hiratani is still very much in love with her. She orders a group of thugs to beat him into unconsciousness in a warehouse. With Hiratani gone, Nami begins to pursue Reika again, begging her to have sex with her in order to "purify" her body of Hiratani's stench. Reika finally lashes out and slaps Nami in self-defense, calling her crazy.

Eager for revenge on both Reika and Hiroko's group, Nami gains the trust of Hiroko and asks to join their club (now called "Rose Cross"). Hiroko allows her in, amused at how eager Nami is to join them after initially mocking them.

The group plans to eventually summon Satan himself, but realize that they need a test before they move onto a full human sacrifice. For their first ritual, they decide to summon a demon, in order to get Satan on their side. For the sacrifice, they slaughter a stray puppy that Reika had befriended upon first coming to school. However, the ritual goes horribly wrong and the demon proceeds to violently rape Hiroko, thus sending her to the hospital.

With Walpurgis Night fast approaching, Nami takes advantage of Hiroko's absence and makes herself the leader of Rose Cross. On the day of Walpurgis, she decides to use Reika as a virgin sacrifice that will open the Gates of Hell. She has her thugs kidnap Reika and take her to the warehouse, where they reveal to her the carcass of the sacrificed puppy. Nami gives the thugs permission to gang-rape Reika while she and the group prepare for the ritual, so long as they only engage in anal intercourse with her, thus keeping her virginity intact. One of the thugs ignores her order and takes Reika's virginity anyway, unbeknownst to Nami. Meanwhile, Hiroko wakes up in the hospital and, realizing it is Walpurgis night, checks herself out. Upon returning, she urges the group to stop using magic, saying its power is far too strong for them to handle. She fails to convince them, however, and is forcibly ousted by Nami and the rest of the group, and is placed by Rie and Saki in a closet until the ritual ends.

Reika is sacrificed, but since she is no longer a virgin, the Gates of Hell react but do not open. Nami, now delirious and hellbent on getting revenge on the group, goes on a murderous rampage and slaughters the other members, including Hiroko's friends, until the Gates finally begin to open. Nami drops her sword on the ground and stands in front of the gates to chant to Satan. Reika—severely injured, but still alive—uses the last of her strength to stab Nami to death. Satan then proposes a contract to the dying Reika: he will allow her several more years to live, if she gives him her soul in return. Reluctant, but quickly dying, Reika accepts the deal.

Moments later, Hiroko, having managed to free herself, hurries down to the basement, only to find that the ritual had ended, and that the members of Rose Cross (Nami, Rie, and Saki included) have all been savagely slaughtered. The series ends with a visibly disturbed Reika, naked and bloodied from head to toe, roaming the town at dawn, looking blissfully towards the sky. The scene fades out with a shot of her still walking through the town, on her way to becoming the woman that Kurumi Imari and Taki Minase would meet twelve years later.

==== Cast and characters ====
Character	Voice actor
Junko Mochida	Midori Sasaoka
Seiji "Hiratani" Hiraya	Yasuteru Momozawa
Hiroko Takashiro	Nagisa Futami
Nami Kozono	Kaori Sanada
Saki Shidou	Yoko Iwatani
Reika Kitami	Michiru Shirozaki
Rie Morita	Noriko Kitani

==== Episodes ====
No.	Title
1	"Black Hallmark" "Kuro no Kokuin" (Japanese: 黒の刻印)
2	"Black Altar" "Kuro no Saidan" (Japanese: 黒の祭壇)

=== New Bible Black ===
Shin Baiburu Burakku (新・バイブルブラック; New Bible Black), is the third installment of the OVA series. Years have passed since Walpurgis Night, and the girls of the Witchcraft Club have all graduated, and made their way in the world. Both Shiraki and Saeki become teachers at their school, while Takashiro becomes a Buddhist nun. Imari has become a police woman, who serves as a psychic investigator in the Tokken division. Her team is looking into a series of horribly gruesome murder cases, that all seem to have happened during sexual intercourse.

Strangely, witnesses see a ghostly figure at the crime scenes. Saeki restarts the Witchcraft Club with a new crop of girls, but it is unclear at first, whether she is fighting or helping Kitami. Meanwhile, Imari and her Tokken subordinate, Aki, are caught up in a bank robbery, conducted by occult robbers. An impromptu ceremony performed at the scene causes Kitami to take over the possessed Imari. In the aftermath, Imari steals the Lance of Longinus that the robbers were after, from the bank vault.

Imari/Kitami has found the virginal "Scarlet Woman" in Aki. She indulges in the sexual ceremony with her, using the Lance of Longinus. Meanwhile, the ghostly figure, identified as Jody Crowley, and Takashiro, both interfere with the ceremony, albeit with different intentions. The Lance becomes permanently lodged within Aki's vagina, and she is now targeted by the various forces of black magic.

The final ceremony climaxes with the black magic forces of Imari/Kitami, and Jody Crowley, both competing over the Scarlet Woman. Attacks fly all around, while Takashiro and Captain Yuge struggle to defeat both of them, hoping to end the ceremony. When Jody seems to emerge triumphant, the Lance of Longinus reappears out of Aki, and reanimates the original grimoire, the Bible Black. The devil emerges to take the souls of contract: Reika Kitami and Jody Crowley. A final effort by Takashiro manages to seal the grimoire while Jody's soul is taken, and Kitami manages to possess Jody's body instead. The final scene seems peaceful, with everybody content with how things turned out, but during one of the final shots, Aki's laptop screensaver happens to be several images of a menacing Kitami, hinting at a possible future installment to the series.

Most of the characters from Bible Black return in New Testament; however, Minase does not appear and is only mentioned once, leaving his fate unclear.

All six episodes of New Testament have since been recut as a 120-minute film titled New Bible Black Complete Version: Restored ~Rinne~ (新・バイブルブラック完全版 Restored 〜輪廻〜, Shin Baiburu Burakku Kanzenban Restored ~ Rinne ~), and in addition contains extended animation.

==== Episodes ====
No.	Title
1	"Revival" "Fukkatsu" (Japanese: 復活)
2	"Reunion" "Saikai" (Japanese: 再会)
3	"Rule" "Shihai" (Japanese: 支配)
4	"Recollection" "Sōki" (Japanese: 想起)
5	"Rejection" "Kyozetsu" (Japanese: 拒絶)
6	"Reproduction" "Saisei" (Japanese: 再生)

=== Bible Black Only ===
Bible Black: Onrī-ban (Bible Black オンリー版) consists of seven short films, which depict sexual side stories that take place around the time of the original series.

==== Episodes ====
No.	Title
1	"Bible Black Only Version: La Noche de Walpurgis Vol. 1: Takashiro Hiroko Hen•Itō & Suieibu Hen•Saeki Hen" "Bible Black Only Ban Vol. 1: Takashiro Hiroko Hen•Itō & Suieibu Hen•Saeki Hen" (Japanese: Bible Black オンリー版 Vol. 1: 高城寛子編・伊藤&水泳部編・佐伯編)
Three short films: "Takashiro Hiroko Hen: Shokuin Toire de..." (高城寛子編：職員トイレで...; "At the Faculty Room Toilet..."): Takashiro is assaulted by the vice principal in a toilet stall.; "Itō & Suieibu Hen: Himitsu no Tokkun" (伊藤&水泳部編：秘密の特訓; "Secret Lesson"): Various students, mostly members of the swim team, have an orgy in a locker room.; "Saeki Hen: Jitsuroku Kōishitsu" (佐伯編：実録・更衣室; "Events in the Locker Room"): Saeki masturbates and is joined by two male students. This was originally released with the movie on September 25, 2003.
—	"Imari Rape Scene" "Imari Ryōjoku Genba" (Japanese: 伊万里 凌辱現場)
A ten minute Bible Black Only short released on January 25, 2006 as part of the box set; currently not commercially available in Region 1/English.: Imari is sexually assaulted by a male student at school.
2	"Bible Black Only Version: La Noche de Walpurgis Vol. 2: Yukiko Hen•Saeki Hen•Takashiro Hen" "Bible Black Only Ban Vol. 2: Yukiko Hen•Saeki Hen•Takashiro Hen" (Japanese: Bible Black オンリー版 Vol. 2: 由起子編・佐伯編・高城編)
Three short films: "Yukiko Hen: Himitsu no Chōkyō" (由紀子編：秘密の調教; "Secret Torture"): Yukiko Minase cannot control her lust and is sexually dominated by one of her professors.; "Saeki Hen: Dōtei Kari / Inbusuru Akuma-tachi" (佐伯編：童貞狩り 淫舞する悪魔達; "Virgin Hunting/Obscene Dance of the Devils"): Members of the magic club gather ingredients for a black magic spell and then perform it.; "Takashiro Hen: Sore wa Sensei..." (高城編：それはセンセイ...; "That's a Teacher"): Takashiro fantasizes about an orgy with her male students. This was originally released with the movie on September 25, 2003.
