= List of Tenchi Muyo! Ryo-Ohki episodes =

Tenchi Muyo! Ryo-Ohki is an OVA anime series created by Masaki Kajishima. Directed by Hiroki Hayashi and produced by Anime International Company, the OVA was originally released in Japan on 25 September 1992. It was produced by AIC. Pioneer LDC produced the first two OVA series, and later by VAP for the third OVA series. Pioneer Entertainment (later Geneon) had licensed the first two OVA series and released them on LaserDisc, VHS and DVD. The third OVA series was licensed by Funimation Entertainment. After Geneon's departure from the North American market in November 2007, Funimation rescued the first two OVA series, along with a handful of other Tenchi Muyo! properties (except for Pretty Sammy's OVAs and TV series). Funimation released a limited edition Blu-ray/DVD combo pack on December 4, 2012. The first two OVAs aired on Cartoon Network's Toonami block from July 3, 2000, to July 19, 2000.

== Episodes ==
=== First series ===
No.	Title	Original release date	English release date
1	"Ryoko Resurrected"; Transliteration: "Ryōko Fukkatsu" (Japanese: 魎呼復活)	September 25, 1992	December 8, 1993
Katsuhito Masaki finds his grandson Tenchi looking for the keys to their shrine. Tenchi was able to get them from Katsuhito and went into the shrine, inadvertently releasing a space pirate known as Ryoko, who was defeated by Yosho (First Prince of Jurai) 700 years ago. Tenchi, who falls asleep on the roof of his school, wakes to be chased by Ryoko.
2	"Here Comes Ayeka!"; Transliteration: "Aeka ga Deta!" (Japanese: 阿重霞が出た!)	October 25, 1992	December 29, 1993
Princess Ayeka Masaki Jurai awakens from her sleep and arrives on Earth in pursuit of Ryoko and her half-brother/fiancée Yosho. The battle ensues, and in short order the guardians Azaka and Kamadake capture both Ryoko and Tenchi. Later, while Ayeka sleeps, Tenchi meets her younger sister, Princess Sasami Masaki Jurai, who provides an escape for Tenchi, with the guardians pursuing them both. After a short jail-break, Ryoko joins them on the run from Ayeka's wrath. As the battle continues, Ryo-Ohki forces Ayeka's ship out of orbit into the lake near the Misaki house, destroying both ships.
3	"Hello, Ryo-Ohki!"; Transliteration: "Konnichiwa! Ryōōki-Chan" (Japanese: こんにちは!魎皇鬼ちゃん)	November 25, 1992	February 16, 1994
Ryoko pulls an egg from the wreck of her ship and introduces it as her offspring. The egg hatches to reveal Ryo-Ohki, now in cabbit form. Ayeka discovers signs of Jurai present on Earth, and opens up to Tenchi.
4	"Mihoshi Falls to the Land of Stars"; Transliteration: "Hoshi Furusato ni Mihoshi Furu" (Japanese: 星降る里に美星降る)	December 10, 1992	March 23, 1994
An incompetent Galaxy Police officer, Mihoshi Kuramitsu, is sent to patrol Earth, where the wanted criminal Kagato is headed. Meanwhile, Tenchi and his extended family take a short vacation at a local hot springs, and chaos ensues as Ryoko and Ayeka's fighting destroys the resort and causes Mihoshi's ship to crash, stranding the Galaxy Police officer on Earth.
5	"Kagato Attacks!"; Transliteration: "Kagato Shūrai!" (Japanese: 神我人襲来!)	February 25, 1993	April 27, 1994
The murderous space criminal Kagato arrives on earth and seizes Ryoko, saying that he is her creator. By watching Tenchi's grandfather Katsuhito fight Kagato, Ayeka realizes that Katsuhito is her brother Yosho. He explains that he left Jurai for Earth to escape from racial prejudice and has no intention of returning or marrying her. Tenchi, Ryoko, Ayeka, and Mihoshi chase after him aboard Ryo-Ohki (who has transformed into her spaceship form and combined with the remains of Ayeka's ship, Ryu-Oh).
6	"We Need Tenchi"; Transliteration: "Tenchi Hitsuyō" (Japanese: 天地必要)	March 25, 1993	June 1, 1994
The girls head for Kagato's ship to avenge Tenchi. Meanwhile, on Earth, Sasami senses Tenchi is in trouble and summons Tsunami, her own Juraian battleship, to save him from near-death. Mihoshi accidentally releases a 20,000-year-old scientific genius, Washu, from Kagato's imprisonment, who turns out to be Ryoko's (and Ryo-Ohki's) true creator, and Tenchi returns to face Kagato in a battle to the death.
7	"The Night Before the Carnival"; Transliteration: "O-Matsuri Zenjitsu no Yoru!" (Japanese: お祭り前日の夜!)	September 25, 1993	June 29, 1994
Life after the Kagato incident is still chaotic at the Masaki household. Ayeka, helped by Washu, plants a replacement Ryu-Oh seedling that Tsunami gave Tenchi to grow a new ship. Ryoko and Ayeka, spurred on by reading romantic comic books, try out all kinds of methods of winning Tenchi's love. Resolving to get the competition out of the way, they trick Mihoshi into reporting back to Galaxy Police HQ, and trap Washu in her laboratory in the closet under the stairs. However, Ryoko and Ayeka are soon fighting fist-to-fist over Tenchi again.

=== Second series ===
No.	Title	Original release date	English release date
8	"Hello Baby!"; Transliteration: "Konnichiwa Akachan" (Japanese: こんにちは赤ちゃん)	September 25, 1994	April 27, 1995
Tenchi and the girls are charged with the duty of looking after his baby cousin, Taro, for a few days. As can be expected, chaos ensues and before too long the girls have run themselves ragged. It takes Washu to show them how to care for a baby, but even under her instruction they cannot cope, so Washu takes on the job single-handedly. Washu reveals to Tenchi why she prefers to take the form of a child.
9	"Sasami and Tsunami"; Transliteration: "Sasami to Tsunami" (Japanese: 砂沙美と津名魅)	October 25, 1994	April 27, 1995
Tenchi and family return to the local hot springs resort in need of a holiday, but end up having to repair the place first, since they destroyed it earlier. While working at the inn, the others see a ghostly figure in white. Meanwhile, Sasami is acting oddly, and she has a secret about her past to reveal.
10	"I Love Tenchi"; Transliteration: "Tenchi ga Suki" (Japanese: 天地が好き)	February 25, 1995	June 27, 1995
Ryoko accidentally damages a robe that belonged to Tenchi's late mother. When Tenchi yells at her, he accidentally upsets Ryo-Ohki as well. The heartbroken Ryo-Ohki sulks in Washu's laboratory, where her emotions affect the Mass, a colony of shape-shifting creatures (the same creatures used as a base for Ryoko and Ryo-Ohki). Tenchi apologizes to Ryo-Ohki and picks carrots, but the rest of his friends discover that the Mass have broken out of the lab and make a beeline for Tenchi. Eventually, Ryo-Ohki saves Tenchi by assimilating the Mass, causing her to take on a humanoid form.
11	"The Advent of the Goddess"; Transliteration: "Megami Kōrin" (Japanese: 女神降臨)	March 25, 1995	June 27, 1995
The dastardly Dr. Clay, acting on the orders of the mysterious Lady Tokimi, sends his robotic slave Zero down to earth to capture Washu. Zero transforms into an exact duplicate of Ryoko to infiltrate the Masaki household, but repeatedly fails to carry out her mission as she simply cannot cope with the wave of emotions she experiences when she is near Tenchi.
12	"Zero Ryoko"; Transliteration: "Zero Ryōko" (Japanese: 零・魎呼)	June 25, 1995	December 19, 1995
Zero fails in her mission to capture Washu and returns to Dr. Clay. Tenchi, Ayeka, and Washu pursue her to locate and rescue the real Ryoko. When Washu confronts Dr. Clay, she reveals that she and Clay were once contenders for the director's chair at the Science Academy, but Clay was cast out for misusing his scientific talents. He tries to destroy Tenchi as a means of manipulating Washu, but Zero betrays him and he is forced to destroy his ship to make an escape. Ryoko agrees to assimilate Zero so that she can more easily express her true feelings about Tenchi.
13	"Here Comes Jurai"; Transliteration: "Ō Kitarinaba Sachi Tōkaraji" (Japanese: 皇来たりなば幸遠からじ)	September 25, 1995	December 19, 1995
Tenchi's life is disrupted once again when some visitors from Jurai arrive. Funaho, Tenchi's Juraian great-grandmother, and her sister Misaki, who is also Ayeka and Sasami's mother, are paying a visit to Earth. Funaho has come to see her son Yosho, and to make an interesting offer to Washu. Soon after, Misaki and Funaho's husband, King Azusa of Jurai, arrives and tells Ayeka that she must marry the man he has chosen already, Seiryo. The only way Ayeka can be saved from this fate is for Tenchi to beat him in a duel!
13.5	"Here Comes Jurai 2"	September 25, 1995	December 19, 1995
A short "picture book" episode (vocal track and still images) foreshadowing events in the third OVA series. Mihoshi returns from GPHQ with news of Dr. Clay. Washu carries out an amusing experiment on Ryoko. Elsewhere, Lady Tokimi and D3's interest in Tenchi grows, and a powerful warrior is summoned.

=== Third series ===
No.	Title	Original release date	English release date
14	"Visitor From Afar"; Transliteration: "Enpō Yori Kitarumono" (Japanese: 遠方より来たるモノ)	September 18, 2003	July 5, 2005
The mysterious warrior summoned by D3 and Tokimi is sent to Earth. Meanwhile, Tenchi reminisces about the unusual events in his life that have led him to where he is now, as well as the death of his mother ten years ago. Ryo-Ohki wanders off and gets lost in the woods. After coming to her rescue, Ryoko begins to act more affectionately towards her. The next day, the Masaki household receives a most unexpected visitor.
15	"Fiancée"; Transliteration: "Īnazuke" (Japanese: 許嫁)	December 21, 2003	July 5, 2005
Tenchi is shocked and delighted when he discovers that he has an older sister named Tennyo, but Tennyo's arrival at the Masaki house brings another revelation: Tenchi's arranged fiancée is also on her way! Deciding to get away before this new girl can show up, Tenchi slips off to go and work in the fields, only to end up running into a mysterious green-haired woman named Noike. Could this be the very fiancée that Tenchi was trying to avoid? Whatever the case, it seems that Tenchi's family troubles are only just beginning.
16	"Strategy"; Transliteration: "Tadaima, Kyūyōchū ni Tsuki ~Strategy~ (Currently Resting ~Strategy~)" (Japanese: 唯今、休養中につき〜Strategy〜)	March 27, 2004	July 5, 2005
When Mihoshi's brother Misao gets the mistaken impression that his sister is a prisoner in the harem of the cruel Earthling Tenchi, he decides to head for Earth and wreak destructive vengeance on the entire planet! Fortunately, his adjutant Mashisu is able to divert him from his destructive plans, but it soon becomes clear that this is far from a benevolent act on her part. For Mashisu has proposed another plan, that involves luring Ryoko over to Misao's ship, and destroying her in a planet sized explosion.
17	"Here Comes Misao on The Chobimaru!"; Transliteration: "Misao ga Chobimaru de Yattekita! (Misao Arrives Aboard the Chobimaru!)" (Japanese: 美咲生がチョビ丸でやってきた!)	September 15, 2004	October 17, 2006
Mihoshi's brother Misao develops the notion that his beloved sister is part of a harem run by Tenchi and swears to kill him. However, his adjutant, Mashisu, has other plans for the mission. Meanwhile, the princesses' grandmother, Lady Seto, arrives for a visit, and the family prepare a special meal to welcome her.
18	"Operation: Lovey-Dovey"; Transliteration: "Rabu-Rabu Daisakusen ~Shūen no Hajimari (Lovey-Dovey Epic Battle ~The Beginning of the End~)" (Japanese: ラブラブ大作戦〜終焉の始まり〜)	December 22, 2004	October 17, 2006
The girls fight off Mashisu and her heavy mob, and Ryoko and Ryo-Ohki take on the massive battleship the Chobimaru. Mashisu, meanwhile, is forced to confront her feelings for Misao, and she begs Misao to make a choice between her and his beloved sister.
19	"Z"; Transliteration: "Zetto" (Japanese: Z)	March 16, 2005	April 1, 2012
Lady Tokimi's progeny Z finally moves against Tenchi, and an epic battle in space ensues. However, when the other two chôshin, Tsunami and Washu, discover Z's motivation for wanting to kill Tenchi, they are forced to move against their sister, bringing about a confrontation that threatens to destroy Tenchi, Z and the universe itself.
20	"Final Confrontations"; Transliteration: "Dai-San-Ki Purasu Wan" (Japanese: 第三期プラス1)	September 9, 2005	November 7, 2006
In the aftermath of the Chobimaru incident, the Kuramitsu family meet to discuss the futures of, among others, Mashisu and Misao. Tenchi's family has much to discuss as well, including finally revealing to Tenchi the truth about his mother. More astonishing revelations come to light when Tokimi and Washu reveal the identity of the little girl whose life Tenchi saved.

=== Fourth series ===
No.	Title	Original release date
21	"The Day Before the Party"; Transliteration: "Zenjitsu Utage" (Japanese: 前日宴)	November 30, 2016
As everyone prepares for Nobuyuki and Rea's wedding three days from now, they get a visit from Minaho and her three accountants.
22	"The Masaki Destiny"; Transliteration: "Masaki no Shukumei" (Japanese: 柾木の宿命)	February 22, 2017
As the wedding approaches, Minaho starts bonding with Tenchi, as more guests keep coming.
23	"Oath and Wish"; Transliteration: "Chikai to Yokubō" (Japanese: 誓いと欲望)	May 31, 2017
At last, Nobuyuki and Rea celebrate their wedding, while the Emperor of Jurai discusses with Minaho and Airi about Rea's origins and the reason why she was sent to Earth from the world of Geminar. Rea is one of a number of artificial humans who were created to stop a mech called Gaia from destroying Geminar. Her creators arranged to have one of them sent to Earth so she could produce a powerful hybrid offspring to send to Geminar to stop Gaia.
24	"Good Days, Departure"; Transliteration: "Ii-hi Tabidachi" (Japanese: いい日旅立ち)	September 13, 2017
The Masaki family rejoice with the birth of Nobuyuki and Rea's child, Kenshi. Some years later, Tenchi's family and friends discuss the preparations needed for Kenshi to fulfill his destined mission at Geminar.

=== Fifth series ===
No.	Title	Original release date
25	"Step Mother, Step Sister, Inheritance, and..." Transliteration: "Gibo to Gishi to Isan to..." (Japanese: 義母と義姉と遺産と...)	February 28, 2020
Tennyo and Rea discuss Kiyone and her research into Rea's past as well as Rea's homeworld of Geminar. Five years later, Kenshi plays with Ryo-Ohki and Jovia while Tenchi and Seina discuss building Seina a home across the lake. The group also discuss a place to train Kenshi away from Lady Seto's prying eyes.
26	"Project Eden"; Transliteration: "Rakuen Keikaku" (Japanese: 楽園計画)	May 29, 2020
Kiriko discusses making Earth a permanent home for Seina and his family with her group. Meanwhile, Lady Seto dispatches Kuis to charge Seina with overseeing a proxy war on Tabletop Island. Tenchi and the group arrive on the island and are greeted by Seina.
27	"Welcome to Tabletop Island"; Transliteration: "Banjō Shima e Yōkoso" (Japanese: 盤上島へようこそ)	August 28, 2020
Tenchi uses his powers to protect Tabletop Island from pirates. Meanwhile, Kenshi begins his training.
28	"The Paradise Paradigm"; Transliteration: "Paradaisu・Paradaimu" (Japanese: パラダイス・パラダイム)	November 27, 2020
While Tenchi and Seina thwart another attack on Tabletop Island, Kenshi continues his training.
29	"I am sure you have your opinion on the matter, but please consider the matter closed" Transliteration: "Iroiro go Iken mo o Arideshou ga, Naru Yō ni Natta to Iu Koto de" (Japanese: いろいろご意見もおありでしょうが、なるようになったということで)	February 26, 2021
A few years after the previous episode, Kenshi continues his training against Minaho, Funaho, Misaki and Seto among them. That evening, a large gathering from the Juraian royal family, other royals, the Kuramitsu family and Seina's family meet with Tenchi and the girls to hear Tenchi's decision.
30	"The Max Level (?) Hero Departs"; Transliteration: "Kansuto (?) Yūsha no Tabidachi" (Japanese: カンスト(?)勇者の旅立ち)	May 28, 2021
After Tenchi marries all seven of his girlfriends, Ryoko and Ayeka each bear him a daughter. They raise them while Kenshi continues his training, though his family keeps him blissfully unaware of what he's training for. But when Gaia stirs and they can't afford to wait any longer to do so, Kenshi's family and Tokimi finally prepare to send him to Geminar in his sleep. Tokimi equips him with a failsafe mechanism allowing them to pull him back to their world, never to return, in the event that he would otherwise die there. As soon as they send Kenshi away, the programming Rea's creators put in her that encouraged her to send Kenshi away is finally disabled, and she bursts into tears, futilely calling Kenshi's name. To console her, Washu turns on a video display showing them a live feed of Kenshi's adventures, leading into the events of Tenchi Muyo! War on Geminar.
