= Mamoru Oshii filmography =

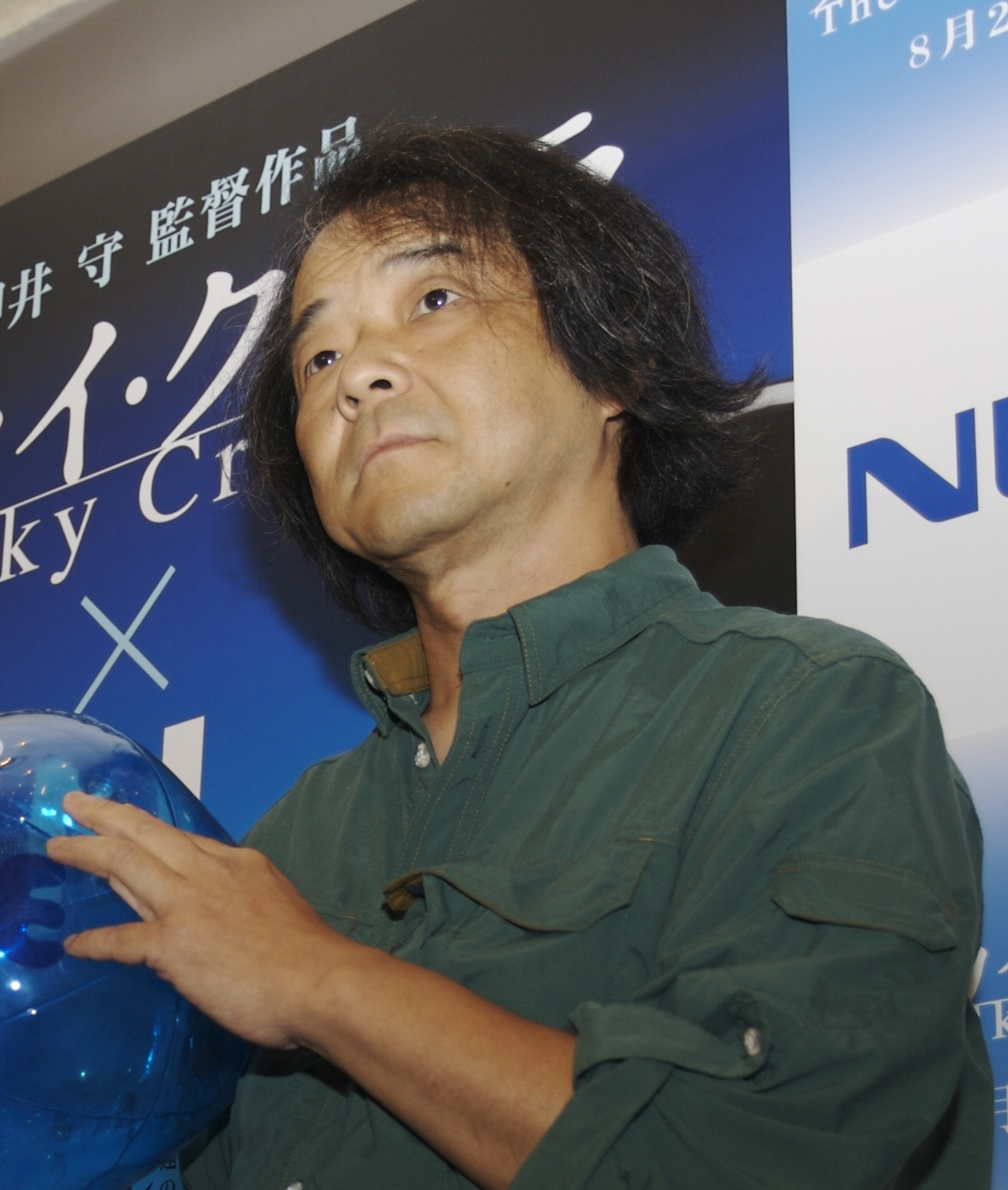
Oshii in 2008

Mamoru Oshii is a prolific Japanese film director, television director, and writer. In a career that has so far spanned more than forty years, Oshii has been involved in directing OVAs, feature films, short films, television series, and radio dramas. His first occupation in the anime industry was as a storyboard artist, and in the 1970s he storyboarded a variety of anime television programs for Tatsunoko Productions. As a writer, Oshii is a frequent screenwriter, and an occasional novelist and manga artist.

Though primarily known as a director of animated films, mostly for Production I.G, Oshii has also been involved in several live-action projects.

== Anime ==
=== Film ===
Year	Title	Director	Writer	Notes
1983	Urusei Yatsura: Only You	Yes	No	
1984	Urusei Yatsura 2: Beautiful Dreamer	Yes	Yes	
1985	Angel's Egg	Yes	Yes	
1989	Patlabor: The Movie	Yes	No	
1990	MAROKO	Yes	Yes	
1993	Patlabor 2: The Movie	Yes	No	
1995	Ghost in the Shell	Yes	No	
1996	G.R.M.: The Record Of Garm War	Yes	No	A conceptual short film that evolved into Garm Wars: The Last Druid
1999	Jin-Roh: The Wolf Brigade	No	Yes	
2004	Ghost in the Shell 2: Innocence	Yes	Yes	
2005	Open Your Mind	Yes	No	Musical drama
2006	Tachiguishi Retsuden	Yes	Yes	
2007	Ani-Kuri 15 – Project Mermaid	Yes	No	Short film
2008	Ghost in the Shell 2.0	Yes	No	
2008	The Sky Crawlers	Yes	No	
2009	Musashi: The Dream of the Last Samurai	No	Yes	Also producer
2010	Je t'aime	Yes	No	Short film, Twelve minutes
TBA	Chimera Kō	Yes	Yes	

=== Other credits ===
Year	Title	Role	Notes
2000	Blood: The Last Vampire	Co-planner (Team Oshii)	
2009	Halo Legends – The Duel	Creative director	Short film
2012	Kick-Heart	Consultant	Short film

=== Television ===
Year	Title	Director	Writer	Notes
1977–1978	Ippatsu Kanta-kun	Yes	No	Directed 2 episodes
1977–1979	Yatterman	Yes	No	Directed 2 episodes
1978–1979	Gatchaman II	Yes	No	Directed 3 episodes
1979–1980	Zenderman	Yes	No	Directed 9 episodes
1980–1981	The Wonderful Adventures of Nils	Yes	No	Directed 18 episodes
1981–1982	Belle and Sebastian	Yes	No	Directed 2 episodes, Also production assistant
1981–1986	Urusei Yatsura	Yes	Yes	Directed 24 episodes, Wrote 7 episodes, Also served as "chief director" from episodes 1 to 106
1983–1984	Mrs. Pepper Pot	No	Yes	1 episode
1989–1990	Patlabor: The TV Series/Mobile Police Patlabor	No	Yes	5 episodes
1990–1992	Patlabor: The New Files	No	Yes	4 episodes
2021	Lupin the 3rd Part 6	No	Yes	2 episodes
2023–2024	The Fire Hunter	No	Yes	

=== Storyboard artist ===
Year	Title	Notes
1977–1978	Ippatsu Kanta-Kun	4 episodes
1977–1979	Yatterman	2 episodes
1978–1979	Gatchaman II	3 episodes
1978–1979	Majokko Tickle	1 episode
1979–1980	Zenderman	10 episodes
1980–1981	The Wonderful Adventures of Nils	11 episodes
1980–1981	Rescueman	6 episodes
1981–1982	Yattodetaman	6 episodes
1981–1982	Belle and Sebastian	2 episodes
1981–1982	Golden Warrior Gold Lightan	2 episodes
1981–1983	Miss Machiko	1 episode
1981–1986	Urusei Yatsura	21 episodes
1983	Urusei Yatsura: Only You	
1981–1986	Dashu Kappei	1 episode
1982–1983	Gyakuten! Ippatsuman	7 episodes
1983–1984	Little Mrs. Pepperpot	1 episode
1983–1985	The Yearling	2 episodes
1983–1984	Dallos	3 episodes
1987	Zillion	3 episodes
1988	Mobile Police Patlabor	All 6 episodes
1989–1990	Gosenzo-sama Banbanzai!	All 6 episodes

=== Other credits ===
Year	Title	Role
2004–2005	Windy Tales	Supervisor
2004	Ghost in the Shell: S.A.C. 2nd GIG	Story concept
2005	Blood+	Co-planner

=== OVAs and ONAs ===
Year	Title	Director	Writer	Notes
1983–1984	Dallos	Yes	Yes	Wrote 3 episodes
1987	Twilight Q	Yes	Yes	Second part, "Mystery Article File 538"
1988	Mobile Police Patlabor	Yes	No	
1989	Gosenzo-sama Banbanzai!	Yes	Yes	
2002	MiniPato: Mobile Police Patlabor Minimum	No	Yes	
2010	009: The Reopening	Yes	No	A promotional short for 009 Re:Cyborg
2020	CONNECTED...	Yes	No	Co-directed with Kōji Morimoto, a promotion for KENWOOD wearable device
2021	Vlad Love	Yes	Yes	

== Live-action ==
=== Film ===
Year	Title	Director	Writer	Notes
1987	The Red Spectacles	Yes	Yes	
1991	StrayDog: Kerberos Panzer Cops	Yes	Yes	
1992	Talking Head	Yes	Yes	
2001	Avalon	Yes	No	
2007	Shin-Onna Tachiguishi Retsuden – The Golden Fish Girl & Assault Girl	Yes	Yes	Also executive producer
2009	Assault Girls	Yes	Yes	
2010	28 1/2 Mousou no Kyojin	Yes	No	
2015	The Next Generation Patlabor: Shuto Kessen	Yes	No	
2015	Tōkyō Mukokuseki Shōjo	Yes	No	
2015	Garm Wars: The Last Druid	Yes	Yes	English-language film
2019	Blood Friends	Yes	No	

Short film

Year	Title	Director	Writer	Notes
2003	Killers – .50 Woman	Yes	Yes	
2006	Onna Tachiguishi Retsuden Ketsune korokke no Ogin: Paresuchina shitō hen	Yes	Yes	
2008	Rebellion: The Killing Isle (aka Kill) – Assault Girl 2	Yes	No	Also executive producer

=== Television ===
Year	Title	Director	Writer	Notes
2008–2009	K-tai Investigator 7	Yes	Yes	Episode 19-20
2014–2015	The Next Generation: Patlabor	Yes	Yes	
2017	Sand Whale and Me	Yes	No	Miniseries

=== Other credits ===
Year	Title	Notes
1987	In the Aftermath	Uses footage from Angel's Egg, which was written and directed by Oshii
2021	We Made a Beautiful Bouquet	Cameo as himself

== Radio drama ==
Year	Title	Director	Writer
1987	While Waiting for the Red Spectacles	Yes	Yes
2006	Kerberos Panzer Jäger	Yes	Yes

== Manga ==
Year	Title	Illustrator
1988–2000	Kerberos Panzer Cop	Kamui Fujiwara
1994–1995	Seraphim 266,613,336 Wings	Satoshi Kon
2003–2005	Kerberos Saga Rainy Dogs	Mamoru Suriura
2006–2007	Kerberos & Tachiguishi	Mamoru Sugiura

== Novel ==
Year	Title
2000	Avalon: Gray Lady
2000	Blood: The Last Vampire: Night of the Beasts
2004	Tachiguishi Retsuden

== Music video ==
Year	Title	Notes
1999	King of My Castle	Single by Wamdue Project. Music video is composed of footage from Ghost in the Shell
1999	You're The Reason	Single by Wamdue Project. Music video is composed of footage from Patlabor 2: The Movie

== Video games ==
Year	Title	Role	Notes
2004	Mobile Police Patlabor Comes Back: MiniPato	Supervisor	
2008	The Sky Crawlers: Innocent Aces	Special consultant	
2025	Death Stranding 2: On the Beach	The Pizza Chef	Likeness only

== Bibliography ==
- Ruh, Brian (2004). Stray Dog of Anime: The Films of Mamoru Oshii. Palgrave Macmillan. ISBN 1403963347
