= Kerberos & Tachiguishi =

Manga

- Kerberos & Tachiguishi ~harahara-dokei no shōjo~
- Compilation volume cover

ケルベロスX立喰師 腹腹時計の少女 (Keruberosu Ekusu Tachiguishi: Harahara-dokei No)
- Genre: Science fiction, Action
- Manga
- Written by: Mamoru Oshii
- Illustrated by: Mamoru Sugiura
- Published by: Tokuma Shoten
- Magazine: Monthly Comic Ryū
- Original run: October 19, 2006 – May 19, 2007
- Volumes: 1
- Related
- Jin-Roh; Tachiguishi-Retsuden

Kerberos & Tachiguishi (ケルベロスX立喰師 腹腹時計の少女, Keruberosu Ekusu Tachiguishi Harahara-dokei No Shōjo; Kerberos and Tachiguishi: Young Lady's Abdomen Biological Clock) is a Kerberos saga manga written by Mamoru Oshii and illustrated by Mamoru Sugiura.

== Plot ==
The story mixes elements of Mamoru Oshii's Kerberos and Tachiguishi lifework. The plot draws a parallel between the Little Red Riding Hood tale's oral version (which is a pre-Grimm version reported by Jean-Baptiste Victor Smith from a Haute-Loire storyteller called Nanette in 1870) and the Kerberos Saga universe, as in the Jin-Roh animated feature. Compared with Jin-Roh the perspective is different, focusing on the Sect side instead of the Kerberos one. The Little Red Riding Hood (赤ずきん, Akazukin) character is now impersonated by Foxy Croquette O-Gin, the legendary female Fast Food Grifter (Tachiguishi in Japanese) also known as Young Lady (少女, Shōjo) in The Red Spectacles. The Big Bad Wolf character remains the Kerberos though.

- Act 1: Iron Clothes (鉄の服, Tetsu no fuku)

A Kerberos (left) under a torii row, and Foxy Croquette O-Gin (right) (Tokuma Shoten, 2007)

A little girl wanted to go meet her mother she had not visited since several years. She had been dressed with iron clothes and had been told that she'll be able to see her mother when her clothes had worn out. Then the little girl rubbed her armour against the walls until it tore. She filled her basket with some milk, bread, cheese and butter and ran away in the woods. At a crossroad she met a wolf who asked her what was her carrying in her basket. The girl answered and the wolf asked her if she could share her meal with him, she refused telling the food was for her mother.

- Act 2: Pins Road and Needles Road (ﾋﾟﾝの道と針の道, Pin no michi to no michi)

The wolf asked the little girl which way would her take, the Pins road or the Needles road. The Needles road she answered, then the wolf took the Needles road fast, found the house, entered it and killed the little girl's mother.

- Act.3 大きな猫と母さんの肉 Pt.1
- Act.4 大きな猫と母さんの肉 Pt.2
- Act.5 小鳥と母さんの血
- Act.6 狼の家 Pt.1
- Act.7 狼の家 Pt.2

== Overview ==
The Kerberos saga manga sidestories were unveiled in Monthly Comic Ryu vol.1, issued in September 2006. The Kerberos and Tachiguishi joint universe first appeared in While Waiting for the Red Spectacles, the 1987 radio drama that launched the Kerberos saga.

Two independent arcs based on these character groups were created with shared reference and characters such as Moongaze Ginji featured in The Red Spectacles live action movie. Later, the "old time gone of tachigui" is referred by Hayashi in the movie's 1991 sequel StrayDog. Jin-Roh, the last episode of the feature trilogy, features a scene referring to the January 1, 1960 Zengakuren-Bund joint communist militants and sympathisans protest in front of the National Diet Building. The same scene is portrayed in the prologue of Kerberos Panzer Cop Vol. 1s 1999 renewed edition, and is referred in Tachiguishi-Retsudens Foxy Croquette O-Gin chapter.

== Related works ==
Kerberos Saga Rainy Dogs is the 1-volume manga following Kerberos Panzer Cop which was itself the comic book adaptation and story extension of the 1987 black and white live-action film The Red Spectacles by Mamoru Oshii.

== Releases ==
=== Serialization ===
The first chapter was published in Japan in the December 2006 issue of Monthly Comic Ryu (月刊 Comic リュウ, #2) monthly comics magazine (26 x 19 cm) owned by Tokuma Shoten.

- 2006~2007: Monthly Comic Ryu (Tokuma Shoten)

2006.12: #2 Kerberos & Tachiguishi (ケルベロス×立喰師 腹腹時計の少女) (color)
2007.01: #3 Kerberos & Tachiguishi (ケルベロス×立喰師 腹腹時計の少女) (color)
2007.02: #4 Kerberos & Tachiguishi (ケルベロス×立喰師 腹腹時計の少女)
2007.03: #5 Kerberos & Tachiguishi (ケルベロス×立喰師 腹腹時計の少女)
2007.04: #6 Kerberos & Tachiguishi (ケルベロス×立喰師 腹腹時計の少女)
2007.05: #7 Kerberos & Tachiguishi (ケルベロス×立喰師 腹腹時計の少女)
2007.06: #8 Kerberos & Tachiguishi (ケルベロス×立喰師 腹腹時計の少女)
2007.07: #9 Kerberos & Tachiguishi (ケルベロス×立喰師 腹腹時計の少女)

=== Volume compilation (A5) ===
The compilation volume was published by Tokuma Shoten.

- 2007.10.20: ケルベロス×立喰師 腹腹時計の少女
  (Keruberosu ekusu Tachiguishi Harahara-dokei no Shōjo, Kerberos and Tachiguishi: Young Lady's Abdomen Biological Clock)

A5, ISBN 4-19-950059-6

== Sources ==
- Gekkan Comic Ryu official website (Japanese)
- Kerberos saga official website (Japanese)
- Mamoru Oshii's official website (Japanese)
