= Yoshikatsu Fujiki =

Japanese actor and voice actor

- 藤木 義勝
- Born: January 20, 1964 (age 61); Toyama prefecture, Japan
- Occupation(s): Actor, voice actor

Yoshikatsu Fujiki (藤木 義勝, Fujiki Yoshikatsu, born January 20, 1964), is a Japanese actor and voice actor. He is known for his roles in the Kerberos saga, as Inui (StrayDog: Kerberos Panzer Cops), Kazuki Fuse (Jin-Roh), and Chuichi Koshiramaru (Tachiguishi-Retsuden), along with his unusual stature of 190 cm and 86 kg. Fujiki was featured in Mamoru Oshii's 2009 live-action film Assault Girls.
