= Kerberos Saga =

Media franchise created by Mamoru Oshii

- Created by: Mamoru Oshii
- Original work: While Waiting for the Red Spectacles (1987)
- Owner: Mamoru Oshii
- Years: 1987–2010

Miscellaneous
- Works: See Release chronology

The Kerberos Saga (ケルベロス・サーガ, Keruberosu Saga) (originally the Kerberos Series (ケルベロス・シリーズ, Keruberosu Shirīzu) or the Kenrō series (犬狼・シリーズ, Kenrou Shirīzu) before at least 2004), also known as Hellhounds overseas, is a Japanese dystopian science fiction political thriller media franchise created and owned by writer and filmmaker Mamoru Oshii. Created in 1987, the Kerberos Saga spans several installments and works, including live action and anime feature films, manga, novels, radio dramas, soundtrack albums, and monographs, as well as diverse merchandise ranging from garage kit model figures to clothing to even Kerberos-branded bottles of wine.

The Kerberos Saga is set in an alternate history postwar Japan where Nazi Germany won World War II, eventually denazified, and occupied Japan, establishing authoritarian rule in the country. It primarily follows the Special Armed Garrison, nicknamed "Kerberos", a heavily-militarized counterterrorist police tactical unit operating in Tokyo, and their tense relations and interactions with their rivals, who range from anti-government terrorist groups to other law enforcement agencies and military units. A defining feature of the saga is its dystopian dieselpunk aesthetic and the "Protect Gears", Wehrmacht-inspired powered exoskeletons worn by members of the Special Armed Garrison, which were designed by Izubuchi.

The saga can be divided into two "story arcs": the "Kerberos arc", the main story that follows the Special Armed Garrison and the organizational politics and interservice rivalries that affect it, as well as the unit's downfall and the aftermath of the few surviving members; and the "Tachiguishi arc", a spin-off largely set in the same universe that follows the tachiguishi ("fast food grifters"), con artists associated with tachigui (立ち食い; "eating while standing up"), a type of Japanese fast-food restaurant or style of eating where patrons stand as opposed to sitting that, in the saga's universe, has been made illegal.

== Setting ==
The Kerberos Saga is set in an alternate history 20th century. In this timeline, the United States maintained its policy of non-interventionism through both World War I and World War II, and the Empire of Japan joined the Allies of World War II instead of the Axis powers. In the Kerberos Saga's version of World War II, Nazi Germany manages to develop advanced technology during the war, most prominently "Protect Gears", heavily-armored powered exoskeletons that distinctively feature a Stahlhelm and a gas mask with glowing red lenses. These advances allow Germany to defeat the Allies, most prominently the Soviet Union by using the Protect Gears during the Battle of Stalingrad, and Japan through the atomic bombings of Hiroshima and Nagasaki. However, the 20 July plot, when Claus von Stauffenberg attempted to assassinate Adolf Hitler with a bomb during a meeting in 1944 (a failure in real life), succeeds, leading to a complete purge of Nazism from the German Reich and the restoration of the Weimar Republic, though authoritarianism remains dominant. A now denazified Germany occupies Japan and, by the postwar economic boom, shifts course in the occupation and sets up a new government called the "Weimar Establishment" (ワイマール体制, waimāru taisei) to modernize and globalize Japan, allowing it to take advantage of the growing economy. However, this also exacerbates class stratification and urbanization, leading to the growth of anti-government movements that often resort to terrorism.

Terrorism and crime soon become a major issue by the late 1940s and the 1950s, with police unable to handle riots and terrorist attacks, but limitations on the new Constitution of Japan forbidding the deployment of the Japan Self-Defense Forces to effectively quell the violence. The Japanese government thus establishes the Metropolitan Security Police Organization (commonly "Metropolitan Police" (MP) or Shutokei (首都警); "Capital Police" or "CAPO" in English), a paramilitary police force tasked with maintaining order in Tokyo and countering terrorism; to ensure this can be conducted effectively, the Metropolitan Police's elite Special Armed Garrison ("Special Unit" in English), nicknamed "Kerberos", is issued advanced military equipment, including Protect Gears, and is authorized to use violent force against suspects. The Metropolitan Police and Kerberos succeed in countering and defeating Japan's anti-government terrorist groups, forcing them to merge under a single movement called "the Sect".

However, the Metropolitan Police faces external friction from the Self-Police ("Local Police", "Metropolitan Police Force", or "NPA" in English)—officially the Tokyo Metropolitan Self-Police Department, whose jurisdiction overlaps with the Metropolitan Police—as well as the JSDF, while Kerberos's division, the Defense Division ("Capital Area Security Police Agency" in English), experiences interservice tensions with the Metropolitan Police's intelligence agency-like espionage unit, the Public Security Division. Over time into the 1950s, as Japanese living standards improve, the Sect's public favor plummets, and Kerberos becomes increasingly brutal, the necessity of Kerberos in Japanese society comes into question. This ultimately culminates in the "Kerberos Uprising" or "Kerberos Riot", an incident analogous to the 1877 Satsuma Rebellion, when Kerberos, deducing that the government and police intend to get rid of them but refusing to disband, launches an attempted coup d'état that fails when the JSDF repels it, leading to the deaths of all of the Kerberos members and the disbandment of the unit.

=== Characters and organizations ===
The primary organizations of the Kerberos Saga are the Metropolitan Security Police Organization, a paramilitary counterterrorist police organization operating in Tokyo; the Self-Police, the local police forces of municipalities and prefectures, most prominently the Tokyo Metropolitan Self-Police Department; and the Japanese Self-Defense Forces. The Metropolitan Police is divided into two divisions: the Defense Division, the main armed branch of the Metropolitan Police, consisting of the Special Armed Garrison and the Aerial Squadron; and the Public Security Division, the espionage division. Within the Special Armed Garrison itself is "Jin-Roh" ("Wolf Brigade" in English), a secret counterintelligence unit that seeks to protect its existence. The 2006 radio drama Kerberos Panzer Jäger also follows the Wehrmacht which, after the restoration of the Weimar Republic, is reformed into the Reichswehr.

By the time of the works in the series, most anti-government terrorist groups in Japan have combined under the Sect, a left-wing terrorist group. A major part of the Sect is the "Little Red Riding Hoods", a courier unit that consists of young girls wearing red clothing who smuggle and move materiel such as explosives for the Sect, using their unassuming and non-threatening appearances to get past police without being searched or attracting attention. Other minor terrorist groups and non-violent movements are mentioned or shown, such as the Four Seasons League, a communist terrorist group based on the Japanese Red Army.

Most works in the saga follow members of the Metropolitan Police and the Special Armed Garrison, major protagonists from these factions including Koichi Todome, Washio Midori, Soichiro Toribe, Toru Inui, and Kazuki Fuse. Members of other factions that make prominent appearances in the saga include Public Security Division agents, Sect members, Little Red Riding Hoods, tachiguishi, and assorted terrorists and civilians. Characters from Oshii's other works make occasional guest appearances and cameos, such as tachiguishi or Detective Takahiro Matsui from the Patlabor franchise.

=== Main locations ===
The main location of the Kerberos Saga is Tokyo, the jurisdiction of the Metropolitan Police and the Special Armed Garrison. Wards and districts of Tokyo, such as Odaiba, Shibuya, and Akasaka, are common settings for scenes and events, as are landmarks and key locations such as Tokyo International Airport, the Tokyo Tower, the Prime Minister's Official Residence, the University of Tokyo's Yasuda Auditorium, Mount Fuji, and the Tokyo Metropolitan Self-Police Department headquarters, which are for the most part unmodified from their real appearances in the mid-20th century. These landmarks also help set the work's period; for example, although dates in the series are usually not explicitly stated (Kerberos Panzer Cop, for instance, uses the year "19XX"), works implied to be set in the early 1950s such as Jin-Roh: The Wolf Brigade do not feature the Tokyo Tower, which began construction in 1957 and was completed in 1958, in establishing shots.

Some works in the saga are also partially or fully set outside Japan, such as the cities of Taipei and Tainan, Taiwan (StrayDog: Kerberos Panzer Cops); Old Havana, Cuba (Kerberos Saga Rainy Dogs); and Stalingrad, Soviet Union (Kerberos Panzer Jäger).

=== Recurring themes ===
Dogs are often used as allegories in the Kerberos Saga, most prominently stray dogs and mythological dogs. The name of the saga itself, as well as the Special Armed Garrison's nickname, is taken from the Greek romanization of "Cerberus" (Κέρβερος, Kérberos), a multi-headed dog in Greek mythology that serves as the guard dog of hell and appears on the Special Armed Garrison's insignia. References and metaphors relating to dogs are also common in works such as Kerberos Panzer Cop. Other references to canines include the titles of StrayDog: Kerberos Panzer Cops (the title sequence of which includes several photos of stray dogs), Jin-Roh: The Wolf Brigade (the titular organization also being a reference to canines), and Kerberos Saga Rainy Dogs.

Sewers and similar areas are recurring locations in the saga. Aside from their frequent use by terrorists such as the Sect, they are commonly the location where a Special Armed Garrison member sees combat, often for the last time (either in the work they appear in or in their life); notably, in Jin-Roh, Kazuki Fuse's first appearance is in a shootout in a sewer, and his final battle is in roughly the same area. The Tokyo Self-Police compound where Kerberos is depicted to fight their last stand in StrayDog also vaguely resembles a sewer on the inside. Junkyards are also recurring locations in the final scenes of works such as Kerberos Panzer Cop and Jin-Roh, commonly associated with death or the end of some sort of era.

"Little Red Riding Hood", a European fairy tale about a young girl in a distinctive red cloak who is deceived and killed by a wolf disguised as a loved one, is frequently referenced throughout the saga. The Sect's "Little Red Riding Hoods" in particular directly reference this, being composed of young female couriers who wear red clothing and deceive others into thinking they are innocent, and some members are shown to be part of complex deception operations. The fairy tale itself is also directly invoked in Jin-Roh, and Kerberos & Tachiguishi borrows parts of the tale for its own story.

== Release chronology ==
=== Kerberos story arc ===
- 1987 : While Waiting for the Red Spectacles (紅い眼鏡を待ちつつ), Radio drama
- 1987 : The Red Spectacles (紅い眼鏡), Live-action tokusatsu feature film
  - 2024 : The Red Spectacles (紅い眼鏡), Manga adaptation of the 1987 film
- 1988 : Kerberos Panzer Cop (犬狼伝説), Manga
- 1991 : StrayDog: Kerberos Panzer Cops (ケルベロス 地獄の番犬), Live-action tokusatsu feature film
- 1999 : Jin-Roh: The Wolf Brigade (人狼), Animated feature film
  - 2018 : Illang: The Wolf Brigade (인랑), Korean live-action remake
- 2003 : The Killers (キラーズ), Manga short story
- 2003 : Kerberos Saga Rainy Dogs (Rainy Dogs 紅い足痕), Manga
- 2005 : Kerberos Saga Rainy Dogs (犬狼伝説 紅い足痕), Graphic collection (with "The Killers" and the previously unreleased "Act00")
- 2006 : Kerberos Panzer Jäger (ケルベロス 鋼鉄の猟犬), Radio drama
- 2006 : Kerberos & Tachiguishi (ケルベロスX立喰師 腹腹時計の少女), Manga
- 2009 : Kerberos Panzer Cops: Tokyo War (ケルベロス 東京市街戦 首都警特機隊全記録), Monograph (with Special Issue)
- 2009 : Kerberos Panzer Cop: Special Issue (前夜-ケルベロス騒乱異聞), Manga short story
- 2010 : Kerberos Panzer Cop: A Revision (犬狼伝説 20周年エディション), Graphic collection collecting revised Volume 1 and 2, with Special Issue

=== Tachiguishi story arc ===
- 1984 : Urusei Yatsura: Hisatsu! Tachigui Wars!! (うる星やつら ~必殺! 立ち食いウォーズ!!~), Television anime series episode (ep. 99)
- 1987 : While Waiting for the Red Spectacles (紅い眼鏡を待ちつつ), Radio drama
- 2004 : Tachiguishi-Retsuden (立喰師列伝), Novel
  - 2006 : Tachiguishi-Retsuden (立喰師列伝), Live-action/animated hybrid feature adaptation of the novel
- 2006 : Onna Tachiguishi-Retsuden (女立喰師外伝 ケツネコロッケのお銀), Short film
- 2006 : Kerberos & Tachiguishi (ケルベロスX立喰師 腹腹時計の少女), Manga
- 2007 : Shin-Onna Tachiguishi Retsuden (真女立喰師列伝), Short film

=== Anniversary releases ===
In 2006, to celebrate the Kerberos Saga's 20th anniversary (the production of The Red Spectacles and While Waiting for the Red Spectacles began in 1986):

- A new design of Protect Gear, the Type 34 "Wolfpelz" designed by Jun Suemi, was revealed for a new entry in the saga. This was later revealed to be the radio drama Kerberos Panzer Jäger, which aired the same year and covers the saga's timeline during World War II.
- The Kerberos Saga official website was launched, including an online store for merchandise.
- A Kerberos Panzer Jäger-branded bottle of Riesling German white wine was released in limited quantities through the online store.

In 2010, to celebrate approximately 20 years since the release of the Kerberos Panzer Cop Original Edition volume compilation in 1990, publisher Gakken released a collector boxset titled Kerberos Panzer Cop a Revision: 20th edition (犬狼伝説 20周年エディション), a digitally refined and corrected reissue of the entire manga re-illustrated by original manga illustrator Kamui Fujiwara, alongside a special pamphlet and a Revoltech Protect Gear model figure.

== Releases ==
=== Japanese releases ===
The saga started in January 1987 with the Japanese broadcast of the radio drama series While Waiting for the Red Spectacles (紅い眼鏡を待ちつつ, Akai megane o machi tsutsu), prior to the theatrical release of the live-action film The Red Spectacles (紅い眼鏡, Akai megane). A manga series adaptation, Kerberos Panzer Cop (Kenrou densetsu) started the following year and was compiled as a single volume (Acts 1~4) in 1990.

The following year was released StrayDog: Kerberos Panzer Cops (ケルベロス 地獄の番犬, Keruberosu jigoku no banken), the first theatrical adaptation of the manga.

In 1999, the manga series was completed (Acts 5~8) and re-released as two compilation volumes. A few months later, Jin-Roh (人狼, Jinrou), the anime adaptation of the first manga, was released. It remains the franchise's most popular work outside Japan until today.

Tachigui: The Amazing Lives of the Fast Food Grifters (立喰師外伝, Tachiguishi retsuden), an animation feature spin-off, was released in theaters and DVD in 2006.

=== Asian releases ===
Kerclros Panzer Cop 犬狼伝説, an unlicensed Chinese version of the 1990 manga volume was published in Taiwan in the early 1990s.

犬狼傳說, a Chinese version complete volume (Acts 1~8) was available in Malaysia in 2000. A licensed, two volumes, Chinese version of the Japanese 2000 re-edition ("Frozen Version") was issued in Hong Kong the same year. A similar edition was available in the Korean language in South Korea the same year.

A traditional Chinese 2-volume licensed edition was published in Taiwan in 2002.

=== North American releases ===
A six-issues English adaptation of the first manga volume was published in 1994, in the United States and Canada as Hellhounds: Panzer Cops. A compilation volume edition was published in 1997.

The English dubbed version of Jin-Roh was released in North America in 2001.

Two years later, the English subtitled version of the 1987 and 1991 live-action films was released on DVD.

In 2024, Discotek Media released Tachigui: The Amazing Lives of the Fast Food Grifters on Blu-ray.

=== European releases ===
Hellhounds: Panzer Cops, the English adaptation of the first manga volume, was translated into German and serialized from 1996 to 1997.

In 1998, the American Hellhounds: Panzer Cops all-in-one volume was licensed and distributed in the United Kingdom.

The following year, Jin-Roh was premiered in France and later released in Germany. It was one year before the Japanese release.

=== Toy lines ===
Japanese toys and model kits manufacturers such as Kaiyodo, Medicom, and Takara produce Protect Gear scale models.

=== Fan works ===
In 2005, Images of the Last Battalion, an independent short CG anime directed by a student, Koichi Kishita, was released in Japanese film contests. The following year, the video was edited and projected as an official trailer at Mamoru Oshii's Kerberos Panzer Jäger launch party and Kishita joined Production I.G's 3DCG team.

Japanese and Chinese Protect Gear fans sculpt, modify, or repaint licensed toys. Some of these "custom" items are released as limited edition garage kits available in conventions and import action figure shops and websites.

== See also ==
- Patlabor – similar series created by Headgear, of which Mamoru Oshii and Yutaka Izubuchi are members
- Starship Troopers – 1959 science fiction novel that popularized the idea of powered exoskeletons

== Sources ==
- Axis Animation (English)
- GA Graphic official website (Japanese)
- Images of the Last Battalion@Digital Frontier Grand Prix 2005 (Japanese)
- Jin-Roh DTS Edition booklet, Bandai Visual (Japanese)
- Jin-Roh Maniaxx, Kadokawa Shoten, ISBN 4-04-853219-7 (Japanese)
- JOQR Radio (Japanese)
- Kenji Kawai official English website (English)
- Kenji Kawai's official website (Japanese/English)
- Kenrou Densetsu Fukyoban, Nihon Shuppansha, ISBN 4-89048-402-7 (Japanese)
- Kenrou Densetsu, Nihon Shuppansha, ISBN 4-89048-271-7 (Japanese)
- Kerberos Panzer Jäger official website (Japanese)
- Kerberos Panzer Jäger@Raiden Kinema channel 2 (Japanese)
- Kerberos Panzer Jäger@Raiden Kinema channel 9 (Japanese)
- Kerberos saga at the Hobby Japan website (Japanese)
- Mamoru Oshii's official website (Japanese)
- Monthly Comic Ryu official website (Japanese)
- Production I.G official English website (English)
- Production I.G Special Site (Japanese)
- Watch Impress (Japanese)
