= Kerberos Saga Rainy Dogs =

Japanese manga series

- Original edition with promo obi (2005)

犬狼伝説 紅い足痕 (Kenrō Densetsu Akai Ashiato)
- Genre: Science fiction, Action
- Manga
- Written by: Mamoru Oshii
- Illustrated by: Mamoru Sugiura
- Published by: Kadokawa
- Magazine: Ace Tokunoh
- Original run: May 2003 – July 2004
- Volumes: 1
- Related works
- Kerberos Panzer Cop; StrayDog: Kerberos Panzer Cops; Killers; "The Killers" (short story); Golgo 13

Kerberos Saga Rainy Dogs (Japanese: 犬狼伝説 紅い足痕, Hepburn: Kenrou Densetsu Akai Ashiato; lit. "Dog-Wolf Legend: The Red Footsteps") is an alternate history political thriller manga written by Mamoru Oshii and illustrated by Mamoru Sugiura, running from 2003 to 2004. Part of the Kerberos Saga, it is a sequel to Oshii's manga Kerberos Panzer Cop (for which Sugiura was in charge of managing the series' continuity) and a prequel to the 1991 film StrayDog: Kerberos Panzer Cops.

Set after the failed Kerberos Uprising by the Special Armed Garrison "Kerberos", Rainy Dogs follows former Kerberos member Koichi Todome as he pursues former Kerberos sniper Eito Kurosaki across Asia, seeking revenge for the latter's betrayal during the Uprising.

Also included in Rainy Dogs is "The Killers" (キラーズ, kirāzu), an independent short story based on Ernest Hemingway's short story of the same name and set in the Kerberos Saga universe.

== Plot ==
Eito Kurosaki during the Kerberos Riot (top, right). Hayashi (bottom left) (Act 00).

Kerberos Saga Rainy Dogs is set in the Kerberos Saga's alternate timeline, where Nazi Germany won World War II, eventually denazified and restored the Weimar Republic, and occupied Japan (part of the Allies in this timeline) to establish authoritarian rule; however, their attempts at establishing a new government led to increased poverty and class stratification, resulting in the rise of anti-government movements and terrorism, most predominantly the Sect. In response, the Japanese government formed the Metropolitan Security Police Organization to counter the terrorists and restore order to Tokyo. The Metropolitan Police's Special Armed Garrison ("Special Unit" in English), nicknamed "Kerberos", was profoundly effective in defeating the terrorists and the Sect, but found themselves facing friction from the Self-Police ("Local Police", "Metropolitan Police Force", or "NPA" in English) as well as the Public Security Division, the Metropolitan Police's intelligence agency-like espionage unit. Eventually, a series of violent incidents led to the government ordering their dissolution, but the members of Kerberos resisted in the "Kerberos Uprising", an attempted coup d'état that was ultimately crushed by the Japan Ground Self-Defense Force. Only three Kerberos members—Koichi Todome, Washio Midori, and Soichiro Toribe—fled the Uprising alive, but only Todome was ultimately able to escape.

Rainy Dogs is set during and after the Kerberos Uprising, and follows Todome as he pursues elite Kerberos sniper Eito Kurosaki, nicknamed the "Afghan Hound". Kurosaki, a former friend and comrade of Todome, betrayed Kerberos by alerting Public Security of the Uprising's planning, allowing them and the Self-Police to respond to the Uprising and ultimately defeat it; during the Uprising, Kurosaki escaped in a helicopter and fled overseas. Seeking revenge for his betrayal, Todome pursues Kurosaki across Asia.

=== The Killers (キラーズ) ===
"The Killers" (キラーズ, kirāzu) is an independent short story included in Rainy Dogs, based on Ernest Hemingway's short story of the same name.

In the restaurant "Papa's Lunch Room" in Havana, Cuba, multiple people—a yakuza in a tuxedo, a middle-aged bearded man in a cassock, an old smartly-dressed violinist, and hitman Golgo 13—wait silently at separate tables. When two black-clad Latinos enter, a young boy delivers a package to Golgo 13, who brings it with him into the washroom; the Latinos suddenly attack the restaurant's chef and waitress and draw firearms, asking about Koichi Todome. When Golgo 13 reemerges with his trademark scoped M16 rifle, the other men draw their own weapons and battle, but ultimately end up killing each other. The waitress, who survived the shootout, unbinds the chef and heads to a hotel in the outskirts of the city, where she alerts the occupant of room 203: Koichi Todome himself.

== Related works ==
=== Kerberos Panzer Cop ===
Kerberos Saga Rainy Dogs is the follow-up to the 1988~2000 manga Kerberos Panzer Cop written by Mamoru Oshii and illustrated by Kamui Fujiwara. Flashback sequences from the Kerberos Panzer Cop key event called "Kerberos Riot" are depicted in Rainy Dogs.

=== StrayDog: Kerberos Panzer Cops ===
The plot of Kerberos Saga Rainy Dogs happens before the events depicted in StrayDog, Koichi left Latin America with his suitcase and is now living in Taiwan.

=== Killers ===
The short story "The Killers" was published prior to Rainy Dogs and in order to coincide with the theater release of Mamoru Oshii's eponymous live-action compilation movie Killers.

=== The Killers ===
Mamoru Oshii's "The Killers"is a parody of the eponymous classic short story by American writer Ernest Hemingway published in 1927. Russian filmmaker Andrei Tarkovsky, a known influence of Oshii, adapted The Killers for the screen in 1956 as his first student short film.

=== Golgo 13 ===
The yakuza character "Togo 13" appearing in "The Killers" is a cameo of Golgo 13 from the eponymous franchise, who often uses the "Togo" alias.

== Issues ==
Like its prequel, Kerberos Saga Rainy Dogs was first serialized in a B5 comics magazine before to be published as a compilation volume.

=== Ace Tokunoh serialization (B5) ===
Kerberos Saga Rainy Dogs was first published in Ace Tokunoh (エース特濃, Esu Tokunou), a comic magazine owned by Kadokawa Shoten.

- 2003.05: Ace Tokunoh vol.1

The Killers
キラーズ

- 2003.06: Ace Tokunoh vol.2

Kerberos Saga Rainy Dogs - Act 01: Break Up
Rainy Dogs 紅い足痕

- 2003.0X: Ace Tokunoh vol.3

Kerberos Saga Rainy Dogs - Act 02: Technical Shot
Rainy Dogs 紅い足痕

- 2003.09: Ace Tokunoh vol.4

Kerberos Saga Rainy Dogs - Act 03: Bank Shot
Rainy Dogs 紅い足痕

- 2003.0X: Ace Tokunoh vol.5

Kerberos Saga Rainy Dogs - Act 04: Cannon Shot
Rainy Dogs 紅い足痕

- 2004.01: Ace Tokunoh vol.6

Kerberos Saga Rainy Dogs - Act 05: Hug Shot (color)
Rainy Dogs 紅い足痕 (color)

- 2004.0X: Ace Tokunoh vol.7

Kerberos Saga Rainy Dogs - Act 06: Follow Shot
Rainy Dogs 紅い足痕

- 2004.05: Ace Tokunoh vol.8

Kerberos Saga Rainy Dogs - Act 07: Time Shot
Rainy Dogs 紅い足痕

- 2004.07: Ace Tokunoh vol.9

Kerberos Saga Rainy Dogs - Act 08: Eight Ball Shot
Rainy Dogs 紅い足痕

=== Original edition (A5) ===
The compilation volume was published by Kadokawa in its "New Type 100% Comics" collection (ニュータイプ100%コミックス). The dusk cover features a red obi with the manga's international title "Kerberos Saga Rainy Dogs". The previously unreleased prologue "Act 00: Set Up" was added to help in the understanding of the complex background and the 2003 short story "The Killers" (first issued in Ace Tokunoh vol.1) was also included as an epilogue.

- 2005.10.26: Kerberos Saga: Rainy Dogs

犬狼伝説 紅い足痕
A5 (384p.) Kadokawa Shoten
ISBN 4-04-853780-6
