= Kerberos Panzer Cop =

Japanese manga series

- Original edition with promo obi for StrayDog (1990)

犬狼伝説 (Kenrō Densetsu)
- Manga
- Written by: Mamoru Oshii
- Illustrated by: Kamui Fujiwara
- Published by: Kasakura Shuppansha; Nihon Shuppansha; Kadokawa Shoten; Gakken
- Magazine: Amazing Comics; Combat Comic; Shōnen Ace
- Original run: October 1988 –: January 2000; March 2009 (special issue)
- Volumes: 2
- Manga

Kerberos Saga Rainy Dogs
- Written by: Mamoru Oshii
- Illustrated by: Mamoru Sugiura
- Published by: Kadokawa Shoten
- Magazine: Ace Tokunoh
- Original run: May 2003 – July 2004
- Volumes: 1
- Films
- StrayDog (1991 live-action); Jin-Roh (1999)
- Related works
- While Waiting for the Red Spectacles; The Red Spectacles; Kerberos Panzer Jäger; Kerberos & Tachiguishi

Kerberos Panzer Cop, also known as Hellhounds Legend (Japanese: 犬狼伝説, Hepburn: Kenrō Densetsu; lit. 'Legend of Dogs and Wolves') and Hellhounds: Panzer Cops, or just Hellhounds overseas, is a Japanese alternate history political thriller manga series written by Mamoru Oshii and illustrated by Kamui Fujiwara with mechanical designs by Yutaka Izubuchi, running from 1988 to January 2000. Part of the Kerberos Saga and set before Oshii's 1987 film The Red Spectacles, the manga details the history and events surrounding the Special Armed Garrison, nicknamed "Kerberos", a Tokyo-based counterterrorist police tactical unit operating in an alternate history authoritarian postwar Japan.

Part I (Act 1~4) of Kerberos Panzer Cop was published in various Japanese comic magazines from 1988 to 1990, it was later completed with Part II (Act 5~8) published in Monthly Shōnen Ace from 1999 to 2000. Translated versions of the complete series were issued in South Korea, Hong Kong, Macau, Malaysia and Taiwan in the early 2000s. An English language adaptation of the first four acts was published under the title Hellhounds: Panzer Cops in 1994 by Dark Horse Comics. The American translators from Studio Protheus, Alan Gleason and Toren Smith, randomly used the alternative titles Hellhounds (Cerberos: Panzer Cop) and Hellhounds. This adaptation was later issued in the United Kingdom by Diamond Comic Distributors in 1998, and a translated version was published in the German magazine Manga Power in 1996.

In 2009, an omake-style issue, Kerberos Panzer Cop: Special Issue (前夜-ケルベロス騒乱異聞, Zenya - Keruberosu Sōran Ibun), was published in Kerberos Panzer Cops: Tokyo War, the Kerberos Saga's definitive guide. In April 2010, for the 20th anniversary of the Original Edition (1990 volume compilation), publisher Gakken issued Kerberos Panzer Cop a Revision: 20th Edition (犬狼伝説 20周年エディション), a digitally refined and corrected reissue of the entire manga, alongside a special pamphlet and a Protect Gear model figure.

Kerberos Panzer Cop has been adapted into films twice: first in 1991's StrayDog: Kerberos Panzer Cops, directed by Oshii, loosely based on the manga's premise; and again in 1999's Jin-Roh: The Wolf Brigade, directed by Hiroyuki Okiura and written by Oshii, based on Act I of the manga. A sequel, Kerberos Saga Rainy Dogs, was serialized in Ace Tokunoh magazine from 2003 to 2005, then published as an extended single volume in 2005.

== Plot ==
=== Setting ===
Kerberos Panzer Cop is set in the 1950s in the Kerberos Saga's alternate timeline, where Nazi Germany won World War II, eventually denazified and restored the Weimar Republic, and occupied Japan (part of the Allies in this timeline) to establish authoritarian rule. In the late 1940s and early 1950s, the German occupation attempts to globalize and urbanize Japan through a government called the "Weimar Establishment" (ワイマール体制, Waimāru Taisei), sparking massive increases in poverty and class stratification and resulting in the rise of anti-government movements that escalate into terrorism when their protests are met with repression. The Japanese government, unable to effectively handle rising terrorism and violence using regular police, but unable and unwilling to deploy the Japan Self-Defense Forces, forms the Metropolitan Security Police Organization (commonly "Metropolitan Police" (MP) or Shutokei (首都警; "Capital Police" or "CAPO" in English) to counter the terrorists and restore order to Tokyo. The Metropolitan Police's main combat force, the paramilitary Special Armed Garrison ("Special Unit" in English), nicknamed "Kerberos", are issued powerful military equipment such as MG 42 machine guns and powered exoskeletons called "Protect Gears", and are permitted to use deadly force against their targets.

The Metropolitan Police and Kerberos succeed in their goals, quelling the spike in terrorism and forcing most of the terrorist groups to merge under a single group called the Sect. However, the Metropolitan Police faces friction from the Self-Police ("Local Police", "Metropolitan Police Force", or "NPA" in English)—officially the Tokyo Metropolitan Self-Police Department, whose jurisdiction overlaps with the Metropolitan Police—as well as the JSDF, while Kerberos's division, the Defense Division ("Capital Area Security Police Agency" in English), experiences interservice tensions with the Metropolitan Police's intelligence agency-like espionage unit, the Public Security Division. Additionally, into the 1950s, changes in Japanese society over time—improving living standards, the loss of the Sect's public appeal, and Kerberos's increasingly brutal tactics—lead to the necessity of Kerberos being brought into question.

=== Part I (第一部, Dai Ichibu) ===
- Prologue (プロローグ, Purorōgu)

A dedicated prologue to the manga, detailing the setting and history of the saga's fictional universe, as well as why the Metropolitan Police were formed. In the English adaptation, this is replaced by a single-page synopsis with no illustrations nor references to Japan, which is simply referred to as "the country".

- Act 1: The Forsaken Dog (突入, Suteinu)

A page from Act 1 as seen in the English translation, Hellhounds

Metropolitan Police rookie Toru Inui, part of Kerberos, engages with Sect terrorists in the storm sewers of Tokyo, but fails to kill a suicide bomber and is unable to apprehend a suspicious wounded man escaping through a manhole with an innocent woman; the man is shot by Metropolitan Police snipers and revealed to be an armed terrorist. Unsure why he was unable to perform his duties and doubting his ability to work in Kerberos, Inui is transferred back into training for reevaluation. When he is brought back to field duty as his unit's rearguard, he encounters the same woman escorting another injured man. Before he can act, the woman reveals herself to be a terrorist and shoots Inui, killing him.

- Act 2: The Hound "Jagdhund" (猟犬 ~ヤクトハウンド~, Ryōken ~Yakutohaundo~)

Metropolitan Police Aerial Squadron pilot Hachiro Kishu is assigned to aerial reconnaissance and traffic enforcement in a Focke-Achgelis Fa 330, much to his dismay, as he dreams of experiencing real aerial combat. However, this changes when the Aerial Squadron receives a new Fa-666 "Jagdhund" attack helicopter, and Kishu is assigned to pilot it. Meanwhile, the Metropolitan Police Public Security Division attempts to apprehend a Sect mole within the Metropolitan Police, but a Kerberos platoon interrupts their operation by raiding an accomplice's house, killing several Sect members but losing the mole. When the Public Security agents inform their director Bunmei Muroto of what happened, they learn the Sect plans to sabotage the Fa-666 in an upcoming aerial demonstration; however, Muroto chooses not to inform the Metropolitan Police Defense Division out of retaliation for their botched operation. The Sect mole, revealed to be a Metropolitan Police aircraft mechanic, plants a bomb aboard the Fa-666 and detonates it during the demonstration, destroying the helicopter and Kishu's aspirations.

- Act 3: The Stray Dog (野犬, Yaken)

Public Security Division director Bunmei Muroto, realizing society has evolved to the point that it will eventually no longer need Kerberos, and deciding there is no room for them in the Metropolitan Police anyway, begins to work against it. He proposes to merge Public Security with the Self-Police to create "a new public peacekeeping apparatus that has the Public Security Division at its core", and implies this move would dismantle Kerberos. However, knowing Defense Division director Isao Aniya and Kerberos leader Shiro Tatsumi would view this as betrayal and attempt to strike back, Muroto realizes he must discredit or eliminate Kerberos for the merger to go ahead. After meeting with Self-Police officials, he accuses an underling, Tsujimura, of leaking secrets to a friend in Kerberos; however, as Public Security agents arrive to apprehend him, Tsujimura unmasks Muroto's ambitions and draws a gun on him, prompting the agents to shoot and kill Tsujimura. Later, a stray dog finds Tsujimura's corpse in a junkyard surrounded by decommissioned Stahlhelms, Protect Gears, firearms, and armoured personnel carriers from Kerberos lying throughout, with the gleaming office buildings of Tokyo prominently visible in the distance, symbolizing the coming of a new era without Kerberos.

- Act 4: The Fighting Dog - Chapter I (戦闘犬 - I 端緒, Sentoken - I Tansho)

The Sect attacks the German Embassy in Japan, taking several hostages and threatening to kill them, which could spark an international incident; Kerberos is deployed to handle the crisis, and they storm the embassy, eliminating the terrorists within minutes. However, it is learned that the attack was not the work of the Sect, but rather the Four Seasons League, a communist terrorist splinter group (loosely based on the Japanese Red Army) formed after the Sect's leadership, making a compromise with the government while in custody, agreed to abandon its most extreme and violent members, including radical Fujiwara, who promptly formed the group. The Metropolitan Police are then alerted that Fujiwara and the Four Seasons League have hijacked Lufthansa Flight 666, a Focke-Wulf Fw 200 Condor, at Tokyo International Airport, and that the embassy crisis was a diversion to draw police attention away from the hijacking. The Four Seasons League intend to face off with Kerberos.

- Act 4: The Fighting Dog - Chapter II (戦闘犬 - II 対峙, Sentoken - II Taiji)

Kerberos is charged with defeating Fujiwara and the Four Seasons League, and they are deployed to Tokyo International Airport. However, they have a conflict over jurisdiction with the Self-Police, who normally have jurisdiction over the airport grounds and intend to deploy their Spezial Sturm Gruppe (inspired by the German Federal Police's GSG 9) to resolve the hijacking instead. The jurisdictional conflict comes to a head when unit commander Hajime Handa orders his Kerberos unit to ignore the Self-Police's blockade of the scene, which leads to a public armed standoff between the two police forces in the airport terminal. The resulting backlash leads to Kerberos being kicked from the airport, with the risk of arrest if they violate Self-Police jurisdiction again. Unwilling to allow the Spezial Sturm Gruppe to fight the terrorists instead of them, Handa procures a Volkswagen Type 26 service truck and sends Kerberos members Koichi Todome, Washio Midori, and Soichiro Toribe—three members closely associated with each other, and later nicknamed the "Devil's Trio"—to board Flight 666 disguised as caterers delivering food to the hostages.

- Act 4: The Fighting Dog - Chapter III (戦闘犬 - III 突入, Sentoken - III Totsunyū)

As Handa launches a diversion, Koichi, Midori, and Soichiro storm Flight 666 and kill most of the Four Seasons League terrorists, but before they can fully secure the plane, Fujiwara orders the pilot to take off. Koichi, Midori, and Soichiro promptly shoot the engines of the plane, forcing it to crash-land in a landfill on Showa Island. With Koichi and Soichiro dazed from the crash, Fujiwara attempts to escape, but Midori climbs the fuselage and begins setting up her Mauser C96 sidearm for long-range shooting. Handa and Kerberos rush to the crash site but are beaten there by the Self-Police, who surround Fujiwara and attempt to apprehend him; however, before they can do so, Fujiwara looks back at the plane and sees Midori, who shoots him between the eyes with her C96, killing him and securing the operation as a success for Kerberos.

=== Part II (第二部, Dai Nibu) ===
- Act 5: The Military Dog (軍用犬, Gunyōken)

Tetsurō Kai, the young leader of the Japan Ground Self-Defense Force's 1st Airborne Brigade Panzer Jäger Unit (ギア部隊), nicknamed "Molosser" and equipped with Protect Gear and anti-tank rifles, enters Kerberos's Academy Training School (首都警·養成学校) as an undercover trainee, where he falls in love with Midori and invites her to a JGSDF public equipment exhibition at Mount Fuji. Midori visits the event with fellow instructor Hachiro Tohbe and sees Kai demonstrating the Type 61 Protect Gears used by the JGSDF's Panzer Jägers.

- Act 6: The Stray Dog "Fast Food Grifter Clubbed to Death Case" (野良犬 ~マッハ軒立食師撲殺事件異聞~, Norainu)

A tachiguishi ("Fast Food Grifter" in English) named Cold Badger Masa is brutally beaten to death by Kerberos member Chuichi Koshiramaru in Mach, an illegal stand-and-eat (tachigui) soba restaurant. The Self-Police quickly arrest Koshiramaru and rumors of an anti-Kerberos conspiracy emerge. Soon, another rumor arises: the existence of "Jin-Roh", a secret counterintelligence unit within Kerberos that seeks to protect the unit from any threat to their existence. The Self-Police's investigation, led by Detective Takahiro Matsui (from Patlabor), details the intricacies of the existence and extent of the tachiguishi in the Japanese society of the Kerberos Saga.

This Act is an adaptation of "Third Night" from the 1987 radio drama While Waiting for the Red Spectacles. In 2006, it was loosely adapted as the film Tachiguishi-Retsuden.

- Act 7: The Mad Dog (狂犬, Kyōken)

Two German officials visit Japan on a diplomatic trip, but are met by hundreds of anti-Weimar Establishment protestors at a bridge junction near Tokyo International Airport. As the protest devolves into violence, the diplomatic convoy is attacked, and the Self-Police are overwhelmed, Kerberos members deployed on standby as backup open fire on the protestors, killing around 200 people. The event, known as the "Park Incident", becomes a political scandal and a firestorm that leads to public opinion turning sharply against the Metropolitan Police and Kerberos. In response to backlash, and deeming Kerberos no longer necessary in modern society, the National Public Safety Committee votes for the Metropolitan Police's dismantlement. However, Aniya and Tatsumi refuse to disband and instead plan a coup d'état, known in the Kerberos Saga as the "Kerberos Uprising" or "Kerberos Riot". Handa, the leader of Jin-Roh, gathers the Kerberos members and delivers a rousing speech enlisting them to the coup's cause.

- Act 8: The Fighting Dog II (戦闘犬 II, Sentoken II)

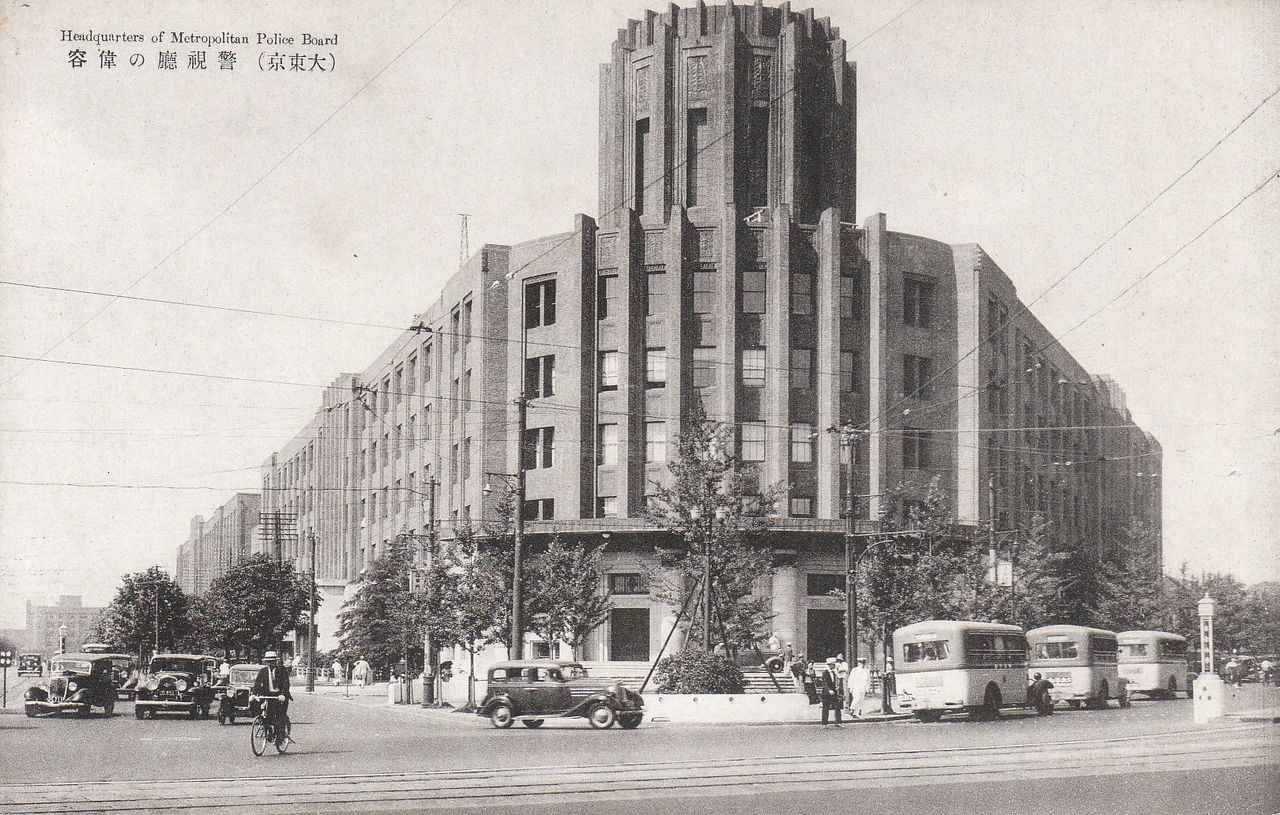
The Self-Police headquarters (real Tokyo Metropolitan Police Department headquarters pictured here in 1931) is the main setting of the climax of Act 8.

On February 26, 19XX, at around 7:12 a.m., the "Kerberos Uprising" is launched, when Tatsumi leads 1st Company "Kurzhaar" to Kasumigaseki, the location of a majority of the Japanese government's offices, supported by Handa's 2nd Company "Langhaar", Ichiro Kure's 3rd Company "Drahthaar", and the Aerial Squadron "Laelaps". Fighting breaks out when a Kerberos Fa-330 attacks a Self-Police Riot Police Unit dispatched to contain them, and Kerberos engages in direct combat with the Self-Police. 3rd Company eventually reaches the Self-Police headquarters and storms it, briefly capturing it before being defeated by Muroto's Public Security Division agents; meanwhile, Self-Police officers attack and kill the Aerial Squadron's ground crew, though all of their aircraft escape. After 3rd Company's demise, Handa orders 1st and 2nd Companies to storm the headquarters. Though Kerberos succeeds in seizing the Self-Police headquarters, additional Self-Police officers and Riot Police Units, including the JGSDF 1st Airborne Brigade commanded by Kai, arrive to besiege them; in the meantime, the Self-Police and JSDF besiege Kerberos's other facilities, such as the Kerberos Academy Training School, where Tohbe and the other instructors are also holding out. After several hours, at 12:00 noon, Shiro rallies the remaining Kerberos members for a last stand, and they exit the Self-Police headquarters to charge at the JGSDF, who fire back in response. As Kerberos fights their final battle, the last surviving Kerberos members—Todome, Midori, and Toribe, the "Devil's Trio"—flee in a stolen Volkswagen Kübelwagen toward the Port of Tokyo, where they plan to escape in a helicopter.

=== Special Issue ===
- The Night Before: Kerberos Riot Another Story (前夜-ケルベロス騒乱異聞, Zenya - keruberosu souran ibun)

The Special Issue details the aftermath of the "Park Incident" (Act 7) with Todome, Midori, Toribe, and Kerberos sniper Eito Kurosaki, a major character in Kerberos Saga Rainy Dogs.

== Issues ==
Various editions and reissues were released since 1988, and both the paper size and included bonus materials differ between them. The Magazine, Original, Zen, and Kerberos Saga editions use standard B5 (25.7 cm x 18.2 cm / 10.1" x 7.2"); the Popular edition uses A5 (21 cm x 14.8 cm); and the Frozen edition uses B6 size (18 cm x 13 cm). Additional contents such as prologues, production notes, scenarios, organization charts, glossary, staff interviews, and bibliographies are always included in tankōbon editions to explain the Kerberos Saga's complex background.

Amazing Comics serialization (Act1~2 / B5)

Kerberos Panzer Cop was first published in October 1988 through Amazing Comics (アメージング·コミックス), a science fiction/horror two-monthly comics magazine published from 1988 to 1989 by Kasakura Shuppansha.

Release	Magazine	Title	Contents
1988.10	アメージング·コミックス 第2号; Amazing Comics #2	犬狼伝説; Kerberos Panzer Cop	第1話: 捨て犬; Act 1: The Forsaken Dog
1989.02	アメージング·コミックス 第4号; Amazing Comics #4	犬狼伝説; Kerberos Panzer Cop	第2話 前編: 猟犬; Act 2: The Hound part 1
1989.04	アメージング·コミックス 第5号; Amazing Comics #5	犬狼伝説; Kerberos Panzer Cop	第2話 後編: 猟犬; Act 2: The Hound part 2

Combat Comic serialization (Act1~4 / B5)

After Amazing Comics last issue in April 1989, Kerberos Panzer Cop: Part I serialization restarted in Combat Comic (コンバットコミック), a monthly science fiction/fantasy comic magazine published from 1985 to 1990 by Nihon Shuppansha. Part One (Act1~4) was completed in July 1990.

Release	Magazine	Title	Contents
1989.11	コンバットコミック 第30号 (1989年11月号); Combat Comic #30	押井守&藤原カムイ: 犬狼伝説; Mamoru Oshii & Kamui Fujiwara: Kerberos Panzer Cop	Act 1/Act 2
1989.12	コンバットコミック 第31号 (1989年12月号); Combat Comic #31	押井守&藤原カムイ: 犬狼伝説; Mamoru Oshii & Kamui Fujiwara: Kerberos Panzer Cop	Act 3
1990.01	コンバットコミック 第32号 (1990年1月号); Combat Comic #32	押井守&藤原カムイ: 犬狼伝説; Mamoru Oshii & Kamui Fujiwara: Kerberos Panzer Cop	Act 4 part 1
1990.03	コンバットコミック 第34号 (1990年3月号); Combat Comic #34	押井守&藤原カムイ: 犬狼伝説; Mamoru Oshii & Kamui Fujiwara: Kerberos Panzer Cop	Act 4 part 2
1990.06	コンバットコミック 第37号 (1990年6月号); Combat Comic #37	押井守&藤原カムイ: 犬狼伝説; Mamoru Oshii & Kamui Fujiwara: Kerberos Panzer Cop	Act 4 part 3
1990.07	コンバットコミック 第38号 (1990年7月号); Combat Comic #38	押井守&藤原カムイ: 犬狼伝説; Mamoru Oshii & Kamui Fujiwara: Kerberos Panzer Cop	Act 4 part 4

Original edition (Part I / B5)

In December 1990, Nihon Shuppansha compiled Kerberos Panzer Cop: Part One in a single paperback volume with the original cheap paper quality and B5 size kept (25.7 cm x 18.2 cm). This original edition features a curved silver dust jacket cover that included a white obi strip promoting the StrayDog theatrical adaptation's March 1991 roadshow ("映画化公開決定!").

Release	Book	Title	Contents (•Extra)
1990.12.20	Nihon Shuppansha; ISBN 4-89048-271-7 (B5, 234p.)	犬狼伝説 (オリジナル版); Kerberos Panzer Cop (Original Edition)	Act1~4 with Prologue •犬狼伝説 設定解説 押井守篇; Kerberos Panzer Cop: Setting Explanation by Mamoru Oshii •出渕裕デザインワークス; Yutaka Izubuchi Design Works •不適な笑み 高取英; Unsuitable Smile by Ei Takatori •シナリオ 犬狼伝説 第3話:野犬 押井守; Scenario: Kerberos Panzer Cop Act3: The Stray Dog by Mamoru Oshii •ガキ大将=文学青年=押井守 友成純一; Gaki Daisho=Seinen Literature=Mamoru Oshii by Junichi Tomonari •犬と立喰い 押井守 (05.11.1990); Dogs & Fast Food by Mamoru Oshii (1990.11.05) •おとがき 藤原カムイ; Otogaki by Kamui Fujiwara •参考文献一覧; Enumerative bibliography

Popular edition (Part I / A5)

Re-issue of the 1990 Original edition by Nihon Shuppansha. Paper size is smaller than the original B5 edition (now 21 cm x 14.8 cm) but the paper quality is a bit better. Half of the bonus material was removed though for a budget release.

Release	Book	Title	Contents (•Extra)
1993.11.20	Nihon Shuppansha; ISBN 4-89048-402-7 (A5, 206p.)	犬狼伝説 (普及版); Kerberos Panzer Cop (Popular Edition)	Act1~4 with Prologue •シナリオ 犬狼伝説 第3話:野犬 押井守; Scenario: Kerberos Panzer Cop Act3: The Stray Dog by Mamoru Oshii •犬と立喰い 押井守 (05.11.1990); Dogs & Fast Food by Mamoru Oshii (1990.15.10) •おとがき 藤原カムイ; Otogaki by Kamui Fujiwara •参考文献一覧; Enumerative bibliography

Monthly Shōnen Ace serialization (Act5~8 / B5)

The sequel and completion of Kerberos Panzer Cop, featuring Acts 5~8 (第二部, Part 2), was published in Monthly Shōnen Ace (月刊少年エース, Gekkan Shōnen Esu) monthly comics magazine, property of Kadokawa Shoten. Kerberos Panzer Cop was completed in January 2000.

Release	Magazine	Title	Contents
1999.08	月刊少年エース 8月号; Monthly Shōnen Ace #8	犬狼伝説 第二部; Kerberos Panzer Cop - Part II	Act5
1999.09	月刊少年エース 9月号; Monthly Shōnen Ace #9	犬狼伝説 第二部; Kerberos Panzer Cop - Part II	Act6
1999.10	月刊少年エース 10月号; Monthly Shōnen Ace #10	犬狼伝説 第二部; Kerberos Panzer Cop - Part II	Act7
1999.11	月刊少年エース 11月号; Monthly Shōnen Ace #11	犬狼伝説 第二部; Kerberos Panzer Cop - Part II	Act8 part 1
1999.12	月刊少年エース 12月号; Monthly Shōnen Ace #12	犬狼伝説 第二部; Kerberos Panzer Cop - Part II	Act8 part 2
2000.01	月刊少年エース 1月号; Monthly Shōnen Ace #1	犬狼伝説 第二部; Kerberos Panzer Cop - Part II	Act8 part 3

Frozen edition (Part I & II / B6)

The "Frozen version" is a 2-volume renewal edition. The first volume is a reissue of the 1993 Popular edition, though it is a smaller format (18 cm x 13 cm) but the paper quality is even better (supercalendered). The second volume is the first ever compilation of Kerberos Panzer Cop Part II. It is dubbed "Conclusion" and was issued as a 10th anniversary of the Original edition, and also to coincide with the release of the theatrical adaptation, Jin-Roh, in Japan. Both volumes were issued within illustrator Kamui Fujiwara's works collection reissue.

Release	Book	Title	Contents (•Extra)
1999.06.25	Kadokawa Shoten; ISBN 4-04-713274-8 (B6, 200p.)	"そしていま、戦いの犬が野に放たれる." 犬狼伝説 (藤原カムイコレクション 1); Kerberos Panzer Cop (Kamui's Collection Issue #001)	Act1~4 with Prologue
2000.01.31	Kadokawa Shoten; ISBN 4-04-713324-8 (B6, 184p.)	"立ち塞がる者あらば、これを撃て" 犬狼伝説 完結篇 (藤原カムイコレクション 4); Kerberos Panzer Cop: Conclusion (Kamui's Collection Issue #004)	Act5~8 •Text 1:Organisation; File 1:Organization •Text 2:Hauptstadt Polizei; File 2:Capital Police •Text 3:Kerberos; File 3:Cerberus •Text 4:Formation; File 4:Organic •Text 5:Waffe; File 5:Weapon •Text 6:Anmerkung; File 6:Annotation

Zen edition (Part I & II / B5+CD)

The Zen ("Complete Book") edition is a boxset reissue of the Frozen version including Acts 1~8 in a +400 pages single volume bundled with goodies. As a collector item it was packaged in a white carton box bearing a "Zen" sticker and including a deluxe black carton boxset (with grey obi), three original B5 postcards, the drama CD version of While Waiting for the Red Spectacles ("Radio Kerberos"), the revised script for While Waiting for the Red Spectacles and various appendices. A limited Kerberos Panzer Cop Kubrick figure (Protect-Gear '92) was offered to first print pre-orderers on Kadokawa's website. The "Zen" edition was produced in small quantities sold 5,800¥ (+$51).

Release	Book	Title	Contents (•Extra)
2000.09.30	Kadokawa Shoten; ISBN 4-04-713343-4 (B5, 411p.)	犬狼伝説 [全] ZEN; Kerberos Panzer Cop: Complete Book	Act1~8 with Prologue •紅い眼鏡を待ちつつ ドラマCD •Kerberos Words

Kerberos Saga edition (Part I / B5)

Single act releases reissue in B5 format by Barque (Raiden company) through the Kerberos Saga official website. Kerberos Panzer Cops (with the plural form as in the live-action film StrayDog) is used instead of the original title Kerberos Panzer Cop.

Release	Book	Title	Contents (•Extra)
2007.04	Barque; KS200702 (B5, 56p.)	犬狼伝説 01; Kerberos Panzer Cops 01	捨犬; Act1: Suteinu
2007.06	Barque; KS200709 (B5, 56p.)	犬狼伝説 02; Kerberos Panzer Cops 02	猟犬 (ヤクトハウンド); Act 2: Ryōken (Jagdhund)
2008.02	Barque; KS200801 (B5, 56p.)	犬狼伝説 03; Kerberos Panzer Cops 03	戦闘犬 端緒/対峙; Act 3: Sentoken - Chapter 1: Tansho/Chapter 2:Taishi
2008.07	Barque; KS200804 (B5, 56p.)	犬狼伝説 04; Kerberos Panzer Cops 04	戦闘犬 突入; Act 3: Sentoken - Chapter 3: Totsunyū
