= Omnibus Promotion =

Film & anime sound effects production company

Omnibus Promotion (株式会社オムニバスプロモーション, Kabushiki Kaisha Omunibasu Puromōshon) is a film and anime sound effects production and distribution company established on 1963-08-01 and located in the San'ei-chō district of Shinjuku, Tokyo, Japan. They also operate under the name Requiem Studio (レクイエムスタジオ, Rekuiemu Sutajio).

== Main staff ==
- Kazumi Suzuki (Director of Public Relations)
- Satoshi Honzan
- Toshiki Kameyama
- Kunio Kuwabara
- Tadayuki Nukazuka
- Makoto Uchida

=== Former staff ===
- Naoko Asaka
- Kazuo Harada
- Shigeharu Shiba
- Kazuhiro Wakabayashi

== Works ==
- Castle in the Sky (film)
- Fushigiboshi no Futagohime (TV series)
- Future Boy Conan (TV series)
- Gakuen Utopia Manabi Straight! (TV series)
- Getsumento Heiki Mina (TV series)
- Hidamari Sketch (TV series)
- High School! Kimengumi (TV series, film)
- My Neighbor Totoro (film)
- Maison Ikkoku (TV, films)
- Nausicaä of the Valley of the Wind (film)
- Patlabor (TV, films)
- Princess Tutu (TV series)
- Ranma ½ (TV, films)
- Red Garden (TV series)
- Shōnen Onmyōji (TV series)
- StrayDog: Kerberos Panzer Cops (film)
- The Red Spectacles (film)
- Urusei Yatsura (TV, films)
- Violinist of Hameln (TV series)
- Welcome to the N.H.K. (TV series)
- Yoake Mae yori Ruri Iro na (TV series)
