= Tachiguishi-Retsuden =

立喰師列伝 Tachiguishi-Retsuden
- Theatrical release poster
- Directed by: Mamoru Oshii; Toshihiko Nishikubo (sequence director)
- Written by: Mamoru Oshii (based on the novel)
- Produced by: Toshihiko Nishikubo
- Starring: Kaito Kisshoji; Mako Hyōdō; Mitsuhisa Ishikawa; Toshio Suzuki; Shinji Higuchi; Kenji Kawai; Katsuya Terada; Shoji Kawamori
- Cinematography: Keiichi Sakazaki
- Edited by: Junichi Uematsu
- Music by: Kenji Kawai
- Production company: Production I.G
- Distributed by: Tohokushinsha Film
- Release date: April 8, 2006 (Japan)
- Running time: 104 minutes
- Country: Japan
- Language: Japanese

Tachiguishi-Retsuden (Japanese: 立喰師列伝; lit. Tachigui: The Amazing Lives of the Fast Food Grifters) is a 2006 Japanese animated comedy film directed by Japanese filmmaker Mamoru Oshii, who also wrote the eponymous novel on which the film was based. Both works are part of the Kerberos Saga. Live-action film and manga adaptations were produced few months later in Japan.

The Tachiguishi-Retsuden logo bears the mention Tachiguishi-Retsuden 1945–2006 A Mamoru Oshii Animation Film.

== Superlivemation ==
Tachiguishi-Retsuden is a documentary-style animation film created with an innovative technique named "Superlivemation". Oshii first experimented this flat 3D technique in his 2001 live-action feature Avalon as a visual effect for explosions in Ash's game, then he developed it, the following years, in both the MiniPato short films and PlayStation Portable game. Characters have a tiny body and an oversized head which makes them look funny.

They are animated like paper dolls (ペープサート人形, papsart ningyou) and are evolving in a pictures based environment in the likes of the JibJab Brothers' (Gregg and Evan Spiridellis) musical comedy cartoons, e.g. 2・0・5 Year In Review, although Mamoru Oshii stated his own work was a "serious comedy".

The Superlivemation consists of digitally processing then animating, paper puppet theater-style characters and locations based on real photographs. In Tachiguishi-Retsuden more than 30,000 photographs were processed 20 times, to produce the final composite to be animated.

The director describes his new animation film as set between "a simple animation with extremely intense information" and "a live-action movie with extremely limited information".

The theatrical release poster, which was later used on the OST and the videos, features several symbols of the Japanese popular culture and modern history. Clockwise, a Boeing B-29 Superfortress passing over, in reference to the American bombing of Hiroshima and Nagasaki cities in 1945, the Tokyo Tower which was completed in 1958, the high-speed train Shinkansen 0 Series, launched in 1964, at last, the standing character eating a gyudong bowl is Foxy Croquette O-Gin, in reference to the popular tachigui practice.

== Kerberos saga ==
=== Urusei Yatsura: Hisatsu! Tachigui Wars!! (1984) ===
Foxy Croquette O-Gin (ケツネコロッケのお銀) and the Fast Food Grifters first appeared in Mamoru Oshii's Urusei Yatsura anime television series episode #99 (必殺！立ち食いウォーズ！！) which is based on an original story by Rumiko Takahashi. The characters were known as "pro of tachigui" (立喰いのプロ) instead of "tachiguishi". The English dub version titles Certain Death! Stand-Up Eating Contest (episode #99).

=== While Waiting for the Red Spectacles (1987) ===
The Fast Food Grifters first met the Kerberos in the 1987 radio drama While Waiting for the Red Spectacles's (紅い眼鏡を待ちつつ) Cold Badger Masa assassination episode.

=== The Red Spectacles (1987) ===
Moongaze Ginji and Foxy Croquette O-Gin are featured in the 1987 live-action film The Red Spectacles (紅い眼鏡, Akai Megane).

=== Kerberos Panzer Cop: Conclusion (1999) ===
Cold Badger Masa and Moongaze Ginji are featured in the 1999 manga series Kerberos Panzer Cop's (犬狼伝説 完結篇) Act 6.

=== Onna Tachiguishi-Retsuden (2006) ===
Mamoru Oshi directed a spin-off episode Female Fast Food Grifter: Foxy Croquette O-Gin ~Struggle to Death in Palestine~. This short video was available as a bonus DVD bundled with Monthly Comic Ryu Vol.1 magazine which was published on September 19, 2006. A retail edition with extra material and a regular DVD package was reissued in late December of the same year.

=== Kerberos & Tachiguishi (2006) ===
The manga named Kerberos & Tachiguishi: Young Lady's Abdomen Biological Clock (tentative title for ケルベロスX立喰師 腹腹時計の少女, Keruberosu ekusu tachiguishi hara haradokei no shōjo) was published in Monthly Comic Ryu from October 2006 to May 2007 and was collected in one volume. It involves Foxy Croquette O-Gin within the Kerberos universe.

== Story ==
=== Prologue ===
Starting from a Proustian approach of food, Oshii tries to recreate 60-years of Japanese dietary history in his "Documentary of Shōwa underground". This work is actually a false documentary style animation movie, which borrows and develops some key elements from his 1987 debut live-action feature, The Red Spectacles, e.g. the stand-and-eat (tachigui), the post-World War II retro background, the avant-garde visuals and screenplay, and even the tachiguishi theme with returning characters like Moongaze Ginji.

In Akai Megane (The Red Spectacles), the new totalitarianist government has forbidden the tachigui in Tokyo in 1998. Stand-and-eat bars, among popular services like convenience stores, were seen as a threat to public order by the liberty killer political authority, therefore they were banned or restricted. However, some illegal tachigui bars still exists in the underground of the capital. One of the reason these bars have been definitely prohibited is, they were open at night and both owners and customers were suspected to take part to subversive talks and meetings.

=== Plot ===
A fictional documentary about changing Japanese eating habits and the colorful thieves that swindle the restaurants which serve them. The film begins with the origins of Japanese food stalls following the country's defeat in World War II. The first grifter introduced is Moongaze Ginji. He requests soba noodle soup with a raw egg (also known as "Moongaze Soba"). He declares the dish to be an imitation of a landscape.

The main body of the film follows a predictable pattern. A grifter is introduced, his food preference demonstrating the continued decline of traditional food in Japan, and his grift comically illustrated. Intercut at random are popular news event stories that always emphasise Japan losing its way and America and its allies' cultural and military despotism.

Vignettes include Japanese children exploding from hula hoop use, drunk businessmen imitating Neil Armstrong, as anomalies of natural disasters coinciding with the ongoing cultural transformation underline nature itself disproving changes in Japan. Yukio Mishima's suicide is also referred to as an effect. Mishima committed suicide by seppuku to illustrate his support for Imperial Japan and the Emperor as a god.

One of the last grifters is Frankfuter Tatsu whose monologue is censored in each sentence because it refers to Disneyland. "I could only think of "beeeep-Land" he declares over and over. He is obsessed with American culture while simultaneously being censored by America's despotic laws. When asked why he is so interested in Disneyland he says he knows it is empty and fake, but full of everything, and nothing.

=== Characters ===
Main characters:

- Moongaze Ginji
- Foxy Croquette O-Gin
- Crying Inumaru
- Cold Badger Masa
- Beefbowl Ushigoro
- Hamburger Tetsu
- Medium Hot Sabu
- Frankfurter Tatsu
- Crepe Mami
- Baked Bean Pastry Amataro

Secondary characters:

- Tokumitsu Shinada
- Manager Kamiyama

== Releases ==
=== Book ===
- 2004.02.XX: Tachiguishi-Retsuden (立喰師列伝) novel by Mamoru Oshii

Kadokawa Shoten, 287p., 19cm, ISBN 4-04-873516-0

- 2006.04.XX: Tachiguishi, Kaku Katariki. (立喰師、かく語りき。, Thus Spoke Tachiguishi) interview book by Mamoru Oshii

Tokuma Shoten, 254p., 19cm, ISBN 4-19-862160-8

=== Audio ===
- 2006.04.05: Tachiguishi-Retsuden O.S.T. (立喰師列伝) original soundtrack by Kenji Kawai (featuring e-mi)

Victor Entertainment, 24 tracks, VICL-61927

=== Video ===
- 2006.09.22: Tachiguishi Retsuden (立喰師列伝) DVD

Bandai Visual, 90min. Film, DVD9, DD5.1ch + DD2.0ch

- 2006.09.22: Tachiguishi Retsuden Collectors Set (立喰師列伝 コレクターズセット) L.E. 2DVD

Bandai Visual, 90min. Film, 2DVD9, DD5.1ch + DD2.0ch, Special Disc: 90min. Making Of, 192p. Script Replica, 62p. Collector Booklet

- 2024.01.30: Tachigui: The Amazing Lives of the Fast Food Grifters Blu-Ray

Discotek Media, 104min.

== Production ==
=== Guest stars ===
Shoji Kawamori: Famous for Macross Plus, etc.
Kenji Kawai: Famous composer of Mamoru Oshii feature films (StrayDog, Patlabor the movie 2, GITS, Avalon) and WARP/Sega video games (Enemy Zero, Deep Fear), etc.
Kenji Kamiyama: Famous director of Ghost in the Shell: Stand Alone Complex TV series, etc.
Toshio Suzuki: etc.
Shinji Higuchi: etc.
Katsuya Terada: etc.

=== Cast ===
Kaito Kisshoji (吉祥寺怪人): Moongaze Ginji (月見の銀二, Tsukimi no Ginji)
Mako Hyodo (兵頭まこ): Foxy Croquette O-Gin (ケツネコロッケのお銀, Ketsune Krocket no Ogin)
Mitsuhisa Ishikawa (石川光久): Crying Inumaru (哭きの犬丸, Naki no Inumaru)
Toshio Suzuki (鈴木敏夫): Cold Badger Masa (冷しタヌキの政, Hiyashi Tanuki no Masa)
Shinji Higuchi (樋口真嗣): Beefbowl Ushigoro (牛丼の牛五郎, Gyudon no Ushi-Goro)
Kenji Kawai (川井憲次): Hamburger Tetsu (ハンバーガーの哲, Hamburger no Tetsu)
Katsuya Terada (寺田克也): Frankfurter Tatsu (フランクフルトの辰, Frankfurt no Tatsu)
Shoji Kawamori (河森正治): Medium Hot Sabu (中辛のサブ, Chu-Kara no Sabu)
Fuyuki Shinada (品田冬樹): Tokumitsu Shinada
Kenji Kamiyama (神山健治): Manager Kamiyama

=== Voice cast ===
Koichi Yamadera (山寺宏一): Narrator, Inumaru, Tatsu, etc.
Mako Hyodo (兵頭まこ): O-Gin
Yoshiko Sakakibara (榊原良子): Medical examiner, Tatsu's mother, etc.
Fumihiko Tachiki (立木文彦): Ushigoro, Tetsu, Tokumitsu, Narrator of the preview, etc.

=== Staff ===
- Original story, script and direction: Mamoru Oshii
- Shooting: Keiichi Sakazaki
- 3DCG: IKIF
- Visual Effects: Hisashi Ezura
- Sound: Kazuhiro Wakabayashi
- Music: Kenji Kawai
- Production: Toshihiko Nishikubo
- Animation: Production I.G
