= Onna Tachiguishi-Retsuden =

- Japanese DVD cover (TLPD-0029)
- Directed by: Mamoru Oshii
- Written by: Mamoru Oshii
- Produced by: Hiroaki Yuasa
- Starring: Mako Hyodo; Gichi Otsuka; Ali Daei
- Cinematography: Hiroaki Yuasa
- Edited by: Hiroaki Yuasa
- Music by: Kenji Kawai
- Distributed by: Tlip; Deiz
- Release date: September 19, 2006 (Japan)
- Running time: 23 minutes
- Language: Japanese

Onna Tachiguishi-Retsuden (女立喰師列伝) taglined Ketsune korokke no Ogin: Paresuchina shitō hen (ケツネコロッケのお銀 ~パレスチナ死闘篇~), is a Japanese short film written and directed by Mamoru Oshii.

== Title ==
The original title translates in English as Female Fast Food Grifter: Foxy Croquette O-Gin ~Struggle to Death in Palestine~.

== Short ==
This live action film is a spinoff episode of the anime feature film Tachigui: The Amazing Lives of the Fast Food Grifters released in April 2006. It focuses on a female Fast Food Grifter known as Foxy Croquette.

The premium edition was available as a DVD (24 minutes) bundled with the first issue of Monthly Comic Ryu ("月刊 Comic リュウ"). The disc was inserted in a paperboard package.

The magazine's first issue coincides with the release of the video edition of Tachiguishi-Retsuden in Japan.

On December 22, 2006, the short film was re-released in a regular DVD case and made available in stores. This retail edition features 39 minutes of extra material (Making Of featurette and a Mamoru Oshii interview) and a different disc serigraphy using the new cover artwork.

The first print contains a pair of collector wooden chopsticks, as a reference to the one used by the female Fast Food Grifter in the movie. Customers ordering from the distributor's official online shop can get an extra pair of chopsticks. This limited edition uses the original movie's own colors blue/yellow, while the regular package is designed after the short, i.e. black/red.

== Kerberos saga ==
=== Overview ===
This short film is a spinoff of the Tachiguishi-Retsuden anime. The tachiguishi characters first appeared in a 1984 episode of the anime television series Urusei Yatsura titled Hisatsu! Tachigui Wars!! (#122). Mako Hyodo first played as Foxy Croquette O-Gin / Young Lady (shōjo) in the 1987 live-action film The Red Spectacles.

=== Tachiguishi ===
As tachigui professionals, the legendary Fast Food Grifters have the privilege to eat in stand-and-eat street restaurants without paying.

=== Prequel (2004) ===
Tachiguishi-Retsuden is a novel written by Mamoru Oshii. In 2006, the Japanese director adapted his novel on screen in a self-titled anime mockumentary.

== Story ==
=== Plot ===
This short spinoff relates the adventures of Foxy Croquette O-Gin after she mysteriously disappeared from Nagatachō, Tokyo, as seen in Tachiguishi-Retsuden. She actually left Japan after the incident that occurred during 1960 Anpo Protests against the US-Japan Security Treaty (Anpo), to move to the Middle East and fight there as a guerrilla.

Palestine guerrilla turned Foxy Croquette O-Gin, aka AK Ginko, could be the mysterious Young Lady of Fate (少女, shōjo) featured in The Red Spectacles as both characters are performed by Japanese model and actor, Mako Hyodo which is dressed like Little Red Riding Hood in both films.

=== Characters ===
- Foxy Croquette O-Gin
- Gichio Otsuka
- Futoshi Murayama

== Production ==
=== Cast ===
- Mako Hyodo - Foxy Croquette O-Gin / AK Ginko (ケツネコロッケのお銀 / AKの銀子) - Mako Hyodo is arguably Oshii's favourite collaborator actress. She plays in half his live-action films including Talking Head and she did dubbing in some of his anime as well (MiniPato).
- Gichi Otsuka - Gichio Otsuka (大塚ギチ男)
- Ali Daei - Futoshi Murayama (村山太)

=== Staff ===
- Original work, script, direction: Mamoru Oshii
- Production, photography, edit: Hiroaki Yuasa
- Music: Kenji Kawai
- Sound production: Kazuhiro Wakabayashi
- Gun effect supervisor: Kikuo Osatomi
