= While Waiting for the Red Spectacles =

1987 radio drama

Studio album by Kenji Kawai
- Released: September 28, 2000 (Japan)
- Recorded: January 1987
- Genre: Science fiction, drama
- Length: 37:32
- Label: Kadokawa Shoten
- Producer: Kadokawa Shoten

While Waiting for the Red Spectacles (紅い眼鏡を待ちつつ, Akai Megane O Machi Tsutsu) is a 1987 science fiction radio drama written and directed by Mamoru Oshii, with music composed and performed by Kenji Kawai. The first work in the Kerberos Saga, it is a prequel and companion piece to the 1987 film The Red Spectacles, and follows police detective Koichi Todome while he is exiled from an alternate history Japan following his involvement in the "Kerberos Riot", a major event in the saga's history.

First recorded in January 1987, it was released in 2000 as a limited CD drama bundled with Kerberos Panzer Cop: Complete Book [Zen] edition.

== Story ==
The narration follows Koichi Todome while he is exiled from Japan after the Kerberos Riot, an internal conflict between rivalling police factions, before Inui came to Taiwan seeking him. The portrayed events can be localized in the saga's timeline between the prologue of The Red Spectacles and StrayDog.

In 1999, 3rd night: Story of the incident of Fast Food Grifter Cold Badger Masa's clubbing to death was adapted in comic to become Kerberos Panzer Cop Act 6. In 2004, the novel Tachiguishi-Retsuden was released, extending the Tachigui arc introduced in While Waiting for the Red Spectacles.

=== Track listing ===
- 1st night: Kerberos Night - The Rise and Fall of the Panzer Detective

(第一夜 ケルベロスの夜－機甲刑事の栄光と没落)

- 2nd night: Kerberos Night - Dog's name: "Koichi Todome"

(第二夜 ケルベロスの夜－犬の名は都々目紅一)

- 3rd night: Tachiguishi Night - Story of the incident of Fast Food Grifter Cold Badger Masa's clubbing to death

(第三夜 立食師たちの夜－マッハ軒立食師撲殺事件・異聞)

- 4th night: Tachiguishi Night - The Fast Food Grifter becoming a myth ?

(第四夜 立食師たちの夜－師よ神話の人となるか)

- 5th night: Tachiguishi Night - Does the dog throw into the darkness of the battle and just leave ?

(第五夜 立食師たちの夜－犬は戦いの闇に舞い降りるか)

== Releases ==
The drama was broadcast on Radio Nihon in January 1987, one month before the release of The Red Spectacles. In September 2000, it was released as a CD drama bundled with the Kerberos Panzer Cop: Complete Book manga.

The two musical themes were released, in 2003, in Kenji Kawai's "Cinema Anthology" audio CD boxset.

== Production ==
=== Cast ===
- 局員A: Akio Ōtsuka (大塚明夫)
- 局員B: Takashi Matsuyama (松山鷹志)
- 局員C: Rei Sakuma (佐久間レイ)
- 局員D: Mako Hyodo (兵藤まこ)
- Airport announcer: Rei Sakuma (佐久間レイ)
- Police radio A: Takashi Matsuyama (松山鷹志)
- Police radio B: Haji Takaya (土師孝也)
- Police radio C: Akio Ohtsuka (大塚明夫)
- Narrator: Haji Takaya (土師孝也)

=== Staff ===
- 原案・脚本: Mamoru Oshii, (伊藤和典)
- 録音演出: (若林和弘)
- 調整: (門倉徹), (高野慎二)
- 音楽: (川井憲次)
- 監督: (押井守)
- Recording studio: Tokyo TV Center
- Original edition: Pair Pair Animage / Radio Japan
- Broadcast: January 26~30 1987
