= Assault Girls =

- Directed by: Mamoru Oshii
- Written by: Mamoru Oshii
- Produced by: Issei Shibata
- Starring: Meisa Kuroki; Rinko Kikuchi; Hinako Saeki; Yoshikatsu Fujiki
- Cinematography: Hiroaki Yuasa; Atsuki Sato
- Edited by: Atsuki Sato
- Music by: Kenji Kawai
- Production company: Geneon Universal Entertainment
- Release date: December 19, 2009
- Running time: 65 minutes
- Country: Japan
- Languages: English; Japanese
- Budget: $1.1 million

Assault Girls (アサルトガールズ) is a 2009 Japanese science fiction film written and directed by Mamoru Oshii. It was released in Japan on December 19, 2009. The movie was developed as a spiritual sequel to the Assault Girl: Hinako The Kentucky and Assault Girl 2 shorts Oshii directed as part of the Shin-Onna Tachiguishi Retsuden and Rebellion: The Killing Isle collections of short films respectively. It is also set in the same fictional universe as Oshii's Avalon 2001 film but it is not a direct sequel.

== Synopsis ==
In the aftermath of global thermonuclear war, three battle tested women wage war against giant mutant sandwhales in the arena Avalon(f) of a virtual reality video game called Avalon. All of them seek to kill "Madara Sunakujira" the arena's end boss but find that despite their high levels, are unable to engage it alone as they wish, forcing them to form a party to defeat it together. "Gray," a sniper who travels flying in her own plane, "Lucifer," a black-dress-wearing girl who can turn into a giant crow and uses magic spells, "Colonel," a woman in burgundy armor who uses an FN FAL with M203, and "Jäger," a drifter who uses a powerful sniper rifle and relies on his luck (despite the Game Master telling him his luck stat is very low). The four defeat Madara, but unfortunately for Jäger, only the first person to turn in the quest gets the points, all the girls having flying transports while he's left on foot. In anger Jäger shoots them all down and declares himself a "player killer", and all of them engage in a fire fight.

== Cast ==
- Meisa Kuroki - Gray
- Rinko Kikuchi - Lucifer
- Hinako Saeki - Colonel
- Yoshikatsu Fujiki - Jäger
- Ian Moore - Game Master/Narration
- Isao Keneko - NEET
- Takanori Tsujimoto - NEET
