= Jin-Roh: The Wolf Brigade =

1999 Japanese animated film by Hiroyuki Okiura

- Theatrical release poster
- Directed by: Hiroyuki Okiura
- Written by: Mamoru Oshii
- Based on: Characters by Mamoru Oshii
- Produced by: Tsutomu Sugita; Hidekazu Terakawa
- Starring: Yoshikatsu Fujiki; Sumi Mutoh; Hiroyuki Kinoshita; Kousei Hirota; Yoshisada Sakaguchi
- Cinematography: Hisao Shirai
- Edited by: Shūichi Kakesu
- Music by: Hajime Mizoguchi
- Production company: Production I.G/ING
- Distributed by: Bandai Visual
- Release dates: November 17, 1999 (France); June 3, 2000 (Japan)
- Running time: 102 minutes
- Country: Japan
- Language: Japanese

Jin-Roh (Japanese: 人狼, Hepburn: Jinrō; lit. 'Wolfman'), also known as Jin-Roh: The Wolf Brigade in its American release, is a 1999 Japanese anime action political thriller film directed by Hiroyuki Okiura and written by Mamoru Oshii. Based on the first chapter of volume 1 of Oshii's manga Kerberos Panzer Cop, it is the third film (first chronologically) in the Kerberos Saga after 1987's The Red Spectacles and 1991's StrayDog: Kerberos Panzer Cops, and is the only fully animated film in the saga. The film stars Yoshikatsu Fujiki, Sumi Mutoh, Hiroyuki Kinoshita, Kousei Hirota, and Yoshisada Sakaguchi.

Jin-Roh is set in an authoritarian postwar Japan in the saga's alternate history where Nazi Germany won World War II, occupied Japan (a member of the Allies in this timeline), and eventually denazified back into the Weimar Republic. Germany's attempts to globalize and modernize Japan spark civil unrest and the rise of the Sect, an anti-government left-wing terrorist group. With regular Self-Police unable to handle spiking terrorist activity, the Japanese government forms the Capital Police and their Special Armed Garrison "Kerberos", a heavily armed counterterrorist unit equipped with powered exoskeletons called Protect Gears. Jin-Roh follows Kerberos member Kazuki Fuse who, after witnessing a young terrorist he was ordered to execute kill herself in a suicide bombing, meets Kei Amemiya, who claims to be the girl's sister; their relationship develops in the midst of a violent interservice rivalry between Kerberos and the Public Security Division, the Capital Police's intelligence unit.

The film premiered on November 17, 1999, in France, and June 3, 2000, in Japan. Bandai Entertainment and Viz Media licensed the film for an English-language release in North America and Europe in 2000. It has been relicensed in North America by Discotek Media, with a DVD released on April 29, 2014, followed by a Blu-ray on January 27, 2015. A live action Korean remake, Illang: The Wolf Brigade, was released in 2018, featuring a different setting and renamed characters but largely the same premise and plot.

== Plot ==
In an alternate 1950s Tokyo, the Self-Police respond to a riot in Akasaka that escalates into violence. In the storm sewers below, members of the Sect deliver Molotov cocktails and satchel charges to the rioters, aided by Nanami Agawa, a young Sect "Little Red Riding Hood" courier. When several riot police officers are incapacitated by a Sect-provided satchel charge, the Self-Police move in on the rioters, while the Capital Police deploys Kerberos, who easily wipe out the cell and destroy their explosives. Kerberos member Kazuki Fuse confronts Nanami as she flees, but freezes up when ordered to execute her instead of apprehend her. Rather than surrender, Nanami detonates her satchel charge, killing herself and causing a power outage that leads to the Self-Police losing control of the situation above. The incident damages Kerberos's reputation and deeply affects Fuse, who is reprimanded for his inaction and ordered to redo training under drill instructor Hachiroh Tohbe.

A remorseful Fuse, acting on information from his friend, Public Security head Atsushi Henmi, visits Nanami's grave and meets Kei Amemiya, a girl who claims to be Nanami's older sister and does not hold him responsible for her demise; they quickly develop a bond. However, Kei is revealed to not be Nanami's sister, but a former Little Red Riding Hood courier coerced into acting on behalf of Public Security, who seek to dissolve Kerberos and merge with the Self-Police to shift their counterterrorism strategies from brute force to intelligence. Public Security attempts to use Kei to entrap Fuse at a museum with the goal of discrediting Kerberos, but he sneaks in, incapacitates the Public Security agents, and escapes with Kei, evading the Self-Police. Kei reveals her role in the deception and suggests they run away together, but Fuse insists on staying, and they fall in love.

Fuse and Kei seek refuge in the same sewers from the riot shootout and are met by members of "Jin-Roh" ("Wolf Brigade" in English), a secret deep-cover counterintelligence group led by Tohbe and Hajime Handa that protects Kerberos from organizational threats like Public Security. They provide Fuse with an MG 42 and a full set of Protect Gear, and reveal they knew of Kei's role and consider her living proof of Public Security's conspiracy, before leaving with Kei. Public Security teams led by Henmi arrive, having followed a tracking device hidden in Kei's bag, but are met by a fully armored Fuse, who slaughters the agents in a shootout and finishes off a mortally wounded Henmi in a duel.

Fuse reunites with Kei and Jin-Roh in a junkyard, but is distraught when he is ordered to kill Kei to ensure she is never recaptured by Public Security. Kei embraces Fuse and tearfully repeats the words of Little Red Riding Hood, describing the grotesque appearance of a wolf disguised as a loved one. Horrified at what he has to do, Fuse has a crisis, before he shoots and kills Kei. Somewhere nearby, Tohbe solemnly compares Kei's fate to the demise of Red Riding Hood and the triumph of the wolf.

== Cast ==
Character	Japanese	English
Kazuki Fuse (伏 一貴, Fuse Kazuki)	Yoshikatsu Fujiki	Michael Dobson
Kei Amemiya (雨宮 圭, Amemiya Kei)	Sumi Mutoh	Moneca Stori
Atsushi Henmi (辺見 敦, Henmi Atsushi)	Hiroyuki Kinoshita	Colin Murdock
Nanami Agawa (阿川 七生, Agawa Nanami)	Eri Sendai	Maggie Blue O'Hara
Isao Aniya (安仁屋 勲, Aniya Isao)	Kenji Nakagawa	French Tickner
Bunmei Muroto (室戸 文明, Muroto Bunmei)	Kousei Hirota	Dale Wilson
Shiroh Tatsumi (巽 志郎, Tatsumi Shirō)	Ryuichi Horibe	Ron Halder
Hajime Handa (半田 元, Handa Hajime)	Yukihiro Yoshida	Michael Kopsa
Hachiroh Tohbe (塔部 八郎, Tōbe Hachirō)	Yoshisada Sakaguchi	Doug Abrahams
Capo Officer (自治警幹部, Jichikei kanbu)	Tamio Ōki	N/A

== Production ==
Mamoru Oshii had wanted to create what ultimately became Jin-Roh several years prior. It was planned to be the third and final live-action feature film of the Kerberos trilogy, but its production wasn't possible until 1994, while Oshii was already working on Ghost in the Shell. As he was unable to produce two films in the same time, but also did not want someone else to direct his final episode, Oshii decided that the third episode would be an anime instead, as opposed to the live action productions used for The Red Spectacles and StrayDog.

The project was originally pitched as a six-episode original video animation, as Oshii knew Bandai Visual was interested in having him do a series for them and his original Kerberos Panzer Cop manga was formed by six chapters. As he proposed the project to Bandai Visual at a meeting, they asked him to direct Ghost in the Shell, but nonetheless greenlit the series for pre-production. The production eventually evolved into a feature film following the international success of Ghost in the Shell, as Manga Entertainment wanted a similar hit and saw potential in Kerberos Panzer Cop after the manga had been published in the West as Hellhounds.

After reluctantly giving up the directorial role, Oshii considered who to hand the project to. He originally sought Patlabor 2: The Movie animation director Kazuchika Kise, but he had no interest in chief direction at the time. He then committed Jin-Roh as a debut film to a trusted young collaborator, Hiroyuki Okiura, who had worked with Oshii on animated films such as Ghost in the Shell and Patlabor 2. Oshii considered him the most able candidate among the younger staff of the studio, and both Production IG and Bandai Visual, knowing about his directing ambitions and his interest in creating a serious drama, wanted him to do his debut for them.

Oshii wanted to at least be entrusted with the screenplay, as the prospect of working with Okiura changed his previous reluctance for merely writing films. This was not originally in Bandai's plans for the film, but Oshii expected Kazunori Itō, his usual screenwriter, to reject their offer as he had previously told him that he did not want to write a story involving dogs following his work for The Red Spectacles; after he did so, he was offered the role. He ultimately still found the experience frustrating both during the writing process ("The moment you write, you want to direct") and after realizing the result would unavoidably be much different from what he pictured in his head. Lacking any creative control on the process, he chose to distance himself from the animation production while looking forward to the final product.

Okiura favored traditional animation, and thus the film was almost completely drawn by hand, requiring 80,000 cels. Oshii, who characterized him as "allergic to computers", admitted that had he directed the film he would have relied on computer animation just as he did in Ghost in the Shell and no more than 30,000 cels would have been needed. Still, the celwork was subsequently processed through the Animo software to enhance some visual effects, textures, and camerawork.

The film's musical score was composed by Hajime Mizoguchi.

The series setting has also led to it being labelled dieselpunk.

== Release ==
Jin-Roh was first seen in the early 1999 film festival circuit, including the 49th Berlin International Film Festival and the 19th Fantasporto in February. It was subsequently shown in Cannes' Marché du Film, which presumably netted its early French theatrical release on November 17. The Japanese preview of the film took place on June 19 in the Roppongi 20th Century Films theater.

== Media ==
=== Printed media ===
- June 2000: Jin-Roh Behind Of The Screen (official making book)

Japanese text, Mamoru Oshii, Production I.G, ISBN 4-04-853219-7

- September 2000: Jin-Roh Maniaxx (magazine book)

Japanese text, Mamoru Oshii, Kadokawa Shoten, ISBN 4-87892-192-7

- December 2000: Jin-Roh Screenboard Book (official storyboard)

Japanese text, 522p., Hiroyuki Okiura, Production I.G
L.E. DVD set only

=== Soundtrack ===
- June 2000: Jin-Roh Original Motion Picture Soundtrack (CD)

Hajime Mizoguchi feat. Gabriela Robin, Czech Philharmonic, Victor Entertainment VICL-60569

- (Canada) (United States) March 2002: Jin-Roh: The Wolf Brigade Sound Track (CD)

Bandai Entertainment
L.E. DVD set only

== Reception ==
An early comment on the film was given by Blue Sky animator André Mazzone, who was shown the film in May 1999 as part of a delegation from the studio to Production IG's headquarters. He praised it for the beauty of its animation and character designs and the "subtle and crafty twists" in the story, and commented that the differing approaches to production meant directors were freed from needing to appeal to a wide target audience and allowed to have much greater creative control than in Hollywood animated features, favoring the sophisticated productions anime was known for.

The following month the film was shown in Cannes' Marché du Film, where Variety's Derek Elley noted it for pushing cel animation to its limits in the action scenes and for Okiura's focus on stillness in between while considering it a less complex work than its predecessor Ghost in the Shell lacking its "stomach-churning, visionary moments".

Hyper commends the film for its "art direction and character design which are beautiful examples of hand-drawn animation and the music fits the action (or lack thereof) brilliantly. However, the film's "slow, deliberate pace" was criticized. Helen McCarthy in 500 Essential Anime Movies called the anime "a must-see" and praised the score and the design, commenting on "some breathtakingly composed scenes".

=== Awards ===
Festival	Year	Result	Award	Category
Fant-Asia Film Festival	1999	2nd	Best Asian Film	Best Asian Film
Fantasporto	1999	Won	Fantasia Section Award	Best Film – Animation
Fantasporto	1999	Won	International Fantasy Film Special Jury Award	Special Jury Award
Fantasporto	1999	Nominated	International Fantasy Film Award	Best Film
Yubari International Fantastic Film Festival	2000	Won	Minami Toshiko Award	International Competition
Mainichi Film Concours	2000	Won	Mainichi Film Concours	Best Animated Film
Japanese Professional Movie Awards	2001	Won	Special Award	Special Award

== Remake ==
A South Korean live action remake, titled Illang: The Wolf Brigade, directed by Kim Jee-woon, updated the setting from an alternate history 1950s Japan to a dystopian mid-2020s South Korea, where the plot revolves around plans to unite the two Koreas. The film stars Gang Dong-won, Han Hyo-joo, and Jung Woo-sung, and was released on July 15, 2018.
