= Talking Head (film) =

- Directed by: Mamoru Oshii
- Written by: Mamoru Oshii
- Produced by: Hiroki Miyagawa; Shin Unozawa
- Starring: Shigeru Chiba; Fumihiko Tachiki; Keishi Hunt; Mako Hyoudou; Tomoko Ishimura
- Cinematography: Yousuke Mamiya
- Edited by: Hiroshi Matsuo
- Music by: Kenji Kawai
- Production company: Bandai Visual
- Distributed by: Bandai Co., Ltd.
- Release date: 1992
- Country: Japan
- Language: Japanese

Talking Head (トーキング・ヘッド, Tōkingu Heddo) is a 1992 Japanese live-action film written and directed by Mamoru Oshii. It is a surreal meta-film mystery involving the production of an anime called Talking Head.

The film has many references to the anime industry with characters being named after animators such as Yasuo Ōtsuka and Ichirō Itano, designer Yutaka Izubuchi, writer Kazunori Itō, and composer Kenji Kawai. The director of the film within the film is named Rei Maruwa, which was a pseudonym for Oshii on several of his projects.

The film features a short anime segment by famous character designer Haruhiko Mikimoto (of Macross fame).
