= Shin-Onna Tachiguishi Retsuden =

- Theatrical poster
- Directed by: Mamoru Oshii; Makoto Kamiya; Kenji Kamiyama; Takanori Tsujimoto; Hiroaki Yuasa
- Written by: Mamoru Oshii
- Starring: Mako Hyōdō; Mabuki Andō; Hinako Saeki; Yōko Fujita
- Music by: Kenji Kawai
- Distributed by: DEIZ; Geneon Entertainment
- Release date: November 20, 2007 (Japan)
- Country: Japan
- Language: Japanese

Eat and Run: 6 Beautiful Grifters (Japanese: 真女立喰師列伝, Hepburn: Shin-Onna Tachiguishi Retsuden) is a Japanese 2007 anthology film. A sequel to Onna Tachiguishi-Retsuden, it consists of six loosely connected short stories. It was released in Japanese theaters on November 10, 2007 and on DVD on April 23, 2008.

== Production ==
While the original Tachiguishi was directed by Mamoru Oshii, only two of the short stories are directed by him in Shin-Onna. The remaining four were directed by Makoto Kamiya, Kenji Kamiyama, Takanori Tsujimoto, and Hiroaki Yuasa. More changes from the original include a change from Oshii's creation of Super-livemation to a mix between live action and CG. Also, instead of focusing on male characters, Shin-Onna features mainly the female counterparts, hence the title, which roughly translates as The True-Female Amazing Lives of Fast Food Grifters (the English release went under the name The Women of Fast Food). Shin-Onna Tachiguishi Retsuden is part of the Kerberos Saga under the Tachiguishi Arc.

== Short films ==
=== Assault Girl: Hinako The Kentucky ===
Directed by Mamoru Oshii.

=== The Golden Fish Girl ===
Directed by Mamoru Oshii.

=== Dandelion: Mabu of the Dining Hall ===
Directed by Kenji Kamiyama.

=== Angel of the Songs ===
Directed by Makoto Kamiya.

=== Two Guns ===
Directed by Takanori Tsujimoto.

=== Whispers in the Grass: Kumi of the Frozen Strawberries ===
Directed by Hiroaki Yuasa.
