= Mako Hyōdō =

Japanese actress (born 1962)

- 兵藤 まこ
- Born: September 7, 1962 (age 63); Tokyo, Japan
- Occupations: Actress; voice actress; singer
- Years active: 1975–present
- Agent: 81 Produce
- Height: 151 cm (4 ft 11 in)

Mako Hyōdō (兵藤 まこ, Hyōdō Mako; born September 7, 1962), also credited as Mako Hyoudou (兵藤マコ), is a Japanese actress, voice actress and singer from Tokyo, Japan.

== Notable roles ==
- Girl in Angel's Egg
- Christella Revi in Birdy the Mighty: Decode
- Young Lady in The Red Spectacles
- Sharon Apple in Macross Plus
- Quanzitta Marison in Madlax
- Mayumi (Part 1) and Young Girl (Part 2) in Twilight Q
- Kogane Musashi in Ranma 1/2
- Creator (female) in Maze
- Ayaka Tateyama in Mekakucity Actors
- Hamushi in Outlaw Star
- Helena Bähbem in RahXephon
- Kōmi Natsuki in Sakura Diaries
- Kusumi in The Sky Crawlers
- Mazenda in Slayers NEXT
- Aphrodite in Wedding Peach
- Colonel Felme in Zoids: Genesis
- Foxy Croquette O-Gin in Tachiguishi-Retsuden
- Foxy Croquette O-Gin in Onna Tachiguishi-Retsuden
- Foxy Croquette O-Gin in Shin Onna Tachiguishi-Retsuden

== Tokusatsu ==
- Snake Lord/Anguis Femineus in Kamen Rider Agito
- Respider in Kamen Rider Ryuki
