= List of Kerberos Saga characters =

This is a list of characters and organizations in the Kerberos Saga (ケルベロス・サーガ, Keruberosu saga), a Japanese alternate history science fiction political thriller media franchise created by Mamoru Oshii in 1987. Set in an alternate history 20th century where Nazi Germany won World War II, eventually denazified, and occupied Japan (part of the Allies in this timeline) to establish authoritarian rule, the saga primarily follows members of the Metropolitan Security Police Organization's Special Armed Garrison, commonly referred to as "Kerberos", a heavily-militarized counterterrorist police tactical unit operating in Tokyo.

Characters are sorted by organizations or groups according to the original works. The English adaptation equivalents are mentioned when available.

== Metropolitan Security Police Organization ==
The Metropolitan Security Police Organization (首都圈治安警察機構, shutoken chian keisatsu kikō; lit. "capital region security police organization", abbreviated as Shutokei (首都警); "Capital Police" or "CAPO" in English adaptations), commonly shortened to just the Metropolitan Police (MP), is a paramilitary law enforcement agency established to maintain order in Tokyo and effectively combat terrorism where regular police cannot, providing a politically- and constitutionally-acceptable alternative to the domestic deployment of military forces.

=== Metropolitan Police Defense Division ===
The Metropolitan Police Defense Division (首都警・警備部, shutokei keibibu; lit. "capital police security division"; "Capital Area Security Police Agency" in English adaptations) is the main armed branch of the Metropolitan Police, tasked with maintaining public order. It maintains an armored combat unit, armored cars, a helicopter unit, and a sniper team. It is directed by Isao Aniya.

==== Special Armed Garrison "Kerberos" ====
The Special Armed Garrison (首都警・特機隊 ~ケルベロス~, shutokei tokki-tai ~keruberosu~; lit. "capital police special equipment unit"; "Special Unit" in English adaptations) is the core combat unit of the Metropolitan Police. Its members wear black-colored Protect Gears, armored powered exoskeletons that distinctively feature a Stahlhelm and a gas mask with glowing red lenses. Kerberos members are primarily armed with MG 42 machine guns (often using the bipod as a makeshift foregrip), although alternative weapons such as the StG 44 and FG 42 are also seen to be issued, with the Mauser C96 as a standard issue sidearm; additional ammunition is stored and dispensed from the Protect Gear's integrated backpack. It is headed by Shirou Tatsumi. Notable members include Koichi Todome, Soichiro Toribe, Midori Washio, Toru Inui, and Kazuki Fuse.

==== Jin-Roh ====
Jin-Roh (人狼, jinrō; lit. "man-wolf"; "Wolf Brigade" in English adaptations) is a secret counterintelligence unit formed inside Kerberos to protect it from threats within the police and government. It is headed by Hajime Handa.

=== Metropolitan Police Public Security Division ===
The Metropolitan Police Public Security Division (首都警・公安部, shutokei kōanbu; lit. 'capital police public order division') is the other branch of the Metropolitan Police, specializing in intelligence-gathering and espionage. It has an interservice rivalry with Kerberos. It is directed by Bunmei Muroto.

== Self-Police ==
The Asahikage, a symbol used by Japanese police

The Self-Police (自治警察, jichi keisatsu; "Local Police" in English adaptations) are the prefectural police—or, for works in the saga set before the 1954 Police Law, the municipal police—of a given prefecture or municipality, respectively.

=== Tokyo Metropolitan Self-Police Department ===
The Tokyo Metropolitan Self-Police Department (警視庁, Keishichō) is the Self-Police of Tokyo Metropolis or, for works implied to be set before 1954, Tokyo City. Into the late 1940s and the 1950s, they were unable to maintain public order in the face of spiking levels of terrorism and crime, sparking the creation of the Metropolitan Security Police Organization. The Self-Police and the Metropolitan Police share a jurisdiction over Tokyo and have many of the same duties, resulting in an uneasy relationship between them, though they are shown to cooperate with the Public Security Division more than Kerberos.

==== Spezial Sturm Gruppe ====
The Spezial Sturm Gruppe (SSG) is the elite counterterrorist police tactical unit of the Tokyo Metropolitan Self-Police Department. They are largely based on the German Federal Police's GSG 9 but are otherwise analogous to the Special Assault Teams of real Japanese police, and are essentially the Self-Police's version of the Metropolitan Police's Special Armed Garrison. In Kerberos Panzer Cop Act 4, they respond to the Lufthansa Flight 666 hijacking at Tokyo International Airport and are briefly involved in a standoff with Kerberos during a dispute over who will engage the hijackers. They are ultimately assigned to resolve the hijacking, but are beaten to the plane by Kerberos.

== Japan Self-Defense Forces ==
The Japan Self-Defense Forces (自衛隊, Jieitai) are the military of Japan. Under Article 9 of the Japanese Constitution, Japan is not permitted to go to war, and instead maintains a "defense force" for the country's own self-defense; though in real life this clause came about under American occupation, it can be assumed this also occurred under German occupation in the saga's timeline. The inability of the Japanese government to deploy the JSDF domestically to maintain public order led to the establishment of the Metropolitan Security Police Organization.

=== 1st Airborne Brigade ===
The 1st Airborne Brigade of the Japan Ground Self-Defense Force. It is a "Panzer Jäger Unit" (ギア部隊) or "Armored Soldier" (機甲隊員), essentially the military equivalent of the Metropolitan Police's Special Armed Garrison, and is likewise also equipped with Protect Gears; however, they primarily use anti-tank rifles instead of machine guns. It is led by Tetsurō Kai.

- Tetsurō Kai (甲斐哲朗)

Appearances: Kerberos Panzer Cop - Part II (Act 5 and Act 8)
The commanding officer of the 1st Airborne Brigade. He infiltrates Kerberos as a trainee and, impressed by Midori, invites her to a JGSDF public exhibition held at Mount Fuji. When Midori goes there with fellow instructor Hachiro Tohbe, they see Tetsurō Kai presenting JGSDF Protect Gear. Later, Kai leads the 1st Airborne Brigade against Kerberos during the Kerberos Uprising.

== Anti-government movements and terrorist groups ==
Various anti-government movements that were formed or otherwise grew as a result of, or in response to, increasing economic, social, and political tensions following the German occupation, the creation of the Weimar Establishment, and the resulting internationalization and urbanization of Japan. Economic reorganization under the Weimar Establishment led to increased poverty, class stratification, and the growth of slums, as well as spikes in organized crime and black market corruption, all of which in turn led to large protests in Tokyo. The government responded with police repression and authoritarian policies that ultimately worsened the situation, forcing public protest movements underground and radicalizing them to become underground guerilla militias and terrorist groups.

=== The Sect ===
The Sect (セクト, sekuto) is a left-wing terrorist group that emerged from mergers of other anti-government and leftist movements, especially after the Metropolitan Police and Kerberos began cracking down on such groups. The Sect relies on the Tokyo sewers to transport and store firearms and explosives. Notably, young girls wearing red clothing, nicknamed Little Red Riding Hoods (赤ずきん, Akazukin), are used by the Sect's Division Jacobson (ヤコブソン機関) to smuggle materiel, most commonly bombs, using their non-threatening appearances to smuggle without drawing suspicion.

- Nanami Agawa (阿川七生)

Aliases: Kurzhaar (Short Hairs)
Cast: Eri Sendai
Appearances: Jin-Roh
An adolescent girl used as a Little Red Riding Hood by the Sect. When confronted by Kerberos member Kazuki Fuse while attempting to flee in the sewers, Nanami detonated the bomb she was carrying instead of surrendering or allowing other Kerberos members to execute her, killing herself and causing a power outage during a riot. A character similar to Nanami, but not specifically her, appears in Kerberos Panzer Cop Act 2.

- Kei Amemiya (雨宮圭)

Appearances: Jin-Roh
Cast: Sumi Mutoh
A 17–18-year-old girl who originally worked as a Little Red Riding Hood until she was caught by the Public Security Division, who proceeded to use her to entrap a Kerberos member—Kazuki Fuse, with whom she developed a friendship—and ruin the unit's reputation. Fuse learns of the plan and rescues Kei from Public Security with assistance from Jin-Roh, but is ultimately forced to kill her to protect her from being pursued by Public Security forever.

- Foxy Croquette O-Gin

Appearances: The Red Spectacles, Kerberos & Tachiguishi, Tachiguishi-Retsuden, Onna-Tachiguishi Retsuden
Cast: Mitsuhisa Ishikawa, Mako Hyōdō
A Little Red Riding Hood courier until she was caught by Kerberos. Brought to the Public Security Division, she was used as a mole by Bunmei Muroto. She was a tachiguishi from 1946 to approximately 1960. She appears in The Red Spectacles as a silent young lady who leads Koichi Todome through Tokyo; the film's trailer introduces her as an allegory for fate. After the National Diet Building incident, Foxy Croquette left Tokyo and reappeared in the West Bank as a guerrilla known as "AK Ginko".

- Kusaba (草場)

Appearances: Kerberos Panzer Cop (Act 2)
A saboteur who infiltrates the Metropolitan Police to sabotage Kerberos's new Fa-666 "Jagdhund" attack helicopter.

=== Four Seasons League ===
The Four Seasons League (四季協会, shiki kyokai) is a communist terrorist group. A splinter group of the Sect, it was formed after the Sect's leaders made a compromise with the government to disassociate with its most extreme and violent members. Its background and modus operandi resemble those of the real-life Japanese Red Army.

- Kazuya Fujiwara (藤原 和也)

Appearances: Kerberos Panzer Cop - Part I
The 28-year-old leader of the Four Seasons League. He hijacks Lufthansa Flight 666 at Tokyo International Airport, apparently with the intent of facing off with Kerberos, and sends another group to attack the German Embassy as a diversion. After a battle with Kerberos members Koichi Todome, Midori Washio, and Soichiro Toribe aboard Flight 666 leads to it crash-landing on Showa Island, Fujiwara survives, but is shot and killed by Midori before he can be apprehended by the Self-Police.

== Fast Food Grifters ==
Tachiguishi (たちぐいし, tachigui; "Fast Food Grifters" in English adaptations) are con artists known for committing dine and dash crimes at tachigui (立ち食い; "eating while standing up"), a type of Japanese fast-food restaurant or style of eating where patrons stand as opposed to sitting that, in the saga's universe, have been made illegal.

- Moongaze Ginji (月見の銀二)

Cast: Hideyo Amamoto, Kaito Kisshoji
A famous tachiguishi and one of Koichi Todome's friends.

- Cold Badger Masa (冷しタヌキの政)

Appearances: Kerberos Panzer Cop (Act 6)
Cast: Toshio Suzuki
A tachiguishi who is killed by Kerberos member Chuichi Koshiramaru at a tachigui over a misdemeanor offense. His death is one of the catalysts that leads to Kerberos's dissolution.

- Crying Inumaru (哭きの犬丸)
- Beefbowl Ushigoro (牛丼の牛五郎)

Cast: Shinji Higuchi

- Hamburger Tetsu (ハンバーガーの哲)

Cast: Kenji Kawai

- Frankfurter Tatsu (フランクフルトの辰)

Cast: Katsuya Terada

- Medium Hot Sabu (中辛のサブ)

Cast: Shoji Kawamori

- Baked Bean Pastry Amataro (焼きあん甘太郎)
- Crepe Mami (クレープのマミ)

== German military ==
The German military is the main protagonist faction in the Kerberos Panzer Jäger radio drama series. Though they are initially the Wehrmacht under Nazi Germany, they are eventually restored to the Reichswehr following the assassination of Adolf Hitler and the following denazification process.

=== 808th Propagandakompanie ===
The 808th Propagandakompanie (立ち食い, Dai 808 Senden Chutai) is a unit of the Wehrmacht during World War II, deployed on the Eastern Front.

- Cpt. Maki Stauffenberg (マキ・シュタウフェンヴェルク大尉)

Appearances: Kerberos Panzer Jäger
Cast: Yoshiko Sakakibara
The leader of the Wehrmacht's 808th German Propaganda Company (808th Propagandakompanie, 第808宣伝中隊). She leaves the Warsaw station to deliver Protect Gear parts to the 101st Panzer Company fighting the Soviet Army at the Battle of Stalingrad.

== Other characters ==
- Tang Mie (唐密, タンミー)

Appearances: StrayDog
Cast: Sue Eaching
A Taiwanese girl that used to live with Koichi Todome when the latter flew to Taipei during his post-Kerberos Riot exile. When Inui visits Taiwan to find Todome and bring him back to Tokyo, he meets and befriends Mie, and the two of them search for Todome. They find him as a peaceful peasant inviting them to start their life anew living in a ménage à trois. Mie has a platonic love relationship with Todome and Inui; Todome tells Inui "she was her who picked up both of [them]".

- Sabu (サブちゃん)

Appearances: Kerberos & Tachiguishi
A young boy who, despite his age, is fascinated by the Anpo protests and supports them.

- Manager Kamiyama

Appearances: Tachiguishi-Retsuden
Cast: Kenji Kamiyama

- Tokumitsu Shinada

Appearances: Tachiguishi-Retsuden
Cast: Fuyuki Shinada

- Papa's Waitress (パパスのウェイトレス)

Appearances: Kerberos Saga Rainy Dogs (The Killers)
A waitress at Papa's Lunch Room. She talks to the killers searching for Koichi Todome.

== Cameo characters ==
- Detective Takahiro Matsui (松井 孝弘)

Appearances: Kerberos Panzer Cop (Act 6)
Original work: Patlabor
A police detective assigned to solve the murder of Cold Badger Masa by Chuichi Koshiramaru. Oshii is closely related to the production of Detective Matsui's original work, Patlabor, having directed Patlabor: The Movie and Patlabor 2: The Movie.

- Golgo 13 (東郷十三)

Appearances: Kerberos Saga Rainy Dogs (The Killers)
Original work: Golgo 13
Golgo 13, also named Duke Togo (デューク東郷), an assassin among the other killers at Papa's Lunch Room. While waiting at a table, he goes to the washroom with a present and comes back with his famous scoped M16 rifle. In the ensuing shootout between the killers in the restaurant, he shoots one killer but is shot in the chest and killed by another.
