= StrayDog: Kerberos Panzer Cops =

- Original theatrical poster
- Directed by: Mamoru Oshii
- Written by: Mamoru Oshii
- Based on: Characters created by Mamoru Oshii
- Produced by: Sumiaki Ueno; Daisuke Hayashi
- Starring: Yoshikatsu Fujiki; Shigeru Chiba; Sue Eaching; Takashi Matsuyama
- Cinematography: Yosuke Mamiya
- Edited by: Seiji Morita
- Music by: Kenji Kawai
- Distributed by: Shochiku
- Release dates: March 23, 1991 (Japan); March 23, 2003 (US)
- Running time: 99 minutes
- Country: Japan
- Languages: Japanese; Taiwanese Mandarin

StrayDog: Kerberos Panzer Cops (ケルベロス 地獄の番犬, Keruberosu: Jigoku no Banken; lit. 'Kerberos: Watchdog of Hell') is a 1991 Japanese science fiction film written and directed by Mamoru Oshii and starring Shigeru Chiba and Yoshikatsu Fujiki. The second film in the Kerberos Saga and a prequel to 1987's The Red Spectacles, the film follows Inui, a former member of the elite Special Armed Garrison "Kerberos" police tactical unit who, after being arrested following a failed rebellion by his unit, is paroled three years later and travels to Taiwan to search for Koichi Todome, an elite Kerberos member who left Japan.

Unlike The Red Spectacles, StrayDog adopts the setting and theming of Oshii's manga Kerberos Panzer Cop, which established some of the Kerberos Saga's setting and background; however, as the manga was not finished by StrayDog's release, some aspects of the film, such as its time period and details surrounding Kerberos, differ from the events established in the manga by its conclusion in 2000.

StrayDog was released on March 23, 1991 in Japan. An anime film serving as a prequel, Jin-Roh: The Wolf Brigade, was released in 1999, further establishing details about Kerberos and the saga's established setting.

== Plot ==
In the 20th century, the Japanese government establishes a paramilitary law enforcement agency called the Special Armed Garrison, nicknamed "Kerberos", to quell a rise in crime and terrorism that the Tokyo Metropolitan Police Department cannot handle. To effectively perform their duties, Kerberos is heavily militarized, equipped with automatic firearms and nearly bulletproof powered exoskeletons called "Protect Gears". Though Kerberos succeeds in stopping crime, their conduct becomes increasingly unacceptable over time, and after several incidents of violence and police brutality they are ordered to disarm and disband; however, the members of Kerberos refuse and instead hold out against government forces in a rebellion called the "Kerberos Uprising". Besieged in a compound for an indeterminate but lengthy amount of time, the increasingly weary Kerberos members prepare to make their last stand when elite Kerberos members Koichi Todome, Washio Midori, and Soichiro Toribe are called to the compound's central building. There, Kerberos member Inui witnesses Todome boarding a helicopter to leave the country and angrily asks why he is fleeing instead of fighting alongside his men, but receives no response as the helicopter leaves; shortly after, the Japan Ground Self-Defense Force breaches the compound, killing or apprehending the rest of Kerberos.

Three years later, Inui is released from prison on parole and begins searching for Todome. Hayashi, Inui's contact from the Fugitive Support Group, informs him that Todome was exiled in Taiwan, prompting him to travel there. Unbeknownst to Inui, Hayashi is an agent of the Public Security Division (公安部隊), an intelligence agency that engineered Inui's release and is using him to locate Todome on their behalf, as they believe Todome intends to reestablish Kerberos abroad. Arriving in Taipei, Inui meets Tang Mie, a Taiwanese girl that Todome lived with until he left her as well. Inui befriends her as they search for Todome in Taipei and Tainan. Eventually, they find Todome living as a rural fisherman. After a brief brawl, Inui and Todome calm down.

Hayashi contacts Inui to propose a deal: either Todome surrenders and the Japanese government will be forgiving and allow him to stay in Taiwan with Mie, or Todome remains a fugitive and him, Mie, and Inui will be hunted for the rest of their lives by Public Security, who have deployed a team to search for them. Inui learns Todome kept his Kerberos Protect Gear and MG 42, possibly the last remaining Kerberos-issued equipment since the Uprising, and beats Todome in a fight, allowing him to take it. Inui confronts Hayashi at their rendezvous point, captures him, and orders him to help him don the Protect Gear.

Now equipped with Todome's Protect Gear and MG 42, Inui enters an abandoned hotel where the Public Security unit is based and battles them, annihilating the unit but being wounded in the process. After killing the rest of the unit at an abandoned Kerberos facility, he is shot under the Protect Gear's armor by the unit's leader and killed.

After Inui's death, Todome, now alone in Taiwan, chooses to return to Tokyo.

== Cast ==
- Yoshikatsu Fujiki (藤木義勝) as Inui (乾)
- Shigeru Chiba as Kōichi Todome (都々目紅一)
- Sue Eaching (蘇意菁) as Tang Mie
- Takashi Matsuyama (松山鷹志) as Hayashi aka "Man in White" (白服の男)

== Audio ==
The OST Stray Dog Original Soundtrack is included as a bonus disc (DVD case) in the North American edition. As a comparison the bonus CD available in the Japanese release, Night Show, features the trilogy soundtrack, with 5 tracks per movie, plus 2 unreleased numbers from Akai Megane.

- March 21, 1991 (Japan): StrayDog: Kerberos Panzer Cops [CD] (Apollon, BCCE-1)

11 tracks

- February 25, 2003 (Japan): Mamoru Oshii Cinema Trilogy [4DVD+1CD+1BOOK] (Bandai Visual / Emotion, BCBJ-1519)

5 tracks

- March 26, 2003 (Japan): Kenji Kawai Cinema Anthology [5CD] (King Record / Star Child, KICA-9601~4)

11 + 1 tracks

- November 4, 2003 (U.S.): Mamoru Oshii Cinema Trilogy [3DVD+1CD] (Bandai Entertainment, 2430)

11 tracks

- November 4, 2003 (Canada): Mamoru Oshii Cinema Trilogy [3DVD+1CD] (Bandai Entertainment, 2430)

11 tracks

=== Video ===
The LD "upgrade edition" includes a bonus disc featuring one hour of extra material including the documentary Dog Days. The latter was made available in the Dog Days After bonus disc available in the Japanese Mamoru Oshii Cinema Trilogy boxset. This boxset was released in North America without the extra, namely a 76 pages book and Dog Days After.

- September 25, 1991 (Japan): Keruberosu: Jigoku no Banken [VHS] (Bandai Visual, BES-567)
- December 19, 1991 (Japan): StrayDog: Kerberos Panzer Cops (upgrade edition) [2LD] (Bandai Visual / Emotion, BELL-475)
- February 25, 2003 (Japan): Mamoru Oshii Cinema Trilogy [4DVD+1CD+1BOOK] (Bandai Visual / Emotion, BCBJ-1519)
- November 4, 2003 (U.S.): Mamoru Oshii Cinema Trilogy [3DVD+1CD] (Bandai Entertainment, 2430)
- November 4, 2003 (Canada): Mamoru Oshii Cinema Trilogy [3DVD+1CD] (Bandai Entertainment, 2430) English subtitled
- November 4, 2003 (U.S.): StrayDog: Kerberos Panzer Cops [DVD] (Bandai Entertainment, 2432B) English subtitled

== Awards ==
- Officially invited to the Japanese Yubari International Fantastic Film Festival in February 1991.
