= Kerberos Panzer Jäger =

Japanese radio drama series

Kerberos Panzer Jäger (ケルベロス 鋼鉄の猟犬, Keruberosu kōtetsu no ryōken, lit. Kerberos Hound of Steel) is a 2006 radio drama series written by Japanese filmmaker and novelist Mamoru Oshii. It first aired in Nippon Cultural Broadcasting.

== Story ==
=== Background information ===
Kerberos Panzer Jager is part of the Kerberos Saga multimedia franchise. While most of the saga's installments concern the downfall of the Tokyo police's armored Kerberos Unit, Kerberos Panzer Jager is a prequel set during an alternate World War II. In this timeline, the United States remained isolationist, refusing to enter the war, while the Empire of Japan allied itself with Britain and France against Nazi Germany. In this alternate timeline, Hitler has been successfully assassinated by Claus von Stauffenberg, leading to a purge of Nazi elements from the government. Advanced suits of powered armor, called 'Protect Gear', allow the Germans to win the Battle of Stalingrad. The term Panzer Jäger in the title refers not to tank-hunter units, as in real life, but to these armored infantry units, whose equipment goes on to form the basis for the Kerberos Unit's armor in later installments.

=== Plot ===
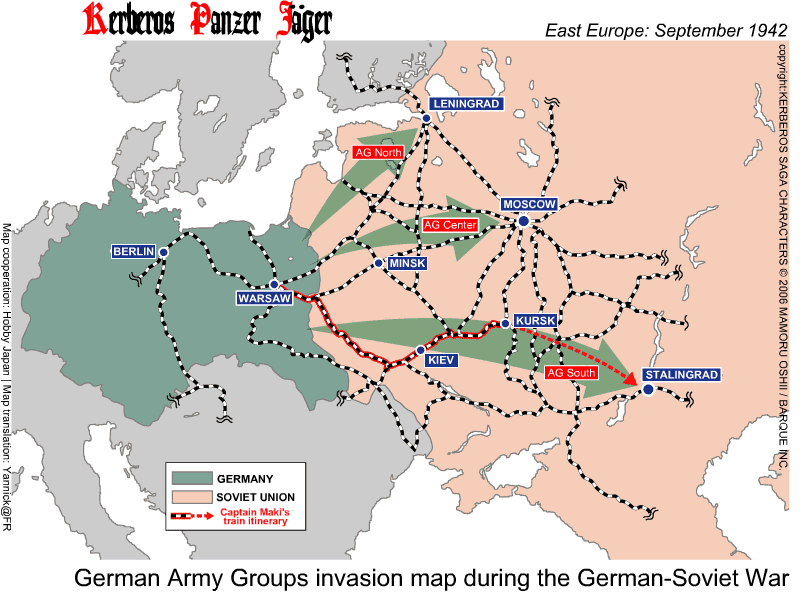
English map of Cpt. Maki's route from Warsaw to Stalingrad (courtesy of Hobby Japan)

In September 1942, Captain Maki Stauffenberg, in command of the 808th Propagandakompanie, leaves Warsaw station on an armored train to start her long journey into Soviet territory. A filmmaker originally affiliated with UFA GmBH, she has been tasked with creating a propaganda film about the exploits of the 101st Panzer Jäger Battalion. Tainted by association with the displaced Nazi regime, the 101st has been committed to bloody frontline battles against the Soviets without respite, achieving stunning combat results in the process. However, Maki Stauffenberg, the half-Japanese niece of Hitler's killer, has taken on the mission for her own reasons.

=== Characters ===
- Captain Maki Stauffenberg
- Sergeant Major Hollerbach
- Corporal Lauth
- Captain Deisler
- Major Klose
- Sergeant Beinlich
- Sergeant Kahn

== Chapters ==
=== Interview program ===
- 2006.04.26: Interview Part.1: Radio drama's appeal

(ラジオドラマの魅力を探る)

- 2006.04.26: Interview Part.2: Listeners questions about Kerberos Panzer Jäger

(ケルベロス鋼鉄の猟犬)を語る

- 2006.04.26: Kenji Kawai & Mamoru Oshii

(川井憲次×押井守)

=== Drama program ===
==== Act I: Armoured Train ====
(装甲列車編, Sōkō ressha hen)

- 2006.04.31: Vol.1: Propagandakompanie (Propaganda Company)

(宣伝中隊, Senden chūtai)

- 2006.06.28: Vol.2: Kursk

(クルスク, Kurusuku)

- 2006.07.26: Vol.3: Kriegspferd (Charger)

(軍馬, Gunba)

==== Act II: Panzer Jäger ====
(装甲猟兵, Sōkō ryoū hei)

- 2006.08.30: Vol.1: Die Langen Kerle Potsdam (Potsdam Giant Guards)

(ポツダムの巨人兵, Potsudamu no kyojin hei)

- 2006.09.27: Vol.2: Die Dritte Armee (The Third Army)

(第三の軍隊, Daisan no gunntai)

==== Act III: Blitzkrieg ====
(電撃戦, Dengeki sen)

- 2006.11.10: Vol.1: Blumenkrieg (Flower War)

(花の戦争, Hana no sennsou)

- 2006.11.24: Vol.2: Westaufklärung (Study of the West)

(西方研究, Seihō kenkyu)

==== Act IV: Barbarossa ====
(バルバロッサ, barubarossa)

- 2007.01.12: Vol.1: Säuberung (Purge)

(粛清, Syukusei)

== Licensed products ==
=== Books ===
- (Japan) 2007.04: Kerberos Panzer Jäger Official Guide Book (official guide book)

Japanese text, Mamoru Oshii, Barque, 32p.

== Production ==
=== Cast ===
- Yoshiko Sakakibara: Cpt. Maki Stauffenberg (マキ・シュタウフェンヴェルク大尉)
- Michihiro Ikemizu: Sgt. Major Hollerbach (ホラーバッハ曹長)
- Yuya Uchida: Cpl. Lauth (ラウト伍長)
- Masashi Ebara: Cpt. Deisler (ダイスラー大尉)
- Ikuya Sawaki: Mjr. Klose (クローゼ少佐)
- Tetsuo Goto: Sgt. Beinlich (バインリヒ軍曹)
- Otoya Kawano Sgt. Kahn (カーン軍曹)

=== Production staff ===
- Original story / Scenario / Director: Mamoru Oshii
- Music: Kenji Kawai
- Sound director: Kazuhiro Wakabayashi
- Recording: 宮澤二郎
- Effects: 伊藤道広 (Soundring)
- 音楽制作: 安田玲子 / 仲野智子 / 奥澤麻由美 / 大久保絵美 (Aube Inc.)
- 音響制作担当: 好永伸恵
- 音響制作: フォニシア
- 録音Studio: Tokyo TV Center
- Supervisor: 小泉聰

=== Recording staff ===
- Recording Engineer: Kitagawa Teruaki / Kyouhei Fukushiro
- Strings: 内田輝 Group
- A.Piano: Tohru Shigemi
- Keyboards: Kenji Kawai
- Recording studio: 一口坂 Studio / Aube Studio / i@ Recording Studio
- Assistant Engineer: 山本篤士 / 中田武士 / 菊地和孝 (一口坂 Studio) / 長谷部智子 (Aube Studio) / 見留由紀 (i@ Recording Studio)

=== Musical theme ===
- Die Antwort ("the answer"):

Composer: Paolo Bozzola
Arrangement: Kenji Kawai
Vocal: Akane Kawabe

== See also ==
- Battle of Stalingrad
- Operation Barbarossa
- Battle of Kursk

== Notes ==
The surnames of the German soldiers seem to be taken from professional soccer players Bernd Hollerbach, Benjamin Lauth, Sebastian Deisler, Miroslav Klose, Stefan Beinlich and Oliver Kahn.

On late May 2006, Mamoru Oshi announced plans to direct an anime adaptation of Kerberos Panzer Jäger, to be produced in 2009 with the use of 3DCG. However, there has been no recent news regarding this project.

Images of the Last Battalion, a short CGI fan film produced in 2005 featuring German power armor suits in a WW2 setting, was screened at the Kerberos saga radio drama series launch party as a trailer.

== Sources ==
- Kerberos Panzer Jäger official website (Japanese)
- Kerberos Panzer Jäger@Raiden Kinema channel 2 (kinema) (Japanese)
- Kerberos Panzer Jäger@Raiden Kinema channel 9 (archives) (Japanese)
- Mamoru Oshii's official website (Japanese)
- Kenji Kawai's official website (Japanese/English)
- JOQR Radio (Japanese)
- Images of the Last Battalion@Digital Frontier Grand Prix 2005 (Japanese)
- DCAJ Digital Contents Association of Japan (Japanese/English)
- Digital Hollywood (Japanese)
- Axis Animation (English)
- Watch Impress (Japanese)
