= Class stratification =

Form of social categorization

Class stratification is a form of social stratification in which a society is separated into parties whose members have different access to resources and power. An economic, natural, cultural, religious, interests and ideal rift usually exists between different classes.

== Process of class stratification ==
In the early stages of class stratification, the majority of members in a given society have similar access to wealth and power, with only a few members displaying noticeably more or less wealth than the rest.

As time goes on, the largest share of wealth and status can begin to concentrate around a small number of the population. When wealth continues to concentrate, pockets of society with significantly less wealth may develop, until a sharp imbalance between rich and poor is created. As members of a society spread out from one another economically, classes are created.

When a physical gap is added, a cultural rift between the classes comes into existence, an example being the perception of the well-mannered, "cultured" behavior of the rich, versus the "uncivilized" behavior of the poor. With the cultural divide, chances for classes to intermingle become less and less likely, and mythos becomes more and more common between them (i.e. "the wrong side of the railroad tracks"). The lower class loses more of its influence and wealth as the upper class gains more influence and wealth, further dividing the classes from one another.

== Class schema ==
Social class is usually regarded as being conceived of as sets of positions rather than as individuals who happen to fill them at any particular time. Class structure is the “empty spaces” that persons occupy without altering the shape of the class structure.

Erik Olin Wright produced class schemata, in attempts to retain a Marxist approach to class analysis. In Wright’s first schema he states that in capitalism simple production exists alongside the capitalist mode of production. In this schema the bourgeoisie, the self-employed working who engage in simple production are one class. In the model there are two distinctive classes, the bourgeoisie and the proletariat. The bourgeoisie owns the means of production, and the proletariat are the exploited workers. Both of these classes can be broken down into six classes that make up Wright’s first schema. The supervisors and managers are in a contradictory class because they dominate over the proletariat and yet they are still dominated by the bourgeoisie. The small employers are both petty bourgeois and bourgeois; and the semi-autonomous employees while they do not own the means of production, they benefit from having more autonomy over their work than the normal proletariat. These classes are based upon exploitation and domination. Exploitation exists between those who own the means of production and those who do not. Domination is measured according to the amount of autonomy that can be exercised by the workers and to which extent they are supervised.

Wright’s second schema involve a 12-class schema and is based upon exploitation. In the second schemata exploitation has three dimensions: ownership of the means of production, ownership of organization assets that permit control and coordination of technical processes of production, and ownership of skills or credentials.

John Goldthorpe's class schema is to differentiate positions within labor markets and production units, or more specifically to differentiate such positions in terms of the employment relations that they entail. Goldthorpe schema distinguishes the employers, the self-employed, and employees. Within the group of employees eleven classes are defined on the basis of the employment relationship they enjoy. The aim of the schema is to group occupational title/employment relations, and the employment relationships joined by given combinations may differ cross-nationally.

As the theories relate to class stratification the common characteristic shared by the actors involve the position they occupy in relations defined by labor markets and productive processes. Class has often been defined as the significant determinant of life chances. The deliberate acts of individual actors are undertaken from a position of social power which is determined by class membership. The resources an individual possesses and the constraints they face and the course of action they take leads to having a higher probability of being undertaken than others. These processes lead to class position becoming a powerful predictor of many kinds of behavior.

Paul Fussell wrote extensively in n the topic, including his book, Class : a guide through the American status system.

== Class and race ==
It can be argued that segregation between black and white ethnic groups is so strong in some countries that they are different classes, and thus that segregation is a form of class stratification. Although there is a definite divide in some countries between races, those countries will also have poor people of the "upper class" ethnicity.

== See also ==
- Caste system
- Class conflict
- Class consciousness
- Cultural elitism
- Social mobility
- Classism
- Economic inequality
- Elitism
- Oppression
- Wealth inequality in the United States
- Social Class
- Social stratification
