= The Red Spectacles =

1987 Japanese film

- 20-year anniversary movie poster
- Directed by: Mamoru Oshii
- Written by: Kazunori Itō; Mamoru Oshii
- Based on: Characters created by Mamoru Oshii
- Produced by: Shigeharu Shiba; Daisuke Hayashi
- Starring: Shigeru Chiba; Machiko Washio; Hideyuki Tanaka
- Cinematography: Yosuke Mamiya
- Edited by: Seiji Morita
- Music by: Kenji Kawai
- Distributed by: Omnibus Promotion
- Release date: February 7, 1987
- Running time: 116 minutes
- Country: Japan
- Language: Japanese

The Red Spectacles (紅い眼鏡, Akai Megane) is a 1987 Japanese science fiction neo-noir film directed by Mamoru Oshii, co-written with Kazunori Ito, and starring Shigeru Chiba and Mako Hyōdō. The first film in Oshii's Kerberos Saga, but the second installment overall after its radio drama companion piece While Waiting for the Red Spectacles (which aired a month prior), the film follows Kōichi Todome, a former police tactical unit officer who, after fleeing Japan following a failed rebellion by his dissolved unit, returns several years later per a promise to his colleagues, only to find Tokyo in a surreal and unrecognizable state.

The Red Spectacles was released on February 7, 1987. It would be followed by several works intended to explain and expand the film's universe, the most notable of them being Kerberos Panzer Cop. The film was followed by two prequels—StrayDog: Kerberos Panzer Cops in 1991, and Jin-Roh: The Wolf Brigade in 1999—that adapted the established stories and settings from Kerberos Panzer Cop.

Kamui Fujiwara adapted the film into a manga in 2024.

== Plot ==
In the 20th century, the Tokyo Metropolitan Police Department, struggling to handle rising crime in Tokyo, establishes the Anti-Vicious Crime Heavily Armored Mobile Special Investigations Unit, nicknamed "Kerberos", a heavily-armed police tactical unit tasked with combating violent crime, equipped with machine guns and armored reinforcement gear. However, while Kerberos succeeds in its mission, by the 1990s, its overzealous actions and fanatical hatred of "evil" lead to it becoming increasingly aggressive, cruel, and corrupt. When a Kerberos member beats a misdemeanor offender to death, it sparks a massive controversy that leads to the unit's disbandment. However, three elite Kerberos members—Kōichi Todome, Washio Midori, and Sōichirō Toribe—refuse to disarm and flee to the Port of Tokyo, where they plan to escape in a helicopter. After repelling an ambush by bounty hunters, a grievously injured Sōichirō and Midori order Todome to leave in the helicopter alone, but they make a promise that Todome will return for them.

Three years later, Todome, now a fugitive from the government, returns to Tokyo, but finds the city inexplicably no longer resembles the one he left behind: the buildings have decayed at an exponential rate, and everything is strange, surreal, and nondescript. He wanders, trying to find some semblance of his past and to find Sōichirō and Midori, and along the way encounters strange and unusual characters—a mysterious young lady clad in red, hitmen led by Bunmei Muroto, and eccentric con artists called tachiguishi who swindle inexplicably-illegal stand-and-eat food stalls (tachigui) after they were deemed to violate public order and standard of decency.

In the end, it is revealed that most of the film’s events were a dying dream: Todome was attacked and killed in a shower soon after returning to Tokyo. His suitcase, expected to contain his armor, is instead filled with red spectacles, to Bunmei's dismay. The lady in red watches Todome's body being carried away, then takes a taxi to seek her next "dream".

== Cast ==
- Shigeru Chiba as Kōichi Todome
- Machiko Washio as Washio Midori
- Hideyuki Tanaka as Sōichirō Toribe
- Tesshō Genda as Bunmei Muroto (Reappears in the unrelated Gosenzo-sama Banbanzai!)
- Mako Hyōdō as Young Lady
- Hideyo Amamoto as Moongaze Ginji
- Offscreen actors as Hamburger Tetsu, Beefbowl Ushigoro, Medium Hot Sabu, Baked Bean Pastry Amataro, and Crepe Mami
- Ichirō Nagai as Middle-aged man in billiards, taxi driver's voice
- Yasuo Ōtsuka as Taxi driver
- Oikawa Hiroe as Oriental Hotel receptionist
- Fuyuki Shinada as Soba Udon cook
- Fumi Hirano as Airport announcer
- Kintaroh Sakata as Umibōzu

== Production ==
The Red Spectacles is Oshii's first feature-length live-action film. Several of the cast members are voice actors and appeared in Urusei Yatsura, which Oshii worked on as chief director and head writer.

The film features a number of literary references including William Shakespeare's Julius Caesar and Alexander Pushkin's The Captain's Daughter. A variety of philosophical concepts such as free will and determinism are presented through fables including "The Magnet's Story," attributed to Oscar Wilde, and The Fisherman and the Jinni. Kerberos is the original pronunciation of Cerberus, the three-headed watchdog in Greek mythology, and the film concludes with a visual reference to Little Red Riding Hood.

== Releases ==
The Red Spectacles premiered on February 7, 1987 in Japan.

On February 25, 2003, the DVD edition was made available in Japan as part of the Mamoru Oshii Cinema Trilogy anthology box set, which contained four DVDs and one soundtrack CD. On November 4 of the same year, a subtitled version of Akai megane was released in North America as both a single DVD and also as part of a US release of the box set. The US version of the trilogy box set has different box artwork and lacks the "Revisited Scene & Production" DVD of the Japanese version.

The American The Red Spectacles DVD edition was reprinted in 2004, and since then is only available in the box set which was printed three times as of 2006 and remains the only edition released outside Japan.

A crowdfunded 4K restoration of the film was shown at the 2025 edition of Beyond Fest and then at the New York Metrograph theater in November 2025.

== Reception ==
The A.V. Club, reviewing it as part of the 2003 DVD release with the other parts of the trilogy, called the story "alternately hilarious, bizarre, and incoherent, right up to the disappointingly conventional ending."

Screen Rant's Gregory Nussen, reviewing the film at its 2025 Beyond Fest screening, said that fans of Oshii's later film Ghost in the Shell "will recognize the paranoia here over totalitarianism and Oshii's play with light and flatness of image. But they might not recognize just how glib and jovial the film is, despite its unflinching dark presentation of modern society. [...] The Red Spectacles is not always successful. It is overlong, and frequently bogged down by its irreverance. But at its core, the film functions as a fundamental question about whom, or what, is responsible for the pervasive evil in any society. [...] In its most provocative form, Oshii's film poses the existential possibility that if our world feels like a constant, surrealist fever dream, perhaps it really is."
