= 2008 in animation =

2008 in animation is an overview of notable events, including notable awards, list of films released, television show debuts and endings, and notable deaths.

== Events ==
=== January ===
- January 20: Season 5 of Aqua Teen Hunger Force begins on Adult Swim with the premiere of the episode "Robots Everywhere". The episode was originally released as a bonus feature on the video game Aqua Teen Hunger Force Zombie Ninja Pro-Am.

=== February ===
- February 1: Disney Channel holds a month-long event called "Phineas and Ferb-ruary" to celebrate the official premiere of its newest series Phineas and Ferb, starting with the episode "Flop Starz".
- February 4:
  - The first episode of The Mr. Men Show airs.
  - The Phineas and Ferb episode "Raging Bully" premieres on Disney Channel, which marks the debut of Baljeet Tjinder, Phineas & Ferb's friend who would end up becoming a major supporting character later on in the show.
- February 5: The Phineas and Ferb episode "Candace Loses Her Head" premieres on Disney Channel, which marks the debut of Lawrence Fletcher, Ferb's biological father and Phineas & Candace's stepfather.
- February 8: The Phineas and Ferb episode "The Magnificent Few" premieres on Disney Channel, which marks the debut of Dr. Doofenshmirtz's teenage daughter Vanessa Doofenshmirtz, who eventually became a favorite amongst fans of the show.
- February 11: Nina Paley's Sita Sings the Blues premieres at the Berlin International Film Festival.
- February 18: Nickelodeon celebrates the revival of The Fairly OddParents with the Season 6 premiere movie "Fairly OddBaby", which introduces Cosmo & Wanda's son Poof to the show. It is the first new episode since 2006.
- February 24: 80th Academy Awards:
  - Ratatouille, directed by Brad Bird and produced by Pixar and the Walt Disney Company, wins the Academy Award for Best Animated Feature.
  - Peter & the Wolf by Suzie Templeton and Hugh Welchman wins the Academy Award for Best Animated Short Film.
- February 26: Bratz airs its final episode.

=== March ===
- March 1: Johnny Test concludes its third season on the Kids' WB block on The CW with the two-part episodes "Johnny X: A New Beginning/Johnny X: The Final Ending". This was the last episode to premiere on The CW as the Kids' WB block would go defunct on May 17. The show would move over to Cartoon Network for the remainder of its run, beginning with the premiere of its fourth season the following year.
- March 3: Season 6 of SpongeBob SquarePants begins on Nickelodeon with the premiere of the episode "Krabby Road". The season's premiere brought in a total of 4.7 million viewers that night.
- March 6: Foster's Home for Imaginary Friends concludes its fifth season on Cartoon Network with the episode "Let Your Hare Down".
- March 8: Doraemon: Nobita and The Green Giant Legend is released.
- March 12: Season 12 of South Park begins on Comedy Central with the premiere of the episode "Tonsil Trouble". It was seen by over 3 million viewers that night.
- March 13: The 6th and final season of Foster's Home for Imaginary Friends begins on Cartoon Network with the premiere of the episode "Jackie Khones and the Case of the Overdue Library Crook".
- March 14: Horton Hears a Who!, directed by Jimmy Hayward and Steve Martino, produced by Blue Sky Studios and 20th Century Fox, is first released. It received favorable reviews as it hues closer to the original source material.
- March 22: The final episode of Tom and Jerry Tales premieres on the Kids' WB block on The CW.
- March 23:
  - Futurama returns to the air on Comedy Central after being cancelled in 2003.
  - Aqua Teen Hunger Force concludes its fifth season on Adult Swim with the episode "Bible Fruit (Fruits)".

=== April ===
- April 9:
  - The South Park episode "Eek, a Penis!" premieres on Comedy Central. Ms. Garrison ends up getting another sex reassignment surgery operation in this episode, making her MR. Garrison once again.
  - Disney Channel renewed Phineas and Ferb for a second season.
- April 19: The Phineas and Ferb episode "Greece Lightning" premieres on Disney Channel, which marks the debut of Norm, Dr. Doofenshmirtz's robot assistant who would become a supporting character later on in the show.

=== May ===
- May 4: Family Guy concludes its sixth season on Fox with the episode "Long John Peter". The episode was seen by just nearly 7.7 million viewers that night.
- May 11: The Simpsons episode "Mona Leaves-a" premieres on Fox, this episode marks the death of Homer's estranged yet loving mother Mona Simpson (though she would still be seen in later episodes during flashbacks and dream sequences). Famed cyclist Lance Armstrong guest stars as himself in this episode. The episode was seen by exactly 6.02 million viewers that night.
- May 15: During the Cannes Film Festival, Ari Folman's Waltz with Bashir premieres.
- May 18:
  - The Simpsons concludes its 19th season on Fox with the episode "All About Lisa", which guest stars Drew Carey. The episode was seen by just nearly 6.2 million viewers that night.
  - King of the Hill concludes its 12th season on Fox with the episode "Life: A Loser's Manual", which guest stars Johnny Knoxville as Peggy's brother/Luanne's father, Hoyt Platter. The episode was seen by exactly 5.4 million viewers that night.
  - American Dad! concludes its fourth season on Fox with the episode "Spring Breakup". The episode was seen by over 5.6 million viewers that night.

=== June ===
- June 5:
  - The Marvelous Misadventures of Flapjack premieres on Cartoon Network with the episodes "Several Leagues Under the Sea/Eye Sea You".
  - Total Drama Island makes its U.S. premiere on Cartoon Network.
- June 6:
  - Kung Fu Panda, directed by John Stevenson and Mark Osborne and produced by DreamWorks Animation, releases in theaters to universal acclaim by both fans & critics.
- June 20: Canadian animation and entertainment studio Cookie Jar Entertainment announces a merger with DIC Entertainment.
- June 27: Disney-Pixar's WALL-E releases in theaters to near-universal critical acclaim and was a box-office success.
- June 29: Ed, Edd n Eddy airs the only episode from its 6th season on Cartoon Network titled "May I Have This Ed?/Look Before You Ed". This was the final episode of the series to premiere, the TV movie Ed, Edd n Eddy's Big Picture Show would premiere the following year and serve as the series finale to the show.

=== July ===
- July 19:
  - Ponyo, directed by Hayao Miyazaki and produced by Studio Ghibli, premieres in Japan.
  - Avatar: The Last Airbender's series finale "Sozin's Comet" premieres on Nickelodeon.
- July 23: Cookie Jar's purchase and merger with DIC Entertainment is completed. DIC is later folded into Cookie Jar's operations.
- July 24: Chowder concludes its first season on Cartoon Network with the premiere of the half-hour special finale "The Apprentice Games".

=== August ===
- August 26: Walt Disney Studios Home Entertainment's The Little Mermaid: Ariel's Beginning is released. which marks the final direct-to-video sequel based a film from the Disney Animated Canon.
- August 28: The Animation Guild announces that Cartoon Network picked up Pendleton Ward's Adventure Time short from Frederator Studios and greenlit it for a full series.

=== September ===
- September 5: Season 2 of Upin & Ipin premiered on TV9.
- September 20: After 11 years, the Toonami block is officially cancelled by Cartoon Network.
- September 23: The Scooby-Doo direct-to-video halloween film Scooby-Doo! and the Goblin King releases on DVD.
- September 28:
  - Season 20 of The Simpsons begins on Fox with the premiere of the episode "Sex, Pies and Idiot Scrapes", which guest stars Julia Louis-Dreyfus, Robert Forster, and Joe Mantegna. The episode was seen by over 9.4 million viewers that night.
  - The 13th & final season (for its original run) of King of the Hill begins on Fox with the premiere of the episode "Dia-BILL-ic Shock", Jake Steinfeld guest stars as Bill's new friend Thunder. The episode was seen by exactly 7.1 million viewers that night.
  - Season 7 of Family Guy begins on Fox with the premiere of the episode "Love, Blactually". This episode reveals that Brian is an Atheist, but he wouldn't reveal it to the rest of the Griffins until in "Not All Dogs Go to Heaven". The episode was seen by just nearly 9.1 million viewers that night.
  - Season 5 of American Dad! begins on Fox with the premiere of the episode "1600 Candles". The episode was seen by just nearly 6.9 million viewers that night.

=== October ===
- October 2: Season 2 of Chowder begins on Cartoon Network with the premiere of the episode "The Arborians".
- October 5: The Family Guy episode "I Dream of Jesus" premieres on Fox. This episode marks the debut of Surfin' Bird being played in the show by Peter as a running gag. This episode features one of the biggest plot holes in the show, Brian having seen Jesus Christ in person and still going on to classify himself as an Atheist. The episode was seen by nearly 3.4 million viewers that night.
- October 11: "Clash of the Pharaohs", the series finale of Tutenstein is released.
- October 12: The standalone Grim Adventures of Billy & Mandy special "Underfist: Halloween Bash" premieres on Cartoon Network.
  - This special was initially planned by Maxwell Atoms to be the backdoor pilot for a new spin-off series, but it was canned after Atoms was fired from Cartoon Network Inc. due to them believing that he ruined their brand.

=== November ===
- November 7: Madagascar: Escape 2 Africa premieres in theaters and was a critical & box-office success.
- November 13: 3-2-1 Penguins! airs its final episode on Qubo.
- November 19: South Park concludes its 12th season on Comedy Central with the episode "The Ungroundable", this was the last episode to be produced and shown in 480i standard-definition. It was seen by just nearly 3.3 million viewers that night.
- November 21: The Walt Disney Company releases Bolt.
- November 27: The Foster's Home for Imaginary Friends television film "Destination: Imagination" premiered on Cartoon Network.
- November 28: The first episode of The Penguins of Madagascar airs on Nickelodeon as a sneak peek. The show would make its official premiere in March 2009.
- November 29: Total Drama Island airs its final episode on Teletoon, thus concluding the first season of the Total Drama series. The season later concluded in the US Cartoon Network on December 18th.

=== December ===
- December 9: André 3000, the creator of Class of 3000, was sued for numerous production problems as the cartoon was cancelled last December. It was the victim of Cartoon Network’s regime change that was responsible for the infamous Boston Bomb Scare, which was perpetrated by former Vice-president Jim Samples about two year earlier. The cartoon was withdrawn from subsequent broadcast owing to this issue.
- December 22: The first episode of The Garfield Show airs.
- December 30: Free Radicals is added to the National Film Registry.

== Awards ==
- Academy Award for Best Animated Feature: Ratatouille
- Academy Award for Best Animated Short: Peter & the Wolf
- Animation Kobe Feature Film Award: Evangelion: 1.0 You Are (Not) Alone
- Annecy International Animated Film Festival Cristal du long métrage: Sita Sings the Blues
- Annie Award for Best Animated Feature: Kung Fu Panda
- Asia Pacific Screen Award for Best Animated Feature Film: Waltz with Bashir
- BAFTA Award for Best Animated Film: WALL-E
- Goya Award for Best Animated Film: The Missing Lynx
- Japan Academy Prize for Animation of the Year: Ponyo
- Japan Media Arts Festival Animation Grand Prize: La Maison en Petits Cubes
- Mainichi Film Awards - Animation Grand Award: The Sky Crawlers

== Films released ==
- January 1 - Little Dodo (Germany)
- January 11 - The Pirates Who Don't Do Anything: A VeggieTales Movie (United States)
- January 15 - Dragonlance: Dragons of Autumn Twilight (United States)
- January 30 - Fly Me to the Moon (Belgium)
- January 31 - Gnomes and Trolls: The Secret Chamber (Sweden)
- February 5:
  - Turok: Son of Stone (United States)
  - The World Is Hot Enough (Canada)
- February 11 - Sita Sings the Blues (United States)
- February 26:
  - Barbie Mariposa (United States)
  - Bratz Kidz Fairy Tales (United States)
  - Justice League: The New Frontier (United States)
- March - The Toe Tactic (United States)
- March 1 - One Piece: Episode of Chopper Plus: Bloom in the Winter, Miracle Cherry Blossom (Japan)
- March 4:
  - Davie & Golimyr (United States)
  - Unstable Fables: 3 Pigs & a Baby (United States)
- March 8 - Doraemon: Nobita and the Legend of the Green Giant (Japan)
- March 11 - Imaginationland: The Movie (United States)
- March 14 - Horton Hears a Who! (United States)
- March 25 - Tripping the Rift: The Movie (Canada)
- March 26 - Dragon Hunters (France, Germany, and Luxembourg)
- March 27 - 31 minutos, la película (Chile, Brazil, and Spain)
- April 3 - Nak (Thailand)
- April 17:
  - A Fox's Tale (Hungary)
  - If You Were Me: Anima Vision 2 (South Korea)
- April 18 - Moomin and Midsummer Madness (Finland)
- April 19 - Detective Conan: Full Score of Fear (Japan)
- April 26 - Idiots and Angels (United States)
- May 1 - Impy's Wonderland (Germany)
- May 15 - From Inside (United States)
- May 16 - Animal Crisis (Spain)
- May 23 - Ghatothkach: Master of Magic (India)
- June 2 - Até ao Tecto do Mundo (Portugal)
- June 5 - Waltz with Bashir (Israel, Germany, and France)
- June 6 - Kung Fu Panda (United States)
- June 12 - Life is Cool (South Korea)
- June 13 - Dashavatar (India)
- June 18 - Urduja (Philippines)
- June 24 - Futurama: The Beast with a Billion Backs (United States)
- June 27 - WALL-E (United States)
- July 8 - Batman: Gotham Knight (United States and Japan)
- July 12:
  - Ghost in the Shell 2.0 (Japan)
  - Los Campeones de la Lucha Libre (United States)
- July 15 - VeggieTales: Tomato Sawyer and Huckleberry Larry's Big River Rescue (United States)
- July 18 - Space Chimps (United States, United Kingdom and Canada)
- July 19:
  - Pokémon: Giratina and the Sky Warrior (Japan)
  - Ponyo (Japan)
- August 2:
  - Naruto Shippuden The Movie: Bonds (Japan)
  - The Sky Crawlers (Japan)
- August 5:
  - Dead Fury (United States)
  - Garfield's Fun Fest (United States and South Korea)
- August 15 - Star Wars: The Clone Wars (United States)
- August 21 - John's Arm: Armageddon (United States)
- August 26 - The Little Mermaid: Ariel's Beginning (United States)
- August 30 - Kungfu Master aka Wong Fei Hong vs Kungfu Panda (China)
- September 2 - Next Avengers: Heroes of Tomorrow (United States)
- September 4:
  - $9.99 (Australia)
  - Edison and Leo (Canada)
- September 6 - Tengen Toppa Gurren Lagann: Gurren Chapter (Japan)
- September 7 - Barbie and the Diamond Castle (United States)
- September 9 - Unstable Fables: Tortoise vs. Hare (United States)
- September 12 - Spirit of the Forest (Spain)
- September 15 - Storm Rider Clash of the Evils (China)
- September 19:
  - Igor (United States)
  - Mamma Moo and the Crow (Sweden)
- September 22 - Bratz: Girlz Really Rock (United States)
- September 23 - Scooby-Doo! and the Goblin King (United States)
- September 24 - Open Season 2 (United States)
- September 26:
  - Flying Heroes (Spain)
  - Journey to Saturn (Denmark)
- October 4 - Fist of the North Star: The Legend of Kenshirô (Japan)
- October 10 - Sunshine Barry & The Disco Worms (Denmark and Germany)
- October 11 - Genius Party Beyond (Japan)
- October 16:
  - Goat Story – The Old Prague Legends (Czech Republic)
  - Moonbeam Bear and His Friends (Germany)
- October 17 - Resident Evil: Degeneration (United States and Japan)
- October 23 - Roadside Romeo (India)
- October 28:
  - Dead Space: Downfall (United States)
  - Tinker Bell (United States)
- October 30:
  - Immigrants (United States and Hungary)
  - Sing to the Dawn (Singapore)
- October 31 - Kurt Turns Evil (Norway)
- November 1 - The Flight Before Christmas (Finland, Denmark, Germany, and Ireland)
- November 4:
  - Barbie in a Christmas Carol (United States)
  - Futurama: Bender's Game (United States)
- November 5 - Bratz Babyz Save Christmas (United States)
- November 7:
  - Madagascar: Escape 2 Africa (United States)
  - Mocland - The Legend of the Aloma (Spain)
- November 8 - Yes! Precure 5 GoGo! Happy Birthday in the Land of Sweets (Japan)
- November 15 - Pattenrai!! ~ Minami no Shima no Mizu Monogatari (Japan)
- November 18 - The Little Panda Fighter (Brazil)
- November 21 - Bolt (United States)
- November 29 - The Adventures of Alyonushka and Yeryoma (Russia)
- December 10:
  - Little Spirit: Christmas in New York (United States)
  - Mia and the Migoo (France)
- December 12 - Delgo (United States)
- December 13:
  - Bleach: Fade to Black (Japan)
  - A Miser Brothers' Christmas (United States)
- December 14 - The Tale of Soldier Fedot, The Daring Fellow (Russia)
- December 16 - Unstable Fables: Goldilocks and the 3 Bears (United States)
- December 19 - The Tale of Despereaux (United States and United Kingdom)
- December 25:
  - Dayo: Sa Mundo ng Elementalia (Philippines)
  - The Missing Lynx (Spain)
  - Wanderer in the land of Elementalia (Philippines)
- December 26 - Spike (France)
- Specific date unknown:
  - The Enchanted Mountain (Italy)
  - Little Princess School (Brazil)
  - Tiny Robots (Brazil)
  - Winner and the Gold Child (Italy)
  - El Zorro Ladrón (Spain)

== Television series debuts ==
Date	Title	Channel	Year
January 5	Animalia	PBS Kids Go!	2008–2009
January 12	Betsy's Kindergarten Adventures	PBS Kids	2008
February 4	The Mr. Men Show	Cartoon Network	2008–2009
February 7	Ni Hao, Kai-Lan	Nick Jr.	2008–2011
March 8	The Spectacular Spider-Man	TheCW4Kids, Disney XD	2008–2009
March 15	World of Quest	Kids' WB	2008–2009
April 12	Pokémon: DP Battle Dimension	Cartoon Network	2008–2009
April 18	Ben 10: Alien Force	Cartoon Network	2008–2010
April 26	The Mighty B!	Nickelodeon	2008–2011
April 27	Speed Racer: The Next Generation	Nicktoons Network	2008–2013
June 5	The Marvelous Misadventures of Flapjack	Cartoon Network	2008–2010
June 5	Total Drama (Note: Initially premiered on Teletoon in Canada on July 8, 2007.)	Cartoon Network	2008–2014
June 21	Can You Teach My Alligator Manners?	Playhouse Disney	2008–2009
June 27	Three Delivery	Nicktoons Network	2008–2009
July 9	Click and Clack's As the Wrench Turns	PBS	2008
September 1	Martha Speaks	PBS Kids	2008–2014
September 1	Sid the Science Kid	PBS Kids	2008–2013
September 7	Wunderkind Little Amadeus	PBS Kids	2008–2009
September 28	The Life & Times of Tim	HBO	2008–2012
September 28	Superjail!	Adult Swim	2008–2014
October 3	The Secret Saturdays	Cartoon Network	2008–2010
October 3	Star Wars: The Clone Wars	Cartoon Network	2008–2014
October 4	Making Fiends	Nicktoons Network	2008
October 4	Turbo Dogs	Qubo	2008–2011
October 27	Cars Toons	Disney Channel	2008–2014
November 3	Sammy's Story Shop	Qubo	2008
November 8	Tasty Time with ZeFronk	Playhouse Disney	2008–2010
November 14	Batman: The Brave and the Bold	Cartoon Network	2008–2011
November 16	Toot & Puddle	Noggin	2008–2011
November 21	Spaceballs: The Animated Series	G4	2008–2009
November 23	The Drinky Crow Show	Adult Swim	2008–2009
November 28	The Penguins of Madagascar (Note: The show first aired as a sneak preview, it made its official premiere on March 28, 2009.)	Nickelodeon	2008–2015
December 6	Random! Cartoons	Nicktoons Network	2008–2009

== Television series endings ==
Date	Title	Channel	Year	Notes
January 7	Higglytown Heroes	Playhouse Disney	2004–2008	Ended
January 21	Codename: Kids Next Door	Cartoon Network	2002–2008	Ended
January 21	The Land Before Time	Cartoon Network	2007–2008	Ended
February 1	Pokémon: Diamond and Pearl	Cartoon Network	2007–2008	Ended
March 1	Johnny Test	Kids' WB	2005–2008	Cancelled, until revived by Cartoon Network in 2009.
March 8	The Batman	Kids' WB	2004–2008	Ended
March 15	Shaggy & Scooby-Doo Get a Clue!	Kids' WB	2006–2008	Ended
March 21	Wilbur	Discovery Kids	2007–2008	Ended
March 22	Tom and Jerry Tales	Kids' WB	2006–2008	Ended
March 23	Frisky Dingo	Adult Swim	2006–2008	Ended
March 27	Camp Lazlo	Cartoon Network	2005–2008	Ended
April 5	Legion of Super Heroes	Kids' WB	2006–2008	Ended
April 15	Ben 10 (2005)	Cartoon Network	2005–2008	Ended
May 15	Lil' Bush	Comedy Central	2007–2008	Cancelled
May 25	Class of 3000	Cartoon Network	2006–2008	Ended
May 31	Space Ghost Coast to Coast	GameTap	2006–2008	Ended
June 10	ToddWorld	Discovery Kids	2004–2008	Ended
June 18	The Zula Patrol	PBS Kids	2005–2008	Ended
June 21	Growing Up Creepie	Discovery Kids	2006–2008	Ended
July 1	Bigfoot Presents: Meteor and the Mighty Monster Trucks	Discovery Kids	2006–2008	Ended
July 5	The Future Is Wild	Discovery Kids	2007–2008	Ended
July 6	Assy McGee	Adult Swim	2006–2008	Cancelled
July 19	Avatar: The Last Airbender	Nickelodeon	2005–2008	Ended
August 13	Click and Clack's As the Wrench Turns	PBS	2008	Ended
August 17	All Grown Up!	Nickelodeon	2003–2008	Ended
August 17	Code Monkeys	G4	2007–2008	Ended
August 17	George of the Jungle	Cartoon Network	2007–2008	Ended
August 23	ChalkZone	Nickelodeon	2002–2008	Ended
August 31	Mama Mirabelle's Home Movies	PBS Kids	2007–2008	Ended
September 11	Strawberry Shortcake	Direct-to-Video	2003–2008	Ended
September 13	El Tigre: The Adventures of Manny Rivera	Nicktoons Network	2007–2008	Cancelled
September 20	Kappa Mikey	Nicktoons Network	2006–2008	Ended
September 27	Betsy's Kindergarten Adventures	PBS Kids	2008	Ended
October 11	Tutenstein	Discovery Kids	2003–2008	Ended
October 26	Happy Monster Band	Playhouse Disney	2007–2008	Cancelled
October 30	Edgar & Ellen	Nicktoons Network	2007–2008	Cancelled
November 1	Making Fiends	Nicktoons Network	2008	Cancelled
November 13	3-2-1 Penguins!	Qubo	2006–2008	Cancelled
November 20	The Emperor's New School	Disney Channel	2006–2008	Cancelled
November 27	My Gym Partner's a Monkey	Cartoon Network	2005–2008	Cancelled
November 30	Ribert and Robert's Wonderworld	PBS Kids	2005–2008	Ended
December 6	DinoSquad	CBS	2007–2008	Ended
December 6	Care Bears: Adventures in Care-a-lot	CBS	2007–2008	Ended
December 6	Horseland	CBS	2006–2008	Ended
December 18	Moral Orel	Adult Swim	2005–2008	Ended
December 19	Sammy's Story Shop	Qubo	2008	Cancelled

== Television season premieres ==
Date	Title	Season	Channel
January 20	Aqua Teen Hunger Force	5	Adult Swim
January 26	Mickey Mouse Clubhouse	2	Playhouse Disney (Disney Channel)
February 1	The Backyardigans	3	Nickelodeon
February 18	The Fairly OddParents	6	Nickelodeon
March 3	SpongeBob SquarePants	6	Nickelodeon
March 10	The Replacements	2	Disney Channel
March 12	South Park	12	Comedy Central
March 13	Foster's Home for Imaginary Friends	6	Cartoon Network
March 23	Futurama	5	Comedy Central
June 29	Ed, Edd n Eddy	6	Cartoon Network
September 15	Dora the Explorer	5	Nickelodeon
September 28	American Dad!	5	Fox
September 28	Family Guy	7	Fox
September 28	King of the Hill	13	Fox
September 28	The Simpsons	20	Fox
October 2	Chowder	2	Cartoon Network
October 4	My Life as a Teenage Robot	3	Nicktoons
October 10	Ben 10: Alien Force	2	Cartoon Network
December 7	Robot Chicken	4	Adult Swim

== Television season finales ==
Date	Title	Season	Channel
March 1	Johnny Test	3	Kids' WB (The CW)
March 6	Foster's Home for Imaginary Friends	5	Cartoon Network
March 23	Aqua Teen Hunger Force	5	Adult Swim
May 4	Family Guy	6	Fox
May 18	King of the Hill	12	Fox
May 18	American Dad!	4	Fox
May 18	The Simpsons	19	Fox
June 29	Ed, Edd n Eddy	6	Cartoon Network
July 24	Chowder	1	Cartoon Network
August 5	Dora the Explorer	4	Nickelodeon
August 31	Ben 10: Alien Force	1	Cartoon Network
October 5	Robot Chicken	3	Adult Swim
November 19	South Park	12	Comedy Central
November 29	Total Drama	1	Teletoon (Note: Season later concluded in the US on Cartoon Network on December 18th.)

== Births ==
=== March ===
- March 14: Abby Ryder Fortson, American actress (voice of Priscilla in Trolls: The Beat Goes On! and Trolls: TrollsTopia, Neeri in the Miles from Tomorrowland episode "Career Day", Tara in the T.O.T.S. episode "Stripe Out").

=== July ===
- July 15: Iain Armitage, American child actor (voice of young Shaggy Rogers in Scoob!, Chase in PAW Patrol: The Movie).

=== August ===
- August 1: Emma Berman, American actress (voice of Winifred Wings in Go! Go! Cory Carson, Giulia Marcovaldo in Luca, Ginny in SuperKitties, Nash Durango in Star Wars: Young Jedi Adventures, Squirrel Girl in Spidey and His Amazing Friends).

=== November ===
- November 2: Sunny Sandler, American child actress (voice of Summer in Leo).

=== December ===
- December 22: Madeleine McGraw, American child actress (voice of Rita and Patsie in Clarence, Maddy McGear in Cars 3, Bonnie Anderson in Toy Story 4, Young Katie in The Mitchells vs. the Machines).

== Deaths ==
=== January ===
- January 2:
  - Brice Mack, American film director and painter (Walt Disney Company), dies at age 90.
  - Joyce Carlson, American artist (Walt Disney Animation Studios), dies at age 84.
- January 17: Allen Melvin, American actor (voice of Magilla Gorilla), dies at age 84.
- January 18: Suzanne Pleshette, American actress (voice of Zira in The Lion King II: Simba's Pride, Yubaba and Zeniba in the English dub of Spirited Away), dies at age 70.

=== February ===
- February 2: Gus Arriola, Mexican-American comics artist and animator (Screen Gems, MGM), dies at age 90.
- February 6:
  - John Alvin, American cinematic artist and painter (The Walt Disney Company, Warner Bros. Feature Animation, Don Bluth Entertainment, Amblimation, Fox Animation Studios, The Plague Dogs, The Nutcracker Prince, Tom and Jerry: The Movie, Felidae, The Fearless Four, Pokémon: The First Movie, Pokémon The Movie 2000, The SpongeBob SquarePants Movie), dies at age 59.
  - Phyllis Barnhart, American animator (Walt Disney Company, Filmation, Hanna-Barbera, Bandolier Films, Chuck Jones Productions, Murakami-Wolf-Swenson, DePatie-Freleng, Don Bluth Productions) dies at age 85.
- February 10: Steve Gerber, American writer (Thundarr the Barbarian, Dungeons & Dragons, G.I. Joe: A Real American Hero, The Transformers, Superman: The Animated Series), dies at age 60.
- February 13: Kon Ichikawa, Japanese film director and animator (J.O. Studio), dies at age 92.

=== March ===
- March 3: Taichirō Hirokawa, Japanese actor, dies at age 68.
- March 4: Gary Gygax, American game designer and author (co-creator of Dungeons & Dragons, voiced himself in the Futurama episode "Anthology of Interest I"), dies from abdominal aortic aneurysm at age 69.
- March 8: Franco Paludetti, Italian animator and comic artist (worked for Gamma Films), dies at age 83.
- March 11: Dave Stevens, American illustrator and comics artist (Hanna-Barbera), dies at age 52.
- March 12: Iosif Boyarsky, Russian animator and animated film director (worked for Soyuzmultfilm), dies at age 90.
- March 18: Justin Wright, American animator (Pixar), dies from a heart attack at age 27.
- March 21: Raymond Leblanc, Belgian comics publisher, film producer (founder of Belvision) and film director (Tintin and the Lake of Sharks), dies at age 92.

=== April ===
- April 5: Charlton Heston, American actor (narrated Energy: A National Issue, Noel, Hercules, voice of Judah Ben-Hur in Ben-Hur), dies at age 84.
- April 11: Andy Knight, Canadian animator and film and television director (Ned's Newt, Get Ed), dies at age 46.
- April 14: Ollie Johnston, American animator (Walt Disney Animation Studios), dies at age 95.

=== May ===
- May 3: Ted Key, American animator/screenwriter (Peabody's Improbable History in Rocky & Bullwinkle) and comics artist, dies at age 95.
- May 11: Dick Sutcliffe, American animator (co-creator of Davey and Goliath), dies at age 90.
- May 13: Len Maxwell, American actor (voice of Karate in Batfink, the judge in Hugo the Hippo, Nick Diamond in Celebrity Deathmatch), dies at 77.
- May 16: David Mitton, English television and film director and producer, model maker and special effects technician (Thomas and Friends), dies at age 69.
- May 29: Harvey Korman, American actor and comedian (voice of the Great Gazoo in The Flintstones, Don Reynolds in Hey Arnold!, Arismap in the Hercules episode "Hercules and the Griffin", Efrem von Snickerdoodle in the 101 Dalmatians: The Series episode "Cupid Pup", O. Ratz in the What a Cartoon! episode "Rat in a Hot Tin Can", Gularis in the Buzz Lightyear of Star Command episode "Panic on Bathyos"), dies at age 81.

=== June ===
- June 8: Vladimiro Missaglia, Italian comics artist and animator, dies at age 75.
- June 12: Leah Ryan, American television writer (Arthur), dies at age 44.
- June 22:
  - Dody Goodman, American actress (voice of Miss Miller in Alvin and the Chipmunks), dies at age 93.
  - George Carlin, American actor, comedian, author and social critic (voice of Rufus in Bill & Ted's Excellent Adventures, the Narrator in Thomas & Friends, Zugor in Tarzan II, Fillmore in Cars, Wizard in Happily N'Ever After, Munchie in The Simpsons episode "D'oh-in' in the Wind"), dies from heart failure at age 71.

=== July ===
- July 3: Larry Harmon, American clown (played himself in Bozo: The World's Most Famous Clown, voice of Stan Laurel in Laurel and Hardy), dies at age 83.
- July 22:
  - Greg Burson, American actor (voice of Mr. DNA in Jurassic Park, voice replacement for all characters performed by Mel Blanc and Daws Butler), dies from complications of diabetes at age 59.
  - Estelle Getty, American actress and comedian (voice of Mrs. Hennypecker in The Sissy Duckling, Aunt Jane in the Duckman episode "Westward, No!"), dies from lewy body dementia at age 84.
  - Dylan Beach, American former child actor (voice of Charlie Brown in It's Arbor Day, Charlie Brown), dies from pulmonary hypertension at age 43.
- July 25:
  - Bruce Adler, American actor and singer (singing voice of the Peddler in Aladdin and Aladdin and the King of Thieves), dies at age 63.
  - Randy Pausch, American educator known for his VR contributions as a Disney Imagineer, dies from cancer at 47.

=== August ===
- August 5: Gary Mooney, Canadian-American animator (Walt Disney Company, Hubley Studios, Gene Deitch, Jay Ward Productions, animated sequence in Jurassic Park), dies from cancer at age 78.
- August 7: Bernie Brillstein, American film producer and talent agent (The Real Ghostbusters, ALF: The Animated Series, ALF Tales, Space Cats), dies from chronic obstructive pulmonary disease at age 77.
- August 9: Bernie Mac, American actor and comedian (voice of Fruit Juice in Lil' Pimp, Gadgetmobile in Inspector Gadget's Biggest Caper Ever, Zuba in Madagascar: Escape 2 Africa, Mack in the King of the Hill episode "Racist Dawg"), dies from pneumonia at age 50.
- August 10:
  - Terence Rigby, English actor (voice of Silver in Watership Down), dies at age 71.
  - Isaac Hayes, American singer and actor (voice of Chef in South Park), dies at age 65.
- August 15: Carlos Meglia, Argentine animator and comics artist (Hanna-Barbera), dies at age 50.
- August 16: Jack Dunham, American animator and television producer (Walt Disney Animation Studios, Walter Lantz Productions), dies at age 97.

=== September ===
- September 1: Don LaFontaine, American voice actor (voice of the Narrator in Santa vs. the Snowman 3D, the Announcer in Fillmore!, FOX Announcer and Narrator in the Family Guy episodes "Screwed the Pooch" and "Brian Sings and Swings", Movie Trailer Announcer in the American Dad! episode "Tearjerker", Movie VO Voice in the Phineas and Ferb episode "The Chronicles of Meap"), dies from complications from a pneumothorax at age 68.
- September 2: Bill Melendez, American animator (Walt Disney Company, Warner Bros. Cartoons, UPA), film director (Peanuts) and actor (voice of Snoopy and Woodstock), dies at age 91.
- September 26:
  - Paul Newman, American actor, film director, race car driver and entrepreneur (voice of Doc Hudson in Cars and Cars 3, himself in The Simpsons episode "The Blunder Years"), dies from lung cancer at age 83.
  - Walter Bien, American film producer (Tom and Jerry, Rod Rocket), dies at age 85.

=== October ===
- October 17: Levi Stubbs, American baritone singer (voice of Mother Brain in Captain N: The Game Master), dies at age 72.
- October 27: Ray Ellis, American record producer, arranger, conductor and composer (Filmation, Spider-Man, Eight Crazy Nights), dies from melanoma at age 85.

=== December ===
- December 8: Oliver Postgate, English animator, puppeteer and TV writer (narrator and additional voices in Ivor the Engine and Noggin the Nog, co-creator of Bagpuss), co-founder of Smallfilms, dies at age 83.
- December 11: Madeleine Blaustein, American voice actress and comic book writer (voice of Meowth in seasons 1-8 of Pokémon, Dr. K and Mayor of Bubble Town in Cubix: Robots for Everyone, Solomon Muto and Zygor in Yu-Gi-Oh!, Oslo, Burnt Meatballs, Chef, Audience and King Hungry the Ate in Fighting Foodons, Chef Kawasaki, Waddle Doo, Professor Curio, Tuggle, Gengu, Melman and Biblio in Kirby: Right Back at Ya!, Wally Tusket, Comrade Turbinski and Lord Flash in Ultimate Muscle: The Kinnikuman Legacy, Principal, Police Officer and Chief of Police in Sonic X, Migeira in Samurai Deeper Kyo, Dr. Kureha in the 4Kids dub of One Piece, Overkill in G.I. Joe: Sigma 6, Topher, Sartorius Kumar and Professor in Yu-Gi-Oh! GX, Helga in season 1 of Dinosaur King, Shoe the Shoebill in Impy's Island and Impy's Wonderland, Grizzlepuss in The Little Panda Fighter, Rassimov in Huntik: Secrets & Seekers), dies at age 48.
- December 18: Majel Barrett, American actress (voice of Christine Chapel and Lt. M'Ress in Star Trek: The Animated Series, Anna Watson in Spider-Man), dies at age 76.
- December 25: Eartha Kitt, American singer, actress, comedian, dancer and activist (voice of Yzma in The Emperor's New Groove franchise, Queen Vexus in My Life as a Teenage Robot, Fortune Teller in the American Dad! episode "Dope and Faith", Cool Cat in the Wonder Pets! episode "Save the Cool Cat and the Hip Hippo!", Mrs. Franklin in The Magic School Bus episode "Going Batty", Lioness #1 in The Wild Thornberrys episode "Flood Warning", the Snow Queen in Happily Ever After: Fairy Tales for Every Child episode "The Snow Queen", herself in The Simpsons episode "Once Upon a Time in Springfield"), dies from colon cancer at age 81.

== See also ==
- 2008 in anime
