= 2008 in anime =

Events in 2008 in anime.

== Events ==
In this year, 288 anime television programs were produced and home video sales of anime DVDs, Blu-ray Discs and HD DVDs in Japan were worth 77.9 billion yen. Animation studio 8-Bit was founded in September.

== Accolades ==
At the Mainichi Film Awards, The Sky Crawlers won the Animation Film Award and Ponyo won the Ōfuji Noburō Award. Ponyo also won the Japan Academy Prize for Animation of the Year; the other nominees were Doraemon: Nobita and the Green Giant Legend 2008, The Sky Crawlers, Detective Conan: Full Score of Fear and One Piece - The Movie: Episode of Chopper Plus: Bloom in the Winter, Miracle Sakura. Internationally, La Maison en Petits Cubes won the Academy Award for Best Animated Short Film and Le Cristal d'Annecy at the Annecy International Animated Film Festival. Sword of the Stranger was nominated for the Asia Pacific Screen Award for Best Animated Feature Film. Ponyo and The Sky Crawlers were in competition for the Golden Lion at the 65th Venice International Film Festival.

== Releases ==
=== Films ===
A list of anime that debuted in theaters between January 1 and December 31, 2008.

Release date	Title	Studio	Director	Running time (minutes)	Alternate title	Ref
February 9	The Garden of Sinners: Remaining Sense of Pain	ufotable	Mitsuru Obunai	59	Gekijō-ban sora no kyōkai the Garden of sinners daisanshō "tsūkaku zanryū"	
March 1	Keroro Gunso the Super Movie 3: Keroro vs. Keroro Great Sky Duel	Toei Animation	Junichi Satō (chief); Susumu Yamaguchi	113	Chō gekijō-ban keroro gunsō 3 keroro tai keroro tenkū daisakusen de arimasu!	
March 1	One Piece: Episode of Chopper Plus - Bloom in the Winter, Miracle Sakura	Sunrise	Junji Shimizu	95	Wan pīsu episōdo obu choppā + fuyu ni saku, kiseki no sakura	
April 19	Crayon Shin-chan: The Storm Called: The Hero of Kinpoko	Shin-Ei Animation	Mitsuru Hongo	93	Kureyon shin-chan cho ~ arashi o yobu kinpoko no yūsha	
April 19	Detective Conan: Full Score of Fear	TMS Entertainment	Yasuichiro Yamamoto	116	Meitantei konan senritsu no furu sukoa	
May 24	The Garden of Sinners: The Hollow Shrine	ufotable	Teiichi Takiguchi	46	Gekijō-ban sora no kyōkai the Garden of sinners daiyonshō "garan no hora"	
May 31	Himitsukessha Taka no Tsume: Watashi wo Aishita Kuro Oolong-Cha	DLE	FROGMAN	90	Himitsukessha taka no tsume THE mūbī II watashi o aishita kuro ūroncha	
July 19	Pokémon: Giratina and the Sky Warrior	OLM	Kunihiko Yuyama	96	Poketto monsutā daiyamondo & pāru giratina to hisora no hanataba sheimi	
July 19	Ponyo	Studio Ghibli	Hayao Miyazaki	100	Gake no ue no ponyo	
August 2	Naruto Shippuden: Bonds	Pierrot	Hajime Kamegaki	92	Gekijō-ban naruto - naruto - shippuden kizuna	
August 2	The Sky Crawlers	Production I.G	Mamoru Oshii	122	Sukai kurora	
August 16	The Garden of Sinners: Paradox Spiral	ufotable	Takayuki Hirao	114	Gekijō-ban sora no ryōiki the Garden of sinners daigoshō `mujun no rasen'	
September 6	Gurren Lagann: Childhood's End	Gainax	Hiroyuki Imaishi	112	Gekijō-ban tengan toppa gurenragan guren-hen	
October 11	Fist of the North Star: Legend of Kenshiro	TMS Entertainment	Toshiki Hirano	90	Ma kyūseishu densetsu hokuto no kobushi zero Kenshirō Den	
October 11	Genius Party Beyond	Studio 4°C	Mahiro Maeda; Kazuto Nakazawa; Shinya Ōhira; Tatsuyuki Tanaka; Kōji Morimoto	85	Jīniasu pātī biyondo	
October 18	Biohazard: Degeneration	Digital Frontier	Makoto Kamiya	96	Baiohazādo dijenerēshon	
October 18	Hells	Madhouse	Yoshiki Yamakawa	117	Heruzu, (heruzu enjerusu)	
November 8	Yes! Precure 5 GoGo! Movie: Okashi no Kuni no Happy Birthday	Toei Animation	Tatsuya Nagamine	75	Eiga iesu! Purikyua 5 GoGo! Okashinokuni no happī bāsudei	
November 29	Ice	PPM		103	Aisu gekijō-ban	
December 13	Bleach: Fade to Black	Pierrot	Noriyuki Abe	94	Gekijō-ban burīchi Fade to Black kimi no na wo yobu	
December 13	Major: Yuujou no Winning Shot	Xebec	Takao Kato	103	Gekijō-ban mejā yūjō no ichi-kyū (uiningu shotto)	
December 20	The Garden of Sinners: Oblivion Recording	ufotable	Takahiro Miura	59	Gekijō-ban sora no kyōkai the Garden of sinners dairokushō "bōkyaku rokuon"	

=== Television series ===
A list of anime television series that debuted between January 1 and December 31, 2008.

First run start and end dates	Title	Episodes	Studio	Director	Alternate title	Ref
January 2 – March 26	Sisters of Wellber Zwei	13	Trans Arts	Takayuki Hamana	Uerubēru no monogatari ~ shisutāzu of Wellber ~ dainimaku	
January 3 – March 27	Rosario + Vampire	13	Gonzo	Takayuki Inagaki	Rozario to banpaia	
January 4 – March 21	H2O: Footprints in the Sand	12	Zexcs	Hideki Tachibana	H 2 O ~ suna no ue no ashiato ~	
January 5 – March 8	Hatenkō Yūgi	10	Studio Deen	Yoshihiro Takamoto	Hatenkō yugi	
January 5 – June 28	Major S4	26	SynergySP	Riki Fukushima	Mejā (dai 4 shirīzu)	
January 5 – June 28	Persona: Trinity Soul	26	A-1 Pictures	Jun Matsumoto	Perusona 〜 toriniti Sōru 〜	
January 6 – March 23	Shigofumi: Letters from the Departed	12	J.C.Staff	Tatsuo Satō	Shigofumi	
January 6 – March 30	They Are My Noble Masters	13	A.C.G.T	Susumu Kudo	Kimi ga aruji de shitsuji ga ore de	
January 6 – March 30	True Tears	13	P.A.Works	Junji Nishimura	Hontō no namida	
January 6 – March 30	(Zoku) Sayonara, Zetsubou-Sensei	13	Shaft	Akiyuki Shinbo	Zoku sayonara zetsubō-sensei	
January 6 – December 28	Porphy no Nagai Tabi	52	Nippon Animation	Tomomi Mochizuki	Porufi no nagai tabi	
January 7 – March 31	Minami-ke: Okawari	13	Asread	Naoto Hosoda	Minami ke ~ o kawari ~	
January 8 – April 1	Aria the Origination	13	Hal Film Maker	Junichi Sato	Aria ji orijinēshon	
January 8 – April 1	Gunslinger Girl: Il Teatrino	13	Artland	Hiroshi Ishidori	Gan suringā gāru - IL TEATRINO -	
January 9 – March 26	Noramimi	12	TMS Entertainment	Yoshitaka Koyama	Noramimi	
January 9 – March 26	Spice and Wolf	13	Imagin	Takeo Takahashi	Ōkami to kōshinryō	
January 11 – March 21	Kitarō of the Graveyard	11	Toei Animation	Kimitoshi Chioki	Hakaba kitarō	
January 14 – March 3	Moegaku★5	40	AIC Spirits	Yoshihiro Takamoto	Mo egaku ★ 5	
January 14 – September 27, 2009	Yatterman	60	Tatsunoko Production	Hiroshi Sasagawa	Yattāman	
February 3 – January 25, 2009	Yes PreCure 5 GoGo!	48	Toei Animation	Toshiaki Komura	Iesu! Purikyua 5 GoGo!	
February 4 – July 7	Mnemosyne	6	Xebec	Shigeru Ueda	Munemoshune - munemoshune no musume tachi -	
March 15 – March 29	Bus Gamer	3	Studio Izena	Naoyuki Kazuya	Basu gēmā	
March 31 – September 25	Chi's Sweet Home	104	Madhouse	Mitsuyuki Masuhara	Chīzu suīto hōmu	
April 1 – September 30	Sugarbunnies: Chocolat!	26	Asahi Production	Hiroshi Kugimiya	Shugābanīzu shokora!	
April 2 – March 30, 2011	Yu-Gi-Oh! 5D's	154	Gallop	Katsumi Ono	Yū ☆ gi☆ Ō faibu dīzu	
April 3 – October 2	Allison & Lillia	26	Madhouse	Masayoshi Nishida	Arison to riria	
April 3 – February 19, 2009	Kyo Kara Maoh! (season 3)	39	Studio Deen	Junji Nishimura	Kyō kara maō! Dai 3 shirīzu	
April 4 – June 20	Kure-nai	12	Brain's Base	Kō Matsuo	Aka	
April 4 – June 27	xxxHolic: Kei	13	Production I.G	Tsutomu Mizushima	×××HOLiC ◆ Tsugi	
April 4 – September 26	Macross Frontier	25	Satelight	Shōji Kawamori (chief); Yasuhito Kikuchi	Makurosu efu (furontia)	
April 4 – September 26	To Love-Ru	26	Xebec	Takao Kato	To LOVEru - tora buru -	
April 5 – June 21	Kanokon	12	Xebec	Atsushi Ōtsuki	Kanokon	
April 5 – June 21	The Tower of Druaga: The Aegis of Uruk	12	Gonzo	Koichi Chigira	Doruāga no tō 〜 the Aegis of URUK 〜	
April 5 – June 28	Amatsuki	13	Studio Deen	Kazuhiro Furuhashi	Ama-tsuki	
April 5 – September 25	Itazura na Kiss	25	TMS Entertainment	Osamu Yamazaki	Itazurana Kiss	
April 5 – March 20, 2009	Penguin no Mondai	100	Shogakukan Music & Digital Entertainment	Jun Kamiya	Pengin no mondai	
April 5 – March 28, 2009	Blue Dragon: Trials of the Seven Shadows	51	Studio Pierrot	Yukihiro Matsushita	Burū doragon tenkai no shichiryū	
April 5 – March 27, 2010	Duel Masters Cross	100	Shogakukan Music & Digital Entertainment	Waruo Suzuki	Deyueru masutāzu kurosu	
April 6 – June 22	Kamen no Maid Guy	12	Madhouse	Masayuki Sakoi	Kamen no meido gai	
April 6 – June 29	Da Capo II: Second Season	13	Feel	Hideki Okamoto	D. C. II S. S. ~ Da kāpo II sekando shīzun ~	
April 6 – September 28	Blassreiter	24	Gonzo	Ichirō Itano	Burasureitā	
April 6 – September 28	Code Geass: Lelouch of the Rebellion R2	25	Sunrise	Gorō Taniguchi	Kōdo giasu hangyaku no rurūshu zokuhen	
April 6 – March 29, 2009	Net Ghost PiPoPa	51	Studio Hibari	Shinichiro Kimura	Netto gōsuto pipopa	
April 6 – March 29, 2009	Onegai My Melody Kirara☆	52	Studio Comet	Makoto Moriwaki	Onegai ♪ maimerodi kirara ~tsu★	
April 6 – March 29, 2009	Zettai Karen Children	51	SynergySP	Keiichiro Kawaguchi	Zettai karen chirudoren	
April 7 – June 30	Neo Angelique Abyss	13	Yumeta Company	Shin Katagai	Neo anjerīku Abyss	
April 7 – September 15	Our Home's Fox Deity.	24	Zexcs	Yoshiaki Iwasaki	Wagaya nō inari-sama.	
April 7 – September 15	Special A	24	AIC; Gonzo	Yoshikazu Miyao	Supesharu ē	
April 7 – September 29	Nabari no Ou	26	J.C.Staff	Kunihisa Sugishima	Nabari no ō	
April 7 – March 30, 2009	Soul Eater	51	Bones	Takuya Igarashi	Souru ītā	
April 7 – March 29, 2010	Hakken Taiken Daisuki! Shimajirō	101	Pierrot Plus; Studio Kikan	Akira Shigino; Masahiro Nakata	Hakkentai ken daisuki! Shimajirō	
April 8 – July 1	Vampire Knight	13	Studio Deen	Kiyoko Sayama	Vuanpaia naito	
April 8 – September 30	Monochrome Factor	24	A.C.G.T	Yuu Kou	Monokurōmu fakutā	
April 9 – June 25	Glass Maiden	12	Studio Fantasia	Mitsuko Kase	Kurisutaru bureizu	
April 9 – October 1	Real Drive	26	Production I.G	Kazuhiro Furuhashi	RD sen'nō chōsashitsu	
April 9 – October 1	Top Secret: The Revelation	26	Madhouse	Hiroshi Aoyama	Himitsu (toppu shīkuretto) The Revelation	
April 11 – June 27	Junjo Romantica	12	Studio Deen	Chiaki Kon	Junjō romanchika	
April 11 – June 27	Library War	12	Production I.G	Takayuki Hamana	Toshokan sensō	
April 11 – July 25	Kaiba	12	Madhouse	Masaaki Yuasa	Kaiba	
April 12 – October 4	The Diary of a Crazed Family	26	Nomad	Yasuhiro Kuroda	Kureijīna kazoku no nikki	
April 12 – March 28, 2009	Golgo 13	50	The Answer Studio	Shunji Oga	Gorugo 13	
April 13 – May 3	Legend of the Condor Hero III	26	Nippon Animation		Kondoru hideo densetsu III jū roku-nen no kyōtei	
April 13 – September 28	The Daughter of 20 Faces	22	Bones; Telecom Animation Film	Nobuo Tomizawa	Nijū mensō no musume	
June 2 – November 24	RoboDz Kazagumo Hen	26	Toei Animation	Daisuke Nishio	Robo dīzu - RoboDz - kaze to kumo no shō	
June 11 – August 27	Ikki Tousen: Great Guardians	12	Arms	Koichi Ohata	Ikkitōsen: Gurēto Guardians	
June 21 – December 20	Telepathy Shōjo Ran	26	TMS Entertainment	Masaharu Okuwaki	Terepashī shōjo ran	
July 1 – September 16	Ultraviolet: Code 044	12	Madhouse	Osamu Dezaki	Urutoravuaioretto kōdo 044	
July 2 – September 17	Sekirei	12	Seven Arcs	Keizō Kusakawa	Sekirei	
July 3 – September 25	Slayers Revolution	13	J.C.Staff	Takashi Watanabe	Sureiyāzu	
July 3 – September 25	Someday's Dreamers: Summer Skies	12	Hal Film Maker	Osamu Kobayashi	Mahōtsukai ni taisetsu nakoto ~ natsu no Sora ~	
July 4 – September 19	Antique Bakery	12	Nippon Animation; Shirogumi	Yoshiaki Okumura	Seiyō kottō yōgashi-ten ~ antīku ~	
July 4 – September 19	Strike Witches	12	Gonzo	Kazuhiro Takamura	Sutoraikuu~itchīzu	
July 4 – September 26	Hidamari Sketch × 365	13	Shaft	Akiyuki Shinbo	Hida mari suketchi × 365	
July 5 – September 27	Birdy the Mighty: Decode	13	A-1 Pictures	Kazuki Akane	Tetsuwan bādī (2008)	
July 6 – September 28	Yakushiji Ryōko no Kaiki Jikenbo	13	Doga Kobo	Tarō Iwasaki	Yakushiji ryōko no kaiki jikenbo	
July 7 – September 22	The Familiar of Zero: Rondo of Princesses	12	J.C.Staff	Yū Kō	Zero no tsukaima ~ san biki no rinbu ~	
July 7 – September 29	Neo Angelique Abyss: Second Age	13	Yumeta Company	Shin Katagai	Neo anjerīku Abyss - Second Age -	
July 8 – September 23	Mission-E	12	Studio Deen	Ichiro Sakaki; Jukki Hanada; Junji Nishimura; Takuya Satō; Toshifumi Kawase; Toshiyuki Kato	Misshon E	
July 8 – September 30	Natsume's Book of Friends	13	Brain's Base	Takahiro Omori	Natsume yūjinchō	
July 8 – September 30	World Destruction	13	Production I.G	Shunsuke Tada	Wārudo desutorakushon ~ sekai bokumetsu no rokunin ~	
July 9 – September 24	Koihime Musō	12	Doga Kobo	Nobuaki Nakanishi	Kohime† musō	
July 11 – September 26	Haruka Nogizaka's Secret	12	Diomedéa	Munenori Nawa	Nogizaka Haruka no himitsu	
July 14 – December 29	Blade of the Immortal	13	Bee Train	Kōichi Mashimo	Mugen no jūnin	
September 7 – September 6	Battle Spirits: Shounen Toppa Bashin	50	Sunrise	Mitsuru Hongo	Batoru supirittsu shōnen toppa bashin	
September 13 – September 14	Mach Girl	26	Tatsunoko Production	Masatsugu Arakawa	Mahha gāru	
September 29 – December 24	The Earl and the Fairy	12	Artland	Kōichirō Sōtome	Hakushaku to yōsei	
October 2 – December 25	Hyakko	13	Nippon Animation	Michio Fukuda	Hyakko	
October 2 – December 25	Rosario + Vampire Capu2	13	Gonzo	Takayuki Inagaki	Rozario to banpaia Capu 2	
October 2 – December 25	Shikabane Hime: Aka	13	Feel; Gainax	Masahiko Murata	Shitai kare	
October 2 – March 16, 2009	Casshern Sins	24	Madhouse; Tatsunoko Production	Shigeyasu Yamauchi	Kyashān SINS	
October 2 – March 26, 2009	Toradora!	25	J.C.Staff	Tatsuyuki Nagai	Tora dora!	
October 3 – December 19	Akaneiro ni Somaru Saka	12	TNK	Keitaro Motonaga	Akaneiro ni somaru saka	
October 3 – December 19	Yozakura Quartet	12	Nomad	Kou Matsuo	Yozakura shijūsō ~ yozakura karutetto ~	
October 3 – December 26	Legends of the Dark King: A Fist of the North Star Story	13	Satelight	Masashi Abe	Hokuto no kobushi Raō gaiden ten no haō	
October 3 – March 20, 2009	Linebarrels of Iron	24	Gonzo	Masamitsu Hidaka	Kurogane no rainbareru	
October 3 – March 27, 2009	Black Butler	24	A-1 Pictures	Toshiya Shinohara	Kuro shitsuji	
October 3 – March 27, 2009	Clannad After Story	24	Kyoto Animation	Tatsuya Ishihara	Kuranado 〜 AFTER sutōrī 〜	
October 3 – March 27, 2009	Tales of the Abyss	26	Sunrise	Kenji Kodama	Teiruzu obu ji abisu	
October 3 – March 28, 2009	Astro Fighter Sunred	26	AIC ASTA	Seiji Kishi	Tentai senshi Sanreddo	
October 4 – December 27	Kannagi	13	A-1 Pictures	Yutaka Yamamoto	Kan nagi	
October 4 – April 4, 2009	Hell Girl: Three Vessels	26	Studio Deen	Hiroshi Watanabe	Djigoku shōjo santei	
October 4 – September 25, 2009	Shugo Chara!! Doki—	51	Satelight	Kenji Yasuda	Shugokyara! !Do ki~tsu	
October 5 – December 21	Kemeko Deluxe!	12	Hal Film Maker	Tsutomu Mizushima	Kemeko derakkusu!	
October 5 – March 19, 2009	A Certain Magical Index	24	J.C.Staff	Hiroshi Nishikiori	Toaru majutsu no kinsho mokuroku	
October 5 – March 29, 2009	Mobile Suit Gundam 00 (season 2)	25	Sunrise	Seiji Mizushima	Kidō senshi Gandamu 00 sekando shīzun	
October 5 – September 27, 2009	Live On Cardliver Kakeru	51	TMS Entertainment	Hatsuki Tsuji	Raibuon CARDLIVER Shō	
October 5 – April 27, 2011	Inazuma Eleven	127	OLM	Katsuhito Akiyama (chief); Yoshikazu Miyao	Inazuma irebun	
October 6 – December 22	Ga-Rei: Zero	12	AIC Spirits; Asread	Ei Aoki	Garei: Zero	
October 6 – December 22	Macademi Wasshoi!	12	Zexcs	Takaomi Kanzaki	Ma ka de mi WAsshoi!	
October 6 – December 29	Kyō no Go no Ni	13	Xebec	Tsuyoshi Nagasawa	Kyō no go no ni	
October 6 – March 30, 2009	Skip Beat!	25	HAL Film Maker	Kiyoko Sayama	Sukippu bīto!	
October 7 – December 23	Ef: A Tale of Melodies	12	Shaft	Shin Ōnuma	Ef - merodī no monogatari.	
October 7 – December 23	Kurozuka	12	Madhouse	Tetsurō Araki	Kurotsuka	
October 7 – December 30	Vampire Knight Guilty	13	Studio Deen	Kiyoko Sayama	Vuanpaia naito giruti	
October 8 – December 31	Mōryō no Hako	13	Madhouse	Ryosuke Nakamura	Mōryō no hako	
October 8 – March 25, 2009	Stitch!	25	Madhouse	Masami Hata	Sutitchi!	
October 8 – April 1, 2009	One Outs	25	Madhouse	Yuzo Sato	Wan'nautsu	
October 9 – December 25	Chaos;Head	12	Madhouse	Takaaki Ishiyama	Kaosu heddo	
October 9 – March 26, 2009	Tytania	26	Artland	Noboru Ishiguro	Taitania	
October 10 – December 19	Nodame Cantabile: Paris-Hen	11	J.C.Staff	Chiaki Kon	No dame kantābire Pari-hen	
October 12 – December 28	Junjo Romantica (season 2)	12	Studio Deen	Chiaki Kon	Junjō romanchika 2 (ni)	
October 16 – March 19, 2009	Michiko & Hatchin	22	Manglobe	Sayo Yamamoto	Michiko to hatchin	

=== Original net animations ===
A list of original net animations that debuted between January 1 and December 31, 2008.

First run start and end dates	Title	Episodes	Studio	Director	Alternate title	Ref
March 24 – September 1	Ikuze! Gen-san	24	Nippon Animation	Yoshiaki Okumura	Iku ze ~tsu! Minamoto-san	
April 3	Yurumi to Shimeru	1	Opera House		Yurumi to shimeru	
April 19 – November 14	Penguin Musume♥Heart	22	Picture Magic	Hitoyuki Matsui	Pengin musume ♥ ha~a to	
April 25 – July 3	Hennako-chan	6	Gonzo		Hen'nako-chan	
May 2 – May 8, 2009	Candy Boy	7	AIC	Takafumi Hoshikawa	Candyboy ~ to aru futago shimai no nanigenai nichijō-banashi ~	
July 15 – February 4, 2009	Xam'd: Lost Memories	26	Bones	Masayuki Miyaji	Bōnen' no zamudo	
August 1 – September 18, 2009	Time of Eve	6	Studio Rikka	Yasuhiro Yoshiura	Ivu no jikan	

=== Original video animations ===
A list of original video animations that debuted between January 1 and December 31, 2008.

First run start and end dates	Title	Episodes	Studio	Director	Alternate title	Ref
January 17	School Days: Valentine Days	1	TNK	Keitaro Motonaga	School Days 「Valentine Days」	
February 21 – November 21	My-Otome 0: S.ifr	3	Sunrise	Hirokazu Hisayuki	Dance - YiHiME 0 ~ S. Ifr ~	
February 22	Code Geass: Hangyaku no Lelouch Special Edition - Black Rebellion	1	Sunrise	Goro Taniguchi	Kōdo giasu hangyaku no rurūshu SPECIAL EDITION burakku REBELLION	
February 28	The iDOLM@STER Live For You!	1	Actas	Keiichiro Kawaguchi	Aidorumasutā raibu fō yū!	
February 29 – March 28	Yotsunoha	2	Hal Film Maker	Hiroshi Nishikiori	Yotsunoha	
March 7 – August 1	Saint Seiya: The Hades Chapter - Elysion	6	Toei Animation	Tomoharu Katsumata	Seitōshi seiya meiō hādesu erishion-hen	
March 21	Kite Liberator	1	Arms	Yasuomi Umetsu	Kaito ribereitā	
March 26	Fist of the North Star: The Legend of Toki	1	APPP	Kobun Shizuno	Ma kyūseishu densetsu hokuto no kobushi toki-den	
March 26	Saishuu Shiken Kujira Progressive	1	Zexcs	Nagisa Miyazaki	Saishū shiken kujira Progressive	
March 26	School Days: Magical Heart Kokoro-chan	1	TNK	Keitaro Motonaga	Sukūru deizu ~ majikaru hāto ☆ kokoro-chan ~	
March 26 – August 8	To Heart 2 AD	2	Chaos Project	Yasuhisa Katō	To~uhāto 2	
April 1 – September 26	Amuri in Star Ocean	3	Studio Hibari	Yoshitomo Yonetani	Hoshi no umi no amuri	
April 2	Green vs. Red	1	TMS Entertainment	Shigeyuki Miya	Rupan sansei GREEN vs RED	
April 19	Detective Conan: Kudou Shinichi - The Case of the Mysterious Wall and the Black Lab	1	TMS Entertainment	Yasuichiro Yamamoto	Meitantei konan Magic File 2 ~ kudō shin'ichi nazo no kabe to kuroirabu jiken ~	
April 25 – June 27	Naisho no Tsubomi	3	Studio Kikan	Akira Shigino	Naisho no tsubomi	
April 25 – January 23, 2009	The Prince of Tennis: The National Tournament Finals	7	M.S.C	Shunsuke Tada	Tenisu no ōjisama Original vu~ideo Animation zenkoku taikai-hen Final	
July 8	Batman: Gotham Knight	6	Bee Train; Madhouse; Production I.G; Studio 4°C	Futoshi Higashide; Hiroshi Morioka; Jong-Sik Nam; Shōjirō Nishimi; Toshiyuki Kubooka; Yasuhiro Aoki; Yoshiaki Kawajiri (uncredited)	Battoman gossamu naito	
July 11	Kodomo no Jikan Recap	1	Diomedéa	Eiji Suganuma	Kodomo no jikan	
July 17 – September 17	School Rumble 3rd Semester	2	Studio Comet	Shinji Takamatsu	Sukūru ranburu san gakki	
July 30	Ranma ½: Nightmare! Incense of Spring Sleep	1	Studio Deen	Takeshi Mori	Ran ma 1/ 2 akumu! Shunmin ka	
August 8 – October 2	Kaitō Tenshi Twin Angel	2	Nomad	Tatsuyuki Nagai	Kaitō tenshi tsuin' enjeru	
August 8 – October 28	Detroit Metal City	12	Studio 4°C	Hiroshi Nagahama	Detoroito metaru shiti	
August 12 – February 17, 2009	Magical Teacher Negima! ~The White Wing~	3	Shaft; Studio Pastoral	Akiyuki Simbo; Hiroaki Tomita; Yukihiro Miyamoto	Mahō sensei negima ~ shiroki tsubasa ALA ALBA ~	
August 13	Candy Boy Episode: EX01 - Mirai Yohouzu	1	AIC	Takafumi Hoshikawa	Kyandī boy episode: EX 01 `mirai yosouzu'	
	Renketsu Houshiki					
	Ai no Katachi: Ecchi na Onnanoko wa Kirai... desu ka?					
	Alignment You! You! The Animation					
	Tsuma Shibori					
	Ero Manga Mitai na Koi Shiyo					
	Square Sisters					
	Shakkin Shimai					
	Cafe Junkie					
August 29 – February 27, 2009	Cobra the Animation	6	Magic Bus	Buichi Terasawa	Kobura THE animēshon za saikogan	
September 12	Quiz Magic Academy: The Original Animation	1	AIC PLUS+	Keitaro Motonaga	Kuizu majikku akademī ~ The Original Animation ~	
September 21	Mushrambo	2	Toei Animation	Tetsuo Imazawa	Mashuranbō (2008)	
September 26	Lucky☆Star OVA	1	Kyoto Animation	Yasuhiro Takemoto	Rakisuta ovu~a (orijinaruna bijuaru to animēshon)	
October 3	Initial D Extra Stage 2	1	A.C.G.T.	Tsuneo Tominaga	Kashiramoji D ekusutora sutēji 2	
October 17 – February 17, 2009	Goodbye Mr. Despair OAD	3	Shaft	Akiyuki Simbo	Goku sayonara zetsubō-sensei	
October 24	Gunslinger Girl: Il Teatrino OVA	2	Artland	Hiroshi Ishiodori (chief); Akira Mano	Gansuringā gāru - IL TEATRINO - ovu~a	
October 24 – February 25, 2009	Switch	2	Actas	Naoki Oohira	Suitchi	
October 24 – April 24, 2009	MS IGLOO 2: Gravity Front	3	Sunrise	Takashi Imanishi	Kidō senshi Gandamu MS igurū 2 jūryoku sensen	
October 29 – February 25, 2009	Master of Martial Hearts	5	Arms	Yoshitaka Fujimoto	Zettai Shougeki~ Puratonikku hāto ~	
November 3 – January 5, 2009	My Bride is a Mermaid OVA	2	AIC; Gonzo	Seiji Kishi	Seto no hanayome ovu~a	
November 24	One Piece: Romance Dawn Story	1	Toei Animation	Katsumi Tokoro	Wan pīsu romansu dōn sutōrī	
December 22	Kamen no Maid Guy: Ano Natsu, Ichiban Yutaka na Chichi.	1	Madhouse	Masayuki Sakoi	Kamen'no meido gai ano natsu, ichiban yutaka chichi.	
December 22 – April 6, 2015	Kissxsis	12	Feel	Munenori Nawa	Kisu × shisu	
December 25 – March 25, 2009	D.C.if: Da Capo if	2	Zexcs	Shinji Ushiro	D. C. If 〜 da kāpo ifu 〜	

== See also ==
- 2008 in Japanese television
- 2008 in television
- 2008 in animation
