= The One That Got Away (American Dad!) =

- American Dad! episode
- Episode no.: Season 5 Episode 2
- Directed by: Tim Parsons
- Written by: Chris McKenna; Matt McKenna
- Production code: 3AJN16
- Original air date: October 5, 2008

Guest appearances
- Diane Delano as Store Clerk; John DiMaggio as The Hitman; J. K. Simmons as Mr. McCreary

Episode chronology
← Previous "1600 Candles"	Next → "One Little Word"
- American Dad! season 5

"The One That Got Away" is the second episode of the fifth season of the American animated television series American Dad!. It originally aired on Fox in the United States on October 5, 2008. In the episode, Roger's credit card is maxed out and he is certain it's identity theft, but the culprit is one Roger would’ve never suspected. The idea for "The One That Got Away" came from a writer's fixation on The Big Lebowski, with the original concept including Jeff Lebowski being Roger's alter ego. The episode received mostly positive reviews from critics, with much praise going towards Roger's identity theft plot.

"The One That Got Away" was written by Chris and Matt McKenna and directed by Tim Parsons. The episode features guest performances of Diane Delano, John DiMaggio and J.K. Simmons.

== Plot ==
The episode begins with the family staging an intervention with Roger about his alcoholism. They also express concern that he may have an inferiority complex because he spends so much time in disguises. Roger dismisses their concerns, but shortly afterwards discovers that someone has maxed out his credit card. Vowing revenge, he discovers that someone named Sidney Huffman is responsible. Roger begins to destroy Sidney's life by ruining his employment and telling lies to Huffman's girlfriend Judy Panawits, resulting in her breaking off the relationship. He then sneaks into Sidney's apartment, intending to set it on fire. When he sees a photograph of Sidney he realizes that he and Sidney are the same person.

In a flashback from four days earlier, Sidney wakes up in bed feeling hungover, despite refraining from alcohol. He is shown to be a humble and polite Bible salesman, soon to be proposing to Judy. Discovering that someone is out to kill him, he calls Roger to beg him to stop, Sidney only encounters an abusive message, and realizes that Roger is not going to stop until he is gone. A hitman hired by Sidney appears and attempts to kill Roger. Desperate, Roger locates Judy at her department store workplace, and admits to her that he is both Roger and Sidney together. The hitman enters the store and takes aim at Roger again. Glad of the distraction, Roger attempts to escape but is stopped when he is confronted by his Sidney persona in the mirror. Sidney is adamant that he is just as valid as Roger, despite Roger's attempts to convince him otherwise by using a pair of black leather gloves they each had one part of. Roger suddenly remembers how this split-personality came about - it was part of a convoluted scheme to steal the gloves from Judy's department store. To do this he took out a credit card in the name of Sidney, the name the employees at the store knew him by. But after the theft was discovered and Judy was fired, Roger's guilt forced the personality split, causing him to live as "clean" Sidney during the day, and his normal self at night. The two embrace, but Roger stabs Sidney in the back, causing his Sidney persona to disappear. He confronts Judy, and decides to resume his relationship with her, but this time as Roger. The two walk off together, hand in hand with Judy revealing she is intersex.

Meanwhile, the rest of the family becomes obsessed with playing a game of Simon. Unable to move, even to eat or relieve themselves, Klaus rescues them by setting off a smoke bomb, causing both the Simon game and Klaus himself to disappear. Seconds later Klaus re-appears, fighting and killing a monster from another dimension. Klaus then says that he was gone for sixty years to him and asks how long it had been back at home.

== Production ==
"The One That Got Away" was written by Chris and Matt McKenna and directed by Tim Parsons. Jennifer Graves served as the assistant director. Co-creator Mike Barker considered it "maybe our most ambiguous episode to date", being the first episode to feature just Roger in the A-story. It was also the first nonlinear episode they had done, with Chris McKenna noting that the second act takes place in the same place as the first. Chris and Matt McKenna came up with the storyline via their "obsession" with The Big Lebowski, imagining how funny it would be if someone urinated on Roger's rug and then he had to figure out who had come after him. Jeff Lebowski would turn out to be an alter ego of Roger, and that got them thinking of storylines involving Roger and his multiple personas, and if "one of them got away." The original story for the episode was that Roger would wake up in Shanghai and in trouble, caused by an evil persona. Chris and Matt McKenna pitched it to Barker, who declined it. They later rewrote it, this time making his persona "the good guy", and the opposite of Roger. Director Tim Parsons tried to make a difference between Roger's world and his alter ego Sidney's world, making the colors in Sidney's world "pastelly" and the backgrounds softer.

Co-creator Seth MacFarlane, who provides the voice of Roger, also provided the voice of Sidney. MacFarlane is often very busy and does not have time to read the script before the table read. However, before voicing Sidney, the producers asked him if he could read the script the night before, to come up with a voice that sounded like an "old-fashioned Dick Powell." Rachael MacFarlane provided the voice of Judy Panawits. Diane Delano, John DiMaggio and J.K. Simmons guest starred in the episode.

== Reception ==
In its original broadcast on October 5, 2008, "The One That Got Away" was viewed by 6.85 million viewers, according to the Nielsen ratings. It finished first in its timeslot, acquiring a 3.5 rating in the 18–49 demographic. The episode finished third in total viewership among the shows in the "Animation Domination" lineup on Fox.

Steve Heisler of The A.V. Club enjoyed the Roger story, but criticized the B-story involving the Smiths and Klaus, saying that it "didn't fit with what was going on, and thus distracted from the story." However, he praised the episode for being "great, albeit slightly imperfect" and "surprisingly solid" to be a Roger-centric story. He gave the episode a B rating, the best grade of the night, beating the Family Guy, King of the Hill and The Simpsons episodes that it aired with. While reviewing the American Dad! Volume 4 DVD set, Thomas Spurlin of DVD Talk, wrote that the episode, alongside "Spring Break-Up" and "Escape from Pearl Bailey", "deliver[s] laughs [...] along with offering bizarrely compelling stories in their compact time." Also reviewing the DVD set, Clark Douglas of DVD Verdict deemed the episode to be one of the highlights.
