= Magic Candies =

Animated short film

- Directed by: Daisuke Nishio
- Written by: Baek Hee-na
- Produced by: Takashi Washio
- Music by: Naoki Satō
- Production company: Toei Animation
- Release date: 2024
- Running time: 21 minutes
- Country: Japan
- Language: Japanese

Magic Candies is a 2024 Japanese animated short film directed by Daisuke Nishio, written by Baek Hee-na and produced by Japanese animation studio Toei Animation. The story is inspired by the Korean picture book Magic Candies. The 21-minute film took four years to complete. It premiered at the 2024 New York International Children's Film Festival and has received several nominations and awards, including a nomination for the Grand Jury Prize at the 2024 AFI Fest and a nomination for the Best Short Film award at the BFI London Film Festival. In January 2025, Magic Candies was nominated for an Academy Award in the Best Animated Short Film category, marking the first Toei film to achieve that honor.

== Plot ==
Dong-Dong is a young, friendless boy who enjoys playing with marbles. While trying to purchase more, he instead buys round candies, and samples them when he gets home.

The first, patterned like the couch in the family home, allows him to actually speak to the couch, but only as long as the candy is in his mouth. The couch asks him to retrieve the remote from its side, and requests that he tell his father to stop farting on it so much. Shocked, Dong-Dong agrees, and shortly after, the candy melts away, leaving the couch inanimate once more.

Realizing that the candies are magic, Dong-Dong tries the next, which is the pattern of his dog, Gusuri. He asks why Gusuri no longer likes playing with him, and Gusuri explains that he's now an older dog, and prefers quieter activities. Gusuri assures Dong-Dong that he loves him, as Dong-Dong comforted him when he was a puppy and takes good care of him. After they play together like old times, Gusuri uses their last moments of communication to urge Dong-Dong to make friends and not worry about him.

Dong-Dong's dad then arrives home. He is a strict father, having many rules and expectations for his son. Dong-Dong, annoyed at his overbearing nature, eats a candy while in bed, which is revealed to be connected to his father. He hears his father's affectionate, loving thoughts towards him, and Dong-Dong gets up to hug him, appreciating and reciprocating his feelings.

As Dong-Dong does his homework the next day, he tries his next candy, which is revealed to be bubblegum. The bubble floats out of the window, and returns with the voice of his late grandmother. His grandmother assures him that she is having fun in the afterlife, meeting her old friends and watching over him. Like Gusuri, she urges him to make friends of his own. Dong-Dong happily saves the gum under the desk, pleased that he can speak to his grandmother whenever he likes.

The next piece of candy leads him outside, where he hears the voices of leaves happily wishing each other good-bye as they fall from the trees. As he finishes the candy, Dong-Dong notices a boy his age watching him. The final piece of candy is clear and flavorless, and Dong-Dong decides to create his own voice for it, asking the other boy if he wants to play. The boy agrees and they become good friends.

== Reception ==
Year	Award	Award/Category	Status	Ref
2024	New York International Children's Film Festival	Jury Award for Best Animated Short	Won	
2024	Zlín International Film Festival for Children and Youth	Golden Slipper for Best Short Animation for Children	Won	
2024	AFI Fest	Grand Jury Prize	Nominated	
2024	Cinekid Festival	Best International Short Film	Won	
2024	Sapporo International Short Film Festival	Japan Premiere Award	Won	
2024	BFI London Film Festival	Best Short Film	Nominated	
2024	Cambridge Film Festival	Audience Award for Best Short Film	Won	
2024	Giffoni Film Festival	Official Competition	Nominated	
2024	Vancouver International Film Festival	International Competition	Nominated	
2025	Academy Awards	Best Animated Short Film	Nominated	
