= American Dad! season 5 =

American Dad!
- Season 5
- Volume Five DVD cover art, which features episodes 7-20 from season five.
- Starring: Seth MacFarlane; Wendy Schaal; Scott Grimes; Rachael MacFarlane; Dee Bradley Baker
- No. of episodes: 20

Release
- Original network: Fox
- Original release: September 28, 2008 – May 17, 2009

Season chronology
- ← Previous; Season 4 Next → Season 6

The fifth season of the American TV series American Dad! originally aired on Fox from September 28, 2008, to May 17, 2009, and consisted of twenty episodes. It was released as two DVD box sets and in syndication. American Dad! follows the dysfunctional Smith family—father Stan, mother Francine, daughter Hayley, son Steve, the pet fish Klaus, and extraterrestrial alien Roger, all of whom reside in their hometown of Langley Falls, Virginia. Season 5, which premiered with the episode "1600 Candles" and ended with "Stan's Night Out", was executive produced by David Zuckerman, Kenny Schwartz, Rick Wiener, Richard Appel, Matt Weitzman, Mike Barker, and series creator Seth MacFarlane. Weitzman and Barker served as the season's showrunners.

Season 5 satirized various political and social topics, including incest, the coming out aspect of homosexuality, and appeal to fear propaganda. The season was met with generally positive reception from critics. Some went on to criticize the show for the level of inconsistency. However, the overall development of the show during this season was praised by critics, saying that "the show has grown into its own over the past seasons." The season premiere was nominated for a Primetime Emmy Award for Outstanding Animated Program (for Programming Less Than One Hour) in 2009.

The Volume 4 DVD box set was released in Region 1 on April 28, 2009, Region 2 on April 20, 2009, and Region 4 on November 18, 2009. Six of the 21 episodes are included in the Volume 4 DVD box set. The remaining fourteen episodes of the season were released on the Volume 5 DVD box set, released in Region 1 on June 15, 2010, Region 2 on June 14, 2010, and Region 4 on November 3, 2010.

== Production ==
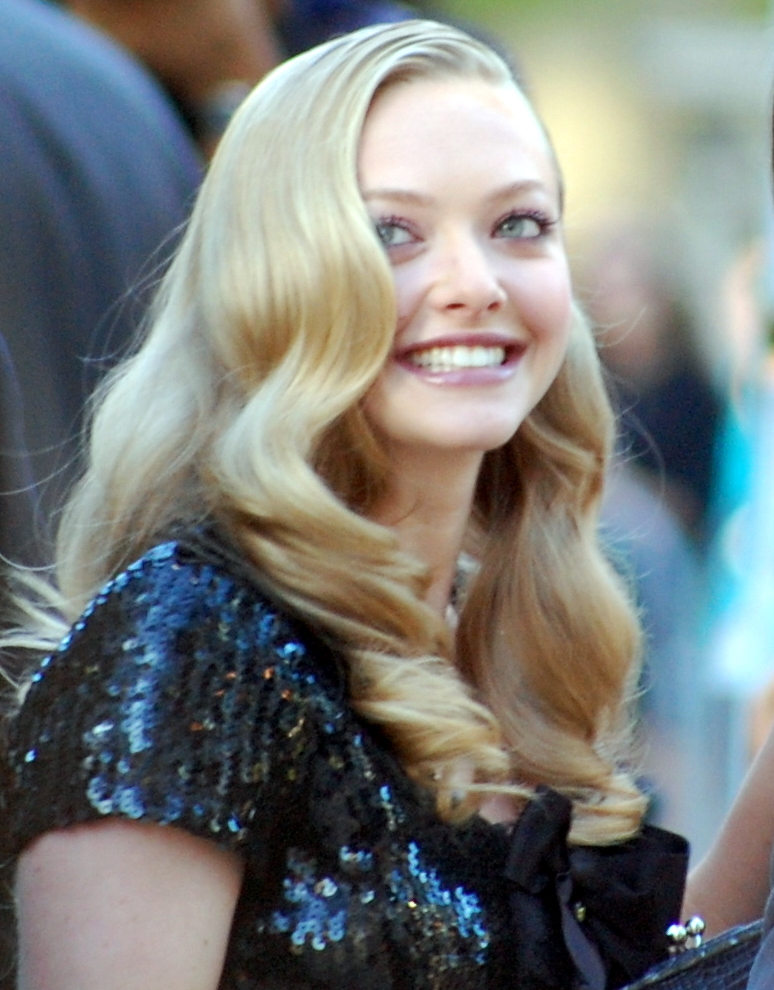
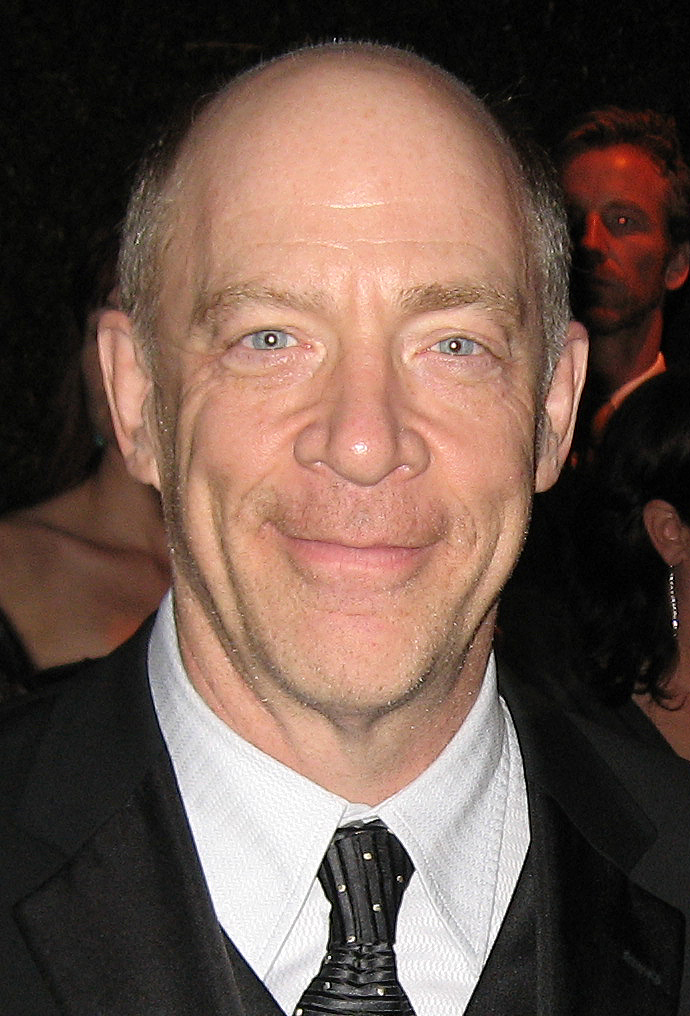
Amanda Seyfried (left) and J. K. Simmons (right) were some of several actors that made guest appearances on the show.

During Season 4, episodes of American Dad! and its sister show, Family Guy, were delayed from regular broadcast due to the 2007–08 Writers Guild of America strike. Seth MacFarlane, the creator of the series, publicly sided with the Writers Guild, and fully participated in the strike and other events pertaining to the issue. The official production of American Dad! started to dwindle as of February 2008, with a delay in production becoming imminent through much of March and April. The strike ended on February 12, 2008; and the series resumed airing regularly within a few months.

Production for Season 5 began in 2008, during the airing of the Season 4. The season was executive produced by series regulars David Zuckerman, Kenny Schwartz, Rick Wiener, Richard Appel, Matt Weitzman, Mike Barker, and series creator Seth MacFarlane. The showrunners for the season were Weitzman and Barker. As production began Matt Weitzman, Jim Bernstein, Chris and Matt McKenna, Brian Boyle, Erik Sommers, Laura McCreary, Jonathan Fener, Erik Durbin, David Zuckerman and Kenny Schwartz all stayed on from the previous season. Both Matt Fusfeld and Alex Cuthbertson received their first writing credit for the series. Directors Pam Cooke, Josh Aoshima, Tim Parsons, Rodney Clouden, Albert Calleros, Joe Daniello, and Bob Bowen all stayed with the show from the previous season. David Hemingson left the series, and went on to co-direct for other television shows, notably How I Met Your Mother, and went on to create a short-lived television series, entitled The Deep End. Michael Shipley and Dan Vebber also left at the end of the third production season.

The main cast consisted of Seth MacFarlane (Stan Smith, Roger, Greg Corbin, among others), Wendy Schaal (Francine Smith), Rachael MacFarlane (Hayley Smith, among others), Scott Grimes (Steve Smith) and Dee Bradley Baker (Klaus Heissler, among others). Several new characters were created and introduced in Season 5. The character of Sidney—a persona of Roger who escapes to start a life of his own—was introduced in the episode "The One That Got Away". He was voiced by the series creator Seth MacFarlane. Avery Bullock's wife, Mariam, who was kidnapped and held hostage by terrorists for three years, was also introduced and voiced by Jean Smart. Amy, one of Lisa Silver's friends and a frequent bully of Steve, was introduced during this season. Amanda Seyfried provided the voice for the character. J.K. Simmons provided the voice of Mr. McCreary, the founder and chairman of a local Bible print shop, and Reginald the Koala, another "volunteer" from the CIA's secret brain-swap program. He is voiced by Donald Fullilove until midway through next season, where writer Erik Durbin provides the voice. Other guest stars who made multiple appearances as recurring characters from previous seasons were Patrick Stewart as Avery Bullock, Stan's boss at the CIA and Mike Barker as Terry Bates, who briefly returned in the episode "Daddy Queerest".

Starting with season 5, the opening sequence of the series was revamped. Instead of Stan picking up a newspaper with a different headline on it, there is now a recurring gag of Roger appearing in different disguises from under the dashboard. Stan's interaction with the family and his commute from his house to the CIA have also been modified. This would remain the series' intro for 17 seasons, until being replaced with Season 22's opening sequence.

== Episodes ==
| No. overall | No. in season | Title | Directed by | Written by | Original release date | Prod. code | U.S. viewers (millions) |
|---|---|---|---|---|---|---|---|
| 59 | 1 | "1600 Candles" | Caleb Meurer | Rick Wiener & Kenny Schwartz | September 28, 2008 | 3AJN20 | 6.89 |
Roger becomes excited when he turns 1600, and he spies on his family as they prepare to throw a birthday party for him. Much to his dismay, Roger is interrupted when Steve runs down the stairs and reveals to the family that he has grown his first pubic hair. Stan and Francine become horrified when they hear of the news, and they begin to take drastic measures to deal with Steve's puberty after having reoccurring memories of when Hayley began menstruating, which is what turned her aggressive. While Francine desperately goes to the CIA to get some aging retardant, Steve makes plans with Lisa Silver to meet up at a Macy's. During his sleep, Francine injects the aging retardant, only to wake up to him morphing into a toddler. Steve becomes enraged when he sees this, and Lisa Silver angrily walks out of the store. Steve is given another opportunity as going with Lisa, this time as the school prom. Stan and Francine later inject a different serum into Steve during his sleep. However, much to their dismay, Steve is an elder. Stan and Francine later drops Steve off at his school, and give him the antidote. Some of the school bullies later give Steve a swirly, claiming that the first pubic hair is nothing special, and the hair is blown out the window, drifts across the town, only to finally land onto Roger's birthday cake.: Note: This is the first episode to use the revamped opening sequence, which would remain as the series' opening until 'Aw Rats, A Pool Party'.
| 60 | 2 | "The One That Got Away" | Tim Parsons | Chris McKenna & Matt McKenna | October 5, 2008 | 3AJN16 | 6.86 |
The Smith family schedule an intervention to tackle down Roger's rampant alcoholism. When Roger arrives drunk at the house, they also mention his tendency to have an inferiority complex from wearing his various costumes and personas. Ignoring their worries, Roger goes shopping for beer, only to find out that his credit card has maxed out. He later investigates who the culprit is, revealing to be Sidney Hoffman. He vows to make Hoffman's life a living hell, and he gets Hoffman unemployed, sets his apartment on fire, and breaks up with his fiancée. At his home, Roger discovers that he is Sidney Hoffman. Unknown to him, Sidney has hired a hitman to kill him. While at a department store, the Sidney Hoffman persona confronts Roger in a dressing room. Roger stabs Hoffman to death, and Hoffman's ex is seen holding hands with Roger, revealing to him that she's a hermaphrodite.
| 61 | 3 | "One Little Word" | Rodney Clouden | David Zuckerman | October 19, 2008 | 3AJN18 | 6.63 |
Stan becomes envious that he does not get any special treatment after seeing a coworker dine with his boss, Avery Bullock, at the executive lounge. He is finally given the opportunity to become Bullock's personal assistant after Stan's coworker refused to stand in line to get Bullock opera tickets due to personal issues. Bullock leaves his son, Avery Jr., in the care of Francine on various occasions, in which she later is on the verge of a mental breakdown. Stan accompanies his boss on various errands, including picking up women for sex and retrieving his wife from being held captive by terrorists in Fallujah. When the ordeal ends, Francine and Stan plan their Valentine's Day trip to an old honeymoon spot. When they arrive, Francine finds out that Stan has been harboring Bullock's son, as well as his mistress in a nearby cabin in an attempt to hide her from his wife. Bullock's wife, infuriated by his betrayal, shoots him in the knee and takes Avery Jr. home with her. In pain, Bullock pleads Stan to call the paramedics, but Stan blatantly refuses. He carries Francine out of the cabin and proceeds to kiss her. Dick is currently Bullock's number one.
| 62 | 4 | "Choosy Wives Choose Smith" | Joe Daniello | Matt Fusfeld & Alex Cuthbertson | November 2, 2008 | 3AJN15 | 7.09 |
Stan announces to Francine that he has become a registered pilot, much to her dismay. Francine reveals to Stan that before meeting him, she was once engaged to a pilot who has been presumed dead. When the pilot, named Travis, suddenly is found to be alive, she had already reengaged to Stan. Stan becomes upset and envious that Francine was with another man prior to him, and he tracks Travis down. When he and Roger arrive in Montana, Travis is found to be a wealthy rancher. Stan returns to Langley Falls to reveal to Francine that he has tracked down Travis in order to see his qualities. He struggles to schedule events, even going as far as to plan a dinner. Frustrated, Francine does not settle and tells Stan that she loves him. Stan, reluctant to believe her, sets up a staged crash with Roger and fakes his death. They arrive and relax at a remote island, only to be washed away by a tsunami. After being stranded out at sea for three months, Stan and Roger are saved, and they return home. Francine is ecstatic to see Stan, only to have Travis walk into their reunion. Francine later reveals that she faked having a relationship with Travis in an attempt to make Stan jealous. Angry, Travis leaves the house. Meanwhile, Steve finds a stray cat. He tries on various occasions to befriend the cat, only to be the victim of multiple attacks.
| 63 | 5 | "Escape from Pearl Bailey" | Bob Bowen | Dan Vebber | November 9, 2008 | 3AJN19 | 6.54 |
Steve gets back together with his ex-girlfriend Debbie, much to the jealousy of his friends. His rival, Lisa Silver, organizes a campaign to become the student council president of the school. Debbie devises a plan to run against Lisa, much to her frustration. Lisa threatens to humiliate her if she makes a successful campaign. A slander post was made by Lisa and her friends in an attempt to humiliate Debbie, enraging Steve. Steve initiates a plot to gain revenge for his girlfriend, which includes infecting one of Lisa's stuffed animals with herpes. Debbie is horrified when he tells her about this, and she ends their relationship. Steve soon realizes Snot, Toshi and Barry made the slander post and framed Lisa and her friends. When their actions are discovered, the whole school chases them down. They stumble upon an empty room, only to find Debbie and her friends. Steve explains to her why he went through with the plan, and Debbie reluctantly accepts his apology. Steve and his friends manage to escape from the school, where Francine is waiting for them. However, the whole school corners them, and they mercilessly attack them.
| 64 | 6 | "Pulling Double Booty" | John Aoshima | Brian Boyle | November 16, 2008 | 3AJN21 | 6.76 |
Hayley goes on a rampage shortly after Jeff breaks up with her. Francine and Stan try to help their daughter get through the grief, as the police have informed them that she will go to jail if she has another rampage. Francine later peeps into Hayley's room one night, only to find her making out with a person that closely resembles Stan. Disturbed and horrified, she confronts Stan only for the look-alike to come out with Hayley. The look-alike, named Bill, is Stan's CIA body double, and is later caught by Stan attempting to have sex with Francine. They kick him out of the house, and Stan vows to act as Bill to prevent Hayley from going on another rampage. Meanwhile, Roger and Steve get summer jobs of determining the gender of baby chicks.
| 65 | 7 | "Phantom of the Telethon" | Brent Woods | Mike Barker & Matt Weitzman | November 30, 2008 | 3AJN22 | 5.56 |
Stan learns that the Central Intelligence Agency (CIA) can no longer afford torture devices as the Democrats are shifting money to teaching inner city children to read. While Stan tries to come up with ideas for revenue-raising inventions, Roger suggests that the CIA hold a telethon, which Stan says is a stupid idea. The next day however, Stan then suggests a telethon and takes all the credit and does not admit that it was Roger's idea, despite his protests. During the telethon, Roger decides to take his revenge by ruining the show in a persona he deems as "The Phantom of the Telethon".
| 66 | 8 | "Chimdale" | Pam Cooke & Jansen Yee | Keith Heisler | January 25, 2009 | 4AJN01 | 5.72 |
When Steve suffers indignities in school because of his scoliosis (and the corrective brace he has to wear for six weeks because of it), Stan confides with him an embarrassing secret of his own: he's bald and wears a wig. When Steve discovers that he's been lying to him all this time, he overreacts and tries to expose the secret to the rest of the family. Meanwhile, Roger brings both Francine and Hayley to a posh spa, even though he has only two passes, raising the suspicions of the house detective.
| 67 | 9 | "Stan Time" | Joe Daniello | Jonathan Fener | February 8, 2009 | 4AJN02 | 4.60 |
Feeling exhausted all the time, Stan begins taking pills that allow him to stay up all night and feel like he had a full night's sleep. When Francine learns of the pills, he splits them with her so they can each follow their own pursuits during the night. Stan tries to use his newfound energy and time on hobbies whilst Francine studies Oceanography, and ends up going on a trip to search for a mythical creature. Stan enjoys his hobbies only to ultimately discover he would rather spend more time with his wife. Meanwhile, Roger and Steve are asked to make a screenplay for a pornographic film, but they are so focused on finding flaws in each others ideas they fail to notice other things.
| 68 | 10 | "Family Affair" | Tim Parsons | Erik Durbin | February 15, 2009 | 4AJN03 | 5.88 |
Roger has been making excuses about prior commitments, prompting the Smiths to realize that he has been "cheating" on them with other families. The Smiths take action to teach Roger a lesson about monogamy until Roger discovers for himself why he is not a one-family kind of guy.
| 69 | 11 | "Live and Let Fry" | Albert Calleros | Laura McCreary | March 1, 2009 | 4AJN04 | 5.66 |
When Langley Falls implements a ban on trans fats, Stan finds himself legally separated from his favorite foods. He sets a poor example for the rest of the family when he blatantly disregards the law by crossing county lines and using Steve as a trans-fatty food mule to satisfy his own gluttonous desires.
| 70 | 12 | "Roy Rogers McFreely" | Bob Bowen | Brian Boyle | March 8, 2009 | 4AJN05 | 5.37 |
Roger is mad at Stan, so he wrests control of the Langley Falls Homeowners Association from him, then abuses his power and changes the town's American character.
| 71 | 13 | "Jack's Back" | Rodney Clouden | David Zuckerman | March 15, 2009 | 4AJN07 | 5.88 |
Steve signs Stan up for a father-son bike tournament, but the plan veers off-track when Stan admits that his father never taught him how to ride a bike. Determined to make things better, Steve helps reconcile Stan with his convict father. Meanwhile, Hayley needs internship credit for school, so Roger hires her to bartend at his makeshift bar in the attic.
| 72 | 14 | "Bar Mitzvah Hustle" | Brent Woods | Chris McKenna & Matt McKenna | March 22, 2009 | 4AJN06 | 5.84 |
Steve and the gang sabotage a stuck-up kid's bar mitzvah, after he hits on Steve's girlfriend, Debbie. But when Snot is wrongly accused of stealing the kid's bar mitzvah money, he must answer to the Rabbi, putting his own celebration in jeopardy. Meanwhile, Stan and Francine pitch an idea to a cell phone company, but the plan gets "dropped" when they cannot deliver the goods.
| 73 | 15 | "Wife Insurance" | John Aoshima | Erik Sommers | March 29, 2009 | 4AJN08 | 6.02 |
When Stan gets kidnapped in Colombia, Francine fears he is gone for good. Stan finally reappears unharmed, but the real trouble erupts in the Smith household when he admits that he has a plan to marry his dentist if Francine dies before him. Meanwhile, Steve and Roger play detective duo "Wheels and the Legman".
| 74 | 16 | "Delorean Story-an" | Joe Daniello | Matt Fusfeld & Alex Cuthbertson | April 19, 2009 | 4AJN09 | 5.72 |
Stan is excited about finally building his dream car: a DeLorean. Francine encourages him to include Steve, so the two take a road trip in search of doors for the sports car. The trip veers off-track when there is a mad dash across the country to get the last set of doors available. Meanwhile, Roger and Francine start an adventure without Hayley because they think she isn't fun.
| 75 | 17 | "Every Which Way But Lose" | Pam Cooke & Jansen Yee | Steve Hely | April 26, 2009 | 4AJN10 | 5.13 |
Steve joins a junior football team to make Stan proud. However, when a hyper-competitive Stan assumes the position of head coach, Steve gets kicked off the team for not being good enough. Out for revenge, Steve and Roger recruit a new team of misfits who threaten Stan's perfect season, and when he loses, he decides to give up on life. Meanwhile, Francine and Hayley compete for a blue ribbon at the Langley County Fair.
| 76 | 18 | "Weiner of Our Discontent" | Tim Parsons | Laura McCreary | May 3, 2009 | 4AJN11 | 5.35 |
Stan has had enough of Roger's antics! When he calls Roger out, Roger claims he has been sent to Earth to determine the fate of mankind. Stan challenges him to prove it, and is tickled pink when he learns Roger's real purpose for being on Earth. Roger struggles to get a grip on reality until a fateful turn of events helps put things in perspective.
| 77 | 19 | "Daddy Queerest" | Albert Calleros | Nahnatchka Khan | May 10, 2009 | 4AJN12 | 4.88 |
Neighbors Terry and Greg are nervous when Terry's father, football great Tank Bates, announces that he will be coming to town for a visit. Terry is worried because his dad does not know he is gay, has a baby or lives with his partner. Meanwhile, Steve goes on a drunken bender and learns the meaning of "beer goggles".
| 78 | 20 | "Stan's Night Out" | Bob Bowen | Jim Bernstein | May 17, 2009 | 4AJN13 | 5.64 |
Stan leaves Francine at home to go out with the boys, but guys' night out goes from wild to reckless when Stan finds himself in one compromising situation after another. Meanwhile, Roger and Hayley use their charm and looks to attract a frat boy.

== Home media ==
The first six episodes of the fifth season and the last eight episode of the fourth season were released on DVD by 20th Century Fox in the United States and Canada on April 28, 2009, nearly a year after the production of the third season was finished. The "Volume Four" DVD release features bonus material including deleted scenes, animatics, and commentaries for every episode.

The remaining fourteen episodes of the fifth season were released under the title "Volume Five" by 20th Century Fox in the United States and Canada on June 15, 2010, a month after they had completed broadcast on television. The DVD release also features bonus material including deleted scenes, commentaries, and two mini-games.

American Dad Volume Four
| Set details | | | Special features |
| 14 episodes; 3-disc set; 1.33:1 aspect ratio; Languages: English (Dolby Digital 5.1, with subtitles); Spanish (Dolby Digital, with subtitles); French (Dolby Digital); Portuguese (Dolby Digital) | | | Audio commentaries for all 14 episodes; Deleted/extended scenes with optional commentary; "Tearjerker" featurette; "Mask of Disguise" featurette; Comic-Con International |
| Release dates | | | Audio commentaries for all 14 episodes; Deleted/extended scenes with optional commentary; "Tearjerker" featurette; "Mask of Disguise" featurette; Comic-Con International |
| Region 1 | Region 2 | Region 4 | Audio commentaries for all 14 episodes; Deleted/extended scenes with optional commentary; "Tearjerker" featurette; "Mask of Disguise" featurette; Comic-Con International |
| April 28, 2009 | April 20, 2009 | November 18, 2009 | Audio commentaries for all 14 episodes; Deleted/extended scenes with optional commentary; "Tearjerker" featurette; "Mask of Disguise" featurette; Comic-Con International |

American Dad Volume Five
| Set details | | | Special features |
| 14 episodes; 3-disc set; 1.33:1 aspect ratio; Languages: English (Dolby Digital 5.1, with subtitles); Spanish (Dolby Digital, with subtitles); French (Dolby Digital); Portuguese (Dolby Digital) | | | Uncensored commentary for all 14 episodes; Deleted scenes; The Power Hour Drinking Game; Bar Mitzvah Hustle Fact-Up Trivia |
| Release dates | | | Uncensored commentary for all 14 episodes; Deleted scenes; The Power Hour Drinking Game; Bar Mitzvah Hustle Fact-Up Trivia |
| Region 1 | Region 2 | Region 4 | Uncensored commentary for all 14 episodes; Deleted scenes; The Power Hour Drinking Game; Bar Mitzvah Hustle Fact-Up Trivia |
| June 15, 2010 | June 14, 2010 | November 3, 2010 | Uncensored commentary for all 14 episodes; Deleted scenes; The Power Hour Drinking Game; Bar Mitzvah Hustle Fact-Up Trivia |

== Reception ==
American Dad doesn't entirely rely on easily interchangeable jokes like Family Guy. And, because of this, the end result is a much more formulated and comprehensible political commentary. However, American Dad never fully reaches the satirical sharpness of superior comedic farces like South Park, The Daily Show or, most notably, The Colbert Report. And this may leave many viewers wanting.

— R.L. Shaffer
IGN

The season premiere for the fifth season of American Dad! received 6.89 million viewers upon its initial airing, the second highest viewed episode of the season. The total viewership for the episode significantly increased from the fourth season premiere, which was viewed by 6.07 million viewers upon its original airing. In the weeks following "1600 Candles", the total viewership ratings hovered right under 7 million. The fourth episode of the season, "Choosy Wives Choose Smith", garnered the highest ratings of the season, having been watched by 7.09 million viewers. This would be the highest rated American Dad! episode since the season four episode "Tearjerker", as this episode received 8.62 million viewers upon its initial airing. The ninth episode of the season, "Stan Time", gained the lowest number of viewers of the season with 4.60 million viewers. The average total viewership for the season per episode was 5.5 million viewers, and the season average for ratings in the 18–49 demographic per episode was a 2.9 rating. The average rating increased by 20% from the previous season. However, the average total viewership would decrease by 16% from the previous season.

Reviews for the episodes, as well as the season as a whole, were met with mainly positive reception from critics. In his review for the season, Hunter Daniels of Collider gave it a mixed review. He opined: "American Dad is not a great show. However, it's pretty funny on occasion. This set is about on par with the other seasons and might well be worth a purchase for hardcore fans and completeists. If you think you will like it, you will. If you're on the fence [...] it's probably only a rental." R.L. Shaffer of IGN said that "American Dad comes from the weird and wicked mind of Seth MacFarlane, who brought us the irreverent and often puerile powerhouse Family Guy [...], and like the show[s], American Dad offers a supreme dose of silly mockery that's occasionally offensive [...] and outrageously wacky through-and-through." However, he criticized the show for having similar problem that he thought existed in Family Guy. Shaffer opined: "American Dad suffers from many of the same problems as Family Guy. The show quite often stumbles into territory it's simply not mature enough to handle. And because the show already plays like Family Guy 2.0, the characters and settings aren't quite original enough to keep the material fresh." He gave the release a 6 out of 10, signifying a "passable" score.

Kevin Stanley of Cinema.com gave the season a very positive review, writing, "Overall American Dad is consistently funny and amusing, it's certainly in my opinion, currently the best animated comedy and has been for some time. It is literally laugh-a-minute stuff, which can't be said for all TV shows, even the ones that do bill themselves as comedy. The moments of perfect pitch-black humour, that pop up every so often, are worth the cost of the boxset alone." From the selection of season four episode of the Volume Four DVD box set, he called "1600 Candles" and "The One That Got Away" as the highlights. Steve Heisler of The A.V. Club generally reacted positively to the majority of American Dad! episodes of the fifth season. He gave the highest grades to the episodes "Delorean Story-an" and "Choosy Wives Choose Smith", which was an 'A'.

=== Awards and nominations ===
The fifth-season premiere, "1600 Candles", was nominated for a Primetime Emmy Award for Outstanding Animated Program (for Programming Less Than One Hour) in 2009. It competed against Robot Chicken, The Simpsons and South Park at the 61st Primetime Emmy Awards, which was held September 12, 2009. The South Park episode "Margaritaville" ultimately won the award.
