= RoboDz Kazagumo Hen =

2008 television series

ロボディーズ -RoboDz- 風雲篇 (Robodīzu -RoboDz- Kazagumo Hen)
- Genre: Science fiction, Comedy
- Anime television series
- Directed by: Daisuke Nishio
- Produced by: Yoshiyuki Ikezawa; Michiyo Hayashi
- Written by: Yoshimichi Hosoi; Ikuko Takahashi; Kenichi Yamada; Hidehiko Kadota; Isao Murayama
- Studio: Toei Animation; The Walt Disney Company
- Original network: Toon Disney; Disney Channel Asia
- Original run: 2 June 2008 – 24 November 2008
- Episodes: 26

RoboDz Kazagumo Hen (ロボディーズ -RoboDz- 風雲篇, Robodīzu -RoboDz- Kazagumo Hen) is an animated series co-produced by The Walt Disney Company and Toei Animation. It began airing on Toon Disney in Japan on June 21, 2008. The episodes are animated in 3D. The show premiered in the United States on June 29, 2009, on Disney XD as simply "RoboDz". The series also aired on Disney Channel Asia. It is the first anime to be co-produced by Disney Jeff Nimoy announced at The Anime Lodge that he would be writing and directing the English adaptation. It is a short-form series, with each episode lasting approximately 5 minutes.

== Staff ==
- Series Director: Daisuke Nishio
- Series Composition: Yoshimichi Hosoi
- Character Designs by: Naoki Miyahara
- CG Director: Kazuhiro Nishikawa
- Producers: Yoshiyuki Ikezawa (Toei Animation), Michiyo Hayashi (Walt Disney Television International Japan)

== Image Song ==
"Imaike Samba" (Sony Music Entertainment)
Lyrics by: Yasu Ichiban, Crystal Boy, Hidden Fish, Nori da Funky Shibire-sasu/Composed by: DJ Mitsu/Performed by: Nobodyknows+

== Episode list ==
No.	Title	Directed by	Written by	Original release date	Prod. code
1	"Story Sold Separately"	Yoshimichi Hosoi	Daisuke Nishio	June 29, 2009	101
2	"Jokes Not Included"	Yoshimichi Hosoi	Daisuke Nishio	July 11, 2009	102
3	"In Color"	Yoshimichi Hosoi	Naoki Miyahara	July 11, 2009	103
4	"Shake Well Before Watching"	Yoshimichi Hosoi	Naoki Miyahara	July 18, 2009	104
5	"Avoid Contact With Eyes"	Ikuko Takahashi	Hiroki Shibata	July 18, 2009	105
6	"No Preservatives or Story Added"	Kenichi Yamada	Hiroki Shibata	July 25, 2009	106
7	"Tastes Like Chicken"	Ikuko Takahashi	Hiroki Shibata	July 25, 2009	107

== See also ==
- Marvel Disk Wars: The Avengers (the second co-production between Walt Disney Japan and Toei Animation.)
