= Baek Hee-na =

South Korean illustrator of children's books

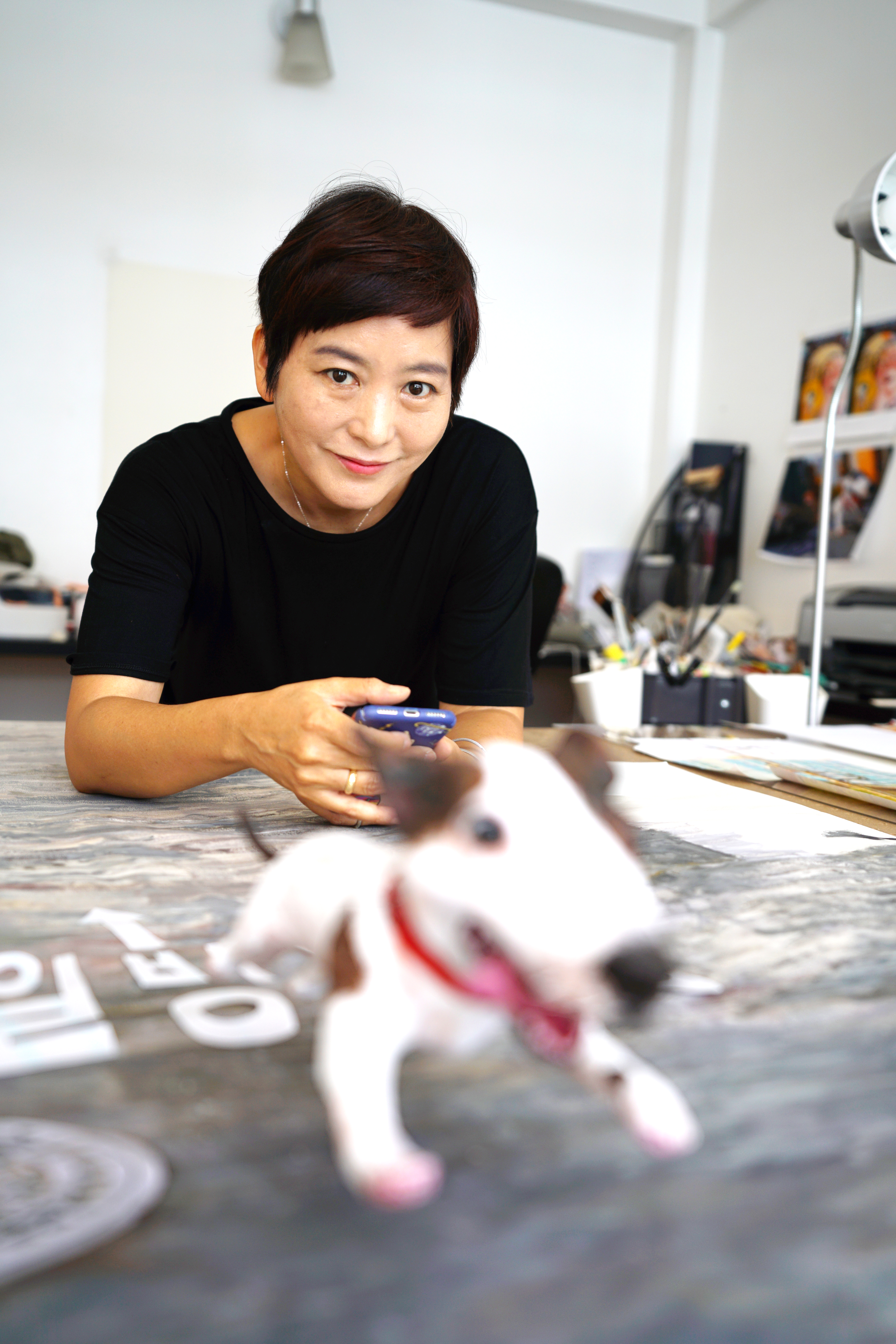
- Baek at her Atelier in 2020
- Born: 1 December 1971 (age 54); Seoul, South Korea
- Occupations: Author, Illustrator and Animator
- Writing career
- Language: Korean
- Genre: Picture Books
- Notable awards: Astrid Lindgren Memorial Award

Korean name
- Hangul: 백희나
- RR: Baek Huina
- MR: Paek Hŭina

Baek Hee-na (Korean: 백희나; born 1 December 1971 in Seoul) is a South Korean author of picture books, an illustrator and animator. She writes picture books with characters that have distinct personalities and with charming storytelling based on various illustration production experiences. Her representative work, Magic Candies, was selected as a recommended work and included on the IBBY Honour List in 2018 and produced as a musical in South Korea. Baek is the first South Korean to win the Astrid Lindgren Memorial Award (ALMA) in 2020. Her picture books have been translated and published in several languages, including English, German, Chinese, Japanese, Swedish and Norwegian.

== Life ==
Baek was born in Seoul in 1971, majored in Education Technology at Ewha Womans University and studied character animation at the California Institute of the Arts. After graduation, she worked as an animator in the U.S. and returned to South Korea to make her debut with her first picture book, Cloud Bread, in 2004. Film-related classes and studies of directing and storytelling became the basis of her work for picture books. Using her various animation production experiences, she writes picture books with characters that have distinct personalities and charming storytelling. She creates artwork, such as characters and backgrounds, with a lot of creativity, items, and details by participating in exhibitions and filming her work by herself. This allows the maintenance of the intimacy between the background and characters of picture books and the much more vivid conveyance of stories. She lives in Seoul with her husband, two children, and a dog.

== Career ==
Baek was selected as the illustrator of the Year for Fiction for her picture book Cloud Bread at the Bologna Children's Book Fair in 2005. Also, her book was selected and introduced in 100 Korean Picture Books at the Frankfurt Book Fair. Cloud Bread has been translated and published in about 10 countries. It was published in English in 2011 and produced as children's musical and TV animation as well. In 2012 and 2013, with the picture book The Bath Fairy, she won a prize at the 53rd Korea Publishing Culture Awards and Changwon Children's Literature Award. Magic Candies was included on the IBBY Honour List in 2018 and won the Picture Book Translation Award and Reader Award in the 24th Japanese Picture Book Awards, sponsored jointly by the Japan School Library Association and Mainichi Daily News in 2019. In 2020, she won the Astrid Lindgren Memorial Award (ALMA).

Despite selling over 500,000 copies of her book and associated merchandise drawing over ₩440 billion (USD $433 million as of 2014) in sales, Baek Hee-Na received only ₩18.5 million (about $18,200 in 2014) in royalties for creating the concept behind Cloud Bread and writing the story because of an unfair contract of the type common in Korea at the time. The issue led the Korean government to take action against publishing houses that issued these contracts.

== Style ==
Baek always tries something new in pictures or techniques. She produces and composes works of art and produces books through exhibitions and films, using a 3D illustration technique. Especially, she creates characters using ‘Sculpey.’ Several main characters are produced according to their major facial expressions. She utilizes the stop-motion animation technique. She produces the sets for stories herself and checks the lighting herself for photography to build up her unique world of artwork. The ALMA Steering Committee summarized her artwork as "develop[ing] the field of picture books" through "uncompromising and bold techniques and artistic solutions by interestingly combining crafts made by hand and animation elements.”

== Awards ==
- 2005 The Illustrator of the Year at the Bologna Children's Book Fair - Cloud Bread
- 2012 The 53rd Korea Publishing Culture Awards - The Bath Fairy
- 2013 The 3rd Changwon Children's Literature Award - The Bath Fairy
- 2019 The Picture Book Translation Award and Reader Award in the 24th Japanese Picture Book Awards - Magic Candies
- 2020 The Astrid Lindgren Memorial Award (ALMA)
- 2022 The Boston Globe - Picture Book Honor Books Award - Moon Pop
- 2023 The Winner of the Andersen "Gualtiero Schiaffino" SuperPrize - Magic Candies

== Works ==
In an interview, she said that she thought that picture books should give readers comfort and courage rather than general teaching. This is well reflected in her works.

- 2004 Cloud Bread (Hansol Soobook) ISBN 9788953538610
- 2007 The Boy Who Looked for the North Wind (Sigong Junior) ISBN 9788952750136
- 2007 The Pink Rope (Sigong Junior) ) ISBN 9788952750204
- 2010 Moon Sherbet (Bear Books) ISBN 9791158360832
- 2011 Last Evening (Bear Books) ISBN 9788993242300
- 2011 Peep's Mother (Bear Books) ISBN 9791158360849
- 2012 The Bath Fairy (Bear Books) ISBN 9791158360825
- 2014 The Poop Fly I Tasted in my Dream (Bear Books) ISBN 9788993242300
- 2016 Strange Mother (Bear Books) ISBN 9791158360856
- 2017 Magic Candies (Bear Books) ISBN 9791158361143
- 2018 The Strange Visitor (Bear Books) ISBN 9791158361242
- 2019 I am a Dog (Bear Books) ISBN 9791158361464
- 2022 Yeoni and Mr.Willow (Bear Books) ISBN 9791158362836
- 2024 The Recipe of Magic Candies (Story Bowl) ISBN 9791198610607
- 2024 Happy Birthday (Story Bowl) ISBN 9791198807281

== Collaborations with other authors ==
- 2006 I Really like Rainy Days, written by Eun-gyu Choi (Upright Tree)
- 2006 Let's Play with the Moon, written by Myo-gwang Park (Upright Tree)
- 2006 Our Play and Our Culture in All Seasons, written by Sun-young Lee (Hansol Soobook) * Dak paper doll making ISBN 9788953535671
- 2006 Red Bean Porridge Granny and the Tiger, written by Yun-gyu Park (Sigong Junior) ISBN 9788952745798
