= Daisuke Nishio =

Japanese animator and director (born 1959)

- Born: April 1, 1959 (age 67); Miyoshi, Hiroshima, Japan
- Occupations: Animator, director
- Employer(s): Shueisha, Bird Studio

Daisuke Nishio (西尾 大介, Nishio Daisuke; born April 1, 1959) is a Japanese animator and director. He joined Toei Doga (now Toei Animation) as animator in 1981. After doing several TV series, he was promoted to assistant director on Dr. Slump - Arale-chan in 1982. He debuted as director for Dragon Ball in 1986 and made his film debut that same year with Dragon Ball: The Legend of Shenlong. Nishio also directed its sequel TV series, Dragon Ball Z, and several of its films.

== Filmography ==
=== Director ===
- Dragon Ball: The Legend of Shenlong (1986) - Director
- Dragon Ball: Sleeping Princess in Devil's Castle (1987) - Director
- Dragon Ball (1987-1989) - Series Director, Storyboard, Episode Director
- Crying Freeman: Episode 1 - Portrait of a Killer (1988) - Director
- Dragon Ball Z (1989-1993) - Series Director (#1-199), Storyboard, Episode Director
- Dragon Ball Z: Return My Gohan!! (1989) - Director
- Dragon Ball Z: The World's Strongest (1990) - Director
- Dragon Ball Z: The Ultimate Battle for the Entire Earth (1990) - Director
- 3×3 Eyes (1991) - Director
- Dragon Ball Z: Clash!! The Power of 10 Billion Warriors (1992) - Director
- Aoki Densetsu Shoot! (1993-1994) - Series Director, Storyboard, Episode Director
- GeGeGe no Kitaro (1996-1998) - Series Director, Storyboard, Episode Director
- Kindaichi Case Files (Movie) (1996) - Director
- Kindaichi Case Files (1997-2000) - Series Director, Storyboard, Episode Director
- Kindaichi Case Files: Satsuriku no Deep Blue (1999) - Director
- One Piece: Django's Dance Carnival (2001) - Director
- Interstella 5555: The 5tory of the 5ecret 5tar 5ystem (2003) - Director
- Air Master (2003) - Series Director, Storyboard, Episode Director
- Futari wa Pretty Cure (2004-2005) - Series Director, Storyboard, Episode Director
- Futari wa Pretty Cure Max Heart (2005-2006) - Series Director, Storyboard, Episode Director
- RoboDz Kazagumo Hen (2008) - Series Director, Storyboard, Episode Director
- Halo Legends: Odd One Out (2010) - Director
- Magic Candies (2024) - Director

=== Other ===
- Dr. Slump - Arale-chan (1981-1986) - Storyboard, Episode Director
- Dr. Slump: "Hoyoyo!" Space Adventure (1982) - Assistant Director
- Dr. Slump and Arale-chan: Hoyoyo, Great Round-the-World Race (1983) - Assistant Director
- Patalliro!: Stardust Keikaku (1982) - Assistant Director
- Dragon Ball Z: The Incredible Mightiest vs. Mightiest (1991) - Supervision
- Gulliver Boy (1995) - Storyboard, Episode Director
- One Piece (1999-) - Storyboard, Episode Director
- Powerpuff Girls Z (2006-2007) - Storyboard
