= The Vacation Goo =

1st episode of the 4th season of American Dad

- American Dad! episode
- Episode no.: Season 4 Episode 1
- Directed by: Albert Calleros
- Written by: Josh Bycel; Jonathon Fener
- Production code: 2AJN22
- Original air date: September 30, 2007
- Running time: 21 min

Guest appearance
- Elizabeth Banks as Becky Arangino

Episode chronology
| ← Previous "Joint Custody" | Next → "Meter Made" |
- American Dad! season 4

"The Vacation Goo" is the first episode of the fourth season of the American animated television series American Dad!. It was first broadcast on Fox in the United States on September 30, 2007. In the episode, the discovery that all of the Smith's vacations have been fabricated causes Francine to have an emotional breakdown. The family eventually goes onto a real vacation, where Francine's suspicions get the best of her.

"The Vacation Goo" received mixed reviews from most television critics. According to the Nielson ratings, it was viewed by 6.03 million households during its original airing, and acquired a 3.1 rating in the 18-49 demographic. Elizabeth Banks guest stars as Becky Arangino in the episode.

The episode was directed by Albert Calleros, and written by Josh Bycel and Jonathan Fener.

== Plot ==
When Francine becomes frustrated that the family is falling apart, Stan suggests a vacation. The Smiths have a great time in Maui until Francine, Steve and Hayley wake up to find themselves floating in virtual reality chambers filled with a green, gooey substance. They learn that Stan programs a vacation in the goo chambers every year to escape the family. Hayley and Steve, agreeing with their father, both attempt to use the chambers for themselves. Fed up with the family's fracture, Francine breaks down and gives up. Filled with guilt, the family decides to book a real vacation on a cruise, to which she eventually agrees.

Meanwhile, Roger, who wants to become a famous movie star, lands a part, only to quit when he is unable to cry on cue. He becomes a Myra Hindley impersonator on the same cruise the Smiths are on. When Francine sees everyone acting uncharacteristically enthusiastic, as well as noticing Becky, the attractive event planner, hitting on Steve, she angrily believes she is in the goo chambers again and jumps overboard, expecting to wake up at home. The others, plus Becky, follow her into the sea and rescue her, but realize nobody told the ship to return for them. They land on an island, where they learn that hunters living on the island plan to hunt them down for sport, causing them to take refuge in a cave.

The ship stops in Cuba, where Roger is forced off. He resorts to becoming an exotic dancer at a nearby strip club, but his job nearly becomes prostitution. Distraught by what he's doing, Roger breaks down in tears, to which a heartfelt john gives him money and helps him escape. Back on the island, Becky is crushed to death during a cave-in, driving the Smiths to reluctantly eat her to survive. The hunters then find them, and the family learns that the island—and the hunt—was part of the cruise. Reeling over the fact the ate Becky for nothing, Stan quickly asks where the family wants to go next year. The Smiths then happily float in a hot-air balloon over a vast canyon, holding a toast "to the goo", revealing the family using the goo chambers together.

== Reception ==
"The Vacation Goo" aired on September 30, 2007, as part of the animated television line-up on Fox. It was preceded by The Simpsons, King of the Hill, and its opposite show Family Guy. It was watched by 6.03 million, according to the Nielson ratings, and garnered a 3.1 rating in the 18-49 demographics. This episode was down 32% in total viewership compared to "Camp Refoogee", the previous season premiere of, which was viewed by 8.9 million homes during its original airing.

Genevieve Koski of The A.V. Club gave it a mixed review, writing that she preferred the episode's family-centered storyline to episodes that satirized politics, but criticized the subplot as "weird". She gave the episode a B, the third highest grade of the night, beating out King of the Hill episode "Bobby Rae", but scoring lower than The Simpsons episode "The Homer of Seville" and Family Guy episode "Movin' Out (Brian's Song)".

== See also ==
- Brain in a vat
- Triangle of Sadness
- Send Help
