= The Sky Crawlers (film) =

2008 film by Mamoru Oshii

- Theatrical release poster

Japanese name
- Kanji: スカイ・クロラ
Transcriptions
- Revised Hepburn: Sukai Kurora
- Directed by: Mamoru Oshii
- Screenplay by: Chihiro Itō
- Based on: The Sky Crawlers by Hiroshi Mori
- Produced by: Tomohiko Ishii; Hideyuki Saitō (3DCG Producer)
- Starring: Rinko Kikuchi; Ryo Kase; Shōsuke Tanihara; Chiaki Kuriyama
- Cinematography: Hisashi Ezura
- Edited by: Junichi Uematsu
- Music by: Kenji Kawai
- Production company: Production I.G
- Distributed by: Warner Bros. Pictures
- Release date: August 2, 2008
- Running time: 122 minutes
- Country: Japan
- Languages: Japanese; English
- Box office: $5.8 million

The Sky Crawlers (Japanese: スカイ・クロラ, Hepburn: Sukai Kurora) is a 2008 Japanese animated science fiction war film directed by Mamoru Oshii. It was produced by Production I.G and written by Chihiro Itō, based on Hiroshi Mori's novel series of the same name. The film features character designs by Tetsuya Nishio, music by Kenji Kawai, and a voice cast led by Rinko Kikuchi, Ryo Kase, Shōsuke Tanihara and Chiaki Kuriyama. Combining digitally animated aerial sequences with a restrained visual style, the film represents one of Oshii's most contemplative works following Ghost in the Shell 2: Innocence (2004).

Set in an alternate world where large-scale war has been abolished, the story follows a group of genetically engineered adolescents known as Kildren (キルドレ, Kirudore; "kill-dolls"), who are employed by rival private corporations to fight a perpetual aerial conflict staged for public consumption. A newly assigned pilot arrives at a remote airbase and gradually becomes aware of the cyclical nature of the war and the artificial structure governing the lives of the pilots. The narrative focuses less on military strategy than on the psychological and existential conditions created by a system designed to sustain conflict indefinitely.

The Sky Crawlers was released across Japanese theaters by Warner Bros. on August 2, 2008. The film was distributed internationally through various festival screenings—including in competition at the 65th Venice International Film Festival—and limited theatrical runs, later receiving home media releases in multiple territories. It was accompanied by a range of related media, including the tie-in video game The Sky Crawlers: Innocent Aces and other cross-media promotional projects.

The film received generally positive reviews from critics, who praised its visual realism, sound design, and philosophical tone, though some noted its slow pacing and minimal narrative exposition. The Sky Crawlers won the Mainichi Film Award for Best Animation Film and received nominations for the Golden Lion and for the Japan Academy Film Prize for Animation of the Year. Over time, it has been regarded as a distinctive entry in Oshii's filmography, noted for its exploration of themes such as identity, repetition, memory, emotional detachment, and the social function of controlled conflict within a stable consumer society.

== Plot ==
The Sky Crawlers is set in an alternate history timeline where, although the world is at peace, two rival private corporations—Rostock and Lautern—conduct real aerial combat operations to ease the tension of a population accustomed to war. Their pilots are the Kildren (キルドレ, Kirudore; "kill-dolls"), genetically engineered humanoids who remain physically adolescent and do not age.

Fighter pilot Yūichi Kannami is reassigned to Area 262, where he is given a new aircraft and learns that he has replaced a previous pilot, Kurita Jinroh. The base is commanded by Suito Kusanagi, and Kannami gradually becomes acquainted with the other pilots and the routines of their isolated lives. At a local diner, he meets Fuuko, who reveals that she had a relationship with Jinroh, suggesting that his reassignment follows Jinroh's death. The pilots also speak of a legendary enemy ace known as the Teacher, rumored to be an adult rather than a Kildren.

Kannami later meets Mizuki, who is introduced as Kusanagi's younger sister but is in fact her daughter, highlighting the abnormal passage of time experienced by the Kildren. During ongoing operations, the unit suffers losses, including the death of pilot Yudagawa at the hands of the Teacher. Kusanagi becomes increasingly withdrawn, and her actions suggest a deeper personal connection to both Jinroh and the Teacher.

The pilots are temporarily reassigned to March-Hare base for a large-scale operation that results in heavy casualties. There, pilot Midori Mitsuya begins to question her identity after realizing she has no childhood memories and suggests that Kannami may be Jinroh's successor, retaining elements of his experience. Back at Area 262, a replacement pilot appears who closely resembles the fallen Yudagawa, reinforcing the cyclical nature of the system.

Kusanagi later admits that she killed Jinroh at his request and asks Kannami to kill her as well so that "something might change", but he refuses. As Kannami reflects on the possibility of finding meaning within repetition, he regains memories associated with Jinroh.

During a subsequent patrol, Kannami encounters the Teacher and engages him alone, describing the confrontation as facing a father figure. He is killed in the ensuing dogfight, and the base personnel quietly accept his loss.

In a post-credits scene, a new pilot, Isamu Hiragi, arrives at Area 262. Although his face is not shown, his mannerisms and voice resemble Kannami's. Kusanagi greets him warmly, stating that she has been waiting for his arrival, implying that the cycle of replacement and conflict continues.

== Voice cast ==
Character	Japanese voice actor	English dubbing actor
Yūichi Kannami	Ryō Kase	Michael Sinterniklaas
Suito Kusanagi	Rinko Kikuchi	Stephanie Sheh
Naofumi Tokino	Shōsuke Tanihara	Troy Baker
Midori Mitsuya	Chiaki Kuriyama	
Mizuki Kusanagi	Megumi Yamaguchi	Bryce Hitchcock
Aizu Yudagawa	Daisuke Hirakawa	Doug Erholtz
Yuriyuki Shinota	Takuma Takewaka	
Towa Sasakura	Yoshiko Sakakibara	Mari Devon
Kyoku Yama	Mugihito	
Honda	Hōchū Ōtsuka	
Kusumi	Mako Hyōdō	
Fūko	Mabuki Andō	Kirsten Potter
Yuri	Yuriko Hishimi	
Bus guide	Yukari Nishio	
Master	Naoto Takenaka	Paul St. Peter (mission briefer)

== Production ==
Author Hiroshi Mori initially considered The Sky Crawlers one of the most difficult of his works to adapt for film, and agreed to the project only after learning that Mamoru Oshii would direct it.

Oshii approached the adaptation by emphasizing atmosphere and thematic continuity rather than strictly reproducing the narrative structure of the novels. The film places greater focus on the repetitive daily lives of the pilots and the emotional detachment produced by their condition, reflecting Oshii's long-standing interest in memory, identity, and cyclical existence.

Particular attention was given to the aerial combat sequences, which were created using extensive computer-generated imagery in collaboration with Polygon Pictures. Oshii sought a high level of mechanical realism and restrained movement, aiming to depict air combat with a documentary-like precision rather than stylized action.

== Themes and analysis ==
Scholarly analysis has discussed the film's depiction of engineered adolescence and cyclical conflict as a critique of managed permanence—where war persists as a commodified social function even in an ostensibly peaceful world. One academic study situates the Kildren condition in relation to optimization, repetition, and the erasure of developmental continuity, arguing that the narrative uses adolescence as an imposed, economically functional state rather than a transitional life phase.

== Soundtrack ==
The Sky Crawlers

Soundtrack album by Kenji Kawai
- Released: July 27, 2008
- Label: VAP

A soundtrack album composed by Kenji Kawai was released in Japan in July 2008 through VAP.

1. "Main Theme (Opening)"
2. "First Sortie"
3. "Sail Away (Vocal)"
4. "Foo-Ko"
5. "Main Theme (Memory)"
6. "Mizuki"
7. "Surprise Attack"
8. "Drive-By-Wire"
9. "Main Theme – Affair (Harp)"
10. "Main Theme – Blue Fish (Orgel)"
11. "Private Sortie"
12. "Second Sortie"
13. "Night Sortie"
14. "March Hare"
15. "Adler Tag"
16. "Krakow"
17. "Main Theme (Affair)"
18. "Main Theme (Blue Fish)"
19. "Final Sortie"
20. "Teacher"
21. "Main Theme (Ending)"

The song used in the end credits, "Konya mo Hoshi ni Dakarete", sung by Ayaka, was not included in the soundtrack.

== Release ==
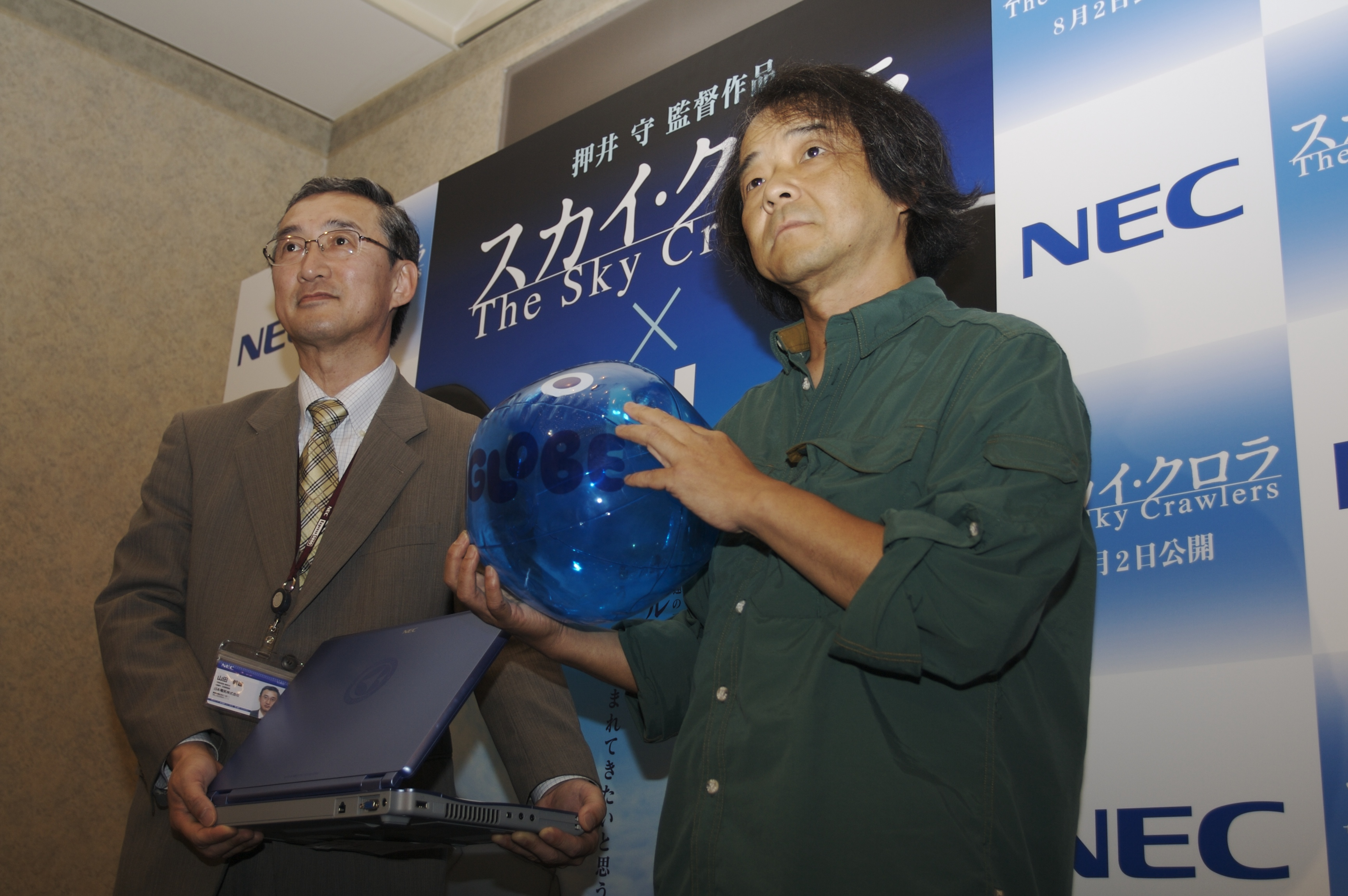
Director Mamoru Oshii (right) promoting the film, 2 June 2008.

The Sky Crawlers was released theatrically in Japan by Warner Bros. on August 2, 2008. It was subsequently distributed internationally by Sony Pictures under their Stage 6 Films label, who initially announced their plans on the film's North American premiere at the 2008 Toronto International Film Festival. They consequently sent this film as their entry for Best Animated Feature at the 81st Academy Awards.

The American release of the film differs from the Japanese release in that the song used during the ending credits of the Japanese version, "Konya mo Hoshi ni Dakarete", by Ayaka, is not used in the American release.

== Reception ==
=== Box office ===
The Sky Crawlers grossed approximately $5.8 million worldwide, with the vast majority of its earnings coming from Japan. The film had only limited theatrical releases internationally and no wide North American run.

=== Critical response ===
The film was an official selection of the 65th Venice International Film Festival, where it won the Future Film Festival Digital Award, and the 2008 Toronto International Film Festival. Later, the film competed officially at the famed Sitges Film Festival, where it won three separate awards: the Jose Luis Guarner Critic Award, Best Original Soundtrack (for Kenji Kawai) and an award given by the Carnet Jove Jury for "the best motion picture for a youth audience." The film was also in the official selection at the Helsinki International Film Festival and Stockholm International Film Festival. The International Press Academy nominated it for Best Animated or Mixed Media Feature. It won Best Animation Film at the 63rd Mainichi Film Awards. Reviewers frequently described the film as a contemplative and introspective work, noting its emphasis on mood, sound design, and atmosphere over conventional narrative progression. While its visual realism and philosophical tone were widely praised, several critics observed that its deliberate pacing and minimal exposition could be challenging for general audiences.

The film received positive reviews from film critics. It holds an 80% approval rating on the review aggregator website Rotten Tomatoes, based on 10 reviews with an average score of 6.86 out of 10. Anime News Network gave the film a B+.

=== Accolades ===
Award ceremony	Date of ceremony	Category	Nominee(s)	Result	Ref.
Venice International Film Festival	September 6, 2008	Golden Lion	Mamoru Oshii	Nominated	
Satellite Awards	December 14, 2008	Best Animated or Mixed Media Feature	The Sky Crawlers	Nominated	
Mainichi Film Awards	February 4, 2009	Best Animation Film	The Sky Crawlers	Won	
Japan Academy Film Prize	February 20, 2009	Animation of the Year	The Sky Crawlers	Nominated	
Japan Academy Film Prize	February 20, 2009	Excellence Prize	The Sky Crawlers	Won	

== Video game ==
A tie-in game for and prequel to the film, The Sky Crawlers: Innocent Aces, was released for the Wii in October 2008 in Japan, before being localized for the Western world in early 2010. Both Mamoru Oshii and Hiroshi Mori were involved in consulting development for the game.
