= Tearjerker (American Dad!) =

- American Dad! episode
- Episode no.: Season 4 Episode 10
- Directed by: Albert Calleros
- Written by: Jonathan Fener
- Production code: 3AJN08
- Original air date: January 13, 2008

Guest appearances
- Don LaFontaine; Seth Green

Episode chronology
← Previous "Frannie 911"	Next → "Oedipal Panties"
- American Dad! season 4

"Tearjerker" is the tenth episode of the fourth season of the animated comedy series American Dad!. It originally aired on Fox in the United States on January 13, 2008. As the episode follows a story based entirely from a James Bond film, each American Dad! character plays a role of another: Stan as Agent Stan Smith, Francine Smith as Sexpun T'Come, Hayley as Miss Peacenickel, Steve as S, Avery Bullock as B, Roger as Tearjerker, Klaus as Tchochkie Schmear, Terry Bates as Mannie, Greg Corbin as Peddie, Chuck White as Professor, and Captain Monty as Gums. This episode follows Agent Stan Smith during his infiltration of a movie set, where he finds Matthew McConaughey to be a robot, as well as Johnny Depp during his visit on Tearjerker's island. Tearjerker, the main antagonist of the episode, is a business tycoon who has been abducting celebrities from his spa and replacing them with robots that will star in his horrible movies. While in the meantime he is pressured to accept a marriage by Sexpun T'Come, Stan goes to stop Tearjerker from premiering his tragedy film in cinemas worldwide, making those who watch it cry to death literally.

The sequel to "Tearjerker", "For Black Eyes Only", aired on Fox on March 10, 2013, as the 13th episode of the ninth season.

"Tearjerker" was written by Jonathon Fener and directed by Albert Calleros. It was met with mostly positive reception from television critics, with much of the praise going into the character development of the antagonist. It features guest appearances from Seth Green and Don LaFontaine, along with several recurring voice actors and actresses for the series.

== Plot ==
Stan's boss, B (Bullock), assigns Stan to infiltrate the set for a film being produced by Tchochkie Schmear (Klaus). Stan investigates one of Tchochkie's movies, Bark of the Covenant. There, he finds Matthew McConaughey working on the set, only to find out he is a robot when Stan exposes him to milk. He also discovers that Schmear was hired by Tearjerker (Roger). Suspicious, Stan arrives at a Monte Carlo casino, where he is introduced to Sexpun T'Come (Francine) and Tearjerker. Stan challenges Tearjerker to play a game in exchange for an invitation to a spa in the Teardrop Islands. Stan declares playing "highest number", in which the players name the highest number they can think of. Stan wins the game. Sexpun gives Tearjerker Stan's stolen wallet, containing his personal CIA information.

En route to Tearjerker's island, Stan meets Johnny Depp, who is later replaced by a robot replica that also malfunctions when given milk. Tearjerker orders Sexpun to seduce Stan, but he proposes marriage to her, and she falls in love with him.

Tearjerker plans to use his film, Oscar Gold, depicting an intellectually disabled alcoholic Jewish boy and his cancer-ridden puppy set during the Holocaust, to make moviegoers cry themselves to death. Stan and Sexpun embark on a boat tour explaining Tearjerker's plan, which ends in Tearjerker's office, where Tearjerker ties the two to a chair with ropes and forces them to watch the film, which simultaneously premieres in theaters worldwide.

With everyone on the verge of crying to death, Sexpun accepts Stan's proposal of marriage. Stan recalls the engagement ring previously given to him by S (Steve). He asks Sexpun to put it on, which causes her breasts to swell, breaking the ropes. Discovering Adrien Brody and Halle Berry in Tearjerker's dungeon, Stan records a video of their celebrity baby and posts it on the Internet, redirecting the moviegoers' attention from the film. Tearjerker unleashes his soldiers to kill Stan, though they end up plummeting through the poorly constructed floor. Tearjerker attempts to flee in an escape pod, but it malfunctions and falls into a volcano. After Stan and Sexpun are married, Tearjerker's hand briefly rises from the lava pit, but then falls back in.

== Reception ==
"Tearjerker" was met with mostly positive reception from most television critics. In a simultaneous review with Family Guy, Genevieve Koski of The A.V. Club gave it a mixed review, going on to write, "I wasn't wild about tonight's "Tearjerker", though I did appreciate that it tweaked the Bond conventions into an original story rather than doing a straight-up recreation. It seems so easy to do a Bond parody, especially when your main character is a CIA agent." However, she went on to praise the Tearjerker character portrayed by Roger, writing, "The most obvious inspiration–Roger as the arch-villain–was also the funniest. Sure, "Sexpun DeCome" and "Peacenickel" were chuckle-worthy throwaways, but Roger's–excuse me, "Tearjerker's"–plan to create the world's saddest movie [...] being foiled by Mike, the world's worst contractor, provided for some nice Roger tantrums [...]." She went on to give the episode a C+, the highest grade of the night, scoring higher than the Family Guy episode "McStroke". Donald Campbell of U-Wire gave the episode a four out of five stars, going on to write, "Seth MacFarlane has brought laughter to quite a few Americans - most of them under the age of 30 - with his two series, Family Guy and American Dad".

== See also ==
- Don, the film, whose theme is sampled in this episode
- A Kitten for Hitler, a real film with a similar plot to the fictional one depicted in this episode
- "The Tears of a Clown", the 1979 song by The Beat which two characters dance to in this episode
