= American Dad! season 4 =

American Dad!
- Season 4
- DVD box art for American Dad! Volume 4
- Starring: Seth MacFarlane; Wendy Schaal; Scott Grimes; Rachael MacFarlane; Dee Bradley Baker
- No. of episodes: 16

Release
- Original network: Fox
- Original release: September 30, 2007 – May 18, 2008

Season chronology
- ← Previous; Season 3 Next → Season 5

The fourth season of the American TV series American Dad! originally aired on Fox from September 30, 2007, to May 18, 2008, and consisted of sixteen episodes.

The first half of the season is included within the Volume Three DVD box set, which was released on April 15, 2008, and the second half is included within the Volume Four DVD box set, which was released on April 28, 2009. The fourth season consisted of one 2AJNxx holdover episode while the remaining episodes of the season were from 3AJNxx production line.

This is the final season that composer Ron Jones worked for the score before leaving the show to work on the music for Family Guy until season 12. He was later replaced by Joel McNeely, who frequently collaborated with Seth MacFarlane and has worked on the series' musical score, along with Walter Murphy, ever since.

Because of the 2007–2008 Writers Guild of America strike, there was a shortage of episodes in this season. Much like season 6 of Family Guy, the episodes that were shown during the WGA strike were done so without permission from Seth MacFarlane, since MacFarlane showed support for the writers by not finishing any planned episodes until the strike ended.

== Episodes ==
| No. overall | No. in season | Title | Directed by | Written by | Original release date | Prod. code | U.S. viewers (millions) |
|---|---|---|---|---|---|---|---|
| 43 | 1 | "The Vacation Goo" | Albert Calleros | Josh Bycel & Jonathan Fener | September 30, 2007 | 2AJN22 | 6.07 |
When Francine discovers that all of their family vacations have been virtual reality simulations created by the CIA so that Stan could ditch the family, she demands a real vacation. Meanwhile, Roger makes a desperate effort to cry on cue.
| 44 | 2 | "Meter Made" | Bob Bowen | Dan Vebber | October 7, 2007 | 3AJN01 | 6.29 |
During an attempt to gain respect and be a "somebody", Stan finds himself becoming a meter maid after assaulting one, and stealing parking meter money to live the good life. Meanwhile, Hayley poses nude for a life drawing class to prove that women should not be ashamed of their nudity — until she discovered that Roger is in the life drawing class Hayley is posing for and Steve is using Roger's painting as a masturbatory aid. The episode contains numerous plot references to the film Goodfellas and has guest appearances by Forest Whitaker and Molly Shannon.
| 45 | 3 | "Dope & Faith" | Caleb Meurer | Michael Shipley | October 14, 2007 | 3AJN02 | 6.20 |
When Stan realizes he has no friends, he prays to God for one -- only to find that his new pal is atheist. Meanwhile, Roger plays on Steve's current obsession with Harry Potter and tricks him into believing that he has been accepted at Hogwarts -- and gets him involved with methamphetamine dealers.
| 46 | 4 | "Big Trouble in Little Langley" | John Aoshima | Rick Wiener & Kenny Schwartz | November 4, 2007 | 3AJN03 | 7.08 |
When Francine's foster parents become a nuisance, Stan sets out to find Francine's biological parents, whom he loves more... until he finds out they abandoned their daughter and leave him trapped in his burning house. Stan gains an appreciation for the Lings after Francine's foster father rescues him. Meanwhile, Steve lives like a daredevil so he can score with the class hottie.
| 47 | 5 | "Haylias" | Brent Woods | David Zuckerman | November 11, 2007 | 3AJN04 | 7.77 |
When Hayley wakes up from a nightmare involving herself being brainwashed at school as a child, she decides to move to France and live a sexually liberated lifestyle forcing Stan to shout Hayley's trigger phrase, brainwashing her into being the obedient daughter he always wanted, until she goes on a rampage and intent on killing Stan.
| 48 | 6 | "The 42-Year-Old Virgin" | Pam Cooke | Nahnatchka Khan | November 18, 2007 | 3AJN05 | 8.12 |
At a poker game with Ray and Larry (guest voices Victor Raider-Wexler and Don Lake), Stan reveals that he is a virgin -- when it comes to killing someone, which makes Steve hate him, Francine lose sexual interest in him, and Hayley love him. Meanwhile, a pedophile who was recently fired from the water park befriends Steve, Snot, Toshi, and Barry.
| 49 | 7 | "Surro-Gate" | Tim Parsons | Erik Durbin | December 2, 2007 | 3AJN07 | 6.48 |
Francine decides to be a surrogate, against Stan's wishes, for her gay neighbors Terry and Greg, but Stan kidnaps the baby in order to give it a better life, away from gay people. Meanwhile, after Klaus swears horrible revenge on Steve and Roger after throwing him down a water park slide, the two become reclusive and hide in the attic.
| 50 | 8 | "The Most Adequate Christmas Ever" | John Aoshima | Jim Bernstein | December 16, 2007 | 3AJN12 | 7.16 |
Stan dies during his quest to find the perfect Christmas tree and arrives in Limbo where he learns his family's lives are threatened, so he goes to desperate measures to return to Earth and receive a second chance at life.
| 51 | 9 | "Frannie 911" | Joe Daniello | Brian Boyle | January 6, 2008 | 3AJN06 | 5.19 |
Francine tries to show Roger that Stan still loves him by faking his kidnapping. But when Roger acts up (and Stan reveals that he knew about the plan all along because they have caller ID), she forces him to act nice, only for the Smiths to discover that there is a reason why Roger is a ne'er-do-well all the time. Meanwhile, Steve practices becoming a backup dancer while Hayley and Klaus play "Truth or Dare."
| 52 | 10 | "Tearjerker" | Albert Calleros | Jonathan Fener | January 13, 2008 | 3AJN08 | 8.62 |
In this James Bond parody, Stan plays a 007-type secret agent sent to stop the diabolical Tearjerker (played by Roger) from fulfilling his master plan to create a movie so sad that it causes anyone who watches it to cry themselves to death.
| 53 | 11 | "Oedipal Panties" | Rodney Clouden | David Hemingson | January 27, 2008 | 3AJN09 | 6.16 |
Feeling threatened by Stan's mother, to whom Stan is once again giving support with her failing relationships, Francine seeks to loosen the umbilical cord and find out what goes wrong with her boyfriends. Meanwhile, Steve accidentally catches the ich from Klaus.
| 54 | 12 | "Widowmaker" | Bob Bowen | Keith Heisler | February 17, 2008 | 3AJN10 | 5.35 |
Francine pushes Stan to open up to her emotionally but, after a few psychiatrist sessions with Roger, he is more touchy-feely than she can handle when he tells her he killed her friend's husband. Meanwhile, Steve vows vengeance when Hayley kills the queen bee from his science project.
| 55 | 13 | "Red October Sky" | Caleb Meurer | Steve Hely | April 27, 2008 | 3AJN11 | 6.76 |
Stan is assigned to track down a former KGB agent, eventually discovering that the man is his new next-door neighbor and is trying to turn Steve into a Communist. Meanwhile, Roger and Klaus head to Europe for a little R & R.
| 56 | 14 | "Office Spaceman" | Brent Woods | Laura McCreary | May 4, 2008 | 3AJN13 | 6.28 |
When the CIA initiates an Alien Task Force, a peculiar twist of fate puts Roger in charge of the task force in disguise, who marks Stan as an alien to protect his own identity. Meanwhile, Francine freaks out when she finds Steve with a black girl as his study-buddy, but reveals that she did not freak out because Steve's study-buddy is black, but because she is left-handed.
| 57 | 15 | "Stanny Slickers II: The Legend of Ollie's Gold" | Pam Cooke | Erik Sommers | May 11, 2008 | 3AJN14 | 5.67 |
After officially dying and coming back to life, Stan decides to leave a legacy on the world and begins to search for legendary buried treasure. As the search for gold goes "North", life at home heads south as Hayley becomes addicted to body-piercing, Steve turns the vacuum into a robotic girlfriend, and Roger hatches a scam to get sexually harassed at work so he can win an out-of-court settlement. Cornel North is depicted as a protector of the free word, someone who fights communists to protect American values. This patriotic image is not typical of someone who was convicted of impeding justice.
| 58 | 16 | "Spring Breakup" | Albert Calleros | Nahnatchka Khan | May 18, 2008 | 3AJN17 | 5.64 |
Stan has a spring break-induced mid-life crisis. With Francine away visiting her parents, Roger (as "Scotch Bingington") invites Spring Breakers to party at the Smith household. But Stan nearly has a "Spring Breakdown" when he falls prey to a sexy booze-cruiser and Steve tries to lose his virginity to actress Carmen Selectra.: Note: This would be the final episode of the series to use the original opening, a new opening would replace it in Season 5.

== Reception ==
The season was nominated for a Teen Choice Award.

Reviews were mostly positive.
