= Hisayuki Toriumi =

Japanese screenwriter

- Born: July 9, 1941; Isehara, Kanagawa Prefecture, Japan
- Died: January 23, 2009 (aged 67)
- Other names: Eiko Toriumi; Aohiko Umidori
- Occupations: Director, screenwriter, novelist
- Employer(s): Tatsunoko Production, Studio Pierrot
- Known for: Science Ninja Team Gatchaman franchise
- Spouse: Hiroko

Hisayuki Toriumi (鳥海 永行, Toriumi Hisayuki; July 9, 1941 – January 23, 2009), sometimes credited as Eikō Toriumi, was a Japanese animation director, storyboardist, screenwriter, and novelist.

He is best known for directing the TV show Science Ninja Team Gatchaman and also credited for his contributions to several other Tatsunoko Production anime series. He is known to Japanese fans for his TV series The Wonderful Adventures of Nils and Shima Shima Tora no Shimajirō and to international fans for his work in Area 88, Dallos, The Mysterious Cities of Gold, and Tekkaman: The Space Knight.

After leaving Tatsunoko, he also became a prolific novelist from the 1980s onward. His representative work is the Kyūkei no Figurido series, which depicts the adventures and revenge of a man of Murakami Suigun who becomes a battle slave in Europe, where he arrives due to the betrayal of his comrades, set in England and France during the Hundred Years' War and in Japan during the Northern and Southern Courts.

== Style ==
Toriumi's direction is very smart, dramatic, and complete. Mamoru Oshii was strongly influenced by him, and Oshii professes him to be "my mentor".According to Oshii, he always dealt with family as a theme in his work, and the relationship between father and son was especially important to him. On the other hand, he had no interested in dramas between men and women.

Toriumi also authored nearly two dozen novels. In addition to anime novelizations, he wrote mainly historically-themed novels based on Otogi-zōshi and Yomihon set in Japan from ancient times to the Middle Ages.

== Biography ==
Toriumi was born in Isehara, Kanagawa Pref., Japan, and graduated from the Department of Political Science, Faculty of Law, Chuo University.After attending a screenwriting institute while in college with an interest in filmmaking, he joined Tatsunoko Productions in 1966.

Toriumi was selected as the series director for the TV series Science Ninja Team Gatchaman in 1972, and went on to direct other Tatsunoko TV series in the 1970s including Tekkaman: The Space Knight and Hurricane Polymar. He was then asked to direct a sequel to "Gatchaman," but he did not accept because the story was already complete in his mind and he had nothing further to do.

In December 1978, Toriumi left Tatsunoko. Shocked by the death of the first president, Tatsuo Yoshida, and concerned about his own future at Tatsunoko, he decided to become a freelancer and take on work for other studios. After working at Sunrise, he joined Yuji Nunokawa, who had quit Tatsunoko earlier, and became one of the founding members of Studio Pierrot. There, he worked on series such as The Wonderful Adventures of Nils and The Mysterious Cities of Gold. In The Wonderful Adventures of Nils, Mamoru Oshii, who transferred from Tatsunoko to Pierrot after apply to be his apprentice, also participated as one of the episode directors. However, in the following The Mysterious Cities of Gold, Oshii, who was scheduled to be an assistant director, was approached by President Nunokawa to direct Urusei Yatsura, and, prepared to be excommunicated, accepted the offer without telling Toriumi and dropped out.

Toriumi worked with his protégé, director Mamoru Oshii, on 1983's Dallos, the first original video animation (OVA) ever released.

Later, he left Studio Pierrot and became a freelancer again.

In 1990, he served as general director for the TV movie "Like the Clouds, Like the Wind," which featured character designer and animation director Katsuya Kondō and many other elite Studio Ghibli staff at the time.

In his later years, he worked mainly on the children's programme Shima Shima Tora no Shimajirō.

He died of heart failure on January 23, 2009, at the age of 67.

== Filmography ==
Year	Title	Medium	Roll	Animation studio	Notes	
1967–1968	Speed Racer	TV series	Episode director	Tatsunoko Production		
1967–1968	Oraa Guzura Dado	TV series	Episode director, scriptwriter	Tatsunoko Production		
1968–1969	Dokachin the Primitive Boy	TV series	Episode director	Tatsunoko Production		
1969	Judo Boy	TV series	Episode director	Tatsunoko Production		
1970–1971	The Adventures of Hutch the Honeybee	TV series	Episode director	Tatsunoko Production		
1971	Animated Documentary Decision	TV series	Episode director	Tatsunoko Production		
1972	Pinocchio: The Series	TV series	Episode director	Tatsunoko Production		
1972–1974	Science Ninja Team Gatchaman	TV series	Series director, planner, screenwriter, episode director	Tatsunoko Production		
1974–1975	Hurricane Polymar	TV series	Series director, planner, screenwriter, episode director	Tatsunoko Production		
1975	Tekkaman: The Space Knight	TV series	Series director (episode 14 to 26), planner, screenwriter, episode director	Tatsunoko Production		
1976	Goliath the Super Fighter	TV series	Series director, planner, screenwriter, episode director	Tatsunoko Production		
1977–1978	Mechander Robo	TV series	Screenwriter	Wako Production	Credited as Aohiko Umidori.	
1978	Science Ninja Team Gatchaman: The Movie	Feature film	Director	Tatsunoko Production	Digest of the TV series.	
1976–1977	Paul's Miraculous Adventure	TV series	Episode director	Tatsunoko Production		
1978–1979	Gatchaman II	TV series	Planner	Tatsunoko Production		
1979–1980	Gatchaman Fighter	TV series	Planner	Tatsunoko Production		
1979–1980	The Ultraman	TV series	Chief director (episode 1 to 13), storyboard	Sunrise	He left the program midway through. (Note: Other staff and some Sunrise employees also left the program at the same time, but the reason was not disclosed.)	
1980–1981	The Wonderful Adventures of Nils	TV series	Chief director, episode director	Studio Pierrot		
1980–1981	Space Warrior Baldios	TV series	Screenwriter	Ashi Production, Kokusai Eiga-sha		
	Full Moon Legend Indra	Television pilot	Original story		Only a pilot was produced. Toriumi wrote a novel based on it.	
1981	Space Warrior Baldios the Movie	Feature film	General director	Ashi Production, Kokusai Eiga-sha	The first half is a digest version of the TV series; the second half is an unaired episode on TV.	
1982–1983	The Mysterious Cities of Gold	TV series	Series director, animation production, storyboard, episode director	Studio Pierrot, DIC Audiovisuel		
1983	The Wonderful Adventures of Nils the Movie	Feature film	Director	Studio Pierrot	The film was not released theatrically at the time of its completion, but was screened for the first time in January 2015 at Uplink Shibuya in Tokyo.	
1983–1985	Dallos	OVA	Original story, director, (Note: He did not appear in the credits, but actually co-directed with Mamoru Oshii.) screenwriter, episode director	Studio Pierrot		Toriumi was in charge of episodes with a lot of drama, while Oshii was in charge of episodes with a lot of fight scenes.
1984–1985	Bismark	TV series	Planner	Studio Pierrot		
1985–1986	Ninja Senshi Tobikage	TV series	Storyboard	Studio Pierrot		
1985–1986	Area 88	OVA	Director	Studio Pierrot		
1986	Bari Bari Densetsu	OVA	Supervisor	Studio Pierrot		
1987	Lily C.A.T.	OVA	Original story, director	Studio Pierrot		
1988–1989	Salamander	OVA	Director	Studio Pierrot		
1989	Baoh	OVA	Supervisor, storyboard	Studio Pierrot		
1990	Like the Clouds, Like the Wind	Television film	General director	Studio Pierrot		Based on the novel Kōkyū Shōsetsu (Inner palace Novel), which won the Grand Prize at the 1st Japan Fantasy Novel Award, the debut novel by Ken'ichi Sakemi.
1991	Shinzan Gensōtan (Yumemakura Baku Twilight Gekijō)	OVA	Coordinator	Studio Pierrot		
1991	Michitekuru Toki no Mukō ni	Television film	Director	Studio Pierrot		Based on the novel Rakuen (Paradise), which won the Excellence Award at the 2nd Japan Fantasy Novel Award, the debut novel by Koji Suzuki, known for his Ring series.
1991–1993	Sohryuden: Legend of the Dragon Kings	OVA	Director (episode 7 to 9), storyboard	Kitty Films		
1993–2008	Shima Shima Tora no Shimajirō	TV series	Series director, series composition	Studio Signpost		
1998	Pinka to Umi no Otomodachi	TV series	Director	T Factory		
1999	Cybuster	TV series	Supervisor	Ashi Production		
2001	Kaze no Yojimbo	TV series	Story advisor, scriptwriter	Studio Pierrot		
2008–2009	Hakken Taiken Daisuki! Shimajirō	TV series	Series director, series composition (Note: Live-action parts were added to Shimajirō's new series, but he only worked on the animation parts.)	Studio Signpost	Last work.	
