= Sohryuden: Legend of the Dragon Kings =

Japanese novel series by Yoshiki Tanaka

- Cover of the first novel of Sohryuden

創竜伝 (Sōryūden)
- Novel series
- Written by: Yoshiki Tanaka
- Illustrated by: Yoshitaka Amano (Novels); Clamp (Bunko)
- Published by: Kodansha
- Original run: August 5, 1987 – present
- Volumes: 15
- Original video animation
- Directed by: Osamu Dezaki (#1–3); Norio Kashima (#4–6); Hisayuki Toriumi (#7–9); Kyōsuke Mikuriya (#10–12)
- Produced by: Yoshimasa Mizuo; Kōichi Uchida; Masatoshi Tahara
- Written by: Akinori Endō
- Music by: Hiroyuki Nanba
- Studio: Kitty Film Mitaka Studio
- Licensed by: NA: Central Park Media (expired); UK: Manga Entertainment
- Released: December 21, 1991 – February 19, 1993
- Runtime: 46–48 minutes
- Episodes: 12
- Manga

Suito no Yonkyōdai Sōryūden Gaiden
- Written by: Clamp
- Published by: Kadokawa Shoten
- Magazine: Monthly Mystery DX
- Original run: February 1994 – April 1994
- Manga
- Written by: Kōji Megumi
- Published by: Kodansha
- Magazine: Magazine Special
- Original run: May 19, 2004 – December 20, 2005
- Volumes: 5

Sohryuden: Legend of the Dragon Kings (Japanese: 創竜伝, Hepburn: Sōryūden) is a Japanese novel series written by Yoshiki Tanaka. It is loosely based on Chinese mythology.

It was written by Tanaka in collaboration with illustrators Yoshitaka Amano (Kodansha Novels edition) and manga artist group Clamp (Kodansha bunkobon). It is written with a humorous and satirical tone. It published the 15th volume as of 2020.

On July 24, 2008, at San Diego Comic-Con, North American publisher Del Rey announced that they have secured the license to the Sohryuden novel series. This would have been the first work by Yoshiki Tanaka to be released in English. This was projected to be released in 2009, but was seen on online bookstores as having a 2011 release date. Due to the closure of Del Rey, the release has been cancelled.

== Story ==
The story features four divine Dragon Kings, rulers of the four parts of the world according to Chinese myths. The brothers are reborn in the modern world, complete with supernatural powers and the ability to become the Dragons which are their true forms. They are content to live ordinary lives as long as nobody meddles with them.

It becomes the mission of the four brothers to defeat the "Four Sisters", organization headed by four tycoons from America connected with the "Bulls" - enemies of the Dragons who have received ownership of the Western half of the world while the Dragons keep rule over the Eastern half of the world - before they use their control over technology and the economy to take over the world. However, as this battle begins, the four brothers must also find their place in the world as they flee from the destructive will of the "Bulls".

== Anime ==
The contents to the 1st through the 6th volumes of an original novel serve as a base for the animation.

Sohryuden has been released as a 12 episode animated series. Each episode is about 45 minutes. In the U.S., Central Park Media has released all of the series on both VHS and DVD. The new releases came out November 22, 2005.

The anime was also released in the UK and Australia under the title of The Legend of the Four Kings by Manga Entertainment across six videos. The series was only released on VHS and is now long out of print.

== Manga ==
The Clamp version was serialized as Mystery DX of Kadokawa Shoten in 1994. Intended to be a comedy, Owaru, one of the Dragon Kings, goes to Osaka to wakes snakes up. There are only three stories, and the story has not been concluded. As research, Clamp went to Osaka. The manga version by Clamp is quite rare and had been previously very difficult to obtain. Because of high demand from fans, the chapters have been compiled into a tankōbon format artbook under the title Sohryuden Genga-shu in 2004. Additionally, there is a manga short (only 4 pages) drawn for the Sohryuden drama CD, which had been included in Sohryuden Genga-shu.

In 2004–2005, manga artist Kōji Megumi (恵 広史) serialized another manga version of Sohryuden as a comedy starring Owaru. Serialized in Magazine Special of Kodansha, it is Koji's debut work and has received positive reception and reviews. It was compiled into five volumes.

== Characters ==
Hajime Ryudo (竜堂 始, Ryūdō Hajime) (Blue Dragon of the East)
Voiced by: Hideyuki Hori (Anime), Shō Hayami (Drama CD 1), Mitsuru Miyamoto (Drama CD 2) (Japanese); Dan Green (CPM dub), Jeff Harding (Manga UK dub) (English)
At 23, Hajime is the oldest of the four brothers and since the death of his parents and his grandfather, he is the guardian of the family. Extremely intelligent, Hajime taught History at Kyowa College but lost his directorship because of his uncle, Seichiro Toba. Generally, Hajime is very compassionate and will only lose his temper when he needs to - mainly when his family is threatened. Hajime is the strongest of the brothers and his fighting skills are exemplary. He has a close bond with all his brothers - enjoying the company of Tsuzuku, acting as a mentor to Owaru and being very protective of Amaru. Hajime is the Blue Dragon King of the East and controls the force of gravity in his dragon form.

Tsuzuku Ryudo (竜堂 続, Ryūdō Tsuzuku) (Red Dragon of the South)
Voiced by: Nobuo Tobita (Anime), Ryotaro Okiayu (Drama CD) (Japanese); Walter Barnes (CPM dub), Alan Healy (Manga UK dub) (English)
The second brother at 19 years old. Tsuzuku is often seen as the pretty boy of the four brothers as he always attracts female attention, especially when he is at college. That said, he tends to be very humble about this. Well mannered, polite, and insightful, Tsuzuku keeps his attacks to irony and sarcasm and will only fight when absolutely necessary and has an impressive array of attacks at his disposal when unleashed. He also comes up with plans to help his brothers out of tight situations. He is very close to Hajime and often shares advice with him on numerous topics. He often enjoys banter with Owaru and is also protective of Amaru. He is the Red Dragon King of the South and, in his dragon form, controls fire (electro-magnetic and nuclear energy).

Owaru Ryudo (竜堂 終, Ryūdō Owaru) (White Dragon of the West)
Voiced by: Daiki Nakamura (Anime), Hideo Ishikawa (Drama CD) (Japanese); James Wolfe (CPM dub), Alex McSweeney (Manga UK dub) (English)
The third brother at 15 years old. Owaru is the most energetic out of the brothers. He has a huge appetite and, in contrast to Tsuzuku, can never shy away from a good fight. Despite his rather confident and brash exterior as well as showing a disdain for college work, Owaru is a gifted student at Kyowa College. He sometimes displays signs of carelessness that often earns a lecture mainly from Hajime. He is the one most likely to engage in combat out of all the brothers and his athleticism and superb fighting skills always ensure that he comes out on top. Owaru often sees Hajime as a sort of father figure, given that he is the one he called for when he was in danger. He indulges in banter with Tsuzuku while he acts as a guardian to Amaru, more so than his brothers. He is the White Dragon King of the West which governs the air (wind and sound, as vibration of air).

Amaru Ryudo (竜堂 余, Ryūdō Amaru) (Black Dragon of the North)
Voiced by: Kappei Yamaguchi (Anime), Hikaru Midorikawa (Drama CD 1), Akira Ishida (Drama CD 2) (Japanese); Curt Gebhart (CPM dub), Paul Bailey (Manga UK dub) (English)
At 13, Amaru is the youngest of the four brothers and appears to be the most vulnerable - in reality has astonishing powers. These powers aid the four brothers, especially when they are in human form. He is very gentle and caring and sometimes displays maturity beyond his years - more so than Owaru. That said, he looks up to Owaru as he always seems to get involved with everything Owaru does. His relationships with Tsuzuku and Hajime is usually based on him looking to them for guidance. Amaru rarely displays fighting tendencies but as the episodes go on, he shows us more of his skills. Amaru is prone to having dragon dreams from time to time and often has them prophesied by Hajime. Because of his youth he is more in touch with his dragon powers as he can't control it as well as his brothers. He is the Black Dragon King of the North which controls the water (and lightning).

Matsuri Toba (鳥羽 茉理, Toba Matsuri)
Voiced by: Sakiko Tamagawa (Anime), Yuko Mizutani (Drama CD 1), Naoko Matsui (Drama CD 2) (Japanese); Jessica Calvello (CPM dub), Toni Barry (Manga UK dub) (English)
Matsuri is 18 years old and the cousin of the Ryudo family. She is greatly adored by all the Ryudos and she often adds a female touch to their household, cooking their meals and cleaning up their mess. She seems to have an extreme soft spot for Hajime, often hinting at a relationship between the two, though the two never step over the boundaries of morality. She enjoys the company of Tsuzuku and acts as a mother figure to both Owaru and Amaru. In return, all the Ryudos are very protective of her. Her father is Seichiro Toba, the self-centered and greedy head of education at Kyowa college and Matsuri is extremely contemptuous of him.

Seiichiro Toba (鳥羽 靖一郎, Toba Seiichirō)
Voiced by: Shin Aomori (Anime), Ikuya Sawaki (Drama CD 2) (Japanese); Wayne Grayson (CPM dub), Blair Fairman (Manga UK dub) (English)
Seichiro is the father of Matsuri Toba, the uncle of the four Ryudo brothers, and the headmaster of the Kyowa Institute founded by Tsukasa Ryudo. Seichiro is driven by financial gain and wants to become head of all education in Tokyo and will stoop to any level to achieve it, even deceiving his own family. Matsuri is extremely embarrassed and contemptuous of him while, not surprisingly, he is disliked greatly by all of the Ryudo brothers despite being their uncle.

Saeko Toba (鳥羽 冴子, Toba Saeko)
Voiced by: Rihoko Yoshida (Anime), Atsuko Tanaka (Drama CD 2) (Japanese); Ami Shkula (CPM dub) (English)
Saeko is Matsuri's mother and the long-suffering wife of Seichiro. She is the daughter of Tsukasa Ryudo, the Ryudo brothers' grandfather, making her the aunt of the Ryudo brothers. A director at the college, it is implied that Seichiro may have married her so that he could become the headmaster of Kyowa College. The Ryudo brothers are very fond of her and show her far more respect than their uncle.

Tadayoshi Funazu (船津 忠厳, Funazu Tadayoshi)
Voiced by: Chikao Ōtsuka (Anime), Oki Tamio (Drama CD 2) (Japanese); D.M. Moreland (1st, CPM dub), Jon Avner (2nd, CPM dub) (English)
Known as "Gozen of Kamakura (鎌倉の御前, Kamakura no Gozen)", Funazu is an elderly man in his 90s with huge influence in the political world and the first major foe of the Ryudo brothers. He had known their grandfather for a long time and he became aware of his dragon powers. They both ventured to the Dragon Village known as Ryosenkyu (Dragon Springs) and while there, Funazu killed and drank the blood of a woman who resided there. He noticed a change in his system where he was immune to many weapons such as knives and bullets so he extracted the rest of the blood and had it injected into him over a period of time, expanding his lifespan. His presence in Japan meant that he was able to keep the Four Sisters corporation from influencing the Japanese government. He battles the brothers, where the Japanese army provoke the Dragon Kings.

Patricia Cecile Lansdale (パトリシア・セシル・ランズデール, Patorishia Seshiru Ranzudaaru)/Lady L (レディL, Redi L)
Voiced by: Keiko Toda (Anime), Saeko Shimazu (Drama CD 2) (Japanese); Vibe Jones (CPM dub) (English)
Lady L is a secret agent of the Four Sisters corporation and a representative of the Mulligan Foundation, which is part of it. The Four Sisters corporation is an organization, which influences how governments in all nations are run. They tried to take over the Japanese government in the past but they were prevented by Gozen of Kamakura. She is American by birth but has Japanese blood in her, which she greatly detests. Her Chinese grandmother was raped by a Japanese soldier and her mother was born but they both were not accepted by Japanese society as they were of mixed heritage and were shipped out to America where her mother met an American man. As a result, Lady L decided to try and use the Ryudo brothers' dragon abilities to destroy Japan as the dragon represented 'good' in Japan. She is responsible for the transformations of Hajime, Tsuzuku and Owaru into their dragon forms.

Shuhei Furuta (古田 重平, Furuta Shūhei)
The 54-year-old MP of the Conservative Party who dies in a car accident.

Kengo Takabayashi (高林 健吾, Takabayashi Kengo)
A 53-year-old secretary of the government.

Hatsushi Tamozawa (田母沢 篤, Tamozawa Hatsushi)
A sadistic surgeon who specializes in live dissection. He was Gozen of Kamakura's personal physician and would keep samples of his blood, believing it to be linked with the blood of the Ryudo brothers. He was a surgeon during the last war for the Canton Army and dissected over 80 prisoners. He was also responsible for Tsukasa Ryudo, the brother's grandfather, becoming ill for the rest of his life after catching Typhus Bacteria from a cloth that Tamozawa gave to Gozen. He often clashes with Lady L, as she tries to assert the Four Sisters' influence over Japan, clashing with his desire for a scientific breakthrough regarding the Ryudos.

== Episodes ==
Sohryuden was animated in 12 episodes. The titles displayed are the U.K. version while the Japanese version titles are in brackets.

=== List of episodes ===
No.	English version title / Translated title	Directed by	Written by	Original release date
1	"Dragon Prophecy"; Transliteration: "The Four Brothers Under Fire" (Japanese: 狙われた四兄弟)	Osamu Dezaki	Akinori Endo	June 25, 1991
Day-to-day life for Hajime Ryudo and his brothers is suddenly disrupted by kidnappings, assault and expulsion threats. As the eldest, Hajime realises that the prophecy of the Dragon King will soon become reality.
2	"Ancient Truths"; Transliteration: "The Legend of Dragon Springs" (Japanese: 竜泉郷の伝説)	Osamu Dezaki	Shōji Tonoike	August 20, 1991
Hajime comes face to face with the oppressive tyrant, Gozen of Kamakura, and learns of the ancient legend of the four kings. Offered a chance of complete supremacy over the city of Tokyo, Hajime must take a tough decision - one that could alter the brothers' whole existence.
3	"The Awakening"; Transliteration: "The Black Dragon King Revealed" (Japanese: 黒竜王顕現)	Osamu Dezaki	Satoru Akahori	October 25, 1991
The Ryudo brothers, accused of murder, flee the city and fall straight into Gozen's trap. The Army, together with Gozen, launch a mass attack on the unsuspecting brothers to stimulate their transformation into dragons and use their powers to fuel Gozen's strength.
4	"The Masked Enemy"; Transliteration: "Tokyo Bay Rhapsody" (Japanese: 東京湾狂騒曲)	Norio Kashima	Naruhisa Arakawa	January 25, 1992
More than just fun and games are in store when the Ryudo brothers take a day trip to Tokyo Fairyland. They soon discover that they are wanted by Military Intelligence for their hidden powers and true ghost train horrors come to life when they are pursued through the fairground.
5	"Programmed To Kill"; Transliteration: "The Graceful Agent" (Japanese: 華麗なる代理人)	Norio Kashima	Akinori Endo	March 31, 1992
Dr Hatushi Tamozawa, Gozen of Kamakura's personal physician, thrives on dissecting human beings. Aware of the Ryudo brothers supernatural powers, he is obsessed with experimenting on them and sets out to capture them with his cybernetic hunting dogs. When the two youngest brothers, Owaru and Amaru, suspiciously win VIP tickets to the big league game, the evil doctor lures them into his cunning trap.
6	"Dragon Alliance"; Transliteration: "Skyscrapers and the Red Dragon" (Japanese: 摩天楼の紅竜王)	Norio Kashima	Seiko Watanabe	June 30, 1992
The beautiful mysterious megalomanic Lady L, an extremely influential figure in Japan, will do anything to achieve world domination. Recognising the powers of the Ryudo brothers, she targets Tsuzuku, desperate to reach his inner soul and use his power to achieve her goal. Her proposition angers him and when the situation escalates, drives him to do exactly what frightens him most...
7	"Kill the Dragon"; Transliteration: "Revenge of the Four Brothers" (Japanese: 四兄弟の逆襲)	Hisayuki Toriumi	Satoru Akahori	August 30, 1992
The media world is fascinated by the phenomenon of the Red Dragon which has attacked the cityscape. Unknown to them, the enraged monster is the transformed Tsuzuku Ryudo. The evil Dr Tamozawa is one of the few to have discovered the Ryudo's secret and, using his new generation cyborgs, he engages in a plan to kidnap Owaru for his scientific experiments...
8	"The Iron Dragon"; Transliteration: "Rampage of the Iron Dragon" (Japanese: 鋼鉄竜暴走)	Hisayuki Toriumi	Akinori Endo	November 10, 1992
Owaru Ryudo is still captive at the lab awaiting dissection at the hands of the evil, butchering, Dr Tamozawa. The remaining brothers, relentless in their search for him, are being pursued by government agencies. Forced to flee, they steal a military tank in collaboration with a rebellious army captain eager for a slice of the action. The chase is on and time is running out for Owaru and his brothers to salvage the city of Tokyo...
9	"The Fierce Wind"; Transliteration: "Storm of the White Dragon King" (Japanese: 烈風の白竜王)	Hisayuki Toriumi	Akinori Endo	February 1, 1993
The ruthless Lady L has kidnapped Owaru and has held him captive in an electrified cage at the Yokota Air Base, ready to be transported to America. Hajime sets off on a lone rescue mission to try and free his brother but the attempt causes a disastrous airplane explosion on the runway. The trauma awakens the White Dragon of the Western Isles within Owaru and he begins to destroy the airbase and the town near it. Realising the awesome power of the beast may injure the innocent, there is only one way Hajime can control its power...but even that might be too frightening to conceive...
10	"Narrow Escape"; Transliteration: "The Brothers' Greatest Escape" (Japanese: 四兄弟脱出行)	Kyōsuke Mikuriya	Kazuhiko Gōdo	February 28, 1993
Lady L has more evil plans in store for the Ryudo brothers when she organises their arrest by the police. A replica of Hajime attempts to release the prisoners and in the process destroys the police station, having the Ryudo brothers branded as terrorists. The entire law enforcement agencies of the city are placed on emergency alert and are part of the biggest manhunt ever known. The Ryudo brothers are the innocent victims...the hunt is on!
11	"The Blue Dragon Soars to Heaven"; Transliteration: "The Soaring Blue Dragon King" (Japanese: 天翔る青竜王)	Kyōsuke Mikuriya	Akinori Endo	March 5, 1993
Hajime has become a captive of Lady L and is brought aboard the aircraft carrier, Dynasty. But waiting for him on board is the dissecting maniac, Dr Tamozawa. Tamozawa's cruel treatment summons the wrath of Hajime, and the fourth dragon finally emerges. The Blue Dragon King can control the force of gravity and it plucks the Dynasty and her fleet up into the stratosphere. Tsuzuku and the others, who have rejoined their three brave friends: Shinkai, Mizuchi and Nijikawa, escape Japan in a defense transport plane. But now they must find the Blue Dragon King!
12	"Four Dragons In the Heaven"; Transliteration: "The Four Dragon Kings Take To the Sky" (Japanese: 天空の四竜王)	Kyōsuke Mikuriya	Akinori Endo	March 10, 1993
The defense transport plane that Tsuzuku and the others have stolen is in danger of crashing! Desperate to save Matsuri and their friends, Tsuzuku and his two brothers transform themselves into all powerful dragons. Meanwhile, the Blue Dragon King has travelled to America and begins to destroy all the military bases and facilities and finally targets his anger towards the US President. The other three dragons manage to reunite with Hajime but can their combined power overcome the spirit known as the Shiyu, an ancient enemy of the dragon race over 3,000 years ago? The world is on the brink of Armageddon as it enters the ultimate battle....
