= Bokkō (manga) =

Japanese manga series

- Cover of the first volume

墨攻
- Genre: Historical fiction
- Created by: Ken'ichi Sakemi
- Manga
- Written by: Ken'ichi Sakemi; Sentarō Kubota (scenario cooperation)
- Illustrated by: Hideki Mori
- Published by: Shogakukan
- Magazine: Big Comic
- Original run: November 1992 – November 1996
- Volumes: 11

Bokkō (墨攻; lit. 'Mohist Attack') is a Japanese manga series written and illustrated by Hideki Mori. It is based on the novel of the same name by Ken'ichi Sakemi.

The manga was serialized in Big Comic (Shogakukan) from 1992 to 1996 and won the 40th Shogakukan Manga Award in 1995. It was adapted in to the 2006 Chinese, Korean, Japanese, and Hong Kong joint film, A Battle of Wits. The manga version changed the era and took on an original direction compared to the novel as it went along.

== Plot ==
About 2,300 years ago, China during the Warring States period, where the seven kingdoms of Han, Wei, Zhao, Qi, Yan, Qin, and Chu. Zhao had a large army on the border on the other side of the river, ready to attack Liangcheng, a small walled city in Yan. The lord of Liangcheng asked for help from the Mohists, a group of experts in defending fortified cities, to protect his castle. However, only one person, Kakuri, arrived. Only one month remained before the 15,000-strong Zhao army arrived. In order to repair the city walls, upgrade the weapons, and train the peasants to become soldiers, Kakurei urges the lord of the fortified city to give him full control of the city, much to the displeasure of the generals. Distrusted and even hated, Kakuri eventually gained the trust of the citizens of Liangcheng. With no support from the Mohists, Kakuri faces off against a large army.

== Publication ==
- Big Comics (tankōbon), 11 volumes
- Shogakukan Bunko (bunkoban) 8 volumes

== See also ==
- Mohism
