= Chimera Kō =

Japanese novel series by Baku Yumemakura

- Cover of the first volume of the 2008 edition

キマイラ・吼 (Kimaira Kō)
- Novel series
- Written by: Baku Yumemakura
- Illustrated by: Yoshitaka Amano (1982–2002); Katsuya Terada (2008–present); Shirow Miwa (2013–present)
- Published by: Asahi Sonorama; Asahi Shimbun Publications; Kadokawa Shoten
- Original run: 1982 – 2002
- Volumes: 16
- Anime film
- Directed by: Mamoru Oshii

Chimera Kō (Japanese: キマイラ・吼, Hepburn: Kimaira Kō) is a Japanese novel series written by Baku Yumemakura. An anime film adaptation directed by Mamoru Oshii is in production.

== Plot ==
Kō Ōtori, an otherwise ordinary high school student, is plagued by a recurring nightmare in which a beast devours him from within. This unsettling dream reflects a latent power he does not yet understand. Kō's life changes when he encounters Reiichi Kuki, an elite upperclassman who dominates the school through his intellect and presence. Their meeting triggers the awakening of Kō's hidden abilities and draws him into a violent and surreal struggle involving inhuman strength, predatory instincts, and questions about what it means to be human. As the story progresses, Kō is forced to confront the monstrous force inside himself and the role Kuki plays in shaping his fate.

== Publication ==
Baku Yumemakura originally published the series as 16 bunkobon volumes between 1982 and 2002, with cover illustrations by Yoshitaka Amano. It was later rereleased as 8 tankōbon volumes between 2000 and 2002, again with covers by Yoshitaka Amano. Both the bunkobon and tankōbon editions were published by Asahi Sonorama. Asahi Shimbun Publications began publishing a new edition with covers by Katsuya Terada in 2008, and Kadokawa Shoten began publishing a separate edition, with covers by Shirow Miwa, in 2013.

== Anime film adaptation ==
On March 5, 2018, Yumemakura's agency revealed via Twitter that Mamoru Oshii will adapt the novels for the screen. A note by Yumemakura in the 13th volume of the novels confirmed that the adaptation will be an anime film, although Oshii's role in the production was not specified. Comic Natalie later reported that he would serve as director.
