= Mamoru Oshii =

Japanese filmmaker, television director, and writer (born 1951)

- 押井守
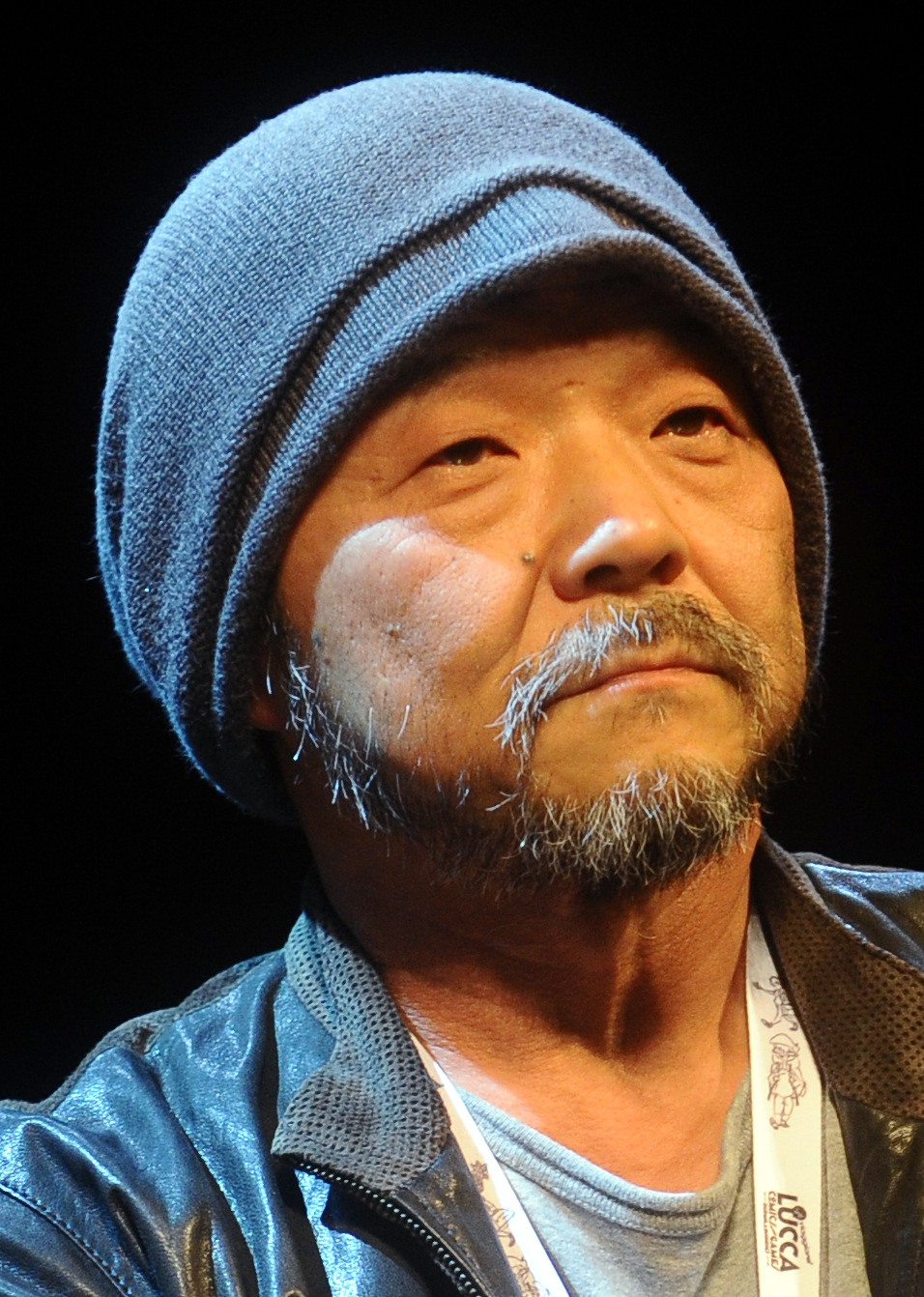
- Oshii at Lucca Comics & Games in 2015
- Born: 8 August 1951 (age 75); Tokyo, Japan
- Occupations: Film director screenwriter mangaka television director novelist
- Years active: 1977–present
- Known for: Ghost in the Shell; Patlabor; Urusei Yatsura; Angel's Egg
- Relatives: Otsuichi (son-in-law)

Mamoru Oshii (押井 守, Oshii Mamoru; born 8 August 1951) is a Japanese filmmaker, television director and writer. Famous for his philosophy-oriented storytelling, Oshii has directed a number of acclaimed anime films, including Urusei Yatsura 2: Beautiful Dreamer (1984), Angel's Egg (1985), Patlabor 2: The Movie (1993), and Ghost in the Shell (1995). He also holds the distinction of directing the first ever OVA, Dallos (1983). As a writer, Oshii has worked as a screenwriter, and occasionally as a manga writer and novelist. His most notable works as a writer include the manga Kerberos Panzer Cop (1988–2000) and its feature film adaptation Jin-Roh: The Wolf Brigade (1999).

For his work, Oshii has received and been nominated for numerous awards, including the Palme d'Or and Leone d'Oro (Golden Lion). He has also attracted praise from many directors, including James Cameron, Steven Spielberg and The Wachowskis, especially for his work on Ghost in the Shell.

== Career ==
=== Early career (1977–1982) ===
Oshii has said he had an interest in Christianity and the Bible from an early age. In an interview with Animerica magazine in 1996 that "I really liked the Bible when I was a little boy. And when I was a student, at one point I was planning to enter a seminary, but I didn't. Even now, though, I read the Bible sometimes."

As a student, Mamoru Oshii was fascinated by the film La Jetée by Chris Marker. He also repeatedly watched European cinema, such as films by Federico Fellini, Ingmar Bergman, Michelangelo Antonioni and Jean-Pierre Melville. These filmmakers, together with Jean-Luc Godard, Andrei Tarkovsky and Jerzy Kawalerowicz, would later serve as influences for Oshii's own cinematic career. He was also influenced by his father, who was a cinephile.

In 1976, he graduated from Tokyo Gakugei University. The following year, he entered Tatsunoko Productions and worked on his first anime as a storyboard artist on Ippatsu Kanta-kun. During this period at Tatsunoko, Oshii worked on many anime as a storyboard artist, most of which were part of the Time Bokan television series. In 1980, he moved to Studio Pierrot under the supervision of his mentor, Hisayuki Toriumi.

=== Urusei Yatsura (1981–1984) ===
Mamoru Oshii's work as director and storyboard artist of the animated Urusei Yatsura TV series brought him into the spotlight. Following its success, he directed two Urusei Yatsura films: Urusei Yatsura: Only You (1983) and Urusei Yatsura 2: Beautiful Dreamer (1984). The first film, though an original story, continued much in the spirit of the series. Beautiful Dreamer was also written by Oshii with no consultation from Takahashi and was a significant departure and an early example of his now contemporary style. Beautiful Dreamer is also notable for experimenting with concepts such as a time loop, where a high-school class relives the same day over and over again, as well as dreams and reality manipulation.

=== Dallos, Lupin, Angel's Egg and Anchor (1983–1985) ===
In the midst of his work with Studio Pierrot, Oshii took on independent work and directed the first OVA, Dallos, in 1983. In 1984, Oshii left Studio Pierrot. Around this time, Oshii was hired to direct a movie for Lupin the Third for summer 1985, for which he started writing a column in Animage magazine in December 1984. However, his proposal for it was very eccentric, with the producers from Yomiuri TV and Toho opposed his vision of the film, saying that it "made no sense". The film had been widely advertised with Oshii's name attached to it, and with the project based around him, they could not make the film without his proposal getting approved, and it was cancelled. He would later go on to reuse themes and concepts he had come up with for the movie in later works such as Angel's Egg, Ghost in the Shell, and multiple Patlabor movies.

Oshii said that creating Ghost in the Shell allowed him to "finally get over Lupin" but continued to use elements from it in future films such as 009 RE:CYBORG, which was directed by Kenji Kamiyama, a student of Oshii, that Oshii was originally supposed to direct and had him participating in the scriptwriting for, which was also heavily influenced by the themes of Oshii's Lupin, which reused some of its plot, and The Next Generation Patlabor: Shuto Kessen, which reused the ending he originally had in mind for Lupin. He originally wanted to use this ending for the first Patlabor movie but was stopped by Izubuchi and others. Oshii was eventually able to revisit Lupin in Lupin the 3rd Part 6 in which he wrote the script for two episodes of which the second, "Darwin's Bird" reused some elements from the cancelled movie.

Moving to Studio Deen, Oshii wrote and directed Angel's Egg (1985), a surreal film rich with Biblical symbolism, featuring the character designs of Yoshitaka Amano. A producer of the film, Toshio Suzuki, later founded Studio Ghibli with Hayao Miyazaki and Isao Takahata. Following the release of the film, Miyazaki and Takahata began collaborating with Mamoru Oshii on his next film, Anchor. The film was canceled early in the initial planning stages when the trio had artistic disagreements. Despite their differences, Toshio Suzuki and Studio Ghibli would later help Oshii with his production of Ghost in the Shell 2: Innocence (2004). To this day, Oshii maintains skeptical, but respectful, views of each of Takahata and Miyazaki's films. Though he has been critical of Miyazaki's attitude towards his workers, he also claims that he would feel "strangely empty" and "it would be boring" if both Miyazaki and Takahata stopped making films.

=== Patlabor and live-action (1987–1993) ===
In the late 1980s, Oshii was solicited by his friend Kazunori Itō to join Headgear as a director. The group was composed of Kazunori Itō (screenwriter), Masami Yuki (manga artist), Yutaka Izubuchi (mechanical designer), Akemi Takada (character designer) and Mamoru Oshii (director). Together they were responsible for the Patlabor TV series, OVA, and films.

Between production of the Patlabor movies/series, Oshii delved into live-action for the first time, releasing his first non-animated film, The Red Spectacles (1987). This led to another live-action work titled Stray Dog: Kerberos Panzer Cops (1991); both films are part of Oshii's ongoing Kerberos Saga. Following Stray Dog Oshii made yet another live-action film, Talking Head (1992).

In the early 1990s, Oshii was approached by Studio Ghibli to direct an animated film adaptation of Ken'ichi Sakemi's novel Bokkō. Animator Katsuya Kondo even drew image boards, but the project was cancelled again due to a conflict between Oshii and Miyazaki.

=== Ghost in the Shell and international acclaim (1995–2008) ===
In 1995, Mamoru Oshii released his landmark animated cyberpunk film, Ghost in the Shell, in Japan, the United States, and Europe. It hit the top of the US Billboard video charts in 1996, the first anime video ever to do so. Concerning a female cyborg desperate to find the meaning of her existence, the film was a critical success and is widely regarded to be a masterpiece and anime classic. Additionally, Oshii said that creating Ghost in the Shell allowed him to "finally get over Lupin".

After a 5-year hiatus from directing to work on other projects, Oshii returned to live-action with the Japanese-Polish feature Avalon (2001), which was selected for an out of competition screening at the Cannes Film Festival. His next animated feature film was the long-awaited sequel to Ghost in the Shell, titled Ghost in the Shell 2: Innocence. Four years in the making, the film focuses on Batou as he investigates a series of gruesome murders, while trying to reconcile with his deteriorating humanity. Though it received mixed reviews, Innocence was selected to compete at the 2004 Cannes Film Festival for the coveted Palme d'Or prize, making it the first (and thus far, only) anime to be so honored.

Oshii was approached to be one of the directors of The Animatrix, but he was unable to participate because of his work in Innocence. Following Innocence, Oshii also contemplated directing a segment for the anthology film Paris, je t'aime, but ultimately declined the offer.

Meanwhile, in 2005, there were talks of a Kenta Fukasaku and Oshii collaboration. It was announced that Oshii would write the script for a film titled Elle is Burning, as well as provide CGI consultation, while Fukasaku would direct. Although Oshii completed the script, the film was ultimately shelved because, among other problems, the large budget it would require.

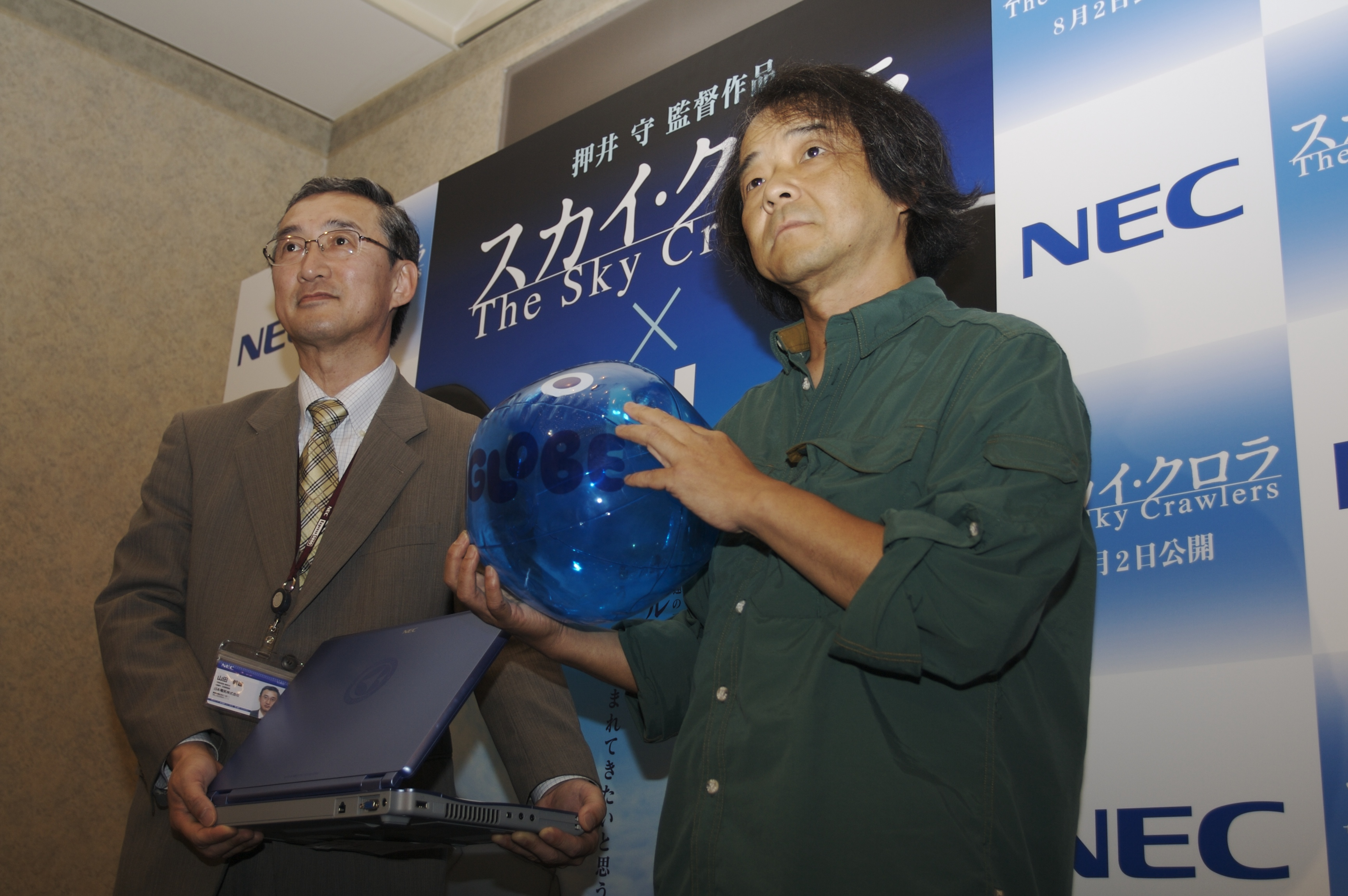
Oshii promotes The Sky Crawlers, 2 June 2008.

Oshii's next film, The Sky Crawlers (2008), competed for the Golden Lion in the Venice Film Festival. Subsequent to The Sky Crawlers, Oshii wrote the screenplay to the Production I.G film Musashi: The Dream of the Last Samurai, which has been described as possibly the first ever anime documentary.

=== Return to live-action and anime directing hiatus (2009–present) ===
In 2009, he wrote and directed the live-action feature Assault Girls and served as creative director for the Production I.G-produced segment of the animated short film anthology Halo Legends. In 2010, Oshii announced his next film will be an adaptation of Mitsuteru Yokoyama's Tetsujin-28 manga. The Tetsujin-28 project turned out to be a live action film called '28 1/2'.

In 2012, Oshii announced that he was working on a new live-action film. He will be writing and directing the military science-fiction thriller Garm Wars: The Last Druid. The film's trailer was released in September 2014, and the premiere screening was held the following month at the 27th Tokyo International Film Festival.

He followed with the live-action film Tōkyō Mukokuseki Shōjo, a suspense thriller released in July 2015.

In March 2017, Toonami began airing Sand Whale and Me, a live-action micro-series directed by Oshii. In 2018, it was reported that an anime film adaptation of Chimera Kō is under production, with Oshii serving as director.

In June 2019, Oshii announced Vladlove, a comedy series that he described as a "girl-meets-girl story" about a vampire. The project also departs from the Japanese anime world's production committee system because Oshii is backed by a single investor, real estate company Ichigo Inc.

== Style ==
Oshii has stated his approach to directing is in direct contrast to what he perceives to be the Hollywood formula, i.e. he regards the visuals as the most important aspect, followed by the story and the characters come last. He also notes that his main motivation in making films is to "create worlds different from our own."

Mamoru Oshii's films typically open with an action sequence. Thereafter, the film usually follows a much slower rhythm punctuated by several sequences of fast action. Oshii also frequently inserts a montage sequence in each of his movies, typically two-minutes long, muted of dialogue and set against the backdrop of Kenji Kawai's music. Recurrent imagery include reflections/mirrors, flocks of birds, and Basset Hounds similar to his own. The basset hound was seen most prominently in Ghost in the Shell 2: Innocence, and was a major plot point in his live-action film Avalon.

Oshii is especially noted for how he significantly strays from the source material his films are based on, such as in his adaptations of Urusei Yatsura and Ghost in the Shell. In their original manga versions, these titles exhibited a mood that was more along the lines of frantic slapstick comedy (Urusei Yatsura) or convivial dramedy (Ghost in the Shell). Oshii, in adapting the works created a slower and darker atmosphere especially noticeable in Urusei Yatsura 2: Beautiful Dreamer. For the Ghost in the Shell movie, Oshii elected to leave out the humor and character banter of Masamune Shirow's original manga. This can also be seen in Patlabor 2: The Movie, in which Oshii eschewed the slice-of-life aspect of the original source in favor of a more political thriller focused story.

"Oshii's work... steers clear of such stereotypes in both image and sexual orientation," wrote Andrez Bergen in an article on Oshii that appeared in Japan's Daily Yomiuri newspaper in 2004. "His movies are dark, thought-provoking, minimalist diatribes with an underlying complexity; at the same time he pushes the perimeters of technology when it comes to the medium itself. Character design plays equitable importance."

Oshii also wrote and directed several animated movies and live-action films based on his personal political views, influenced by the Anpo protests of the 1960s and 1970s in which he participated. The Anpo protests were protests during 1960s Japan against the US-Japan Security Treaty. The first film to touch on this political background was the live-action film The Red Spectacles. This film, set in the same world as the Oshii-scripted film Jin-Roh: The Wolf Brigade (1999), is about a former member of the special unit of the Tokyo Metropolitan Police Force dealing with a fascist government.

Many of his works include references to Christianity and the Bible.

== Influence ==
The Wachowskis are known to have been impressed with Ghost in the Shell and went as far as to screen it to producer Joel Silver to show him what kind of film they wanted to make for The Matrix. Indeed, various scenes from Ghost in the Shell have been seemingly lifted and transposed in The Matrix. Ghost in the Shell was also the chief inspiration for the video game Oni.

His 1984 anime film Urusei Yatsura 2: Beautiful Dreamer, which experimented with concepts such as a time loop, dreams, and reality manipulation, has drawn comparisons to later films including Groundhog Day (1993) and Dark City (1998), and is believed to have influenced these films.

Kenji Kamiyama, the director of the Ghost in the Shell: Stand Alone Complex television series, considers Oshii his mentor, and states that he "totally tried to copy" Oshii's style when creating the Stand Alone Complex series.

Many have also noted the similarities in the Helghast design from the Killzone series of video games to the Kerberos Panzer Protect Gear, first seen in the 1987 film The Red Spectacles. Asked of these observations, Guerrilla Games, video game developer for the Killzone series, did not address the similarities. The developers contend the Helghast design was inspired by the gas masks of World War I, though this does not account for the similarity in the glowing red/orange eyes between the two designs.

James Cameron is another filmmaker who has voiced his admiration for Oshii, stating at one point that Avalon was "the most artistic, beautiful and stylish sci-fi film." He also praised Ghost in the Shell, stating it was "the first truly adult animation film to reach a level of literary and visual excellence."

== Personal life ==
As of 2009, Oshii lived in Atami, Shizuoka Prefecture, Japan with his dog, a mutt named Daniel. When commenting on religion he said "I'm not a Christian, but I've been reading the Bible since my student days".

== Collaboration ==
Mamoru Oshii has worked extensively with Production I.G. Every animated film he has made since Patlabor: The Movie (1989) has been produced under the studio. He also worked closely with screenwriter Kazunori Itō; they made five films together, beginning with The Red Spectacles and ending with Avalon. His closest colleague, however, is music composer Kenji Kawai. Kawai has composed most of the music in Oshii's work, including ten of his feature films. According to Oshii, "Kenji Kawai's music is responsible for 50 percent of [his] films' successes" and he "can't do anything without [Kenji Kawai]."

== Kerberos saga ==
=== 1980s ===
The English version of Kerberos Panzer Cop

The Kerberos saga is Mamoru Oshii's lifework, created in 1986. A military science fiction franchise and alternate history universe, it spans all media and has lasted for more than 20 years since his January 1987 radio drama While Waiting for the Red Spectacles. In 1987, Oshii released The Red Spectacles, his first live-action feature and the first Kerberos saga film. The manga adaptation, Kerberos Panzer Cop, written by Mamoru Oshii and illustrated by Kamui Fujiwara, was serialized in 1988 until 1990.

=== 1990s ===
Acts 1~4 of Kerberos Panzer Cop was compiled in 1990 as a single volume. In 1991, the live-action film adaptation of the tankōbon was released as StrayDog Kerberos Panzer Cops. In 1999, the Oshii-scripted Jin-Roh: The Wolf Brigade, the anime feature film adaptation of the manga's first volume, was directed by Oshii's collaborator Hiroyuki Okiura, and was released in International Film Festivals starting in France.

=== 2000s ===
In 2000, the second part of the manga (Acts 5~8) was serialized, then published and compiled as a second volume. After the manga's completion and publishing as volumes 1 and 2, Jin-Roh: The Wolf Brigade was finally released in Japan during the same year. In 2003, Kerberos Panzer Cop's sequel, Kerberos Saga Rainy Dogs was serialized, then compiled as a single volume in 2005. In 2006 Kerberos Panzer Jäger was broadcast in Japan as a 20-year celebration of the saga. The same year, Oshii revealed his plan to release an anime/3DCG adaptation film of the drama in 2009, the Kerberos Panzer Blitzkrieg project. In late 2006, Oshii launched a Kerberos saga crossover manga series titled Kerberos & Tachiguishi.

== Other work ==
In addition to his directing work, Oshii is a prolific screenwriter and author of manga and novels. As well as writing the Kerberos series of manga, Oshii wrote the script for the manga Seraphim 266,613,336 Wings originally illustrated by Satoshi Kon. Their collaboration was difficult due to artistic differences over the development of the story and Seraphim was not completed. Part one was serialised in 16 instalments in the May 1994 through November 1995 issues of monthly Animage.

Following Satoshi Kon's death in 2010 it was partially reissued in a special memorial supplement of Monthly Comic Ryū and published in comic book form the same year. Oshii has since worked on a Seraphim Prologue, the Three Wise Men's Worship Volume, with illustrations by Katsuya Terada, released by Tokuma Shoten as another Ryū supplement. Oshii also wrote the screenplay of Jin-Roh: The Wolf Brigade and is credited as a co-planner for Blood: The Last Vampire (2000) and Blood+. Oshii also wrote the first tie-in novel for the film entitled Blood: The Last Vampire: Night of the Beasts. It was published originally in Japan in October 2000, and later received an English-translated North American release on 23 November 2005.

Oshii is also credited as providing "story concept" for Ghost in the Shell: S.A.C. 2nd GIG; he describes his role as supervision of the entire series and being responsible for writing the plot of each of the show's episodes. In 2005 Oshii served as supervisor for the Mobile Police Patlabor Comes Back: MiniPato video game. In 2008, he again served as special consultant for the development of a video game, The Sky Crawlers: Innocent Aces.

In 2025, Oshii made a special appearance in Death Stranding 2: On The Beach, a video game by Hideo Kojima and his development studio, Kojima Productions, as an NPC known in-game as "The Pizza Chef." Keenan Shimizu provided his voice.

== Awards and nominations ==
Annie Awards:

- 1996: Outstanding Achievement for Directing in a Feature Production (Ghost in the Shell) - nominated
- 2004: Outstanding Achievement for Directing in a Feature Production (Ghost in the Shell: Innocence) - nominated
- 2016: Winsor McCay Award

Animation Kobe:

- 1996: Feature Film Award (Ghost in the Shell)
- 2004: Feature Film Award (Ghost in the Shell: Innocence)

Cannes Film Festival

- 2004: Nominated for Palme d'Or (Ghost in the Shell: Innocence)

London Sci-Fi Film Festival:

- 2002: Best Feature Film (Avalon)

Mainichi Film Concours:

- 1993: Best Animated Film (Patlabor 2: The Movie)
- 2008: Best Animated Film (The Sky Crawlers)

Nihon SF Taisho Award:

- 2004: 25th Nihon SF Taisho Award (Ghost in the Shell 2: Innocence)

Sitges - Catalan International Film Festival:

- 2004: Orient Express Award (Ghost in the Shell 2: Innocence)

Venice Film Festival:

- 2008: Nominated for Golden Lion (The Sky Crawlers)
- 2008: Future Film Festival Digital Award (The Sky Crawlers)

== Filmography ==
Selection of directed features

Year	Title
1983	Urusei Yatsura: Only You
1984	Urusei Yatsura 2: Beautiful Dreamer
1985	Angel's Egg
1989	Patlabor: The Movie
1990	MAROKO
1992	Talking Head
1993	Patlabor 2: The Movie
1995	Ghost in the Shell
2001	Avalon
2004	Ghost in the Shell 2: Innocence
2008	The Sky Crawlers
2014	Garm Wars: The Last Druid
2019	Blood Friends

== Works cited ==
- Ruh, Brian (2004). Stray Dog of Anime: The Films of Mamoru Oshii. Palgrave Macmillan. ISBN 1403963347.
- Mamoru Oshii -- Senses of Cinema: Great Directors Critical Database
- Production I.G
- Ruh, Brian (2014). Stray Dog of Anime: The Films of Mamoru Oshii. Palgrave MacMillan. ISBN 9781137437891.
- Hartlieb, Sean (2016). Humanity in Anime: Analyzing the Films of Mamoru Oshii. Createspace.com. ISBN 9781530069231.
