= Wasōbon =

Japanese traditional bookbinding

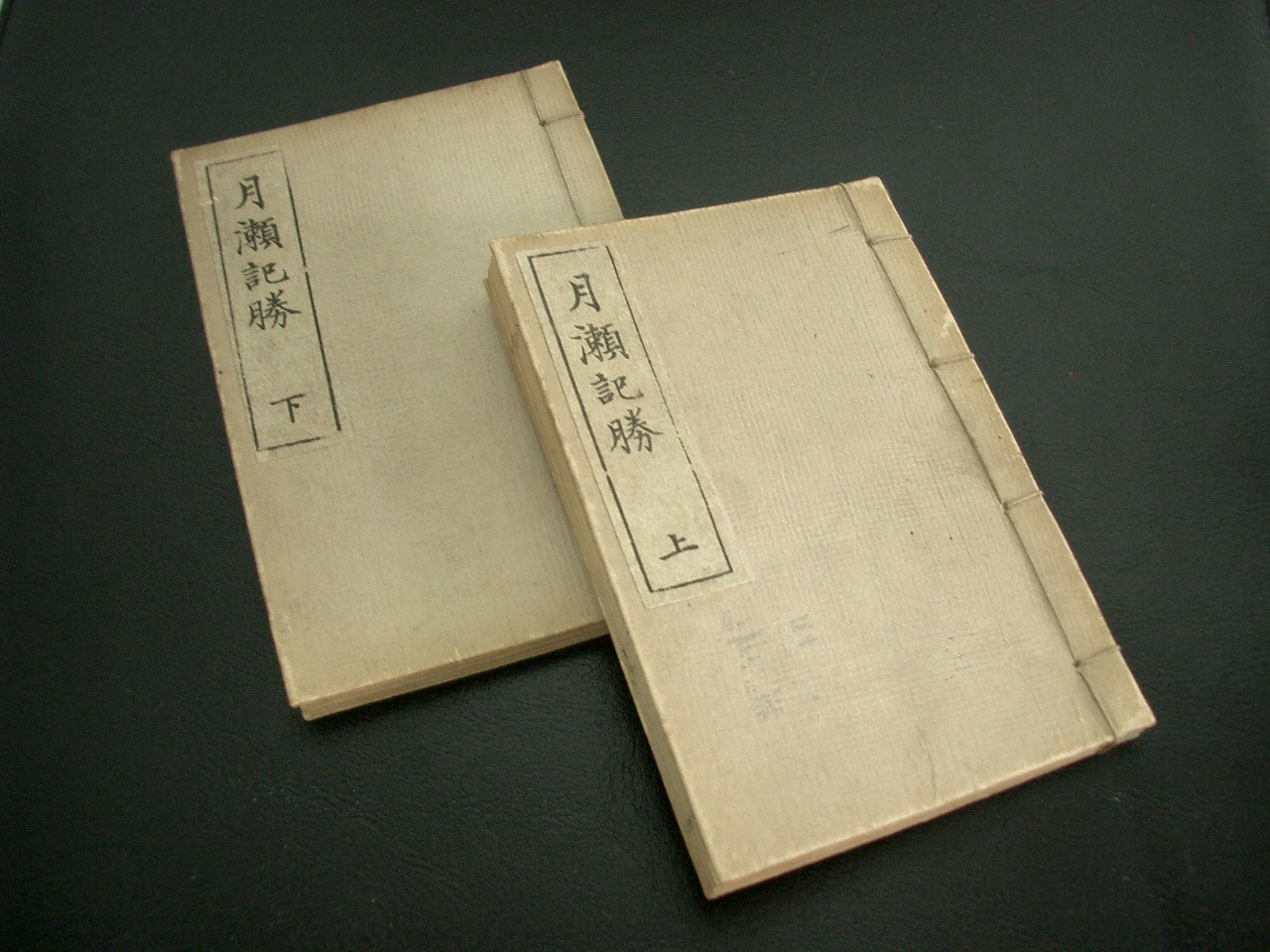
19th century books of Japan

Wasōbon (Japanese: 和装本, or wahon (和本)) is a traditional book style in Japan that dates from the late eighth century AD with the printing of "Hyakumantō Darani" during the reign of Empress Shōtoku (764–770 AD). Most of the books were hand-copied until the Edo period (1603–1867), when woodblock printing became comparatively affordable and widespread. Movable-type printing had been used from the late 16th century, but for various aesthetic and practical reasons woodblock printing and hand-copied remained dominant until much later. Japanese equivalents for "book" include 本 (hon) and 書籍 (shoseki). The former term indicates only bound books, and does not include scrolls. The latter is used for printed matter only. The most general term is 書物 (shomotsu), which means all written or printed matter that has been collected into a single unit, regardless of construction.

== Book composition ==
Japanese books were traditionally made of washi, or Japanese paper. This durable, fibrous paper does not easily yellow or become brittle with age, which has contributed to the remarkable preservation of early books. Western-style wood-pulp paper became dominant beginning in the Meiji period (1868–1912), and washi is very rarely used for printing in Japan today.

=== Binding methods ===
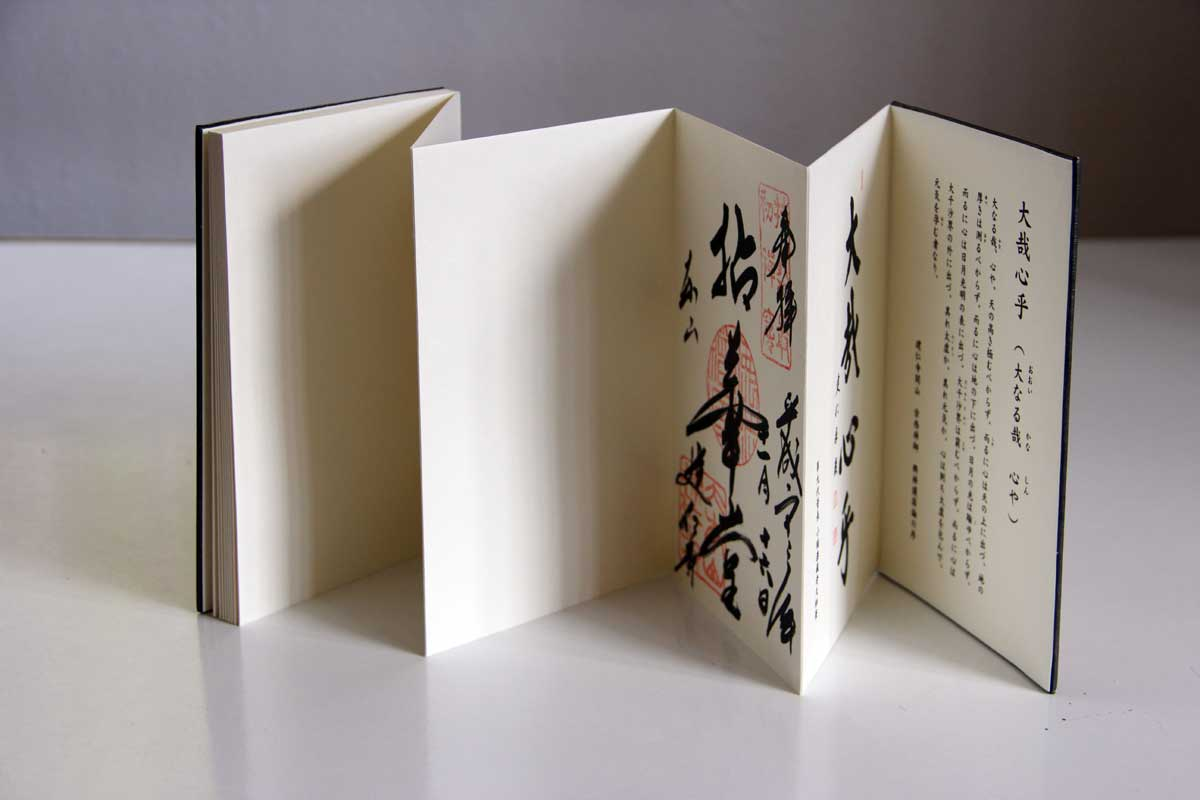
Japanese Orihon - concertina

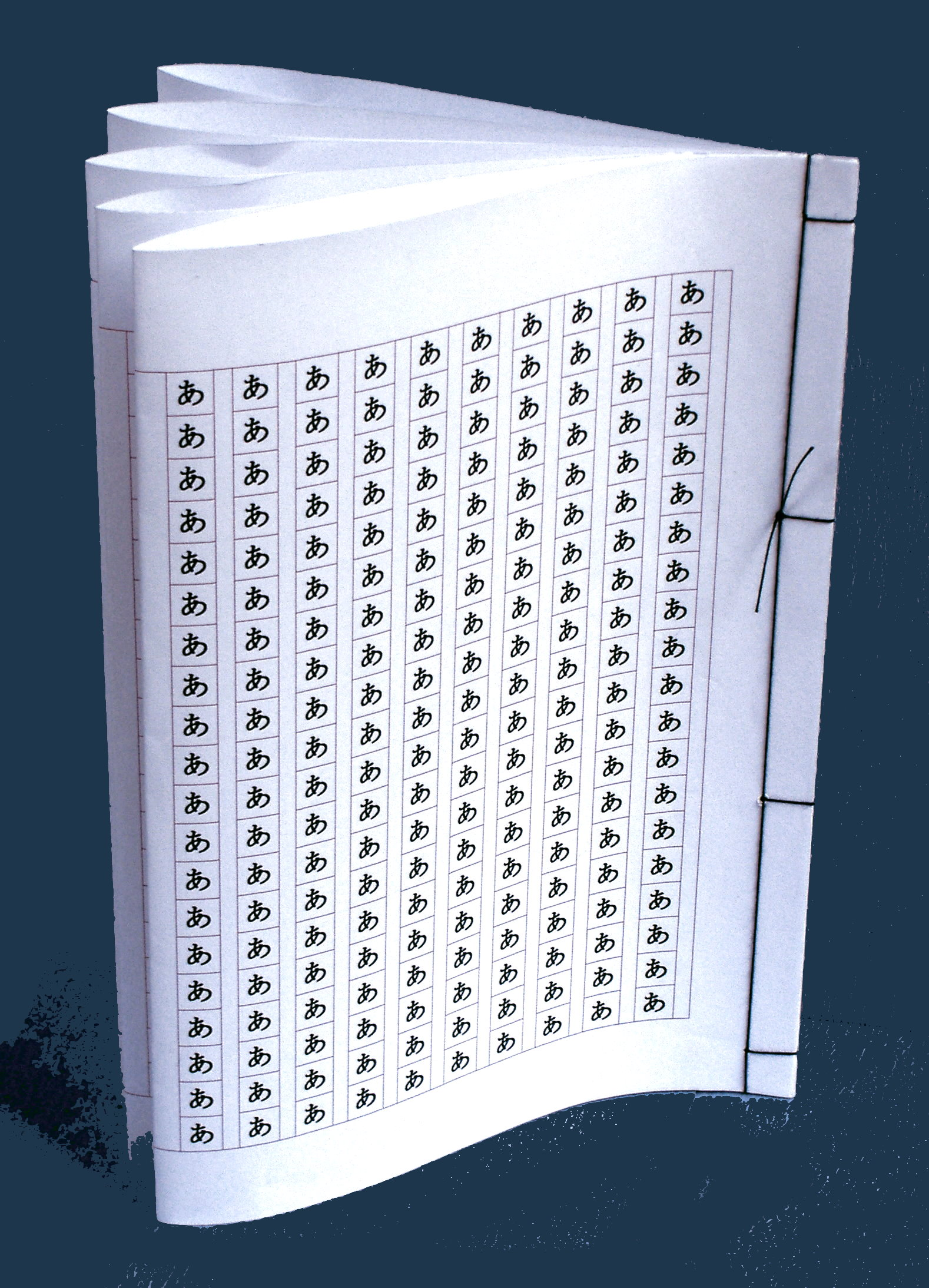
Fukuro toji binding

Japanese bookmakers used a great variety of different methods for constructing books, depending on time period and whether the book was hand-copied or printed.

==== Pre-binding books ====
- Kansubon (巻子本), a.k.a. Makimono (巻物), or "scrolls"
  This early form of bookbinding is almost identical to Western scrolls. These kansubon are not constructed of a single, continuous piece of paper, but rather a number of pages arranged horizontally and glued together along their vertical edges. This binding method was used almost exclusively for hand-copied manuscripts, and is now rarely used.
  Orihon (折本), or "folding books"
  Orihon are similar to kansubon in that they consist of individual sheets of paper arranged horizontally and glued together, but instead of being rolled for storage, these books are creased at regular intervals and folded accordion-style. Folding books were most commonly used for hand-copied manuscripts, but a certain number of modern, printed books continue to be published in orihon style. This concertina-style binding was more portable than the scroll, and is thought to have been inspired by palm-leaf books which were carried along Indian and Chinese trade routes. Traditionally, the Japanese orihon featured Buddhist scriptures with images and text on only one side. However, some orihon, typically those featuring calligraphy and paintings, were pasted together so that both sides could be utilized.

==== Bound books ====
- Detchōsō (粘葉装), or "glued books"
  To create these books, binders took a double-wide piece of paper and folded it vertically to create a single, connected piece of paper with four printable sides. A number of these folded pages would then be stacked and bound together by applying glue to the creased edges, the front page, and the back page, then mounting the glued surfaces with a cover made from a continuous piece of paper. This binding method was used primarily for hand-copied manuscripts.
- Tetsuyōsō (綴葉装), or "sewn books"
  Like glued books, these sewn books consist of double-wide paper folded to ordinary page width. Unlike glued books, however, in making sewn books, binders made stacks of approximately five double-wide sheets and then folded them. A number of these packets of folded sheets would then be sewn together along the creases. No additional covering paper was applied to reinforce the book or hide the stitching; relevant information was written directly on the first and last page. This style was used primarily for hand-copied manuscripts.
- Fukuro toji (袋綴じ), or "bound-pocket books"
  Bound-pocket books are also made by stacking sheets of double-wide paper that have been folded individually, but unlike glued or sewn books, the stacked pages are bound by sewing the loose edge opposite the crease together with either thread or tightly wrapped, thread-like strips paper. A front and back cover are applied before binding. This binding method means that each double-wide piece of paper has only two printing surfaces instead of four, but by eliminating the need for double-sided legibility, bound-pocket books enabled publishers to use significantly thinner paper than was necessary for glued or sewn books. This binding style also allowed for a much greater variety of appearance than either of the other forms of bound books, as the pages could be sewn according to any number of traditional and fashionable methods. Fukuro toji binding was used primarily for printed books. Approximately 90 percent of Edo-period books were bound using this "bound-pocket" style.

== Book sizes ==
Edo period paper came in several standard sizes; the size of books was, accordingly, standard. Though there are surely exceptions, larger books generally contained more formal, serious, material, while smaller books were less formal and less serious. For example, many manuscript copies of scholarly texts are found in the ōbon size, while satirical novels were often produced in smaller sizes.

- Ōbon (大本, "large books"), roughly 10 by 7 inches (25 cm × 18 cm), and chūbon (中本, "medium books"), which are roughly half that size, were made using Mino paper, which was roughly 10–13 by 13–17 inches (25 cm–33 cm × 33 cm–43 cm) inches in size.
- Hanshi-bon (半紙本, "half paper books"), roughly 9 by 6 inches (23 cm × 15 cm), and kobon (小本, "small books"), roughly 6 by 5 inches (15 cm × 13 cm), were made from paper roughly 9–10 by 13–14 inches (23 cm–25 cm × 33 cm–36 cm) wide.
- Yotsuhanbon (四半本, "one-quarter books") was perhaps the most common size, with the closed book being 1/4 the size of a full sheet of paper.
- Mutsuhanbon (六半本, "one-sixth books"), also known as masugata-bon (枡形本, "square books"), are 1/6 the size of a full sheet of paper, and are square when closed.
- Yokohon (横本, "horizontal books") are 1/8 the size of a full sheet of paper when closed (that is, the same width as a yotsuhan book, but half as high). Unlike most other formats, yokohon are wider than they are high, resulting in a long and narrow horizontal form when open.

== Printing history ==
Japan has had a long history of printing that has included a variety of different methods and technologies, but until the Edo period most books were still copied by hand. There were many types of printings: woodblock printing was the most popular publishing style, hand-copied printing were less popular and recognized as private publishing together with movable-type printing. The latter were used to print academic and Buddhist printing and one which was banned in woodblock printing. In the printing which used the kana syllabary before the Meiji period, the letters aimed to mimic the hand-written calligraphic style and often resulted in near-perfect imitations that are difficult to distinguish from actual hand-copied works. Works such as religious texts, Chinese poetry, and dictionaries used the printed kaisho style whereas Japanese poetry, primers, and illustrated works used a calligraphic sōsho style. The first Japanese printed book was the Diamond Sutra.

=== Nara Period (710–794) ===
Printing began in Japan in the Nara period with the creation of a remarkable piece of Buddhist material called the Hyakumantō Darani (百万塔陀羅尼), or the Million Dharani Towers. Empress Kōken reputedly printed one million copies of a specific dharani, or Buddhist chant, from 764 to 770 AD. and placed each individual copy inside a foot-tall three-level wooden pagoda. She then dispersed these pagodas to temples all over Japan, where they served devotional purposes. These dharani were printed using the basic woodblock printing technique called seihanbon (整版本) that Buddhist monks brought over from mainland China. The cost of this venture was enormous, and even smaller-scale book reproduction projects could not afford to make use of this printing technique. As a result, the production and distribution of books continued to rely heavily on hand-copying manuscripts.

=== Heian (794–1185) and Kamakura (1185–1333) Periods ===
Printing technology made very little progress during these periods, but the seihanbon woodblock-printing method did become comparatively affordable and widespread. Large Buddhist temple complexes began producing printed copies of sutras for the devotional use of monks studying at these locations. Sutras printed using this particular variant of seihanbon printing are called kasugaban (春日版, Kasuga editions), named after the famous Buddhist mountain Mt. Kasuga in modern-day Nara Prefecture. Kōfuku Temple in the Yamato state (now Nara prefecture) was perhaps the largest producer of these documents, but other similarly sized temple complexes also produced similar texts. As before, the cost of undertaking a printing project using this method remained out of the reach of any individual or institution smaller than these great temples, so books were still primarily reproduced by hand.

=== Muromachi Period (1336–1573) ===
The Muromachi period saw a continuation of the printing precedents established with the Kasuga editions of the Heian and Kamakura periods. Books continued to be printed using seihanbon woodblock techniques, and printed matter continued to be limited to sutras and religious texts for the aid and edification of monks at large temples. The most important variant to the established printing system that came out of this period is the Gozanban (五山版, Five-mountain edition). This edition receives its name from the printing practices unique to the five most important temples in Kyoto (Kenchō-ji 建長寺, Enkaku-ji 円覚寺, Jufuku-ji 寿福寺, Jōchi-ji 浄智寺, and Jōmyō-ji 浄妙寺), as selected by the Muromachi bakufu government. Printing did not become significantly more affordable during this period, so printing remained limited to large temple institutions.

=== The early-modern printing revolution ===
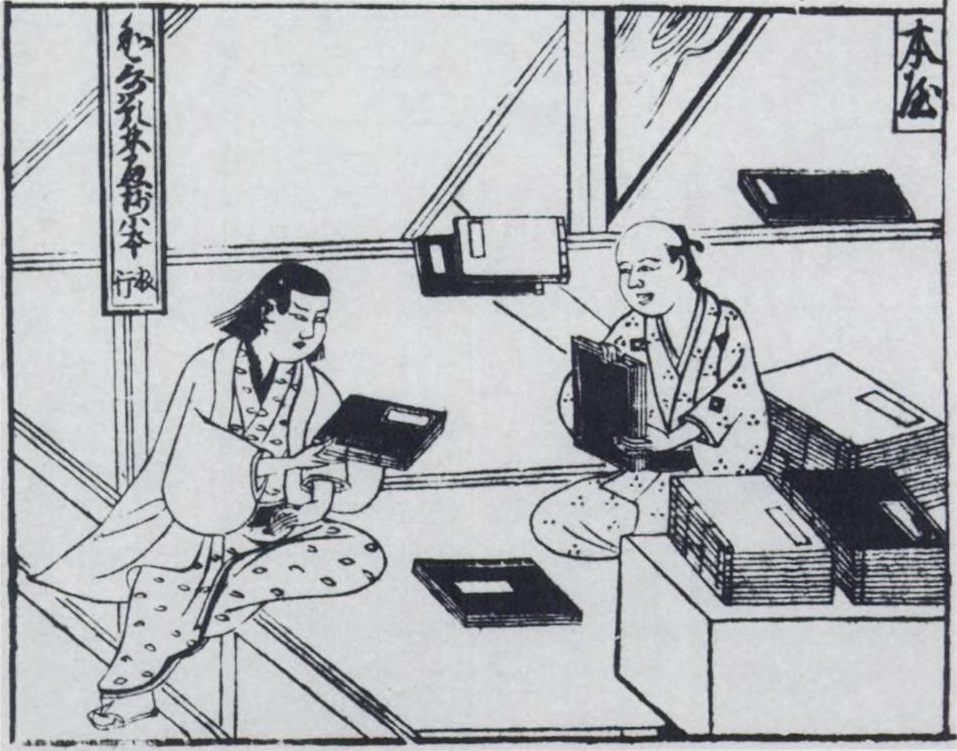
Japanese bookseller from the Jinrin kinmo zui (An Illustrated Encyclopedia of Humanity) from 1690

Two different new printing methods came to Japan almost simultaneously at the end of the 16th and beginning of the 17th centuries, techniques that originated from widely divergent sources and were used for similarly diverse purposes. One of these methods, called Chōsen kokatsuji (朝鮮古活字, Old Korean type) and was originally developed in Goryeo, was brought back from Joseon dynasty after Toyotomi Hideyoshi's military invasions of that country in 1592 and 1597. In this technique, printers took flats of extremely tightly packed sand and carved characters into the surface. This surprisingly durable mold was then filled with molten lead, which, after cooling, could be removed and used as type. This innovation in printing technology drastically lowered the cost of printing, as materials could easily be reused any number of times; the sand could be repacked and recarved, while the soft lead could affordably be remelted as many times as necessary.

Printing was now more affordable than it had ever been, but even so the sheer capital necessary to purchase the requisite materials and find people appropriately familiar with the technique meant that most of the books printed in this manner were official commissions from the emperor or the shōgun. These people were unwilling to waste time and money on fiction and other morally suspicious works, instead ordering the publication of official histories and politically valuable texts that had previously only been available in manuscript editions. Emperor Goyōzei's (後陽成天皇) publication of the Nihon Shoki (日本書紀) in 1599 was among the first of these books, followed later by Tokugawa Ieyasu's (徳川家康) 1616 publication of the Gunsho chiyō (群書治要).

The arrival of Catholic missionaries in 1549 had a lasting effect on Japanese bookmaking, as a number of these missionaries knew of Gutenberg's printing methods and were able to recreate them in Japan. By the end of the 16th century, missionaries associated with St. Francis Xavier's Society of Jesus began producing books using the Gutenberg press, more or less contemporaneously with the Chōsen kokatsuji publications. Books printed using the Gutenberg technique were called Kirishitanban (キリシタン版, Christian editions).

This method is, like the Chōsen kokatsuji, relatively affordable and durable. However, the specialized knowledge necessary and the close association of the technology with Christianity meant that the process did not become extremely widespread. The first books published in this fashion were romanized Japanese translations of western works that the missionaries knew well. These versions were valuable tools for learning the Japanese language, as they afforded missionaries an opportunity to become familiar with the Japanese language without interacting with the complex Japanese orthographical systems. The first such work was a translation of Aesop's Fables, (ESOPO NO FABVLAS) published in 1593. This publication was exceedingly influential, as it was both the first piece of literature to be published in Japan and the country's first introduction to western literature.

Japan's first native-born movable-type technique began shortly after these two imported publication methods arrived in the country. An extremely wealthy resident of the Saga (Kyoto district) district of Kyoto named Suminokura Soan (角倉素庵, 1571–1632) pioneered a form of hand-carved wooden movable type using the skills of the famous craftsman Hon'ami Kōetsu (本阿弥光悦, 1558–1637) and his disciples. Called Sagabon (嵯峨本, Saga books), these are widely considered the most beautiful books in the history of Japanese printing. They are also some of the most rare, however, as Suminokura used this technique largely to make copies of books for his own personal enjoyment, not for widespread use. These books were made with great care using the tetsuyōsō sewn-book binding technique to mimic the manuscript style. Saga books also used a highly decorative type of paper called karakami (唐紙, Chinese paper), which contributed to their unique beauty.

The dominant method of book reproduction in this time changed from manuscript copying to seihanbon woodblock printing, as this technique had been refined to the point that individual commercial institutions could afford to open their own presses.

The introduction of kana in printed works enabled a wider audience, including children, to read and understand the text previously only accessible to those educated and able to read kanji. This resulted in a classification of books called kanazōshi, books printed with both kanji and kana. Booksellers' catalogues, such as a late-1660s example with nearly 2,700 titles, listed books by printing style: block kaisho and calligraphic sōsho. "Higher" works such as Buddhist text and Chinese poetry, those written almost exclusively with kanji, used kaisho. "Lower" works such as Japanese poetry and primers, were printed with kana in ''sōsho. This use of kana not only demonstrated a change in printing practices, but a further distinction between "educated" and "general" audiences.

Literacy in Japan reached around 50–60% by the end of the Edo period in 1867 due to advancements in printing and publishing.

=== Meiji period (1868–1912) and beyond ===
The Meiji era was a period of transition in which publishers gradually introduced western technologies of printing and binding, while continuing to rely, to a greater or lesser extent, on traditional woodblock printing techniques. In the immediate aftermath of the Meiji Restoration, publishing practices remained largely unchanged, with most commercial publishers producing books exactly as they had in the Tokugawa period, relying on woodblock printing for reproduction of text and images, and fukurotoji ("stab binding") or orihon (folding album) formats for binding. Early translations of western works, for example, were typically released in fukurotoji formats, indistinguishable in appearance from concurrent productions of native writings. From the mid-1870s, publishers began to introduce western methods of technological reproduction such as metalplate printing and moveable type, accompanied by use of a different grade of paper, for some genres of books, while often retaining aspects of earlier productions such as color woodblock printed covers and frontispeces, on washi, for literary works. Such hybrid technology productions were common in the 1880s and 1890s, existing alongside books made entirely in traditional modes. Even with the fuller transition to western technologies for textual reproduction and binding, such as the "board book" (ボード本) or hardcover format introduced in these decades or the western-style internal bindings of the early twentieth century, full color woodblock print frontispieces, called kuchi-e (口絵) were still in high demand by the reading public, and remained a key feature of literary works. Such elements of traditional printing techniques gradually faded from the late Meiji and into the Taisho era, with traditional bindings and woodblock printing eventually coming to be used only for deluxe productions of artistic books, or modern reproductions of historically significant works.

=== Today ===
The modern Japanese book differs little from the western book in construction. However, most books are printed to be read top-to-bottom and right-to-left, which includes manga, a prominent part of Japanese culture today. The notable exception in arrangement is various technical books and textbooks, which tend to be printed according to the western model and are read left-to-right and top-to-bottom.

== See also ==
- Bunkobon
- Tankōbon
- Secret Belgian binding, a bookbinding method inspired by Japanese bookbinding.
