= Dallos =

1983 science fiction original video animation by Hisayuki Toriumi and Mamoru Oshii

- Dallos North American box art

ダロス (Darosu)
- Genre: Science fiction
- Created by: Hisayuki Toriumi
- Original video animation
- Directed by: Hisayuki Toriumi (uncredited); Mamoru Oshii
- Produced by: Yuji Nunokawa
- Written by: Hisayuki Toriumi; Mamoru Oshii
- Music by: Ichirō Nitta; Hiroyuki Namba
- Studio: Pierrot
- Licensed by: NA: Discotek Media
- Released: December 16, 1983 – August 5, 1984
- Runtime: 30 minutes
- Episodes: 4 + 1 special

Dallos (ダロス, Darosu) is a science fiction OVA series released in 1983. It was conceptualized by Hisayuki Toriumi, who also wrote the script and directed it with Mamoru Oshii. It is widely considered not only the first OVA released but also the first animated direct-to-video production release.

The storyline focuses on a rebellion on a Moon colony by settlers and a mysterious artifact called Dallos. The story and setting take influence from past works such as the 1966 novel The Moon Is a Harsh Mistress.

== Story ==
In the near future, humanity has drained the Earth of its resources. To sustain Earth's populace, mining colonies are created on the Moon to provide vital natural resources.

After generations of mistreatment from the Earth Federal Government, the colonists retaliate by performing acts of terrorism leading directly to a conflict with their overseers. A mysterious structure on the Moon called Dallos is worshipped by the colonists and gives them hope. A young colonist by the name of Shun Nonomura is caught into the fray as he joins the rebels, dramatically affecting the lives of those close to him with his actions. A generational divide between the younger natural-born colonists and their older compatriots arises as the allegiance to Earth as humanity's motherland is questioned.

== Cast ==
Cast
Character	Japanese
Narrator	Kouji Nakata
Shun Nonomura	Hideki Sasaki
Alex Leiger	Shuuichi Ikeda
Doug McCoy	Tesshou Genda
Rachel	Rumiko Ukai
Taizou Nonomura	Mizuho Suzuki
Melinda Hearst	Yoshiko Sakakibara
Max	Hideyuki Tanaka
Erna	Miki Fujimura
Consul General	Yasuo Muramatsu
Chief of Public Safety	Daisuke Gouri

The compilation film Dallos Special has English and Spanish dubs, but of unknown actors. The Japanese cast is retained.

The characters Alex Leiger, Doug McCoy, and Erna are sometimes known as Alex Riger, Dog McCoy, and Elna; respectively.

== Episodes ==
No.	Title	Original release date
1	"Remember Bartholomew"; Transliteration: "Rimenbā・Bāsoromyū" (Japanese: リメンバー・バーソロミュー)	December 16, 1983
2	"The Order to Destroy Dallos!"; Transliteration: "Darosu Hakai Shirei!" (Japanese: ダロス破壊指令!)	January 28, 1984
3	"Raising in the Sea of Nostalgia, Act I"; Transliteration: "Bōkyō no Umi ni Tatsu ACT.I" (Japanese: 望郷の海に起つ ACT.I)	April 29, 1984
4	"Raising in the Sea of Nostalgia, Act II"; Transliteration: "Bōkyō no Umi ni Tatsu ACT.II" (Japanese: 望郷の海に起つ ACT.II)	July 5, 1984

The four episodes were edited together to create the 85 minute-long film Dallos Special in 1985.

== Release ==
In 1991, Celebrity Home Entertainment released the Toho English dub of Dallos Special on VHS under the title Battle for Moon Station Dallos, but it was censored. This feature version was later reissued in 1995 by Best Film and Video Corp simply titled Dallos. Despite this, this Special was dubbed in its entirety, since in the complete Spanish dub, shouts in English can be heard, which are not present in this censored version. Discotek Media released the OVA series in uncut form on DVD in 2014. The streaming platform Crunchyroll added the OVA series to its catalog in May 2015. On August 3, 2024, Discotek announced a Blu-ray release of the OVA to be released in September 2024.

In Spain, it was distributed, licensed, and dubbed onto VHS format by Chiqui Video during the 1980s.
