= Bokkō (novel) =

1991 Japanese historical fiction novel

- Author: Ken'ichi Sakemi
- Original title: 墨攻
- Language: Japanese
- Genre: Historical fiction
- Publisher: Shinchosha
- Publication date: March 1, 1991
- Publication place: Japan
- Media type: Print (Tankōbon & Bunkobon)
- Pages: 195
- ISBN: 978-4-10-375103-8

Bokkō (墨攻; lit. 'Mohist Attack') is a Japanese historical fiction novel written by Ken'ichi Sakemi, published in 1991. It was nominated for the 104th Naoki Prize and won the Atsushi Nakajima Memorial Prize for the 50th anniversary of his death in 1992.

A manga adaptation was serialized from 1992 to 1996, and a film premiered in 2006. Studio Ghibli considered an anime film with Mamoru Oshii as director around 1991, and animator Katsuya Kondō also created imageboards, but the plan was abandoned midway through due to a dispute between Oshii and Hayao Miyazaki.

== Plot ==
The story takes place in China during the Warring States period. Liang is a small province between the great powers Zhao and Yan, and was about to be invaded by Zhao. The King of Liang asks the Mohists for help as a last resort. The Mohists were a unique group of thinkers who preached "non-war and love" and went wherever to help defend castles and towns if required.

The people of Liang had hoped that the Mohists would send a group of excellent military strategists to defeat Zhao, but only one strategist, named Kakuri, appeared. The Mohist organization founded by Mozi was then under the third generation of leadership, and corrupt. Under such circumstances, Kakuri, loyal to the Mohists' ideology, defied the leader's orders and rode alone to defend the walled city, Liangcheng. None of the lord's clans, chief vassals, or the peasants accommodated in the citadel have any experience in warfare, nor does he have the cooperation of the Mohists. Against this backdrop, Kakuri leads thousands of villagers with amazing strategy and skill to defeat the large army of Zhao, consisting of over ten thousand professional soldiers.

== Publications ==
- Tankōbon (Shinchosha, March 1, 1991) - ISBN 978-4-10-375103-8
- Bunkobon (Shincho Bunko, June 29, 1994) - ISBN 978-4-10-128112-4
- Bunkobon (Bunshun Bunko, April 10, 2014) - ISBN 978-4-16-790071-7

== Adaptations ==
=== Manga ===
A manga adaptation was serialized in Big Comic (Shogakukan) from 1992 to 1996 and won the 40th Shogakukan Manga Award in 1995.

=== Film ===
A China-Korea-Japan-Hong Kong joint film was produced in 2006 based on the manga version.
