= Jade Cocoon: Story of the Tamamayu =

1998 video game

- North American packaging artwork
- Developer: Genki
- Publishers: JP: Genki; WW: Crave Entertainment
- Director: Gaku Tamura
- Producer: Kenji Shimizu
- Writer: Gaku Tamura
- Composer: Kimitaka Matsumae
- Platform: PlayStation
- Release: JP: December 3, 1998; NA: July 27, 1999; EU: November 1999
- Genre: Role-playing
- Modes: Single-player, multiplayer

Jade Cocoon: Story of the Tamamayu (Japanese: 玉繭物語, Hepburn: Tamamayu Monogatari; lit. "The Story of the Jade Cocoon") is a role-playing video game developed by Genki exclusively for PlayStation. The game combines elements of role-playing video games and virtual pet management. It was developed by Genki in collaboration with Katsuya Kondō, character designer for the Studio Ghibli movies Kiki's Delivery Service and Ocean Waves.

== Gameplay ==
Jade Cocoon is set in a world where most of the land is covered in dense forest and populated by bizarre, mostly bug-like monsters called Minions. The only safe havens are small villages, one of which is the home of the protagonist, Levant. Levant is a young Cocoon Master, whose job is to capture and purify Minions. The Minions can then be used to fight and defend Levant, spun into silk for money, or fused with other Minions to form more powerful combinations. As Levant captures more minions, his "Capture Level" increases, allowing him to capture monsters more easily.

Fused minions take on physical characteristics of both their parent creatures, allowing the player to customize their appearance and abilities. Each minion has a collection of elemental attacks which can be passed from generation to generation. Strategy generally follows a rock/paper/scissors pattern (Wind beats Earth beats Water beats Fire beats Wind), as each wild Minion has an element (although fused Minions may have more than one).

=== The Eternal Corridor ===
After the main story is completed, the player may continue to play the game in a new area called The Eternal Corridor, which consists of a near-infinite area where new monsters that were unavailable in the main game can be found. Those areas are randomly generated "rooms", which are made of straight paths, occasionally dividing into two paths. Only one route leads to the end of the room. Once the player finds the "end" of the room they proceed to the next in the corridor. These randomly generated "rooms" supposedly go on indefinitely.

There are wild Minions residing in the Eternal Corridor. Their experience level increases as the player progresses through the corridor. This continues on and on thus making it harder to progress through the corridors. There are also boss-like Minions that can drop special "skins" to be applied to the player's Minions. Those skins have no purpose other than cosmetic.

The player can also have access to new items and equipment. However, the player is unable to access other areas in the game, and can become stuck in the corridor forever (hence it is recommended to keep a separate save file for this).

== Plot ==
Jade Cocoon is the story of Levant, a young man who lives in the town of Syrus. The silent protagonist is guided by the player on his quest to follow in his presumably dead father's footsteps to become a Cocoon Master. To do this, he must marry a Na'gi woman, and is betrothed to a girl named Mahbu (voiced by Michelle Ruff). On the day of a large festival in Syrus, the village is attacked by demons known as the Onibubu, which cause many villagers to fall into a deep slumber. An elderly Nagi woman, Garai, repels the Onibubu using Nagi magic before their curse affects everyone.

After a quick wedding ceremony, Levant is given the title of cocoon master and leaves to explore the surrounding forest to find a rare herb rumored to be able to lift the curse. He traverses four forests on his quest, the Beetle, Dragonfly, Spider, and Moth forests, which are populated with a variety of monsters known as minions (or just Divine Beasts) that Levant may capture into cocoons and tame. Throughout Levant's journey, his wife, Mahbu experiences treacherous ordeals called Nagi Brandings in order to soothe the souls of the minions the protagonist captures. On his quest he meets many others, such as Koris, the Blue Cocoon Master, Kikinak, the Bird Man, and Yamu, who assist him in saving the people of the village.

In a desperate attempt to save their village, the government of Syrus makes an attempt to sacrifice Garai to the Divine Tree, believing her to be the Goddess of sewing souls. Garai reveals herself to be the goddess, and ties the souls of the village to Levant, turning the people into stone. Levant makes one final journey into the gates of the Moth Forest to find the Temple of Kemuel, a place where he must go into the nether-realms to fight challenging inner demons and save his village once and for all and fulfill a prophecy.

== Development ==
=== Previews and demos ===
In April 1999, the US release of Jade Cocoon, still in its alpha stages, was previewed in Next Generation as part of its "NG Alphas" series. The following months, Jade Cocoon was previewed in the Game Informer magazine twice, in issues 73 and 75, then reviewed after release in issue 76. It was then reviewed in the September issue of NextGen.

A playable demo disk of Jade Cocoon was included in the release of Shadow Madness, Crave's first game, two months before release. A month later, the game was previewed in the 21st issue of Official U.S. PlayStation Magazine, then later reviewed in the 23rd issue, and featured on the issue's demo disk along with demos for Final Fantasy VIII, 3Xtreme, Tiny Tank, Macross VF-X2, Centipede, You Don't Know Jack, and Ultimate 8-Ball. A few months later, it was also reviewed in the 53rd issue of Official UK PlayStation Magazine, and featured on its demo disk.

=== Re-releases ===
Jade Cocoon was re-released on the PlayStation Network for PlayStation 3 and PlayStation Portable in June 2008 in Japan, but not in other regions. It was released the same day as Crash Team Racing and other games.

=== Sequels ===
A mobile phone direct sequel, titled Jade Cocoon Gaiden (玉繭物語 外伝, Tamamayu Monogatari Gaiden; lit. "The Story of the Jade Cocoon: Side Story"), was released in 1999 in Japan. It continues the story from the end of the game. A sequel, Jade Cocoon 2, was later released for the PlayStation 2 in 2001. The game takes place 100 years after the original, and changes a substantial number of elements, retaining only certain recurring characters and core concepts.

== Reception ==
Reception

Aggregate score
| Aggregator | Score |
|---|---|
| GameRankings | 73% |

Review scores
| Publication | Score |
|---|---|
| AllGame | 4/5 |
| CNET Gamecenter | 6/10 |
| Electronic Gaming Monthly | 6.25/10 (Note: Four critics of Electronic Gaming Monthly gave the game each a score of 6.5/10, 7/10, 5.5/10, and 6/10.) |
| Famitsu | 32/40 |
| Game Informer | 8/10 |
| GameRevolution | B− |
| GameSpot | 7.9/10 |
| IGN | 8.1/10 |
| Next Generation | 2/5 |
| PlayStation Official Magazine – UK | 6/10 |
| Official U.S. PlayStation Magazine | 4.5/5 |
| RPGFan | 78% |
| Dengeki PlayStation | 85/100, 90/100 |

The game received "average" reviews according to the review aggregation website GameRankings. Jeff Lundrigan of NextGen said, "If you're looking for a decent RPG, though, you're gonna be disappointed. There are so many side quests that the main story seems fragmented and puzzling at times. Although there's a very complicated mythology behind it all, nothing really means anything, and the characters don't generate much empathy. Worse, you wind up going through the exact same four areas twice, and it takes all of 13 hours to beat." In Japan, however, Famitsu gave it a score of 32 out of 40.

Reviews of Jade Cocoon praised its graphics, including the game's FMV anime cut-scenes and environment—which consisted of over 600 pre-rendered backgrounds—as well as its audio, sound effects, and simple interface. The game's deep monster breeding and merging system was also well regarded. However, the game was considered short alongside other RPGs of the time with a story of only 15 to 20 hours. Jade Cocoon was criticized for the inability to fight alongside monsters, and its Silent Hill-style control scheme, which makes it difficult to avoid battles with some monsters.
