= Hideki Mori =

Japanese manga artist

Hideki Mori (森 秀樹, Mori Hideki; born 3 April 1961 in Yonago, Tottori, Japan) is a Japanese manga artist. He made his professional debut in 1982 in Shōnen Sunday, after which he was chosen by Kazuo Koike to illustrate the continuation of Lone Wolf and Cub, Shin Lone Wolf and Cub. Mori is best known for his manga adaptation of Kenichi Sakemi's historical novel Bokkō, which was then adapted as the movie A Battle of Wits. Mori received the 1995 Shogakukan Manga Award for general manga for Bokkō. His other works include Umizuru and Aozora Shot, and the illustrations for Kajō (written by Kazuo Koike). In 2013, published Shishi, a manga based on the life of Miyamoto Musashi.

He is noted for his detailed art in a realistic style.

He is not to be confused with the animator with the same name who worked for Toei Animation during the 1960s and 1970s.
