= Kōkyū Shōsetsu =

Japanese fantasy novel

- Author: Ken'ichi Sakemi
- Original title: 後宮小説
- Language: Japanese
- Genre: Fantasy
- Publisher: Shinchosha
- Publication date: 1989
- Publication place: Japan
- Media type: Print (Hardcover & Bunkobon)
- Pages: 252
- ISBN: 978-4-103-75101-4

Kōkyū Shōsetsu (後宮小説; lit. 'Inner palace Novel') is a Japanese fantasy novel written by Ken'ichi Sakemi, published in 1989. It was Sakemi's first novel and was released in two forms: hardcover and bunkobon.

The novel won the 1st Japan Fantasy Novel Award in 1989 and was adapted into the 1990 anime television film under the title Like the Clouds, Like the Wind.

== Plot ==
Set in a fictional country reminiscent of early 17th century China, the novel depicts the bizarre fate of Ginga, a young girl who volunteers to be a candidate for the new emperor's queen.

In the first year of the Kai calendar, candidates for the position of queen were gathered from all over the country to the inner palace of the new emperor of the Sokan Empire, who succeeded his predecessor who had died during sex. Ginga, a 14-year-old country girl from Oda Prefecture, thought the inner palace would be a fun place to study and have three meals and a nap, so she volunteered to be a candidate for queen. She was successful in her bid to enter the palace. Fearless Ginga achieved excellent grades in eccentric lectures at the women's university, and succeeded in obtaining the throne of the lawful wife. However, at the most inopportune moment, a rebel uprising broke out, and Ginga was forced to organize an inner palace unit to fight the rebels.

== Publications ==
- Hardcover (Shinchosha, March 5, 1989) - ISBN 4-10-375101-0
- Bunkobon (Shincho Bunko, April 25, 1993) - ISBN 4-10-128111-4

== Adaptations ==
=== Anime ===
It was adapted into an anime television film and broadcast on the Nippon Television Network System on March 21, 1990.
