= Jade Cocoon 2 =

2001 video game

- Developer: Genki
- Publishers: JP: Genki; WW: Ubi Soft
- Producer: Kenji Shimizu
- Artist: Katsuya Kondō
- Composers: Kimitaka Matsumae; Manami Matsumae
- Platform: PlayStation 2
- Release: JP: August 30, 2001; NA: December 18, 2001; EU: June 14, 2002
- Genre: Role-playing
- Modes: Single-player, multiplayer

Jade Cocoon 2 (玉繭物語2 ～滅びの蟲～, Tamamayu Monogatari Tsū ～Horobi no Mushi～; literally "The Story of the Jade Cocoon 2: Insect of Destruction") is a role-playing video game developed by Genki exclusively for PlayStation 2. It is the sequel to Jade Cocoon: Story of the Tamamayu. The game features a full 3D polygonal world, 200 cutscenes, and full voice-overs.

== Gameplay ==
Jade Cocoon 2 centers its gameplay around monster collection, breeding, and strategic combat. Players take on the role of Kahu, a young aspirant Cocoon Master, navigating elemental forest lairs in search of orbs that will save him from a parasitic curse. The game features an intricate breeding system and battle mechanics. With over 200 monster species and billions of possible combinations, players fuse Divine Beasts aligned to elemental types—Fire, Water, Earth, and Wind—each offering distinct traits like healing, protection, or status effects. Combat unfolds on a circular grid where Kahu commands up to eight monsters, strategically positioned across elemental quadrants. Attacks are determined by the alignment and skills of beasts in each sector.

== Plot ==
Jade Cocoon 2's plot occurs 100 years after the events in the original Jade Cocoon. The time of the Nagi people and "cocoon masters" has passed. New "cocoon masters" are now cited as "beasthunters" and are the prominent force of monster raising, with the player playing one named Kahu who visits the Temple of Kemuel in the hopes of becoming a beasthunter and having adventures like the old cocoon masters he's idolized. However, Kahu encounters trouble during his license exam required to become a full-fledged beast-hunter. He encounters a young fairy named Nico, who leaves Kahu cursed, and he's given a very short time to live before his body is consumed by evil. Kemuel Temple's resident guardian, Levant - the hero of the original Jade Cocoon - offers Kahu a chance to heal himself. By utilizing the four magical orbs found in the heart of the elemental forests and a dark lute, Levant will be able to save Kahu's life. Kahu now sets off on his adventure, to save himself and eventually the world. Other characters from the first Jade Cocoon also appear, like Kikinak, who became a rich shopkeeper thanks to Levant. A statue of Mahbu, the Nagi Maiden, can also be seen at the room where Levant is.

== Development ==
The game was developed in more than 2 years with a team of 40 people. It was one of the first games on the PlayStation 2 to use the console's hard drive for faster load times.

== Reception ==
Reception

Aggregate score
Aggregator	Score
Metacritic	76/100

Review scores
Publication	Score
Electronic Gaming Monthly	7.67/10
Famitsu	31/40
Game Informer	8.25/10
GamePro	4.5/5
GameSpot	8.1/10
GameSpy	70%
GameZone	8.4/10
IGN	7.9/10
Official U.S. PlayStation Magazine	3.5/5
PlayStation: The Official Magazine	7/10

The game received "generally favorable reviews", a bit more positive than the first Jade Cocoon, according to the review aggregation website Metacritic. In Japan, Famitsu gave it a score of 31 out of 40.
