= Like the Clouds, Like the Wind =

1990 animated television film

- Japanese cover of Like the Clouds, Like the Wind DVD

雲のように 風のように (Kumo no yō ni Kaze no yō ni)
- Genre: Fantasy
- Created by: Ken'ichi Sakemi
- Anime television film
- Directed by: Hisayuki Toriumi
- Produced by: Tooru Horikoshi; Minoru Oono; Yoshitaka Suzuki
- Written by: Akira Miyazaki
- Music by: Haruhiko Marutani
- Studio: Studio Pierrot
- Licensed by: NA: Discotek Media
- Released: March 21, 1990
- Runtime: 80 minutes

Like the Clouds, Like the Wind (Japanese: 雲のように 風のように, Hepburn: Kumo no yō ni Kaze no yō ni) is a Japanese anime television film produced by Studio Pierrot. An adaptation of the 1989 novel Kōkyū Shōsetsu by Ken'ichi Sakemi. It was broadcast on the Nippon Television Network System on March 21, 1990 (Vernal Equinox Day).

== Plot ==
Set in a fictional country dynasty reminiscent of early 17th century China, the story follows the adventures of Ginga, a young girl who volunteers to be the wife of the new Emperor.

Ginga is a simple—yet energetic—country girl, living with her father far from the capital city of the empire. When she learns of an opportunity to become a concubine of the young new Emperor, with the possibility of getting a regular food supply in the bargain, Ginga convinces her father to let her go. Once there, she meets all of the other potential head wives, each of whom have various reasons for being there. All of them must learn to read and write, learn the history of their country, and learn the proper mannerisms for being in the royal court.

Ginga's enthusiasm tends to get her in trouble more often than not, but it works to her advantage when they learn that the former emperor's head wife, who is not the mother of the current emperor, is plotting treachery against the new emperor, and that a rebellion is headed toward the capital.

== Cast ==
- Ginga: Ryōko Sano
- Koryūn: Emiya Ichikawa
- Kōyō: Yō Inoue
- Seshaamin: Yōko Asagami
- Tamyūn: Atsuko Takahata
- Kakuto: Kinto Tamura
- Kikkyō: Yūji Mitsuya
- Iryūda (Heishō): Nobuaki Fukuda
- Konton: Akiji Kobayashi
- Empress Kin: Ikuko Tani
- Taruto-baba: Hisako Kyōda
- Mano: Kōichi Kitamura
- Ino: Yōsuke Akimoto
- Narrator: Tadashi Nakamura
- Atsushi Ii
- Tomie Kataoka
- Eken Mine
- Tetsuo Mizutori
- Midori Nakazawa
- Akemi Shinohara
- Masaaki Tsukada
- Akiko Yajima

== Production ==
Like the Clouds, Like the Wind is an anime adaptation of Ken'ichi Sakemi's debut novel Kōkyū Shōsetsu, which won the first grand prize of the Japan Fantasy Novel Award, and was produced and broadcast as part of the 20th anniversary project of Mitsui Real Estate Sales Co., Ltd. (now Mitsui Fudosan Realty Co., Ltd.).

The film had its premier broadcast on March 21, 1990, during the vernal equinox national holiday, and was shown in an unprecedented commercial-free presentation. It was released on VHS video and laserdisc shortly after broadcast, and on Region 2 DVD in 2002. Then it was released on Blu-ray in HD remastered video in 2021.

For the anime adaptation, the characters' settings were changed and some episodes and descriptions were omitted in consideration of the wide age range of viewers.

Hisayuki Toriumi, known for his work on Science Ninja Team Gatchaman, was the director, and Akira Miyazaki, who has worked on many anime in the World Masterpiece Theater series as well as live-action films, was the scriptwriter. Many staff members involved in the Studio Ghibli productions of the time, including Katsuya Kondō, who designed characters for Kiki's Delivery Service, participated in the production of the film, and its distinctive visuals were talked about in Japan at the time as being reminiscent of Ghibli. It was for some time inaccurately understood to be produced by Studio Ghibli outside Japan, due to the presence of Ghibli staff and the first fan translation mistaking screenwriter Akira Miyazaki for Hayao Miyazaki.

Kumo Kaze, as it is sometimes called, is currently licensed in North America by Discotek Media who subsequently released it on DVD and Blu-ray.

== Music ==
The film score was composed by Haruhiko Maruya.

=== Theme song ===
Kumo no yō ni Kaze no yō ni

Lyrics: Anju Mana
Composed by: Tetsurō Kugizaki
Arranged by: Etsuko Yamakawa
Vocals: Ryōko Sano
