= Ken'ichi Sakemi =

Japanese writer (1963–2023)

- 酒見 賢一
- Born: November 26, 1963; Kurume, Fukuoka Prefecture, Japan
- Died: November 7, 2023 (aged 59)
- Education: Aichi University, Faculty of Letters, Department of Philosophy, Major in Eastern philosophy
- Writing career
- Genres: Historical fiction, Fantasy, Science fiction
- Notable works: Kōkyū Shōsetsu (1989); Bokkō (1991); Rōkō ni Ari (1992)

Ken'ichi Sakemi (酒見 賢一, Sakemi Ken'ichi; November 26, 1963 – November 7, 2023) was a Japanese writer.

Sakemi is known for his novels with Chinese themes. And his work is renowned for his unbridled imagination, based on Chinese history but not restricted by it. His works have attracted a lot of attention from other fields and have been adapted into other formats, including manga, anime, and films.

== Life and career ==
Ken'ichi Sakemi was born in Kurume, Fukuoka Prefecture. In 1988 he graduated from Aichi University, Faculty of Letters, Department of Philosophy with a major in Eastern philosophy.

In 1989, he won the 1st Japan Fantasy Novel Award for Kōkyū Shōsetsu, and published it as his first novel by Shinchosha. The novel was also nominated for the 102nd Naoki Prize. The following year, this novel made into the anime television film Like the Clouds, Like the Wind.

In 1992, he won the Atsushi Nakajima Memorial Prize for Bokkō and Rōkō ni ari. Bokkō was nominated again for the Naoki Award, and was subsequently adapted into a manga and a live-action film. As for Bokkō, Studio Ghibli once considered making an anime film directed by Mamoru Oshii around 1991, and even created imageboards by Katsuya Kondō, but the plan fell through. With Kondo, he has also worked on an unfinished manga called D'arc: Jan-nu Daruku Den.

In 2000, he won the Jiro Nitta Literary Award for Shūkōtan.

Sakemi died on November 7, 2023, at the age of 59 due to respiratory failure.

== Style ==
Sakemi's first novel was a fantasy set in a fictional dynasty similar to China's, but since then he has increasingly used real Chinese history as his subject matter. Nevertheless, he is renowned for his unrestrained imagination, while keeping historical facts in mind. Beyond China relations, he has also published works such as the military science fiction Seibo no butai and the Victorian-set Katarite no Jijō.

At the time of the 1989 publication of Kōkyū Shōetsu, few other such works were set in a fictional empire in the Chinese style, with the emperor, the inner palace (residences of the consorts), officials and eunuchs as the prescribed setting. This led to the creation of many later works that were similarly set in a world with Chinese culture and customs, but with a free-flowing storyline that could be about anything and everything, without regard to historical fact. The fact that that novel won the first Grand Prize also determined the unique character of the Japan Fantasy Novel Award, which has some fantasy, some horror, some speculative novel and some experimental fiction. He influenced later writers such as Riku Onda. His death brought him renewed attention as a writer who pioneered the subsequent Japanese fiction scene, which flourished with Chinese dynastic-style fantasy and mystery.

== Awards and nominations ==
- 1989 – Winner of the 1st Japan Fantasy Novel Award: Kōkyū Shōsetsu
- 1990 – Nominated for the 102nd Naoki Prize: Kōkyū Shōsetsu
- 1991 – Nominated for the 104th Naoki Prize: Bokkō
- 1992 – Winner of the Atsushi Nakajima Memorial Award 50 years after his death: Bokkō, Rōkō ni Ari, Pythagoras no Tabi
- 2000 – Winner of the 19th Jirō Nitta Literary Award: Shūkōtan

== Bibliography ==
=== Novels ===
- Kōkyū Shōsetsu (Inner palace Novel) (後宮小説), 1989
- Bokkō (Mohism Attacks) (墨攻), 1991
- Rōkō ni Ari (In the alley) (陋巷に在り), complete in 13 volumes, 1992–2002
- Dōtei (Male virgin) (童貞), 1995
- Katarite no Jijō (The Narrator's Circumstances) (語り手の事情), 1998
- Shūkōtan (Duke of Zhou) (周公旦), 1999
- Nakimushi Yowamushi Shokatsu Kōmei (Crybaby and cowardly, Zhuge Liang) (泣き虫弱虫諸葛孔明), complete in 5 volumes, 2004–2017

=== Short story collections ===
- Seibo no Butai (Troops of the Holy Mother) (聖母の部隊), 1991
- Pythagoras no Tabi (Pythagoras' Journey) (ピュタゴラスの旅), 1991
- Bunkai (Disassembly) (分解), 2010

=== Essays ===
- Chugoku Zatsuwa Chugoku-teki Shisou (Chinese Folklore, Chinese thought) (中国雑話 中国的思想), 2007

== Adaptations ==
=== Films ===
- A Battle of Wits, 2006
  A Japanese-Chinese-Korean co-production based on Hideki Mori's manga version, the film was released in Asia in 2006 and in Japan on February 3, 2007.

=== Anime ===
- Like the Clouds, Like the Wind (雲のように風のように), 1990
  An anime television film based on Kōkyū Shōsetsu, broadcast on Nippon Television Network System on March 21, 1990.

=== Manga ===
- Bokkō (Mohism Attacks) (墨攻), (Original story by Ken'ichi Sakemi, Illustration by Hideki Mori, scenario cooperation by Sentarō Kubota), complete in 11 volumes
  A manga based on Bokkō. It was serialized in Big Comic from 1992 to 1996. It became an original storyline along the way, expanding on ideas from the novel.
- D'arc Jan-nu Daruku Den (D'arc: Biography of Jeanne d'Arc) (D'arc ジャンヌ・ダルク伝), (Story by Ken'ichi Sakemi, Art by Katsuya Kondō), up to 2 volumes
  Original manga work without a novel as a basis. It was serialized in Animage from the August 1994 issue to the August 1995 issue, and then stopped. Unfinished.
- Rōkō ni Ari-Gankai Denki (In the Alley-The Legend of Yan Hui) (陋巷に在り-顔回伝奇), (Original story: Ken'ichi Sakemi, Manga: Jun Hanyunyū), complete in 3 volumes
  A manga based on Rōkō ni Ari. It was serialized in the monthly web comic magazine "Digicomi Shincho com2" from 2007.
- Nakimushi Yowamushi Shokatsu Kōmei (Crybaby and cowardly, Zhuge Liang) (泣き虫弱虫諸葛孔明), (Original story: Ken'ichi Sakemi, Manga: Tabasa Iori), complete in 3 volumes
  A manga based on Nakimushi Yowamushi Shokatsu Kōmei. It was serialized in Monthly Big Comic Spirits from the December 2017 issue to the July 2019 issue.
