= Katsuya Kondō =

Japanese manga artist

- Born: 近藤 勝也; June 2, 1963 (age 63); Ehime Prefecture, Japan
- Education: Studio Annapuru, Studio Ghibli
- Known for: Animation
- Notable work: Kiki's Delivery Service, Like the Clouds, Like the Wind, Jade Cocoon: Story of the Tamamayu
- Movement: Anime

Katsuya Kondō (近藤 勝也, Kondō Katsuya; born June 2, 1963 in Ehime Prefecture, Japan) is a Japanese manga artist, character designer, animator and animation director. He is best known for his character design work on the Studio Ghibli films Kiki's Delivery Service and Ocean Waves, as well as the PlayStation game Jade Cocoon. His character designs are considered the epitome of the Studio Ghibli style.

After graduating from high school, he began working for Osamu Dezaki and Akio Sugino at their Studio Annapuru. Under the direction of Shinji Ōtsuka, Kondō worked as a key animator of the TV anime series Cat's Eye. He then worked as a free agent on such shows as The Mighty Orbots, Rainbow Brite and Disney's Adventures of the Gummi Bears. His first work with Studio Ghibli was as a key animator on Castle in the Sky. After working on the Gainax film The Wings of Honneamise and the OVAs Devilman and Meikyū Bukken File 538, Kondō began to be known for the high quality of his work.

Kondō collaborated with Ken'ichi Sakemi on a manga retelling of the Joan of Arc story, as well as doing the character designs for the Jade Cocoon video game series. He also collaborated with Sakemi by creating the character designs for the 1990 NTV TV movie Like the Clouds, Like the Wind (based on Sakemi's novel Kōkyū Monogatari), which tells the story of a young country girl who is chosen to become one of the Emperor's concubines. He also worked with Tomomi Mochizuki on the NHK Minna no Uta music video titled Kaze no Tōri Michi, produced by Ajia-do Animation Works for Sayuri Horishita. In 2007, he was announced as the supervising animator of the Studio Ghibli film Ponyo on the Cliff by the Sea. He also wrote the lyrics for the film's theme song.

== Works ==
Listed alphabetically by year, with oldest at top.

=== Animation ===
- Mighty Orbots (1984, character design)
- Cat's Eye (1985, key animation)
- Disney's Adventures of the Gummi Bears (1985, key animation)
- Castle in the Sky (1986, key animation)
- Twilight Q (1987, Character Design, Key Animation)
- The Wings of Honneamise (1987, key animation)
- Devilman (1987, 1990, OVA, key animation)
- My Neighbor Totoro (1988, original design)
- Kiki's Delivery Service (1989, animation director, character design)
- Like the Clouds, Like the Wind (1990, animation director, character design)
- Rainbow Brite (1990, key animation)
- Only Yesterday (1991, animation director)
- Porco Rosso (1992, key animation)
- Ocean Waves (1993, animation director, character design)
- Pom Poko (1994, key animation)
- Princess Mononoke (1997, key animation)
- My Neighbors the Yamadas (1999, key animation)
- The Aurora (2000, 2D character design)
- Howl's Moving Castle (2004, animation supervisor, key animation)
- Kaze no Tōri Michi (2004, music video, key animation)
- Dennō Coil (2007, key animation)
- Ponyo (2008, Character Design, Animation Director, Theme Song Lyrics, key animation, animation supervisor)
- The Secret World of Arrietty (2010, key animation)
- From Up on Poppy Hill (2011, animation director, character design)
- Ronja, the Robber's Daughter (TV series) (2014, character design)
- Zen - Grogu and Dust Bunnies (2022, director)
- Paris ni Saku Étoile (2026, original design)

=== Games ===
Kondō Katsuya Art Works, featuring artwork from both Jade Cocoon games.

- Jade Cocoon: Story of the Tamamayu (PlayStation) (1998, character design, original artwork)
- Jade Cocoon 2 (PlayStation 2) (2001, character design)

=== Books and manga ===
- Boku ga Suki na Hito e: Umi ga Kikoeru yori (ISBN 4195551714, 1993-05-31, ¥1200)
- D'arc: Histoire de Jeanne D'arc, by Kenichi Sakemi and Kondō, Tokuma Shoten
  - Volume 1: ISBN 4-19-770037-7, 1995-09-30, ¥950
  - Volume 2: ISBN 4-19-770048-2, 1996-09-30, ¥950
- "Kondō Katsuya Art Works: Tamamayu Monogatari & Tamamayu Monogatari 2 (ISBN 4758010064, March 2002, ¥3990)
