= Bunkobon =

Japanese small paperback book

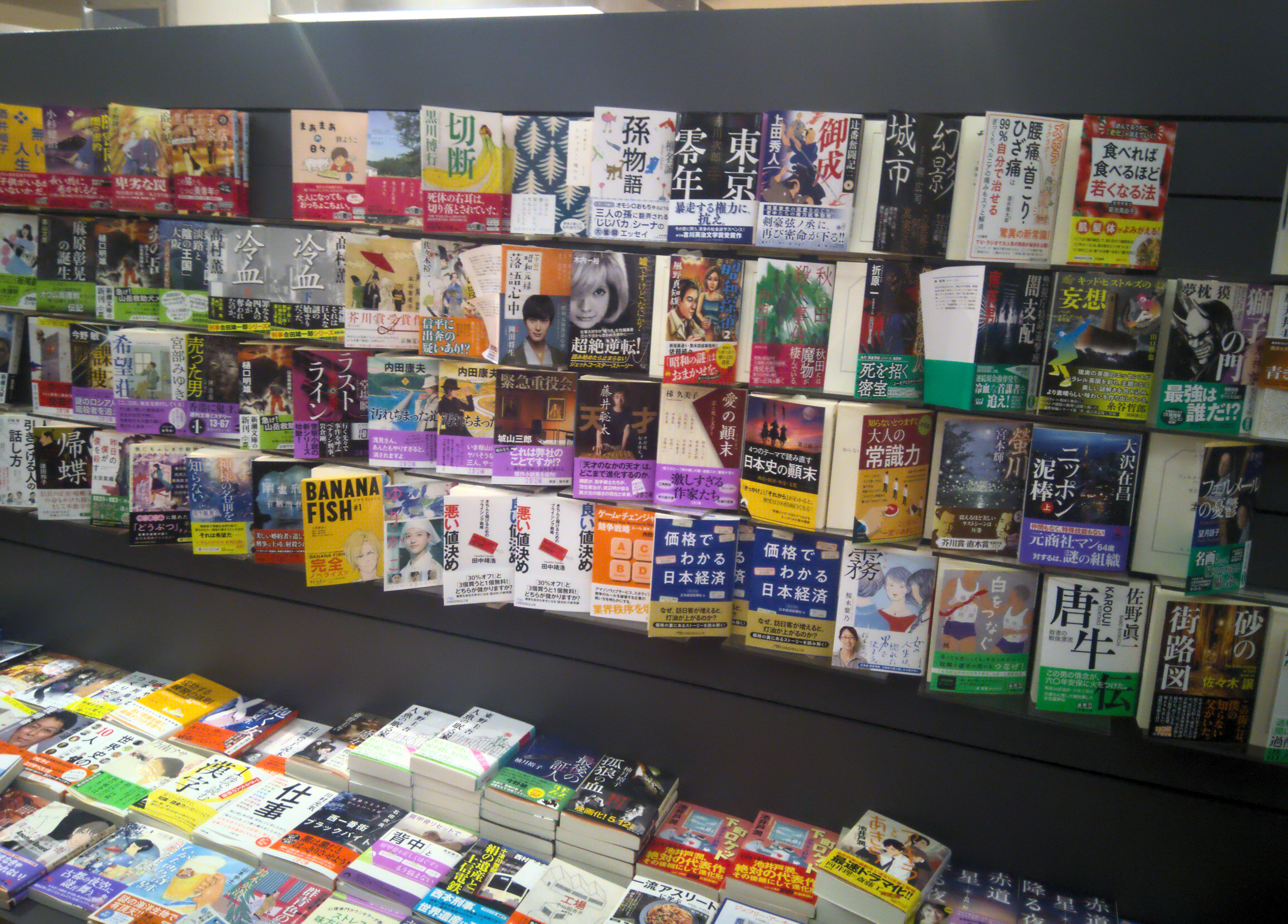
An assortment of bunkobon in a bookshop

In Japan, bunkobon (文庫本) are small-format paperback books, designed to be affordable and space-saving.

The great majority of bunkobon are A6 (105×148mm or 4.1"×5.8") in size. They are sometimes illustrated and like other Japanese paperbacks usually have a dust wrapper over a plain cover. Modern bunkobon can include bestsellers and works of scholarship alike and their pocketbook size make them useful while commuting. They are used for similar purposes as Western mass market paperbacks: generally for cheaper editions of books which have already been published as hardbacks. However, they are typically printed on durable paper and durably bound, and some works are initially published in bunkobon format.

Bunkobon take their name from the publisher Iwanami Shoten, which, in 1927, launched the Iwanami Bunko (Iwanami Library), a series of international works aimed "to bring the classics of new and old, east and west to the broadest possible audience." The original Iwanami Bunko series is credited for transforming books in Japan into affordable, mass-market commodities.

The bunkobon format began to flourish during the late 1920s, following the development of printing technology able to mass-produce cheap books and magazines. During this period, the Japanese industry further developed the bunkobon format based on German Reclam's Universal-Bibliothek book formats.

== See also ==
- Japanese books
- Tankōbon – Many manga are reprinted in bunkoban (or "bunko edition") format.
- Reclam – German publishing house. Their "universal library" (Universal-Bibliothek) series was a model for Iwanami Bunko and started in 1927.
