= Original video animation =

Anime designed for release to home video

Original video animation (Japanese: オリジナル・ビデオ・アニメーション, Hepburn: orijinaru bideo animēshon), abbreviated as OVA and sometimes as OAV (original animation video), are Japanese animated films and special episodes of a series made specially for release in home video formats without prior showings on television or in theaters, though the first part of an OVA series may be broadcast for promotional purposes. OVA titles were originally made available on VHS, later becoming more popular on LaserDisc and eventually DVD. Starting in 2008, the term OAD (original animation DVD) began to refer to DVD releases published bundled with their source-material manga.

== Format ==
Like anime made for television broadcast, OVAs are divided into episodes. OVA media (tapes, laserdiscs or DVDs) usually contain just one episode each. Episode length varies from title to title: each episode may run from a few minutes to two hours or more. An OVA series can run anywhere from a single episode to dozens of episodes in length.

Many anime series, such as Little Witch Academia, Tenchi Muyo!, and Gunbuster first appeared as OVAs, and later grew to become television series or movies. OVAs are also released as stand-alone pieces of media or special/notable compilations or movies of ongoing franchises, like Thus Spoke Rohan Kishibe, Mobile Suit Gundam: The Origin, or Hyperdimension Neptunia: The Animation.

Producers sometimes make other OVA releases as sequels, side stories, music-video collections, or bonus episodes that continue existing as television series or films. Examples of this include Hellsing Ultimate, Rurouni Kenshin: Trust & Betrayal, and Tenchi Muyo! Ryo-Ohki.

The consumer base for OVAs in Japan is mostly males; Bandai Visual, in a 2004 news release, said that about 50% of the customers who had bought their anime DVDs in the past fell into the category of 25 to 40-year-old men, with only 13% of purchasers women, all ages included. Nikkei Business Publications also said in a news-release that mainly 25 to 40-year-old adults bought anime DVDs.

Some OVAs based on television series (and especially those based on manga) may provide closure to the plot– closure not present in the original series, due to budget or time constraints in the original broadcast run, such as Black Lagoon: Roberta's Blood Trail.

== History ==
OVAs originated during the early 1980s. As the VCR became a commonplace in Japanese homes, the anime industry grew. Demand for anime became so massive that consumers would go to video stores to buy new animation outright. While people in the United States used the phrase "direct-to-video" as a pejorative for works that could not make it onto television or movie screens, in Japan direct-to-video became common practice.

The earliest known attempt to release an OVA was The Green Cat in 1983, although it cannot count as the first OVA: there is currently no evidence that the VHS tape became available immediately and the series remained incomplete. The first OVA to be billed as such was 1983's Dallos, released by Bandai. Other companies were quick to pick up on the idea, and the mid-to-late 1980s saw the market flooded with OVAs. During this time, most OVA series were new, stand-alone titles.

During Japan's economic bubble, production companies were more than willing to spontaneously decide to make a one- or two-part OVA in the 1980s. They paid money to anime studios, who would then quickly create an OVA to be released to rental shops. Judging from sales, should a longer series be deemed feasible, TV networks paid for most of the production costs of the entire series.

As the Japanese economy worsened in the 1990s, the creation of new OVA titles slowed down. Production of OVAs continued, but in smaller numbers. Many anime TV series ran 13 episodes rather than the traditional 26-episodes per season. Studios often designed new titles to be released to TV if they approached these lengths. In addition, the rising popularity of cable and satellite TV networks (with their typically less strict censorship) allowed the public to see direct broadcasts of many new titles. Therefore, many violent and risque series became regular TV series, when previously those titles would have been OVAs. During this time, most OVA content was limited to that related to existing and established titles.

In 2000 and later, a new OVA trend began. Producers released many TV series without normal broadcasts of all of the episodes—but releasing some episodes on the DVD release of the series.

== See also ==
- Direct-to-video
- Original net animation
