= Monster Kingdom =

Monster Kingdom can refer to:

- Monster Kingdom: Jewel Summoner, a 2006 PlayStation Portable video game
- Folklore (video game), a 2007 PlayStation 3 video game (code named Monster Kingdom: Unknown Realms)
