= Kenji Kawai =

Japanese music composer and arranger (born 1957)

Kenji Kawai 川井 憲次
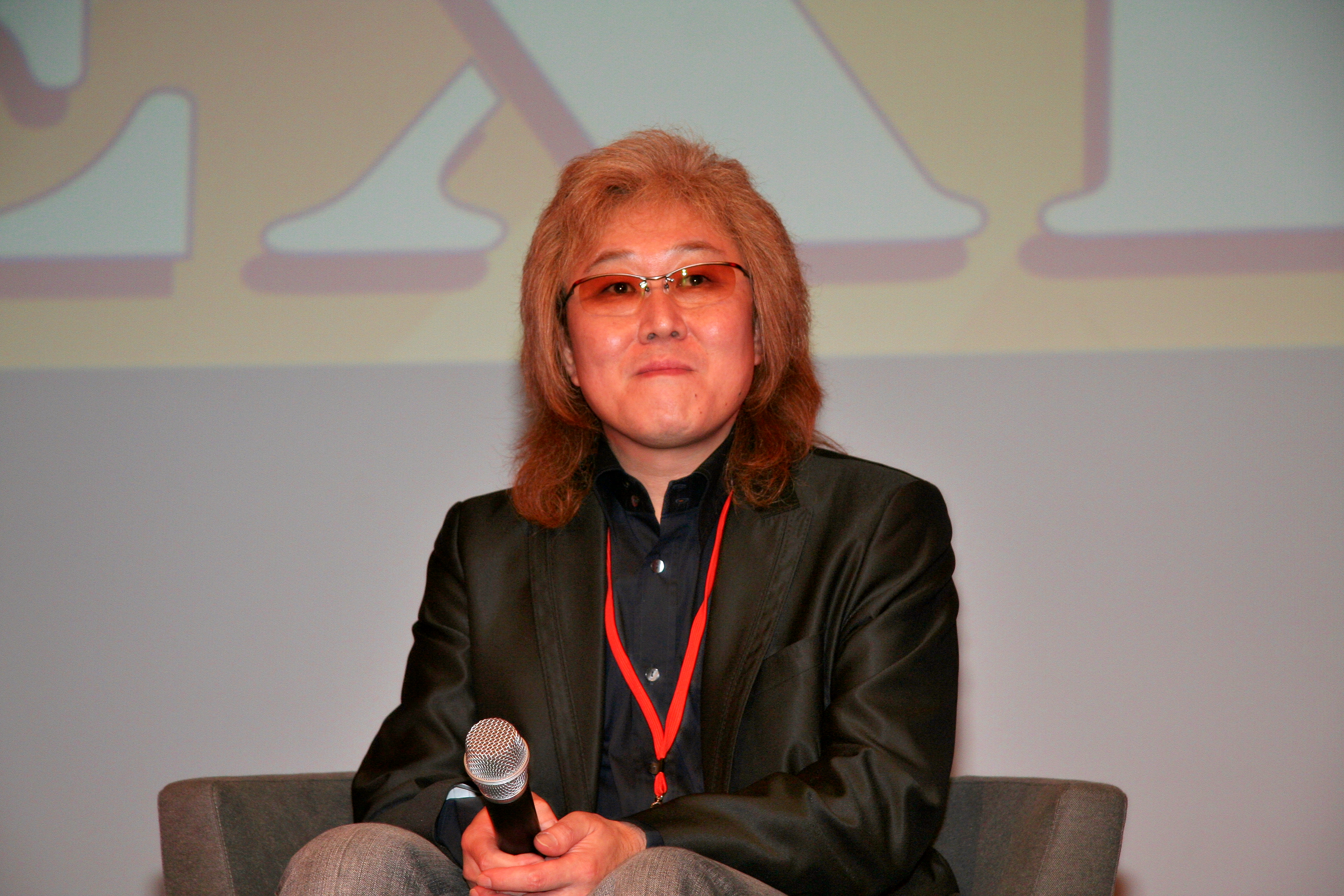
- Kawai in 2007

Background information
- Also known as: Kaai (かーいさん, Kāi-san)
- Born: April 23, 1957 (age 69); Shinagawa, Japan
- Genres: Film score Electronic rock Instrumental rock
- Occupations: Composer; arranger
- Instruments: Guitar; keyboard; drums
- Years active: 1980–present
- Website: www.kenjikawai.com

Kenji Kawai (川井 憲次, Kawai Kenji; born April 23, 1957) is a Japanese music composer and arranger. Known as one of the biggest names in the soundtrack world, he has worked on a wide range of mixed media productions, including anime, TV shows, films, video games and ice shows. Among his credits are Toei's: Kamen Rider Heisei Generations Forever, Tsui Hark's Seven Swords and Young Detective Dee: Rise of the Sea Dragon; Wilson Yip's Ip Man; Mamoru Oshii's films: The Red Spectacles, StrayDog: Kerberos Panzer Cops, Ghost in the Shell, Mobile Police Patlabor and Assault Girls. He also worked on the OVA and TV anime adaptations of: Vampire Princess Miyu, The Sky Crawlers and Avalon; the anime adaptations of Rumiko Takahashi's Ranma ½ and Maison Ikkoku; the live-action adaptation of Gantz and Hideo Nakata's films: Ring, Ring 2, Chaos, Dark Water and Kaidan.

His nephew, Hidehiro Kawai, is a bassist in Fox Capture Plan, an instrumental band.

== Career ==
After dropping out of a nuclear engineering program at Tokai University, Kawai began studying music at Shobi Music Academy. However, he dropped out after half a year. With a few friends, he created the band Muse, playing fusion rock and participating in music competitions. Through competing in such contests, the band members became technically competent to enter the music industry and decided to part ways.

After leaving Muse, Kawai began composing music for commercials in his home studio. While recording music for radio actor and voice actor Yūji Mitsuya, he met music director Naoko Asari, who advised him to compose anime soundtracks. Some of his work for anime soundtracks can be found in Ranma ½ and Ghost in the Shell. According to Kawai, he is not good at creating music from nothing, as he draws sounds from the visuals of the works. In the majority of cases, the images of the anime are not yet created, so he creates music when referencing storyboard visuals.

Following his success as an anime movies music composer, he became involved in live action movies. He contributed music to horror films: Ring, Ring 2, Dark Water, Japanese-Polish science-fiction film Avalon, the Hong Kong film Seven Swords and in the 2006 live action film Death Note.

Kawai has worked on several projects with director Mamoru Oshii (both Headgear members) and has written scores for all of Hideo Nakata's films. Kawai's music has received the Annie Award and Hong Kong Film Award. In 2005, Ghost in The Shell 2: Innocence he was nominated for an Annie Award.

For the music found in Seven Swords and A Battle of Wits he was nominated for Best Original Film Score Awards at both the 25th and 26th Hong Kong Film Awards in 2006 and 2007.

In 2019 he composed the music for the storytelling ice show Hyoen – Like the moonlight, which was based on the novel The Tale of Genji, starring Japanese figure skater, Olympic bronze medallist and former world champion Daisuke Takahashi in the title role.

== Works ==
=== Anime/television ===
Year	Title	Notes
1986	Cosmos Pink Shock	TV Movie
1986	Maison Ikkoku	
1987	Devilman – The Birth	OVA
1988	Mobile Police Patlabor	OVA
1988	Vampire Princess Miyu	OVA
1989	Patlabor: The TV Series	
1989	Ranma 1/2	
1989	Patlabor: The Movie	Movie
1989	Gosenzo-sama Banbanzai!	OVA
1989	Ranma 1/2: Nettohen	
1990	Devilman – The Demon Bird	OVA
1990	Project A-ko	OVA
1990	Karakuri Kengō Den Musashi Lord	
1990	Kyatto Ninden Teyandee	
1990	MAROKO	
1991	Burn Up!	OVA
1991	Ranma 1/2: Big Trouble in Nekonron, China	OVA
1991	Mermaid Forest	OVA
1991	Demon Warrior Luna Varga	OVA
1992	Zetsuai 1989	OVA
1992	Hime-chan's Ribbon	
1993	Ranma ½ OVA	OVA
1993	The Irresponsible Captain Tylor	OVA, TV Series
1993	Patlabor 2: The Movie	Movie
1994	Blue Seed	
1994	Iczer Girl Iczelion	OVA
1995	Princess Minerva	OVA
1995	Ghost in The Shell	Movie
1996	Sorcerer Hunters	
1996	Baby and Me	
1997	Hyper Police	
1997	Vampire Princess Miyu	
1999	You're Under Arrest THE MOVIE	
1999	Dai-Guard	Movie
2001	Geisters – Fractions of Earth	
2001	Zaion: I Wish You Were Here	OVA
2001	Rave Master	
2002	WXIII: Patlabor the Movie 3	
2003	Gunparade March	
2004	Ghost in The Shell 2: INNOCENCE	Movie
2004	Ultraman Nexus	
2004	Windy Tales	
2005	Starship Operators	
2005	MAKOTO	
2006	Fate/Stay Night	TV series
2006	Tachiguishi-Retsuden	Music and Actor
2006	Higurashi no Naku Koro ni	
2007	Seirei no Moribito	
2007	Higurashi no Naku Koro ni Kai	
2007	Mobile Suit Gundam 00	
2008	The Sky Crawlers	
2009	Eden of the East	
2010	Fate/stay night: Unlimited Blade Works	
2010	Mobile Suit Gundam 00 the Movie: A Wakening of the Trailblazer	
2011	Towa no Quon	
2011	Busou Chuugakusei Basket Army	
2012	009 Re:Cyborg	
2012	Unofficial Sentai Akibaranger	
2014	Barakamon	
2014	World Trigger	
2014	The Perfect Insider	
2015	Hana Moyu	Taiga drama
2015	Wakaba Girl	
2015	Subete ga F ni Naru	
2016	Mobile Police Patlabor: Reboot	ONA, serve as extra episode of Japan Animator Expo
2016	Joker Game	
2016	Mob Psycho 100	
2016	Servamp	
2016	Touken Ranbu: Hanamaru	
2017	Ultraman Geed	
2017	Kamen Rider Build	
2018	The Ryuo's Work Is Never Done!	
2018	Manpuku	Asadora
2019	Afterlost	
2019	No Guns Life	
2020	Higurashi: When They Cry – Gou	
2021	Vlad Love	ONA
2021	Higurashi: When They Cry – Sotsu	
2023	The Fire Hunter	
2023	My Home Hero	
2023	Ōoku: The Inner Chambers	ONA
2024	Code Geass: Rozé of the Recapture	ONA
2025	Umamusume: Cinderella Gray	
2026	Patlabor EZY	OVA

=== Film ===
Year	Title
1987	The Red Spectacles
1991	Mikadroid: Robokill Beneath Disco Club Layla
1991	StrayDog: Kerberos Panzer Cops
1992	Talking Head
1998	Ring
1999	Ring 2
2000	Sadistic and Masochistic
2000	Sleeping Bride
2000	Chaos
2001	Avalon
2001	Unloved
2001	The Princess Blade
2002	Dark Water
2002	Samourais
2002	Bloody Mallory
2004	Kibakichi: Bakko yokaiden
2004	Kibakichi: Bakko yokaiden 2
2005	Open Your Mind
2005	Antarctic Journal
2005	Seven Swords
2005	Rinne
2005	Kidan (奇谈)
2006	Death Note
2006	Running Wild
2006	Dragon Tiger Gate
2006	Trapped Ashes
2006	Death Note 2: The Last Name
2006	A Battle of Wits
2007	Kaidan
2008	Ip Man
2009	Assault Girls
2009	The Hovering Blade
2010	Ip Man 2
2010	The Incite Mill
2010	Ultraman Zero: The Revenge of Belial
2011	GANTZ
2011	GANTZ: Perfect Answer
2011	Tormented
2013	Young Detective Dee: Rise of the Sea Dragon
2014	Garm Wars: The Last Druid
2015	Ip Man 3
2015	Gamera
2016	Re:Born
2017	Biohazard Vendetta
2018	Detective Dee: The Four Heavenly Kings
2018	Maquia: When the Promised Flower Blooms
2019	Ip Man 4
2019	Blood Friends (血ぃともだち)
2020	The Yin-Yang Master: Dream of Eternity
2021	Limbo
2024	Twilight of the Warriors: Walled In

=== Video games ===
Year	Title	Platform
1990	Sansara Naga	Famicom
1990	Bloody Warriors: Shangō no Gyakushū	Famicom
1992	Sorcerian	PC Engine
1994	Team Innocent: The Point of No Return	PC-FX
1994	Sansara Naga 2	Super Famicom
1998	Deep Fear	Sega Saturn
2003	Nobunaga's Ambition Online (Chapter of Hiryu)	PlayStation 2
2007	FolksSoul	PlayStation 3
2007–2010	Sangokushi Online	Windows

=== Documentary ===
Year	Title
2009	Apocalypse: The Second World War

=== Ice shows ===
Year	Title
2019	Hyoen – Like the moonlight
2024	Hyoen – Miracle of the Cross

=== Others ===
Year	Title
2015	GAMERA

== Awards and honors ==
- Asteroid 117582 Kenjikawai, discovered by Roy A. Tucker in 2005, was named in his honor. The official naming citation was published by the Minor Planet Center on January 9, 2020 (M.P.C. 120069).

== See also ==
- Anime
- Cinema of Japan
- Hideo Nakata
- Japanese horror
- Mamoru Oshii
