= Pikiinya! =

1997 video game

- Developer: Crea-Tech
- Publisher: ASCII
- Designers: Hiroshi Miyaoka; Tomoki Tauchi
- Composers: Satoshi Kadokura; Katsuhiro Hatano; Cube; Tomohiro Endo; Hiroshi Iizuka; Hiroo Tengenji
- Platform: Super Famicom
- Release: JP: January 31, 1997
- Genre: Puzzle
- Modes: Single-player, multiplayer

Pikiinya! (ピキーニャ！; "Pikīnya!" or "Piki-nya!") is a Japan-exclusive action-puzzle video game developed by Crea-Tech and published by ASCII, which was released in 1997 for the Super Famicom.

== Summary ==
Pikiinya! takes the Tetris-esque formula of blocks falling from the sky and adds gyrating tropical-type penguins. They excite easily, and sleep when they are alone and/or bored. These penguins just want to live in peace, and throughout the story mode in the game they must constantly fight against people that want to capture them including poachers, witch doctors, and mad scientists.

The characters were designed by Tamakichi Sakura (the artist of Super Mario Adventures). The game designers were Hiroshi Miyaoka and Tomoki Tauchi. The voices are from Maki Yagita.

== Sequel/legacy ==
In 1998, Pikiinya! EX (ピキーニャ！EX) was released for the PlayStation. The game was released with added cutscenes.

There was also a mobile version of the game released on what looked like a virtual pet key chain thing, which was supposed to be a promotional item with the game in LCD format, but it didn't do too well. ASCII were planning on making it a franchise but the timing happened to be wrong.

The soundtrack was also released as part of a best-of PS1 compilation album.

== Critical reception ==
The Japanese website Wazap! gave Pikiinya! a total score of 65 out of 100, while Pikiinya! EX scored 48.

== See also ==
- Penguin Wars
- List of PlayStation games
