= Shin Megami Tensei III: Nocturne =

2003 video game

- North American PlayStation 2 cover art, featuring the Demi-fiend
- Developer: Atlus
- Publishers: JP: Atlus; NA: Atlus USA; EU: Ghostlight; WW: Sega (HD Remaster)
- Directors: Katsura Hashino; Kazuyuki Yamai (Maniax)
- Producer: Kouji Okada
- Designer: Eiji Ishida
- Artist: Kazuma Kaneko
- Writers: Shogo Isogai; Nakaji Kimura; Shigeo Komori; Kazuyuki Yamai
- Composers: Shoji Meguro; Toshiko Tasaki; Kenichi Tsuchiya
- Series: Megami Tensei
- Engine: Unity (HD Remaster)
- Platforms: PlayStation 2; HD Remaster; Nintendo Switch; PlayStation 4; Windows
- Release: February 20, 2003: PlayStation 2; JP: February 20, 2003 Maniax; JP: January 29, 2004; NA: October 12, 2004; EU: July 1, 2005 Maniax Chronicle; JP: October 23, 2008 HD Remaster PlayStation 4, Switch; JP: October 29, 2020; WW: May 25, 2021 Windows; WW: May 25, 2021
- Genre: Role-playing
- Mode: Single-player

Shin Megami Tensei III: Nocturne (Note: Japanese: Shin Megami Tensei Surī Nokutān (真・女神転生III-NOCTURNE; lit. True Goddess Reincarnation III: Nocturne)) is a role-playing video game developed by Atlus for the PlayStation 2. It was published by Atlus in Japan and North America, and by Ghostlight in Europe. It is the third mainline entry in the Shin Megami Tensei series, the central series in the Megami Tensei franchise. Multiple versions of the game have been published: the original version was published in Japan by Atlus in 2003, while a director's cut was released in 2004 in Japan. The director's cut was localized and released in North America in 2004 as Shin Megami Tensei: Nocturne and in PAL regions in 2005 as Shin Megami Tensei: Lucifer's Call. A high-definition remaster was released for the Nintendo Switch and PlayStation 4 in Japan in 2020, and was internationally released in 2021 on those consoles and Windows.

Nocturne follows a high school student in post-apocalyptic Tokyo, who is transformed into the demonic Demi-fiend after the world undergoes Conception, an apocalyptic event triggered by a sinister cult to enable the world's rebirth in a new form. With Tokyo transformed into a Vortex World filled with demons, the Demi-fiend becomes instrumental in the affairs of surviving humans and their Reasons - philosophies they plan to use to shape the world when it is reborn - and Lucifer, the lord of demons. The gameplay uses a turn-based battle system based on exploiting weaknesses, and a Demon recruitment system allowing the player to recruit demons found in the Vortex World to fight alongside them.

The game was conceived after the completion of Shin Megami Tensei II and Shin Megami Tensei If..., but was delayed as the team worked out what they wanted for the game, including making it appeal to a wider audience than previous Megami Tensei games. Unlike the science fiction setting of Shin Megami Tensei II, Nocturne returned to a contemporary setting similar to the original game. The setting and characters were inspired by multiple elements, including Gnosticism, Mahayana Buddhism, and modern popular culture. Among the things the team changed from previous entries were the camera perspective, which was switched from a first- to a third-person camera perspective, and using a cel-shaded art style to distinguish it from other games of the time. The music, primarily composed by Shoji Meguro, paid homage to earlier Megami Tensei games while drawing on music styles from the 1980s.

The original edition of Nocturne released in Japan to strong sales and a positive critical reception, and the limited director's cut proved so popular that Atlus made a second print in response to fan demand. It also inspired a drama CD and a light novel in Japan. The director's cut was the version chosen for localization, making Nocturne the first mainline Shin Megami Tensei game to be released in the west. The game was well received by video game publications, who praised its gameplay and atmosphere, while its challenging difficulty was often a subject of criticism and occasional praise. It was also announced to have been a commercial success in the West.

== Gameplay ==
Shin Megami Tensei III: Nocturne is initially set moments before a post-apocalyptic conception of modern-day Tokyo: aside from the opening segment, post-apocalyptic Tokyo, also known as the Vortex World, is the main setting. From the outset, the player can select two difficulty settings: Normal and Hard. The player controls a silent protagonist who is given a name during the opening. The player navigates the Vortex World through both a 2D world map, and to-scale 3D environments used in dungeons. While navigating the world map, the Protagonist's party and other non-player characters (NPCs), interactive objects and landmarks are represented by symbols: these objects and NPCs include containers holding items, spirits that will heal the party, and a globe in the bottom left-hand corner of the screen showing the party's approximate location on the world map. During dungeon navigation, the Protagonist navigates grid-based, multi-leveled areas. Different areas are accessed via doors, and as the Protagonist progresses the area is automatically mapped. While exploring dungeons, the in-game camera can be freely rotated, and a "Look" action allows the player to see environments in first-person. The game world can be navigated either on foot or by using a fast travel system unlocked at a certain point in the game.

Multiple important locations are located within the world: these include Terminals that give access to a fast travel system; the Junk Shop, which acts as a vendor for buying and selling items; Rag's Jewelry, where gems collected during gameplay can be traded for rare items and unique demons; and the Fountain of Life, where the Protagonist and other party members can receive treatment for ailments, heal them of damage, or revive characters knocked out in battle. An optional location separate from the Vortex World is the Amala Labyrinth, accessed after the Protagonist has reached a certain point in the story. The Labyrinth is a dungeon divided into multiple floors or Kalpa, each housing both demon enemies and brokers who sell demons to the Protagonist. Each Kalpa is connected by a Warp Zone, in which the Protagonist can collect currency and items while avoiding or destroying obstacles. Proceeding through the levels of the Labyrinth requires the protagonist to find and fight Fiends carrying Candelabra, which unlock barriers. The Candelabra also act as a means of locating and either engaging or avoiding Fiends.

=== Battle system ===
A battle wherein the player is using the main character (now under control) and a party of three demons. The blue icons seen in the top right indicate how many turns the player has left.

During navigation, an indicator in the bottom right-hand corner of the screen indicates the presence of enemies and the likelihood of a battle being triggered. An indicator in the top left-hand corner also shows the current "phase" of Kagutsuchi, a moon-like object hovering in the sky of the Vortex World which shifts its phase as the Protagonist explores. Standard battles are initiated through random encounters, which trigger a transition into a dedicated battle arena. The player party is composed of the Protagonist and up to three demons: only eight demons can be carried by the Protagonist at the game's opening, but more can be added as the game progresses. At the end of battles, the party gains experience points and Macca, the in-game currency. Party members will level up when enough experience points have been gathered. Upon leveling up, the statistics of allied demons are randomly raised, while the Protagonist's stats can be customized by the player. The Protagonist's abilities and resistances are also influenced by equipping one of 24 different Magatama found in-game. The Protagonist can learn new skills from equipped Magatama when he levels up, and is also granted passive buffs and debuffs which take effect in battle. Magatama will sometimes act violently within the Protagonist, creating different effects depending on the Magatama equipped.

Battles are governed by a turn-based mechanic called the "Press Turn" system. Each character participating in combat, friend and foe alike, provides one or more Press Turns represented in the upper right-hand corner of the screen as icons. The rule behind this system is that any action (attacking, using skills, items, contacting demons, summoning commands) will normally cost one full turn. If a combatant scores a critical hit, exploits their opponent's weakness, or passes on making an action, they gain an additional turn marked by a pulsating icon. These added turns allow characters to perform all actions available within normal turns. If the player chooses to pass on an additional turn, that turn is lost. If an attack fails through missing or blocking, then multiple turns are lost: how many depends on how many combatants avoided or blocked it. If an attack heals an enemy, all remaining turns are lost. An auto-attack option is available, where party members can use standard physical attacks or repeat their actions from the previous turn. Characters can escape from normal battles, with failure forfeiting a player turn. If the main character loses all health, the game ends, regardless of the status of his demons.

=== Demon negotiation and fusion ===
A key element related to battles is demon negotiation, the process by which new demons are invited to join the Protagonist and can fight alongside them. The majority of demons can be talked to in battle by the Protagonist, and some allied demons. After selecting the option to talk, the player selects a demon, which initiates a negotiation. For those demons who can talk, the responses vary by both situation and a demon's temperament: some demons can be bribed with Macca and items, some will ask questions related to subjects like philosophy, while others can be influenced by the Protagonist's skills of flattery or eloquence. A negotiation can fail if the wrong responses are chosen, if the Protagonist's demon roster is full, or if another enemy demon interrupts. When in the party, demons can be summoned or dismissed from battle. The level of assigned Magatama can also affect how negotiation goes.

In addition to recruiting in battle, new demons are acquired through fusion at a location called the Cathedral of Shadows. Normally only two demons can be fused at once, but under certain conditions, more demons can be fused together, in a method known as "sacrificial fusion", player can sacrifice a higher level demon during fusion to have the resultant demon inherit skills from all the constituent demons and receive 1.5x times the XP of the sacrificed demon. Fusions can produce a variety of results based on various circumstances, such as the current phase of Kagutsuchi and the addition of items called Deathstones. When in the Cathedral of Shadows, the Protagonist can select two demons, viewing a preview of the resultant demon, then initiate a fusion. The resultant demon will both possess its own skills and inherit skills from both parents: skill inheritance is randomized. Higher-level demons produce more powerful fusions. Demons gained through negotiation or fusion are automatically stored in the Demon Compendium, a record kept within the Cathedral of Shadows. The Protagonist can also pay to summon a demon from the Compendium, returning it to his ranks.

== Synopsis ==
=== Setting and characters ===
The setting and events of Nocturne take place in a separate continuity to the rest of the Megami Tensei series. Nocturne is set in modern-day Tokyo before and after an event called the Conception, in which the normal world is destroyed through the actions of a cult to prevent the world's stagnation and ultimate demise, as dictated by the Great Will governing existence. Tokyo is transformed into a wasteland on the inside of a sphere inhabited by the spirits of humans who died in the Conception; demons who wage war with each other; and Reasons, strongly convicted philosophies formed from the gathering of Magatsuhi energy by people and supported by a deity or demon sponsor. Those who possess Reasons seek to remake the world in their image by presenting themselves to Kagutsuchi, a semi-sentient manifestation of the Great Will's power which exists to perpetuate the destruction and rebirth of worlds through Conception, and proving their worth. (Note: Lady in Black: Kagutsuchi... It is the light whose sole purpose is to empower the one who will oversee creation. Creation is the act of bringing a new world into existence, made possible by the annihilation of the old world. Kagutsuchi will allow a life form of its choosing to determine the course of the new world. There must be those in Tokyo who yearn to be chosen by Kagutsuchi, in order to realize their vision. The shape of the world to come depends on who is chosen...and what their Reason is. In the vast Amala Universe, this Vortex World is not the only place where creation occurs. Kagutsuchi rises, matures, and falls in countless other places. There are millions--no, billions of worlds that you are unaware of, and they all experience the cycle of death and rebirth. That is the way of Amala, as determined by the Great Will.) Another realm mentioned in the story is the Shadow Vortex, a limbo where dead worlds and the beings who created them linger.

The nameless main Protagonist is the player character: generally dubbed the Demi-fiend, he is an "everyday man" who represents the player. Several other characters survive the opening events of the game alongside him, many of them representing the various routes the player can choose to take. They are Yuko Takao, his teacher and a key figure in future events; his classmates Chiaki Hayasaka and Isamu Nitta; and Hikawa, leader of the Cult of Gaea and later the Assembly of Nihilo. Other characters include Jyoji Hijiri, a journalist the Protagonist meets with prior to the Conception; and Futomimi, a powerful Manikin seeking to create his own Reason. All the game's events are watched over by Lucifer, ruler of the demons and the Great Will's sworn enemy, who takes on multiple forms during the story. Two guest characters from other games appear in later versions of the game: demon hunter Dante, protagonist of the Devil May Cry franchise, and Raidou Kuzunoha, a lead character from the Devil Summoner subseries. The former was included in the Maniax rerelease while the latter replaced Dante in the Chronicle Edition.

=== Plot ===
The game begins with the Protagonist arriving in Tokyo to meet up with Chiaki and Isamu to visit Takao in a hospital. While in the city, the player learns of a confrontation between two cults which resulted in several deaths, and learns details of it from Hijiri when he meets them in the park where the event took place. Finding the hospital deserted apart from Chiaki and Isamu, the Protagonist searches it, is briefly accosted by Lucifer in his child form, and is almost killed by Hikawa. Saved from Hikawa by Takao, the Protagonist is taken by her to the hospital roof and witnesses the Conception, with Takao saying the resulting Vortex World will remain until the next creation is triggered. (Note: Yuko: You heard what Hikawa said, right? The world is about to be engulfed by chaos. It's called the [Conception]... The rebirth of the world, an event which no human has ever witnessed. Everyone outside of this hospital will perish. I doubt anyone would approve of such a terrible thing... But, even if we let this old world continue to exist, it would eventually lose all of its power. The world must first die, for it to be born again... And I alone will carry the burden of its sin...No, I don't have any regrets.) In the immediate aftermath, Lucifer contacts the Protagonist again and infuses him with a Magatama, wishing to see whether he can lead his armies against the Great Will. This turns the Protagonist into the Demi-fiend, a being with the powers of a demon and the heart of a human. (Note: Woman in Black: It is my honor to tell you that my little master has shown an interest in you. Poor human, he wants to give you a special gift. It is vital that you receive this gift...Please do not move.It will only hurt for an instant ...This will make you a demon... Magatama, the essence of demonic power... You have now joined the ranks of demons.) After escaping from the hospital, the Demi-fiend begins exploring the Vortex World with help from Hijiri. (Note: Hijiri: Hey, wanna work together? If we're gonna have any hope of getting out of this mess, then we've got to find Hikawa. I heard there's a group in Ginza that's vying for control of shaping this infant world, and its leader is a human. That leader's gotta be Hikawa.) He learns of two cults who seek to remake the world in their image: Hikawa's Assembly of Nihilo, and a separate organization called the Mantra Army. Hikawa manages to destroy the Mantra Army, with Takao acting as his assistant. (Note: Hikawa: Mantra believes they've destroyed this base, but as you can see, the core is fully functional... Nothing more needs to be done. The targeted amount of Magatsuhi will be reached shortly. However, they deserve to be punished. We'll use them as an example...of what happens to those who oppose the Assembly of Nihilo. This is a good opportunity. Witness what is about to take place. Using the Magatsuhi stored here, I will call on my new strength. The time has come... Activate the Nightmare System.) (Note: Hikawa: ...Oh, I forgot to mention. Yuko Takao plays a key role in this system. She's been a great help to me. Her abilities as the Maiden have been invaluable...)

The Demi-fiend goes in search for his friends and faces these groups. Both Chiaki and Isamu are distraught by the Vortex World and decide to move on their own rather than relying on their friend's power, while Takao realizes she is being used by Hikawa and decides to go on her own quest to create her desired world. (Note: Yuko: I just do Hikawa's bidding. 'I would like you to become the pillar of the new world.' That's what he told me. In the end, I was nothing but a tool for collecting Magatsuhi... It's true that the Conception did take place, and I assisted in making it happen. The world is about to be reborn, but as it stands now, the new world is going to be a far cry from what I had hoped for. I dreamed of an ideal world where people were grateful to be alive...) To do this, she allies with Aradia, a former deity from the Shadow Vortex. After this point, all the supporting characters are seeking to ally with a powerful entity from the Shadow Vortex and create their own Reason, a powerful inner philosophy of life that can be used to mold the new world. To do this, a large quantity of an energy called Magatsuhi is needed, which each character begins hoarding. (Note: Hijiri: To create a new world, you must have a strong idea of what kind of world you want to create. This idea is commonly referred to as a Reason. Now, to acquire a Reason, you must receive divine protection from a god, and this is where the Magatsuhi comes into play. You need a large quantity of Magatsuhi in order to summon a god. That's why Hikawa, a human, was collecting Magatsuhi.) Hikawa's Shijima Reason wants a world of stillness and conformity in the service of a peaceful world; Chiaki's Yosuga Reason seeks a world where the strong rule supreme and destroy the weak; and Isamu's Musubi Reason wishes for a world where everyone is an individual who can live without reliance on others. Others also attempt to form a Reason, including Futomimi, who wishes to free the world's Manikins from their servitude, and Takao, who wants a world where people value life and have freedom. Both die before they can realize their wishes, and Takao gives the Demi-fiend an artifact that will enable him to remake the world. (Note: Takao: All possibility has dried up in this world... But, there must be a world out there where freedom prevails. I wasn't strong enough, but... it seems your will is greater. ...Use this and create the world that you want. Hurry... to Amala Temple. This will show you the way to Kagutsuchi...) Hijiri, revealed to be a manikin doomed to be reborn and suffer repeatedly for an unspecified "sin" against the Great Will, also attempts to gather enough Magatsuhi to remake the world, but is thwarted and sacrificed by Isamu to create his own Reason. (Note: Lady in Black: The man I am referring to was known as Hijiri in your previous world. He died, but as fate would have it, he carried on in the Vortex World. Think back to when you first met him, to when the Conception occurred. ...Yes, he did lose his life like all the others. As he was heading to the hospital where you already were, the Conception began and his life ended. Did it not seem odd to you, that he was in the Vortex World unaffected, unchanged? It was all because of the mortal sin which he committed... He was a being toyed with by fate, condemned to carry the burden of atonement forever.) (Note: Isamu: See that? The Magatsuhi he's gathering will give power to my Reason. To be honest with you, [player], I'm not the one who came up with this brilliant idea. He did. Of course, he planned to use the Matatsuhi himself... and it would have been you or me hanging up there!!) Additionally, the Demi-fiend can fulfill a request from Lucifer to collect eight Candelabra from Fiends. (Note: Matador: ...Only one of us will escape this domain alive. The victor shall claim the loser's candelabrum, and return in triumph. You hold a candelabrum...Then, like me, you must be seeking supreme power.)

Choosing to support a Reason will result in a different ending depending on who is chosen, but in each the world is reborn in the image of the chosen Reason after the Demi-fiend fights Kagutsuchi to prove his resolve. Chiaki and Isamu die before the Demi-fiend begins and give him their blessing in spirit form, while Hikawa accompanies the Demi-fiend into their new world. If Takao's wishes are followed, the Demi-fiend fights Kagutsuchi and the world is returned to its pre-Conception state, resurrecting and restoring all the main characters. If the Demi-fiend rejects Takao's wishes, Kagutsuchi curses him for allowing the world to die and departs, leaving the Demi-fiend as the only survivor in a barren world of demons, trapped as it is until another Conception can happen. (Note: Lucifer: A demon born in exchange for the world... There's no other quite like you. Kagutsuchi may have cursed you, but I give you my blessing. Light no longer shines upon you. But, you can do without it, can't you? Darkness is the source of your power now... I'm afraid I have to go now. I won't forget you, though. We'll definitely meet again... You should get going, too. Chaos will reign, as you desired, since no new world was forged. Indeed, it shall be the millennial kingdom of demons...) If the Demi-fiend fulfills Lucifer's request of collecting the Candelabra from the Fiends, Kagutsuchi attacks him and is destroyed, breaking the Great Will's control over the worlds. After this, Lucifer fights the Demi-fiend to test his strength, then declares him to be the ultimate weapon in the upcoming war against the Great Will. (Note: Lucifer: All of you who have lurked in darkness and waited faithfully for this day, hear me... A new demon of darkness has been born...The time has come. Together, let us march onward! To the final battle... where our true enemy awaits! / Great Will: You have created a new demon in your heart's likeness, fallen angel? Then, doom shall set us apart... now and forevermore...)

== Development ==
The concept for a third Shin Megami Tensei title was originally proposed by Kazuma Kaneko and others after the completion of the previous two installments, Shin Megami Tensei II and Shin Megami Tensei If.... There were originally no plans to continue the Shin Megami Tensei series beyond If..., with there instead being plans for an original project. Despite the release of the PlayStation and Sega Saturn consoles, the team took a while to decide what they wanted for the game, the team spent time deciding to create a different kind of game that would appeal to a wider audience than its prequels. Eventually, the team decided that they needed to develop for the PlayStation 2 to realize their vision. Because of this delay, Atlus shifted development focus onto Megami Ibunroku Persona and Shin Megami Tensei: Devil Summoner. During this early concept stage, many of the staff felt lost as to where they could go with the new project. As part of the research, the team created a 3D test demo featuring the demon Cerberus to test the PlayStation 2 hardware. The demo was created before Nocturne's contents had been decided upon, as a test on modelling and animating demons. Nocturne was among the first Megami Tensei titles to use 3D graphics, alongside Shin Megami Tensei: Nine. Development on Nocturne began in 2000, with the creation of the first Alpha builds to determine how the main character would move around environments. To finalized their desired aesthetic look, the team created internal tech demos using 3D models of characters from previous Megami Tensei games. When their vision for the game had been finalized, full development began in 2002, taking approximately one year.

Along with Kaneko, series co-creator Kouji Okada produced the title. The game was directed by Katsura Hashino, his first time in such a position within the Megami Tensei series. While the option of making a direct sequel to Shin Megami Tensei II was considered, Kaneko wanted to return to the contemporary setting of the original Shin Megami Tensei as opposed to the science fiction aesthetic of its sequel. As it was felt that the game was more than just the third numeric installment, a subtitle was added. Before the final subtitle, "Nocturne" was added, other subtitles were considered. An early subtitle was Vortex. The game uses a third-person camera perspective rather than the first-person dungeon crawling of earlier installments. One of the reasons for this change was that the developers wanted to focus on the protagonist, who would stand out for being a half-demon. Another factor was many reports of people suffering from a condition similar to car sickness called "3D sickness" with first person shooters in Japan: the developers wanted players to have something to focus their eyes on. Despite setting the game in contemporary Tokyo, the team chose a cel-shaded art style as they wanted their game to stand out and enable Kaneko to bring the game as close as possible to his original vision.

The desired feel of the game design was defined by Okada as "simple yet profound". One of the earlier ideas was to make the Vortex World a vast battlefield where players could see distant scenery on the horizon and in the sky, but performance issues meant the idea had to be scrapped. The Press Turn system was created so battles would feel less sedated than the pure turn-based battle systems of earlier titles. The initial concept was a kind of meter where players and characters were given turns which were extended if a character's weak spot was exposed. To ensure this did not lead to repetition in battle, a second meter was implemented so enemy characters would become acclimated with an attack that was used too often. As the displays needed for this cluttered up the screen, the concept was revised so a single gauge represented a party's number of turns, with a side's turn being extended if a weakness was exposed or a critical strike happened. As they settled on the rule of one action to one unit, the gauge was replaced with the current icon display. One of the requests given by Okada was to simplify the gameplay, especially aspects such as demon fusion, which had become fairly convoluted by Shin Megami Tensei II. The equipment system was also redesigned to better fit the setting, and adjusting aspects of demon interaction.

=== Design ===
Shinjuku, a major area within the city of Tokyo and one of the settings of Nocturne

Nocturne expanded on the general Megami Tensei theme of people lacking excitement in their everyday lives, with Nocturne focusing on the extraordinary events people could not experience in real life. The team wanted Nocturne to feel like a "journey into hell" comparable with Dante Alighieri's Divine Comedy and Francis Ford Coppola's 1979 film Apocalypse Now. Kaneko was mainly responsible for creating the inverted bubble structure of the Vortex World. This design choice was primarily inspired by similar ideas in Gnostic traditions, early science fiction, and the Heart Sutra, an important scripture within Mahayana Buddhism. In contrast to previous games which offered three routes for the cast, Chaos was the only affiliation of the characters. This was due to the fact the staff saw the Chaos route offered more to the player, and that it would be boring to have the same designs as previous games. It also gave the team more development freedom. Another reason was that Shin Megami Tensei II had already explored a world governed by Law, so it seemed natural to swing the other way and depict a world ruled by Chaos. In addition, Kaneko stated that Nocturne was part of a movement to create a single unified mythos for the Megami Tensei series. One of the main aspects of incorporating this theme were discussions about the nature of chaos.

Okada's main wish for the title was it to "go back to the Creation". The initial concept of a triggered rebirth to prevent stagnation was suggested by Kaneko upon seeing a change in fashion: after a period of flashy or gaudy clothing tastes, people had begun wearing plain suits. Using this, he thought up the concept of this signalling a stagnation in the world's life energy, necessitating a drastic change. The game's main setting of Shinjuku in Tokyo in ruins came from Okada, who visualized areas like Kabukichō and Shibuya as good settings. The Reasons were inspired by the team's want to show several styles for living. The Manikins were created as a representation of the Vortex World and the war between the Reasons, acting as a mass pressuring for the birth of a new world. They mirrored the mechanisms of a country with a high population, and were based on the idea of people being overwhelmed by numbers and acting in accordance with a common norm. The scenario was written by Shogo Isogai, whose main task was to take Okada and Kaneko's vision and turn it into a story that would fit into the framework of a traditional Megami Tensei game. The overall concept was so grand that it seemed at times too ambitious, and involved the layering of multiple interactions between different factions and ideals, alongside incorporating the common Megami Tensei narrative features such as multiple endings and the modern-day setting. The story had multiple possible routes and endings to emphasize the importance of the player's decisions. One of the early concepts that needed to be cut was giant demons battling each other in Tokyo.

In keeping with previous entries, the story focused on a single protagonist rather than a group as in other role-playing games of the time to promote full player immersion. The main protagonist was the first character to be created, being featured in the first Alpha build. So as to include a feeling of "digitality" in the game, the main character was designed as something akin to a human computer. This approach was inspired by the special make-up used in David Cronenberg's 1983 horror film Videodrome. While the protagonist was originally designed with keyboards growing from inside him, Kaneko felt uncomfortable with that and instead redesigned him with full-body tattoos. The tattoos were intended to convey the character's demon powers, act as an obvious stigma in place of wings or horns, and be a reference to real-world shamans who commonly made themselves stand out using tattoos. Kaneko's inspiration for the main character's design was the American rock band Red Hot Chili Peppers: according to Kaneko, he "imagined [the main character] running around the desert naked". The main character was initially going to use one of the series' recurring arm-mounted COMP computers, but as he had already become a demon hybrid, it did not make sense to include it. As he was the character controlled by the player, more focus was given to embodying and reflecting his world view than to developing a personality. In keeping with the game's theme of energy remaking reality, Kaneko dressed his character in comfortable shorts to balance against his tattoos. The spike growing from the main character's neck, the Magatama fused with him at the beginning of the game, was inspired by the theory that a person's aura appears as a shark fin sticking out of the back of their neck when viewed from the side.

The number of supporting characters was kept low to emphasize their individuality, and their personalities were left ambiguous to reinforce the desire for player immersion. The heroine Yuko Takao was intended to be a different type of character to previous main heroines, being a non-playable character from the beginning of story development. She was the only major non-playable character not to have her own Reason. The character of Lucifer designed was not a standard villain, but rather as a gentlemanly observer who sets tests for the player. To reflect his omnipotent status as God's opposite, he is portrayed in a number of forms, including a child and an old man. Alongside this, the staff wanted to portray demons not only as enemies but as characters the player could relate to and grow attached to when inviting them to their party. One of the key elements for demon designs recycled from earlier games was bringing them into the game and making them as true as possible to the original design while fitting into the game's art style.

=== Music ===
Shin Megami Tensei III: Nocturne Original Soundtrack

Soundtrack album by Shoji Meguro, Kenichi Tsuchiya, Toshiko Tasaki and Tsukasa Masuko
- Released: March 5, 2003
- Recorded: Sony Music Studio Tokyo
- Genre: Video game soundtrack
- Length: Disc 1: 1:01:02; Disc 2: 54:14; Total: 1:55:16
- Label: SME Visual Works

The music for Nocturne was composed by Shoji Meguro, with additional work by Kenichi Tsuchiya and Toshiko Tasaki. Mixing was done by Meguro, Tsuchiya, and Tasaki. The soundtrack included tunes from previous Shin Megami Tensei titles composed by Tsukasa Masuko. While composing the music, Meguro attempted to express his feelings when he saw the world while remaining true to the styles established by the original Megami Tensei games. Taking inspiration from the game's dungeon-battle transitions, and the cut-scenes' combination of current graphics with classic use of subtitles for storytelling, Meguro created modulating tunes which included elements from 1980s music. Meguro also introduced orchestral elements which were absent from previous Megami Tensei scores, using it to emphasize the gameplay's constant shifts between movement and stillness. Meguro generally worked solo on the original version, but for the director's cut, he had help composing new tracks.

The majority of tracks from the game were released in an album, Shin Megami Tensei III: Nocturne Original Soundtrack, on March 5, 2003. The album, published by SME Visual Works under the catalog number SVWC-7173~4, contained 49 tracks and was 1:55:16. A second album containing the tracks composed for the director's cut, Shin Megami Tensei III: Nocturne Original Soundtrack extra version, was released on October 26, 2005. Again published by SME Visual Works under the catalog number SVWC-7308, it contained 21 tracks and was 39:04. In North America, selected tracks from the game were released on a promotional CD exclusive to the game's Limited Edition.

== Versions and merchandise ==
The game was first hinted by an Atlus spokesperson in November 1999, who stated that Atlus was planning an entry in the Megami Tensei franchise for the PS2. The game was eventually announced in September 2002 by the gaming magazine Famitsu, where it was clarified it was a sequel to previous Shin Megami Tensei games rather than an entry in the spin-off Persona series. As part of promotion, a TV commercial featuring live-action segments was created. Atlus had high hopes for Nocturne's success, preparing estimated shipments totaling 500,000 units. The game launched on February 20, 2003. It came in a standard edition, and a limited special edition containing the game's soundtrack and an incense burner modeled after an in-game story component. In addition, a version exclusive to Japanese media retail shop Tsutaya with a unique cover was released. It was later re-released as part of Sony's budget series release on August 5, 2004.

The European cover art prominently advertised the inclusion of Dante in the revised game. The "Featuring Dante from the Devil May Cry series" sticker was the subject of internet memes.

An expanded director's cut of the game, titled Shin Megami Tensei III: Nocturne Maniax, (Note: 真・女神転生III-NOCTURNE マニアクス, Shin Megami Tensei Surī Nokutān - Maniakusu) was released approximately one year after the original version on January 29, 2004 as a limited edition. It was later given a second print run in February that year due to fan demand. The original release in Japan had to have some planned features cut out, so the staff created Maniax, which included both the cut content and additional features. Among the additional features is an optional dungeon that leads to a sixth ending. The lead character of Capcom's hack and slash series Devil May Cry, Dante, appears as a guest character. His inclusion in the game was suggested by a member of the Atlus staff who was a fan of the Devil May Cry series. This idea was approved due to how Dante's job as a demon hunter would fit the setting of Nocturne and thus Atlus created a movie where Dante confronted the game's hero. Capcom was satisfied with this video and allowed Atlus to use the character. A second version of Maniax, Shin Megami Tensei III: Nocturne Maniax Chronicle Edition, (Note: 真・女神転生III-NOCTURNE マニアクス クロニクル・エディション, Shin Megami Tensei Surī Nokutān - Maniakusu Kuronikuru Edishon) was released on October 23, 2008 as part of a Japanese limited edition of Devil Summoner 2: Raidou Kuzunoha vs. King Abaddon: in this version, Dante is replaced by Raidou Kuzunoha, the protagonist of the third and fourth Devil Summoner title.

To commemorate the release of Maniax, a PlayStation 2 memory card decorated with the main protagonist's tattoos was released. A novelization of the game written by Boogey Toumon, Shin Megami Tensei III: Nocturne Chaos, (Note: 真・女神転生III: NOCTURNE 混沌, Shin Megami Tensei Surī Nokutān Konton) was released on August 20, 2003 by Enterbrain. A CD Drama based on the game was released on April 23, 2003 by King Records. A comic anthology adaptation was released by Enterbrain in June 2004.

=== Localization ===
The localization of Nocturne was handled by Atlus USA, the North American branch of Atlus. The original Maniax is the version that was translated and released overseas, as the main director Kazuyuki Yamai believed the enhanced difficulty and the other new features would appeal to the western audience. In addition, the team were encouraged to release it by the success of mature titles in the west such as Grand Theft Auto, and the Maniax edition would give western players the most complete version of the game. The localization was announced in February 2004. This made Nocturne the first main Shin Megami Tensei title to be released outside Japan. It was speculated that this was the reason the numeral III was dropped from the title. Rather than altering the script, Atlus translated it all faithfully from the original Japanese, preserving the original experience as far as possible. For their work on the game's translation, the localization team were given access to source game files and Japanese strategy guide, facilitating them avoiding nuances mistakes such as Kaneko's often highly androgynous designs gender. According to a later interview, it was said that Atlus had high confidence in the title's overseas release. The later popularity and recognition of the game would result in Atlus attaching the "Shin Megami Tensei" moniker to later Western releases of Megami Tensei titles to aid in identification and marketing.

For its release in North America, it was given an "M for Mature" rating by the Entertainment Software Rating Board. In response to this, Atlus' western branch issued a statement saying that they were ensuring that the localized version of the game was true to the Japanese version, including its mature themes and content, as toning anything down "would [have been] a disservice to the gaming public".

Atlus USA licensed the Nocturne name in preparation of its release, a title trademarked by the game developer Terminal Reality for the game series Nocturne. Ghostlight did not follow suit, prompting the game’s European release subtitle of Lucifer's Call instead.

To promote the game, Atlus USA created a sweepstakes that ran between May and September 2004: the winner received a laptop decorated with the main protagonist's tattoo design, along with a free copy of the game. Due to backlogs at Sony Disc Manufacturing, Atlus delayed the release of the game by over three weeks to October 12. In compensation, DoubleJump Books offered free priority shipping worldwide for their Nocturne guidebook. The publishing rights in Europe were picked up by Midas Interactive, who published the game through their then-newly formed subsidiary Ghostlight under the title Shin Megami Tensei: Lucifer's Call. It released on July 1, 2005. Nocturne was the first Megami Tensei title to be released in Europe. It re-released for the PlayStation Network as a PlayStation 2 Classic in both North America and Europe: it released on May 6, 2014 for North America and May 20, 2015 for Europe.

=== HD Remaster ===
A remastered edition, titled Shin Megami Tensei III: Nocturne HD Remaster, was announced during Nintendo Direct Mini: Partners Showcase on July 20, 2020 alongside the release year for Shin Megami Tensei V. It is based on the Maniax Chronicle Edition release, and includes voice-acted cutscenes, dual audio and additional difficulty settings. Production of the remaster began in 2018 and lasted around two years. The new "Merciful" difficulty setting was included as a concession to modern gaming trends, acknowledging players who would want to easily experience the stories and endings. Alongside these and graphical changes, some dialogue was rewritten. A "Maniax Pack" downloadable content item launched alongside the game, restoring Dante in place of Raidou Kuzunoha. The original television commercial was remade around the production's theme of "respect for the original", with original staff returning to create both a 15 second television version, and a web-exclusive 30 second version.

The remaster was released in Japanese, Traditional Chinese and Korean on October 29, 2020 for the Nintendo Switch and PlayStation 4, with a worldwide release and Windows version on May 25, 2021. For the Asian release published by Sega, the Chronicle content was originally omitted. Due to protests from Chinese consumers, the Chronicle content was eventually offered as DLC for Chinese players. It was free for a two week period before becoming a paid item on January 7 of the following year in China.

== Reception ==
Reception

Aggregate scores
| Aggregator | Score |
|---|---|
| Metacritic | PS2: 82/100; PC: 79/100; PS4: 76/100; NS: 75/100 |
| OpenCritic | 67% recommend |

Review scores
| Publication | Score |
|---|---|
| 1Up.com | A− |
| Eurogamer | 8/10 |
| Famitsu | 9/10, 9/10, 9/10, 9/10 |
| G4 | 5/5 |
| GameSpot | 8.5/10 |
| GameSpy | 3.5/5 |
| IGN | 8.6/10 |
| RPGamer | 5/5 |
| RPGFan | 92% |

Critical reception to the game has been positive. The average score in Metacritic is of 82 out of 100. The Japanese video game magazine Famitsu gave it a score of 36/40, earning the magazine's Platinum award and becoming the highest-ranking review score that week. The reviewers were generally positive about their experience: despite some comments about a lack of polish in environments, there was general praise given to the game's character design, aesthetics, gameplay and story, with multiple reviewers calling it a worthy part of the Megami Tensei series.

It received perfect reviews from both G4TV's Darryl Vassar and RPGamer's Michael Beckett, who praised the balance between cutscenes and gameplay, giving the player several areas to explore and the multiple challenges, as well as the multiple paths the player can take across the story resulting in high replay value. The game has been praised for its challenging AI and combat system, alongside its labyrinths. The modern setting and dark storyline from Nocturne has also been found refreshing for contrasting common RPG storylines. Similarly, Jeremy Dunham from IGN noted its "bizarre" story as one of the reasons to play it due to its post-apocalyptic setting. Beckett also praised the visual style employed by Atlus including Kaneko Kazuma's character designs as well as the design of the Vortex World. The latter point was shared by 1UP.com. On the other hand, the highly challenging battle system has bothered reviewers with Rob Fahey from Eurogamer ultimately finding as a flaw that stopped him from giving the game a near perfect score. GameSpot's Bethany Massimilla and RPGFan's Ryan Mattich shared similar feelings noting that despite these drawbacks the game will feel rewarding to players. Despite also noting the game was quite challenging, Beckett found it significantly easier during its last third with the total play time depending on the players' choices when leveling up and obtaining new skills.

Besides good critical response in reviews, Nocturne received recognition by publications. Jeremy Dunham from IGN listed it as the seventh best game from 2004. G4TV also awarded it best RPG from the same year. In RPGamer's awards from 2004 it was ranked third in the Readers' "Best PlayStation 2" category, and had honorable mentions in the categories for the similar Readers' "Best Storyline" and "Graphics" and "Overall". It received a nomination in GameSpot's 2004 "Best Role-playing Game" award category across all platforms. In IGN's "Best of 2004" awards, it was a runner-up for "Best RPG" and "Best Story" in the PS2 category. It was also nominated at the Spike Video Game Awards in the "Best RPG" category. In 2008, Gamasutra listed Nocturne as one of their "Essential 20" role-playing games, noting how challenging the title could be. In 2023, Time Extension included the game on their "Best JRPGs of All Time" list, also noting the brutal difficulty.

=== Sales ===
During its first week of release in Japan, Nocturne sold 185,000 units which were equal to 75.7% of its shipment, topping sales charts. By the second week, the game had dropped to seventh place in the charts, selling a further 37,328 units. This brought total sales to just over 200,000. By the end of 2003, it had sold 245,520 units becoming Japan's 49th bestselling game of the year. Its sales by the end of Atlus' 2002-2003 fiscal year had reached 270,000, falling short of their planned sales of 350,000. The Maniax edition was also popular, reaching 5th place in Japanese sales charts in its first week, and remaining in the top ten for a second week. In an interview with Kaneko, 1UP.com noted that the game had not met with sales equivalent to its high review scores, although no exact figures were given. In contrast, as part of a press release concerning the game's European release, an Atlus staff member noted that it had met with commercial success in North America along with Japan. Speaking in 2013, a Ghostlight representative that Nocturne had, alongside the Digital Devil Saga duology, "met with great success". Later reprints in 2008 and 2009 caused the game to enter the top five PlayStation 2 games on Amazon.com in North America.

The remastered Nintendo Switch version sold 52,481 physical copies within its first week on sale in Japan, making it the second bestselling retail game of the week in the country. The PlayStation 4 version was the third bestselling retail game in Japan throughout the same week, with 48,830 copies being sold. On April 28, 2021, Atlus announced that the remaster had sold over 250,000 copies in Japan and Asia. By October 2021, the remaster had sold over 500,000 copies.

== Notes and references ==
Primary references

Atlus (October 12, 2004). Shin Megami Tensei: Nocturne (PlayStation 2). Atlus.

Translations

Footnotes
