= Sansara Naga =

1990 video game

- Super Famicom cover art
- Developer(s): Advance Communication Company (FC); Marvelous Interactive, Inc. Production I.G, Inc. (SFC); Groove Box Japan (GBA)
- Publisher(s): Victor Interactive Software
- Composer(s): Kenji Kawai; Osamu Kasai (Famicom/Game Boy Advance); Masaaki Harada, Shinji Nakayama (Famicom); Michiharu Hasuya (Super Famicom)
- Platform(s): Family Computer; Super Famicom; Game Boy Advance
- Release: Family Computer: JP: March 23, 1990; Super Famicom: JP: July 15, 1994; Game Boy Advance: JP: December 14, 2001
- Genre(s): Role-playing game
- Mode(s): Single-player

Sansara Naga (サンサーラ・ナーガ, Sansara Naga) is a series of Japan-exclusive video games. The first title was released in 1990 for the Family Computer, four years later Sansara Naga 2 was released for the Super Famicom, and finally in 2001 Sansara Naga 1x2 was released for the Game Boy Advance.

The characters were designed by Tamakichi Sakura.

Despite the game being Japanese, the title is Sanskrit, meaning "Cycle of the Serpent" (Sanskrit: संसारनाग, romanized: "Samsara Naga").

== Sansara Naga ==
Sansara Naga (Japanese: サンサーラ・ナーガ) is a role-playing video game that was published by Victor Music Entertainment exclusively to Japan for the Family Computer (ファミリーコンピュータ) on March 23, 1990. A fan-translation was released on December 28, 2013, by the hacking and translation group Stardust Crusaders. Sansara Naga is set in the fantasy-filled lands of India during the Vedic age and also mixes elements of Japanese folklore such as the legend of Brāhmaṇ Umibōzu (海坊主||"sea bonze"). Many of the NPCs in game say that Cows are sacred animals and a few will mention the Tower of Ṛta Satya.

The story revolves around a Boy/Girl that steals a treasured Ostrich egg from the village of Orissa and decides to reflect upon one's actions; aspiring to become a Dragoon to restore their lost honor. The protagonist will set out on an adventure saving lives, performing good deeds, and raising a newly hatched dragon. There are bosses and many NPC street vendors will attempt to scam you with defective items or attempt to mug you. While the main protagonist does not level and their base stats are fixed at 40 STR, 40 DEF, the dragon that you raise does level. More unique game mechanics to this game include the ability to feed dead bodies to your dragon to raise its level, enchanted armors, field map events, hidden landmarks, a few side quests, and mini-games.

Sansara Naga's gameplay and gameplay mechanics are similar to those of Dragon Quest I, Pokémon and EarthBound.

The Silver Mountains are also referred to as Heaven.

Worthwhile NPC Encounters:

Al Sinha - A wise old Bhikṣu monk and legendary Dragoon. Large and small statues in the shape of a figure of him are lined up outside of the continent's borders. These tall silver statues can be seen rising out of the black chasm known as the 'Edge of the World'. His name, Al Sinha, means "Lion" in Sanskrit. You cannot progress in the storyline without speaking to Al Sinha. It is assumed that he has a few disciples.

Amrita - A lady Dragoon from Shakunta Village. Her name means "Nectar" in Sanskrit. She has a little brother and her own BGM.

Gratama Chef - Can be found at the four Gratama Huts in the world. You can order Take-Out to fight the Brahman boss and win a Beef Bowl.

Tāla - A female dancer from Ikushu Hot Springs. She also travels to Hoverpool Bar, also known as Hawapuru. Her name translates to "Rhythm" in Sanskrit.

Worthwhile Monster Encounters:

Fire Dragon - A very strong dragon located in the desert. Drops Fire Scale, which can be used to forge the powerful Fire Scale Shield and Fire Scale Armor.

Phurba - A one legged monster found in the mountains. Drops speed boots.

Pterosaur - A winged green dragon located in the desert with high attack speed and show-stopping power. Drops the best Mantle in the game.

Shiva Knight - A strong monster from Heaven with high attack speed. Drops one of the strongest swords in the game.

Batman - Drops Metal Bat.

Marut Knight - Drops Marut Mantle.

== Sansara Naga 1x2 ==
On release, Famitsu magazine scored the game a 30 out of 40.

== Soundtrack ==
The Sansara Naga original soundtrack was composed and arranged by Kenji Kawai, with the participation of Rei Sakuma and many other musicians in its sequel. Sansara Naga 2 was published by Victor Entertainment in 1994.
