= Gaia (game company) =

Japanese video game developer

- Industry: Video games
- Founded: October 31, 2003
- Headquarters: Japan
- Key people: Kouji Okada

Gaia (株式会社ガイア, Kabushikigaisha Gaia) was a video game developer formed by Kouji "Cozy" Okada following his departure from Atlus in 2003. Okada is best known as one of the co-creators of the Megami Tensei franchise, along with its subseries Devil Summoner and Persona. It was closely associated with Sony Computer Entertainment.

== History ==
Monster Kingdom: Jewel Summoner was the first game produced by Gaia. Gaia also assisted Game Republic with Folklore's monster-creation system, and its original title was Monster Kingdom: Unknown Realms. Another Gaia game, Coded Soul: Uketsugareshi Idea, was released in 2008 with numerous gameplay elements in common with both Jewel Summoner and Folklore. The developer's website was inactive in 2010, suggesting it closed and its final project, Cosmic Walker for the Wii, was cancelled despite Nintendo's support in the project.

== Games developed ==
Year	Title	Platform(s)	Publisher(s)	Note(s)
2006	Monster Kingdom: Jewel Summoner	PlayStation Portable	Sony Computer Entertainment (JP), Atlus (NA)	
2007	Folklore	PlayStation 3	Sony Computer Entertainment	Co-developed by Game Republic and Japan Studio
2008	Coded Soul: Uketsugareshi Idea	PlayStation Portable	Sony Computer Entertainment	Co-developed by Japan Studio
2010	Sword & Poker	iOS	Gaia	
2010	Sword & Poker 2	iOS	Gaia	
Cancelled	Cosmic Walker	Wii	Nintendo	
