= Kaidan (2007 film) =

- Film poster
- Directed by: Hideo Nakata
- Written by: Satoko Okudera
- Produced by: Takashige Ichise
- Starring: Onoe Kikunosuke V Hitomi Kuroki
- Cinematography: Junichiro Hayashi
- Music by: Kenji Kawai
- Production companies: Shochiku; Entertainment One
- Distributed by: Shochiku; Lionsgate Films
- Release date: August 4, 2007
- Running time: 120 minutes
- Country: Japan
- Language: Japanese

Kaidan (Japanese: 怪談) is a 2007 Japanese horror film directed by Hideo Nakata. It centers on two young lovers who are haunted by the ghost of a murdered moneylender who seeks revenge, which leaves a lasting effect on the couple.

== Plot ==
In feudal Japan, Toyoshiga (Hitomi Kuroki) and Osono are sisters whose father has been killed by Shinzaemon, a samurai, due to a debt dispute. Upon his death, Toyoshiga and Osono's father vowed revenge for his wrongful murder. His body is dumped in a mysterious lake that's believed to be cursed and haunted by a woman who was wrongfully killed by her husband many years ago. Shortly after, Shinzaemon kills his wife and himself, leaving their baby, Shinkichi, orphaned and in care of his uncle.

Years later, Toyoshiga, now a respected teacher who runs a school for young girls in Edo, falls in love with a young tobacco vendor named Shinkichi (Onoe Kikunosuke V), who lives with his uncle. Shinkichi and Toyoshiga decide to live together as husband and wife, but Shinkichi begins flirting with the school's students, especially Oisa. Miserable and envious, Toyoshiga becomes mean to the students, who leave one by one. Toyoshiga also quarrels with Osono, who doesn't approve of her relationship with Shinkichi, prompting Osono to run away.

Shinkichi admonishes Toyoshiga for driving away her sister and declares he wants to end their relationship. Toyoshiga pleads with him not to leave. During this quarrel, Shinkichi accidentally wounds his wife with her shamisen's bachi against her left brow. They reconcile, but Toyoshiga slowly falls ill from her wound. Later, at a festival, Oisa meets Shinkichi, who is there to buy medicine for Toyoshiga, and they rent a hotel room. There he promises to run away with her. Shinkichi then goes to his uncle's house to find that Toyoshiga is waiting for him. Toyoshiga states that he can leave but asks him to promise to stay by her side when she dies.

Toyoshiga succumbs to her illness and is given a proper burial. Shinkichi discovers a letter, left by Toyoshiga, that warns if he remarries, she will haunt his new wife until the latter dies. He and Oisa elope and flee Edo, but they lose their way in a rainstorm. Toyoshiga's vengeful spirit terrorises the pair until she makes a frightful apparition to her husband. Out of fearful defense, Shinkichi strikes at Toyoshiga with a scythe and to his horror, he realises he's stuck it into Oisa's neck. He passes out on the road.

Shinkichi wakes up in the house of a wealthy man. They discover Oisa's corpse, prompting Shinkichi to run away to Hanyo. There, he encounters Osono. Together they mourn the death of Toyoshiga, and Osono soon finds her former brother-in-law a job. He gives her a small bell as a present. Soon, he's referred as the master of the house. The wealthy man and his wife want Shinkichi to marry their daughter Orui, Oisa's cousin. Shinkichi initially declines. After a blue snake attacks Orui, causing her to get burn herself in a fireplace. Shinkichi notices Orui's burn is in the same place as a scar belonging to Toyoshiga. He hastily agrees to marry Orui.

Shinkichi and Orui soon have a daughter, who's born unusually pale with a scar on her left brow. The child eventually displays strange characteristics, which troubles Shinkichi.

== Cast ==
- Onoe Kikunosuke V
- Hitomi Kuroki
- Mao Inoue
- Kumiko Asō
- Tae Kimura
- Asaka Seto
- Masahiko Tsugawa
- Takaaki Enoki

== Production ==
The title means "ghost story". The screenplay for the film was written by Satoko Okudera, based on the ghost story "Shinkei Kasanegafuchi" by Enchou Sanyutei.

The theme song of the film, titled "Fated", was sung by Ayumi Hamasaki.
