= Monster Kingdom: Jewel Summoner =

2006 video game

- North American cover art
- Developer: Gaia (Note: Additional work by Sony Computer Entertainment Japan.)
- Publishers: JP: Sony Computer Entertainment; NA: Atlus
- Director: Teruyuki Toriyama
- Producer: Kouji Okada
- Writer: Noriyuki Oumi
- Composer: See development
- Platform: PlayStation Portable
- Release: JP: February 23, 2006; NA: February 19, 2007
- Genre: Role-playing
- Modes: Single-player, multiplayer

Monster Kingdom: Jewel Summoner (Note: モンスターキングダム・ジュエルサモナー, Monsutā Kingudamu: Jueru Samonā) is a role-playing video game developed by Gaia and published by Sony Computer Entertainment for the PlayStation Portable. The game was released in February 2006 in Japan and in February 2007 in North America by Atlus.

The game takes place in a world where monsters and human beings once lived in harmony. The monsters were hunted and many of them were eventually imprisoned in devices called "jewels". Once trapped in a jewel, a monster becomes tame and servile to the owner of the jewel, allowing human warriors, called Jewel Summoners, to use them in combat against other monsters. The story of Jewel Summoner revolves around the quest for vengeance of one such warrior, Vice, whose mother died at the hands of a monster.

Jewel Summoner received mixed reviews from the gaming press. Its monster-collection theme and turn-based gameplay was often compared to Nintendo's Pokémon series. The game's audio and voice acting were praised, but its story and gameplay were criticized as uninspired and monotonous.

== Gameplay ==
Jewel Summoner takes place in a third-person perspective with a top-down view. The player character's avatar moves around a static world map and can enter 3D dungeons. Inside dungeons, the player's movement will activate random battles against wild monsters; battles are represented in a split-screen format. Dungeons also contain save points that can be used to restore the health of the party. The player can have a party of up to three characters, and each member has a maximum of three monsters that can be summoned from storage receptacles, called jewels, to fight against enemies. Battles are turn-based and each monster has access to several attacks that it can execute each turn. Monsters do not have individual health bars; their controlling character's health is used instead. Enemy monsters can be recruited by weakening them in battle and then capturing them within a jewel.

A typical battle portraying the split-screen format, several characters, and their monsters.

There are over 100 different types of monster in the game, and each possesses traits in the forms of "elements" that dictate its strengths and weaknesses. The element system is similar to a game of "rock-paper-scissors"; for instance, water-elemental monsters have an advantage over fire-based monsters, and fire-based monsters have an advantage over ice-based ones. A monster can only be captured within a jewel that represents the same element. Monsters earn experience in battle and subsequently level up, learn new abilities, and evolve into different creatures. Jewel Summoners can also influence their monsters' growth by fusing them with specially refined items and pieces of quartz, or by increasing their stats with "Ability Points" earned in battle.

In combat, each Jewel Summoner can bring out one monster at a time. Every turn, each monster (both enemy and ally) can activate one attack or elemental ability. Each monster initially has four slots available for abilities. Monsters can quickly learn abilities of their own element type, but can also pick up abilities from other elements. A fire dragon, for instance, can learn snow-based attacks. Using an ability requires the expenditure of a monster's "Jewel Points", a mana-like energy of which each creature has only a finite amount. When a monster's Jewel Points are depleted, it becomes inaccessible to the character and another monster must be selected to fight. Monsters can return to battle when their Jewel Points have been restored at a save point.

Jewel Summoner has two options for multiplayer, using the PSP's "ad-hoc" local wireless feature. Players can trade monsters with each other or fight 1-on-1 battles. The game also includes a browser mode that players can use to connect to the Internet and download wallpapers and game trailers.

== Plot ==
Long before the events of Jewel Summoner, monsters and humans coexisted peacefully in the game's world. Eventually, a mysterious event called the "Great Disaster" occurred, and many monsters disappeared. Those that didn't were contained within "jewels" that became a source of energy that humans harnessed to provide power for their civilization, called the "Powered Civilization". Occasionally, rogue monsters called Abominations would appear and attack humans indiscriminately. The humans responded by developing a skill known as "Jewel Summoning", which could be used to fight and capture Abominations. Jewel Summoners are generally descended from a clan called the "Enchanters" and receive special training in the use of jewels. Trained Jewel Summoners work for an organization called the Order and collaborate to fight Abominations.

Jewel Summoner's story centers around a young Jewel Summoner named Vice. Vice's mother died at the hands of an Abomination named Shina years before, and Vice has been searching for the monster ever since. Before she died, Vice's mother gave him a jewel containing a monster, Schatten, and he subsequently discovered that he had the ability to summon and control Schatten despite not having been trained at the Jewel Summoner Academy. Vice traveled for some time, hunting and destroying Abominations, before drawing the attention of the Order. He eventually enrolls at the Academy and is joined by several other Summoners. The rest of the game follows Vice's journey with his Order teammates and his quest for revenge.

== Development ==
Jewel Summoner was the first game produced by Gaia, a studio formed by Kouji Okada in 2003 after he departed from Atlus. Okada was one of the co-creators of the Shin Megami Tensei role-playing game series, commonly referred to as "MegaTen" in the West. Okada continued the game mechanic of collecting and raising creatures in Jewel Summoner, altered from MegaTen's concept of "nakama": player-controlled, friendly demons.

"When you work in the Japanese game industry, you notice that the shift is towards only creating games based on established franchises sadly. I felt very strongly about doing an original game and trying something I'd never done before so that's why Gaia was created."

— Kouji Okada

Okada's goal with Jewel Summoner was to create an original game "that goes back to the basics of gaming". At the Akihabara Entertainment Festival in 2005, Okada explained that the Japanese gaming industry was full of game series and he was interested in developing new ideas. Shortly after Gaia was formed, the new studio learned that Sony was interested in finding developers for its upcoming handheld game console, the PlayStation Portable. Gaia developed Jewel Summoner exclusively for the PSP, including visuals tailored to its screen and a creature development system that would utilize the console's internal clock to continually train monsters, even when the unit was not in use.

Jewel Summoner borrowed several aspects from Okada's previous games, including Megami Tensei's concept of elements. Despite the similarities, the art style of Jewel Summoner is more in line with traditional RPGs, instead of MegaTen's darker, more adult theme. An important design component of the game is its "rensei"; the monster training system, which is a staple of Okada's work. The game's soundtrack was created by Shinji Hosoe, Hitoshi Sakimoto, Yasunori Mitsuda, Yoko Shimomura, Kenji Ito, Masaharu Iwata, Tsukasa Masuko, Yasuyuki Suzuki, Ayako Saso, and Takahiro Ogata. The game is fully voiced with over 5 total hours of dialogue, which took Gaia a week to record.

Jewel Summoner was released on February 23, 2006 in Japan and February 19, 2007 in North America. Gamasutra reported that at the time of its North American release, it was listed at #7 on GamerMetrics, an IGN program that monitors fan anticipation of video games by tracking wish list requests, e-mail notifications, and other Internet-based game data.

=== Future ===
Okada has revealed that the game was planned as the first entry in a series of Monster Kingdom games; its title was even created with this in mind. Gaia created a comprehensive timeline for Jewel Summoner to allow additional games to be developed within the same universe. Folklore is a PlayStation 3 game with similarities to Jewel Summoner; developed by Game Republic and released by Sony in 2007. Gaia assisted Game Republic with Folklore's monster-creation system, and its original title was Monster Kingdom: Unknown Realms. Another Gaia game, Coded Soul, was released in 2008 and also has gameplay elements in common with Jewel Summoner.

== Reception ==
Reception

Aggregate scores
Aggregator	Score
GameRankings	62.29%
Metacritic	66/100

Review scores
Publication	Score
1Up.com	C+
Electronic Gaming Monthly	7/10
Game Informer	6/10
GameSpot	6.3/10
GamesRadar+	3/5
GameZone	7.4/10
IGN	7.1/10
X-Play	3/5

Jewel Summoner received mixed reviews. Its gameplay format, especially the premise of monster collecting, elicited frequent comparisons to Pokémon, a long-running Nintendo series of games. The gameplay itself was considered generic and unoriginal. IGN stated "All too often the same battles happen again and again", and Game Informer's reviewer said the battle system "is as boring a turn-based snoozefest as I've seen in years". GameZone called Jewel Summoner "prototypical" and said the game "does not stray too far from the formula." The process of improving monsters was described by GameSpot as too long and needlessly complicated, and IGN declared "for the most part it's not even worth it."

Reception of the game's audio was generally positive, with IGN referring to the music as "top-notch" and GamesRadar commenting "The tunes are varied, catchy, match the settings, and show off the PSP's sound system." Comments about the voice acting were lukewarm, however, especially regarding the amount of dialogue in the game. GameSpot referred to the dialogue as "dull" and IGN said "the script itself is a mess." The game's beginning was described as especially slow.

"...there were times where I just wanted to zip around and gather monsters, but I had to put up with everyone yammering at each other for over 20 minutes. It wouldn't be so annoying if this was on a home console, but on the bus to work, there should be less reading and more monster bashing."

— Thierry Nguyen, 1UP

The game's art style and visuals were praised. X-Play said "The monsters [sic] designs here are creative, detailed takes on all kinds of different well-known fantasy archetypes." GameZone's reviewer said "The monster details are very good, as is the majority of the artwork", and IGN noted that "Each of the characters also gets nice, crisp art for the conversational scenes." Game Informer, however, mocked the character design, stating "...each of the major heroes has some kind of glaring aesthetic blunder to make fun of. From the biggest faux-hawk in history to tan lines that Itagaki would be ashamed to put on one of his characters, there's at least some shallow amusement to be had by mocking these hapless digital rejects."
