= Sword & Poker =

2010 video game

- Developer: Gaia
- Publisher: Konami
- Platform: iOS
- Release: Sword & Poker; January 7, 2010; Sword & Poker 2 May 2, 2010; Swords & Poker Adventures; July 16, 2014
- Genre: Role-playing

Sword & Poker is a role-playing game developed by Gaia and published by Konami for iOS. It was released on January 7, 2010. A sequel entitled Sword & Poker 2 was released on May 2, 2010. A spin-off game was released by Konami on July 16, 2014 entitled Swords & Poker Adventures.

== Critical reception ==
=== Sword & Poker ===
Sword & Poker

Aggregate score
Aggregator	Score
Metacritic	89/100

Review scores
Publication	Score
The A.V. Club	A−
Gamezebo	4.5/5
IGN	9/10
TouchArcade	5/5

Sword & Poker received "generally favorable reviews" just one point shy of "universal acclaim", according to the review aggregation website Metacritic.

=== Sword & Poker 2 ===
Sword & Poker 2

Aggregate score
Aggregator	Score
Metacritic	88/100

Review scores
Publication	Score
The A.V. Club	A−
GamePro	4.5/5
Gamezebo	4.5/5
IGN	8.8/10
Pocket Gamer	4/5
TouchArcade	4.5/5

Sword & Poker 2 received "generally favorable reviews", according to Metacritic.

=== Swords & Poker Adventures ===
Swords & Poker Adventures

Aggregate score
Aggregator	Score
Metacritic	62/100

Review scores
Publication	Score
Gamezebo	4/5
Pocket Gamer	2.5/5
TouchArcade	3/5

Swords & Poker Adventures received "mixed" reviews according to Metacritic.
