= Tamakichi Sakura =

Japanese manga artist

Tamakichi Sakura (桜玉吉, Sakura Tamakichi, born 1961), also known as Charlie Nozawa (チャーリー野沢, Chārī Nozawa), is a manga artist.

He is the artist of Super Mario Adventures.

== Video games ==
=== Character design ===
- Dungeon Land
- Pikiinya!
- Sansara Naga
- Tower Dream
