= Kartia: The Word of Fate =

1998 video game

- North American cover art
- Developer: Atlus
- Publisher: Atlus: EU: Konami
- Director: Kenichi Mishima
- Producer: Kouji Okada
- Designer: Shirō Takashima
- Artist: Yoshitaka Amano
- Writer: Kazunori Sakai
- Composers: Kenichi Tsuchiya; Masaki Kurokawa
- Platform: PlayStation
- Release: JP: March 26, 1998; NA: August 17, 1998; EU: June 1999
- Genre: Tactical role-playing
- Modes: Single-player, multiplayer

Kartia: The Word of Fate (or simply Kartia), known as Legend of Kartia in Europe and Rebus (レブス, Rebusu) in Japan, is a tactical role-playing game developed and published by Atlus for the PlayStation. It is best known for the work of its art designer, Yoshitaka Amano, who had previously worked on the Final Fantasy series. Shigenori Soejima, another artist who would later be known for his work on the Persona series, also contributed to the game as an item graphics artist. The game was re-released on the Japanese PlayStation Network in 2011.

== Gameplay ==
The game is divided into two "volumes", each centering on a different main character and their friends. The first volume tells the story of Toxa Classico and the second volume is about Lacryma Christi. While each volume tells a complete story, the storylines intertwine in one major plot.

Each "chapter" of both volumes revolves around phantoms, beings which can be summoned by certain humans using "Kartia", magical cards which create whatever is written on them, such as Fire or Water. Players must summon and control phantoms to fight for them, as well as managing Kartia supplies, casting magic with Kartia cards, and creating weapons for the human combatants. Kartia cards can be combined to create more powerful spells or phantoms. While phantoms may die during battle, if a human party member dies, the game ends and the chapter must be restarted.

== Plot ==
The story takes place in the world of Rebus, primarily within the areas of Cross Land, Idorus, Nordia, and Pentagram. The game is broken into 36 chapters: 18 in Toxa's scenario and 18 in Lacryma's scenario.

=== Story ===
In the Nordia Encrypter School, Akueldo rebel leaders plan to transport the druid Mona through Cross Land and into Idorus. Mona carries a forbidden original Nothingness Kartia that can destroy all of existence. Using a local band of thieves, Mona is escorted from Cross Land to eastern Idorus lands belonging to Count Shinon. The Count's daughter, Ele, discovers this plot and mounts a rescue with the free knight Toxa and two members of Vigilance, Alana and Duran. They save Mona and capture the Akueldo contact Misty. The remaining thieves attack the estate and Misty joins the party to redeem herself. Meanwhile, at Vigilance headquarters in the city of Kainas, Lacryma is left in command while chief Rimazan is away at Pentagram with her adopted father, Bishop Aile. Lacryma, along with Vigilance members Troy, Posha and Kun arrive at an inn overrun with stray Phantoms. The following morning, Troy is arrested by Encrypter police who suspect him of Kartia theft. One of the guards on duty is questioned using evidence found at the inn and exposed as the Akueldo rebel Zakuro. He is subdued and jailed, but later released by a fellow rebel named Cross. Rimzan returns to Kainas to defend the local Shrines' World Tree from the Akueldo agent Karis. Aile is forced to reveal to the Shrine council that Lacryma is the blood daughter of the hero Kainas, whom the city is named after. Many on the council want to make her an Inquirer - a Shrine Warrior that is unrestricted by the law.

Misty encounters Zakuro, and unaware of her desertion, he reveals the plans to attack Vigilance. Duran, Alana, Toxa and Misty set out for Kainas, while Ele sneaks along without permission. Toxa supports Rimzan against the thieves' attack on the headquarters, and using Misty's knowledge, they plan a counter-offensive. Former Vigilance member Bachstail arrives and re-enlists, much to the chagrin of Lacryma. Rimzan assigns two parties to fight the thieves, each led by Lacryma and Duran. Before leaving, Troy gives Alana sketches of an illegal text and later asks Bachstail to read another copy. Bachstail states that they pertain to a forbidden original Kartia. Each party runs into problems during the operation. Toxa repeatedly leaves for the Shinon estate to visit Mona when he should be fighting, Ele accidentally tells Lacryma about Misty's past and Bachstail's actions causes Karis to retreat as soon as she spots him. After dealing with these struggles, the two teams are able to stop the thieves led by Cross and Zakuro. Rimzan departs for Nordia, leaving Lacryma in charge of Vigilance. Rimzan is seriously injured fighting Akueldo leader Saradiart, while Karis observes with Akueldo commander Raguruzet. Saradiart seems immortal, but Raguruzet states that he can be killed with the original Death Kartia. After the battle, Karis stays behind to treat Rimzan's wounds and vows to stop Saradiart. She later discovers both the original Death and Life Kartias in the Idorus Encrypter School and plans to inform Bachstail.

Cross threatens to fully expose Misty's past connections with Akueldo, resulting in her divulging that Mona is still at Shinon's estate. She confesses what she knows about the rebels to Duran and he pledges to stay with her. Bachstail receives Karis' note and lets the messenger know that Lacryma can be made an Inquirer, even without Aile's permission. Bachstail compares the two sketches of the forbidden Kartia from Karis and Troy and concludes that one of them is fake. A missive from the King of Cross Land orders Vigilance to support the Cross Land knights against Akueldo. Lacryma's group accepts and heads to the frontlines, while Toxa's party declines and returns to Shinon's estate to secure Mona. Before leaving, Lacryma visits the Kainas Shrine where she spots Bachstail confronting Aile about Kainas' death. Aile denies using an original Kartia as doing so would also kill the user. Bachstail's presence on the mission clearly distracts Lacryma and hinders her ability to lead. Kun ends up going on patrol on his own and runs into the Akueldo commander Vandor. Kun recognizes the commander from a painting as Kainas and asks him to meet Lacryma. Vandor declines, stating that his old life is long gone but he will wait for her at Idorus Fortress. Kun tells Troy, Ele and Bachstail what he has learned and they agree to keep it secret from Lacryma. After defeating the rebels within Cross Land, Lacryma receives orders to join the Inquirers. To further convince her, Bachstail states that Kainas is alive and has joined the rebels.

After fighting off the rebels at the Shinon estate, Mona reveals that druids like herself are half-elves and that Saradiart is her twin brother. The rebels wish to create the floating paradise of Eden, which requires the original Heaven and Earth Kartias made of elven bone and blood. Despite Toxa's objections, Shinon and Duran send Mona away to Pentagram. After she leaves the estate, Duran and Misty realize that the escort was a disguised rebel. Toxa's party pursues Mona, but are blocked by Idorus knights that have joined the rebellion. Misty distracts a large number of the enemy but is captured, while Karis comes to Toxa's rescue. She reveals that she and Bachstail are Inquirers and that she will help Toxa free Mona and Misty if he takes the Death Kartia from the Idorus Encrypter School. Toxa agrees to the plan and is able to retrieve the original. Lacryma volunteers to bait the rebels in Idorus, both to see her father and prove she doesn't need to be an Inquirer to do her job. At Idorus Fortress she questions Vandor as to why he has joined the Akueldo rebels. He reveals that her deceased mother, Shell, can be revived using the original Human Kartia located on Eden. Mona visits Lacryma in her cell and gives her the Nothingness Kartia, believing she'll do right with it. Back at Vigilance's camp, Karis arrives and informs Bachstail of the plan to rescue Lacryma, Mona and Misty from the rebels.

Toxa's party attacks Idorus Fortress from the front, while Lacryma's friends break her out of the dungeon and escape by boat. Karis is able to free Misty, but Mona has been moved to the Akueldo headquarters. Saradiart arrives and Toxa uses the original Death Kartia from the Idorus Encrypter School, which seems to kill Saradiart. Later, the Pentagram Cardinal Belthshumeltz cuts off Saradiart's left arm to create a new original Heaven Kartia. Back at the Kainas Shrine, Lacryma confronts Aile about her parents. He recounts how Lacryma died from disease twelve years ago and that Shell used the original Life Kartia to bring her back, killing Shell in the process. Lacryma opens Shell's grave but discovers no remains and runs off, but Bachstail stays behind and finds the real original Death Kartia inside. Since Toxa used a forgery, Saradiart revives and swears vengeance on his former allies. He summons Eden with the original Earth Kartia, which falls and crushes Idorus. Saradiart's elven blood allows him to use an original without fear of death.

Bachstail abandons Vigilance with the real Death Kartia in his possession and Lacryma accepts the position of Inquirer. Both parties make their way towards Nordia to confront the remains of Akueldo. Lacryma meets up with Rimzan, who seized part of a broken text from the rebels. Troy uses it to complete his illegal sketches, determines that it is the original Human Kartia and that Vandor will be unable to create a copy without it. Meanwhile, Toxa meets with an elder elf and learns that Eden is the native home of Phantoms. The elder elf also mentions that Mona's powers can stop Saradiart and end the chaos. The elves give Toxa's party flying dragons to hasten their journey towards Nordia. They head towards the Nordia Encrypter School, where Lacryma's group awaits. Toxa gives a speech to rouse the troops, but Ele notices that Lacryma is still visibly shaken. Lacryma's party fights Vandor, but Kun stops her from killing her father. With new found resolve, Vandor calls himself Kainas once again and Troy gives him the finished text for the Human Kartia. Kainas asks Lacryma to stop Belthshumeltz while he battles Raguruzet.

Toxa's party fights Saradiart, but the half-elf proves too powerful. Before Saradiart can defeat them, Bachstail enters with the real original Death Kartia and kills Saradiart, but vanishes soon after. Lacryma takes the flying dragons to Pentagram Cathedral and stops Belthshumeltz, but he unleashes the original Heaven Kartia before dying. To prevent another disaster, Lacryma uses Mona's Nothingness Kartia to counter the destructive sky created by Heaven. Lacryma disappears from Rebus but finds herself on Eden. She encounters Bachstail, who explains that Kartia is merely a means of transporting materials and creatures from Eden to Rebus, and that those that use originals are transported back. Eden's resources have depleted with the heavy use of Kartia and Bachstail now wishes to find a way to restore balance to both dimensions. Kainas uses the original Human Kartia to bring Lacryma back to Rebus and is transported to Eden himself. During the interim, father and daughter say goodbye to each other. Toxa learns that Saradiart actually made clones of himself and only a single copy was destroyed. Mona seals her brother's power and gives Toxa a fighting chance. After finally beating Saradiart, all of Eden returns to their home dimension, including the wild Phantoms, Mona and the other elves. However, Mona makes a clone of herself to simultaneously live on Rebus with Toxa.

== Development ==
Kartia was developed by the internal R&D1 studio of Atlus, the studio behind the Megami Tensei franchise. The staff included several Megami Tensei veterans including producer Kouji Okada, scenarist Kazunori Sakai, and designer Shirō Takashima. Atlus USA originally released Kartia as a Blockbuster Video rental exclusive on August 7, 1998, though it was released for retail sale ten days later. There is a slight variant in the packaging: the BBV rental version does not have foil lettering for the title "Kartia" on the front cover – it is a blue that nearly blends in with the background. The BBV rental version has a different disc number as well – it is PSRM-010600.

== Reception ==
Reception

Aggregate score
Aggregator	Score
GameRankings	75%

Review scores
Publication	Score
CNET Gamecenter	7/10
Electronic Gaming Monthly	8.25/10
Famitsu	31/40
Game Informer	8.5/10
GameSpot	7.7/10
IGN	8/10
Next Generation	4/5 stars
PlayStation Official Magazine – UK	6/10
Official U.S. PlayStation Magazine	4/5 stars
RPGamer	7/10

The game sold 117,594 units in Japan and 60,000 units in the United States, adding up to 177,594 units sold in Japan and the United States.

The game received favorable reviews according to the review aggregation website GameRankings. Next Generation said of the game, "With an excellent soundtrack, a competent translation, and a host of immersive and innovative features, Atlus succeeds in showing that it has what it takes to go to bat against the competition in the role-playing genre and emerge a winner." In Japan, Famitsu gave it a score of 31 out of 40.

The game was praised by GameSpot for its presentation, music, and the number of options available during gameplay, but found to be too linear and the battles slightly monotonous. GamePro said: "If you're a role-playing freak who enjoys strategically moving troops on maps and fighting wars with your mind, Kartia is the perfect game for you. It's not quite as good as Final Fantasy Tactics or Tactics Ogre, but the two-player mode and unique features make it worth the price of war... or a weekend rental." (Note: GamePro gave the game two 4/5 scores for graphics and fun factor, 3.5/5 for sound, and 4.5/5 for control.)

The game was nominated for the "Best Strategy" award at the 1998 OPM Editors' Awards, which went to Final Fantasy Tactics.
