= Penguin Wars =

1985 video game

- North American Game Boy box art
- Developers: UPL; Home Data (Famicom, iOS); Pax Softnica (Famicom); ASCII (Game Boy, home computers); Matrix Software (Mobile)
- Publishers: JP: UPL (arcade); JP: ASCII (consoles, home computers); NA: Nexoft (Game Boy); EU: Nintendo (Game Boy); G-Mode (Mobile); Enterbrain (iOS)
- Programmer: Tsutomu Fujisawa
- Platforms: Arcade; MSX; Famicom; PC-8801; FM-7; Sharp X1; Sharp MZ-2500; Game Boy
- Release: 1985
- Genre: Action
- Modes: Single-player, multiplayer

Penguin-Kun Wars (Note: Japanese: ぺんぎんくんWARS, Hepburn: Pengin-kun WARS) is an action video game developed and published by UPL for arcades. It was ported to numerous platforms by ASCII under the title Penguin Wars. A port developed by ASCII the Game Boy, Penguin-Kun Wars Vs., was the only version to be released outside Japan; it was released in North America as Penguin Wars by Nexoft and in Europe as King of the Zoo by Nintendo. The main background music in most versions of the game is an electronic rendition of "Motto Sekkin Shimasho" (もっと接近しましょ, loosely, "Let's Get Closer") a song originally performed by 1980s J-Pop singer Hidemi Ishikawa (石川秀美, Ishikawa Hidemi) (in turn a translation of "The Glamorous Life" performed by Sheila E.).

== Gameplay ==
Gameplay screenshot of the Game Boy version

Victory screenshot of the Game Boy version

The player participates in a sport called "Dojiball" (ドジボール, dojibōru), a pun on the Japanese pronunciation of "Dodgeball". In the arcade and Famicom editions of the game, the five animals featured are the penguin, bear, panda, koala and beaver, with the penguin being controlled by the player. In the Game Boy version, the player can choose as any one of the five animals, which, in addition to the penguin, are a cow, rabbit, bat, and rat. In all versions of the game, the player plays against all the other animals. In each game, the participating animals find each other on opposite sides of a square table with five balls on each side. The object of the game is to roll those balls over the table. As soon as all ten balls are on one player's side, that player loses the game. Each game also has a time limit of 60 seconds; if that is reached, the player with the fewest balls on their side wins.

If a player is hit by one of the balls, they are knocked unconscious for a certain amount of time. Thus, it could also be said that part of the object of the game is to hit the opponent, as otherwise it would not be possible to get all ten balls to the other side (the opponent can just roll them back before all of them have arrived).

The different animals have different strengths and weaknesses which are a trade-off with each other. For example, the rat is the one that can move left and right the fastest, but in return he can roll the balls only very slowly. The cow, on the other hand, is a very slow walker, but in return she regains consciousness more quickly.

After thirty seconds of playing, a jellybean-like obstacle appears in the middle of the table which moves left and right. Later levels have different kinds of these obstacles cause varying effects on the trajectory of the balls; some deflect them so they start rolling diagonally, whereas others simply have the ball bounce straight back.

== Reception ==
In Japan, Game Machine listed Penguin Wars on their August 1, 1985 issue as being the fourteenth most-successful table arcade unit of the month.

== Legacy ==
Hamster Corporation holds the rights to the game following their acquisition of UPL's intellectual property. They released the game as part of their Arcade Archives series for the Nintendo Switch and PlayStation 4 in 2020.

A remake of the game developed by City Connection, simply named Penguin Wars, was released for the Nintendo Switch was released in Japan on September 21, 2017, and on June 27, 2019 in North America and Europe. The PlayStation 4 version was released in January 2019.

== See also ==
- Pikiinya!
