= Kouji Okada =

Japanese video game producer and director

- 岡田 耕始
- Okada in 2010
- Born: February 22, 1964 (age 62); Asakusa, Tokyo, Japan
- Occupations: Video game director, producer
- Employer(s): Tecmo (1984–1986); Atlus (1986–2003); Gaia (2003–2010)
- Known for: Co-creating Megami Tensei and Persona

Kouji Okada (岡田 耕始, Okada Kōji; born February 22, 1964) is a Japanese video game producer and director.

== History ==
Beginning his career in the early 1980s with stints at Universal Technos and Tecmo, Okada went on to become one of the founders of Atlus in 1986, as well as co-creating the Megami Tensei and Persona series of role-playing games. After leaving Atlus in 2003, Okada formed the studio Gaia, which he led until its dissolution in 2010.

In January 2026, Okada was reported to be involved in the production of Villion:Code.

== Works ==
Year	Title	Role
1985	Gridiron Fight	Cabinet designer
1985	All American Football	Cabinet designer
1985	Tehkan World Cup	Cabinet designer
1985	Pinball Action	Cabinet designer
1987	Labyrinth	Game designer
1987	Digital Devil Story: Megami Tensei	Game designer, programmer
1990	Digital Devil Story: Megami Tensei II	Game designer, programmer
1991	Quiz Marugoto The World	Quiz creation support
1992	Shin Megami Tensei	Programmer
1994	Shin Megami Tensei II	Director
1994	Shin Megami Tensei if...	Director
1995	Shin Megami Tensei: Devil Summoner	Director
1996	Revelations: Persona	Director
1997	Devil Summoner: Soul Hackers	Director
1998	Kartia: The Word of Fate	Producer
1999	Persona 2: Innocent Sin	Producer
1999	Maken X	Producer
2000	Persona 2: Eternal Punishment	Producer
2000	Devil Children – Black Book and Red Book	Producer
2001	Devil Children – White Book	Producer
2001	Wizardry: Tale of the Forsaken Land	Executive producer
2002	DemiKids: Light Version and Dark Version	Producer
2002	Shin Megami Tensei: Nine	Producer
2003	Shin Megami Tensei III: Nocturne	Producer
2003	Devil Children – Book of Fire and Book of Ice	Producer
2004	Digital Devil Saga	Executive producer
2006	Monster Kingdom: Jewel Summoner	Producer
2007	Folklore	Creative producer
2008	Coded Soul: Uketsugareshi Idea	Producer
2026	Villion: Code	Producer
