= Shin Megami Tensei: Nine =

2002 role-playing game

- Cover art
- Developers: Atlus; NexTech
- Publisher: Atlus
- Director: Kazunori Sakai
- Producer: Kouji Okada
- Programmer: Akihiro Yoshida
- Artists: Yasuomi Umetsu; Kazuma Kaneko
- Writers: Nobutaka Shimizu; Yumiko Kurihara; Yutaka Toyama
- Composers: Takahiro Ogata; Masaki Kurokawa
- Series: Megami Tensei
- Platform: Xbox
- Release: JP: December 5, 2002
- Genre: Role-playing
- Mode: Single-player

Shin Megami Tensei: Nine (Note: (真・女神転生 NINE; lit. True Goddess Reincarnation: Nine)) is a 2002 role-playing video game developed by Atlus and NexTech, and published by Atlus for the Xbox. Forming part of the Megami Tensei series, Nine takes place in the period of time between Shin Megami Tensei and its sequel, with the survivors of Tokyo's destruction sheltering in underground bunkers. Taking on the role of a debugger, the player navigates the Idea Space virtual world set up by the survivors of Tokyo's destruction, which has come under attack by demonic beings called "noise". The gameplay has the player navigating a customized avatar in third-person through the virtual world of Tokyo, battling enemies using a real-time command-based battle system. The game's title refers to the number of possible moral alignments available to players.

Shin Megami Tensei: Nine began development in 2001, following staff discussions about how to make an online Shin Megami Tensei game. It was the first Megami Tensei title for Xbox, and the first to fully utilize 3D graphics. Established Megami Tensei staff worked on the project, such as producer Kouji Okada and demon designer Kazuma Kaneko. Newcomers to the project included character designer Yasuomi Umetsu, and composers Masaki Kurokawa and Takahiro Ogata. While Nine was originally planned as an online game, it was split into single-player and online versions; the latter was cancelled following development difficulties. The single-player release met with mixed reception from critics, and sold below Atlus' estimates; its commercial failure coupled with development costs contributed to a financial loss. Development of the online version continued as a port for Microsoft Windows, which would eventually become Shin Megami Tensei: Imagine.

== Gameplay ==
A battle in Shin Megami Tensei: Nine: the player (left, wearing green) and their demons face an enemy demon (top-middle).

Shin Megami Tensei: Nine is a role-playing video game primarily set in a cyberspace version of 1990s Tokyo, with players taking control of the silent main protagonist to explore various environments within Tokyo's districts, along with switching between different districts with a dedicated fast-travel menu. The player can adjust the protagonist's name, gender, hair and skin color. Navigation through environments is presented through a third-person perspective, with the player character being followed by one assigned demon. While navigating safe areas, players can enter shops to buy new equipment and items such as healing potions, and change their character's clothing and hairstyle.

Combat is triggered through random encounters in environments such as dungeons. Combat in Nine plays out as a real-time combat in an enclosed battle arena: while the battle continues automatically without direct interaction from the player, commands can be issued to party members to perform actions when their turn comes. In addition to specific commands, general offensive or defensive stances can be issued. Battles do not reward experience points as in other Megami Tensei games: instead, equipped jewels affect the protagonist's strengths and stats. As with previous Megami Tensei games, players can negotiate with demons and get them to join their party. Demons can also be fused together to create more powerful demons. The attitudes of demons towards the player changes depending on the current moon phase. The number of demons the player can summon depends on the player's and the demon's "kilodevil" values: a player with 100 kilodevil can summon two 50-kilodevil demons. The player can compress their demons by visiting the Cathedral of Shadows, halving the demons' kilodevil values and allowing the player to summon more demons.

At certain points in the game, the player also enters a "hacking" mode, which plays out in a real-time strategy simulation: the protagonist and their companions navigate within closed arenas along pre-set pathways, knocking out nodes blocking the path, and defending against protection bots attempting to stop them. As the player progresses through the game, the character makes dialogue choices that are mapped across a three-by-three alignment matrix: three "down" (Law, Neutral and Chaos), and three "across" (Light, Neutral and Dark). The protagonist's current alignment not only influences the story, but also the loyalty and responsiveness of demon party members.

== Synopsis ==
Nine is set in the year "202X", taking place during the latter half of Shin Megami Tensei and in the time leading up to its sequel Shin Megami Tensei II. In the wake of the ICBM attack on Tokyo, communities of survivors now live in underground cities. In the face of their predicament, the underground inhabitants create "Idea Space", a virtual world based on Tokyo from the 1990s. The protagonist, named Kei Azuma by default, is exploring the virtual world when "Noise", digitized demons hostile to humans, appear and begin attacking Idea Space players through their avatars. After fending off an attack, Azuma is employed by the Central Administration Bureau as a Debugger, a player who traverses Idea Space and repels Noise invasions. During their missions through Idea Space, Azuma meets with multiple characters: Baraki/Sumire, a childhood friend who represents "Chaos", Mubiora/Miranda, a representative from the Central Administration Bureau who represents "Law". While going through their duty as a Debugger, the events of the latter half of Shin Megami Tensei take place, which culminate in all parts of Tokyo being destroyed in a Great Flood triggered by the God-worshipping Order of Messiah: Azuma survives due to their body being in cold storage, meaning that their mind becomes linked to Idea Space along with their Law and Chaos allies.

During a mission into the virtual Shibuya 109 against the Noise demon Abaddon, the true origins of Idea Space are revealed. Idea Space was created by humans tired of awaiting the arrival of their "Messiah" in the real world after a great flood wiped out most of humanity: Idea Space was used as a basis for cloning a new humanity for the Millennial Kingdom, with the deity Maria as Idea Space's supervising AI, most of the population being androids or data creations. On their mission into Shibuya 109, Azuma retrieves a Desire Disc, an artifact containing the saved desires of humanity that is the key to both sides' plans. Azuma is faced with choices about which faction to support. The Law faction, supported by Maria, wishes to bring peace to humanity along with releasing the Idea Space's inhabitants. The Chaos faction, which can be led by Lucifer if he is freed from his prison within a metaphysical plain called the Expanse, intends to destroy the inhabitants of Idea Space and start anew with the chosen Adam and Eve: Azuma and the Chaos companion. To fulfill any of their chosen roles, Azuma must defeat Yaldabaoth, an aspect of YHWH that seeks to destroy everything and opposes both Maria or Lucifer.

In both the Law and Chaos routes, with the defeat of the Yaldabaoth, the entire Idea Space is emptied of avatars besides Azuma. Upon returning to the real world, they are on the surface with either their Law or Chaos companion, with the Messian-built Tokyo Millennium in the background: depending on the alignment, Azuma either surrenders to the Law-based regime's plan for a Millennial Kingdom, or depart for the outside world. In the "Neutral" routes, Azuma performs tasks for a mysterious woman minding a store in Idea Space: the woman is the goddess Sophia, who was forced to reincarnate as a human for the sin of birthing Yaldabaoth. She has been helping Azuma towards defeating Yaldabaoth to atone for her sin and restore her divine form, allowing her to being leading humanity into the Pleroma.

== Development ==
Shin Megami Tensei: Nine was primarily developed by Atlus, the main developer for the Megami Tensei series. The game received additional development help from NexTech, a company that would later be rebranded as Nex Entertainment and work on games such as Shining Soul and Children of Mana. The game's CGI cutscenes were developed with help from Frameworks Entertainment. Nine was produced by long-time Megami Tensei producer Kouji Okada, directed by Kazunori Sakai, and written by Nobutaka Shimizu. Kazuma Kaneko, a regular designer for the series, returned to design new demons for the title. Many of them, such as the character Maria, proved challenging for him due to his past work mainly involving creating depictions of God and Lucifer as opposed to goddess-like figures. He also found making them move convincingly in the new 3D environment problematic. Kaneko suggested that a new artist be brought on as a collaborator on the project, so Yasuomi Umetsu was hired to design the game's main characters. This was part of an attempt to distinguish Nine from previous Megami Tensei games.

The concept for Nine originated during staff discussions about how Shin Megami Tensei would work as an online title, taking form as a spin-off title similar to Shin Megami Tensei If... the Devil Summoner series. Development started at some point in 2001, and was still in its early stages of development in October of that year. During its early stages, the game was known as Shin Megami Tensei Online. Although the team had the option of making NINE an online-exclusive title, Okada wanted a single-player mode to introduce players to the workings and world of the game. A part of the planned online component was teaming up with or fighting different players depending on their alignment. Nine is not the ninth game in Shin Megami Tensei series; the title refers to the number of moral alignments that are available in the Shin Megami Tensei games. The decision to create a nine-tiered alignment system was because Okada wanted to explore the original game's moral alignments in more detail. This was also the reason why the game was set between Shin Megami Tensei and its sequel. The setting was directly based on Tokyo's Shinjuku, Shibuya and Ikebukuro districts. The game was the first Megami Tensei title developed for the Xbox; the first to switch over to a third-person camera perspective from the first-person perspectives of earlier Megami Tensei titles; the first to feature a customizable player avatar; and the first Megami Tensei game to feature fully 3D graphics, something previously accomplished with Maken X, a 1999 standalone game for the Dreamcast. Okada described the development process as "challenging", with developing the new real-time battle system being a large part of that challenge. Two prevalent issues were adjusting the balance of the battle system, and incorporating the second tactical system for the hacking segments.

The game's sound and music were handled by Takahiro Ogata, Masaki Kurokawa and Kenichi Tsuchiya: Ogata acted as sound director. To accurately create the sound of modern-day Tokyo within Nine, Ogata and Kurokawa went to districts such as Kichijōji and Roppongi to make recordings of ambient sounds at different times of day. While there was a general theme for various city districts, the music subtly changed depending on the player's overall alignment: for instance, to represent the Law and Chaos alignments in the game, piano was used for the former and guitar for the latter. Battle music also featured randomly-generated soundtrack variations, with Ogata estimating somewhere over three hundred possible variants on battle themes. A major improvement enabled by the Xbox was the use of 5.1 surround sound, which could enable richer use of both music and in-game sound effects. According to Okada, this additional sound capacity would compensate for what could not be managed at a visual level. Maken X had already given the team a chance to use 3D sound, but Nine was the first title to make major use of 5.1, and implementing it alongside all the other features proved a challenge for the team.

== Release ==
Nine was originally announced in August 2001 under the title Shin Megami Tensei Online. Originally rumored to be for the PS2, its announced features included use of voice recognition and online broadband services. These features would later be clarified as being planned for online implementation rather than in development. After a long period of media silence, its official title was announced in February 2002. Nine was heavily promoted at multiple Japanese gaming events throughout 2002. The game released on December 5, 2002: it was celebrated with an official launch event attended by Okada and Kaneko. A Deluxe Edition released simultaneously with the standard edition, containing a figurine of Maria and a keycard related to accessing online content. The game was later re-released as part of Microsoft's Platinum Collection budget collection on October 23, 2003. A novelization, written by Takumi Miyajima and with a cover illustration by Kaneko, was published by Fujimi Shobo on March 25, 2003. A comics anthology was released by Enterbrain on March 24.

After the 2002 Electronic Entertainment Expo (E3), it was stated by Atlus that while the small size of the game's online component did not rule out a Western release, Atlus themselves were unable to finance a dedicated server and other companies such as Microsoft were unlikely to provide such funding. The following year at E3 2003, Atlus responded with "no comment" when asked whether Nine would see a Western release. In 2006, Atlus stated that there were no plans to bring Nine overseas, with their focus being on newer Megami Tensei titles.

The online functions planned for Nine were intended to be incorporated from release, but in August 2002, Atlus announced that they would divide the game in two parts: one stand-alone offline version, and one online version. The reason given for this was that the development team did not have enough time to integrate all online functions they wanted to include in the game, and that Atlus did not want to delay the game's release. Atlus planned to release the online version in 2002, but put development on hold due to the high costs of developing an online game, and postponed the release until 2003. In August 2003, they announced that they no longer had any plans to publish the online version for Xbox, due to problems relating to network-based development and the profitability of online games. With the cancellation of the Xbox Live version, development continued on a version of Nine for Microsoft Windows personal computers (PCs). This version formed the base for what would become Shin Megami Tensei: Imagine, a massively multiplayer online role-playing game for PCs developed by Cave and released in Japan and Western regions across 2007 and 2009.

== Reception ==
Reception

Review scores
Publication	Score
Famitsu Weekly	9/10, 8/10, 7/10, 7/10
Famitsu Xbox	8/10, 8/10, 8/10, 7/10

Despite the heavy promotion it received, upon release the game only reached #18 in the Dengeki charts with initial sales of 14,000 units. Its sales continued to fall and within three weeks the game had dropped out of the Dengeki Top 50. By the end of the year, Nine had sold just over 30,000. According to Atlus, the game's sales by the end of the 2002–2003 fiscal year had reached 45,000 units: this fell below their planned sales number of 67,000 units. In May, Atlus announced that the development costs and poor sales of Xbox games, including Nine, had resulted in a financial loss for that year.

Four writers for Famitsu reviewed the game. On the positive side, demon fusion and negotiation being cited as "addictive", and two of the reviewers lauded the shift into 3D graphics. On the negative side, aspects of the battle system was seen as convoluted or confusing, while other elements such as a confusing interface and the conspicuous lack of online functions brought the experience down. One reviewer also noted that the game was geared towards those who had already played Shin Megami Tensei. In Famitsu Xbox, some reviewers complimented the gameplay with one saying the unique RTS-styled combat was so polished that it could easily be its own standalone game. Two reviewers found that the game may be difficult to get into initially for newcomers to the series.

RPGFan's John McCarrol was positive in his early preview despite not knowing much about the promised online functions, saying that despite some bland visuals Nine promised to be "one of the best Xbox games released in Japan and possibly North America". Kurt Kalata and Christopher J. Snelgrove, writing for gaming website Hardcore Gaming 101, had mixed feelings about the title, finding its visuals dull and gameplay system unimpressive. Due to the ultimate lack of online functionality, they also commented that Nine felt "weirdly incomplete", saying that it was "not really worth tracking down" for series fans.
