= Folklore (video game) =

2007 video game

- European cover art
- Developer: Game Republic (Note: Additional work by Japan Studio and Gaia.)
- Publisher: Sony Computer Entertainment
- Directors: Yoshiki Okamoto; Takashi Shono
- Producers: Yoshiki Okamoto; Kouji Okada
- Artists: Kohei Toda; Chichiro Matsukura
- Writer: Hidehisa Miyashita
- Composers: Kenji Kawai; Shinji Hosoe; Ayako Saso; Hiroto Saitoh
- Platform: PlayStation 3
- Release: JP: June 21, 2007; NA: October 9, 2007; EU: October 12, 2007; AU: October 18, 2007
- Genre: Action role-playing
- Mode: Single-player

Folklore (Note: Known in Japanese as FōkusuSōru -Ushinawareta Denshō- (フォークスソウル -失われた伝承-; lit. FolksSoul -The Lost Folklore-).) is a 2007 action role-playing video game developed by Game Republic and published by Sony Computer Entertainment for the PlayStation 3. Set in Ireland and the Celtic Otherworld of Irish mythology, the game follows two protagonists: a young woman named Ellen and a journalist named Keats, who work together to unravel the mysteries of the quaint village of Doolin by seeking the memories of the dead in the Netherworld.

Announced at E3 2006 and originally titled Monster Kingdom: Unknown Realms as a companion piece to Gaia's Monster Kingdom: Jewel Summoner, the game was co-directed by Yoshiki Okamoto. The first playable demo was released on the Japanese PlayStation Network in May 2007. A month later, the soundtrack album, composed by Kenji Kawai and Shinji Hosoe, was released. Folklore received generally positive reviews from critics upon release, but suffered from poor sales. Game Republic proposed two sequels for the game to Sony, but Sony did not greenlight the projects due to the low sales.

== Gameplay ==
Ellen utilizing "folk" in combat

Folklore is an action role-playing game where players control characters in a third-person view to explore their surroundings and engage in combat. From the start, players can choose to play as either Ellen or Keats, each with their own distinct, yet intertwined, storylines and play styles. The game takes place in two worlds: the real world, set in the small seaside Irish village of Doolin, and the fantastical Netherworld, which is inhabited by folk creatures and spirits.

In Doolin, players control the playable character as they explore the village and surrounding area. When in this state, characters are unable to engage in combat or use their abilities and are limited to exploring and interacting with the village's inhabitants. Doolin contains quests that progress the main story and eventually lead to and from the Netherworld, acting as a hub between worlds and subsequent quests.

In the Netherworld, the gameplay shifts to action-adventure. Basic attack techniques are performed using folk; creatures and spirits that, when defeated, can be absorbed for use by the player. When a folk is near defeat, its spirit will glow red, allowing players to absorb it by locking onto it and performing shaking and pulling motions with the Sixaxis to reel in its energy. Only four folk can be assigned to the controller's four interface/action buttons at a time. Different kinds of folk are better suited for certain situations and techniques, such as melee combat, projectile attacks, or magic. The two playable characters also have different play styles. Ellen uses a variety of folk and specializes in defense, having the ability to cloak herself with folk powers, while Keats specializes in offense, using brute-force attacks and stronger folk, and has the ability to release built-up energy to become invincible and stronger for a duration.

== Plot ==
In the present day, two people are drawn to the Irish seaside village of Doolin; Ellen, a university student with no memory of her childhood who receives a letter from her deceased mother Ingrid, and Keats, editor of the struggling occult magazine Unknown Realms, who receives a phone call from a woman who says that Faerys are attacking her. Upon their arrival at Doolin, Ellen quickly befriends villager Suzette. On the night of Samhain, Ellen and Keats enter the Netherworld, the realm of the dead, through portals and gain power over monsters called the Folk. They are respectively guided by Scarcrow and Belgae, liminal beings known as Half-lives. Ellen meets and allies with the Faery King, who seeks to restore the Netherworld's Core and defeat a faction of rebel Faerys, while Keats allies with the rebel leader Livane, whom Belgae serves. The Faery King reveals his true goal of merging the Netherworld with the human world due to their conflict having driven the Netherworld into despair, but Livane, who is the last descendant of a human clan that sealed off the Netherworld from humanity, seeks to maintain the separation. Meanwhile, murders begin to occur in Doolin, with the victims being people who knew something about Ellen's past, with Ellen helping the survivors by interacting with their spirits in the Netherworld.

During her adventure, Ellen learns that when she was a child, she lived in Doolin under the name Cecilia, with her family sharing the same lineage as Livane. She befriended Herve, who was terminally ill; after Cecilia was injured in an accident, Herve donated her blood to save her through a blood transfusion, but died as a result. Her death caused the town to hate Cecilia, as they considered her to be responsible for her death, but a Faery had been possessing and influencing them. Ingrid killed Herve's father when he attacked Ellen, then hid Ellen in the Netherworld and fled from Doolin with her. Herve's mother wrote the letter that Ellen had received, having planned to kill her, but Ingrid's spirit killed her before she could do so. Suzette is revealed to be the current culprit, having sought to stop Ellen from learning the truth about her past after seeing Ingrid's spirit.

Upon reaching the Netherworld Core, which has been corrupted by human malice, the Faery King is killed. After recovering her memories, Ellen decides to keep the worlds separate and is forced to fight Scarecrow with help from Keats and Livane after he absorbs the malice and declares that he will spread death to the living world. In the Netherworld Core, Ellen remembers that Livane told her of the place's power and that she had used her blood to make a wish for people to cherish life, creating Scarecrow. Ellen finds Livane, who, as she is dying, tasks her with helping anguished humans through the Netherworld. Keats learns that he is a Half-life created by Herve's dying wish and mentally summoned to Doolin by Herve's wish to protect Ellen; the magazine Unknown Realms had closed down shortly before Eliot's death, and his appearance is based on Ellen's childhood drawing of what Herve would have looked like as an adult. The game ends with Suzette disappearing, Ellen leaving Doolin with its inhabitants better off, and Keats being visited by a grateful Ellen at his office in the Netherworld.

== Development ==
Folklore was announced at E3 2006 which was said to be "The next generation of dark fantasy." It was to be developed by Game Republic, under Yoshiki Okamoto, a video game designer who worked on popular games, including Resident Evil. The game was originally titled Monster Kingdom: Unknown Realms, and was intended as a companion piece to Gaia's Monster Kingdom: Jewel Summoner. However, disappointing sales of Jewel Summoner led to the game being retitled Folklore. Gaia however would assist the development of Folklore, contributing monster designs. Numerous creatures appearing in Folklore would later appear in Gaia's PlayStation Portable game Coded Soul: Uketsugareshi Idea the following year, which also featured connectivity with Folklore.

A playable demo was first released on the Japanese PlayStation Network (PSN) on May 30, 2007. The demo features the two playable characters Keats and Ellen, with the ability to choose from either of them. The demo includes a series of short comic-style cutscenes, exploration of a sea-side village and a trek through a series of playable areas where a player is introduced to the gameplay basics (i.e. fighting, how to acquire new Ids, etc.). This demo was all in Japanese aside from the lines in English that both protagonists would occasionally exclaim during combat.

An English-speech demonstration was released on the European PSN on August 22, 2007; as a limited time offering, it was removed from the PlayStation Store on August 31. This demo was released to the North American PSN on August 23, 2007. An English/Traditional Chinese speech version demo was released on the Asian PSN on September 4, 2007. The original Japanese demo was released in English on European and US PlayStation Network Stores.

== Soundtrack ==
FolksSoul: The Lost Folklore

Soundtrack album by Kenji Kawai, Shinji Hosoe, Ayako Saso and Hiroto Saitoh, arranged by Kenji Kawai
- Released: June 27, 2007 (Japan)
- Genre: Video game soundtrack
- Length: 172:40 (three CDs)
- Label: Team Entertainment

The official Folklore soundtrack was released on 3 discs on June 27, 2007, by TEAM Entertainment. The music was composed by Kenji Kawai, Shinji Hosoe, Ayako Saso and Hiroto Saitoh. The song "Nephilim" by Japanese band Abingdon Boys School plays during the end credits.

FolksSoul Original Soundtrack track listing
Disc 1: 1. The Beginning of the Journey; 2. A Mysterious Door; 3. The Netherworld; 4. Solitude; 5. Resolution; 6. Awakening; 7. Rumbling; 8. Mystery; 9. The Fairy Waltz; 10. Crisis; 11. Escaping the Myth; 12. Where the Flowers are Scattered; 13. A Voice from the Past; 14. Resurfacing Past; 15. Speaking With the Dead; 16. Endless Battlefield; 17. Menace; 18. Avalon	Disc 2: 1. Ancient Breath; 2. An Undertaking; 3. Impact; 4. Visited Tragedy; 5. Land of the Gods; 6. An Arranged History; 7. Trial; 8. The Serpent's Lair; 9. Sorrow; 10. Distant Memories; 11. The Forgotten Village; 12. Irish Lullaby; 13. Danny Boy; 14. Between Life and Death; 15. Rest	Disc 3: 1. To the Unknown World; 2. Engraved Time; 3. Map of Penfield; 4. In the Land of Judgement; 5. Courtroom; 6. The Judge and the Judged; 7. The End of the Memories; 8. Showdown; 9. The Darkness Within; 10. Truth; 11. Determination; 12. Under a Falling Star; 13. Sovereign Vessel; 14. Skilled Spear; 15. Transfiguration; 16. Those Who Must Fear; 17. The Beginning of the End; 18. Collapse; 19. Where the Soul Goes

== Reception ==
Reception

Aggregate score
Aggregator	Score
Metacritic	75/100

Review scores
Publication	Score
Edge	5/10
Electronic Gaming Monthly	7/10
Eurogamer	5/10
Famitsu	33/40
Game Informer	7.25/10
GameDaily	4/10
GameRevolution	C+
GameSpot	7/10
GameSpy	4/5
GameTrailers	7.2/10
IGN	9/10
PlayStation: The Official Magazine	8/10
RPGamer	4.5/5
RPGFan	82%

Upon release, Folklore received "favorable" reviews according to video game review aggregator Metacritic. In Japan, Famitsu gave it a score of three eights and a nine, for a total of 33 out of 40. GamePro said, "What saves this game from being just another monster collection RPG is the compelling narrative and the unique environments. I am also looking forward to the downloadable content which should help keep things fresh in the future. Although it isn't perfect, Folklore is definitely one fairy tale worth finishing." (Note: GamePro gave the game three 4/5 scores for graphics, sound, and fun factor, and 4.25/5 for control.)

Most of the praise the game received was direct at the art design and a rich fairy tale/mythological setting and style. Ryan Clements of IGN was particularly impressed with the game's style over the actual technical graphics engine, noting that "Folklore's sheer visual beauty comes more from the stellar art direction and execution of the artistic design than the amount of processing power it requires," helped further by the soundtrack described as "poignant and intrinsically atmospheric." This view was further echoed by Gaming Target, summing up with "technically the game looks great, with the realistic style of Doolin, mixed in with the colorful and absurdly Japanese stylings of the Netherworld levels," later including Folklore in their "52 Games We'll Still Be Playing From 2007."

The battle system where players would catch and utilize various "folk" was considered another positive aspect. GameSpy found that "what makes the enormous library of monsters and moves work so well is that each is most useful in a particular situation" and while GameTrailers also praised the feature finding that "switching folk in and out of your arsenal is easy thanks to well-organized menus," it also criticized brief loading times between shifting in and out of the menus that "puts a damper on the game’s flow." Eurogamer on the other hand felt that the basic level design was "pretty standard dungeon crawling," if not "bland" at times. The use of the SIXAXIS motion control to reel in energy from downed folk was considered a better use of the feature compared to past games, with 1Up.com calling it "the most subtle and sensible use of the PS3's motion control yet."

While the narrative was considered a strong point, with GameZone (who gave it nine out of ten) calling it "compelling," the method of telling much of the story in graphic-novel style still cutscenes however received a less than positive response. Kevin VanOrd of GameSpot felt that while "an interesting design choice" is, in the end "weirdly flavorless." Another issue found in this method was the lack of voice-work outside of the full CGI cutscenes with GamesRadar+ (in-house) finding it to hinder the delivery of the overall story.

=== Cancelled sequel ===
Game Republic proposed two sequels for the game, a proper game for the PlayStation Portable and a download-only game utilizing the PlayStation Move to Sony. The idea was well received by Sony but due to poor sales of the original Folklore were not keen to green light the project which failed to pass the internal review board at Sony by a few points.
