= Coded Soul =

2008 video game

- Developer: Gaia (Note: Additional work by Japan Studio.)
- Publisher: Sony Computer Entertainment
- Producer: Kouji Okada
- Artist: Raita Kazama
- Writer: Takumi Miyajima
- Composers: Hitoshi Sakimoto; Masaharu Iwata; Mitsuhiro Kaneda; Kimihiro Abe
- Platform: PlayStation Portable
- Release: JP: February 7, 2008
- Genre: Action role-playing
- Mode: Single-player

Coded Soul (Note: Known in Japan as Coded Soul: Uketsugareshi Idea (Coded Soul -受け継がれしイデア-; lit. Coded Soul: Inherited Idea).) is a 2008 action role-playing game developed by Gaia and published by Sony Computer Entertainment for the PlayStation Portable. Initially released only in Japan, it was Gaia's final game to be published by Sony as well as their final game to be on a PlayStation console.

The game was re-released digitally on June 20, 2023 as an emulated classic for PlayStation 4 and PlayStation 5 in Chinese; marking its release outside Japan for the first time.

== Gameplay ==
Gameplay in Coded Soul revolves around Jay's exploration of the randomly generated dungeons of Idea. You're limited in the amount of time you can spend in the world, with your time limit replenished only by reaching key check points. Along the way, you face off against beasts using an action-oriented battle system. The game also has the Okada staples like a weapon and item synthesis system and a "Karma" system through which you make your monsters learn new skills. Connectivity with Folklore is included due to Gaia assisting on that game's development, with various enemies from Folklore appearing in the game.

== Plot ==
An army has been conducting research into Monolith Gate, the door to the world of ‘Idea’. That door is controlled by Gale, a young boy who gives Jay, a soldier special power to travel to the other side to save his girlfriend, May. The special power grants the ability to control monsters by sucking up their souls. Once you've defeated a foe, you can make them into your ally for use during future battles. You can take up to two monsters with you on your treks into Idea, selecting from eventually over 100 beasts.
