= Super Mario Adventures =

Comic series

- Cover for the 2016 reprint

Publication information
- Publisher: Viz Media (English)
- Publication date: January 1, 1992 – January 31, 1993
- No. of issues: 13

Creative team
- Written by: Kentaro Takekuma
- Artist: Tamakichi Sakura

Super Mario Adventures is an anthology of comics that ran in Nintendo Power throughout 1992, featuring the characters from Nintendo's Mario series and based loosely on Super Mario World. In 1993, the series was also serialized in CoroCoro Comic in Japanese, under the title Mario's Big Adventure (Japanese: マリオの大冒険, Hepburn: Mario no daibōken). Charlie Nozawa, the artist who created the comics, is also known by the pen name Tamakichi Sakura. Kentaro Takekuma was responsible for the story, which follows Mario and Luigi as they attempt to rescue Princess Toadstool after she is kidnapped by Bowser with intent to marry her.

It marks the second time the Mario universe is developed into a livable place, as the comic was made after Nintendo Comics System and before Super Mario RPG. The only other pre-story Mario is within the animated and live-action series relating to Donkey Kong. It is notable for its use of the many gameplay devices in the Mario series as elements of everyday life. For example, Mario plays a psychologist and treats the social anxiety of a Boo, a ghost enemy in the video game series that covers its face whenever the player is facing it.

When the comic originally ran, it ran alongside a just-as-long serial based on The Legend of Zelda: A Link to the Past. Both serials were later reprinted in separate trade paperbacks published at the time of the magazine's fiftieth issue.

In 2016, Super Mario Adventures, as well as the said adaptation of The Legend of Zelda: A Link to the Past, later got a reprint, handled by publisher Viz Media.

== Plot ==
The story opens in the Mushroom Kingdom with Mario and Luigi entering the Mushroom Castle basement, where Mario gets right to work, singing as he does so. Just then, gigantic pipes start popping up in the basement and in the courtyard. Various enemies from Super Mario World pop out of the pipes and attack the guards, but the Mario Bros. fight back. Bowser comes out of the largest of the pipes in his Koopa Clown Car and proposes marriage to Princess Toadstool (known as Princess Peach in most modern English Mario media). He then leaves her one week to decide on his proposal, but she rallies her troops and takes off after him.

Mario and Luigi chase after the Princess and soon find a large egg, which cracks open to reveal a grateful dinosaur-like animal called Yoshi. Mario and Luigi feel afraid, thinking that the Yoshi might eat them, until they find that he is friendly when they see him eat a Wiggler. Yoshi takes them to the nearby Yoshi Village, where they meet Friendly Floyd and discover Yoshi's backstory. Toad arrives to inform the pair that Toadstool has been captured.

In a nearby tower surrounded by a lake, the Koopalings are contacted by Bowser, who informs them of his decision to make the Princess their stepmother and then orders the Koopalings to make sure she doesn't escape. She soon does, using a cape she finds that gives her the ability to fly.

On the other side of the lake, the Mario Bros., Toad, and Yoshi are trying to figure out a way to get to the tower. Mario rescues Luigi from a Bullet Bill which takes Mario across the lake. The Princess lands unconscious by Luigi, and Mario lands dazed in the clutches of the Koopalings.

Luigi poses as the Princess, using a mask, and is brought to Bowser. The real Princess wakes up, now dressed as Luigi, and is also determined to rescue Mario. Luigi offers to order the Koopalings a pizza, and then calls up Yoshi and Toad, who show up dressed as pizza delivery boys, but out of the boxes come the Princess and Floyd, bearing a pack of bombs that Floyd had with him. Luigi runs off to rescue his brother. Eventually, the Princess's bomb is accidentally lit from the Reznors, blowing up the tower and sending all the good guys flying back over to the other side of the moat.

Floyd parts ways with the heroes, who feel victorious due to Bowser's apparent defeat. Mario realises that there is no way to reach the entry pipe in the sky. Toad takes the Princess's cape to fly up to the pipe and send for a rescue party. Shortly afterward, some odd-looking Mushroomites show up with a rope ladder. The leader cuts the portion of the ladder with the Mario Brothers, and it is revealed that Bowser and the Koopas have taken control of the Mushroom Kingdom and the Princess is once again kidnapped.

The Mario Bros. and Yoshi give chase after the Koopas' saucer, but Bowser responds by sending down Koopa Paratroopas to attack them. Mario fights back and Yoshi eats each Paratroopa until finally he swallows a Blue Koopa Shell and grows wings. The trio eventually crash-land in front of a Ghost House. Luigi dashes into the house, smelling cheese, and Mario follows when a metal door comes down, leaving Yoshi locked out.

Mario and Luigi are surrounded by Boos, eventually meeting Big Boo. They escape through a door, and when the Boos follow, they find Mario dressed as a psychiatrist and Luigi as a nurse. Mario consults the Big Boo, who confesses that his fear of humans stems from bad childhood experiences. Now feeling better, the Big Boo and his buddies let Mario and Luigi out of the house and tell them how to get to Bowser's castle.

The Mario Bros. and Yoshi make it to the Koopa-conquered Mushroom Kingdom and find that practically every enemy character from the classic Mario games is gathering for Bowser's marriage. The trio use available pipes, and Mario gets separated from the other two.

Bowser uses Magikoopa to hypnotize the Princess into loving him, but just as the ceremony begins, Mario comes out and attacks Bowser. He is astonished to hear Princess Toadstool declaring her apparent love for Bowser, but he refuses to let that stop him, and he attempts to carry her out while Bowser orders his men to seize him.

Down in the basement, Luigi and Yoshi come upon the captured Yoshis, who are now all trapped in eggs. They get to work setting the Yoshis free. Just when the ceremony gets underway again, Luigi and the Yoshis come stampeding in, trampling all of Bowser's minions. This breaks the spell on the Princess, who then proceeds to untie Mario. Bowser tries to hide in his wedding cake, which the Yoshis begin devouring. The Yoshis are freed and peace returns to the Mushroom Kingdom.

== Dialogue changes ==
When Super Mario Adventures was reprinted in graphic novel form half a year later, some minor changes were made to the dialogue so the dialogue would make a bit more sense in context. The following lines were changed:

- Part 2, page 8, panel 6: Luigi: "Tell my stomach that!" --> "Tell your stomach that!"
- Part 3, page 4, panel 8: Luigi: "Yahoo!" --> "Yikes! What a fight!"
- Part 6, page 8, panel 2: Toad: "Onto plan B!" --> "We have a delivery to make!"
- Part 8, page 8, panel 7: Mario: "Quit clowning around, Luigi! Look!" --> "Look! I wonder if anybody's home..."
- Part 9, page 1, panel 1: Mario: "Quit clowning around, Luigi! Look!" --> "I don't see any lights on..."
- Part 9, page 5, panel 8: Koopa Kids: "He's off the royal rocker!" --> "I hate it when he's right!"
- Part 11, page 4, panel 5: Mario: "Ow ow ow!" --> "Look out!"
- Mario Vs. Wario, page 5, panel 3: Wario: "Phew! That was close!" --> Wario: "Blast! He got away!"
- Mario Vs. Wario, page 8, panel 4: Mario: "Hello there... Wario! Are you home?" --> Mario: "Wario! Long time no see!".

== Mario vs. Wario ==
Immediately following the end of Super Mario Adventures, Nintendo Power concluded the epic with a ten-page story loosely based on Super Mario Land 2: 6 Golden Coins, which ran in their January 1993 issue and was later reprinted in the graphic novel. This comic was last seen in the Greed School part of the official North American Wario Land 4 website. In this story, Mario receives a letter from his childhood playmate Wario, who invites him over to his castle to "catch up on things". Wario is secretly plotting revenge for a series of indignities Mario unknowingly forced him to suffer in childhood. In the road between his house and Wario's castle, Mario encounters several of the bosses from the game, but does not suspect that have been sent to eliminate him. Eventually, he reaches the castle and finds a giant Wario waiting to pummel him. In the fight that ensues, Mario finds that Wario's new size is thanks to a plug on his overalls, which he then pulls off, deflating Wario to his normal size, apparently the same size as Mario. Wario tearfully fears Mario bullying him again, but Mario, realizing this, apologizes. The story ends on them playing cowboys again, with Wario once again vowing to get even.

A year later, immediately following a comic adaptation of Star Fox, another Mario vs. Wario comic ran in the magazine, entitled Mario vs. Wario: The Birthday Bash, a stand-alone sequel that was published in the January 1994 issue of the magazine. Mario and Wario, the latter now retaining his size (slightly taller than Mario) and mean-spirited personality from the games, are invited to Princess Toadstool's birthday party, and they both recall of the Princess' infatuation with a super deformed doll in the likeness of Samus Aran (perhaps foreshadowing the Super Metroid comic adaptation that started in the next issue). Wario enters the toy shop, only to find that a man with "a big black moustache" bought the last Samus doll in stock. Positive the customer was Mario, Wario buys a jack-in-the-box and has it wrapped in the same packaging. At the party, Wario attempts to create a diversion but ends up helping set up the party; he finally switches the gifts when Mario goes to greet some guests. When Wario presents Mario's gift to the Princess, however, she opens it up to find it is a jack-in-the-box, leaving her frightened. When Mario, who suspects Wario bought the Samus doll, presents Wario's gift, Wario insists it is his and that Mario bought the jack-in-the-box in identical packaging to deceive him, but it is also a jack-in-the-box. Mario and Wario break out in a fist fight until they realize neither of them ever had the doll. Luigi reveals he bought it for the Princess, leaving Wario brooding over his misunderstanding and Mario wondering how much his mustache looks like Luigi's. This second Mario vs. Wario comic is the only installment of Super Mario Adventures that has never been reprinted.

== See also ==
- Other Mario media
