= Kibakichi =

- Directed by: Tomoo Haraguchi
- Screenplay by: Mugi Kamio
- Produced by: Junichiro Mizuno
- Starring: Ryuji Harada
- Production company: GP Museum
- Release date: 2003 (San Sebastián)
- Running time: 96 minutes
- Country: Japan

Kibakichi (牙吉 Bakko Yokaiden Kibakichi) a 2003 Japanese jidaigeki film directed by Tomoo Haraguchi. The film is about a youkai swordsman with the ability to transform himself into a werewolf-like beast at will and feed on human flesh.

A sequel followed the film's release in Japan in the same year.

== Plot ==
In the Edo period of Japan, a wandering swordsman wearing a cloak of skins ends up in a gambling town run by demons, namely Boss Ounizo, that hide in the guise of humans to interact with other people. Demons (Youkai)in this era, like the Fair Folk, were once equal citizens, and lived beside mankind peacefully; but with advances in technology, especially warfare (with the explosive introduction of the Gatling gun), humans have forgotten their tolerance and nearly wiped their counterparts out of existence. Kibakichi is forced to stay, but uncovers the gambling house's secret: the demons, tired of living in fear, have taken the biggest gamble of all - a pact with the current ruling human government to fortify a sanctum where they would be free from tyranny. Kibakichi himself remembers that, though not all humans are bad, not all can be trusted. Being the likely sole survivor of his exterminated clan (a native tribe of Wolves that once put their faith in humanity, to catastrophic consequences), he is a cautious and un-trusting warrior, though quickly comes to see that not all is as it seems. The shady business acts more like a close and happy family of those without homes, like him, that welcome him warmly; even Ounizo has adopted a human girl, Kikyo, as his daughter, and all do their best to live.

== Production ==
Kibakichi was a follow-up to director's Tomo'o Haraguchi's Sakuya (2000). Kibakichi is a yokai, a type of creature from Japanese folklore that appear in various shapes and sizes. During this period of Japanese cinema, many films were adaptations of manga and while a Kibakichi manga existed, the film's director only took the name Kibakichi and the idea of a masterless samurai who can transform into a werewolf-like creature. Among the film's cast was Ryuji Harada, a popular Japanese television actor. Haraguchi stated that he wanted the film to belong to the jidaigeki (Japanese historical) genre, and to feature a lot of sword fighting. As there are not many actors who were good at tachimawari (stage fighting), Harada had the advantage of some experience by having done historical television dramas before.

== Release ==
Kibakichi was shown at the San Sebastian Horror and Fantasy Film Festival in 2003 in Spain. Critic and film historian Roberto Curti commented on the premiere of the film, comparing it to Ju-On: The Grudge's which also was shown at the festival, noting that both films were perceived as "major disappointments" and that the audience yelled jokes at the characters and among themselves.

== Reception ==
In his book The Werewolf Filmography, Bryan Senn described the film as a "mix of arty cinematography (slow-motion shots of swaying trees; endless close-ups of the brooding protagonist) and nightmarish exploitation (a basement room full of skulls and a half-eaten corpses; various severed limbs and arterial blood spray), Kibakichi never fully gels." Senn noted that the creatures in the film "look more goofy than terrifying" and concluded that "the movie's (non)werewolf energetically attacks and leaps (almost flying at times) with supernatural vigor at the over-the-top, no-holds-barred climax. Here the beast-man single-handedly decimates the band of gun-wielding human villains in a bloody and energized display of wirework and stylized violence that helps overcome the film's occasional tedium and disjointed feel."

== Sequel ==
A sequel Kibakichi 2 was also released in Japan three months after the first film's release in Japan. Haraguchi was involved in the planning of the sequel but could not direct it as he could not fit it into his schedule. Kibakichi was released on DVD by MTI on its sub-label Saiko on June 28, 2005.
