= List of American Dad! episodes =

American Dad! is an American adult animated sitcom created by Seth MacFarlane, Mike Barker, and Matt Weitzman for the Fox Broadcasting Company and TBS. Set in the fictional town of Langley Falls, Virginia, the series centers on the eccentric Smith family. The Smith family consists of title character Stan, Francine, Hayley, Steve, Roger (an alien whom Stan has rescued from government capture and harbors in the family's attic), Jeff Fischer (Hayley's boyfriend, now husband), Klaus (the family's pet who is really an East German man trapped by the CIA in a fish's body) and Rogu (Roger's son who was formerly a tumor). The series' 11th season was its final season to air on Fox; the show moved to the cable network TBS beginning with the 12th season, and would continue airing new episodes on the network until the end of its 21st season.

On December 16, 2021, the series was renewed for its 20th and 21st seasons. The 20th season premiered on March 27, 2023. The 21st season premiered on October 28, 2024. On March 21, 2025, it was announced that the show would no longer air new episodes on TBS once the current season concluded on March 24, 2025. The show would eventually return to its original network, Fox and has been renewed for its 22nd, 23rd, 24th, and 25th seasons. As of September 13, 2026, 401 episodes of American Dad! have aired, currently in its 22nd season. The show left TBS after wrapping up its 21st season. After airing on TBS for over 10 years, the show returned to Fox for its 22nd season on February 22, 2026.

== Series overview ==
Season	Episodes	Originally released		
Season	Episodes	First released	Last released	Network
1	7	February 6, 2005	June 19, 2005	Fox
2	16	September 11, 2005	May 14, 2006	Fox
3	19	September 10, 2006	May 20, 2007	Fox
4	16	September 30, 2007	May 18, 2008	Fox
5	20	September 28, 2008	May 17, 2009	Fox
6	18	September 27, 2009	May 16, 2010	Fox
7	19	October 3, 2010	May 22, 2011	Fox
8	18	September 25, 2011	May 13, 2012	Fox
9	19	September 30, 2012	May 12, 2013	Fox
10	20	September 29, 2013	May 18, 2014	Fox
11	3	September 14, 2014	September 21, 2014	Fox
12	15	October 20, 2014	June 1, 2015	TBS
13	22	January 25, 2016	June 27, 2016	TBS
14	22	November 7, 2016	September 11, 2017	TBS
15	22	December 25, 2017	April 8, 2019	TBS
16	20	April 15, 2019	August 26, 2019	TBS
17	24	April 13, 2020	December 21, 2020	TBS
18	22	April 19, 2021	October 25, 2021	TBS
19	22	January 24, 2022	December 19, 2022	TBS
20	22	March 27, 2023	December 18, 2023	TBS
21	22	October 28, 2024	March 24, 2025	TBS
22	13	February 22, 2026	September 13, 2026	Fox

== Episodes ==
=== Season 1 (2005) ===
No. overall	No. in season	Title	Directed by	Written by	Original release date	Prod. code	U.S. viewers (millions)
1	1	"Pilot"	Ron Hughart	Seth MacFarlane, Mike Barker & Matt Weitzman	February 6, 2005	1AJN01	15.15
2	2	"Threat Levels"	Brent Woods	David Zuckerman	May 1, 2005	1AJN02	9.32
3	3	"Stan Knows Best"	Pam Cooke	Mike Barker & Matt Weitzman	May 8, 2005	1AJN03	8.28
4	4	"Francine's Flashback"	Caleb Meurer & Brent Woods	Rick Wiener & Kenny Schwartz	May 15, 2005	1AJN05	7.84
5	5	"Roger Codger"	Albert Calleros	Dan Vebber	June 5, 2005	1AJN04	6.09
6	6	"Homeland Insecurity"	Rodney Clouden	Neal Boushell & Sam O'Neal	June 12, 2005	1AJN06	6.85
7	7	"Deacon Stan, Jesus Man"	John Aoshima	Nahnatchka Khan	June 19, 2005	1AJN07	6.55

=== Season 2 (2005–06) ===
No. overall	No. in season	Title	Directed by	Written by	Original release date	Prod. code	U.S. viewers (millions)
8	1	"Bullocks to Stan"	Brent Woods	Alison McDonald	September 11, 2005	1AJN09	7.83
9	2	"A Smith in the Hand"	Pam Cooke	David Hemingson	September 18, 2005	1AJN10	8.60
10	3	"All About Steve"	Mike Kim	Chris McKenna & Matt McKenna	September 25, 2005	1AJN08	7.63
11	4	"Con Heir"	Albert Calleros	Steve Hely	October 2, 2005	1AJN11	7.43
12	5	"Stan of Arabia: Part 1"	Rodney Clouden	Nahnatchka Khan	November 6, 2005	1AJN12	7.30
13	6	"Stan of Arabia: Part 2"	Anthony Lioi	Carter Bays & Craig Thomas	November 13, 2005	1AJN13	7.74
14	7	"Stannie Get Your Gun"	John Aoshima	Brian Boyle	November 20, 2005	1AJN14	8.19
15	8	"Star Trek"	Mike Kim	Chris McKenna & Matt McKenna	November 27, 2005	1AJN15	8.80
16	9	"Not Particularly Desperate Housewives"	Brent Woods	Dan Vebber	December 18, 2005	1AJN16	7.84
17	10	"Rough Trade"	Pam Cooke	David Zuckerman	January 8, 2006	1AJN17	6.89
18	11	"Finances with Wolves"	Albert Calleros	Neal Boushell & Sam O'Neal	January 29, 2006	1AJN18	8.23
19	12	"It's Good to Be the Queen"	Rodney Clouden	Alison McDonald	February 26, 2006	1AJN19	7.70
20	13	"Roger 'n' Me"	Anthony Lioi	Rick Wiener & Kenny Schwartz	April 23, 2006	2AJN01	7.34
21	14	"Helping Handis"	Caleb Meurer	Nahnatchka Khan	April 30, 2006	2AJN02	6.51
22	15	"With Friends Like Steve's"	John Aoshima	Erik Durbin	May 7, 2006	2AJN03	6.60
23	16	"Tears of a Clooney"	Brent Woods	Chris McKenna & Matt McKenna	May 14, 2006	2AJN04	6.86

=== Season 3 (2006–07) ===
No. overall	No. in season	Title	Directed by	Written by	Original release date	Prod. code	U.S. viewers (millions)
24	1	"Camp Refoogee"	Albert Calleros	Josh Bycel & Jonathan Fener	September 10, 2006	2AJN06	8.93
25	2	"The American Dad After School Special"	Pam Cooke	Dan Vebber	September 17, 2006	2AJN05	7.71
26	3	"Failure Is Not a Factory-Installed Option"	Rodney Clouden	Etan Cohen	September 24, 2006	2AJN07	8.36
27	4	"Lincoln Lover"	Brent Woods	Rick Wiener, Kenny Schwartz & Nahnatchka Khan	November 5, 2006	2AJN11	7.71
28	5	"Dungeons and Wagons"	Kurt Dumas & Anthony Lioi	Michael Shipley & Jim Bernstein	November 12, 2006	2AJN08	8.48
29	6	"Iced, Iced Babies"	Caleb Meurer	Steve Hely	November 19, 2006	2AJN09	8.24
30	7	"Of Ice and Men"	John Aoshima	Brian Boyle	November 26, 2006	2AJN10	8.76
31	8	"Irregarding Steve"	Pam Cooke	Chris McKenna & Matt McKenna	December 10, 2006	2AJN12	7.11
32	9	"The Best Christmas Story Never Told"	Albert Calleros	Brian Boyle	December 17, 2006	2AJN14	7.40
33	10	"Bush Comes to Dinner"	Mike Kim	Mike Barker & Matt Weitzman	January 7, 2007	2AJN13	9.12
34	11	"American Dream Factory"	Rodney Clouden	Nahnatchka Khan	January 28, 2007	2AJN16	7.49
35	12	"A.T. The Abusive Terrestrial"	Joe Daniello	Dan Vebber	February 11, 2007	2AJN17	6.60
36	13	"Black Mystery Month"	Brent Woods	Laura McCreary	February 18, 2007	2AJN20	7.06
37	14	"An Apocalypse to Remember"	John Aoshima	Erik Durbin	March 25, 2007	2AJN19	6.64
38	15	"Four Little Words"	Caleb Meurer	David Zuckerman	April 1, 2007	2AJN18	5.94
39	16	"When a Stan Loves a Woman"	Rodney Clouden	Rick Wiener & Kenny Schwartz	April 29, 2007	2AJN23	6.71
40	17	"I Can't Stan You"	Pam Cooke	Michael Shipley & Jim Bernstein	May 6, 2007	2AJN15	6.31
41	18	"The Magnificent Steven"	Mike Kim	Steve Hely	May 13, 2007	2AJN21	5.67
42	19	"Joint Custody"	Joe Daniello	Keith Heisler	May 20, 2007	2AJN24	7.62

=== Season 4 (2007–08) ===
No. overall	No. in season	Title	Directed by	Written by	Original release date	Prod. code	U.S. viewers (millions)
43	1	"The Vacation Goo"	Albert Calleros	Josh Bycel & Jonathan Fener	September 30, 2007	2AJN22	6.07
44	2	"Meter Made"	Bob Bowen	Dan Vebber	October 7, 2007	3AJN01	6.29
45	3	"Dope & Faith"	Caleb Meurer	Michael Shipley	October 14, 2007	3AJN02	6.20
46	4	"Big Trouble in Little Langley"	John Aoshima	Rick Wiener & Kenny Schwartz	November 4, 2007	3AJN03	7.08
47	5	"Haylias"	Brent Woods	David Zuckerman	November 11, 2007	3AJN04	7.77
48	6	"The 42-Year-Old Virgin"	Pam Cooke	Nahnatchka Khan	November 18, 2007	3AJN05	8.12
49	7	"Surro-Gate"	Tim Parsons	Erik Durbin	December 2, 2007	3AJN07	6.48
50	8	"The Most Adequate Christmas Ever"	John Aoshima	Jim Bernstein	December 16, 2007	3AJN12	7.16
51	9	"Frannie 911"	Joe Daniello	Brian Boyle	January 6, 2008	3AJN06	5.19
52	10	"Tearjerker"	Albert Calleros	Jonathan Fener	January 13, 2008	3AJN08	8.62
53	11	"Oedipal Panties"	Rodney Clouden	David Hemingson	January 27, 2008	3AJN09	6.16
54	12	"Widowmaker"	Bob Bowen	Keith Heisler	February 17, 2008	3AJN10	5.35
55	13	"Red October Sky"	Caleb Meurer	Steve Hely	April 27, 2008	3AJN11	6.76
56	14	"Office Spaceman"	Brent Woods	Laura McCreary	May 4, 2008	3AJN13	6.28
57	15	"Stanny Slickers II: The Legend of Ollie's Gold"	Pam Cooke	Erik Sommers	May 11, 2008	3AJN14	5.67
58	16	"Spring Breakup"	Albert Calleros	Nahnatchka Khan	May 18, 2008	3AJN17	5.64

=== Season 5 (2008–09) ===
No. overall	No. in season	Title	Directed by	Written by	Original release date	Prod. code	U.S. viewers (millions)
59	1	"1600 Candles"	Caleb Meurer	Rick Wiener & Kenny Schwartz	September 28, 2008	3AJN20	6.89
60	2	"The One That Got Away"	Tim Parsons	Chris McKenna & Matt McKenna	October 5, 2008	3AJN16	6.86
61	3	"One Little Word"	Rodney Clouden	David Zuckerman	October 19, 2008	3AJN18	6.63
62	4	"Choosy Wives Choose Smith"	Joe Daniello	Matt Fusfeld & Alex Cuthbertson	November 2, 2008	3AJN15	7.09
63	5	"Escape from Pearl Bailey"	Bob Bowen	Dan Vebber	November 9, 2008	3AJN19	6.54
64	6	"Pulling Double Booty"	John Aoshima	Brian Boyle	November 16, 2008	3AJN21	6.76
65	7	"Phantom of the Telethon"	Brent Woods	Mike Barker & Matt Weitzman	November 30, 2008	3AJN22	5.56
66	8	"Chimdale"	Pam Cooke & Jansen Yee	Keith Heisler	January 25, 2009	4AJN01	5.72
67	9	"Stan Time"	Joe Daniello	Jonathan Fener	February 8, 2009	4AJN02	4.60
68	10	"Family Affair"	Tim Parsons	Erik Durbin	February 15, 2009	4AJN03	5.88
69	11	"Live and Let Fry"	Albert Calleros	Laura McCreary	March 1, 2009	4AJN04	5.66
70	12	"Roy Rogers McFreely"	Bob Bowen	Brian Boyle	March 8, 2009	4AJN05	5.37
71	13	"Jack's Back"	Rodney Clouden	David Zuckerman	March 15, 2009	4AJN07	5.88
72	14	"Bar Mitzvah Hustle"	Brent Woods	Chris McKenna & Matt McKenna	March 22, 2009	4AJN06	5.84
73	15	"Wife Insurance"	John Aoshima	Erik Sommers	March 29, 2009	4AJN08	6.02
74	16	"Delorean Story-an"	Joe Daniello	Matt Fusfeld & Alex Cuthbertson	April 19, 2009	4AJN09	5.72
75	17	"Every Which Way But Lose"	Pam Cooke & Jansen Yee	Steve Hely	April 26, 2009	4AJN10	5.13
76	18	"Weiner of Our Discontent"	Tim Parsons	Laura McCreary	May 3, 2009	4AJN11	5.35
77	19	"Daddy Queerest"	Albert Calleros	Nahnatchka Khan	May 10, 2009	4AJN12	4.88
78	20	"Stan's Night Out"	Bob Bowen	Jim Bernstein	May 17, 2009	4AJN13	5.64

=== Season 6 (2009–10) ===
This is the first season of American Dad! to be broadcast in High Definition starting with the 5AJNxx production line (Episode 10) in midseason 2010.

No. overall	No. in season	Title	Directed by	Written by	Original release date	Prod. code	U.S. viewers (millions)
79	1	"In Country...Club"	Albert Calleros & Josue Cervantes	Judah Miller & Murray Miller	September 27, 2009	4AJN20	7.14
80	2	"Moon Over Isla Island"	Rodney Clouden	Jonathan Fener	October 4, 2009	4AJN15	7.14
81	3	"Home Adrone"	Brent Woods	Erik Sommers	October 11, 2009	4AJN14	6.75
82	4	"Brains, Brains and Automobiles"	Pam Cooke & Jansen Yee	Keith Heisler	October 18, 2009	4AJN18	6.25
83	5	"Man in the Moonbounce"	Tim Parsons	Brian Boyle	November 8, 2009	4AJN19	4.08
84	6	"Shallow Vows"	John Aoshima	Rick Wiener & Kenny Schwartz	November 15, 2009	4AJN16	6.17
85	7	"My Morning Straitjacket"	Chris Bennett	Mike Barker	November 22, 2009	4AJN22	5.60
86	8	"G-String Circus"	Bob Bowen	Erik Durbin	November 29, 2009	4AJN21	6.38
87	9	"Rapture's Delight"	Joe Daniello	Chris McKenna & Matt McKenna	December 13, 2009	4AJN17	6.20
88	10	"Don't Look a Smith Horse in the Mouth"	Rodney Clouden	Matt Fusfeld & Alex Cuthbertson	January 3, 2010	5AJN01	5.90
89	11	"A Jones for a Smith"	John Aoshima & Jansen Yee	Laura McCreary	January 31, 2010	5AJN02	5.06
90	12	"May the Best Stan Win"	Pam Cooke	Murray Miller & Judah Miller	February 14, 2010	5AJN04	5.25
91	13	"The Return of the Bling"	Joe Daniello	Nahnatchka Khan	February 21, 2010	5AJN03	5.66
92	14	"Cops and Roger"	Tim Parsons	Erik Durbin	April 11, 2010	5AJN06	5.13
93	15	"Merlot Down Dirty Shame"	Josue Cervantes	Brian Boyle	April 18, 2010	5AJN08	5.22
94	16	"Bully for Steve"	Rodney Clouden	Matt Fusfeld & Alex Cuthbertson	April 25, 2010	5AJN11	5.33
95	17	"An Incident at Owl Creek"	John Aoshima & Jansen Yee	Alan R. Cohen & Alan Freedland	May 9, 2010	5AJN10	5.84
96	18	"Great Space Roaster"	Joe Daniello	Jonathan Fener	May 16, 2010	5AJN12	5.89

=== Season 7 (2010–11) ===
No. overall	No. in season	Title	Directed by	Written by	Original release date	Prod. code	U.S. viewers (millions)
97	1	"100 A.D."	Tim Parsons	Keith Heisler	October 3, 2010	5AJN14	6.16
98	2	"Son of Stan"	Chris Bennett	Erik Sommers	October 10, 2010	5AJN17	5.36
99	3	"Best Little Horror House in Langley Falls"	John Aoshima & Jansen Yee	Eric Weinberg	November 7, 2010	5AJN19	6.30
100	4	"Stan's Food Restaurant"	Josue Cervantes	Brian Boyle	November 14, 2010	5AJN16	5.38
101	5	"White Rice"	Bob Bowen	Rick Wiener & Kenny Schwartz	November 21, 2010	5AJN15	4.86
102	6	"There Will Be Bad Blood"	Joe Daniello	Murray Miller & Judah Miller	November 28, 2010	5AJN20	6.13
103	7	"The People vs. Martin Sugar"	Pam Cooke	Jonathan Fener	December 5, 2010	5AJN05	5.31
104	8	"For Whom the Sleigh Bell Tolls"	Bob Bowen	Erik Durbin	December 12, 2010	5AJN22	6.22
105	9	"Fart-Break Hotel"	Rodney Clouden	Chris McKenna & Matt McKenna	January 16, 2011	5AJN18	3.54
106	10	"Stanny Boy and Frantastic"	Pam Cooke	Laura McCreary	January 23, 2011	5AJN13	4.81
107	11	"A Piñata Named Desire"	Bob Bowen	Chris McKenna & Matt McKenna	February 13, 2011	5AJN07	3.93
108	12	"You Debt Your Life"	Chris Bennett	Erik Sommers	February 20, 2011	5AJN09	4.25
109	13	"I Am the Walrus"	Tim Parsons	Keith Heisler	March 27, 2011	5AJN21	4.99
110	14	"School Lies"	Rodney Clouden	Brian Boyle	April 3, 2011	6AJN03	3.59
111	15	"License to Till"	John Aoshima & Jansen Yee	Matt Fusfeld & Alex Cuthbertson	April 10, 2011	6AJN04	3.35
112	16	"Jenny Fromdabloc"	Bob Bowen	Laura McCreary	April 17, 2011	6AJN08	4.74
113	17	"Home Wrecker"	Joe Daniello	Alan R. Cohen & Alan Freedland	May 8, 2011	6AJN05	3.29
114	18	"Flirting with Disaster"	Pam Cooke	Keith Heisler	May 15, 2011	6AJN06	3.93
115	19	"Gorillas in the Mist"	Chris Bennett	Erik Durbin	May 22, 2011	6AJN10	3.57

=== Season 8 (2011–12) ===
No. overall	No. in season	Title	Directed by	Written by	Original release date	Prod. code	U.S. viewers (millions)
116	1	"Hot Water"	Chris Bennett	Judah Miller & Murray Miller	September 25, 2011	6AJN18	5.83
117	2	"Hurricane!"	Tim Parsons	Erik Sommers	October 2, 2011	6AJN07	5.80
118	3	"A Ward Show"	Josue Cervantes	Erik Durbin	November 6, 2011	6AJN01	4.85
119	4	"The Worst Stan"	Rodney Clouden	Nahnatchka Khan	November 13, 2011	6AJN11	4.87
120	5	"Virtual In-Stanity"	Shawn Murray	Jordan Blum & Parker Deay	November 20, 2011	6AJN16	4.82
121	6	"The Scarlett Getter"	Josue Cervantes	Matt Fusfeld & Alex Cuthbertson	November 27, 2011	6AJN09	4.48
122	7	"Season's Beatings"	Joe Daniello	Erik Sommers	December 11, 2011	6AJN21	5.00
123	8	"The Unbrave One"	Joe Daniello	Rick Wiener & Kenny Schwartz	January 8, 2012	6AJN13	4.79
124	9	"Stanny Tendergrass"	Tim Parsons	Keith Heisler	January 29, 2012	6AJN15	4.77
125	10	"Wheels & the Legman and the Case of Grandpa's Key"	Josue Cervantes	Laura McCreary	February 12, 2012	6AJN17	3.59
126	11	"Old Stan in the Mountain"	Pam Cooke & Valerie Fletcher	Jonathan Fener	February 19, 2012	6AJN14	4.43
127	12	"The Wrestler"	Rodney Clouden	Alan R. Cohen & Alan Freedland	March 4, 2012	6AJN19	4.29
128	13	"Dr. Klaustus"	John Aoshima & Jansen Yee	Brian Boyle	March 11, 2012	6AJN12	4.62
129	14	"Stan's Best Friend"	John Aoshima & Jansen Yee	Jonathan Fener	March 18, 2012	6AJN20	4.61
130	15	"Less Money, Mo' Problems"	Chris Bennett	Murray Miller & Judah Miller	March 25, 2012	6AJN02	4.28
131	16	"The Kidney Stays in the Picture"	Pam Cooke & Valerie Fletcher	Rick Wiener & Kenny Schwartz	April 1, 2012	6AJN22	4.18
132	17	"Ricky Spanish"	Shawn Murray	Erik Sommers	May 6, 2012	7AJN02	4.82
133	18	"Toy Whorey"	Tim Parsons & Jennifer Graves	Matt Fusfeld & Alex Cuthbertson	May 13, 2012	7AJN01	4.13

=== Season 9 (2012–13) ===
No. overall	No. in season	Title	Directed by	Written by	Original release date	Prod. code	U.S. viewers (millions)
134	1	"Love, AD Style"	Josue Cervantes	Erik Durbin	September 30, 2012	7AJN03	5.25
135	2	"Killer Vacation"	Rodney Clouden	Rick Wiener & Kenny Schwartz	October 7, 2012	7AJN05	5.18
136	3	"Can I Be Frank with You?"	Pam Cooke & Valerie Fletcher	Judah Miller	November 4, 2012 (Note: This episode was originally scheduled to air on October 21, 2012, but was preempted as a result of a rainout of NLCS Game 6)	7AJN08	3.99
137	4	"American Stepdad"	Shawn Murray	Jordan Blum & Parker Deay	November 18, 2012	7AJN10	4.21
138	5	"Why Can't We Be Friends?"	Jansen Yee	Jonathan Fener	December 2, 2012	7AJN06	4.25
139	6	"Adventures in Hayleysitting"	Tim Parsons & Jennifer Graves	Matt Fusfeld & Alex Cuthbertson	December 9, 2012	7AJN09	4.67
140	7	"National Treasure 4: Baby Franny: She's Doing Well: The Hole Story"	Chris Bennett	Murray Miller	December 23, 2012	7AJN04	4.21
141	8	"Finger Lenting Good"	Joe Daniello	Laura McCreary	January 6, 2013	7AJN07	5.65
142	9	"The Adventures of Twill Ongenbone and His Boy Jabari"	Josue Cervantes	Brian Boyle	January 13, 2013	7AJN11	4.82
143	10	"Blood Crieth Unto Heaven"	Joe Daniello	Brian Boyle	January 27, 2013	7AJN15	4.27
144	11	"Max Jets"	Tim Parsons & Jennifer Graves	Keith Heisler	February 10, 2013	7AJN17	3.88
145	12	"Naked to the Limit, One More Time"	Chris Bennett	Keith Heisler	February 17, 2013	7AJN12	4.15
146	13	"For Black Eyes Only"	Jansen Yee	Jonathan Fener	March 10, 2013	7AJN22	3.27
147	14	"Spelling Bee My Baby"	Rodney Clouden	Lesley Wake Webster	March 24, 2013	7AJN13	4.53
148	15	"The Missing Kink"	Pam Cooke & Valerie Fletcher	Jeff Chiang & Eric Ziobrowski	April 14, 2013	7AJN16	4.23
149	16	"The Boring Identity"	Jansen Yee	Erik Sommers	April 21, 2013	7AJN14	3.81
150	17	"The Full Cognitive Redaction of Avery Bullock by the Coward Stan Smith"	Shawn Murray	Erik Durbin	April 28, 2013	7AJN18	4.03
151	18	"Lost in Space"	Chris Bennett	Mike Barker	May 5, 2013	7AJN20	5.00
152	19	"Da Flippity Flop"	Rodney Clouden	Matt Weitzman	May 12, 2013	7AJN21	4.01

=== Season 10 (2013–14) ===
No. overall	No. in season	Title	Directed by	Written by	Original release date	Prod. code	U.S. viewers (millions)
153	1	"Steve & Snot's Test-Tubular Adventure"	Joe Daniello	Jordan Blum & Parker Deay	September 29, 2013	8AJN01	4.32
154	2	"Poltergasm"	Pam Cooke & Valerie Fletcher	Matt McKenna	October 6, 2013	8AJN02	4.47
155	3	"Buck, Wild"	Josue Cervantes	Brett Cawley & Robert Maitia	November 3, 2013	8AJN05	3.75
156	4	"Crotchwalkers"	Tim Parsons & Jennifer Graves	Dan Vebber	November 10, 2013	8AJN03	3.55
157	5	"Kung Pao Turkey"	Rodney Clouden	Erik Richter	November 24, 2013	8AJN07	3.86
158	6	"Independent Movie"	Shawn Murray	Judah Miller	December 1, 2013	8AJN04	3.50
159	7	"Faking Bad"	Jansen Yee	John Unholz	December 8, 2013	8AJN08	4.36
160	8	"Minstrel Krampus"	Josue Cervantes	Murray Miller & Judah Miller	December 15, 2013 (Note: This episode was originally scheduled to air on December 16, 2012 as part of its ninth season, but was pulled from its planned airing as a result of the Sandy Hook Elementary School shooting that occurred two days prior.)	7AJN19	5.00
161	9	"Vision: Impossible"	Pam Cooke & Valerie Fletcher	Ali Waller	January 5, 2014	8AJN10	5.03
162	10	"Familyland"	Joe Daniello	Joe Chandler & Nic Wegener	January 12, 2014	8AJN09	4.47
163	11	"Cock of the Sleepwalk"	Shawn Murray	Brian Boyle	January 26, 2014	8AJN12	3.30
164	12	"Introducing the Naughty Stewardesses"	Josue Cervantes	Judah Miller	March 16, 2014	8AJN13	2.71
165	13	"I Ain't No Holodeck Boy"	Jansen Yee	Matt McKenna	March 23, 2014	8AJN16	2.70
166	14	"Stan Goes on the Pill"	Chris Bennett	Brett Cawley & Robert Maitia	March 30, 2014	8AJN14	2.79
167	15	"Honey, I'm Homeland"	Tim Parsons & Jennifer Graves	Dan Vebber	April 6, 2014	8AJN11	2.68
168	16	"She Swill Survive"	Chris Bennett	Rick Singer	April 13, 2014	8AJN06	2.36
169	17	"Rubberneckers"	Rodney Clouden	Joe Chandler & Nic Wegener	April 27, 2014	8AJN15	2.40
170	18	"Permanent Record Wrecker"	Tim Parsons & Jennifer Graves	Brian Boyle	May 4, 2014	8AJN19	2.51
171	19	"News Glance with Genevieve Vavance"	Shawn Murray	Ali Waller	May 11, 2014	8AJN20	2.40
172	20	"The Longest Distance Relationship"	Pam Cooke & Valerie Fletcher	Jordan Blum & Parker Deay	May 18, 2014	8AJN18	2.36

=== Season 11 (2014) ===
No. overall	No. in season	Title	Directed by	Written by	Original release date	Prod. code	U.S. viewers (millions)
173	1	"Roger Passes the Bar"	Josue Cervantes	Charles Suozzi	September 14, 2014	8AJN21	2.62
174	2	"A Boy Named Michael"	Joe Daniello	Erik Richter	September 14, 2014	8AJN17	2.66
175	3	"Blagsnarst, a Love Story"	Chris Bennett	Wes Lukey	September 21, 2014	8AJN22	3.03

=== Season 12 (2014–15) ===
No. overall	No. in season	Title	Directed by	Written by	Original release date	Prod. code	U.S. viewers (millions)
176	1	"Blonde Ambition"	Rodney Clouden	Story by : Evan Sandman & Carlo Hart; Teleplay by : Mike Barker, (Note: Credited as Wayne Dublin) Carlo Hart & Evan Sandman	October 20, 2014	9AJN01	1.09
177	2	"CIAPOW"	Jansen Yee	Joe Chandler & Nic Wegener	October 27, 2014	9AJN02	1.15
178	3	"Scents and Sensei-bility"	Tim Parsons & Jennifer Graves	Mike Barker, Carlo Hart & Evan Sandman	November 3, 2014	9AJN05	1.22
179	4	"Big Stan on Campus"	Pam Cooke & Valerie Fletcher	Brian Boyle	November 10, 2014	9AJN04	1.16
180	5	"Now and Gwen"	Chris Bennett	Rachael Bogert & Emily Wood	November 17, 2014	9AJN06	1.31
181	6	"Dreaming of a White Porsche Christmas"	Shawn Murray	Brian Boyle	December 1, 2014	9AJN08	1.01
182	7	"LGBSteve"	Joe Daniello	Erik Richter	February 23, 2015	9AJN11	1.10
183	8	"Morning Mimosa"	Josue Cervantes	Ali Waller	March 2, 2015	9AJN07	1.14
184	9	"My Affair Lady"	Joe Daniello	Teresa Hsiao	March 9, 2015	9AJN03	1.14
185	10	"A Star Is Reborn"	Rodney Clouden	Brett Cawley & Robert Maitia	March 16, 2015	9AJN09	1.10
186	11	"Manhattan Magical Murder Mystery Tour"	Jansen Yee	Kirk J. Rudell	March 23, 2015	9AJN10	1.02
187	12	"The Shrink"	Pam Cooke & Valerie Fletcher	Brett Cawley & Robert Maitia	March 30, 2015	9AJN12	1.11
188	13	"Holy Shit, Jeff's Back!"	Tim Parsons & Jennifer Graves	Joe Chandler & Nic Wegener	May 18, 2015	9AJN13	1.17
189	14	"American Fung"	Chris Bennett	Greg Cohen	May 25, 2015	9AJN14	0.91
190	15	"Seizures Suit Stanny"	Josue Cervantes	Erik Durbin	June 1, 2015	9AJN15	1.11

=== Season 13 (2016) ===
No. overall	No. in season	Title	Directed by	Written by	Original release date	Prod. code	U.S. viewers (millions)
191	1	"Roots"	Shawn Murray	Brett Cawley & Robert Maitia	January 25, 2016	AAJN01	1.04
192	2	"The Life Aquatic with Steve Smith"	Rodney Clouden	Kirk J. Rudell	February 1, 2016	AAJN02	0.95
193	3	"Hayley Smith, Seal Team Six"	Jansen Yee	Teresa Hsiao	February 8, 2016	AAJN03	1.00
194	4	"N.S.A. (No Snoops Allowed)"	Joe Daniello	Steve Hely	February 15, 2016	AAJN04	1.07
195	5	"Stan Smith as Keanu Reeves as Stanny Utah in Point Breakers"	Pam Cooke & Valerie Fletcher	Joe Chandler & Nic Wegener	February 22, 2016	AAJN05	1.05
196	6	"Kiss Kiss Cam Cam"	Chris Bennett	Jordan Blum & Parker Deay	February 29, 2016	AAJN07	1.03
197	7	"The Devil Wears a Lapel Pin"	Josue Cervantes	Zack Rosenblatt	March 7, 2016	AAJN08	1.14
198	8	"Stan-Dan Deliver"	Shawn Murray	Rachael Bogert & Emily Wood	March 14, 2016	AAJN09	1.01
199	9	"Anchorfran"	Rodney Clouden	Jeff Kauffmann	March 21, 2016	AAJN11	0.96
200	10	"The Two Hundred"	Jansen Yee	Brett Cawley & Robert Maitia	March 28, 2016	AAJN10	1.08
201	11	"The Unincludeds"	Tim Parsons & Jennifer Graves	Ali Waller	April 11, 2016	AAJN06	1.05
202	12	"The Dentist's Wife"	Joe Daniello	Charles Suozzi	April 18, 2016	AAJN12	1.08
203	13	"Widow's Pique"	Pam Cooke & Valerie Fletcher	Sam Brenner	April 25, 2016	AAJN13	1.05
204	14	"The Nova Centauris-burgh Board of Tourism Presents: American Dad"	Tim Parsons & Jennifer Graves	Jordan Blum & Parker Deay	May 2, 2016	AAJN14	0.82
205	15	"Daesong Heavy Industries"	Chris Bennett	Greg Cohen	May 9, 2016	AAJN15	0.91
206	16	"Daesong Heavy Industries II: Return to Innocence"	Josue Cervantes	Zack Rosenblatt	May 16, 2016	AAJN16	0.93
207	17	"Criss-Cross Applesauce: The Ballad of Billy Jesusworth"	Shawn Murray	Joe Chandler & Nic Wegener	May 23, 2016	AAJN17	0.95
208	18	"Mine Struggle"	Rodney Clouden	Kirk J. Rudell	May 30, 2016	AAJN18	1.15
209	19	"Garfield and Friends"	Jansen Yee	Teresa Hsiao	June 6, 2016	AAJN19	0.87
210	20	"Gift Me Liberty"	Joe Daniello	Charles Suozzi	June 13, 2016	AAJN20	1.02
211	21	"Next of Pin"	Pam Cooke & Valerie Fletcher	Jeff Kauffmann	June 20, 2016	AAJN21	0.92
212	22	"Standard Deviation"	Tim Parsons & Jennifer Graves	Brian Boyle	June 27, 2016	AAJN22	0.98

=== Season 14 (2016–17) ===
No. overall	No. in season	Title	Directed by	Written by	Original release date	Prod. code	U.S. viewers (millions)
213	1	"Father's Daze"	Chris Bennett	Jordan Blum & Parker Deay	November 7, 2016	BAJN01	1.00
214	2	"Fight and Flight"	Josue Cervantes	Jeff Kauffmann	November 14, 2016	BAJN02	0.97
215	3	"The Enlightenment of Ragi-Baba"	Shawn Murray	Joe Chandler & Nic Wegener	November 21, 2016	BAJN03	1.12
216	4	"Portrait of Francine's Genitals"	Rodney Clouden	Steve Hely	November 28, 2016	BAJN04	1.08
217	5	"Bahama Mama"	Jansen Yee	Zack Rosenblatt	December 5, 2016	BAJN05	1.10
218	6	"Roger's Baby"	Joe Daniello	Teresa Hsiao	December 12, 2016	BAJN06	1.16
219	7	"Ninety North, Zero West"	Pam Cooke & Valerie Fletcher	Brett Cawley & Robert Maitia	December 19, 2016	BAJN07	1.02
220	8	"Whole Slotta Love"	Chris Bennett	Charles Suozzi	April 10, 2017	BAJN09	0.93
221	9	"The Witches of Langley"	Jansen Yee	Joe Chandler & Nic Wegener	April 17, 2017	BAJN13	0.97
222	10	"A Nice Night for a Drive"	Josue Cervantes	Sam Brenner	April 24, 2017	BAJN10	1.01
223	11	"Casino Normale"	Shawn Murray	Tim Saccardo	May 1, 2017	BAJN11	0.94
224	12	"Bazooka Steve"	Rodney Clouden	Joel Hurwitz	May 29, 2017	BAJN12	0.98
225	13	"Camp Campawanda"	Tim Parsons & Jennifer Graves	Kirk J. Rudell	June 5, 2017	BAJN08	0.89
226	14	"Julia Rogerts"	Joe Daniello	Kathryn Borel	June 12, 2017	BAJN14	0.91
227	15	"The Life and Times of Stan Smith"	Pam Cooke & Valerie Fletcher	Jordan Blum & Parker Deay	July 24, 2017	BAJN15	0.85
228	16	"The Bitchin' Race"	Jansen Yee	Kirk J. Rudell	July 31, 2017	BAJN21	0.89
229	17	"Family Plan"	Chris Bennett	Zack Rosenblatt	August 7, 2017	BAJN17	1.04
230	18	"The Long Bomb"	Josue Cervantes	Brett Cawley & Robert Maitia	August 14, 2017	BAJN18	0.93
231	19	"Kloger"	Shawn Murray	Teresa Hsiao	August 21, 2017	BAJN19	0.88
232	20	"Garbage Stan"	Rodney Clouden	Paul Stroud	August 28, 2017	BAJN20	1.00
233	21	"The Talented Mr. Dingleberry"	Tim Parsons & Jennifer Graves	Jeff Kauffmann	September 4, 2017	BAJN16	0.86
234	22	"West to Mexico"	Joe Daniello	Brian Boyle	September 11, 2017	BAJN22	0.86

=== Season 15 (2017–19) ===
No. overall	No. in season	Title	Directed by	Written by	Original release date	Prod. code	U.S. viewers (millions)
235	1	"Santa, Schmanta"	Joe Daniello	Teresa Hsiao	December 25, 2017	CAJN08	0.86
236	2	"Paranoid Frandroid"	Pam Cooke & Valerie Fletcher	Joel Hurwitz	February 12, 2018	CAJN01	0.78
237	3	"The Census of the Lambs"	Tim Parsons & Jennifer Graves	Sam Brenner	February 19, 2018	CAJN02	0.83
238	4	"Shell Game"	Chris Bennett	Brett Cawley & Robert Maitia	February 26, 2018	CAJN03	0.73
239	5	"The Mural of the Story"	Josue Cervantes	Jeff Kauffmann	March 5, 2018	CAJN04	0.99
240	6	"(You Gotta) Strike for Your Right"	Shawn Murray	Tim Saccardo	March 12, 2018	CAJN05	0.80
241	7	"Klaustastrophe.tv"	Rodney Clouden	Kirk J. Rudell	March 19, 2018	CAJN06	0.93
242	8	"Death by Dinner Party"	Jansen Yee	Joe Chandler & Nic Wegener	March 26, 2018	CAJN07	0.97
243	9	"The Never-Ending Stories"	Pam Cooke & Valerie Fletcher	Parker Deay & Jordan Blum	April 9, 2018	CAJN09	0.92
244	10	"Railroaded"	Tim Parsons & Jennifer Graves	Zack Rosenblatt	April 16, 2018	CAJN10	0.80
245	11	"My Purity Ball and Chain"	Chris Bennett	Charles Suozzi	April 23, 2018	CAJN11	0.87
246	12	"OreTron Trail"	Josue Cervantes	Paul Stroud	April 30, 2018	CAJN12	0.83
247	13	"Mean Francine"	Shawn Murray	Nicole Shabtai	May 7, 2018	CAJN13	0.92
248	14	"One-Woman Swole"	Rodney Clouden	Sasha Stroman	February 11, 2019	CAJN14	0.75
249	15	"Flavortown"	Jansen Yee	Greg Cohen	February 18, 2019	CAJN15	0.78
250	16	"Persona Assistant"	Joe Daniello	Jeff Kauffmann	February 25, 2019	CAJN16	0.96
251	17	"The Legend of Old Ulysses"	Pam Cooke & Valerie Fletcher	Zack Rosenblatt	March 4, 2019	CAJN17	0.79
252	18	"Twinanigans"	Tim Parsons & Jennifer Graves	Jordan Blum & Parker Deay	March 11, 2019	CAJN18	0.77
253	19	"Top of the Steve"	Chris Bennett	Joe Chandler & Nic Wegener	March 18, 2019	CAJN19	0.70
254	20	"Funnyish Games"	Josue Cervantes	Kirk J. Rudell	March 25, 2019	CAJN20	0.85
255	21	"Fleabiscuit"	Shawn Murray	Teresa Hsiao	April 1, 2019	CAJN21	0.74
256	22	"The Future Is Borax"	Rodney Clouden	Brett Cawley & Robert Maitia	April 8, 2019	CAJN22	0.75

=== Season 16 (2019) ===
No. overall	No. in season	Title	Directed by	Written by	Original release date	Prod. code	U.S. viewers (millions)
257	1	"Fantasy Baseball"	Jansen Yee	Tim Saccardo	April 15, 2019	DAJN01	0.77
258	2	"I Am the Jeans: The Gina Lavetti Story"	Joe Daniello	Nicole Shabtai	April 22, 2019	DAJN02	0.70
259	3	"Stan & Francine & Connie & Ted"	Pam Cooke & Valerie Fletcher	Jeff Kauffmann	April 29, 2019	DAJN03	0.82
260	4	"Rabbit Ears"	Tim Parsons & Jennifer Graves	Brett Cawley & Robert Maitia	May 6, 2019	DAJN04	0.82
261	5	"Jeff and the Dank Ass Weed Factory"	Chris Bennett	Joe Chandler & Nic Wegener	May 13, 2019	DAJN05	0.82
262	6	"Lost Boys"	Josue Cervantes	Joel Hurwitz	May 20, 2019	DAJN06	0.75
263	7	"Shark?!"	Shawn Murray	Jordan Blum & Parker Deay	May 27, 2019	DAJN07	0.76
264	8	"The Long March"	Rodney Clouden	Charles Suozzi	June 3, 2019	DAJN08	0.73
265	9	"The Hall Monitor and the Lunch Lady"	Jansen Yee	Zack Rosenblatt	June 10, 2019	DAJN09	0.81
266	10	"Wild Women Do"	Joe Daniello	Marc Carusiello	June 17, 2019	DAJN10	0.79
267	11	"An Irish Goodbye"	Pam Cooke & Valerie Fletcher	Laura Beason	June 24, 2019	DAJN11	0.69
268	12	"Stompe Le Monde"	Tim Parsons & Jennifer Graves	Zack Rosenblatt	July 1, 2019	DAJN12	0.63
269	13	"Mom Sauce"	Chris Bennett	Sasha Stroman	July 8, 2019	DAJN13	0.65
270	14	"Hamerican Dad!"	Josue Cervantes	Sam Brenner	July 15, 2019	DAJN14	0.85
271	15	"Demolition Daddy"	Shawn Murray	Paul Stroud	July 22, 2019	DAJN15	0.76
272	16	"Pride Before the Fail"	Rodney Clouden	Soren Bowie	July 29, 2019	DAJN16	0.69
273	17	"Enter Stanman"	Jansen Yee	Jeff Kauffmann	August 5, 2019	DAJN17	0.76
274	18	"No Weddings and a Funeral"	Joe Daniello	Tim Saccardo	August 12, 2019	DAJN18	0.73
275	19	"Eight Fires"	Pam Cooke & Valerie Fletcher	Brett Cawley & Robert Maitia	August 19, 2019	DAJN19	0.75
276	20	"The Hand That Rocks the Rogu"	Tim Parsons & Jennifer Graves	Jordan Blum & Parker Deay	August 26, 2019	DAJN20	0.68

=== Season 17 (2020) ===
No. overall	No. in season	Title	Directed by	Written by	Original release date	Prod. code	U.S. viewers (millions)
277	1	"100 Years a Solid Fool"	Shawn Murray	Charles Suozzi	April 13, 2020	EAJN01	0.69
278	2 (Note: Labeled by TBS as episode 21 of previous season)	"Downtown"	Chris Bennett	Nic Wegener & Joe Chandler	April 20, 2020	DAJN21	0.68
279	3 (Note: Labeled by TBS as episode 22 of previous season)	"Cheek to Cheek: A Stripper's Story"	Josue Cervantes	Charles Suozzi	April 27, 2020	DAJN22	0.67
280	4	"A Starboy Is Born"	Chris Bennett	Joel Hurwitz & Abel "The Weeknd" Tesfaye	May 4, 2020	EAJN15	0.65
281	5	"Tapped Out"	Rodney Clouden	Nicole Shabtai	May 11, 2020	EAJN02	0.63
282	6	"Brave N00b World"	Jansen Yee	Joel Hurwitz	May 18, 2020	EAJN03	0.60
283	7	"Into the Woods"	Joe Daniello	Sam Brenner	May 25, 2020	EAJN04	0.66
284	8	"One Fish, Two Fish"	Tim Parsons & Jennifer Graves	Tim Saccardo	June 1, 2020	EAJN06	0.64
285	9	"Exquisite Corpses"	Chris Bennett	Brett Cawley & Robert Maitia	June 8, 2020	EAJN07	0.63
286	10	"Trophy Wife, Trophy Life"	Shawn Murray	Sasha Stroman	June 15, 2020	EAJN10	0.60
287	11	"Game Night"	Rodney Clouden	Zack Rosenblatt	June 22, 2020	EAJN09	0.63
288	12	"American Data?"	Jansen Yee	Paul Stroud	June 29, 2020	EAJN11	0.68
289	13	"Salute Your Sllort"	Joe Daniello	Parker Deay	July 6, 2020	EAJN12	0.64
290	14	"Ghost Dad"	Pam Cooke	Soren Bowie	July 13, 2020	EAJN13	0.59
291	15	"Men II Boyz"	Tim Parsons & Jennifer Graves	Alisha Ketry	July 20, 2020	EAJN14	0.61
292	16	"First, Do No Farm"	Josue Cervantes	Jeff Kauffmann	July 27, 2020	EAJN16	0.50
293	17	"Roger Needs Dick"	Pam Cooke & Valerie Fletcher	Joe Chandler & Nic Wegener	August 3, 2020 (Note: This episode was first released on Video On Demand on June 2, 2020, the day after the episode was originally scheduled to air.)	EAJN05	0.64
294	18	"The Old Country"	Shawn Murray	Tim Saccardo	August 10, 2020	EAJN17	0.51
295	19	"Businessly Brunette"	Rodney Clouden	Zack Rosenblatt	August 17, 2020	EAJN18	0.52
296	20	"The Chilly Thrillies"	Jansen Yee	Laura Beason	August 24, 2020	EAJN19	0.61
297	21	"Dammmm, Stan!"	Joe Daniello	Parker Deay	August 31, 2020	EAJN20	0.48
298	22	"The Last Ride of the Dodge City Rambler"	Pam Cooke	Charles Suozzi	September 7, 2020	EAJN21	0.59
299	23	"300"	Tim Parsons & Jennifer Graves	Joe Chandler & Nic Wegener	September 14, 2020	EAJN22	0.57
300	24	"Yule. Tide. Repeat."	Josue Cervantes	Jeff Kauffmann	December 21, 2020	EAJN08	0.55

=== Season 18 (2021) ===
No. overall	No. in season	Title	Directed by	Written by	Original release date	Prod. code	U.S. viewers (millions)
301	1	"Who Smarted?"	Chris Bennett	Jeff Kauffmann	April 19, 2021	FAJN01	0.56
302	2	"Russian Doll"	Josue Cervantes	Zack Rosenblatt	April 26, 2021	FAJN02	0.60
303	3	"Stan Moves to Chicago"	Shawn Murray	Nic Wegener	May 3, 2021	FAJN03	0.62
304	4	"Shakedown Steve"	Rodney Clouden	Tim Saccardo	May 10, 2021	FAJN04	0.56
305	5	"Klaus and Rogu in "Thank God for Loose Rocks": An American Dad! Adventure"	Jansen Yee	Joe Chandler	May 17, 2021	FAJN05	0.46
306	6	"The Wondercabinet"	Joe Daniello	Brett Cawley & Robert Maitia	May 24, 2021	FAJN06	0.48
307	7	"Little Bonnie Ramirez"	Jennifer Graves	Parker Deay	May 31, 2021	FAJN07	0.46
308	8	"Dancin' A-With My Cell"	Tim Parsons	Charles Suozzi	June 7, 2021	FAJN08	0.60
309	9	"Mused and Abused"	Chris Bennett	Sam Brenner	June 14, 2021	FAJN09	0.55
310	10	"Henderson"	Shawn Murray	Joel Hurwitz	June 21, 2021	FAJN11	0.63
311	11	"Hot Scoomp"	John O'Day	Nicole Shabtai	June 28, 2021	FAJN12	0.52
312	12	"Lumberjerk"	Joe Daniello	Paul Stroud	July 5, 2021	FAJN14	0.60
313	13	"Stan & Francine & Stan & Francine & Radika"	Jennifer Graves	Steve Hely	July 12, 2021	FAJN15	0.60
314	14	"Flush After Reading"	Tim Parsons	Laura Beason	July 19, 2021	FAJN16	0.51
315	15	"Comb Over: A Hair Piece"	Chris Bennett	Brett Cawley & Robert Maitia	July 26, 2021	FAJN17	0.55
316	16	"Plot Heavy"	Jansen Yee	Soren Bowie	August 2, 2021 (Note: This episode was first released on Video On Demand on July 6, 2021, the day after the episode was originally scheduled to air.)	FAJN13	0.42
317	17	"The Sinister Fate!!"	Josue Cervantes	Jeff Kauffmann	August 9, 2021	FAJN18	0.50
318	18	"Dr. Sunderson's SunSuckers"	Shawn Murray	Nic Wegener	August 16, 2021	FAJN19	0.59
319	19	"Family Time"	John O'Day	Zack Rosenblatt	August 23, 2021	FAJN20	0.56
320	20	"Cry Baby"	Jansen Yee	Joe Chandler	August 30, 2021	FAJN21	0.52
321	21	"Crystal Clear"	Joe Daniello	Parker Deay	September 6, 2021	FAJN22	0.46
322	22	"Steve's Franken Out"	Josue Cervantes	Alisha Ketry	October 25, 2021	FAJN10	0.37

=== Season 19 (2022) ===
No. overall	No. in season	Title	Directed by	Written by	Original release date	Prod. code	U.S. viewers (millions)
323	1	"Langley Dollar Listings"	Jennifer Graves	Nic Wegener	January 24, 2022	GAJN01	0.52
324	2	"Dressed Down"	Tim Parsons	Jeff Kauffmann	January 31, 2022	GAJN02	0.47
325	3	"The Book of Fischer"	Chris Bennett	Parker Deay	February 7, 2022	GAJN03	0.40
326	4	"A Roger Story"	Josue Cervantes	Joe Chandler	February 14, 2022	GAJN04	0.51
327	5	"Epic Powder Dump"	Shawn Murray	Tim Saccardo	February 21, 2022	GAJN05	0.61
328	6	"American Dad Graffito"	John O'Day	Kevin Tyler	February 28, 2022	GAJN06	0.51
329	7	"Beyond the Alcove or: How I Learned to Stop Worrying and Love Klaus"	Jansen Yee	Joel Hurwitz	March 7, 2022	GAJN07	0.49
330	8	"A Song of Knives and Fire"	Joe Daniello	Charles Suozzi	March 14, 2022	GAJN08	0.49
331	9	"The Curious Case of the Old Hole"	Chris Bennett	Soren Bowie	September 5, 2022	GAJN11	0.43
332	10	"Gold Top Nuts"	Jennifer Graves	Brett Cawley & Robert Maitia	September 12, 2022 (Note: This episode was first released on Video On Demand on July 11, 2022 on Amazon.)	GAJN09	0.39
333	11	"The Three Fs"	Shawn Murray	Alisha Ketry	September 19, 2022	GAJN13	0.43
334	12	"Smooshed: A Love Story"	John O'Day	Nicole Shabtai	September 26, 2022	GAJN14	0.50
335	13	"The Fast and the Spurious"	Joe Daniello	Curtis Cook	October 3, 2022	GAJN16	0.38
336	14	"A League of His Own"	Josue Cervantes	Sam Brenner	October 10, 2022	GAJN12	0.50
337	15	"You Are Here"	Tim Parsons	Joe Chandler	October 31, 2022	GAJN18	0.34
338	16	"I Heard You Wanna Buy Some Speakers"	Jansen Yee	Paul Stroud	November 7, 2022	GAJN15	0.37
339	17	"Hayley Was a Girl Scout?"	Jennifer Graves	Yolanda Carney	November 14, 2022	GAJN17	0.36
340	18	"Please Please Jeff"	Chris Bennett	Laura Beason	November 21, 2022	GAJN19	0.38
341	19	"Jambalaya"	Josue Cervantes	Nic Wegener	November 28, 2022	GAJN20	0.34
342	20	"Gernot and Strudel"	Shawn Murray	Zack Rosenblatt	December 5, 2022	GAJN21	0.34
343	21	"Echoes"	John O'Day	Jeff Kauffmann	December 12, 2022	GAJN22	0.47
344	22	"The Grounch"	Tim Parsons	Zack Rosenblatt	December 19, 2022	GAJN10	0.23

=== Season 20 (2023) ===
No. overall	No. in season	Title	Directed by	Written by	Original release date	Prod. code	U.S. viewers (millions)
345	1	"Fellow Traveler"	Joe Daniello	Brett Cawley & Robert Maitia	March 27, 2023	HAJN02	0.47
346	2	"The Professor and the Coach"	Jansen Yee	Joe Chandler	April 3, 2023	HAJN01	0.35
347	3	"Viced Principal"	Jennifer Graves	Parker Deay	April 10, 2023	HAJN03	0.40
348	4	"The Pleasanting at Smith House"	Tim Parsons	Joel Hurwitz	April 17, 2023	HAJN04	0.40
349	5	"Stretched Thin"	Chris Bennett	Sam Brenner	May 1, 2023	HAJN05	0.39
350	6	"Better on Paper"	Joe Daniello	Alisha Ketry	May 8, 2023	HAJN10	0.38
351	7	"Cow I Met Your Moo-ther"	John O'Day	Zack Rosenblatt	May 15, 2023	HAJN08	0.34
352	8	"Stan Fixes a Shingle"	Josue Cervantes	Tim Saccardo	May 22, 2023	HAJN06	0.33
353	9	"Saving Face"	Jennifer Graves	Charles Suozzi	May 29, 2023	HAJN11	0.29
354	10	"Frantastic Voyage"	Tim Parsons	Soren Bowie	September 4, 2023	HAJN12	0.33
355	11	"A Little Mystery"	Chris Bennett	Laura Beason	September 11, 2023	HAJN13	0.32
356	12	"Don't You Be My Neighbor"	Josue Cervantes	Paul Stroud	September 18, 2023	HAJN14	0.26
357	13	"Productive Panic"	Shawn Murray	Nicole Shabtai	September 25, 2023	HAJN15	0.34
358	14	"Multiverse of American Dadness"	John O'Day	Curtis Cook	October 2, 2023	HAJN16	0.29
359	15	"Z.O.I.N.C.S."	Shawn Murray	Jeff Kauffmann	October 30, 2023	HAJN07	0.28
360	16	"A New Era for the Smith House"	Jansen Yee	Yolanda Carney	November 6, 2023	HAJN17	0.34
361	17	"Between a Ring and a Hardass"	Joe Daniello	Kevin Tyler	November 13, 2023	HAJN18	0.36
362	18	"Footprints"	Jennifer Graves	Joe Chandler	November 20, 2023	HAJN19	0.34
363	19	"Steve, Snot, and the Quest for the OG Four Loko"	Tim Parsons	Nic Wegener	November 27, 2023	HAJN20	0.31
364	20	"The Pink Sphinx Holds Her Hearts on the Turn"	Chris Bennett	Brett Cawley & Robert Maitia	December 4, 2023	HAJN21	0.32
365	21	"A Little Extra Scratch"	Josue Cervantes	Jeff Kauffmann	December 11, 2023	HAJN22	0.27
366	22	"Into the Jingleverse"	Jansen Yee	Nic Wegener	December 18, 2023	HAJN09	0.20

=== Season 21 (2024–25) ===
No. overall	No. in season	Title	Directed by	Written by	Original release date	Prod. code	U.S. viewers (millions)
367	1	"The Grocery Store Bank"	Shawn Murray	Brett Cawley & Robert Maitia	October 28, 2024	JAJN01	0.23
368	2	"Brown Lotus"	John O'Day	Nic Wegener	November 4, 2024	JAJN02	0.22
369	3	"I've Got a Friend in Me"	Jansen Yee	Jeff Kauffmann	November 11, 2024	JAJN03	0.23
370	4	"Touch the Sun: A Chimborazo Adventure"	Joe Daniello	Zack Rosenblatt	November 18, 2024	JAJN04	0.26
371	5	"Under (and Over, and Beside) the Boardwalk"	Jennifer Graves	Parker Deay	November 25, 2024	JAJN05	0.27
372	6	"The Violence of the Clams"	Tim Parsons	Tim Saccardo	December 2, 2024	JAJN06	0.30
373	7	"An Adult Woman"	Chris Bennett	Nicole Shabtai	December 9, 2024	JAJN07	0.24
374	8	"Piece by Piece"	Josue Cervantes	Alisha Ketry	December 16, 2024	JAJN08	0.23
375	9	"Nasty Christmas"	John O'Day	Joel Hurwitz	December 23, 2024	JAJN10	0.26
376	10	"Idiot Rich"	Shawn Murray	Andrew Rose	December 30, 2024	JAJN09	0.23
377	11	"Killer Mimosa"	Jansen Yee	Soren Bowie	January 6, 2025	JAJN11	0.32
378	12	"The Legend of Mike Madonia, the Rototiller Man"	Joe Daniello	Paul Stroud	January 13, 2025	JAJN12	0.23
379	13	"The Clearview Motel"	Jennifer Graves	Sam Brenner	January 20, 2025	JAJN13	0.23
380	14	"The Girl Who Cried Space Jam"	Tim Parsons	Curtis Cook	January 27, 2025	JAJN14	0.28
381	15	"Get Him to the Greek Lifestyle"	Chris Bennett	Kevin Tyler	February 3, 2025	JAJN15	0.26
382	16	"The Mystery of the Missing Bazooka Shark Babe"	Josue Cervantes	Yolanda Carney	February 10, 2025	JAJN16	0.26
383	17	"Pork 'N Feelings"	Shawn Murray	Kate Spurgeon	February 17, 2025	JAJN17	0.31
384	18	"Oh Brothel, Where Art Thou?"	John O'Day	Jeff Kauffmann	February 24, 2025	JAJN18	0.32
385	19	"The Sickness"	Jansen Yee	Zack Rosenblatt	March 3, 2025	JAJN21	0.25
386	20	"Silicon Steve"	Joe Daniello	Nic Wegener	March 10, 2025	JAJN20	0.35
387	21	"Guardian"	Tim Parsons	Brian Boyle	March 17, 2025	JAJN22	0.32
388	22	"What Great Advancements!"	Jennifer Graves	Brett Cawley & Robert Maitia	March 24, 2025	JAJN19	0.24

=== Season 22 (2026) ===
No. overall	No. in season	Title	Directed by	Written by	Original release date	Prod. code	U.S. viewers (millions)
389	1	"Aw Rats, A Pool Party"	Chris Bennett	Matt Weitzman	February 22, 2026	KAJN01	0.79
390	2	"The Flume Flume Room"	Josue Cervantes	Brett Cawley & Robert Maitia	March 1, 2026	KAJN02	0.67
391	3	"Powering Through"	Shawn Murray	Jeff Kauffmann	March 8, 2026	KAJN03	0.71
392	4	"Camera Stan"	John O'Day	Parker Deay	March 15, 2026	KAJN04	0.57
393	5	"Idol Threat"	Jansen Yee	Soren Bowie	April 12, 2026	KAJN05	0.60
394	6	"The Treasure of Old Chinatown"	Joe Daniello	Nic Wegener	April 26, 2026	KAJN06	0.72
395	7	"Reaper Madness"	Jennifer Graves	Alisha Ketry	May 3, 2026	KAJN07	0.55
396	8	"Dude, You're Getting a Del!"	Tim Parsons	Joel Hurwitz	May 10, 2026	KAJN08	0.54
397	9	"Where the Wild Boars Are"	Chris Bennett	Kevin Tyler	May 17, 2026	KAJN09	0.72
398	10	"Dumbston Checks In"	Josue Cervantes	Curtis Cook	June 21, 2026	KAJN10	0.61
399	11	"A Donkey's Shame"	Shawn Murray	Nicole Shabtai	June 21, 2026	KAJN11	0.55
400	12	"400?!"	John O'Day	Zack Rosenblatt	September 13, 2026	KAJN12	1.01
401	13	"Tales from the Outer Frontier"	Jansen Yee	Sam Brenner	September 13, 2026	KAJN13	0.74

== Upcoming episodes without a scheduled release date ==
Title	Written by
"Stan Gets Sucked In"	Paul Stroud
"The Golden Hand Garage"	Brian Boyle
