= Lost in Space (American Dad!) =

- American Dad! episode
- Episode no.: Season 9 Episode 18
- Directed by: Chris Bennett
- Written by: Mike Barker
- Production code: 7AJN20
- Original air date: May 5, 2013

Guest appearances
- Michael McKean as Emperor Zing; Sean Hayes as Foster; Sinbad as himself; Paget Brewster as Shape-Shifting Alien; Pete Holmes

Episode chronology
← Previous "The Full Cognitive Redaction of Avery Bullock by the Coward Stan Smith"	Next → "Da Flippity Flop"
- American Dad! season 9

"Lost in Space" is the eighteenth episode of the ninth season of American Dad!. The episode aired on May 5, 2013, on Fox's Animation Domination lineup. The episode was written by series co-creator Mike Barker and directed by series regular Chris Bennett. "Lost in Space" was promoted as episode 150 by Fox and numerous mainstream media reports; it is actually episode 151, while the episode "The Full Cognitive Redaction of Avery Bullock by the Coward Stan Smith" is episode 150. "Lost in Space" continues a plot line established in the episode "Naked to the Limit, One More Time." In addition, several of the episodes that aired in between "Naked to the Limit, One More Time" and "Lost in Space" contribute to the plot line in question.

Not to be confused with Roger's birth planet (Fox has misreported this episode as the revealing of this), the setting of "Lost in Space" is simply a spaceship owned by members of Roger's alien race. The episode centers around Jeff Fischer's attempts to escape a slave spaceship full of aliens (the slave-owning aliens of which are Roger's race) that he was suddenly shoved onto by Roger in "Naked to the Limit, One More Time". In "Lost in Space," Jeff endeavors to prove to slave-owning aliens the legitimacy of his love for wife Hayley Smith in order to escape the spaceship.

"Lost in Space" is unconventional in that Jeff is, for the most part, the only main character from the show to appear, although Roger and Hayley have brief cameo appearances, and the rest of the family makes a brief appearance together in the beginning recap. The episode received positive reviews from television critics, with praise directed to the visual style and humor.

== Plot ==
Jeff is unconscious, hanging from a ceiling in a solitary confinement. An alien named Foster enters and awakens Jeff. Foster reveals himself as the head of Emperor Zing's security team. Emperor Zing, Foster, the rest of his security team, along with half the residents of the spaceship belong to Roger's race of aliens. They are the slave owners on the spaceship. The rest of the aliens populating the ship are miscellaneous races of aliens that have been abducted from their respective home planets and are being used as slaves. Being toured around the spaceship, Jeff learns that it is a bizarre shopping mall-like facility. Foster sends Jeff to work at a shawarma food stand, where Jeff encounters Sinbad (the only other human on the spaceship), who had been abducted two months prior. After the emperor of the ship, Zing, walks by, Jeff protests that he misses his wife but is ignored. After work, Sinbad shows Jeff around the ship and eventually takes him to a bar. Jeff eventually finds out that the only way Emperor Zing will allow any of his captives to escape is to prove that they are truly in love with another. Despite reports that many of the slaves on the ship had previously tried this and all failed, Jeff decides to attempt the test. However, Sinbad reveals there is a cost: if Jeff fails to prove his love, his penis will be removed and stored in a fishbowl—an operation the aliens call "the smoothening" (similar to the missing genitalia of a plastic doll).

Jeff goes ahead with the test, which consists of a monster alien, named The Majestic, televising Jeff's memories from his relationship with Hayley. The memories are presented via multiple video screens, allowing the Emperor and the rest of the slave-owning aliens to determine whether or not Jeff's love for Hayley is sincere. However, The Majestic only shows memories in which Jeff had been a jerk to Hayley. With that, Emperor Zing declares that Jeff had failed. Jeff counters by saying that he truly loves Hayley, but Zing ignores him. The next day, a moping Jeff is repeatedly hit on by one of the other slaves, an alien species with the ability to transform itself. While Jeff initially has no problems declining the slave alien's advances, he becomes tempted when the creature transforms itself into a Hayley lookalike. With that, Jeff attempts to appease the slave alien and have sex one last time before losing his penis. However, his scruples and love for Hayley get in the way, and he is unable to comply. Jeff then decides to confront The Majestic and ask why he only played negative memories of his relationship.

After lowering himself into a pit where The Majestic resides, Jeff complains to the creature that he did not show any of the positive memories of his marriage. The Majestic reveals that Emperor Zing commanded him to only play negative memories and that Zing himself had a lost love. When Jeff learns of this, he decides to reveal the Emperor's failed relationship. The next day, the transforming alien presents itself as Jeff. When Foster approaches the Jeff lookalike with a buzzsaw, the Jeff lookalike reveals itself and kicks Foster off the platform. Jeff then appears, standing on top of The Majestic. He gets The Majestic to present all the positive memories of his marriage. The Majestic also captures Emperor Zing and displays his memories for the rest of the aliens to see. The Majestic reveals that Zing was in a relationship with Roger, however, Roger cheated on Zing with a human male. The other slave-owning aliens, enraged over Zing telling them that romantic love was an impossibility, start a riot.

While Zing's security aliens are distracted, Jeff along with Sinbad make their way to an escape pod. However, many of Zing's security aliens are sent after them. Sinbad fights off the guards and ends up being heavily injured. Jeff begs him to come with him, however, Sinbad is killed when a guard slashes through his chest. Jeff quickly leaves and escapes the slave ship. As Jeff begins his journey home, he is sad that he had to leave Sinbad, but he is happy that he will return home. He quickly becomes discouraged when he learns there are over 47,000 planets named Earth, and that it will take a long time to reach his destination. In the post-credits, Sinbad returns, this time as a Jedi-like ghost, to aid Jeff on his journey home.

== Production ==
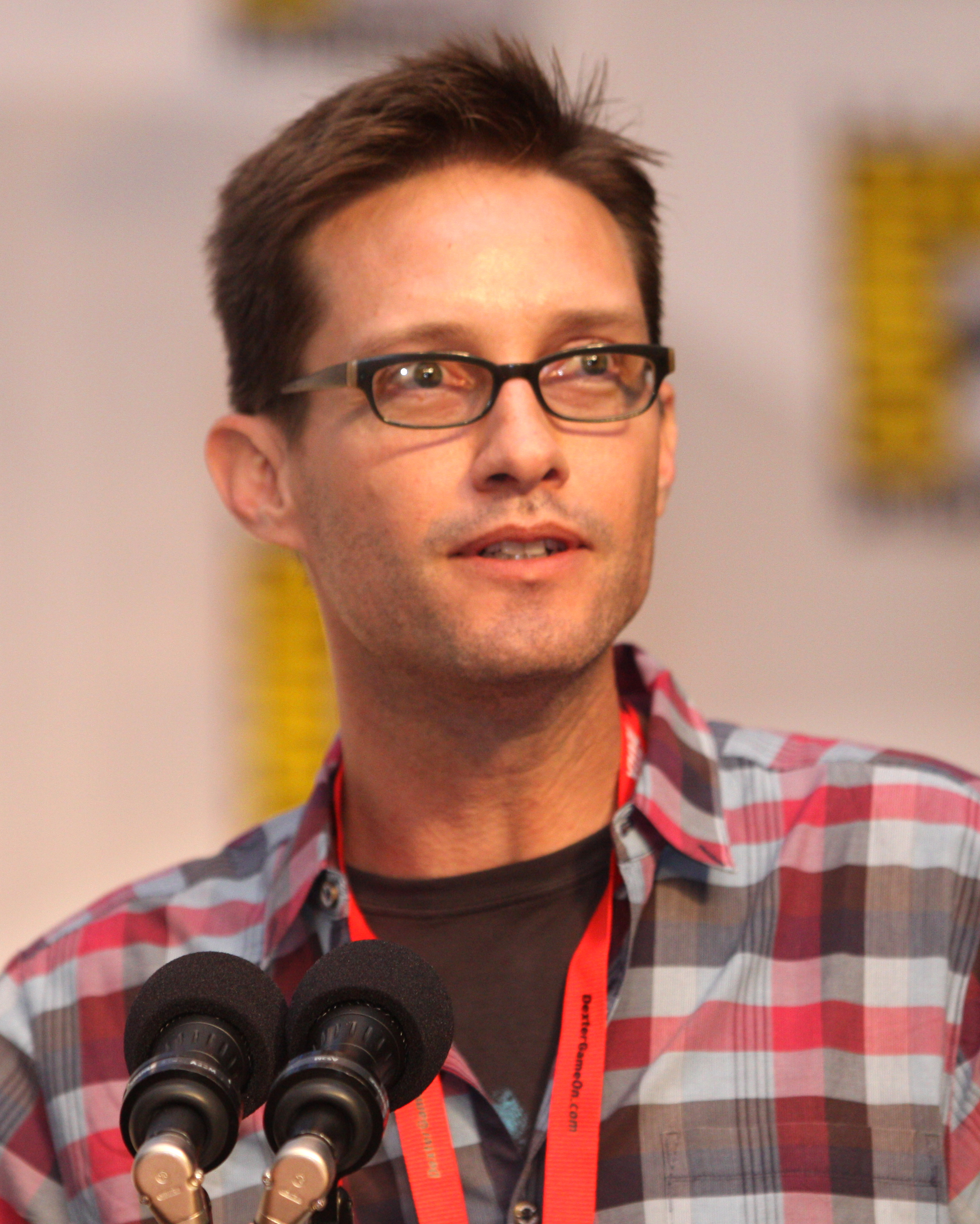
Mike Barker wrote the episode.

Series co-creator Mike Barker wrote: "Lost in Space". The setting does not reveal Roger's birth planet but a spaceship owned by his alien species. Barker once stated that he did not want to show Roger's birth planet or species. At the time, he feared that viewers might grow more interested in a plot line involving his alien planet as opposed to the usual setting of the show.

Not to be confused with a two-part episode, the storyline of Jeff being trapped in space is more of a story arc, beginning with "Naked to the Limit, One More Time" and continuing through several episodes before "Lost in Space." Among the series of episodes broadcasts in between and that touch on the plot in question includes "Spelling Bee My Baby," "The Missing Kink," etc.

Regular composers Walter Murphy and Joel McNeely did not score the episode; instead, American rock band Wax Fang provided the music. Barker was a fan of the band, their songs inspiring him with several visuals for the episode. The alien creature that plays Jeff's poor memories was inspired by the song "Majestic," and the name was also taken from the song. Barker states that he generally uses music to help him write and that he has difficulty otherwise.

== Reception ==
"Lost in Space" first aired on Fox on May 5, 2013. Due to a NASCAR rain delay, the episode aired 30 minutes later than American Dad! usually does. "Lost in Space" received the highest rating of the night, beating new episodes of Family Guy and The Simpsons and all other shows on Fox—receiving 5.06 million U.S. viewers, with a 2.1/5 rating share in the 18-49 demographic group.

Critical reception for "Lost in Space" was mostly positive. Kevin McFarland of The A.V. Club gave the episode an A− and stated: "It may take a while for Jeff to get back to his beloved, and he’ll go through more hell to get there, but American Dad! made the best of a risky situation with this episode." Robert H. Dawson of TV Equals gave a positive review, noting: "It was clear that the artists and animators had a lot of fun with the alien setting, and it pays off. A lazier show would have made all the aliens of Roger’s species look like clones of Roger, but here they all look like unique characters, even in the sweeping crowd scenes. And all the other aliens are fun, too, even the ones that just hide in the background. The episode does not need to be so full of detail, but it is, and that makes the silly sci-fi adventure all the better."
