= Minstrel Krampus =

- American Dad! episode
- Episode no.: Season 10; Episode 8
- Directed by: Josue Cervantes
- Written by: Murray Miller; Judah Miller
- Production code: 7AJN19
- Original air date: December 15, 2013

Guest appearances
- Daran Norris as Jack Smith; Danny Glover as Krampus; Charles Bradley as Krampus (singing voice)

Episode chronology
← Previous "Faking Bad"	Next → "Vision: Impossible"
- American Dad! season 10

"Minstrel Krampus" is the eighth episode of the tenth season of the American animated television series American Dad!. It first aired on the Fox Network in the United States on December 15, 2013. The episode mainly centers around Steve, who is taken away by Krampus, a monster who disciplines bad children, when he starts acting bratty during Christmas time. Steve and Krampus form an unlikely bond after sharing a musical moment, and Steve realizes Krampus' true intentions for tormenting children. Meanwhile, Hayley gets a job at an airport to pay for her families gifts.

Written by Murray Miller and Judah Miller, and directed by Josue Cervantes, the title of the episode is a play on words, being similar to the syndrome menstrual cramps. It featured guest appearances from Daran Norris, Charles Bradley, and Danny Glover, as well as other recurring actors and actresses for the series. The episode received generally positive reviews from critics, with most praise going towards Charles Bradley's singing performance as Krampus.

== Plot ==
The episode starts in the manner of a storybook, with the narrator stating that children are at their worst at Christmastime, because they have all realized that they'll still get whatever they want regardless of how they behave. The Smith family goes shopping at a toy store. When Francine rejects a toy that Steve wants, he complains—even slapping Stan in the face—saying, "I'm a bad boy and I get what I want", then breaks into song. Stan and Francine take Steve to visit Stan's imprisoned father Jack and teach him a lesson. Jack tells the legend of Krampus, a former companion of Santa Claus. Jack claims that as a boy growing up in Bavaria, he was visited by Krampus, but before Krampus could punish him, Jack imprisoned him in a large copper pot full of strudel, where he has been trapped ever since.

In a sideplot, Klaus almost tells Hayley what he got from the family, but Hayley cuts him off, singing a song about picking the perfect gift. She visits Roger's bar and asks to work for him, but Roger has already hired a number of water polo players. Stan finds the strudel pot in his basement with Jack's other belongings and, desperate to get Steve under control, opens it. Krampus escapes and kidnaps Steve, and demands that Stan deliver Jack in exchange. Stan gets Jack released from prison to assist him in locating Krampus, but Jack instead steals Stan's car and flees. Krampus takes Steve to an isolated castle populated by sentient household objects (in the manner of Beauty and the Beast) and sings a song about his legacy and purpose in life, scolding Steve for his rotten behavior.

Back at the Smith house, Stan tells Roger about the problem and that only Jack knows where Krampus went. Roger suggests asking Santa, which Stan is reluctant to do since Santa has sworn revenge on the family. With no better option, Roger uses the water polo players to take Stan to the North Pole; Santa agrees to help, only if they help him kill Krampus. Back at the castle, the group of household objects explain that Krampus is not bad, just serving his role in punishing misbehaving children. In a soul performance, Krampus himself explains that his punishments deter kids from turning out bad. Krampus blames his failure to punish Jack resulting in Jack growing up to be a criminal and neglectful father, and he seeks him out to apologize rather than punish him. Steve apologizes to Krampus for his bad behavior and Krampus thanks Steve for reminding him of his purpose. Stan, Roger, and Santa set out on a journey to kill Krampus. Stan, Santa, and some of Santa's elves reach the castle and battle with the household objects, killing them and confronting Krampus. Santa shoots Krampus to death and reveals that he was the villain all along: Krampus disciplines children because he genuinely loves and cares about them, while Santa just spoils them and makes money off of it through his investments in toy companies. Santa then tries to kill Stan, but just as he fires his candy-cane-striped revolver, Jack crashes through a window on skis and takes the bullet in his chest. One of the skis impales Santa's chest, forcing him and the elves to withdraw. Jack then tells Stan that he realizes the importance of family, saying he's proud of Stan and that the world needs Krampus, then dies. His and Krampus' blood mix together and Krampus' soul goes to Jack's body, making him the new Krampus. He leaves with a warning to "better be nice or I'll beat you until blood comes out your ears and eyes. Merry Christmas! And also your ass!"

== Production ==
The episode was originally scheduled to air on December 16, 2012 (explaining the 2012 copyright stamp in the end credits, despite airing in 2013), but was replaced by a repeat of "Wheels & the Legman and the Case of Grandpa's Key" out of sensitivity for the Sandy Hook Elementary School shooting. To compensate for not airing the episode at its intended date, Fox aired the episode "National Treasure 4: Baby Franny: She's Doing Well: The Hole Story" on December 23, 2012.

During the episode's production, Danny Glover provided Krampus' spoken voice, but refused to sing for the episode. Krampus' singing voice was eventually given to Charles Bradley. When asked about the episode, series co-creator Mike Barker said they were going to make it "as dark as we can this year."

== Cultural references ==
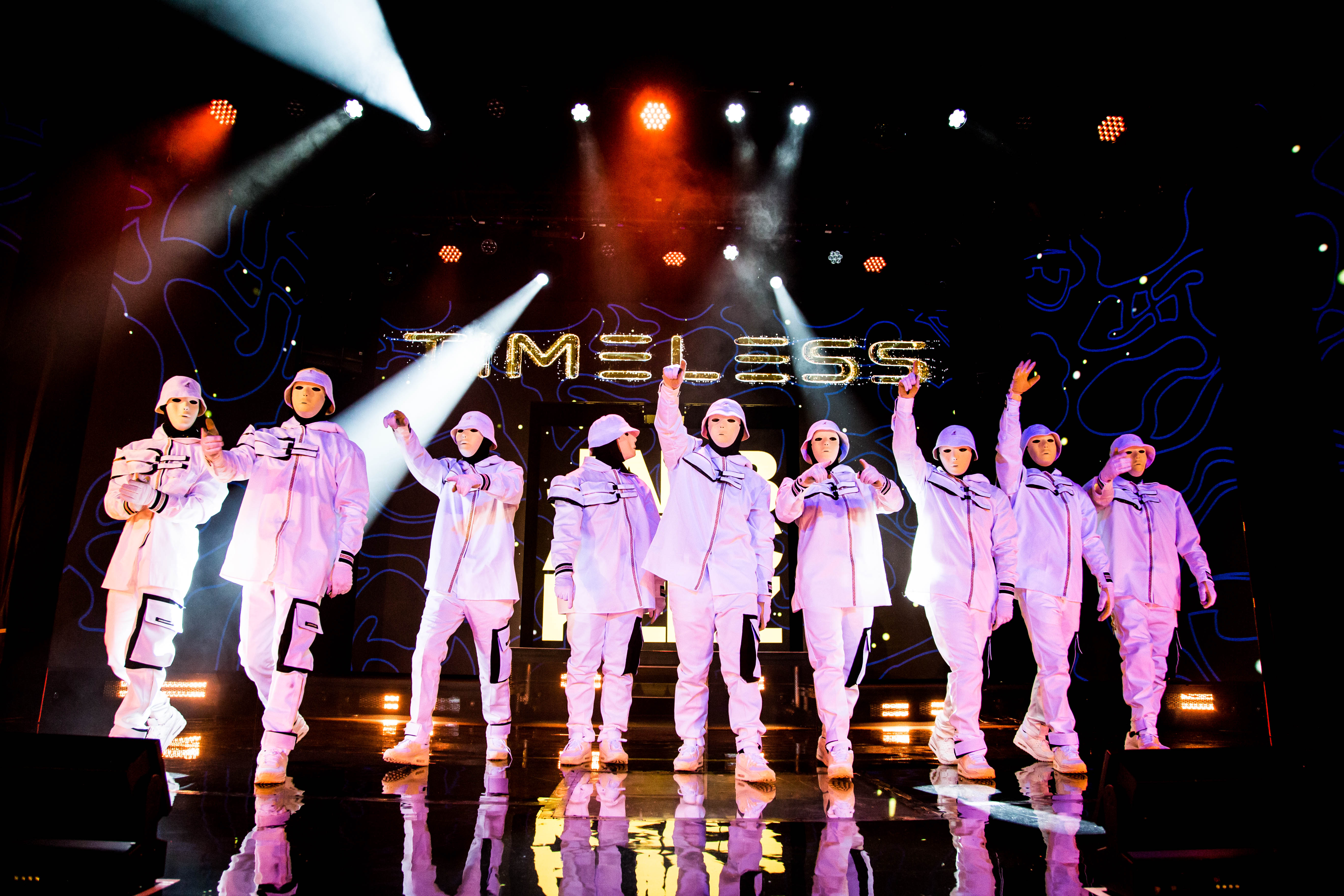
A quick sequence during a musical number depicts Steve and his back-up dancers dressed in a similar fashion to Jabbawockeez.

The episode makes several references to popular culture, particularly from film. The episode's plot acts as a homage to the 1991 animated film Beauty and the Beast. The living household items inside of Krampus' house and Jack Smith's transformation scene both parody Beauty and the Beast. When Stan and Francine walk in on Steve opening his Christmas presents early, Francine shouts "Steven, by the power of Greyskull, what do you think you’re doing?". The phrase "by the power of Greyskull" is one of He-Man's catchphrases in He-Man and the Masters of the Universe. During Steve's opening musical number, him and a few back-up dancers dress in a similar fashion to the dance team Jabbawockeez.

The episode also features the song "Iron Swan" by The Sword off their album Age of Winters. Their song "Barael's Blade" was used in the Season 6 Christmas episode "Rapture's Delight"

== Reception ==
"Minstrel Krampus" was first broadcast on December 15, 2013 as part of the animation television night on Fox. The episode ended the line up, something American Dad usually does. It was viewed by 5.0 million viewers upon its original airing, despite airing simultaneously with Sunday Night Football on NBC and an episode of Revenge on ABC. The episode was the least watched show on Animation Domination that night, losing to Bob's Burgers, Family Guy and The Simpsons with 8.30 million. It achieved a 3.0 rating in the 18–49 demographic group, according to the Nielsen ratings, the lowest rating in the line-up. The episode's total viewership and ratings were the highest of the season up to that point, and were significantly up from the previous episode, "Faking Bad", which was viewed by 4.36 million viewers upon its initial airing, and garnered a 2.1 rating in the 18–49 demographic. The episode's ratings and total viewership were also the highest since the season nine episode "Lost in Space", which was viewed by 5.00 million viewers and acquired a 2.3 rating in the 18-49 demographic.

"Minstrel Krampus" was met with generally positive reviews from critics. Kevin McFarland of The A.V. Club gave the episode a positive review and an A− rating, saying "I loved pretty much every part of this. The Hayley plot provides enough simple laughs before basically trailing off into nothing. Francine has very little to do outside of getting verbally abused by Steve. But Stan's interactions with his father and Santa, and mostly Steve growing into the Belle role and Krampus as a soulful, James Brown-esque Beast (sung by Charles Bradley) was the best part of this Christmas special. It's not my favorite that the show has ever done, but it’s yet another example that American Dad knows how to do Christmas episodes that stand out during the season more than any other program on television." Tommy North of Bubbleblabber gave the episode a mixed review, saying it was an "overall, entertaining episode" and that "(the) Christmas specials of Animation Domination are something I look forward to. They really emphasize family and really that is what this time of the year is all about". He went on to criticize the episode's humor, saying that "Minstrel Krampus didn’t necessarily make me laugh a whole lot… it wasn’t the funniest episode, in my opinion. The relationship between Krampus and Steve is a good example. When I first realized that the Krampus thing was going to be a nod to Beauty and the Beast, I started to anticipate much different scenarios than the ones that played out. It sort of let me down."
