= National Treasure 4: Baby Franny: She's Doing Well: The Hole Story =

- American Dad! episode
- Episode no.: Season 9 Episode 7
- Directed by: Chris Bennett
- Written by: Murray Miller
- Production code: 7AJN04
- Original air date: December 23, 2012

Guest appearance
- Will Forte as Firefighter Henry Watkins

Episode chronology
← Previous "Adventures in Hayleysitting"	Next → "Finger Lenting Good"
- American Dad! season 9

"National Treasure 4: Baby Franny: She's Doing Well: The Hole Story" is the seventh episode of the ninth season and the 140th overall episode of the animated comedy series American Dad!. It aired on Fox in the United States on December 23, 2012, and is written by Murray Miller and directed by Chris Bennett.

In the episode, when Greg and Terry's new talk show does a news story on the 35th anniversary of the rescue of "Baby Franny", Francine begins to feel guilty over wasting her life while the fireman who rescued her from a well died in her place. Meanwhile, Stan and Roger team up with Toshi's dad Mr. Hideki Yoshida to invent and market sexy shoes for male strippers. However, the deal sours when Hideki double-crosses Stan and Roger and keeps all the royalties for their creation to himself.

== Plot ==
Francine is in a perky mood until Greg and Terry feature her in a story of "baby Franny", a toddler that fell into a well and was rescued. Francine cuts off the broadcast and makes it clear that she wants no part of the past. As Greg and Terry try to get her on their show, Hayley and Steve plot to get her on the show. They take her to the studio to tell her story and surprise her to her dismay. It is revealed Henry Watkins, the firefighter that rescued her had died in the attempt, leaving behind a family and leaving Francine in the spotlight as she has a nervous breakdown, leaving Steve to get her off of the stage. Back home, Francine feels guilty because the firefighter gave his life for her and she feels that she did nothing with her life and that having a family is not good enough. She struggles to find something to prove she did something with her life and reveals that she is really good at math.

Steve gets her to try to solve a previously unsolvable math problem. Thinking she arrived at a solution, she finds she has the wrong answer. As she returns home she has to face that she still hasn't done anything. At a big media event honoring her, she struggles to come up with an idea and escapes into the same well she fell into as a toddler where she finds Henry is still alive. As Francine rejoices that Henry is alive, she climbs out and tells everyone that Henry is still alive and pulls him out. To everyone's horror, Henry reacts to his former wife by biting her nose off and spitting it in his son's face. Henry wants to return but Francine vows to help him adjust to life again. Francine takes him to get him cleaned up and introduces him to Klaus.

In the middle of the night, Francine hears a scream and finds Henry tried to have sex with Klaus. He leaps out the window to return to his well. Following him, Francine tells him how she feels she wasted the chance at life he gave her, but he admits that she doesn't have to do anything great and that he is the one who decided to give his life for her. All he asks in return is for her to have a happy life and give him pictures of her breasts. As she agrees and continues to do so for the rest of her life, she is unaware that Henry died jumping back into his well.

Meanwhile, as Roger returns from a date with a man, he runs into Stan coming out of the bathroom in his underwear and dress shoes and they get an idea for a big entrepreneurial opportunity of male stripper shoes. They work on a design and decide to seek start-up capital from Toshi's father. Taking their product to Mr. Yoshida, he writes them a check on the condition that they kill his wife. As they spy on Mrs. Yoshida, Stan can't go through with it. As they spot a truck passing with their shoe advertisement, they find Yoshida stole their idea.

== Production ==
The episode "Minstrel Krampus" was scheduled to air on December 16, 2012, but was replaced by a repeat of "Wheels & the Legman and the Case of Grandpa's Key" out of sensitivity for the Sandy Hook Elementary School shooting. To compensate for this, the episode "National Treasure 4: Baby Franny: She's Doing Well: The Hole Story" was aired on December 23, 2012.

== Reception ==
Kevin McFarland of The A.V. Club gave the episode a B, saying "It’s a pity that the annual American Dad off-the-wall Christmas episode got bumped this year, but in light of how this show’s particular tradition has skewed toward violence, it’s not that unexpected. So instead of perhaps the most-anticipated American Dad episode of the year, we get a surprisingly introspective Francine-centric episode that didn't blow the doors off, but is a solid final outing for the show in 2012." The episode was watched by a total of 4.21 million people, this made it the third most watched show on Animation Domination that night, beating a repeat of The Simpsons but losing to Family Guy and another repeat of The Simpsons with 5.54 million.
