= Sinbad (comedian) =

American comedian and actor (born 1956)

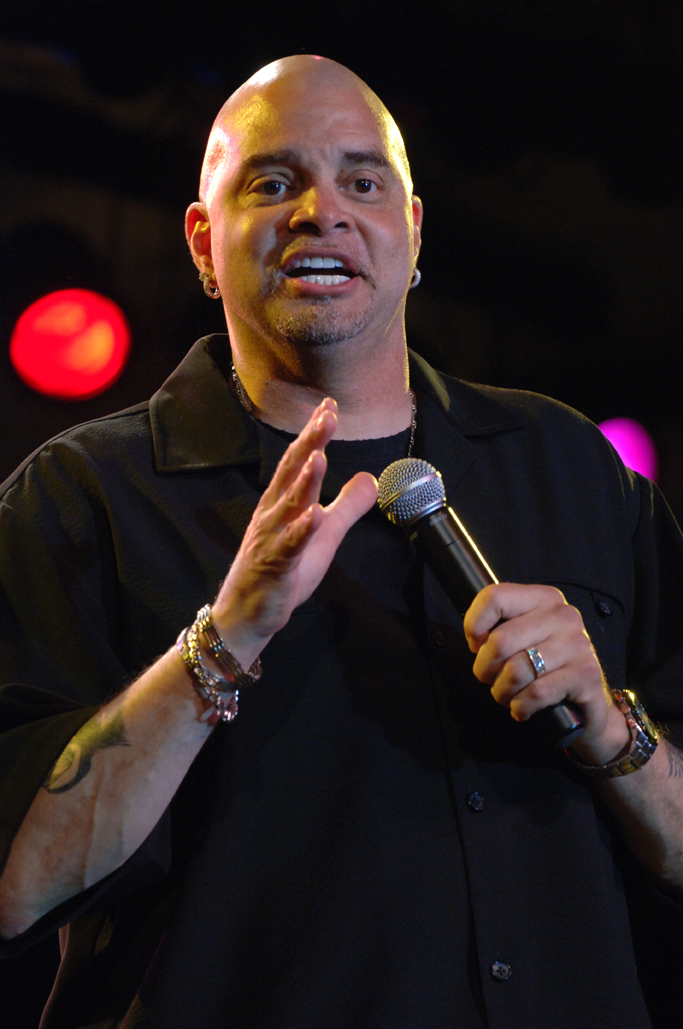
- Sinbad in 2008
- Born: David Adkins; November 10, 1956 (age 70); Benton Harbor, Michigan, U.S.
- Occupations: Stand-up comedian; actor
- Spouses: Meredith Fuller (m. 1985; div. 1992) (m. 2002)
- Children: 2

Comedy career
- Years active: 1978–present
- Medium: Stand-up; film; television
- Genres: Observational comedy, political satire, black comedy, surreal humor, character comedy, clean comedy
- Subjects: Everyday life, self-deprecation, marriage, parenting, American politics, current events, family, friend, pop culture, race relations, racism, relationships, aging

David Adkins (born November 10, 1956), better known by his stage name Sinbad, is an American stand-up comedian and actor. He became known in the 1990s from being featured on his own HBO specials, appearing on several television series, most notably as Coach Walter Oakes in A Different World (1987–1991) and as David Bryan on The Sinbad Show (1993–1994). He has also appeared in films such as That's Adequate (1989), Coneheads (1993), Houseguest (1995), Jingle All the Way (1996), Good Burger (1997), Crazy as Hell (2002) and Planes (2013).

== Early life ==
Sinbad was born November 10, 1956, in Benton Harbor, Michigan, the son of Louise and a Baptist minister, Donald Beckley Adkins Sr. He has five siblings: Donna, Dorothea, Mark, Michael, and Donald Jr. His paternal grandmother was of Irish descent. Sinbad attended Benton Harbor High School and graduated in 1974. He attended college from 1974 to 1978 at the University of Denver in Denver, Colorado, where he lettered two seasons for the Denver Pioneers men's basketball team.

=== Military service ===
Sinbad served in the United States Air Force as a boom operator aboard KC-135 Stratotankers. While assigned to the 384th Air Refueling Wing at McConnell Air Force Base in Wichita, Kansas, he would often travel downtown to perform stand-up comedy. He competed as a comedian/MC in the Air Force's Talent Contest in 1981. Sinbad was almost dismissed with a dishonorable discharge for various misbehaviors, including going AWOL.

I didn't make the Air Force basketball team and went into denial. So, I kept going AWOL. My mother kept begging me to go back. I told her, "No, I'm not going back. I'll just grow a beard. They won't recognize me. I'll just be another black man with a beard." I was going to Georgia Tech to learn about computers. I'd go AWOL all the time. I'd just leave. I'd come back, hoping they'd throw me out.

After a series of incidents, he was eventually discharged "for parking my car in the wrong position."

== Career ==
In an attempt to stand out in the entertainment industry, Adkins worked under the professional name Sinbad, which he chose out of admiration for Sinbad the Sailor. He began his stand-up comic career appearing on Star Search. Sinbad won his round against fellow comedian Dennis Miller and made it to the finals before losing to John Kassir.

He soon was cast on The Redd Foxx Show, a short-lived sitcom, playing Byron Lightfoot.

=== A Different World ===
In 1987, Sinbad landed a role in A Different World, a spin-off of The Cosby Show built around Lisa Bonet's character Denise Huxtable. Previously, Sinbad appeared in a one-off role on The Cosby Show as car salesman Davis Sarrette. While Bonet only stayed with the program for a season, Sinbad stayed with the cast from 1988 until 1991 as Coach Walter Oakes.

Walter began to fall in love with a girl named Jaleesa Vinson, played by Dawnn Lewis. They dated, and eventually became engaged but decided to cancel the wedding due to differing outlooks on life.

=== The Sinbad Show ===
By the early 1990s, his popularity had grown enough for Fox to greenlight The Sinbad Show, which premiered September 16, 1993. In it, Sinbad played 35-year-old David Bryan, a bachelor who decides to become a foster parent to two children after becoming emotionally attached to them.

Around that time, Sinbad had received joint custody of his two children: Royce, age 4; and Paige, age 7, and told the press that these experiences informed him of single parenting.

Black men are already responsible, already take care of our duties, but nobody emphasizes that. I hear all this bad talk against men and their children. I just got so tired of it. More than anything else, I'm showing that life has changed, the world has changed. And now the key is not going to just be parenting, it's going to be mentoring, where people who are not even in your family are going to have to go in and help. And we are going to accept that responsibility, which we used to do in our culture.

The Sinbad Show was canceled, with the last episode airing April 21, 1994. However, the role earned him a nomination in the 1995 Kids' Choice Awards for "Favorite Television Actor".

=== Films and other projects ===
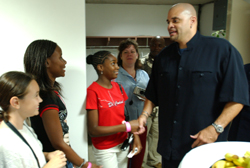
Sinbad meeting with Zama American High School students in September 2004

In 1990, Sinbad did his first stand-up comedy special for HBO called Sinbad: Brain Damaged. The special was recorded at Morehouse College in Atlanta, Georgia. In 1993, Sinbad did his next stand up special in New York City's Paramount Theater at Madison Square Garden called Sinbad: Afros and Bellbottoms for which he won a 1995 Image Award. He was brought back in 1996 for Sinbad: Son of a Preacher Man, recorded at the Paramount Theatre in Denver, Colorado, and again in 1997 for Sinbad: Nothin' but the Funk. All of these shows have been released on VHS and DVD.

Sinbad again won an NAACP Image Award in 1998 for his role in Sinbad's Summer Jam III: '70s Soul Music Festival. By 1995, Sinbad created a company called "David & Goliath Productions", that was located in Studio City.

From 1989 to 1991, Sinbad was host of It's Showtime at the Apollo, and returned in 2005, while regular host Mo'Nique was on maternity leave. He hosted an episode of Soul Train that aired January 14, 1995; appeared as a contestant in an episode of Celebrity Jeopardy! in 1998; and was the emcee for the May 2000 Miss Universe Pageant.

During the 1990s, Sinbad guest starred on an episode of Nickelodeon's All That. In one sketch, he played the father of recurring character Ishboo, dubbed "Sinboo". He also made a cameo appearance in the comedy movie Good Burger, starring Kenan & Kel, as "Mr. Wheat", a short-tempered teacher. His character was modeled after Gough Wheat, a past teacher of the movie's producer, Dan Schneider, at White Station High School in Memphis, Tennessee.

He and Phil Hartman co-starred in the comedy film Houseguest, where he plays Kevin Franklin, a Pittsburgh resident who owes $50,000 to the mob. Hartman, as Gary Young, comments to his children that they are waiting to pick up his old college friend, who is black and he has not seen for twenty years. Taking who they think to be a well-known dentist home, Young's family is stabilized by Franklin's own unstable nature. Released January 6, 1995, the film grossed $26 million in North America.

Sinbad's film roles also include First Kid, which he starred in, and Jingle All the Way (1996) opposite Arnold Schwarzenegger, Rita Wilson and the late Phil Hartman. For Jingle All the Way, Sinbad won a Blockbuster Entertainment Award for "Favorite Supporting Actor – Family"; it was also his third and final collaboration with Hartman following the latter's death in May 1998.

In March 1996, Sinbad joined First Lady Hillary Clinton and musician Sheryl Crow, in a USO tour in Bosnia and Herzegovina.

The NAACP Image Awards recognized his role in Happily Ever After: Fairy Tales for Every Child (1996), nominating him in the "Outstanding Performance in an Animated/Live-Action/Dramatic Youth or Children's Series/Special" category. He lent his voice to Riley, an animal character, in Homeward Bound II: Lost in San Francisco (1996), and later voiced the horse "Hollywood Shuffle" in Ready to Run.

In 1997, Sinbad released Sinbad's Guide to Life: Because I Know Everything, a book of comedic short essays. It was co written with David Ritz.

In August 1997, Vibe magazine started its own syndicated late night talk show, which aired on UPN, hosted by actor Chris Spencer. Spencer was fired in October, and replaced by Sinbad; the series lasted until the summer of 1998. At that same time, Sinbad performed his HBO comedy special "Nothin' But the Funk" in Aruba's Guillermo P. Trinidad Memorial Stadium.

In 1998 and 1999, Sinbad reunited with Bill Cosby and Carsey-Werner Productions, and appeared in three episodes of Cosby. In February 1999, he was featured in an infomercial for Tae Bo, where he stated that he was successfully using the Tae Bo system to become an action star.

In 2002, he appeared in three episodes of the Showtime series Resurrection Blvd. In 2004, he was named the No. 78 Greatest Stand Up Comic of All Time on "Comedy Central Presents: 100 Greatest Stand-Ups of All Time". In 2006, Maxim magazine ranked Sinbad as the "Worst Comic of All Time."

In February 2007, actor Mark Curry credited Sinbad and Bill Cosby for helping convince him not to commit suicide. Sinbad was responsible for discovering R&B trio 702, convincing their parents to let him take them to a music convention/competition under the name "Sweeta than Suga"; the group eventually being heard by music producer Michael Bivins.

Sinbad also made a cameo appearance on the television show It's Always Sunny in Philadelphia as himself in a rehab center in the episode "Dennis Reynolds: An Erotic Life", which originally aired October 23, 2008. His cameo was met with positive acclaim from fans of both him and the series.

Sinbad was the host of Thou Shalt Laugh 3. The DVD was released on November 11, 2008.

He performed his Comedy Central television special Where U Been? at Club Nokia, which was later released on DVD to even greater success. On March 14, 2010, he debuted on the Celebrity Apprentice and was fired on the second episode (March 21, 2010) after losing in the Kodak challenge as project manager, placing 13th.

Sinbad starred in a reality show on WE tv called Sinbad: It's Just Family that aired on Tuesdays at 10:00 p.m.; the show was canceled in 2011.

In 2013, Sinbad voiced Roper in the animated film Planes. The same year he had a guest role on the adult animated series American Dad!, voicing an animated version of himself in the episode "Lost in Space", then returning for the 2014 episode "The Longest Distance Relationship", and again in 2015's "Holy Shit, Jeff's Back!"

In April 2015, Sinbad appeared in a USO show at Bagram and Kandahar Air Bases in Afghanistan.

In 2017, he appeared on two episodes of Disney Junior's The Lion Guard, as the voice of Uroho the baboon. The same year, he appeared in a CollegeHumor April Fool's video consisting of newly created footage supposedly taken from a 1990s genie movie called Shazaam which never existed. The comedy drew from an Internet rumor confusing Shazaam with the real genie film titled Kazaam (1996), starring Shaquille O'Neal. The false memories of Shazaam have been explained as a confabulation of memories of the comedian wearing a genie-like costume during a TV presentation of Sinbad the Sailor movies in 1994. In addition, in the 1960s, Hanna-Barbera had an animated series about a genie called Shazzan.

In 2018 to 2019 he starred on Fox show Rel.

Sinbad returned to performing on stage with performances on April 29 and May 10, 2026, at the Comedy Ice House in Pasadena, California.

=== Apple ===
Sinbad has a long history of using and promoting Apple products, working with Apple and appearing at Apple events. Examples include numerous appearances at Macworld and WWDC shows.

On January 25, 2011, he was the celebrity speaker of MacWorld Expo 2011.

=== Music ===
Sinbad also plays percussion and drums which he most often displays after every show appearance. He has played with numerous artists and musicians under the moniker of "Memphis Red"; such as Dawnn Lewis and Adult-Urban instrumentalist (saxophonist) Journell Henry "p/k/a. J. Henry".

== Personal life ==
Sinbad married Meredith Fuller in 1985. They have two children together. The couple divorced in 1992, but remarried in 2002.

In November 2020, his family announced to the press that Sinbad was recovering from a recent stroke. In March 2024, Sinbad announced on social media that he was still recovering but that he was attempting a comeback.

=== Tax issues ===
In April 2009, Sinbad was listed as one of the ten worst tax debtors in the state of California, owing the state $2.5 million in personal income tax. On December 11, 2009, Sinbad filed for Chapter 7 bankruptcy. On February 5, 2010, it was reported that Sinbad put his 2.5-acre (1.0 ha) hilltop home up for sale in order to alleviate his tax burdens.

== Filmography ==
=== Film ===
Year	Title	Role	Notes
1986	Club Med	Himself	TV movie
1989	That's Adequate	Stand-Up Comic	
1991	Necessary Roughness	Andre Krimm	
1992	Time Out: The Truth About HIV, AIDS, and You	Condom	Video short
1993	Coneheads	Otto	
1993	The Meteor Man	Malik	
1994	Aliens for Breakfast	Areck	TV movie
1995	Houseguest	Kevin Franklin	
1996	Homeward Bound II: Lost in San Francisco	Riley (voice)	
1996	First Kid	Secret Service Agent Sam Simms	
1996	Jingle All the Way	Myron Larabee	
1996	The Cherokee Kid	Isaiah Turner / The Cherokee Kid	TV movie
1997	Good Burger	Mr. Wheat	
2000	Ready to Run	Hollywood Shuffle (voice)	TV movie
2000	Blue Shirts		
2002	Crazy as Hell	Orderly	
2002	Hansel and Gretel	Raven (voice)	
2002	Treading Water	The Security Guard	
2006	Leila	Leila's Uncle	Short
2007	Stompin'	Mr. Jackson	
2008	Cuttin' da Mustard	Bennie	
2013	Planes	Roper (voice)	
2014	Vitaminamulch: Air Spectacular	Roper (voice)	Short
2023	Good Burger 2	Mr. Wheat	Voiceover Cameo
2025	Straw	Benny	

=== Television ===
Year	Title	Role	Notes
1986	The Redd Foxx Show	Bryon Lightfoot	Main cast
1987	The Cosby Show	Davis Sarrette	Episode: "Say Hello to a Good Buy"
1987–1991	A Different World	Coach Walter Oakes	Recurring cast: season 1, main cast: season 2–4
1992	Roc	Ruben Stiles	Episode: "Roc and the Actor"
1992	Saturday Night Live	Himself / Host	Episode: Sinbad/Sade
1993–1994	The Sinbad Show	David Bryan	Main cast
1994	Sesame Street	Himself	Episode: 3266
1995	The Puzzle Place	Himself	Episode: "Bully for Jody"
1995	All That	Himself	Episode: "Sinbad/Coolio"
1995–1999	Happily Ever After: Fairy Tales for Every Child	Frog Prince / Simpleton / Wolfgang (voice)	3 episodes
1997–1998	Vibe	Himself	Host
1998–1999	Cosby	Del	Recurring cast: season 3
2000	Moesha	Professor LeCount	Episode: "The Nutty Moesha"
2001	Girlfriends	Himself	Episode: "Jamaic-Up?"
2002	Resurrection Blvd.	Odell Mason	Supporting cast: season 3
2007–2009	Slacker Cats	Eddie (voice)	Main cast
2008	It's Always Sunny in Philadelphia	Himself	Episode: "Dennis Reynolds: An Erotic Life"
2008	Family Guy	Himself (voice)	Episode: "Tales of a Third Grade Nothing"
2011	Are We There Yet?	Judge Oakes	Episode: "The Whose Card Is It Anyway Episode"
2012	The Eric Andre Show	Himself	Episode: "Sinbad"
2013–2015	American Dad	Himself (voice)	3 episodes
2013–2014	Steven Universe	Mr. Smiley (voice)	Recurring cast: season 1
2015	Comedy Bang! Bang!	Noel DeSoil Holyfield	Episode: "Colin Hanks Wears a Denim Button Down and Black Sneakers"
2017	CollegeHumor Originals	Shazaam	Episode: "We Found Sinbad's SHAZAAM Genie Movie!"
2017	The Lion Guard	Uroho (voice)	2 episodes
2018–2019	Rel	Milton	Main cast
2022	Atlanta	Himself	Episode: "The Goof Who Sat By the Door "

== See also ==
- Mononymous person
