= American Dad! season 9 =

American Dad!
- Season 9
- Region 1 cover art for "Volume 9"
- Starring: Seth MacFarlane; Wendy Schaal; Scott Grimes; Rachael MacFarlane; Dee Bradley Baker
- No. of episodes: 19

Release
- Original network: Fox
- Original release: September 30, 2012 – May 12, 2013

Season chronology
- ← Previous; Season 8 Next → Season 10

The ninth season of the American TV series American Dad! originally aired on Fox on September 30, 2012, at 9:30/8:30c, and concluded on May 12, 2013, and consisted of 19 episodes. It was the last season to air while 20th Century Fox Television was still part of News Corporation, as on June 28, 2013, various entertainment assets of News Corporation were spun off into a new company called 21st Century Fox, with News Corporation retaining its print assets and Australian media assets.

Guest stars for the season include Wayne Brady, Alison Brie, Sean Hayes, Mariah Carey, Charlie Day, Michelle Dockery, Nathan Fillion, Will Forte, Sarah Michelle Gellar, Rupert Grint, Jon Hamm, and Shaun White.

Episode plots include Jeff discovering Roger is an alien and being stranded on an alien space ship in a two-episode story arc ("Naked to the Limit, One More Time", "Lost in Space"), Klaus finding his human body, then switching with Stan's ("Da Flippity Flop"), Roger becoming Stan's stepfather ("American Stepdad") and Hayley getting a job as a bar singer for Roger ("Love, AD Style").

The episode "Minstrel Krampus" was scheduled to air on December 16, 2012, but was replaced by a repeat of "Wheels & the Legman and the Case of Grandpa's Key" out of sensitivity for the Sandy Hook Elementary School shooting. To compensate for this, they aired the episode "National Treasure 4: Baby Franny: She's Doing Well: The Hole Story" early. "Minstrel Krampus" aired in the tenth season.

== Episodes ==
| No. overall | No. in season | Title | Directed by | Written by | Original release date | Prod. code | U.S. viewers (millions) |
|---|---|---|---|---|---|---|---|
| 134 | 1 | "Love, AD Style" | Josue Cervantes | Erik Durbin | September 30, 2012 | 7AJN03 | 5.25 |
In Jeff's absence, Roger develops a crush on Hayley after he recruits her as the main entertainer in his new crooner's bar, and ends up shooting her when she tells him that she cannot be in love with him because she is already married. In the hospital, Roger proceeds to kidnap the recovering Hayley to keep her for his own, then eventually believing that the only way to be close enough to her is to cut off her skin and drape it over him. Jeff returns in time to stop him, and they both make Roger realize that Hayley would never accept him because he is not her husband Jeff. In response, he cuts off Jeff's skin instead, much to Hayley's horror. By this time, Roger has all but lost interest in Hayley, calling back Steve's remark that it's just a crush, so he offers to return the skin back to its bloodied, yet still alive owner. Meanwhile, Stan (once again) tries to prove his manhood by negotiating a good price for an SUV he wants, and tries to sell his black SUV to get money for the new one, but ends up failing when his lawn-side car-show ends up killing the showgirl.
| 135 | 2 | "Killer Vacation" | Rodney Clouden | Rick Wiener & Kenny Schwartz | October 7, 2012 | 7AJN05 | 5.18 |
The Smith family's tropical vacation turns out to be anything but relaxing when Stan is assigned a mission to kill the activities director at their resort, whom his boss at the CIA insists is an ex-war criminal. Meanwhile, Hayley and Jeff try to revive their dead sex life and meet a swinger couple, Steve joins a British boy (guest star Rupert Grint) to find a nude beach, and Roger (posing as an old widow) falls for an old widower.
| 136 | 3 | "Can I Be Frank with You?" | Pam Cooke & Valerie Fletcher | Judah Miller | November 4, 2012 (Note: This episode was originally scheduled to air on October 21, 2012, but was preempted as a result of a rainout of NLCS Game 6) | 7AJN08 | 3.99 |
Francine fears that she and Stan are growing apart because he spends so much time hanging out with his buddies at the "CIA Chill Zone," so she poses as a man to get inside. Meanwhile, Steve and his friends are recruited to join a boy band and make a music video.
| 137 | 4 | "American Stepdad" | Shawn Murray | Jordan Blum & Parker Deay | November 18, 2012 | 7AJN10 | 4.21 |
Stan invites his mother to come live with the family after Stan's stepfather, Hercules, dies, and tensions rise when Roger is forced to share his attic with her, but the tension turns to romance when Roger marries Stan's mother. Meanwhile, Steve and his friends find a lost script to the seventh Fast and the Furious movie in a plane crash — and discover a shocking secret behind the franchise when they read it.
| 138 | 5 | "Why Can't We Be Friends?" | Jansen Yee | Jonathan Fener | December 2, 2012 | 7AJN06 | 4.25 |
Stan decides that Snot is not cool enough to be Steve's friend, so he attempts to separate them by staging a shooting at an ice cream parlor, of which Snot is the only witness and is then placed in the CIA Witness Protection program. Meanwhile, Roger hires Jeff to clean his attic for extra cash, but keeps robbing him every time he goes back to Hayley's room.
| 139 | 6 | "Adventures in Hayleysitting" | Tim Parsons & Jennifer Graves | Matt Fusfeld & Alex Cuthbertson | December 9, 2012 | 7AJN09 | 4.67 |
To prove she's responsible, Hayley and Jeff offers to babysit Steve after the regular babysitter ends up in the hospital with a broken leg.
| 140 | 7 | "National Treasure 4: Baby Franny: She's Doing Well: The Hole Story" | Chris Bennett | Murray Miller | December 23, 2012 | 7AJN04 | 4.21 |
When Greg and Terry's new talk show does a story on the 35th anniversary of the rescue of "Baby Franny," Francine begins to feel guilty over wasting her life while the fireman who rescued her died in her place — until she finds that the fireman is alive and has been living as a hermit in the well for years. Meanwhile, Stan and Roger team up with Toshi's dad to invent and market sexy shoes for male strippers.
| 141 | 8 | "Finger Lenting Good" | Joe Daniello | Laura McCreary | January 6, 2013 | 7AJN07 | 5.65 |
Francine encourages the family to give up their various vices for Lent (Stan's yelling, Steve's crying, Hayley's junk food snacking, Jeff's need to hug people, and Francine's smoking), but they all get drunk at Roger's Mardi Gras party and sign a pact letting Deputy Director Bullock stay over to make sure the Smith-Fishers stick to their sacrifices and amputate a finger from anybody who doesn't. Meanwhile, in a risqué parody of Cinderella, Roger finds a nipple pastie the morning after the Mardi Gras party and, along with Klaus, goes searching for the perfect bosom.
| 142 | 9 | "The Adventures of Twill Ongenbone and His Boy Jabari" | Josue Cervantes | Brian Boyle | January 13, 2013 | 7AJN11 | 4.82 |
Francine tries to teach Roger the value of hard work after his character "Twill Ongenbone" fakes a degree in archaeology. Meanwhile, Steve asks Stan some questions about his past, but ends up seeing a side of his father that frightens him and interests his friends.
| 143 | 10 | "Blood Crieth Unto Heaven" | Joe Daniello | Brian Boyle | January 27, 2013 | 7AJN15 | 4.27 |
In this parody of the Pulitzer Prize-winning stage play August: Osage County, Francine throws a birthday party for Stan, which brings back bad memories of when his father abandoned him. Meanwhile, Roger (playing a black maid named Edna) kills off the love child of Avery Bullock and Hayley.
| 144 | 11 | "Max Jets" | Tim Parsons & Jennifer Graves | Keith Heisler | February 10, 2013 | 7AJN17 | 3.88 |
A waitress gets her claws on Roger's philanthropic character Max Jets, who's just gotten out of prison and is helping the Smiths with their financial woes.
| 145 | 12 | "Naked to the Limit, One More Time" | Chris Bennett | Keith Heisler | February 17, 2013 | 7AJN12 | 4.15 |
Roger tries to convince Jeff that he's his imaginary friend so Roger can go naked in the house, but when Jeff eventually learns the truth, Stan must choose between killing Roger or killing Jeff so the secret can stay a secret. But Roger makes a choice that may effect the Smiths forever. Meanwhile, Steve feels left out when his friends get their adult butts, but he doesn't.
| 146 | 13 | "For Black Eyes Only" | Jansen Yee | Jonathan Fener | March 10, 2013 | 7AJN22 | 3.27 |
In this follow-up to season three's James Bond parody "Tearjerker," Sexpun T'Come (Francine) is killed by Black Villain (Principal Lewis) in a failed attempt to assassinate Stan, who must now team up with Tearjerker (Roger) to stop Black Villain's plan to melt the Arctic glaciers, even if it means going through a clone of Sexpun T'Come, who is black instead of white.
| 147 | 14 | "Spelling Bee My Baby" | Rodney Clouden | Lesley Wake Webster | March 24, 2013 | 7AJN13 | 4.53 |
Francine trains Steve for the school's spelling bee in order to give her son an edge over the other kids when they apply for college. Meanwhile, Roger and Stan try to help Hayley cope with losing Jeff by rushing her through the five stages of grief (denial, anger, bargaining, depression, and acceptance) so they can use her as a line judge for their badminton match.
| 148 | 15 | "The Missing Kink" | Pam Cooke & Valerie Fletcher | Jeff Chiang & Eric Ziobrowski | April 14, 2013 | 7AJN16 | 4.23 |
Francine wants Stan to be more sexually adventurous, but, after a lavish musical number by Roger, Stan becomes a sex freak. Meanwhile, in the continuing arc of Hayley missing her husband following his alien abduction, Hayley decides to get back in the dating world — and ends up going out with Snot, who has second thoughts about being with a lonely and willing Hayley.
| 149 | 16 | "The Boring Identity" | Jansen Yee | Erik Sommers | April 21, 2013 | 7AJN14 | 3.81 |
After the CIA discovers that Osama bin Laden is still alive and working at Doug and Buster's (a Dave and Buster's-style arcade and restaurant), Stan and his friends are assigned to take him out once and for all, but an accident during the raid gives Stan amnesia — and Francine the chance to turn the macho Stan into the mild-mannered husband she's always wanted. Meanwhile, Steve works a paper route so he can buy a soda machine, and Roger teaches Steve the unethical ways a paper boy can make extra money.
| 150 | 17 | "The Full Cognitive Redaction of Avery Bullock by the Coward Stan Smith" | Shawn Murray | Erik Durbin | April 28, 2013 | 7AJN18 | 4.03 |
CIA Internal Affairs tells Stan that Deputy Director Bullock is showing early signs of dementia and must have his memory erased. Meanwhile, Steve has bully problems once again, and enlists the help of Stan's old bully, Stelio Kantos.
| 151 | 18 | "Lost in Space" | Chris Bennett | Mike Barker | May 5, 2013 | 7AJN20 | 5.00 |
Months after the events on "Naked to the Limit, One More Time," Jeff—still on a spaceship owned by Roger's race of aliens that was originally intended to return Roger back to his birth planet—must prove to the emperor (voiced by Michael McKean) of the alien spaceship that he's truly in love with Hayley so as to get back to Earth.
| 152 | 19 | "Da Flippity Flop" | Rodney Clouden | Matt Weitzman | May 12, 2013 | 7AJN21 | 4.01 |
Klaus finds his human body and begs Stan to return him into it, but when the body turns out to be rotting (thanks to the CIA scientists using the ice for margaritas), Klaus knocks Stan out and puts his brain into Stan's body while Stan lives life as a fish. Meanwhile, Roger badgers Steve into joining his attic gym.
