= American Dad! season 10 =

American Dad!
- Season 10
- Region 1 cover art for "Volume 10"
- Starring: Seth MacFarlane; Wendy Schaal; Scott Grimes; Rachael MacFarlane; Dee Bradley Baker
- No. of episodes: 20

Release
- Original network: Fox
- Original release: September 29, 2013 – May 18, 2014

Season chronology
- ← Previous; Season 9 Next → Season 11

The tenth season of the animated television series American Dad! originally aired on Fox from September 29, 2013, to May 18, 2014, and consisted of twenty episodes. Created by Seth MacFarlane, Matt Weitzman, and Mike Barker, the series continues to focus on the misadventures of the eccentric upper middle class Smith family in a fictionalized version of Langley, Virginia. A subplot occurring simultaneously throughout the season follows Jeff, Hayley's husband, as he is sent to space in a previous episode. Season ten was the final full season to air on Fox, as the next is a mini-season only featuring three unaired episodes that Fox spontaneously aired.

On August 2, 2013, it was first announced that Mariah Carey would guest voice-star as a redneck character in the episode "Kung Pao Turkey". The heavily publicized episode aired on November 24, 2013. Also, the Christmas episode "Minstrel Krampus", which would have aired during the previous season but was cancelled due to the Sandy Hook Elementary School shooting, aired on December 15, 2013.

The show was initially airing in its usual timeslot of 9:30 PM Eastern. Beginning on March 16 and continuing for the rest of the season, American Dad! moved to 7:30 PM Eastern; the move came as a result of the addition of Cosmos: A Spacetime Odyssey to the network's lineup.

Guest voice actors for the season include Zooey Deschanel, Danny Glover, Chloë Grace Moretz, Mark Cuban, Olivia Wilde, Sinbad, Josh Groban, Alan Thicke, Robin Thicke, Gillian Jacobs, Terry Crews, Gary Busey, Mae Whitman, Pete Holmes, Diego Luna, Patrick Stewart, Alison Brie and Nancy Cartwright as Bart Simpson.

== Episodes ==
No. overall	No. in season	Title	Directed by	Written by	Original release date	Prod. code	U.S. viewers (millions)
153	1	"Steve & Snot's Test-Tubular Adventure"	Joe Daniello	Jordan Blum & Parker Deay	September 29, 2013	8AJN01	4.32
After failing to get dates for the high school prom, Steve and Snot try using the CIA's cloning machine to make dates, but the machine produces two fast-growing newborn babies, forcing the boys to father them in time for the prom. Meanwhile, Stan takes home the CIA's cloned pet dodo with disastrous consequences.
154	2	"Poltergasm"	Pam Cooke & Valerie Fletcher	Matt McKenna	October 6, 2013	8AJN02	4.47
In a spoof of the movie Poltergeist, the Smith home is haunted by Francine's unsatisfied sexual drive every time she is left having to fake it, so it is up to Roger – as medium Ruby Zeldastein – to eliminate the ghost. Meanwhile, Hayley dates a young, Hispanic man named Mauricio, and Klaus goes to Atlantic City for a self-help seminar, but ends up breaking his back and forced to watch the hotel guide channel in his room.
155	3	"Buck, Wild"	Josue Cervantes	Brett Cawley & Robert Maitia	November 3, 2013	8AJN05	3.75
In order to prove his manhood, Steve accompanies Stan and his CIA buddies on their hunting trip, while Roger and Klaus embark on a cross-country trek.
156	4	"Crotchwalkers"	Tim Parsons & Jennifer Graves	Dan Vebber	November 10, 2013	8AJN03	3.55
Just to show Steve she is still a "cool" mom, Francine teaches him various shoplifting techniques at the local mall "The Gash". However, their efforts to pull off the ultimate heist result in Steve getting captured and sent to a Venezuelan sweatshop. Meanwhile, Roger, Hayley and Klaus become Langley Falls' first Russian balalaika trio and Stan injures his groin (just as he did in "A Smith in the Hand") and must use a whiteboard to communicate.
157	5	"Kung Pao Turkey"	Rodney Clouden	Erik Richter	November 24, 2013	8AJN07	3.86
Stan's plans for watching football on Thanksgiving in his underwear are ruined by Francine inviting her adoptive parents over for the holiday. Meanwhile, Francine's mom encourages Hayley (who is still single following Jeff's abduction by aliens) to date again, but her true intentions are revealed at the dinner table.
158	6	"Independent Movie"	Shawn Murray	Judah Miller	December 1, 2013	8AJN04	3.50
Steve and his friends embark on an epic cross-country road trip to the funeral of Snot's father so that Snot can confront his emotions. However, Snot has no interest in meeting his deceased father, who abandoned him after he was born. Steve's commitment to his friends is put to the test when he falls for a quirky girl. Meanwhile, Stan and Roger invent an automatic cake-cutter with the help of Hideki's investments for the Home Shopping Network, but their partnership is jeopardized by their "verbal agreement" on how to split the profits.
159	7	"Faking Bad"	Jansen Yee	John Unholz	December 8, 2013	8AJN08	4.36
In this parody of Breaking Bad, Hayley tries to fit in with her old high school friends and discovers Steve's talent for creating fake IDs that can easily be passed for real ones. Seeing this as a business opportunity, Hayley builds out Steve's operation, but find themselves up against another fake ID kingpin in Langley Falls: Kevin Ramage (another of Roger's disguises).
160	8	"Minstrel Krampus"	Josue Cervantes	Murray Miller & Judah Miller	December 15, 2013 (Note: This episode was originally scheduled to air on December 16, 2012 as part of its ninth season, but was pulled from its planned airing as a result of the Sandy Hook Elementary School shooting that occurred two days prior.)	7AJN19	5.00
A notorious Christmas demon known as Minstrel Krampus kidnaps a bratty Steve, so Stan and Roger must travel to the North Pole to save him with the help of Stan's estranged father. Meanwhile, Hayley takes a job at the airport to get her family Christmas presents.
161	9	"Vision: Impossible"	Pam Cooke & Valerie Fletcher	Ali Waller	January 5, 2014	8AJN10	5.03
A car accident gives Roger the power to foresee the future, causing the Smiths to pester him with questions of what will happen.
162	10	"Familyland"	Joe Daniello	Joe Chandler & Nic Wegener	January 12, 2014	8AJN09	4.47
At Francine's insistence, the Smiths go on vacation at a Disneyland-esque theme park called Familyland. Unfortunately, the visit turns disastrous when Roger, Hayley, Stan and Steve all separate to go to different regions of the park. Francine, disappointed in how the park broke up her family, complains in front of a statue of the park's founder Roy Family. As Francine walks off with Klaus, the statue begins to cry and eventually crack revealing the original Roy Family inside. Roy, angry at how his park has failed to be a good influence over families, decides to shut down the park and lock in all visitors. After one week, each member of the Smith family carves out their own personal "kingdom" out of the park while Francine struggles to find a way to end the chaos.
163	11	"Cock of the Sleepwalk"	Shawn Murray	Brian Boyle	January 26, 2014	8AJN12	3.30
After Stan completes his 100th kill, he accidentally releases a benevolent persona of himself while sleeping, and this new incarnation goes on a spree of doing good deeds that the real Stan would never undertake.
164	12	"Introducing the Naughty Stewardesses"	Josue Cervantes	Judah Miller	March 16, 2014	8AJN13	2.71
In a parody of Face/Off, Roger switches faces with Steve to help him win over the hot girl at school, but soon decides he wants her for himself – until the girl reveals that she is pregnant with her jock ex-boyfriend's baby. Meanwhile, in a parody of Charlie's Angels, Stan and Francine's vacation to Sacramento gets sidetracked when they befriend a quartet of sexy stewardesses and go undercover to help them thwart Mark Cuban's plan to blow up the sun.
165	13	"I Ain't No Holodeck Boy"	Jansen Yee	Matt McKenna	March 23, 2014	8AJN16	2.70
Against Francine's wishes, Stan takes Steve and his friends into the woods for some outdoor playtime, where they wind up on the CIA's holodeck. Meanwhile, Hayley claims she is Roger's queen after purchasing his home star on an International Star Registry.
166	14	"Stan Goes on the Pill"	Chris Bennett	Brett Cawley & Robert Maitia	March 30, 2014	8AJN14	2.79
Unable to listen to Francine's constant chatting, Stan takes an experimental estrogen pill which allows him to be able to listen to women without zoning out. Things get complicated, however, when Stan's dosage turns him into a woman and Avery Bullock begins making romantic advances towards the now-female Stan. Meanwhile, Roger and Klaus start their own business selling the suits Stan wore as a male, which doesn't go according to plan.
167	15	"Honey, I'm Homeland"	Tim Parsons & Jennifer Graves	Dan Vebber	April 6, 2014	8AJN11	2.68
Stan infiltrates an Occupy Wall Street protest and ends up being kidnapped and brainwashed. Meanwhile, Roger buys thousands of candles and is unable to sell them, resulting in him and Steve getting carried away while giving each other massages in the attic in an attempt to use them all up.
168	16	"She Swill Survive"	Chris Bennett	Rick Singer	April 13, 2014	8AJN06	2.36
Stan fears that Hayley has no life skills, so he forces her to take a job as a bartender in Roger's attic in order to make money for rent. However, when Bullock becomes Hayley's best customer, Stan realizes that he can use his daughter's knowledge to get ahead at work. Meanwhile, Steve and Snot watch Das Boot with Klaus, only for Klaus to realize they cannot fully appreciate the movie without telling them every German story that the movie references, much to the boys' annoyance.
169	17	"Rubberneckers"	Rodney Clouden	Joe Chandler & Nic Wegener	April 27, 2014	8AJN15	2.40
In this partial musical episode, Stan's newfound talent of checking out women on the sly leads to an auto accident, and a tough insurance agent threatens to rat him out to Francine. Meanwhile, after spilling wine on the new couch, Roger and Klaus come up with a far-fetched plan to keep from being caught.
170	18	"Permanent Record Wrecker"	Tim Parsons & Jennifer Graves	Brian Boyle	May 4, 2014	8AJN19	2.51
CIA budget cuts leave Stan out in the cold, and since his company work record is classified, his only employment opportunity is at a local grocery store that is managed by Steve. Meanwhile, Roger and an annoying coffee-shop musician (guest voiced by Robin Thicke) engage in a wager that leads Roger into a Faustian pact with an infomercial guitar instructor.
171	19	"News Glance with Genevieve Vavance"	Shawn Murray	Ali Waller	May 11, 2014	8AJN20	2.40
Hayley starts an internship at a local news station under Genevieve Vavance, a Nancy Grace-type reporter who turns out to be Roger in disguise. Meanwhile, Steve pretends to be missing after his sex-ed teacher reads his embarrassing question during a Q&A session, which Hayley and Roger (as Genevieve) manipulate into a far-fetched kidnapping story.
172	20	"The Longest Distance Relationship"	Pam Cooke & Valerie Fletcher	Jordan Blum & Parker Deay	May 18, 2014	8AJN18	2.36
Hayley is still heartbroken and trying to get over Jeff's abduction, and meets a millionaire named Matt, who helps her deal with the tragedy. However, Steve and Snot discover that Jeff is alive and, along with the ghost of Sinbad, is trying to make his way back to her. Ultimately, Jeff learns that by the time he can make it back to Earth, Hayley will be sixty and would have spent her entire life waiting for him. He goes back in time through the wormhole that he used to enter into Earth, and tells Hayley that he isn't sure if he can make it back to Earth after all, and that he wants her to move on. She accepts, saying she will never forget him, and goes to begin life with Matt, only for him to be killed by Roger upon finding out he is an alien.
