= Da Flippity Flop =

- American Dad! episode
- Episode no.: Season 9 Episode 19
- Directed by: Rodney Clouden
- Written by: Matt Weitzman
- Production code: 7AJN21
- Original air date: May 11, 2013

Guest appearances
- Shaun White as himself; Jonny Moseley as himself

Episode chronology
← Previous "Lost in Space"	Next → "Steve & Snot's Test-Tubular Adventure"
- American Dad! season 9

"Da Flippity Flop" is the nineteenth episode and the season finale of the ninth season of American Dad!, as well as the 152nd episode of the series. The episode aired in the United States on May 12, 2013, on Fox's Animation Domination lineup. It was written by series co-creator Matt Weitzman and directed by Rodney Clouden.

The episode centers on Klaus Heisler swapping bodies with Stan Smith after Klaus is unable to retrieve his human body, and Stan must find a way to regain control of his body before Klaus ruins it. A subplot involves Roger renovating the Smiths' attic into a health club and attempting to pressure Steve into a long-term membership.

== Plot ==
Klaus Heisler, the Smiths' man-in-a-fish-body pet, learns that his long lost original (human) body has been discovered and stored frozen by the CIA (Stan's place of employment). Excited by the idea of finally being able to ski jump again and pull off his famous stunt he never got to perform, dubbed "Da Flippity Flop", Klaus begs Stan to help him retrieve the body. However, Stan is less than willing to help. Depressed by Stan's reluctance, Klaus attempts suicide multiple times, but fails. Eventually, Francine manages to convince Stan to return Klaus into his human body. While at the CIA, Klaus and Stan discover several lab technicians have unfrozen Klaus' human body, using the ice to cool their alcoholic beverages. Consequently, the human body has severely decayed and rotted. An irate Klaus blames Stan for not getting to the CIA sooner and knocks Stan out with a blender. While Stan is unconscious, Klaus swaps bodies with him. When Stan awakens, he finds himself in Klaus's fish body and Klaus in his human body. Stan angrily demands Klaus to return him into his human body, but Klaus refuses.

Although Klaus attempts to impersonate Stan, Hayley and Francine instantly realize the essence of Klaus is inside Stan's human body running it. However, Francine and Hayley suddenly break out in laughter and express complete amusement by the whole state of affairs, though they also let Klaus know that they want the switch to be short-lived. Klaus agrees but tells Stan in secret that he'll never undo the switch. Klaus then goes on revenge-filled adventures, in which he repeatedly abuses Stan's human body. His unsanitary escapades consist of smoking cigarettes, playing with dead animals, sleeping around with diseased hookers without protection, and getting high on heroin while a homeless addict takes the needle out, uses it, and puts it back in his arm. Throughout each of the unsanitary acts, Klaus carries an outraged and appalled Stan around in a fishbowl.

Stan protests that Klaus is abusing his body, and Francine and Hayley believe him after Klaus reveals the risque tattoo of an elephant he recently got. Klaus then decamps to do his ski jump. Stan realizes he has no other choice but to enter Klaus's original, now decayed human body to try to stop Klaus from further defilement and wreckage of his human body. The family pursues Klaus to a ski resort, where Stan and Klaus do battle on a hill. After further battle with Klaus, the decayed body becomes even more ravaged than before. Stan forces Klaus into a tree, in effect breaking the leg of his own body. The rest of the skiers and visitors are shocked by the ravaged and decayed body housing the essence of Stan. Stan then lands himself into a situation where he's forced to pull off a ski jump of his own. Stan manages some air-time and pulls off Da Flippity Flop within the rotted body, which pleases Klaus. However, Stan then lands brutally, in the process destroying Klaus's original body. Francine and Hayley manage to get Stan back into his regular body and Klaus back into the goldfish body. Stan acknowledges Klaus has had a harsh life and apologizes for leaving Klaus as a goldfish for so long. Stan promises to find a body so the Klaus could be human again but he blatantly admits he'll probably never switch him back into a human body.

Meanwhile, Steve finds a brochure for Roger's new health club with Roger attempting to coax him to join. Roger leaves him dozens of answering machine messages, where he attempts to persuade Steve to join. Steve confronts Roger over the calls and tiredly agrees to a month's membership. As Steve finally starts to warm up to his membership, he finds that Roger has changed the attic again to a Chinese restaurant and has given Steve a new job as a bicycle delivery boy.

== Reception ==
In its original airing, "Da Flippity Flop" attracted 4.01 million U.S. viewers. It was the third highest rated show on Fox that night, beating out the Bob's Burgers third season finale, but losing to new episodes of The Simpsons and Family Guy. Critical reception for "Da Flippity Flop" was generally positive. Kevin McFarland of The A.V. Club gave the episode a B+ and noted: "This season finale of American Dad is a perfect example of how the show has settled into being above-average nearly every week, with the occasional ability to hit above or below that mark." Robert H. Dawson of TV Equals gave a generally positive review, praising the silly humor, but criticizing the overuse of gross-out gags. He noted: "What matters is the episode at hand, and in this case, it was a pretty good, if an unexceptional one."
