= The Missing Kink =

- American Dad! episode
- Episode no.: Season 9 Episode 15
- Directed by: Pam Cooke; Valerie Fletcher
- Written by: Jeff Chiang; Eric Ziobrowski
- Production code: 7AJN16
- Original air date: April 14, 2013

Episode chronology
← Previous "Spelling Bee My Baby"	Next → "The Boring Identity"
- American Dad! season 9

"The Missing Kink" is the fifteenth episode of the ninth season and the 148th overall episode of the animated comedy series American Dad!. It aired on Fox in the United States on April 14, 2013, and is written by Jeff Chiang and Eric Ziobrowski and directed by Pam Cooke and Valerie Fletcher.

In the episode, unsatisfied with missionary sex, Francine finds out she has a spanking fetish when Stan tries to punish Steve. Meanwhile, Hayley tries to move on from Jeff being sent into outer space and agrees to go out on a date with Snot.

== Plot ==
After the usual missionary position sex, Francine admits being bored and suggests some variations but Stan insists it is the natural way to have sex. Steve angers Stan at breakfast and receives a spanking. Francine objects and Stan demonstrates for her how he spanks to prove it does no lasting harm, but Francine finds it turns her on. Chatting with Roger, Francine asks how to approach Stan with her turn-on and Roger suggests she trick him. She uses an argument between Steve and Klaus as a pretense to get Stan to spank her again and agrees to take all of his spankings in the future resulting in a montage of incidents.

Stan finally catches her tossing Steve's bicycle through the front window and decides to banish Francine to the woods as per a fake verse in his Bible as punishment. After two days in the woods, Stan returns but finds Francine is unrepentant and accuses Stan of being repressed. She refuses to leave until Stan opens up a bit. Later with Roger, Stan continues to call her a deviant and Roger convinces him to open up with a musical number, although Stan finds he wants to embrace every kink known to Roger's dread. Stan finds Francine and surprises her with a spanking and an openness to try new things, although even Francine gets reservations when Stan gets too weird. At home, Francine finds that Stan has arranged an audience while they make kinky love. Francine goes to Roger and admits she created a monster.

Roger intervenes in a latex wetsuit and horrifies everyone including Stan back to normal. Francine makes up with Stan in the hospital while Roger is inside of Stan's body. To get her spanking fix, Francine joins a women's softball team, where the teammates spank Francine in celebration for good plays on field. Meanwhile, Snot decides to take advantage of Hayley's grief over Jeff and asks her out. To his surprise she agrees. After a date with Snot, Hayley returns in a good mood, but Snot finds he was only aroused by the pursuit of Hayley; now that he has her, he is no longer interested. Steve confronts Snot and asks him to avoid breaking Hayley's heart. Snot decides to confess to being gay with Barry and Hayley decides to bow out, leaving Barry heartbroken when Snot leaves him as well.

== Reception ==
Rob H. Dawson of TV Equals gave the episode a positive review, saying "It’s also nice to see an attempt at a multi-episode plot, the kind of thing American Dad usually doesn’t go for. We’re still dealing with Jeff’s absence, and although it’s in a less direct way this episode, it’s an interesting choice for the show to keep it on our minds. I would have liked if they hadn’t roped in Snot, however, because his character has never felt to me like anything worth spending time on. The one good moment here was in the end, when Barry manically latched onto Snot’s "I’m gay" ruse. Something about his delivery on those lines ("THIS IS WHAT HE LIKES!") sold it to me. But that was a minor thread in "The Missing Kink," an episode that, barring one big, singing exception, kept up the funny for most of its running time."

Kevin McFarland of The A.V. Club gave the episode a B, saying "It’s still fun to laugh at Stan for his strict conservative ways, but I’m glad that American Dad doles this type of story out in smaller parcels than it used to. It especially helps to pair Stan with someone else in the family trying to soften him, and Francine’s futile quest to introduce more adventure into their bedroom certainly combats Stan’s uptight, Bible-misquoting ways in a way that creates room for a lot of jokes. "The Missing Kink" may end in an unsatisfying way, returning to the same boring Smith sex life, but with Francine indulging elsewhere, but it still contains enough laughs and outlandish visuals to outshine the rough patches." The episode was watched by a total of 4.23 million people, this made it the second most watched show on Animation Domination that night, beating The Cleveland Show, Bob's Burgers and The Simpsons but losing to Family Guy with 5.02 million.
