= Joe Daniello =

American animation director

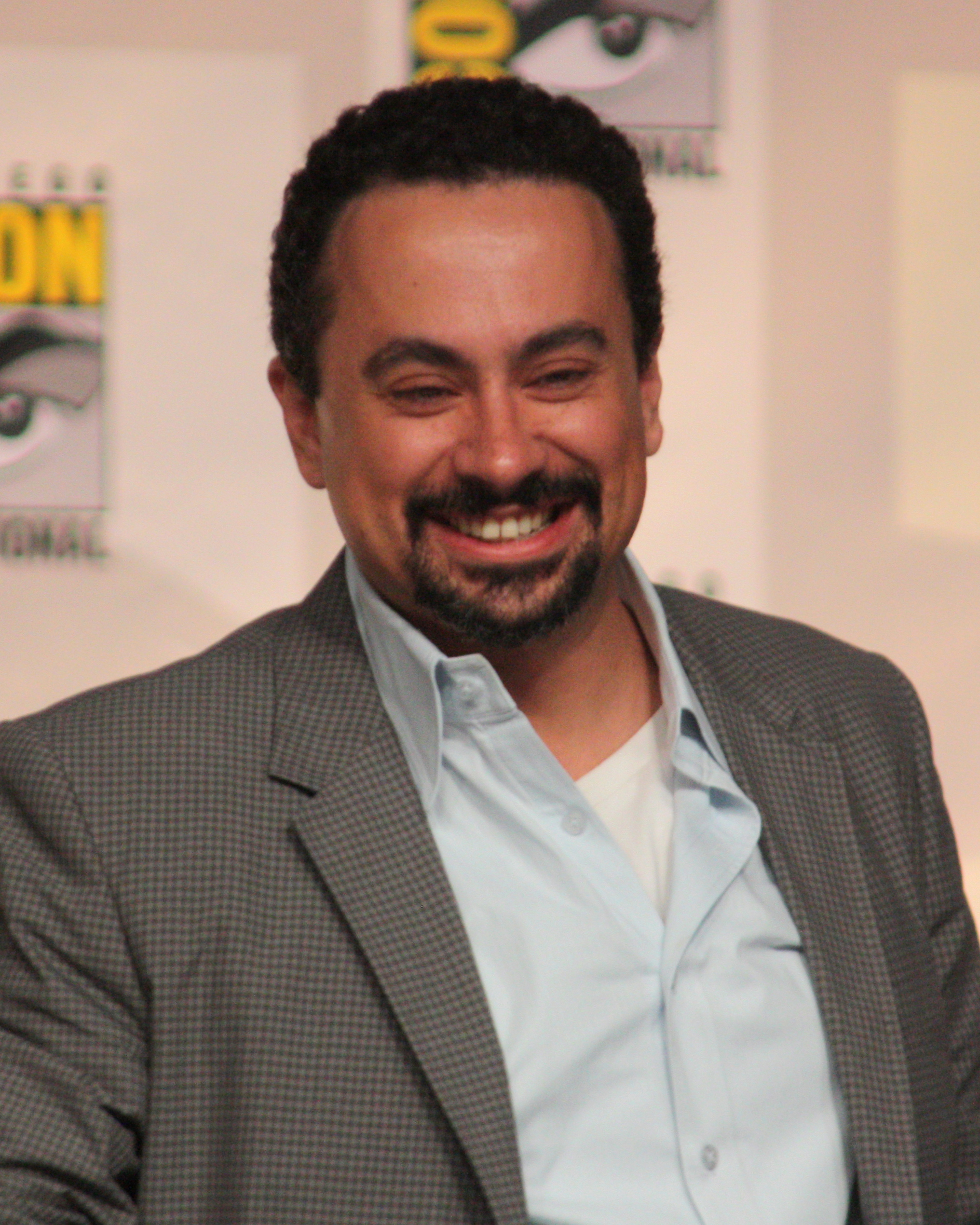
- Joe Daniello at the 2009 San Diego Comic-Con
- Born: Joseph Daniello
- Occupations: Director, storyboard artist
- Years active: 1997-present

Joseph Daniello is an American animation director. He directed several episodes of the television series American Dad!. Daniello has also worked as a storyboard artist for multiple animated television shows, including Invader Zim, The Fairly OddParents, ChalkZone and CatDog.

Daniello's name appears on a Jack Daniel's-like liquor bottle in American Dad! S07E08 and again in S08E08.
