= Hayley Smith (American Dad!) =

Fictional character from American Dad!

- American Dad! character
- First appearance: "Pilot" (2005)
- Created by: Seth MacFarlane; Mike Barker; Matt Weitzman
- Designed by: Seth MacFarlane
- Voiced by: Rachael MacFarlane

In-universe information
- Full name: Hayley Dreamsmasher Smith
- Nickname: Babe (by Jeff)
- Occupation: Student at Groff Community College; Fast food worker at Sub Hub
- Family: Stan Smith (father); Francine Smith (mother); Steve Smith (brother); Roger Smith (alien housemate); Klaus Heisler (talking goldfish, friend); Rogu (Roger’s son)
- Spouse: Jeff Fischer (m. 2010)
- Religion: Episcopalian, Atheism
- Home: Langley Falls, Virginia
- Nationality: American
- Age: 19

Hayley Dreamsmasher Smith is a fictional character from the animated television series American Dad!. She is voiced by Rachael MacFarlane, the younger sister of one of the series' co-creators, Seth MacFarlane. She is Stan and Francine Smith's 19-year-old daughter and Steve's older sister.

Hayley, along with her father Stan, was one of the first two characters who were conceived and created for the series. Across the series, Hayley's storylines typically involve her liberal opinions clashing with her father's staunch conservative beliefs, and her on-again-off-again relationship with boyfriend Jeff Fischer, whom she marries in the show's sixth season.

== Biography ==
Hayley Smith is the daughter of Stan Smith and Francine Smith, (although it is later revealed that Stan may not be her biological father, but this is one of the three episodes that contradict several others). It is revealed in a brief flashback that she had a twin brother named Bailey. Unlike her father, her mother and her brother, Steve Smith, Hayley is ultra-liberal. She is addicted to marijuana and in "Jones for a Smith," Hayley actually worries that her marijuana smoking is getting out of hand and begs Francine to let her go to rehab, with Francine callously telling her daughter to stop being such a melodramatic attention-seeker. Hayley once helped the homeless, and is in favor of gun control. This causes a great amount of distrust and hatred for her on Stan's part, as he consistently has views that are polar opposite to hers. In the third-season episode "Stanny Slickers II: The Legend of Ollie's Gold", it is revealed that her middle name is Dreamsmasher, as given by Stan.

She lives with her parents and goes to Groff Community College, though she moved out temporarily after a bitter argument with Stan. As a college student, Hayley also majors in women's studies and promotes women's rights.

== Personality ==
Hayley is Stan and Francine's new-age hippie daughter who, despite being a married adult for much of the series, still lives under her parents' roof along with her husband, Jeff. As revealed in the episode "The Kidney Stays in the Picture", she may or may not be Stan's biological daughter—Francine revealed to have cheated on Stan at a bachelorette party. Nonetheless, Stan still regards her as such. Hayley is passionate, insistent and vocal in her convictions. In mentality, she's portrayed as a passionate liberal, what was originally intended to be the antithesis to her father's conservatism. These character traits were particularly emphasized in the show's beginnings but heavily toned down afterwards. Intuitive and insightful, Hayley is able to instinctively grasp the hidden, inner, and obscure nature of situations. For example, she is able to see through Stan's disguise as a Russian communist to get her to come home in the episode "Stan Knows Best", and also, instantly upon entering the room in the episode "Finger Lenting Good", she realizes what Stan and Steve are up to in trying to get Jeff to hug them so as to lose his finger for engaging in his [Jeff] vice. As another example, in the episode "Da Flippity Flop" when the essence of Klaus has entered Stan's body and taken control over it, he attempts to deceive Hayley and Francine into thinking he's truly Stan; however, Hayley instantaneously and half-heartedly acknowledges that it's Klaus. At times, Hayley is casually rude and insulting in attitude especially towards her brother, Steve, which can be described as sibling rivalry. This is primarily because of Hayley's disgust for Steve's obnoxious tendencies and generally shallow taste and desire towards the opposite sex. Several story arcs have been about Hayley's romantic relationship with Jeff. Back when the two were dating, they had several breakups. Hayley is often the most empathetic member of her family. She helped to unionize the homeless men Stan paid to fight each other, helped free foster children that Roger had enslaved, and is the one most likely to stand up for people's rights when her family tries to exploit people. Nevertheless, she is also sometimes seen as hypocritical and has moments of weakness—for example, in "Camp Refoogee" she went to an African refugee camp and swore to help the starving people during the short time she expected to be there. However, after finding out they would be there for a few weeks, she went to the spa-like U.N. aid base and went so far as to eat steak, despite being a vegetarian (The episode, "The Longest Distance Relationship", she eats part of a steak, and in "N.S.A. (No Snoops Allowed)", she went an entire day eating just meat after she ate some by mistake). She is often disrespected by other more shallow and self-involved members of the household who seem to find her annoying and are contemptuous of her kinder and more selfless character, especially Stan and Roger.

The fourth season has started showing that Hayley is often prone to violent and uncontrollable mood swings. During puberty, she went through violent outbursts during every development, such as having to wear tampons (and ruining the family's white couch by sitting on it while wearing a skirt), being disappointed over how small her breasts were when they finished growing, and getting an enormous pimple. These mood swings terrified her parents and they were fearful of the same problems in her brother, although it is shown Steve has had his temper more under control. Another episode revealed that Hayley flies into a rage when men break up with her. It had gotten to the point where Hayley will have to go to jail if another relationship she has falls apart.

While still the most empathetic and possibly most sensible member of the Smith family, Hayley's generally intelligent and independent character becomes more at doubt in later seasons. Even upon moving back under her parents' roof, she is no longer an official student at Groff and once even claims that she always drops back out before term papers can happen and once even hinted that she planned on freeloading off her parents into her adult years. At this point in later seasons, Hayley's morality, sensibility, and seriousness have become much further in comparison to the rest of her more shallow, reckless, and muddled family members, and even Roger.

In "The Kidney Stays in the Picture", when Hayley needs a kidney transplant after drinking more liquor than she can handle, Stan immediately volunteers to have his kidney surgically removed to save Hayley. Francine greatly admires Stan's dedication to Hayley, but sheepishly admits Stan's transplant might result in organ rejection as she is unsure if Stan is Hayley's true father. Stan and Francine go back in time, and it is never revealed who Hayley's real father is as Stan requested that his kidney be taken out regardless and the doctors perform the transplant without revealing which kidney is used. The other potential father to Hayley is Joel Larson, a complete stranger who Francine slept with three days before she and Stan got married. When the doctor asked how they got the other kidney for Hayley, Stan said, " I called in a favour." It was later revealed that Roger cut into Larson's stomach with a keyhole saw, getting the kidney.

In season 5 episode 15 "Merlot Down Dirty Shame" it is revealed she and Klaus also share a telepathic ability to communicate. They can talk to each other with their thoughts.

== Voice actors ==
According to a DVD special on the creation of American Dad, Laura Prepon was initially chosen to play Hayley, but Prepon was dropped and replaced by Rachael MacFarlane, the younger sister of Seth MacFarlane.

In the French version of the show, the character is dubbed by Edwige Lemoine, the sister of Christophe Lemoine who dubbed the character of Eric Cartman from South Park.

== Romance ==
Hayley has a husband named Jeff, who is a vegetarian as well. Hayley did once move out, to move in with Jeff who it turns out lives in his van. They sometimes go hiking and smoke marijuana together. She once dumped Jeff, because he agrees with everything that she says. During this time, she slept with Stan's boss, Deputy-Director Bullock, a conservative. This happened after they had an argument; he apologized and she ended up sleeping with him at his house. At first, Stan ignored their relationship and decided it was a great chance to be promoted to "Deputy-Deputy Director". Hayley later dumped Bullock before announcing Stan's promotion. Bullock learned that a more assertive Jeff came back into her life. Being upset, Bullock promised Stan the promotion if he killed Jeff. Stan didn't kill Jeff but ended up battling his boss upon him insulting Hayley. Bullock gave Stan the job before Stan finished him off. Jeff disappeared for a time after "Phantom of the Telethon," where he was performing hacky-sack tricks on-stage at a telethon when a boat, pushed by Roger, fell on him.

Reginald, a talking koala who works for the CIA, befriends Hayley in the episode "Family Affair". She starts to develop an attraction to Reginald but is rejected by him as he reveals he has a girlfriend. She respects him, but she leaves an open-ended offer for Reginald by the end of the episode.

Embarrassed, she apologizes to Reginald in "Cops and Roger" and suggests a double date with him and his girlfriend Rhonda and her (temporary) boyfriend, Ian. The date ends up annoying both Ian and Rhonda as Reginald and Hayley continue to openly flirt with each other, and by the end of the episode, both end up leaving their partners in favour of each other.

Jeff returns to serenade Hayley in "100 A.D." and is shooed away by Stan and Francine for not being good enough for their daughter. However, after Jeff goes to Hayley and confesses his love for her, they decide to elope. They then trick Stan and Francine into giving them $50,000, which they spent trying to escape from Roger who was trying to steal it from them.

Hayley and Jeff reunite with the family in the episode "There Will Be Bad Blood" where they encounter the rest of the family freezing to death in the desert. Hayley reveals that shortly after losing Roger, the two tried to earn money with Jeff as a male prostitute, but finding little work with women, Jeff is forced into gay prostitution, putting him on "butt rest". They move back in with the Smith family in that same episode. In "Less Money, Mo' Problems" Hayley and Jeff are shown to be still living in the Smith household, with Jeff constantly annoying Stan with his habits. At the end of the episode, Stan has a change of heart after he sees how hard it would be for them to make it on the salary Jeff brings in.

Jeff becomes tricked by Roger in "Naked to the Limit, One More Time" that Roger is his new imaginary friend. But when Roger accidentally reveals that he is real, Jeff cannot keep the secret and Stan is forced to kill either Roger or Jeff. Both are saved when Roger offers to return to his home planet instead. On the night that the spaceship comes to pick up Roger, he tosses Jeff in the transport beam instead of himself and Jeff is abducted.

Hayley is shown pining and grieving over Jeff's disappearance and supposed death in "Spelling Bee My Baby", but in order for her to serve as a line judge, Stan and Roger try to fast track her through the grieving process, but in the end she blames them and steals their shuttlecock in retaliation, forcing Roger to go through the grieving process instead.

Jeff appears to return from space in the episode "Holy Shit, Jeff's Back!," but it is then revealed that the real Jeff Fischer was killed by a race of aliens called the Collectors, and this Jeff is a Collector named Zebleer. However, at the end of the episode, the Collectors are willing to put Jeff's brain in Zebleer to make Hayley happy. However, before they leave, Hayley and Stan had their memories wiped, so they don't know about Jeff's true nature.

There have been multiple scenes that allude to Hayley being bisexual. In the episode "Haylias", there's a scene where Hayley tells her parents that she's planning to leave the United States to go to France to live a more uninhibited life as well as engage in a string of wild love affairs, including one with a woman named Simone. Additionally, In the episode "Pulling Double Booty", she suggests that she and her then boyfriend, Stan's body double, Bill, have a threesome with their waitress. In Season 12, Jeff and Hayley try to have a child and it is revealed that Jeff is not human. After Roger agrees to carry Jeff as a surrogate mother so he can be reborn as a human, Jeff gets reborn through Roger and is human once again. But, due to how difficult Roger was during the pregnancy, Hayley feels that she isn't ready for a baby and Jeff agrees, having just been born himself.

Snot in the episode Jenny Fromdabloc appears to have a crush on Hayley since he was four or five. It is clear that Snot still has feelings for Hayley as the episode Jenny Fromdabloc shows as Snot becomes a teenager. Hayley rejects him multiple times in this episode, but in the episode The Missing Kink, Hayley realizes that Snot loves her and opens her heart to him for the first time. But Snot rejects because he realizes he loved her when he pursued her and she rejected him so, he fakes being gay with Barry in The Missing Kink! Hayley then, feels awkward about the situation and says "I had no idea!" and moves on from Snot. Snot and Hayley don't communicate after this episode as their affair is over.
