= 2011 in animation =

2011 in animation is an overview of notable events, including notable awards, list of films released, television show debuts and endings, and notable deaths.

== Events ==
=== January ===
- January 1: The first episode of Dan Vs. airs.
- January 3: The first episode of Wild Kratts airs on PBS Kids Go!, later on PBS Kids.
- January 7: Puella Magi Madoka Magica premieres on MBS (and later TBS and CBC), receiving widespread acclaim audiences and critics for its beautifully dark, boundary-pushing reinvention of the magical girl subgenre and becoming one of the greatest anime series of the 2010s and of all time. (Note: Attributed to multiple sources:)
- January 9: The first episode of Bob's Burgers aired.
- January 14: The first episode of Ninjago airs on Cartoon Network.
- January 24: The first episode of Bubble Guppies airs on Nickelodeon.

=== February ===
- February 11:
  - Entertainment One Films' Gnomeo & Juliet premieres.
  - Phineas and Ferb concludes its second season on Disney Channel with the premiere of the episodes "Make Play/Candace Gets Busted".
- February 14: Disney Junior launches as Disney Channel's new preschool block after Playhouse Disney was shut down.
- February 27: 83rd Academy Awards:
  - Toy Story 3 by Lee Unkrich wins the Academy Award for Best Animated Feature. The song We Belong Together by Randy Newman from the same movie wins the Academy Award for Best Original Song.
  - The Lost Thing by Andrew Ruhemann and Shaun Tan wins the Academy Award for Best Animated Short Film.

=== March ===
- March 4:
  - Paramount Pictures and Nickelodeon's Rango premieres. The movie gained controversy in California for the depictions of smoking in a children's movie. It was petitioned to receive an R rating, but failed to so. Further tobacco depictions would be phased out from the subsequent family-friendly films because of it.
  - Season 3 of Phineas and Ferb begins on Disney Channel with the premiere of the episodes "The Great Outdoors/Canderemy". The premiere of the season brought in a total of over 3.3 million viewers that night.
- March 11: Walt Disney Pictures and ImageMovers Digital's Mars Needs Moms is released, the film will become a major box-office bomb.
- March 13: The first episode of BoBoiBoy airs.
- March 22: The film Rio is released.
- March 23: Sym-Bionic Titan is canceled after 20 episodes due to low merchandise sales and series creator Genndy Tartakovsky leaving Cartoon Network to work with Sony Pictures Animation.
- March 26: The first episode of Larva airs.

=== April ===
- April 1: Illumination's live-action/animated film, Hop is released.
- April 3:
  - Tiger & Bunny premieres on Tokyo MX (with subsequent broadcasts on BS11 and MBS), instantly winning over critics and audiences with its refreshing, corporate-sponsored buddy-cop dynamic and becoming one of the standout superhero anime hits of the decade.
  - Nichijou premieres on TV Aichi (and later across independent regional networks), gradually overcoming mixed reviews from critics to earn a passionate cult following as one of the finest and most masterfully animated surreal comedies of all time. (Note: Attributed to multiple sources:)
- April 4: Cartoon Network's infamous program The Problem Solverz premieres, which received extremely negative reviews for its intense visual designs as the program was removed from the channel's schedule shortly after one season.
- April 6: Steins;Gate premieres on Tokyo MX (and later across independent UHF stations in Japan), earning critical and public acclaim for its deeply human, psychologically harrowing time-travel narrative and securing its legacy as one of the greatest anime series ever made. (Note: Attributed to multiple sources:)
- April 14: Anohana: The Flower We Saw That Day premieres on Fuji TV's Noitamina block, gaining acclaim from audiences and critics for its profoundly devastating, cathartic exploration of shared childhood grief and becoming one of the premier anime tear-jerkers of the 2010s. (Note: Attributed to multiple sources:)
- April 24: The series finale of Total Drama World Tour premieres on Teletoon in Canada.
- April 27: Season 15 of South Park begins on Comedy Central with the premiere of the episode "HumancentiPad". It was seen by just over 3.1 million viewers that night.

=== May ===
- May 1: The first episode of Raa Raa the Noisy Lion aired.
- May 3:
  - The first episodes of The Amazing World of Gumball & The Looney Tunes Show aired on Cartoon Network.
  - Punky airs for the first time.
- May 15: The Cleveland Show concludes its second season on Fox with the episode "Hot Cocoa Bang Bang". The finale was seen by exactly 4.9 million viewers that night.
- May 22:
  - The film Kung Fu Panda 2 premiered.
  - American Dad! concludes its seventh season on Fox with the episode "Gorillas in the Mist". The finale was seen by over 3.5 million viewers that night.
  - The Simpsons concludes its 22nd season on Fox with the episode "The Ned-Liest Catch", in which Ned Flanders and Edna Krabappel become romantically involved, ending on a cliffhanger regarding whether or not they will stay together. Viewers are invited to vote over the matter. On September 25, at the start of the new season, the next episode "The Falcon and the D'ohman" reveals that they have indeed become a couple by viewer request.
  - Bob's Burgers concludes its first season on Fox with the episode "Torpedo". The finale was seen by just over 4.3 million viewers that night.
  - Family Guy concludes its ninth season on Fox with the final episode in the Star Wars trilogy parody "Its a Trap!". The finale was seen by over 5.8 million viewers that night.

=== June ===
- June 1:
  - Peter Dodd's Freddy Frogface premiered.
  - Joann Sfar and Antoine Delesvaux' The Rabbi's Cat was released, based on Sfar's graphic novel of the same name.
- June 13: Season 5 of Johnny Test begins on Cartoon Network with the premiere of the episodes "Johnny Goes Nuts/Johnny Daddy Day".
- June 18: The Walt Disney Company/Pixar film Cars 2 was released, which gained negative attention over the 2006 predecessor for lacking the originality, unnecessary spy themes, and gun violence.
- June 27: Nickelodeon launches a revival of Winx Club with a one-hour special.
- Specific date unknown: Dutch animator Rosto's The Monster of Nix was released, a mixture of live-action and animation, with the voices of Tom Waits, Terry Gilliam and The Residents.

=== July ===
- July 15: Winnie the Pooh is released, receiving favorable reviews. Due to John Lasseter’s involvement and devotion with the CG animation for subsequent films, this would be the last traditionally animated film produced by Walt Disney Animation Studios until Lasseter left Disney in 2018 and the studio announced in 2019 that there would be possibilities for more hand-drawn films in the future.
- July 16: Goro Miyazaki's From Up on Poppy Hill premieres.

=== August ===
- August 1: Secret Mountain Fort Awesome airs its first episode on Cartoon Network.
- August 5: Phineas and Ferb the Movie: Across the 2nd Dimension, the first film based on Phineas and Ferb, premiered on Disney Channel to critical acclaim. The film's premiere reeled in a total of 7.6 million viewers that night, thus making it the highest-rated animated children's program of the year.
- August 19: Alan Becker releases "Animator vs Animation III" on Newgrounds.
- August 25: Phineas and Ferb creators Dan Povenmire & Jeff "Swampy" Marsh make a multi-year deal with Disney Television Animation which includes the following:
  - A fourth season renewal of the show.
  - A pilot for a potential spin-off of the show.
- August 31: After 11 years, Between the Lions is removed from PBS Kids.

=== September ===
- September 3: Scooby-Doo! Legend of the Phantosaur premieres on Cartoon Network. The film gave us the "Ultra Instinct Shaggy" meme 6 years later.
- September 8: Futurama concludes its sixth season on Comedy Central with the episode "Reincarnation". The finale was seen by over 1.4 million viewers that night.
- September 12:
  - The first episode of Detentionaire airs.
  - Johnny Test concludes its fourth season on Cartoon Network with the episode "Johnny X Strikes Back Again!".
- September 16: The film Top Cat: The Movie premieres.
- September 21: The first episode of Plim Plim airs.
- September 25:
  - Season 23 of The Simpsons begins on Fox with the premiere of the episode "The Falcon and the D'ohman", which features the following guest stars: Tom Colicchio, Kevin Michael Richardson, & Kiefer Sutherland.
  - Season 3 of The Cleveland Show begins on Fox with the premiere of the episode "BFFs", guest starring professional wrestler Ric Flair.
  - Season 10 of Family Guy begins on Fox with the premiere of the episode "Lottery Fever".
  - Season 8 of American Dad! begins on Fox with the premiere of the episode "Hot Water".
- September 29:
  - The Danish film Ronal the Barbarian is released.
  - The Problem Solverz concludes its first season on Cartoon Network with the episode "Tux Dog's Island". This was the last episode to air on Cartoon Network as the show's second & final season would instead release on Netflix due to its critically negative reception.

=== October ===
- October 1: Fate/Zero first airs on Tokyo MX (along with other Japanese syndication networks), quickly receiving widespread critical and audience acclaim for its mature storytelling and stellar animation and becoming largely recognized as one of the best anime series of both 2011 and the entire decade. (Note: Attributed to multiple sources:)
- October 2:
- The first episode of China, IL airs.
- The Seth MacFarlane crossover event "Night of the Hurricane" occurs on Fox:
  - Part 1: The Hurricane! (The Cleveland Show)
  - Part 2: Seahorse Seashell Party (Family Guy)
    - Critics & fans have declared this to be the worst episode of the show, mainly due to Meg taking back everything she said about Peter, Lois, & Chris at the end of the episode, even though she had every right to scold them for constantly bullying her all these years.
  - Part 3: Hurricane! (American Dad!)
- Hunter × Hunter premieres on Nippon TV, surpassing the 1999 anime adaptation to achieve near-universal acclaim as one of the greatest anime series of the decade and of all time. (Note: Attributed to multiple sources:)
- October 16: Puss in Boots, a spin-off in the Shrek franchise, is first released.
- October 18: The film Batman: Year One is first released.
- October 23: Steven Spielberg and Peter Jackson release The Adventures of Tintin: The Secret of the Unicorn, a CGI-film adaptation of the Belgian comics series Tintin.
- October 27: A reboot of Beavis and Butt-Head first airs, but only lasts a season. The series would later have another revival on Paramount+ in 2022.

=== November ===
- November 11: The film Arthur Christmas is released by Aardman Animations and Sony Pictures Animation.
- November 16: South Park concludes its 15th season on Comedy Central with the episode "The Poor Kid". It was seen by just over 3.1 million viewers that night.
- November 18: The film Happy Feet Two is first released.
- November 23:
  - Jean-François Laguionie's The Painting premieres.
  - The Fairly OddParents' hour-long special "Timmy's Secret Wish!" premiered on Nickelodeon, it is revealed that Timmy has secretly wished for him and everyone else on earth to stop aging for 50 years so that he doesn't have to worry about growing up and losing his fairies. The special was seen by over 2.9 million viewers that night, it ended up being the highest-rated episode premiere of that night.

=== December ===
- December 17: The first episode of Transformers: Rescue Bots airs.
- December 28: Bambi and A Computer Animated Hand are added to the National Film Registry.

=== Specific date unknown ===
- Robert Morgan's Bobby Yeah premieres.

== Awards ==
- Academy Award for Best Animated Feature: Toy Story 3
- Academy Award for Best Animated Short: The Lost Thing
- Animation Kobe Feature Film Award: Macross Frontier: Sayonara no Tsubasa
- Annecy International Animated Film Festival Cristal du long métrage: The Rabbi's Cat
- Annie Award for Best Animated Feature: Rango
- Asia Pacific Screen Award for Best Animated Feature Film: Leafie, A Hen into the Wild
- BAFTA Award for Best Animated Film: Rango
- César Award for Best Animated Film: The Rabbi's Cat
- European Film Award for Best Animated Film: Chico and Rita
- Goya Award for Best Animated Film: Wrinkles
- Japan Academy Prize for Animation of the Year: From up on Poppy Hill
- Japan Media Arts Festival Animation Grand Prize: Puella Magi Madoka Magica
- Mainichi Film Awards - Animation Grand Award: Hotarubi no Mori e

== Films released ==
- January 6 - 3 to the rescue (Dominican Republic)
- January 18:
  - LeapFrog: Numbers Ahoy (United States)
  - Leapfrog: The Amazing Alphabet Amusement Park (United States)
- January 21:
  - Brasil Animado (Brazil)
  - Pleasant Goat and Big Big Wolf – Moon Castle: The Space Adventure (China)
- January 22 - Broken Blade 5: Death's Horizon (Japan)
- January 25 - Dead Space: Aftermath (United States)
- February 3 - Little Big Panda (China, France, Germany, Luxembourg and Spain)
- February 10:
  - Fimfarum – The Third Time Lucky (Czech Republic)
  - The Great Bear (Denmark)
- February 11 - Gnomeo & Juliet (United States and United Kingdom)
- February 18 - Eetu ja Konna (Finland)
- February 22 - All-Star Superman (United States)
- February 24 - The Green Wave (Germany)
- March 4 - Rango (United States)
- March 5 - Doraemon: Nobita and the New Steel Troops—Winged Angels (Japan)
- March 8 - VeggieTales: 'Twas the Night Before Easter (United States)
- March 10 - Die Tigerentenbande – Der Film (Germany)
- March 11:
  - George the Hedgehog (Poland)
  - Mars Needs Moms (United States)
- March 15 - Barbie: A Fairy Secret (United States)
- March 19 - Pretty Cure All Stars DX3: Deliver the Future! The Rainbow-Colored Flower That Connects the World (Japan)
- March 22 - The Little Engine That Could (United States)
- March 26 - Broken Blade 6: Bastions of Sorrow (Japan)
- April 1 - Hop (United States)
- April 6:
  - Titeuf (France)
  - Winnie the Pooh (Belgium)
- April 11 - Marx Reloaded (Germany)
- April 15 - Rio (United States)
- April 16:
  - Crayon Shin-chan: The Storm Called: Operation Golden Spy (Japan)
  - Detective Conan: Quarter of Silence (Japan)
- April 29:
  - Hoodwinked Too! Hood vs. Evil (United States)
  - Legend of the Millennium Dragon (Japan)
- May 1 - Children of the Devil (Germany)
- May 7 - Children Who Chase Lost Voices from Deep Below (Japan)
- May 10:
  - Chop Kick Panda (United States)
  - Gene-Fusion (United States)
- May 17 - Thor: Tales of Asgard (United States)
- May 26 - Kung Fu Panda 2 (United States)
- May 28 - Buddha: The Great Departure (Japan)
- June 1:
  - Orla Frosnapper (Denmark)
  - The Rabbi's Cat (France)
- June 3 - The Lion of Judah (United States)
- June 4 - Sengoku Basara: The Last Party (Japan)
- June 7 - Green Lantern: Emerald Knights (United States)
- June 8 - The Prodigies (France, Luxembourg and Belgium)
- June 23 - Werner – Eiskalt! (Germany)
- June 24 - Cars 2 (United States)
- June 25 - Heaven's Lost Property the Movie: The Angeloid of Clockwork (Japan)
- July 2 - Fullmetal Alchemist: The Sacred Star of Milos (Japan)
- July 9 - A Fairly Odd Movie: Grow Up, Timmy Turner! (United States and Canada)
- July 11 - Legend of a Rabbit (China)
- July 15:
  - Winnie the Pooh (United States)
  - The Tibetan Dog (China and Japan)
- July 16:
  - From up on Poppy Hill (Japan)
  - Pokémon the Movie: Black—Victini and Reshiram (Japan)
  - Pokémon the Movie: White—Victini and Zekrom (Japan)
- July 20 - Tales of the Night (France)
- July 27 - Naruto: Blood Prison (Japan)
- July 28:
  - Leafie, A Hen into the Wild (South Korea)
  - Seer (China)
- July 29 - Jock the Hero Dog (South Africa)
- July 30 - Alice in the Country of Hearts: Wonderful Wonder World (Japan)
- August 5 - Phineas and Ferb: Across the 2nd Dimension (United States)
- August 10 - Jensen & Jensen (Denmark)
- August 11:
  - Crulic: The Path to Beyond (Romania and Poland)
  - Legend of the Moles: The Frozen Horror (China and Spain)
- August 13 - VeggieTales: Princess and the Popstar (United States)
- August 23 - Tom and Jerry and the Wizard of Oz (United States)
- August 25 - Lotte and the Moonstone Secret (Estonia and Latvia)
- August 27 - Hayate the Combat Butler! Heaven Is a Place on Earth (Japan)
- September 1 - Princess Lillifee and the Little Unicorn (Germany)
- September 3:
  - Mardock Scramble: The Second Combustion (Japan)
  - Scooby-Doo! Legend of the Phantosaur (United States)
  - Tekken: Blood Vengeance (Japan)
- September 5 - Frog Paradise (Russia)
- September 10 - A Letter to Momo (Japan)
- September 13 - Barbie: Princess Charm School (United States)
- September 16 - Top Cat: The Movie (Mexico and Argentina)
- September 17 - The Light of a Firefly Forest (Japan)
- September 19 - Wrinkles (Spain)
- September 29:
  - Alois Nebel (Czech Republic)
  - Ronal the Barbarian (Denmark)
- October 1:
  - Brave Rabbit (China)
  - The Princess and the Pilot (Japan)
- October 4 - VeggieTales: The Little Drummer Boy (United States)
- October 7 - SeeFood (Malaysia)
- October 8 - The King of Pigs (South Korea)
- October 11 - Puss in Boots: A Furry Tale (United States)
- October 13 - Laura's Star and the Dream Monsters (Germany)
- October 14 - Legends of Valhalla: Thor (Iceland, Germany and Ireland)
- October 18 - Batman: Year One (United States)
- October 19 - Emilie Jolie (Belgium and France)
- October 20 - Eva from Argentina (Argentina)
- October 21:
  - La Leyenda de La Llorona (Mexico)
  - A Monster in Paris (France)
- October 23 - Magic Tree House (Japan)
- October 28 - Puss in Boots (United States)
- November - Walter & Tandoori's Christmas (Canada)
- November 1 - Tappy Toes (United States)
- November 3 - Tormenti – Film disegnato (Italy)
- November 4 - Johnny Bravo Goes to Bollywood (United States)
- November 8:
  - Barbie: A Perfect Christmas (United States)
  - Leapfrog: Phonics Farm (United States)
- November 11:
  - Arthur Christmas (United States and United Kingdom)
  - Super K – The Movie (India)
- November 15 - The Littlest Angel (United States)
- November 18:
  - Happy Feet Two (United States and Australia)
  - The Magic Crystal (Finland)
- November 23 - The Painting (Belgium and France)
- November 25 - Daddy, I'm a Zombie (Spain)
- December 2 - The Elf Who Stole Christmas (Spain)
- December 3 - K-On! (Japan)
- December 8 - The Tragedy of Man (Hungary)
- December 17 - Friends: Naki on Monster Island (Japan)
- December 21 - The Adventures of Tintin (United States)
- December 22 - Kikoriki. Team Invincible (Russia)
- December 29 - Ivan Tsarevich and the Grey Wolf (Russia)
- December 31 - The Jungle Bunch: Back to the Ice Floe (France)
- Specific date unknown:
  - Jesus: He Lived Among Us (United States)
  - Kuiba (China)
  - Tatsumi (Singapore)

== Television series debuts ==
Date	Title	Channel	Year
January 1	Off the Air	Adult Swim	2011–present
January 1	Dan Vs.	The Hub	2011–2013
January 3	Wild Kratts	PBS Kids	2011–present
January 7	Almost Naked Animals	YTV	2011–2013
January 7	Puella Magi Madoka Magica	TBS	2011
January 9	Bob's Burgers	Fox	2011–present
January 14	Ninjago	Cartoon Network, Netflix	2011–2022
January 23	Mongo Wrestling Alliance	Adult Swim	2011
January 24	Bubble Guppies	Nick Jr.	2011–2016, 2019–2023
February 5	The DaVincibles	Seven Network	2011
February 12	Pokémon: Black & White	Cartoon Network	2011–2012
February 14	Jake and the Neverland Pirates	Disney Junior	2011–2016
February 14	Mickey's Mousekersize	Disney Junior	2011
February 28	Robocar Poli	EBS	2011–2020
March 13	BoBoiBoy	TV3	2011–2016
March 26	God, the Devil and Bob	NBC, Adult Swim	2000; 2011
April 1	Scaredy Squirrel	YTV	2011–2013
April 3	Tiger & Bunny	Tokyo MX	2011
April 3	Nichijou	TV Aichi	2011
April 4	The Problem Solverz	Cartoon Network	2011–2013
April 6	Steins;Gate	AT-X, CTC, Sun TV, TV Aichi, TV Saitama, tvk, Tokyo MX	2011
April 14	Anohana	Fuji TV	2011
May 3	The Looney Tunes Show	Cartoon Network	2011–2014
May 3	The Amazing World of Gumball	Cartoon Network	2011–2019
May 24	Soul Quest Overdrive	Adult Swim	2011
June 16	Voltron Force	Nicktoons	2011–2012
June 24	Toy Story Toons	Disney Channel	2011–2012
June 27	Winx Club (revival)	Nickelodeon, Rai	2011–2019
July 9	Redakai: Conquer the Kairu	YTV	2011–2013
July 29	ThunderCats (reboot)	Cartoon Network	2011–2012
August 1	Secret Mountain Fort Awesome	Cartoon Network	2011–2012
September 1	Superbook (reboot)	Tokyo MX, Smile, ABC Family	2011-2021
September 3	Rated A for Awesome	YTV	2011-2012
September 19	Kung Fu Panda: Legends of Awesomeness	Nickelodeon	2011–2016
September 22	Justin Time	Family Channel	2011–2016
October 1	Fate/Zero	Tokyo MX	2011–2012
October 2	China, IL	Adult Swim	2011–2015
October 2	Hunter × Hunter	Nippon TV	2011–2014
October 4	Chihayafuru	Nippon TV	2011–2020
October 23	Secret Millionaires Club	The Hub	2011–2014
October 27	Beavis and Butt-Head (revival)	MTV	1993–1997, 2011
October 27	Good Vibes	MTV	2011
October 30	Allen Gregory	Fox	2011
November 11	DC Nation Shorts	Cartoon Network	2011–2014
November 11	Green Lantern: The Animated Series	Cartoon Network	2011–2013
November 14	Minnie's Bow-Toons	Disney Junior	2011–2016
November 15	Black Panther	BET	2011
December 17	Transformers: Rescue Bots	The Hub	2011–2016

== Television series endings ==
Date	Title	Channel	Year	Notes
January 17	WordWorld	PBS Kids	2007–2011	Ended
January 24	Robotomy	Cartoon Network	2010–2011	Cancelled
February 5	Pokémon: DP Sinnoh League Victors	Cartoon Network	2010–2011	Ended
February 25	Mickey's Mousekersize	Disney Junior	2011	Cancelled
March 26	God, the Devil and Bob	NBC, Adult Swim	2000; 2011	Cancelled
April 9	Sym-Bionic Titan	Cartoon Network	2010–2011	Cancelled
May 7	Zevo-3	Nicktoons	2010–2011	Cancelled
May 24	Soul Quest Overdrive	Adult Swim	2011	Cancelled
May 31	The Nutshack	Myx TV	2007–2011	Ended
June 4	Kid vs. Kat	Disney XD, YTV	2009–2011	Ended
June 18	The Mighty B!	Nicktoons	2008–2011	Ended
July 16	Hot Wheels Battle Force 5	Cartoon Network, Teletoon	2009–2011	Ended
July 15	Jimmy Two-Shoes	Disney XD, Teletoon	2009–2011	Ended
July 23	G.I. Joe: Renegades	The Hub	2010–2011	Cancelled
July 31	Mongo Wrestling Alliance	Adult Swim	2011	Cancelled
September 16	Go, Diego, Go!	Nick Jr.	2005−2011	Ended
October 14	Peep and the Big Wide World	Discovery Kids, PBS Kids	2004−2011	Ended
October 14	The Super Hero Squad Show	Cartoon Network	2009–2011	Ended
November 4	Ni Hao, Kai-Lan	Nick Jr.	2008–2011	Ended
November 7	Glenn Martin, DDS	Nick at Nite	2009–2011	Ended
November 12	Back at the Barnyard	Nicktoons	2007–2011	Ended
November 18	Batman: The Brave and the Bold	Cartoon Network	2008–2011	Ended
November 25	Take Two with Phineas and Ferb	Disney Channel	2010–2011	Cancelled
November 29	Black Panther	BET	2011	Cancelled
December 18	Allen Gregory	Fox	2011	Cancelled
December 29	Beavis and Butt-Head	MTV	1993–1997; 2011	Cancelled, until revived by Paramount+ in 2022.
December 29	Good Vibes	MTV	2011	Cancelled

== Television season premieres ==
Date	Title	Season	Channel
February 4	Ben 10: Ultimate Alien	2	Cartoon Network
February 4	Generator Rex	2	Cartoon Network
February 12	The Fairly OddParents	8	Nickelodeon
March 4	Phineas and Ferb	3	Disney Channel (Note: Season premiered on Disney XD the following day.)
March 26	SpongeBob SquarePants	8	Nickelodeon
April 27	South Park	15	Comedy Central
June 13	Johnny Test	5	Cartoon Network
July 11	Adventure Time	3	Cartoon Network
August 22	Mad	2	Cartoon Network
September 16	Ben 10: Ultimate Alien	3	Cartoon Network
September 19	Regular Show	3	Cartoon Network
September 25	American Dad!	8	Fox
September 25	The Cleveland Show	3	Fox
September 25	Family Guy	10	Fox
September 25	The Simpsons	23	Fox
November 4	Fish Hooks	2	Disney Channel
November 11	Generator Rex	3	Cartoon Network
December 30	Secret Mountain Fort Awesome	2	Cartoon Network

== Television season finales ==
Date	Title	Season	Channel
February 11	Phineas and Ferb	2	Disney Channel (Note: Season concluded on Disney XD on March 7th.)
April 25	Fanboy & Chum Chum	2	Nickelodeon
April 29	Ben 10: Ultimate Alien	2	Cartoon Network
May 9	Adventure Time	2	Cartoon Network
May 15	The Cleveland Show	2	Fox
May 22	American Dad!	7	Fox
May 22	Bob's Burgers	1	Fox
May 22	Family Guy	9	Fox
May 22	The Simpsons	22	Fox
June 11	SpongeBob SquarePants	7	Nickelodeon
June 20	Mad	1	Cartoon Network
July 26	Scooby-Doo! Mystery Incorporated	1	Cartoon Network
August 1	Regular Show	2	Cartoon Network
September 8	Futurama	6	Comedy Central
September 12	Johnny Test	4	Cartoon Network
September 29	The Problem Solverz	1	Cartoon Network
October 21	Fish Hooks	1	Disney Channel
November 4	Generator Rex	2	Cartoon Network
November 16	South Park	15	Comedy Central
December 16	Secret Mountain Fort Awesome	1	Cartoon Network
December 29	The Fairly OddParents	8	Nickelodeon

== Births ==
=== February ===
- February 10: Ravi Cabot-Conyers, American actor (voice of Antonio Madrigal in Encanto and Once Upon a Studio).

=== May ===
- May 17: Rylee Alazraqui, American actress and daughter of Carlos Alazraqui (voice of Emma in Stillwater, Rok-Tahk in Star Trek: Prodigy, Julie and Safari Sarah in Doug Unplugs, Grace in Puppy Dog Pals, Milk in the Apple & Onion episode "A New Life", Agnes in the Doc McStuffins episode "The Doc McStuffins Christmas Special", additional voices in Summer Camp Island).

=== September ===
- September 15: Lexi Sexton, American child actress (voice of Adelaide Chang in The Loud House and The Casagrandes, Kid at Home #3 in the Teen Titans Go! episode "Toddler Titans... Yay!").

== Deaths ==
=== January ===
- January 2: Peter Hobbs, French-American actor (voice of Jerry in Heavy Traffic, American General in The Nine Lives of Fritz the Cat, General in Wizards), dies at age 92.
- January 6: Aron Kincaid, American actor (voice of Killer Croc in Batman: The Animated Series, Sky Lynx in The Transformers, the Nerdator in the Freakazoid! episode "Nerdator", Fritter O'Way in the DuckTales episode "Down and Out in Duckburg"), dies at age 70.
- January 11: Tony Geiss, American author, songwriter (Sesame Street), producer and screenwriter (Sesame Street, An American Tail, The Land Before Time, Between the Lions, Play with Me Sesame), dies from complications after a fall at age 86.
- January 13: Jack LaLanne, American fitness & nutrition guru and motivational speaker (voiced himself in The Simpsons episode "The Old Man and the 'C' Student"), dies from pneumonia at age 96.
- January 26: Clément Sauvé, Canadian comic book artist and character designer (G.I. Joe: Renegades), dies from cancer at age 33.
- January 27:
  - Boyd Kirkland, American television director (Batman: The Animated Series, X-Men: Evolution, The Avengers: Earth's Mightiest Heroes), dies at age 60.
  - Charlie Callas, American actor and comedian (voice of Elliott in Pete's Dragon), dies at age 86.

=== February ===
- February 10: Bill Justice, American animator (Walt Disney Animation Studios), dies at age 97.
- February 12: Kenneth Mars, American actor (voice of King Triton in The Little Mermaid franchise, Tuskernini in Darkwing Duck, Professor Screweyes in We're Back! A Dinosaur's Story, Grandpa Longneck in The Land Before Time franchise, Beethoven in the Animaniacs episode "Roll Over, Beethoven", Dr. Gunter Hunterhanker in the Freakazoid! episode "Candle Jack"), dies at age 75.
- February 21: Dwayne McDuffie, American comic book writer, television producer and writer (Warner Bros. Animation), dies from complications from emergency heart surgery at age 49.
- February 22: Jean Dinning, American singer (sang "Blame It on the Samba" in Melody Time), dies at age 86.

=== March ===
- March 20: Johnny Pearson, English composer (Captain Pugwash), dies at age 85.
- March 23: Elizabeth Taylor, English-American actress (voice of Mrs. Andrews in the Captain Planet and the Planeteers episode "A Formula for Hate", Sarah in the God, the Devil and Bob episode "God's Girlfriend", Maggie Simpson and herself in The Simpsons episodes "Lisa's First Word" and "Krusty Gets Kancelled"), dies from heart failure at age 79.

=== April ===
- April 4: Wayne Robson, Canadian actor (voice of Frank in The Rescuers Down Under), dies at age 64.
- April 17: Osamu Dezaki, Japanese film director, producer (co-founder of Madhouse) and screenwriter, dies at age 67.
- April 27: Oscar Kawagley, Yup'ik anthropologist, teacher and actor (voice of Inuit Narrator in Brother Bear), dies from cancer at age 76.

=== May ===
- May 10: Norma Zimmer, American actress (voice of White Rose in Alice in Wonderland), dies at age 87.
- May 16: Bill Skiles, American comedian (voice of Monkeys in The Jungle Book), dies at age 79.
- May 20: Randy Savage, American professional wrestler and actor (voice of Thug in Bolt, Sasquatch in The X's, Rasslor in the Dexter's Laboratory episode of the same name, Leonard Ghostal in the Space Ghost Coast to Coast episode "Piledriver", Master Sergeant Emily Dickinson Jones in the Duck Dodgers episode "Back to the Academy", Biker in the Whatever Happened to Robot Jones? episode "Family Vacation", Gorilla in the King of the Hill episode "Bill, Bulk and the Body Buddies"), dies at age 58.
- May 21: Bill Hunter, Australian actor (voice of Phillip Sherman in Finding Nemo, Bubo in Legend of the Guardians: The Owls of Ga'Hoole), dies from liver cancer at age 71.
- May 25: Lillian Adams, American actress (voice of Rosa in Heavy Traffic, Italian Woman in Hey Good Lookin'), dies at age 89.

=== June ===
- June 18: Clarence Clemons, American musician and actor (voice of the Narrator in The Simpsons episode "Grift of the Magi"), dies from a stroke at age 69.
- June 23:
  - Peter Falk, American actor (voice of Bailey in Hubert's Brain, Don Feinberg in Shark Tale), dies from pneumonia at age 83.
  - Fred Steiner, American conductor, orchestrator, film historian, arranger and composer (The Adventures of Rocky and Bullwinkle and Friends, Tiny Toon Adventures), dies from a stroke at age 88.
- June 25: Alice Playten, American actress (voice of Gloria in Heavy Metal, Baby Lickety-Split and Baby Moondancer in Generation 1 of My Little Pony, Poindexter in Felix the Cat: The Movie, Beebe Bluff in Doug), dies at age 63.

=== July ===
- July 5: Gordon Tootoosis, Saskatchewan actor (voice of Kekata in Pocahontas, Mushom in Wapos Bay, Gordy in Open Season), dies from pneumonia at age 69.
- July 12: Sherwood Schwartz, American television writer and producer (creator of The Brady Kids, The New Adventures of Gilligan and Gilligan's Planet, co-wrote the song "The Ballad of Gilligan's Isle" which was used on Rugrats Go Wild and the Robot Chicken episode "Suck It", and "The Brady Bunch Theme" which was parodied as the "T.U.F.F. and D.O.O.M. Theme" in the T.U.F.F. Puppy episode "Share-A-Lair"), dies at age 94.
- July 15: Michael Magee, Canadian actor, singer and author (voice of Cyril Sneer in The Racoons), dies at age 81.
- July 23: Toyoo Ashida, Japanese film director and character designer (Fist of the North Star, Vampire Hunter D, The Mysterious Cities of Gold) and producer (Studio Live), dies at age 67.
- July 29: Dominique Benicheti, French film director and producer, dies at age 68.
- July 31: Carl Steven, American former child actor (voice of Pigpen and Franklin in Snoopy's Getting Married, Charlie Brown, Woody in Happily Ever After, Jamie Bingham in Fluppy Dogs, Fred Jones in A Pup Named Scooby-Doo), dies from a drug overdose at age 36.

=== August ===
- August 22: Joan Gerber, American actress (voice of Granny in Corn on the Cop, Irma Boyle in Wait Till Your Father Gets Home, The Elephant in The Mouse and His Child, Mrs. Rich and Irona the Maid in Richie Rich, Mrs. Kelp in Snorks, Mrs. Beakley and Glittering Goldie in DuckTales, Gotcha Grabmore in Tiny Toon Adventures, Shreeka in the Teenage Mutant Ninja Turtles episode "Shreeka's Revenge"), dies at age 76.

=== September ===
- September 4: Dave Hoover, American comics artist and animator (Wanderers, Starman, Captain America), dies at age 56.
- September 14: Kevyn Wallace, American animator (Rocko's Modern Life), background artist (Freakazoid!, The Proud Family Movie, The Simpsons Movie) and layout artist (Bebe's Kids, Earthworm Jim, Walt Disney Animation Studios), dies in a car accident at age 48.
- September 18: Tom Daly, Canadian film producer (My Financial Career), dies at age 93.
- September 19: Earl Kress, American animation historian, storyboard artist (The Kwicky Koala Show, The Addams Family) and screenwriter (Fat Albert and the Cosby Kids, The Fox and the Hound, Hanna-Barbera, The Transformers, The Berenstain Bears, Ghostbusters, Warner Bros. Animation, Mother Goose and Grimm, Disney Television Animation, The New Woody Woodpecker Show, Winx Club, The X's, Monster Allergy, Geronimo Stilton), dies from liver cancer at age 60.

=== October ===
- October 5:
  - Steve Jobs, American business magnate (co-founder of Pixar), dies at age 56.
  - Charles Napier, American actor (voice of Duke Phillips in The Critic, General Hardcastle in the DC Animated Universe, Cooley in the Buzz Lightyear of Star Command episode "Haunted Moon", original voice of the Sheriff in Squidbillies), dies at age 75.

=== November ===
- November 4: Sarah Watt, Australian film director and animator (The Way of the Birds), dies from cancer at age 53.
- November 7: Joe Frazier, American professional boxer (voiced himself in The Simpsons episodes "Brother, Can You Spare Two Dimes?" and "Homer's Paternity Coot"), dies from liver cancer at age 67.
- November 18: Mark Hall, English animator and film producer (Cosgrove Hall Films, Danger Mouse), dies from cancer at age 75.
- November 30: Zdeněk Miler, Czech animator, film director, and illustrator (The Little Mole), dies at age 90.

=== December ===
- December 1:
  - Shingo Araki, Japanese film and television director (Mushi Production, Toei Animation, Tokyo Movie Shinshia) and producer (co-founder of Toei Animation), dies at age 72.
  - Bill McKinney, American actor (voice of Jonah Hex in the Batman: The Animated Series episode "Showdown"), dies at age 80.
  - Alan Sues, American actor and comedian (voice of Sir Leonard Looney in Raggedy Ann and Andy: A Musical Adventure, Scratcher in Rudolph and Frosty's Christmas in July), dies at age 85.
- December 2: Bruno Bianchi, French animator and comics artist (Inspector Gadget, DIC Entertainment, SIP Animation), dies from cancer at age 56.
- December 5: Dan Mills, American animator (Beany and Cecil, Linus the Lionhearted, Hanna-Barbera, Filmation, Teenage Mutant Ninja Turtles, Freddie as F.R.O.7, Asterix Conquers America, The Pagemaster, Cats Don't Dance, Family Guy) and storyboard artist (101 Dalmatians: The Series, Hercules, The Hunchback of Notre Dame II), dies at age 80.
- December 7:
  - Harry Morgan, American actor and director (voice of Carolinus in The Flight of Dragons, Bill Gannon in The Simpsons episode "Mother Simpson"), dies from pneumonia at age 96.
  - Ricky Garduno, American animator and storyboard artist (¡Mucha Lucha!, Coconut Fred's Fruit Salad Island, The Buzz on Maggie, El Tigre: The Adventures of Manny Rivera, Making Fiends, Family Guy), commits suicide at age 35.
- December 15: Merlee Shapiro, Canadian actress (voice of the Storyteller in Caillou), dies at an unknown age.
- December 30: Ronald Searle, English illustrator, cartoonist and comics artist (The Happiest Days of Your Life, Energetically Yours, Those Magnificent Men in their Flying Machines, Monte Carlo or Bust! and Dick Deadeye, or Duty Done), dies at age 91.

== See also ==
- 2011 in anime
