= Night of the Hurricane =

2011 American television crossover event

- Crossover event
- Promotional poster
- Original air date: October 2, 2011

Part 1: The Cleveland Show
- Episode title: "The Hurricane!"
- Episode no.: Season 3 Episode 2
- Directed by: Ron Rubio
- Written by: Kirker Butler
- Production code: 2APS20

Episode chronology
← Previous "BFFs"	Next → "Nightmare on Grace Street"
- The Cleveland Show season 3

Part 2: Family Guy
- Episode title: "Seahorse Seashell Party"
- Episode no.: Season 10; Episode 2
- Directed by: Brian Iles
- Written by: Wellesley Wild
- Production code: 8ACX20

Episode chronology
← Previous "Lottery Fever"	Next → "Screams of Silence: The Story of Brenda Q"
- Family Guy season 10

Part 3: American Dad!
- Episode title: "Hurricane!"
- Episode no.: Season 7 Episode 2
- Directed by: Tim Parsons
- Written by: Erik Sommers
- Production code: 6AJN07

Episode chronology
← Previous "Hot Water"	Next → "A Ward Show"
- American Dad! season 8

Night of the Hurricane is a 2011 crossover event on the Animation Domination lineup on Fox. The event involved the three animated television series created by Seth MacFarlane: The Cleveland Show, Family Guy and American Dad!. The event depicts a hurricane which hits the towns of Stoolbend (The Cleveland Show setting), Quahog (Family Guy setting) and Langley Falls (American Dad! setting). The actual three-way crossover of the event occurs at the end on American Dad! with the three fathers of each family in the same scene.

The Night of the Hurricane event is similar to the NBC Hurricane Saturday event of 1991 with three series created by Susan Harris—The Golden Girls, Empty Nest and Nurses. It was originally scheduled to air on May 1, 2011, but was delayed after the 2011 Super Outbreak in the Southern United States. It eventually aired on October 2, 2011. Coincidentally, those episodes aired exactly two months after Hurricane Irene, which caused some damage to Virginia, the state where the shows American Dad! and The Cleveland Show take place, and Rhode Island, the state where the show Family Guy takes place.

== Plot ==
The event begins on The Cleveland Show episode "The Hurricane!", when the storm hits Stoolbend, forcing the Browns to cancel their vacation plans. In the meantime, Cleveland Jr. shocks everyone by announcing that he does not believe in God. The event continues on the Family Guy episode "Seahorse Seashell Party", when the storm moves to Quahog and the Griffins try to find ways to pass the time. Brian takes magic mushrooms which cause him to hallucinate, while Meg finally loses her temper at Peter, Lois and Chris for all the times they maltreated her over the years. The event ends on the American Dad! episode "Hurricane!", when the storm reaches Langley Falls, causing the Smiths to fight for survival after the sea wall breaks and causes the city to flood. After the storm passes, the houses of the three families end up in the same neighborhood. Stan, Cleveland and Peter face each other in a stand-off, during which Francine comes out the front door, leading to Stan accidentally shooting her, which Peter claims to be "classic American Dad!".

== Voice cast ==
- Seth MacFarlane as Peter Griffin, Stewie Griffin, Brian Griffin, Glenn Quagmire (as Monster Quagmire), Tom Tucker, Stan Smith, Roger, Greg Corbin, additional voices
- Mike Henry as Cleveland Brown, Rallo Tubbs, Dwayne Meighan, additional voices
- Sanaa Lathan as Donna Tubbs
- Kevin Michael Richardson as Cleveland Brown, Jr. and Principal Brian Lewis
- Reagan Gomez-Preston as Roberta Tubbs
- Edward Asner as Narrator ("The Hurricane!")
- John Slattery as Mayor of Stoolbend
- Arianna Huffington as Arianna the Bear
- Alex Borstein as Lois Griffin
- Seth Green as Chris Griffin
- Mila Kunis as Meg Griffin
- Christine Lakin as Joyce Kinney
- Ioan Gruffudd as Narrator ("Seahorse Seashell Party")
- Wendy Schaal as Francine Smith
- Rachael MacFarlane as Hayley Smith-Fischer and Barb Hanson
- Scott Grimes as Steve Smith
- Dee Bradley Baker as Klaus Heissler and Hoodle Monster
- Lisa Edelstein as Shari Rothberg
- Kristen Schaal and Roger Craig Smith as Roger's Girlfriend and Fanboy
- Matt McKenna as Buckle
- Jeff Fischer as himself
- Mike Barker as Terry Bates

== Production ==
=== Development ===
The crossover event is the first of its kind in the history of the animated television line-up on Fox. Kevin Reilly, the entertainment president of the Fox Broadcasting Company, originally pitched the idea for the crossover, which was inspired by theme nights of comedy shows from the 1980s. Creator Seth MacFarlane said that Reilly brought the idea to the writers, since a crossover of its kind had not been done in a while and Reilly thought "it might be kind of cool." Instead of having the American Dad! characters visit Family Guy and The Cleveland Show, MacFarlane chose to do one central storyline so that each writing staff would not have to write stories for unfamiliar characters. The three-episode-block was an "enormous challenge" and a "substantial undertaking", but MacFarlane said he would be willing to do it again if the ratings proved the event to be a success. The event was first announced in July 2010 by MacFarlane at San Diego Comic-Con when he revealed that the three dads of his shows, Peter, Stan and Cleveland, would appear in the same scene.

A general preview of the "Fox Animation Domination Crossover" was given at greater length at an interview with TV Guide. Having a running time of 90 minutes, the crossover begins with The Cleveland Show episode "The Hurricane!". Mike Henry exclaimed that "the hurricane comes at a very inopportune time for the Browns because they're about to go on a cruise." He continued: "They decide to have a cruise in the house, but that doesn't turn out to be so much fun." The crossover resumes with the Family Guy episode "Seahorse Seashell Party". Steve Callaghan said "Cabin fever escalates and Brian decides to use the time to take mushrooms. Stewie has to be his coach and walk him through his trip. You'll see images unlike anything you've ever seen on our show." The crossover reaches its ending with the American Dad! episode "Hurricane!". Mike Barker teased that "We have the burden of going last, so we end up flooding the house and turning it upside down. Basically, we're doing The Poseidon Adventure — with a shark loose in the house. Roger's one-night stand ends up caught on the ceiling." Ultimately, the house drifts and ends up in the same neighborhood as the Griffin and Brown homes. And yes, fans will finally get to see the casts of all three shows together as the sun comes out.

In April 2011, the Fox executives officially announced that the crossover event would air on May 1. However, on April 29, it was announced that, in response to a series of tornadoes that killed more than 300 people in the Southern United States, the aforementioned episodes would be removed from the schedule, out of respect and sensitivity for the victims. It was subsequently replaced by repeats of "I Am the Walrus" from American Dad!, "Brian Writes a Bestseller" from Family Guy, and "Ain't Nothin' But Mutton Bustin'" from The Cleveland Show. MacFarlane agreed with the decisions after consulting with the executives of Fox, and a spokeswoman for the company later announced that the episodes would air the following season. They finally aired on October 2, right after a public service announcement for the American Red Cross.

== Reception ==
The special divided critics and audiences, with the Cleveland Show episode receiving mixed reviews, the Family Guy episode being panned, and the American Dad episode being the more positive and well received one of the three.

=== Ratings ===
Viewership and ratings per episode of Night of the Hurricane
No.	Series	Air date	Rating/share (18–49)	Viewers (millions)
1	The Cleveland Show	October 2, 2011	2.6/6	5.47
2	Family Guy	October 2, 2011	3.5/8	6.91
3	American Dad!	October 2, 2011	2.7/6	5.71

== See also ==
- Hurricane Saturday – an earlier crossover event involving three NBC sitcoms–The Golden Girls, Empty Nest and Nurses
- Full Moon Over Miami – a second crossover event also involving The Golden Girls, Empty Nest and Nurses
- "The Simpsons Guy" – a crossover between Family Guy and The Simpsons
