= Hurricane! (American Dad!) =

- American Dad! episode
- Episode no.: Season 8 Episode 2
- Directed by: Tim Parsons
- Written by: Erik Sommers
- Production code: 6AJN07
- Original air date: October 2, 2011

Guest appearances
- Mike Barker as Terry Bates; Lisa Edelstein as Shari Rothberg; Jeff Fischer as himself; Mike Henry as Cleveland Brown, Rallo Tubbs; Matt McKenna as Buckle; Kevin Michael Richardson as Principal Lewis, Cleveland Jr.; Sanaa Lathan as Donna Tubbs; Reagan Gomez-Preston as Roberta Tubbs; Alex Borstein as Lois Griffin; Seth Green as Chris Griffin; Mila Kunis as Meg Griffin; Kristen Schaal as Roger's One Night Stand

Episode chronology
← Previous "Hot Water"	Next → "A Ward Show"
- American Dad! season 8

"Hurricane!" is the second episode of the eighth season of the animated comedy series American Dad!. It first aired on Fox in the United States on October 2, 2011. The episode's plot mainly revolves around the Smith family, who prepare for evacuation in response to an oncoming hurricane. Reluctant to leave his home, Stan encourages his family to ride out the storm in their house with him. The hurricane sends a flood to the city of Langley Falls, which puts the entire family in danger.

"Hurricane!" is the third and final part of the Night of the Hurricane block with Family Guy and The Cleveland Show. Kevin Reilly, the president of the entertainment division of Fox Broadcasting Company, introduced the idea of a crossover to Seth MacFarlane, the creator of all three shows. The episode was first announced at the 2010 San Diego Comic-Con. The episode's plot is loosely modeled to that of the disaster film The Poseidon Adventure. Originally scheduled to air on May 1, 2011, as an episode for the seventh season, "Hurricane!" was postponed due to the 2011 Super Outbreak.

The episode was well received by television critics, who praised its humor and cultural references. It was viewed by 5.72 million viewers upon its initial airing, while also receiving a 2.6/6 rating in the 18–49 demographic, according to Nielsen ratings. "Hurricane!" was written by Erik Sommers, and directed by Tim Parsons. It featured the guest voices of Mike Barker, Lisa Edelstein, Jeff Fischer, Mike Henry, Matt McKenna, Kevin Michael Richardson, Reagan Gomez-Preston, Sanaa Lathan, Alex Borstein, Seth Green, Mila Kunis, and Kristen Schaal.

== Plot ==
When a hurricane arrives at Langley Falls, the Smiths prepare to evacuate their home with their neighbor Buckle in his amphibious raft. Stan, however, recommends that the family stay home during the storm, believing it is the best way for everyone to be safe. Hayley wants to stay to help the left-behind zoo animals, and Jeff also wishes to stay since he goes where Hayley goes since they're married. Francine disagrees with Stan's notion, since he's bad with a crisis. Steve and Roger support her, with Steve siding with her since he wants his mom and Roger because of the reason Francine sides against Stan. Roger's date (whom he can't stand because she's clingy) sides with him and Francine. Klaus is about to say who he sides with, but no one cares about his opinion.

Before the debate can be resolved, the seawall breaks, and the ocean floods down the street, removing Buckle and his raft from its path and trapping the Smiths in their home. The neighborhood is now flooded, and the house is drifting along the floodwater's current while Francine scolds Stan for not evacuating the family to Her parents' house that morning. Attempting to save the family from floating into any potential dangerous areas, Stan anchors the home using Roger's wine/cocaine fridge; however the anchoring system also acts as a hinge and rotates the house upside-down, partially submerging it underwater.

Roger cries when his date falls to the floor and gets impaled by a moose antler chandelier (only because she is wearing his favourite sweater). Stan, Hayley, Jeff and Klaus head to the attic for higher ground, but it starts to flood. Hayley tries to open the door, but fails due to Roger's boxes and items blocking it. Klaus, believing he can go wherever he wants, insults the Smiths and jumps out of the fishbowl into the water, but his skin burns due to the water being ocean water; Hayley puts Klaus back in his fishbowl. Francine, Steve, and Roger make a rope out of curtains to get them out of the attic after removing the boxes. Roger picks up his wigs instead of Klaus, leaving Klaus behind. Francine suggests that their rope to the first floor doesn't provide much strength, so she convinces the family to climb it one at a time. Unfortunately, Jeff panics and jumps onto the rope, with Steve still hanging on, tearing it down, and angering Hayley, as the Smiths are now stuck on the second floor of the tipped-over house.

As the storm worsens, the family becomes increasingly frightened and distrustful of Stan when his idea to open another window to let them float to the top results in Hayley being taken by a great white shark. With the shark loose in the house, the family fights for survival. Steve fails to hide his pornography from his mother, while Roger drowns his date upon discovering she is still alive. After Stan separates himself from the family, they find Hayley, but are trapped on the sofa while the shark circles them. Stan loses hope and admits Francine's suggestions are better than his own, until Klaus gives him an encouragement speech by comparing him to Nicolas Cage: despite his failure in several movies, Cage eventually made a successful film (which Klaus believes to be National Treasure: Book of Secrets). He suggests Stan will eventually make the right decision after his many failures, inspiring Stan to prove himself reliable in a crisis once more.

Stan obtains a grizzly bear from the zoo to battle the shark, which only further aggravates the situation when the two animals work together to kill the family. He then attempts to electrocute the animals, but accidentally electrocutes Roger instead. Refusing to accept Francine's pleas just to get help, Stan instead throws his old college javelin which, instead of killing the bear, accidentally impales Francine in the shoulder, to Stan's horror. Buckle enters the house with a tranquilizer gun and sedates the two predators before also shooting Stan, realizing that he was an equal threat. As the Hurricane passes away, Stan later tells Buckle that he made the right call. Francine comforts Stan by assuring him he is a good husband and father in all other aspects of life, but despite the whole ordeal, Stan is not convinced that he should stay out of a future crisis.

After the storm clears, Stan looks out to scope the damage done by the storm, only to find himself in a stand-off with Cleveland Brown and Peter Griffin, whose houses have ended up on both sides of the Smiths' house, since the same animation hit their respective towns earlier. Cleveland then tries to tell Peter he knows him, but the latter tells them to let him think. When Francine comes out the front door, Stan accidentally shoots her, which Peter claims to be "classic American Dad!" due to its unpredictability.

== Production ==
"There were talks initially of doing a crossover with all the characters from all the shows but it became a little bit of a conundrum because you have three different staffs, each of whom is used to writing three different sets of characters. This idea of an outside force that sweeps its way through all three shows seemed like a cool way to accomplish that.

— Seth MacFarlane, in an interview with The Hollywood Reporter

The episode was first announced in July 2010 by series creator Seth MacFarlane at San Diego Comic-Con. Kevin Reilly, the entertainment president of the Fox Broadcasting Company, originally pitched the idea for the crossover, which was inspired by theme nights of comedy shows from the 1980s. MacFarlane described the crossover event to be an "enormous challenge" and a "substantial undertaking"; he chose to do one central story line so that each writing staff would not have to write stories for unfamiliar characters. He was also willing to do another crossover event if this one received successful ratings.

Much of the episode plot in "Hurricane!" was modeled after the action adventure disaster film, The Poseidon Adventure. In his interview on the plot of the final part of the crossover episode, Mike Barker, a producer for American Dad, stated that "[they] end up flooding the house and turning it upside down." He continued: "Ultimately, the house drifts and ends up in the same neighborhood as the Griffin and Brown homes." The actual crossing over of the event occurs at the end of this episode when Stan gets involved in a stand off with Cleveland Brown of The Cleveland Show and Peter Griffin of Family Guy.

In April 2011, executives of the Fox Broadcasting Company officially announced that "Hurricane!" would air on May 1 as part of the Night of the Hurricane crossover, along with The Cleveland Show episode "The Hurricane!" and Family Guy episode "Seahorse Seashell Party". However, on April 29, it was announced that the crossover event would be removed from the schedule, in response to a series of tornadoes that killed nearly 300 people in the Southern United States. The crossover was subsequently replaced by reruns of "I Am the Walrus" from American Dad!, "Brian Writes a Bestseller" from Family Guy, and "Ain't Nothin' But Mutton Bustin'" from The Cleveland Show. MacFarlane later agreed with the decisions after being consulted with the executives of Fox, and a spokeswoman for the company later announced that the episode would air the succeeding season.

Guest appearances of "Hurricane!"

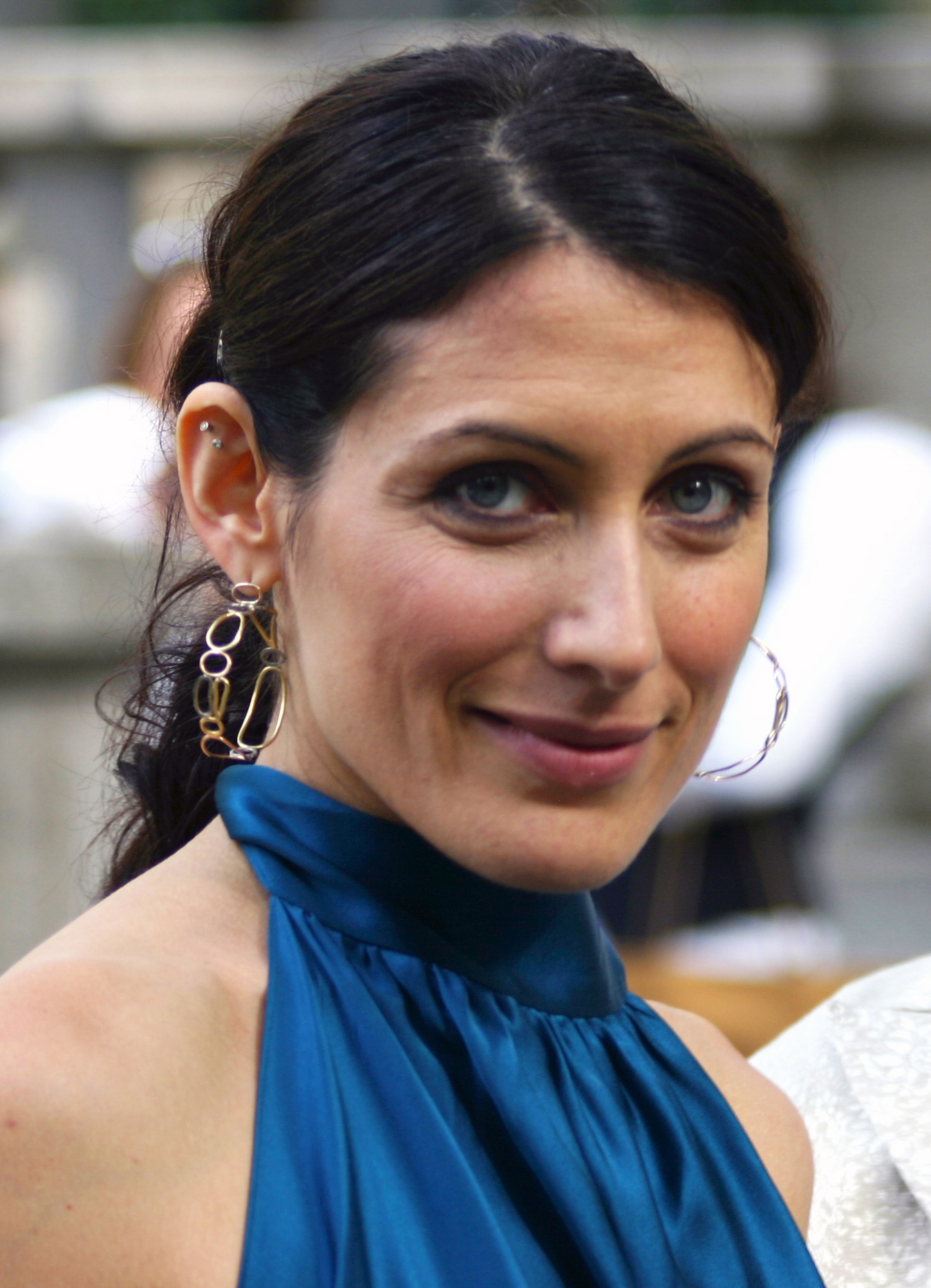
Lisa Edelstein reprised her role as Shari, having last done so in the season six episode "Best Little Horror House in Langley Falls".

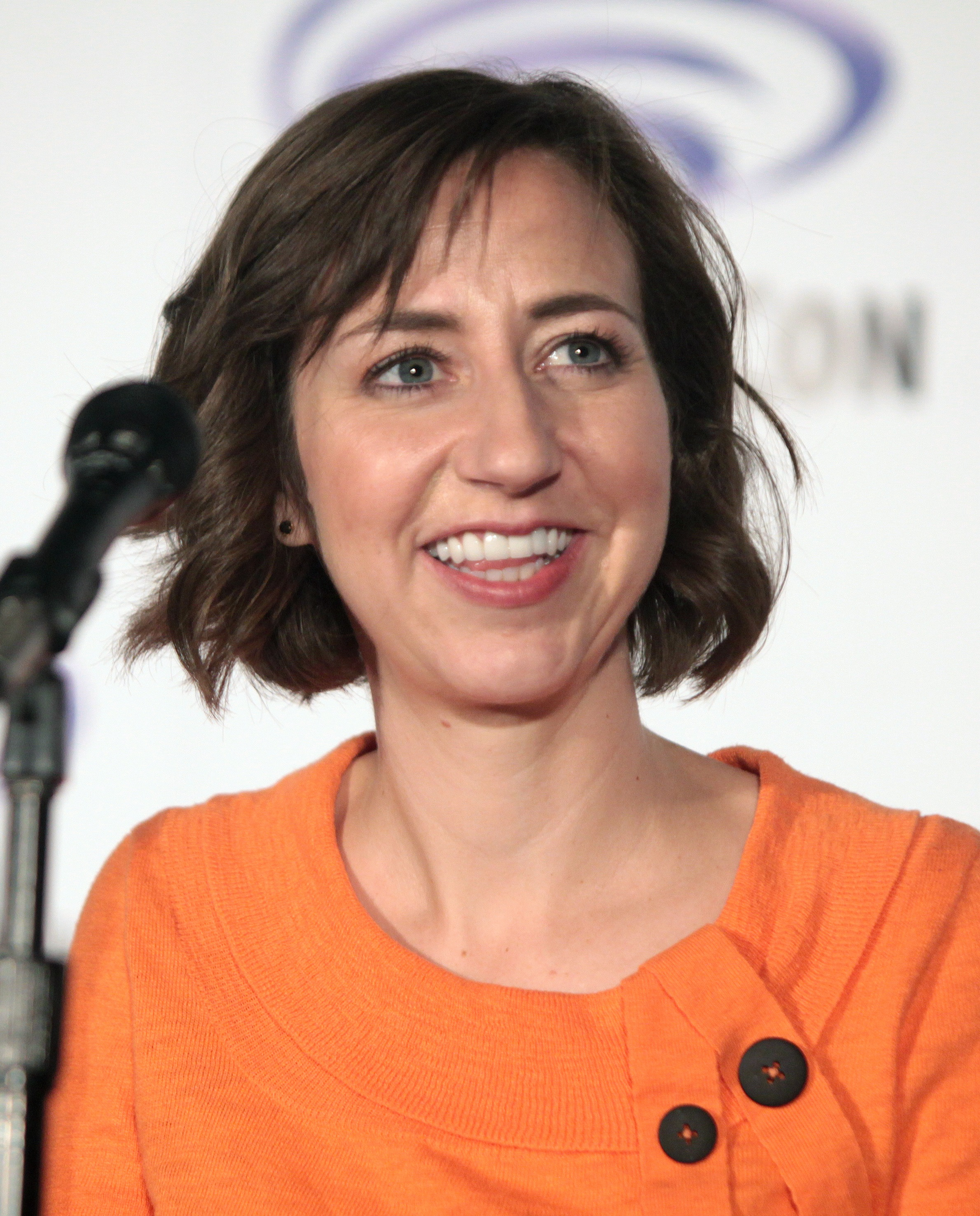
Kristen Schaal made her first appearance on American Dad!, guest starring as Roger's one-night stand.

"Hurricane!" was directed by Tim Parsons, in his first directing credit of the season. This episode marked the first time Parsons has directed an American Dad! episode since the seventh season episode "I Am the Walrus". It was written by Erik Sommers, which also served as his first writing credit for the season. Sommers' last production credit was the sixth season episode "You Debt Your Life". In addition to the regular cast, voice actor Mike Henry, actress Lisa Edelstein and voice actress Kristen Schaal guest starred in the episode as Cleveland Brown, Sharri Rothberg, and Roger's One Night Stand respectively. Recurring voice actors Jeff Fischer, Mike Barker, Matt McKenna, and Kevin Michael Richardson reprised their roles of Jeff Fischer, Terry Bates, Buckle, and Principal Brian Lewis respectively. In addition to his American Dad! roles of Stan, Roger, and Greg Corbin, MacFarlane reprised his Family Guy role of Peter Griffin, while Henry guest starred as his role of Cleveland Brown. This episode marked the first time Henry made a guest appearance on American Dad since the season four episode "Stan's Night Out". Edelstein and McKenna reprised their roles of Shari and Buckle, having last done so in the season seven episode "Best Little Horror House in Langley Falls".

== Reception ==
=== Ratings ===
"Hurricane!" first aired in the United States on October 2, 2011 as part of the animation television night on Fox. It was preceded by episodes of The Simpsons, and its sister shows The Cleveland Show and Family Guy. It was viewed by 5.71 million viewers upon its initial airing, despite simultaneously airing with Desperate Housewives on ABC, The Amazing Race on CBS, and a match between the Baltimore Ravens and the New York Jets on NBC. Total viewership for the episode was the third highest of the animation television block on Fox, having moderately higher ratings than that of The Cleveland Show but lower ratings than that of The Simpsons and Family Guy. "Hurricane!" garnered a 2.6/6 rating in the 18–49 demographic, according to Nielsen ratings. Total viewership and ratings were slightly down from the previous episode, "Hot Water", which was watched by 5.83 million viewers and garnered a 3.0/7 rating in the 18–49 demographic.

=== Television reviews ===
Critics generally praised the episode, with many deeming "Hurricane!" as the best part of the crossover. Terron Moore of Ology praised the episode, giving it an 8.5 out of ten rating. Points of acclaim went to the humor of the episode, to which Moore opined that it "was packed with a lot of funny lines, a lot of ridiculous Stan antics [...], and a pretty funny arc involving Roger and his girlfriend".

Rowan Kaiser of The A.V. Club was polarized with the episode. Although she stated that the episode was not bad, Kaiser stated that it "didn't quite work". Kaiser went on to give the episode a 'B−' grade, scoring higher than the Family Guy episode "Seahorse Seashell Party", but lower than The Simpsons episode "Bart Stops to Smell the Roosevelts". Another writer felt that the interactions between Stan and Francine were inferior to previous episodes of the series and wrote, "It breaks away from Francine and Stan's fun relationship and veers into the more conventional cartoon relationship, where the husband is a buffoon and the wife has to keep him check."

== See also ==
- Night of the Hurricane
- The Cleveland Show: "The Hurricane!"
- Family Guy: "Seahorse Seashell Party"
