= The Hurricane! =

- The Cleveland Show episode
- Episode no.: Season 3 Episode 2
- Directed by: Ron Rubio
- Written by: Kirker Butler
- Production code: 2APS20
- Original air date: October 2, 2011

Guest appearances
- Edward Asner as The Narrator; John Slattery as Mayor Larry Box

Episode chronology
← Previous "BFFs"	Next → "Nightmare on Grace Street"
- The Cleveland Show season 3

"The Hurricane!" is the second episode of the third season of the animated comedy series The Cleveland Show and 45th episode overall. Written by Kirker Butler and directed by Ron Rubio, the episode first aired on Fox in the United States on October 2, 2011. In the episode, the Brown/Tubbs family cancel their vacations plans due to a hurricane. Meanwhille, Cleveland Jr. shocks the family saying that he doesn't believe in God.

The episode is the first part of the Night of the Hurricane block with Family Guy and American Dad!, the first such event in the animated television line-up of Fox. Seth MacFarlane was initially approached by Kevin Reilly, the president of the entertainment division of Fox, with the idea of a crossover. The episode was first announced at the 2010 San Diego Comic-Con, and was originally scheduled to air on May 1, 2011 as the twenty-first episode for the second season, but was delayed until October 2, 2011 because of the 2011 Super Outbreak.

== Plot ==
As the Brown/Tubbs family prepares to head for a cruise, a news report states that a hurricane, named Flozell, hits Stoolbend. Not deterred, the family tries to salvage what is left of their vacation. However Cleveland discovers that Donna doesn't stock food in the house long-term, to which she points out that he trashed what little food they had.

When the family tries to pray to God to help them ride out the storm, Cleveland, Jr. shocks everyone by revealing that he does not believe in God. He started questioning things when his mother Loretta told him that Jesus forgave her for her affair with Glenn Quagmire, and after a while, he stopped believing in God, although he claims he is not an atheist either as he views it as "another religion", pointing out that some atheists, such as Brian Griffin, have been just as condescending and judgmental as the religions they deride. The family members attempt to persuade Cleveland, Jr. through reason, emotional appeal, and even a production number, but instead find their own senses of religion and faith tested.

As the storm worsens, an increasingly hungry family confronts Cleveland, Jr. when they discover he had food stored in his room. Cleveland, Jr. explains that, as the only one who heard of the storm beforehand, he used a very scientific method to ration the food. When the family is still resistant to his non-religious lifestyle, accusing him of wanting the food all to himself, Cleveland, Jr. locks the food away in spite. Cleveland calls on God to smite Cleveland, Jr. for his actions, at which point a tree crashes through the house and pins him instead of his son. The family members are unable to lift the tree by hand and decide to pray to God for help. Cleveland, Jr. is able to rig together a pulley system and lifts the tree using his own weight. The family disagrees over whether God was involved in Cleveland, Jr.'s actions and the belief of Cleveland, Jr. is left unresolved as the hurricane heads for Quahog.

== Production and development ==
"There were talks initially of doing a crossover with all the characters from all the shows but it became a little bit of a conundrum because you have three different staffs, each of whom is used to writing three different sets of characters. This idea of an outside force that sweeps its way through all three shows seemed like a cool way to accomplish that.

— Seth MacFarlane, in an interview with The Hollywood Reporter

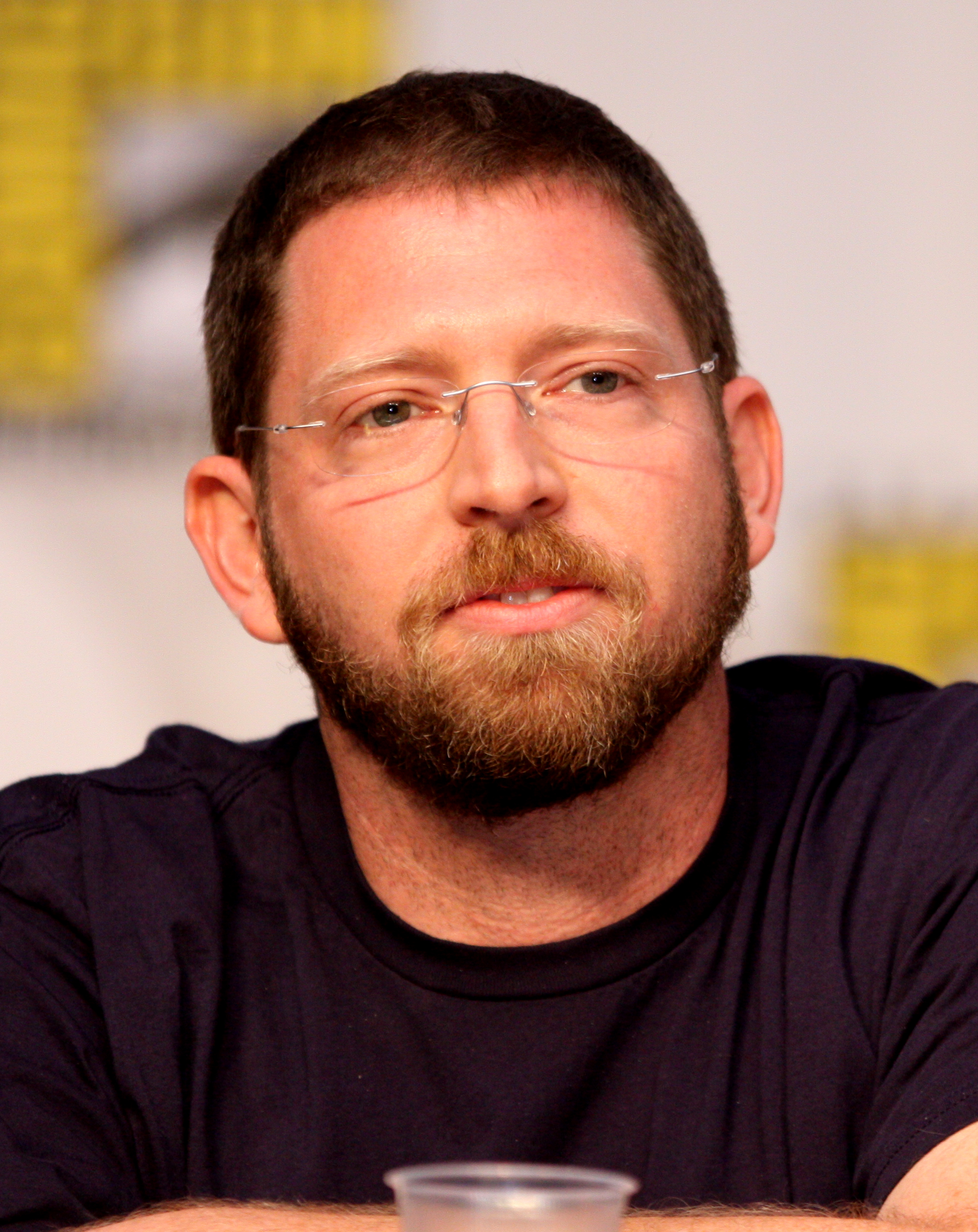
Kirker Butler wrote the episode.

The crossover event was first announced in July 2010 by series creator Seth MacFarlane at San Diego Comic-Con. It was the first of its kind in the history of the animated television line-up on Fox. Kevin Reilly, the entertainment president of the Fox Broadcasting Company, originally pitched the idea for the crossover, which was inspired by theme nights of comedy shows from the 1980s. MacFarlane described the crossover event to be an "enormous challenge" and a "substantial undertaking"; he chose to do one central story line so that each writing staff would not have to write stories for unfamiliar characters. He was also willing to do another crossover event if this one receives successful ratings.

In April 2011, the executives of the Fox Broadcasting Company officially announced that the episode would air on May 1 as part of the Night of the Hurricane crossover, alongside the Family Guy episode "Seahorse Seashell Party" and the American Dad! episode "Hurricane!". However, on April 29, it was announced that the crossover event would be removed from the schedule, in response to a series of tornadoes that killed nearly 300 people in the Southern United States. The crossover was subsequently replaced by repeats of "I Am the Walrus" from American Dad!, "Brian Writes a Bestseller" from Family Guy, and "Ain't Nothin' But Mutton Bustin'" from The Cleveland Show. MacFarlane later agreed with the decisions after being consulted with the executives of Fox, and a spokeswoman for the company later announced that the episode would air the succeeding season.

== Reception ==
=== Ratings ===
"The Hurricane!" first aired in the United States on October 2, 2011 as part of the animation television night on Fox. It was preceded by episodes of The Simpsons, and its sister shows American Dad! and Family Guy. It was viewed by 4.73 million viewers upon its initial airing, despite simultaneously airing with Desperate Housewives on ABC, The Amazing Race on CBS, and a match between the Baltimore Ravens and the New York Jets on NBC. "The Hurricane!" garnered a 2.6/6 rating in the 18-49 demographic, according to the Nielsen ratings.

== See also ==
- Night of the Hurricane
- Family Guy: "Seahorse Seashell Party"
- American Dad!: "Hurricane!"
