= Seahorse Seashell Party =

- Family Guy episode
- Stewie attempts to console Brian as he hallucinates
- Episode no.: Season 10; Episode 2
- Directed by: Brian Iles
- Written by: Wellesley Wild
- Production code: 8ACX20
- Original air date: October 2, 2011

Guest appearances
- Ioan Gruffudd as Narrator; Dee Bradley Baker as Hooded Monster; Colin Ford as kid; Debra Wilson as black woman; Kat Purgal

Episode chronology
← Previous "Lottery Fever"	Next → "Screams of Silence: The Story of Brenda Q"
- Family Guy season 10

"Seahorse Seashell Party" is the second episode of the tenth season of the American animated television series Family Guy, and the 167th episode overall. It originally aired on Fox in the United States on October 2, 2011. The episode mainly centers around the Griffins, who are riding out an oncoming hurricane. In their attempt to pass the time, they participate in numerous activities and games. After being condemned by her family yet again, Meg, having had enough of being bullied over the years, loses her temper and confronts them for their abusiveness, eventually leading the entire family to turn their rage on each other. Meanwhile, Brian secretly consumes magic mushrooms which causes him to have hallucinations.

"Seahorse Seashell Party" is the second part of the Night of the Hurricane block with The Cleveland Show and American Dad!. The episode was first announced by Seth MacFarlane at the 2010 San Diego Comic-Con. It was written by Wellesley Wild and directed by Brian Iles. Originally scheduled to air on May 1, 2011, as the sixteenth episode of the ninth season of Family Guy, the episode was postponed due to the 2011 Super Outbreak subsequently coinciding with the timing of the scheduled episodes.

Reception of "Seahorse Seashell Party" by television critics has been negative, with its humor and main plot being the most criticized. An estimated 6.91 million viewers tuned into the episode upon its initial airing, while also garnering a 3.5/8 rating in the 18–49 demographic according to the Nielsen ratings. The episode featured guest performances by Ioan Gruffudd, Dee Bradley Baker, Debra Wilson, Colin Ford, and Kat Purgal, along with several recurring guest voice actors for the series.

== Plot ==
As a hurricane approaches Quahog, the Griffins prepare for its arrival. In an attempt to pass the time, Brian decides to take magic mushrooms, to Stewie's surprise. As the mushrooms start to take effect, he begins hallucinating, leading to him inadvertently cutting off his own ear. Stewie tries to help Brian by staying by his side all night and taking care of him. When Brian falls asleep, he has a surreal nightmare in which he is attacked by monstrous beings resembling the Griffins and Quagmire. Brian gradually comes back to lucidity after Stewie takes him downstairs to drink some water.

Meanwhile, the rest of the family attempts to pass the time by playing charades and various other games, but are unable to keep themselves entertained and take their frustrations out on Meg. Having had enough of their abuse over the years, Meg loses her temper and turns on the other members of the family. She starts with Chris, calling him out for his bullying treatment of her and how he never takes her side against their parents. When Lois tries to tell her that she is taking her problems out on everyone else, Meg brings up Lois's criminal history and tells her that she is the antithesis of the perfect mother. Meg also informs Lois that when she turns eighteen, she is considering never seeing her again, leaving her in tears. Finally, Meg confronts Peter and calls him out for his destructive tendencies and how he would go to prison if anyone in the real world witnessed his treatment of her, calling him a "waste of a man". Shocked, Peter demands Lois make Meg stop, but Lois refuses because he did not stand up for her.

Within moments, the whole family turn their own abusive criticisms against each other until a devastated and tearful Peter flees upstairs, leaving Meg and Brian alone to discuss the situation. Despite Brian commending her for standing up for herself, Meg feels remorse for hurting her family's feelings and concludes that they cannot survive without a "lightning rod" to endure their antagonism and absorb all their dysfunction. She decides to mend fences by apologizing to Peter, Lois and Chris for taking her own problems out on them, restoring their egos, personalities and original opinions - with everyone hugging at the end.

Stewie then breaks the fourth wall by telling the audience about drug use and advising them to visit their local library for more information.

== Production and development ==
"There were talks initially of doing a crossover with all the characters from all the shows but it became a little bit of a conundrum because you have three different staffs, each of whom is used to writing three different sets of characters. This idea of an outside force that sweeps its way through all three shows seemed like a cool way to accomplish that."

— Seth MacFarlane, in an interview with The Hollywood Reporter

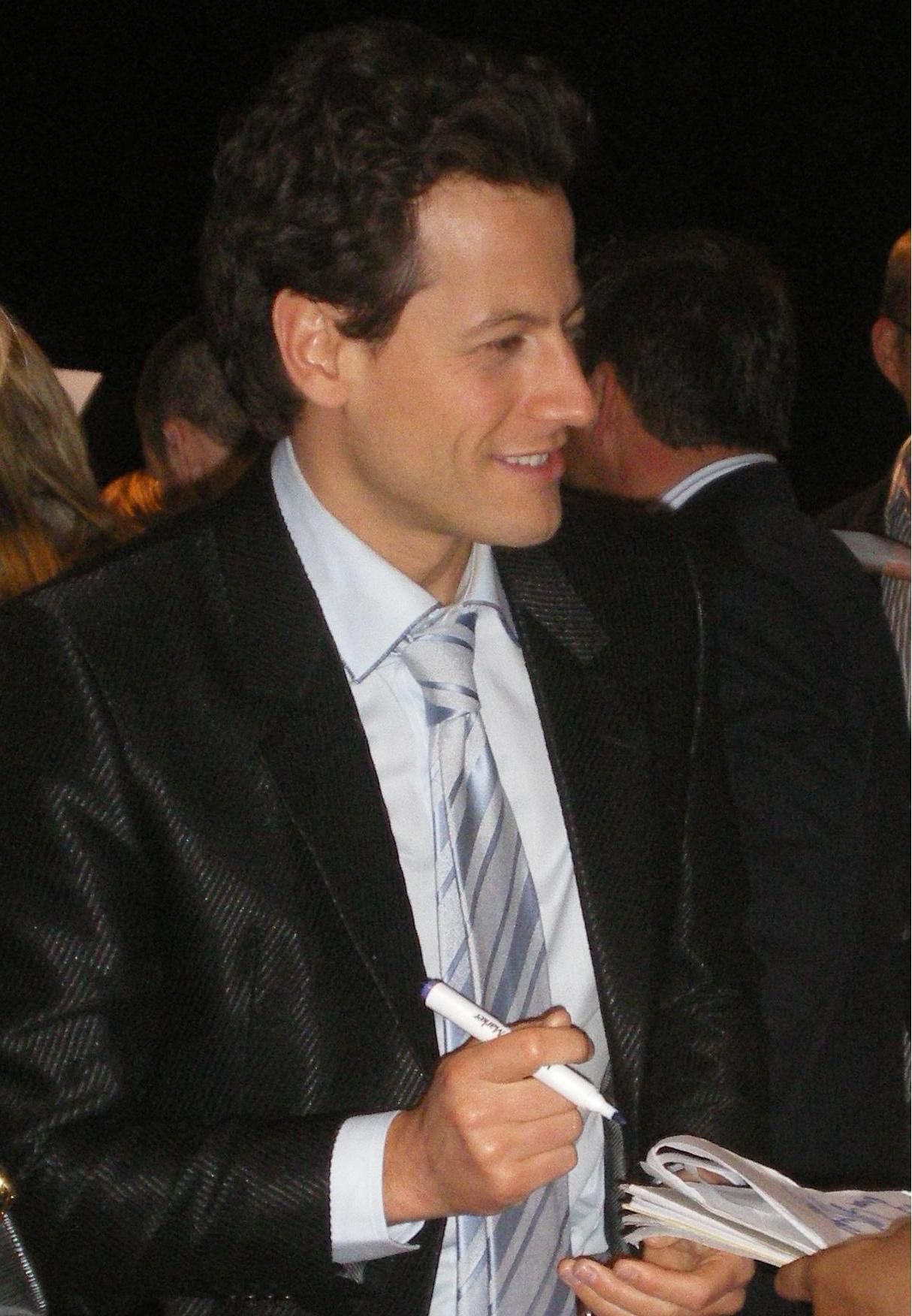
Ioan Gruffudd made a guest appearance as the narrator in the episode.

The episode was first announced in July 2010 by series creator Seth MacFarlane at San Diego Comic-Con. Kevin Reilly, the entertainment president of the Fox Broadcasting Company, originally pitched the idea for the crossover, which was inspired by theme nights of comedy shows from the 1980s. MacFarlane described the crossover event to be an "enormous challenge" and a "substantial undertaking"; he chose to do one central story line so that each writing staff would not have to write stories for unfamiliar characters. MacFarlane was also willing to do another crossover event if this one receives successful ratings.

In April 2011, executives of the Fox Broadcasting Company officially announced that "Seahorse Seashell Party" would air on May 1. However, on April 29, it was announced that the crossover event would be removed from the schedule, in response to a series of tornadoes that killed nearly 300 people in the Southern United States. The episodes were subsequently replaced by repeats of "I Am the Walrus" from American Dad!, "Brian Writes a Bestseller" from Family Guy, and "Ain't Nothin' But Mutton Bustin'" from The Cleveland Show. MacFarlane agreed with the decisions after consulting with the executives of Fox, and a spokeswoman for the company later announced that the episodes would air the following season.

"Seahorse Seashell Party" was written by Wellesley Wild and directed by Brian Iles. It features guest appearances from Ioan Gruffudd, Dee Bradley Baker, Colin Ford, and Debra Wilson. This episode marked Gruffudd's first guest appearance since the season eight episode "The Splendid Source" and Wilson's first guest appearance since the season three episode "And the Wiener Is...".

== Cultural references ==
"Seahorse Seashell Party" features several references to media, music, film, and other pop culture phenomena. The episode's title references dialogue from the viral video "Drinking out of Cups" by electronic musician and composer Dan Deacon.

Peter mentions wanting to watch "G.I. José," which leads to a cutaway parodying the G.I. Joe: A Real American Hero public service announcements with a Mexican version of the title character. Peter mentions the film Fletch while playing charades. One of the many passing-time gags involves Peter performing a sing-a-long to the opening chase music from Indiana Jones and the Last Crusade. As Brian's hallucinations begin to worsen, Stewie attempts to calm him, reminding him that seeing Lady Gaga nude was a worst-case scenario. A cutaway gag involving a confrontation between an African American woman and an Italian American man parodies the National Geographic's documentaries. A reference to the social networking site Twitter was also made by Stewie.

== Reception ==
"Seahorse Seashell Party" first aired in the United States on October 2, 2011 as part of the animation television night on Fox. It was preceded by episodes of The Simpsons and The Cleveland Show, while being followed by an episode of American Dad!. It was viewed by 6.91 million viewers upon its initial airing, despite simultaneously airing with Desperate Housewives on ABC, The Amazing Race on CBS, and a game between the Baltimore Ravens and the New York Jets on NBC. Total viewership for the episode was the highest out of its respective line-up. "Seahorse Seashell Party" garnered a 3.5/8 rating in the 18–49 demographic, according to the Nielsen ratings, also becoming the highest rating of the animation television night on Fox. Total viewership and ratings were significantly down from the previous episode, "Lottery Fever", which was watched by 7.69 million viewers and garnered a 4.1/9 rating in the 18–49 demographic.

The main plot of "Seahorse Seashell Party" was panned by critics (particularly the ending). Kevin McFarland of The A.V. Club wrote of the episode, "This far into the show’s run, shifting to a much more dramatic bottle episode and reaching for emotional payoffs felt far too little too late." He resumed: "Nobody cares about any member of the Griffin family the way we care about every last Simpson. I feel bad about Meg becoming the scapegoat. Not because she’s a good character, but because instead of tweaking and working to make her appreciated or comically valuable, Family Guy spent years going down the path of least resistance and simply joined the fan chorus of hatred. One episode of pointed, forced justification for that shift doesn’t change a thing." McFarland concluded his review by giving the episode a grade of D+. Similarly, Terron Moore of Ology felt that much of the episode was wasted. In his review, Moore stated that "Seahorse Seashell Party" was "an episode that spends a lot of time addressing something that didn’t need to be addressed." He gave the episode a 4.5 out of ten points. TV Fanatic's Kate Moon was less negative of the episode, stating that even though Meg confronting her family in regards to her treatment was long overdue, she concluded that it felt contrived and uninteresting.

Critics were polarized with the episode subplot. While McFarland expressed enjoyment of some of the animation of the episode, he asserted that it "fell flat". Moon exclaimed that the subplot would have been more interesting had Stewie ingested the mushrooms alongside Brian.

The episode debuted in the United Kingdom on May 20, 2012, and achieved 1.6 million viewers.

== See also ==
- Night of the Hurricane
- "The Hurricane!", the related episode of The Cleveland Show
- "Hurricane!", the related episode of American Dad!
