= Toy Whorey =

- American Dad! episode
- Episode no.: Season 8 Episode 18
- Directed by: Tim Parsons; Jennifer Graves
- Written by: Matt Fusfeld; Alex Cuthbertson
- Production code: 7AJN01
- Original air date: May 13, 2012

Episode chronology
← Previous "Ricky Spanish"	Next → "Love, AD Style"
- American Dad! season 8

"Toy Whorey" is the eighteenth episode and season finale of the eighth season of the animated comedy series American Dad!. It aired on Fox in the United States on May 13, 2012. The episode plot mainly revolves around Stan trying to stop his fourteen-year-old son, Steve from playing with toys. The title and Steve's fantasy parodies Toy Story.

This episode was written by Matt Fusfeld and Alex Cuthbertson and directed by Tim Parsons and Jennifer Graves. This episode generally received positive reviews. Kevin McFarland from The A.V. Club rated this episode a B−.

== Plot ==
Stan gets tired of Steve's playing and insists that it is time he becomes an adult. Stan hatches a plot to get rid of Steve's toys but Steve overhears and thwarts Stan's plan. When Klaus suggests that Steve will lose interest in toys after he loses his virginity, Stan decides to take Steve to Mexico to have sex with a prostitute. On the way, Stan becomes annoyed when he discovers Steve has brought one of his toys. When they arrive at the brothel, Steve declines intercourse. Stan also finds his car's tires have been stolen. Getting a ride, they find that their chauffeurs are a drug cartel and are kidnapped.

Stan becomes despondent in captivity, but Steve improvises a toy to make Stan eat and keep his strength up. Stan eventually joins Steve's fantasy and regains hope. When Steve sees his kidnappers are also suffering, he invites them into his fantasy, managing to trap them in the cell while he and Stan escape. Impressed by his son's resilience, Stan realizes Steve uses make-believe to escape the harshness of reality and grudgingly accepts the need for play. As they throw away the makeshift toy, a cockroach named Pedro, it complains about being abandoned.

Meanwhile, Francine falls at the store and gets free steaks. Roger offers to get some wine but finds he is out and goes out, crashing his car in the process. Arriving at the wine store, he finds the bottle he wants has been sold to Greg and Terry. He goes to see them about getting the wine but they refuse to let go of it. Roger continues to try but fails. Frustrated, Francine goes over and helps herself to the wine but when she opens the bottle she is knocked through the wall by one of Roger's traps allowing Roger to take both steaks.

== Reception ==
"Toy Whorey" first aired on May 13, 2012, in the United States as part of the animated television night on Fox. Like most of the season, the episode was last in the animation television line-up. It was preceded by episodes of The Simpsons, Bob's Burgers, and its sister shows Family Guy and The Cleveland Show. This episode was watched by 4.13 million U.S. viewers, with a 2.0/5 rating share in the 18-49 demographic group.

Kevin McFarland of The A.V. Club gave the episode a B− saying: "'Toy Whorey' isn't intended as a finale due to the nature of animation production cycles, but it's a lesser version of other episodes this season. 'Wheels & The Legman And The Case Of Grandpa's Key' more effectively used whimsical fantasy; 'The Scarlett Getter' used every character and had a great guest star, and the aforementioned 'Virtual In-Stanity' was a more emotionally affecting father/son plot with bigger laughs." Dyanamaria Leifsson of TV Equals gave the episode a positive review saying: "What Stan couldn't realize until the end of their adventures, was that while Steve still enjoyed using his imagination and playing with toys, he was not necessarily immature. Steve is interested in girls, he's got friends, and he's got hobbies. Still, in keeping with the typical American Dad structure for plots that revolve around Stan, he was incapable of realizing these things until he had put everyone through hell so he could learn that lesson on his own terms."
