= A Ward Show =

- American Dad! episode
- Episode no.: Season 8 Episode 3
- Directed by: Josue Cervantes
- Written by: Erik Durbin
- Production code: 6AJN01
- Original air date: November 6, 2011

Guest appearances
- Anjelica Huston as Ellen Riggs; Sally Struthers as Clara

Episode chronology
← Previous "Hurricane!"	Next → "The Worst Stan"
- American Dad! season 8

"A Ward Show" is the third episode of the eighth season of the animated comedy series American Dad! It aired on Fox in the United States on November 6, 2011. The episode's plot mainly revolves around Roger becoming Steve's legal guardian, but he gets a little overzealous in the parenting department. Meanwhile, Stan and Francine decide to go on a vacation to Flash Flood Acres, The Largest Water Park in the Universe. But after spending two hours there they go on every ride, so they decide to get a refund from the manager, but fail when they learn he would not be back until Thursday.

This episode was written by Erik Durbin and directed by Josue Cervantes. This episode generally received positive reviews. Rowan Kaiser from The A.V. Club rated this episode a Grade B+. During its initial airing, the episode was viewed by 4.85 million households and achieved a 1.6 rating in the 18-49 demographic, according to the Nielson ratings. It featured a guest appearance from Anjelica Huston and Sally Struthers, as well as several recurring voice actors and actresses for the series.

== Plot ==
Steve is friends with Principal Brian Lewis. In return, Steve also helps him with his accounting, and they belittle the teaching staff. Later, Roger becomes Steve's legal guardian so Stan and Francine can get out of a coffee meeting with Lewis. At the meeting, Roger attacks Principal Lewis for Steve's poor test scores. Not satisfied, Roger later brings in the superintendent, and they see that Lewis is taking Steve out of classes for get-togethers in the teacher's lounge, and as a result, he is fired. When Steve protests that Principal Lewis is his friend, Roger tries to make up for this by getting him a new friend named Freddie. Later, the other teachers unleash their wrath on Steve as payback now that Lewis is not around anymore; Roger responds to this by rigging their cars with explosives, killing them. Steve is extremely angry with Roger for getting Lewis fired and runs away. He meets up with Lewis and the two drive away to Arizona. However, on the way, Lewis reveals that he is driving the car into the Grand Canyon in a murder-suicide and reveals that he only used Steve to be his accountant. Freddie runs into Roger searching for Steve and unleashes an eye-popping scream when Roger panics. Freddie explains that Roger should let Steve make more of his own decisions and refrain smothering him as much. Roger catches up with Steve and Lewis before they can drive into the canyon, but he only came to apologize to Steve. Lewis then drives over the canyon, but Roger's love makes the car fly across the canyon. But then they crash the car in mid-air after a white guy with a black kid also tries to drive into the canyon. Both Steve and Lewis end up in the hospital, with Lewis saying that he was wrong to use Steve as an accountant, and that he now enjoys living as he goes to get a sponge bath from a nurse.

Meanwhile, after making Roger Steve's legal guardian, Stan and Francine decide to go on a vacation to "Flash Flood Acres, The Largest Water Park in the Universe!" But after just two hours there, they go on every ride, so they decide to get a refund from the manager, but fail when they learn he would not be back until Thursday. So they try to sell their 8-day passes, but after that fails, they decide to get even with the park by having sex in the biggest water slide. But when Stan comes in too fast, he and Francine end up in the same hospital as Steve and Principal Lewis with broken pelvises. When Roger takes away Steve's pain medicine, Steve, Stan and Francine start to argue with him until he brings in Freddie to quiet them down with another eye-popping scream.

== Production ==
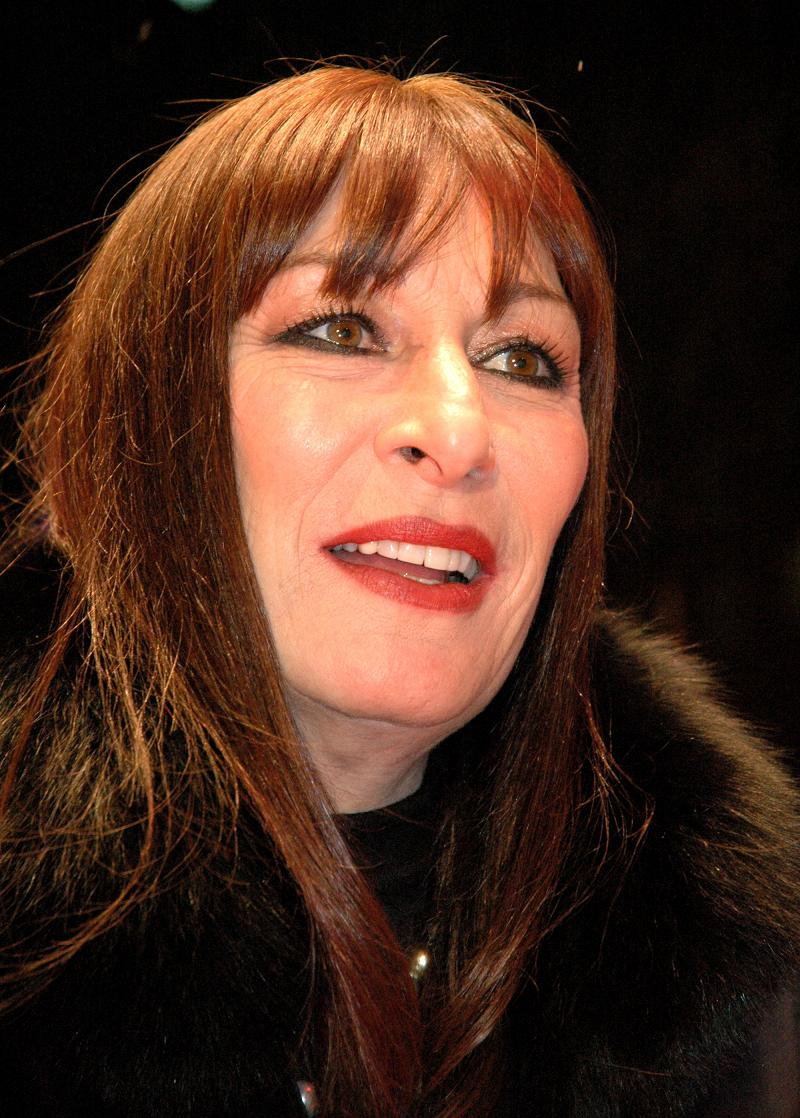
Anjelica Huston made a guest appearance in this episode.

This episode was written by Erik Durbin and directed by Josue Cervantes. Seth MacFarlane, the creator and executive producer of American Dad!, as well as its sister shows Family Guy and The Cleveland Show, served as the executive producer for the episode, along with series veterans Mike Barker, Rick Wiener, Matt Weitzman, and Kenny Schwartz. In addition to the regular cast, Anjelica Huston guest starred in this episode. Also appearing in this episode was Sally Struthers.

== Reception ==
Rowan Kaiser of The A.V. Club gave the episode a B+, saying "What makes this episode work is that it has a reasonably coherent storyline combined with a consistent level of humor. The jokes land. I can't really go in-depth more than that, which is always a problem with reviews, but I'll do my best. For example, after Roger presents his plan to become Steve's guardian with a "La-la!", Francine replies "Roger, couple things. I think you meant to say 'voila!' instead of 'la-la!'" which garners a quick, subtle "I did." It's an odd little joke, relying almost entirely on the effectiveness of the sound editing, but it, like a high level of jokes in the episode, manages to work."

Dyanamaria Leifsson of TV Equals gave the episode a positive review, saying "Roger is not likely to have the desire to be a father again soon, but I loved seeing him in that overprotective, overbearing parental role with Steve who is normally his partner in crime. The two of them were the source of a ton of great lines and little laugh out loud moments and as a result I thoroughly enjoyed tonight’s episode of American Dad."

The episode was watched by a total of 4.85 million people, receiving a 2.5 rating/6% share in the 18-49 demographic, this made it the third most watched show on Animation Domination that night, beating Allen Gregory but losing to Family Guy and The Simpsons with 8.00 million.
