= The Cleveland Show season 3 =

The Cleveland Show
- Season 3
- DVD cover
- No. of episodes: 22

Release
- Original network: Fox
- Original release: September 25, 2011 – May 20, 2012

Season chronology
- ← Previous; Season 2 Next → Season 4

The third season of The Cleveland Show aired on the Fox network from September 25, 2011, to May 20, 2012. On June 10, 2010, it was announced that the series had been renewed for a third season. According to co-creator Mike Henry, musical guests in season three were originally to include Kanye West, will.i.am, Nicki Minaj, Bruno Mars, Chris Brown, Darren Criss, Questlove, and Fergie. With the exception of Fergie and Darren Criss, these guests' appearances were instead in season four. The hurricane-themed crossover episode with Family Guy and American Dad! aired on October 2, 2011. It was originally going to air in the second season, but was postponed due to the 2011 Super Outbreak in the Southern United States.

== Cast and characters ==
- Mike Henry as Cleveland Brown and Rallo Tubbs
- Sanaa Lathan as Donna Tubbs Brown
- Reagan Gomez-Preston as Roberta Tubbs
- Kevin Michael Richardson as Cleveland Brown Jr.

== Episode list ==
No. overall	No. in season	Title	Directed by	Written by	Original release date	Prod. code	US viewers (millions)
44	1	"BFFs"	Steve Robertson	Kirker Butler	September 25, 2011	3APS01	6.13
Cleveland is upset when he finds out that his best friend Peter Griffin came to Stoolbend and did not call him to hang out. In an effort to bond with the guys, Cleveland takes them on a camping trip hosted by guest star Ric Flair. Meanwhile, Rallo competes in a Quiz Bowl.
45	2	"The Hurricane!"	Ron Rubio	Kirker Butler	October 2, 2011	2APS20	5.56
When a storm hits Stoolbend, Cleveland Jr. makes a shocking proclamation: He doesn't believe in God. This episode begins a crossover event titled Night of the Hurricane that continues on Family Guy season 10 episode 2 and concludes on American Dad! season 8 episode 2.
46	3	"Nightmare on Grace Street"	Phil Allora	Jonathan Green & Gabe Miller	October 30, 2011	3APS04	4.66
Donna makes Cleveland and Rallo spend the night in a haunted house. Meanwhile, Cleveland's new friend goes on a murderous rampage and Roberta is stuck in love triangle between a vampire and a wolf.
47	4	"Skip Day"	Jack Perkins	Dave Jeser & Matt Silverstein	November 20, 2011	3APS03	3.86
Cleveland is embarrassed when he learns that Cleveland, Jr. was the only student to attend school on "skip day". Meanwhile, Rallo gets in a hit-and-run accident with Kendra and her scooter.
48	5	"Yemen Party"	Seung-Woo Cha	Julius Sharpe	November 27, 2011	3APS02	3.67
When Donna joins a women's support group and starts to complain about how Cleveland treats her, Cleveland dresses up as a woman to infiltrate the group and show Donna how good her life really is. Meanwhile, Cleveland Jr. and Rallo join forces to stop the playground bully, Rodney.
49	6	"Sex and the Biddy"	Ron Rubio	Aseem Batra	December 4, 2011	3APS06	5.47
When Murray gets a girlfriend named Hazel, Rallo discovers she is after Murray's money and tries to save him from making a costly mistake. Donna signs Cleveland up for the gym but instead of working out, he takes a lazy short-cut to achieve results.
50	7	"Die Semi-Hard"	Seung-Woo Cha	John Viener	December 11, 2011	3APS10	5.07
While staging their own live nativity scene, Cleveland tells his family his version of the Die Hard narrative. This is the first episode parodying a film.
51	8	"Y Tu Junior Tambien"	Jack Perkins	Aaron Lee	January 8, 2012	3APS11	4.48
When Junior starts dating a very attractive young lady named Cecelia, Cleveland is suspicious of her motives, as well as being green with envy because Junior has one-upped him. When things start to get serious between the two lovers, Cleveland suspects that the young woman is using Junior to get a green card. But it goes too far. Lester calls the immigration agency, and in an attempt to keep Cecelia in the country, Cleveland Jr. marries Cecelia and moves out. Meanwhile, Junior attempts to get used to living on his own.
52	9	"There Goes El Neighborhood"	Ron Rubio	Courtney Lilly	January 29, 2012	3APS14	2.75
After getting himself into several cultural misunderstandings with his new and popular Latina neighbor, Cleveland attempts to make amends by demonstrating his knowledge of Latino culture. But Cleveland gets into a bind when he offers to babysit Choni's son and winds up losing him. Meanwhile, Junior sets up his new wife Cecelia on a Valentine's Day date but his jealousy gets the best of him.
53	10	"Dancing with the Stools"	Anthony Agrusa	Matt Murray	February 12, 2012	3APS05	2.72
Determined to claim the first place trophy at the annual "Dancing with the Stools" ballroom dance competition, Donna recruits Cleveland Jr. to be her partner. But their hopes of taking home the big prize misses a beat when Cleveland Jr. professes his love for Donna just moments before their well-rehearsed routine. Meanwhile, Roberta babysits Rallo for a week, and learns that domestic responsibilities are not as easy as they seem.
54	11	"Brown Magic"	Anthony Agrusa	Chadd Gindin	February 19, 2012	3APS13	2.61
Excited to spend quality father-stepson bonding time with Rallo, Cleveland takes Rallo to his very first magic show, where they get hired to be the opening act. Thanks to Rallo's sharp wit in the role of the puppet, Cleveland and Rallo's ventriloquist act becomes a hit. As their act gets rave reviews by fans and ventriloquist critic Graham Kensington, Rallo grows tired of Cleveland taking all the credit for their success. Not one to be taken for a dummy, Rallo proves that he is the heart of their comedic act.
55	12	"'Til Deaf"	Oreste Canestrelli	Aaron Lee	March 4, 2012	3APS07	3.11
When Donna has a midlife crisis, Cleveland must come up with a clever way to sneak off with his buddies on a hunting trip without her finding out. But a hunting accident leaves Cleveland slightly deaf, and his scheme to agree to all of Donna's ideas backfire when she makes a drastic life change and decides to go back to school. Meanwhile, Junior is up for an easy reelection as Student Body President, until Roberta decides to run against him.
56	13	"Das Shrimp Boot"	Oreste Canestrelli	John Viener	March 11, 2012	3APS15	3.35
Cleveland relies on energy supplements to keep himself awake in order to work overtime and earn enough vacation time to go to a Spring Break cruise with his family. But when his energy pill addiction forces him into rehab and his desperate attempt to escape to the cruise liner goes wrong, he finds himself held hostage by pirates threatening the safety of those aboard the ship, including his own family.
57	14	"March Dadness"	Ian Graham	Jonathan Green & Gabe Miller	March 18, 2012	3APS16	3.22
Rallo's viewing of Tim Gunn's reality show is interrupted when Cleveland decides to watch the college basketball tournament with Freight Train, but he quickly becomes frustrated when Freight Train enjoys spending quality bonding time with Cleveland Jr. instead. Once Cleveland learns the real reason behind Freight Train's cold attitude, he is determined to find a new father figure and goes head-to-head against his dad and Cleveland Jr. in the two-man golf tournament. Meanwhile, Rallo purchases a fancy sports car, but his speedy ride with his buddies takes a dangerous drive off-course.
58	15	"The Men in Me"	Steve Robertson	Clarence Livingston	March 25, 2012	3APS09	3.12
Cleveland is labeled "The Whitest Black Man in America" after he wins a dance competition for the chance to attend a pop sensation's concert. Unable to shake off his new reputation, Cleveland is determined to understand his roots and where he came from. Everything starts to make sense when he is reunited with his former nanny Barbara (voiced by Florence Henderson), a high class woman with a taste for refined culture. But even though Cleveland's nanny influenced many of his interests growing up, Cleveland finally learns that happiness comes from being comfortable in your own skin.
59	16	"Frapp Attack!"	Phil Allora	Kevin Biggins & Travis Bowe	April 1, 2012	3APS12	2.87
After Donna becomes jealous when Cleveland gets too close to a female co-worker, a music video made from footage of his workplace shenanigans goes viral and attracts the attention of a big-time music producer. He is attracted to Donna as well, making Cleveland jealous.
60	17	"American Prankster"	Seung-Woo Cha	Bill Oakley	April 15, 2012	3APS18	4.34
One of Rallo's pranks goes too far and gets Cleveland, Jr. kicked out of the scouts. Cleveland takes matters into his own hands and threatens to send Rallo to juvenile detention, but things backfire when Rallo runs away.
61	18	"B.M.O.C."	Steve Robertson	Kirker Butler	April 29, 2012	3APS17	3.12
It is Homecoming Weekend at Cleveland's alma mater, so he volunteers to accompany Roberta on a college visit as an excuse to relive his crazy college days. But when Cleveland's fraternity chapter gives him a less-than-brotherly welcome, Roberta comes to the rescue and discovers a bright future in higher education. Meanwhile, Rallo helps Cleveland, Jr. learn to sleep with his beloved stuffed animal.
62	19	"Jesus Walks"	Phil Allora	Kirker Butler	April 29, 2012	3APS20	4.06
Devout church choir girl Vanessa (Fergie) catches Cleveland, Jr.'s eye, and he eagerly volunteers to go on a church trip to be in her good graces. Vanessa's fellow choir member, Hunter (Darren Criss), confronts him for going to church for the wrong reasons, but the tables turn when Vanessa winds up being a handful for the boys. Meanwhile, Donna's ex-boyfriend returns home from Iraq and discovers that she is married.
63	20	"Flush of Genius"	Jack Perkins	Aaron Lee	May 6, 2012	3APS19	3.11
Cleveland Jr. profiles his dad for a report on his favorite American, but when Cleveland falls off the toilet and suffers a concussion, he loses Cleveland Jr.'s admiration. Meanwhile, Rallo gets excited when he realises he has grown tall enough to ride his favorite roller coaster.
64	21	"Mama Drama"	Anthony Agrusa	Chadd Gindin	May 13, 2012	3APS21	2.79
Hoping to lift Donna's spirits on Mother's Day, Cleveland hires an actress to play Donna's estranged mother, Dee Dee Tubbs (Phylicia Rashād). But when an unexpected event leads the real Dee Dee to find Cleveland, he stages one last effort to reunite Donna with her mother, and the unlikely meeting helps the two women forge a new mother-daughter bond.
65	22	"All You Can Eat"	Ian Graham	Story by : Aseem Batra & Bill Oakley; Teleplay by : Aseem Batra	May 20, 2012	3APS24	3.01
After Cleveland Jr. gets bullied by Oliver Wilkerson and his gang again, Roberta gives him a makeover, and his stylish new look gives him the confidence to approach Daisy, a misfit who catches his attention. But when Daisy mistakes Cleveland Jr. for a woman, they decide to make a statement and go to the prom as a gay couple. Meanwhile, Cleveland's authority as his favorite snack food's ultimate expert is threatened by another fan.

== Reception ==
Unlike the first season, this season received a more positive reception, in comparison to the first season. The Rotten Tomatoes score is a 63%, a 19% improvement over the previous season.

== Home media ==
The Complete Season Three
Set Details
22 episodes; 3-disc set; Widescreen: 1.78:1; Languages: English only (no subtitles); Uncensored audio; Note: In Region 1 the collection was manufactured on demand (MOD), releasing on DVD-R only.
Release dates
Region 1	Region 2/4
March 1, 2013	-
