= American Dad! season 8 =

American Dad!
- Season 8
- Region 1 cover art for "Volume 8"
- Starring: Seth MacFarlane; Wendy Schaal; Scott Grimes; Rachael MacFarlane; Dee Bradley Baker
- No. of episodes: 18

Release
- Original network: Fox
- Original release: September 25, 2011 – May 13, 2012

Season chronology
- ← Previous; Season 7 Next → Season 9

The eighth season of the American TV series American Dad! originally aired on Fox from September 25, 2011, to May 13, 2012, and consisted of 18 episodes. On February 23, 2011, it was announced that the series had been renewed for an eighth production cycle.

During the season, Roger travels to the Middle East to support the troops and meets Ricky Martin, Francine gets jealous with Stan's old flame and starts a catchphrase legacy, The Smith family adopts a new puppy and buys a new hot tub, Stan is cursed to living life as an old man, and attempts to fulfill his dream of being a best man by making Principal Lewis marry the school's superintendent, Hayley and Jeff adopting a demon baby, and make a bet with Stan that he and Francine can live on minimum wage for a month. Guest stars of the season include Cee Lo Green, Gabourey Sidibe, Kristen Schaal, Sarah Natochenny, Kathy Griffin, Anjelica Huston, Elisabeth Shue, Andrea Martin, Scott Foley, Sharon Lawrence, Sarah Michelle Gellar, David Boreanaz, Michael Peña, Emily Deschanel, Hulk Hogan, Rose Byrne, and Cheech Marin.

Also, the hurricane-themed crossover episode titled "Hurricane!" with The Cleveland Show and Family Guy would have aired the previous season but was postponed due to the 2011 Super Outbreak in the Southern United States. It later aired on October 2, 2011.

== Episodes ==
| No. overall | No. in season | Title | Directed by | Written by | Original release date | Prod. code | U.S. viewers (millions) |
|---|---|---|---|---|---|---|---|
| 116 | 1 | "Hot Water" | Chris Bennett | Judah Miller & Murray Miller | September 25, 2011 | 6AJN18 | 5.83 |
Cee-Lo Green narrates this twisted tale of Stan buying a hot tub to relieve his daily stress, only to get into hot water when the hot tub begins killing his family and friends.
| 117 | 2 | "Hurricane!" | Tim Parsons | Erik Sommers | October 2, 2011 | 6AJN07 | 5.80 |
Stan tries to protect his family from a hurricane that's hitting Langley Falls, but every increasingly poor decision Stan makes endangers the family more than the actual storm. Note: This episode concludes a crossover event titled Night of the Hurricane that begins on The Cleveland Show season 3 episode 2 and continues on Family Guy season 10 episode 2.
| 118 | 3 | "A Ward Show" | Josue Cervantes | Erik Durbin | November 6, 2011 | 6AJN01 | 4.85 |
Roger becomes Steve's legal guardian, but gets overzealous in the parenting department with one part of it getting Principal Lewis fired. Meanwhile, Stan and Francine go to the nation's biggest water park -- and immediately get bored with it after riding every ride within the span of two hours.
| 119 | 4 | "The Worst Stan" | Rodney Clouden | Nahnatchka Khan | November 13, 2011 | 6AJN11 | 4.87 |
When Stan realizes that he might never fulfill his dream of becoming a best man, he convinces his last single friend, Principal Lewis to marry the school's Superintendent (played by guest star Anjelica Huston) and to choose him as his Best Man. Stan invites Lewis' old friend from prison to the wedding only to discover a secret that could prevent the wedding from happening at all. Meanwhile, Roger finds the perfect pair of shorts in a strange room inside a Ross Discount Clothing Store and vacations in Miami, where he meets Latin pop singer Ricky Martin.
| 120 | 5 | "Virtual In-Stanity" | Shawn Murray | Jordan Blum & Parker Deay | November 20, 2011 | 6AJN16 | 4.82 |
After discovering that he has never been there for Steve while growing up, Stan decides to use the CIA's avatar system to pose as a hot, blond teenage girl -- whom Steve plans to have sex with at the school dance. Meanwhile, Roger starts his own limo service, and when a group of frat boys "drive and dash," he goes on a manhunt to get his revenge.
| 121 | 6 | "The Scarlett Getter" | Josue Cervantes | Matt Fusfeld & Alex Cuthbertson | November 27, 2011 | 6AJN09 | 4.48 |
When Stan runs into his former crush from CIA boot camp, his affection for her resurfaces, which drives Francine into a jealous frenzy. Francine convinces Roger to take up his best bachelor persona to try and separate the two. It works, until Stan discovers that Scarlett (his former crush) is actually the best alien hunter in the CIA who knew Stan was harboring Roger. Meanwhile, Steve (in a rush to get dressed for school) slips on Hayley's panties and is stricken with good luck -- until Snot takes them away to satiate his obsession for Steve's sister. When Steve accidentally reveals to Hayley that Snot has her panties, she breaks into Snot's bathroom and brutally beats him up to steal them back.
| 122 | 7 | "Season's Beatings" | Joe Daniello | Erik Sommers | December 11, 2011 | 6AJN21 | 5.00 |
In this year's Christmas episode, Stan finds himself excommunicated from Christianity after news hits that he beat up Jesus (or rather, Roger dressed up as Jesus) during the town's Christmas pageant. Meanwhile, Hayley and Jeff adopt a child who may be the spawn of Satan.
| 123 | 8 | "The Unbrave One" | Joe Daniello | Rick Wiener & Kenny Schwartz | January 8, 2012 | 6AJN13 | 4.79 |
After being branded a coward by Stan for not helping him during a movie theater fight, Steve takes Roger's advice and dresses up as a superhero, but the plan goes pearshape when Roger is the one who reveals that he's Langley Falls' local crimefighter. Meanwhile, Francine worries over being pregnant and gets dubious advice from an Internet physician known as "Dr. Vadgers."
| 124 | 9 | "Stanny Tendergrass" | Tim Parsons | Keith Heisler | January 29, 2012 | 6AJN15 | 4.77 |
Stan puts Steve to work at the Harvercamp country club as a groundskeeper to show him the true meaning of hard work. Steve then discovers the owner of the club, Mr. Vanderhill, is actually one of Roger's personas and also the only one Stan can't see through. Meanwhile, Francine -- with Klaus's help -- tries to come up with a memorable catchphrase. Their final result is "Looks like things are getting too spicy for the pepper!"
| 125 | 10 | "Wheels & the Legman and the Case of Grandpa's Key" | Josue Cervantes | Laura McCreary | February 12, 2012 | 6AJN17 | 3.59 |
Stan joins Roger and Steve's fictional detective agency, but he ruins the fun by being extremely incompetent at his "job". Roger demands that Steve fire Stan, but Steve cannot bring himself to do it and ends up lying to Roger. Things take a turn for the worse when Stan ends tied up and tape-gagged during one of their "jobs", forcing Steve to go to town on how pathetic Roger's detective agency is.
| 126 | 11 | "Old Stan in the Mountain" | Pam Cooke & Valerie Fletcher | Jonathan Fener | February 19, 2012 | 6AJN14 | 4.43 |
While waiting in line behind an old man to get hiking equipment for a trip with Steve and Hayley up Mount Kiliminjaro, Stan begins rudely insulting an elderly man in a wheelchair. The man, visibly angered, utters a latin hex that curses Stan to live as an old man. Unable to cope with the lifestyle of the elderly, Stan goes to drastic measures to reverse the hex. Meanwhile, Roger takes Francine on a road trip to a dance competition -- which turns out to be a plot involving a dead redhead, Roger's tenacious desire to have an authentic red wig and one of his old personas. Francine reaches a breaking point.
| 127 | 12 | "The Wrestler" | Rodney Clouden | Alan R. Cohen & Alan Freedland | March 4, 2012 | 6AJN19 | 4.29 |
When Barry threatens Stan's old high school wrestling record, Stan enlists Roger to beat Barry and defend his small claim to fame. However, Stan is caught off-guard when Roger (under the persona of a fake Russian wrestler named Demitri Krotchliknioff) turns out to be the threat to Stan's high school record. The two promptly duel for 10 days on the wrestling mat. Eventually Francine shows up and reveals she talked Roger into breaking Stan's record to prove a point to Stan.
| 128 | 13 | "Dr. Klaustus" | John Aoshima & Jansen Yee | Brian Boyle | March 11, 2012 | 6AJN12 | 4.62 |
Roger acts as the Smiths' family therapist Dr. Penguin (first seen on "Man on the Moonbounce" as a prison therapist), while Klaus watches each visit. Klaus eventually becomes irritated after watching Dr. Penguin convince the Smiths to repress their many repressed emotions. This leads him to trick Roger into switching into his Sgt. Pepper persona by sending him a fake deployment notice from the US Military. After Roger runs off to clean latrines in Iraq as Sgt. Pepper, Klaus takes over and ends up driving the family apart by revealing their horrible secrets (Stan's hatred of Francine's food and habit of dumping it in a secret shaft full of ravenous wolves, Francine stealing Stan's money to buy drugs, Steve using Greg and Terry as his alternate parents in order to score with a girl and avoid embarrassment, Hayley playing Ultimate Frisbee with someone else because of Jeff's lack of athletic ability, and Jeff having a crush on Francine). Unable to control the outbursts he caused, Klaus opts to bring back Roger to help straighten out the issues. Roger then conveys all of Klaus's suggestions to the Smiths about solving their issues and reminding the Smiths that Klaus needs to be taken seriously. Not like a pet fish.
| 129 | 14 | "Stan's Best Friend" | John Aoshima & Jansen Yee | Jonathan Fener | March 18, 2012 | 6AJN20 | 4.61 |
Despite Stan's objections, Francine buys Steve the dog he has always wanted (despite that the family has already adopted two dogs: the 19-year-old walking corpse that Stan accidentally shot on the pilot episode and Fussy the dog in "Not Particularly Desperate Housewives", which Stan denies were only dreams). However, when the dog, Kisses, suffers a horrific accident, Stan refuses to take the pup off life support because of a traumatic childhood incident with his first dog, Freddy. He takes Kisses to a deranged vet who fixes him in a nightmarish Frankenstein way, and whose new look traumatizes the family. In his dreams, Stan reunites with Freddy in dog heaven, who convinces him that Kisses should die as this is no way for a dog to live, and that Stan is only doing this to run away from the pain. That morning, Stan blows up Kisses, releasing Stan from his suffering and sending Kisses to heaven to hang with Freddy. Meanwhile, after seeing Stan's dog on life support, Hayley and Jeff see a lawyer to plan out their last wishes and wills -- and Hayley discovers that Jeff holds the rights to Blues Travelers' first album master tapes, which he gave to the daughter of an old woman he married years ago. Hoping to obtain the tapes for cash, Hayley embarks on a road trip to bring them back. They find her and their lawyer asks her to marry him, knowing full well it is only for the money. Note: This episode was dedicated Freddy Fener a dog belonging to series writer Jonathan Fener.
| 130 | 15 | "Less Money, Mo' Problems" | Chris Bennett | Murray Miller & Judah Miller | March 25, 2012 | 6AJN02 | 4.28 |
After losing patience with Hayley and Jeff for their freeloading ways, Stan bets the young couple that he and Francine can live on minimum wage for a month, but it starts to look like Jeff and Hayley could be right when Francine gives up on the deal and Stan becomes a homeless jenkem addict. Meanwhile, Steve and Roger embark on a mission to test drive a Ferrari after hearing that Klaus had one back when he was human.
| 131 | 16 | "The Kidney Stays in the Picture" | Pam Cooke & Valerie Fletcher | Rick Wiener & Kenny Schwartz | April 1, 2012 | 6AJN22 | 4.18 |
When Hayley is put in the hospital for kidney failure (caused when Francine's old college friend comes to town and talks Hayley into drinking massive amounts of booze), Stan discovers during a donor search that he might not be Hayley's real father. Stan, using an experimental CIA time machine, takes Francine with him and goes back to the mid-1990s to find the man who possibly impregnated Francine. They also find coat midgets.
| 132 | 17 | "Ricky Spanish" | Shawn Murray | Erik Sommers | May 6, 2012 | 7AJN02 | 4.82 |
While going through his costumes in the closet, Roger finds the costume of the worst persona he's ever done: Ricky Spanish. Meanwhile, Stan and Francine's sponsored child from Africa comes to visit them and eventually drives them mad.
| 133 | 18 | "Toy Whorey" | Tim Parsons & Jennifer Graves | Matt Fusfeld & Alex Cuthbertson | May 13, 2012 | 7AJN01 | 4.13 |
Tired of his son acting childish by playing with toys and using his imagination, Stan takes Steve to Mexico to make a man out of him by having sex with a prostitute, but the trip turns deadly when they get abducted by drug runners. Meanwhile, Roger sets out to steal a rare bottle of wine that Greg and Terry bought from a French wine shop.

== Home media release ==
All eighteen episodes of the eighth season were released on DVD by 20th Century Fox Home Entertainment in Region 2 on August 5, 2013, in Region 4 on August 21, 2013, and in Region 1 on September 24, 2013. This 3-disc box set includes all 18 episodes of Season 8, along with commentaries on select episodes, deleted scenes, and "Stan's Booty Dance."

American Dad Volume 8 release dates
| Region 1 | September 24, 2013 |
| Region 2 | August 5, 2013 |
| Region 4 | August 21, 2013 |
