= Plim Plim =

Argentine children's TV series

- Genre: Preschool
- Created by: Guillermo Pino; Claudio Pousada
- Directed by: Guillermo Pino; Claudio Pousada
- Voices of: Natalia Rosminati; Natalia Pupato; Judith Cabral; Valeria Gomez; Lucila Gomez
- Opening theme: Welcome
- Ending theme: Plim Plim Orquestra
- Country of origin: Argentina
- Original languages: Spanish; Portuguese; English
- No. of seasons: 3
- No. of episodes: 60

Production
- Running time: 7 minutes
- Production companies: Que Lindo Entertainment; Disney Media Networks

Original release
- Network: Disney Junior; Universal Kids
- Release: 21 September 2011 – 21 November 2016

Plim Plim is an Argentine series of children's folk songs. It was later adapted into an animated television series created by Guillermo Pino and Claudio Pousada, and produced by Smilehood, broadcast on Disney Junior for all Latin America. The pre-release was aired on 21 September 2011 and was officially launched on 1 October of the same year. The animated series consists of 7-minute-long episodes which promotes human values such as solidarity, honesty, responsibility, early habits and respect for the environment. The show was also dubbed in English.

A new music style named FunKids was created for the series, which is a fusion between rhythms and styles as varied as funk, circus, and Balkan music.

== Synopsis ==
The series revolves around the adventures of Plim Plim, a child who combines the features of a clown, hero and a magician. He accompanies his friends and teaches positive values as well as how to take care of the planet through setting examples. "Plim Plim Clown, Hero's heart", is based on the essence of each one of these values, analysing the nuances which make them different and reinforces them to achieve a simple, direct and effective education, keeping a dynamic balance between learning and entertainment.

Plim Plim helps his friends whenever they face situations that cannot be taken care of at school, and leads them to a magical world where the characters have fun and learn lessons, too. Plim Plim is a child embodying enthusiasm and positivity, whose stories are portrayed as fables, including all sorts of visual and musical traits that result in the creation of multi-target content which also attracts parents and educators.

== Characters ==
=== Magical characters ===
Plim Plim is the protagonist of the series. He is a boy who combines the features of a clown, a hero, and a magician, and is the only human present. He shows up magically from a magical space-time, and is generous, valiant, enthusiastic, and well-intentioned. His characteristic phrases are "Of course you do!" and "You got it!".

Wichiwichi Wichiwi is a little canary bird, Plim Plim's boon companion and messenger. His language sounds exactly like his name, but instead whistles. He carries messages from Plim Plim and belongs in the same magical world. Nobody knows how he comes or how he goes, and is the link between Plim Plim and the children and is always interacting with them. Sometimes he is shown to be clumsy.

Tuni is a magical car that can be transformed into an airplane, a helicopter, a boat, a submarine, an adventure machine, and even a bus, adjusting to the need of the challenge at hand.

=== Other characters ===
Nesho is an orange elephant, he has large ears and wears brown glasses and blue shirt and pants. His name has an oriental origin. He is intellectual, deductive, smart, structured, and orderly. He is known to be slow and gifted, however, he has a great memory. His favourite instrument is the tuba, and his characteristic phrase is "How curious!".

Bam is a bear. He is sweet, cute, fun-loving, and very sensory. His name has Latin origins. His favourite instrument is the drum, and his characteristic phrase is "Delicious!".

Acuarela is a small rabbit who loves art. She is cheerful, imaginative, dreamy, and permanently enamoured. Acuarela does have the tendency to be forgetful and easily loses her concentration. She is a fan of all things of European origins. Her favourite instrument is the xylophone, and her characteristic phrase is "I love it!".

Mei-Li is a cat. She is coquette, dynamic, athletic, and vigorous. She is very anxious, and does everything quickly. Her name has Chinese origins and means "beautiful". Her favourite instrument is the keytar, and her characteristic phrase is "Yes! Yeah! Yeah! Yeah!".

Hoggie is a pig who likes to contradict everybody. He is characterized by being moody, grumpy, and selfish. His name has an Anglo-Saxon origin and means "pig" in English. He is a n athlete and a musician. His favourite instrument is the saxophone, and his characteristic phrase is "Me neither".

Miss Arafa is a giraffe. She is the sweet, sympathetic, and motherly teacher, and is the only adult in the series. Her name is revered as Giraffa. She imparts her modicum of wisdom and motherly care, and her favourite phrase is "Good luck!".

Sun is a character who looks at everything happening around them and follows the actions of the characters with their gestures.

Character's preferences

Character	Instrument	Color
Acuarella	Xylophone	Red
Bam	Drum	Yellow
Hoggie	Saxophone	Green
Nesho	Bass horn	Blue
Mei-li	Keytar	Pink

== Dubbing ==
Character	Original Voices in Spanish
Plim Plim	Natalia Rosminati
Nesho	Natalia Rosminati
Bam	Natalia Pupato
Acuarella	Natalia Pupato
Mei Li	Judith Cabral
Hoggie	Valeria Gómez
Arafa	Lucila Gómez

Character	Dubbing Actors in America
Plim Plim	Lisa Grossman (US)
Nesho	Ulises Otero (US)
Bam	Camilla Carrasco (US)
Acuarella	Debbie Ramos (US)
Mei Li	Christina Jopling (US)
Hoggie	Christina Jopling (US)
Arafa	Lisa Grossman (US)

== Nominations ==
- 2013 Martín Fierro Awards
  - Best program for kids
