= Hot Water (American Dad!) =

- American Dad! episode
- Episode no.: Season 7 Episode 1
- Directed by: Chris Bennett
- Written by: Judah Miller; Murray Miller
- Production code: 6AJN18
- Original air date: September 25, 2011

Guest appearances
- CeeLo Green as himself (live action) and Hot Tub; Gabourey Sidibe as Party Girl; Sy Smith as The Hot Tub Singers; Michael Peña as Maguerite

Episode chronology
← Previous "Gorillas in the Mist"	Next → "Hurricane!"
- American Dad! season 8

"Hot Water" is the eighth season premiere of the American animated comedy series American Dad!. It aired on Fox on September 25, 2011, and is written by brothers Judah Miller and Murray Miller and directed by Chris Bennett. It was nominated for the Emmy Award for Outstanding Animated Program (for Programming Less Than One Hour).

This episode, narrated by CeeLo Green, is a parody musical of Little Shop of Horrors. It follows Stan buying a hot tub to relieve his daily stress, only to get into hot water when the hot tub begins killing his family and friends.

The song "Daddy's Gone" was performed by Scott Grimes (Steve) and Seth MacFarlane (Roger), and was made available for download at iTunes shortly after the episode aired.

== Plot ==
Stressed out by his family and his obligations, Stan allows Principal Lewis to take him shopping for a hot tub at the Little Shop of Hot Tubs. Stan is drawn to a used hot tub in the store's back room that the salesman, Maguerite, tries to talk him out of purchasing. Stan ignores him, buying the hot tub and taking it home with him. There, he learns that the hot tub can talk and sing, tempting Stan into using it ("Dip a Toe"). This eventually leads to him and Francine having their most intense sex through their vivid sexual fantasy ("Hot Tub of Love").

Francine starts to worry about the hot tub's effect on Stan and orders him to stay out of it. That night, the tub draws Stan to it, leading Francine to give Stan an ultimatum: the tub or her ("Do Whatever You Like"). When Stan chooses the tub, Francine packs the rest of the family and leaves for her parents' house ("Daddy's Gone"). Still unable to shake his suspicions about the hot tub, Maguerite investigates its past, learning that it came alive after being struck by lightning and killed its original owner. It later escaped from a mental hospital ("Research").

Maguerite and Principal Lewis go to Stan's house, where the hot tub swallows Lewis and causes an escaping Maguerite to crash his car, killing him. The hot tub then draws Francine back home, imitating Stan on the phone. Stan discovers the deception and returns home just as the hot tub swallows Francine. After the hot tub explains its first killing spree, Stan unsuccessfully tries to recover Francine. The hot tub jettisons Stan through the roof, leaving him sprawled on the pavement across the street ("Psychotic Hot Tub"). At the last moment, Stan remembers the "Spa Down" given by Maguerite for "calming down" his tub; however, he succumbs to his wounds. Cee Lo Green, who was narrating the whole episode, announces that Stan is dead before saying "Good Night", ending the episode abruptly with a cliffhanger.

== Production ==
This episode was written by Judah Miller and Murray Miller and directed by Chris Bennett. This would be the second-season premiere of American Dad! to be written by the Millers, the first being "In Country...Club". During the "Evening with American Dad" panel with the show's staff that took place at the Paley Center on September 22, 2011, executive producer Mike Barker revealed that there was a time that they thought that the show was not going to be renewed and thought that this was going to be the final episode, saying: "We thought, 'What better way to end the series? Kill the main character!'"

== Reception ==
Rowan Kaiser The A.V. Club gave the episode a B+, saying "American Dad used tonight's season premiere to establish itself as the weird middle sibling of the Fox animated shows. Right now, it's probably also the best of them". Dyanamaria Leifsson of TV Equals gave the episode a positive review, saying "The plot line quickly went from somewhat standard American Dad fare to just plain crazy as we discovered that the hot tub was alive and had escaped from a mental institution. I would not have thought twice about this development if this had been a Halloween special, but I was definitely not expecting everyone to die at the end of the episode."

The episode was watched by a total of 5.83 million people, this made it the fourth most watched show on Animation Domination that night, losing to The Cleveland Show, Family Guy and The Simpsons with 8.08 million. The episode was nominated for a 2012 Primetime Emmy Award for Outstanding Animated Program, but lost to the Penguins of Madagascar episode "The Return of the Revenge of Dr. Blowhole".
