= Kevin Reilly (executive) =

American television executive

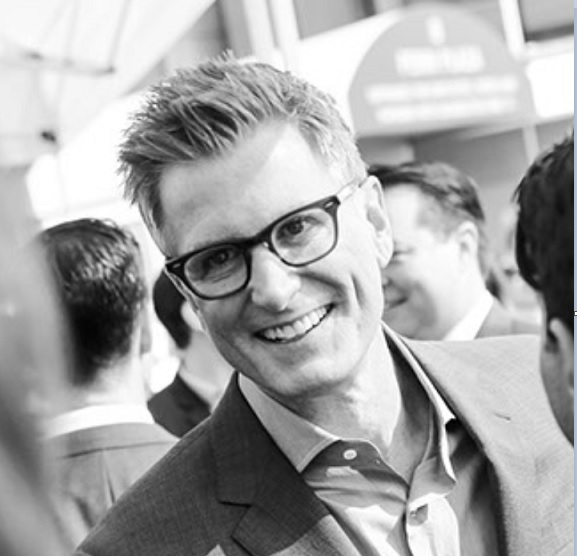
- Reilly in May 2017
- Born: 1962 (age 63–64); Manhasset, New York
- Education: Cornell University
- Occupation: Media Executive
- Known for: Former CCO of HBO Max and president of TNT, TBS, and truTV

Kevin Reilly (born 1962) is an American media executive who served as the Chief Content Officer of HBO Max and the president of TNT, TBS, and truTV. In addition to his position at WarnerMedia, Reilly has also held executive positions at FX, NBC, and Fox, and has championed successful programs such as The Sopranos, Empire, The Office, 30 Rock, Friday Night Lights, The Shield, ER, Law & Order and Glee, among others.

== Early life and education ==
Reilly is a Long Island native who was born in Manhasset, New York and grew up in Port Washington. He is also a graduate of Chaminade High School in Mineola. Reilly attended Cornell University, where he earned his undergraduate degree in communications arts in 1984. While at Cornell, Reilly was a member of the Phi Delta Theta fraternity.

== Career ==
=== 1984–2000: Early career, NBC and Brillstein-Grey ===
Reilly began his career as a freelance production assistant in New York City where he worked on over 150 commercials and music videos. To pursue a career in television, he took a road trip to Los Angeles, initially earning a position as a publicist with Universal Pictures and later hired by Brandon Tartikoff as a manager of creative affairs at NBC in 1988.

In his early years at NBC he developed Saved by the Bell. He later supervised Law & Order in its first season and developed the pilot episode for ER while serving as vice president of drama development from 1992 to 1994.

In 1994, Reilly left his role at NBC to become president of television at Brillstein-Grey Entertainment. While there, Reilly was responsible for shepherding some of television's top shows, such as NBC's Just Shoot Me and NewsRadio, and The WB's The Steve Harvey Show, and the pilot for HBO's The Sopranos. He resigned from the position in 2000.

=== 2000–2003: Move to FX ===
In 2000, Reilly joined FX as president of entertainment. While at FX, he helped the new network become a profitable, creative business. While there he also transitioned the network's programming from syndicated reruns to original programming including The Shield, Nip/Tuck, and Rescue Me. Within a year of his arrival, FX made cable history with its seminal series, The Shield broke cable ratings records when it premiered and received both a Golden Globe Award for Best Drama Series and an Emmy Award for lead actor Michael Chiklis in 2002. Reilly also championed Lucky, the first television project from the Cullen brothers.

=== 2003–2007: Second stint at NBC ===
In June 2003, Reilly was named the president of primetime development at NBC. In May 2004, he was promoted to president of the network's entire entertainment division, which included primetime, daytime, and late night programming. Reilly's second tenure at the network was marked by volatility largely due to the fact that major properties like The West Wing, Friends, Frasier, and Will & Grace came to a conclusion.

Despite NBC's poor performance, Reilly oversaw the development of some of the network's more prominent shows that helped to define the network in that decade. His vocal support of The Office helped it survive its low-rated first season. He also helped get My Name Is Earl on the air despite objections from other NBC Universal executives. Reilly has been credited with developing other shows such as Heroes, 30 Rock, Friday Night Lights, Deal or No Deal, America's Got Talent, and others.

Despite having received a new three-year contract at NBC in March 2007, Reilly's employment with NBC Universal was terminated in late May 2007, and he departed soon after. Under his administration, NBC's programs received 69 Emmy nominations that year, and a total of 235 nominations and 50 wins.

=== 2007–2014: Return to Fox ===
Six weeks after leaving NBC, Reilly was hired as president of entertainment at Fox. The move reunited him with Peter Liguori whom he also worked with while at FX. Early in his tenure at Fox, Reilly developed and launched the J. J. Abrams thriller Fringe, and Seth MacFarlane's Family Guy spinoff, The Cleveland Show. He also was involved in the launch of Fox Inkubation, a joint venture with 20th Century Fox that provided funding to animators to create two-minute shorts that could eventually be developed into television pilots. Through the program, Justin Roiland first generated the concept for what would become the Adult Swim show Rick and Morty.

In 2009, he launched Glee which would go on to win the Golden Globe Award for Best Television Series – Musical or Comedy in 2010. Reilly is generally credited with creating Jane Lynch's character, Sue Sylvester, on the show. In 2011, Reilly also championed New Girl, the network's highest-rated fall sitcom debut in 10 years, and the singing competition show, The X Factor.

Reilly was promoted to chairman of entertainment for Fox in August 2012. He later introduced the shows Brooklyn Nine-Nine, Bob's Burgers, and The Mindy Project.

At Fox, Reilly oversaw the network's leadership and investment in digital and social media. He is credited as "the architect" behind the Animation Domination High-Def, an independent digital animation subsidiary generating alternative animation for digital channels and a late-night block on Fox.

Reilly also initiated a "no pilot season" strategy (designed to nurture fewer new Fox shows with more investment). Prior to his departure, he also greenlit shows, including Empire, Gotham, and The Last Man on Earth. During his time at Fox from 2007 to 2014, the network had a seven-year run as television's top-rated network for adults aged 18 to 49. He left Fox in May 2014.

=== 2014–2020 ===
==== TBS, TNT, and Turner Entertainment ====
In November 2014, Reilly was named the president of TNT and TBS and chief creative officer of Turner Entertainment. In the role, he oversaw the TBS and TNT networks and led growth opportunities across Turner's entertainment properties including TBS, TNT, truTV, Adult Swim, Super Deluxe and ELEAGUE.

In 2016, Reilly led TNT to cut 50% of the ad load of the network's new dramas, starting with Animal Kingdom. Reilly has also gained notice for modernizing and reinventing the types of series seen on TNT and TBS, introducing dark original dramas at TNT, including Claws and The Alienist, and edgy comedies at TBS, including Full Frontal with Samantha Bee, The Detour, Wrecked, Angie Tribeca and The Last O.G.. He also led TBS to experiment with "binge-viewing" by airing all 10 episodes of Angie Tribeca’s first season repeatedly over 25-hours without commercials in January 2016 and again in November 2016 with the network’s newest original series, Search Party, which debuted all 10 episodes of first season during Thanksgiving weekend. Under Reilly's leadership, in 2017 TBS also introduced new unscripted shows including Snoop Dogg Presents the Joker's Wild and Drop the Mic.

At Turner, Reilly made investments in digital and social media content and pushed for multi-platform ratings measurement. In October 2015, Reilly oversaw the launch of Super Deluxe and pushed for investments in ELEAGUE, the first major foray into professional eSports video game competitions in prime-time TV by a traditional media company, and companies like Refinery29.

In 2018, Fast Company named Turner among "The World's Most Innovative Companies" in the video category citing Reilly's development of shows like Full Frontal with Samantha Bee and The Alienist with helping reinvent the company's TBS and TNT networks. In October 2019, Reilly worked with Tony Khan to bring AEW (All Elite Wrestling) to TNT in 2020. AEW signed a four-year contract extension in 2020 will begin airing a second weekly show on the network in 2021.

==== WarnerMedia ====
In December 2018, Reilly's role was expanded to include architecting the overall creative identity of WarnerMedia's direct-to-consumer streaming platform, being appointed president TBS and TNT and chief creative officer Turner and WarnerMedia Direct-to-Consumer. As CCO, Reilly oversaw licensing properties for the streaming service such as Friends, Big Bang Theory, DC theatrical films, and external properties including Sesame Street, Studio Ghibli, South Park, and a BBC output deal. Some of Reilly's programming at Max included Ridley Scott’s Raised by Wolves, Love Life starring Anna Kendrick, the ballroom competition show, Legendary and Justice League: “the Snyder Cut” as a re-conceived multi-part event.

In May 2019, Reilly signed a new, four-year deal with WarnerMedia that would have kept him at the company through 2022. It had expanded his oversight of the company's basic cable networks to include truTV in addition to TBS, TNT, and the direct-to-consumer streaming service (HBO Max). Reilly departed in August 2020 amidst a company-wide restructuring.

== Board memberships ==
Reilly has been chairman of the board of trustees and remains on the board for The Nature Conservancy of California. He is also a member of the Los Angeles Chapter of the Young Presidents' Organization and served 8 years on the board of trustees for the American Film Institute, the Television Academy, and on the advisory board for the Peabody Awards. Reilly also serves on the Advisory Council for Cornell's College of Agriculture and Life Sciences.

== Awards and recognition ==
In 2016, he was inducted into the Broadcasting & Cable Hall of Fame. In 2018, Reilly received the Brandon Tartikoff Legacy Award from the National Association of Television Program Executives (NATPE).

Business positions
Preceded by Jeff Zucker	President of NBC Entertainment; 2004–2007	Succeeded by Ben Silverman
Preceded by Peter Liguori	President of FOX Entertainment; 2007–2012	Succeeded by Peter Rice
Preceded by Peter Rice	Chairman of FOX Entertainment; 2012–2014	Succeeded by Peter Rice
Preceded by Steve Koonin	President of TBS and TNT; 2014–present	Succeeded by Incumbent
