= Brian Writes a Bestseller =

- Family Guy episode
- Episode no.: Season 9 Episode 7
- Directed by: Joseph Lee
- Written by: Gary Janetti
- Production code: 8ACX07
- Original air date: November 21, 2010

Guest appearances
- Dana Gould as himself (live-action); Arianna Huffington as herself (live-action); Christine Lakin as Joyce Kinney; Bill Maher as himself (live-action); Katie Sah as Jan; Ashley Tisdale as Kelly

Episode chronology
← Previous "Baby, You Knock Me Out"	Next → "Road to the North Pole"
- Family Guy season 9

"Brian Writes a Bestseller" is the sixth episode of the ninth season of the animated comedy series Family Guy. It premiered on Fox in the United States on November 21, 2010. "Brian Writes a Bestseller" follows anthropomorphic dog Brian after he publishes a self-help book that becomes an immediate success, following the failure of his novel, Faster Than the Speed of Love. Once he hires Stewie as his publicist, however, Brian becomes increasingly self-centered, and fires him when he continues to botch his schedule. However, when Brian goes on Real Time with Bill Maher, he ends up getting a wake-up call from Maher himself.

The episode was written by Gary Janetti and directed by Joseph Lee. It received high praise from critics for its storyline and many cultural references. According to Nielsen ratings, it was viewed in 6.59 million homes in its original airing. The episode featured guest performances by Dana Gould, Arianna Huffington, Christine Lakin, Bill Maher, Katie Sah and Ashley Tisdale, along with several recurring guest voice actors for the series. The episode was first announced at the 2010 San Diego Comic-Con.

== Plot ==
Receiving hundreds of packages in the mail containing unsold copies of his failed novel Faster Than the Speed of Love, Brian gives up his ambitions of becoming a writer. While reading The New York Times, Brian discovers that a self-help book is the highest-selling book on its bestseller list, and after some persuasion by Stewie, decides to write his own in order to prove that self-help books are useless. Finishing it in three hours and titling it Wish It, Want It, Do It, Brian publishes the book, and it immediately becomes a commercial success. Brian decides to hire Stewie (because of his connections that helped publish the book) as his publicist when the book becomes popular, and organizes a publicity tour. Though Brian is initially skeptical of Stewie's arrogant demeanour, Brian soon follows suit and becomes an egomaniac. While reflecting on his fame during dinner, Brian notices Renée Zellweger at the front of the restaurant; after angrily berating Stewie for not booking their table there, he punishes him by refusing to give him a lift to their hotel. Seeking to reconcile his relationship with Brian, Stewie books him an appearance on Real Time with Bill Maher to discuss separation of church and state with Maher and Christopher Hitchens.

Two hours prior to his appearance, after continuing to verbally abuse Stewie for minor inconveniences, Brian is then informed that Hitchens cannot attend, and that Arianna Huffington and Dana Gould will serve as replacement panelists. Blaming Stewie again, Brian angrily fires him and continues on to the show's panel. While on the show, Maher, Huffington and Gould begin to criticize Brian's book, stating that it fails to meet the expectations of the public and is pretentious, repetitive, unhelpful, banal and manipulative. Brian attempts to defend it by talking down to the panelists, including pettily insulting Huffington's accent while also referring to her as Zsa Zsa Gabor and Gould's feminine-sounding first name, but finds himself under pressure from them. In anger and desperation, he insults the panelists for having little sense in literature, but is constantly put down. He ultimately confesses that he too considers the book to be of a low standard, admitting that he wrote it in a day in the hope that it would sell. Maher loses all respect for Brian, stating that a real writer would stand by their work despite what others think. When trying to regain Maher's trust, Brian panics and urinates, prompting Maher to angrily chase him off the set with a newspaper. Humiliated, Brian returns to Quahog and half-heartedly apologizes to Stewie, during which he unsubtly and passive-aggressively continues to blame him for everything that went wrong. Realizing that this is going to be as good an "apology" as Brian can give, Stewie bluntly tells him "You can't write".

== Production and development ==
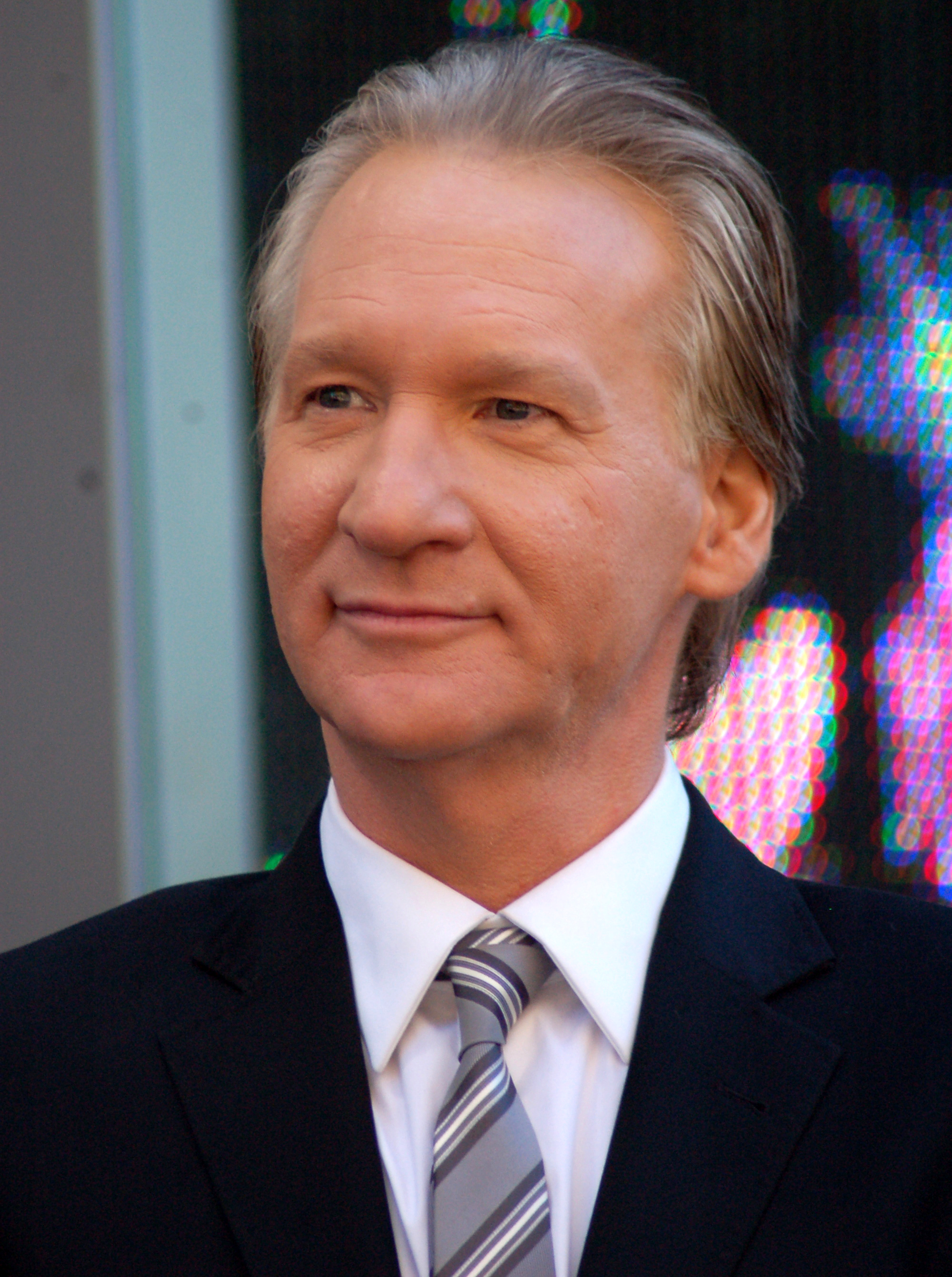
Political satirist Bill Maher made an appearance, and his talk show, Real Time with Bill Maher, was lampooned.

First announced at the 2010 San Diego Comic-Con by executive producer and series showrunner Steve Callaghan, the episode was written by series regular Gary Janetti, and directed by series regular Joseph Lee before the conclusion of the eighth production season. The episode featured a live-action sequence on the set of the HBO talk show Real Time with Bill Maher, with the animated Brian Griffin superimposed on the panel. Bill Maher appeared in the scene opposite panelists Dana Gould and Arianna Huffington.

In addition to the regular cast and that of Real Time with Bill Maher, actor Chris Cox, Christine Lakin, actress Katie Sah and actress Ashley Tisdale also appeared in the episode. Recurring voice actors Alexandra Breckenridge, actor Ralph Garman, writer Alec Sulkin and writer John Viener made minor appearances.

== Reception ==
"Brian Writes a Bestseller" was broadcast on November 21, 2010, as a part of an animated television night on Fox, and was preceded by The Simpsons, and Family Guy creator and executive producer Seth MacFarlane's spin-off, The Cleveland Show, and followed by an episode of American Dad!. It was watched by 6.59 million viewers, according to Nielsen ratings, despite airing simultaneously with the 38th Annual American Music Awards on ABC, Undercover Boss on CBS and Sunday Night Football on NBC. The episode also acquired a 3.3 rating in the 18–49 demographic, beating American Dad! and The Cleveland Show in addition to significantly edging out both shows in total viewership. The episode's ratings decreased significantly from the previous week's episode.

Emily VanDerWerff of The A.V. Club gave "Brian Writes a Bestseller" a positive review, writing that it had "just about everything you'd ask for from the show: a story that was just present enough to keep the jokes coming, featuring the show's two best characters [...] lots of gags at the expense of Brian's ego; and a satirical target that's not exactly fresh but at least leaves the show room to maneuver." However, she criticized the sequence with Brian on Real Time with Bill Maher, calling it "bafflingly poor". She rated the episode B. Jason Hughes of TV Squad praised the episode's satire of self-help books, saying: "Wrapping the message in humor is a clever way to maybe get people to think about it".
