= I Am Very Glad, As I Am Finally Returning Back Home =

"I Am Very Glad, Because I Am Finally Coming Home"

Song by Eduard Khil
- Released: 1966
- Recorded: 11 June 1965
- Genre: Vocalise
- Songwriter: Arkady Ostrovsky

"I Am Very Glad, Because I Am Finally Returning Back Home" (Russian: «Я очень рад, ведь я наконец возвращаюсь домой…»), also known as "Vocalise", and popularly known as the "Trololo song", is a Soviet vocalise composed in 1965 by Arkady Ostrovsky. The piece is largely associated with Russian baritone Eduard Khil and became internationally known in the late 2000s as an internet meme, popularly referred to as "Trololo".

== Background and composition ==
The work was originally conceived as a song with lyrics by poet Vadim Semernin, reportedly describing a lighthearted narrative set in the American West. According to later recollections by Khil and by Ostrovsky's family, the lyrics were considered unsuitable for publication at the time due to Soviet censorship. As a result, Ostrovsky reworked the piece as a wordless vocalise, retaining only the song’s title as a textual reference.

Ostrovsky's son, Mikhail Ostrovsky, later described the vocalise as partly arising from a creative dispute, during which the composer asserted that a song could succeed without lyrics. The melody was tailored to Khil's vocal range and stage persona and was performed with orchestral accompaniment under conductor Yuri Silantyev.

== Performances and recordings ==
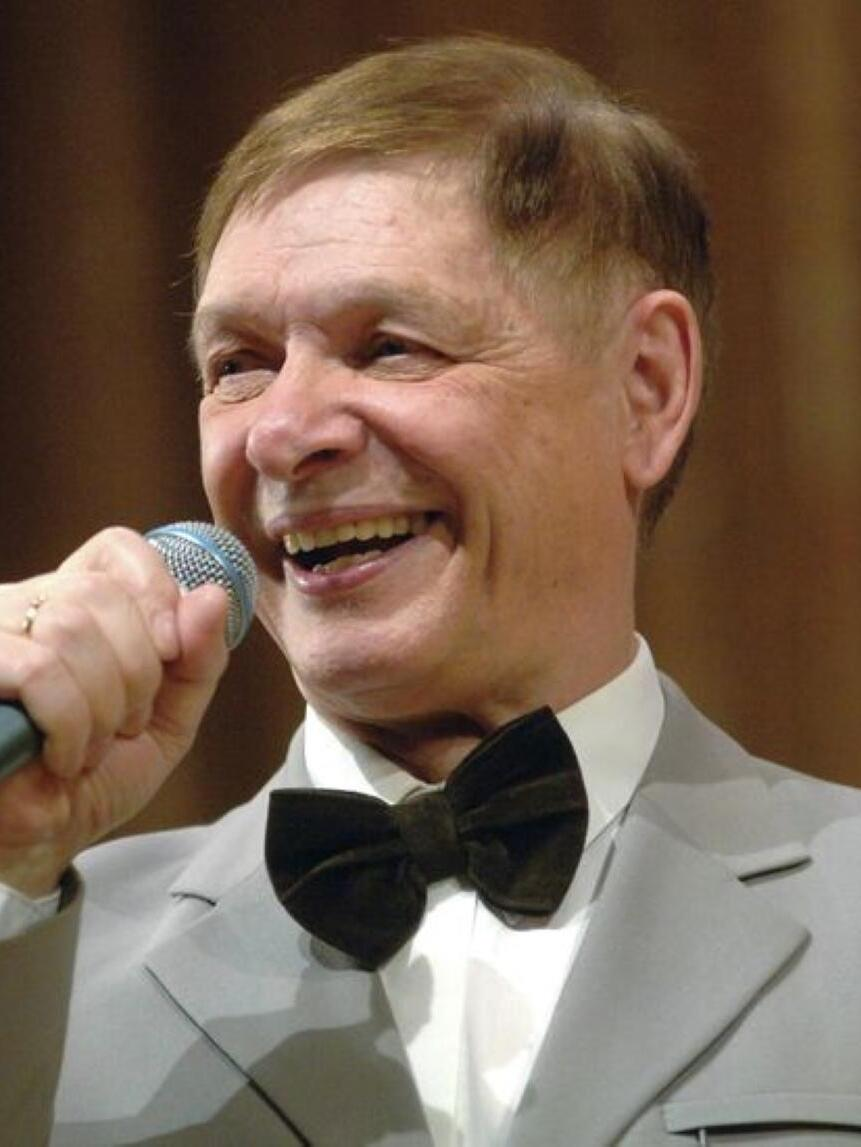
Eduard Khil performing in 2007

One of the first performers of the vocalise was Valery Obodzinsky, who recorded it in 1967 accompanied by a concert and pop orchestra conducted by Oleg Lundstrem. Eduard Khil also performed the vocalise during the same period, recording it on 11 June 1965. Muslim Magomayev additionally performed the vocalise in 1966 on the television program Little Blue Light. The most widely circulated version originates from a color television concert broadcast on 13 February 1976, titled Songs of Arkady Ostrovsky. Performed by Eduard Khil, recorded for Soviet Central Television.

== Internet rediscovery ==
In late 2009, footage from the 1976 television performance was uploaded to YouTube, where it quickly attracted international attention. By early 2010, the video had accumulated millions of views and became widely shared in English-language online communities.

The performance's distinctive style and non-lexical vocals led to Khil being dubbed "Mr. Trololo" in online culture. The song was frequently described in Western media as a Russian analogue to Rickrolling and became a recurring reference in discussions of early viral internet phenomena.

In 2017, Google celebrated what would have been Eduard Khil's 83rd birthday with an animated Google Doodle tribute that highlighted his performance of the song and its status as a viral internet meme.

== Use in film and television ==
The vocalise has been featured in a range of film and television productions:

- A recording performed by Valery Obodzinsky appears in the animated film I Met You and in the Russian drama Home (2011).
- The piece is heard in the second episode of the first season of the television series 12 Monkeys.
- In the Russian-language dub of Cell (2016), based on the novel by Stephen King, the vocalise plays through headphones worn by infected characters.
- In Pacific Rim: Uprising (2018), the song is briefly played by a Russian pilot en route to combat.
- The vocalise appears in the animated series Well, Just You Wait! Vacation (2021) and in the family film Cheburashka (2023).
- In the animated series Family Guy, the vocalise is performed by a Russian waiter who looks and sounds similar to Khil in the season 10 episode “Lottery Fever”.
- The piece is also heard repeatedly in the Russian television series Ivanovs-Ivanovs.
