= May There Always Be Sunshine =

Soviet children's song

"May There Always Be Sunshine" (Russian: "Пусть всегда будет солнце!", romanized: "Pust' vsegda budet solntse!" or Russian: "Солнечный круг", romanized: "Solnechyy krug") is a popular Soviet children's song created in 1962. The music was composed by Arkady Ostrovsky and the lyrics written by Lev Oshanin. Korney Chukovsky, a writer and immensely popular children's poet, later wrote that the inspiration for the song had been the four lines of the refrain, which were composed in 1928 by the four-year-old boy Kostya Barannikov.

The song was first performed in the Good Morning! (Russian: С добрым утром!, romanized: S dobrym utrom!) radio show in July 1962 by Maya Kristalinskaya. Performed in 1963 at the Sopot International Song Festival by Tamara Miansarova, the song earned her first prize there and immediately became popular throughout the USSR and in other countries too. It was frequently sung by Young Pioneers at their camps and school meetings, as well as by Little Octobrists in primary schools, and even by pre-school children. The song was widely regarded in the Soviet Union as expressing the people's desire for peace.

== Lyrics ==
The song expresses the yearning for lasting peace by millions of people, young and old. In war, the lyrics say, there are no winners. For our sake, and especially for our children's sake, we must achieve peace and remove the dark clouds that now cover the sun.

== International versions and adaptations ==
In 1964, the Swedish band, Hootenanny Singers, led by the future ABBA member Björn Ulvaeus recorded and released the song "Gabrielle" based on "May There Always Be Sunshine". The band enjoyed great success with this single in Scandinavia, and with this song, the band saw their first international exposure.

The song (or at least its chorus) has been sung in English by Pete Seeger, and is featured on the live album Together in Concert recorded in 1975 with Arlo Guthrie.

The song was translated into German by Ilse and Hans Naumilkat and Manfred Streubel (as "Immer lebe die Sonne") and was popular among Ernst Thälmann Pioneers.

The song was also very popular among Finnish Pioneers as "Paistaa aurinko aina".

It was also used by the Estonian Pioneers, the Estonian translation being "Olgu jääv meile päike" by Heljo Mänd. The most popular recording of it, is by the popular singer Georg Ots.

Hebrew lyrics were written for the song by composer Gidi Koren. It was recorded (Hebrew title: אלוהים שמור על אמא) and made popular by his Israeli folk group, The Brothers & the Sisters.

== In popular culture ==
Charlotte Diamond, the Canadian children's musician included the song in her 1985 album 10 Carrot Diamond. The chorus is sung in English, Russian, French, Spanish, German, and Cantonese with the instrumental accompaniment changing musical styles for each culture.

Raffi sang the original chorus and translations into English, Spanish and French on his album Let's Play. There is also an instrumental outro of the other song's title after this song.

This song was included in a medley during the opening ceremonies of the 2014 Olympic Winter Games in Sochi, Russia.

A bronze monument to Samantha Smith in Artek, Crimea, has an inscription on the pedestal: "May There Always Be Sunshine".

== See also ==
- List of anti-war songs
