= Non-lexical vocables in music =

Form of nonsense syllable used in a wide variety of music

Non-lexical vocables, also known as wordless vocals, are a form of nonsense syllable used in a wide variety of music. Common English examples are "la la la", "na na na" and "da da da", or the improvised nonsense sounds used in scat singing. Non-lexical vocables are found in a wide range of music from around the world and across many genres of music, and may be mixed with meaningful text in a given song or performance.

== Traditional music ==
Non-lexical vocables are used in yodeling, Blackfoot music and other Native American music, Pygmy music, the music of the Maldives. In Irish traditional music and Highland Scots music, it is called lilting, and in English traditional music it is called diddling. Vocables frequently act as formal markers, indicating the beginning and end of phrases, sections or songs themselves, and also as onomatopoeic references, cueing devices, and other purposes. Wordless vocals are also found Georgian polyphony, both in and outside of any yodelling parts (k'rimanch'uli) or refrains.

The Blackfoot, like other Plains Indians, use the consonants h, w, y, and vowels. They avoid c, n, (ts) and other consonants. e and i tend slightly to be higher pitches, a, o, and u lower ones.

The AIM Song has its origins in the Plains; as such, it holds similar characteristics to Blackfoot song. It is intended as an intertribal song, so the use of non-lexical vocables prevents bias to one particular language.

Other traditional musical forms employing non-lexical vocables include:

- Puirt à beul (traditional Scottish and Irish song form that sometimes employs nonsense syllables)
- Nigun in Jewish religious music
- Joik or luohti (improvised Sami chant employing nonsense syllables and few or no lyrics)
- Ululation

== Jazz music ==
Scat singing is a type of vocal instrumental music. A scat is vocalized using wordless vocables and syllables (e.g. "bippity-bippity-doo-wop-razzamatazz-skoobie-doobie-shoobity-bee-bop-a-lula-shabazz") as employed by jazz singers. Scat singing gives singers the ability to sing improvised melodies and rhythms, to create the equivalent of an instrumental solo using their voice. Scatman John (John Paul Larkin) renewed interest in the genre briefly during the mid-1990s.

Vocal improviser Bobby McFerrin’s performances at major concert halls worldwide show that “wordless singing has traveled far from the concepts demonstrated by Louis Armstrong, Gladys Bentley, Cab Calloway, Anita O’Day, and Leo Watson”.

Another method of scat singing is practiced by guitarists who scat along with their guitar solos note for note. Notable practitioners include Theo Katzman, George Benson, Sheldon Reynolds, and Rik Emmett.

== Orchestral accompaniment ==
A non-lexical form of Latin is often used as accompaniment for orchestral movie and video game soundtracks. It utilizes strings of Dog Latin syllables and a deep tone to emulate ominous or grandiose Latin chants.

== Vocal percussion ==
Non-lexical vocables that take on percussive roles:

- Tabla Bols
- Beatboxing
- Konnakol

== Musical training ==
- Solfège, or solfa, is a technique for teaching sight-singing, in which each note is sung to a special syllable (do, re, mi, fa, sol, la, ti).
- Canntaireachd is an ancient Scottish practice of noting music with a combination of definite syllables for ease of recollection and transmission.
- In India, the origin of solmization was to be found in Vedic texts like the Upanishads, which discuss a musical system of seven notes, realized ultimately in what is known as sargam. In Indian classical music, the notes in order are: sa, re, ga, ma, pa, dha, and ni.
- Byzantine music also uses syllables derived from a hymn to name notes: starting with A, the notes are pa, vu, ga, di, ke, zo, ni.
- In Japan, the Iroha, an ancient poem, is sometimes used as solfège (i, chi, yo, ra, ya, a, we).

== Popular music of the WWII era ==
The song "Swinging the Alphabet" is sung by The Three Stooges in their short film Violent Is the Word for Curly (1938). It is the only full-length song performed by the Stooges in their short films, and the only time they mimed to their own pre-recorded soundtrack. The lyrics use each letter of the alphabet to make a nonsense verse of the song:

B-A-bay, B-E-bee, B-I-bicky-bi, B-O bo, bicky-bi bo, B-U bu, bicky bi bo bu.
C-A-cay, C-E-cee, C-I-cicky-ci, C-O co, cicky-ci co, C-U cu, cicky ci co cu.
D-A-day, D-E-dee, D-I-dicky-di, D-O do, dicky-di do, D-U du, dicky di do du.
F-A-fay, F-E-fee, F-I-ficky-fi, F-O fo, Ficky-fi fo, F-U fu, ficky fi fo fu.
...

The song "Mairzy Doats" (1943) used blurred lyrics that sound non-lexical:

Mairzy doats and dozy doats and liddle lamzy divey
A kiddley divey too, wouldn't you?

The lyrics of the bridge provide a clue:

If the words sound queer and funny to your ear, a little bit jumbled and jivey,
Sing "Mares eat oats and does eat oats and little lambs eat ivy."
"A kid'll eat ivy too, wouldn't you?"

== Popular music ==
Styles of popular music that frequently employ non-lexical vocables include:

- A cappella (singing without instrumental accompaniment, sometimes accompanied by a chorus of nonsense syllables)
- Doo-wop (style of rhythm and blues music that often employs nonsense syllables)

Scat singing influenced the development of doo-wop and hip hop. It was popular enough in doo-wop that Barry Mann and Gerry Goffin made it the subject of a 1961 song, Who Put the Bomp (in the Bomp, Bomp, Bomp)". Neil Sedaka and Howard Greenfield, who worked with Mann and Goffin at the Brill Building at the same time, added non-lexical vocables at the start of their song "Breaking Up Is Hard to Do" when they could not come up with a good lyric for the opening line; Sedaka's first recording of the song was such a success that they made it a trademark for their next several songs, including "Next Door to an Angel" and "Happy Birthday Sweet Sixteen". (Sedaka and Greenfield had become so attached to the idea that when Sedaka dissolved his partnership with Greenfield in the early 1970s, he labeled his final album with him The Tra-La Days Are Over.) It has also appeared in various genres of rock music. Jim Morrison of The Doors sings a chorus of slow scat on the song "Cars Hiss By My Window", trying to replicate a harmonica solo he had heard, as well as on the song "Roadhouse Blues"; scat singing also notably opens the B-side of Joe Walsh's 1973 album The Smoker You Drink, The Player You Get with the song "Meadow". The technique was employed in the song "The Great Gig in the Sky" by Pink Floyd, as well as the R&B song "Rubber Biscuit" by The Chips (also as by The Blues Brothers). The list of scat singers includes such greats as Jelly Roll Morton, Louis Armstrong, Bing Crosby, Cab Calloway, Scatman Crothers, Dizzy Gillespie, Ella Fitzgerald, Sarah Vaughan, Sammy Davis Jr., Mel Tormé, Tony Bennett, Cleo Laine, Roger Miller, Aretha Franklin, Van Morrison, and the Pointer Sisters.

Scatting also makes appearances in newer genres, including industrial music, in the chorus of Ministry's 1991 song "Jesus Built My Hotrod"; nu metal music, particularly in the band Korn (whose lead singer Jonathan Davis has incorporated scat singing into songs such as "Twist", "Ball Tongue", "Freak on a Leash", "B.B.K.", "Beat it Upright", "Liar", and "Rotting in Vain"); and the heavy metal subgenre of death metal, where scat singing is used by John Tardy of the band Obituary. Jack Black incorporates scat into several Tenacious D songs, most notably: "Tribute", "Cosmic Shame", "Classico", "Jesus Ranch", Low Hangin' Fruit", and "Bowie". Singer JoJo performs ad-libbed scats on the track "Yes or No". Other modern examples include "Under Pressure" by Queen, "Rag Doll" by Aerosmith, "Under My Voodoo" by Sublime, "No! Don't Shoot" by Foxy Shazam, "Ma Meeshka Mow Skwoz" by Mr. Bungle, "In My Bed" by Amy Winehouse, and "Stuck in the Middle" by Mika. Scatman John combined scat and early-1990s electronic dance music.

Folderol, a nonsense refrain in songs, is used in genres as diverse as Christmas songs ("Deck the Halls") and naval songs like "Don't Forget Your Old Shipmate".

The European pop genre yé-yé was named after the frequent use of English-derived "Yeah!" as filler. Spanish yeyé signer Massiel won the 1968 Eurovision Song Contest with La, la, la.

Due to the wide-ranging vocal styles used in popular music, occasionally songs have been mistakenly categorized as having non-lexical vocables, when in fact the singers are performing actual lyrics rendered partially (or completely) unintelligible to the ear of some (but not all) listeners. Two famous 1960s examples are "Louie Louie" as recorded by The Kingsmen and "Wooly Bully" by Sam the Sham and the Pharaohs.

== Examples ==
Some bands have invented a language for their lyrics; examples include Kobaïan, used by French progressive rock band Magma, and Vonlenska, also called Hopelandic, employed by the Icelandic post-rock band Sigur Rós.

Adriano Celentano's 1972 song "Prisencolinensinainciusol" is sung in gibberish that is meant to sound like American English.

Jack Black uses non-lexical vocables whilst singing as Tenacious D.

"Da Da Da" by German group Trio uses the phrase "da da da" throughout the song.

The chorus to the Simon and Garfunkel hit "The Boxer" contains the repeated phrase "lie-la-lie".

One of the most famous examples comes from The Beatles' song "Hey Jude", which ends with a long run of "Na na na na na na na". Similarly Elton John's "Crocodile Rock" employs "la, la la la la la" for much of the chorus.

Other notable songs to include non-lexical vocables include The Police's song "De Do Do Do, De Da Da Da", The Delfonics song "La-La (Means I Love You)", and Dave Dee, Dozy, Beaky, Mick & Tich's song "Zabadak!".

Van Morrison employed scat in his performances.

The Dandy Warhols used non-lexical vocables throughout the song "The Dandy Warhols' T.V. Theme Song", which was on their 1995 album Dandys Rule OK.

Hanson used non-lexical vocables in the chorus of their 1997 song "MMMBop".

Alcest used an invented language made up of spontaneous and improvised sounds on a fourth of their songs.

French singer Antoine Tomé has used vocal percussions and sung several of his songs in an imaginary language since the 1970's.

Examples by popular non-anglophone singers using such techniques include "Bla Bla Bla" by Gigi D'Agostino, "Eena Mina Dika" in the Bollywood film Aasha, Eduard Khil's "I Am Very Glad, As I Am Finally Returning Back Home" (known as "Trololo") sung entirely without lyrics, "Fuzao" by Faye Wong, "Lagu Lagu" by Sa Dingding, "Din Daa Daa" by George Kranz, and much (but not all) of the lyrics to Finnish folk song and meme phenomenon "Ievan Polkka".

Russian ska punk band Nogu Svelo! tends to use various non-lexical vocables in their songs. Their popular song "Haru Mamburu" (Russian: Хару Мамбуру) is composed completely from pseudoword vocables without any meaningful text.

Pseudo-Latin is sometimes used in new-age music, especially when it imitates Gregorian chant or other choral church music, e.g. "Ameno" by Era or "Adiemus" by Adiemus.

Franco Godi, in songs like Parapapa Perepepe, on his "Signor Rossi" album, perhaps an Italian sounding variation of the name of the Icelandic band Sigur Rós.

== Disney songs ==
A signature of some Disney musical films is their songs' use of nonsense words, the longest and most famous of which is from Mary Poppins, entitled "Supercalifragilisticexpialidocious". A close second is "Zip-a-Dee-Doo-Dah" from Song of the South, which won the Academy Award for Best Original Song. Nonsense word song titles include:

- "Heigh-Ho" from Snow White and the Seven Dwarfs (1937)
- "Zip-a-Dee-Doo-Dah" from Song of the South (1946)
- "Bibbidi-Bobbidi-Boo" from Cinderella (1950)
- "Supercalifragilisticexpialidocious" and "Chim Chim Cher-ee" from Mary Poppins (1964)
- "Substitutiary Locomotion" from Bedknobs and Broomsticks (1971), which includes the incantation "Treguna Mekoides and Tracorum Satis Dee"
- "Whistle-Stop" from Robin Hood (1973), which was reused in "The Hampsterdance Song" (2000)
- "Whoop-de-Dooper Bounce" from The Tigger Movie (2000)

Nonsense lyrics also feature in the following Disney songs:

- "I Wanna Be Like You" from The Jungle Book features a segment of improvisational nonsense words.
- "Trashing the Camp" from Tarzan also contains a segment of improvisational nonsense words.
- "Everybody Wants to Be a Cat" from The Aristocats, sung by Scatman Crothers as "Scat Cat", contains lengthy scat sequences.

== See also ==
- Idioglossia
- Kakegoe
- Lilting
- Nigun
- Mondegreen
- Nonsense song – Type of song
