= List of scat singers =

This article lists notable scat singers by year of birth. It is also sortable alphabetically.

Artist	Lifespan
Jelly Roll Morton	1890–1941
Cliff Edwards	1895–1971
Leo Watson	1898–1950
Louis Armstrong	1901–1971
Adelaide Hall	1901–1993
Cab Calloway	1907–1995
Nat Gonella	1908–1998
Louis Prima	1910–1978
Scatman Crothers	1910–1986
Johnnie Davis	1910–1983
Slim Gaillard	1916–1991
Dizzy Gillespie	1917–1993
Ella Fitzgerald	1917–1996
Eddie Jefferson	1918–1979
Anita O'Day	1919–2006
Clark Terry	1920–2015
Carmen McRae	1920–1994
Jon Hendricks	1921–2017
Sarah Vaughan	1924–1990
Alice Babs	1924–2014
Sammy Davis, Jr.	1925–1990
Mel Tormé	1925–1999
Tony Bennett	1926–2023
Cleo Laine	1927–2025
Chet Baker	1929–1988
Betty Carter	1929–1998
Shooby Taylor	1929–2003
Richard B. Boone	1930–1999
Mark Murphy	1932–2015
Eduard Khil	1934–2012
Johnny "Guitar" Watson	1935–1996
Roger Miller	1936–1992
Billy Stewart	1937–1970
Jeanne Lee	1939–2000
Neil Sedaka	1939–2026
Al Jarreau	1940–2017
Gene Greene	1881–1930
Harry Nilsson	1941–1994
Aretha Franklin	1942–2018
John Paul Larkin ("Scatman John")	1942–1999
Flora Purim	1942–
George Benson	1943–
Urszula Dudziak	1943–
Micky Dolenz	1945–
Van Morrison	1945–
Robert Wyatt	1945–
Carl Anderson	1945–2004
Ruth Pointer (Pointer Sisters)	1946–
David Gilmour	1946–
Freddie Mercury	1946–1991
Edgar Winter	1946–
Aura Urziceanu	1946–
Anita Pointer (Pointer Sisters)	1948–2022
Patsy Gallant	1948–
Ray Brown, Jr.	1949–
Leon Redbone	1949–2019
Dan Hartman	1950–1994
Bobby McFerrin	1950–
Bonnie Pointer (Pointer Sisters)	1950–2020
Dee Dee Bridgewater	1950–
Carla White	1951–2007
June Pointer (Pointer Sisters)	1953–2006
Chaka Khan	1953–
Jackie Chan	1954–
David Lee Roth	1954–
Ondina Veloso (Dina)	1956–2019
Maria João Monteiro Grancha	1956–
Michael Jackson	1958–2009
Pedro Aznar	1959–
Ken Ard	1960–
John Pizzarelli	1960–
Anthony Kiedis	1962–
Karrin Allyson	1963–
Holly Cole	1963–
Kurt Elling	1967–
Dave Matthews	1967–
Mike Patton	1968–
Janusz Szrom	1968–
Jack Black	1969–
Aziza Mustafa Zadeh	1969–
Jonathan Davis	1971–
Loire (musician)	1972–
Reggie Watts	1972–
Ledisi	1972–
Jón Þór Birgisson	1975–
Jane Monheit	1977–
Jason Mraz	1977–
Marc Roberge	1978–
Rai Thistlethwayte	1980–
Sara Leib	1981–
Harry James Angus	1982–
Amy Winehouse	1983–2011
Theo Katzman	1986–
Veronica Swift	1994–
Nikki Yanofsky	1994–
Crazy Frog	1997–
Caity Gyorgy	1998–

== Groups ==
Group	Years active
The Boswell Sisters	1925–1936
The Andrews Sisters	1925–1967
The Nutty Squirrels	1959–1964, 1977–1981
The Swingle Singers	since 1962
The Manhattan Transfer	1969–1971; since 1972

== See also ==
- List of jazz musicians
