= Hootenanny Singers =

Swedish folk group

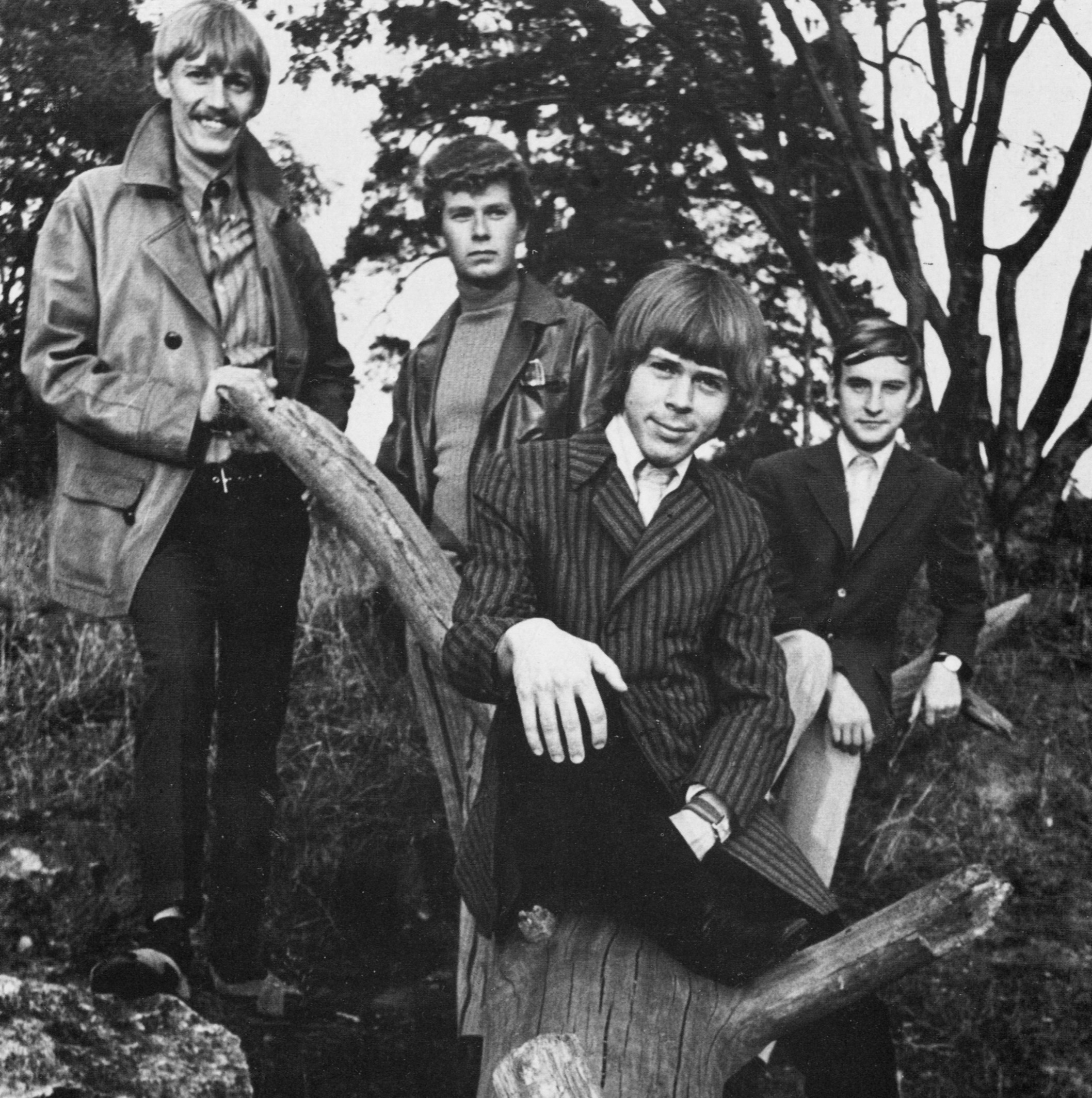
- From left to right: Hansi Schwarz, Johan Karlberg, Björn Ulvaeus and Tonny Rooth.

Background information
- Also known as: Westbay Singers, The Northern Lights, The Hooten Singers
- Origin: Västervik, Sweden
- Genres: Folk; pop
- Years active: 1961–1974; 1979-present
- Labels: Polar; Fontana
- Members: Martin Arnoldi; Eoin Clancy; Tonny Roth
- Past members: Björn Ulvaeus; Hansi Schwarz; Johan Karlberg

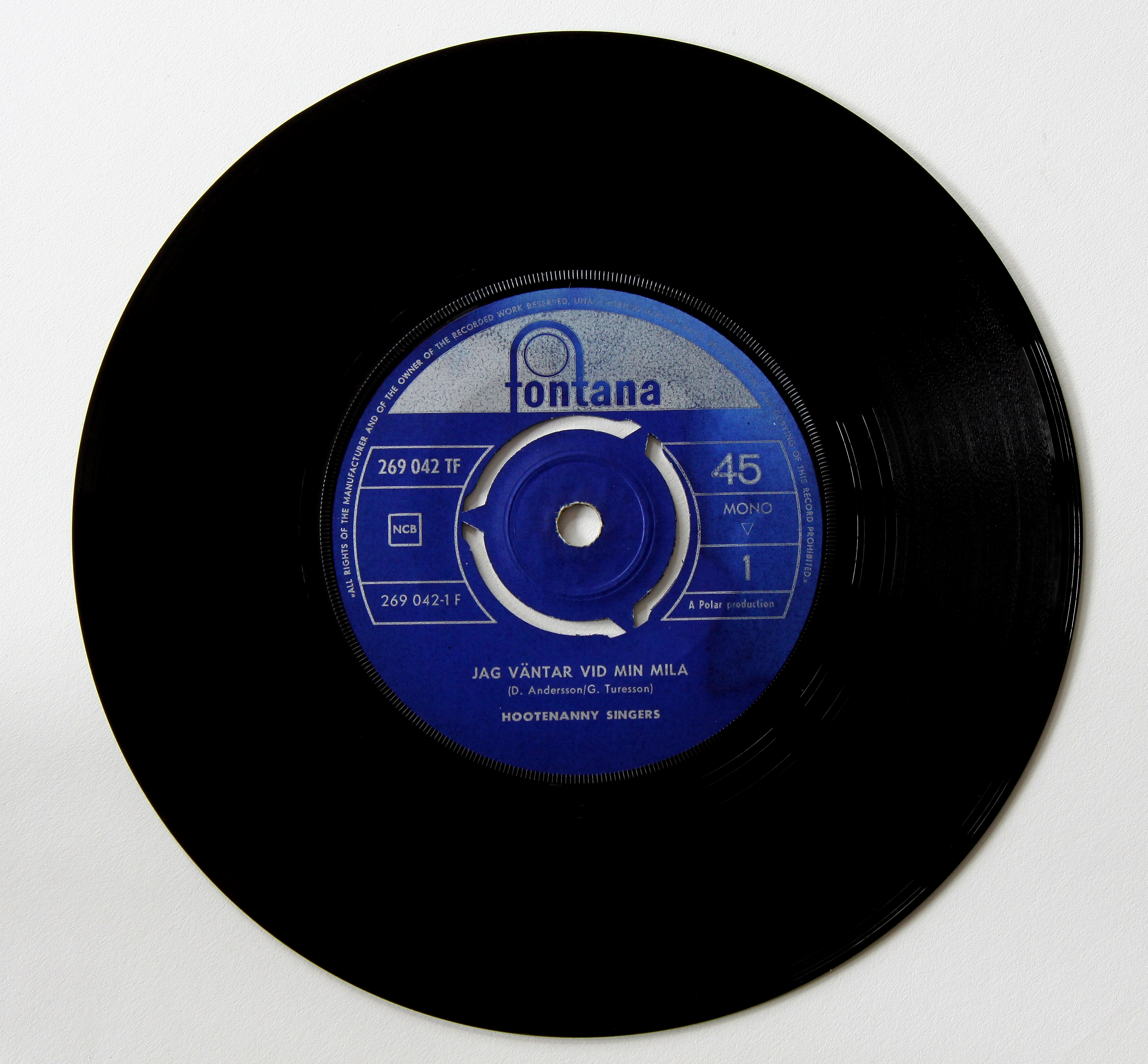
45-RPM single of Jag väntar vid min mila purchased in Denmark around 1964–1965. Built-in center adapter is still attached.

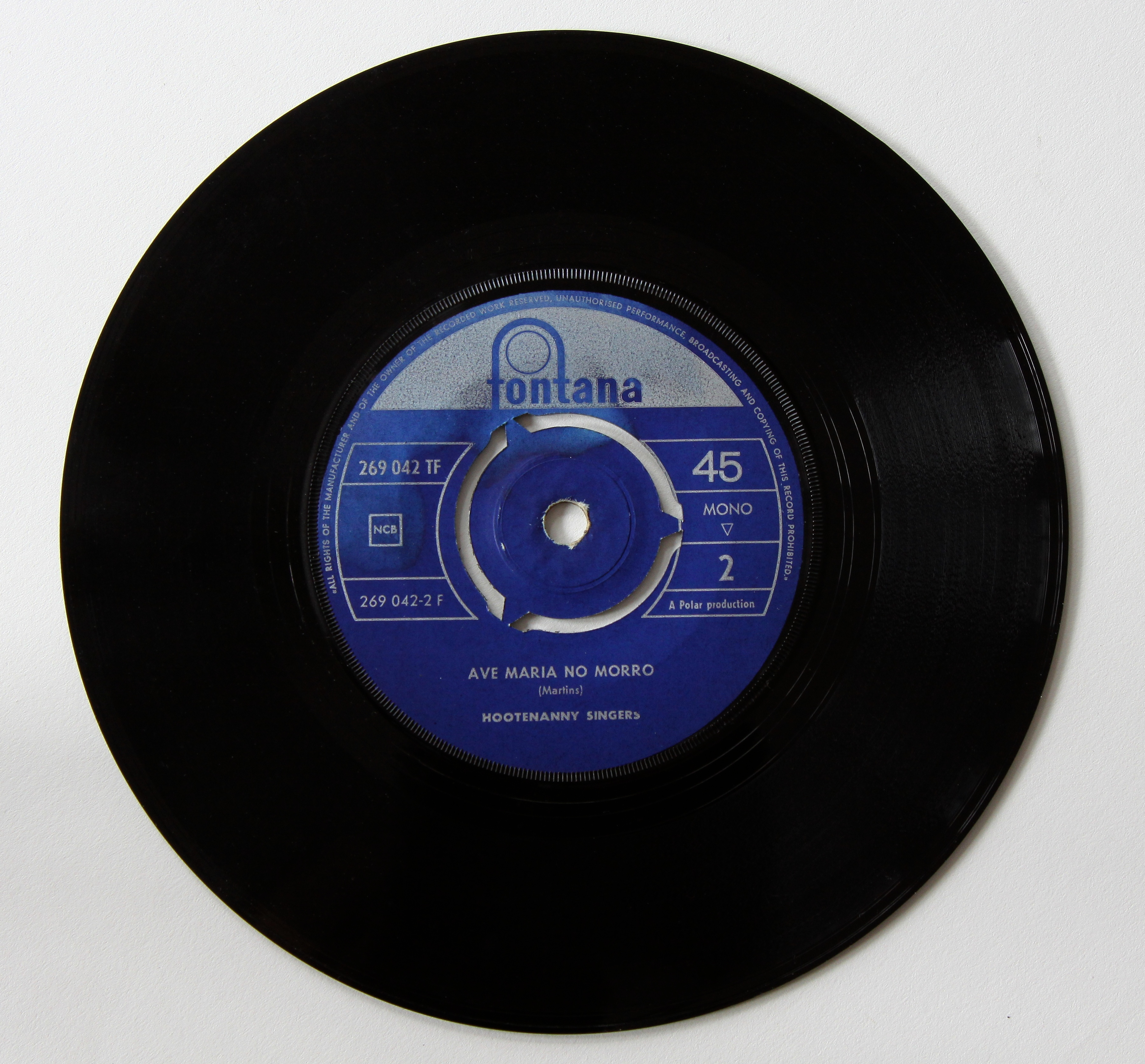
B side of 45-RPM record with "Ave Maria No Morro"

The Hootenanny Singers are a popular folk group from Västervik, Sweden, founded in 1961. The group included Björn Ulvaeus, who later became a member of ABBA. Other band members were Johan Karlberg (b. Karl Johan Hilding Karlberg, 14 April 1943, Vimmerby, Sweden d. 16 August 1992, Västervik, Sweden), Tonny Rooth (b. Sven Villy Tonny Rooth, 30 November 1943, Västervik, Sweden) and Hansi Schwarz (b. Hans Carl Schwarz, 16 March 1942, Munich, Germany d. 10 January 2013, Lund, Sweden). The group was named "The Northern Lights" for a US-released LP in 1966.

== Early debut ==
In 1964, they gave their first performance on the Swedish TV programme Hylands Hörna with locally well-known Swedish poet Dan Andersson's "Jag väntar vid min mila" (translated as "I'm Waiting at the Charcoal Kiln").

The band had an early hit in the song Gabrielle, based on the Russian song "May There Always Be Sunshine" by Arkady Ostrovsky. A lack of international copyright agreements meant that songs from the Soviet Union were then considered to be in the public domain. Stig Anderson and Bengt Bernhag, co-founders of the band's production company Polar Music, claimed credits for the song's arrangement and Swedish lyrics. Russian media sources would later describe this as plagiarism or theft. After reaching number five on the Swedish charts, the band translated and recorded versions of Gabrielle in German, Finnish, Italian, Dutch, and English.

== Later career and end of the group ==
Their extensive touring of Swedish outdoor concert venues brought them fame and they had numerous hit singles on the Svensktoppen chart. Their biggest hit was "Omkring tiggarn från Luossa", which broke the record by spending 52 weeks on Svensktoppen between 26 November 1972 and 18 November 1973. Johan Karlberg dropped out of the band in the late 1960s to take over his father's business. Karlberg died in 1992. Hansi Schwarz was also the leader of the Västervik folk ballad festival for many years. Schwarz died in 2013. Tonny Rooth and Björn Ulvaeus are the two surviving members of the band's original line-up. Some of the tracks on the 1969 album På tre man hand were released as solo singles by Björn Ulvaeus.

== Discography ==
=== Albums ===
Year	Title
1964	Hootenanny Singers
1964	Hootenanny Singers
1965	Hootenanny Singers sjunger Evert Taube
1965	International
1966	Många ansikten/Many Faces
1967	Civila
1968	5 år
1968	Bellman på vårt sätt
1969	På Tre Man Hand
1970	Skillingtryck
1971	Våra Vackraste Visor
1972	Våra Vackraste Visor Vol. 2
1973	Dan Andersson på vårt sätt
1974	Evert Taube på vårt sätt
1979	Nya vindar
1982	För kärleks skull

=== Compilations ===
Year	Title
1967	Gabrielle (The Northern Lights)
1967	Hootenanny Singers bästa
1968	De bästa med Hootenanny Singers & Björn Ulvaeus
1970	Hootenanny Singers
1970	Hootenanny Singers
1974	Favoriter
1985	Bästa
1989	De 24 bästa
1989	Spotlight
1991	Bästa
1995	Svenska favoriter
2002	Musik vi minns...

=== EPs ===
Year	Title
1964	Jag väntar vid min mila
1964	En mor
1964	Lincolnvisan (With Lars Frosterud (Frosse))
1964	Hey Liley Hey Lo
1965	Hootenanny Singers
1965	Frogg
1965	Hootenanny Singers sjunger Evert Taube
1965	Björkens visa
1966	Marianne
1966	No time
1967	En sång en gång för längesen
1967	Början till slutet

=== Singles ===
Year	Title	
Year	Title	1964
"Jag väntar vid min mila"		1964
"Darlin"		1964
"This Little Light of Mine"		1964
"Gabrielle"		1964
"La Mamma"		1964
"Ann-Margret"		1964
"Katjusha"
1965	"Den gyllene fregatt"	
1965	"Britta"	
1965	"Solola"	
1965	"Den sköna Helen"	
1965	"Wenn Alle Ströme Versiegen"	
1965	"All My Trials"	
1965	"Just the Way That You Are"	
1966	"No Time"	
1966	"Marianne"	
1966	"Through Darkness Light"	
1967	" Det är skönt att vra hemma igen"	
1967	"En sång en gång för längesen"	
1967	"Blomman"	
1967	"En gång är ingen gång"	
1967	"Mrs O'Grady"	
1967	"Början till slutet"	
1968	"Den dagen den sorgen"	
1968	"Så länge du älskar är du ung"	
1968	"Mårten gås"	
1968	"Måltidssång"	
1968	"Elenore"	
1969	"Om jag kunde skriva en visa"	
1969	"Vinden sjunger samma sång"	
1970	"Ring Ring, här är Svensktoppsjuryn"	
	"I fjol så gick jag med herrarna i hagen"	
1971	"Aldrig mer"	
1971	"Hjärtats saga"	
1972	"Ida och Frida och Anne-Marie"	
1973	"Sjösalavals"	
1974	"Linnéa"	

== See also ==
- Hootenanny
