= Eduard Khil =

Russian singer (1934–2012)

Eduard Khil OZOIV
- Эдуард Хиль
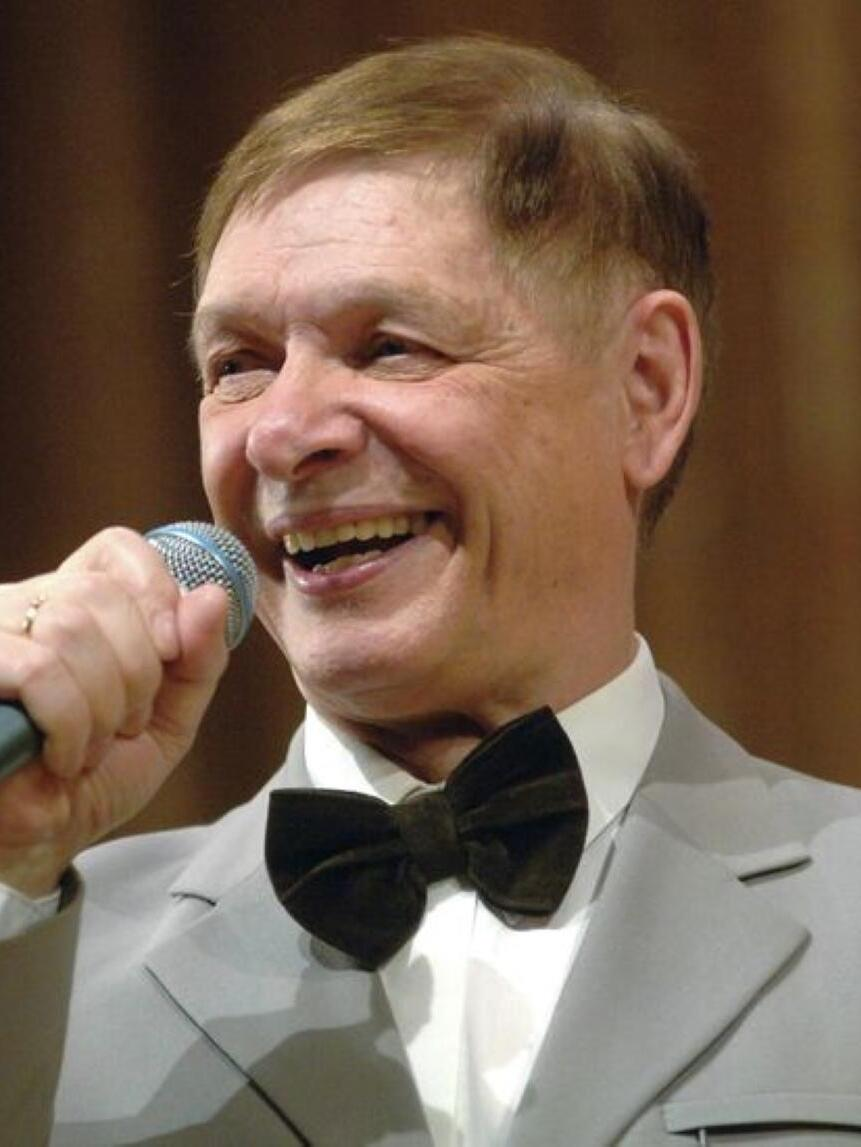
- Khil in 2007
- Born: Eduard Anatolyevich Khil; 4 September 1934; Smolensk, Western Oblast, Russian SFSR, Soviet Union
- Died: 4 June 2012 (aged 77); Saint Petersburg, Russia
- Resting place: Smolensky Cemetery
- Occupation: Singer
- Years active: 1955–2012
- Spouse: Zoya Pravdina (m. 1958)
- Children: 1
- Awards: Order "For Merit to the Fatherland"; Order of the Red Banner of Labour; Order of Friendship of Peoples; People’s Artist of the RSFSR; Lenin Komsomol Prize

Eduard Anatolyevich Khil (Russian: Эдуард Анатольевич Хиль, Russian pronunciation: [ɨdʊˈart ɐnɐˈtolʲjɪvʲɪtɕ ˈxʲilʲ]; 4 September 1934 – 4 June 2012), often anglicized as Edward Hill, was a Russian baritone singer.

Khil became known to international audiences in 2010, when a 1976 clip of him singing a non-lexical vocable version of the song "I Am Very Glad, As I Am Finally Returning Back Home" (Russian: "Я очень рад, ведь я, наконец, возвращаюсь домой", romanized: "Ya ochen' rad, ved' ya, nakonets, vozvrashchayus' domoy") became an Internet meme, often referred to as "Trololol" or "Trololo", or as the "Russian Rickroll", and the song became associated with Internet trolling. The song's newfound prominence in Internet culture led him to adopt Mr. Trololo as a stage name.

== Early life and education ==
Eduard Anatolyevich Khil was born on 4 September 1934, in Smolensk, to Anatoly Vasilyevich Khil and Yelena Pavlovna Kalugina. With his family breaking up, he was raised by his mother. During World War II, his kindergarten was bombed and he was separated from his mother and evacuated to Bekovo, Penza Oblast, where he ended up in a children's home, which lacked basic facilities and needs, including food. Despite the desperate situation, Eduard regularly performed in front of wounded soldiers in the nearby hospital. He was reunited with his mother in 1943 when Smolensk was liberated from Nazi Germany and in 1949 moved to Leningrad, where he enrolled in and then graduated from printing college. In 1955, Khil enrolled in the Leningrad Conservatory, where he studied under direction of Yevgeny Olkhovsky and Zoya Lodyi. He graduated in 1960. During his studies, he began performing various lead operatic roles, including Figaro in The Marriage of Figaro.

== Career ==
After graduating he became interested in pop music after attending a Klavdiya Shulzhenko concert, and started to perform popular music. This led to him winning several prizes in the next two decades. He won the "All Russian Competition for Performers" in 1962 and was invited to perform at the "Festival of Soviet Songs" in 1965. He attained second place in Sopot International Song Festival in 1965. In 1967, composer Andrei Petrov won the USSR State Prize for a collection of songs performed mainly by Khil, and in 1968 Khil was awarded the Honored Artist of the RSFSR. The Order of the Red Banner of Labour was awarded in 1971, and Russia's most prestigious artist award, the People's Artist of the RSFSR, was awarded to Khil in 1974. He was so successful that the public called him the 'Symbol of Leningrad'.

Between 1977 and 1979, Khil taught solo singing at the Russian State Institute of Performing Arts.

Khil toured in over 80 countries and lived at Tolstoy House (Russian: Толсто́вский дом) in Saint Petersburg.

After his singing career faded in the early 1990s, Khil re-entered private life and worked in a café in Paris, singing cabaret. In 1996, upon the suggestion of his son Dmitry, he became part of Khil and the Sons, a joint project with the rock band Prepinaki.

For his 75th birthday, Khil was awarded the Order "For Merit to the Fatherland", 4th class in 2009 by Russia and, in 2010, performed in Saint Petersburg's Victory Day Parade.

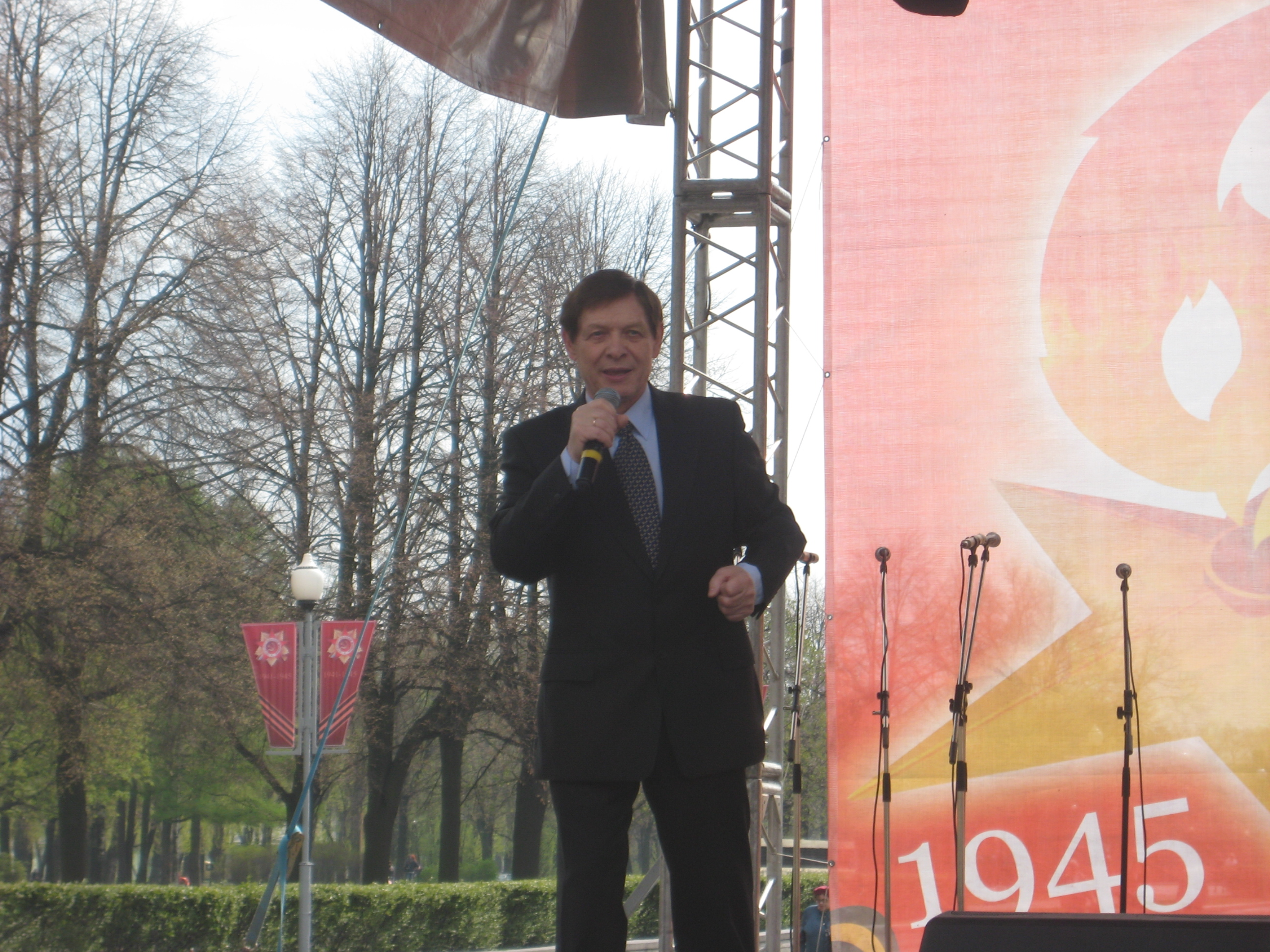
Khil performing at the 65th anniversary Victory Day Parade (Saint Petersburg) in 2010

=== Song style ===
He was the first artist to sing such songs as Woodcutters (Russian: Лесору́бы), I am so happy to be finally back at home, Moonstone (Russian: Лунный камень) by Arkady Ostrovsky, A song about a friend (Russian: Пе́сня о дру́ге), And people go to the sea (Russian: А лю́ди ухо́дят в мо́ре) by Andrei Petrov and Blue Cities (Russian: Голубы́е города́). Other popular songs performed by Khil included From where does the homeland begin? (Russian: С чего́ начина́ется Ро́дина?), How the steamers are seen off (Russian: Как провожа́ют парохо́ды), Winter (Russian: Зима́), Birch sap (Russian: Берёзовый сок), Alder Catkin (Russian: Серёжка ольхо́вая), We need one victory (Russian: Нам нужна́ одна́ побе́да), and many others.

Khil's manner of singing and performance was unique and easily recognizable in Russia (as well as in other countries that were part of the USSR), characterized by his personal charm and his lyrical baritone, which combined a degree of optimism and humor.

== Personal life ==
The family name Khil is thought to have come from a Spanish ancestor with the surname Gil, which is pronounced similarly to hill.

In July 1958, Khil met ballerina Zoya Pravdina, while performing alongside her at the Leningrad Conservatory. During the summer and fall, they toured together, and began a romantic relationship. They were married on 1 December 1958, and stayed married until his death in 2012. Pravdina died on 27 January 2024, at the age of 92.

The couple had one son, Dmitri, born 2 June 1963, and a grandson named Eduard (born in 1997) after his grandfather.

== Illness and death ==
On 8 April 2012, Khil suffered a stroke and was hospitalized with serious brain injuries at the Mariinsky Hospital in Saint Petersburg, where he fell into a coma immediately afterward. Doctors were initially optimistic about a partial recovery, but later retracted those statements. His condition was later reported as critical, with now irreversible brain damage. He died in the hospital in Saint Petersburg on 4 June 2012, from complications from the stroke, aged 77.

Among people who offered their condolences to Khil's family was Russia's President Vladimir Putin. He said about Eduard Khil:

His name is connected to an era in the history of Russian music. Eduard Khil was unique in his extraordinary charm and lyricism, and constant in his professionalism, vocal culture and creative taste. Many of the songs he performed became part of the golden fund of the Russian stage.

== Legacy ==
=== Internet videos ===
In 2009, a 1976 video of Eduard Khil singing a non-lexical vocable version of the song "I Am Very Glad, As I Am Finally Returning Back Home" (Russian: Я очень рад, ведь я, наконец, возвращаюсь домой) was uploaded to YouTube and became known as "Trololol" or "Trololo". The name "Trololo" is an onomatopoeia of the distinctive way Khil vocalizes throughout the song. The video quickly went viral and Khil became known as "Mr. Trololo" or "Trololo Man". The viral video also has been referred to as the Russian Rickroll.

The song was written by Arkady Ostrovsky. Besides Khil, it was also performed by Valery Obodzinsky, Hungarian singer János Koós, and by Muslim Magomayev on the Little Blue Light programme in the Soviet Union.

According to Khil, the Trololo song originally featured lyrics which described a narrative about a cowboy riding a horse to his farm:

Я скачу по прерии на своем жеребце, мустанге таком-то, а моя любимая Мэри за тысячу миль отсюда вяжет для меня чулок
I'm riding the prairie on my stallion, so-and-so mustang, and my beloved Mary is thousand miles away knitting a stocking for me.

The Trololo video first appeared on some sites beginning on 21 February 2010, the most prominent of those being the "Trololo" website trololololololololololo.com that helped push the video into popular awareness, receiving more than 3,000,000 hits in its first month. It gained prominence on 3 March 2010, during a segment on The Colbert Report after appearing on Red Eye w/ Greg Gutfeld a handful of times over the previous couple of weeks. It was also parodied by actor Christoph Waltz on Jimmy Kimmel Live! as well as Craig Reucassel of The Chaser on the 2010 Australian TV specials Yes We Canberra!, and in September 2011 on the animated American television series Family Guy in its tenth-season premiere episode, "Lottery Fever".

"Trololo"'s popularity in turn re-ignited interest in Khil's singing career aside from his vocalised performance; for a time, the "Trololo" website included a petition for Khil to come out of retirement to perform on a world tour.

I haven't heard anything about it. It's nice, of course! Thanks for good news! There is a backstory about this song. Originally, we had lyrics written for this song but they were poor. I mean, they were good, but we couldn't publish them at that time. They contained words like these: "I'm riding my stallion on a prairie, so-and-so mustang, and my beloved Mary is thousand miles away knitting a stocking for me". Of course, we failed to publish it at that time, and we, Arkady Ostrovsky and I, decided to make it a vocalisation. But the essence remained in the title. The song is very playful – it has no lyrics, so we had to make up something so that people would listen to it, and so this was an interesting arrangement.

— Eduard Khil, (in Russian)

Arkady Ostrovsky's son, Mikhail, gives another version of the vocalise story:

Nobody banned its lyrics, but my father just composed the music during the period of his disagreement with Lev Oshanin. The latter told him that the lyrics are more important in a song and that a composer is nothing without a lyricist. So Dad told him during the argument, "Well, I don't need your verses at all, I'll manage without them."

— Mikhail Ostrovsky, Rossiyskaya Gazeta, (in Russian)

Khil's son has said that his father does not really understand what the Internet is, and was quoted as saying "He thinks maybe someone is trying to make a fool of him," and "He keeps asking, 'Where were all these journalists 40 years ago?'"

Trololo was used by Butlin's in a television advertising campaign in the United Kingdom, as well as a United States ad campaign with the Volkswagen Beetle convertible that debuted during Super Bowl XLVII in 2013. It was also featured in the 2012 video game Ratchet & Clank: Full Frontal Assault. It was played briefly in the 2018 film Pacific Rim Uprising.

On 31 December 2011, Khil performed the Trololo song again live on a 2012 New Year's Russian holiday television special. Within the first week of January 2012, the new video of Khil performing his new version of the Trololo song had gone viral on YouTube again, earning over four million hits. Khil died later that year.

On 4 September 2017, Google displayed an interactive doodle of Khil singing the Trololo song to celebrate what would have been his 83rd birthday. Although it was released on the doodle site on 4 September, it was not released until the next day due to Labor Day in some countries.

== Awards ==
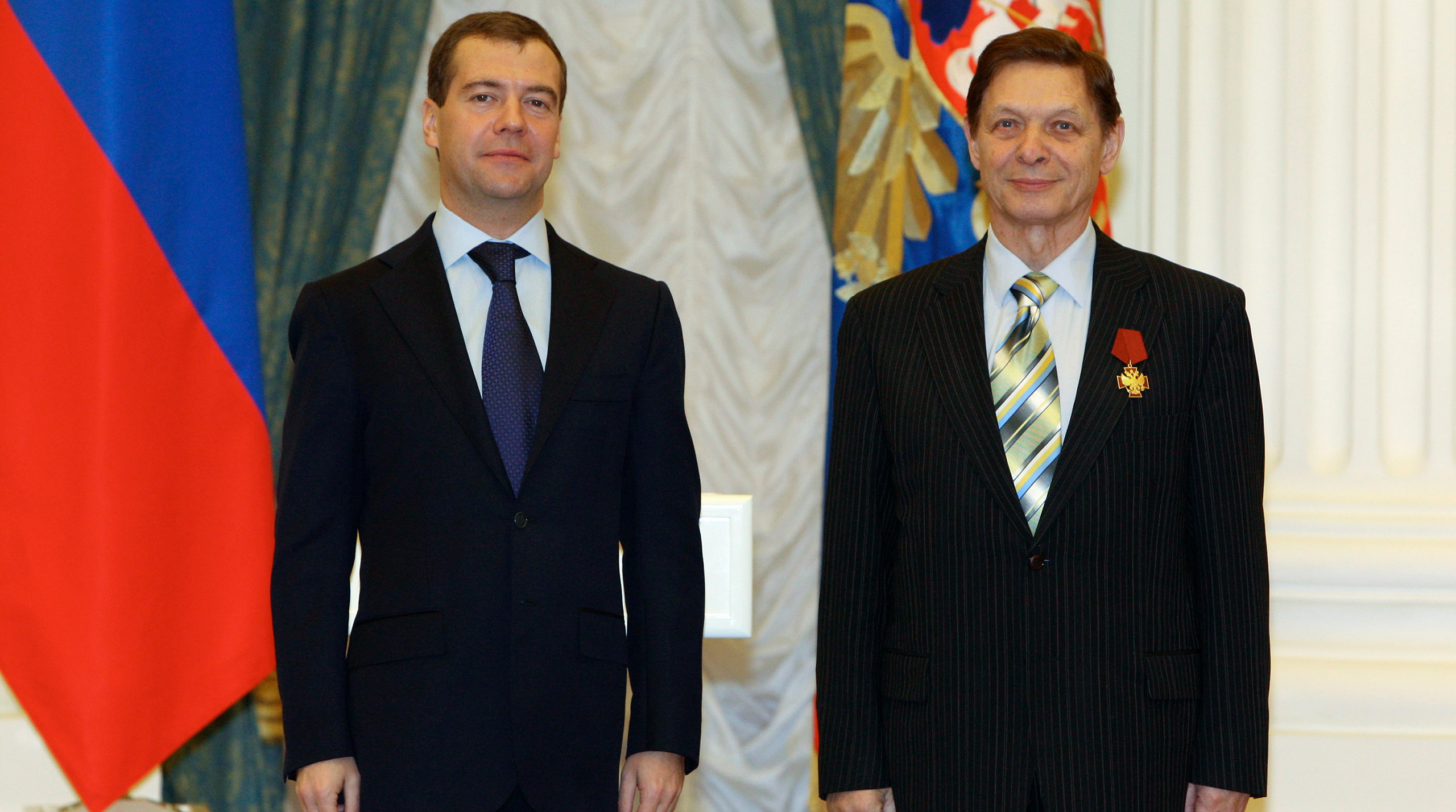
With Dmitry Medvedev on presentation of the Order "For Merit to the Fatherland", 4nd class (2 November 2009)

- Winner of Second All-Russian competition of performers (1962)
- Sopot International Song Festival second prize (1965)
- Honored Artist of the RSFSR (1968)
- Order of the Red Banner of Labour (1971)
- People's Artist of the RSFSR (1974)
- Lenin Komsomol Prize (1976)
- Order of Friendship of Peoples (1981)
- Order "For Merit to the Fatherland", 4th class (2009)
- Utesov Prize

== Filmography ==
- 1965 – Cheryomushki (Черёмушки) – vocal
- 1974 – Eduard Khil (documentary, directed by Marina Goldovskaya)
- 1985 – Golubye goroda (Голубые города, Blue Cities; film-concert, music by Andrei Petrov)
- 2004 – Yatinsotests – club manager
- 2011 – KikoRiki: Team Invincible – singer
