= Children's Aid Society (Ontario) =

Canadian non-governmental organizations

- Type: Provincial Children Protection services
- Legal status: Non-governmental organization
- Purpose: Child and family services
- Headquarters: Toronto, Ontario
- Region served: Canada
- Official language: English, French
- Website: www.oacas.org

Children's Aid Societies (CAS) are certified non-governmental child protection organizations in Ontario, Canada, which operate independently of the Ontario Ministry of Children, Community, and Youth Services to provide child protection services. The declared goal of CAS is to "promote the best interests, protection and well being of children".

== Mandate ==
Their principal functions are to:

- Investigate reports or evidence of abuse or neglect of children under the age of 18 or in the society's care or supervision, where necessary, take steps to protect the children
- Care for and supervise children who come under their care or supervision
- Counsel and support families for the protection of children or to prevent circumstances requiring the protection of children
- Place children for adoption

These societies receive funding from, and are under the supervision of the Ontario Ministry of Children, Community and Social Services. However, they are regarded as a non-governmental organization (NGO), which allows CASs a large degree of autonomy from interference or direction in the day-to-day running of the Societies by the Ministry. There are 49 children's aid societies across Ontario, including 11 Indigenous societies. An oversight body, known as The Child and Family Services Review Board, exists to investigate complaints against a CAS and maintains authority to issue orders against the Societies.

Children's Aid Societies also provide assessments, crisis intervention, counselling, and services to prevent child abuse and neglect. In addition, Children's Aid Societies help vulnerable families protect and support their children. Many prevention programs are offered in partnership with other community agencies. Child protection workers also work to support families in crisis where their children are not in need of protection. A child protection worker remains involved with the family to ensure the appropriate supports and community services are in place. In 2007/08, 24,955 families received ongoing support from Children's Aid Societies where a child was in need of protection.

=== Authority ===
Children's Aid Societies have authority under provincial legislation to remove children from homes where they face either a risk of harm, or have experienced harm. Children who cannot remain with caregivers are sometimes placed with other family members ("kin"), family friends ("kith"), or in customary care, which is an option for aboriginal children. In other cases, children can be placed into foster homes or group homes, as well as being adopted.

== Statistics ==
Over the 12-month period from April 1, 2007 to March 31, 2008, Ontario's Children's Aid Societies provided child welfare services to communities across Ontario. There were 77,089 allegations of child abuse and neglect investigated in Ontario. 27,816 children were in the care of Children's Aid Society for protection from abuse and neglect. Of the children who were cared for by a society during the year, 9,468 came into care upon completion of abuse investigations. Of these, 6,565 children had not previously been in care and 2,903 children were returned to care due to new child protection concerns. Less than 1% of Ontario's 3 million children were in the care of Children's Aid Societies in the year 2007.

Children's Aid Society claimed that most of the children who they visit remain in their homes; The number of children coming into care each year has continued to decline, in line with the general downward trend in Ontario's child population. In 2007–2008, 9,468 children came into care, a 26% decline compared to 2003–2004. The rate of admissions into care was 3 children per 1,000 of Ontario's children population. Ontario's leading academic study on child abuse and neglect states that exposure to intimate partner violence represents the largest proportion of substantiated maltreatment investigations. Almost half (48 percent) of all substantiated investigations identified exposure to intimate partner violence as the primary form of maltreatment (an estimated 20,443 investigations or 8.70 investigations per 1,000 children).

== Advocacy group membership ==
Ontario Association of Children's Aid Societies (OACAS) is a membership organization representing CASs in Ontario, Canada. Influencing government decisions, funding, and public opinion by promoting child welfare issues is a critical goal.

== Controversies ==
In 2011, Ryerson University (now Toronto Metropolitan University) published Powerful as God, a documentary which contained interviews with 26 individuals who had dealt with CAS agencies in the past. In the film, the interviewees raised concerns over the extent of power which CAS organizations possess, and the comparative of lack proper oversight by the Ontario government. They also made allegations of corruption, incompetence and improper practice among the CAS management.

In March 2013, The Toronto Star published an article about a leaked memo which would suggest that the CAS are funded on open cases and on a per-child basis. In the memo, Peel workers were urged to delay the closing of files for as long as possible sparking controversy with parents with open files and children in care. Families who are separated by court orders who should return were met with high resistance by the CAS. Some have alleged that this is proof of the CAS acting immorally to maximize their per-child funding by the government.

The Childrens Aid Societies relied extensively on hair strand testing performed by the Motherisk laboratory at Toronto's Hospital for Sick Children to determine if parents were substance abusers and potentially unfit to raise their children. Over more than two decades, many children were separated from their parents, sometimes permanently, as a result of such testing. In 2015, it was disclosed that the testing was faulty and performed by unqualified people, and the Ontario government directed the Societies to no longer use or rely on such testing in any court proceedings.
