= Tamara Miansarova =

Tamara Miansarova Тамара Миансарова
- Born: Tamara Grigoryevna Miansarova; 5 March 1931; Zinovievsk, Ukrainian SSR
- Died: 12 July 2017 (aged 86); Moscow, Russia
- Education: Moscow Conservatory
- Awards: Sopot International Song Festival (Winner, 1963)
- Musical career
- Origin: Moscow, Soviet Union
- Genre: Pop
- Occupation: Singer

Tamara Grigoryevna Miansarova (née Remnyova, Russian: Тамара Григорьевна Миансарова; 5 March 1931 – 12 July 2017) was a Soviet and Russian lyric soprano, pop singer and professor of Russian Academy of Theatre Arts, best known for her hit May There Always Be Sunshine.

== Biography ==
She was born on March 5, 1931, in Zinovievsk.

She received her education at a music school attached to the Minsk Conservatory, which she graduated in 1951. In the same year she entered the piano department of the Moscow Conservatory (class of Lev Oborin).

She died on July 12, 2017, in Moscow.

== Awards and recognition ==
- 1963: 1st prize at the Sopot International Song Festival, for the song "May There Always Be Sunshine"
- 1972: Meritorious Artist of the Ukrainian SSR
- 1996: People's Artist of Russia
- Order of Friendship of Peoples
- 2004: Miansarova get star on the Star Square in Moscow.

== Hits ==
Miansarova performed over 400 songs, many of them remembered as hits (their recording may be found at Miansarova's site).

- "Ginger", in the meaning of red haired man), a rendering the song "Rudy Rydz" by Helena Majdaniec, Queen of Polish Twist, the first Twist song performed in Russian on stage
- "Black Cat" It was the first Soviet Twist.
- "May There Always Be Sunshine"
- "Летка-енка" (for the fad dance Letkajenkka)
- "Let Us Never Quarrel"
- "Step, Step, a Toddler Is Stepping"
- "Eyes on the Sand"
