= Veronika Mavrikievna and Avdotya Nikitichna =

Fictional comedy duo

Veronika Mavrikievna and Avdotya Nikitichna was a comic variety duet of actors Vadim Tonkov and Boris Vladimirov, who performed in the Soviet Union from 1971 to 1982.

For the first time this duet appeared on January 1, 1971, in the telecast 'Terem-Teremok'. In the story, two grandmothers brought their grandchildren to a tree, and themselves began to gossip on different topics.

The pop duo was a regular participant of the 'Little Blue Light' and humorous programs of those years, where they played short reprises and whole numbers. Galina Brezhneva personally invited Vladimirov and Tonkov to address the wives of government members at an informal concert.

Duet Veronika Mavrikievna and Avdotya Nikitichna traveled a lot with tours around the USSR, there were also trips to Afghanistan during the war of 1979/1989.

The duo broke up in 1982. The artists began to perform separately. But Boris Vladimirov did not live long after that. He died in 1988 at the age of 56 years. His son Mikhail Vladimirov works in the Moscow Theater of Satire.

Vadim Tonkov died on January 27, 2001. He was buried in Moscow, at the Vagankovskoye Cemetery.

After the Soviet Union collapsed, a new duet, consist of Matryona Nigmatullina and Klavdiya Tsvetochek portrayed by Igor Kasilov and Sergei Chvanov, commenced.
