= David Juurlink =

Canadian physician and pharmacologist (born 1968)

- Born: 1968 (age 57–58); New Glasgow, Nova Scotia, Canada
- Education: Dalhousie University
- Scientific career
- Fields: Clinical pharmacology, toxicology, internal medicine
- Workplaces: Sunnybrook Health Sciences Centre, University of Toronto, Ontario Poison Centre, ICES

David Juurlink (/ˈjʊərlɪŋk/ YURE-link; born 1968) is a Canadian physician, clinical pharmacologist and toxicologist. He is a professor at the University of Toronto and has worked at Sunnybrook Health Sciences Centre, the Ontario Poison Centre and ICES. His research concerns adverse drug reactions, drug interactions, medication safety and the risks associated with opioid prescribing.

Juurlink has criticized prescribing practices involving opioids, particularly fentanyl and tramadol. In 2017, he co-authored an analysis of a frequently cited 1980 letter in The New England Journal of Medicine that had been used to support claims that addiction was uncommon among patients prescribed opioids.

He has also been involved in a dispute over research by Canadian pharmacologist Gideon Koren, particularly a 2006 study attributing an infant's death to morphine transmitted through breast milk. Juurlink questioned the study's conclusions after examining toxicological evidence that had not been included in the published report. The study was retracted by The Lancet in November 2026 following an investigation by the Hospital for Sick Children in Toronto.

== Early life and education ==
Juurlink was born in 1968 and grew up in New Glasgow, Nova Scotia. His parents operated the West Side Drive-In, a local restaurant where he worked during his childhood. He became interested in pharmacy while attending high school and subsequently studied at Dalhousie University in Halifax. During his university studies, he worked at pharmacies in New Glasgow.

Juurlink later attended medical school and specialized in clinical pharmacology and toxicology. His interest in opioid medications developed partly through his experience working in pharmacies, where he encountered patients purchasing codeine-containing products.

== Medical career ==
Juurlink has held clinical and research positions in Toronto, including head of the Division of Clinical Pharmacology and Toxicology at Sunnybrook Health Sciences Centre, medical toxicologist at the Ontario Poison Centre and scientist at ICES, formerly the Institute for Clinical Evaluative Sciences. He has also held an academic appointment at the University of Toronto.

His research has examined adverse drug reactions, interactions between commonly prescribed medications and the consequences of opioid use. Some of his research was supported by a New Investigator Award from the Canadian Institutes of Health Research.

=== Opioid prescribing ===
Juurlink has criticized the prescribing of opioid medications and argued that physicians have contributed to opioid-related harms. In August 2015, he called on members of the medical profession to acknowledge their role in fentanyl-related overdoses in Canada.

In April 2016, he criticized prescribing practices involving fentanyl, arguing that excessive prescribing had contributed to fatal overdoses. In February 2017, he questioned Health Canada's regulatory treatment of tramadol, arguing that the medication's opioid-related risks warranted greater attention.

In June 2017, Juurlink co-authored an analysis of citations to a five-sentence letter published in The New England Journal of Medicine in 1980. The letter, known as "Addiction Rare in Patients Treated with Narcotics", had reported that addiction was uncommon among hospitalized patients receiving opioid medications. The researchers found that subsequent publications frequently cited the letter without acknowledging its limited scope, including when discussing the risks of addiction among patients receiving opioids outside hospitals.

== Criticism of codeine and breastfeeding research ==
=== 2006 case report ===
Juurlink questioned the findings of a 2006 case report published in The Lancet by Gideon Koren and colleagues. The paper attributed the death of a 12-day-old Ontario infant in 2005 to morphine poisoning resulting from codeine taken by his breastfeeding mother. The researchers proposed that the mother's ability to metabolize codeine into morphine had caused unusually high concentrations of morphine to pass into her breast milk. The report subsequently influenced medical guidance concerning the use of codeine during breastfeeding.

Juurlink had previously trained under Koren and co-authored research with him. In 2010, following a discussion with British toxicologist Nicholas Bateman at a medical conference, he began reviewing the evidence underlying the case report. Bateman had questioned whether the concentrations of morphine detected in the infant could have resulted from exposure through breast milk.

Juurlink examined research concerning the transfer of codeine and morphine into breast milk and concluded that the published findings did not adequately explain the infant's toxicological results. He contacted Ontario's chief coroner, Andrew McCallum, who invited him to review the coroner's records and prepare an independent assessment.

=== Review of toxicological evidence ===
In reviewing the coroner's records, Juurlink found that the infant's blood contained codeine and acetaminophen as well as morphine. Codeine had also been detected in the infant's stomach contents. These findings had not been disclosed in the published case report.

Juurlink concluded that the concentrations of the drugs were inconsistent with exposure exclusively through breast milk and suggested that the infant might have received a codeine-containing medication directly. He submitted his findings to the coroner's office in November 2011. According to a 2026 investigation by The New Yorker, the coroner's office subsequently sought a response from Koren, but Juurlink did not receive a substantive follow-up concerning his assessment.

Juurlink continued to question the study and other publications concerning opioid exposure through breastfeeding. His review included a separate case report by Koren and pediatrician Michael Rieder concerning an infant referred to as "Baby Boy Blue". According to The New Yorker, Rieder subsequently acknowledged to Juurlink that the case had been invented for educational purposes, although the published report had not identified it as fictional.

Juurlink also worked with researcher Jonathan Zipursky on a study examining opioid prescribing after childbirth and infant outcomes. Their research used data involving approximately 170,000 mothers to examine the association between postpartum opioid prescriptions and adverse outcomes among infants.

=== 2026 retraction ===
In January 2026, The New Yorker published an investigation by journalist Ben Taub examining the infant's death, the toxicological evidence and Juurlink's efforts to challenge the published findings. In February, The Lancet issued an expression of concern regarding the 2006 study.

In November 2026, The Lancet formally retracted the study following an investigation by the Hospital for Sick Children's research integrity office. The investigation concluded that the omission of material toxicological evidence, including the infant's blood codeine and acetaminophen concentrations and the identification of codeine in his stomach contents, constituted falsification under the hospital's research integrity policy. The journal stated that the omissions prevented readers from adequately assessing the paper's conclusions.

Following the retraction, Juurlink argued that the study had influenced postpartum pain management and discouraged some women taking opioid medications from breastfeeding. He also criticized the length of time taken to retract the paper, attributing the delay to institutional failures and crediting investigative journalism with bringing the problems to public attention.
