= Gabrielle (Hootenanny Singers song) =

Song by Swedish band Hootenanny Singers

Single by The Hootenanny Singers

from the album The Hootenanny Singers (1964)
- Language: Swedish
- B-side: "I lunden gröna"
- Genre: Folk, pop
- Length: 2:55
- Label: Fontana (Europe), Ascot (US)

The Hootenanny Singers singles chronology
"Darlin'" (1964)	"Gabrielle" (1964)	"La Mamma" (1964)

"Gabrielle" is a song by Swedish band the Hootenanny Singers. The tune was based on "May There Always Be Sunshine". "Gabrielle" was a successful single in the Scandinavian region and led the Hootenanny Singers to international exposure.

== Background ==
=== Release ===
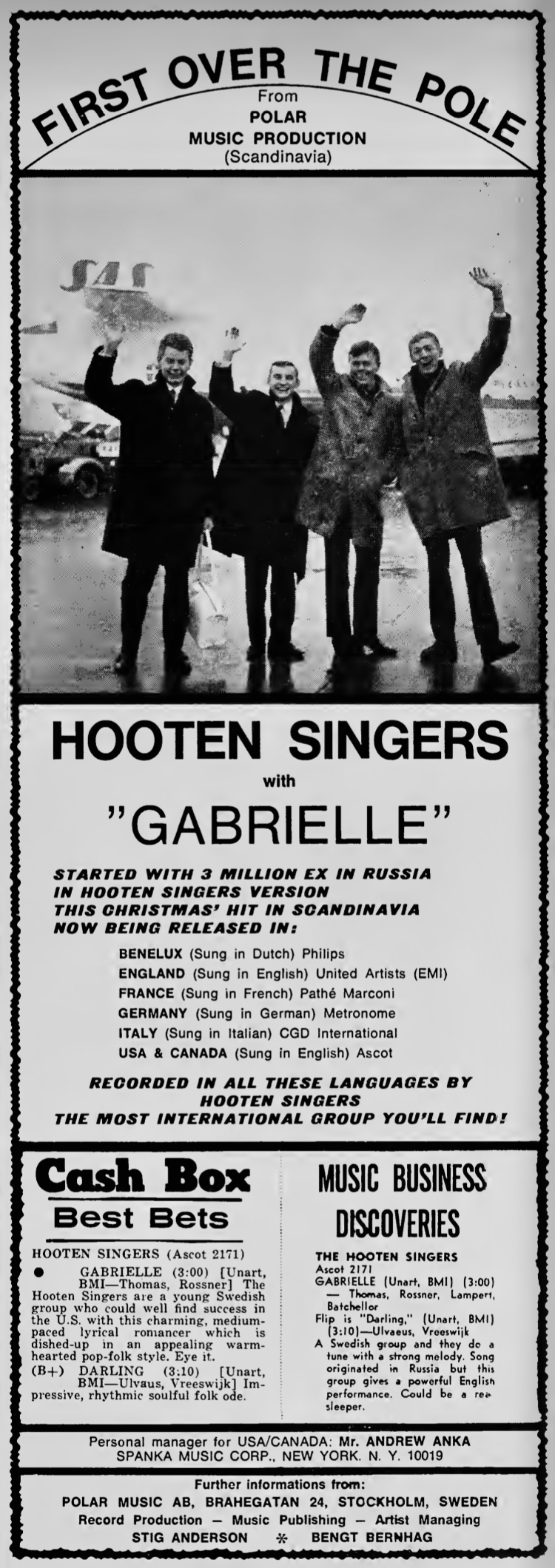
Promotion of Gabrielle by the Hootenanny Singers (renamed Hooten Singers)

In autumn 1964, the band released their second album "The Hootenanny Singers" which included "Gabrielle" as the opening track. "Gabrielle" was also included in an EP released in Sweden in September 1964. The EP also included other songs such as "La Mamma"

After reaching No. 5 on the Swedish Kvällstoppen charts in December 1965, No. 6 in the Norwegian charts, "Gabrielle" had been recorded in German, Finnish, Italian, Dutch, and English. The Finnish version had reached No.2 in the Finnish charts.

Negotiations had been made by Stig Anderson, the manager of Polar Music, for the Hootenanny Singers to record and release the single internationally throughout 1964 and 1965. It was the intention for the Hootenanny Singers to record a debut single in Germany, recorded in the German language as early as January 1964. Two German record labels had been interested in presenting the band. The German version of Gabrielle titled "Denk' Daran" had been released as a B-side to "La Mamma" on the Metronome label. Andersson had also travelled to Holland by March 1965 and during the success of the single in Scandinavia, Anderson travelled to London, New York to establish a United Artists Records release and Paris.

By December 1964, Billboard announced that the English version of Gabrielle would be released in the United States in the following month. Cashbox rated the single B+ (meaning 'very good'), and it received positive reviews: "The Hooten singers are a young Swedish group who could well find success in the U.S. with this charming, medium paced lyrical romancer which is dished up in an appealing warm hearted pop folk style.", For the B-side, "Darling", it was described as an "impressive, rhythmic soulful folk ode".

In a Cashbox review, the magazine stated "A Swedish group and they do a tune with a strong melody. Song originated in Russia but this group gives a powerful English performance. Could be a real sleeper." Cashbox stated that the group recorded Gabrielle in French which was to be released as part of an EP, but it is unknown if this version exists.

Despite the positive reviews, the singles did not chart internationally.

=== Controversy ===
Due to a lack of international copyright agreements, songs from the Soviet Union were then considered to be in the public domain. Stig Anderson and Bengt Bernhag, co-founders of the band's production company Polar Music, claimed credits for the song's arrangement and Swedish lyrics. Russian media sources would later describe this as plagiarism or theft.

== International releases ==
Norway and Denmark (TF 269 047)

A. "Gabrielle" (Swedish version)
B. "I lunden gröna"

USA, Canada and England (UA 2171)

A. "Gabrielle" (English version)
B. "Darling"

Netherlands (TF 269 047)

A. "Gabrielle" (Dutch version)
B. "Zuidenwind-Noordenwind" (Dutch version of Jag väntar vid min mila)

Netherlands (TF 269 047)

A. "Gabrielle" (Italian version)
B. "Fermati in me" (Italian version of Stanna En Stund)

== Charts ==
Chart (1964–1965)	Peak position
Sweden (Kvällstoppen)	5
Sweden (Svensktoppen)	2
Norway	6
Finland	2
