= Arkady Ostrovsky =

Russian composer

- Born: Arkady (Avraam) Il'ich Ostrovsky; February 25 [O.S. February 12] 1914; Syzran, Syzransky Uyezd, Simbirsk Governorate, Russian Empire
- Died: September 18, 1967 (aged 53); Sochi, Russian SFSR, Soviet Union
- Resting place: Novodevichy Cemetery, Moscow
- Occupation: Composer

Arkady (Avraam) Il'ich Ostrovsky (also spelled Ostrovskij, Ostrovskyj Russian: Аркадий (Авраам) Ильич Островский) (February 25 [O.S. February 12], 1914 – September 18, 1967) was a Soviet Russian composer of light music, the author of the song May There Always Be Sunshine and other Soviet songs of the 1960s, including the lullaby of Good Night, Little Ones, the children's TV program aired for nearly 60 years, most famous rendition sung by Oleg Anofriyev.

== Life ==
Ostrovsky was born to a Jewish family in Syzran. From 1927 on, he lived in Leningrad. He worked in Leonid Utyosov's Jazz Orchestra from 1940 to 1947 and composed his first works.

He died in Sochi in 1967. In 2004, Ostrovsky got a star posthumously on the Star Square in Moscow.

== Internet meme ==
In 2009, a 1976 video of singer Eduard Khil singing Ostrovsky's vocalise I am very glad, because I’m finally going home (Я очень рад, ведь я, наконец, возвращаюсь домой) was uploaded to YouTube and quickly became an Internet meme known as "Trololololololololololo." The song itself was written by Ostrovsky, and was also performed by Valery Obodzinsky and by Muslim Magomayev on Little Blue Light.

Ostrovsky's son, Mikhail, is quoted as saying:

We have been friends with Edik for about forty years. Dad valued him highly, and had he lived to this day he would be terribly happy to learn of the world-wide popularity of Vocalise. For him, the most important reward was not money but the popularity of his songs. You should have seen what used to happen to him when he met a group of people singing his hit loud.

— Mikhail Ostrovsky, Rossiyskaya Gazeta (in Russian)

Original quote in Russian
С Эдиком мы дружим уже лет сорок. Папа его очень ценил. И доживи он до сегодняшнего дня, он был бы безумно счастлив мировой популярности "Вокализа". Для него всегда главной наградой были не деньги, а популярность его песен. Вы бы видели, что с ним творилось, когда он встречал на улице компанию, горланящую его шлягер.

== Hootenanny Singers ==
Ostrovsky is the author of dozens of popular songs in the post-Soviet countries. For example he is author of music for the song "Let there always be sunshine", which was "taken" under the name of 'Gabriel' into repertoire of the Swedish band 'Hootenanny Singer' without specifying the author.

In Russian https://www.youtube.com/watch?v=WFhphQcHpUY

In English https://www.youtube.com/watch?v=OKskFdD-0Fk
