= Addiction Rare in Patients Treated with Narcotics =

1980 letter published in The New England Journal of Medicine

"Addiction Rare in Patients Treated with Narcotics" is the title of a letter to the editor published in The New England Journal of Medicine in 1980. Having examined records of patients treated with narcotics in a hospital setting, the authors concluded that this rarely led to addiction in patients with no history of addiction. This letter was later repeatedly misrepresented to support the idea that opioids are not addictive when prescribed for use at home. This misrepresentation has been blamed for contributing to the opioid epidemic in the United States.

== Origin ==
Fearing addiction, doctors had often been hesitant to prescribe narcotics for pain. Wondering how frequently hospitalized patients became addicted to painkillers, Boston University doctor Hershel Jick examined records in a database he had built. Graduate student Jane Porter helped with the calculations, and was credited as co-author of the letter which reported their findings. The five-sentence letter was published in the January 10, 1980, issue of The New England Journal of Medicine, appearing on page 123. Its text read, in its entirety:

Recently, we examined our current files to determine the incidence of narcotic addiction in 39,946 hospitalized medical patients who were monitored consecutively. Although there were 11,882 patients who received at least one narcotic preparation, there were only four cases of reasonably well documented addiction in patients who had no history of addiction. The addiction was considered major in only one instance. The drugs implicated were meperidine in two patients, Percodan in one, and hydromorphone in one. We conclude that despite widespread use of narcotic drugs in hospitals, the development of addiction is rare in medical patients with no history of addiction.

== Influence ==
Porter and Jick, as the letter came to be known, was later cited frequently as evidence that prescription painkiller addiction was very rare. Until full journal archives were placed online in 2010, the letter itself could only be found in a physical copy of the journal issue in which it appeared, so many of those who cited it may not have actually read it. It was thus perhaps overlooked that the patients in question were all given opioids in small doses in a hospital, not as long-term prescriptions to take on their own. Additionally, in 2003, Jick told The New York Times that the study did not follow patients after they left the hospital.

In 2017, The New England Journal of Medicine published a bibliographic analysis of the letter showing that it had been cited 608 times since it was published. Of these 608 citations, it was found that 72.2% cited it in support of the claim that patients treated with opioids rarely developed addiction, and 80.8% did not mention that the data only concerned patients who were hospitalized at the time opioids were prescribed to them. The analysis concluded that the letter "was heavily and uncritically cited as evidence that addiction was rare with long-term opioid therapy", and that "this citation pattern contributed to the North American opioid crisis" by minimizing concerns about prescribing opioids.

The letter was also misrepresented in the popular media. A 1990 Scientific American article described it as an "extensive study," and a 2001 Time story dubbed it a "landmark study" showing that concerns about opioid addiction were "basically unwarranted." In addition, Purdue Pharma, the manufacturer of OxyContin, trained its sales representatives to say that the risk of addiction among patients using the drug was less than one percent, citing Porter and Jick's letter as a source.

Such misrepresentations have been blamed for contributing to the opioid epidemic. David Juurlink, a co-author of the 2017 bibliographic analysis, has stated that he thinks the letter's appearance in a prestigious journal helped convince doctors that opioids were safe, saying, "I don't think it mattered that it didn't say much, what mattered was its title and its publication, and those two things went a long way." Hershel Jick, who co-wrote the letter, said that it was of little consequence at the time, and drug companies later misused it to market new pain drugs.
