= Scat singing =

Vocal improvisation with wordless vocables, nonsense syllables or without words at all

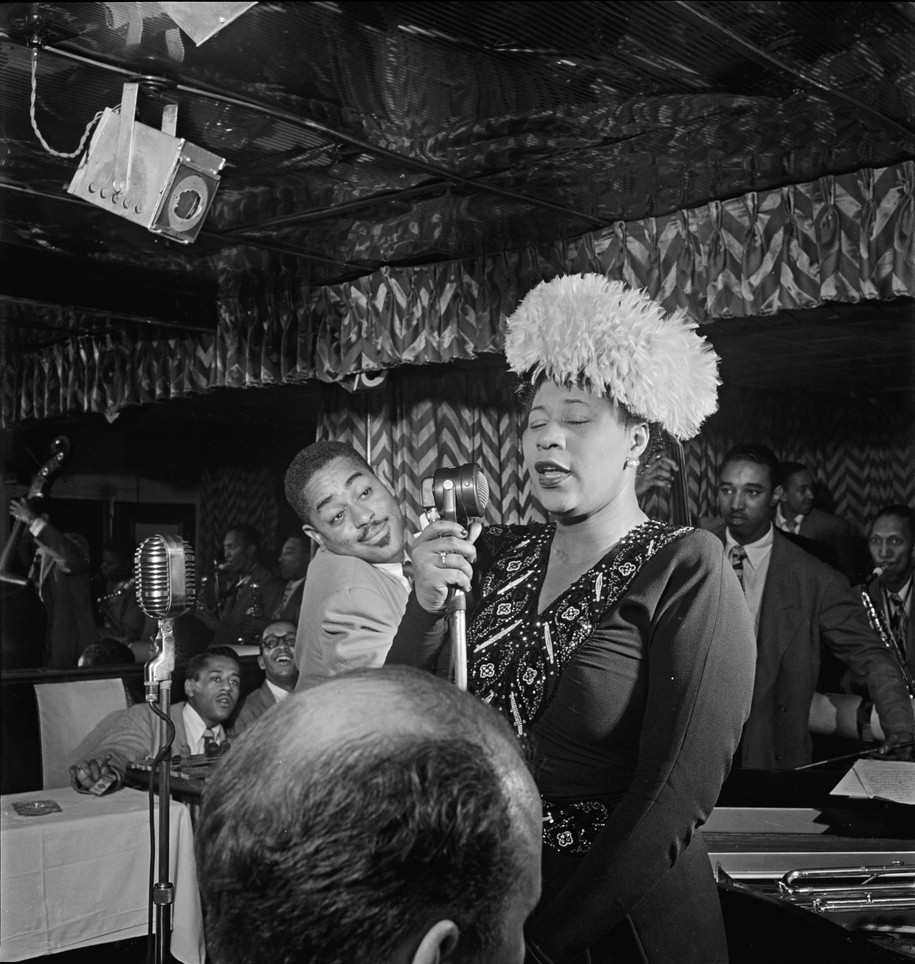
Ella Fitzgerald is considered to be one of the greatest scat singers in jazz history

Originating in vocal jazz, scat singing or scatting is vocal improvisation with wordless vocables, nonsense syllables or without words at all. In scat singing, the singer improvises melodies and rhythms using the voice solely as an instrument rather than a speaking medium. This is different from vocalese, which uses recognizable lyrics that are sung to pre-existing instrumental solos.

== Characteristics ==
=== Structure and syllable choice ===
Though scat singing is improvised, the melodic lines are often variations on scale and arpeggio fragments, stock patterns and riffs, as is the case with instrumental improvisers. Additionally, scatting usually incorporates musical structure. All of Ella Fitzgerald's scat performances of "How High the Moon", for instance, use the same tempo, begin with a chorus of a straight reading of the lyric, move to a "specialty chorus" introducing the scat chorus, and then the scat itself. Will Friedwald has compared Ella Fitzgerald to Chuck Jones directing his Roadrunner cartoon—each uses predetermined formulas in innovative ways.

The deliberate choice of scat syllables is also a key element in vocal jazz improvisation. Syllable choice influences the pitch, articulation, coloration, and resonance of the performance. Syllable choice also differentiated jazz singers' personal styles: Betty Carter was inclined to use sounds like "louie-ooie-la-la-la" (soft-tongued sounds or liquids) while Sarah Vaughan would prefer "shoo-doo-shoo-bee-ooo-bee" (fricatives, plosives, and close vowels). The choice of scat syllables can also be used to reflect the sounds of different instruments. The comparison of the scatting styles of Ella Fitzgerald and Sarah Vaughan reveals that Fitzgerald's improvisation mimics (Note: In her 1949 performance of "Flyin' Home," Fitzgerald alternates the bilabial "b" and "p" plosives with the alveolar plosive "d". The "b" and "p" sounds are formed similarly to the sounds of jazz wind instruments, which sound by the release of built-up mouth air pressure onto the reed, while the "d" sound is similar to the tonguing on jazz brass instruments. William Stewart, a Seattle researcher, has proposed that this alternation simulates the exchange of riffs between the wind and brass sections that is common in big bands.) the sounds of swing-era big bands with which she performed, while Vaughan's mimics (Note: Sarah Vaughan tends to use the fricative consonant "sh" along with the low, back of the mouth "ah" vowel. The "sh" closely resembles the sound of brushes, common in the bop era, on drum heads; the "ah" vowel resonates similarly to the bass drum.) that of her accompanying bop-era small combos.

=== Humor and quotation ===
Humor is another important element of scat singing. Bandleader Cab Calloway exemplified the use of humorous scatting. Other examples of humorous scatting include Slim Gaillard, Leo Watson, and Bam Brown's 1945 song "Avocado Seed Soup Symphony," in which the singers scat variations on the word "avocado" for much of the recording.

In addition to such nonsensical uses of language, humor is communicated in scat singing through the use of musical quotation. Leo Watson, who performed before the canon of American popular music, frequently drew on nursery rhymes in his scatting. This is called using a compression. Similarly, Ella Fitzgerald's scatting, for example, drew extensively on popular music. In her 1960 recording of "How High the Moon" live in Berlin, she quotes over a dozen songs, including "The Peanut Vendor," "Heat Wave," "A-Tisket, A-Tasket," and "Smoke Gets in Your Eyes."

== History ==
=== Origins ===
"That Haunting Melody" (1911) excerpt
Al Jolson's scatting during his 1911 recording of "That Haunting Melody" has been cited as one of the earliest examples of scat singing

Improvisational singing of nonsense syllables occurs in many cultures, such as diddling or lilting in Ireland, German yodeling, Sámi joik, and speaking in tongues in various religious traditions.

Although Louis Armstrong's 1926 recording of "Heebie Jeebies" is often cited as the first modern song to employ scatting, there are many earlier examples. One early master of ragtime scat singing was Gene Greene who recorded scat choruses in his song "King of the Bungaloos" and several others between 1911 and 1917. Entertainer Al Jolson scatted through a few bars in the middle of his 1911 recording of "That Haunting Melody." Gene Greene's 1917 "From Here to Shanghai," which featured faux-Chinese scatting, and Gene Rodemich's 1924 "Scissor Grinder Joe" and "Some of These Days" also pre-date Armstrong. Cliff "Ukulele Ike" Edwards scatted an interlude on his 1923 "Old Fashioned Love" in lieu of using an instrumental soloist. One of the early female singers to use scat was Aileen Stanley, who included it at the end of a duet with Billy Murray in their hit 1924 recording of "It Had To Be You" (Victor 19373).

Jazz pianist Jelly Roll Morton credited Joe Sims of Vicksburg, Mississippi, as the creator of scat around the turn of the 20th century. In a conversation between Alan Lomax and Jelly Roll Morton, Morton recounted the history of scat:

Lomax: "Well, what about some more scat songs, that you used to sing way back then?"
Morton: "Oh, I'll sing you some scat songs. That was way before Louis Armstrong's time. By the way, scat is something that a lot of people don't understand, and they begin to believe that the first scat numbers was ever done, was done by one of my hometown boys, Louis Armstrong. But I must take the credit away, since I know better. The first man that ever did a scat number in history of this country was a man from Vicksburg, Mississippi, by the name of Joe Sims, an old comedian. And from that, Tony Jackson and myself, and several more grabbed it in New Orleans. And found it was pretty good for an introduction of a song."
Lomax: "What does scat mean?"
Morton: "Scat doesn't mean anything but just something to give a song a flavor."

Morton also once boasted, "Tony Jackson and myself were using scat for novelty back in 1906 and 1907 when Louis Armstrong was still in the orphan's home." Don Redman and Fletcher Henderson also featured scat vocals in their 1925 recording of "My Papa Doesn't Two-Time No Time" five months prior to Armstrong's 1926 recording of "Heebie Jeebies."

=== Heebie Jeebies ===
"Heebie Jeebies" (1926) excerpt
Louis Armstrong's 1926 recording of "Heebie Jeebies" was the most influential early example of scat singing.

It was Armstrong's February 1926 performance of "Heebie Jeebies," however, that is considered the turning point for the medium. From the 1926 recording of "Heebie Jeebies" arose the techniques that would form the foundation of modern scat. In a possibly apocryphal story, Armstrong claimed that, when he was recording "Heebie Jeebies" with his band The Hot Five, his sheet music fell off the stand and onto the ground. Not knowing the lyrics to the song, he invented a gibberish melody to fill time, expecting the cut to be thrown out in the end, but that take of the song was the one released:

"I dropped the paper with the lyrics—right in the middle of the tune. . . And I did not want to stop and spoil the record which was moving along so wonderfully . . . So when I dropped the paper, I immediately turned back into the horn and started to scatting . . . Just as nothing had happened . . . When I finished the record I just knew the recording people would throw it out . . . And to my surprise they all came running out of the controlling booth and said—'Leave That In.'"

Armstrong's "Heebie Jeebies" became a national bestseller and, consequently, the practice of scatting "became closely associated with Armstrong." The song would serve as a model for Cab Calloway, whose 1930s scat solos inspired George Gershwin's use of the medium in his 1935 opera Porgy and Bess.

=== Widespread adoption ===
"Mississippi Mud" (1927) excerpt
The Rhythm Boys scat on their 1927 recording of "Mississippi Mud / I Left My Sugar Standing in the Rain." Harry Barris mimics the sound of a cymbal.

"The Mooche" (1928) excerpt
Sample of "The Mooche" with scat singing by Gertrude "Baby" Cox.

Following the success of Armstrong's "Heebie Jeebies," a number of popular songs featured scat singing. In June 1927, Harry Barris and Bing Crosby of bandleader Paul Whiteman's "The Rhythm Boys" scatted on several songs including "Mississippi Mud," which Barris had composed.

On October 26, 1927, Duke Ellington's Orchestra recorded "Creole Love Call" featuring Adelaide Hall singing wordlessly. Hall's wordless vocals and "evocative growls" were hailed as serving as "another instrument." Although creativity must be shared between Ellington and Hall as he knew the style of performance he wanted, Hall was the one who was able to produce the sound. A year later, in October 1928, Ellington repeated the experiment in one of his versions of "The Mooche," with Getrude "Baby" Cox singing scat after a muted similar trombone solo by Joe "Tricky Sam" Nanton.

"It Don't Mean a Thing" (1932) excerpt
Sample of "It Don't Mean a Thing (If It Ain't Got That Swing)" with scat singing by The Boswell Sisters.

During the Great Depression, acts such as The Boswell Sisters regularly employed scatting on their records, including the high complexity of scatting at the same time, in harmony. An example is their version of "It Don't Mean a Thing (If It Ain't Got That Swing)." The Boswell Sisters' "inventive use of scat singing was a source for Ella Fitzgerald." As a young girl, Fitzgerald often practiced imitating Connee Boswell's scatting for hours.

Fitzgerald herself would become a talented scat singer and later claimed to be the "best vocal improviser jazz has ever had," and critics since then have been in almost universal agreement with her. During this 1930s era, other famous scat singers included Scatman Crothers—who would go on to movie and television fame—and British dance band trumpeter and vocalist Nat Gonella whose scat-singing recordings were banned (Note: Scott 2017, p. 302: In 1930s "Nazi Germany, the records of British trumpeter and bandleader Nat Gonella were banned there and scat singing was a criminal offence.") in Nazi Germany.

=== Later development ===
Over the years, as jazz music developed and grew in complexity, scat singing did as well. During the bop era of the 1940s, more highly developed vocal improvisation surged in popularity. Annie Ross, a bop singer, expressed a common sentiment among vocalists at the time: "The [scat] music was so exciting, everyone wanted to do it." And many did: Eddie Jefferson, Betty Carter, Anita O'Day, Joe Carroll, Sarah Vaughan, Carmen McRae, Jon Hendricks, Babs Gonzales, Mel Torme and Dizzy Gillespie were all singers in the idiom.

Free jazz and the influence of world musicians on the medium pushed jazz singing nearer to avant-garde art music. In the 1960s Ward Swingle was the product of an unusually liberal musical education. He took the scat singing idea and applied it to the works of Bach, creating The Swingle Singers. Scat singing was also used by Louis Prima and others in the song "I Wan'na Be Like You" in Disney's The Jungle Book (1967).

The bop revival of the 1970s renewed interest in bop scat singing, and young scat singers viewed themselves as a continuation of the classic bop tradition. The medium continues to evolve, and vocal improvisation now often develops independently of changes in instrumental jazz.

During the mid-1990s, jazz artist John Paul Larkin (better known as Scatman John) renewed interest in the genre briefly when he began fusing jazz singing with pop music and eurodance, scoring a world-wide hit with the song "Scatman (Ski Ba Bop Ba Dop Bop)" in 1994. Vocal improviser Bobby McFerrin's performances have shown that "wordless singing has traveled far from the concepts demonstrated by Louis Armstrong, Gladys Bentley, Cab Calloway, Anita O'Day, and Leo Watson."

=== Vocal bass ===
Vocal bass is a form of scat singing that is intended to vocally simulate instrumental basslines that are typically performed by bass players. A technique most commonly used by bass singers in a cappella groups is to simulate an instrumental rhythm section, often alongside a vocal percussionist or beatboxer. Some notable vocal bass artists are Tim Foust, Adam Chance, Bobby McFerrin, Al Jarreau, Reggie Watts, Alvin Chea, Joe Santoni, Avi Kaplan, Matt Sallee, Chris Morey, Geoff Castellucci.

=== Use in hip-hop ===
Many hip-hop artists and rappers use scat singing to come up with the rhythms of their raps. Tajai of the group Souls of Mischief states the following in the book How to Rap: "Sometimes my rhythms come from scatting. I usually make a scat kind of skeleton and then fill in the words. I make a skeleton of the flow first, and then I put words into it." The group Lifesavas describe a similar process. Rapper Tech N9ne has been recorded demonstrating exactly how this method works, and gangsta rapper Eazy-E used it extensively in his song "Eazy Street."

== Historical theories ==
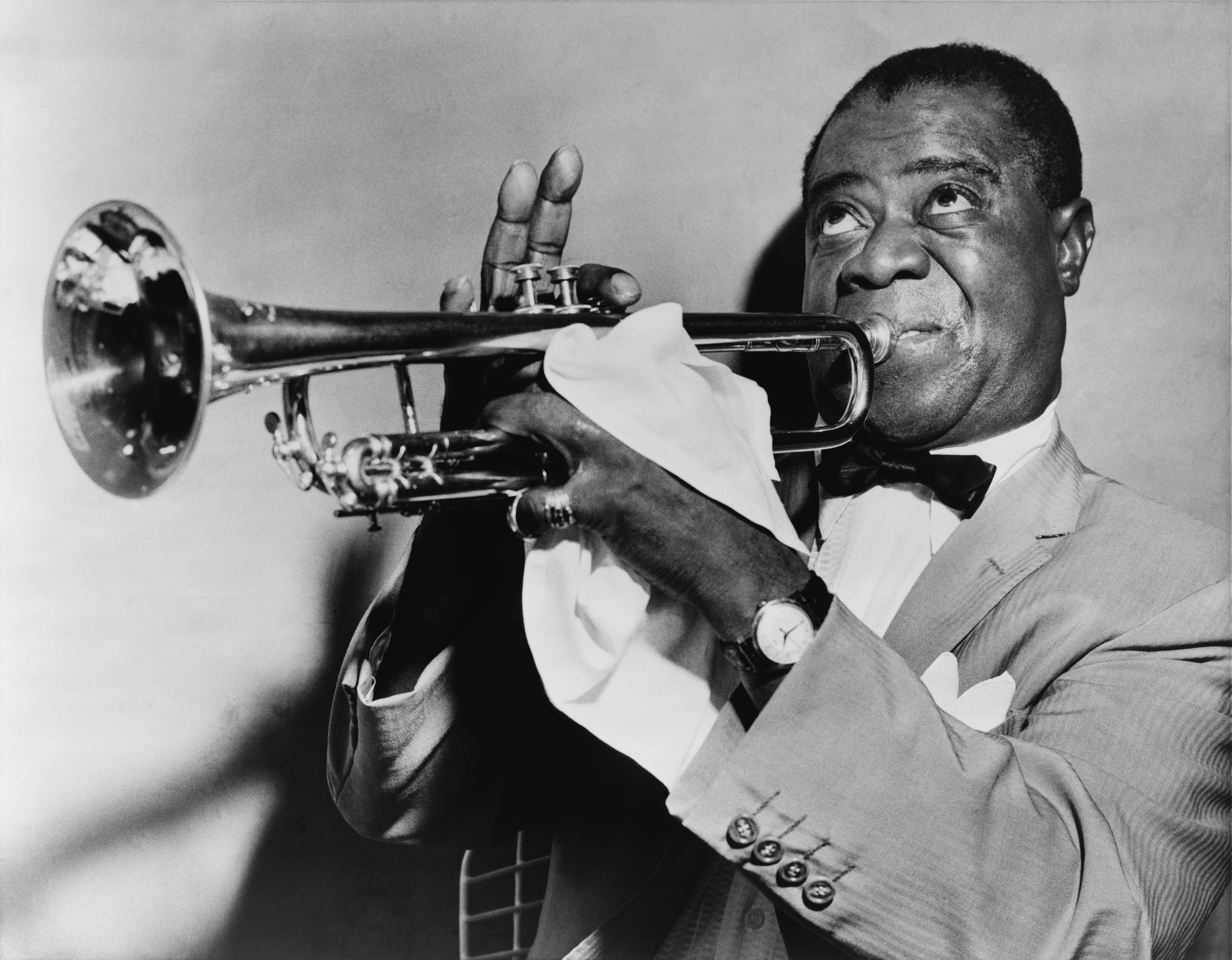
Paul Berliner has suggested that scat singing arose from instrumental soloists like Louis Armstrong (pictured) formulating jazz riffs vocally

Some writers have proposed that scat has its roots in African musical traditions. In much African music, "human voice and instruments assume a kind of musical parity" and are "at times so close in timbre and so inextricably interwoven within the music's fabric as to be nearly indistinguishable." Dick Higgins likewise attributes scat singing to traditions of sound poetry in African-American music. In West African music, it is typical to convert drum rhythms into vocal melodies; common rhythmic patterns are assigned specific syllabic translations. However, this theory fails to account for the existence—even in the earliest recorded examples of scatting—of free improvisation by the vocalist. It is therefore more likely that scat singing evolved independently in the United States.

Others have proposed that scat singing arose from jazz musicians' practice of formulating riffs vocally before performing them instrumentally. (The adage "If you can't sing it, you can't play it" was common in the early New Orleans jazz scene.) In this manner, soloists like Louis Armstrong became able to double as vocalists, switching effortlessly between instrumental solos and scatting.

Scat singing also resembles the Irish/Scottish practice of lilting or diddling, a type of vocal music that involves using nonsensical syllables to sing non-vocal dance tunes.

== Critical assessment ==
Scat singing can allow jazz singers to have the same improvisational opportunities as jazz instrumentalists: scatting can be rhythmically and harmonically improvisational without concern about the lyric. Especially when bebop was developing, singers found scat to be the best way to adequately engage in the performance of jazz.

Scatting may be desirable because it does not "taint the music with the impurity of denotation." Instead of conveying linguistic content and pointing to something outside itself, scat music—like instrumental music—is self-referential and "d[oes] what it mean[s]." Through this wordlessness, commentators have written, scat singing can describe matters beyond words. Music critic Will Friedwald has written that Louis Armstrong's scatting, for example, "has tapped into his own core of emotion," releasing emotions "so deep, so real" that they are unspeakable; his words "bypass our ears and our brains and go directly for our hearts and souls."

Scat singing has never been universally accepted, even by jazz enthusiasts. Writer and critic Leonard Feather offers an extreme view; he once said that "scat singing—with only a couple exceptions—should be banned." He also wrote the lyrics to the jazz song "Whisper Not," which Ella Fitzgerald then recorded on her 1966 Verve release of the same name. Many jazz singers, including Bessie Smith, Billie Holiday, Jimmy Rushing, and Dinah Washington, have avoided scat entirely.

== See also ==
- Asemic writing – Wordless open semantic form of writing
- Chopper (rap) – Rapping style within the hip hop genre
- Gibberish – Nonsensical speech or writing
- Glossolalia – Phenomenon in which people speak words apparently in languages unknown to them
- Idioglossia
- Lilting
- List of scat singers
- Literary nonsense – Genre of literature
- Mumble rap – Style of hip-hop
