= The Brothers & the Sisters =

Israeli pop-folk group

The Brothers & the Sisters האחים והאחיות
- Origin: Israel
- Genres: Pop, Folk
- Years active: 1971–1983, 2003–

The Brothers & the Sisters (Hebrew: האחים והאחיות, Ha'Achim VeHa'Achayot) was an Israeli vocal group active between 1971 and 1983, with reunions beginning in 2003. The ensemble consisted of four singers—two men and two women—though the lineup changed over time.

The group performed a range of genres, including zemer ivri, folk-pop, middle-of-the-road music, and children’s songs. Much of the band's discography was composed by their manager, Gideon Koren.

One of its prominent members was Susie Miller, an American-born singer who settled in Israel and became known for her appearances on Israeli educational television programs, where she played guitar and sang during English-language lessons.

In 1980, the group was selected to represent Israel in the Eurovision Song Contest with the song "Pizmon Chozer". However, Israel withdrew from the competition that year, and the group did not participate.

== Discography ==
- "Live at Tzavta - Im Zer Kotzim" - live concert DVD, NMC 2009
- "Zalman Has a Pair of Pants", Hed Artzi, 2009
- "The Best of the Brothers and the Sisters"—double CD, NMC 2008
- "Best Children's Songs", NMC 2006
- Love for Two (Ahavah shel shnei anashim), Skyton/Visart, 2005
- "Journey to Noteland" (with Shlomo Artzi), Visart, 2004
- "Children's Songs: Berale Tze Hachutza - Ha'Achim Veha'Achayot 1996
- "Beatles: Stories and Melodies to the Beatles Songs - Ha'Achim Veha'Achayot" 1996
- "Top Hits: Ha'Achim Veha'Achayot" 1994

תקליטים Record Albums:

תקליט "האחים והאחיות 1973-1974" - הד ארצי 1974

1975 CBS - תקליט "חופים - שירי נתן יונתן"

תקליט "אהבה של שני אנשים" - ישראדיסק 1977

תקליט "בכל מקום - שירי משוררים" - התקליט חיפה 1980

תקליט "במרחק שתי תקוות - שירי יהודה עמיחי" - הד ארצי 1982

תקליט "שירים עד כאן - עשר שנים" - התקליט חיפה 1982

תקליט "על ענפי שיטה - שירים שנשארים" - הד ארצי 1982

תקליטורים CDs:

תקליטור "אהבה של שני אנשים" - ויזארט 2005

תקליטור "האחים והאחיות- המבחר" - התקליט חיפה 1994

תקליטור "לחיות בתוך השיר" - התקליט חיפה 2005

תקליטור "אם זר קוצים" - סדרת "המיטב", NMC 2008

DVD:

תקליטור "אם זר קוצים" - הופעה חיה בצוותא - NMC 2009

שירי ילדים Children's Music:

תקליטים Record Albums:

תקליט "הספינה המזמרת" - התקליט חיפה 1974

תקליט "הטיול לארץ התוים" - ישראדיסק 1975

תקליט "היפיפיה והיחפן" - התקליט חיפה 1974

תקליט "ידידי מכיתה אלף" - התקליט חיפה 1976

תקליט "ספינת המנגינות האבודות" - התקליט 1976

תקליט "דמבו הפילון המעופף" - התקליט 1975

תקליט "החיפושיות" - התקליט חיפה 1977

תקליט "מיטב שירי הילדים" - סיביאס 1977

תקליט "חתולים בצמרת" - התקליט חיפה 1977

תקליט "שובי דובי" - 1977

תקליט "ברבא אבא" - פונוקול 1978

תקליט "זלמן יש לו מכנסיים" - הד ארצי 1979

תקליט "ד"ר דוליטל" - הד ארצי 1980

תקליט "בנלוקחבת" - הד ארצי 1982

"תקליט "חברי הדרקון אליוט

"תקליט "הרפתקאות ברנארד וביאנקה

"תקליט "שירי חג לילדים

"תקליט "29 שירים עליזים לילדים

תקליטורים Children's CDs:

תקליטור חדש] "זלמן יש לו מכנסיים" - הד ארצי 2009]

2006 NMC - תקליטור "מיטב שירי הילדים"

תקליטור "החיפושיות" - התקליט 2006

תקליטור "שובי דובי" - סקאיטון 2005

תקליטור "הטיול לארץ התוים" - ויזארט 2004

תקליטור "ברל'ה צא החוצה" - התקליט 1996

תקליטונים Records:

"תקליט "ספינת השלום

== See also ==
- The Mamas & the Papas
