= Lottery Fever =

- Family Guy episode
- Episode no.: Season 10; Episode 1
- Directed by: Greg Colton
- Written by: Andrew Goldberg
- Production code: 9ACX01
- Original air date: September 25, 2011

Guest appearances
- Randy Crenshaw as Eduard Khil; Judy Greer as Pregnant showgirl; Christine Lakin as Joyce Kinney; Chris O'Dowd as Butler; Tara Strong as Anna Paquin; Fred Tatasciore; Wendee Lee

Episode chronology
← Previous "It's a Trap!"	Next → "Seahorse Seashell Party"
- Family Guy season 10

"Lottery Fever" is the tenth season premiere of the American animated television series Family Guy. The 166th episode of the series overall, it originally aired on the Fox network in the United States on September 25, 2011. The episode follows the Griffins after they win the state lottery, and go on to spend the money with no regard. Peter becomes power hungry, and demands that Quagmire and Joe perform tasks for him when he invests in one of their projects. This ultimately causes the group to end their friendship, to the dismay of Peter's wife, Lois, who tells her husband that the money has changed him for the worse. After continually wasting the money on various expenditures, the family discovers that they have gone broke, and return to their lives as a lower middle class family. Peter also apologizes to Quagmire and Joe, repairing his broken friendships.

The episode was written by Andrew Goldberg and directed by Greg Colton. "Lottery Fever" received mixed reviews from television critics for its storyline and cultural references. According to Nielsen ratings, it was viewed in 7.69 million homes in its original airing. The episode featured guest performances by Randy Crenshaw, Judy Greer, Christine Lakin, Chris O'Dowd, Tara Strong, Wendee Lee, and Fred Tatasciore, along with several recurring guest voice actors for the series.

== Plot ==
During the show's theme song, one of the female dancers interrupts the theme song, and says that she is pregnant, and is then taken away by security.

In the episode itself, the Griffin family must begin living on a stricter budget. A local news story on the lottery influences Peter to take out a mortgage on the house and buy thousands of tickets in hopes that he will win and set the family on a better financial platform. After watching the results of the lottery that night, they spend three days searching for the lottery tickets and soon discover that they have won. The family are unable to decide how they should spend all the money, though Lois states that she does not want it to change their lifestyle. Defiant, Peter decides to begin living lavishly, and quits his job.

After Peter agrees to invest in Quagmire's projects and gives money to Joe for Bonnie's birthday, he demands that they perform random, often painful or humiliating tasks for him in order to pay him back. Joe brings the first season of True Blood to show Peter boob, only for Peter to be unimpressed with Anna Paquin. Peter tells Quagmire to take a huge bite out of a Popsicle, which leaves him in agony. After Peter humiliates Quagmire and Joe by making them perform a musical duet on "making whoopie" for his entertainment and then shooting them with a BB gun, causing Joe to get shot in the eye and Quagmire getting shot in the throat, they both finally get fed up with Peter's demands and end their friendship with him. Peter continues to spend the money with no regard, and Lois warns him that he is changing for the worse, along with the other family members. Peter tells her that they no longer have to worry about expenses, and presents her with a blood diamond, winning her over. When they go to a restaurant, Peter discovers his credit card got declined, and his money disappeared, and the family's home later gets repossessed due to Peter failing to pay off the mortgage. After buying more lottery tickets, winning again, and then blowing it again, the family is distraught over losing their fortune twice.

Peter returns to the local bar and apologizes to Joe and Quagmire, admitting that the money made him forget who his real friends are. Quagmire and Joe forgive him and Quagmire returns Peter's investment, allowing the family to pay off their mortgage and go back to living comfortably at their home in Quahog.

== Production and development ==
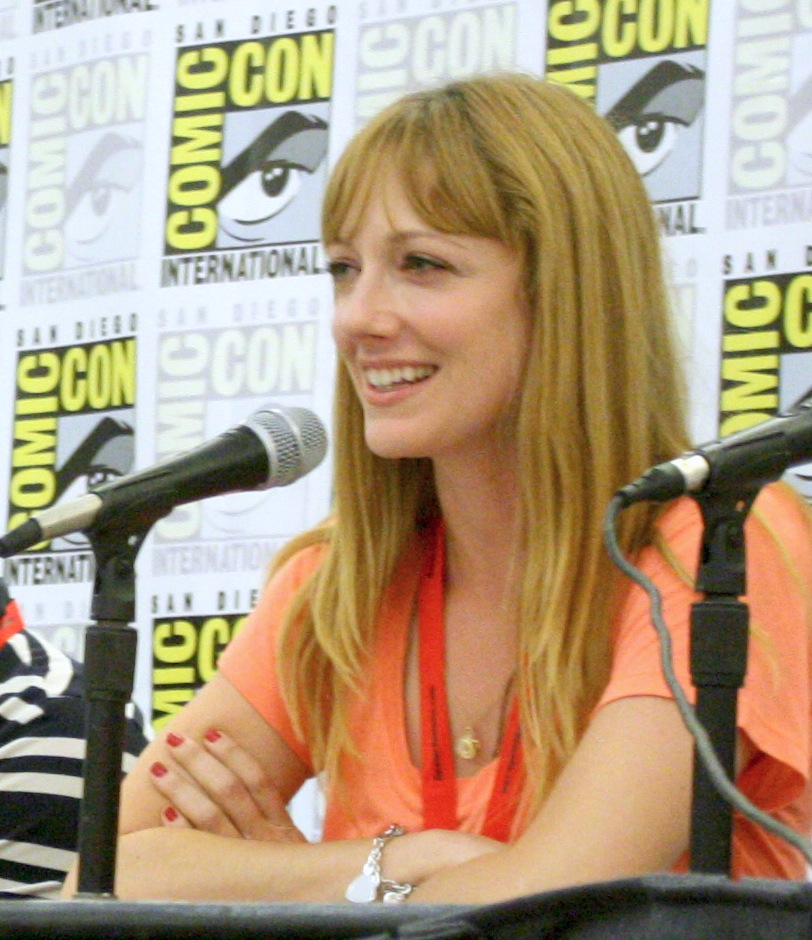
Judy Greer guest starred in the episode

The episode was first announced on July 27, 2011, during a "sweepstakes" hosted by 20th Century Fox. The sweepstakes reportedly would provide the winner with $3,000, as well as the announcement of the winner's name during the episode's premiere in the United States. It was directed by series regular Greg Colton, who had previously directed several of the Road to... episodes, including the Emmy Award winning episodes "Road to the Multiverse" and "Road to the North Pole". The episode was written by series regular Andrew Goldberg, who joined the show in its sixth season. Series regulars Peter Shin and James Purdum served as supervising directors, with Andrew Goldberg, Alex Carter, Spencer Porter, Anthony Blasucci, Mike Desilets and Deepak Sethi serving as staff writers for the episode. Composer Walter Murphy, who has worked on the series since its inception, returned to compose the music for "Lottery Fever". The episode first premiered at an advance screening in Chicago, Illinois at the Kerasotes Theatre.

In addition to the regular cast, voice actor Randy Crenshaw, actress Judy Greer, actress Christine Lakin, comedian Chris O'Dowd, voice actress Tara Strong and voice actor Fred Tatasciore guest starred in the episode. Recurring guest voice actors Alexandra Breckenridge, voice actor John G. Brennan, writer Danny Smith, writer Alec Sulkin, and writer John Viener made minor appearances. Recurring guest voice actor Adam West made another appearance in this episode.

== Cultural references ==
At the beginning of the episode, Peter, Brian and Chris are watching Star Trek II: The Wrath of Khan as edited for goats on TV; the live action scene involving Khan saying he's marooned for all eternity is shown, in which Kirk yells "Khan" as "BAA!". Peter forces Joe to watch True Blood. Peter jumping in a room full of gold coins is a reference to the animated series DuckTales. The bar scene in which the waiter Peter likes starts to sing, is a reference to the "Trolololol" internet meme featuring Eduard Khil.

=== Jenner reference ===
The beginning of the episode shows a cutaway gag of Peter performing on a USO Tour (presumably using Bob Hope's comedy routine as his own) to the United States Navy before introducing Caitlyn Jenner (then Bruce), (Note: Jenner changed her name due to gender transition in 2015.) who performs burlesque to the tune of The Stripper. While the reference at the time was to the fact that Jenner's then-wife Kris Jenner "wore the pants" in their marriage, in a bit of life imitating art, the clip would resurface in 2015 when reports surfaced that Jenner was transitioning to a trans woman following her divorce from Kris. It would also be referenced in the season 7 episode "We Love You, Conrad".

== Reception ==
"Lottery Fever" was broadcast on September 25, 2011, as a part of an animated television night on Fox, and was preceded by the season premiere of The Simpsons ("The Falcon and the D'ohman") and Family Guy creator Seth MacFarlane's spin-off series The Cleveland Show ("BFFs"). It was followed by MacFarlane's other series American Dad!. It was watched by 7.69 million viewers, according to Nielsen ratings, despite airing simultaneously with Desperate Housewives on ABC, The Good Wife on CBS and Sunday Night Football on NBC. The episode also acquired a 4.1/9 rating in the 18–49 demographic, beating all three shows, in addition to significantly edging out The Cleveland Show and American Dad! in total viewership. The episode's ratings decreased significantly from the previous season's premiere episode, "And Then There Were Fewer".

The episode received mixed reviews. Kevin McFarland of The A.V. Club graded the episode a C, stating "I would have less of a problem with the typically shallow excuse for a plot if there was more funny material, but even by Family Guy standards, there wasn’t a whole lot in this episode". Kate Moon of TV Fanatic gave a 3/5 rating. She disliked the parts where Peter "[was] acting like a douche to his friends", calling them "[not] interesting enough to watch for 23 minutes". She also stated the episode would have "vastly improved" if the plot was on Brian and Stewie.

The episode debuted in the United Kingdom (and was followed by "Seahorse Seashell Party") on 20 May 2012, with 1.55 million viewers. It was the sixth most watched episode on a single night on the BBC Three channel.
