= Gene Greene =

American singer (1877–1930)

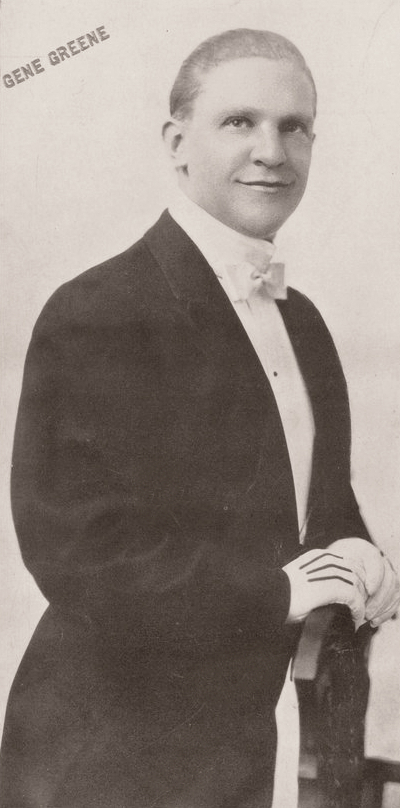

Background information
- Born: Eugene Delbert Greene; June 9, 1877
- Died: April 5, 1930 (aged 52) New York City
- Genre: Ragtime
- Occupation: Singer
- Years active: 1911–1930

Eugene Delbert Greene (June 9, 1877 – April 5, 1930) was an American vaudeville and ragtime singer. He was one of the first to use scat singing techniques.

== Career ==
Greene was born in Indiana. He worked with his wife, Blanche Werner, as Greene & Werner.

Between 1911 and 1917, he made five recordings of "King of the Bungaloos", which was his most popular song. Nicknamed "The Ragtime King", he employed scat singing techniques on this song. His other songs included "The Chinese Blues" and "Alexander's Got a Jazz Band Now". While on a tour of Europe in 1912, Blanche Werner died. Greene continued to perform, making about 64 recordings during 1912–13 before returning to the U.S. He retired to Grand Rapids, Michigan, and ran a restaurant. He tried to sing again in New York City but died of a heart attack backstage.

"King of the Bungaloos" appeared on Pop Music: The Early Years 1890–1950 as part of Sony's Soundtrack for a Century box set.

== See also ==
- List of ragtime composers
