= Gideon Koren =

Israeli-Canadian pharmacologist and folk musician (born 1947)

- גדעון קורן
- Born: 27 August 1947 (age 79); Tel Aviv, Israel
- Known for: Founder of the Motherisk Program, research controversies, and Israeli folk music composition
- Scientific career
- Fields: Pediatrics, clinical pharmacology, toxicology
- Workplaces: Hospital for Sick Children, University of Toronto
- Musical career
- Genre: Israeli folk music
- Occupations: Composer, musician

Gideon Koren, FACMT, FRCP(C) (Hebrew: גדעון קורן; born August 27, 1947) is an Israeli-Canadian pediatrician, clinical pharmacologist, toxicologist, and composer.

While in medical school in 1971, Koren founded The Brothers and The Sisters, a prominent Israeli musical group during the 1970s and early 1980s, for which he was the manager and principal composer.

Koren emigrated to Canada in 1982, where he worked as a physician at The Hospital for Sick Children in Toronto and served as a professor at the University of Toronto. In 1985, Koren established Motherisk, a clinical and research program at The Hospital for Sick Children that later closed following controversy. Several scientific publications by Koren have been subject to scrutiny over academic and research practices, resulting in the retraction of six articles and the issuance of editorial expressions of concern for others.

Koren relinquished his licence to practise medicine in Canada during an investigation into allegations of professional misconduct and incompetence related to his leadership of the Motherisk laboratory. The laboratory became the focus of a scandal that raised concern about the reliability of forensic toxicology testing used in approximately 16,000 child protection cases and six criminal cases. An independent review concluded that Koren and his staff lacked the qualifications required for the forensic testing performed.

In 2018, the Toronto Star published an investigative report identifying concerns in Koren's research, including inadequate peer review, undeclared conflicts of interest, and inaccuracies in methodology. This reporting contributed to further retractions of Koren's scientific publications. In November 2026, The Lancet retracted a widely cited 2006 study co-authored by Koren that had attributed an infant's death to codeine transmitted through breast milk. The journal cited findings of falsification through the omission of toxicological evidence, following an investigation by the Hospital for Sick Children.

== Early life and education ==
Koren was born in 1947 in Tel Aviv, then part of Mandatory Palestine, and was raised in the nearby town of Kiryat Ono. His father was the chief engineer of the Reading Power Station of the Israel Electric Corporation.

Koren received his Doctor of Medicine degree from the Sackler School of Medicine at Tel Aviv University in 1973. After mandatory military service in the Israel Defense Forces, he pursued postgraduate clinical studies in pediatrics and pediatric nephrology, as well as research training in pediatric toxicology, pharmacology, and membrane biology at The Hospital for Sick Children and the University of Toronto. He later joined the faculty of the University of Toronto and the staff of the Hospital for Sick Children, where he ultimately became a professor.

Koren subsequently held the endowed Ivey Chair in Molecular Toxicology at the Schulich School of Medicine at the University of Western Ontario, where he contributed to the establishment of a national program in human toxicology while continuing his work in Toronto.

== Music career ==
In 1971, while studying medicine at Tel Aviv University, Koren founded the Israeli musical group The Brothers & The Sisters, which became one of the notable Israeli groups of the 1970s and 1980s. The band performed many of Koren's compositions, including children's songs and musicals. In 1974, he collaborated with singer Shlomo Artzi on an album based on his grandmother Keri's story A Journey to Noteland. A stage musical adaptation of A Journey to Noteland premiered in Israel in 2008.

In 1992, Koren founded the Bear Theatre at The Hospital for Sick Children in Toronto. In 2005, The Brothers & The Sisters toured North America following the publication of a bilingual commemorative volume of the poetry of Natan Yonatan, accompanied by a CD of Koren's musical settings of the poems. The group continues to perform in Israel, often featuring Koren's compositions, many of which are set to works by Israeli poets.

== Medical career and controversies ==
Koren founded the Motherisk Program at the Hospital for Sick Children in 1985, which he directed until his retirement in 2015. Motherisk later closed following concerns about the reliability of its forensic toxicology testing, which had been used in thousands of child protection and criminal cases. An independent review concluded that the laboratory staff lacked the necessary expertise for forensic work.

=== Deferiprone controversy ===
In 1996, a dispute arose over the safety and effectiveness of deferiprone, a drug being tested as a treatment for iron overload in patients with thalassemia. Koren and Toronto hematologist Nancy Olivieri had been co-investigators in clinical trials sponsored by Apotex. Olivieri raised concerns about the drug's effectiveness and possible liver toxicity, while Koren disagreed with her interpretation of the findings.

Between October 1998 and May 1999, Koren wrote five anonymous letters criticizing Olivieri and her research. The letters were sent to a journalist, physicians at the Hospital for Sick Children and other recipients. Koren denied writing them during investigations by the hospital and the University of Toronto, but admitted responsibility in December 1999 after DNA evidence linked him to the correspondence.

Following the investigations, Koren was suspended from the hospital and resigned two leadership positions. A University of Toronto investigation also found that he had committed research misconduct by publishing data from the deferiprone trials without the consent or participation of other investigators. In 2003, the College of Physicians and Surgeons of Ontario found Koren guilty of professional misconduct and ordered that he be formally reprimanded and pay $2,500 toward the costs of the disciplinary proceedings. The disciplinary committee accepted that the research misconduct should not be characterized as fraudulent.

In 2019, the journal Therapeutic Drug Monitoring retracted Koren's 1999 paper, "An investigation into variability in the therapeutic response to deferiprone in patients with thalassemia major", citing the unauthorized use of collaborators' data and inappropriate authorship attribution. The paper had previously been corrected in 2004 to acknowledge funding from Apotex. Koren opposed the retraction and maintained that the paper's scientific findings were valid.

=== Scientific misconduct ===
In December 2018, the Toronto Star reported problems in more than 400 scientific papers coauthored by Koren, including inadequate peer review, undeclared conflicts of interest, and inaccuracies in methodology. This reporting led to retractions and editorial expressions of concern regarding several of his publications. In 2019, Koren threatened legal action against the editor of Therapeutic Drug Monitoring after one of his papers was retracted. In February 2019, he agreed to relinquish his licence to practice medicine in Ontario while under investigation by the CPSO for alleged professional misconduct and incompetence in relation to the Motherisk laboratory. He also agreed not to reapply for a medical licence in Ontario.

The Ontario College of Physicians and Surgeons also cited him for additional misconduct in research.

Several scientific publications by Koren have been subject to scrutiny over academic and research practices, resulting in multiple retractions, corrections and editorial expressions of concern.

In January 2026, an investigation by The New Yorker raised questions about a 2006 case report co-authored by Koren and Michael Rieder, published in The Lancet under the title "Pharmacogenetics of morphine poisoning in a breastfed neonate of a codeine-prescribed mother". The paper attributed the death of an Ontario infant in 2005 to morphine poisoning resulting from codeine taken by the child's breastfeeding mother. The study influenced international guidance concerning breastfeeding and the use of opioid painkillers after childbirth. In February 2026, The Lancet issued an expression of concern following allegations involving omitted toxicological evidence, authorship and research ethics.

In November 2026, The Lancet formally retracted the study following a research integrity investigation by the Hospital for Sick Children in Toronto. The investigation found that the published report had omitted material toxicological evidence, including measurements of codeine and acetaminophen in the infant's blood and the identification of codeine in the infant's stomach contents. The hospital determined that these omissions constituted falsification under its Responsible Conduct of Research Policy. According to the retraction notice, the omitted findings prevented readers from adequately assessing the study's conclusions. The journal also stated that concerns involving authorship and research ethics could not be fully investigated because meaningful participation by Koren was considered unlikely. The hospital declined to release further details of its investigation, citing confidentiality.

The retraction attracted renewed attention to the study's influence on medical practice. Toronto pharmacologist David Juurlink, a longtime critic of the research, argued that its conclusions had affected postpartum pain management and discouraged some women taking opioid painkillers from breastfeeding. Juurlink also criticized the length of time taken to retract the paper, attributing the delay to institutional failures and crediting investigative journalism with bringing the problems to public attention.

== Personal life ==
Following his resignation from Motherisk in 2015, Koren returned to Israel.

== Publications ==
Koren has published 15 medical books, among them:

- Retinoids in Clinical Practice: The Risk-Benefit Ratio (Medical Toxicology). New York: M. Dekker, 1993. (ISBN 0824787781)
- The Children of Neverland: The Silent Human Disaster. Toronto: Kid in Us, 1997. (ISBN 0968180108)
- The Complete Guide to Everyday Risks in Pregnancy & Breastfeeding: Answers to Your Questions About Morning Sickness, Medications, Herbs, Diseases, Chemical Exposures & More. Toronto: R. Rose, 2004. (ISBN 0-7788-0084-9)
- Medication Safety in Pregnancy and Breastfeeding. New York: McGraw-Hill, Health Professions Division, 2007. (ISBN 0071448284)
- Medication Safety in Pregnancy and Breastfeeding: The Evidence-Based, A to Z Clinician's Pocket Guide. New York: McGraw-Hill Medical, 2007. (ISBN 0071448276)

== See also ==
- List of scientific misconduct incidents
