= Motherisk =

Defunct laboratory in Ontario, Canada

Motherisk was a clinical and research program at The Hospital for Sick Children in Toronto, Ontario, Canada, established in 1985 as a teratogen information service to provide evidence-based safety information on exposures in pregnancy and lactation.

Motherisk had two helplines available providing information and guidance to those planning a pregnancy, pregnant or lactating, and to health care professionals:

1. The Motherisk General Helpline provided evidence-based information regarding the safety or risks to the pregnancy, fetus and/or infant from exposure to medications, natural products, chemicals, diseases, radiation, environmental agents and other exposures during pregnancy and breastfeeding.
2. The Motherisk Alcohol and Substance Use Helpline provided evidence-based information regarding the safety or risks to the pregnancy, fetus and/or infant from exposure to alcohol, nicotine, smoking cessation products, methadone, buprenorphine and recreational drugs such as marijuana, cocaine and ecstasy during pregnancy and breastfeeding.

Independent of the Helplines, a drug testing laboratory (Motherisk Drug Testing Laboratory (MDTL)) was operating from the early 1990s until April 2015, at which time the laboratory was closed.

== Awards ==
Gideon Koren and colleagues for the Motherisk team were recognized as one of the two highest-ranking winners of the 2011 CIHR/CMAJ competition for Top Achievements in Health Research. The CMAJ published their Essay for the 2011 award.

== Controversy ==
An independent review commissioned by the Ontario Ministry of the Attorney General concluded in 2015 that "hair-strand drug and alcohol testing used by the Motherisk Drug Testing Laboratory between 2005 and 2015 was inadequate and unreliable for use in child protection and criminal proceedings and that the Laboratory did not meet internationally recognized forensic standards." The US State of Colorado was one of the jurisdictions that in 1993 described the lab's results as "not competent evidence". The report called for further investigation of some of the 16,000 child protection cases where testing by Motherisk had been requested and sometimes used as evidence in child protection and criminal proceedings, citing "serious implications for the fairness of those proceedings".

In 2017, an investigation into Gideon Koren was commenced by the College of Physician and Surgeons in Ontario into whether he committed professional misconduct or was incompetent while he was in charge of the Motherisk Laboratory. As a result, Gideon Koren agreed to relinquish his license to practice medicine in Ontario in 2019.

== See also ==
- Gideon Koren, former Motherisk laboratory director who relinquished his licence to practice medicine in Ontario in the face of an investigation by the College of Physicians and Surgeons into whether he committed “professional misconduct or was incompetent” while he was in charge of the Motherisk laboratory.
- Charles Randal Smith, disgraced forensic pathologist, also in Ontario.
- Foster care, the system many children removed from their parents by Children's Aid were placed into through Motherisk.
