= Little Blue Light =

Soviet-Russian New Year variety show

The Little Blue Light (Russian: Голубой огонёк, romanized: Goluboy ogonyok) was a popular musical variety show aired on Soviet television since 1962 during various holidays. The name alludes to the light bluish glare of a black-and-white cathode ray tube TV screen as well as some traditional Russian expressions relating to friendly visits: заглянуть на огонек (zaglyanut na ogonyok) – "to drop in on a light", i. e. to visit someone after seeing a light in their window; посидеть у огонька (posidyet' u ogon'ka) – to have a sit by the fire.

The show featured popular artists and various prominent Soviet people: udarniks, Heroes of Socialist Labor, cosmonauts, actors, etc., as well as guests from the countries of the "socialist camp", who sat by the tables in a "TV cafeteria", singing songs, playing sketches, boasting and celebrating the holiday. The idea of the show was that they "dropped in on a light" to every Soviet family to share the festive table beyond the TV glass.

A separate item was the performance of comedians. The apogee of the comedy program has always been Arkady Raikin's numbers, comic duets were popular — Veronika Mavrikievna and Avdotya Nikitichna (Vadim Tonkov and Boris Vladimirov), Plug and Tarapunka (Yefim Berezin and Yuri Timoshenko), as well as Lev Mirov and Mark Novitsky.

The best-known was the New Year's Little Blue Light (Russian: Новогодний Голубой огонёк, romanized: Novogodny Goluboy ogonyok), aired on every New Year's Eve as a part of the late Soviet tradition: the Little Blue Light followed the New Year's speech by the General Secretary of the Communist Party with congratulations to the Soviet people followed by the Kremlin midnight chimes and the State Anthem of the Soviet Union, which was, in turn, preceded by the 1975 film comedy Irony of Fate.

Writer Andrey Khoroshevsky believed that the phenomenon of the "Blue Light" consisted in the fact that even the most famous guests in the program appeared to be ordinary people with problems and interests understandable to every viewer. In 2003, Mikhail Shvydkoy, Russian Minister of Culture, stated that ""The Blue Light" turned the Soviet Union into a large communal apartment — it united people at the screens."

The Little Blue Light was devised by film director Aleksey Gabrilovich, and the first show was aired on 6 April 1962 as a weekly Saturday broadcast. After some time it became a monthly show, and later it was only aired on major holidays.

During the decline of the Soviet Union, the "trademark" Little Blue Light began to gradually disappear from the screens and the New Year concert became a matter of experimenting. The last show of Little Blue Light was in fact a potpourri from older programs. After the dissolution of the Soviet Union, the program was revived in Russia after a ten-year hiatus in 1998 as a yearly special. Thoroughly following the format of its Soviet predecessor, it has become an element of Soviet nostalgia. The trademark "Little Blue Light" is now owned by Russia 1, the television network, where it is still seen immediately after President's address on the New Year midnight under the title "Голубой огонёк на Шаболовке" "Little Blue Light at Shabolovka" (Here "Shabolovka" refers to the Shabolovka TV Center.)

In the 1970s the typical New Year's LBL episode lasted an hour and a half, since the late 1980s up till today the telecast begins at 12:05 am MST and lasts for three hours.
