= Valery Obodzinsky =

Russian singer (1942–1997)

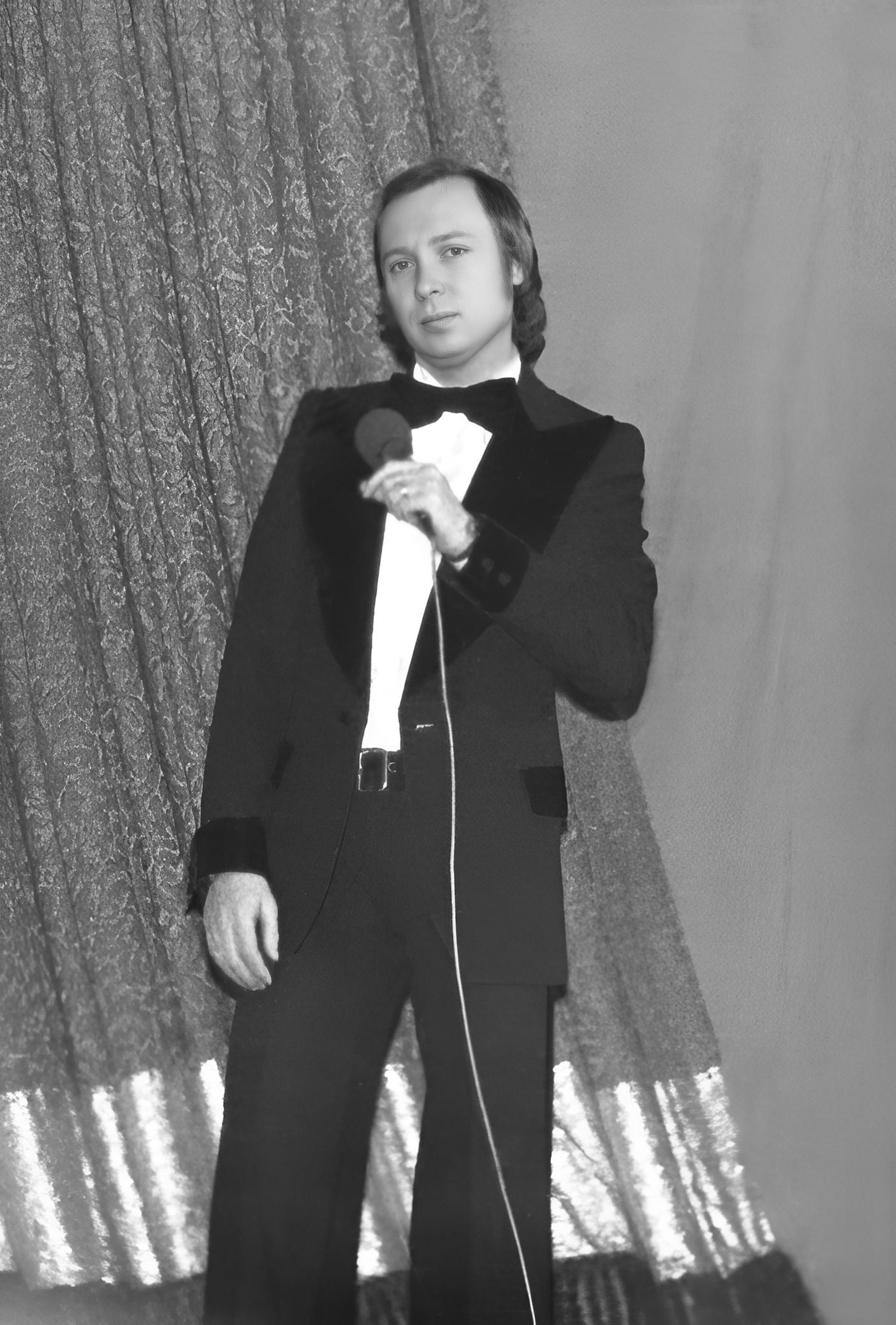
1976

Valery Vladimirovich Obodzinsky (Russian: Вале́рий Влади́мирович Ободзи́нский; 24 January 1942 – 26 April 1997) was a Soviet and Russian singer (tenor), a holder of the title of Meritorious Artist Mari Autonomous Soviet Socialist Republic (1973). He gained wide popularity all over the Soviet Union when in 1964 Oleg Lundstrem invited the popular provincial singer to work as a soloist with his Moscow-based orchestra. A year and a half later, having recorded a number of big hits, Obodzinsky decided to split and continue his career independently. In the 1970s, in part because he only performed lyrical songs and his repertoire was therefore limited, he started experiencing an artistic crisis. He periodically fell into depression and eventually abandoned the stage for over 10 years.
