= Audie Award for Mystery =

American literary award

The Audie Award for Mystery is one of the Audie Awards presented annually by the Audio Publishers Association (APA). It awards excellence in narration, production, and content for a mystery audiobook released in a given year. It has been awarded since 1997.

== Winners and finalists ==
=== 1990s ===
Year	Title	Author(s)	Narrator(s)	Publisher	Result	Ref.
1997 2nd	The Mysterious Affair at Styles (1920)	Agatha Christie	David Suchet	The Audio Partners Publishing Corp.	Winner	
1997 2nd	Cadillac Jukebox (1996)	James Lee Burke	Will Patton	Simon & Schuster Audio	Finalist	
1997 2nd	"M" Is for Malice (1996)	Sue Grafton	Judy Kaye	Random House Audio	Finalist	
1998 3rd	Vintage Crime Stories (1859–1982)	Charles Dickens, Ruth Rendell, Margery Allingham, Graham Greene, E. W. Hornung, and Frances Hegarty	Patrick Malahide	Tangled Web Audio	Winner	
1998 3rd	Cimarron Rose (1998)	James Lee Burke	Will Patton	Simon & Schuster Audio	Finalist	
1998 3rd	Red Harvest (1929)	Dashiell Hammett	William Dufris	Isis Publishing	Finalist	
1999 4th	The Third Man (1949)	Graham Greene	Martin Jarvis	The Audio Partners Publidhing	Winner	
1999 4th	Black Coffee (1930)	Agatha Christie (adapted by Charles Osborne)	Alexandra Thomas	HighBridge Audio	Finalist	
1999 4th	The Job (1998)	Douglas Kennedy	John Slattery	Simon & Schuster Audio	Finalist	

=== 2000s ===
Year	Title	Narrator	Narrator(s)	Publisher	Result	Ref.
2000 5th	The Breaker (1998)	Minette Walters	Robert Powell	Chivers North America	Winner	
2000 5th	"O" Is for Outlaw (1999)	Sue Grafton	Kevin Hearne	Random House Audio	Finalist	
2000 5th	Prayers for Rain (1999)	Dennis Lehane	Thomas J. S. Brown	Brilliance Audio	Finalist	
2001 6th	The Naked Detective (2000)	Laurence Shames	Ron McLarty	Recorded Books	Winner	
2001 6th	Hugger Mugger (2000)	Robert B. Parker	Joe Mantegna	Bantam Doubleday Dell Audio	Finalist	
2001 6th	Moment of Truth (2000)	Lisa Scottoline	Barbara Rosenblat	Recorded Books	Finalist	
2002 7th	Tell No One (2001)	Harlan Coben	Steven Weber	Random House Audio	Winner	
2002 7th	The Blue Nowhere (2001)	Jeffery Deaver	William Dufris	Chivers North America	Finalist	
2002 7th	The Vendetta Defense (2001)	Lisa Scottoline	Barbara Rosenblat	Recorded Books	Finalist	
2003 8th	Jolie Blon's Bounce (2002)	James Lee Burke	Will Patton	Simon & Schuster Audio	Winner	
2003 8th	The Diviner's Son (2002)	Gary Crew	Michael Veitch	Bolinda Audio	Finalist	
2003 8th	"Q" Is for Quarry (2002)	Sue Grafton	Judy Kaye	Random House Audio	Finalist	
2003 8th	Rumpole's Return (1980)	John Mortimer	Robert Hardy	BBC Audiobooks America	Finalist	
2003 8th	Tishomingo Blues (2002)	Elmore Leonard	Paul Rudd	HarperAudio	Finalist	
2004 9th	Lost Light (2003)	Michael Connelly	Len Cariou	Time Warner AudioBooks	Winner	
2004 9th	A Fine Dark Line (2002)	Joe R. Lansdale	Dick Hill	Brilliance Audio	Finalist	
2004 9th	Bangkok 8 (2004)	John Burdett	B. D. Wong	Random House Audio	Finalist	
2004 9th	Fear Itself (2003)	Walter Mosley	Don Cheadle	Time Warner AudioBooks	Finalist	
2004 9th	The Last Detective (2003)	Robert Crais	James Daniels	Brilliance Audio	Finalist	
2005 10th	Twisted (2003)	Jeffery Deaver	Boyd Gaines, Michele Pawk, and Fredrick Weller	Simon & Schuster Audio	Winner	
2005 10th	Brimstone (2004)	Douglas Preston and Lincoln Child	René Auberjonois	Time Warner AudioBooks	Finalist	
2005 10th	Double Homicide (2005)	Jonathan Kellerman and Faye Kellerman	John Rubinstein and Lou Diamond Phillips	Time Warner AudioBooks	Finalist	
2005 10th	Hark! (2004)	Ed McBain	Ron McLarty	Simon & Schuster Audio	Finalist	
2005 10th	The Man in My Basement (2004)	Walter Mosley	Ernie Hudson	Time Warner AudioBooks	Finalist	
2006 11th	The Serpent on the Crown (2005)	Elizabeth Peters	Barbara Peters	HarperAudio	Winner	
2006 11th	Away with the Fairies (2001)	Kerry Greenwood	Stephanie Daniel	Bolinda Audio	Finalist	
2006 11th	Hidden River (2005)	Adrian McKinty	Gerard Doyle	Blacksone Audio	Finalist	
2006 11th	The Hot Kid (2005)	Elmore Leonard	Arliss Howard	HarperAudio	Finalist	
2006 11th	One Dangerous Lady (2005)	Jane Stanton Hitchcock	Barbara Rosenblat	Blackstone Audio	Finalist	
2007 12th	Echo Park (2006)	Michael Connelly	Len Cariou	Hachette Audio	Winner	
2007 12th	A Field of Darkness (2006)	Cornelia Read	Hilary Huber	Blackstone Audio	Finalist	
2007 12th	Dark Tort (2007)	Diane Mott Davidson	Elizabeth Marvel	HarperAudio	Finalist	
2007 12th	Dead Center (2006)	David Rosenfelt	Grover Gardner	Listen & Live Audio	Finalist	
2007 12th	Definitely Dead (2006)	Charlaine Harris	Johanna Parker	Recorded Books	Finalist	
2007 12th	The Crimes of Jordan Wise (2006)	Bill Pronzini	Richard Ferrone	BBC Audiobooks America	Finalist	
2008 13th	The Tin Roof Blowdown (2007)	James Lee Burke	Will Patton	Simon & Schuster Audio	Winner	
2008 13th	A Fatal Grace (2007)	Louise Penny	Ralph Cosham	Blackstone Audio	Finalist	
2008 13th	Hollywood Station (2006)	Joseph Wambaugh	Adam Grupper	Hachette Audio	Finalist	
2008 13th	Thunder Bay (2007)	William Kent Krueger	Buck Schirmer	Brilliance Audio	Finalist	
2008 13th	Up in Honey's Room (2007)	Elmore Leonard	Arliss Howard	HarperAudio	Finalist	
2009 14th	The Voice of the Violin (1997)	Andrea Camilleri (trans. Stephen Sartarelli)	Grover Gardner	Blackstone Audio	Winner	
2009 14th	A Killing Frost (2008)	R. D. Wingfield	Stephen Thorne	Ulverscroft Group	Finalist	
2009 14th	Cross (2006)	Ken Bruen	Gerry O'Brien	Ulverscroft Group	Finalist	
2009 14th	Swan Peak (2008)	James Lee Burke	Will Patton	Simon & Schuster Audio	Finalist	
2009 14th	The Silver Swan (2007)	Benjamin Black	Timothy Dalton	Macmillan Audio	Finalist	

=== 2010s ===
Year	Title	Author(s)	Narrator(s)	Publisher	Result	Ref.
2010 15th	Devil in a Blue Dress (1990)	Walter Mosley	Michael Boatman	Audible	Winner	
2010 15th	Black Money (1966)	Ross Macdonald	Grover Gardner	Blackstone Audio	Finalist	
2010 15th	The Dying Breed (2008)	Declan Hughes	Stanley Townsend	Isis Publishing	Finalist	
2010 15th	Revelation (2008)	C. J. Sansom	Steven Crossley	Recorded Books	Finalist	
2010 15th	The Complete Stories of Sherlock Holmes, Volume I (1887–1927)	Arthur Conan Doyle	Charlton Griffin	Audio Connoisseur	Finalist	
2011 16th	The Reversal (2010)	Michael Connelly	Peter Giles	Hachette Audio	Winner	
2011 16th	Her Royal Spyness (2008)	Rhys Bowen	Katherine Kellgren	Audible	Finalist	
2011 16th	This Body of Death (2010)	Elizabeth George	John Lee	HarperAudio	Finalist	
2011 16th	Dog Tags (2010)	David Rosenfelt	Grover Gardner	Listen & Live Audio	Finalist	
2011 16th	Our Kind of Traitor (2010)	John le Carré	Robin Sachs	Penguin Audio	Finalist	
2011 16th	The Dead Room (2009)	Chris Mooney	Regina Reagan	Isis Publishing	Finalist	
2012 17th	Feast Day of Fools (2011)	James Lee Burke	Will Patton	Simon & Schuster Audio	Winner	
2012 17th	Naughty in Nice (2011)	Rhys Bowen	Katherine Kellgren	Audible	Finalist	
2012 17th	One Dog Night (2011)	David Rosenfelt	Grover Gardner	Listen & Live Audio	Finalist	
2012 17th	Return to Marshall's Bayou (2010)	S. H. Baker	Full cast	Siren Audio Studios	Finalist	
2012 17th	Rogue Island (2010)	Bruce DeSilva	Jeff Woodman	Audible	Finalist	
2013 18th	The Beautiful Mystery (2012)	Louise Penny	Ralph Cosham	Macmillan Audio	Winner	
2013 18th	And When She Was Good (2012)	Laura Lippman	Linda Emond	HarperAudio	Finalist	
2013 18th	The Good Thief's Guide to Vegas (2010)	Chris Ewan	Simon Vance	AudioGo	Finalist	
2013 18th	Hush Money (2012)	Chuck Greaves	Dan Butler	AudioGo	Finalist	
2013 18th	The Nightmare (2010)	Lars Kepler	Mark Bramhall	Macmillan Audio	Finalist	
2014 19th	Unleashed (2013)	David Rosenfelt	Grover Gardner	Listen & Live Audio	Winner	
2014 19th	Death and the Lit Chick (2009)	G. M. Malliet	Davina Porter	Dreamscape	Finalist	
2014 19th	The Enemy of My Enemy (2011)	Richard Bard	R. C. Bray	Richard Bard	Finalist	
2014 19th	Heirs and Graces (2013)	Rhys Bowen	Katherine Kellgren	Audible	Finalist	
2014 19th	He's Gone (2013)	Deb Caletti	Cassandra Campbell	Tantor Audio	Finalist	
2014 19th	Rage Against the Dying (2012)	Becky Masterman	Judy Kaye	Macmillan Audio	Finalist	
2015 20th	The Silkworm (2014)	Robert Galbraith	Robert Glenister	Hachette Audio	Winner	
2015 20th	The Dead Will Tell (2014)	Linda Castillo	Kathleen McInerney	Macmillan Audio	Finalist	
2015 20th	Hounded (2014)	David Rosenfelt	Grover Gardner	Listen & Live Audio	Finalist	
2015 20th	Malice (2014)	Keigo Higashino	Jeff Woodman	Macmillan Audio	Finalist	
2015 20th	Missing You (2014)	Harlan Coben	January LaVoy	Brilliance Audio	Finalist	
2015 20th	Providence Rag (2014)	Bruce DeSilva	Jeff Woodman	Audible	Finalist	
2016	Career of Evil (2015)	Robert Galbraith	Robert Glenister	Hachette Audio	Winner	
2016	All the Old Knives (2015)	Olen Steinhauer	Ari Fliakos and Juliana Francis Kelly	Macmillan Audio	Finalist	
2016	Corrupted (2013)	Lisa Scottoline	Kate Burton	Macmillan Audio	Finalist	
2016	Gun Street Girl (2015)	Adrian McKinty	Gerard Doyle	Blackstone Audio	Finalist	
2016	Malice at the Palace (2015)	Rhys Bowen	Katherine Kellgren	Audible	Finalist	
2016	The Nature of the Beast (2015)	Louise Penny	Robert Bathurst	Macmillan Audio	Finalist	
2017 22nd	The Crossing (2015)	Michael Connelly	Titus Welliver	Hachette Audio	Winner	
2017 22nd	Crimson Shore (2015)	Douglas Preston and Lincoln Child	René Auberjonois	Hachette Audio	Finalist	
2017 22nd	A Great Reckoning (2016)	Louise Penny	Robert Bathurst	Macmillan Audio	Finalist	
2017 22nd	The Heavens May Fall (2016)	Allen Eskens	R. C. Bray, David Colacci, and Amy McFadden	Tantor Audio	Finalist	
2017 22nd	IQ (2016)	Joe Ide	Sullivan Jones	Hachette Audio	Finalist	
2018 23rd	The Girl Who Takes an Eye for an Eye (2017)	David Lagercrantz	Simon Vance	Random House Audio	Winner	
2018 23rd	Glass Houses (2017)	Louise Penny	Robert Bathurst	Macmillan Audio	Finalist	
2018 23rd	Magpie Murders (2016)	Anthony Horowitz	Samantha Bond	HarperAudio	Finalist	
2018 23rd	On Her Majesty's Frightfully Secret Service (2017)	Rhys Bowen	Katherine Kellgren	Audible	Finalist	
2018 23rd	Telling Tales (2005)	Ann Cleeves	Julia Franklin	Macmillan Audio	Finalist	
2019 24th	The Punishment She Deserves (2018)	Elizabeth George	Simon Vance	Penguin Random House Audio	Winner	
2019 24th	Lethal White (2018)	Robert Galbraith	Robert Glenister	Hachette Audio	Finalist	
2019 24th	The Mystery of Three Quarters (2018)	Sophie Hannah	Julian Rhind-Tutt	HarperAudio	Finalist	
2019 24th	The Tuscan Child (2018)	Rhys Bowen	Jonathan Keeble and Katy Sobey	Audible	Finalist	
2019 24th	Wild Fire (2018)	Ann Cleeves	Kenny Blyth	Macmillan Audio	Finalist	

=== 2020s ===
Year	Title	Author(s)	Narrator(s)	Publisher	Result	Ref.
2020 25th	The Chestnut Man (2018)	Søren Sveistrup	Peter Noble	HarperAudio	Winner	
2020 25th	Along Came a Spider: 25th Anniversary Edition (1993)	James Patterson	Taye Diggs	Hachette Audio	Finalist	
2020 25th	The Boy (2018)	Tami Hoag	Hillary Huber	Brilliance Audio	Finalist	
2020 25th	The Lost Man (2019)	Jane Harper	Stephen Shanahan	Macmillan Audio	Finalist	
2020 25th	The New Iberia Blues (2019)	James Lee Burke	Will Patton	Simon & Schuster Audio	Finalist	
2021 26th	Fair Warning (2020)	Michael Connelly	Peter Giles and Zach Villa	Hachette Audio	Winner	
2021 26th	A Bad Day for Sunshine (2020)	Darynda Jones	Lorelei King	Macmillan Audio	Finalist	
2021 26th	Confessions on the 7:45 (2020)	Lisa Unger	Vivienne Leheny	HarperAudio	Finalist	
2021 26th	The Guest List (2020)	Lucy Foley	Chloe Massey, Olivia Dowd, Sarah Ovens, Rich Keeble, Aoife McMahon, and Jot Davies	HarperAudio	Finalist	
2021 26th	Trouble Is What I Do (2020)	Walter Mosley	Dion Graham	Hachette Audio	Finalist	
2022 27th	Later	Stephen King	Seth Numrich	Simon & Schuster Audio	Winner	
2022 27th	The Bucket List	Peter Mohlin and Peter Nystrom	Dion Graham	Recorded Books	Finalist	
2022 27th	Murder in Old Bombay	Nev March	Vikas Adam	Macmillan Audio	Finalist	
2022 27th	The Man in the Brown Suit	Agatha Christie	Gabrielle de Cuir with John Lee	Blackstone Publishing and Skyboat Media	Finalist	
2022 27th	The Midnight Man	Caroline Mitchell	Emma Gregory and Elliot Fitzpatrick	Embla Books	Finalist	
2023 28th	The Heron	Don Winslow	Ed Harris	Audible Originals	Winner	
2023 28th	The Bangalore Detectives Club	Harini Nagendra	Soneela Nankani	Blackstone Audio	Finalist	
2023 28th	The Maid	Nita Prose	Lauren Ambrose	Penguin Random House Audio	Finalist	
2023 28th	The Murder of Mr. Wickham	Claudia Gray	Billie Fulford-Brown	Penguin Random House Audio	Finalist	
2023 28th	Suspect	Scott Turow	Helen Laser	Hachette Audio	Finalist	
2024 29th	Vera Wong's Unsolicited Advice for Murderers	Jesse Q. Sutanto	Eunice Wong	Penguin Random House Audio	Winner	
2024 29th	The Golden Gate	Amy Chua	Robb Moreira, Tim Campbell, and Suzanne Toren	Macmillan Audio	Finalist	
2024 29th	A Line in the Sand	Kevin Powers	Christine Lakin	Hachette Audio	Finalist	
2024 29th	Murder Your Employer	Rupert Holmes	Neil Patrick Harris and Simon Vance	Simon & Schuster Audio	Finalist	
2024 29th	A World of Curiosities (2022)	Louise Penny	Robert Bathurst	Macmillan Audio	Finalist	
2025 30th	Listen for the Lie	Amy Tintera	Will Damron and January LaVoy	Macmillan Audio	Winner	
2025 30th	The Midnight Feast	Lucy Foley	Joe Eyre, Sarah Slimani, Roly Botha, Laurence Dobiesz, and Tuppence Middleton	HarperCollins Publishers	Finalist	
2025 30th	Rough Pages	Lev A. C. Rosen	Vikas Adam	Macmillan Audio	Finalist	
2025 30th	Still See You Everywhere	Lisa Gardner	Hillary Huber	Hachette Audio	Finalist	
2025 30th	This Is Why We Lied	Karin Slaughter	Kathleen Early	HarperCollins Publishers	Finalist	
2026 31st	Gone Before Goodbye	Reese Witherspoon and Harlan Coben	Reese Witherspoon, Chris Pine, Kiff VandenHeuvel, Suehyla El-Attar Young, Peter Ganim, Saskia Maarleveld, and James Fouhey	Hachette Audio	Winner	
2026 31st	Gray Dawn	Walter Mosley	Michael Boatman and Walter Mosley	Hachette Audio	Finalist	
2026 31st	The Queens of Crime	Marie Benedict	Bessie Carter	Macmillan Audio	Finalist	
2026 31st	Secret Sister	Sarah A. Denzil	Jessica Gunning, Sacha Dhawan, Joanne Froggatt, Nathaniel Curtis, and Hopi Grace	Audible Originals	Finalist	
2026 31st	Vera Wong's Guide to Snooping (on a Dead Man)	Jesse Q. Sutanto	Eunice Wong	Penguin Random House Audio	Finalist	
