= Stan of Arabia =

"Stan of Arabia" may refer to two episodes from the American animated comedy series American Dad!:

- "Stan of Arabia: Part 1", fifth episode of the second season that aired November 6, 2005
- "Stan of Arabia: Part 2", sixth episode of the second season that aired November 13, 2005
