= Jeff Woodman =

Audiobook narrator

Jeff Woodman is a narrator of audiobooks. He has won twenty Earphone Awards and one Audie Award.

== Early life ==
Woodman was raised in New England. He graduated from the State University of New York at Purchase Conservatory Theater Program.

== Awards and honors ==
=== Awards ===
Year	Title	Author	Award	Result	Ref.
1993	I Am the Cheese (1977)	Robert Cormier	Earphone Award	Winner	
1993	Who Was That Masked Man Anyway? (1992)	Avi	Earphone Award	Winner	
1994	My Side of the Mountain (1958)	Jean Craighead George	Earphone Award	Winner	
1997	The Friends (1992)	Kazumi Yumoto	Earphone Award	Winner	
1999	A Patchwork Planet (1998)	Anne Tyler	Earphone Award	Winner	
2001	The Hindenburg Murders (2000)	Max Allan Collins	Earphone Award	Winner	
2002	The Best Business Stories of the Year (2002)	Andrew Leckey and Ken Auletta (Eds.)	Earphone Award	Winner	
2003	Life of Pi (2001)	Yann Martel	Earphone Award	Winner	
2003	Masquerade (1998)	Walter Satterthwait	Earphone Award	Winner	
2003	The Curious Incident of the Dog in the Night-Time (2003)	Mark Haddon	Earphone Award	Winner	
2003	Lord John and the Private Matter (2003)	Diana Gabaldon	Earphone Award	Winner	
2003	The Venetian Affair (2003)	Andrea di Robilant	Earphone Award	Winner	
2005	The Ninth Life of Louis Drax (2004)	Liz Jensen	Earphone Award	Winner	
2005	Private Peaceful (2003)	Michael Morpurgo	Earphone Award	Winner	
2006	Extremely Loud and Incredibly Close (2005)	Jonathan Safran Foer	Audie Award for Multi-Voiced Performance	Finalist	
2006	Facts Behind the Helsinki Roccamatios	Yann Martel	Audie Award for Short Stories or Collections	Finalist	
2006	The Stolen Child	Keith Donohue	Listen-Up Award for Science Fiction/Fantasy	Winner	
2007	The Air We Breathe (2007)	Andrea Barrett	Earphone Award	Winner	
2007	The Invention of Hugo Cabret (2007)	Brian Selznick	Earphone Award	Winner	
2007	The Invention of Hugo Cabret (2007)	Brian Selznick	Listen-Up Award for Children's	Winner	
2007	Looking for Alaska (2005)	John Green	Audie Award for Young Adult Title	Finalist	
2007	The Stolen Child	Keith Donohue	Audie Award for Science Fiction	Winner	
2008	The Invention of Hugo Cabret (2007)	Brian Selznick	Audie Award for Audiobook of the Year	Finalist	
2008	The Invention of Hugo Cabret (2007)	Brian Selznick	Audie Award for Achievement in Production	Finalist	
2008	The Little Book (2008)	Selden Edwards	Earphone Award	Winner	
2010	The Transformation of Bartholomew Fortuno (2010)	Ellen Bryson	Earphone Award	Winner	
2012	The Revised Fundamentals of Caregiving (2012)	Jonathan Evison	Earphone Award	Winner	
2012	Rogue Island	Bruce DeSilva	Audie Award for Mystery	Finalist	
2014	The End of Nature (1989)	Bill McKibben	Audie Award for Nonfiction	Finalist	
2015	A Scourge of Vipers (2015)	Bruce DeSilva	Earphone Award	Winner	
2015	Malice	Keigo Higashino	Audie Award for Mystery	Finalist	
2015	Providence Rag	Bruce DeSilva	Audie Award for Mystery	Finalist	

=== "Best of" lists ===
Reedsy included Jeff Woodman's narration of Daniel Keyes's Flowers for Algernon (1959) in their list of the top 30 science fiction audiobooks.

Year	Title	Honor	Ref.
2003	Life of Pi (2001) by Yann Martel	AudioFile Best of Fiction	
2007	The Invention of Hugo Cabret (2007) by Brian Selznick	AudioFile Best of 2007 Children	
2008	The Little Book (2008) by Selden Edwards	AudioFile Best of Historical Fiction	
2008	The Air We Breathe (2007) by Andrea Barrett	AudioFile Best of Historical Fiction	

== Personal life ==
As of 2010, Woodman was living in New York City.
