= Lincoln Lover =

- American Dad! episode
- Episode no.: Season 3 Episode 4
- Directed by: Brent Woods
- Written by: Rick Wiener; Kenny Schwartz; Nahnatchka Khan
- Production code: 2AJN11
- Original air date: November 5, 2006

Guest appearances
- Tom Hollander as Performance-Artist Lincoln/Waiter; Peter Paige as Jason; Scott Lowell as Brett; Wilson Cruz as Fan/Log Cabin Chorus Member/Hot Andrew; Stark Sands as Conservative Republican/Tino/Conservative No. 1; Suzanne Cryer as Babette

Episode chronology
← Previous "Failure is Not a Factory-Installed Option"	Next → "Dungeons and Wagons"
- American Dad! season 3

"Lincoln Lover" is the fourth episode of the third season of the American animated television series American Dad!. It was first broadcast on Fox in the United States on November 5, 2006, and is written by Rick Wiener, Kenny Schwartz and Nahnatchka Khan and directed by Brent Woods.

In the episode, Stan wants to speak at the Republican National Convention, but the only GOP group that wants him to speak is the gay contingent.

== Plot ==
Stan is not selected by his local chapter of the Conservative Republicans to speak at the Republican National Convention. After watching a pretentious surrealist play about Abraham Lincoln, he decides to write and perform his own play about the first Republican president, to return to the original values of the Republican party. Stan's play, a one-man show entitled Lincoln Lover, depicts a very close relationship between Lincoln and his most trusted guard, Captain David Derickson. The play becomes extremely successful as many gay men come to watch, though Stan (who wrote the play based on Derickson's notes) apparently does not notice the homosexual undertones of his play. The Log Cabin Republicans invite him to speak at the convention; however, it is not until during the LCR party that Stan realizes its members are gay. He is won over by an elaborate musical number ("We're Red and We're Gay") and begins acting more and more like a stereotypical homosexual male.

Greg, who is gay and lives across the road from Stan, is a member of the LCR. Terry, his partner, a Democrat, is not. This causes them to break up. Steve, who has been deeply indoctrinated by Stan in the belief that all gays are evil, tries to save Stan, and reveals to the LCR Stan's previous anti-gay activities (such as participating in and funding the "7th Annual Anti-Gay Palooza" with Pat Robertson). Stan is uninvited from an LCR cruise and not allowed to speak on their behalf at the RNC because he is perceived as homophobic, so he decides to sleep with a man to show "the LCR...I'm one of them." He goes on a date with Terry (who is mad at Greg and has declared "open season"), but fails to become aroused when they reach the bedroom. Terry tells Stan that homosexuality is not a choice, contrary to Stan's belief.

At the RNC, when the Conservative Republicans' speaker is kicked out for her second car being a Toyota Prius, Stan speaks for the Republicans. When he sees the Log Cabin members not being let in, Stan states in his speech, with much surprise to the convention, that they are not gay by choice, but nevertheless are Republicans by choice and that all Republicans should band together to direct their hatred from the gays to the Democrats, who choose to be that way. Afterwards, the Conservative Republicans accept the LCR.

== Reception ==
The episode was nominated for Outstanding Individual Episode by the Gay & Lesbian Alliance Against Defamation at the 18th GLAAD Media Awards. The award is meant to recognize and honor various branches of the media for their outstanding representations of the lesbian, gay, bisexual and transgender (LGBT) community and issues.

The episode was watched by a total of 7.71 million people; this made it the third most-watched show on Animation Domination that night, losing to Family Guy and The Simpsons, which had 10.46 million viewers.
