= After School Special (disambiguation) =

The term "after school special" refers to a genre of American television programs that are intended to be viewed by adolescents after they returned home from school.

After School Special may also refer to:

- ABC Afterschool Special, the 1972–1997 American television anthology series for children and teenagers
- "After School Special", a song by Detroit Grand Pubahs and Miss Kittin from the album Funk All Y'all
- "After School Special" (Supernatural), an episode of the television series Supernatural
- "After School Special" (The Vampire Diaries), an episode of the television series The Vampire Diaries
- "The American Dad After School Special", an episode of the Fox animated television series American Dad!
- National Lampoon's Barely Legal, a 2003 film that is also known as After School Special
- "After School Special", a song by Mr. Bungle from the album Disco Volante
