= American Dad! season 3 =

American Dad!
- Season 3
- DVD cover for Volume 3, which includes episodes 10-19
- Starring: Seth MacFarlane; Wendy Schaal; Scott Grimes; Rachael MacFarlane; Dee Bradley Baker
- No. of episodes: 19

Release
- Original network: Fox
- Original release: September 10, 2006 – May 20, 2007

Season chronology
- ← Previous; Season 2 Next → Season 4

The third season of American Dad! first aired on the Fox Network in nineteen episodes from September 10, 2006, to May 20, 2007, before being included in two DVD box sets and in syndication. The series focuses on the eccentric upper middle class Smith family in a fictionalized version of Langley, Virginia and their six housemates: Father, husband, CIA agent, and Republican, Stan; his wife and housewife, Francine; their liberal, hippie, college-aged daughter, Hayley; their dorky high-school-aged son, Steve; the family's unusual goldfish, Klaus; and flamboyant, master of disguise alien, Roger.

The season received mixed reviews from critics, who praised the series’ ability to "(avoid) being a repeat of the same concepts and techniques (of Family Guy)". Criticism of the season mostly went to the series’ refrain from political humor, and becoming "just another TV comedy."

Season three contains some of the series' most acclaimed episodes, including "The American Dad After School Special" and "Lincoln Lover". The third season was nominated for an Annie Award at the 34th Annie Awards for writing. The season also received a GLAAD Media Award nomination for Outstanding Individual Episode.

The Volume Two DVD Box Set was released in Region 1 on May 15, 2007, Region 2 on May 28, 2007, and Region 4 on May 21, 2007. The first nine episodes of the season are included in the volume. The remaining ten episodes of the season were included in the Volume 3 DVD box set, which released in Region 1 on April 15, 2008, Region 2 on May 12, 2008, and Region 4 on May 14, 2008.

== Episodes ==
No. overall	No. in season	Title	Directed by	Written by	Original release date	Prod. code	U.S. viewers (millions)
24	1	"Camp Refoogee"	Albert Calleros	Josh Bycel & Jonathan Fener	September 10, 2006	2AJN06	8.93
Stan tries to get Steve to attend summer camp; the only one available that he can find, however, turns out to be a refugee camp in Africa. Meanwhile in a parody of Who's Afraid of Virginia Woolf?, Roger and Francine role play as a husband and wife, though they can not agree with mutual backstories.
25	2	"The American Dad After School Special"	Pam Cooke	Dan Vebber	September 17, 2006	2AJN05	7.71
Stan freaks out when he discovers that Steve's new girlfriend (a Goth named Debbie) is fat, but when Hayley, Klaus, and Francine point out that Stan is just as fat as Debbie, Stan takes the news to heart and goes on a crash diet...which turns him anorexic. Meanwhile, Roger falls in love with Debbie.
26	3	"Failure Is Not a Factory-Installed Option"	Rodney Clouden	Etan Cohen	September 24, 2006	2AJN07	8.36
Stan loses his confidence when a car salesman gets the best of him in a negotiation, and plots his revenge. Meanwhile, Roger and Steve set up a makeshift drive-in to try to get to first base with popular schoolgirls, and the saga of Roger's golden, jewel-encrusted turd continues.
27	4	"Lincoln Lover"	Brent Woods	Rick Wiener, Kenny Schwartz & Nahnatchka Khan	November 5, 2006	2AJN11	7.71
Stan gets passed up to speak at the Republican National Convention and is desperate to speak at anything Republican. When he creates a play based on Abraham Lincoln and his close male friend, a local chapter of the Log Cabin Republicans choose Stan to be their speaker. When a twist of events cause Stan to get the treasured speaking spot, he implores the party to let the Log Cabin Republicans in to expand their base.
28	5	"Dungeons and Wagons"	Kurt Dumas & Anthony Lioi	Michael Shipley & Jim Bernstein	November 12, 2006	2AJN08	8.48
After discovering Francine is looking for some excitement in their marriage, Stan gets in the driver's seat and becomes involved in drag racing to spice things up. Meanwhile, Hayley breaks up with her boyfriend Jeff, who joins Steve's world of online gaming.
29	6	"Iced, Iced Babies"	Caleb Meurer	Steve Hely	November 19, 2006	2AJN09	8.24
After Steve begins taking his relationship with his girlfriend to a new level, Francine develops empty nest syndrome and tries to convince Stan, who recently had a vasectomy, to have another baby. Meanwhile, Roger becomes a college professor and Hayley finds a new crush in her classmate Ethan (Elijah Wood), but they find out he's a bit crazy.
30	7	"Of Ice and Men"	John Aoshima	Brian Boyle	November 26, 2006	2AJN10	8.76
In the distant future, a human-again Klaus tells his grandson the story of how Francine reignited Stan's youthful passion for figure skating by becoming his skating partner. In the subplot, when Steve thought he bought a pair of Soviet-era military binoculars from a catalogue, it turns out to be an attractive Russian mail-order bride, which causes a big fight amongst Steve and his friends for her affections.
31	8	"Irregarding Steve"	Pam Cooke	Chris McKenna & Matt McKenna	December 10, 2006	2AJN12	7.11
When Roger helps Steve see how stupid Stan is, they run away to New York to become successful. But Roger puts all of the money they both had into the New York Stock Exchange which he thought it was a Hollywood Stock Exchange, and ends up losing their hotel room and their money. But the only way to fix this is by them becoming hookers, in the style of Midnight Cowboy. Meanwhile, the rest of the family assumes that the two have just run away to the tree house, even though that it is actually being home to a group of squirrels re-enacting scenes from What's Eating Gilbert Grape, which later leaves when it is promptly destroyed during a lightning storm.
32	9	"The Best Christmas Story Never Told"	Albert Calleros	Brian Boyle	December 17, 2006	2AJN14	7.40
With Stan's Christmas spirit at an all-time low (thanks to special interest groups trying to make the holiday season more politically correct), the Ghost of Christmas Past visits him and tries to show him the true meaning of Christmas by taking him to 1970. However, Stan is convinced that Christmas can be saved by killing Jane Fonda. Meanwhile, Roger from the 70s finds a tape from Stan with music from 1974 to 1980, claiming it's from the future and becomes rich and famous as the inventor of disco music.
33	10	"Bush Comes to Dinner"	Mike Kim	Mike Barker & Matt Weitzman	January 7, 2007	2AJN13	9.12
President George W. Bush comes over to the Smiths' house for dinner after Stan wins an essay-writing contest, prompting Hayley to drill him on the Iraq War and his administration's questionable actions. Meanwhile, Steve and Roger try to get the President to open up on Osama bin Laden's exact whereabouts, but ultimately get the President drunk, something Hayley exploits in an effort to bring him down once and for all.
34	11	"American Dream Factory"	Rodney Clouden	Nahnatchka Khan	January 28, 2007	2AJN16	7.49
Stan turns entrepreneur and opens a teddy-bear factory when he feels he is slowing down at work. But when he discovers that quick profit equals hard work, he resorts to using illegal aliens for cheap labor. Meanwhile, Roger begins to take over Steve's rock band.
35	12	"A.T. The Abusive Terrestrial"	Joe Daniello	Dan Vebber	February 11, 2007	2AJN17	6.60
After Roger comes to believe that he and Steve have grown apart, Roger befriends a lonely little boy who turns out to be physically abusive. Meanwhile, Stan and Francine team up to save their favorite soda – Mr. Pibb – when a tour guide tells them that Mr. Pibb is going to be discontinued.
36	13	"Black Mystery Month"	Brent Woods	Laura McCreary	February 18, 2007	2AJN20	7.06
While researching a paper about George Washington Carver in celebration of Black History Month, Steve uncovers a conspiracy that's been going on since the U.S. Civil War and strives to expose it to the public. Meanwhile, Roger stalls during a game of Jenga with Hayley.
37	14	"An Apocalypse to Remember"	John Aoshima	Erik Durbin	March 25, 2007	2AJN19	6.64
A misunderstanding at the CIA leads Stan to believe that the world is coming to an end, and takes his family out into the backcountry. When a survivalist outdoes Stan in wilderness survival, Stan admits he was wrong and returns his family to Langley Falls, however Stan has a new problem as the survivalist is stalking Hayley (his time away from women a breaking point). Meanwhile, Roger seeks to marry a Jewish woman in order to take advantage of wedding gifts, but she chooses to marry the survivalist instead. Note: This episode was dedicated to Taylor Hall.
38	15	"Four Little Words"	Caleb Meurer	David Zuckerman	April 1, 2007	2AJN18	5.94
Stan goes to great lengths to never, ever end up in a situation ending with Francine telling him, "I told you so." She lets him hook his boss Bullock up with her friend, but when Bullock accidentally kills the woman, Stan frames Francine so she will stop asking questions, but how far will he go to stop Francine from saying "I told you so"?
39	16	"When a Stan Loves a Woman"	Rodney Clouden	Rick Wiener & Kenny Schwartz	April 29, 2007	2AJN23	6.71
Stan feels his marriage is on shaky ground after discovering Francine's secret sex garden (Francine planted one rose bush for every man she slept with, and, because of her sexually promiscuous past, she has the biggest sex garden in the country – one that has tour guides and an ancient tribe who has never seen a white man), so Francine bets with Stan to be with another woman and see that sex without love is meaningless. Meanwhile, Steve drinks some of Hayley's Cougar Boost energy drink and begins acting like a meth addict.
40	17	"I Can't Stan You"	Pam Cooke	Michael Shipley & Jim Bernstein	May 6, 2007	2AJN15	6.31
Stan brings some special CIA equipment home to eavesdrop on neighbors, discovering what they really think about him. To get back at them, he has the entire neighborhood evicted, even his own family. He later finds out that everybody hates everybody. Meanwhile, Roger and Steve team up to scam businesses out of money by threatening to file lawsuits against them for faulty quality/service.
41	18	"The Magnificent Steven"	Mike Kim	Steve Hely	May 13, 2007	2AJN21	5.67
While on trial, Stan recounts the time he led his son and his friends on a cattle drive (with cattle that were infected with mad-cow disease) in order to make them more manly (after discovering that Pearl Bailey High's phys ed classes are no longer brutal and competitive). After eating the face of a calf he made Barry kill, he starts to suffer from mad-cow disease. Stan takes them on a cattle drive through town and almost kills them all. A pair of inspectors from the USDA tries to stop them, but Steve and the others get them into the local farm, infecting the entire supply. At the trial, Steve, Snot, and Barry stand up for Stan, saying he did help them become men, except Toshi, who demands that Stan is dangerously insane and must be locked up. Naturally, nobody understands him and believe he said a tear-jerking plea. The judge drops the charges and everything returns to the way it was, like all this never happened. Meanwhile, Roger starts a cat fight between Francine and Hayley after he unintentionally gives one a little more attention, all so he can get a free t-shirt.
42	19	"Joint Custody"	Joe Daniello	Keith Heisler	May 20, 2007	2AJN24	7.62
Roger and Stan become bounty hunters after discovering that Jeff is wanted in Florida for smuggling marijuana. Meanwhile, Steve believes he has psychic powers after getting electrocuted from hot-wiring a car.

== Reception ==
The third-season premiere "Camp Refoogee" received a 5.3 rating share in the Nielsen ratings among viewers age 18 to 49, attracting 8.93 million viewers overall, the second highest rated episode of the entire season. Both of these figures significantly built upon numbers set by the second season finale.

"Lincoln Lover" was nominated for Outstanding Individual Episode by the Gay & Lesbian Alliance Against Defamation at the 18th GLAAD Media Awards. The award is meant to recognize and honor various branches of the media for their outstanding representations of the lesbian, gay, bisexual and transgender (LGBT) community and issues. "The American Dad After School Special" was nominated for the 2007 Annie Award for Best Writing in an Animated Television Production.

The season received generally positive reviews from critics.

== Home media release ==
The first nine episodes of the third season were released on DVD by 20th Century Fox in the United States and Canada on May 17, 2007, five months after they had completed broadcast on television. The "Volume Two" DVD release features bonus material including deleted scenes and commentaries for every episode.

The remaining ten episodes of the third season, along with the first eight of the fourth season, were also released under the title "Volume 3" by 20th Century Fox in the United States and Canada on April 15, 2008, three months after they had completed broadcast on television. The DVD release also features bonus material including deleted scenes, commentaries, and a Comic Con table read.

American Dad! Volume Two
Set details			Special features
19 episodes; 3-disc set; 1.33:1 aspect ratio; Languages: English (Dolby Digital 5.1, with subtitles); Spanish (Dolby Digital, with subtitles); French (Dolby Digital)			Optional commentaries for all 19 episodes; Deleted/extended scenes with optional commentary; "An American Dad Like No Other" featurette; "Drawing Roger" featurette; "Favorite Scenes" featurette; Animatic/storyboards for select episodes; Optional censored audio on select episodes
Release dates			Optional commentaries for all 19 episodes; Deleted/extended scenes with optional commentary; "An American Dad Like No Other" featurette; "Drawing Roger" featurette; "Favorite Scenes" featurette; Animatic/storyboards for select episodes; Optional censored audio on select episodes
Region 1	Region 2	Region 4	Optional commentaries for all 19 episodes; Deleted/extended scenes with optional commentary; "An American Dad Like No Other" featurette; "Drawing Roger" featurette; "Favorite Scenes" featurette; Animatic/storyboards for select episodes; Optional censored audio on select episodes
May 15, 2007	May 28, 2007	May 21, 2007	Optional commentaries for all 19 episodes; Deleted/extended scenes with optional commentary; "An American Dad Like No Other" featurette; "Drawing Roger" featurette; "Favorite Scenes" featurette; Animatic/storyboards for select episodes; Optional censored audio on select episodes

American Dad! Volume Three
Set details			Special features
18 episodes; 3-disc set; 1.33:1 aspect ratio; Languages: English (Dolby Digital 5.1, with subtitles); Spanish (Dolby Digital, with subtitles); French (Dolby Digital)			Optional commentaries for all 18 episodes; Deleted/extended Scenes with optional commentary; Comic Con table read
Release dates			Optional commentaries for all 18 episodes; Deleted/extended Scenes with optional commentary; Comic Con table read
Region 1	Region 2	Region 4	Optional commentaries for all 18 episodes; Deleted/extended Scenes with optional commentary; Comic Con table read
April 15, 2008	May 12, 2008	May 14, 2009	Optional commentaries for all 18 episodes; Deleted/extended Scenes with optional commentary; Comic Con table read
