= Listen for the Lie =

2023 mystery novel by Amy Tintera

- Author: Amy Tintera
- Genre: Mystery
- Publisher: Celadon Books
- Publication date: March 5, 2024
- ISBN: 978-1-250-88031-4

Listen for the Lie is a 2024 mystery novel by American author Amy Tintera. The novel follows Lucy Chase as investigates the murder of her best friend, with the help of true crime podcaster Ben Owens.

== Background and publication ==
Listen for the Lie was published by Celadon Books on March 5, 2024. Prior to 2024, Amy Tintera had written several young adult novels. Listen for the Lie is Tintera's first novel for an adult readership.

== Plot ==
The novel follows Lucy Chase, who was suspected of killing her best friend, Savannah "Savvy" Harper, five years earlier. Lucy was found covered in blood shortly after Savvy was killed, but has no memory of that night, and does not know if she is responsible for her friend's death. Shortly after true crime podcaster Ben Owens begins investigating Savvy's murder on his podcast Listen for the Lie, Lucy returns to her hometown of Plumpton, Texas to attend her grandmother's birthday party. Lucy soon begins working with Ben to uncover the truth of what happened to Savvy.
