= Vera Wong's Unsolicited Advice for Murderers =

2023 novel by Jesse Q. Sutanto

- First edition paperback cover
- Author: Jesse Q. Sutanto
- Cover artist: Vikki Chu
- Language: English
- Genre: Murder mystery; comic novel
- Publisher: Berkley Books
- Publication date: March 14, 2023
- Publication place: United States
- Pages: 352
- ISBN: 9780593549223
- Followed by: Vera Wong's Guide to Snooping (on a Dead Man)

Vera Wong's Unsolicited Advice for Murderers is a murder mystery novel by Chinese-Indonesian author Jesse Q. Sutanto. It was published in the United States by Berkley Books on March 14, 2023. It follows a Chinese-American widow who decides to conduct her own investigation after finding a dead body on the floor of her tea shop. It received positive reviews from critics and won an Edgar Allan Poe Award for Best Paperback Original. A television adaptation by Warner Bros. Television was announced in April 2023.

== Background ==
Sutanto came up with the idea for the novel while writing The Good, the Bad, and the Aunties, which features older Chinese women as side characters. She decided she wanted to write a book from the perspective of an older Chinese woman. She has described Vera as being 75% inspired by her mother and 25% inspired by her father. When she pitched the idea to her publisher, they pushed back the deadline for the third book in her Aunties series so that they could publish this novel first. She did not know what the tone of the novel would be until she started writing the first chapter.

== Synopsis ==
In San Francisco's Chinatown, 60-year-old widow Vera Wong wakes up one morning to find a dead man clutching a USB drive on the floor of her tea shop. After taking the drive, she calls the police, who determine that the man—Marshall Chen—likely broke in and overdosed on MDMA. Vera, however, suspects murder. She starts her own investigation and becomes entangled in the lives of her young suspects, each of whom have a secret that links them to the victim.

== Reception ==
The novel won an Edgar Allan Poe Award for Best Paperback Original. It was shortlisted for a Gold Dagger Award. It was a finalist for a Barry Award for Best Paperback Original. It was nominated for a Goodreads Choice Award for Mystery & Thriller.

Kirkus Reviews praised its "[g]entle humor and abundant heart" and the "[v]ivid sensory descriptions" of Vera's teas, and described the relationships that form between Vera and her four main suspects as "tender". Tristan Draper of Library Journal praised the novel's "lovably flawed" characters and wrote that it has "plenty of twists to keep readers guessing" and that Wong's case notes "add humor to the deductive process." Publishers Weekly praised its "engrossing" plot and "satisfying" conclusion. Karen MacPherson of The Washington Post wrote that Sutanto "deftly combines her Indonesian-Chinese background, quick wit, a fast-paced plot and a quirky protagonist to create a highly entertaining mystery with a nifty twist at the end." Chris Hewitt of The Minnesota Star Tribune wrote that the novel "isn't really a mystery", but called Vera an "indelible comic creation".

== Audiobook ==
An audiobook narrated by Eunice Wong was released concurrently with the paperback, ebook, and hardcover editions. It won an Audie Award for Mystery. Kirkus Reviews praised Wong's "brisk" performance and wrote that she manages its large cast with "plenty of energy and enthusiasm". Laura Hammond of Library Journal praised Wong's "deft" narration. Katherine A. Powers of The Washington Post wrote that Wong's "versatile voice moves from character to character with ease and persuasiveness."

== Television adaptation ==
A television adaptation by Warner Bros. Television was announced on April 10, 2023. It will be developed by Harpo Films and Kaling International.
