= Chuck Greaves =

American author

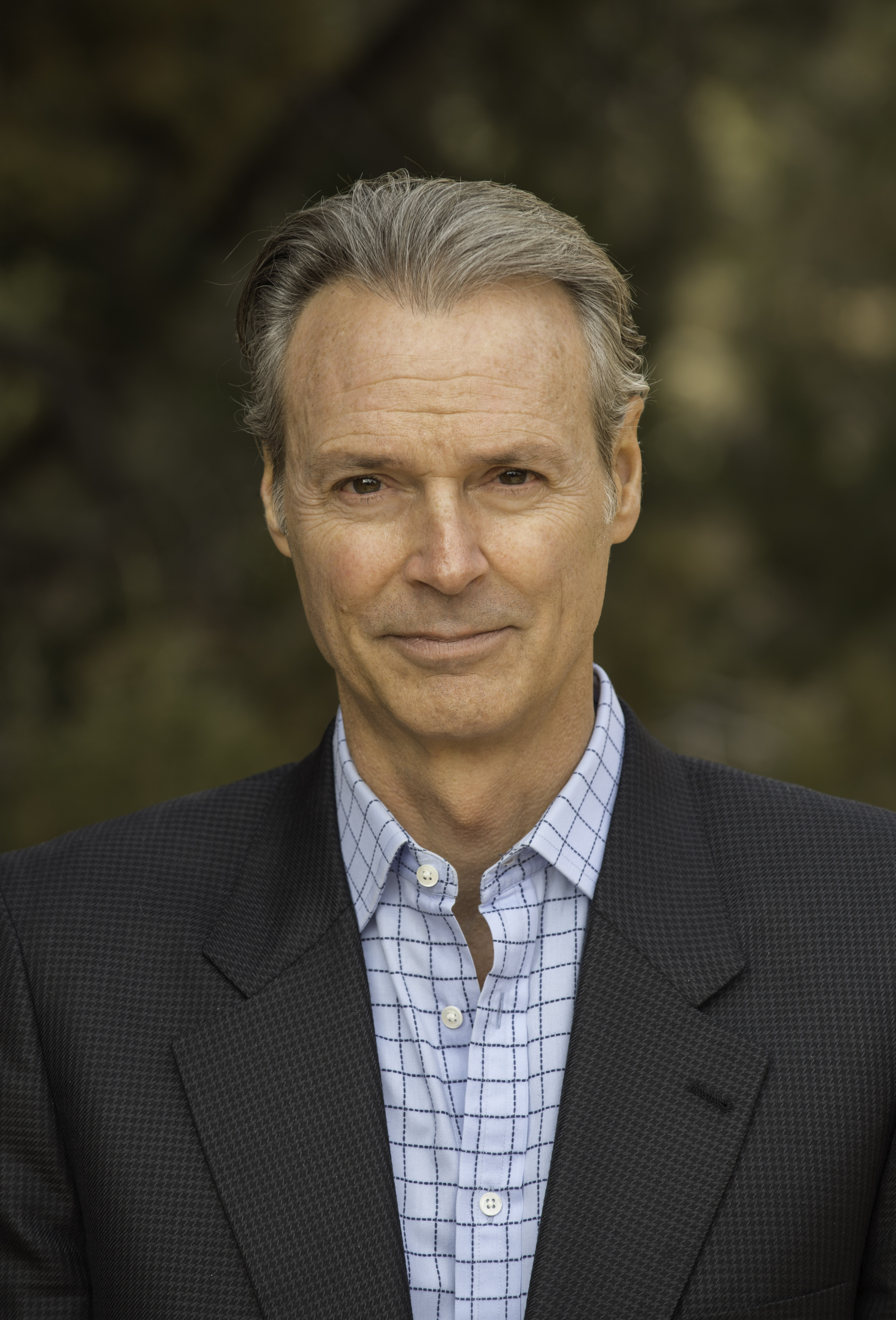
- Born: Charles Joseph Greaves; December 14, 1955 (age 70)
- Education: University of Southern California; Boston College Law School
- Occupations: Author, screenwriter
- Notable work: Jack MacTaggart Mystery Series
- Spouse: Lynda Larsen
- Website: chuckgreaves.com

Charles Joseph Greaves (born December 14, 1955) is an American author of both crime fiction (as Chuck Greaves) and general fiction (as C. Joseph Greaves).

Greaves is best known for his Jack MacTaggart series of legal mysteries, which are set in Los Angeles, where Greaves practiced law for 25 years. The Jack MacTaggart series consists of four books: Hush Money (2012), Green-Eyed Lady (2013), The Last Heir (2014), and The Chimera Club (2022).

As of 2023, he has also written three standalone novels: Hard Twisted (2012), Tom & Lucky and George & Cokey Flo (2015), and Church of the Graveyard Saints (2019).

== Personal life ==
Raised in Levittown, New York, Greaves graduated with honors from both the University of Southern California and Boston College Law School. He currently lives in Cortez, Colorado with his wife, Lynda.

== Awards and honors ==
In 2015, The Wall Street Journal included Tom & Lucky and George & Cokey Flo on their list of the year's best books.

Awards for Greaves's writing
Year	Title	Award	Result	Ref.
2012	Hush Money	New Mexico-Arizona Book Award	Finalist	
2012	Hush Money	Shamus Award for Best First PI Novel	Finalist	
2013	Hush Money	Audie Award for Mystery	Finalist	
2013	Hush Money	Left Coast Crime Rocky Award	Finalist	
2013	Hard Twisted	Oklahoma Book Award for iction	Finalist	
2015	The Last Heir	Colorado Book Award for Mystery	Finalist	
2016	Tom & Lucky and George & Cokey Flo	Harper Lee Prize	Finalist	
2016	Tom & Lucky and George & Cokey Flo	Sue Feder Historical Mystery Award	Finalist	
2023	The Chimera Club	Colorado Authors League Award	Winner	
2023	The Chimera Club	Colorado Book Award for Mystery	Finalist	

== Publications ==
=== Jack MacTaggart series ===
- Hush Money. Minotaur Books. 2012. ISBN 9781250005236.
- Green-Eyed Lady. Minotaur Books. 2013. ISBN 9781250005243.
- The Last Heir. Minotaur Books. 2014. ISBN 9781250045560.
- The Chimera Club. Tallow Lane Books. 2022. ISBN 9780578396675.

=== Other novels ===
- Hard Twisted. Bloomsbury USA. 2012. ISBN 9781608198559.
- Tom & Lucky and George & Cokey Flo. Bloomsbury USA. 2015. ISBN 9781620407851.
- Church of the Graveyard Saints. Torrey House Press. 2019. ISBN 978-1-948814-13-3.
