= The American Dad After School Special =

- American Dad! episode
- Episode no.: Season 3 Episode 2
- Directed by: Pam Cooke
- Written by: Dan Vebber
- Production code: 2AJN05
- Original air date: September 17, 2006

Guest appearances
- Azura Skye as Veronica; Ron Lynch as Counselor

Episode chronology
← Previous "Camp Refoogee"	Next → "Failure is Not a Factory-Installed Option"
- American Dad! season 2

"The American Dad After School Special" is the second episode of the third season, and the twenty-fifth overall episode, of the animated comedy series American Dad!. It aired on Fox in the United States on September 17, 2006, and is written by Dan Vebber and directed by Pam Cooke.

In the episode, Steve falls for an overweight girl, and the appearance-obsessed Stan is so appalled by the way she looks that he develops anorexia. Roger, however, falls for her, too, and attempts to sabotage her relationship with Steve.

== Plot ==
Steve, while attempting to escape from gym class, finds a hideout used by a gothic, overweight girl named Debbie, whom he finds fascinating and on whom he develops a crush. When Steve tells his father about his new girlfriend, Stan is delighted to hear the news and he even helps Steve to build up the courage to ask her out by using an explosive collar that will kill him within twenty-four hours if he doesn't. However, Stan messes up the programming while activating the device, accidentally setting it to kill Steve in just twenty-four minutes instead.

Eventually, Steve manages to ask Debbie out, and the two begin dating each other while making plans to invite Debbie to meet Steve's family. However, when Stan sees Debbie for the first time via security camera, he becomes appalled by the fact that she's fat, and he forces the family to hide in the safe room of their house until Debbie leaves. Francine and Hayley then berate Stan for his behavior, and they (along with Klaus) are even able to point out his hypocrisy in which he is somewhat overweight after letting himself go over time. When Stan realizes they're right after checking himself in the mirror, he decides to go on a crazy exercise program and starts to gain an unhealthy obsession with his weight. While working out, Stan meets a personal trainer named Zack, who is depicted as being verbally abusive while also wearing a trucker's cap, and he's able to help him with his constant workout routine.

Steve continues dating Debbie, not realizing that Roger is secretly in love with her, especially while watching them kissing each other. Meanwhile, Stan becomes surprised to learn that the more he exercises and the less he eats, the fatter and fatter he gets; he then suspects that Francine and Hayley are tampering with his vegetables to make him fatter, which turns out to be true. Shortly after, he is eventually suspended from the CIA for his "weight problem" when he passes out during a physical after taking just a couple of steps past the starting line. Upon coming home, Stan's family engages in an intervention with him over his weight problem, to which it's revealed that Stan's fat body was a figment of his delusional imagination; instead, he was getting thinner to the point where he was almost becoming like a skeleton, and the reason for him thinking that he was getting fatter was because of it being a symptom of anorexia. It is also revealed that Stan's trainer, Zack, is also a part of the former's imagination.

Francine, Hayley, and Steve are then able to force Stan to attend an anorexia support group, which is mostly populated by teenage girls (and run by a man who either doesn't notice or care that Stan is a grown man). During the meeting, Stan befriends an anorexic girl named Veronica, who teaches Stan how to consume food without actually eating it, which he's able to do when his family feeds him. He's even able to get rid of some of his food by feeding it to Klaus, who starts to become so big that he outgrows his fishbowl shortly after. Steve then decides to dump Debbie due to him thinking that it will help make his father feel better after believing that she was the source of Stan's weight problem. Stan then decides to set Steve up on a date with Veronica, thinking that she is much more suitable for his son due to her not being fat like Debbie.

Meanwhile, Francine is able to take out the garbage and drops an empty bottle onto the swimming pool cover. She accidentally falls into the pool while trying to get the bottle, and she and Hayley both shockingly discover all the uneaten food that Stan had gotten rid of, realizing that he never actually ate any of it when they tried to feed him.

During Steve's date with Veronica, Roger goes out with Debbie in the same restaurant while pretending to be part of an Anne Rice fan club. After realizing that Steve is also in the restaurant with them, he attempts to make Steve jealous by trying to make out with Debbie. Just then, Francine and Hayley both show up to confront Stan after they discovered his secret, and Steve becomes quite upset with his father after realizing that breaking up with Debbie didn't help him in any way. Steve then explains to Stan how much he loved Debbie, and that he didn't care if she was fat or thin while also calling out his displeasure of Stan's fatphobia. Debbie, who was in the same room as Steve, hears everything, and the two are happily reunited again, much to Roger's unhappiness. When Stan realizes how happy the two of them are together, he starts to feel bad on both the inside and the outside. He decides to start eating for real by dining on some rolls in the restaurant, which also causes Zack to disappear physically, ending Stan's anorexia.

== Reception ==
The episode was watched by a total of 7.71 million people; this made it the third most-watched show on Animation Domination that night, losing to The Simpsons and Family Guy which had 9.23 million viewers. Daniel Solomon of Cinema Blend called the episode the best of the season: "The device that the writers use to display Stan's problem is both a visual metaphor for the distorted self-image of people with anorexia, as well as a narrative twist for the audience".
