= Stan of Arabia: Part 1 =

- American Dad! episode
- Episode no.: Season 2 Episode 5
- Directed by: Rodney Clouden
- Written by: Nahnatchka Khan
- Production code: 1AJN12
- Original air date: November 6, 2005

Episode chronology
← Previous "Con Heir"	Next → "Stan of Arabia: Part 2"
- American Dad! season 2

"Stan of Arabia: Part 1" is the twelfth episode of the American Dad! season 1 season of the American animated television series American Dad!. It originally aired on Fox in the United States on November 6, 2005. In the episode, the Smiths are relocated to Saudi Arabia after Stan ruins his boss’s party. The episode was originally conceived to be an hour-long, but was split into two separate parts after network setbacks. The episode contains several references to Lawrence of Arabia, along with other pieces of popular culture.

The episode was written by Nahnatchka Khan and directed by Rodney Clouden.

== Plot ==
Stan and his cohorts meet at a park to discuss planning a surprise 25th-anniversary celebration for Bullock. Bullock, of course, is spying on them and Stan takes all of the credit for the party idea. Bullock is pleased. At home, Stan tells Francine the good news: she’s in charge of planning Bullock’s party for Saturday. However, that’s the same night that Francine is due to appear in a play.

Meanwhile, Hayley and Steve take in the new Michael Moore movie, which features him having sex with Angelina Jolie. Hayley is outraged by his selling out. On Saturday night, Stan is getting ready for the party, while Francine is dressed for her play. She ignores Stan’s demands, declaring marriage to be an equal partnership. At the party, Stan breaks Jay Leno's neck when he, due to Francine's absence, insinuates to Stan that Francine wears the pants in their family, and has to perform the roast by himself. It goes wrong and Stan is thrown out. Stan sings a song about how he doesn’t want an equal partner, but a wife who will listen to his every demand. In the process, he dances his way into a family's house and trashes their dinner.

The next day, Bullock relocates Stan and his family to Saudi Arabia as a punishment for the roast. The family initially enjoys the chance to experience new things, but Roger freaks out upon learning that alcohol is banned in Saudi Arabia. Meanwhile, Stan receives his new mission: overseeing guards protecting a pipeline that's being built. As the family adjusts to the new culture, Francine finds that she likes the neighboring women, although she doesn’t like how they cater to their men. Stan, however, learns about the country's strict moral codes from his new co-workers and finds that he loves it, especially the ones that involve women. Steve is thrilled to discover that he is not only considered a man but can fire guns whenever he wants. Stan begins throwing orders around but Francine resists. At the same time, Hayley is begging Steve to accompany her to the bazaar so she can leave the house. Roger, hidden in a burka, goes with them. At home that night, Stan introduces Francine to his new second wife. Back at the bazaar, Steve sells Roger to a man who thinks Roger is a woman.

With his new money, Steve buys a Mercedes, sunglasses, grenades, and a bootleg DVD of the Michael Moore documentary from earlier. During a dinner party, Stan enjoys himself with his new friends, even accepting a robe as a gift, while Francine engages in a brutal fight with his second wife. Bullock calls and tells Stan he can have his old job in the States back but Stan says that he likes Saudi Arabia. Meanwhile, the other Smiths are in grave trouble: Steve crashes his Mercedes into an oil derrick in the middle of the desert, Roger is being taken to a remote location by his new husband, Hayley is running from the morality police, and Francine is being smacked with the dishwasher by her rival. Stan angrily tells Bullock he renounces his American citizenship and burns the family's passports; he intends to stay on the Arabian peninsula.

== Production ==
"Stan of Arabia: Part 1" frequently lampoons Saudi Arabian culture and misogynistic tendencies. In 2006, during an interview with MovieWeb, Mike Barker and Matt Weitzman named it their favorite episode of the season, saying they were "really fond of the (episode)." They then went on to note that the episode was "actually intended to be a one-hour special when we kind of pitched the idea to the network. They said, "Go for it! We can do that." And then suddenly it's like, "We can't do that." As a one-hour it was really nice and pure and clean, and now it's a two-parter but I think it still works really well."

== Reception ==
"Stan of Arabia" first aired on Fox on November 6, 2005. The episode's original broadcast attracted 7.30 million viewers, with a 4.5 rating in the 18-49 demographic; this made it the fourth most watched show on Animation Domination that night, losing to King of the Hill, Family Guy and The Simpsons. The episode's ratings were slightly down from the previous episode, "Con Heir", which attracted 7.40 million viewers and a 4.4 rating in the 18-49 demographic. Ryan Budke of AOL TV gave the episode a positive review, saying "Last night's episode was one of the best that I've seen. Stan's musical number about wanting a "wife" and not a "partner" was pretty funny and almost everything in Saudi Arabia was spot-on."

This episode, along with its second-part Stan of Arabia: Part 2, is banned by the government of Saudi Arabia, who claim it was "promoting Islamophobia and anti-Arabism".
