= All About Steve (American Dad!) =

- American Dad! episode
- Episode no.: Season 2 Episode 3
- Directed by: Mike Kim
- Written by: Chris McKenna; Matt McKenna
- Production code: 1AJN08
- Original air date: September 25, 2005

Guest appearances
- Stephen Colbert as Dentist; Brian Posehn as Dan Vebber

Episode chronology
← Previous "A Smith in the Hand"	Next → "Con Heir"
- American Dad! season 2

"All About Steve" is the third episode of the second season and the tenth overall episode of the animated comedy series American Dad!. It aired on Fox in the United States on September 25, 2005, and is written by Chris McKenna and Matt McKenna and directed by Mike Kim.

In the episode, after disowning Steve for being a geek, Stan must rely on his son's knowledge of science fiction and fantasy to catch a cyber-terrorist.

== Plot ==
A hacker shuts down a hydroelectric power plant. When the helicopter carrying Tom Jorgensen, the man who is the "single most valuable weapon in the war against terror", tragically collides against the dam, all of the CIA's remaining resources are focused on catching the hacker. But first they practice for the father-son softball game. Stan talks up Steve as an "absolute warrior", which Steve of course is not, outside of Dungeons & Dragons. He takes Steve to the batting cage to polish his skills, only to have the "big slugger" show that he is not the athlete that Stan thinks he is. So Steve can see how professionals hit the ball, Stan takes Steve and his friends to a Yankees game and to the locker room to meet Derek Jeter. But when the four nerds take off their baseball jackets to reveal not Yankees uniforms but Star Trek uniforms, Jeter tells Stan that his son is a geek.

In denial, Stan runs home. He finds Steve's nerd toys, and an algebra book hidden inside a pornography magazine. Horrified, he tells his wife Francine that he would prefer Steve to be the product of a torrid affair than for such a nerd be his own child. He breaks out in a stress rash and grinds his teeth into misalignment. Stan ditches Steve (pretending it was raining) and brings a mid-20s-aged African-American ringer ("Darnelle" Smith) instead to the softball game. Steve figures out he has been ditched and becomes angry. Stan goes to the dentist, because he now needs to get braces due to his being a "class A grinder." Now that Stan has zits and braces, the other CIA agents make fun of him and treat him derisively. They ditch him when they go on a mosque raid, in exactly the same way that Stan ditched Steve. Stan returns home to the basement and finds that the hacker's language is the same language used in Steve's card game, "Elvish." Steve's friend Snot adjusts Stan's braces' "rear bracket" to get rid of his lisp, and they translate the hacker's notes, discovering who the hacker is. Stan's stress zits go away. They go to the science fiction convention to find the hacker, "Dan Vebber", a J.R.R. Tolkien fan who "hopes to create a Middle-Earth in the here and now."

Roger feels cooped up in the house, like it is a prison without the thrill of a daily cavity search. Hayley's first idea, going to the beach with Roger posing as a Saudi exchange student and thus dressed in a burqa, does not satisfy him. Next, Roger gets a job as a Jumbo Juice costumed advertising man, but this ends when the Taco King mascot beats him up for being in his territory. Hayley takes Roger to the science fiction convention, where he can pretend to just be in costume. At the convention, Roger finds that the one human he probed (and whose Celica he set fire to) is there. The human's name is Kurt, and he went insane after the abduction. Roger spends the next two hours in the bathroom hiding from Kurt, both because the probing is presented with the undertone of a one night stand and because Kurt wants to show Roger to his ex-wife Eileen to prove aliens exist, which would blow Roger's cover. Stan and the four nerds look for Dan Vebber, who is giving a keynote on Frodo Baggins v. Luke Skywalker. After a fight and chase, Stan and Steve corner Dan Vebber. Steve burns a pair of Peter Jackson's underwear to distract Dan, before Stan shoots Dan in the leg. Stan tells Avery that the credit belongs to Steve.

== Production ==
The episode aired on Fox in the United States on September 25, 2005, and was written by Chris McKenna and Matt McKenna and directed by Mike Kim. In 2006, during an interview with MovieWeb, Mike Barker spoke about where the idea for the episode came from, saying "All About Steve" is an episode where Stan wants his son to be more of a jock and more like he was when he was his age. That whole episode came about from one of our writers Dave Hemingson coming into our office, telling us he just visited the dentist and he may need to get braces. And the idea of a grown man with braces appealed to us and we just decided, "What if we put Stan in braces?" And he understands for the first time what it's like to feel like a geek."

== Reception ==
Ryan Budke of AOL TV gave the episode a negative review, saying that the show was becoming repetitive with two consecutive episodes about Stan and Steve finding common ground; "American Dad has a lot of potential, but it is certainly not living up to much of it." The episode was watched by a total of 7.63 million people; this made it the third most watched show on Animation Domination that night, beating King of the Hill but losing to Family Guy and The Simpsons, which had 10.19 million viewers.
