= Amy Tintera =

American author

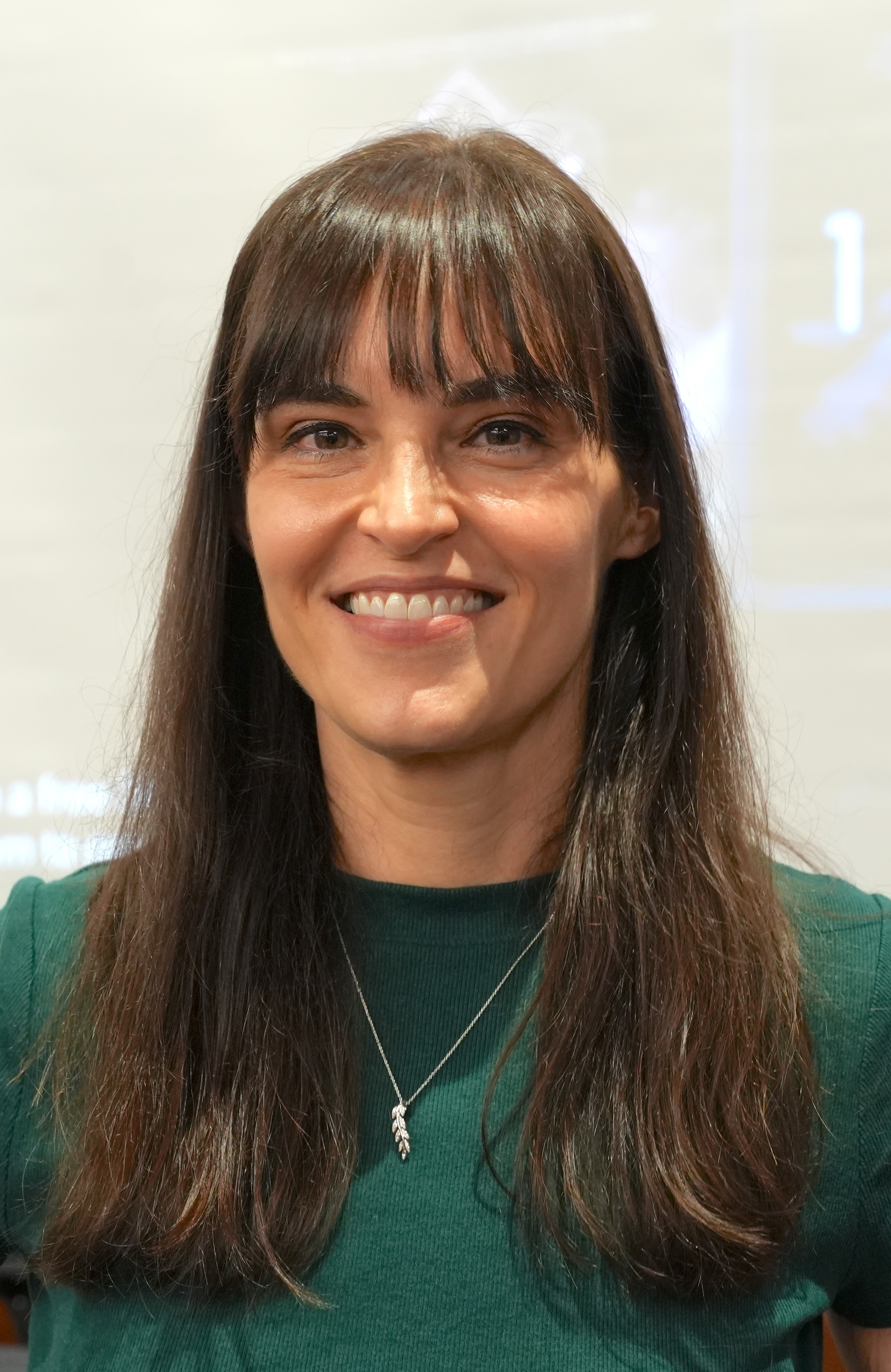
- Tintera in 2025 at the Los Angeles Times Festival of Books
- Born: Austin, Texas, USA
- Education: Texas A&M University; Emerson College
- Website: amytintera.com

Amy Tintera is an American author of adult and young adult fiction. She is the author of the young adult novel The Q (2022), as well as the Reboot duology (Reboot, 2013 and Rebel, 2014), Ruined trilogy (Ruined, 2016; Avenged, 2017; and Allied, 2019) These Monsters duology (All These Monsters, 2020 and All These Warriors, 2021). She published her debut adult mystery novel, Listen for the Lie, in 2024.

Tintera was raised in Austin, Texas. She received a bachelor's degree in journalism from Texas A&M University, followed by a master's degree in media arts and screenwriting from Emerson College. As of 2026, she lives in Los Angeles.

== Career ==
Tintera started her writing career publishing young adult dystopian novels. She published her debut novel, Reboot, with HarperTeen in 2013. The novel became the first in the Reboot duology, followed by Rebel, published by HarperTeen in 2014. In 2012, Fox 2000 purchased rights to adapt Reboot into a film.

Tintera followed the Reboot duology with the Ruined trilogy, a series of fantasy novels published by HarperTeen, starting with Ruined in 2016, followed by Avenged in 2017, then concluding with Allied in 2019.

The Monsters duology started with All These Monsters, published by Houghton Mifflin Harcourt in 2020, followed by All These Warriors in 2021. In 2021, the Young Adult Library Services Association named All These Monsters on their list of the year's Best Fiction for Young Adults.

In 2022, Tintera published her first standalone novel, The Q, with Crown. The novel was a finalist for the 2023 Cybils Award for Young Adult Speculative Fiction.

In 2024, she published her first adult novel, Listen for the Lie, a mystery, with Celadon Books. The novel, which uses a podcasting format to unravel a murder mystery, won the California Independent Booksellers Alliance's Golden Poppy Award for Mystery, and was nominated for the Goodreads Choice Award for Mystery & Thriller. In 2025, was also a finalist for the International Thriller Writers Award for Mystery and shortlisted for the Edgar Allan Poe Award for Best Novel. Amazon and The Washington Post named it one of the best thrillers of the year, and NPR included it on their annual list of "Books We Love". The Listen for the Lie audiobook is narrated by American actress January LaVoy and Will Damron. In 2024, Booklist named the audiobook one of the year's top 10 mysteries and thrillers on audio, and it was nominated for the Goodreads Choice Award for Readers' Favorite Audiobook. In 2025, it won the Audie Award for Mystery.

== Publications ==
=== Adult novels ===
- Listen for the Lie. Audiobook narrated by January LaVoy and Will Damron. Celadon Books. 2024. ISBN 978-1-250-88031-4.

=== Young adult novels ===
- Reboot. Reboot duology. HarperTeen. 2013. ISBN 978-0-06-221707-3.
- Rebel. Reboot duology. HarperTeen. 2014. ISBN 978-0-06-221710-3.
- Ruined. Ruined trilogy. HarperTeen. 2016. ISBN 978-0-06-239660-0.
- Avenged. Ruined trilogy. HarperTeen. 2017. ISBN 978-0-06-239663-1.
- Allied. Ruined trilogy. HarperTeen. 2019. ISBN 978-0-062-39667-9.
- All These Monsters. The Monsters duology. Houghton Mifflin Harcourt. 2020. ISBN 978-0-358-01240-5.
- All These Warriors. The Monsters duology. Clarion Books. 2021. ISBN 978-0-358-01240-5.
- The Q. Crown. 2022. ISBN 978-0-593-48617-7.
