= Vera Wong's Guide to Snooping (on a Dead Man) =

2025 novel by Jesse Q. Sutanto

- First edition American paperback cover
- Author: Jesse Q. Sutanto
- Cover artist: Vikki Chu
- Language: English
- Genre: Murder mystery; comic novel
- Publisher: Berkley Books
- Publication date: April 1, 2025
- Publication place: United States
- Pages: 336
- ISBN: 9780593546253
- Preceded by: Vera Wong's Unsolicited Advice for Murderers

Vera Wong's Guide to Snooping (on a Dead Man) is a murder mystery novel by Chinese-Indonesian author Jesse Q. Sutanto. It was published in the United States by Berkley Books on April 1, 2025. It is the sequel to the 2023 novel Vera Wong's Unsolicited Advice for Murderers. It follows Vera Wong as she investigates the death of a social media influencer. It received positive reviews from critics.

== Synopsis ==
After reporting a phone scam to the police, sixty-one-year-old Chinese American tea shop owner Vera Wong stumbles into a young woman named Millie, whose friend Thomas Smith has gone missing. After sleuthing, Vera discovers that Thomas' real name is Xander Lin, and used a pseudonym with his friends to hide his identity as a famous social media influencer, and has recently drowned. Determined to find out whether his death was a murder, she tracks down his girlfriend, his talent manager, and his grandfather, and discovers that nobody one really knew him. To expand her search, Vera becomes a social media influencer herself.

== Reception ==
The novel was nominated for a Lilian Jackson Braun Award and a Goodreads Choice Award for Mystery & Thriller. The audiobook, narrated by Eunice Wong, was nominated for an Audie Award for Mystery.

Kirkus Reviews called the novel a "warmhearted valentine to the families built by the heroine". Tristan Draper of Library Journal called it "hilarious" and "heartwarming", and praised its "strong cast of characters". Oline H. Cogdill of Shelf Awareness praised its "fine mixture of humor and heavy themes". Sarah Weinman listed it as one of the best mystery novels of 2025 in an article for The New York Times. Sandra Dallas called the book "a delight" in her review for The Denver Post.
