= Dial A for Aunties =

Novel by Jesse Q. Sutano

- Author: Jesse Q. Sutanto
- Language: English
- Genre: Comedy, Mystery fiction, Thriller, Caper story
- Publisher: Berkley Books
- Publication date: 27 April 2021
- ISBN: 0593333039
- OCLC: 1242776219
- Followed by: Four Aunties and a Wedding

Dial A for Aunties is a comedy caper novel written by Chinese-Indonesian author Jesse Q. Sutanto. It is the first book in a trilogy and was followed by Four Aunties and a Wedding (2022) and The Good, the Bad, and the Aunties (2024). Sutanto was awarded the Comedy Women in Print Prize for the novel.

== Plot ==
Meddelin Chan, a 26-year-old photographer working for her family's wedding business, accidentally kills her blind date. Her mother calls in her aunts to help dispose of the body, though their plan is compromised when it is stored in a cooler and accidentally shipped to a wedding at an island resort that the family is working at. The climax of the book is when Meddy tells Nathan that she was the one who killed Ah Guan.

== Reception ==
Sarah Weinman of The New York Times Book Review stated: "The glue is Meddelin, endearing, capable and in full thrall to her elders, who are all absolute hoots to keep company with." Maya Gittleman of Bookreporter.com called the novel "brilliantly crafted", "compulsively fun to read" and "gnuinely hilarious, romantic and sweet". Kirkus Reviews stated: "Readers will die for the delightfully absurd hijinks in this dark comedy." Publishers Weekly opined: "There’s plenty of light entertainment here, but don’t expect anything with bite."

== Adaptations ==
In 2020, prior to the novel's publication, the film rights were bought by Netflix in a bidding war. Nahnatchka Khan was set to direct the film.
