= American Dad! season 2 =

American Dad!
- Season 2
- DVD box sets for American Dad! Volumes 1 and 2; the season was released in two separate volumes.
- Starring: Seth MacFarlane; Wendy Schaal; Scott Grimes; Rachael MacFarlane; Dee Bradley Baker
- No. of episodes: 16

Release
- Original network: Fox
- Original release: September 11, 2005 – May 14, 2006

Season chronology
- ← Previous; Season 1 Next → Season 3

The second season of the American TV series American Dad! originally aired on Fox from September 11, 2005, to May 14, 2006, and consisted of sixteen episodes. The first six episodes of the season are included within the Volume 1 DVD box set, which was released on April 25, 2006.

== Episodes ==
No. overall	No. in season	Title	Directed by	Written by	Original release date	Prod. code	U.S. viewers (millions)
8	1	"Bullocks to Stan"	Brent Woods	Alison McDonald	September 11, 2005	1AJN09	7.83
Stan finds Deputy Director Bullock, his supervisor, starting a relationship with Hayley. However, he cannot risk saying or doing anything about it because he is up for a promotion at the CIA. He tries to make Jeff tougher so Hayley will take him back, but the plan backfires when Hayley dumps Bullock and takes Jeff back, leading Bullock to order Stan to kill Jeff in order to get his promotion. Meanwhile, Steve finds Dick Cheney's BlackBerry and uses the contact numbers to play pranks on political figures.
9	2	"A Smith in the Hand"	Pam Cooke	David Hemingson	September 18, 2005	1AJN10	8.60
Upon finding out that Steve's school is giving a sex education class, Stan volunteers to teach a more wholesome and clean class himself. Stan has never masturbated prior to this and teaches Steve that it is wrong. However, after getting a groin injury and having to rub ointment on himself, he discovers masturbation and becomes addicted to it. Meanwhile, Roger turns the attic into a bar after Hayley accuses him of wasting his life by eating junk food and watching trashy reality TV shows.
10	3	"All About Steve"	Mike Kim	Chris McKenna & Matt McKenna	September 25, 2005	1AJN08	7.63
Stan discovers and is ashamed of Steve's geekiness and disowns him, but the stress of this causes damage to Stan's body, causing him to physically revert into a nerd. When Steve breaks the code of a cyber-terrorist, the two must unite to save the world, and Stan comes to accept that nerds can do "macho" jobs such as counter-terrorism. Meanwhile, Hayley helps Roger find a suitable way to interact with the outside world without getting exposed as an alien.
11	4	"Con Heir"	Albert Calleros	Steve Hely	October 2, 2005	1AJN11	7.43
After his father's death, Stan reveals to his family that the man they called Grandpa was not their grandfather. Meanwhile, Steve goes out with his pseudo-grandfather's elderly friend.
12	5	"Stan of Arabia: Part 1"	Rodney Clouden	Nahnatchka Khan	November 6, 2005	1AJN12	7.30
After doing a terrible job standing in for Jay Leno at Bullock's anniversary roast, Stan is reassigned to Saudi Arabia. While his family except Steve begins to go through hell, Stan discovers all of his greatest fantasies come true under the male-dominated society. To be continued...
13	6	"Stan of Arabia: Part 2"	Anthony Lioi	Carter Bays & Craig Thomas	November 13, 2005	1AJN13	7.74
Stan has renounced his American citizenship to live in Saudi Arabia, though his family finds themselves in their own awkward situations that lead them to getting sentenced to death by stoning. Meanwhile, Roger is wooed by an Arab prince.
14	7	"Stannie Get Your Gun"	John Aoshima	Brian Boyle	November 20, 2005	1AJN14	8.19
Stan and Hayley attempt to bond, but things are difficult due to Stan's obsession with guns and Hayley's stance against them. In the process, Hayley herself accidentally shoots Stan and paralyzes him. Meanwhile, Roger wants to get back at Steve for eating his cookie by convincing him he is adopted and later was kidnapped by Stan and Francine.
15	8	"Star Trek"	Mike Kim	Chris McKenna & Matt McKenna	November 27, 2005	1AJN15	8.80
A drowned Steve tells the story of how he became famous for writing a story about Roger the alien, and how his parents exploited his talents to get what they want.
16	9	"Not Particularly Desperate Housewives"	Brent Woods	Dan Vebber	December 18, 2005	1AJN16	7.84
Francine pretends to be having an extra-marital affair so that she can join an exclusive women's club called The Ladybugs. However, Francine's life is threatened when she asks to quit. Meanwhile, Stan and Roger fight over the attention of an adorable little dog, and Hayley locks Steve and Klaus in her closet for reading her diary.
17	10	"Rough Trade"	Pam Cooke	David Zuckerman	January 8, 2006	1AJN17	6.89
Stan and Roger experience life in each other's shoes after Stan is arrested for a DUI and is put on house arrest and Roger is made the man of the house, which leads to disaster.
18	11	"Finances with Wolves"	Albert Calleros	Neal Boushell & Sam O'Neal	January 29, 2006	1AJN18	8.23
Stan gets a hefty bonus at work and uses all it on himself, while Francine uses a part of the bonus to open a muffin shop without Stan's approval. Klaus tricks Stan into putting Klaus's brain back into a human body, then heads to Francine's muffin shop in an attempt to seduce her. Meanwhile, Steve is convinced he's becoming a werewolf after being attacked by a wolf.
19	12	"It's Good to Be the Queen"	Rodney Clouden	Alison McDonald	February 26, 2006	1AJN19	7.70
Stan seeks revenge for being the focus of a prank during his high school years by showing off that he married Francine, who is the homecoming queen. However, when they find two uncounted votes for Francine's arch-rival, Betty Sue, and her title is revealed to be a mistake, Stan's pride gets the best of him and goes out with the real queen.
20	13	"Roger 'n' Me"	Anthony Lioi	Rick Wiener & Kenny Schwartz	April 23, 2006	2AJN01	7.34
Stan and Roger become best friends in Atlantic City, and Roger absorbs all of Stan's memories, which makes Stan uncomfortable. Meanwhile, Hayley and Steve conspire to break up a good-looking and happy couple so that they can date the two.
21	14	"Helping Handis"	Caleb Meurer	Nahnatchka Khan	April 30, 2006	2AJN02	6.51
After being embarrassed by Hayley's student film about her life as a housewife, Francine decides to become a back-alley surgeon to gain the respect of her daughter. Meanwhile, Steve grows breasts from steroids and becomes popular, while Roger goes insane trying to clean the Smiths' house.
22	15	"With Friends Like Steve's"	John Aoshima	Erik Durbin	May 7, 2006	2AJN03	6.60
After Steve shows a lack of interest in Stan's job, Stan replaces him with Barry, Steve's obese friend, who is in fact malicious when unmedicated, and who plots to replace Steve completely. Meanwhile, Roger becomes a fraternity brother.
23	16	"Tears of a Clooney"	Brent Woods	Chris McKenna & Matt McKenna	May 14, 2006	2AJN04	6.86
Haunted by resentment towards George Clooney, Francine resolves to win his heart so she can break it. However, her plan is sabotaged by Stan, who becomes close friends with Clooney as part of his wife's scheme. Meanwhile, Roger builds a vineyard and starts up a private sweat shop using foster children and Hayley suffers from an unnamed disease.
