= Stannie Get Your Gun =

- American Dad! episode
- Episode no.: Season 2 Episode 7
- Directed by: John Aoshima
- Written by: Brian Boyle
- Production code: 1AJN14
- Original air date: November 20, 2005

Guest appearances
- John Carroll Lynch as Mr. Simms; Beau Bridges as Doctor

Episode chronology
← Previous "Stan of Arabia: Part 2"	Next → "Star Trek"
- American Dad! season 2

"Stannie Get Your Gun" is the seventh episode of the second season and the fourteenth overall episode of the animated comedy series American Dad!. It aired on Fox in the United States on November 20, 2005, and is written by Brian Boyle and directed by John Aoshima.

In the episode, Hayley accidentally paralyzes Stan when she fires a gun she thought was loaded with blanks, while Roger tricks Steve into thinking he is not really his parents' son.

== Plot ==
Francine is tired of Stan and Hayley's constant bickering; in this instance, gun control fuels the debate (Hayley favours it while Stan is against it). Forced by Francine to make amends, Stan takes Hayley to her favorite amusement park, 'Sugar Mountain,' only to reveal on arrival that the park has long since closed. On its site is NGALand, a gun-themed park owned by the NGA (a parody of the NRA). Disgusted at how America encourages kids to take up firearms, Hayley grabs a guitar and sings an anti-gun song, getting her and Stan thrown out and Stan's membership revoked. Stan stages a robbery so that Hayley is forced to use a gun to save the family.

Hayley shoots the robber but feels conflicted afterwards, until she learns it was just a ploy to get her to apologize so Stan can recover his NGA membership. Angry, she grabs Stan's gun and, with what Stan mistakenly tells her are blank rounds, shoots him in the neck, rendering him quadriplegic and reliant on a wheelchair. Feeling hugely guilty, Hayley agrees to help Stan by singing appalling pro-gun songs at NGALand. At the break, Francine sees what the trauma has done to Hayley and inspires Stan to rethink. For the encore, Stan defies the park's management and the pair sing Hayley's anti-gun song instead, sending out the message that guns are bad. The old NGALand mascot, fired because of Stan, uses the opportunity to try to kill Hayley to get his job back, but Stan takes the bullet. In hospital, it is revealed that the second bullet dislodged the first bullet with the result that Stan recovers completely and, much to the appall of Francine and Hayley, believes that "guns heal the sick", once again pro-guns.

Meanwhile, Roger gets angry at Steve for stealing a cookie that Francine had saved for him. Driven mad by Steve's declaration of "you snooze, you lose," he sets out to gain revenge on Steve by convincing him that he was adopted. He begins operating on a small scale by pointing out the minor differences between Steve and his parents. As the show progresses, Roger's tactics become more demented; he even goes so far as to destroy all the photos and videos of Steve as a baby. Steve is eventually convinced that he was adopted, even going so far as to commit incest by French kissing his sister (leaving Hayley traumatized). Roger searches the FBI database looking for a child that fits Steve's profile, and sends him to a couple whose son was kidnapped when he was an infant. Roger insists they are his real parents (and a Norwegian sailing family), and coaxes him into a sailor outfit. Steve greets the family enthusiastically, and they are overjoyed at the return of their "son." When Roger exposes his ploy, Steve, rather than becoming angry, congratulates him on organizing such a clever ruse, much to the horrified couple's disappointment.

As the episode ends in Stan's hospital room, Hayley sits in Roger's seat and declares, "The early bird gets the worm." As before, Roger slowly repeats her words, implying that he is also planning to get revenge on her.

== Reception ==
Ryan Budke of AOL TV gave the episode a mixed review, saying that as usual he was more interested in the subplot, this time involving Roger and Steve: "I just get tired of seeing the ways that Stan and Haley [sic] disagree, it seems like a record skipping to me." Daniel Solomon of Cinema Blend gave the episode a mixed review, calling it "a classic Colbert turnaround on Republican values" in how Stan was paralyzed by a bullet and instead of changing his belief, he used this to promote guns. The episode was watched by a total of 8.19 million people; this made it the third most-watched show on Animation Domination that night, beating King of the Hill but losing to Family Guy and The Simpsons, which had 10.3 million viewers.
