= Honeymoon / Funeral =

Film by Nahnatchka Khan

- Directed by: Nahnatchka Khan
- Written by: Julia Bicknell
- Produced by: Nahnatchka Khan; Jennifer Carreras; Julia Bicknell
- Starring: Rebecca Ferguson; Greta Lee; Carrie Coon
- Production companies: MRC; Fierce Baby
- Distributed by: Black Bear Pictures
- Country: United States
- Language: English

Honeymoon / Funeral is an upcoming American romantic comedy film directed by Nahnatchka Khan based on a script by Julia Bicknell and starring Rebecca Ferguson, Greta Lee, and Carrie Coon.

== Premise ==
Two women meet on a flight from LA to London – one en route to her honeymoon by herself after being left at the altar by her girlfriend, the other headed home for her mother's funeral – and wind up spending the week together.

== Cast ==
- Rebecca Ferguson
- Greta Lee
- Carrie Coon as Sarah

== Production ==
In August 2026, set photos leaked of Rebecca Ferguson and Greta Lee filming a lesbian romantic comedy in London. In a prior July interview with Willem Dafoe, published by Interview magazine, Lee mentioned she was set to travel to London for a new romance film. The following month, Honeymoon / Funeral was confirmed to be in production with Nahnatchka Khan directing a screenplay by Julia Bicknell. That same month, Deadline Hollywood reported that Carrie Coon had joined the cast as Sarah, the ex-fiancée of Lee's character.

== Release ==
FilmNation Entertainment sold the distribution rights to the film at the Toronto International Film Festival in September 2026. In October 2026, Black Bear Pictures acquired North American distribution rights to the film.
