= Laurence Shames =

American writer (born 1951)

- Born: 1951 (age 74–75); Newark, New Jersey, U.S.
- Education: New York University
- Occupation: Writer
- Writing career
- Pen name: Gary Troup
- Website: laurenceshames.com

Laurence Shames (born 1951) is an American writer.

== Writing career ==
Laurence Shames is best known for his series of comic mysteries, all set in Key West, Florida. One of his most popular books, however, Bad Twin, was written under the pseudonym Gary Troup, in a cross promotion between publisher Hyperion Books (now Hachette Books) and ABC, the network which produced the TV series, Lost. In Lost, Troup was a fictional character who was presumed dead in the airline crash that was the basis for the TV series, and he left a manuscript behind, leading viewers of the series to buy the book to find clues to the mysteries of Lost. Shames was the ghostwriter for the bestseller, Boss of Bosses, and was the Ethics columnist for Esquire.

== Personal life ==
Laurence Shames was born in Newark, New Jersey in 1951. He graduated from New York University in 1972. He now lives in Ojai, California.

== Books ==
=== Key West novels ===
- Florida Straits (1992)
- Scavenger Reef (1994)
- Sunburn (1995)
- Tropical Depression (1996)
- Virgin Heat (1996)
- Mangrove Squeeze (1998)
- Welcome to Paradise (1999)
- The Naked Detective (2000)
- Shot on Location (2013)
- Tropical Swap (2014)
- Chickens (short stories) (2014)
- Key West Luck (2015)
- One Strange Date (2017)
- One Big Joke (2018)
- Nacho Unleashed (2019)
- The Paradise Gig (2020)
- Key West Normal (2021)
- Relative Humidity (2023)
- Sunset Bluff (2024)

=== Others ===
- The Big Time: The Harvard Business School's Most Successful Class and How It Shaped America (The Class of 1949) (1986)
- Living Large: A Big Man's Ideas on Weight, Success, and Acceptance (with Michael S. Berman) (2006)
- The Angels' Share (2012)
- Not Fade Away: A Short Life Well Lived (with Peter R. Barton) (2004)
- The Hunger for More: Searching for Values in an Age of Greed (2015)
