= Jesse Q. Sutanto =

Chinese-Indonesian writer

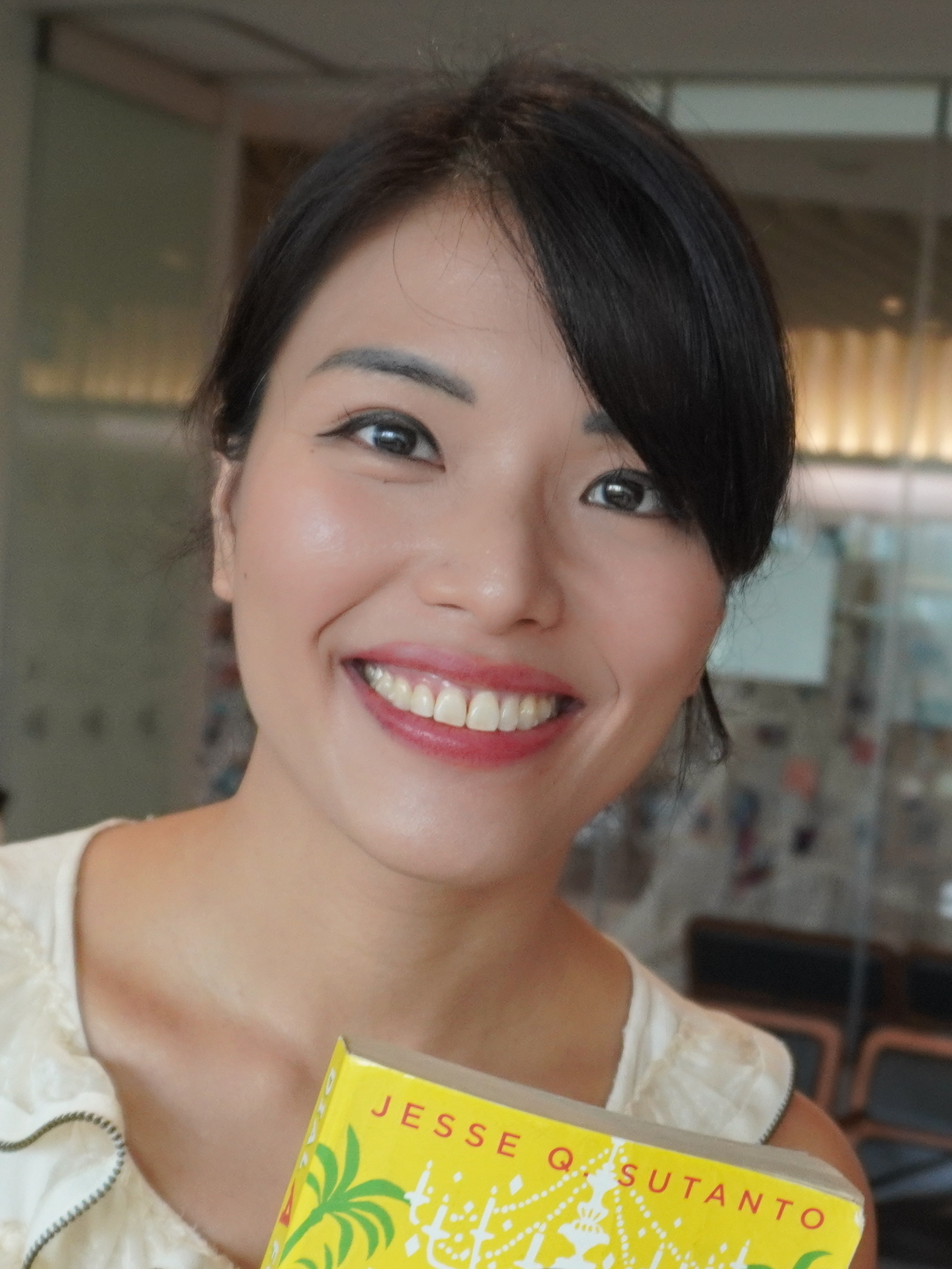
- Education: University of Oxford (MFA, 2009); University of California, Berkeley (BA, 2006)
- Occupation: Author
- Notable work: Dial A for Aunties (2021); Vera Wong's Unsolicited Advice for Murderers (2023)
- Awards: Comedy Women in Print Prize (2021); Edgar for Best Original Paperback (2024)

Jesse Q. Sutanto is a Chinese-Indonesian author. As of 2023, she has published nine novels for adults, young adults, and middle-grade readers. She is most famous for her novels Dial A for Aunties and Vera Wong's Unsolicited Advice for Murderers. Dial A for Aunties won the 2021 Comedy Women in Print Prize and has been optioned for a film by Netflix.

== Personal life ==
Sutanto grew up in a Chinese-Indonesian family, living in Singapore, Indonesia, California, and Oxford. She speaks Mandarin, Indonesian, and English with her family. She currently lives in Jakarta with her husband, who is English, and their two daughters.

== Writing career ==
Sutanto received her MFA in creative writing from Oxford University in 2009 and has been writing ever since. She published her first book in 2021 and as of 2023, has published nine books for readers of all ages.

=== Dial A for Aunties ===
In 2021, Sutanto published her hit novel, Dial A for Aunties. For this book, Sutanto became the first writer of colour to win the United Kingdom's Comedy Women in Print Prize. The novel, which is a blend of romantic comedy and murder mystery, features Chinese-Indonesian culture through the lens of a girl, her mother and three aunts.

In 2020, before Dial A for Aunties was even published, the film rights were bought by Netflix as a result of a bidding war. Nahnatchka Khan and Chloe Yellin will adapt the novel into a film. Khan was set to direct the project. Sutanto will executive produce the film.

=== Vera Wong's Unsolicited Advice for Murderers ===
In 2023, the rights for Vera Wong's Unsolicited Advice for Murderers were acquired by Warner Bros. TV for the production of a series adaptation. Mindy Kaling‘s Kaling International and Oprah Winfrey's Harpo Films are set to produce the project.

== Published works ==
- The Obsession. Sourcebooks, Inc. 2 February 2021. ISBN 978-1-7282-1517-4.
- The New Girl. Sourcebooks, Inc. 1 February 2022. ISBN 978-1-7282-1520-4.
- Well, That Was Unexpected. New York: Delacorte Press. 27 September 2022. ISBN 978-0-593-43399-7.
- I'm Not Done with You Yet. Penguin Group. 16 July 2024. ISBN 978-0-593-54693-2.
- Didn't See That Coming. New York: Delacorte Press. 28 November 2023. ISBN 978-0-593-43403-1.
- Worth Fighting For. Disney Electronic Content. 3 June 2025. ISBN 978-1-368-11481-3.
- You Will Never Be Me. Penguin Group. 7 October 2025. ISBN 978-0-593-54696-3.
- Next Time Will Be Our Turn. Penguin Group. 11 November 2025. ISBN 978-0-593-81687-5.
- Read Between the Lines. Amazon Publishing. 1 February 2026. ISBN 978-1-662-53463-8.
- Ms. Mebel Goes Back to the Chopping Block. Penguin Group. 28 April 2026. ISBN 978-0-593-95305-1.

=== Aunties series ===
- Dial A for Aunties. New York: Penguin. 27 April 2021. ISBN 978-0-593-33304-4.
- Four Aunties and a Wedding. New York, NY: Penguin. 29 March 2022. ISBN 978-0-593-33306-8.
- The Good, the Bad, and the Aunties. New York: Penguin. 26 March 2024. ISBN 978-0-593-54623-9.

=== Vera Wong series ===
- Vera Wong's Unsolicited Advice for Murderers. New York: Penguin. 14 March 2023. ISBN 978-0-593-54618-5.
- Vera Wong's Guide to Snooping (on a Dead Man). New York: Penguin Group. 1 April 2025. ISBN 978-0-593-54625-3.

=== Theo Tan series ===
- Theo Tan and the Fox Spirit. Feiwel & Friends. 31 May 2022. ISBN 978-1-250-79430-7.
- Theo Tan and the Iron Fan. Feiwel & Friends. 27 June 2023. ISBN 978-1-250-79437-6.
