= Stan of Arabia: Part 2 =

- American Dad! episode
- Episode no.: Season 2 Episode 6
- Directed by: Anthony Lioi
- Written by: Carter Bays; Craig Thomas
- Production code: 1AJN13
- Original air date: November 13, 2005

Episode chronology
← Previous "Stan of Arabia: Part 1"	Next → "Stannie Get Your Gun"
- American Dad! season 2

"Stan of Arabia: Part 2" is the sixth episode of the second season and the thirteenth overall episode of the animated comedy series American Dad!. It aired on Fox in the United States on November 13, 2005, and is written by Carter Bays and Craig Thomas and directed by Anthony Lioi.

As the Smiths continue their lives in Saudi Arabia, Stan embraces the hyper-patriarchal society while the rest of the family struggles with the different social norms.

== Plot ==
Stan mediates a dispute between Francine and his new wife. Francine demands that Stan put them on a plane back to the States, but he reminds her that in Saudi Arabia, what the man says goes. Meanwhile, Hayley is cornered by the vice police, but a strange man intervenes and says he's her brother, saving her. And out in the desert, Steve comes to after crashing his Mercedes into an oil derrick. Roger is delivered to his new husband, who is very wealthy. Seeing alcohol flowing freely, Roger no longer minds his servitude. Hayley hits it off with Kazi, who lets it slip that he's in al-Qaeda. She begs him not to blow up the American embassy, then passionately kisses him. Back in Langley, Bullock gets a call from Francine asking him to give Stan his job back. Bullock informs her that he had already made the offer, but Stan turned him down. Steve is wandering through the desert. He prays to God for help, and God, in the form of Angelina Jolie, descends from the heavens. Roger is enjoying his plush life as a concubine when his new husband comes in, ready to consummate the relationship.

Elsewhere, Hayley and Kazi have already consummated theirs. In the bazaar, Francine confronts Stan about Bullock's offer. Stan says his word rules, so Francine breaks into a song about how awful Saudi Arabia is, stripping down into her bra and panties during the number. When she finishes, the moral police arrest her, as one of the rules is that musicals are forbidden. Stan visits Francine in jail, and when he learns that her cellmate has been imprisoned for 23 years for stealing a candy bar, agrees to go to the embassy to get help for Francine.

Meanwhile, Roger tries to avoid relations by telling his husband about the glorious epic, Beverly Hills, 90210. Out in the desert, God tells Steve to stop worrying about becoming a man and advises him to enjoy his childhood as long as possible. Hayley wakes up and finds a note from Kazi waiting for her: he's going through with his plan to attack the U.S. embassy, the same embassy that Stan just walked into. Hayley sprints over.

When she arrives, Hayley finds Kazi working at a Shwarma King stand by the embassy. Other girls laugh at her, saying Kazi tricks all American girls into thinking he's a terrorist. Inside, the consulate tells Stan he can get an American out of jail with no problem; he needs to see Francine's passport. Unfortunately, Stan has already burned all the family's passports. Steve returns from the desert and tells the townspeople he has spoken with God, who gave him a perfect plan to create peace between Israel & Palestine. The townspeople hail Steve as a visionary until he mentions that God is a woman. They can't accept this and decide to kill Steve. At her trial, Francine is sentenced to death by stoning. Stan declares that he won't let Francine die alone; so he gets himself sentenced to death by pretending to be a homosexual.

At the stoning, Steve is buried next to his family after calling God a woman. Hayley's there too after she beat Kazi into a coma. But before the audience can start throwing rocks, President Bush choppers in and declares that democracy has arrived. He throws an American flag through the judge and pulls the Smiths out of the ground as the Saudis celebrate. However, it is revealed that this was all just a fantasy Stan had. The throwers pick up their stones. But the judge gets a call ordering the Smiths released. It turns out that Roger had his husband make the call. The Smiths arrive back on American soil and Stan kisses the ground and performs a musical number about how America is not the worst place in the world. Roger arrives in a suitcase and states, "What happens in Saudi Arabia, stays in Saudi Arabia".

== Production ==
The episode aired on Fox in the United States on November 13, 2005, and was written by Carter Bays and Craig Thomas and directed by Anthony Lioi. In 2006, during an interview with MovieWeb, Mike Barker and Matt Weitzman named it their favorite episode of the season, saying: "You're asking us to pick a favorite... I gotta tell you it really is tough to pick a favorite. I'm really fond of the "Stan of Arabia" two parter. It was actually intended to be a one-hour special when we kind of pitched the idea to the network. They said, "Go for it! We can do that." And then suddenly it's like, "We can't do that. As a one hour it was really nice and pure and clean, and now it's a two-parter but I think it still works really well."

== Reception ==
Ryan Budke of AOL TV gave the episode a positive review, saying "This was a great episode. I'm still thinking this two episode adventure could have been condensed into one, but good none-the-less. I have stared into Angelina Jolie's chest for many an hour before as well. I'm convinced the answers to the universe lie in there. In fact I'm going to go do a little research right now. I'll get back to you guys and let you know what I find." The episode was watched by a total of 7.74 million people; this made it the third-most watched show on Animation Domination that night, behind Family Guy and The Simpsons, which had 11.4 million.

This episode, along with its prequel "Stan of Arabia: Part 1", was banned by the government of Saudi Arabia, who claimed it was "promoting Islamophobia and anti-Arabism".
