= Bruce DeSilva =

American novelist

- Born: Taunton, Massachusetts, U.S.
- Citizenship: US
- Occupations: Author; journalist
- Spouse: Patricia Smith
- Writing career
- Language: English
- Genre: Detective fiction
- Notable awards: Macavity Award (2011); Edgar Award (2011)
- Website: www.brucedesilva.com

Bruce DeSilva (born in Taunton, Massachusetts) is an American author and journalist.

== Career ==
DeSilva was a journalist for forty years, and has reviewed books for The New York Times.

As an author, DeSilva is best known for the Liam Mulligan series of mystery novels, including Rogue Island, Cliff Walk, Providence Rag, A Scourge of Vipers and The Dread Line. His novels won him the Edgar Award, Macavity Award.

== Personal life ==
DeSilva is married to Patricia Smith, a poet. DeSilva lives in New Jersey.

== Books in order ==
1. Rogue Island
2. Cliff Walk
3. Providence Rag
4. A Scourge of Vipers
5. The Dread Line
