= Chris Ewan =

British crime and mystery writer

Chris Ewan (born 6 October 1976), also credited as C.M. Ewan, is a British crime and mystery writer. He is best known for his Good Thief series of travelling adventures featuring Charlie Howard, a thief and author of his own crime series.

== Early and personal life ==
Ewan was born in Taunton, Somerset, and lived on the Isle of Man with his family before moving back to Somerset. Ewan studied American Literature at the University of Nottingham.

== Career ==
He is published by Simon & Schuster and Faber and Faber in the UK, and St. Martin's Press in the United States. His first novel, The Good Thief's Guide to Amsterdam (2007), won the Long Barn Books First Novel Award. His first and second novels, The Good Thief's Guide to Amsterdam and The Good Thief's Guide to Paris, were shortlisted for the Last Laugh Award for best comic crime fiction. The audiobook of The Good Thief's Guide to Vegas, read by Simon Vance, was nominated for an Audie Award in 2013.

Ewan's thriller Safe House, set on the Isle of Man, has sold over 500,000 copies and was shortlisted for the Theakston's Old Peculier Crime Novel of the Year.

== Adaptations ==
An adaptation of The Good Thief's Guide book series was in development by 20th Century Fox Studios for ABC in 2013.

Eleventh Hour Films optioned the rights to adapt The House Hunt for television. In 2024, Victoria Asare-Archer was attached to write the limited series.

== Bibliography ==
=== The Good Thief's Guide ===
- The Good Thief's Guide to Amsterdam (2007)
- The Good Thief's Guide to Paris (2009)
- The Good Thief's Guide to Vegas (2010)
- The Good Thief's Guide to Venice (2011)
- The Good Thief's Guide to Berlin (2013)
- The Good Thief's Guide to Murder (2017)
- The Good Thief's Guide to Christmas (2021)

=== Standalone ===
- Safe House (2011)
- Dead Line (2013)
- Dark Tides (2015)
- Long Time Lost (2016)
- A Window Breaks (2020)
- The Interview (2022)
- The House Hunt (2023)
- Strangers in the Car (2025)
- Eye Spy (2026)
