= Nahnatchka Khan =

American television writer and producer

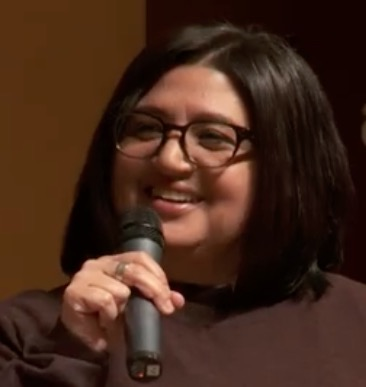
- Khan at the San Francisco Public Library in 2019
- Born: Las Vegas, Nevada, U.S.
- Occupations: Television writer, producer
- Years active: 1997–present
- Relatives: Nick Khan (brother)

Nahnatchka Khan (born c. 1973) is an American television writer and producer. She created and executive produced the ABC comedy series Don't Trust the B— in Apartment 23 (2012–2013) and Fresh Off the Boat (2015–2020), the NBC comedy series Young Rock (2021–2023), and developed the Peacock series Laid. She also directed the streaming films Always Be My Maybe (2019) and Totally Killer (2023). She was a writer on American Dad!

== Early life ==
Khan's parents immigrated to the United States from Iran. She was born in Las Vegas and grew up in Hawaii. She attended the University of Southern California's School of Cinematic Arts. While in college, she interned at National Lampoon and Fox.

== Career ==
Khan started her writing career on 20th Century Fox's Malcolm in the Middle. She also worked for Disney Television Animation, including Disney's 1990s animated sitcom, Pepper Ann, the division's first series created by a woman. According to Khan, Pepper Ann's "Sue Rose wanted to do this show about this 12-year-old girl raised by a single mom and who had this really active fantasy life," something that had not been done before. Khan also worked on American Dad! and on the children's series Unfabulous.

In 2012, Khan created the ABC comedy series Don't Trust the B— in Apartment 23. The series debuted on April 11, 2012, and ran for two seasons until January 15, 2013.

In 2015, Khan created the TV show Fresh Off the Boat which also aired on ABC. The show was lauded for being "the first network sitcom to feature an Asian family since 1994's All-American Girl." Khan was honored for her contributions to the Asian Pacific American community, specifically through this show, by East West Players during their 50th Anniversary Visionary Awards Dinner & Silent Auction. The series ran for six seasons and concluded on February 21, 2020.

In 2016, Khan signed a multiyear deal to create, write, develop, and supervise projects for Twentieth Century Fox, under her company, Fierce Baby Productions. As of 2013, she had a television pilot in development titled Fatrick, slated to star Zach Cregger, with Fox.

In 2018, it was announced that Khan would make her directorial debut with Always Be My Maybe which was released on Netflix in May 2019. The film went on to be positively received. On Rotten Tomatoes the film has an approval rating of 89% based on 94 reviews, with an average rating of 7.00/10. The site's critical consensus reads, "Carried by the infectious charms of Ali Wong and Randall Park, Always Be My Maybe takes familiar rom-com beats and cleverly layers in smart social commentary to find its own sweet groove."

In 2020, Netflix won the rights to Jesse Q. Sutanto's book, Dial A for Aunties, which they announced will be produced and directed by Khan.

In 2021, she co-created the series Young Rock with Jeff Chiang which premiered on NBC on February 16, 2021. The series has received generally positive reviews from critics. The series ran for three seasons and a 2021 holiday special.

In 2023, Khan directed the Prime Video film Totally Killer. She is currently filming Honeymoon / Funeral in London.

== Themes ==
As an Iranian-American, Khan remembered growing up with few representations of herself on television. "There was really no representation of any Middle Eastern culture, so [for me and my brother] growing up, our hero was Iron Sheik—a character in WWF wrestling…. He was from Iran, and he was always the underdog to, like, Hulk Hogan. Everybody was booing, but we were super cheering for him!" Like many women in the television industry, Khan reported feeling "pigeon-holed" as a writer. "I was the only woman in the room a lot of times, so I felt like people looked at me for the wife joke or the daughter joke," she said. "For me it was just the female voice."

From the beginning of her career, Khan has created diverse images that work to subvert television stereotypes. She is best known for creating the ABC sitcoms Don't Trust the B— in Apartment 23 and Fresh Off the Boat. Fresh Off the Boat, based on restaurateur Eddie Huang's memoir, made television history by centering the experiences of a Taiwanese-American family in Florida. One critic commented on its additional significance that, "It was the first show to feature an Asian American cast since All American Girl in 1994. In at least one show, Asian-Americans would not be desexualized, hypersexualized, caricatured or stereotyped."

A lesbian herself, Khan routinely features queer themes in Fresh Off the Boat: Eddie's mom, Jessica (Constance Wu), regularly visits the local lesbian bar, The Denim Turtle. Eddie's former love interest, Nicole, struggles to come out to her father and family.

== Personal life ==
Khan's brother, Nick Khan, is the president and co-CEO of WWE.

== Filmography ==
Film

Year	Title	Director	Producer
2019	Always Be My Maybe	Yes	No
2023	Totally Killer	Yes	Executive
TBA	Honeymoon / Funeral †	Yes	Yes

Television

Year	Title	Director	Writer	Executive producer	Producer	Creator	Notes
1997	Recess	No	Yes	No	No	No	Episode "To Finster, with Love"
1997–2001	Pepper Ann	No	Yes	Yes	Yes	No	Wrote 15 episodes
2001	Undergrads	No	Yes	No	No	No	2 episodes
2002–2003	Malcolm in the Middle	No	Staff	No	No	No	Episode "If Boys Were Girls"
2003	What I Like About You	No	Yes	No	No	No	Episode "The Fix Up"
2003–2004	Good Morning, Miami	No	Yes	No	No	No	2 episodes
2003–2005	What's New, Scooby-Doo?	No	Yes	No	No	No	2 episodes
2004–2007	Unfabulous	No	Yes	No	Consulting	No	5 episodes
2005–2011	American Dad!	No	Yes	Yes	Yes	No	Wrote 10 episodes
2012–2013	Don't Trust the B— in Apartment 23	Yes	Yes	Yes	No	Yes	3 episodes (writer); 1 episode (director)
2015–2020	Fresh Off the Boat	Yes	Yes	Yes	No	Yes	4 episodes (writer); 2 episodes (director)
2021–2023	Young Rock	Yes	Yes	Yes	No	Yes	5 episodes (writer); 4 episodes (director)
2022	Ali Wong: Don Wong	Yes	No	No	No	No	Stand-up comedy special
2024	Laid	Yes	Yes	Yes	No	Yes	3 episodes (writer); 6 episodes (director)
