= List of You're Under Arrest characters =

Some of the police officers at Bokuto Station. From left to right, upper area: Yoriko Nikaido, Transgender Police Officer Aoi Futaba and New Rookie Saori Saga. From left to right, bottom area: Police Officer Ken Nakajima, Police Officer Miyuki Kobayakawa, Police Officer Natsumi Tsujimoto and Off Duty Chief Officer Shōji Tokairin.

The Japanese manga series You're Under Arrest features a cast of characters by Kōsuke Fujishima. The series centers around two female police officers of contrasting personalities and their activities at Bokuto Station.

== Main characters ==
=== Natsumi Tsujimoto ===
Natsumi Tsujimoto
- You're Under Arrest character
- First appearance: You're Under Arrest OVA, Episode 1
- Created by: Kōsuke Fujishima
- Voiced by: Japanese; Sakiko Tamagawa; English; Tamara Burnham Mercer
- Portrayed by: Misaki Ito

In-universe information
- Alias: Home-Run Woman
- Occupation: Tokyo Metropolitan Police Department officer
- Relatives: Kazuhiro Tsujimoto (Father); Hiromi Tsujimoto (Mother)
- Home: Okayama Prefecture
- Nationality: Japanese

The voice of Natsumi Tsujimoto (辻本 夏実, Tsujimoto Natsumi) was provided by Sakiko Tamagawa and her English voice by Tamara Burnham Mercer. In the live action version, she was portrayed by actress Misaki Ito.

==== Fictional biography ====
Natsumi is an officer stationed at the fictional Bokuto Station in Tokyo's Sumida Ward. She is very outgoing as well as very laid back. She often demonstrates superhuman strength second only to Shoji Tokairin and is a motorcycle enthusiast, capable of high-risk maneuvers on both bikes and mopeds. Natsumi has a prodigious appetite for food and alcohol, and has been known to show up at work with a hangover. She is also a chronic late sleeper. Despite having many bad habits, she is a very capable police officer and does her job seriously when needed. She keeps a mini-moped, a Honda Motocompo (JR-2) in Miyuki's Honda Today squad car and uses it when a flanking strategy is required. It is prominently labeled "NATSUMI" (in the Nihon-shiki transliteration system) before her first day at Bokuto in the beginning of the first anime, later re-coloured and re-labeled "POLICE" in the later appearances and on the Bandai Model kit of the Honda Today. When off-duty, she operates a Yamaha RZV motorbike until it is damaged beyond repair during later part of the first season. She is subsequently tricked into buying a Subaru R-2, which is in a near-non-functioning state. This car is then thoroughly renovated and heavily modified by Miyuki into a patrol car. She uses the wrecked motorbike's engine, modifying the car to make its operation follow closely to that of a motorbike. In the manga version, this car operates with double engines.

Natsumi is also familiar with judo and kendo, being able to defeat her opponents during training sessions. Her strength and her familiarity with hand-to-hand combat complement Miyuki's brilliant mind in creating devices or modifying known vehicles very well, making her and Miyuki famous throughout Bokuto Station. She is also the only person in this series able to consistently defeat Strikeman's fastballs and is called Home-Run Girl by Strikeman for this very reason.

==== History ====
According to the information in the You're Under Arrest series, Natsumi was born on August 12, 1975. Not much information is revealed in the story, though she had lived in Asakusa before enrolling in the Metropolitan Police Department Academy and became classmates with Miyuki Kobayakawa before being dispatched elsewhere in the Greater Tokyo Area.

The two eventually met by accident when Natsumi was late for work during her first day on duty with the Bokuto Station. She was partnered with Miyuki for a number of years. But for a short time, Natsumi was scouted by Tokyo Metropolitan Police Department Headquarters to be part of a prototype female motorbike unit before declining an invitation to train further with them. She was known to be infatuated with Detective Tokuno and the Kachou of the Traffic Division before meeting Shoji Tokairin, who became her rival and love interest. Natsumi and Miyuki, later on in the series, broke the back of a car smuggling syndicate that operated by stealing luxury vehicles, leading to the group's disbanding. Due to her actions, Assistant Kaoruko Kinoshita moved her to the Tokyo Metropolitan Police Department with Miyuki as part of her specialized training program in enhancing officer's skills related to police work. During the Hachi-Ichi-Go crisis (Bee Number One in the dub of You're Under Arrest: The Movie), she and Miyuki proved themselves as law enforcers when they apprehended renegade police officer Tadashi Emoto as he tried to commit suicide by trying to jump from the top floors of the Tokyo Tower. She was also sent to Los Angeles in the United States with Miyuki as part of a foreign officer exchange program with the Los Angeles Police Department.

At the end of the series, Natsumi is recruited to serve in the Special Assault Team and was an operative stationed with the Tokyo Metropolitan Police Department branch. Her partnership with Miyuki and subsequent transfer to the Special Assault Team had then ended nearly on bad terms, almost destroying their friendship until coming to terms with reality. She was replaced in Bokuto Station by Saori Saga, an ex-student who she and Miyuki saved during her police officer days before Saori was dispatched to the said station.

She had been temporarily been at Bokuto again before being transferred out to be trained under the JGSDF's Ranger Platoon before being reassigned again to Bokuto Station, serving as Miyuki's partner again after Saori had left Bokuto to be relocated in another station.

==== Reception ====
A character that is parodied after Natsumi is shown in the first episode of Full Metal Panic? Fumoffu. She is depicted as a wild policewoman who chases the two main character in a police car. Though, in YUA, Miyuki is the car driver of the duo, not Natsumi.

=== Miyuki Kobayakawa ===
Miyuki Kobayakawa
- You're Under Arrest character
- Miyuki Kobayakawa
- First appearance: You're Under Arrest OVA, Episode 1
- Created by: Kōsuke Fujishima
- Voiced by: Japanese; Akiko Hiramatsu; English; Juliet Cesario; Jo Ann Luzzatto (OVA); Filipino; Kathyin Masilungan; Spanish; Susana Damas; Alicia Laorden (OVA); Rosario Zamora (Latin America); French; Laurence Sacquet, Marie-Madeleine Le Doze-Burguet (OVA), Brigitte Aubry (film); Italian; Emanuela Amato
- Portrayed by: Sachie Hara

In-universe information
- Occupation: Tokyo Metropolitan Police Department officer
- Home: Okayama Prefecture
- Nationality: Japanese

The voice of Miyuki Kobayakawa (小早川 美幸, Kobayakawa Miyuki) was provided by Akiko Hiramatsu (Japanese), and Jo Ann Luzzatto (English; OVA) & Juliet Cesario (English; onward) (Filipino) Kathyin Masilungan. In the live action version, she was portrayed by actress Sachie Hara.

==== Fictional biography ====
Miyuki is Natsumi's partner and roommate. Miyuki is not as physically challenging as Natsumi, but she is much more thoughtful and more polite. A technical genius, Miyuki frequently performs custom vehicle modifications for various people at the precinct and is an expert with computers. Miyuki is a superb driver, almost as daring as Natsumi, and very difficult to shake in a pursuit. She is also punctual, shy, and diligent – in contrast, Natsumi is tardy, bold, and frequently lazy. Her mini patrol car, a Honda Today, is a heavily modified version for patrol duties. Starting with Today's 545 cc EH engine, Miyuki has stroked it out to 600 cc and turbocharged as well as converted to DOHC. Later she swaps the engine to a 700 cc stroked version of the later 656 cc MTREC engine (although still having a yellow number plate for K-cars), also with twin cams, a turbocharger, an intercooler, and nitrous oxide boost. She also has a blue Toyota Sports 800 as her car.

Unlike Natsumi's infatuation towards the chief (Kachou) of Traffic Division, Miyuki admires and respects him because of his dedication in working with the division. During situations where force was the only solution, Miyuki uses airsoft guns with paintball bullets in order to incapacitate or to leave a homing beacon on the opponents. Her love interest happens to be with the "White Hawk" Ken Nakajima but has initial difficulty in telling him until the end of the series. Her feelings for Ken were driven to the point when she pointed an air gun on Natsumi's head when she joked that she would have to marry Ken in the future.

Miyuki is fearful of anything that cannot be explained by science, such as the paranormal, supernatural or anything that was similar to science fiction. She is also afraid of reptiles.

Her character design was also used as the template for a goddess whom the characters prayed to in a four panel gag strip added to a version of YUA who eventually became Belldandy when the strip proved popular and was developed into Oh! My Goddess.

==== History ====
According to the information in the You're Under Arrest series, Miyuki was born on April 7, 1976. She had previously lived in the Okayama Prefecture before moving to the Greater Tokyo Area and entered the Metropolitan Police Department Academy and was classmates with Natsumi Tsujimoto before being transferred to Bokuto Station. She resides currently in Kōtō, Tokyo alongside Natsumi.

When she was trying to pick up Natsumi, she met with her instead by luck when seeing her breaking some of traffic violation rules (to the point that her driving license could end up being suspended by the sheer amount of violations committed, with several of them being even punishable by jail time) but she knew at once that she's Natsumi, her partner to be. Eventually catching up with her, Miyuki made a first impression with her and after Natsumi's transfer to Bokuto Station was complete, Miyuki and Natsumi became partners in the station's Traffic Division. The two became famous with Miyuki's brains and Natsumi's fists in solving various cases involving either themselves or with their colleagues. Miyuki was the other half of the duo responsible for ground breaking work in dismantling a mysterious car smuggling syndicate operation in Tokyo, resulting in her subsequent transfer to the Tokyo Metropolitan Police Department's Criminal Investigation Bureau under its Scientific Investigations Laboratory. The Lab invited her to permanently transfer to the department, but she refused the offer.

In the Hachi-Ichi-Go (蜂一号) crisis (Bee Number One in the dub of You're Under Arrest: The Movie), Miyuki's expertise in computers and in electronics have managed to gain breakwork during initial investigations over the mysterious power outages in the Sumida Ward, but was not able to secure any details regarding them. Nearing the end of the movie, she and Natsumi apprehend renegade officer Tadashi Emoto after wounding Kachou as a means of "proving" that he acted alone throughout the crisis. Miyuki was sent to Los Angeles with Natsumi as part of a foreign police officer exchange program for a short time with the Los Angeles Police Department.

Nearing the end of the series, Miyuki nearly broke her friendship with Natsumi after learning that the latter was being recruited into the Special Assault Team. The two patched up their differences when Miyuki told Natsumi that she wasn't open enough for her to accept Natsumi's recruitment into the SAT since the two had acted like real friends, even like sisters when Miyuki explained that Natsumi's SAT recruitment happened so fast without her realizing it all along, which forced her to shield herself from seeing reality as it was. Miyuki also renewed her "friendship" with Nakajima, further opening their relationship to other possibilities.

Her partner is Saori Saga, who took over Natsumi's position after she was permanently stationed in the Tokyo Metropolitan Police Department branch as part of her duties as an SAT operative before being transferred to the United States to conduct forensic training.

==== Reception ====
Miyuki was among the Top 10 Most Popular Female Characters in the August 2001 issue of Newtype magazine.

=== Ken Nakajima ===
Voiced by: Bin Shimada (Japanese); Marc Matney (English) Ken Nakajima (中嶋 剣, Nakajima Ken) is a motorcycle patrol officer portrayed in the live action by actor Kazushige Nagashima.

=== Teizō Saejima ===
Voiced by: Yasumoto Hiroki Season 3 Full Throttle. Teizō Saejima (鮫島 逓増, Samejima Teizō) A Police Motorcycle Rider member with a scratch on his forehead Working with Police Officer Police Officer Ken Nakajima. Although there was no name, it is one of the few general officers inherited from the original.

=== Yoriko Nikaidō ===
Voiced by: Etsuko Kozakura (Japanese); Pamela Weidner (English) Yoriko Nikaidou (二階堂 頼子, Nikaidō Yoriko) is a dispatcher at Bokuto Station portrayed in the live action by actress Otoha.

=== Futaba Aoi ===
Voiced by: Rica Matsumoto (Japanese); Amy Tipton (English)

Futaba Aoi (葵 双葉, Aoi Futaba) is a transgender woman officer.

=== Saori Saga ===
Saori Saga (佐賀 沙織, Saga Saori) Voiced by: Sakura Tange (Japanese) Mayumi Iizuka (2nd Season Fast & Furious & Season 3 Full Throttle ) (Japanese), Megan Hancock (English) Saori Saga kun is 18 year old Middle High School Student & she has a sibling sister 17 year old Sayōfuka Saga.

=== Kaori Takano ===
Voiced by: Haruka Tomatsu Debut in the Final Season 3 Full Throttle New comer recruit Station in Bokutō Police Headquarter.

=== Sakura Fujieda ===
Sakura Fujieda (藤枝 櫻, Fujieda Sakura) Voice by: Kana Hanazawa Debut in the Final Season 3 Full Throttle New comer Recruit Station in Bokutō Police Headquarter.

=== Chief ===
Voiced by: Issei Masamune (Japanese); Dave Underwood (English)

== Secondary characters ==
=== Officers ===
==== Takao Arizuka ====
Voiced by: Takeshi Watabe (Japanese); Andrew Masset (English)

(蟻塚 貴男 Arizuka Takao) Is an (警視 Keishisei), he is feared by low-ranking officers since his mere presence in a police station during inspection would mean the end of someone's career as he always bring a notebook with him.

==== Kaoruko Kinoshita ====
Voiced by: Yoshiko Sakakibara (Japanese); Shiela Brothers (English)

(木下 薫子 Kinoshita Kaoruko) Is an (警部補 Keibuho) Assistant Inspector serving in Chiyoda Police Headquarter & Sumida Bokutō Police Station in the last three season 1, The Movie Theatrical and season 2 fast and furious During the course of her career, Kaoruko had participated in at least one Tokyo Metropolitan Police Department Color Guard parade. Unit in 2008 she did not appeared in Season Three Full Throttle.

==== Chie Sagamiōno ====
Voiced by: Michiko Neya (Japanese); Courtney Wright (English) Sagamionō Chie (相模大野 千恵, Chie Sagamiōno)

==== Shouji Tōkairin ====
Voiced by: Tomokazu Seki (Japanese); Cullen Moss (English) Is a (巡査長 Junsachō) Chief Police Officer.

Serving in Toyama Prefecture Police Mountain and he serve in Bokutō Police Station.

==== Inspector Tokuno ====
Voiced by: Ikuya Sawaki (Japanese); Joe Gallison (English)

==== Nobuyuki Sugihara ====
Nobuyuki Sugihara (杉原 信行, Sugihara Nobuyuki) Voiced by: Takehiro Murozono (Season 1) & Masaki Aizawa (The movie, Fast & Furious Season 2 & Full Throttle Season 3)

==== Shunsuke Okabayashi ====
Shunsuke Okabayashi (岡林 俊介, Okabayashi Shunsuke)

Shunsuke is played by actor Noboru Kaneko.

=== Civilians ===
==== Daimaru Nakajima ====
Voiced by: Takeshi Aono (Japanese); Marc Matney (English)

==== Sena Wakabayashi ====
Voiced by: Hiroko Konishi (1st Season)/Fumiko Orikasa (2nd Season) (Japanese), Ashley McDaid (English)

==== Boxy ====
Boxy (ボクシー, Bokushī) Voiced by: Ken'ichi Ogata

==== Strikeman ====
Voiced by: Hideyuki Hori (Japanese); Jason Hatfield (English)

==== 50 C.C. Old Lady ====
Voiced by: Kujira

==== Yūji Katsui ====
Voiced by: Okano Kōsuke

Yūji Katsui (勝井祐二, Katsui Yūji)

==== Saki Abdusha ====
Voiced by: Akira Ishida. Season 1 Episode 22 Yoriko Nikaidō's Day Off. Saki Abdusha (サキ アブドゥシャ, Abudo~usha Saki)

Prince of Middle East was exile to Japan order by Section Chief or Kachō.

==== Randy Hammond ====
Voiced by: Kumiko Watanabe

Randy Hammond (ランディハモンド, Randy Hammond)

== Cast ==
OVA series
| Character | | Japanese | English |
Principal cast
| Natsumi Tsujimoto | | Sakiko Tamagawa | Tamara Burnham-Mercer |
| Miyuki Kobyakawa | | Akiko Hiramatsu | Joann Luzzatto |
| Ken Nakajima | | Bin Shimada | Marc Matney |
| Yoriko Nikaido | | Etsuko Kozakura | Pamela Weidner-Houle |
| Chief | | Issei Masamune | Dave Underwood |
| Oshou | | Kinryuu Arimoto | Michael S. Way |
Episodic cast
| 2 | Lancia Man | Takashi Matsuyama | Richard Pennington |
| 2 | Kids | | Glenn Gattis John Houle Lisa Marie Gattis Tommy Cole |
| 2 | Male Announcer | | H. Richard Williams |
| 2 | Female Announcer | | Cierra Atakkaan |
| 3 | Kido | Tatsuya Okada | Robin Robertson |
| 3 | Hiroko | Hiromi Itou | Belinda Bizic-Keller |
| 3 | Satomi | Megumi Hirosawa | Amy Anderson |
| 3 | Fumie | Michie Hase | Stephanie Griffin |
| 3 | Minako | Chiharu Nakamura | Lisa Michaels |
| 4 | Sakai | Yuuko Nagashima | Amy Anderson |
| 4 | Instructor | Takashi Matsuyama | Scott Bailey |
| 4 | Chief of Police | | Norm Shore |
| 4 | Toasted Biker | | John Jeter |
| 4 | Yuuta | | John Houle |
| 4 | Maho | | Karly Cofec |
| 4 | Shou | | Justin Young |
| 4 | B-kun | | Caylan McKay |
| 4 | C-chan | | Chelsea Busch |
