= Juliet Cesario =

American actress

- Born: 1967 (age 58–59); Phoenix, Arizona, U.S.
- Education: University of Findlay
- Occupation: Actress
- Spouses: Scott Simpson (m. 1995; div. 2009) T. Scott Leuenberger (m. 2015; died 2022)
- Website: julietcesario.com/home

Juliet Cesario (born 1967) is an American actress best known for her voice work in anime, Miyuki Kobayakawa in You're Under Arrest, Belldandy in Oh! My Goddess the OVA series, Peorth in the 2nd season TV series Ah! My Goddess: Flights of Fancy, and Nokoru Imonoyama in Clamp School Detectives. Cesario has also appeared in many television series, films, and stage productions.

== Biography ==
Cesario has attended several anime conventions, including Otakon in 1997 and 1998, and Ohayocon and JACON in 2003, and Animazement in 2007. She has also made appearances in many television shows and films. She has previously worked with Coastal Studios for voice overs.

Cesario is now currently active as an actress in television, film, and animation. She starred in a television movie called What you Want that aired on YTV in September 2008. She can be seen in Surface, One Tree Hill, among many other TV shows and movies including Star Trek: The Next Generation.

== Filmography ==
=== Television ===
- American Gothic - Gail's Mother ("Dammed if You Don't")
- Dawson's Creek - Assistant ("The Kiss")
- One Tree Hill - Birth Mom, Bustier Woman, Waitress
- Star Trek: The Next Generation - Lt. Baji
- Surface - ICU Nurse ("Ep. 1.10")
- Will & Grace - Jeanette ("Bi-Plane"), Cashier ("Jack's Big Gay Wedding")
- Zombies VS. Ninjas: The Web Series - Juliet ("Doppelgangrene")

=== Film ===
- Bruno - Nurse #2
- House Arrest - Zooey D (Short film, voice)
- The Kicker - Protester VO
- #lifegoals - Woman
- Little Red Wagon - Dana Philp
- Maggie Tales - Maggie (Short film, voice)
- Our Almost Completely True Story - Myna Bird Lady
- Starbucks Lovers - Susan (Short film)
- Yucatán - Additional Voices (English dub)

== Dubbing roles ==
=== Anime ===
- A.D. Police Files - Iris Cara
- Ah! My Goddess: Flights of Fancy - Peorth
- Blue Submarine No.6 - Mutio, Villagers (ep. 4)
- Clamp School Detectives - Nokoru Imonoyama
- Crusher Joe - Alfin
- Earthian - Takako
- Elf Princess Rane - Rane
- Kageki Shojo!! - Mirei Nohara
- Oh My Goddess! - Belldandy
- Princess Rouge: Legend of the Last Labyrinth - Rouge
- Shinesman - Hitomi Kasahara
- The Special Duty Combat Unit Shinesman - Lafure
- Virtua Fighter - Sarah Bryant
- Voogie's Angel - Shiori Tachibana
- You're Under Arrest - Miyuki Kobayakawa
- You're Under Arrest Specials - Miyuki Kobayakawa

=== Anime Film ===
- Crusher Joe: The Movie - Alfin
- You're Under Arrest: The Motion Picture - Miyuki Kobayakawa
