= NCZ =

NCZ can refer to:

- Brazilian cruzado novo, the currency of Brazil from 1986 to 1989 (symbol: NCz or NCz$)
- Natchez language, an indigenous language spoken in parts of the south eastern United States (ISO 639-3: ncz)
- Natural Conservation Zone, a protected area designation in Haryana, India. See Forests Department, Haryana § Legal framework - Natural Conservation Zones (NCZs)
- NCZ Commodities, a trading firm founded by Victor Niederhoffer
- Novácke chemické závody, a Slovak chemical firm acquired by Via Chem Group in 2012.

== See also ==
- Honda NCZ 50 Motocompo, a folding scooter sold by Honda in the 1980s
- Zarafshan NCZ, a football team that competed in the 2011 Uzbekistan Cup
