= Honda Motocompo =

Folding scooter

Honda NCZ 50 Motocompo
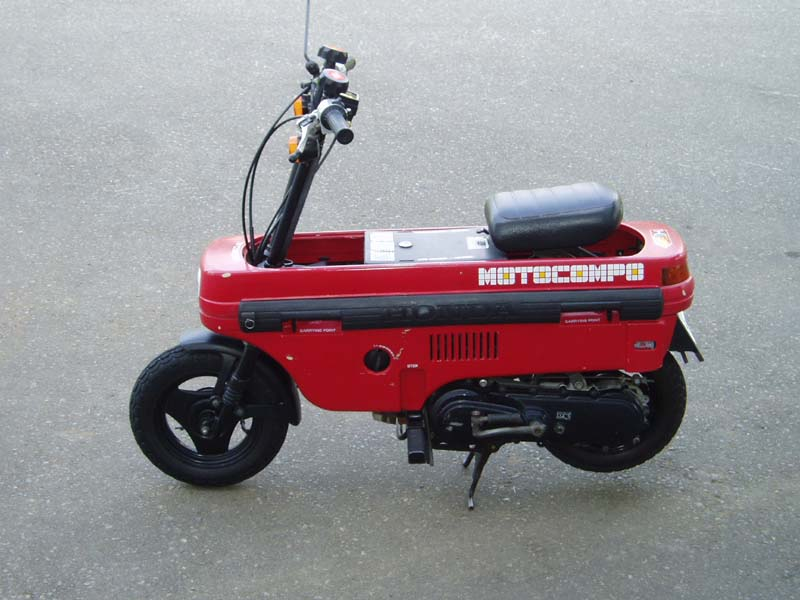
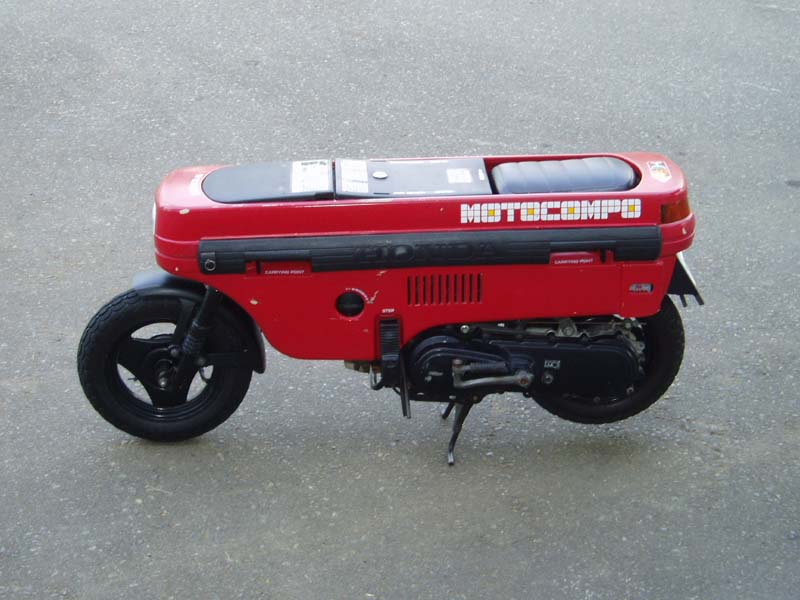
- A Honda Motocompo in deployed (top) and stowed/folded (bottom) configurations.
- Manufacturer: Honda
- Also called: AB12, Trunk Bike
- Production: 1981–1983
- Successor: Honda Motocompacto
- Engine: AB12E 49 cc (3.0 cu in), air-cooled, two-stroke, single
- Power: 2.5 hp (1.9 kW) @ 5,000 rpm
- Torque: 3.7 N⋅m (2.7 lb⋅ft) @ 4,500rpm
- Transmission: single-speed, automatic clutch
- Tires: 2.50-8-4PR
- Dimensions: L: 1.185 m (46.7 in); W: 0.535 m (21.1 in); H: 0.910 m (35.8 in)
- Weight: 42 kg (93 lb) (dry); 45 kg (99 lb) (wet)
- Fuel capacity: 2.2 L (0.48 imp gal; 0.58 US gal)
- Oil capacity: 1.0 L (0.22 imp gal; 0.26 US gal)
- Fuel consumption: 70.0 km/L @ 30km/h
- Turning radius: 1.3 m

The Honda Motocompo is a folding scooter sold by Honda between 1981 and 1983 as a factory add-on only in Japan. It was the smallest scooter ever produced by Honda and it folded into a rectangle for easy storage.

== History ==
Released in Shetland White, Daisy Yellow and Caribbean Red variants, the Motocompo was introduced as a "trunk bike" (トランクバイク / トラバイ, toranku baiku / tora-bai) to fit inside subcompact cars like the Honda Today and the (then new) Honda City; it was inspired from the World War II-era British Welbike folding motorcycle. The City's baggage compartment was specifically developed around the Motocompo, which was sold as a factory add-on and not sold separately. The handlebars, seat, and foot-pegs fold into the scooter's rectangular plastic body to present a clean, box-shaped package of 1,185 mm × 240 mm × 540 mm (46.7 in × 9.4 in × 21.3 in). It is the smallest scooter ever built by Honda. The company's initial monthly sales projection for the domestic market was 8,000 City and 10,000 Motocompo. The City surpassed its targets, but in all only 53,369 Motocompos were sold by the end of production in 1983 (no more than 3,000 per month). The scooter was marketed in conjunction with the City in television ads featuring British ska/2-tone band Madness.

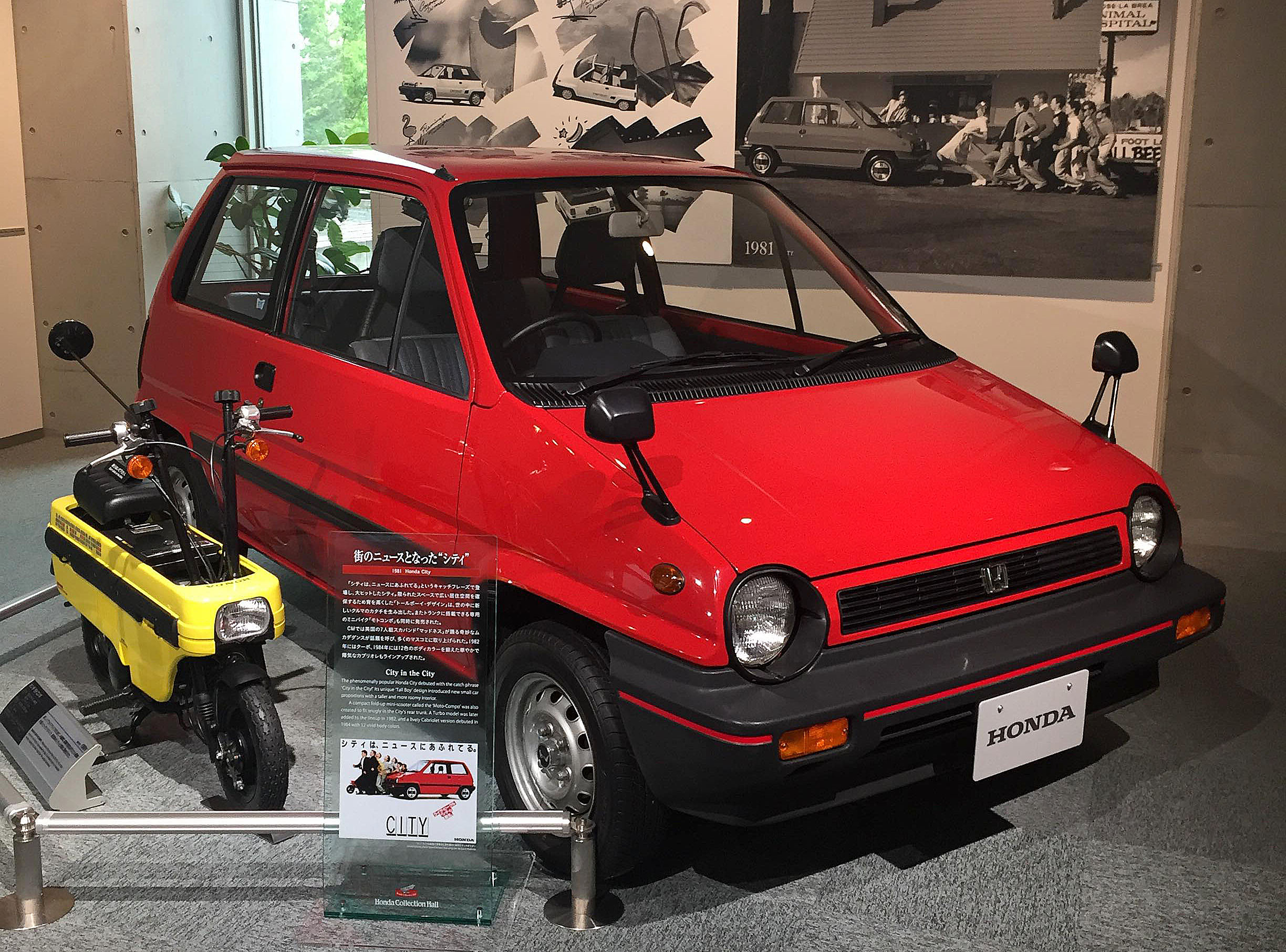
Honda City and Motocompo display at Honda Collection Hall in Motegi

Although discontinued in 1983, Honda has revisited the idea since with several concept vehicles such as the 2001 e-Dax and e-NSR, and the 2011 Motor Compo electric scooter.

On September 14, 2023, Honda announced the Motocompacto, an all-electric successor to the Motocompo, with a release date of November 2023 and an MSRP of $995 at Honda and Acura dealerships.

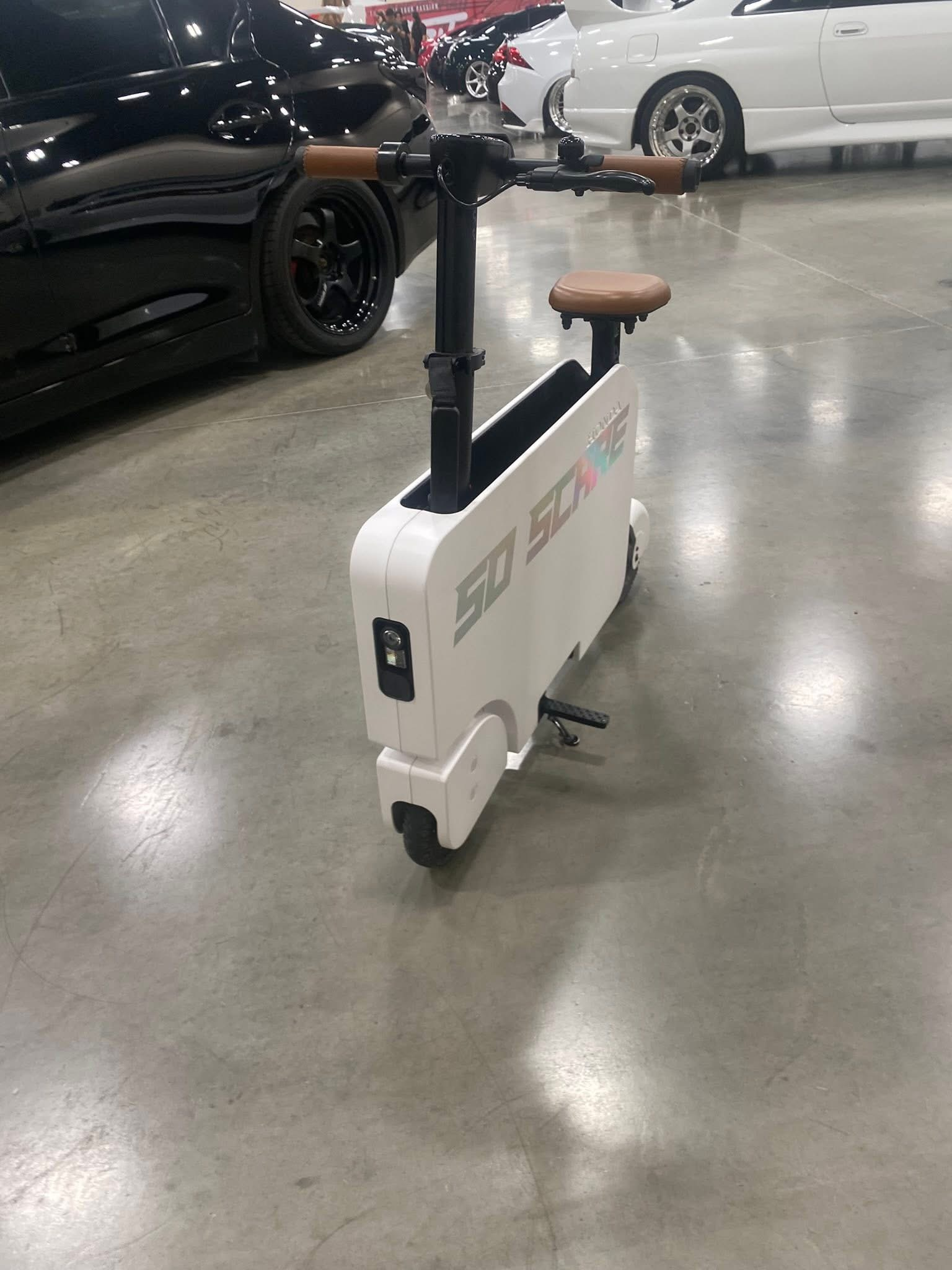
A customized white Honda Motocompacto at a Japanese Domestic Market autoshow in Calgary.

== In fiction ==
The Motocompo is used by Natsumi Tsujimoto in You're Under Arrest. It is tucked away at the back of her partner Miyuki Kobayakawa's Honda Today police car when not in use. It was released as a Bandai model kit.

The Motocompo also appears in the Jackie Chan movie Thunderbolt.

A Motocompo is the inspiration for the character Sou in the Kino's Journey —the Beautiful World— anime and manga series.

== See also ==
- Mazda Suitcase Car
- Welbike
