= Paradise Residence =

Japanese manga series

- First tankōbon volume cover, featuring Suzuka Misawa (left) and Hatsune Takanashi (right)

パラダイスレジデンス (Paradaisu Rejidensu)
- Genre: Comedy; Slice of life
- Manga
- Written by: Kōsuke Fujishima
- Published by: Kodansha
- English publisher: NA: Kodansha Comics
- Imprint: Afternoon KC
- Magazine: Good! Afternoon; (November 7, 2008 – January 7, 2012); Monthly Afternoon; (May 24, 2014 – January 25, 2016)
- Original run: November 7, 2008 – January 25, 2016
- Volumes: 4
- Light novel
- Written by: Kanan Norihara
- Illustrated by: Kōsuke Fujishima
- Published by: Kodansha
- Imprint: Kodansha Ranobe Bunko
- Original run: December 2, 2011 – September 2, 2014
- Volumes: 2
- icon

Paradise Residence (Japanese: パラダイスレジデンス, Hepburn: Paradaisu Rejidensu) is a Japanese manga series written and illustrated by Kōsuke Fujishima. It was first irregularly serialized in Kodansha's seinen manga magazine Good! Afternoon from November 2008 to January 2012, with its chapters collected in one tankōbon volume. It was transferred to Kodansha's seinen manga magazine Monthly Afternoon in May 2014, where it was serialized until January 2016, with its chapters collected in three tankōbon volumes. It was licensed for English release in North America by Kodansha Comics. A two-volume light novel adaptation was published between 2011 and 2014.

== Synopsis ==
The story follows Hatsune Takanashi, a first-year high school student who has recently enrolled at Kikka Academy, a remote all-girls boarding school atop a mountain. Living in Dormitory One, Takanashi, her dorm roommate and friend Suzuka Misawa, and the equally offbeat residents at the school get involved in many hijinks.

== Characters ==
Hatsune Takanashi (小鳥遊 初音, Takanashi Hatsune)
A first-year student at Kikka Academy, living in Dormitory One. A tomboy, she has simple but passionate interests, such as curry, motorcycles, and her favorite food, pudding. Her dislikes include homework, natto, and her rival Nyutabaru. She is a heavy sleeper, but also possesses incredible athletic skill.
Suzuka Misawa (三沢 寿々花, Misawa Suzuka)
A first-year student who is Takanashi's friend and roommate in Dormitory One. She is gentle and supportive to Takanashi.
Rio Komatsu (小松 理緒, Komatsu Rio)
A third-year student and the head of Dormitory One. She is Takanashi's senior, and has a tacky taste in fashion.
Ai Matsushima (松島 藍, Matsushima Ai)
A resident of Dormitory One. She is Takanashi's senior, and helps out with dormitory repairs and maintenance.
Nyutabaru (新田原)
A resident of Dormitory Two, a more modern built dormitory and a rival to Dormitory One. She is Takanashi's classmate and rival. Takanashi calls her "Pudding", much to her annoyance.
Miho Mitsuho (三穂 美保, Mitsuho Miho)
A second-year student and a resident of Dormitory One. She is part of the school's swim team as manager, and has masochistic tendencies. Takanashi calls her "Miho-Miho-Senpai".
Stephanie (ステファニー, Sutefanī)
A foreign exchange student from England and a resident of Dormitory One. She is Takanashi's senior, and tends to wear almost nothing, especially on hot days.
Tachiarai (太刀洗)
A resident of Dormitory One. She is Takanashi's senior, and is very popular with her peers.
Little Dorm Mother (小さい寮母さん, Chīsai Ryōbo-san)
An elementary school student who works as the dorm mother of Dormitory One. She is proficient in English, being able to converse with Stephanie.
Big Dorm Mother (大きい寮母さん, Ōkīri Ryōbo-san)
The mother of the Little Dorm Mother and the true dorm mother of Dormitory One. Despite everyone else having met her, Takanashi somehow never knew of her until three months into her residency.
Neopan (ネオパン)
The Kikka Academy's dog, kept by the Little Dorm Mother. His name is a reference to Neopan, due to his black-and-white fur. For some reason, he only bites Takanashi.
Ôminato (大湊)
A teacher at Kikka Academy and the supervisor of Dormitory One. The students call her "Minchin" (ミンチン) whenever she visits the dormitory. She drives an old jeep that Takanashi adores.

== Media ==
=== Manga ===
Written and illustrated by Kōsuke Fujishima, Paradise Residence was first irregularly serialized in Kodansha's seinen manga magazine Good! Afternoon, from its inaugural issue on November 7, 2008, to its 20th issue on January 7, 2012. Kodansha collected its eight chapters in one tankōbon volume on February 23, 2015, numbered "zero", at the same time the official first volume was released. The volume includes additional art and a short story by Kanan Norihara, who wrote the light novel adaptation of the manga.

After a hiatus, the manga was transferred to Good! Afternoon's parent magazine Monthly Afternoon on May 24, 2014. Its first chapter in the magazine was accompanied by an 80-page booklet compiling all eight chapters from Good! Afternoon. It was regularly serialized until its conclusion on January 25, 2016. Kodansha collected its chapters in three tankōbon volumes, released from February 23, 2015, to March 23, 2016.

During their panel at San Diego Comic-Con 2015, Kodansha Comics announced that they had licensed the manga for English release in North America. Three volumes were released between March 15 and September 6, 2016. The original volume "zero" was compiled with the first volume.

==== Volumes ====
No.	Original release date	Original ISBN	English release date	English ISBN
0	February 23, 2015	978-4-06-388030-4	March 15, 2016	978-1-68233-227-6 (digital); 978-1-63236-238-4 (print)
Extra Edition-1; 0-1. "Megaphone Wake-Up" (メガホンでお目覚め, Megahon de o Mezame); 0-2. "Stomach Growling" (はらのむし, Hara no Mushi); 0-3. "Operation Cornball" (ベタベタ計画, Betabeta Keikaku); 0-4. "In Love with Pudding" (プリンに恋して, Purin ni Koishite); 0-5. "New Record?!" (新記録!?, Shin Kiroku!?); 0-6. "Anpan and Milk" (あんぱんと牛乳, Anpan to Gyūnyū); 0-7. "Wake-Up ___" (目覚まし○○, Mezamashi ○○); 0-8. "What Does It Look Like?" (何に見える?, Nani ni Mieru?); Extra Edition-2; Story: "When the Peach Buds Swell, by Kanan Norihara" (花桃のつぼみふくらむ頃 野梨原花南, Hana Momo no Tsubomi Kukuramu Koro, Norihara Kanan)
1	February 23, 2015	978-4-06-388031-1	March 15, 2016	978-1-68233-227-6 (digital); 978-1-63236-238-4 (print)
1. "Likes and Dislikes" (好きとか嫌いとか, Suki toka Kirai toka); 2. "Pudding Summit" (プリンサミット, Purin Samitto); 3. "Takanashi vs. Neopan" (小鳥遊vs.ネオパン); 4. "The Whims of Summer" (夏の気まぐれ, Natsu no Kimagure); 5. "To Dormitory Two!" (いざ 第二寮へ!, Iza: Dai Ni Ryō e!); 6. "Miraculous Near-Miss" (奇跡のすれ違い, Kiseki no Surechigai); 7. "Paradise Typhoon" (楽園タイフーン, Rakuen Taifūn)
2	August 21, 2015	978-4-06-388075-5	June 14, 2016	978-1-68233-278-8 (digital); 978-1-63236-278-0 (print)
8. "The Typhoon Passes" (台風一過, Taifū Ikka); 9. "Takanashi's Simple Recipe!" (小鳥遊の簡単レシピ!, Takanashi no Kantan Reshipi!); 10. "Oh! My Absence" (ああっ助っ人SUMMER, Aa Suketto-samā); 11. "The Coast and the Curious" (目指せ海岸線, Mezase Kaigansen); 12. "Seaside Restaurant Special Forces!!" (海の家特殊軍隊!!, Umi no Ie Tokushu Guntai!!); 13. "Battle of the Beach" (浜辺の争奪戦, Hamabe no Sōdatsu-sen)
3	March 23, 2016	978-4-06-388122-6	September 6, 2016	978-1-68233-385-3 (digital); 978-1-63236-310-7 (print)
14. "All Their Adventures" (それぞれの冒険, Sorezore no Bōken); 15. "Homecoming" (帰省, Kisei); 16. "Shift Change" (シフトチェンジ, Shifuto Chenji); 17. "Goddess" (女神, Megami); 18. "The Dorm One Breeze" (第一寮の風, Dai Ichi Ryō no Kaze); 19. "Final Option!" (最終手段!!, Saishū Shudan!!); 20. "Dorm Festival Eve!" (寮祭前夜!, Ryō-sai Zenya!); 21. "Kikka Dormitory One" (橘花第一女子寮, Kikka Dai Ichi Joshi Ryō)

=== Light novel ===
A light novel adaptation, written by Kanan Norihara with new illustrations by Kōsuke Fujishima, was published by Kodansha in two volumes from December 2, 2011, to September 2, 2014. The second volume, subtitled Kaze Kaoru Gogatsu to Narimashitaga (風薫る五月となりましたが; 'It's May with the Scent of the Wind'), features an original story.

== Reception ==
Reviewing the first volume and its accompanying volume zero, Sean Gaffney of A Case Suitable for Treatment compared its slice of life setup to Kōsuke Fujishima's previous works like Oh My Goddess! and You're Under Arrest, commenting "the problem with this is that the series needs to rise and fall on [its] eccentric characters, and so far we don't really get a good handle on any except one or two ... [t]here's not as big a hook to draw people in as there is with Oh My Goddess!, and I doubt we'll get serious plotlines here." IncendiaryLemon of Anime UK News rated the first two volumes a seven out of ten, writing "Whilst it doesn't really bring anything new to the table, the first two volumes of Paradise Residence still make for quite an enjoyable read, providing a few laughs throughout."
