= Takeshi Watabe =

Japanese actor and voice actor

- 渡部 猛
- Born: March 21, 1936; Kōchi Prefecture, Japan
- Died: December 13, 2010 (aged 74)
- Occupations: Actor; voice actor
- Years active: 1950s–2010
- Agent: 81 Produce

Takeshi Watabe (渡部 猛, Watabe Takeshi; March 21, 1936 – December 13, 2010) was a Japanese actor and voice actor. He was born in Kōchi Prefecture. He usually played villains and performed the voices for many anime characters and tokusatsu villains. He is most famous for voicing Kaminari in Doraemon. He took over the ongoing roles of Shingo Kanemoto after his death. Other major roles included Inspector Takao Arizuka in the You're Under Arrest franchise, Naoyuki Kamikurata in Aquarian Age: Sign for Evolution, Colonel John Kowen in Mobile Suit Gundam 0083: Stardust Memory, and Director Yachio Tokugawa in Strawberry Eggs. He also wrote an instructional book about voice acting, Seiyū Naritai. On December 13, 2010, Watabe was being treated for lung cancer until he died of pneumonia at the age of 74.

== Filmography ==
=== Anime ===
List of voice performances in anime
| Year | Title | Role | Notes | Source |
|---|---|---|---|---|
| 1969 | Kamui the Ninja | Five-Nabari | | |
| 1970 | Tomorrow's Joe | Hirata | | |
| 1972 | Triton of the Sea | Poseidon | | |
| 1972 | Devilman | Kenetos | | |
| 1973 | Casshern | Bantesu | | |
| 1973 | Karate Baka Ichidai | Rogowski | | |
| 1975 | Maya the Honey Bee | Of sparrow bee senior statesmen-sparrow bee | | |
| 1975 | Time Bokan | Cock captain / master / Silver / Shogun | | |
| 1976 | 3000 Leagues in Search of Mother | Alexandre Giovanni | | |
| 1976 | Gaiking | Wilder | | |
| 1976 | Gowappa 5 Gōdam | Emperor Jigokuda | | |
| 1976 | Piccolino no Bōken | Fire 喰親 how | | |
| 1976 | Paul's Miraculous Adventure | Leader of Korokki / double-headed | | |
| 1977 | Lupin the Third Part II | Various characters | | |
| 1977 | Invincible Super Man Zambot 3 | Gaizokku | | |
| 1978 | The Story of Perrine | Captain / Emile | | |
| 1978 | Invincible Steel Man Daitarn 3 | Commander Special No. 1 / Commander Nendoru | | |
| 1979 | Cyborg 009 | Teal Win skiing Dr. | | |
| 1979 | Doraemon | Thunder | | |
| 1980 | Maeterlinck's Blue Bird: Tyltyl and Mytyl's Adventurous Journey | Official Academy オフィス・アカデミー | | |
| 1980 | Space Runaway Ideon | Guhaba-Geba / Gurudabura Delon | | |
| 1980 | Tomorrow's Joe 2 | Goromaki Gondō | | |
| 1981 | Galaxy Cyclone Braiger | Janrigo | | |
| 1983 | Mirai Keisatsu Urashiman | Arukapon | | |
| 1983–1994 | Plawres Sanshiro | Gengou Kurozaki | | |
| 1983 | Armored Trooper Votoms | Nehalco | | |
| 1985 | Blue Comet SPT Layzner | Gresco | | |
| 1986 | Ginga: Nagareboshi Gin | Gohee Takeda | | |
| 1986 | M.D. Geist | Golem | OVA | |
| 1987 | Choujinki Metalder | God Neros | | |
| 1987 | City Hunter | Fuyuki | | |
| 1987 | Esper Mami | Kuroiwa | | |
| 1987 | Mister Ajikko | God Hand big tiger | | |
| 1988 | Little Lord Fauntleroy | Dorin Court Earl | | |
| 1988 | Wounded Man | Nick Goresuki | OVA ep. 4 | |
| 1988 | Dagon in the Land of Weeds | Geppo | | |
| 1988 | Oishinbo | Mantaro Kyogoku | | |
| 1989–1990 | Akuma-kun | King Solomon | | |
| 1989 | Mobile Police Patlabor On Television | Oyaji | | |
| 1989 | Kimba the White Lion | Chief | | |
| 1989 | The Laughing Salesman | Henkido shopkeeper | | |
| 1989 | Dragon Quest | Great Demon King Baramos | | |
| 1990 | Dragon Ball Z: Bardock – The Father of Goku | Pumbukin | | |
| 1990 | Fujio Fujiko A's Mumako | Director, Haruhiko's Father | | |
| 1991 | Future GPX Cyber Formula | Gray Steinbeck | | |
| 1991 | Shizukanaru Don – Yakuza Side Story | bull neck | OVA | |
| 1991 | City Hunter '91 | President | | |
| 1991 | Doraemon | Kaminari | | |
| 1991 | Mobile Suit Gundam 0083: Stardust Memory | John Kowen | | |
| 1992 | Tekkaman Blade | Weaver | | |
| 1992 | My Patrasche | Scan Volkswagen marker | | |
| 1992 | Yu Yu Hakusho | Byakko | | |
| 1993 | The Laughing Salesman: Oversized issue of spring 笑ゥせぇるすまん春の特大号 | Henkido shopkeeper | special | |
| 1993 | Nintama Rantaro | Tsukaguchi Mizudo | | |
| 1993 | Ocean Waves | Principal | | |
| 1993 | Black Jack | Estefan Colonel | OVA ep. 3 "Clinical Chart 3: Decoration of Maria and Her Comrades" | |
| 1994 | Tico of the Seven Seas | Old man | | |
| 1994 | New Peacock King | Wushang | 2nd OVA series | |
| 1995 | Ninku | Battalion commander | | |
| 1995 | Mobile Suit Gundam Wing | Grandfather of Ginta | | |
| 1996 | Dragon Ball GT | Mutchi-Motchi | | |
| 1996 | Midori no Makibaō | Nobuhiko Horie | | |
| 1996 | Sailor Moon Sailor Stars | Kiriyama | Ep. 186 | |
| 1996 | You're Under Arrest | Takao Arizuka | | |
| 1997 | Maze | Sonushi Otoko 男創主 | | |
| 1997 | Master of Mosquiton '99 | Division Commander | | |
| 1998 | Beast Wars II: Super Life-Form Transformers | BB, Max B | | |
| 1998 | Cowboy Bebop | Chess Master Hex | | |
| 1998 | Princess Nine | Zenjiro | | |
| 1998 | Future GPX Cyber Formula SIN | Gray | | |
| 1999 | Pet Shop of Horrors | Manager, Police Chief Ross | | |
| 1999 | Sensual Phrase | Jessica owners | | |
| 1999 | Karakurizōshi Ayatsuri Sakon | Terao Yoshimasu | | |
| 1999 | Amazing Nurse Nanako | Griffith | | |
| 2001 | Salaryman Kintarō | Genzō Ōshima | | |
| 2001 | Zone of the Enders: 2167 Idolo | Burroughs | OVA | |
| 2001 | Noir | Tristan | | |
| 2001 | You're Under Arrest! Second Season | Takao Arizuka | | |
| 2001 | I My Me! Strawberry Eggs | Director Yachio Tokugawa | | |
| 2001 | Captain Kuppa | Garbo | | |
| 2001 | Kasumin | Elder Candle | | |
| 2001 | Najica Blitz Tactics | Kenzo Katsuragi | | |
| 2002 | Aquarian Age: Sign for Evolution | Naoyuki Kamikurata | | |
| 2002 | Magical Shopping Arcade Abenobashi | Taro Imamiya / Rintaro | | |
| 2002 | The Twelve Kingdoms | Masashi Nakajima | | |
| 2002 | Naruto | Gamabunta | | |
| 2003 | Sonic X | Yellow Zelkova | | |
| 2003 | Firestorm | Drew McAllister | | |
| 2003 | Kousetsu Hyaku Monogatari | Yahei | | |
| 2003 | Kaleido Star: New Wings | Alain Rubel | | |
| 2004 | Kaiketsu Zorori | King | | |
| 2004 | Paranoia Agent | chairperson | | |
| 2004 | Phoenix | Hanguk | TV series, Sun chapter | |
| 2004 | Melody of Oblivion | Prime minister | | |
| 2004 | Monster | Detective | | |
| 2004 | Samurai Champloo | Ingen Osho | | |
| 2004 | Shin Getter Robo | Chief priest | OVA volume 2 | |
| 2005 | Gallery Fake | Chief priest | | |
| 2005 | Gunparade March | Toji Kazama 風間東二 | | |
| 2005 | SoltyRei | Votre | | |
| 2006 | Otogi-Jūshi Akazukin | Elder | | |
| 2006 | Kemonozume | Director | | |
| 2007 | Naruto Shippuden | Gamabunta | | |
| 2007 | Romeo × Juliet | Priest | | |
| 2007 | Lupin III special | Obitaki | Ep. "Elusiveness of the Fog | |
| 2007 | You're Under Arrest Full Throttle | Takao Arizuka | | |
| 2008 | Shigofumi | Father of Senkawa | | |
| 2008 | Golgo 13 | Don Giovanni / Tommy Navarro | | |
| 2008 | Strike Witches | Churchill | | |
| 2008 | Michiko and Hatchin | Bung | | |
| 2009 | Mainichi Kaasan | Grandpa | | |
| | Crayon Shin-chan | Ikebukuro | | |
| | Pokémon | Elder | | |
| | Super Dimensional Fortress Macross II: Lovers Again | Balser | OVA ep. 5 | |
| | Case Closed | Tachibana | Ep. 51 | |
| | Panyo Panyo Di Gi Charat | Mike's father | | |
| | Tottoi | Jack Land | | |
| | Umi ga Kikoeru | Principal | | |
| | Yōtōden | Ryoma Kogure | | |

=== Film ===
List of voice performances in film
| Year | Title | Role | Notes | Source |
|---|---|---|---|---|
| 1983 | Crusher Joe: The Movie | Bluebeard Nero | | |
| 1986 | Fist of the North Star | Kiba Daio | | |
| 1986 | Ai City | Alloy | | |
| 1990 | Doraemon: Nobita and the Animal Planet | The Realtor | | |
| 1990 | City Hunter: Bay City Wars | Gomez | | |
| 1991 | Mobile Suit Gundam F91 | Cosmo-Eiges | | |
| 1992 | 21 Emon: Uchū Ike! Hadashi no Princess; 21エモン 宇宙いけ！ 裸足のプリンセス | Gargano | | |
| 1997 | Doraemon: Nobita and the Spiral City | Majin | | |
| 1998 | Maze Bakunetsu Jikuu: Tenpen Kyoui no Giant | Man Sonushi | | |
| 1999 | Doraemon: Nobita Drifts in the Universe | Mazura | | |
| 1999 | You're Under Arrest the MOVIE | Takao Arizuka | | |
| 2001 | Case Closed: Countdown to Heaven | Iwamatsu Ohki | | |
| 2002 | 6 Angels | Don G. Canyon | | |

=== Tokusatsu ===
List of voice performances in tokusatsu
| Year | Title | Role | Notes | Source |
|---|---|---|---|---|
| 1972 | Henshin Ninja Arashi | DokuUtsubo | Ep. 1 | |
| 1972 | Android Kikaider | Black Crow / Grasshopper Gray | Ep. 35, 40 | |
| 1973 | Kikaider 01 | Silver Shrimp / Gattaider / Bakeneko Robot / Shadow Knight (eps. 23 – 27 (voiced by Masao Imanishi (ep. 8 – 16, 20 – 22), Motomu Kiyokawa (ep. 17 – 19))), Big Gorilla / Big Gorilla II / Warudar (eps. 37 – 45) | Ep. 4, 7 – 8, 12, 23 – 27, 33, 37-45 | |
| 1973 | Inazuman | Sand Banbara / Oil Banbara | Ep. 8, 13 | |
| 1973 | Ultraman Taro | Mochiron / Veron / Dorobon / | Ep. 39, 48, 52 | |
| 1974 | Inazuman Flash | Hammer Desper / Udesper Alpha / Rebirth Hammer Desper | Ep. 1, 8-13, 18 | |
| 1974 | Denjin Zaborger | Narrator | | |
| 1974 | Ultraman Leo | Kirara | Ep. 32 | |
| 1975 | Himitsu Sentai Gorenger | Poison Fang Mask (ep. 7 – 8), Silver Heat Mask (ep. 12), Warship Mask (ep. 36) | Ep. 7 – 8, 12, 36 | |
| 1979 | Battle Fever J | Buffalo Monster (ep. 5), Doguu Monster (ep. 6), Snail Monster (ep. 13), Dinosaur Monster (ep. 21 – 22), Kodaigyō Monster (ep. 35), Hyde Monster (ep. 39) | Ep. 5 – 6, 15, 21 – 22, 35, 39 | |
| 1980 | Denshi Sentai Denjiman | Denji Computer | | |
| 1981 | Taiyo Sentai Sun Vulcan | Sea Snake Monger (ep. 25), Hungry Monger (ep. 26), Inazuma Gingar (eps. 45 – 49)/Inazuma Monger (ep. 49) | Ep. 25 – 26, 45 – 49 | |
| 1982 | Dai Sentai Goggle Five | Octopus Mozoo / Gecko Mozoo / Baku Mozoo / Lion Mozoo / Antlion Mozoo / Starfish Mozoo / Monkey Mozoo (ep. 18), Cactus Mozoo (ep. 20), Crab Mozoo (ep. 23), Boar Mozoo (ep. 26), Hyena Mozoo (ep. 35), Horned Owl Mozoo (ep. 39), Walrus Mozoo (ep. 40), Scorpion Mozoo (ep. 42), Condor Mozoo (ep. 44), Skunk Mozoo (ep. 46), Cheetah Mozoo (ep. 48) | Ep. 3, 6, 9, 11 – 12, 16, 18, 20, 23, 26, 35, 39 – 40, 42, 44, 46, 48 | |
| 1982 | Space Sheriff Gavan | Don Horror | | |
| 1982 | Batten Robomaru | Gutto | | |
| 1983 | Kagaku Sentai Dynaman | Emperor Aton | | |
| 1985 | Dengeki Sentai Changeman | Gyodai | | |
| 1986 | Jikuu Senshi Spielban | The Guardian Waller | | |
| 1988 | Kamen Rider Black | Creation King | | |
| 1988 | Choujuu Sentai Liveman | Earthquake Zuno / Space Zuno | Ep 39-40 | |
| 1989–1990 | Kousoku Sentai Turboranger | Great Bōma Emperor Ragorn | | |
| 1990 | Chikyuu Sentai Fiveman | Amoebarugin | Ep 18 | |
| 1992–93 | Kyōryū Sentai Zyuranger | BuckBuck | | |
| 1994 | Ninja Sentai Kakuranger | Elger Shuten Doji | Ep 16 | |
| 1995 | Juukou B-Fighter | Gaohm | | |
| 1996 | Gekisou Sentai Carranger | UU Uurin | Ep 12-13 | |
| 1997 | Carranger vs. Ohranger | Bara Wheel | OV | |
| 1997 | Denji Sentai Megaranger | Pig Nejire | Ep 29 | |
| 1998–99 | Seijuu Sentai Gingaman | Destruction King Battobas | Eps 1–2, 13, 30-49 | |

He was sometimes paired up with Kaoru Shinoda.

- Barom-1- Ikadorge
- Inazuman- Sunabanbara, Aburabanbara
- Akumaizer 3- Aonirda
- Ninja Captor- Mirror Ascetic
- Kaiketsu Zubat- Sentodevil (Actor: Kai Atou)
- Pro-Wres no Hoshi Aztecaser- Killer Kumazawa (Actor: Don Arakawa)
- Red Tiger- Commander Super, Commander Geller, Commander Marche
- Space Sheriff Sharivan – Guardian of the Iga Crystal
- Space Sheriff Shaider (Movie) – Meteor Gunman Omega
- Choujinki Metalder- God Neros, Furious Fighter Jamune, Explosive Fighter Damnen
- Kamen Rider Black- Creation King, Doram (movies, substituting for Shōzō Iizuka)
- Sekai Ninja Sen Jiraiya- Akunobo Sugitani
- Juukou B-Fighter – Gaohm

=== Video games ===
List of voice performances in video games
| Year | Title | Role | Notes | Source |
|---|---|---|---|---|
| 1996–1997 | Langrisser II series | Chaos | Der Langrisser FX and I & II | |
| 1998–2003 | Mobile Suit Gundam video games | John Kowen | SS | |
| 1998 | Radiant Silvergun | Canopy captain | SS | |
| 2000 | Fist of the North Star: The Legends of the True Savior 世紀末救世主伝説 北斗の拳 | Fang Great | PS1/PS2 film companion game | |
| 2001 | You're Under Arrest games | Takao Arizuka | PS1/PS2 | |
| 2003 | The Twelve Kingdoms games ja:十二国記 -紅蓮の標 黄塵の路- | Matsuyama Makotosan | PS1/PS2 | |
| 2006 | Another Century's Episode 2 | John Kowen | PS1/PS2 | |
| 2006 | Gunparade March series | Kazama Higashini | PS1/PS2, Green, Blue chapters | |

=== Overseas dubbing ===
==== Live-action ====
- Airport '77 (1987 TV Asahi edition) -
- Alien (1981 Laserdisc edition) – Parker (Yaphet Kotto)
- Anaconda – Paul Serone (Jon Voight)
- Any Given Sunday (2002 NTV edition) – Monroe (Jim Brown)
- Back to the Future (1990 Fuji TV edition) – Marvin Berry (Harry Waters Jr.)
- Ben-Hur (1990 NTV edition) – Quintus Arrius (Jack Hawkins)
- Bend of the River (1972 Fuji TV edition) – Red (Jack Lambert)
- Bird on a Wire (1993 TV Asahi edition) – Albert "Diggs" Diggins (Bill Duke)
- Breakdown – Warren"Red" Barr (J. T. Walsh)
- Casino Royale (1972 NTV edition) – Smernov (Kurt Kasznar)
- Casper: A Spirited Beginning – Kibosh (James Earl Jones)
- Caravan of Courage: An Ewok Adventure – Chukha-Trok
- Commando (1987 TBS edition) – Cooke (Bill Duke)
- The Empire Strikes Back (1980 Movie theater edition) – Rebel Derek "Hobbie" Klivian (Richard Oldfield)
- The Dark Crystal (Blu-Ray edition) – skekZok (Jerry Nelson)
- Dawn of the Dead (1982 TV Tokyo edition) – Dr. Millard Rausch (Richard France)
- Deliverance (1979 TV Asahi edition) – Mountain Man (Bill McKinney)
- The Elephant Man (1982 TBS edition) – Jim (Michael Elphick)
- The Exterminator (1981 Fuji TV edition) – Gino Pontivini (Dick Boccelli)
- Exit Wounds (DVD edition) – Frank Daniels (Bruce McGill)
- Force 10 from Navarone (1986 TV Asahi edition) – Captain Dražak (Richard Kiel)
- The Four Feathers (2006 TV Tokyo edition) – Colonel Sutch (James Cosmo)
- The French Connection (1974 Fuji TV edition) – Pierre Nicoli (Marcel Bozzuffi)
- The Getaway (1982 TV Asahi edition) – The Accountant (John Bryson)
- Glory (1994 NTV edition) – Sergeant Major John Rawlins (Morgan Freeman)
- Gunfight at the O.K. Corral (1977 NTV and 1985 TV Asahi editions) – Ike Clanton (Lyle Bettger)
- The Great Escape (1971 Fuji TV edition) – Haynes "Diversions" (Lawrence Montaigne)
- To Kill a Mockingbird (1972 NET edition) – Tom Robinson (Brock Peters)
- Kiss of the Dragon (2003 TV Tokyo edition) – Lupo (Max Ryan)
- Independence Day (1999 TV Asahi edition) – Marty Gilbert (Harvey Fierstein)
- Mad Max 2 (1984 Fuji TV edition) – Wez (Vernon Wells)
- Major Dundee (1972 TBS edition) – Samuel Potts (James Coburn)
- Midnight Run (VHS edition) – Alonzo Mosely (Yaphet Kotto)
- Midnight Run (1992 TV Asahi edition) – Tony (Richard Foronjy)
- Midway (1983 TV Asahi edition) – Captain Vinton Maddox (James Coburn)
- Miracles – Fei (Lo Lieh)
- Papillon (1979 Fuji TV edition) – Julot (Don Gordon)
- Play Dirty (1973 NET edition) – Boudesh (Scott Miller)
- Predator (1989 Fuji TV edition) – Major General Homer Philips (R.G. Armstrong)
- Psycho (1983 TBS edition) – Milton Arbogast (Martin Balsam)
- Rainbow Drive (1992 TV Tokyo edition) – Hans Roehrig (James Laurenson)
- Soylent Green (1978 Fuji TV edition) – Chief Hatcher (Brock Peters)
- Stuart Little – Officer Sherman (Jon Polito)
- A Thousand Acres – Harold Clark (Pat Hingle)

==== Animation ====
- Aladdin
- Animaniacs (Thaddeus Plotz)
- The Aristocats (French Milkman)
- Beauty and the Beast (Monsieur D'Arque)
- The Black Cauldron
- Dinosaur (Yar)
- DuckTales (El Capitan)
- The Jungle Book (ElephantG)
- The Jungle Book II (ElephantG)
- The Land Before Time Narrator
- The Land Before Time VIII: The Big Freeze (Narrator)
- The Land Before Time IX: Journey to Big Water (Narrator)
- Hercules
- Mulan (Ghost Human)
- Mulan II (Ghost Human)
- Robin Hood (King Richard)
- Tarzan (Tweelson)
- Tarzan 2 (Tweelson)
- Tarzan and Jane (Tweelson)
- Titan A.E. (Tek)

== Successors ==
- Katsumi Chō, Masanori Machida: Nintama Rantaro: Tsukaguchi Mizudo
- Hiroshi Naka: Naruto: Gamabunta
- Kenyuu Horiyuchi: Kaasan – Mom's Life: Grandpa
- Seizō Katō, Kyousei Tsuui: The Good Wife: (Jonas Stern Kevin Conway)
- Shōzō Iizuka: Space Sheriff Gavan: The Movie: Genesis King, Kamen Rider: Battride War
