= VCG (disambiguation) =

VCG may refer to:

- Vickrey–Clarke–Groves auction, a type of sealed-bid auction of multiple items
  - VCG mechanism, a generic truthful mechanism for achieving a socially-optimal solution
- Vectorcardiography, a method of recording the magnitude and direction of the electrical forces generated by the heart
- Visual China Group, a Chinese photo and media agency
- Via Chem Group, a Czech holding company
- Vietnam Coast Guard, the coast guard of Vietnam
