= Coastal Studios =

American recording studio

- Company type: Recording studio
- Founded: 1993; 32 years ago
- Headquarters: Wilmington, North Carolina, United States

Coastal Studios, formerly known as Coastal Carolina Sound Studios, is a recording studio located in Wilmington, North Carolina. The company has worked on many anime, live action films and television shows. The company is best known for its work on anime projects such as Blue Submarine No. 6 and Oh! My Goddess. The company previously provided ADR work for Hollywood films and television in the 1990s such as Batman & Robin, The Lion King, and Dawson's Creek.

== History ==
Coastal Carolina Sound Studios was founded in 1993 by Scott Houle. The company started doing ADR for feature films. The company then later began dubbing anime in 1995 after Scott was introduced to Robert Woodhead of AnimEigo. Coastal went on to dub Lupin III: The Fuma Conspiracy for their first anime project for Animeigo. Coastal continued to dub anime for AnimEigo and later other anime companies such as ADV Films, Bandai Visual, and Media Blasters. Coastal also worked on ADR in feature films and television programs. Coastal went on to dub the You're Under Arrest TV episodes, specials and movie from 2002 to 2003. Coastal Carolina Studios changed its name to Coastal Studios in 2007. Coastal Studios went on the dub Shogun Assassin 3: Slashing Blades of Carnage, Shogun Assassin 4: Five Fistfuls of Gold, Shogun Assassin 5, and Clamp School Detectives.

== Credits ==
Coastal Studio's production credits include:

Credits
Year	Title	Medium	Director	Publisher	Notes
1995	Baoh: The Visitor	Show (1)	Scott Houle	AnimEigo	
1995	Lupin III: The Fuma Conspiracy	Movie	Scott Houle	AnimEigo	AKA Rupan III: The Fuma Conspiracy
1995	You're Under Arrest (OVA)	Show (4)	Scott Houle	AnimEigo	
1996	Oh My Goddess!	Show (5)	Scott Houle	AnimEigo	
1996	Spirit of Wonder: Miss China's Ring	Show (1)	Scott Houle	AnimEigo	
1997	Crusher Joe: The Movie	Movie	Scott Houle	AnimEigo	Alternate dub
1997-1998	Crusher Joe: The OVAs	Show (2)	Scott Houle	AnimEigo	
1998	Earthian	Show (4)	Scott Houle	Media Blasters	
1998	The Special Duty Combat Unit Shinesman	Show (2)	Scott Houle	Media Blasters	
1999	Elf Princess Rane	Show (2)	Scott Houle	Media Blasters	
1999	Kite	Show (2)	Scott Houle	Media Blasters	
1999	Sailor Victory	Show (2)	Scott Houle	Media Blasters	
2000	Blue Submarine No. 6	Show (4)	Scott Houle	Bandai Visual	
2000	Princess Rouge: Legend of the Last Labyrinth	Show (2)	Scott Houle	Media Blasters	
2000	Virtua Fighter	Show (35)	Scott Houle	Media Blasters	24 episodes dubbed
2000	Voogie's Angel	Show (3)	Scott Houle	Media Blasters	
2000-2002	You're Under Arrest (TV)	Show (47)	Scott Houle	AnimEigo	
2003	You're Under Arrest: Specials	Show (6)	Scott Houle	ADV Films	
2003	You're Under Arrest: The Motion Picture	Movie	Scott Houle	ADV Films	
2005	Miami Guns	Show (13)	Scott Houle Pamela Weidner-Houle	AN Entertainment	
2007	Ashura	Movie	Scott Houle	AnimEigo	
2007	Shogun Assassin 3: Slashing Blades of Courage	Movie	Scott Houle	AnimEigo	Alternate dub
2008	Clamp School Detectives	Show (26)	Scott Houle	Bandai Visual	Alternate dub
2008	Shogun Assassin 4: Five Fistfuls of Gold	Movie	Scott Houle	AnimEigo	
2008	Shogun Assassin 5: Cold Road to Hell	Movie	Scott Houle	AnimEigo	
2012	Growing Up With Hello Kitty	Short (16)	Scott Houle	AnimEigo	12 episodes dubbed
