= Baoh =

Japanese manga series by Hirohiko Araki

- The 22 October 1984 issue of Weekly Shōnen Jump, featuring Baoh on the cover

バオー来訪者 (Bao Raihōsha)
- Genre: Superhero, horror
- Manga
- Written by: Hirohiko Araki
- Published by: Shueisha
- English publisher: NA: Viz Media
- Imprint: Jump Comics
- Magazine: Weekly Shōnen Jump
- Original run: 20 May 1984 – 12 February 1985
- Volumes: 2
- Original video animation
- Directed by: Hiroyuki Yokoyama
- Produced by: Reiko Fukakusa
- Written by: Kenji Terada
- Music by: Hiroyuki Namba
- Studio: Pierrot
- Licensed by: NA: AnimEigo
- Released: 1 November 1989
- Runtime: 48 minutes

Baoh (Japanese: バオー来訪者, Hepburn: Baō Raihōsha; lit. 'Baoh: The Visitor') is a Japanese manga series written and illustrated by Hirohiko Araki, most famous for his manga JoJo's Bizarre Adventure. Originally serialized in Shueisha's shōnen manga magazine Weekly Shōnen Jump from 1984 to 1985, it was later compiled into two tankōbon volumes. The series was adapted into a single-episode original video animation (OVA) by Studio Pierrot and distributed by Toho in 1989.

Baoh is Araki's first series to display his signature penchant for high-octane gore.

== Plot ==
17-year-old Ikuro Hashizawa is kidnapped and turned into a Baoh, a bioweapon with superhuman strength and other abilities, by the organization Doress. He escapes with the help of Sumire, a 9-year-old psychic girl. Dr. Kasuminome, head scientist at Doress, sends various assassins and monsters to try and kill Ikuro, desperate to stop the Baoh parasite inside him.

== Characters ==
=== Main characters ===
Ikuro Hashizawa (橋沢 育朗, Hashizawa Ikurō)
Voiced by: Hideyuki Hori (OVA) / Koki Uchiyama (JoJo's Bizarre Adventure: All Star Battle) (Japanese); Brian Hinnant (OVA) (English)
The 17-year-old Ikuro initially knows very little of his past, waking up in the clutches of Doress and accompanying and protecting Sumire. He soon discovers that he has been transformed into a Baoh (standing for Biological Armament On Help), the result of Doress's evolution experimentations to produce a parasitic worm that buries itself into its host brain, slowly transforming them into a nigh-unstoppable killing machine. He later discovers that he was the victim of a traffic accident, with his survival beneficial to Doress's experimentations.
When the host body is attacked (such as during Ikuro's near death at the hands of Number 22), it transforms by means of the Baoh Armed Phenomenon (バオー武装現象（アームド・フェノメノン）, Baō Āmudo Fenomenon), covering its body in a protective armor that grants the body superhuman strength and healing, which he can also use to heal others. As a Baoh, Ikuro displays other abilities. Baoh Meltedin Palm Phenomenon (バオー・メルテッディン・パルム・フェノメノン, Baō Meruteddin Parumu Fenomenon) allows him to secrete corrosive enzymes from his hands, melting through metal and human flesh. Baoh Reskiniharden Saber Phenomenon (バオー・リスキニハーデン・セイバー・フェノメノン, Baō Risukinihāden Seibā Fenomenon) produces two blades coming out of his arms that can slice through nearly anything. Baoh Shooting Bees-Stingers Phenomenon (バオー・シューティングビースス・スティンガー・フェノメノン, Baō Shūtingubīsusu Sutingā Fenomenon) turns Baoh's hair into needle-like projectiles that burst into flames upon contact. His most powerful ability is the Baoh Break-Dark-Thunder Phenomenon (バオー・ブレイク・ダーク・サンダー・フェノメノン, Baō Bureiku Dāku Sandā Fenomenon), where his body produces up to 60,000 volts of electrical energy, powerful enough to power a laser cannon. The only way to kill a Baoh is to kill the worm, by removing it from the brain by force and then burning it alive. A Baoh will also die after 111 days of the worm living in its brain, after which its larvae leave and kill the host, seeking out hosts of their own. A Baoh can also be put into dormancy by submerging the host in salt water.
Sumire (スミレ)
Voiced by: Noriko Hidaka (Japanese); Kimberly Helms-Stewart (English)
A 9-year-old girl possessing psychic abilities, including automatic writing, table-turning, and precognition. She is also a captive of Doress, as they wish to exploit her psychic abilities. She keeps another of Doress's experiments, a brand new marsupial-like lifeform she has named Sonny-Steffan Nottsuo (サニー・ステフェン・ノッツォ, Sanī Sutefen Nottso) as a pet.

=== Doress ===
The Secret Organization Doress (秘密組織ドレス, Himitsu Soshiki Doresu) created Baoh and seeks to kill Ikuro before the virus can spread.

Dr. Kasuminome (霞の目博士, Kasuminome-hakase)
Voiced by: Ichirō Nagai (Japanese); Michael S. Way (English)
Doress's main scientist who is responsible for the creation of the Baoh parasite. Perhaps the ultimate irony, which Professor Kasuminome himself voices near the end of the OVA, is that he succeeded far too well. His intent was to create the ultimate soldier, a weapon of such power no one could possibly defeat it, but in doing so he created Baoh—a weapon no one, including Doress or Kasuminome himself, could ever possibly control or contain. Hirohiko Araki named him after the Kasuminome (霞目) neighborhood of Wakabayashi-ku, Sendai.
Sophine (女工作員（ソフィーヌ）, Sofīnu)
Voiced by: Yō Inoue (Japanese); Sara Seidman-Vance (English)
Kasuminome's assistant. She is first seen chasing Sumire when she escapes in the first chapter.
Number 22 (第22の男, Dai Nijū-ni no Otoko)
Voiced by: Ikuya Sawaki (Japanese); Sean P. O'Connell (English)
One of Doress's assassins sent to kill Ikuro Hashizawa and recapture Sumire. He unwittingly sparks Ikuro's Baoh Armed Phenomenon transformation and is killed.
Colonel Dordo (ドルド中佐, Dorudo-chūsa)
Voiced by: Shūichi Ikeda (Japanese); Dave Underwood (English)
Doress's top assassin, said to be able to blow someone's brains out with a single sniper shot. During the fight with Ikuro, it is revealed that Dordo is actually a cyborg.
Walken (ウォーケン, Wōken)
Voiced by: Yusaku Yara (Japanese); Chuck Denson Jr. (English)
A psychic assassin under Doress's pay, the last of a tribe of Native Americans known as the Skookum (スクークム族, Sukūkumu-zoku). He is the world's most powerful psychic, capable of melting objects with his telekinesis using the Molecular Air Motion Wave (分子空動波, Bunshi Kūdō Ha) and warp the ground with the Molecular Seismic Wave (分子地動波, Bunshi Chidō Ha). He sees Baoh as a worthy opponent and carves a sigil into his chest, claiming that he will kill Baoh. Baoh, however, gains the upper hand by flinging his sabers off at him, removing his power dampening bandana, only for Walken to seek vengeance. Hirohiko Araki named Walken after American actor Christopher Walken.

== Cast ==
Cast
Role	Japanese	English
Role	Japanese	Coastal Studios (1995)
Ikuro Hashizawa	Hideyuki Hori	Brian Hinnant
Sumire	Noriko Hidaka	Kimberly Helms-Stewart
Dr. Kasuminome	Ichirō Nagai	Michael S. Way
Colonel Dordo	Shūichi Ikeda	Dave Underwood
Sophine	Yō Inoue	Sara Seidman-Vance
Walken	Yusaku Yara	Chuck Denson Jr.
Masked Men	Shinya Ōtaki Masaharu Satō Ikuya Sawaki	Paul Johnson Marc Matney Mark Franklin
Number 22		Sean P. O'Connell
Girl	Tomoko Maruo	Sandy Clubb
Technicians	Kōzō Shioya	Patrick Humphrey Frank Lynn Gary Lawton
Soldiers	Michitaka Kobayashi	Jim Clark Nick Manatee Kevin Greenway

== Staff ==
Production staff
Staff role	Person
Director	Hiroyuki Yokoyama
Supervisor-in-chief / Storyboards	Hisayuki Toriumi
Executive producers	Kazuo Nakano Haruo Sai
Producer	Reiko Fukusa
Screenplay	Kenji Terada
Character designer / Animation director	Yoshitomo Sanaba
Mechanical designer	Masayoshi Tano
Director of photography	Jin Kaneko
Art director	Michiharu Miyamae
Audio director	Noriyoshi Matsuura
Assistant animation directors	Yoshimitsu Ōhashi Hiroki Takagi Shōichi Masuo
Music	Hiroyuki Namba

=== English localization ===
English localization staff
Staff role	Person
Executive producer	Robert Woodhead
Producer	Janice Hindle Peter R. Haswell
Production coordinator	Natsumi Ueki
Dialog editor	R. Roe Adams III
Translator	Shin Kurokawa Michael House
Subtitling director	Michael House
Dubbing director	Scott Houle
Script supervisor	William Bailey
Audio engineer	Nick Stuteville
Dialog mixer	Ron Abfalter
SFX editor	Skip Bowerman
M&E editor	Kevin Turner
Communications	Billie Houle
Duplications	Billie J. Toney

== Licensing ==
The manga was licensed in English and released in monthly chapters by Viz Media in 1990; sales were low, and it was not until 1995 that they released it in graphic novel format. The OVA was licensed for an English DVD release by AnimEigo in 2000 and was released in 2001.

== Other appearances ==
The series' main protagonist, Ikuro Hashizawa, was released on 14 November 2013 as a downloadable playable character in JoJo's Bizarre Adventure: All Star Battle in his Baoh form. In the 2022 remaster JoJo's Bizarre Adventure: All Star Battle R he is included in the initial roster.

== Reception ==
Hiroyuki Takei, author of the manga Shaman King, said it was one of his favorite series along with JoJo's Bizarre Adventure in his youth.

The Encyclopedia of Science Fiction described Baoh as a "forgettable but fun" example of science-fiction horror, praising its animation and action while criticizing its short runtime for leaving little room for characterization or narrative development. The encyclopedia highlighted the OVA's extensive gore and spectacle, but argued that its emphasis on action prevented it from developing sufficient tension to become genuinely frightening.
