= Toppu GP =

Japanese manga series

- First tankōbon volume cover, featuring Toppu Uno

トップウGP (Toppū GP)
- Genre: Sports (motorcycle racing)
- Manga
- Written by: Kōsuke Fujishima
- Published by: Kodansha
- English publisher: NA: Kodansha USA
- Imprint: Afternoon KC
- Magazine: Monthly Afternoon
- Original run: May 25, 2016 – present
- Volumes: 17
- icon

Toppu GP (Japanese: トップウGP, Hepburn: Toppū Jīpī) is a Japanese manga series written and illustrated by Kōsuke Fujishima. It has been serialized in Kodansha's seinen manga magazine Monthly Afternoon since May 2016, with its chapters collected in 17 tankōbon volumes as of September 2026. In North America, the manga was licensed for English release by Kodansha USA.

== Plot ==
The story revolves around Toppu Uno, who at age 18, aspires to become the youngest champion in the history of MotoGP, the world's most prestigious motorcycle racing championship. How he got there began seven years ago, when at the encouragement of his father, Teppei, and his childhood friend, fellow motorcyclist Myne Arai, Toppu reluctantly decided to try out motorcycle racing, soon discovering he was a natural.

== Characters ==
Toppu Uno (宇野 突風, Uno Toppū)
A motorcycle racing enthusiast, he began his training at the age of 11 at the encouragement of his father, Teppei, and his childhood friend, Myne Arai. He possesses total recall, being able to remember and recreate anything he sees at a glance. Apart from his love of motorcycles, Toppu also likes building toy Gundam models.
Teppei Uno (宇野 鉄平, Uno Teppei)
Toppu's father. While his main profession is as a novelist, he also works as a motorcycle mechanic for neighbor Myne Arai, taking her and Toppu along to the race tracks.
Myne Arai (新井 真音, Arai Main)
A skilled motorcycle racer who holds a winning streak in 100cc motorcycle races, about to move up to the 250cc class. She is older than Toppu, who affectionately calls her "Big Sis", and is childhood friends and neighbors with him. Teppei provides her with various kinds of support, such as bike maintenance.
Yoshiya Takadai (高台 吉哉, Takadai Yoshiya)
A fellow motorcycle racer in Toppu's class, who becomes his first rival. His father is an acquaintance of Teppei.

== Publication ==
Written and illustrated by Kōsuke Fujishima, Toppu GP started in Kodansha's seinen manga magazine Monthly Afternoon on May 25, 2016. Kodansha has collected its chapters into individual tankōbon volumes. The first volume was released on November 22, 2016. As of September 18, 2026, 17 volumes have been released.

In North America, Kodansha USA is simultaneously publishing the series in English on Kindle and Comixology. It was digitally published by Crunchyroll Manga from March 2018 to January 2023. Kodansha USA also publishes the series in print, with the first volume being published on April 11, 2017.

=== Volumes ===
No.	Original release date	Original ISBN	English release date	English ISBN
1	November 22, 2016	978-4-06-388208-7	April 11, 2017	978-1-68233-629-8 (digital); 978-1-63236-451-7 (print)
1. "Toppu Uno" (宇野突風, Uno Toppū); 2. "Full Throttle" (全開, Zenkai); 3. "Talking with the Machine" (マシンとの対話, Mashin to no Taiwa); 4. "Means and Objectives" (手段と目的, Shudan to Mokuteki); 5. "Weighted" (荷重, Kajū); 6. "Yesterday's Enemy Is..." (昨日の敵は……, Kinō no Teki wa......); 7. "Female Rider" (女性ライダー, Josei Raidā)
2	July 21, 2017	978-4-06-388279-7	October 24, 2017	978-1-68233-941-1 (digital); 978-1-63236-452-4 (print)
8. "Transfer Student" (転校生, Tenkōsei); 9. "Performance" (楽奏, Gakusō); 10. "Counterattack" (逆襲, Gyakushū); 11. "Reading the Line" (ラインの読みあい, Rain no Yomi ai); 12. "True Love" (本当の"好き", Hontō no "Suki"); 13. "250CC Class" (250ccクラス, 250cc Kurasu); 14. "Rising Pulse" (高鳴る鼓動, Takanaru Kodō)
3	March 23, 2018	978-4-06-510781-2	August 14, 2018	978-1-64212-405-7 (digital); 978-1-63236-515-6 (print)
15. "Acceleration Battle" (加速勝負, Kasoku Shōbu); 16. "Desire to Win" (勝ちたい気持ち, Kachitai Kimochi); 17. "Spin, Spin, Spin" (廻る廻る, Mawaru Mawaru); 18. "Memory" (記憶, Kioku); 19. "Mental Brakes" (心のブレーキ, Kokoro no Burēki); 20. "Playing Tag" (鬼ごっこ, Onigokko); 21. "Rain" (レイン, Rein)
4	September 21, 2018	978-4-06-512774-2	April 30, 2019	978-1-64212-850-5 (digital); 978-1-63236-577-4 (print)
22. "Rival Cooperation" (ライバルとの共闘, Raibaru to no Kyōtō); 23. "The Rain Comes Down" (雨は強く, Ame wa Tsuyoku); 24. "The Worth of Two Feet" (数十センチの価値, Sū Jū-senchi no Kachi); 25. "Growth" (成長, Seichō); 26. "Her Riding Suit" (姉ちゃんのスーツ, Nēchan no Sūtsu); 27. "Ride Ugly" (ブザマな走り, Buzamana Hashiri); 28. "Victory Dinner" (勝利の晩ごはん, Shōri no Ban Gohan)
5	May 23, 2019	978-4-06-515485-4	July 13, 2021	978-1-64659-410-8 (digital); 978-1-64651-009-2 (print)
29. "What's Endurance" (耐久ってなに?, Taikyū tte nani?); 30. "Tsukuba 2000" (筑波2000); 31. "Team Work" (コンビネーション, Konbinēshon); 32. "Endurance Qualifier" (耐久予選, Taikyū Yosen); 33. "Team Myne" (チームマイン, Chīmumain); 34. "A Serious Game" (真剣な遊び, Shinkenna Asobi); 35. "The Red-Hot Line" (灼熱のライン, Shakunetsu no Rain)
6	December 23, 2019	978-4-06-517922-2	November 23, 2021 (digital); January 18, 2022 (print)	978-1-63699-393-5 (digital); 978-1-64651-208-9 (print)
36. "Second" (二番手, Ni-bante); 37. "Banking" (バンク, Banku); 38. "War of Attrition" (持久戦, Jikyū-sen); 39. "All I Can Do for Now" (今、君が出来ること, Ima, Kimi ga Dekiru Koto); 40. "Step by Step" (ひたひた, Hitahita); 41. "Myne in Adversity" (逆境マイン, Gyakkyō Main); 42. "Lapped" (周回遅れ, Shūkai Okure)
7	August 21, 2020	978-4-06-520222-7	January 18, 2022 (digital); February 8, 2022 (print)	978-1-63699-394-2 (digital); 978-1-64651-240-9 (print)
43. "Blessed Rains" (恵みの雨, Megumi no Ame); 44. "My Turn" (俺のターン, Ore no Tān); 45. "Crush It" (ブチかませ, Buchi kama se); 46. "Trick Up the Sleeve" (隠し玉, Kakushi-dama); 47. "Finish" (決着, Kecchaku); 48. "He Loves It" (好きということ, Suki to iu Koto); 49. "Just Do It" (やるんだ, Yaru Nda)
8	March 23, 2021	978-4-06-522561-5	April 19, 2022	978-1-68491-245-2 (digital); 978-1-64651-471-7 (print)
50. "Way to Go" (ナイスファイト, Naisufaito); 51. "The World" (世界, Sekai); 52. "Challenging the Unknown" (未知への挑戦, Michi e no Chōsen); 53. "Determination" (決意, Ketsui); 54. "Go Where" (どこに?, Doko ni?); 55. "Door to the Future" (未来への扉, Mirai e no Tobira); 56. "Of Course I Will Be" (なるよ?, Naru yo?)
9	October 21, 2021	978-4-06-525165-2	July 19, 2022 (digital); August 9, 2022 (print)	978-1-68491-326-8 (digital); 978-1-64651-610-0 (print)
57. "He's So Lucky" (いいなあ, Ii nā); 58. "Yes, I Would" (走りたいです, Hashiritaidesu); 59. "Doorway to the World" (世界の入り口, Sekai no Iriguchi); 60. "You Wanna Do This?" (やるんだろ, Yaru Ndaro); 61. "There You Are" (来たか, Kita ka); 62. "Bring It On!!" (かかってこい!!, Kakatte koi!!); 63. "Challengers" (挑戦者たち, Chōsenshatachi)
10	May 23, 2022	978-4-06-527891-8	December 20, 2022	978-1-68491-745-7 (digital); 978-1-64651-611-7 (print)
64. "It's Nice to Have a Comrade" (仲間っていいな, Nakama tte Ii na); 65. "You Always Race with Demons" (レースはいつも鬼ばかり, Rēsu wa Itsumo Oni bakari); 66. "Mind Games" (駆け引き, Kakehiki); 67. "I Want to Beat You" (勝ちたい, Kachitai); 68. "The Definition of Victory and Defeat" (勝ち負けの定義, Kachimake no Teigi); 69. "Locked On" (ロックオン, Rokkuon); 70. "The World Seen from Outside the Circuit" (コースの外から見る世界, Kōsu no Soto kara Miru Sekai)
11	December 22, 2022	978-4-06-529913-5	May 23, 2023	979-8-88933-007-3 (digital); 978-1-64651-733-6 (print)
71. "Let's Trash Them" (ボコボコにしちゃうぞ, Bokoboko ni Shichauzo); 72. "It Feels so Good" (超キモチイイ, Chō Kimochīi); 73. "Let's Dance In Hell" (地獄で踊ろう, Jigoku de Odorō); 74. "Last Lap" (ラストラップ, Rasutorappu); 75. "Lamentation and Celebration" (悔しさと喜びと, Kuyashi-sa to Yorokobi to); 76. "New Encounters" (新たな出会い, Aratana Deai); 77. "A Wild Q2" (波乱のQ2, Haran no Q2)
12	July 21, 2023	978-4-06-532391-5	March 26, 2024	979-8-88933-525-2 (digital); 979-8-88877-075-7 (print)
78. "Fixation on Victory" (勝ちへの執念, Kachi e no Shūnen); 79. "Challenging the Creator" (設計者への挑戦, Sekkei-sha e no Chōsen); 80. "Last Year's Champion" (前年優勝者, Zennen Yūshō-sha); 81. "On His Back" (その背中には, Sono Senaka ni wa); 82. "Celebration" (セレブレーション, Sereburēshon); 83. "Triumphant Homecoming" (凱旋登校, Gaisen Tōkō); Bonus: "You're Under Arrest GP" (逮捕しちゃうぞGP, Taiho Shichauzo GP) (Note: Crossover with You're Under Arrest, featuring guest appearances by Miyuki Kobayakawa and Natsumi Tsujimoto.)
13	February 22, 2024	978-4-06-534502-3	January 28, 2025	979-8-89478-359-8 (digital); 979-8-88877-328-4 (print)
84. "Whirlwind Tour" (弾丸遠征, Dangan Ensei); 85. "A Fateful Transaction" (運命の取引, Unmei no Torihiki); 86. "Bold Proclamation" (爆勝宣言, Bakushō Sengen); 87. "Activating the Toppu Shift" (突風シフト発動, Toppū Shifuto Hatsudō); 88. "Passing Five" (5人抜き, Go-nin Nuki); 89. "Inside or Outside" (内か外か, Uchi ka Soto ka); 90. "After the Rush" (快進撃からの, Kaishingeki kara no)
14	September 20, 2024	978-4-06-536679-0	April 28, 2026	979-8-89830-052-4 (digital); 979-8-88877-541-7 (print)
91. "Time of Challenges" (試練のターン, Shiren no Tān); 92. "Secret Ride" (秘密のライド, Himitsu no Raido); 93. "Too Much Pain"; 94. "Tachypsychia" (タキサイキア, Takisaikia); 95. "Back Home, Then" (それなら帰国, Sorenara Kikoku); 96. "Even on the Sidelines" (蚊帳の外でも, Kaya no Soto demo); 97. "Summer School" (サマースクール, Samāsukūru)
15	May 22, 2025	978-4-06-539429-8	—	—
98. Kyōgi-sha no Honbun (競技者の本分); 99. Tsuisō no Hitoshōbu (追想の一勝負); 100. Egui Kudari (えぐい下り); 101. Urakata no Hokori (裏方の誇り); 102. Sonotoki wa Kuru (その時は来る); 103. Tsuba Seriai (つば競り合い); 104. Disonansu (ディソナンス)
16	January 22, 2026	978-4-06-542027-0	—	—
105. Jōshō Tsuinzu (上昇ツインズ); 106. Mikkusu Appu (ミックスアップ); 107. Sa no Nai Shōbu (差のない勝負); 108. Are o Iretai (あれを入れたい); 109. Neruko wa Nobiru (寝る子は伸びる); 110. Raiki no Koto nado (来季の事など); 111. Junan Agein (受難アゲイン)
17	September 18, 2026	978-4-06-544818-2	—	—
112. Tabibito e no Senrei (旅人への洗礼); 113. Gyakushū no Akuseru (逆襲のアクセル); 114. Watashi no Ibasho (私の居場所); 115. Aseru Bakarija (焦るばかりじゃ); 116. Nazo ga Tokete Yuku (謎がとけてゆく); 117. Subarashī Kuni (すばらしい国); 118. Kawahara no Bukyoku (河原の舞曲)

== Reception ==
Reviewing the first English volume, three editors of Anime News Network had differing opinions of the manga. Rebecca Silverman found the artwork to be "gorgeous in more ways than one", especially of the motorcycles, though she noted the "racing gets more time than the people, which makes it feel a little patchy as far as story flow goes." Nik Freeman, on the other hand, felt the manga was forgettable, in part due to being "completely lacking in any interesting or relatable characters". Amy McNulty described the manga's characters and plot as "shallow", criticizing it for relying on "conventional sports manga tropes and fail[ing] to develop them adeptly thus far". Sean Gaffney of A Case Suitable for Treatment was more positive, writing "You can argue all you want that [Kōsuke] Fujishima sometimes skimps on characterization, but there's no doubt the man knows how to write a race ... [it is] exciting, understandable, fast, and it makes you want to find out more about it yourself."
