= AnimeNation =

Defunct American anime-centered company

- Type: Private
- Genre: Anime
- Founded: 1995
- Founder: Gene Field
- Defunct: 2015
- Headquarters: Tampa, Florida, United States
- Key people: Gene Field; John Oppliger
- Divisions: AN Entertainment; RentAnime.com
- Website: www.animenation.com

AnimeNation was an American business that included RentAnime.com, a discussion forum, anime industry news, and a column called "Ask John". It was previously a retailer of anime and manga products until 2014 and an anime licensing and distribution company under the name AN Entertainment.

== AnimeNation ==
AnimeNation was founded in 1995 by Gene Field in Clearwater, Florida. After the company's initial success, they opened a retail location. They considered licensing shows in 1998 including Berserk and Cyber Team in Akihabara, but did not move forward until the company's stability improved. In 1999, the company built a 15,000-square-foot facility in the Lynmar Commerce Park, Tampa, Florida. As of 2004, AnimeNation was one of the top two online anime specialty retailers in the United States. The site also features a regular column, "Ask John", where AN employee John Oppliger answers reader questions about anime. As of 2005, Oppliger had written over 1,070 articles. The AnimeNation online store closed in 2014, though the Ask John blog and forums continue to operate as of October 2, 2026.

== AN Entertainment ==
In 2002, AnimeNation entered the anime market due to increased licensing and retail competition. The name AN Entertainment comes from AnimeNation (AN), and Entertainment was chosen to possibly allow other shows (including live action) to be licensed. They chose to finish one title before licensing another in order to produce the highest quality product. Small staffing numbers also influenced the decision.

The first title the company licensed was Risky Safety with Bang Zoom! Entertainment producing the dub and ADV Films distributing the release. AN Entertainment used a script created by fansub group Sachigumi with modifications for its Risky Safety release and also acquired the TV broadcast rights. AN Entertainment acquired Miami Guns, but not TV broadcast rights, and the dub was produced by Phoenix Post Sound (Coastal Studios). Haré+Guu was licensed by AN Entertainment (including TV broadcast rights), and co-produced with Bang Zoom! Entertainment. Bang Zoom! produced the dub and Funimation distributed Haré+Guu. They also licensed Haré+Guu Deluxe, but did not license Haré+Guu FINAL. The original ending for the Haré+Guu TV show could not be used due to a licensing problem involving Bandai. Haré+Guu was the first show aired on the Funimation Channel that was not a property of Funimation. AN Entertainment's license for Risky Safety expired in Fall 2007.

== RentAnime.com ==
RentAnime.com website logo

AnimeNation also ran RentAnime.com, a DVD-by-mail service similar to Netflix, that specialized in anime. The service suffered from mailing issues with the Tampa United States Postal Service, but they were later resolved. RentAnime.com continued to operate despite the closure of AnimeNation's online store, until it closed at the end of 2015.

== See also ==
- Right Stuf Inc.
