= AnimEigo =

American anime distributor

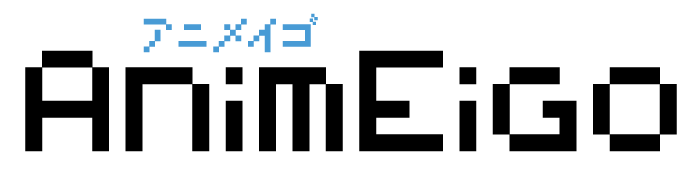
- Type: Private
- Industry: Entertainment (anime)
- Founded: 1988; 38 years ago in Ithaca, New York, United States
- Founders: Robert Woodhead; Roe R. Adams III
- Headquarters: Wilmington, North Carolina, United States
- Area served: United States and Canada
- Key people: Robert Woodhead; Roe R. Adams III; Natsumi Ueki; Janice Hindle
- Products: Anime, samurai cinema
- Owner: MediaOCD (2024–present)
- Website: www.animeigo.com

AnimEigo is an American entertainment company that licenses and distributes anime, samurai films and Japanese cinema. Founded in 1988 by Robert Woodhead and Roe R. Adams III, the company was one of the first in North America dedicated to licensing anime and helped give anime a noticeable following in the region. Over its history, the company has released many anime titles, such as Urusei Yatsura, You're Under Arrest, Vampire Princess Miyu, Otaku no Video, the original Bubblegum Crisis OVA series, and Kimagure Orange Road.

Their name is a portmanteau of "anime" and "eigo" (英語), the Japanese word for the English language.

== History ==
The original AnimEigo logo.

The company was founded in 1988 in Ithaca, New York, by Robert Woodhead and Roe R. Adams III while they were working on Wizardry IV: The Return of Werdna as a joke. Their first release was Metal Skin Panic Madox 01. The company later relocated to Wilmington, North Carolina, where it was run by Natsumi Ueki, Woodhead's wife. In July 2003, the company signed a deal with Koch Entertainment to help market and distribute their titles in the United States and Canada.

Between 2010 and 2013, the company lost a lot of its titles. For example, in February 2010, they announced they lost the rights to the Oh My Goddess! OVAs. In April 2010, the company announced they were unable to license the remaining episodes of Yawara!. They later lost the rights to the episodes they had previously licensed. In February 2011, the company announced they had lost the rights to Urusei Yatsura, one of their more popular titles. The company also lost the rights to the You're Under Arrest and Battle Royal High School anime series, as well as the Zatoichi, Lone Wolf and Cub, and Portrait of Hell live action movies.

In October 2013, AnimEigo launched their first Kickstarter campaign to crowdfund a new release, specifically to re-release Bubblegum Crisis as a limited edition Blu-ray. The Kickstarter was successfully funded in October 2013, and the Blu-ray was subsequently released in December 2014. They also successfully kickstarted re-releases of Otaku no Video, Riding Bean, A.D. Police Files, Gunsmith Cats, Megazone 23, Metal Skin Panic MADOX-01, and Macross II: Lovers Again.

In February 2024, MediaOCD, a post-production firm owned by Anime News Network founder Justin Sevakis, acquired AnimEigo's video distribution business. Woodhead and Ueki stayed on to assist in the transition and oversaw the completion of existing projects before they retired.

== Distribution ==
The company streams their titles on Hoopla, RetroCrush, Tubi, and CONtv. Some of their titles were on Hulu and VRV (via VRV Select), but they have been removed.

The company is well known for the quality of its translation and subtitles, and pioneered such techniques as multi-color subtitles, overlapping dialogue, and supertitles that explain important cultural, linguistic and historical tidbits. They also include comprehensive cultural and linguistic liner notes with their releases. Alert viewers will often find subtle references to pop culture and current events hidden in the subtitles when they match what the characters are actually saying. Sometimes the references are blatant; in episode 18 of Super Dimension Fortress Macross, the dying Roy Fokker not only repeats the famous words of Mr. Spock from Star Trek II: The Wrath of Khan – "The needs of the many outweigh the needs of the few..." but adds Captain Kirk's reply – "or the one".

They also licensed two Lupin III films: Lupin III: The Fuma Conspiracy and Lupin III: Legend of the Gold of Babylon. Because of legal issues surrounding the Lupin name, which was used by author Monkey Punch without permission from the estate of Maurice Leblanc, the titles were released as Rupan III, which is the romaji pronunciation of Lupin. Even after the Lupin name passed into public domain in the 1990s, they continued to distribute the films as Rupan III.

Since 2024 AnimEigo has a partnership with Anime Sugoi, which distributes their titles in the German speaking area (Germany, Austria and Switzerland).

== Productions ==
Releases are only listed if the subtitling, dubbing, or other (localization) production work was handled by AnimEigo; rather than being licensed or redistributed from prior versions.

=== In print ===
In print
Title	Release		Medium	Dub producer	Notes
Title	Subtitle	Dub	Medium	Dub producer	Notes
A.D. Police Files	1993	1995	Show (3)	Southwynde Studios	Alternate dub
Bubblegum Crash	1992	1994	Show (3)	Southwynde Studios	
Bubblegum Crisis	1991	1994	Show (8)	Southwynde Studios	
Bushido		—	Movie	—	
Eleven Samurai		—	Movie	—	
Graveyard of Honor (1975)		—	Movie	—	
Metal Skin Panic: MADOX-01	1990	1995	Show (1)	Swirl Films	Alternate dub
Onimasa		—	Movie	—	
Otaku no Video	1993	—	Show (2)	—	
Revenge		—	Movie	—	
Revenge of a Kabuki Actor		—	Movie	—	
Samurai Vendetta		—	Movie	—	
Shinobi no Mono		—	Movie	—	
Shinobi no Mono 2: Vengeance		—	Movie	—	
Shinobi no Mono 3: Resurrection		—	Movie	—	
Shinsengumi Chronicles		—	Movie	—	
Sleepy Eyes of Death 1: The Chinese Jade		—	Movie	—	
Sleepy Eyes of Death 2: Sword of Adventure		—	Movie	—	
Sleepy Eyes of Death 3: Full Circle Killing		—	Movie	—	
Sleepy Eyes of Death 4: Sword of Seduction		—	Movie	—	
Sleepy Eyes of Death 5: Sword of Fire		—	Movie	—	
Sleepy Eyes of Death 6: Sword of Satan		—	Movie	—	
Sword of Desperation		—	Movie	—	
The Blind Menace		—	Movie	—	
The Clone Returns Home		—	Movie	—	
The Dagger of Kamui	1995	—	Movie	—	
The Great Samurai		—	Movie	—	
The Loyal 47 Ronin		—	Movie	—	
The Samurai I Loved		—	Movie	—	
The Secret of the Urn		—	Movie	—	
Vampire Princess Miyu (OVA)		1996	Show (4)	Swirl Films	Alternate dub
You're Under Arrest (OVA)	1995	1995	Show (4)	Coastal Studios	

=== Out of print ===
Out of print
Title	Release		Medium	Dub producer	Notes
Title	Subtitle	Dub	Medium	Dub producer	Notes
13 Assassins (1963)		—	Movie	—	
Arcadia of My Youth	1993	—	Movie	—	
Ashura		2007	Movie	Coastal Studios	
Baoh: The Visitor	1995	1995	Show (1)	Coastal Studios	
Battle Royal High School	1996	1996	Show (1)	Southwynde Studios	
Battle of Okinawa		—	Movie	—	
Black Rain		—	Movie	—	
Crusher Joe: The Movie	1997	1997	Movie	Coastal Studios	Alternate dub
Crusher Joe: The OVAs	1997	1998	Show (2)	Coastal Studios	
Genesis Survivor Gaiarth	1993	1995	Show (3)	Swirl Films	
Growing Up With Hello Kitty		2012	Short (16)	Coastal Studios	12 episodes dubbed
It's Tough Being a Man		—	Movie	—	
Kimagure Orange Road		—	Show (48)	—	
Kimagure Orange Road OVA		—	Show (8)	—	
Kimagure Orange Road: The Motion Picture		—	Movie	—	
Lupin III: The Fuma Conspiracy	1995	1995	Movie	Coastal Studios	AKA Rupan III: The Fuma Conspiracy
Miyamoto Musashi		—	Movie	—	
Oh My Goddess!	1994	2001	Show (5)	Coastal Studios	
Shogun Assassin 3: Slashing Blades of Carnage		2007	Movie	Coastal Studios	
Shogun Assassin 4: Five Fistfuls of Gold		2008	Movie	Coastal Studios	
Shogun Assassin 5: Cold Road to Hell		2008	Movie	Coastal Studios	
Shōnan Bakusozoku		—	Show (13)	—	3 episodes subtitled
Spirit of Wonder: Miss China's Ring	1996	1996	Show (1)	Coastal Studios	
The Ballad of Narayama		—	Movie	—	
The Geisha		—	Movie	—	
The Razor		—	Movie	—	
The Razor 2		—	Movie	—	
The Razor 3		—	Movie	—	
The Wolves		—	Movie	—	
Tora-san, His Tender Love		—	Movie	—	
Tora-san's Cherished Mother		—	Movie	—	
Tora-san's Grand Scheme		—	Movie	—	
Urusei Yatsura (Those Obnoxous Aliens)	1992-2006	1995	Show (195)	Southwynde Studios	2 episodes dubbed Alternate dub
Urusei Yatsura 1: Only You	1995	2003	Movie	Swirl Films	
Urusei Yatsura 3: Remember My Love	1995	2004	Movie	Swirl Films	
Urusei Yatsura 4: Lum the Forever	1995	2004	Movie	Swirl Films	
Urusei Yatsura 5: The Final Chapter	1995	2004	Movie	Swirl Films	
Urusei Yatsura 6: Always My Darling	1996	2005	Movie	Swirl Films	
Wakeful Nights		—	Movie	—	
Yawara! A Fashionable Judo Girl		—	Show (124)	—	40 episodes subtitled
You're Under Arrest (TV)	2002	2002	Show (47)	Coastal Studios	
Zatoichi meets Yojimbo		—	Movie	—	
Zatoichi the Outlaw		—	Movie	—	
