= Dark Rose Valkyrie =

2016 video game

- Developer: Compile Heart
- Publisher: Idea Factory
- Artist: Kōsuke Fujishima
- Writer: Takumi Miyajima
- Platforms: PlayStation 4 Microsoft Windows
- Release: PlayStation 4: JP: July 21, 2016; NA: June 6, 2017; EU: June 9, 2017; Microsoft Windows: WW: April 10, 2018
- Genre: Role-playing
- Mode: Single-player

Dark Rose Valkyrie (Note: Japanese: クロバラノワルキューレ, Hepburn: Kurobara no Warukyūre [= Walküre]) is a Japanese role-playing video game developed by Compile Heart and published by Idea Factory. The game contains key staff from Bandai Namco's Tales series of video games, including character designer Kōsuke Fujishima, and scenario writer Takumi Miyajima. The game was released for PlayStation 4 in Japan in July 2016 and in North American and Europe in June 2017. A Windows version was released worldwide in April 2018.

== Gameplay ==
The game plays as a Japanese role-playing game, but also includes visual novel segments where the player must interview characters to identify a potential traitor among the player's party of characters. Similar to gameplay mechanics found in Ace Attorney and Danganronpa games, the player must review statements from characters and try to identify contradictions in their accounts of events.

== Story ==
The game takes place in an alternate history version of Taisho era Japan in 1929 dealing with the repercussions of a fallen meteorite named the "Black Garnet". The meteorite starts the spread of a disease called "Chimera", which causes people to turn into dangerous and destructive creatures, leading to the death of 3% of the world's population and the infection of many more. The player takes control of the character of Asahi, a member of the "Special Force Valkyrie" ordered to eradicate the Chimera-infected people to stop the spread of the virus.

== Development ==
The game was first announced in February 2016 in an issue of Weekly Famitsu under the name Black Rose Valkyrie. The game was initially scheduled for release on June 30 in Japan, but was later delayed almost a month to July 21, to improve the game's quality. In November, Idea Factory announced they would be releasing the game in English in North America and Europe in the first half of 2017, under the new name Dark Rose Valkyrie. The change in name was largely due to copyright issues in English regions.

The game features staff from Namco Bandai's long-running Tales series, including character designer Kōsuke Fujishima, and scenario writer Takumi Miyajima, both of which notably worked together on Tales of Symphonia and Tales of the Abyss.

A limited edition of Dark Rose Valkyrie was released by Idea Factory International in 2017.

== Reception ==
Reception

Aggregate score
Aggregator	Score
Metacritic	58/100

Review scores
Publication	Score
Destructoid	4/10
Hardcore Gamer	3/5
Push Square	4/10

Dark Rose Valkyrie received "mixed or average" reviews, according to review aggregator Metacritic.

Destructoid gave the game a 4 out of 10, writing: "Even though Compile Heart had a couple interesting ideas with this game, its execution failed to bring out its true potential". Push Square awarded it the same score and wrote: "Weak concepts and a suite of poorly crafted gameplay systems sink an otherwise semi-interesting premise. This is a frustrating and slow slog all the way to the end". Hardcore Gamer reviewed the game more positively: "The pacing makes it difficult to fully get immersed into the story and outside of the interview portion, the gameplay does not live up to its potential, especially in battle. The result is an overall good but unremarkable JRPG".

In the game's debut week in Japan, it was the third best-selling new game, and fourth best-selling overall, selling 12,682 copies at retail.
