= The Special Duty Combat Unit Shinesman =

Japanese OVA (original video animation) series

- Cover art from the English-language 1996 DVD release of the series by Anime Works.

特務戦隊シャインズマン (Tokumu Sentai Shainzuman)
- Genre: Comedy, Science Fiction
- Manga
- Written by: Kaimu Tachibana
- Published by: Gakken, Futabasha
- Magazine: Comic NORA
- Original run: 1993 – 1998
- Volumes: 9
- Original video animation
- Directed by: Shinya Sadamitsu
- Produced by: Yumiko Ōnishi; Mitsuhisa Ishikawa; Kōji Yoritsune; Yumiko Masujima
- Written by: Hideki Sonoda
- Music by: Yoshihiro Ike
- Studio: Production I.G
- Released: February 21, 1996
- Runtime: 28 minutes (each episode)
- Episodes: 2

The Special Duty Combat Unit Shinesman (特務戦隊シャインズマン, Tokumu Sentai Shainzuman) is a Japanese anime OVA of two episodes. It was released in Japan on February 21, 1996. It is based on the Manga comic art of Kaimu Tachibana and Hideki Sonoda, and directed by Shinya Sadamitsu. The character designer was Akiharu Ishii. The video was produced by Gakken, Aniplex, and Movic. The film has been dubbed into English by Media Blasters, and released on DVD in North America.

== Inspiration and concept ==
The Special Duty Combat Unit Shinesman video is a parody of the famous Super Sentai series of Tokusatsu programs. The king of the alien planet, "Voice", has declared war against Earth. However, the war takes a peculiar form; it is a war of "Big Business". The king's plan is to send Prince Sasaki and his strategist, Seki, to Earth, in order to form a corporation which is large enough to rule Earth. The corporation would fund a television series titled "Greatman" and control its marketing. Earth, however, has The Special Duty Combat Unit Shinesman, a team of heroes ready to fight back. The opposing corporation, the "Right Trading Company" has created the Shinesman team along the lines of the superhero television programs of their day. The team of heroes includes: Shinesman Red, Shinesman Sepia, Shinesman Moss Green, Shinesman Salmon Pink, and Shinesman Gray. The heroes use weapons such as "Business Card Cutters" and "Tie Clip Bombs" to fight the aliens.

== Characters ==
The characters were created with particular well known Japanese actors in mind to voice them, both initially, and if a series was filmed. Moreover, the characters were given names to represent these actors.

=== Right Trading Company ===
==== Hiroya Matsumoto / Shinesman Red ====
Matsumoto is a young man devoted to his little brother, Yota. Yota is a fan of the "Greatman" TV show, particularly the character, Greatman Red. Matsumoto joins the Right Trading Company because his father was a loyal company employee. He is shocked to learn he must wear a superhero costume, called a "pro-suit", himself. During his job interview, Kyoko Sakakibara asks what color superhero he should like to be. Matsumoto remembers Yota's preference for Greatman Red, and chooses "red". As a curiosity, he shares his name with a real-life actor who is a Super Sentai alumnus, having played Tsubasa Ozu/Magi Yellow in Mahou Sentai Magiranger and Masato Jin/Beet Buster in Tokumei Sentai Go-Busters.

==== Ryoichi Hayami / Shinesman Moss Green ====
Hayami is somewhat popular with women; a "ladies' man". He helps Matsumoto to learn the ways of the Right Trading Company.

==== Shogo Yamadera / Shinesman Grey ====
Yamadera loves his car, a Montero. He becomes very anxious if someone else is working on it. He believes his color, grey, represents regal manliness.

==== Shotaro Ono / Shinesman Sepia ====
Ono is a devoted husband and father. He loves his little girl, Tamari. He keeps her photo on his desk and buys her a fish soft toy. He is unimpressed by the team's weapons.

==== Riko Hidaka / Shinesman Salmon Pink ====
Hidaka is the only female in the team. Although she is an office girl she objects to being sent to get things from cigarettes to coffee. She tends to accidentally break things by crushing them.

==== Kyoko Sakakibara ====
Sakakibara is the Manager of Human Resources at the Good Trading Company. She is also the team's deputy leader. She fantasizes about being a Shinesman herself one day. She dislikes the color of four of the team. Her assistant is Tsukasa Nakamura.

==== Hitomi Kasahara/Lafure ====
Kasahara is a sweet-natured and timid secretary who is actually from Voice. She came to Earth in search of her brother, who disappeared. Only Sakakibara knows her secret.

=== Antagonists ===
==== Prince Suguru Sasaki ====
Sasaki leads the alien attack on Earth. Despite his leading role, Sasaki is angry at having to pose as a corporate employee. He is also unhappy to be working with his cousin, Shiina.

==== Prince Akihito Seki ====
Seki is Lafure's brother. They are from Voice. Seki once opposed Voice's invasion of Earth. He was brainwashed and now joins Sasaki's mission. He has also forgotten his sister, so when Seki meets Hitomi/Lafure, he assumes that she is a spy. This particular plot point has not been resolved (see the notes below).

==== Princess Shiina ====
Shiina is Sakaki's excitable and ditzy cousin. She never shows any bare skin to men as she states, she would have to 'marry or kill' them. Sakaki is annoyed she has come on his mission. Shiina falls in love with Matsumoto/Shinesman Red and starts to oppose Voice's invasion of Earth. Shiina appears only as an anime character. However, she is drawn in manga form for the accompanying drama CD.

=== Voice cast ===
Cast
Character	Japanese	English
Hiroya Matsumoto (Shinesman Red)	Yasunori Matsumoto	Scott Simpson
Kyoko Sakakibara	Ryoko Sakakibara	Traci Dinwiddie
Yota Matsumoto	Rika Matsumoto	Nick Prange
Ryoichi Hayami (Shinesman Moss Green)	Shou Hayami	David Wade
Shogo Yamadera (Shinesman Gray)	Kouichi Yamadera	Rick Forrester
Riko Hidaka (Shinesman Salmon Pink)	Hiroko Kasahara	Tamara Burnham-Mercer
Shotaro Ono (Shinesman Sepia)	Ken'ichi Ono	Justin Smith
Tsukasa Nakamura	Taiju Nakamura	Ed Cord
Hitomi Kasahara (Lafure)	Hiroko Kasahara	Juliet Cesario
Prince Suguru Sasaki	Nozomu Sasaki	Gray Hawks
Prince Akihito Seki	Toshihiko Seki	Michael Granberry
Princess Shiina	Hekiru Shiina	Pamela Weidner
Greatman Red	Kazunobu Chiba	Marc Matney
Secretary	Hiroko Konishi	Kristen Graf

== Reception ==
The film was received with mixed reviews. Despite its short length, it has a fan base, especially for the dubbed version. Some appreciated the comedy elements of the program, others less so.
