= Kōsuke Fujishima =

Japanese manga artist

Kōsuke Fujishima (藤島 康介, Fujishima Kōsuke; born July 7, 1964) is a Japanese manga artist and character designer. He has created several manga series, the best known of which are You're Under Arrest! and Oh My Goddess!. Fujishima is known for his love of automobiles and motorcycles, which is reflected in many of his series.

He is also known for being a character designer for several video games, including those from the Tales series and the first five games from Sakura Wars.

== Early life ==
Kōsuke Fujishima was born in Chiba, Japan.

== Career ==
Fujishima first came to public attention as an editor of Puff magazine, his first job after completing high school. Fujishima originally intended to be a draftsman, but took the editorial role after failing to get a drafting apprenticeship. He later became an assistant to manga artist Tatsuya Egawa in the production of the Making Be Free! manga, and in 1986 began his first original manga series You're Under Arrest. His second manga series Oh My Goddess!, also translated as Ah! My Goddess, is Fujishima's most famous work, which made him a household name in Japan. He is also well known as the character designer for several games in the Tales series and Sakura Wars.

=== Personal life ===
On June 29, 2016, the famous 20-year-old cosplayer Nekomu Otogi announced her marriage to Fujishima as well as her pregnancy on her Twitter page. Both of them had known each other on Twitter approximately since 2014.

On July 7, 2016, Fujishima confirmed the marriage on his Twitter account.

Fujishima owns a rare Krauser Domani, a motorcycle-like vehicle with an integrated sidecar, which he purchased in 1994, and regularly shows on his Twitter account.

== Works ==
Series	Year	Contribution
You're Under Arrest	1986–1992	Author / Illustrator
Oh My Goddess!	1988–2014	Author / Illustrator
Kōryū Densetsu Villgust	1992	Character designer
Tales of Phantasia	1994, 1999, 2003, 2006	Character designer
Sakura Wars	1996–2005	Character designer
éX-Driver	2000	Author / Character and setting designer
Tales of Phantasia: Narikiri Dungeon	2000, 2010	Character designer
Piano: The Melody of a Young Girl's Heart	2002	Original creator / Character designer
Gungrave	2002, 2003, 2004	Mechanical designer
Tales of the World: Summoner's Lineage	2003	Character designer
Tales of Symphonia	2003, 2004	Character designer
Tales of the Abyss	2005	Character designer
Tales of Vesperia	2008	Character designer
Paradise Residence	2008–2016	Author / Illustrator
Tales of Xillia	2011	Character designer
Tales of Xillia 2	2012	Character designer
Tales of Zestiria	2015	Character designer
Tales of Berseria	2016	Character designer
Black Rose Valkyrie	2016	Character designer
Toppu GP	2016–present	Author / Illustrator
Tales of Crestoria	2020–2022	Character designer
