= Mazda Suitcase Car =

Prototype suitcase car

Overview
- Manufacturer: Mazda
- Production: 1991
- Designer: Yoshimi Kanemoto

Body and chassis
- Platform: Suitcase, Pocketbike

Powertrain
- Engine: Komatsu Zenoah G3K 33.6cc trimmer motor producing 1.7 horsepower
- Propulsion: Two-stroke engine

The Mazda Suitcase Car was a prototype suitcase vehicle created in 1991 by the Mazda company. The suitcase opened up to reveal a functioning three-wheeled gasoline-powered vehicle with working lights. The vehicle, which resembled a go-kart, was created by Mazda engineers and showcased in the United States and Europe at auto shows.

== Background ==
The Mazda Suitcase Car never made it to production; it was built for car shows in Europe and the United States. The idea for the car came from Mazda engineer Yoshimi Kanemoto.

In 1991 a select group of seven engineers from Mazda’s manual transmission testing and research group including Kanemoto, created the vehicle for an internal company contest called Fantasyard. The contest challenged employees from different departments to design a creative product which is a moving machine.

The car had stubby fold-out handlebars with a twistgrip throttle like a motorcycle, a disk brake for the rear, a differential for wide turns, and three wheels (one in the front middle and two on the outer sides). The front and rear frames locked together to make the suitcase more rigid for when operating

The cost to build the prototype was US$5,000. In 1992 The Associated Press published a photo of a Mazda executive driving the suitcase car through Times Square ahead of the 16 April 1992 New York International Automobile Show.

== Description ==
The suitcase weighed 32 kg (71 lb) and it was 57 cm × 75 cm (22.4 by 29.5 inches). The design began with a Samsonite suitcase and a pocket bike. The power plant was a 33.6cc 1.3 kW (1.7 hp) two-stroke engine. The suitcase car was designed to go up to 30 km/h (19 mph). There were slots in the case where the rear wheel axles could protrude and a slot through the case for a front wheel.

The original "Green and Red" was equipped with just brake lights but the "American themed" and its successors the "Blue and black racing stripe" were equipped with turn signals and brake lights. The car also had a throttle, disc brakes, differential, headlights, foot pegs and a horn. No tools were needed to assemble the vehicle.

== Legacy ==
There were only technically two known examples of the car but it is thought that there is only one original Mazda Suitcase Car left.

The first "Original Green and Red" prototype suitcase car was accidentally destroyed after the 1991 Fantasyard event.

The second "American-themed" suitcase that was featured at the 1992 New York International Automobile Show, as well as an appearance on The Oprah Winfrey Show, was crashed during a demonstration.

After the crash, a brave individual took it upon himself to resurrect the crashed "American-themed" suitcase and created the well known "Black and blue racing stripe"
