= Sachie Hara =

Japanese actress and model

Sachie Hara (原沙知絵)
- Born: May 1, 1978 (age 48); Fukuoka, Japan
- Height: 1.73 m (5 ft 8 in)

Sachie Hara (原 沙知絵, Hara Sachie; born May 1, 1978 in Fukuoka, Fukuoka, Japan) is a Japanese actress and model under the management of the Ken-On Group. She is best known for her roles in Doramas, including films You're Under Arrest, Omizu no Hanamichi, and Shichinin no Onna Bengoshi.

== Career ==
Hara started appearing in magazines and TV commercials after being scouted as a model in 1996. She made her acting debut one year later in Beach Boys with Takashi Sorimachi. She took on various supporting roles before winning the lead role in the 2000 NTV drama, Cinderella wa Nemuranai.

Hara’s first film role was with Yukie Nakama and Hideaki Itō in the 2001 film Love Song. In the same year, she appeared with Yūko Takeuchi and SMAP leader Masahiro Nakai in the TV medical drama, Shiroi Kage.

In 2002, she had to learn sign language to prepare for her role as a deaf-mute in Shiawase no Shippo. Hara was then cast as Miyuki Kobayakawa in the live action version of You're Under Arrest. In 2005 she was cast alongside Yūki Amami and Mirai Shida in the dark grade school drama, Jyoou no Kyoushitsu.

In 2005 alone, she appeared in five films, including Hinokio and Semishigure. She made her first voice acting performance in the critically acclaimed Japanese animated film, Toki wo Kakeru Shoujo in 2006.

On April 25, 2007, NHK announced that Hara would be part of its 77th Asadora, Chiritotechin. Hara’s role as freelance writer Natsuko Ogata in Chiritotechin was her first in a morning drama, and her longest, as the series ran for 151 episodes from October 1, 2007 to March 29, 2008.

She often works with Kazushige Nagashima, Zaizen Naomi, Emi Wakui, Hideaki Itō, Yōko Nogiwa, and Yumiko Shaku, and is often cast as a teacher, lawyer, or nurse.

She usually appears in TV dramas and specials, variety shows and cultural events. She also remains active as endorser. Aside from co-starring with Hiroshi Abe in Sekisuiheim commercials, she is also doing promotional work for energy drink Lipovitan Fine (with Shun Oguri).

== Filmography ==
=== Movies ===
Year	Title	Role
2001	Love Song	
2005	Mail de Todoita Monogatari	
2005	Irasshaimase, Kanja-sama	
2005	Hinokio	Natsuko Fubuki
2005	Semishigure	
2005	Madamada Abunai Deka	Ryoko Misaki
2006	Toki wo kakeru Shoujo	Kazuko Yoshiyama (voice)
2007	Smile Seiya no Kiseki	actress (cameo)
2008	Postman	Naoko Tsukahara
2009	Love Letters at Sixty	Natsumi

=== TV shows ===
Year	Title	Role	Network
1997	Beach Boys	Hazuki Terao	Fuji TV
1997	Eve ~Santa Claus Dreaming		Fuji TV
1997	Odoru daisosasen - Nenmatsu tokubetsu keikai Special		Fuji TV
1998	With Love	Midori	Fuji TV
1998	Sekai de Ichiban Papa ga Suki		Fuji TV
1998	Sommelier	Kaori	Fuji TV
1999	Omizu no Hanamichi	Aya	Fuji TV
1999	To Heart	Kaoru	TBS
1999	Out ~ Tsumatachi no Hanzai	Yayoi Yamamoto	Fuji TV
2000	Cinderella wa Nemuranai	Yoko Hashimoto	NTV
2000	Ai wo Kudasai	Shindo	Fuji TV
2001	Shiroi Kage	Mikiko Gyoda	TBS
2001	Shin Omizu no Hanamichi	Aya	Fuji TV
2001	Sekai de Ichiban Atsui Natsu	Ryoko Enomoto	TBS
2001	Shitto no Kaori	Chieko Hagiwara (ep6-)	TV Asahi
2002	Shiawase No Shippo	Syouko Kayano	TBS
2002	You're Under Arrest	Miyuki Kobayakawa	TV Asahi
2003	Shiroi Kage SP	Mikiko Gyoda	TBS
2003	Diamond Girl	Shiori Sonoda	Fuji TV
2003	Hakusen Nagashi ~25-sai	Misato Yoshikawa	Fuji TV
2003	Yumemiru Budou		NHK
2004	Denchi ga Kireru Made	Wakaba Mizushima	TV Asahi
2004	Water Boys 2	Kiwako Ashikawa (ep10-12)	Fuji TV
2004	Order Made ~Shiawase Iro no Shinshi Fuku Mise~	(eps2-3)	NHK
2005	The Queen's Classroom	Shiori Tendo	NTV
2005	Hakusen Nagashi ~Yume Miru Goro wo Sugitemo	Misato Yoshikawa	Fuji TV
2005	Aibou 4	Hana Sugishita (ep16)	TV Asahi
2006	Tsugaru Kaikyo Mystery Koro	(Part 5)	Fuji TV
2006	Ranbo	Kana Watanabe	NTV
2006	Shichinin no Onna Bengoshi	Taeko Ijima	TV Asahi
2006	Kaigo Etoile	Yoko Baba	NHK
2006	Isshou Wasurenai Monogatari	Madoka Taniguchi	TV Asahi
2006	Kamisama Kara Hitokoto	Yuri Shishido	WOWOW
2007	Saga no Gabai-baachan		Fuji TV
2007	Hissatsu Shigotonin 2007	Kaoru	TV Asahi
2007	Chiritotechin	Natsuko Ogata	NHK
2007	Ten to Sen	Otoki	TV Asahi
2008	Shichinin no Onna Bengoshi 2	Taeko Ijima	TV Asahi
2008	Shokatsu Keiji 4		Fuji TV
2008	Hitmaker Aku Yu Monogatari		NTV
2008	Omiya-san	(ep1)	TV Asahi
2008	Giragira	Momoko Nanase	TV Asahi
2008	Saigo no Senpan	Shizuko Yoshimura	NHK
2009	Meitantei: Asami Mitsuhiko	Sumiko Yoshida	TBS
2009	Toshi Densetsu Sepia	Kumiko (Shisha Koi)	Wowow
2009	Keishicho Sosa Ikka 9 Gakari 4	Masumi Hayasegawa	TV Asahi
2009	Koshonin SP	Natsuno Nozaki	TV Asahi
2020	The Fugitive	Yayoi Kashiwagi	TV Asahi
2023	Seasoned Connections	Akemi Atari	Fuji TV

=== Endorsements ===
- Lipovitan Fine
- Sekisuiheim
- Suntory
- Brother printers
