= Via Chem Group =

Via Chem Group, a.s.
- Founded: 2002
- Headquarters: České Budějovice, Czech Republic
- Key people: Petr Sisák
- Total assets: ▼687 mio. CZK (2012)
- Total equity: ▼ -543 mio. CZK (2012)
- Parent: Euro Capital Alliance
- Subsidiaries: STZ Development

Via Chem Group, a.s. (VCG) is a Czech holding company owned by Euro Capital Alliance registered on the British Virgin Islands. In 2003 VCG acquired 8.8% stake in chemical producer Spolek pro chemickou a hutní výrobu (Spolchemie). In 2005 VCG acquired further 39% of Spolchemie shares and in early 2006 increased its stake to 62.6%. Spolchemie is a major Czech producer of chlorine.

In 2008 VCG acquired selected assets of SETUZA and got approval of a bond issue amounting to CZK 1.2 bn payable on 1 October 2013. The number of employees increased to 1,442. In 2009 VCG sold a part of acquired SETUZA assets to Archer Daniels Midland and in 2011 another part to Glencore. In 2012 VCG acquired bankrupt Slovak company Novácke chemické závody (NCZ). Part of NCZ assets is leased to Energochemica.

Via Chem Group failed to pay the bonds on 1 October 2013 and was declared insolvent.
