= You're Under Arrest (manga) =

Manga series and its adaptations

- First tankōbon volume cover, featuring Miyuki Kobayakawa and Natsumi Tsujimoto

逮捕しちゃうぞ (Taiho Shichauzo)
- Genre: Action; Buddy cop
- Manga
- Written by: Kōsuke Fujishima
- Published by: Kodansha
- English publisher: NA: Dark Horse Comics (select chapters)
- Imprint: Party KC
- Magazine: Morning; (1986−1989); Morning Party Zōkan; (1989−1992)
- Original run: 1986 – 1992
- Volumes: 7
Further information
Original video animation
Directed by	Kazuhiro Furuhashi
Produced by	Yoshimasa Mio; Shigeru Watanabe; Naoki Sei; Hiroshi Hasegawa
Written by	Michiru Shimada (#1); Michiko Yokote (#2–4)
Music by	Kow Otani
Studio	Studio Deen
Licensed by	NA: AnimEigo (1999–2012)
Released	September 24, 1994 – November 25, 1995
Runtime	30 minutes each
Episodes	4
Anime television series
Directed by	Hiroshi Watanabe; Junji Nishimura
Produced by	Tetsuo Genshō; Hiroyuki Fukumoto; Kazunori Noguchi
Written by	Hiroshi Watanabe
Music by	Yasunori Iwasaki; Kow Otani
Studio	Studio Deen
Licensed by	NA: AnimEigo (1999–2012)
Original network	TBS
English network	SEA: AXN; US: Primo TV
Original run	November 2, 1996 – September 27, 1997
Episodes	47
Anime television series
You're Under Arrest Special
Directed by	Junji Nishimura
Produced by	Yoshiyuki Ochiai; Tetsuo Genshō
Written by	Junji Nishimura et al
Music by	Yasunori Iwasaki; Kow Otani
Studio	Studio Deen
Licensed by	NA: ADV Films (2003–2009)
Original network	TBS
Original run	March 29, 1999 – April 29, 1999
Episodes	21
Anime film
You're Under Arrest: The Movie
Directed by	Junji Nishimura
Produced by	Ken Matsumoto; Tetsuo Genshō; Kazunori Noguchi
Written by	Masashi Sogo
Music by	Kenji Kawai
Studio	Studio Deen
Licensed by	NA: ADV Films (2003–2009)
Released	April 24, 1999
Runtime	92 minutes
Video game
Developer	Pioneer LDC
Publisher	Pioneer LDC
Genre	Adventure
Platform	PlayStation
Released	March 29, 2001
Anime television series
You're Under Arrest 2
Directed by	Shogo Koumoto
Produced by	Satoshi Kawano; Kazunori Noguchi
Written by	Michiko Yokote
Music by	Kow Otani; Yasunori Iwasaki
Studio	Studio Deen
Licensed by	NA: Sentai Filmworks
Original network	TBS
English network	NA: Anime Network; SEA: AXN
Original run	April 7, 2001 – September 29, 2001
Episodes	26
Original video animation
Directed by	Shogo Koumoto
Written by	Gō Tamai
Music by	Kow Otani; Yasunori Iwasaki
Studio	Studio Deen
Licensed by	NA: Sentai Filmworks
Released	April 25, 2002
Runtime	30 minutes
Television drama
Directed by	Fumiro Igarashi; Kazuhiro Furuhashi; Shōgo Kawamoto
Produced by	Hiroshi Akabane; Toyohiko Wada; Jun Akiyama; Takuya Nakagome
Written by	Tetsuya Oishi; Seigo Kashida
Studio	AVEC
Original network	TV Asahi
Original run	October 17, 2002 – December 12, 2002
Episodes	9
Anime television series
You're Under Arrest: Full Throttle
Directed by	Koichi Ohata
Produced by	Gō Tanaka; Haruto Nakayoshi; Masayuki Hario; Kōji Iijima; Hirokazu Matsunaga
Written by	Natsuko Takahashi
Music by	Hideyuki Fukasawa; Masara Nishida
Studio	Studio Deen
Licensed by	NA: Sentai Filmworks
Original network	TBS
Original run	October 4, 2007 – March 27, 2008
Episodes	24
- icon

You're Under Arrest (Japanese: 逮捕しちゃうぞ, Hepburn: Taiho Shichauzo) is a Japanese manga series written and illustrated by Kōsuke Fujishima. It was serialized in Kodansha's seinen manga magazines Morning Party Zōkan and Morning from 1986 through 1992. It centers on a fictional police station in Sumida, Tokyo, as its officers tackle everyday criminals while keeping people safe.

The chapters of You're Under Arrest have been collected in seven tankōbon volumes by Kodansha. The manga has been adapted into three television seasons, three OVA series and a film, all animated by Studio Deen. The series also spawned a live-action drama special starring Misaki Ito and Sachie Hara. The show has received positive reviews from critics.

== Story ==
The series follows Natsumi Tsujimoto and Miyuki Kobayakawa, two female officers of the Tokyo Metropolitan Police Department. They are stationed at the fictional Bokuto Police Station located at Sumida, Tokyo. The series is largely episodic, and it focuses on the interaction between the main characters and the humorous supporting cast.

The majority of the series takes place in the Greater Tokyo Area. However, the site where the Bokuto Police Station is supposed to be does not exist in the Sumida Ward. In reality, the Bokuto Hospital takes its place.

== Media ==
=== Manga ===
The English version of the manga was published by Dark Horse Comics, which only contained selected episodes from volumes 6 and 7 (reportedly at Fujishima's request, resulting in continuity confusion by some fans of the series). The final frame of the last Japanese volume refers to a You're Under Arrest 2, which has not yet been serialized.

A special one-shot chapter, titled "You're Under Arrest GP" (逮捕しちゃうぞGP, Taiho Shichauzo GP), appeared in Kodansha's seinen manga magazine Monthly Afternoon on December 23, 2022. It is a crossover with Fujishima's other manga series, Toppu GP, and compiled in that series' twelfth volume.

==== Original release ====
No.	Japanese release date	Japanese ISBN
1	December 17, 1987	4-06-315001-1
File.1: "The Fearless and Explosive Police Ladies" (怖い物知らずの爆風婦人警官, Kowai Mono Shirazu no Bakufū Fujin Keikan); File.2: "Don't Trash the Violation Tickets" (反則キップは破らないで, Hansoku Kippu wa Yaburanai de); File.3: "Big Shower Room Incident" (シャワールーム騒乱事件, Shawā Rūmu Sōran Jiken); File.4: "A Salute to an Arrogant Bike Cop!" (傲慢白バイ警官に敬礼!, Gōman Shirobai Keikan ni Keirei!); File.5: "Dash into Fire" (とんで火にいる, Tonde Hi ni Iru); File.6: "Tracking the Bomber" (追跡ボンバー, Tsuiseki Bonbā); File.7: "Invincible Old Lady on a Moped" (完全無敵の原付おばさん, Kanzen Muteki no Gentsuki Oba-san); File.8: "Search for the Bike Thieves" (バイク窃盗団をさがせ, Baiku Settō-dan wo Sagase); File.9: "Found 80,000,000 Yen!" (8千万円みーつけ!, Hassen Man-en Mitsuke!); File.10: "Regretless Driver's Safety Seminar" (さっぱりと交通安全講習会, Sapparito Kōtsū Anzen Kōshū Kai); File.11: "Very Desperate Love Confession" (愛の告白は命がけ, Ai no Kokuhaku wa Inochigake); File.12: "Yosaku Will Cut the Tree" (与作が木を切る, Yosaku ga Ki wo Kiru); File.13: "Extremely Lucky Weather Conditions" (すごくツイてる絶好調日和, Sugoku Tsuiteru Zekkōchō Biyori); File.14: "The Day Miyuki got Angry" (美幸が怒った日, Miyuki ga Okotta Hi); File.15: "Natsumi-type Spirit Controlling Method" (夏美式精神改造法, Natsumi-shiki Seishin Kaizō-hō); File.16: "Nemesis: Thief No. 704 Appears" (宿敵･怪盗704号登場, Shukuteki: Kaitō Nanahyakuyon-gō Tōjō); File.17: "Female Attitude Match" (女は態度で勝負する, Onna wa Taido de Shōbu Suru); File.18: "Bokuto Station Arm Wrestling Match to Win Natsumi" (墨東署夏美争奪大腕相撲大会, Bokutō-sho Natsumi Sōdatsu Dai Udezumou Taikai); Special Issue: "GOOD MORNING! NATSUMI&MIYUKI: Natsumi and Miyuki's Private Life" (GOOD MORNING! NATSUMI&MIYUKI ～夏実と美幸のプライベート・ライフ～, GOOD MORNING! NATSUMI&MIYUKI: Natsumi to Miyuki no Puraibēto Raifu)
2	June 23, 1988	4-06-315003-8
File.19: "Fox Hunting" (フォックスハンティング, Fokkusu Hantingu); File.20: "The Roar and Power of Making Lunch" (怒号とパワーの弁当作り, Do-gō to Pawā no Bentō-tsukuri); File.21: "Thief No. 704 Strikes Back" (怪盗704号の逆襲, Kaitō Nanahyakuyon-gō no Gyakushū); File.22: "The Old Man Tunes Up Without Asking" (問答無用のチューンアップじいさん, Mondō Muyō no Chūn Appu Jī-san); File.23: "Traffic Control Under Hot Weather" (炎天下の交通整理, Entenka no Kōtsū Seiri); File.24: "Horror Night" (ホラーナイト, Horā Naito); File.25: "Finding Runaway People Under Hot Weather" (炎天下の家出人探し, Entenka no Iede Hitosagashi); File.26: "Mysterious Luce Rotary Coupe Car Incident" (妖車ルーチェ･ロータリークーペ事件, Ayatashisha Rūche Rōtarī Kūpe Jiken); File.27: "Heavy Rain, Strong Wind, and Finally, Perfect Weather" (豪雨、強風、後、快晴, Gōu, Kyōfū, Ato, Kaisei); File.28: "Underground Food Regeneration Strategy!" (地下食再生作戦！, Chika Shoku Saisei Sakusen!); File.29: "Chase the Red BMW!" (赤いBMWを追え!, Akai Bī Emu Daburyū wo Oe!); File.30: "The Attache Case Mystery" (謎のアタッシュケース, Nazo no Atasshu Kēsu); File.31: "10,000 Rotation MONUMENT" (１万回転のMONUMENT, Ichi-man Kaiten no MONUMENT); File.32: "Big Thunder Mountain" (ビッグ･サンダー･マウンテン, Biggu Sandā Maunten); File.33: "DIGITAL VS. ANALOGE"
3	January 23, 1989	4-06-315007-0
File.34: "GOOD MORNING! NATSUMI & MIYUKI 2"; File.35: "Poisoned(?) Juice Incident" (毒入り（?）ジュース事件, Dokiri(?) Jūsu Jiken); File.36: "Love is Energy" (恋はエナジー, Koi wa Enajī); File.37: "The DJ Disappeared - Find the 1" (消えたDJ-1を探せ, Kieta Dī Jei - Ichi wo Sagase); File.38: "Blowing the Fire From Natsumi's Face" (夏実の顔から火が吹いた, Natsumi no Kao Kara Hi ga Fuita); File.39: "A Dangerous Date" (危険なデート, Kiken na Dēto); File.40: "Spicy Love" (きわどいのがお好き, Kiwadoi no ga Osuki); File.41: "Explosive! Cannonball" (爆走! キャノンボール, Bakusō! Kyanonbōru); File.42: "Lovely Bodyguard" (すてきなボディーガード, Suteki na Bodīgādo); File.43: "A Building Demolished by a Sneeze shot" (くしゃみ一発ビル全壊, Kushami Ippatsu Biru Zenkai)
4	November 22, 1989	4-06-315012-7
File.44: "I Want to be a Policewoman" (婦警さんになりたーい, Fukei-san ni Naritai); File.45: "1/2 Day" (1/2デー, 1/2 Dē); File.46: "The Devil's Tears Love the Black Dress" (切り裂き魔は赤いドレスが好き, Kirisaki Ma wa Akai Doresu ga Suki); File.47: "Natsumi's Beer" (夏実の酒, Natsumi no Sake); File.48: "Valentine Love" (愛しのバレンタイン, Itoshi no Barentain); File.49: "The Women's Dormitory Serial Arson Incident" (女子寮連続放火事件, Joshi Ryō Renzoku Hōka Jiken); File.50: "Becoming A Motorcycle Cop" (白バイ警官になっちゃうぞ, Shirobai Keikan ni Natsuchauzo); File.51: "Being an AV Actress is Fun" (AV女優は楽しい, Ei Bī Joyū wa Tanoshī); File.52: "The Start of a Headache has Begun" (頭痛のタネがやってきた, Zutsū no Tane ga Yattekita)
5	August 23, 1990	4-06-315025-9
File.53: "A Sunny Sky, and Natsumi's Judgement" (天晴れ、夏実裁き, Ten Hare, Natsumi Sabaki); File.54: "Race Through Driving School!" (教習所を突っ走れ!, Kyōshūjo wo Tsuppashire!); File.55: "Natsumi's Car is the Super Car" (夏美の車はスーパーカー, Natsumi no Kuruma wa Sūpā Kā); File.56: "Catch the Masked Robber!" (覆面強盗を捕まえろ!, Fukumengōtō wo Tsukamaero!); File.57: "Silky Panty Collector" (シルキーパンティー･コレクター, Shirukī Pantī Korekutā); File.58: "The Christmas Tree Explosion Plan" (クリスマスツリー爆破計画, Kurisumasu Tsurī Bakuha Keikaku); File.59: "The Mysterious Kattobi Rider" (謎のかっとびライダー, Nazo no Kattobi Raidā); File.60: "Is Dad Okay?" (お父さん大丈夫?, Otōsan Daijōbu?); File.61: "Nice Shot, Aoi-chan!" (ナイスショット、葵ちゃん!, Naisu Shotto, Aoi-chan!)
6	September 21, 1991	4-06-315038-0
File.62: "Getting Revenge on the Paint Army" (ペイントアーミーに復讐を, Peinto Āmī ni Fukushū wo); File.63: "Reverse Shot! Home-Run Girl versus Strike Man" (逆転一発! ホームラン女 対 ストライク男, Gyakuten Ippatsu! Hōmu-Ran Onna tai Sutoraiku Otoko); File.64: "Out!? Strike Man's Fearsome New Special Moves!!" (出るか!? ストライク男 新必殺技の恐怖!!, Deru ka!? Sutoraiku Otoko Shin Hissawwaza no Kyōfu!!); File.65: "Deathmatch in Late Summer Heat - Tear Apart Beach Volley Man!!" (残暑の死闘 ビーチバレー男を破れ!!, Zansho no Shitō - Bīchi Barē Otoko wo Yabure!!); File.66: "Mother is 20-years old" (お母さんは20歳, Okā-san wa Nijū-sai); File.67: "Defeat!! the Santa Claus From Hell" (倒せ!! 地獄からのサンタクロース, Taose!! Jigoku Kara no Santa Kurōsu); File.68: "Fragments of a Dream" (夢のかけら, Yume no Kakera); File.69: "Spin!! Revolving Lamp of Fire (Part one)" (廻れ!! 炎の回転灯（前編）, Maware!! Honō no Kaiten-tō (Zenpen)); File.70: "Spin!! Revolving Lamp of Fire (Part two)" (廻れ!! 炎の回転灯（後編）, Maware!! Honō no Kaiten-tō (Kōhen))
7	May 23, 1992	4-06-315046-1
File.71: "The Raiding Strike Girl corps" (遊撃ストライク少女隊, Yūgeki Sutoraiku Shōjo-tai); File.72: "The Sweet Wedding Bell Trap" (ウエディングベルの甘い罠, Uedingu Beru no Amai Wana); File.73: "Yoriko-chan - Biggest Match of a Lifetime" (頼子ちゃん 一世一代の大勝負, Yoriko-chan - Isseichidai no Dai Shōbu); File.74: "Tokyo Mystery Theater" (東京ミステリー劇場, Tōkyō Misuterī Gekijō); File.75: "Little Secret of the Two" (ふたりだけの秘密, Futari Dake no Himitsu); File.76: "Aoi-chan Panic!" (葵ちゃんパニック!, Aoi-chan Panikku!); File.77: "A Magic Item" (魔法のアイテム, Mahō no Aitemu); File.78: "The Final Challenge of Today (Part one)" (トゥデイ最後の挑戦（前編）, Tōdei Saigo no Chōsen (Zenpen)); Final: "The Final Challenge of Today (Part two)" (トゥデイ最後の挑戦（後編）, Tōdei Saigo no Chōsen (Kōhen))

==== Dark Horse Comics release ====
No.	Title	English release date	English ISBN
1	The Wild Ones	October 15, 1997	978-1-56971-319-8
Issue #1: "Natsumi Makes the News" (Initially FILE.53, released December 1, 1995); Issue #1: "Racing Through Driving School" (Initially (FILE.54, released December 1, 1995); Issue #2: "Natsumi's Supercar" (Initially FILE.55, released January 1, 1996); Issue #2: "Trick or Treat" (Initially FILE.56, released January 1, 1996); Issue #3: "The Silk Panties Collector" (Initially FILE.57, released February 1, 1996); Issue #3: "The Exploding Christmas-Tree Caper" (Initially FILE.58, released February 1, 1996); Issue #4: "The Wild One" (Initially FILE.59, released March 1, 1996); Issue #4: "You Okay Dad?" (Initially FILE.60, released March 1, 1996)
2	Lights and Siren!	December 1, 1999	978-1-56971-432-4
Issue #5: "Nice Shot, Aoi!" (Initially FILE.61, released April 1, 1996); Issue #5: "Defeat of the Paintball Army" (Initially FILE.62, released April 1, 1996); Issue #6: "Strikeman vs. Home-Run Girl" (Initially FILE.63, released May 1, 1996); Issue #6: "Strikeman Returns!" (Initially FILE.64, released May 1, 1996); Issue #7: "Mom's Only Twenty?!" (Initially FILE.66, released June 1, 1996); Issue #7: "The Santa from Hell" (Initially FILE.67, released June 1, 1996); Issue #8: "Lights and Siren! Part One" (Initially FILE.69, released July 1, 1996); Issue #8: "Lights and siren! Part Two" (Initially FILE.70, released July 1, 1996)

==== First shinsōban edition ====
No.	Japanese release date	Japanese ISBN
1	April 21, 1999	978-4-06-314202-0
File.1 – File.26; Special Issue 1
2	April 21, 1999	978-4-06-314203-7
File.27 – File.41; Special Issue: "You're Under Arrest Mechanics (1)" (逮捕しちゃうぞMECHANICS（1）, Taiho Shichauzo MECHANICS (Ichi)); Special Issue: "You're Under Arrest Mechanics (2)" (逮捕しちゃうぞMECHANICS（2）, Taiho Shichauzo MECHANICS (Ni))
3	May 21, 1999	978-4-06-314205-1
File.42 – File.53; Special Issue: "You're Under Arrest Mechanics (3)" (逮捕しちゃうぞMECHANICS（3）, Taiho Shichauzo MECHANICS (San)); Special Issue: "You're Under Arrest Mechanics (4)" (逮捕しちゃうぞMECHANICS（4）, Taiho Shichauzo MECHANICS (Shi)); Special Issue: "You're Under Arrest Mechanics (5)" (逮捕しちゃうぞMECHANICS（5）, Taiho Shichauzo MECHANICS (Gō)); Special Issue: "You're Under Arrest Mechanics (6)" (逮捕しちゃうぞMECHANICS（6）, Taiho Shichauzo MECHANICS (Roku))
4	May 21, 1999	978-4-06-314206-8
File.54 – File.66; Special Issue: "You're Under Arrest Mechanics (7)" (逮捕しちゃうぞMECHANICS（7）, Taiho Shichauzo MECHANICS (Nana))
5	May 21, 1999	978-4-06-314207-5
File.67 – Final; Extra: "You Can Also be Strike Man!" (キミもストライク男になろう!, Kimi mo Sutoraiku Otoko ni Narō!); Special Issue: "You're Under Arrest Mechanics (8)" (逮捕しちゃうぞMECHANICS（8）, Taiho Shichauzo MECHANICS (Hachi)); Extra: "The Mystery of You're Under Arrest Omnibus 5" (逮捕しちゃうぞ総集編５つの謎, Taiho Shichauzo Sōshūhen Itsutsu no Nazo); Special Issue: "You're Under Arrest Mechanics (9)" (逮捕しちゃうぞMECHANICS（9）, Taiho Shichauzo MECHANICS (Kyū)); Extra 1 – Extra 2

==== Second shinsōban edition ====
No.	Japanese release date	Japanese ISBN
1	April 23, 2001	4-06-334401-0
2	April 23, 2001	4-06-334402-9
3	May 23, 2001	4-06-334406-1
4	May 23, 2001	4-06-334407-X
5	June 22, 2001	4-06-334422-3
6	June 22, 2001	4-06-334423-1

==== Bunkoban ====
No.	Japanese release date	Japanese ISBN
1	May 12, 2004	4-06-360756-9
2	June 11, 2004	4-06-360757-7
3	July 9, 2004	4-06-360758-5
4	August 10, 2004	4-06-360759-3

=== Anime ===
The manga was first adapted into a four-episode original video animation (OVA) series, directed by Kazuhiro Furuhashi, which was released in Japan from 1994 to 1995. An animated television series subsequently aired in Japan on TBS between 1996 and 1997, spanning a total of 47 episodes. 20 7-minute mini-specials and one full-length episode was created and broadcast on TBS in 1999. A 26-episode sequel to the series also aired on TBS in 2001. A third animated television series, You're Under Arrest: Full Throttle (逮捕しちゃうぞ フルスロットル, Taiho Shichauzo: Furu Surottoru), aired from 2007 to 2008. Animated by Studio Deen and produced by Bandai Visual, the series featured character designs by Atsuko Nakajima and music by Kow Otani and Yasunori Iwasaki. The first two television series were aired with English subtitles on AXN Asia's networks in Southeast Asia and South Asia.

AnimEigo licensed the initial OVA series, the first television series, and the only full-length television episode of You're Under Arrest that aired in 1999 for North American release. ADV Films subsequently released the 1999 mini-TV episodes that comprised the rest of You're Under Arrest! Mini-Specials as well as the movie. The 2001 TV series, the 2002 OVA TV special and Full Throttle are licensed in North America by Sentai Filmworks and distributed by Section23 Films.

==== Film ====
A 90-minute anime film, You're Under Arrest: The Movie, was released on April 24, 1999.

=== Video game ===
Released on March 29, 2001, by Pioneer LDC for the PlayStation, the You're Under Arrest game is a visual novel that introduces three new characters. One of them is a detective named Ryosuke Arisugawa, a 24-year-old plainclothed officer assigned to Bokuto Police Station in order to identify and arrest a hacker who was trying to break into the precinct's network system. Another character is his 18-year-old sister Chiharu Arisugawa, who the player must keep an eye on.

=== Novel ===
A novel was published by Kodansha. It is a stand-alone story from the series, detailing a fight with Miyuki and Natsumi due to the latter being late for work again in Bokuto Station. Work on the novel had been supervised by Kōsuke Fujishima himself personally with Atsuko Nakajima doing the artwork in the novel.

=== TV drama ===
A TV drama was created and aired on TV Asahi in 2002. The opening theme song was called "Galaxy" by Nana Katase, and the closing theme was "Through the Rain" by Mariah Carey.

== Reception ==
Shortly after You're Under Arrest 2 came out, You're Under Arrest was among the top 10 anime shows in Newtype's August 2001 issue.

Regarding the Full Throttle revival series, Theron Martin commented that "Little that the series does in these episodes is especially fresh or memorable, but if you were always a fan of the Bokuto Traffic Section's antics in the earlier series then that enjoyment is unlikely to fade here.". Similarly, Chris Beveridge said that "Though this season pales for a lot of people because some of the supporting cast are either minimized or gone entirely, I appreciated the return to dealing with the core cast of characters after all this time.".
