= Legend of the Gold of Babylon =

1985 Japanese animated film

Lupin III: The Legend of the Gold of Babylon
- DVD cover
- Kanji: ルパン三世 バビロンの黄金伝説
- Romanization: Rupan Sansei Babiron no Ōgon Densetsu
- Directed by: Seijun Suzuki; Shigetsugu Yoshida
- Screenplay by: Yoshio Urasawa; Atsushi Yamatoya
- Based on: Lupin III by Monkey Punch
- Produced by: Tetsuo Katayama; Kazushichi Sano; Hidehiko Takei
- Starring: Yasuo Yamada; Eiko Masuyama; Kiyoshi Kobayashi; Makio Inoue; Gorō Naya
- Cinematography: Hajime Hasegawa
- Edited by: Masatoshi Tsurubuchi
- Music by: Yuji Ohno
- Production company: Tokyo Movie Shinsha
- Distributed by: Toho
- Release date: July 13, 1985
- Running time: 100 minutes
- Country: Japan
- Language: Japanese

Lupin III: The Legend of the Gold of Babylon (Japanese: ルパン三世 バビロンの黄金伝説, Hepburn: Rupan Sansei Babiron no Ōgon Densetsu) is a 1985 Japanese animated heist comedy film directed by Seijun Suzuki and Shigetsugu Yoshida from a screenplay by Yoshio Urasawa and Atsushi Yamatoya. It is the third animated feature film based on the 1967–69 manga series Lupin III by Monkey Punch.

It was released on subtitled VHS and LaserDisc in North America by AnimEigo in 1994 under the "Rupan III" name, due to copyright concerns with Maurice Leblanc's Arsène Lupin. In 2018, Discotek Media released it on DVD and Blu-ray under its original name with an English dub.

== Synopsis ==
Lupin III and his gang are in New York City, planning to locate the secrets behind the hidden treasure of the ancient city of Babylon. He's currently being hunted by both Inspector Zenigata, and a group of hitmen working for mafioso Marciano, who's hunting the treasure himself and wants Lupin out of the picture. He also has several encounters with a mysterious old drunken woman by the name of Rosetta, who constantly expresses her love for him, while also surprisingly revealing to know of his quest and provides him helpful information.

Fujiko Mine, meanwhile, has gotten herself close to Marciano in hopes of using him to get ahold of the treasure for herself. He shows her his vast collection, including a set of stone tablets containing information to locate the treasure, however Fujiko turns out to be Lupin in disguise, who snatches pictures of the tablets before escaping. At the same time, Zenigata is dismissed from the Lupin case and forced into taking part in judging the "Miss ICPO Beauty Contest". After the pageant, he's re-instated but is coerced into dragging the nominees around with him, all who are eager to prove themselves as agents.

Lupin investigates using the information he's collected, with Jigen and Goemon skeptical based on the legends relating to the Tower of Babel and its connection to "Gods". Rosetta visits Lupin again, revealing that she was supposedly close to Napoleon when he tried searching for the treasure, causing him to get more suspicious about who she really is. Jigen and Goemon eventually agree to accompany him on the quest. The three board a train towards their destination, while being unknowingly followed by both Zenigata's crew and the hitmen. The ICPO girls attempt to get close to and arrest Lupin, but are hindered by the attacking hitmen who shoot up the train. During the escapade, Lupin's crew manage to allude both parties, all the while Rosetta slowly follows them on foot.

Arriving in Baghdad, the crew, plus Fujiko, make it to the excavation site run by Marciano, and using their information, Lupin sneaks his way into the ruins overnight. After passing the boobytraps, he comes across a visage of a young Rosetta, claiming that she was sent to Earth by her "God" that appears every 76 years, which Lupin deduces is Hailey's Comet. He discovers what appears to be the ancient treasure of Babylon, a golden lion, and manages to escape the crumbling ruins with it. Marciano and the hitmen attempt to claim the treasure for themselves, but Lupin flies away and escapes, only to be shot down by Fujiko who, accompanied by Rosetta, takes the lion for herself. Lupin, Jigen, and Goemon continue their escape from the hitmen, as well as the ICPO girls, who had commandeered tanks from the local army, but they manage to escape on the ocean. Lupin then reveals that the lion is not the real treasure of Babylon, and it's really back in New York. At this time, Marciano reclaims the lion and kidnaps Fujiko.

Back in New York, Marciano's second-in-command, Kowalski, kills one of the hitmen for their failure. Lupin, Jigen, and Goemon dig up gold bars buried underneath Madison Square, the true source of the gold of Babylon. Lupin reveals 2500 years ago, the Tower of Babel had been somehow transported from Babylon to New York, which he theorizes is the work of either aliens or a "God". After excavating several of the bars, the gang are once again attacked by the hitmen, while another reappearance by Rosetta reveals Fujiko's kidnapping. Lupin breaks into Marciano's building to rescue her, when Kowalski suddenly betrays Marciano, killing him, planning to take over control of the mob before tossing Lupin and Fujiko down the tower.

As they attempt to stop their descent, Lupin reveals to Fujiko the secret behind the treasure of Babylon, that "God" had collected all the gold he could and planned to take it back with him, but dropped it, with it landing somewhere in New York. They escape, while Kowalski is killed by a bomb in Lupin's packet of cigars, which he believed was a feint by Lupin from earlier. The following night, Rosetta uses her candelabra to send a signal to Hailey's Comet from atop Madison Square, as a UFO emerges from it, and the giant golden Tower of Babel is unearthed from below. Fujiko laments on the gold returning to the sky and that it belongs to the Earth (to her), spurring Lupin and the gang to grab onto it as it ascends.

At the top, Rosetta reverts to her younger self, who confirms that she's an alien/Goddess and that every 76 years she awakened looking for the gold of Babylon, in hopes of being reunited with her God. She thanks Lupin for finally tracking down the tower, something nobody else has been able to do before, saying her goodbyes and once again saying she loves him, before leaving into the UFO. Lupin uses Zantetsukan to destroy the candelabra, breaking the connection between the UFO and Tower, resulting in the Tower being completely destroyed, as gold chunks rain down on the city, and the UFO leaves the atmosphere. The gang parachute down, with Zenigata making one last failed attempt to nab Lupin, as he and Fujiko share a kiss.

== Cast ==
Character name	Voice actor	
Character name	Japanese	English
Character name	Japanese	Epcar Entertainment/Discotek Media (2018)
Lupin III	Yasuo Yamada	Tony Oliver
Fujiko Mine	Eiko Masuyama	Michelle Ruff
Daisuke Jigen	Kiyoshi Kobayashi	Richard Epcar
Goemon Ishikawa XIII	Makio Inoue	Lex Lang
Inspector Zenigata	Gorō Naya	Doug Erholtz
Rosetta	Toki Shiozawa; Naoko Kawai (young)	Ellyn Stern; Lauren Landa (young)
Marciano	Maki Carrousel	Chris Smith
Kowalski	Chikao Ōtsuka	Taylor Henry
Willy	Obon (Hirokazu Inoue)	Keith Silverstein
Chin	Kobon (Ryoichi Babazoe)	Todd Haberkorn
Caramel	Fumi Hirano	Lauren Landa
Chinjao	Keiko Han	Cindy Robinson
Zakskaya	Rihoko Yoshida	Cindy Robinson
Saranda	Keiko Toda	Cindy Robinson
Lasagna	Saeko Shimazu	Michelle Ruff
Sam	Kenichi Ogata	Lex Lang
ICPO Commissioner	Teiji Ōmiya	Taylor Henry
Tartini	Yūji Fujishiro	Todd Haberkorn

== Production ==
Until the release of the 2023 original net animation Lupin the 3rd vs. Cat's Eye, this film was the only Lupin film where he wears the pink jacket from the third TV series. AnimEigo released the film with English subtitles and Japanese dialogue under the title "Rupan III: Legend of the Gold of Babylon" on VHS and LaserDisc in the North America in 1995. In 2005, Discotek Media acquired it for a DVD release, however, it was later cancelled due to North America's declining anime industry. In August 2017, Discotek announced that they would release The Legend of the Gold of Babylon on DVD and Blu-ray. It has a new English dub featuring the same cast from Pioneer Entertainment's dub of the second Lupin anime. It was later announced that a Blu-ray would be released on November 27, 2018, while the DVD version was released on December 18, 2018.

== Reception ==
Mike Toole of Anime News Network stated that when he first watched The Legend of the Gold of Babylon in the 1990s, he hated it, having only known Lupin as the "smooth, gallant antihero" from The Castle of Cagliostro and The Plot of the Fuma Clan. Whereas Legend of the Gold of Babylon's version of Lupin is closer to Monkey Punch's original "rough, drunken, lecherous crook." However, a decade later, he stated that the film "goes down much smoother" having been acquainted with Suzuki's other work, the director being known for his bizarre and oddly-structured films.

Paul Jensen, also of Anime News Network, felt that the film's troubled production shows in the final product. He believes that its convoluted plot is a result of all the staff changes, with the drama, comedy and action scenes competing for the audiences' attention rather than complementing each other. Jensen stated that the movie feels more like a "few unrelated stories edited together than a single, unified film."
