= Lupin the 3rd: Prison of the Past =

Japanese anime television film

- Promotional poster

ルパン三世 プリズン・オブ・ザ・パスト (Rupan Sansei Prizun obu za Pasuto)
- Created by: Monkey Punch
- Anime television film
- Directed by: Hatsuki Tsuji
- Written by: Shatona Nishida
- Music by: Yuji Ohno
- Studio: TMS Entertainment
- Licensed by: NA: Discotek Media
- Original network: NNS (Nippon TV)
- Released: November 29, 2019
- Runtime: 91 minutes

Lupin the 3rd: Prison of the Past (ルパン三世 プリズン・オブ・ザ・パスト, Rupan Sansei Prizun obu za Pasuto) is a 2019 Japanese anime television special directed by Hatsuki Tsuji from a screenplay by Shatona Nishida serving as the 27th television special in the Lupin the 3rd series, itself based on the manga series of the same name by Monkey Punch. Produced by TMS Entertainment, the special debuted on Nippon Television on November 29, 2019, as part of the channel's Kinyo Roadshow.

This was the first Lupin the 3rd anime adaptation to be released during the Reiwa period and was also the first to be released after original creator Monkey Punch's death in April of that year.

== Plot ==
A world famous "Robin Hood" criminal known as Corbett Finnegan is sentenced to death after spending several years locked up in a high security prison in the Kingdom of Dorrente. Lupin and the gang plan to infiltrate the prison and break him out in hopes of claiming his vast treasure. Each member of the crew has a specific reason for wanting to help Finnegan; Jigen has history with him and feels indebted, Goemon desires to see a "modern day Robin Hood", and Lupin wants to prove himself the superior criminal. Fujiko, meanwhile, has manipulated many skillful thieves from around the world to bust into the prison, in hopes of taking the treasure for herself from one of them.

The thieves each try to get to him first, but are each unable to break through the prison's defences. Inspector Zenigata and his partner Yatagarasu arrive to assist the warden, Lorensa, having deduced Lupin would be involved, however a disguised Lupin is able to manipulate the guards into thinking they are Lupin in disguise and have them arrested.

Eventually, Lupin, Jigen, and Goemon are able to reach Finnegan first and prepare to bust him out. However, they are unexpectedly betrayed the man, with Jigen being captured, while Lupin and Goemon escape. Lupin lands in the depths of the prison, while Goemon is saved by a swordsman named Verte, who asks him for advice on how to be a more proficient and confident fighter.

Lupin re-enters the prison and reunites with Fujiko, who had herself infiltrated. They soon learn that Finnegan is in cahoots with the prison staff, that it is being used as a front for weapons and black market dealings, selling off valuable prisoners, with Finnegan providing extra funding with his treasure. Lupin further discovers that the King of Dorrente is under lockdown in the prison.

During the commotion, Zenigata and Yata had managed to break out of their containment, and stumble upon the black market dealings, including witnessing Jigen and the many thieves preparing to be sold off. Lupin and Zenigata agree to work together, and create a disruption during the deal. Lupin's crew reunite, and alongside Zenigata and Yata, fight their way through the armed men to confront Finnegan and Lorensa.

Figuring she's an unwilling participant, Lupin tries to convince Lorensa to trust them, but she's forced by Finnegan to activate a device that completely seals the prison in, forcing everyone to flee or risk being crushed. The gang with Lorensa manage to rescue the King, and barely survive the crush-in. As they escape, Lorensa reveals that the Prince, who is actually Verte, is alive. Overhearing this, Finnegan heads to deal with him.

The gang chase Finnegan in slow boats to an island, where the criminal battles Verte. It's revealed that he had undergone plastic surgery to look like the Prince so he can take over the Kingdom. After their showdown, Verte saves Lorensa and neutralizes Finnegan, stating his desire to become the next King. Verte and Lorensa thank the thieves for their help as they depart. Sometime later, Lupin, Jigen, and Goemon claim some of the seemingly lost treasure, while Fujiko and the other thieves take the rest for themselves.

== Voice cast ==
Character	Japanese voice actor	English voice actor
Lupin the 3rd	Kanichi Kurita	Tony Oliver
Daisuke Jigen	Kiyoshi Kobayashi	Richard Epcar
Goemon Ishikawa	Daisuke Namikawa	Lex Lang
Fujiko Mine	Miyuki Sawashiro	Michelle Ruff
Inspector Zenigata	Koichi Yamadera	Doug Erholtz
Lorensa	Houko Kuwashima	AmaLee
Finnegan	Hiroaki Hirata	Jalen K. Cassell
Goro Yatagarasu	Nobunaga Shimazaki	Kaiji Tang
Verte	Shinichiro Miki	Chris Hackney

== Production and release ==
The special was announced on October 18, 2019. Hatsuki Tsuji was involved in the franchise since the 1977 television series as an animator before becoming animator director for later installments in the series. Shatona Nishida previously wrote episode 20 of Part 5. Comedian duo Asagaya Sisters was confirmed to have a guest appearance on the special on November 25th of that year.

TMS Entertainment USA announced that it would host the special's North American premiere during the 2021 Anime NYC convention on November 20.

=== Home media release ===
The special was released on Blu-ray and DVD in Japan on February 19, 2020, by VAP. Discotek Media announced that it has licensed the special for a video release in North America on March 14, 2022. The special was released on Blu-ray and DVD in North America on July 26th of that year.

== Reception ==
When the special aired on Nippon TV, the special received a 10.1% viewership reception in the Kanto region.
