= Lupin the Third =

Japanese media franchise created by Monkey Punch

Lupin III
- The logo of the franchise
- Created by: Monkey Punch
- Original work: Lupin III (1967–1969)
- Owner: Monkey Punch
- Years: 1967–present

Print publications
- Comics: List of manga

Films and television
- Film(s): List of films
- Short film(s): Pilot Film (1969)
- Web series: Lupin Zero (2022)
- Animated series: List of animated series
- Television special(s): List of television specials
- Direct-to-video: The Fuma Conspiracy (1987); Return of Pycal (2002); Green vs. Red (2008); Lupin the 3rd vs. Cat's Eye (2023)

Theatrical presentations
- Musical(s): List of stage musicals

Games
- Video game(s): List of video games

Audio
- Soundtrack(s): List of soundtracks

Lupin III (Japanese: ルパン三世, Hepburn: Rupan Sansei), also written as Lupin the Third, Lupin the 3rd, or Lupin the IIIrd, is a Japanese media franchise created by Monkey Punch. The series follows the endeavors of master thief Lupin III, grandson of gentleman thief Arsène Lupin, joined by his criminal gang. The original Lupin III manga debuted in Weekly Manga Action on August 10, 1967.

Over fifty years after its creation, Lupin III remains popular, with a seventh anime series airing in 2021 and new original net animations (ONAs) released in 2023. Critical reception of the franchise has been largely positive across its various incarnations, with the appeal of the lead characters being noted as the primary factor of the series' success. The voice acting (in both Japanese and English versions) and soundtracks (especially those composed by Yuji Ohno) of the anime adaptations have also received similar acclaim; however, several of the franchise's installments, primarily the television specials, have been criticized for being formulaic. The manga has also been noted by critics and fans for its darker tone compared to anime adaptations, with its explicit depictions of sex and violence, as well as its dark, self-aware, fourth wall-breaking humor, contrasting with the somewhat family-friendly animated versions. For several years, issues relating to the copyright of Maurice Leblanc's intellectual property meant that the Lupin name was removed from its releases outside Japan, usually changed to "Rupan" or "Wolf". However, the copyright has since expired, allowing foreign releases to use the Lupin name.

Many different companies have owned the English-language distribution rights to various Lupin III properties at various times. Tokyopop acquired the license for the original manga in 2002, and later the second series in 2004. Seven Seas Entertainment licensed manga collections in 2020. The first English-language versions of the anime were licensed by Streamline Pictures, which dubbed and released two of the films and episodes of the second television series from 1991 to 1995. Funimation Entertainment dubbed and released several of the television specials and films from 2002 to 2006, and the fourth television series in 2013. Between 2003 and 2007, Geneon licensed and dubbed the first 79 episodes of the second television series, 26 of which were broadcast in the United States on Adult Swim in 2003 and 52 in Canada on G4techTV in 2007. Discotek Media licensed the first six television series in the franchise and the first live-action film; they also own the rights to numerous other Lupin titles, including several previously released by other companies.

== Premise ==
Lupin III, the grandson of the fictional gentleman thief, Arsène Lupin, is considered the world's greatest thief, known for announcing his intentions to steal valuable objects by sending a calling card to their owners. His right-hand man and best friend is Daisuke Jigen, an expert marksman who can accurately shoot a target in 0.3 seconds. Although Lupin and Jigen frequently work as a two-man team, they are often joined by Fujiko Mine, a femme fatale and Lupin's love interest, and Goemon Ishikawa XIII, a master swordsman whose sword can cut anything. Although Fujiko usually works together with the others, she occasionally exploits Lupin's interest in her to steal the treasure for herself. Lupin and his gang are constantly chased by Interpol Inspector Zenigata, who has made it his life's work to arrest the group, pursuing Lupin across the globe.

== Publication history ==
The main cast of Lupin the Third, as drawn by Monkey Punch. Clockwise from upper right: Lupin, Jigen, Zenigata, Goemon, and Fujiko.

The series was created in 1965 by Japanese manga artist Kazuhiko Katō under the pen name Monkey Punch. His inspiration for the series was the fictional gentleman thief Arsène Lupin, created by French writer Maurice Leblanc. Before creating the series, he read 15 of Leblanc's stories. The aim of the Lupin III series was to produce a comedy adventure series that reflected the traits of Leblanc's character. Originally, the intention was to keep the blood ties between the two fictional characters secret; however, he was convinced by others not to do so.

Monkey Punch combined elements of Arsène Lupin with James Bond to develop the character of Lupin III and made him a "carefree fellow". Lupin was given a red jacket, which Monkey Punch believed was a flashy, sexually attractive color.

As the series was to be published in a magazine targeted at adults, Fujiko Mine was created to add a female presence and to fulfill a "Bond girl" role. Her name was inspired by a picture of Mount Fuji, with Monkey Punch adding the -ko female suffix to create her first name, and he chose "Mine" for her family name because of its meaning "summit". At the beginning of the series, many of the women Lupin encounters are all named Fujiko, but are treated as different characters from chapter to chapter. Creating a new female character each week was too difficult for Monkey Punch, so she evolved into a single character who changed style frequently.

Jigen was based on American actor James Coburn, especially his role in The Magnificent Seven, and his name was chosen to reflect his unconventional personality.

Goemon was created to add a Japanese element in an otherwise Western-influenced series. Despite Lupin and Goemon originally being enemies, Monkey Punch decided that they were on the same wavelength and they eventually became allies.

While Lupin, Fujiko, Jigen and Goemon frequently worked together for their own goals, the author considered them not to be a true group as they had their own individual interests. In the manga they operated individually, but in the anime adaptations the group work together more often.

Inspector Zenigata was conceived as Lupin's arch-rival to create a "human Tom and Jerry" dynamic.

When Monkey Punch began Lupin III, he was already working on another series, Pinky Punky. Monkey Punch enjoyed writing outlaw characters, and both Lupin III and Pinky Punky made use of outlaws as central characters. According to him, this made it easy for him to write two series without much pressure. Monkey Punch enjoyed puzzles and mysteries works such as the television series Columbo and Agatha Christie novels, and was also inspired by The Three Musketeers and the films of Alfred Hitchcock. He believed the characters of Lupin and Fujiko were similar to the characters of D'Artagnan and Milady de Winter, and described them as "Not necessarily lovers, not necessarily husband and wife, but more just having fun as man and woman with each other." Another influence on the manga was Mad magazine. Monkey Punch said the appeal of drawing Lupin came from the character being able to go anywhere without obstacles and being able to do whatever he wants, whenever he wants. However, this was contrasted with Zenigata's strict personality. Originally the series was only expected to last three months, but due to its popularity, Monkey Punch continued to write it. However, despite his happiness at its success, he expressed confusion over its popularity.

Monkey Punch said that he believed the story could never end but that if it had to, both Zenigata and Lupin would have to end as equals. They would either both fail, both win, or both get very old.

== Copyright issues ==
Monkey Punch did not ask permission to use the Arsène Lupin name, and at the time, Japan did not enforce trade copyrights. By the time Leblanc's estate launched legal action in Japan, the name was considered to have entered into common usage. However, this was not the case in North America and Europe and several foreign releases dropped the Lupin III title. The character himself was also renamed "Wolf" in the Streamline Pictures and Manga Entertainment English dubs and "Rupan" in the AnimEigo English dub. In France, the series was known as Edgar, Detective Cambrioleur (Edgar, Detective Burglar) with Lupin himself renamed "Edgar de la Cambriole" (Edgar of Burglary). Monkey Punch stated that using the same character design, behavior, and face would be illegal, but using a name alone is not illegal. In 2012, Leblanc's original Arsène Lupin entered the public domain in France due to 70 years passing since his death in 1941, and is in the public domain for any country that enforces the rule of the shorter term.

== Media ==
=== Manga ===
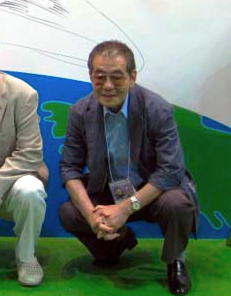
Lupin III was created by Monkey Punch.

Lupin III was written and illustrated by Monkey Punch. It was serialized by Futabasha in Weekly Manga Action, from August 10, 1967, to May 22, 1969, comprising 94 chapters. The series was then collected in 14 tankōbon volumes. Additional chapters known as Lupin III New Adventures were released from August 12, 1971. Tokyopop licensed the series in for publication in North America, and released all 14 volumes between December 10, 2002, and July 6, 2004. The Tokyopop edition is adapted from the Chuokoron Shinsha edition from 1989. While it hasn't been rescued since then, two anthology Lupin III manga published in Japan after Monkey Punch's death were published in English by Seven Seas Entertainment.

Monkey Punch began publishing the second Lupin manga, Shin Lupin III, in Weekly Manga Action on June 23, 1977, until 1981. Three chapters were published in the British magazine Manga Mania between May and July 1996. Tokyopop licensed the second series, and released the first nine volumes as Lupin III: World's Most Wanted between September 7, 2004, and July 10, 2007. Tokyopop later cancelled the series due to low sales. Like the first series, the Tokyopop release was based on the Chuokoron Shinsha edition from 1990.

Since 1997, a number of manga series have been created by several artists and released in several Futabasha magazines. On August 27, 2004, Futabasha launched Lupin III Official Magazine, a quarterly publication of Lupin III manga by various authors.

Yutaka Abe and Jirō Maruden produced a three chapter adaptation of the Lupin III vs. Detective Conan TV special. From August 25, they also created a manga adaptation of Lupin III vs. Detective Conan: The Movie for Shogakukans Shonen Super Sunday magazine.

An isekai spin-off manga, Lupin the Third: Neighbor World Princess, written by Yōsuke Saeki and illustrated by Keyaki Uchi-Uchi, began serialization in Akita Shoten's Weekly Shōnen Champion on August 26, 2021.

=== Anime series ===
==== Part I ====
On October 24, 1971, YTV began airing the first Lupin III television series. The series was broadcast for 23 episodes, with the last one airing on March 26, 1972. The series was initially directed by Masaaki Ōsumi, who was then replaced by Hayao Miyazaki and Isao Takahata. Discotek Media licensed and released the first series on DVD in North America on June 26, 2012.

==== Part II ====
The second Lupin III television series began airing on NTV on October 3, 1977. This series was broadcast for 155 episodes, with the last one airing on October 6, 1980. Episodes 145 and 155 received American distribution and an English dub from Streamline Pictures, which released the episodes to VHS individually in 1994 as Lupin III: Tales of the Wolf and together as Lupin III's Greatest Capers in 1995. Pioneer Entertainment began distributing the first 79 episodes of the series in North America with an English dub on January 28, 2003. The first 79 episodes were released on 15 DVDs and 26 episodes (the first 27, excluding the third episode) aired on Cartoon Network's Adult Swim block. Voice director Richard Epcar stated in 2014 that the remainder of the series was not distributed by Pioneer because they had lost the license. In 2015, Discotek Media announced they had licensed the series for North America and released all 155 episodes across four DVDs from 2017 to 2020. The Discotek release utilized the existing Pioneer dub for the first 79 episodes and the Streamline dub for episodes 145 and 155; a new English dub was not created for the remaining episodes.

==== Lupin VIII ====
In 1982, an animated television series called Lupin VIII was planned as a French-Japanese co-production, featuring the descendants of Lupin, Goemon, Jigen, and Zenigata, but was never completed. Created by DiC Audiovisuel, with Rintaro directing, and character designs by Shingo Araki, two scripts were written, and one episode was fully animated with a music and sound effects track, but the voice-overs were never recorded. The project was cancelled due to Leblanc's estate wanting a large amount of money for use of the Arsène Lupin name in France. Lupin VIII's single episode was later included in the 2012 Lupin III Master File box set.

==== Part III ====
The third Lupin III television series, called Lupin the 3rd Part III, began airing on YTV on March 3, 1984. This series was broadcast for 50 episodes and ended on November 6, 1985. In 2009, the Southern California-based United Television Broadcasting network began airing subtitled episodes from all three series on their UTB Hollywood channel.

==== The Woman Called Fujiko Mine ====
The fourth series, titled Lupin the Third: The Woman Called Fujiko Mine, aired on NTV for 13 episodes from April 4, 2012, and June 27, 2012. Funimation Entertainment simulcast the series on their website and Nico Nico with English subtitles, before releasing it on DVD and Blu-ray on August 20, 2013, with an English-language dub. Manga Entertainment released a similar set in the United Kingdom on September 16, while Hanabee released the series in a two-part combo set in Australasia, the first on October 16 and the second on November 20.

==== Part IV: The Italian Adventure ====
The fifth series, Lupin the 3rd Part IV: The Italian Adventure, was produced by Telecom Animation Film and is set in Italy and San Marino. It aired in Italy for 26 episodes on the Italia 1 channel between August 30, 2015, and November 30, 2015, while in Japan it aired for 24 episodes on NTV between October 1, 2015, and March 17, 2016. The series has been licensed by Anime Limited for the UK market and by Discotek for the US. It aired in the US on the Toonami block of Adult Swim starting in June 2017.

==== Part 5 ====
The sixth anime television series, Lupin the 3rd Part 5, aired in 2018. It is set in France, the home of the titular character's grandfather and namesake, and aired on NTV from April 4 to September 18, 2018. Like Part 4, the English dub was aired by Toonami. This included 24 episodes and an OVA.

==== Part 6 ====
The seventh series, Lupin the 3rd Part 6, premiered on October 10, 2021, coinciding with the 50th anniversary celebration of the first anime.

=== Films ===
==== Live action ====
The first Lupin III theatrical feature, Lupin III: Strange Psychokinetic Strategy (ルパン三世 念力珍作戦), was a live-action film and released on August 3, 1974. It included all of the main cast members with the exception of Goemon Ishikawa XIII. In contrast to the dark themes of the first animated television series, the live-action film was very heavy on slapstick humor and physics-defying stunts. The film was released on DVD in North America in 2006 by Discotek Media.

A second live-action film, titled simply Lupin III and directed by Ryuhei Kitamura, was released on August 30, 2014. The cast features Shun Oguri as Lupin, Meisa Kuroki as Fujiko, Tetsuji Tamayama as Jigen, Gō Ayano as Goemon, and Tadanobu Asano as Zenigata. Tomoyasu Hotei composed the theme song for the film. A sequel was announced to be in development.

A third live-action film, Daisuke Jigen (『次元大介』, Jigen Daisuke), was released internationally on Amazon Prime Video on October 13, 2023. The movie focuses on the character Jigen, portrayed by Tamayama, who reprises the role from the 2014 live-action adaptation. The film was produced by TMS Entertainment in co-production with Amazon MGM Studios.

Film	Release date	Director	Screenwriter(s)	Producer(s)
Feature-length live action films
Lupin III: Strange Psychokinetic Strategy	August 3, 1974	Takashi Tsuboshima	Hiroshi Nagano	Yutaka Fujioka and Kameo Ōki
Lupin III	August 30, 2014	Ryuhei Kitamura	Mataichirō Yamamoto	Mataichirō Yamamoto
Daisuke Jigen	October 13, 2023	Hajime Hashimoto	Yoshimasa Akamatsu	Kenichi Nakayama

==== Animated ====
Adapting the manga into an animated film was first suggested by animator Gisaburō Sugii to Yutaka Fujioka, the founder of TMS Entertainment. This led to the creation of Lupin the Third: Pilot Film, consisting of introductions to the manga series' five lead characters, intended to generate interest in the project and secure funding. The Pilot Film was created by Sugii, Yasuo Otsuka, Tsutomu Shibayama and Osamu Kobayashi, with supervision by Masaaki Ōsumi. Completed in 1969, the project was left unsold and the Pilot Film was adapted for television when Yomiuri Television agreed to broadcast and provide funding for a televised animated adaptation of the manga in 1971.

Since then, several animated films based on Lupin III have been created by TMS Entertainment. In 2023, the Lupin III franchise had a crossover with City Hunter in the animated film City Hunter: Angel Dust. Kanichi Kurita and Akio Ōtsuka reprised their roles as Lupin III and Daisuke Jigen.

In 2025, director Takeshi Koike returned to the franchise with the first traditionally-animated feature-length solo Lupin the 3rd film in nearly 30 years, Lupin the IIIrd the Movie: The Immortal Bloodline.

Film	Release date	Director	Screenwriter(s)	Producer(s)
Feature-length animated films
Lupin III: The Mystery of Mamo	December 16, 1978	Sōji Yoshikawa	Atsushi Yamatoya and Sōji Yoshikawa	Yutaka Fujioka
Lupin III: The Castle of Cagliostro	December 15, 1979	Hayao Miyazaki	Hayao Miyazaki and Haruya Yamazaki	Tetsuo Katayama
Lupin III: The Legend of the Gold of Babylon	July 13, 1985	Seijun Suzuki and Shigetsugu Yoshida	Yoshio Urasawa and Atsushi Yamatoya	Tetsuo Katayama, Kazushichi Sano and Hidehiko Takei
Lupin III: The Fuma Conspiracy	December 26, 1987	Masayuki Ōzeki	Makoto Naitô	Koji Takeuchi
Lupin III: Farewell to Nostradamus	April 22, 1995	Shunya Itō and Takeshi Shirato	Hiroshi Kashiwabara and Shunya Itō	Chuji Nakajima, Hibiki Ito, Koji Takeuchi, Masato Matsumoto and Toshio Nakatani
Lupin III: Dead or Alive	April 20, 1996	Monkey Punch	Hiroshi Sakakibara	Chuji Nakajima and Hidehiko Takei
Lupin III vs. Detective Conan: The Movie	December 7, 2013	Hajime Kamegaki	Atsushi Maekawa	Takuya Itō, Naoki Iwasa, Takeshi Yamakawa, and Yoshihito Yonekura
Lupin III: Jigen's Gravestone	June 21, 2014	Takeshi Koike	Yuuya Takahashi	Yu Kiyozono
Lupin III: Goemon's Blood Spray	February 4, 2017	Takeshi Koike	Yuuya Takahashi	Yu Kiyozono
Lupin III: Fujiko's Lie	May 31, 2019	Takeshi Koike	Yuuya Takahashi	Yu Kiyozono
Lupin III: The First	December 6, 2019	Takashi Yamazaki	Takashi Yamazaki	Takeshi Ito, Naoaki Kitajima and Koji Nozaki
Lupin III: The Immortal Bloodline	June 27, 2025	Takeshi Koike	Yūya Takahashi	

=== Original video animations ===
Several original video animations (OVAs) of Lupin III have been produced. Return of Pycal was released on April 3, 2002, as part of the 30th anniversary of the first television series and features the return of one of the original villains of the series, the magician Pycal. Green vs. Red was released on April 2, 2008, as part of the 40th anniversary of the manga series.

The Lupin III Master File box set released in 2012 included a new short animation titled Lupin Family Lineup (ルパン一家勢揃い, Rupan Ikka Seizoroi) where the veteran cast of Kanichi Kurita as Lupin, Kiyoshi Kobayashi as Jigen, Makio Inoue as Goemon, Eiko Masuyama as Fujiko, and Goro Naya as Zenigata reunited for the last time, after the latter three were replaced for the previous year's TV special. A parody flash anime titled Lupin Shanshei (ルパンしゃんしぇい, Rupan Shanshei) was produced by animator Frogman and his studio DLE Inc. in collaboration with TMS. The ten shorts were released on Blu-ray Disc and DVD on December 19, 2012.

A memorial episode titled Is Lupin Still Burning? (ルパンは今も燃えているか？, Lupin wa Ima mo Moeteiruka?) was created to celebrate the 50th anniversary of the manga. It was directed by Jun Kawagoe, with Monkey Punch as general director and character designs by Hisao Horikoshi and Satoshi Hirayama. Its title is a reference to the debut episode of the first anime and as such this episode follows its story, but also features other adversaries such as Kyosuke Mamo, Sandayu Momochi, Pycal, and Stoneman. It was included in the first DVD/Blu-ray set of the Part V anime, released on July 25, 2018. An English dub of the episode aired on Toonami on December 14, 2019.

=== Original net animations ===
On October 24, 2022, TMS Entertainment announced a six-episode original net animation (ONA) prequel series titled Lupin Zero. The series was animated by Telecom Animation Film and directed by Daisuke Sakō, with Ichirō Ōkouchi overseeing series scripts, Asami Taguchi designing the characters, and Yoshihide Otomo composing the music. The series is centered around Lupin III's adolescent days and features stories from the manga along with new ones. The series premiered on December 16, 2022. The opening theme is "Afro 'Lupin '68'", while the ending theme is "Lupin III Theme Song II" (ルパン三世主題歌II, Rupan Sansei Shudaika Tsū), performed by Tavito Nanao. Sentai Filmworks released the series on Blu-ray in North America on September 26, 2023.

On September 22, 2022, TMS Entertainment announced a CGI crossover anime with Cat's Eye, Lupin the 3rd vs. Cat's Eye. The anime was directed by Kōbun Shizuno and Hiroyuki Seshita, with Keisuke Ide serving as assistant director, Shūji Kuzuhara writing the scripts, Yuji Ohno and Kazuo Otani composing the music, and Haruhisa Nakata and Junko Yamanaka designing the characters. The anime premiered on Amazon Prime Video as a worldwide exclusive on January 27, 2023.

On May 1, 2025, an ONA by director Takeshi Koike, Lupin the IIIrd: Zenigata and the Two Lupins (LUPIN THE IIIRD 銭形と2人のルパン, Zenigata to Futari no Lupin), was announced as a prequel to his then-upcoming Lupin the IIIrd the Movie: The Immortal Bloodline; it was released on June 20.

=== Television specials ===
Between 1989 and 2013, a new animated television special by TMS Entertainment aired on NTV every year. The tradition started with Bye Bye, Lady Liberty on April 4, 1989. 2007's The Elusiveness of the Fog was broadcast on July 27 as part of the 40th anniversary celebration of the original manga, featuring the return of a villain from the original television series, Kyousuke Mamo. A crossover special titled Lupin the 3rd vs. Detective Conan, featuring characters from both Lupin III and Detective Conan, aired on March 27, 2009, attracting a record audience share of 19.5.

The 2011 special Blood Seal of the Eternal Mermaid introduced new voice actors for Fujiko, Zenigata and Goemon, the first change in 16 years. Princess of the Breeze, the last of the yearly consecutive specials, features Yui Ishikawa as its heroine Yutika.

On January 8, 2016, Italian Game, a special tie-in with the Part IV TV series aired. Two new television specials aired in 2019, Goodbye Partner and Prison of the Past.

=== Stage musicals ===
Multiple stage musical adaptations of the series have been produced. The first, I'm Lupin, was performed by Troupe Something at the Sunshine Theater from November 5 to November 8, 1998. The musical was intended to celebrate the 30th anniversary of the manga series, although the anniversary was actually the year before. The all-female acting troupe Takarazuka Revue began a stage musical adaptation of the manga series, titled Lupin III: Go After the Queen's Necklace!, at the Takarazuka Grand Theater from January 1 to February 2, 2015. It moved to the Tokyo Takarazuka Theater and featured from February 20 to March 22 of the same year. A kabuki play, Rupan Sansei (流白浪燦星), was performed at the Shinbashi Enbujō theater from December 5 to December 25, 2023.

=== Spin-off television series ===
A live action television series adaptation of the Inspector Zenigata spin-off manga aired in Japan in 2017. The project was a collaboration between NTV, Wowow and Hulu Japan and stars Ryohei Suzuki, Atsuko Maeda and Takahiro Miura.

=== Video games ===
The first Lupin video game, simply titled Lupin III, was a stealth game released on arcades in Japan by Taito in 1980. A Laserdisc video game entitled Cliff Hanger was released to arcades in North America in 1983 by Stern. While it used footage from The Mystery of Mamo and The Castle of Cagliostro to provide a gaming experience similar to Dragon's Lair, it changes the characters' names and has an original plot. Since then Lupin video games have been released for a number of platforms including Family Computer, Super Famicom, Sony PlayStation, Sony PlayStation 2, Sega Saturn, Nintendo DS and Sega Naomi.

A range of Pachinko and slot machines have been produced by Heiwa since 1998.

=== Soundtracks ===
Columbia Music Entertainment and VAP have both released numerous Lupin III music CDs in Japan. These include over 50 soundtrack albums by Takeo Yamashita and Yuji Ohno for the TV series, movies, and specials, as well as 15 collections of jazz arrangements by the Yuji Ohno trio, the Lupintic Five, and the Lupintic Sixteen.

Geneon Entertainment has released two of the music CDs in the United States. Lupin the 3rd: Sideburn Club Mix is a collection of thirteen remixed themes from the first television series, which was released in conjunction with the first DVD volume on January 28, 2003. Lupin the 3rd Original Soundtrack, released on April 8, 2003, is a collection of fifteen themes from the second television series performed by Yuji Ohno with his jazz group You & the Explosion Band.

To celebrate the 40th anniversary of the series, a live concert was held on September 8, 2007, performed by Yuji Ohno and the Lupintic Sixteen; a concert DVD was released in Japan on December 21, 2007. Play the Lupin clips x parts, a compilation of Lupin animation clips set to music from the series, as well as the opening and ending credits from a number of Lupin III productions, was released on DVD and Blu-ray Disc in Japan on May 22, 2009.

Music from the series has been covered by a range of artists, including Double, Ego-Wrappin' and The Ventures.

== Reception ==
The Lupin III franchise has enjoyed lasting popularity in Japan; the manga was 38th place on Japan's Agency for Cultural Affairs' 2007 list of the top 50 manga series. In 2000, satellite TV channel Animax, together with Brutus, a men's lifestyle magazine, and Tsutaya, Japan's largest video rental chain, conducted a poll among 200,000 fans on the top anime series, with Lupin III coming in second. TV Asahi conducted two polls in 2005 on the Top 100 Anime, with Lupin III coming in fifth in the nationwide survey conducted with multiple age-groups and twelfth in the online poll. The Castle of Cagliostro was fifth place on the Agency for Cultural Affairs' list of the best anime, while the original television series was 50th place on the same list. In 2001, the magazine Animage listed the original Lupin III TV series as the ninth best anime production of all time. In 2012, 38.7% of people polled by Tokyo Polytechnic University named Lupin III as part of Cool Japan.

In Manga: The Complete Guide, Jason Thompson described Monkey Punch's original manga as "a crazy, groovy 1960s world of dynamite and backstabbing, hippies and gangsters", and considered it "a fascinating homage to Mad magazine and a four star example of comics as pure comedy." He rated the series four out of four stars. Allen Divers of Anime News Network (ANN) praised the strong writing and action; however, he felt that the art was too primitive. Otaku USA's Daryl Surat was also put off by the art, saying he couldn't tell most characters apart and had a hard time figuring out what he was looking at. In The Rough Guide to Manga, Jason S. Yadao highlighted the example of how Lupin wearing a hat looks exactly like Zenigata. However, he considered it a successful plot device that may take several attempts to understand but eventually pays off. He included the series in his list of 50 essential manga. Many of the first volumes of the English edition of the Lupin III manga released by Tokyopop made it onto ICv2's list of the top 50 graphic novels, as well as later volumes from the series.

In Anime Classics Zettai!, Brian Clamp and Julie Davis compare the first two anime adaptions. They note that the first series is of a serious style, closer to the original manga with a dark tone and that it focuses on disputes between Lupin and other criminals. In contrast, they sum up the second series as a caper comedy with a more comedic tone and style. Both Chris Beveridge of Mania.com and Mike Crandol of ANN disliked the dub of the second television series because Pioneer Entertainment used many modern references and updated dialogue for a series that was released in the late 1970s, although the series itself received a positive overall review from both critics. Rob Lineberger of DVD Verdict wrote, "Lupin the Third is James Bond meets Charlie's Angels with Scooby-Doo sensibilities." Monkey Punch believed that the voice work of Yasuo Yamada was a major factor in the popularity of the anime series.

Chris Beveridge of Mania.com gave The Castle of Cagliostro film an "A+", although he disliked Manga Entertainment's use of PG-13 level language in the English dub. While the film was not initially a box-office success, it gained popularity through numerous re-releases and was even voted as "the best anime in history" by the readers of Animage. The film was the best-selling anime DVD in May 2001, and the third best selling in June. Some fans maintain that it is not a "true" Lupin title, due to Miyazaki's altering of the titular character into a family-friendly hero, rather than his original ruthless criminal self. While admitting that Cagliostro is the most well-known, ANN's Mike Crandol cited The Fuma Conspiracy as the best Lupin animation.

The Lupin III television specials released by Funimation have received reviews varying from positive to mixed. The most well-received is considered to be Island of Assassins, with Beveridge describing it as "the best non-TV Lupin experience ... since The Castle of Cagliostro". Missed by a Dollar received an eight out of ten rating from IGN's Jeremy Mullin, who stated it starts off as seemingly a simple heist film, but turns out to have plenty of twists. The least well-received of Funimation's releases is Secret of the Twilight Gemini, which received mixed reviews due to its poor animation and B movie-style plot. Mania.com gave 2002's Episode 0: First Contact an A+ and hailed it as the best TV special made to date. In 500 Essential Anime Movies, Helen McCarthy names Liberty her personal favourite of the Lupin TV specials. She describes it as "light, funny and entertaining" and "terrific entertainment".

Critical reception of the 2014 live-action film was generally negative among Japanese and Western film critics, especially following the film's showing at LA EigaFest. Areas frequently targeted for criticism were Ryuhei Kitamura's direction, the film's supporting characters, screenplay, cinematography and editing (especially in the action scenes), costume design and soundtrack. The film was also criticized for having most of its dialogue performed in English (resulting in poor delivery and intonation of numerous lines by its Asian cast members), and for overall squandering its potential as an adaptation of the source material. Shun Oguri, Tetsuji Tamayama, Gō Ayano, Meisa Kuroki and Tadanobu Asano were, however, frequently seen as well-cast in their respective roles. Audience opinions were mixed, with some viewing the film as "an enjoyable time to be had to the whole family", while others viewed it as part of a "terrible live-action adaptation trend that has been going on through the years".

Writing for The Fandom Post, Beveridge praised the Lupin Zero original net animation as a "thoroughly enjoyable experience" that had the hallmarks of the original manga with actual violence and blood and "lightly pervy" moments. Giving the series an "A" rating, he also praised the relationship between Lupin and Jigen. Gunawan of Anime News Network described the relationship between the two characters as reminiscent of classic buddy cop films, and also gave the six-episode series an "A" rating. They praised the "simple and engaging" story and action scenes, but noted some viewers might not enjoy the retro art style, although they personally did.

== Legacy ==
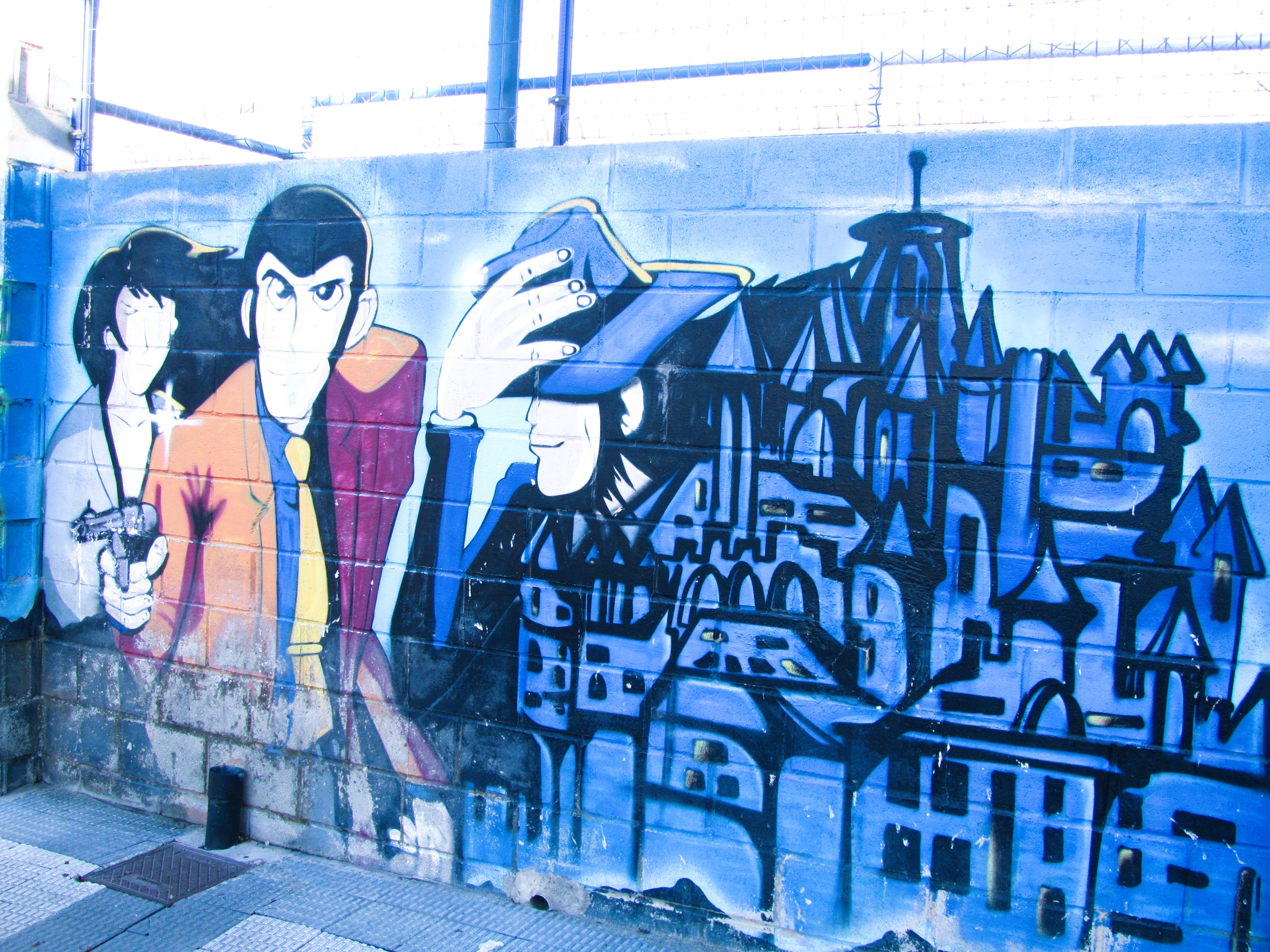
A Lupin III-themed mural featuring Goemon, Lupin, and Jigen in Zaragoza, Spain

Cowboy Bebop and Samurai Champloo director Shinichirō Watanabe revealed during an interview with Newtype Japan that he was heavily influenced by the work of director Masaaki Ōsumi on the first Lupin television series. Animator Akihiro Kanayam cited the animation of the anime adaption as an inspiration. Numerous anime series have made reference to the series, including Magical Princess Minky Momo, Cat's Eye, Gunbuster, Urusei Yatsura, Cowboy Bebop, Here is Greenwood and FLCL. Video game designer Hideo Kojima compared the personality of Lupin with Solid Snake in Metal Gear Solid, stating that in "MGS, Snake became this sharp-tongued, Lupin III-like guy who flirted with women and told lots of jokes". Kojima would also partially base his character EVA on Fujiko Mine.

On March 30, 1984, the series was the last animated work to be featured on the cover of the Japanese TV Guide magazine before the implementation of a policy limiting the cover to real life images. In the manga and anime Azumanga Daioh by Kiyohiko Azuma, Tomo Takino is a fan of the series and admires Fujiko Mine. She constantly makes references to herself as Fujiko, despite the fact the two are totally different in looks and personality. In 2006, Kanye West's "Touch the Sky" featured rapper Lupe Fiasco referencing Lupin III. In 2008, the Lupin III-themed attraction "Lupin III: Labyrinth Trap", which has visitors track down treasure in a maze-like layout, opened at the Tokyo Dome City Attractions amusement park.

In 2009, Japanese-Canadian rock band Monkey Majik created an animated music video in which its members meet the Lupin III gang. The video, which is set to the band's version of the anime's theme song, promoted the Lupin the Third Dance & Drive official covers & remixes CD. A campaign titled "Lupin Steal Japan" was launched that same year by NTV, TMS Entertainment, Namco Bandai Games, and Heiwa, the latter a manufacturer of pachinko machines. The project's website took suggestions on real-life objects for Lupin to steal. One such example is the Moyai statue in Shibuya, which was taken elsewhere for cleaning on December 7, but was replaced by the calling card of the master thief that read "Thanks for the Moyai".

In celebration of the anime's 40th anniversary, the "This is the World of Lupin III" event was held at the Matsuya store in Ginza. From August 10 to August 22, 2011, over 300 Lupin III-related were exhibited, including original manuscripts by Monkey Punch and animation cels from the feature films. The following year, a similar exhibit was held at the Kitakyushu museum from November 3 to December 28, and another at the Kawasaki City Museum from October to November 10, 2013. The exhibit then moved to Aomori's Sunroad shopping centre from December 21, 2013, to January 21, 2014.

In 2012, the Hokkaido Railway Company unveiled Lupin III–themed trains on the Hanasaki Line between Kushiro and Nemuro station, in honor of Monkey Punch, who is a native of Hokkaido. The train was originally scheduled to run until March 2015, but was then extended until March 2017. From April 1, 2014, to March 31, 2015, the city of Sakura in Chiba prefecture began accepting applications for Lupin III motorcycle and minicar license plates. Monkey Punch was a resident of the city (until his death in 2019) and the plates were commissioned for the 60th anniversary of being awarded city status. The plates were limited to 3,000 across four categories, with 2,500 plates reserved for 50 cc vehicles. In 2017, one of the fish in the American television series FishCenter Live was named Lupin the Third.
