= Lupin the 3rd vs. Detective Conan =

2009 film directed by Hajime Kamegaki

- Lupin III vs. Detective Conan
- North American DVD cover artwork

ルパン三世VS名探偵コナン (Rupan Sansei Vāsasu Meitantei Konan)
- Created by: Monkey Punch; Gosho Aoyama
- Anime television film
- Directed by: Hajime Kamegaki
- Produced by: Michihiko Suwa (YTV); Tetsu Kojima (TMS); Toshio Nakatani (NTV)
- Written by: Atsushi Maekawa
- Music by: Katsuo Ohno; Yuji Ohno
- Studio: TMS Entertainment
- Licensed by: NA: Discotek Media
- Original network: NNS (NTV, ytv)
- Released: March 27, 2009
- Runtime: 104 minutes

Lupin III vs. Detective Conan (Japanese: ルパン三世VS名探偵コナン, Hepburn: Rupan Sansei Vāsasu Meitantei Konan) is a Japanese animated crossover television special between the Lupin III and Detective Conan characters. It was broadcast on Nippon Television and Yomuri TV on March 27, 2009. Discotek Media released the television film on DVD in North America on October 27, 2015.

== Plot ==
Queen Sakura, sovereign of the European absolute kingdom of Vespania, in Turkey, is killed while out hunting. All indications suggest that she was accidentally shot by her son, Prince Gill, who immediately commits suicide, overcome by guilt. The title of heir to the throne of Vespania passes to Princess Mira, a girl who rejects the throne because she thinks that she's not the rightful heir. The coronation ceremony is threatened by a growing popular movement that believes Princess Mira is unfit to govern. Duke Keith, the chief of Commons, makes Daisuke Jigen, former trainer of Vespania's regular army, a personal guard of the princess. Simultaneously, Arsène Lupin III reaches Vespania; his and Jigen's plan is to get their hands on the crown for the Queens of the Realm. To increase the princess' popularity, a trip around Japan is organized. A festival is held at the Grand Hotel West City Tama, which Kogoro Mouri and Conan Edogawa attend. At the party, Conan exposes an attempt to poison the princess. The princess wants nothing more than to escape from her condition, so in the confusion that follows, she sneaks away. Conan notices this, and follows her.

The Princess meets Ran Mouri, who is returning from evening classes. She notes an uncanny resemblance in their appearance, and decides to trade places with her. Ran, dressed as the princess, goes back to the hotel and explains what happened. Duke Keith, to avoid a diplomatic incident with Japan, forces Ran to continue to play the role of Mira. Duke Keith breaks his promise to return Ran after a press conference at the airport, and brings her to Vespania. Conan, who noticed what Duke Keith was doing, boards the plane, and is saved from hypothermia by the Duke. Desperate to save his daughter, Kogoro is aided by Inspector Megure, who calls in a fellow police academy graduate, Koichi Zenigata. Since it has been learned that Lupin has traveled to Vespania, Megure arranges for Kogoro to officially accompany Zenigata as his assistant to apprehend the master thief.

In the meantime, Mira is collected by Fujiko Mine, who knows her identity and offers to take her around Japan. Conan tracks the princess and chases the pair on his skateboard, but Fujiko loses him and disappears. Meanwhile, hidden beneath the kingdom is a mineral that thanks to its "complete stealth powers" may be totally invisible to radar. Using dowsing rods, Lupin locates the mineral and appropriates a piece of it to help him facilitate his theft of the crown.

Princess Mira has since returned to Vespania. Fujiko was hired by Duke Keith to remove the princess from court life to make her feel, at least for a while, the typical teenage experience, which helped her overcome her earlier cynical, fatalistic attitude. Mira, after visiting the place where her brother and mother died, decides to assume her duties as future queen, and agrees to return to the palace. Lupin later enters the vault of the building, and finds out that the crown has already been stolen by Fujiko. He is forced to give up and flee the building with Goemon Ishikawa XIII's aid when it is surrounded by police after an alarm sounds.

After meeting with Ran and Kogoro, Conan begins to investigate the murder of the Queen with the involuntary help of Jigen. After Conan and Kogoro have concluded their investigation, Conan tries to put Kogoro to sleep with a tranquilizer needle, but fails to hit Kogoro (who is actually Lupin in disguise), and hits Zenigata instead, who wakes up again after only a few seconds. Lupin reveals his secret identity to Conan, and helps resolve the case by pretending to be the true Kogoro. Together they reveal the truth: The murder of the queen is the work of Duke Gerard Musca Vespaland, Queen Sakura's own brother and the Prime Minister of Vespania. Gerard had also killed the prince, making the case seem to be a murder-suicide. His plan was to ascend to the throne himself, and to get rich from selling the ore the Queen had forbidden to mine, due to its potential to be used in war and her love for nature, which would have been destroyed if excessive mining had taken place. Thanks to Conan and Lupin, Vespaland is apprehended, and Princess Mira becomes the new queen of Vespania, after Lupin returns the Queen's crown to her. Ran and Kogoro are welcomed as saviors of the kingdom, and Zenigata yearns for yet another fight with Lupin. Conan is taken in a car by members of the Japanese embassy, who are really Lupin and his gang, who have decided to help Conan return to Japan due to Conan's lack of a legal identification. Lupin explains that he returned to Vespania to honor a promise he made to Queen Sakura. He knows the true identity of the young detective, calling Conan Shinichi Kudo, while Conan promises them that if one day they cross paths again, he will definitely arrest them all. The film ends with Conan and Fujiko taking a ride on a borrowed submarine back to Japan, during which Fujiko begins to very closely "investigate" the effects the APTX-4869 had in transforming Shinichi Kudo into Conan Edogawa.

== Cast ==
- Conan Edogawa – Minami Takayama
- Arsène Lupin III – Kanichi Kurita
- Daisuke Jigen – Kiyoshi Kobayashi
- Goemon Ishikawa XIII – Makio Inoue
- Fujiko Mine – Eiko Masuyama
- Koichi Zenigata – Gorō Naya
- Ran Mouri – Wakana Yamazaki
- Kogoro Mouri – Akira Kamiya
- Juzo Megure – Chafurin
- Wataru Takagi – Wataru Takagi
- Sonoko Suzuki – Naoko Matsui
- Shinichi Kudo – Kappei Yamaguchi
- Mira Julietta Vespaland – Yui Horie
- Keith Dan Stinger – Hikaru Midorikawa
- Sakura Aludia Vespaland – Hiroko Suzuki
- Gill Cowell Vespaland – Jun Fukuyama
- Gerard Musca Vespaland – Yusaku Yara
- Kyle – Taiten Kusunoki
- Maid A – Yukari Honma
- Maid B – Shizuka Arai
- News announcer – Mari Kishi
- Announcer – Shinichirou Ohta
- Sommelier – Shinpachi Tsuji
- Fake Sommelier – Toru Furusawa
- Cloakroom Woman – Chieko Honda
- Security Police – Yasuhiko Kawazu

== Reception ==
The special ranked first on the Japanese anime television ranking of March 23–29, 2009. The DVD release sold over 7,000 in its first week. The Blu-ray edition was the third best selling anime between July 27 and August 2, 2009, and remained in the top twenty as of November 29, 2009.

Lupin expert Reed Nelson, in writing a feature titled Lupin the Third: The Complete Guide to Films, TV Specials and OVAs for Anime News Network, felt that Lupin the 3rd vs. Detective Conan was not an element of the Lupin franchise that was worth viewing, describing the special as follows: "More parts Case Closed than Lupin the Third, there's a lot of dialogue and not much action. And forget about the 'versus' ... it doesn't happen here".

== Manga adaptation and film sequel ==
A manga adaptation of the special was published in the magazine Shōnen Sunday S August 25 to October 25, 2013.

A theatrical film sequel to the TV special titled Lupin the 3rd vs. Detective Conan: The Movie was released in Japanese cinemas on December 7, 2013.
