= Yukiko Nikaido =

Japanese voice actress (1938–2026)

- 二階堂 有希子
- Born: Kazuko Yagyū; October 27, 1938; Yodobashi Ward, Tokyo Prefecture, Japan
- Died: July 3, 2026 (aged 87)
- Occupations: Actress; voice actress
- Years active: 1960s–1980s
- Agent: Yatsugatake Club (first president)
- Notable credit: Lupin the 3rd Part I as Fujiko Mine
- Spouse: Hiroshi Yagyū (m. 1964; died 2022)
- Children: Shingo Yagyū (1968–2015); Sōsuke Yagyū (born 1972)

Kazuko Yagyū (柳生 加津子, Yagyū Kazuko; née Nikaido, October 27, 1938 – July 3, 2026), known professionally as Yukiko Nikaido (二階堂 有希子, Nikaidō Yukiko), was a Japanese actress. She also served as the first president of the Yatsugatake Club, with her second son Sōsuke Yagyū succeeding her.

Nikaido was married to Japanese actor Hiroshi Yagyū from 1964 until his death in 2022 and her first son was Japanese horticulturist Shingo Yagyū, who died in 2015.

She is best known for voicing Fujiko Mine in the first Lupin III anime series Lupin the 3rd Part I.

== Background ==
Born in Yodobashi Ward, Tokyo on October 27, 1938, Nikaido graduated from the Tokyo Jogakkan Junior and Senior High School.

A member of the ninth class at the Haiyuza Theater Company Training School, she ended up ranking first in the entrance exam, making her considered to be the successor of Kaneko Iwasaki, who was the troupe's leading actress at the time. Around the same time she first met Hiroshi Yagyū, who would become her husband.

Nikaido became a freelancer after working with the Haiyuza Theatre Company, Toei Company, N.A.C. and Mausu Promotion.

She primarily worked as an actress in television dramas and theater. After graduating from the Haiyuza Theater Company, she started appearing in soap operas. She was active as a voice actress since dubbing for the American television crime drama Route 66.

In 1964, she and Hiroshi Yagyū got married, and following the birth of her first son Shingo Yagyū, Nikaido started focusing on her career as a voice actress.

In 1972, following the birth of her second son Sōsuke Yagyū, Nikaido decided to retire from the entertainment industry. Despite this, she continued her career as a voice actress, appearing in anime like 3000 Leagues in Search of Mother, and made appearances under her birth name on variety shows as the wife of her husband.

In 1989, Nikaido became the first president of the Yatsugatake Club, a horticulture facility located in Ōizumi-machi, Hokuto City, Yamanashi Prefecture. She was heavily involved in the facility's management, as she oversaw the café and gallery on the premises.

As of 2013, Nikaido was living with dementia and resided in a nursing facility. She also developed dissociative amnesia around the same time, due to the shock from her first son Shingo's pharyngeal cancer diagnosis in 2014 and subsequent death the following year at age 47.

Nikaido died on July 3, 2026, at the age of 87. Her second son Sōsuke announced the news on July 17 via the Facebook page of Yatsugatake Club.

== Personality ==
As an actress, Nikaido portrayed innocent character roles, due to the public image she had been known for.

In her dubbing career, she served as the Japanese dubbing actress for Mireille Darc, Angie Dickinson and Grace Kelly.

Nikaido's personal hobbies included ballet and playing the piano.

When the Yatsugatake Club opened its café, she created their signature fruit tea, handled all aspects of menu development and handled all management.

== Episodes ==
=== Work ethic ===
As a voice actress, Nikaido said that it started off as a hobby because she found it to be "surprisingly fun and educational".

In regards to her voice acting career in an interview, she said, "I have never really felt that dubbing is a struggle. I enjoy it immensely, always with a sense of tension. I actually feel a bit guilty getting paid for doing something this fun."

Whenever dubbing for an actress, Nikaido made it a firm point to not use the same voice or tone every time, as she wanted to convey that actress's "unique charm" to the audience in a way that stayed respectful to the film, remarking, "I immerse myself in the character's physiological state. Even if I can't quite capture the actual flow of blood, when I get that close to their physical reality, my own voice and rhythm naturally begin to change."

She became a very popular voice actress in the industry, as one time, she had received a fan letter. After reading it, she said, "Wow, you know them better than they know themselves. Voice acting is supposed to be a behind-the-scenes job. Because they can't be seen, the fans' passion seems to become even more intense."

=== Fujiko Mine ===
Nikaido's most famous and signature acting role is voicing Fujiko Mine in Lupin the 3rd Part I.

She was approached with the offer to voice the role of Fujiko, with the producer explaining, "This role requires a voice that can be both cute and dignified. Since Nikaido-san has such a wide vocal range, we would absolutely love to have her on board."

Nikaido speculated that Chikao Ōtsuka and Kiyoshi Kobayashi, whom she had previously worked with in dubbing prior, had recommended her to the staff to voice Fujiko to the staff, saying, "Perhaps my senior colleagues from dubbing (like Chikao Ōtsuka and Kiyoshi Kobayashi) recommended me."

In a later interview, she remarked that despite being not too skilled at performing for anime work, "I was able to naturally settle into Lupin without forcing it."

She also said she overall had "a blast on set" then, saying, "Huddling together around a single microphone, the four veteran actors gave it their all. The intimate atmosphere in the room felt like a close-knit theater troupe, brimming with a powerful sense of unity." and then added, "I was surrounded by caring seniors and I only have fond memories of them looking out for me (laughs)."

Looking back on her time in the role of Fujiko, she said: "My character had such a wide acting range that I constantly had to switch up my expressions, voice and delivery. It was incredibly fun to just let loose and go all out—something I could never experience as a regular television drama actress."

In an interview in 2015, Nikaido revealed that she considered Lupin the 3rd Part I to be a "special project", saying:

"I've spent many years working as an actress, sometimes even playing the lead in TV dramas, but I barely remember those works myself. I also rarely have fans approach me to talk about them. However, this particular project, which only broadcast for half a year (excluding reruns), remains in my own memory, and the fans still love it and keep it close to their heart," adding, "Even now (after my retirement), some people still come all the way to Mt. Yatsugatake and say to me, 'You're the Fujiko Mine from the 1st series, aren't you?' I truly consider myself so lucky to have played the original Fujiko Mine."

The interview ended up being her final entertainment industry activity before her death.

Following the deaths of Yasuo Yamada (Lupin III) in March 1995, Gorō Naya (Inspector Zenigata) in March 2013, Chikao Ōtsuka (Goemon Ishikawa XIII) in January 2015, Makio Inoue (Goemon Ishikawa XIII) in November 2019, Kiyoshi Kobayashi (Daisuke Jigen) in July 2022 and Eiko Masuyama (Fujiko Mine) in May 2024, Nikaido was the last surviving original cast member of the Lupin the 3rd anime series' voice cast alongside current Lupin III voice actor Kanichi Kurita. With her death in July 2026, all of the original Lupin the 3rd anime voice actors have now passed away.

== Filmography ==
=== Television dramas ===
List of performances in television dramas
Year	Title	Role	Notes	Source
1964	Nissan Star Theater: Where To?	Shinko		
1966	The Wandering Ronin: Tsukikage Hyogo	Yae	episode 13	
1969	The Bodyguard Series: I'm The Bodyguard	Oen	episode 12	
1969	The Lonely Ronin: Hanayama Daikichi	Otoshi	episode 33	
1969	Warm Spring	Setsuko Nagashima		
1970	Onihei: The Crime Reports in Edo	Oden	episode 64	
1970	Yae the Hairdresser	Yaeko Tanaka		
1971	Zenigata Heiji	Okiku	episode 257	

=== Theatrical films ===
List of performances in theatrical films
Year	Title	Role	Notes	Source
1959	High Teen	Akiko Tsumura		
1959	Affair in the Mist	Fumi		
1960	Challenge Beneath the Waves	Reiko Shima		
1960	Third World War: 41 Hours of Fear	Mie Ichimura		
1960	Ponkotsu	Chako		
1960	Faceless Violence	Mitsue Ishii		
1960	Billionare	Young Woman		
1961	Botchan Yaro Zoroi	Suzuko Okura		
1961	We Are the Sky Rebels	Spring River		
1961	A Fishwife's Tale	Yoko Ishikawa		

=== Special effects ===
List of performances in special effects
Year	Title	Role	Notes	Source
1970	Chibira-kun	Oku, Beautiful woman		

=== Commercials ===
List of appearances in television commercials
Year	Title	Role	Notes	Source
1969	National Panasonic Washing Machine "Ultra-High-Speed Whirlpool"			

=== Stage ===
List of stage performances
Year	Title	Role	Notes	Source
1963	A Kiss of Heaven and Earth	Mariko		

=== Television animation ===
List of voice performances in television animation
Year	Title	Role	Notes	Source
1969	Kamui	Sugaru		
1971	Lupin the 3rd Part I	Fujiko Mine, Ginko Fujinami	Main role; Ginko Fujinami in episode 7	
1976	3000 Leagues in Search of Mother	Anna, Renata		
1978	One-Million Year Trip: Bander Book	Mrs. Kudo	Television film	
1979	Song of Baseball Enthusiasts	Additional voice	Final anime voice acting role	

=== Dubbing ===
==== Feature films ====
List of dub performances in feature film productions
Title	Role	Notes	Source
The Birds	Melanie Daniels (Tippi Hedren)	TBS version and Fuji Television version	
Marnie	Margaret "Marnie" Edgar (Tippi Hedren)		
She	Ayesha (voiced by Nikki van der Zyl, portrayed by Ursula Andress)	NET version	
The Blue Max	Käti Gräfin von Klugermann (Ursula Andress)	Fuji Television version	
Fleur d'oseille	Catherine (Mireille Darc)		
Detective Belli	Vera Fontana (Florinda Bolkan)		

== See also ==
- List of Japanese actresses
