= The Fuma Conspiracy =

1987 Japanese animated film

Lupin the 3rd: The Fuma Conspiracy
- Theatrical release poster
- Kanji: ルパン三世 風魔一族の陰謀
- Romanization: Rupan Sansei: Fūma Ichizoku no Inbō
- Directed by: Masayuki Ōzeki
- Screenplay by: Makoto Naitō
- Based on: Lupin III by Monkey Punch
- Produced by: Koji Takeuchi
- Starring: Toshio Furukawa; Banjō Ginga; Mami Koyama; Kaneto Shiozawa; Seizō Katō; Mayumi Shō; Kōhei Miyauchi; Masashi Hirose; Shigeru Chiba
- Cinematography: Akio Saitō
- Edited by: Takeshi Seyama
- Music by: Kiyoshi Miyaura
- Production company: Tokyo Movie Shinsha
- Distributed by: Toho
- Release date: December 26, 1987
- Running time: 73 minutes
- Country: Japan
- Language: Japanese

Lupin the 3rd: The Fuma Conspiracy (Japanese: ルパン三世 風魔一族の陰謀, Hepburn: Rupan Sansei Fūma Ichizoku no Inbō; lit. "Lupin III: The Plot of the Fuma Clan") is a 1987 Japanese animated action adventure comedy film. It is the fourth animated feature film based on the 1967–69 manga series Lupin III by Monkey Punch. Although classified as an original video animation by Tokyo Movie Shinsha, it was first given a theatrical release on December 26, 1987, by Toho. Due to budgetary reasons, it utilized a different voice cast from previous animated entries, with Toshio Furukawa as Lupin III, Banjō Ginga as Daisuke Jigen, Mami Koyama as Fujiko Mine, Kaneto Shiozawa as Goemon Ishikawa XIII, and Seizō Katō as Inspector Koichi Zenigata. It was the first Lupin III animation since 1969's Pilot Film to not feature Yasuo Yamada as Lupin and the only one not to feature Kiyoshi Kobayashi as Jigen until 2021's animated television series Lupin III Part 6.

In the film, Lupin and his allies attempt to assist Goemon in rescuing his fiancée Murasaki from a clan of ninjas called the Fuma Clan, all while being chased by a formerly retired Zenigata.

It was released on subtitled VHS and LaserDisc in North America by AnimEigo in 1994 under the "Rupan III" name, due to copyright concerns with Maurice Leblanc's Arsène Lupin. In 2007, Discotek Media released it on DVD under its original name with an English dub.

== Plot ==
Lupin III and his gang are attending the wedding of Goemon Ishikawa XIII and his fiancée Murasaki Suminawa. During the ceremony, the Suminawa family heirloom, a valuable antique urn, is entrusted to Goemon. Before the ceremony is completed, several ninja attack and attempt to steal the urn. Lupin and his colleagues fight off the ninja, but during the confusion, another group of ninja kidnap Murasaki and leave a ransom note proposing to trade Murasaki for the antique urn.

Meanwhile, Inspector Koichi Zenigata has retired to a Buddhist temple following the apparent death of his long-time quarry, Lupin. Kazami, a colleague from the police force, tries to persuade him to return to work. Zenigata has "no interest in a world without Lupin", but when shown a photograph of Lupin taken at the disrupted wedding, Zenigata comes out of retirement and resumes his lifelong pursuit of Lupin.

Lupin and Jigen in their modified Fiat 500, with Inspector Zenigata in pursuit.

At the Suminawa household, Clan Elder Suminawa explains to Goemon that the urn holds the secret location of the Suminawa family treasure. The Fuma Clan ninja, who attacked during the wedding, have been trying to steal the urn for centuries. He refuses to trade the family urn for his granddaughter Murasaki, so Lupin steals it. Lupin and Daisuke Jigen discover that the urn contains a hidden drawing revealing the location of the treasure: a cave deep in the mountains. Lupin, Jigen, and Goemon follow the ransom note instructions and exchange the urn for Murasaki, but the ninja start shooting after Lupin attempts to double-cross them. Zenigata and his officers arrive in time to see Lupin his friends escape on a train. Wanting the treasure for themselves, Lupin and Jigen head on their own to the treasure, with Zenigata and the police in hot pursuit, while Goemon and Murasaki travel their own way, all trying to beat the Fuma Clan to the treasure.

Following a lead, Fujiko Mine tracks down the Fuma Clan headquarters, but they discover and capture her. Among the ranks of the Fuma Clan, Fujiko spots Inspector Kazami, who has secretly been working for the clan's Boss. The Fumas have also discovered the map on the urn, and now that the urn is useless, Kazami puts the urn over Fujiko's head to mock her. The Boss, Kazami, and the ninja leave for the treasure cave. Handcuffed to a thick post, Fujiko manages to escape, and in the process, bashes the urn on her head and notices a golden key among the urn shards. She takes the key and keeps it secret.

After initially discovering the urn is missing, Suminawa travels to the cave and destroys a key lock outside of it, before waiting inside. Later, the Fuma Clan arrive and Suminawa confronts The Boss, but he disarms Suminawa and has him thrown over the cliff. When Murasaki and Goemon arrive, they begin negotiating the trap-laden caves beneath the mountain to find the ancient treasure. Murasaki discovers a secret passage, but the Boss and the Fuma Clan ninjas follow them stealthily.

After reuniting with Lupin, Jigen, and Fujiko, Goemon enters a hall lined with samurai armor, but his entrance has triggered the hall to fill with a hallucinogenic gas. The gas causes him to attack everyone, and in the scuffle he inadvertently injures Murasaki. After surviving the gas, Lupin and company enter a large cavern, where they find an old castle furnished from top to bottom with items of solid gold. They are ambushed by the Fuma Clan, with Lupin, Jigen, and Fujiko dealing with the ninjas, while Goemon faces off against The Boss. During the escapade, Kazami captures Murasaki and holds her hostage at knife point. Not wanting to cause the death of Goemon, Murasaki throws herself off the castle roof, taking the treacherous Kazami with her, though Lupin and Jigen manage to rescue her before she falls to her death. At the same time, Goemon is able to defeat the Boss in battle.

At the cave entrance, Zenigata and his officers rescue Suminawa from the river at the base of the cliff. He explains that the cave is rigged to collapse unless the golden fail-safe key, the one Fujiko found, is inserted into the slot in the entrance, but since he destroyed it, it ensures the treasure's destruction and the Fuma Clan's demise. Zenigata tells him Lupin and company, as well as Murasaki, are in there, so the two rush into the cave, arriving at the castle just in time to tell everyone about the collapse. The Boss stays behind as everything is destroyed around him, dying in the rubble. Zenigata and Suminawa exit via the main tunnel, but Lupin's group exits through a distant tunnel, escaping from Zenigata and his officers once again. Fujiko managed to save a gold roof tile for herself, and rides off on her motorcycle. Goemon bids farewell to his fiancée, declaring that he must undergo training to address his weaknesses; only then will he return to marry Murasaki. She calls out to him, declaring that she won't wait for him. Goemon looks back at Murasaki for a moment, then continues on his journey.

== Cast ==
Character name	Voice actor	
Character name	Japanese	English
Character name	Japanese	Coastal Studios/AnimEigo (1995)
Lupin III	Toshio Furukawa	Rupan III
Lupin III	Toshio Furukawa	Robin Robertson
Daisuke Jigen	Banjō Ginga	Sean P. O'Connell
Fujiko Mine	Mami Koyama	Michele Seidman
Goemon Ishikawa XIII	Kaneto Shiozawa	Mark Franklin
Inspector Koichi Zenigata	Seizō Katō	Marc Matney
Murasaki	Mayumi Shō	Amanda Spivey
Old Man Suminawa	Kōhei Miyauchi	Michael S. Way
Fuuma Boss	Masashi Hirose	Paul Johnson
Kazami	Shigeru Chiba	Dave Underwood
Gakusha	Shigeru Nakahara	Scott Bailey
Squad Leader	Yuu Shimaka	Jim Clark
Police Officers	Kazuaki Koide; Kōichi Yamadera; Tomohiro Nishimura	Patrick Humphrey; Nick Manatee; Dale Roberts
Fuumas	Yuichi Meguro; Kōichi Hashimoto; Toshiharu Sakurai; Naoki Bandō	Floyd Clapton; Gary Lawton; Kevin Greenway; David Pickelsiemer
Madame	Hiroko Emori	Billie Houle
Boy	Akari Hibino	John Houle
Girl	Chie Kōjiro	Rachael Seidman
Woman	Erii Yazaki	Sara Seidman-Vance

== Production ==
Due to budget concerns, TMS decided not to employ the regular voice cast for the OVA, instead going for a slightly less-expensive yet still well-known Aoni Production cast. When the news was broken to Yasuo Yamada, it was not made clear who was responsible for the dismissal, leaving him with the impression that Lupin III's creator Monkey Punch had lobbied the producers for a new voice actor. In reality, Monkey Punch was happy with Yamada's portrayal, but felt that he had no business in telling the production company what to do. Monkey Punch tried to reassure Yamada (with whom he had developed a friendship during the years of Lupin TV series) that he had nothing to do with it, and the regulars were reinstated with the first television special, Bye-Bye Liberty - Close Call!. However, the relationship between Yamada and Monkey Punch was permanently strained by the casting substitution.

Due to the same budget constraints, the usual composer, Yuji Ohno, was replaced with Kiyoshi Miyaura.

The budget focused on the animation. In the background, the characters have a very distinct style, which is not usual in anime, but more common in Western cartoons. Before working on this movie, Telecom Animation Film had done projects in the West, such as The Real Ghostbusters and DuckTales. Two of their employees were Hayao Miyazaki and Yasuo Ōtsuka, who is the supervisor of this film. Lupin's cars are based on the vehicles owned by Hayao Miyazaki, a Citroen 2CV, and Yasuo Ōtsuka, a Fiat 500. By using their own cars as models, they were able to keep the animation consistent throughout production.

The story is located in Japan, so the production staff could easily research the locations and props. For example, the treasure cave mountain is based on a real location in the Gifu Prefecture: Mt Shakujo, as well as the local spa's rotemburo, an outdoor soaking pool, used in the police chase.

== Release details ==
Although classified as an original video animation by TMS, The Fuma Conspiracy was first given a theatrical release on December 26, 1987. The home release followed on April 5, 1988. Due to this, some media consider it to be a theatrical movie.

In the United States, AnimEigo released it in 1994 under the title Rupan III: The Fuma Conspiracy, and referred to the title character as "Rupan" in the English dub and subtitle scripts. Licensor Toho demanded the change out of fear that the estate of Maurice Leblanc, creator of the original Arsene Lupin, would sue for the unauthorized use of the name. In October 2007, a 20th anniversary edition was released by Discotek Media under the title Lupin the 3rd: The Fuma Conspiracy. It is now out of print.

== Critical reception ==
While The Fuma Conspiracy is one of the more highly regarded Lupin III movies in America, it was not well received in Japan. The replacement of the usual voice actors and the usual composer alienated the fans. However, the animation values are exceptionally high, as seen in the police chase through the market. For example, the license plates are legible and the sideswipe scratches are visible, too.

Mike Crandol, writing for Anime News Network, called The Fuma Conspiracy "quite possibly the best-animated installment of the series", far superior to the later TV specials. He praised the chase scenes as the film's highlights and the fact that the characters "express their personality through their movements", something he said is uncommon in anime. However, Crandol stated the "touch-and-go plot" makes it a poor introduction to Lupin III for new viewers and felt that the film was too "rushed". On the voice actor change, he noted that Toshio Furukawa makes Lupin sound like a "novice scamp than the experienced thief from other adventures." Otaku USA's Daryl Surat also called this the best Lupin animation and praised the chase sequences.
