= Lupin the Third: Pilot Film =

- Title card
- Directed by: Masaaki Ōsumi
- Written by: Gisaburō Sugii; Yasuo Otsuka; Tsutomu Shibayama; Jiro Saito; Toshiaki Imaizumi
- Screenplay by: Osamu Kobayashi
- Based on: Lupin III by Monkey Punch
- Produced by: Yutaka Fujioka
- Music by: Norio Maeda
- Production companies: Tokyo Movie; A Production
- Release date: 1969
- Running time: 12 minutes
- Country: Japan
- Language: Japanese

Lupin the Third: Pilot Film (Japanese: ルパン三世〈PILOT FILM〉, Hepburn: Rupan Sansei (Pairotto Firumu)) is a Japanese adult animated short film directed by Masaaki Ōsumi, which was created around 1969. It is the first animated adaptation of the Lupin III manga series, created by Monkey Punch in 1967. The 12-minute film was created by Tokyo Movie and intended to generate interest and secure funding for a larger production. Around 1971 it was reworked as a television pilot with new voice actors and the series was picked up by Yomiuri Television, leading to Lupin the Third Part I.

== Plot ==
The pilot film, loosely based on the manga chapter "Camera Tricks," primarily serves as an introduction to the five major characters, as well as a retired detective named Kogoro Akechi. Each character is introduced to the viewer through several vignettes with narration. The overarching story sees Lupin III, Daisuke Jigen and Fujiko Mine in a mansion surrounded by police led by Inspector Zenigata and Akechi. Goemon Ishikawa offers to help the police by entering the house to kill Lupin. However, Lupin has already exited the building in disguise as Akechi and facilitates Jigen and Fujiko's escape.

== Voice cast ==
Role	Voice actor	
Role	CinemaScope pilot	TV pilot
Lupin III	Nachi Nozawa	Taichirō Hirokawa
Daisuke Jigen	Kiyoshi Kobayashi	Kiyoshi Kobayashi
Fujiko Mine	Eiko Masuyama	Eiko Masuyama
Inspector Zenigata	Shinsuke Chikaishi	Chikao Ōtsuka
Goemon Ishikawa	Gorō Naya	Osamu Kobayashi
Kogoro Akechi	Hitoshi Takagi	Kōichi Kitamura
Narrator	Takuzo Kamiyama	Nobuo Tanaka

== Production ==
Adapting Monkey Punch's Lupin III manga into animation was first suggested by animator Gisaburō Sugii to Yutaka Fujioka, the founder of Tokyo Movie (now TMS Entertainment). Although Fujioka was interested in the idea, Tokyo Movie lacked the financial resources to produce such a project on its own. This led to the creation of a CinemaScope Pilot Film, which was intended to generate interest in the project and secure funding from potential producers. The Pilot Film, consisting of narrated introductions to the five lead characters of the manga, was scripted and animated by Sugii, Yasuo Otsuka, Tsutomu Shibayama and Osamu Kobayashi, with supervision by Masaaki Ōsumi and background art by Reiji Koyama. The music soundtrack was composed by Norio Maeda, while the narration dialogue was written by Jiro Saito and Toshiaki Imaizumi. Yasuo Otsuka had left Toei Animation to join Tokyo Movie, as working on Lupin would allow him to use his knowledge and lifelong interest in guns and transport in his animation. The team studied Monkey Punch's style in detail, including the influence of American cartoonist Mort Drucker on the manga, and analysed the characters from all angles; they were initially assisted by Monkey Punch himself until he felt the project was too much for him. Scripts and treatments were also written for a feature film adaptation, one of which depicted Lupin before the start of his thieving career as a hippie in Shinjuku, and explained how he came to be pursued by the police and other criminals.

Although the animation quality of the Pilot Film was high for the time in which it was made, few financial backers were interested in the project due to its adult themes of violence and sexuality. With the project still unsold over a year later, the Pilot Film was adapted for television. The animation of the TV version was mostly identical to the CinemaScope version, but it featured a largely different voice cast - the only voices who were retained for both versions were those of Kiyoshi Kobayashi (as Jigen) and Eiko Masuyama (as Fujiko). In 1971, Yomiuri Television agreed to produce a TV adaptation of the manga. By this time, only Otsuka and Ōsumi were still at Tokyo Movie. Ōsumi was assigned as director, and Otsuka became the character designer; Osamu Kobayashi provided key animation on several episodes. The series was originally planned for 26 episodes, with synopsis created for each one. Kiyoshi Kobayashi was retained as Jigen for the TV series (and continued to voice the role till 2021), while Gorō Naya and Chikao Ōtsuka, who voiced Goemon in the CinemaScope version of the Pilot Film and Zenigata in the TV version respectively, were assigned the opposite of each other's roles for the series. Yasuo Yamada and Yukiko Nikaido, neither of whom were involved in the Pilot Film, were cast as Lupin and Fujiko. Yamada, known for his dubbing of Clint Eastwood, continues to be widely acclaimed for his serious and humorous portrayals of Lupin, and remains synonymous with the role even after his death in 1995. Masuyama played the one-time character of Catherine in an episode of the series, and eventually replaced Nikaido as Fujiko from the second anime series onward until her retirement in 2010.

== Release ==
The Pilot Film was broadcast on Yomiuri TV on August 17, 1988, and both versions were included on the Lupin III Secret Files (シークレットファイル, Rupan Sansei — Shīkuretto Fairu) VHS in 1989. However, animation from the TV version of the Pilot Film was recycled for several of the series' opening credits sequences, despite Lupin wearing a red jacket in these sequences (it was changed to green for the series at Otsuka's insistence). Both versions of the Pilot Film were released in North America by Discotek Media in their 2012 DVD set of Lupin the Third Part I.

== Reception ==
Chris Beveridge of The Fandom Post wrote that the Pilot Film really captures the feel of the original Lupin III manga in terms of both character designs and the raw sexuality, making for "a really, really fun viewing."
