= Kōhei Miyauchi =

Japanese actor and voice actor (1929-1995)

- 宮内 幸平
- Born: August 4, 1929; Kagoshima, Japan
- Died: June 2, 1995 (aged 65); Tokyo, Japan
- Occupations: Actor, voice actor
- Years active: 1950s–1995
- Notable credit(s): Heidi, Girl of the Alps as Alm-Onji; Ikkyū-san as Gaikan Oshou; Dragon Ball as Master Roshi; Kobo, the Li'l Rascal as Iwao Yamakawa

Takayuki Miyauchi (宮内 孝幸, Miyauchi Takayuki; August 4, 1929 – June 2, 1995), better known by the stage name Kōhei Miyauchi (宮内 幸平, Miyauchi Kōhei), was a Japanese actor and voice actor born in Kagoshima Prefecture. On June 2, 1995, Miyauchi died on his hospital bed at the Nihon University Itabashi Hospital from abdominal varices. At the time of Miyauchi's death, he was represented by Aoni Production.

== Selected voice roles ==
=== Television animation ===
- Ōgon Bat (1967) (Hossein)
- Andersen Stories (1971) (Eliza's Father)
- Heidi, Girl of the Alps (1974) (Alm-Onji)
- La Seine no Hoshi (1975) (Francis, Holy Roman Emperor)
- Space Battleship Yamato III (1980) (Shalibart Elder)
- The Wonderful Adventures of Nils (1980) (Rosenbaum)
- Dr. Slump (1981) (Kami-sama)
- Manga Nihon-shi (1984) (Honda Masanobu)
- Fist of the North Star (1984) (Jūkei, Lin's Village Elder Ukoku, Mako and Aki's grandfather, Mamiya's Village Elder, Sojin)
- Bosco Adventure (1986) (Ender)
- Dragon Ball (1986) (Kame-Sennin (Master Roshi))
- Saint Seiya (1987) (Mitsumasa Kido)
- Dragon Ball Z (1989) (Kame-Sennin)
- Ranma ½ (1989) (Manpukuji Priest)
- Sailor Moon (1992) (Fortune Teller, ep 2)
- Magic Knight Rayearth (1994) (Chang Ang)

=== OVA ===
- Prefectural Earth Defense Force (1986) (Dr. Inoue)
- Legend of the Galactic Heroes (1988) (Klaus Von Lichtenlade)
- Nozomi Witches (1992) (Eddie)
- Ys (1992) (Frea)
- 3×3 Eyes (1995) (Grandpa Ayanokoji)

=== Theatrical animation ===
- Lupin III: The Castle of Cagliostro (1979) (Gardener)
- Nausicaä of the Valley of the Wind (1984) (Gol)
- Super Mario Bros.: The Great Mission to Rescue Princess Peach! (1986) (Mushroom Hermit)
- Lupin III: The Fuma Conspiracy (1987) (Old Man Suminawa)
- Dragon Ball film series (1986-1993) (Kame-Sennin)
- Crayon Shin-chan: The Secret Treasure of Buri Buri Kingdom (1994) (King)

=== Video games ===
- Hokuto no Ken for Sega Saturn and PlayStation (1995) (Jūkei)
- Policenauts (1995) (Victor Jurgens)
- Dragon Ball Z: Ultimate Battle 22 (1995) (Kame-Sennin) (Recorded his lines before his death)

=== Dubbing ===
==== Live-action ====
- The Cassandra Crossing (1979 NTV edition) (Herman Kaplan (Lee Strasberg))
- Chances Are (Judge Fenwick (Josef Sommer))
- The Empire Strikes Back (1980 Movie theater edition) (Admiral Ozzel (Michael Sheard))
- Funeral in Berlin (1972 TV Tokyo edition) (Hallam (Hugh Burden))
- The Godfather Part II (1980 NTV edition) (Hyman Roth (Lee Strasberg))
- Gremlins 2: The New Batch (Grandpa Fred (Robert Prosky))
- Home Alone 2: Lost in New York (E.F. Duncan (Eddie Bracken))
- Licence to Kill (VHS version) (M (Robert Brown))
- Mad Max 2 (1991 TV Asahi edition) (Curmudgeon (Syd Heylen))
- Mysterious Island (1975 NTV edition) (Gideon Spilitt (Gary Merrill))
- Patton (Field Marshal Sir Bernard Law Montgomery (Michael Bates))
- The Poseidon Adventure (1983 NTV edition) (Chaplain John (Arthur O'Connell))

==== Animation ====
- Disney's Adventures of the Gummi Bears (King Gregor)
- Sonic the Hedgehog (King Maximilian Acorn)
- Thomas the Tank Engine and Friends (Sir Topham Hatt (Season 1–4) and The Vicar (Season 2))
