= Toni Barry =

British voice actress

- Born: 26 June 1961 (age 65); Peterborough, Cambridgeshire, England United Kingdom
- Occupation: Voice actress
- Years active: 1973–2002

Toni Barry (born 26 June 1961) is a British voice actress. She is also known to fans of the television show Press Gang as Spike's American girlfriend Zoe.

== Selected filmography ==
- Project A-ko – Asa
- Dangaioh – Dira (uncredited)
- Gall Force: Earth Chapter – Sandy Newman
- Mystery of Mamo – Fujiko Mine
- Lupin the 3rd: Bye Bye, Lady Liberty – Fujiko Mine
- Legend of the Four Kings – Matsuri Toba (UK English dub only)
- Roujin Z – Haruko
- Dominion: Tank Police – Leona Osaki
- X – Karen Kasumi
- Space Channel 5: Part 2 (video game) – Pine
- Press Gang – Zoe (series 3, 1991)
- Patlabor: The Movie – Noa Izumi
- Patlabor 2: The Movie – Noa Izumi
- Moomin – Snork Maiden, Little My
- Lapitch the Little Shoemaker – Various Voices
- Teletubbies – Voice Trumpets, Talking Flowers
- Labyrinth – Stepmother (uncredited)
- Tears Before Bedtime – Debbie
- A House in the Hills – Susie
- Sweating Bullets – Amanda
- Ben Elton: The Man from Auntie – Swimsuit Model, Doreen, Oompah Audience Member
- Unnatural Pursuits – 1st Actress
- Endgame – Nikke Bergman
- Proteus – Linda
- The Armando Iannucci Shows – Guest Star
- Twipsy – Various Voices (as Toni Barrie)
