= Eiko Masuyama =

Japanese voice actress (1936–2024)

- 増山 江威子
- Born: Tomoko Masada (政田 知子); April 22, 1936; Tokyo City, Tokyo Prefecture, Japan
- Died: May 20, 2024 (aged 88)
- Occupations: Actress; voice actress; narrator
- Years active: 1957–2024
- Agent: Aoni Production
- Notable work: Lupin III as Fujiko Mine; Cutie Honey as Honey Kisaragi
- Height: 155 cm (5 ft 1 in)
- Spouse: Kazuki Masada (政田 一喜) (died 2022)
- Children: 1

Eiko Masuyama (増山 江威子, Masuyama Eiko; born Tomoko Masada (政田 知子, Masada Tomoko), April 22, 1936 – May 20, 2024) was a Japanese actress and narrator. She was affiliated with Aoni Production at the time of her death. She was most known for originating the roles of Fujiko Mine in Lupin III, Honey Kisaragi in Cutie Honey, and Bakabon's Mama in Tensai Bakabon.

== Biography ==
=== Early life ===
Eiko Masuyama was born on April 22, 1936, the youngest of four sisters. When she was young she spoke slowly. Her teacher told her "You can't talk properly". At age 12, she joined the Children's Theater Company to improve her speech. She studied under Miyoko Asō, overcoming the complex. She later became interested in acting.

=== Career ===
When Masuyama was too old for the children's company, Sanno theatrical company was launched by actors Sandayū Dokumamushi and Yasushi Inayoshi.

She became a member of Aoni Production in the 1960s. She began to focus on voice acting because of its scheduling flexibility, to balance childcare and work.

Masuyama focused on narration, but in anime works she sometimes reprised the voices of earlier characters.

=== Final years and death ===
In 2017, she was awarded the "Anime Outreach Category" at the Tokyo Anime Award Festival 2017.

In 2021, she won the "Merit Award" at the 15th Seiyu Awards.

Masuyama died of pneumonia on May 20, 2024, at the age of 88. Her death was announced a month later by Aoni.

== Filmography ==
=== Television animation ===
List of voice performances in television animation
Year	Title	Role	Notes	Source
1963	8 Man	Manami		
1963	Astro Boy	Lucia, Kipiah		
1965	Kimba the White Lion	Additional voice		
1965	Super Jetter	Nanae		
1965	Prince Planet	Rico		
1966	Leo the Lion	Rukio		
1966	Harris no Kaze	Kunimatsu's mother		
1966	Sally the Witch	Yumiko		
1967	Gokū no Daibōken	Tatsuko		
1968	Star of the Giants	Lumi Tachibana, Samon Chiyo		
1968	Sabu to Ichi Torimono Hikae	Additional voice		
1968	The World of Hans Christian Andersen	Karen		
1969	Lupin the Third: Pilot Film	Fujiko Mine		
1969	Attack No. 1	Midori Hayakawa		
1969	Moomin	Additional voice		
1971	Andersen Monogatari	Candy, Anna		
1971	Shin Obake no Q-Tarō	U-ko		
1971	Marvelous Melmo	Additional voice		
1971	Tensai Bakabon	Bakabon's Mama		
1972	Dokonjō Gaeru	Pyonko		
1972	Devilman	Fire, Bella		
1972	Mahōtsukai Chappy	Chappy Hans Charles Grimm and Aesop Et Cetera		
1972	Lupin the Third Part I	Catherine Martin	Ep. 14	
1973	Jungle Kurobe	Mama Sarari		
1973	Microsuperman	Additional voice		
1973	Fables of the Green Forest	Polly		
1973	Cutie Honey	Honey Kisaragi		
1974	Karate Master	Rikuya		
1974	Great Mazinger	Cleo		
1974	Vicky the Viking	Narrator		
1974	Hoshi no Ko Chobin	Queen Ekurea		
1975	Arabian Nights: Sinbad's Adventures	Additional voice		
1975	Ikkyū-san	Ikkyuu's mother, Narrator, Tsubane Iyono		
1975	Gamba no Bōken	Oryuu, Shioji		
1975	Laura, the Prairie Girl	Caroline Ingalls		
1975	Ganso Tensai Bakabon	Bakabon's Mama		
1975	Maya the Honey Bee	Additional voice		
1976	Divine Demon-Dragon Gaiking	Additional voice		
1976	UFO Warrior Dai Apolon	Additional voice		
1976	Little Lulu and Her Little Friends	Little Lulu	First voice, Eps 1–3	
1976	Candy Candy	Jane Brighton		
1977	Lupin the Third Part II	Fujiko Mine		
1977	The Wild Swans	Elisa/Adult Elisa		
1978	Nobody's Boy: Remi	Additional voice		
1978	Starzinger	Prof. Kitty		
1978	Captain Future	Joan Randall		
1978	Haikara-San: Here Comes Miss Modern	Kichiji		
1980	Space Warrior Baldios	Amy Ratein		
1980	Back to the Forest	Mary		
1981	Good Morning! Spank	Aiko's mother		
1981	Dogtanian and the Three Muskehounds	Milady		
1982	Andromeda Stories	Additional voice		
1982	Urusei Yatsura	Misuzu	Ep. 43	
1982	The Kabocha Wine	Hanae Aoba; Komachi		
1982	The Mysterious Cities of Gold	Additional voice		
1982	Dr Slump	Ribon-chan		
1982	Boku Patalliro!	Afro 18		
1983	Story of the Alps: My Annette	Additional voice		
1983	Perman	Perman #3 (Sumire Hoshino)		
1983	Cat's Eye	Lupin's Bride/Henriette Lubelle		
1984	Lupin III Part III	Fujiko Mine		
1985	New Little Ghost Q-Tarō	U-ko		
1986	Maple Town Stories	Christine		
1987	Lady Lady!!	Magdalene Waverley		
1988	Little Lord Fauntleroy	Mina		
1988	Himitsu no Akko-chan	Queen of the Mirror Country		
1989	Lupin the 3rd: Bye Bye, Lady Liberty!	Fujiko Mine	Television special	
1990	Heisei Tensai Bakabon	Bakabon's Mama		
1990	Lupin the 3rd: The Hemingway Papers	Fujiko Mine	Television special	
1990	Magical Taruruto-kun	Ina Kawai		
1991	Mischievous Twins: The Tales of St. Clare's	Mrs. Wentworth		
1991	Lupin the 3rd: Steal Napoleon's Dictionary!	Fujiko Mine	Television special	
1992	Let's Go! Anpanman	Mimi-sensei, Queen of Darkness, Witch, Princess Black Snow, Miss Autumn Wind	First voice of Queen of Darkness, Witch, Miss Autumn Wind, Second voice of Mimi-sensei	
1992	Lupin the 3rd: From Russia with Love	Fujiko Mine	Television special	
1993	Lupin the 3rd: Orders to Assassinate Lupin	Fujiko Mine	Television special	
1994	Lupin the 3rd: Burn, Zantetsuken!	Fujiko Mine	Television special	
1995	World Fairy Tale Series	Evil Queen	Ep. 8	
1995	Lupin the 3rd: The Pursuit of Harimao's Treasure	Fujiko Mine	Television special	
1996	Lupin the 3rd: The Secret of Twilight Gemini	Fujiko Mine	Television special	
1997	Cutie Honey Flash	Mitsuko Kanzaki		
1997	Lupin the 3rd: Walther P-38	Fujiko Mine	Television special	
1998	Mamotte Shugogetten	Meihua (Plum Blossom)		
1998	Lupin the 3rd: Memories of Blaze ~Tokyo Crisis~	Fujiko Mine	Television special	
1999	Lupin the 3rd: Da Capo of Love ~Fujiko's Unlucky Days~	Fujiko Mine	Television special	
1999	Rerere no Tensai Bakabon	Bakabon's Mama		
2000	Lupin the 3rd: $1 Money Wars	Fujiko Mine	Television special	
2001	Detective Boy Kageman	Beauty Face	First voice	
2001	Lupin the 3rd: Alcatraz Connection	Fujiko Mine	Television special	
2002	Weiß Kreuz Glühen	Queen		
2002	Lupin the 3rd Episode 0: First Contact	Fujiko Mine	Television special	
2003	Lupin the 3rd: Operation Return the Treasure	Fujiko Mine	Television special	
2004	Lupin the 3rd: Stolen Lupin ~The Copy Cat is a Midsummer's Butterfly~	Fujiko Mine	Television special	
2005	Great Detective Conan	Fusae Campbell Kinoshita	Debuts in Ep. 421	
2005	Lupin the 3rd: An Angel's Tactics ~Fragments of a Dream Are the Scent of Murder~	Fujiko Mine	Television special	
2006	Lupin the 3rd: Seven Days Rhapsody	Fujiko Mine	Television special	
2007	Lupin the 3rd: The Elusiveness of the Fog	Fujiko Mine	Television special	
2008	Lupin the 3rd: Sweet Lost Night ~The Magic Lamp's Nightmare Premonition~	Fujiko Mine	Television special	
2009	Lupin III vs. Detective Conan	Fujiko Mine	Television special	
2010	Lupin the 3rd: The Last Job	Fujiko Mine	Television special	

=== Theatrical animation ===
List of voice performances in theatrical animation
Year	Title	Role	Notes	Source
1968	Fables From Hans Christian Andersen	Karen		
1969	Hitori Botchi	Ken's mother		
1970	Attack No. 1: The Movie	Yumi Katsura		
1970	Attack No. 1: Revolution	Satomi Yoshimura		
1970	Attack No. 1: World Championship	Shellenina		
1970	The Kindly Lion	Mother		
1971	Attack No. 1: Immortal Bird	Midori Hayakawa		
1971	Do It! Yasuji's Pornorama	Slut in the Park, Car Customer, Blonde Woman at the Airport		
1971	Animal Treasure Island	Gran		
1976	Puss 'n Boots Travels Around the World	Suzanna		
1977	The Wild Swans	Eliza/Adult Eliza		
1978	Lupin the 3rd: Lupin vs. the Clone	Fujiko Mine		
1979	Lupin the 3rd: The Castle of Cagliostro	Fujiko Mine		
1980	Toward the Terra	Terra No.5		
1981	Kaibutsu-kun: Invitation to Monster Land	Kaiko-chan		
1982	Kaibutsu-kun: The Demon Sword	Kaiko-chan		
1982	Queen Millennia	Permanent Administrator		
1982	Dr. Slump: "Hoyoyo!" Space Adventure	Ribbon-chan		
1982	Arcadia of My Youth	The Witch		
1983	Dr. Slump and Arale-chan: Hoyoyo! The Great Race Around the World	Additional voice		
1983	Aesop's Fable	Goddess of Spring		
1984	The Kabocha Wine: Nita no Aijou Monogatari	Komachi		
1984	Shonen Keniya	Yoko Murakami		
1984	Ninja Hattori-kun + Perman: Superpower Wars	Perman #3 (Sumire Hoshino)		
1985	Little Memole	Narrator		
1985	Ninja Hattori-kun + Perman: Ninja Beast Jippō vs. Miracle Egg	Perman #3 (Sumire Hoshino)		
1985	Penguin's Memory: A Tale of Happiness	Susan		
1985	Lupin the 3rd: Legend of the Gold of Babylon	Fujiko Mine		
1990	Kennosuke-sama	Kennosuke's mother	Short film	
1994	Sailor Moon S: The Movie	Princess Snow Kaguya		
1994	Let's Go! Anpanman: The Lyrical Magical Witch's School	Witch		
1995	Lupin the 3rd: Die! Nostradamus	Fujiko Mine		
1996	Lupin the 3rd: Dead or Alive	Fujiko Mine		
2003	Pa-Pa-Pa The Movie: Perman	Perman #3 (Sumire Hoshino)	Short film	
2004	Pa-Pa-Pa The Movie: Perman – Octopus with a Pop! Legs with a Pon!	Perman #3 (Sumire Hoshino)	Short film	

=== Dubbing ===
==== Live-action ====
- The Sound of Music (Baroness Elsa von Schraeder (Eleanor Parker))

==== Animation ====
- Josie and the Pussycats (Melody Valentine)

== Awards ==
Year	Award	Category	Result	Ref.
2021	15th Seiyu Awards	Merit Award	Won	
