= Bye Bye, Lady Liberty =

1989 television film directed by Osamu Dezaki

- Lupin the 3rd: Bye Bye, Lady Liberty
- North American cover artwork by Discotek Media

ルパン三世 バイバイ·リバティー危機一発! (Rupan Sansei Baibai Ribatī – Kiki Ippatsu!)
- Created by: Monkey Punch
- Anime television film
- Directed by: Osamu Dezaki
- Produced by: Hidehiko Takei; Motoyoshi Tokunaga; Yutaka Yasuda
- Written by: Junichi Iioka (Note: Scenario Director (シナリオディレクター)); Hiroshi Kashiwabara (Note: Screenplay (脚本))
- Music by: Yuji Ohno
- Studio: Tokyo Movie Shinsha
- Licensed by: NA: Discotek Media
- Original network: NNS (NTV)
- Released: April 1, 1989
- Runtime: 97 minutes

Lupin the 3rd: Bye Bye, Lady Liberty (ルパン三世 バイバイ·リバティー危機一発!, Rupan Sansei Baibai Ribatī – Kiki Ippatsu!; Lupin III: Bye-Bye Liberty – Close Call!) (Note: Prior to its North American release, the film's title was usually translated by fans as Bye Bye Liberty Crisis. "Crisis" is an oversimplified interpretation of "Kiki Ippatsu" (危機一発), as the first two kanji characters do mean "crisis", but the last renders the phrase to describe "a close call", "a narrow escape" or "in the nick of time". When preparing the film's North American DVD release, Discotek Media and Reed Nelson opted to name the film Bye Bye, Lady Liberty as a median between the Japanese title and the film's British title, Goodbye Lady Liberty.) is the first television special in the Lupin III franchise. Directed by veteran director Osamu Dezaki, it was broadcast by Nippon Television on April 1, 1989. A number of Lupin III television specials have followed with a total of 28 airing as of November 2019, including a crossover special with Detective Conan.

== Plot ==
Lupin is forced to give up his life of crime when he encounters Michael, a young boy who demonstrates that police computers are able to predict his every move. His retirement is short-lived when his colleague Jigen learns the location of the giant diamond called the Super Egg which was stolen from the Three Masons, (Note: Known as "Conquer the Universe, Inc." in the English dub.) a sinister secret society. The Egg is hidden in the Statue of Liberty and Lupin helps recover the diamond by stealing the entire Statue. Meanwhile, Goemon becomes bodyguard to Isabelle, a fancy dressed woman who is also seeking the Super Egg. It transpires that Michael is the son of the woman, Isabelle Silverman, Number 2 of the Masons and a computer scientist who invented the Neovirus. She conspires with Jimmy, Number 3, to get the Super Egg and kill number 1 to take over the Masons. However, once they have the egg, Jimmy fatally stabs Isabelle and releases the Neovirus. The virus causes the US and USSR to prepare their nuclear missiles for launch, but Lupin helps Michael to halt the computer program and avert a global disaster.

== Voice cast ==
| Character | Voice actor | |
| Character | Japanese | English |
| Character | Japanese | World Wide Sound/Manga UK (1996) |
|---|---|---|
| Arsène Lupin III | Yasuo Yamada | Wolf III |
| Arsène Lupin III | Yasuo Yamada | William Dufris |
| Daisuke Jigen | Kiyoshi Kobayashi | Eric Meyers |
| Fujiko Mine | Eiko Masuyama | Toni Barry |
| Goemon Ishikawa XIII | Makio Inoue | Goemon the Samurai |
| Goemon Ishikawa XIII | Makio Inoue | Garrick Hagon |
| Inspector Koichi Zenigata | Gorou Naya | Seán Barrett |
| Michael | Mayumi Tanaka | Sue Sheridon |
| Isabel | Yui Komazuka | Isabella |
| Isabel | Yui Komazuka | Liza Ross |
| Jimmy Cants | Masane Tsukayama | Jimmy Smith |
| Jimmy Cants | Masane Tsukayama | Peter Marinker |
| Silverman | Michio Sakiyama | Don Fellows |
| Ed | Kenichi Ogata | Colin Bruce |
| Jones | Unshou Ishizuka | Bob Sherman |
| Rooster | Tamio Ooki | Bob Sherman |
| Judy | Naoko Kouda | Sue Sheridon |
| News Anchor | Minoru Inaba | Toni Barry; Colin Bruce |
| Cab Driver | Yousuke Akimoto | Bob Sherman |
| Computer | Kenyu Horiuchi | Toni Barry; Don Fellows |
| French Police Officer | Mitsuaki Hoshino | Garrick Hagon |
| Sheriff | Atsushi Ii | Colin Bruce |

== Production ==
The special was directed by Osamu Dezaki, an experienced anime director who had previously storyboarded several episodes of Lupin The Third Part I. In addition Dezaki created the storyboards under the pseudonym Makura Saki, something he commonly did despite being well known for creating his own storyboards.

During his career Dezaki created many animation techniques that became standard in the Japanese animation industry and are used throughout the special. One of his best known techniques "Postcard memories", also commonly known as "Harmony" involved adding painted lines to a cel to give the appearance of a watercolor effect and provide visual impact with minimal animation. While this technique is normally used to end a scene, during the special it is also used during action scenes. Another signature technique used during the special is the "triple take" where a cel is moved quickly across the camera multiple times to produce a sense of speed. The name comes from its typical usage of 3 passes of the cel. Lighting techniques used techniques include backlit backgrounds, gel effects, lighting bloom in the corner of a scene and diagonal spotlights across heavily shadowed images to produce a sense of darkness. other techniques include Parallax scrolling to give depth to city scenes, split screens and dutch angle.

== Release ==
Bye, Bye Lady Liberty was broadcast on April 4, 1989.

VAP have published several home releases of the special in Japan. At first the special was released as both a VHS and a Laserdisc edition. They then released the special on DVD on December 22, 1999, and again in April 2006. A DVD containing both Liberty and the next special, Hemingway Papers was released by Futabasha on July 4, 2014. The soundtrack was released on October 21, 2000.

Manga Entertainment UK released an English dubbed VHS as Goodbye Lady Liberty in the United Kingdom on 9 September 1996. Due to copyright issues with the Maurice Leblanc estate, Lupin was renamed "Wolf" in the dub. Discotek Media released the special on DVD in North America as Lupin The Third: Bye Bye Lady Liberty on March 25, 2014, and later on Blu-ray on June 26, 2018.

== Reception ==
In 500 Essential Anime Movies, Helen McCarthy called Liberty her personal favourite of the Lupin TV specials. She describes it as "light, funny and entertaining" and "terrific entertainment". Reviewing Liberty for Manga Mania, John Spencer felt it was a "rather routine television movie, with none of the flair and style of the previous films". He compares the secrecy of one of the characters to Scooby-Doo and in summary describes the film as "not classic Lupin...but good enough". Lupin expert Reed Nelson expressed that although Liberty is superior to several of the specials that followed it, it suffers from uneven pacing and a climax comparable to The Mystery of Mamo.

Writing for The Fandom Post, Darius Washington noted the techniques used by Dezaki on Golgo 13: The Professional worked well with the special. He called the UK dub "solid" with the exception of one scene and highlighted the special as one of the better feature length entries in the series.
