= Maki Carrousel =

Japanese actress

- カルーセル 麻紀
- Born: November 26, 1942 (age 83); Kushiro, Hokkaido, Japan
- Occupations: Actress and singer
- Years active: 1963–present
- Agent: Office Carrousel

Maki Hirahara (平原 麻紀, Hirahara Maki), born November 26, 1942, in Kushiro, Hokkaido, Japan and known as Maki Carrousel (カルーセル 麻紀, Karūseru Maki), is a Japanese transgender actress who is represented by the talent agency Office Carrousel.

== Life ==
Carrousel underwent two stages of sex reassignment surgery, once in 1964 and then again in 1973 in Morocco. She took her name from the cabaret Le Carrousel de Paris, famous for its transgender performers.

== Filmography ==
=== Television ===
Year	Title	Role	Notes	Ref.
2012	SPEC: Shō	Tarot Aunt		

=== Films ===
Year	Title	Role	Notes	Ref.
1985	Lupin III: The Legend of the Gold of Babylon	Marciano (voice)		
2024	Voice	Maki		

== Awards and nominations ==
Year	Award	Category	Work(s)	Result	Ref.
2024	37th Nikkan Sports Film Awards	Best Supporting Actress	Voice	Nominated	
2025	79th Mainichi Film Awards	Best Supporting Performance	Voice	Won	
2025	67th Blue Ribbon Awards	Best Supporting Actress	Voice	Nominated	
