= Lupin the 3rd (film) =

2014 Japanese heist film by Ryuhei Kitamura

Lupin III
- Theatrical release poster

Japanese name
- Kanji: ルパン三世
Transcriptions
- Revised Hepburn: Rupan Sansei
- Directed by: Ryuhei Kitamura
- Screenplay by: Mataichirō Yamamoto
- Story by: Mataichirō Yamamoto; Ryuhei Kitamura; Joey O'Bryan
- Based on: Lupin III by Monkey Punch
- Produced by: Mataichirō Yamamoto
- Starring: Shun Oguri; Jerry Yan; Tetsuji Tamayama; Gō Ayano; Meisa Kuroki; Tadanobu Asano; Kim Joon; Thanayong Wongtrakul; Nirut Sirijanya; Nick Tate
- Cinematography: Pedro J. Márquez
- Edited by: Shūichi Kakesu
- Music by: Aldo Shllaku; Tomoyasu Hotei
- Production companies: TBS Pictures; Kadokawa Pictures; Tristone Entertainment; Avex Pictures; TMS Entertainment; East Japan Marketing & Communications Inc.; Toho; KDDI Corporation; RKB Mainichi Broadcasting Corporation; Mainichi Broadcasting System; CBC Television; GyaO; Hokkaido Broadcasting Company; Tohan Company
- Distributed by: Toho
- Release date: August 30, 2014
- Running time: 133 minutes
- Country: Japan
- Languages: English; Japanese
- Budget: $10 million
- Box office: $22.3 million

Lupin III (Japanese: ルパン三世, Hepburn: Rupan Sansei) is a 2014 Japanese heist film directed by Ryuhei Kitamura and based on the 1967–69 manga series of the same name by Monkey Punch. The film stars an ensemble cast featuring Shun Oguri, Jerry Yan, Tetsuji Tamayama, Gō Ayano, Meisa Kuroki and Tadanobu Asano. It is the second live action film adaptation of the manga, following Lupin III: Strange Psychokinetic Strategy (1974).

The film is an origin story that presents its characters in a modernized context, and follows the title character as he forms his thieving gang to steal a Cleopatran necklace while facing opposition from Michael Lee, his rival, and Pramuk, a crime boss.

Lupin the 3rd premiered in Japan on August 30, 2014, and made its international premiere at LA EigaFest 2014. Although financially successful, critical and audience opinions of the film were mixed to negative, with criticism frequently focusing on the film's derivative and convoluted narrative. Other areas of the production, such as the cast's delivery of the screenplay's largely English dialogue, were also frequently targeted for criticism.

== Plot ==
Lupin the 3rd, grandson of the legendary gentleman thief Arsène Lupin, is a member of the international thieves' guild "The Works", which specializes in stealing valuable objects from wealthy owners. Lupin beats his fellow Works members Fujiko Mine (his would-be lover), Pierre (a computer genius) and Jiro to the theft of an ancient Olympic medal in Singapore, but is forced to surrender it to his rival, Michael Lee, when he threatens to kill him and Fujiko. At a meeting of The Works, Fujiko is hailed as the culprit behind the theft (thanks to her machinations), and Thomas Dawson, the leader of the organization and Lupin's mentor, shows them the most valuable item in The Works' possession: the Crimson Heart of Cleopatra, a necklace commissioned by Mark Antony to symbolize his love for the Queen of the Nile. However, a ruby of Cleopatra's intended to complete the necklace is missing. A trio of thugs led by Michael – Royal, Saber and Maria – steal the necklace and kill Jiro and Dawson, apparently in revenge for "Edward Lam", resulting in the disbanding of The Works. Devastated by Dawson's murder, Lupin, Fujiko, Pierre and Daisuke Jigen join forces to find Michael and the necklace.

Within a year, Lupin and Jigen have established themselves as accomplished thieves, but Jigen grows weary of following Fujiko's false leads. While meeting with her, Lupin is turned in to the police in Thailand. He then meets Interpol Inspector Koichi Zenigata, who informs him that Michael, using the alias Georgio Zhang, is arranging a major auction with Momrachiao Pramuk, the chairman of Navarone Security and a crime lord in secret. Zenigata wants Lupin to 'steal' the items that they intend to sell to each other for the police so that he can arrest them; in exchange, Lupin's criminal record will be erased. Lupin begrudgingly accepts, and enlists Goemon Ishikawa XIII into the gang.

Fujiko meets with Michael, who explains that Edward Lam was a member of The Works and a father figure to them both, but after helping Dawson find the Crimson Heart and the accompanying ruby in Egypt, Dawson betrayed and killed him, and Pramuk stole the ruby. Michael intends to buy the ruby to complete the necklace. Lupin, who has been spying on the pair, tells Michael that no matter who wins the auction, he will steal the necklace. At the auction, Michael and Pramuk prepare to sell each other the necklace and the ruby respectively. During the transaction, Pramuk tells Michael that he was a former member of The Works, and killed Lam while trying to kill Dawson. Michael attempts to kill himself and Pramuk before the latter can buy the necklace, but Pramuk reveals that Royal, who (along with Saber and Maria) now works for him, disarmed the explosives. Pramuk buys the ruby for $200 million, and Michael destroys his reward cheque in defeat. Lupin, having listened to Michael and Pramuk's exchange via lip reading technology, calls off the theft to Zenigata's frustration.

Disheartened, Michael offers to join Lupin's gang to steal back the Crimson Heart and ruby from the Ark, Pramuk's stronghold, and is accepted. Lupin and Michael enter the Ark disguised as Zenigata and Commander Narong of the Thai Army, and upload a virus into the Ark's networks in the guise of a calling card from Lupin.

Jigen, Goemon and Fujiko attack the Ark's main defenses, defeating Royal, Saber and Maria in the process, while Lupin and Michael, aided by Pierre and Joseph (a hacker), along with prior research made by Goemon, penetrate the security defenses protecting the Crimson Heart. Pramuk traps the pair in the vault, intending to suffocate them. Michael places Lupin in the vault's safe and blows the vault door up, killing himself but saving Lupin. Lupin and the others are handed over by Pramuk to Zenigata and Narong, but they instead arrest Pramuk for his crimes, using the Crimson Heart as evidence. Zenigata then discovers too late that the necklace and ruby given to him by Lupin were fakes.

Later, Lupin unsuccessfully tries to get Fujiko to wear the Crimson Heart, and Zenigata returns to pursue them. Fujiko takes the necklace and escapes while Lupin and Jigen escape together in their Fiat 500.

== Cast ==
- Shun Oguri as Lupin the 3rd
- Jerry Yan as Michael Lee
- Meisa Kuroki as Fujiko Mine
- Tetsuji Tamayama as Daisuke Jigen
- Gō Ayano as Goemon Ishikawa XIII
- Tadanobu Asano as Koichi Zenigata
- Kim Joon as Pierre
- Nirut Sirijanya as Pramuk
- Rhatha Phongam as Miss V
- Vithaya Pansringarm as Commander Narong
- Nick Tate as Thomas Dawson
- Thanayong Wongtrakul as Royal
- Kazutaka Yoshino as Saber
- Yuka Nakayama as Maria
- Kohtee Aramboy as Joseph
- Geoffrey Giuliano as Anatoli
- Yoshiyuki Yamaguchi as Jiro
- David Asavanond as Ajit
- Sahajak Boonthanakit as Security Head
- Carl Wolf as Arsène Lupin

Monkey Punch and Yu Yamada (Shun Oguri's wife) make cameo appearances as a passenger and air hostess respectively on Lupin and Jigen's flight from Japan to Thailand.

== Production ==
=== Development and writing ===
In 2003, Schindler's List and Minority Report producer Gerald R. Molen, through his production company WhiteLight Entertainment, purchased the live-action film adaptation rights to the Lupin III franchise. Molen noted that the five main characters would be featured in an upcoming film, and that some creative licence would have to be taken to "make the story work". Monkey Punch, the creator of the original manga, expressed no desire in being involved in the production of the film. A year later, David Ranes and Chet Thomas were named as the film's screenwriters, and the release date was set as being late spring 2006. This release date was later pushed back to 2009, by which point the film had still not formally entered production. In late 2009, ex-astronaut Buzz Aldrin, along with his then-wife Lois Cannon and daughter Lisa Cannon, sued WhiteLight and Guardian Pictures for breach of contract and fraud, as he had invested $200,000 into the production companies on the pretext that they were using the funds to make films that were never produced, including Lupin III.

Lupin's basically a "superman". He's wiser than everyone and he's always ten steps ahead. So [Mataichirō Yamamoto] thought – and this part I agree with – it's extremely hard to make drama around [Lupin] because there's not much struggle. He's always right and he always wins. But we still need somebody who can drive the story. That's why we came up with the idea of this enemy character Michael Lee but then the problem was we're not making Michael Lee, we're making Lupin the Third. It's just a matter of balance.

— Kitamura on the creation of Michael Lee

In 2011, Japanese producer Mataichirō Yamamoto acquired the adaptation rights, and hired Ryuhei Kitamura, with whom he had previously collaborated with on Azumi, to co-write a new screenplay with him and direct the film. Over "three or four months", the pair extensively studied the franchise by reading the manga and watching the anime adaptations before deciding that their film would not be directly based on any of them, and would serve as a modernized origin story for the Lupin Gang. They also decided that the adaptation would be a heist film, and considered a variety of artefacts that could serve as a unique MacGuffin, such as a "cursed diamond from the Smithsonian" and an "ancient Soviet tank with a giant treasure". Kitamura later hired Los Angeles-based journalist Joseph "Joey" O'Bryan – who he described as his "strongest weapon" – to co-write the screenplay with him. O'Bryan and Kitamura wrote three separate drafts, which were compiled by Yamamoto into a complete script. Monkey Punch acted as a creative consultant during scripting. In total, the writing process of Kitamura's film took two-and-a-half years.

According to Kitamura, creative tensions between himself and Yamamoto were high during development; the director noted that the producer/writer "want[ed] to go in all different directions", and considered removing the comedic elements of Lupin III from the film. He also expressed that there was difficulty in having Lupin being clearly defined as the film's protagonist instead of Michael Lee, a character who was created for the film to "drive the story". Kitamura did, however, express that Yamamoto gave him full creative freedom when filming began.

=== Filming ===
Filming began on October 3, 2013, and included scenes shot in Japan, Hong Kong, Singapore, and the Philippines, before moving to Thailand for two months. Principal photography concluded on December 26, 2013.

=== Promotion ===
The film's first promotional images of the cast were released on April 9. The first teaser for the film was released online on April 25, 2014, while the full trailer was uploaded on June 25. The full trailer features the theme song, "Trick Attack -Theme of Lupin the Third", which was written and performed by Tomoyasu Hotei.

== Release ==
Upon release, the film reached second place at the Japanese box office. It then made its International release at LA EigaFest 2014 on September 15, 2015. It was released in Japan on DVD and Blu-ray on February 18, 2015, with a collector's edition. Madman Entertainment released their Blu-ray and DVD of the film in Australia on 24 June 2015 under their Asian film moniker, Eastern Eye. Discotek Media will release their Blu-ray of the film in North America in 2025.

== Reception ==
Critical reception of Lupin the 3rd was generally negative among Japanese and Western film critics, especially following the film's showing at LA EigaFest. Areas frequently targeted for criticism were the film's supporting characters, screenplay, cinematography and editing (especially in the action scenes), costume design and soundtrack. The film was also criticized for having most of its dialogue performed in English (resulting in poor delivery and intonation of numerous lines by its Asian cast members), and for overall squandering its potential as an adaptation of Monkey Punch's manga. Oguri, Tamayama, Ayano, Kuroki and Asano were, however, frequently seen as well-cast in their roles. Opinions from Japanese audiences were mixed, with some viewing Lupin the 3rd as "an enjoyable time to be had to the whole family", while others viewed it as part of a "terrible live-action adaptation trend that has been going on through the years".

Film critic Yuichi Maeda rated the film 3 out of 100 in an online review, writing "The exhibitionism of the movie, 'Isn't this action cool?', 'Isn't this pose cool?', 'This line', 'This costume', 'This (etc)' all feels extremely forced. And more importantly, not one of these things is cool at all. The minute you try to make everything 'cool,' everything becomes cheap instead." Maeda also criticized the film for lacking the franchise's spirit, stating "... Lupin the Third has almost none of the 'Lupin-ishness' found in previous pieces [of the franchise]. If you give a big budget to people without any sense, you end up with an outlandish movie. This is a good example of that".

Writing for Kotaku, Richard Eisenbeis described Lupin the 3rd as "both a Terrible Adaptation and a Horrible Film", criticizing the script's numerous plot holes (namely the absurdity behind the buy/sell auction between Michael and Pramuk, in which a live studio audience becomes a "room full of witnesses for illegal dealings"), Kitamura's "nauseating" direction of the action scenes, and the impractical costumes worn by Lupin, Saber and Maria. He also described the film's soundtrack as "porno music" and disliked the incorporation of Pierre and Joseph as members of Lupin's gang. Eisenbeis concluded his review by describing Lupin the 3rd as "nothing but a schlock action movie; and while 20 years ago it might have been acceptable among the horde of similar films, that boat has long since set sail".

Matt Schley of Otaku USA called the film "a cookie-cutter, movie-by-committee 2+ hour yawner that fails as both as a Kitamura piece and, crucially, a satisfying live-action Lupin the 3rd film", panning the costumes, the characters of Michael Lee (and his role as the film's source of drama and conflict), Pierre and Joseph, the unmemorable music, and the derivative heist film set pieces. Schley also stated that "it's not as if those involved couldn't figure out how to replicate the spirit of Lupin in live action form – it's more like they never even tried".

Paul Bramhall of Cityonfire.com rated the film 3/10, and described it as "a poorly executed retread of the 2012 Korean film The Thieves", noting that Kitamura's film "steals" plot elements and character motivations from Choi Dong-hoon's film more than it does from Monkey Punch's manga. Bramhall criticized the inclusion of Goemon, "for no other reason than he's obviously also from the manga", the convoluted and exposition-heavy storyline, and described the action scenes as "the Hallmark Channel versions of the back seat car fight from The Raid 2, the Donnie Yen vs. Wu Jing fight from Sha Po Lang, and the car chase from The Matrix Reloaded", lamenting that Japan's need for its mainstream films to be shown on television as holiday specials frequently results in derivative and diluted productions.

== Legacy ==
Ryuhei Kitamura has stated in 2014 that a sequel is in development. A spin-off film, Daisuke Jigen, was released on October 13, 2023.

== Bibliography ==
- Lupin the III Movie: Official Book. Kadokawa Shoten. 2014. ISBN 978-4041021408.
