= LA EigaFest =

Film festival in Los Angeles, California

- Location: Los Angeles, California
- Founded: 2011
- Hosted by: Japan Film Society
- Festival date: September
- Language: Japanese/English
- Website: http://www.laeigafest.com/

LA EigaFest, is an annual film festival held in Los Angeles, California hosted by the Japan Film Society. It showcases the latest Japanese films to the American audience. The festival also hosts a Shorts Competition (the Golden Zipangu Awards) and a Business Panel every year. "Eiga" is the Japanese term for "Film."

The festival was founded by festival director Hayato Mitsuishi who is also the Co-Founder and President of the Japan Film Society.

LA EigaFest was first held at the Chinese Theatre in 2011. It was then held at the Egyptian Theatre in 2012, 2013, and 2014 and L.A. LIVE - Regal Cinemas in 2015.

== Film Premieres ==
LA EigaFest has premiered major Japanese films on the big screen in the US that might not have otherwise been seen by US audiences. Many of the films shown have made its International, North America, or US debut at LA Eigafest including such films as Lupin III (International Premiere), Rurouni Kenshin (North American Premiere), Unforgiven (US Premiere), Rurouni Kenshin: Kyoto Inferno (US Premiere), Rurouni Kenshin: The Legend Ends (North American Premiere) and others.
