= Fujiko Mine =

Lupin III character

- Lupin III character
- Fujiko drawn by Monkey Punch
- First appearance: Lupin III chapter 3: "Death Blues", August 24, 1967 (Weekly Manga Action)
- Created by: Monkey Punch
- Portrayed by: Eiko Ezaki (1974) (Note: Strange Psychokinetic Strategy); Meisa Kuroki (2014) (Note: Lupin the 3rd)
- Voiced by (Japanese): Eiko Masuyama (1969–2012); Miyuki Sawashiro (2011–present); Other: Yukiko Nikaido (1971–72) (Note: Lupin the Third Part I); Mami Koyama (1987) (Note: The Fuma Conspiracy); Chisa Yokoyama (1998) (Note: Lupin III D2 Manga)
- Voiced by (English): Michelle Ruff (2002–2007; 2013; 2017–present); Other: Patricia Kobayashi (Frontier Enterprises/Toho International: 1979) (Note: Lupin the 3rd: The Mystery of Mamo); Edie Mirman (Streamline Pictures: 1992–95) (Note: The Castle of Cagliostro, Lupin the Third Part II eps. 145 and 155, The Mystery of Mamo); Michele Seidman (AnimEigo: 1995) (Note: The Fuma Conspiracy); Toni Barry (Manga Entertainment: 1996) (Note: The Mystery of Mamo, Bye Bye, Lady Liberty); Dorothy Elias-Fahn (Animaze/Manga Entertainment: 2000) (Note: The Castle of Cagliostro); Meredith McCoy (Funimation: 2002–06) (Note: The Secret of Twilight Gemini, The Pursuit of Harimao's Treasure, Dragon of Doom, Voyage to Danger, Farewell to Nostradamus, Tokyo Crisis, The Columbus Files, Dead or Alive, Island of Assassins, Missed by a Dollar); Cristina Vee (Bang Zoom! Entertainment/Discotek Media: 2014–26) (Note: Jigen's Gravestone, Goemon's Blood Spray, Fujiko's Lie, Zenigata and the Two Lupins, The Immortal Bloodline)

In-universe information
- Aliases: Margo (Note: Used in Frontier Enterprises/Toho International's dub of The Mystery of Mamo); Rosarie (Note: Used in TMS' subtitled print of The Castle of Cagliostro)
- Nicknames: Japanese; Fujiko-chan; English; Fujicakes
- Occupation: Thief; Spy; Con artist
- Weapon: Browning M1910
- Significant other: Lupin III
- Relatives: Lupin Jr. (son)
- Nationality: Japanese

Fujiko Mine (Japanese: 峰 不二子, Hepburn: Mine Fujiko) is a fictional character created by Monkey Punch for his manga series Lupin III, which debuted in Weekly Manga Action on August 10, 1967. She is a professional criminal and spy who regularly uses her attractiveness to fool her targets. Unlike the rest of the Lupin III cast, Fujiko's physical appearance changes for most installments in the franchise. She is the star of the fourth Lupin III anime television series, 2012's The Woman Called Fujiko Mine, making it the first to not star Lupin III as the protagonist.

Throughout the manga and anime, Fujiko serves as Lupin's on-and-off love interest and rival, with the former exploiting the latter's weakness for women for personal gain. Despite being considered untrustworthy amongst his associates, Lupin nevertheless adores Fujiko and will do anything to impress her. Though later installments tend depict her as being loyal to the gang, her tendency to double cross when necessary remains largely intact.

== Creation ==
As the Lupin III series was made to be published in a magazine targeted at adults, Fujiko Mine was created to add a female presence. Her name is derived from the title "Sacred Mountain Fuji" (霊峰不二, Reihō Fuji). Monkey Punch saw a picture of Mt. Fuji on a calendar and in less than a minute decided on Fujiko Mine, omitting "rei" from "reihō", changing the reading of 峰 to "mine", and adding "ko" to "fuji" to make it look more pleasing when spelled. She was developed from the intention to fulfill a "Bond girl" role. Creating a new female character each week was too difficult for Monkey Punch, so she evolved into a single character. At the beginning of the series, many of the women Lupin encounters are named Fujiko, but are treated as different characters from chapter to chapter.

This concept was later changed to make Fujiko a single character who changes style frequently. Monkey Punch compared the characters of Lupin and Fujiko to those of D'Artagnan and Milady de Winter, and described them as "Not necessarily lovers, not necessarily husband and wife, but more just having fun as man and woman with each other".

== Personality ==
While Fujiko is not officially part of Lupin's gang, she often participates in their exploits either as a partner or a competitor. Her main tactic is to stick with Lupin and company until the plunder is made available, then double-cross her colleagues. Frequently, as the very definition of a femme fatale, she finds it necessary to betray Lupin to get close to the enemy, then after ingratiating herself into his trust will acquire the swag and escape (rarely, she will help to extricate Lupin, Goemon and Jigen from capture or any deadly trouble she put them into, as if to atone). Fujiko is also known to provide law enforcement (particularly Lupin's nemesis Inspector Zenigata) with information and assistance in order to gain her own freedom. At one point, Fujiko was made Zenigata's replacement on the ICPO's Lupin operation, but this was a cover for her to get into a secret vault.

Lupin is surprisingly forgiving of her two-faced nature. In the 1999 television movie The Columbus Files, Lupin carefully treats the amnesiatic Fujiko, hoping she gets better as he "looks forward to her betrayals".

Fujiko is an excellent markswoman, her favorite weapon being a Browning M1910, typically holstered in her garter. Later, she's revealed superb martial arts skills, capable of rendering an attacker twice her weight unconscious with a single blow. She is very good at disguises as well as accents and apparently can speak dozens of foreign languages in addition to her native Japanese. Like the other members of Lupin's team, she is able to pilot virtually any land, sea, and air vehicle, with her personal preference being a conventional Kawasaki motorcycle. She can be very promiscuous when necessary to complete a job, and has kissed and even had sex with different men for information or to escape a dangerous situation. The 2012 anime series implies heavily that Fujiko is bisexual or is willing to feign such behavior to get what she wants.

Daisuke Jigen despises Fujiko and sees her showing up as a sign of rough times ahead, although despite this, in the original manga he was still one of her suitors. For Lupin's sake, he will come to Fujiko's defense in desperate moments, and at best he views her as an annoying sister. Goemon Ishikawa XIII, who had a brief romance with Ms. Mine, has been known to work on capers with Fujiko independent of the other gang members, but can be equally distrustful of her when he thinks she is manipulating Lupin. Still, in the Lupin the 3rd Part II anime Jigen and Goemon are seen working together numerous times with Fujiko, trusting their lives on her, and vice versa, with them having a sibling rivalry of sorts. In the anime, Fujiko also displays at times a more frivolous and care-free personality, which sees her pranking Lupin whenever she can.

Lupin is completely infatuated with Fujiko, and will do anything for her. While Fujiko is aware of this and always uses it to her advantage, she never gets Lupin into trouble where he cannot escape. Monkey Punch has said that the two "enjoy each other", and are quite content with their bizarre yet amicable relationship, comparing it to his own marriage.

Although she is more willing to contain her feelings, Fujiko does have a love for Lupin. She rarely wishes to fully reveal her affection except if she thinks one or both are dying. On occasions where Lupin appears to have died, she grieves and considers him the most important person to her. However, her not-altogether-hidden feelings submerge again when she finds him alive.

Fujiko usually dresses in the height of fashion, with formal gowns and fine jewelry her trademark; when informal, she typically wears outfits that accentuate her robust figure. Fujiko's favorite pastimes appear to be shopping, attending social functions, disco dancing, horseback riding, and dating wealthy gentlemen. She enjoys champagne, fine wine and has been seen more than once consuming a martini; she also smokes cigarettes and occasionally uses a kiseru.

== Background ==
Fujiko as seen in Alcatraz Connection

Fujiko made her first appearance in the third chapter of the original manga, "Death Blues" (死んでゆくブルース, Shinde Yuku Burūsu), with her creation predating those of Jigen and Goemon. She initially appears as a con woman attempting to worm her way into the fortune of a rich family, whose heir has hired Lupin as security. Immediately upon arriving, she recognizes Lupin through his disguise, and by the end of the arc, Lupin has sided with her to rob the entire family.

Due to the episodic nature of the manga, many of Fujiko's appearances treat her and Lupin as meeting for the first time, even after the incident where Lupin kills her father. Many of the stories feature her trying to capture the same object as Lupin.

Fujiko's background includes organized crime in partnership with the notorious killer known as Pun. The couple was famous for carrying out contract killings without failure. However, the partnership ended abruptly when Pun's employer ordered him to kill Fujiko after she made a mistake. Pun could not face being asked to kill Fujiko and she disappeared. Fujiko claims to suffer from amnesia and cannot remember anything prior those events.

== Actresses ==
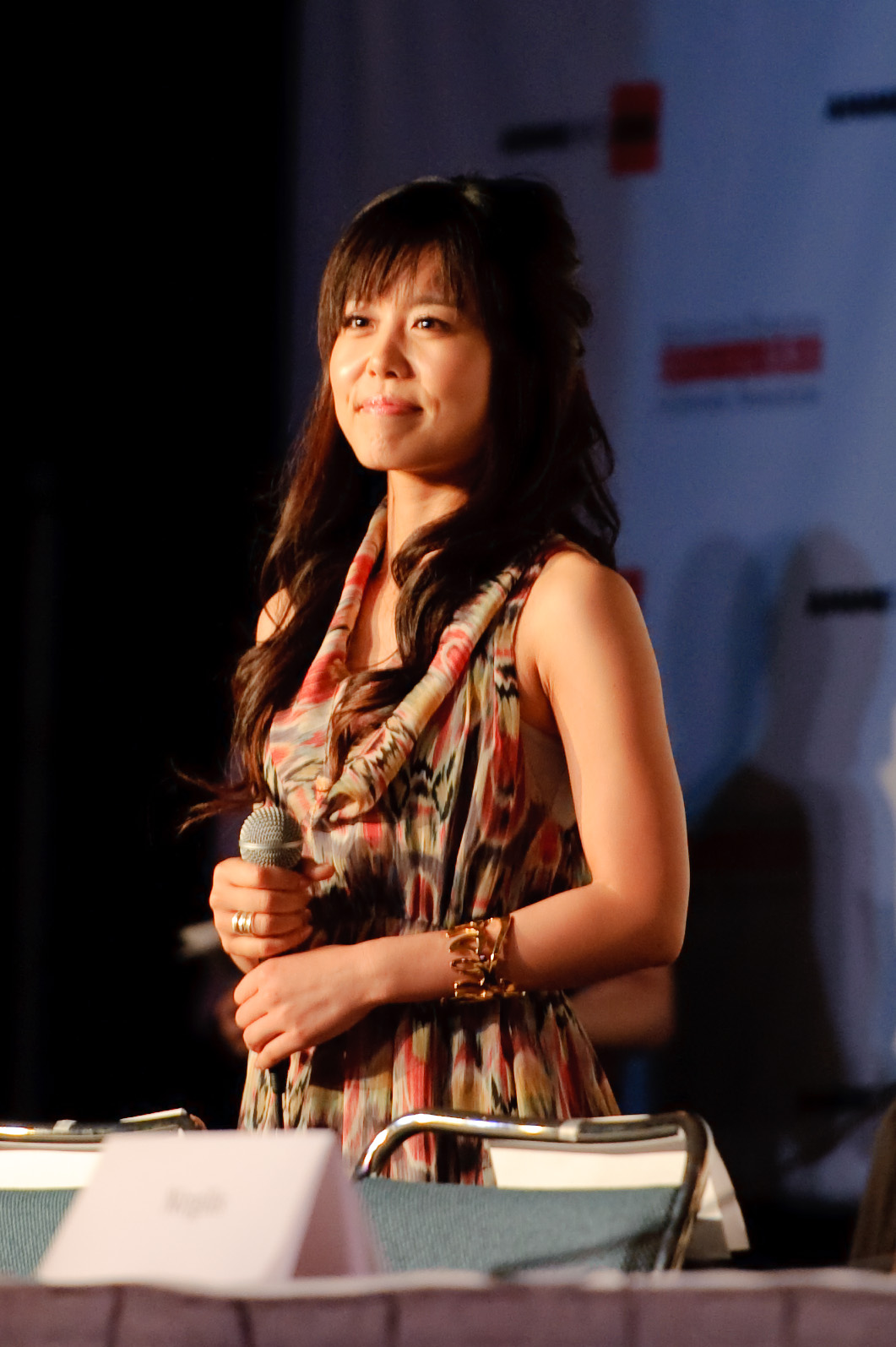
Miyuki Sawashiro has been Fujiko's voice actress since 2011.

Fujiko Mine was first voiced by Eiko Masuyama in both versions of the 1969 pilot film for the first anime. Although Yukiko Nikaido was given the role when the first anime was actually produced (1971–72), Masuyama would return to voice Fujiko for the second anime (1977–78) and continue to do so until her retirement in 2010, with one exception. Due to budget concerns, TMS decided not to employ the regular voice cast for the 1987 original video animation The Fuma Conspiracy, with Fujiko voiced by Mami Koyama. The 2011 TV special Blood Seal of the Eternal Mermaid marked the first appearance of Miyuki Sawashiro as the character and she continues to voice Fujiko Mine to this day. Masuyama did return to the role once more for the 2012 Lupin Family Lineup short original video animation.

Due to a lack of localization credits on any known prints, Fujiko's English voice actress in the 1979 Toho dub of The Mystery of Mamo, where the character's name was changed to "Margo", remains unknown. Other voice actors include Edie Mirman (1992-5, Streamline), Michele Seidman (1995, AnimEigo). Toni Barry (1996, Manga UK), and Dorothy Fahn (2000, Animaze/Manga). Meredith McCoy voiced the character for Funimation Entertainment's dubs of several TV specials and theatrical films between 2002 and 2005.

Michelle Ruff voiced Fujiko in the Phuuz dub for Pioneer/Geneon's release of the second anime between 2003 and 2006, before reprising the role for Funimation's 2013 dub of The Woman Called Fujiko Mine, and Discotek Media's dubs of the fifth, sixth anime and seventh anime. Cristina Vee voiced Fujiko in the Bang Zoom! Entertainment dub for Discotek's 2015 release of the Jigen's Gravestone film, and reprised her role for their 2018 dub of Goemon Ishikawa's Spray of Blood and 2020 dub of Fujiko Mine's Lie.

In the realm of live-action, Fujiko is portrayed by Eiko Ezaki in the 1974 film and by Meisa Kuroki in the 2014 film. In the 2015 musical adaptation of Lupin III performed by the Takarazuka Revue, Fujiko was portrayed by Seshiro Daigo.

== Reception ==
=== Popularity ===
In 2007, Oricon polled readers on which characters they would most like to see in their own series. Fujiko Mine appeared in the seventh position among female voters, and fifth place overall. The company also asked their readers in the very same year who they believed is the most beautiful woman in manga. Fujiko was crowned the title by scoring first place overall with high rankings from both male and female voters. She was listed as the second most iconic anime heroine by Mania.com. In 2012, in a Japanese poll on which character's voice actor should never change, Fujiko came in second among males and third amongst females. In 2013, eBookJapan polled its female customers in their 20s and 30s on which manga heroine they felt had the ideal body. In the poll that considered their sexiness, physical fitness and health, Fujiko Mine was the first place answer. A 2015 Charapedia poll, which asked fans to list their favourite "cool" women in anime, had Fujiko placed seventeenth. In a 2017 survey that polled 12,000 Japanese, Fujiko Mine was voted the Most Splendid Heroine of the Shōwa Era and the third most of the Heisei Era. Fujiko was voted the sexiest anime heroine in a 2020 Goo poll of about 4,000 people.

=== Critical reception ===
Dallas Marshall of THEM Anime Reviews called Fujiko one of the most iconic female characters in anime history and referred to her as "the sexy glue that keeps Lupin and his merry band of misfits together." Crunchyroll's Chad Landon Smith wrote that "mysterious" is Fujiko's defining character trait and that being "born of the femme fatale stereotype, her intentions and motivations are never meant to be clear." Rob Lineberger of DVD Verdict described Fujiko as "The 70's answer to Lara Croft".

In his review of the first anime, Chris Beveridge of The Fandom Post enjoyed that while Fujiko has a bit of a "sexpot feel about her here, she's the one that's the most conniving here and does it all with a wicked grin and a smile."

Anime News Network's Mike Crandol reviewing the second anime felt that while Fujiko's main function is "eye candy in the best Bond tradition," her "double-crossing nature keeps Lupin and company on their toes and the plot-twists twice as much fun."

Reviewing The Woman Called Fujiko Mine, Jacob Hope Chapman of Anime News Network wrote that Fujiko never has an answer for what she does, "but is always overjoyed to continue that life, making her fun to watch, but also an intriguing mystery to be solved." He also stated that "surprisingly, Fujiko's constant objectification culminates in one of the most feminist-positive anime to come around in years."

Of Meisa Kuroki's performance in the 2014 live-action film, Matt Schley of Otaku USA commented that the actress comes as close to Fujiko "as any real human female can, I suppose."

=== Legacy ===
A manga called Lupin Kozō (ルパン小僧) starring Fujiko and Lupin's son ran in Weekly Shōnen Action for 18 chapters starting in 1975. A spinoff manga of Lupin III, titled M.F.C (Mine Fujiko Company) (M.F.C 女泥棒会社峰不二子カンパニー), follows three young female thieves who work for Fujiko. It was written by Suzuki Izo and published in two volumes on September 28, 2009.

Fujiko was a source of inspiration for the characters Yukiko Fujimine and Vermouth in Gosho Aoyama's Detective Conan manga; Fujimine representing the good side of Fujiko and Vermouth the bad. The former's name is a combination of Fujiko Mine and the first name of Fujiko's former voice actress Yukiko Nikaido. In the manga and anime Azumanga Daioh by Kiyohiko Azuma, Tomo Takino is a fan of the Lupin III series and admires Fujiko. She constantly makes references to herself as Fujiko Mine, despite the fact the two are totally different in looks and personality. In the Aria the Scarlet Ammo light novel series, the character Riko Mine Lupin IV is the daughter of Lupin and Fujiko.
