= Monkey Punch =

Japanese manga artist (1937–2019)

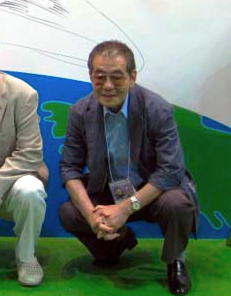
- Monkey Punch in 2009
- Born: Kazuhiko Katō (加藤一彦); May 26, 1937; Hamanaka, Hokkaido, Japan
- Died: April 11, 2019 (aged 81); Sakura, Chiba, Japan
- Other names: Monkey Punch; Eiji Gamuta
- Occupations: Manga artist; writer; professor
- Years active: 1962–2019
- Notable work: Lupin III
- Awards: Inkpot Award (1981)
- Website: monkeypunch.com

Kazuhiko Katō (Japanese: 加藤一彦, Hepburn: Katō Kazuhiko; May 26, 1937 – April 11, 2019), known by the pen name Monkey Punch (モンキー・パンチ, Monkī Panchi), was a Japanese manga artist, best known for his series Lupin III.

== Life and career ==
Katō was born in Hamanaka, Hokkaido; he began drawing at a very young age, but did not draw manga until junior high school, when his manga strips were used in the school newspaper. After graduating, he moved to Tokyo to look for work and began going to a technical school for electronics, continuing to draw for fun. While working in a dōjinshi group with other artists, he was recruited by Futabasha and drew yonkoma. He was an assistant to Naoki Tsuji on Zero-sen Hayato and Tiger Mask.

Lupin III made its debut on August 10, 1967, in the first issue of the magazine Weekly Manga Action; the cover was also drawn by Monkey Punch. It went on to become an extremely popular and successful media franchise, spawning numerous manga, six animated television series, seven animated feature films, two live-action films, three OVAs, near-yearly television specials since 1989, music CDs, video games, and a musical. Monkey Punch himself even directed the 1996 film, Dead or Alive.

In April 2005, he became the professor of Manga and Animation at Otemae University, in its Faculty of Media and Arts, and was a visiting professor at Tokyo University of Technology in May 2010.

On April 21, 2007, Monkey Punch participated in a series of lectures on the "interaction of manga and culture throughout the world" at the Freer Gallery of Art. In 2008, Monkey Punch was a judge at the Japanese Ministry of Foreign Affairs' Second International Manga Awards.

He designed the characters for the pachinko game CR Ginroku Gijinden Roman in 2012. The following year an anime adaptation of the game began airing on January 7, 2013, with Monkey Punch's designs adapted by Satoshi Hirayama, and was streamed with English subtitles on Crunchyroll.

Monkey Punch participated in the writing of the 2014 live-action film adaptation of Lupin III.

== Personal life and death ==
Monkey Punch resided in Sakura, Chiba, until his death. He died on April 11, 2019, due to pneumonia.

== Pen name ==
Katō first started to work as a professional manga artist, under the pen name Kazuhiko Katō (加東一彦, Katō Kazuhiko; pronounced the same as his real name, but written with different characters). In 1965, he made his debut with Playboy School, writing under the name of Eiji Gamuta (がむた永二, Gamuta Eiji). The editor of the magazine that "discovered him" then suggested the pen name Monkey Punch. Katō claims that he did not like the name, but agreed because it was his boss's idea and his next series was only supposed to be a three-month project. When the series, Lupin III, became popular, he was stuck with the name.

Katō's younger brother, Teruhiko (輝彦), worked as his assistant on Lupin III. For years it was widely believed that the pen name Monkey Punch referred to the two brothers working together as a creative duo, but in a 2017 interview they clarified that this idea stemmed from a mistaken magazine article, and that the name Monkey Punch should be understood to refer exclusively to the older brother Kazuhiko, who did all of the main creative work concerning the characters, story, and the main drawings. The younger brother Teruhiko explained that he was exclusively doing assistant work.

Katō's pen name is the namesake for Punch-kun, a Japanese macaque at the Ichikawa City Zoo who became an internet celebrity in early 2026.

== Style ==
Monkey Punch has stated that Osamu Tezuka was the reason he wanted to become a manga artist. He acknowledged the influence Mad magazine artist Mort Drucker had on his work.

== Awards ==
He received the Inkpot Award in 1981 and a special Tokyo Anime Award in 2015.

== List of works ==
=== 1960s ===
- 1962
  - Number 5 + α
  - Gun Hustler
  - Rebellious Child
  - List the Criminal
  - Open Homicide
  - Clandestine Work
  - The Man Who Does Not Have a Shadow
  - The Person Whom It Uses
  - Vengeance (Fukushu) as Kazuhiko Katō
  - Ghost Story Guy as Kazuhiko Katō
- 1965
  - Playboy School (プレーボーイ入門, Purēbōi Nyūmon) as Eiji Gamuta
  - Needless Axle of Wilderness
  - Pink Guard Man ... Blues of the Assassin (Pinku Gado Man ... Hissatsu no Burusu)
  - Outsider (Autosaida Monkey Punch)
- 1967
  - The Ginza Whirlwind Child (Ginza Senpuji)
  - Lupin III (ルパン三世, Rupan Sansei)
- 1968
  - Western Samurai (Uesutan Samurai)
- 1969
  - Pandora

=== 1970s ===
- 1970
  - Spy Nobility (Supai Shinzoku)
  - Document Mania (Dokyumento Kyo)
  - Lupin III Other Stories (ルパン三世外伝, Rupan Sansei Gaiden)
  - Tac Tics
- 1971
  - Multi (Maruchi)
  - Mysterious Jaguarman (Kaijin Jagaman)
  - New Adventures of Lupin III (ルパン三世・新冒険, Rupan Sansei Shin Bōken)
- 1972
  - The Siamese Cat (シャム猫, Shamu Neko)
  - Makao
  - Monsieur Koga
  - Key
- 1973
  - Sufficiently Motivated (Yaruki Jubun)
  - Decoy House Slug (Kikuya Namekuji)
  - Venus of Diamond (Daia no Binasu)
- 1974
  - I Am Casanova (Ore wa Kazanoba)
  - Color Girl (Kara Garu)
  - Isshuku Ippan (一宿一飯)
  - Lupin the Kid (ルパン小僧, Rupan Kozō)
- 1976
  - Little Dracula (Dorakyura-kun)
  - Up-Up Balloon (UP-UP Barun)
- 1977
  - New Lupin III (新ルパン三世, Shin Rupan Sansei; known in North America as Lupin III – World's Most Wanted)
  - The Reverse Aesop's Fables (逆イソップ物語, Gyaku Isoppu Monogatari)
  - Transparent Gentleman (Tomei Shinshi)
- 1978
  - Time Agent (Jikan Ejento)
  - Kaiketsu Zero

=== 1980s ===
- 1980
  - Cinderella Boy (シンデレラボーイ, Shinderera Boi)
  - Boy
  - Botchan (anime, character design)
- 1981
  - Hauler Holmes (ホームズ, Hōmuzu)
- 1982
  - Space Adventure Team Mechabunger (Uchū Bōken-tai Mekabanja)
  - Another work from Cinderella Boy.
- 1983
  - Roller Boy (Rora Boi)
  - Lucky Monkey (Raki Monki)
- 1984
  - Sexy Lupin III (SEXYルパン・3, SEXY Rupan・3)
  - The English Conversation Maneuvers of Lupin III (ルパン三世の英会話作戦, Rupan Sansei no Ei-Kaiwa Sakusen)
- 1986
  - Pinky Punky (ピンキィ パンキィ, Pinkī Pankī)
  - Dirty Joke (ダアティ ジョオク, Dāti Jōku)
  - Robot Baseball Team Galacters (ろぼっと球団ガラクターズ/おまかせスクラッパーズ, Robotto Kyudan Garakutāzu)

=== 1990s ===
- 1991
  - Monkey Punch no Sekai: Alice (December 13)
  - Scramble Saver Kids
- 1994
  - Omakase Scrappers (おまかせ スクラッパーズ)
- 1996
  - Lupin III: Dead or Alive
- 1997
  - One Thousand and One Nights' Story (Senya Ichiya Monogatari)
  - Mankatsu (漫画活動大写真)
  - Musashi -Way of the Gun- (MUSASHI -GUN道-, Musashi -Gandō-)

=== 2000s ===
- 2004
  - Mankatsu (anime)

=== 2010s ===
- 2013
  - Bakumatsu Gijinden Roman (幕末義人伝 浪漫; original character designs)
