= Lupin the 3rd: Goodbye Partner =

2019 television film directed by Jun Kawagoe

- Promotional poster

ルパン三世 グッバイ・パートナー (Rupan Sansei Gubbai Pātonā)
- Created by: Monkey Punch
- Anime television film
- Directed by: Jun Kawagoe
- Written by: Takehiko Hata
- Music by: Yuji Ohno
- Studio: TMS Entertainment
- Licensed by: NA: Discotek Media
- Original network: NNS (Nippon TV)
- Released: January 25, 2019
- Runtime: 114 minutes

Lupin the 3rd: Goodbye Partner (ルパン三世 グッバイ・パートナー, Rupan Sansei Gubbai Pātonā) is a Japanese anime television special produced by TMS Entertainment, serving as the twenty-sixth television special in the Lupin the 3rd franchise, itself based on the manga series of the same name by Monkey Punch. The special was directed by Jun Kawagoe from a screenplay by Takehiko Hata and aired on Nippon Television on January 25, 2019, as part of the network's Kinyo Roadshow. This was the last Heisei-era Lupin the 3rd special, released four months before the 2019 Japanese imperial transition and was the last Lupin the 3rd special to be released during Monkey Punch's lifetime as he would pass away on April 11, three months after the special's debut.

== Plot ==
During a typical attempt to capture Lupin, Inspector Zenigata is unexpectedly arrested on suspicion of helping Lupin commit his crimes. Lupin is annoyed to learn Zenigata is being pinned as the true mastermind behind all his heists, so to prove they are not colluding, he is manipulated into agreeing to steal a special diamond called the Time Crystal, which is also the key to control a quantum supercomputer.

Lupin successfully steals the diamond, but he is betrayed by Jigen, who shoots him and steals the gem. Meanwhile, Alisa Cartwright, a promising young entrant in the Chopin Competition, is kidnapped in London by the very wealthy and ambitious Roy Forest. Jigen delivers the crystal to Forest so he can operate his quantum supercomputer, but they discover it is a fake. Jigen reluctantly agrees to confront Lupin, as Alisa is the daughter of one of his ex's, potentially his daughter.

Lupin and Goemon break Zenigata out of jail to help them catch Jigen, and they track him to Forest's headquarters. Forest forces Lupin to deliver the original crystal or he will kill Alisa. She is then forced to play Chopin's music on his original piano, which activates the crystal and Forest takes control of the world's financial systems. However, Lupin discovers the musical key to taking control of the supercomputer and thwarts Forest's plan for world domination.

The A.I. within the supercomputer suddenly goes rogue and begins warring with the American government, who are attempting to rid all trace of their involvement with the computer and Forest. Alisa and Fujiko play piano to distract it while Lupin and Jigen blow it up from the outside. With the threat eliminated, the crew goes their separate ways as Fujiko takes Alisa to her competition, while Jigen kills Forest.

== Voice cast ==
Character	Japanese voice actor	English voice actor
Lupin the 3rd	Kanichi Kurita	Tony Oliver
Jigen Daisuke	Kiyoshi Kobayashi	Richard Epcar
Goemon Ishikawa	Daisuke Namikawa	Lex Lang
Fujiko Mine	Miyuki Sawashiro	Michelle Ruff
Inspector Zenigata	Koichi Yamadera	Doug Erholtz
Roy Forest	Junichi Suwabe	Armen Taylor
Alisa	Minako Kotobuki	Ryan Bartley
Norman	Tsuyoshi Koyama	Chris Tergliafera
Emilka	Risa Uchida	Lizzie Freeman
Kato	Yoji Ueda	Mark Whitten

== Production ==
The special was announced on December 21, 2018. The special is an original story, the first in nearly six years with the crew also being revealed around the same time. The special's guest cast was revealed on December 27 of that year.
