= Lupin the 3rd Part II =

Japanese anime television series

- DVD box art, released by VAP
- ルパン三世
- Based on: Lupin the 3rd by Monkey Punch
- Developed by: Atsushi Yamatoya (#53–155)
- Music by: Yuji Ohno
- Country of origin: Japan
- Original language: Japanese
- No. of episodes: 155 (list of episodes)

Production
- Producers: Seiji Takahashi (NTV); Yoshimitsu Takahashi (TMS)
- Production company: Tokyo Movie Shinsha

Original release
- Network: NNS (NTV)
- Release: October 3, 1977 – October 6, 1980

Lupin the 3rd Part II is a Japanese anime television series produced by Tokyo Movie Shinsha. Part of the Lupin III franchise, it is the second anime television adaptation of the Lupin III manga series created by Monkey Punch. Although originally broadcast as simply Lupin III (Japanese: ルパン三世, Hepburn: Rupan Sansei), the series is now often referred to as New Lupin III (新 ルパン三世, Shin Rupan Sansei) by Japanese fans. Among English-speaking fans, the series is commonly known as the "Red Jacket" series in reference to Lupin's outfit.

The series contains 155 episodes, which aired between October 3, 1977, and October 6, 1980, on the Japanese television network Nippon Television. Streamline Pictures released episodes 145 and 155 in the United States to VHS in 1994 as Lupin III: Tales of the Wolf, which was re-released by Orion Home Video as Lupin III's Greatest Capers the following year. In 2003, Pioneer Entertainment licensed and released 79 episodes in North America, 26 of which were broadcast on Adult Swim. The series was picked up by Discotek Media, who released all 155 episodes to DVD between 2017 and 2020.

== Story ==
The series, based on the Lupin III manga written by Monkey Punch beginning in 1967, centers on the adventures of Lupin III, the grandson of Arsène Lupin, the gentleman thief of Maurice Leblanc's series of novels. He is joined by Daisuke Jigen, crack-shot and Lupin's closest ally; Fujiko Mine, the femme fatale and Lupin's love interest who works against Lupin more often than with him; and Goemon Ishikawa XIII, a master swordsman and the descendant of Ishikawa Goemon, the legendary Japanese bandit. Lupin is often chased by Inspector Zenigata, the dogged detective who has made it his life mission to catch Lupin.

== Production ==
After Lupin the Third Part I became popular during reruns, a new series was created. In contrast to the dark tone and violence of the more serious first series, this series made use of a lighter tone and more exaggerated animation to create a crime caper. Pop culture references appear frequently.

The music for the series was composed by Yuji Ohno.

Episodes 145 and 155 were written and directed by Hayao Miyazaki under the pseudonym "Terekomu" and they marked his final involvement with the Lupin franchise. Elements from these episodes would be reused in his films Nausicaä of the Valley of the Wind, Laputa: Castle in the Sky, and Porco Rosso.

== Cast ==
Character	Japanese	English	
Character	Japanese	Streamline (1994)	Phuuz/Pioneer/Geneon (2003–2007)
Lupin III	Yasuo Yamada	Wolf	Tony Oliver
Lupin III	Yasuo Yamada	Bob Bergen	Tony Oliver
Daisuke Jigen	Kiyoshi Kobayashi	Steve Bulen	Richard Epcar
Fujiko Mine	Eiko Masuyama	Edie Mirman	Michelle Ruff
Goemon Ishikawa	Makio Inoue	Steve Kramer	Lex Lang
Inspector Zenigata	Gorō Naya	David Povall	Dan Lorge

Bob Bergen intended to reprise his role as Lupin in the Pioneer/Geneon dub, but chose not to because the dub was a non-union project.

== Release ==
The series was broadcast on Nippon TV from October 3, 1977, to October 6, 1980. Episode 99 was the first anime episode to ever be broadcast in Stereo Sound.

The series was released on Blu-ray by VAP as individual discs as well as several boxsets. Six boxsets were released between February 25 and December 23, 2009. Twenty-Six individual discs were released between March 25, 2009, and January 27, 2010. Kodansha launched Lupin III DVD Collection, a bi-weekly magazine on January 27, 2015. Scheduled to run for 45 issues, the magazine includes a DVD containing episodes from the first two Lupin III TV series.

The first American release of the series was handled by Streamline Pictures, which distributed English language dubs of episodes 145 and 155 individually to VHS in 1994 as Lupin III: Tales of the Wolf. Orion Home Video distributed the episodes together as Lupin III's Greatest Capers in 1995.

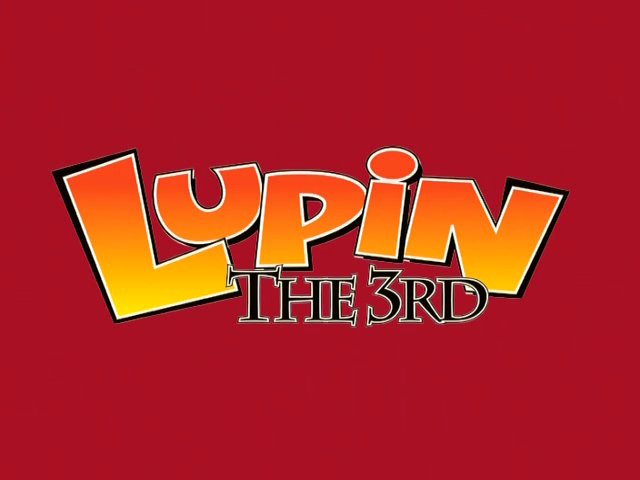
Title card used in Pioneer Entertainment's English release

The series was licensed by Pioneer Entertainment/Geneon for North America. Due to some licensing issues regarding trademarked logos and musical elements, Pioneer were provided with altered masters by the licensor. An English dub was created by Phuuz Entertainment and given a "modern feel" alongside a subtitle script that is more faithful to the original dialog. The storylines are unaffected by these changes. Due to potential controversy concerning an episode regarding Adolf Hitler, the episode that was originally broadcast third in Japan was delayed until later in the series. Fifteen volumes of the series containing a total of 79 episodes were released on DVD between January 28, 2003, to July 4, 2006. Episodes 1–27, omitting the Hitler episode, were broadcast on Adult Swim from January 14, 2003. Richard Epcar, the director of the English dub and voice of Jigen, revealed via Twitter that Geneon lost the license to the series before they could dub the rest of the series in English.

In 2009, the Southern California-based United Television Broadcasting network began airing subtitled episodes from the series on their UTBHollywood channel. The full series is available to watch on Crunchyroll in Japanese and the Pioneer/Geneon English dub; the Streamline English dub is not included.

On December 20, 2015, Discotek Media announced their acquisition of the North American distribution rights to the entire second series. Released in four DVD sets, the releases included "any English dubs that already exist" and newly produced subtitles for episodes 80 to 155. The first set included the first 40 episodes and was released on January 10, 2017. The second set included episodes 41 through 79 and an interview with Richard Epcar and was released on December 26, 2017. Set three with episodes 80 through 117 was released on January 29, 2019. The fourth and final set was released on January 28, 2020, and included the Streamline English dub of episodes 145 and 155.

On August 1, 2026, Discotek Media announced a complete Blu-ray release of the second series containing all 155 episodes that will release in October.

== Reception ==
The final episode of the series received a viewing share of 32.5% in the Kantō region during its original broadcast on December 8, 1978. Due to this the series was ranked sixth on Video Research's list of anime series ranked by their highest rated episode in December 2015.

The series has attained a favourable response in the West. Rob Lineberger of DVD Verdict drew comparisons of the series to western works. He compared the flyovers of major cities and villains planning world domination to James Bond, the teamwork and "campiness" to Charlie's Angels and the "Zany humour" and disguises to Scooby-Doo but added that the series has "its own fun flavour". He expressed mixed views over the English dub and its attempt to modernise the series, understanding the negative reaction to it. However he personally enjoyed the dub. Chris Beveridge of Mania.com and Mike Crandol of ANN disliked the dub of the series because Pioneer Entertainment used many modern references and updated dialogue for a series that was released in the late 1970s, although the series itself received a positive overall review from both reviewers.
