= List of Lupin the Third video games =

This is a list of video games of the Japanese media franchise Lupin the Third based on the manga written by Monkey Punch beginning in 1967.

Several Lupin III video games have been created. The first was a stealth game released to arcades in Japan by Taito in 1980 as Lupin III. A Laserdisc video game entitled Cliff Hanger was released to arcades in North America in 1983 by Stern. While it uses footage from The Mystery of Mamo and The Castle of Cagliostro to provide a gaming experience similar to Dragon's Lair, it changes the characters' names and has an original plot. Epoch Co. released a second game called Lupin III for the Epoch Super Cassette Vision in Japan in 1984. Also in 1984, Lupin III: Legacy of Pandora was released for the Family Computer. This game featured Clarisse from Castle of Cagliostro. Two games were released for the MSX platform, both based on anime movies: Lupin III: The Castle of Cagliostro in 1987, and Lupin III: Legend of the Gold of Babylon in 1988. Lupin the 3rd: Hunt for the Legendary Treasure! was released for the Super Famicom on December 27, 1994. Sega released two games developed by WOW Entertainment for the Sega Naomi arcade system: Lupin III The Shooting, a light gun game, in 2001, and Lupin III The Typing, a typing game, in 2002. Bandai released Lupin the 3rd: Treasure of the Sorcerer King in Japan for the PlayStation 2 on November 8, 2002. This stealth game was later released in North America on February 10, 2004. Lupin is Dead, Zenigata is in Love, a stealth game developed by Banpresto for the PlayStation 2, was released in Japan on February 22, 2007, and in Italy in 2008. In 2010, Lupin III: Shijō Saidai no Zunōsen was released for the Nintendo DS.

Title	Platform	Publisher	Genre	Release date
Lupin the 3rd Rupan Sansei (ルパン三世)	Arcade	Taito	Stealth game	April 1980
Cliff Hanger	Arcade	Stern, TMS Entertainment	Interactive movie	1983
Lupin the 3rd Rupan Sansei (ルパン三世)	Epoch Super Cassette Vision	Epoch Co.	Platform game	1984
Lupin the 3rd: The Castle of Cagliostro (ルパン三世カリオストロの城, Rupan Sansei: Cagliostro no Shiro)	Computer: FM-7, PC-8801, Sharp X1	Toho	Adventure game	1985
Lupin the 3rd: Pandora's Legacy (ルパン三世 バンドラの遺産, Rupan Sansei: Pandora no Isan)	Famicom	Namco	Platform game	November 6, 1987
Lupin the 3rd: The Castle of Cagliostro (ルパン三世カリオストロの城, Rupan Sansei: Cagliostro no Shiro)	MSX (Port)	Toho	Adventure game	1987
Lupin the 3rd: Legend of the Gold of Babylon (ルパン三世 バビロンの黄金伝説, Rupan Sansei: Babylon no Ogon Densetsu)	MSX, PC-8801	Toho	Adventure game	1988
Super Deformer Lupin the 3rd: Operation to Break the Safe (SDルパン三世：金庫破り大作戦, SD Rupan Sansei: Kinko Yaburi Daisakusen)	Game Boy	Banpresto	Puzzle	April 13, 1990/1989
Lupin the 3rd: The Devil Hands of Hong Kong (ルパン三世-香港の魔手 復讐は迷宮の果てに, Rupan Sansei: Hong Kong no Mashu - Fukushū wa Meikyū no Hate ni)	FM Towns	CSK	Adventure	1990
Lupin the 3rd: Hunt for the Legendary Treasure! (ルパン三世 伝説の秘宝を追え!, Rupan Sansei: Densetsu no Hihou o Oe!)	Super Famicom	Epoch Co.	Platform game	December 26, 1994
Lupin the 3rd: The Master File (ルパン三世 ザ・マスター・ファイル)	Sega Saturn	Mizuki	Interactive movie	March 29, 1996
Lupin the Third, The Castle of Cagliostro: Reunion (Rupan Sansei: Cagliostro no Shiro Saikai)	PlayStation	Asmik Ace Entertainment	Interactive movie	January 10, 1997
Lupin the 3rd: Chronicles (ルパン三世 クロニクル)	Sega Saturn	Spike	Interactive movie	August 8, 1997
Lupin the 3rd: The Sage of the Pyramid (ルパン三世 ピラミッドの賢者, Rupan Sansei: Pyramid no Kenja)	Sega Saturn	Asmik Ace Entertainment	Platform game	August 6, 1998
Lupin the 3rd (ルパン三世, Rupan Sansei)	PlayStation	Daiki	Interactive movie	November 26, 1998
Punch The Monkey game edition	PlayStation	KAZe	Music	June 22, 2000
Lupin The Third: The Shooting (ルパン三世: THE SHOOTING, Rupan Sansei: THE SHOOTING)	Sega Naomi (Arcade)	Sega	Light gun	December 2001
Lupin The Third: The Typing (ルパン三世: THE TYPING, Rupan Sansei: THE TYPING)	Sega Naomi (Arcade)	Sega	Typing	April 2002
Lupin the 3rd: Treasure of the Sorcerer King (ルパン三世 魔術王の遺産, Rupan Sansei: Majutsu-Ou no Isan (Legacy of the Magic King)	PlayStation 2	Bandai	Stealth game	November 28, 2002
Lupin the 3rd: Lost Treasure by the Sea (ルパン三世 海に消えた秘宝, Rupan Sansei: Umi ni Kieta Hihou)	GameCube	Asmik Ace Entertainment	Action	July 31, 2003
Lupin the 3rd: The Legacy of Columbus's Inheritance (ルパン三世 コロンブスの遺産は朱に染まる, Rupan Sansei: Columbus no Isan wa Akenisomaru)	PlayStation 2	Banpresto	Action	November 25, 2004
Slotter Up Core 5: I Love Lupin! Zenikage is the Star (スロッターUP5 ルパン大好き！主役は銭形, Slotter Up Core 5: Lupin Daisuki! Shuyaku ha Zenikage)	PlayStation 2	Dorart	Slot machine	November 25, 2004
Lupin the Third: Lupin Is Dead, Zenigata Is in Love (ルパン三世 ルパンには死を、銭形には恋を, Rupan Sansei - Rupan ni wa shi o, Zenigata ni wa koi o)	PlayStation 2	Banpresto	Stealth game	February 22, 2007
Lupin the Third: The Greatest Brain Battle in History (ルパン三世 史上最大の頭脳戦, Rupan Sansei: Shijō Saidai no Zunōsen)	Nintendo DS	Namco Bandai Games	Action puzzle	February 11, 2010
