= Episode 0: The First Contact =

2002 14th Lupin III television special directed by Ōhara Shōjitsu

- Lupin the 3rd Episode 0: First Contact
- DVD cover

ルパン三世 EPISODE:0 ファーストコンタクト (Rupan Sansei Episōdo Zero Faasuto Kontakuto)
- Created by: Monkey Punch
- Anime television film
- Directed by: Minoru Ōhara
- Produced by: Hiromichi Ohishi; Keiko Konori; Yasumichi Ozaki
- Written by: Shōji Yonemura; Osamu Dezaki
- Music by: Yuji Ohno
- Studio: TMS Entertainment
- Licensed by: NA: Discotek Media
- Original network: NNS (NTV)
- Released: July 26, 2002
- Runtime: 92 minutes

Lupin the 3rd Episode 0: The First Contact (ルパン三世 EPISODE:0 ファーストコンタクト, Rupan Sansei Episōdo Zero Faasuto Kontakuto) is the fourteenth Lupin III television special. It premiered on Nippon Television in 2002, as part of the commemoration of the 30th anniversary of the Lupin III TV series. The special depicts the first meeting of Lupin and the rest of his gang.

== Plot ==
Daisuke Jigen is asked by a reporter to tell the story of how he met Arsène Lupin III and the rest of the gang. He tells about the time he was hired by a millionaire named Galvez to help guard the Clam of Helmeth, a green cylinder made of unbreakable metal. The cylinder contained instructions on how to forge a metal similar to the one that composed it. The Clam has also gained the attentions of both Lupin, a fellow thief named Brad, and Brad's partner, Fujiko Mine.

Brad manages to steal the Clam, but is murdered by Galves' henchman, Shade. Lupin and Fujiko now have possession of it, but no means to open it. Meanwhile, Inspector Koichi Zenigata has been dispatched by the Japanese police to hunt down and arrest Fujiko. He is paired with George McFly, an American detective who is his only resource. And on the other side of the world, Goemon Ishikawa XIII is seeking a sword worthy of his skills.

The key to opening the Clam of Helmeth is now the focus of everyone's efforts, but who will come across it first? And, more importantly, how much of Jigen's story is the truth?

== Voice cast ==
Character	Japanese	English
Arsène Lupin III	Kanichi Kurita	Tony Oliver
Fujiko Mine	Eiko Masuyama	Michelle Ruff
Daisuke Jigen	Kiyoshi Kobayashi	Richard Epcar
Goemon Ishikawa XIII	Makio Inoue	Lex Lang
Inspector Koichi Zenigata	Gorō Naya	Doug Erholtz
Brad	Jūrōta Kosugi	Erik Kimerer
Erina	Romi Park	Amber Lee Connors
Shade	Shunsuke Sakuya	Todd Haberkorn
Galvez	Shūichirō Moriyama	Jamieson Price
Detective George McFly	Ichirō Nagai	Paul St. Peter
Commissioner Crawford	Masaru Ikeda	Derek Stephen Prince
Hans Dolarhyde	Tamio Ōki	Kyle Hebert
