= Jake Martin =

Jake Martin may refer to:

- Jake Martin, pseudonym of former voice actor Dan Lorge
- Jake Martin (All My Children), a fictional character in the U.S. TV soap opera All My Children
- Jake Martin (Degrassi character), a fictional character in the Canadian TV drama Degrassi
- Jake Martin (Fair City), a fictional character in the Irish soap opera Fair City
- Jake Martin (American football)
