= Inspector Zenigata =

Fictional human from Lupin III

- Lupin III character
- Zenigata drawn by Monkey Punch
- First appearance: Lupin III chapter 1: "The Dashing Entrance of Lupin III", August 10, 1967 (Weekly Manga Action)
- Created by: Monkey Punch
- Portrayed by: Shirō Itō (1974) (Note: Strange Psychokinetic Strategy); Tadanobu Asano (2014) (Note: Lupin the 3rd); Ryohei Suzuki (2017) (Note: Inspector Zenigata)
- Voiced by (Japanese): Gorō Naya (1971–2012); Kōichi Yamadera (2011–present); Other: Shinsuke Chikaishi (1969) (Note: Pilot Film (CinemaScope version)); Chikao Ohtsuka (1970) (Note: Pilot Film (TV version)); Seizō Katō (1987) (Note: The Fuma Conspiracy); Yukimasa Kishino (1998) (Note: Lupin III D2 Manga)
- Voiced by (English): Doug Erholtz (2017–present); Other: Greg Starr (Frontier Enterprises/Toho International: 1979) (Note: The Mystery of Mamo); David Povall (Streamline Pictures: 1992–95) (Note: The Castle of Cagliostro, Lupin the Third Part II eps. 145 and 155, The Mystery of Mamo); Marc Matney (AnimEigo: 1995) (Note: The Fuma Conspiracy); Seán Barrett (Manga Entertainment: 1996) (Note: The Mystery of Mamo, Bye Bye, Lady Liberty); Kevin Seymour (Animaze/Manga Entertainment: 2000) (Note: The Castle of Cagliostro); Dan Lorge (Geneon Entertainment/phuuz entertainment): (2002–07) (Note: Lupin the Third Part II eps. 1–79, The Mystery of Mamo, Treasure of the Sorcerer King); Phillip Wilburn (Funimation: 2002–06) (Note: The Secret of Twilight Gemini, The Pursuit of Harimao's Treasure, Dragon of Doom, Voyage to Danger, Farewell to Nostradamus, Tokyo Crisis, The Columbus Files, Dead or Alive, Island of Assassins, Missed by a Dollar); Richard Epcar (Funimation: 2013; (Note: The Woman Called Fujiko Mine) Bang Zoom! Entertainment/Discotek Media: 2014–26) (Note: Jigen's Gravestone, Goemon's Blood Spray, Fujiko's Lie, Zenigata and the Two Lupins, The Immortal Bloodline)

In-universe information
- Aliases: Heiji Zenigata VII (Note: Used in pre-1978 manga and anime iterations); Detective Ed Scott (Note: Used in Frontier Enterprises/Toho International's dub of The Mystery of Mamo); Detective Ed Cott (Note: Used in TMS' subtitled print of The Castle of Cagliostro); Keibu Zenigata (Note: Used in Streamline Pictures' dub of The Castle of Cagliostro); Detective Zenigata (Note: Used in various English dubs)
- Nicknames: Japanese: Tottsan; English: Old Man (Note: Used in pre-2002 English dubs); Pops (Note: Used in post-2002 English dubs); Gramps (Note: Used in subtitles for Lupin the 3rd film)
- Title: Inspector
- Weapon: M1911; Handcuffs
- Relatives: Zenigata Heiji (ancestor)
- Nationality: Japanese
- Affiliations: Interpol; Tokyo Metropolitan Police Department

Koichi Zenigata (Japanese: 銭形 幸一, Hepburn: Zenigata Kōichi), usually called Inspector Zenigata (銭形警部, Zenigata-keibu) and formerly Heiji Zenigata VII, is a fictional character created by Monkey Punch for his manga series Lupin III, which debuted in Weekly Manga Action on August 10, 1967. He is named after the famous fictional Japanese detective Zenigata Heiji, of whom he is a descendant.

Throughout the series, Zenigata acts as a foil to Lupin III who constantly tries to capture him at all costs, only for the latter to escape in the end. Despite holding a grudge against him, he is forced to side with him on some occasions whenever there’s a greater threat.

He is the star of the live action Inspector Zenigata TV series and portrayed by Ryohei Suzuki, making it the second Lupin III-based property not to star Lupin as the protagonist.

== Creation ==
Inspector Zenigata was conceived as Lupin's arch rival to create a "human Tom and Jerry".

Monkey Punch said that he believed the Lupin III story could never end but that if he had to, both Zenigata and Lupin would have to end as equals. They would either both fail, both win or both get very old.

== Personality ==
Inspector Zenigata hails from Japan, city of origin unknown. According to Episode 0: The First Contact, his original title was Tokyo Police Inspector whose original interest was the capture of Fujiko Mine and her then partner. His pursuit took him to New York where he first met Arsène Lupin III. He left the Japanese Police Force in favor of enlisting in Interpol (ICPO) for the sake of specifically bringing Lupin to justice. For a brief period between the first and second TV series, Zenigata was demoted to a beat cop in an unknown location of Japan.

Zenigata has made it his life's mission to arrest Lupin. The other members of Lupin's gang are targeted for apprehension as well, but Zenigata usually ignores them when Lupin himself is present. Lupin and Zenigata appear to be the worst of enemies, but in the anime they are, in a manner of speaking, friends; something Lupin shows openly (often by greeting Zenigata with mock affection), but it is an idea Zenigata is extremely reluctant to entertain. For example, in Part II, Episode 30, Zenigata initially refused to work with Lupin to escape despite both of them being held prisoner.

Similarly, he is often awed by Lupin's genius. Zenigata has an attachment to Lupin with the belief that no one should kill him or worse, capture him, besides Zenigata himself. Lupin's opinion of Zenigata is a little less caring, but still filled with respect. He often seems amazed that Zenigata can keep up with him. At times he's overwhelmed by how much thought Zenigata has put into his traps for Lupin. In instances where Zenigata has been injured in the field or believed dead, Lupin avenges the Inspector by hunting down his attacker.

While he has some interest in capturing Jigen, Goemon, and Fujiko, he is really after only Lupin, and as such shows little interest in them when Lupin himself is involved. During the course of his hunt for Lupin, Zenigata has revealed and arrested a large number of criminals from all walks of life, sometimes unintentionally and with help from Lupin. This is a major reason why ICPO tolerates his repeated failures to capture Lupin: the "collateral damage" from his lifelong quest has made him a highly rewarded and respected officer of the law.

At the beginning of Part I, he was far from a nice person. He was corrupt, opportunistic, self-serving, dangerous, obsessive and violent, and was only redeemed by his grudging respect for Lupin, who he still didn't hesitate to shoot at whenever the thief pulled off a heist. By Part I, Episode 14, he mellows out a great deal, and becomes more lovable, endearingly awkward and upbeat.

In The Mystery of Mamo, it is mentioned that Zenigata has a daughter named Toshiko, but to date this has never been mentioned since the film. In an episode of Part II, Zenigata is asked if he has any family, to which he replies "not yet". He's unable to settle down because of his eternal pursuit, and although he sometimes longs for female company (such as a reporter Maria in Crisis in Tokyo, who compares him to her father) his single-minded attitude regarding the capture of Lupin leaves no personal time available. In the 2012 series The Woman Called Fujiko Mine, Fujiko is seen performing sexual favors to an apparently willing Zenigata in order to avoid jail time. The Pioneer dub of the second anime series portrays Zenigata as having an unhealthy dependence towards his mother and continually making references to her.

Zenigata is a quite sensitive person who often weeps uncontrollably, particularly when Lupin has done him an act of consideration, or when relieved to discover Lupin is OK after assuming his death.

At times he can be surprisingly affectionate, even towards his sworn enemy. In Seven Days Rhapsody, Zenigata captures Lupin in a rough hug after he leaps from a helicopter, nuzzles him with his face and declares that they were destined to be together. In the post credits scene, Lupin is standing out in the rain and Zenigata kindly offers that they eat katsudon together in a warm interrogation room. These examples are a reference to a running joke where other characters accuse him of having a secret crush on Lupin, something he denies repeatedly, despite signs that he might actually have feelings for the thief.

On occasions when Lupin appears to be dead, he mourns him more expressively than anyone else; partly from genuine grief, partly because he no longer has a goal in life. In the 1987 OVA The Fuma Conspiracy, Zenigata actually retires from police work when he believes Lupin has died and becomes a monk, believing that if he prays enough Lupin will be a law-abiding citizen in his next life. Because of this singular ambition, he is never particularly displeased when Lupin manages to escape his custody, since that means the hunt will go on. In Part I, Episode 4, when Zenigata is able to successfully capture Lupin and place him on death row, he becomes frustrated that Lupin hasn't yet escaped after a year has passed and wishes for him to escape or be rescued by Jigen. One of the few times where he hasn't mourned Lupin's "demise" was in The Mystery of Mamo, where he is shown to be the only one who doesn't believe Lupin was actually executed, and tries to drive a stake into his body to test if he is really dead, only for the corpse to explode and Lupin to reveal himself as actually alive and well moments later, confirming his suspicions. Towards the end of the movie, he even tells Lupin that as long as there is one Lupin in the world, he'll continue to follow him "straight through the gates of Hell". In Lupin III: The First he isn't upset when Lupin appears to have died, and shifts his goal to chasing the rest of Lupin's gang.

The origin of Zenigata's and Lupin's mutual regard was based early in the series. The earliest example in production order is Part I, Episode 4, stated above. Since then, an unwritten understanding exists between the pair where neither will attempt to cause the death of the other. Further, the two are best referred as unacknowledged friends; several occasions have occurred where Lupin and gang aided Zenigata out of a life-threatening situation. In Part II, Episode 98, when a French superintendent tries to have Zenigata killed and frame Lupin for the crime, Lupin first tries to avenge the Inspector's supposed death, then when he finds out Zenigata is alive he helps him to avenge the shooter, who had spared Zenigata's life and had only hit him with a tranquilizer to make him appear dead. In Island of Assassins, when an old enemy of Lupin's shot Zenigata point blank while he helplessly watched, a wild motorcycle chase began to apprehend the killer, partly for Lupin to conclude affairs with the adversary, partly to avenge the (supposed) death of the Inspector, who would have certainly died if the ICPO chief hadn't casually mentioned Lupin's name after the Inspector flatlined.

== Physical skills ==
Zenigata as seen in Episode 0: The First Contact

Zenigata appears to be in good physical shape for his age; his proficiency in Judo and Karate have been revealed many times, with him able to dispatch multiple attackers with minimal effort. He's also capable with a jitte, the traditional Japanese police weapon designed to counter sword attacks. Other skills include his marksmanship with his weapon of choice, a Colt .45 automatic pistol, and an almost inhuman skill with throwing handcuffs, tossing them in a bola-like manner at his prey.

Zenigata's subconscious appears to be somewhat in control of his body. During chases he can perform outlandish physical feats such as jumping over huge obstacles and beating down a dozen attackers without thinking, simply because of his preoccupation with Lupin. For example, in 1997's In Memory of the Walther P-38, the mere mention of Lupin's name is enough to wake him from a coma, even as he is about to succumb to a near-fatal bullet wound. When accidentally knocked out by the stun-gun wristwatch used by Conan Edogawa in 2009's Lupin the 3rd vs Detective Conan, he was only out for a few seconds when according to Conan, it would render an elephant unconscious for 30 minutes. Zenigata's obsession when he gets upset or close to Lupin seems to give him abilities beyond the normal. Many are the heavy locked doors he manages to crash through when fury overtakes him.

The Inspector's appearance has stayed consistent through both the manga and anime series; around 6 feet, Pops has a long face ending in a bulky chin. Much like Lupin, he has extended sideburns that reach to the lower part of his cheeks. Dressed modestly in a brown business suit with white shirt and brown trench coat, he as well wears a standard flat-brim fedora. He occasionally smokes and drinks. His preferred cigarette is the Japanese made Shinsei, and enjoys hard liquor of various designs, usually bourbon or sake.

Zenigata is usually presented in the anime as clumsy and drawing hasty conclusions, but equally he is depicted with extremely efficient detective skills. As a first class manhunter, Lupin's upcoming capers are usually predicted by Zenigata based on his prey's behavior, habits, and information about Lupin's research.

== Nicknames ==
Lupin often refers to Zenigata as tottsan (とっつぁん), a form of address that is usually translated as "Old Man" or "Pops", with "Pops" being used most frequently in the English dub. Other translations have the used the terms "daddy", "daddy-o", and "papa". He is named after a famous fictional Japanese detective, Zenigata Heiji. Zenigata's ability to handcuff criminals at a distance also comes from Zenigata Heiji, who threw coins with great force and accuracy and used them as weapons to disable criminals; Koichi once himself displayed this ability when he cut a rope with gold coins in a Part 2 episode. In Japanese, the title of inspector is keibu (警部), although the Streamline dub Castle of Cagliostro erroneously stated Keibu as Zenigata's first name, as did his passport in the Part III episode Steal the Pyramid of Insurance Money. In the Filipino dub of the series, Lupin refers to Zenigata as "depektib", a play on the words "detective" and "defective". In "Lupin III: Burning Memory - Tokyo Crisis", the landlady nicknames him "Kou-chan" when he comes home to find his apartment burned down. He has been nicknamed "Zeni" by various characters, including Fujiko, Jasmin and even at times Lupin himself.

== Actors ==
=== Animation ===
==== Japanese ====
Inspector Zenigata was first voiced by Shinsuke Chikaishi in the CinemaScope version of the 1969 pilot film for the first anime, while Chikao Ōtsuka voiced him in the pilot's TV version. However, Gorō Naya was given the role when the first anime was actually produced (1971–72) and he continued to voice the character until 2010. The only exception to Naya's run as the character was for the 1987 original video animation The Fuma Conspiracy; due to budget concerns, TMS decided not to employ the regular voice cast. Zenigata was voiced by Seizō Katō.

The 2011 TV special Blood Seal of the Eternal Mermaid marked the first appearance of Kōichi Yamadera as the character, and he continues to voice Inspector Zenigata to this day. Naya did return to the role once more for the 2012 Lupin Family Lineup short original video animation, which was the final performance of the surviving original Lupin III voice cast.

==== English ====
Greg Starr voiced Inspector Zenigata (renamed "Detective Ed Scott") in the 1979 Frontier English dub of The Mystery of Mamo. David Povall voiced Zenigata in multiple Streamline dubs from 1991 to 1995, including Mamo and The Castle of Cagliostro, where he was named Keibu Zenigata due to a translation error. Marc Matney provided Zenigata's voice in the 1995 Coastal Carolina Sound Studios dub of The Fuma Conspiracy. Manga UK dubs featured Seán Barrett in Mamo and Bye Bye, Lady Liberty (1996). Kevin Seymour voiced Zenigata in the Animaze dub of Cagliostro (2000). Phillip Wilburn voiced the character for Funimation's dubs of several TV specials and theatrical films between 2002 and 2006.

Dan Lorge voiced Zenigata in the phuuz dub for Pioneer/Geneon's release of the second anime between 2003 and 2006, additionally voicing the character in the 2004 dub of The Mystery of Mamo and Treasure of the Sorcerer King. Richard Epcar was given the role for Funimation's 2013 dub of The Woman Called Fujiko Mine, and reprises the role in the Bang Zoom! Entertainment/Discotek Media releases of the spinoff Lupin the IIIrd films. In 2017, Doug Erholtz took over the role for Discotek's dub of Part IV. This dub largely reunited the Phuuz cast from Part II; Erholtz replaced Lorge, who had retired. Erholtz has continued to voice the character in subsequent productions.

=== Live-Action ===
Shirō Itō portrayed the Inspector in Lupin III: Strange Psychokinetic Strategy (1974). Tadanobu Asano starred as Zenigata in the 2014 film Lupin the 3rd.

Japan's NTV broadcast network featured a live action Inspector Zenigata TV special and subsequent series with Ryohei Suzuki, (Hentai Karmen, Gatchaman both 2013) starring as the Inspector. The show follows the character as a brilliant, doggedly capable ICPO officer successfully chasing down an assortment of criminals. Joining Suzuki are Atsuko Maeda and Takahiro Miura as the Inspector's neophyte detective aides. The series and special's first poster visual was revealed on January 16, 2017, and both were presented on Hulu Japan in February 2017.

== Reception ==
Zenigata was voted the eighth best supporting character in anime by Mania.com. Mania.com also put Zenigata as the 9th greatest anime detective.

Mike Crandoll of Anime News Network compared Zenigata's pursuit of Lupin to Wile E. Coyote.
