= Tony Oliver =

Puerto Rican voice actor

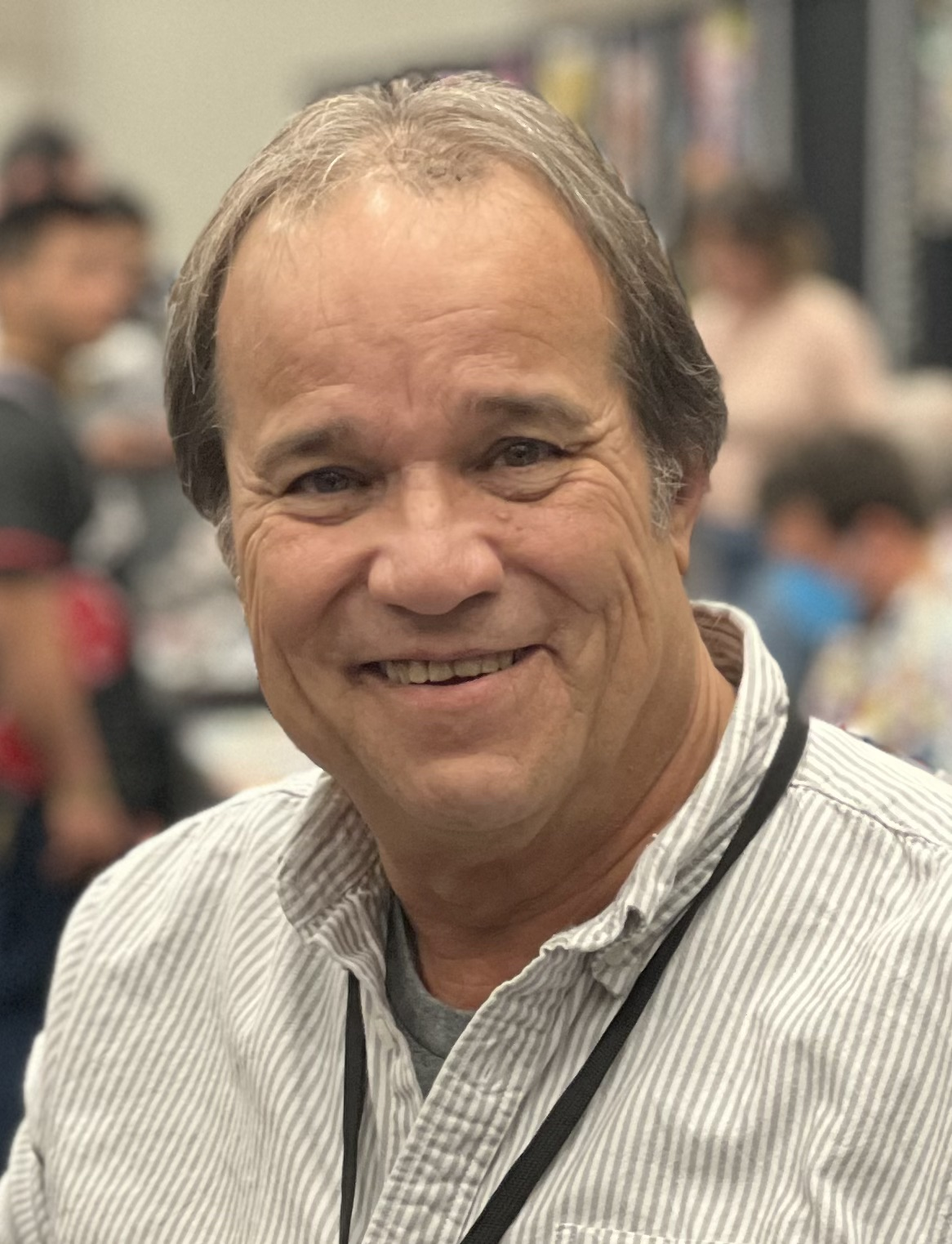
- Oliver at SacAnime Roseville in 2025
- Born: 1958 (age 67–68); San Juan, Puerto Rico
- Occupations: Voice actor; voice director; script writer; producer
- Years active: 1975–present
- Website: www.tonyoliverentertainment.com

Tony Oliver (born 1958) is a Puerto Rican voice actor and voice director. He is best known for voicing Rick Hunter from Robotech, Lancer from Fate/stay night, and Arsène Lupin III from Lupin the Third. He helped produce the live action shows Mighty Morphin Power Rangers and VR Troopers.

== Power Rangers casting criticism ==
In the Investigation Discovery series Hollywood Demons, Oliver said it was a "mistake" to cast an Asian actress to play the Yellow Ranger and a Black actor to play the Black Ranger in Mighty Morphin Power Rangers. When the casting was originally done, Oliver said that "none of us [were] thinking stereotypes". However, Walter Emanuel Jones, who played the Black Ranger, responded by defending the casting decision of that character. He wrote on Instagram, "I understand the impulse to address what might be seen as cultural insensitivity, but calling it a 'mistake' would dismiss the impact it had on countless people around the world who found inspiration and representation in TV's first Black superhero — morphin' into none other than the Black Power Ranger! It wasn't a mistake; it was a milestone. It was an honor."

== Filmography ==
=== Anime ===
List of dubbing performances in anime
Year	Series	Voice role	Notes	Source
1985	Captain Harlock and the Queen of a Thousand Years	Christopher "Chris" Jenson		
1985	Robotech series	Rick Hunter	Also Sentinels	
1991	Fist of the North Star: The Movie	Bat		
2000–02	Rurouni Kenshin and Fighting Spirit	Daigoro, Toromaru and Eiji Date		
2000	Gate Keepers	Hippie		
2001	Transformers: Robots in Disguise	Additional voices	Voice director	
2003	Lupin the Third Part II	Arsène Lupin III; additional voices	Also in Part IV, Part V, Part 6 and various movies and specials	
2003	Please Teacher! series		Voice director/writer, also Twins	
2004–05	Gankutsuou: The Count of Monte Cristo		Voice director/writer	
2004	Gungrave	Harry MacDowell		
2004	I'll / CKBC	Yoshiki		
2004	Marmalade Boy	Bill Matheson		
2004	Space Pirate Captain Herlock: The Endless Odyssey	Yasu		
2004	Stellvia	Joy Jones, Headmaster		
2004–05	Gankutsuou: The Count of Monte Cristo	Maximilien Morrel		
2004	Submarine 707R	Ryota Yamada		
2004	Wolf's Rain	Horse		
2004–05	Ghost in the Shell: Stand Alone Complex	Sugi, others	Also 2nd Gig	
2005	New Getter Robo		Voice director/writer	
2005	IGPX	Edgeraid Coach	TV series	
2005	Overman King Gainer	Hughes Gauli	Voice director/writer	
2005–06	Naruto	Minato Namikaze		
2005	Planetes	Yankees, Keith	Voice director/writer	
2005	Tenchi Muyo!	Misao Kuramitsu	OVA3	
2005	Ultra Maniac	Tetsuji Kaiji		
2005–06	Saiyuki series	Sha Gojyo	Reload and Gunlock	
2006	Eureka Seven	Hap	Voice director/writer	
2006	Haré+Guu		Voice director, ADR writer	
2006	Fate/stay night	Lancer/Cú Chulainn		
2006	Haré+Guu	Rick		
2006	Karas	Detective Sawada		
2007	Flag	Takashi		
2007	Tokko	Ranmaru Shindo		
2008	Gurren Lagann	Simon (Old), Narrator	Voice director/writer	
2008	Lucky Star	Sojiro Izumi		
2008	Tweeny Witches	Jidan	Voice director/writer	
2009–16	Naruto Shippuden	Minato Namikaze		
2011	K-On! series		Voice director	
2011	Marvel Anime: Wolverine	Juo Kurohagi		
2011–12	Squid Girl	Clark	Voice director	
2012	JoJo's Bizarre Adventure: Phantom Blood	Bruford	Only appears in Part 1	
2012	Magi: The Kingdom of Magic series		Voice director, also Labyrinth	
2012	Nura: Rise of the Yokai Clan series		Voice director	
2014	Gargantia on the Verdurous Planet		Voice director	
2015	Lupin the Third Part IV: The Italian Adventure	Arsène Lupin III		
2015	Fate/stay night: Unlimited Blade Works	Lancer/Cú Chulainn		
2016	Love Live!		Voice director	
2016	Charlotte		Voice director	
2017	Fate/Grand Order: First Order	Caster/Cú Chulainn		
2018	Beyblade Burst Turbo	Benimaru		
2018	Lupin the 3rd Part 5	Arsène Lupin III		
2022	Lupin the 3rd Part 6	Arsène Lupin III		
2023	Scott Pilgrim Takes Off	First A.D.	Voice director	

=== Animation ===
List of voice performances and production work in animation
Year	Series	Voice role	Crew role	Notes	Source
2013	NFL Rush Zone	Chargers Rusher	Episode: "There's Snow Place Like Home"		

=== Live-action roles ===
List of acting and voice performances in live-action film and television
Year	Series	Voice role	Crew role	Notes	Source
1993–95	Mighty Morphin Power Rangers	Saba, Wizard of Deception, Needlenose	Supervising producer (Season 1-2), co-producer (Season 3), writer (Season 1-2)		
1994–96	VR Troopers	Dice	Supervising producer		
1996	Power Rangers Zeo		Co-producer, writer		
1997	Power Rangers Turbo		writer		
1998	Power Rangers in Space	Frightwing / Leonardo		2 episodes; Uncredited	
2001	Power Rangers: Time Force	Klawlox			
2002	Power Rangers: Wild Force	Signal Org			

=== Film ===
List of voice performances and production work in feature films
Year	Series	Voice role	Crew role	Notes	Source
1982	The Sea Prince and the Fire Child	Sirius, Goldfish Walla, Green Minion, Japanese Fighting Fish, Male Hermit Crab, Plankton Walla, Red Octopus, Sand Creature C, Sea Bunny Walla		Debut role	
1995	Mighty Morphin Power Rangers: The Movie	Saba			
2003	Lupin the Third: The Mystery of Mamo	Arsène Lupin III			
2006	Robotech: The Shadow Chronicles	Rick Hunter			
2018	Fate/stay night: Heaven's Feel I. presage flower	Lancer/Cú Chulainn			
2018	Lupin the Third: Legend of the Gold of Babylon	Arsène Lupin III			
2019	Lupin the Third: Blood Seal of the Eternal Mermaid	Arsène Lupin III			
2020	Lupin the Third: Goodbye Partner	Arsène Lupin III			
2020	Lupin III: The First	Arsène Lupin III			
2025	The Castle of Cagliostro	Arsène Lupin III			

List of voice performances and production work in direct-to-video films and television specials
Year	Series	Voice role	Crew role	Notes	Source
1998	Rusty: A Dog's Tale	Gabby the Goat, Rebel the Dog		Live-action anime dub	
1990	Fist of the North Star: The Movie	Bat			
2001	Akira	Various characters		Animaze/Pioneer dub	
2001	Ah! My Goddess: The Movie	Keiichi			
2004	ex-Driver: the Movie	Joe			
2004	Mobile Suit Gundam F91	George Azuma		Voice director/writer	
2012	Sengoku Basara: The Last Party	Hideaki Kobayakawa		Live-action anime dub	
2012	Fate/stay night: Unlimited Blade Works	Lancer/Cú Chulainn			

=== Video game roles ===
List of voice performances and production work in video games
Year	Title	Voice role	Notes	Source
2003-14	Dynasty Warriors series	Ma Chao (Dynasty Warriors 4); Xiahou Yuan, Lu Meng (Dynasty Warriors 6: Special - Dynasty Warriors 8: Xtreme Legends); Miscellaneous generals (Dynasty Warriors 4 - Dynasty Warriors 8: Xtreme Legends)		
2004	Samurai Warriors series	Mori Ranmaru (Samurai Warriors - Samurai Warriors: Xtreme Legends)		
2004	Lupin the 3rd: Treasure of the Sorcerer King	Arsène Lupin III	English dub, PS2	
2007-09	Warriors Orochi series	Xiahou Yuan, Lu Meng (Warriors Orochi 2); Miscellaneous generals (Warriors Orochi - Warriors Orochi 2)		
2009	Klonoa	King Seadoph, Forest Guardian	Wii	
2009	BlazBlue: Calamity Trigger	Bang Shishigami		
2010	Sengoku Basara: Samurai Heroes	Naoe Kanetsugu, Kobayakawa Hideaki		
2011–16	Naruto Shippuden: Ultimate Ninja series	Minato Namikaze	Also Storm, Impact	
2014	Grand Chase	Uno		
2014	Power Rangers Super Megaforce	Various voices	Also Voice Director	
2022	Ghostbusters: Spirits Unleashed	Ghostbusters		
2025	Bleach Rebirth of Souls	Ulquiorra Shifar		

=== Documentaries ===
List of appearances in documentaries
Year	Series	Role	Notes	Source
2008	Adventures in Voice Acting	Himself		
