= List of Lupin III television specials =

The main characters of Lupin III as they appear on the DVD cover of the 14th television special

This is a list of television specials of the Japanese media franchise Lupin III, based on the manga series by Monkey Punch that debuted in 1967. Beginning in 1989 with Bye Bye, Lady Liberty, every year until 2013 featured a 90 minute Lupin III anime television special that aired on NTV at 9:03 on Friday evening. Since then, they have been released irregularly, with the 27th and latest being November 2019's Prison of the Past.

Each television special features its own unique story, with plots generally centering on the adventures of gentleman thief Lupin III, and his criminal gang: Daisuke Jigen, crack-shot and Lupin's closest ally; Fujiko Mine, femme fatale and love interest who works against Lupin more often than with him; and Goemon Ishikawa XIII, a master swordsman and descendant of legendary Japanese bandit Ishikawa Goemon. Lupin is often chased by ICPO Inspector Koichi Zenigata, a dogged detective who has made it his life mission to catch Lupin. The 2009 Lupin III vs. Detective Conan special is, as the title suggests, a crossover between Lupin III and Detective Conan and as such features characters from both series.

Manga Entertainment released the first special on home video in the United Kingdom and Australia in 1996 as Goodbye Lady Liberty, using an English dub that they created in London with an American-British cast. Funimation purchased the North American releasing rights to specials five through twelve in 2002, in a package that also included the two theatrical films Farewell to Nostradamus and Dead or Alive. They re-titled several of the animations for their release. Discotek Media has released all 27 Lupin III specials in North America as of 2024, including those previously licensed by Funimation. They began with Episode 0: The First Contact in March 2010, and completed all 27 with Italian Game in September 2024. They also released the Lupin III vs. Detective Conan special and its theatrical film sequel on October 27, 2015.

== Specials ==
| No. | Title | Directed by | Written by | Audience Share | Original release date | English release date |
|---|---|---|---|---|---|---|
| 1 | "Bye-Bye Liberty – Close Call! / Bye Bye Liberty Crisis (JP) / Goodbye Lady Liberty (UK/AUS) / Bye Bye, Lady Liberty (US)"; Transliteration: "Baibai Ribatī – Kiki Ippatsu!" (Japanese: バイバイ・リバティー・危機一発!) | Osamu Dezaki | Hiroshi Kashiwabara | 13.3% | April 1, 1989 | September 9, 1996 (UK); March 25, 2014 (US) |
Lupin is forced to give up his life of crime when he discovers police computers are able to predict his every move. His retirement is short-lived when his colleague Jigen inherits the secret location of a stolen giant diamond called the "Super Egg", which is hidden in the Statue of Liberty; Lupin helps recover the diamond by stealing the entire Statue. Meanwhile, Goemon becomes bodyguard to a beautiful woman who is on the run from a sinister secret society which is also seeking the Super Egg.
| 2 | "The Mystery of the Hemingway Papers / The Hemingway Papers"; Transliteration: "Heminguwei Pēpā no Nazo" (Japanese: ヘミングウェイ・ペーパーの謎) | Osamu Dezaki | Hiroshi Kashiwabara | 19.1% | July 20, 1990 | May 27, 2014 |
Lupin heads to the Mediterranean island of Colcaca in pursuit of a box said to contain a draft of Ernest Hemingway's final, unfinished novel which supposedly describes the author's last journey and his discovery of great riches. Unfortunately, the island has been under siege by would-be treasure hunters for ten years. These are divided into two factions, led by self-appointed president Carlos and his rival, the warlord Consano. They do not take kindly to intruders, and have turned the island into one big battle zone. Lupin discovers that Goemon and Jigen have, for their own reasons, teamed up with respectively Carlos and Consano, who intend to use them as their trump cards in battle. The arrival of gun runner Marcess and his beautiful, busty secretary could further inflame the situation. With the help of local barkeep Maria, Lupin tries to reunite his gang and uncover the treasure before the conflict of the commanders gets totally out of hand. Preferably in time to stop his friends from having to kill each other...
| 3 | "Steal Napoleon's Dictionary! / Napoleon's Dictionary"; Transliteration: "Naporeon no Jisho o Ubae" (Japanese: ナポレオンの辞書を奪え) | Yukio Okazaki and Keitaro Motonaga, Supervising Director: Osamu Dezaki | Hiroshi Kashiwabara | 17.6% | August 9, 1991 | January 27, 2015 |
Lupin decides to participate in a classic car race because he wants the first prize – the dictionary that once belonged to Napoleon. It may not contain the word "impossible", but it DOES contain directions to Lupin's grandfather's treasure – a treasure literally sought by the whole world, since the G7 nations want it in order to rebuild the world economy after the Gulf War. No one knows where or what it is, but it's said to be worth trillions of dollars – and Lupin, being the rightful heir, is assumed to be the one to ask. So Lupin must not only win the race, he also has to avoid several intelligence agencies and Inspector Zenigata, all set on capturing him to get the location of the treasure. Luckily, his friends are there to back him up, but are they enough against the combined military forces of the allied nations?
| 4 | "From Russia with Love / Bank of Liberty (JP) / From Siberia with Love (US)"; Transliteration: "Roshia yori Ai o Komete" (Japanese: ロシアより愛をこめて) | Osamu Dezaki | Hiroshi Kashiwabara | 18.8% | July 24, 1992 | June 2, 2015 |
A horde of lost Romanov gold has turned up in San Antonio, and Lupin aims to add it to his collection. Aiding him in his larceny is Jigen, Fujiko, and Judy Scott, an expert on the Romanov family. Unfortunately for Lupin, Rasputon, the descendant of legendary mystic Rasputin, is also seeking the gold and has convinced Goemon to do his bidding. Can Lupin outwit Rasputon, Rasputon's henchmen, Goemon, and the New York mafia to claim the gold?
| 5 | "Orders to Assassinate Lupin / Voyage to Danger"; Transliteration: "Rupan Ansatsu Shirei" (Japanese: ルパン暗殺指令) | Masaaki Osumi | Hiroshi Kashiwabara | 22% | July 23, 1993 | May 20, 2003 (Original); July 26, 2016 (Re-release) |
Inspector Zenigata has been taken off the Lupin case due to his inability to capture him, and been replaced with a much more ruthless agent, Keith, who will gladly take Lupin dead if he cannot take him alive. This does not sit well with Zenigata, who has always had a respect for Lupin. He goes against his orders and gives this information to the master thief, giving Lupin and his gang the edge they need to stay alive. Meanwhile, Zenigata has been transferred to investigating a terrorist group, Shot Shell. In order to gain the organization's interest, Lupin steals a nuclear submarine from Russia and kidnaps a Russian physicist, Karen, to help him run it. Karen has a link to Jigen's past and seems bent on revenge on him for her father twenty years ago. Shot Shell takes the bait and forms something of a partnership, but little do Lupin and his gang realize that the illegal arms dealers are also partners with Keith.
| 6 | "Burn, Zantetsuken! / Dragon of Doom"; Transliteration: "Moeyo Zantetsuken" (Japanese: 燃えよ斬鉄剣) | Masaharu Okuwaki | Nobuaki Kishima | 24.9% | July 29, 1994 | February 11, 2003 (Original); August 25, 2020 (Re-release) |
Lupin, Jigen, and Fujiko are contacted by a Hong Kong gangster, Chen Zhenzhong, to steal a metal statue of a dragon lost when the Titanic sank. Lupin refuses to work for Chen, but retains an interest in the statue; his grandfather Arsène Lupin attempted and failed to steal it on that fateful voyage. The three decide to go after it on their own. Unknown to them, the statue also contains the secret of making an impenetrable alloy that surpasses Goemon's fantastic katana, Zantetsuken. Goemon himself has also received word of the statue's location, and vows to retrieve it to keep his family's honor intact, even if his rival is his old ally Lupin. A childhood friend, Kikyo, assists him in his mission. When the statue is retrieved from the wreckage by Lupin, the three groups collide in a chaotic attempt to keep the statue for themselves.
| 7 | "The Pursuit of Harimao's Treasure"; Transliteration: "Harimao no Zaihō o Oe!!" (Japanese: ハリマオの財宝を追え!!) | Osamu Dezaki | Hiroshi Kashiwabara; Shinzō Fujita; Shōji Yonemura | 20.6% | August 4, 1995 | September 24, 2002 (Original); October 27, 2020 (Re-release) |
Lupin searches for three statues that are keys to the legendary treasure of Harimao, a thief who stole billions during World War II. Lupin succeeds in acquiring one of the statues, but then, much to his surprise, Lupin is forced to ally himself with Lord Archer and his daughter Diana to obtain the remaining two. However, Neo-Himmel, a group of neo-Nazis led by Herr Maffrodite, are also after the fantastic treasure and will stop at nothing to get it.
| 8 | "The Secret of Twilight Gemini"; Transliteration: "Towairaito Jemini no Himitsu" (Japanese: トワイライト☆ジェミニの秘密) | Gisaburō Sugii | Hideki Mitsui; Gisaburō Sugii; Naoya Azuma | 16.8% | August 2, 1996 | April 30, 2002 (Original); November 24, 2020 (Re-release) |
Don Dolune, a former associate of Lupin, gives Lupin half of a diamond called the Twilight. By finding the other half of the diamond, it will allow Lupin to access a fantastic treasure. Lupin and Jigen travel to Morocco with some interference from Inspector Zenigata. The two find a great deal of civil unrest in Morocco as a tribe known as the Gelts are seeking to restore themselves to power. Things become complicated when Lupin falls for Lara, one of the Gelt rebel leaders. Lupin is followed by a group of assassins, headed by the twisted male whip-wielding Sadachiyo, who is seeking the treasure of the Twilight for the head of a secret society.
| 9 | "Walther P-38 (In Memory of the Walther P38) / Island of Assassins"; Transliteration: "Warusā P38 ~In Gedenken an die Walther P38~" (Japanese: ワルサーP38) | Toshiya Shinohara; Hiroyuki Yano | Shōji Yonemura | 21.8% | August 1, 1997 | April 26, 2005 (Original); May 30, 2017 (Re-release) |
Lupin investigates the news of a fake version of one of his trademark calling cards during a high-class party. A group of assassins, the Tarantula, crash the party and murder the host. Zenigata, investigating the card, chases Lupin but ends up shot and injured by a silver Walther P38. Lupin, catching a glimpse of the familiar gun, is determined to avenge not only Zenigata, but an episode of his past. He and Fujiko infiltrate the island by joining Tarantula, while Jigen and Goemon hide in the underground. Lupin also befriends Elen, an assassin who is disillusioned with Tarantula following the death of her younger brother who was also with the organization. Prevented from leaving by an ingenious poison and also interested in Tarantula's large stock of gold, Lupin and his gang work to bring down the assassins and find the bearer of the silver Walther.
| 10 | "Memories of Blaze: Tokyo Crisis / Crisis in Tokyo (Funimation) / Tokyo Crisis (Discotek Media)"; Transliteration: "Honō no Kioku ~Tokyo Crisis~" (Japanese: 炎の記憶〜TOKYO CRISIS〜) | Toshiya Shinohara | Shinzō Fujita | 24.1% | July 24, 1998 | August 30, 2005 (Original); December 29, 2020 (Re-release) |
Lupin attempts and fails to steal a valuable set of Japanese photographic plates. The rightful owner of the plates, Michael Suzuki, is a multimillionaire who is preparing to open a huge water park in Tokyo. Lupin attempts to enlist the help of his steadfast comrades Jigen and Goemon but find them less than reliable; Jigen is suffering from a toothache that throws off his legendary aim, and Goemon has shamefully had his sword, Zantetsuken, stolen by a woman and given to Suzuki to display in his art collection. The group works on a plan with Fujiko to get both the plates and Zantetsuken. Meanwhile, Inspector Zenigata has a journalist named Maria following him around, reporting on his job; however, she'd much rather be investigating Suzuki. However, she, Lupin, and Zenigata eventually discover she has a connection to a dark part of Suzuki's past, one that he will go to any lengths to eliminate.
| 11 | "Da Capo of Love: Fujiko's Unlucky Days / The Columbus Files"; Transliteration: "Ai no Da Kāpo – Fujiko's Unlucky Days" (Japanese: 愛のダ・カーポ〜FUJIKO'S Unlucky Days〜) | Shinichi Watanabe | Shinzō Fujita | 20% | July 30, 1999 | November 29, 2005 (Original); February 23, 2021 (Re-release) |
During a romantic dinner with Lupin, Fujiko tells him about the Columbus Files, information that leads to a legendary treasure called the Columbus Egg. Before she can let Lupin in on the information, the rascally Nazaroff and his men attack. Chasing the two through the woods, Lupin and Fujiko find themselves cornered and hanging off of a cliff. Lupin cannot save Fujiko, who plummets to the ground below when a bullet severs the rope. Fujiko finds herself in the care of treasure hunter Rosaria, but unable to remember her name or anything about her past. Lupin, Jigen, and Goemon manage to track Fujiko down and try to help her remember who she is, but she is kidnapped by Nazaroff and his employer, who want the secrets of the Columbus Files and the Columbus Egg, which involve the mysterious Orgone energy. The film becomes a race to get hold of Fujiko, the information, and the treasure itself.
| 12 | "$1 Money Wars / Missed by a Dollar"; Transliteration: "1 Doru Manē Wōzu" (Japanese: 1$マネーウォーズ) | Hideki Tonokatsu | Hiroshi Kashiwabara | 19.7% | July 28, 2000 | March 14, 2005 (Original); March 30, 2021 (Re-release) |
Lupin tries to acquire a quite plain ring at an auction, but is outbid by one dollar. Thus thwarted, he decides to steal it instead, and enlists the help of Jigen and Goemon. Cynthia, head of the Bank of the World, is the auction winner and their target. The ring is the key to locating a legendary brooch – Lupin's true objective. The robbery goes well until the getaway, when Lupin is shot out of a helicopter, falling towards his death. His comrades bury him and swears to finish what he started, and Inspector Zenigata resigns in grief. Shortly thereafter, Lupin reappears in disguise to save the gang from a deadly trap. His tricks have once again saved him, and now he's after Cynthia, who trusts the brooch will give her the same fortune as its previous owners Napoleon and Hitler. Her henchman/admirer Nabikov is helping her with a plan for world domination, and is also the man who shot Lupin.
| 13 | "Alcatraz Connection"; Transliteration: "Arukatorazu Konekushon" (Japanese: アルカトラズコネクション) | Hideki Tonokatsu | Hiroshi Kashiwabara | 22.8% | August 3, 2001 | June 7, 2016 |
Somewhere off the coast of San Francisco lies a sunken ship filled with gold ingots, and Lupin has just stolen some data to help him track it down. What Lupin and the gang does not know is that a crime syndicate known only as the "Secret Seven" is also after the sunken gold. Zenigata and his SFPD counterpart are hot on Lupin's trail, and mysterious men in black seem to shadow Lupin's every move. Who will win the race to the gold, and what connection does the gold have to Alcatraz and John F. Kennedy?
| 14 | "Episode 0: First Contact / Episode 0: The First Contact"; Transliteration: "Episode: 0 Fāsuto Kontakuto" (Japanese: EPISODE:0 ファーストコンタクト) | Minoru Ohara | Shōji Yonemura | 20.6% | July 26, 2002 | March 30, 2010 |
Jigen is asked by a reporter to tell the story of how he met Lupin and the rest of the gang. He tells about the time he was hired by a millionaire named Galves to help guard the Clam of Hermes, a green cylinder made of unbreakable metal. The cylinder contained instructions on how to forge a metal similar to the one that composed it. The Clam has also gained the attentions of both Lupin, a fellow thief named Brad, and Brad's partner, Fujiko. Brad manages to steal the Clam, but is murdered by Galves' henchman, Shade. Lupin and Fujiko now have possession of it, but no means to open it. Meanwhile, Inspector Zenigata has been dispatched by the Japanese police to hunt down and arrest Fujiko. He is paired with George McFly, an American detective who is his only resource. And on the other side of the world, Goemon is seeking a sword worthy of his skills. The key to opening the Clam of Mermes is now the focus of everyone's efforts, but who will come across it first? And, more importantly, how much of Jigen's story is the truth?
| 15 | "Operation Return the Treasure"; Transliteration: "Otakara Henkyaku Dai-sakusen!!" (Japanese: お宝返却大作戦!!) | Jun Kawagoe | Hiroshi Kashiwabara | 22% | August 1, 2003 | December 6, 2016 |
The last will of master thief Mark Williams is for his old friend Lupin to return several famous objects to their rightful places, including the Bocca della Verità, a coffee maker from the first bottega da caffe in the Plaza San Marco, the speedboat/hovercraft gondola that James Bond used in the movie Moonraker, original can-can dresses from the Moulin Rouge, a car custom-made for the king of a Middle East country – which is actually a Mercedes-Benz 300SLR, and lastly The Little Mermaid statue in Copenhagen, Denmark. All of which Mark stole in his lifetime. Doing so within a certain time limit will reveal to Lupin the location of the Trick Diamond, a jewel thought to be worthless because its only ability is to catch and retain light. Lupin, however, is certain that the stone holds more than meets the eye, as it is connected with both the Tunguska incident and the construction of La Sagrada Família in Barcelona. A Russian mobster and his cohorts are also after the diamond, as it is rumored to be able to reveal an incredible treasure. As Lupin and his gang attempt to return the artifacts, they run into more trouble than they expected when the mob crosses paths with them. Lupin ends up on his own when Jigen captured and Goemon is injured and unable to use his sword. Lupin must now put the pieces together if he wants to uncover the fantastic treasure in time.
| 16 | "Stolen Lupin ~ The Copy Cat is a Midsummer's Butterfly~ / Swallowtail Tattoo"; Transliteration: "Nusumareta Rupan ~Copī Kyatto wa Manatsu no Chō~" (Japanese: 盗まれたルパン 〜コピーキャットは真夏の蝶〜) | Hidehito Ueda | Toshimichi Ōkawa | 21.1% | July 30, 2004 | March 28, 2023 |
After another daring heist, Lupin finds himself stolen; he is kidnapped by the crime lord Malchovich, and is forced to agree to steal the infamous 'Bull's Eye' jewel – or Fujiko will be killed by a bomb strapped around her neck. However, Lupin's progress is hindered by a young woman named Becky, who is out to prove herself by outdoing him in the field of thievery. She turns out to be the daughter of Cat, Lupin's first partner in crime...and her father's identity is anyone's guess. Eventually, it's revealed that the Malchovich and company have set everything up to acquire the fabled "Lupin Collection" – the valuables Lupin has amassed during his long and successful career. With a couple of highly skilled warriors in his employ, Malchovich is determined to get rid of Lupin once and for all. But there are of course a couple of surprises awaiting for both sides of the conflict.
| 17 | "An Angel's Tactics – Fragments of a Dream Are the Scent of Murder / Angel Tactics"; Transliteration: "Tenshi no Takutikusu ~Yume no Kakera wa Koroshi no Kaori~" (Japanese: 天使の策略(タクティクス) 〜夢のカケラは殺しの香り〜) | Shigeyuki Miya | Atsushi Maekawa | 19% | July 22, 2005 | June 27, 2023 |
Lupin and his friends are targeted by the all-female terrorist group "Bloody Angels". They are after the "original metal" – a mysterious object Lupin stole from Area 51. Lupin's weakness for women is certainly not going to be any help this time. Neither is Goemon, unless he can find a way to mend the damage made by his overconfidence in his sword. The major question is whether this is just a series of professional assassination attempts or if the Angels have an underlying agenda...or a personal grudge.
| 18 | "Seven Days Rhapsody"; Transliteration: "Sebun Deizu Rapusodi" (Japanese: セブンデイズ・ラプソディ) | Hajime Kamegaki | Hiroshi Kashiwabara | 17.7% | September 8, 2006 | December 26, 2023 |
Lupin and Jigen have a heist in seven days. But they split up to help friends; Jigen joins up with a mercenary, and Lupin gets involved in the life of a young girl named Michelle. Everything revolves around a gigantic diamond--which Fujiko and Goemon have their sights on too. With no one to turn to and double-crosses galore, can Lupin pull things together in a week?
| 19 | "The Elusiveness of the Fog"; Transliteration: "Kiri no Eryūshivu" (Japanese: 霧のエリューシヴ) | Toshihiko Masuda | Yoshifumi Fukushima; Yuka Yamada | 17% | July 27, 2007 | April 27, 2021 |
After receiving a clue from Fujiko, Lupin and his gang go searching for a legendary undersea treasure in Kiritappu, Japan. Quick enough, Inspector Zenigata chases them from the dig site and up the road to a strange lighthouse, where they are met by a strange figure calling himself "Mamou." Mamou clearly has it out for Lupin, and after a bit of a light show, sends Lupin, Goemon and Jigen 500 years into the past, with Zenigata right behind them. Now the trio is caught up in a land war between two ancient tribes, and are forced to solve the mystery of the legendary treasure as the time-traveler Mamou threatens to remove Fujiko from existence by erasing her ancestor!
| 20 | "Sweet Lost Night ~The Magic Lamp's Nightmare Premonition~ / Sweet Lost Night"; Transliteration: "Sweet Lost Night ~Mahō no Ranpu wa Akumu no Yokan~" (Japanese: sweet lost night 〜魔法のランプは悪夢の予感〜) | Tetsuro Amino | Toshimichi Ōkawa | 14.4% | July 25, 2008 | January 30, 2024 |
Fujiko sends Lupin and the gang into the desert on the trail of a magic lamp. But everyone wants it, including the warmonger Colonel Garlic and a mysterious woman. It all goes sideways when Lupin is robbed of his memory--and you should never steal from a thief!
| — | "Lupin III vs. Detective Conan"; Transliteration: "Rupan Sansei vs Meitantei Konan" (Japanese: ルパン三世VS名探偵コナン) | Hajime Kamegaki | Atsushi Maekawa | 19.5% | March 27, 2009 | October 27, 2015 |
Lupin attempts to steal a royal crown from the fictional country of Vespania after its owner, the queen, is assassinated by her son, who then shot himself. Jigen infiltrates the National Guard as a sharpshooting instructor, while Fujiko tails the princess, on holiday in Japan. Meanwhile, Conan Edogawa saves the princess, who looks exactly like his friend Ran, from an assassination attempt. Inspector Zenigata teams up with Kogoro Mori to catch the assassin and foil Lupin's scheme. Fujiko kidnaps the princess while leaving Ran to act as her double. In the end, Conan and Lupin have to team up to find out the truth behind the assassination and save the princess from the same fate.
| 21 | "The Last Job" | Tetsuro Amino | Toshimichi Ōkawa | 17.6% | February 12, 2010 | April 28, 2020 |
Lupin sends a letter to Zenigata announcing he will steal their cargo, the Buddha's statue. Lupin succeeds and Zenigata gives chase. A villain named Morgana intervenes the chase, stealing the statue and killing Zenigata in the process. After Zenigata's funeral, Lupin reveals to his comrades he was after the secret inside the Buddha statue. Asuka, revealing she is part of the Fuma Ninja clan and explains the statue's secret leads to a device known as the Fujin and her clan had left her to protect its secrets. Lupin, Asuka, and Morgana confront each other three times attempting to steal a sword that opens up the Buddha statue, the Hexagonal crystal that leads to the Fujin, and the Fujin itself. Asuka is taken hostage by Morganna who also happens to gain possession of the Fujin and coaxes Lupin to confront him once final time. Morganna is able to activate the Fujin when Asuka's Shiba Inu howls and reveals the Fujin is a black hole generator and attempts to kill Lupin and his comrades. Lupin manages to steal the Fujin and redirects the black hole towards Morganna. In the end, Zenigata, revealed to have been put in a death like state by Asuka to protect him from Morganna, re-hires Asuka and attempts to apprehend Lupin.
| 22 | "Blood Seal – Eternal Mermaid / Blood Seal of the Eternal Mermaid"; Transliteration: "Chi no Kokuin – Eien no Māmeido" (Japanese: 血の刻印 〜永遠のMermaid〜) | Teiichi Takiguchi | Michihiro Tsuchiya | 14% | December 2, 2011 | July 30, 2019 |
A pair of jewels hold the secret to an even greater treasure, but there are so many obstacles in Lupin's way. The smallest one is Maki, a precocious fourteen-year-old girl who wants Lupin to teach her to be a thief. But what is her tie to the treasure and the mysterious girl Misa, a girl who cannot die? The secrets behind the treasure reach back even into Lupin's past; will the Blood Seal be opened?!
| 23 | "The Travels of Marco Polo ~Another Page~ (Note: Tōhō Kenbunroku is the Japanese title for what is known in English as The Travels of Marco Polo, thus a more literal translation would be "Record of Observations of the East ~Another Page~".) / The Secret Page of Marco Polo"; Transliteration: "Tōhō Kenbunroku – Anazā Pēji" (Japanese: 東方見聞録 〜アナザーページ〜) | Hajime Kamegaki | Katsurō Hidaka | 13.2% | November 2, 2012 | July 30, 2024 |
The special revolves around a long-lost page from Marco Polo and Rustichello da Pisa's The Travels of Marco Polo. Theo Argento, a professor who found this missing page, has been murdered, and Lupin is suspected as the killer. As Lupin is being chased by the police, he receives unexpected help from Argento's granddaughter Lisa.
| 24 | "Princess of the Breeze – The Skyward Hidden City / Princess of the Breeze"; Transliteration: "Purinsesu obu za Burizu – Kakusareta Kūchū Toshi" (Japanese: princess of the breeze 〜隠された空中都市〜) | Takaomi Kawasaki | Shigeru Morita; Touko Machida; Katsurō Hidaka | 12.8% | November 15, 2013 | July 30, 2024 |
After a chaotic heist, Lupin and Jigen find themselves becoming caretakers of a baby boy, while a young sky pirate called Yutika is after their loot. Yutika is an inhabitant of the city-state of Shahalta, which has recently fallen to a shady minister. Soon, Lupin's gang and Yutika join forces to uncover one of Shahalta's greatest treasures, facing off against both Shahaltan authorities and Zenigata.
| 25 | "Italian Game"; Transliteration: "Itarian Gēmu" (Japanese: イタリアン・ゲーム) | Kazuhide Tomonaga | Yūya Takahashi | 10.7% | January 8, 2016 | September 24, 2024 |
Rebecca Rossellini has been kidnapped! Born to a prominent family of the Republic of San Marino, the young CEO of the Rossellini conglomerate operates the largest hotel chain in Italy. Rebecca is surrounded by no shortage of celebrity gossip. However, an enthusiastic fan named Pietro stages a kidnapping and train robbery. In fact, a mysterious man is pulling the strings behind the scenes. He calls himself the Masked Earl, and before Rebecca was kidnapped he issued a challenge to Lupin, suggesting a contest: to see who can first obtain the famous inheritance of the Count of Cagliostro. The paths of British MI-6 Agent Nyx, Italian Police Chief Sergio, paparazzo Salo chasing Rebecca, and the Count's descendant Earl Gaspare all cross. Who really is the Masked Earl? And will Lupin be able to overcome the trap set by the Masked Earl?
| 26 | "Goodbye Partner"; Transliteration: "Gubbai Pātonā" (Japanese: グッバイ・パートナー) | Jun Kawagoe | Takehiko Hata | 8.7% | January 25, 2019 | June 30, 2020 |
Inspector Zenigata is arrested on suspicion of helping Lupin commit his crimes. To prove they are not colluding, Lupin is manipulated into agreeing to steal a special diamond called the Time Crystal which is also the key to control a quantum supercomputer. Lupin successfully steals the diamond, but he is betrayed by Jigen who delivers the gem to the very wealthy and ambitious Roy Forest. Meanwhile, Alisa Cartwright, a promising young entrant in a Chopin Competition, is kidnapped in London by Forest's henchmen. Jigen delivers the crystal to Forest so he can operate his quantum supercomputer, but they discover it is a fake. Lupin and Goemon break Zenigata out of jail to help them catch Jigen and they track him to Forest's headquarters. Forest forces Lupin to deliver the original crystal or he will kill Alisa, who it is inferred may be Jigen's daughter. Alisa is forced to play Chopin's music on his original piano which activates the crystal and Forest takes control of the world's financial systems. However, Lupin discovers the musical key to taking control of the supercomputer and thwarts Roy's plan for world domination. The A.I. within the supercomputer suddenly goes rogue and begins warring with the American government, attempting to rid all trace of their involvement with the computer and Roy. Alisa and Fujiko play piano to distract it while Lupin and Jigen blow it up from the outside. With the threat eliminated, the crew goes their separate ways as Fujiko takes Alisa to her competition, while Jigen kills Roy.
| 27 | "Prison of the Past"; Transliteration: "Purizun obu za Pasuto" (Japanese: プリズン・オブ・ザ・パスト) | Hatsuki Tsuji | Shatner Nishida | 10.1% | November 29, 2019 | July 26, 2022 |
A world famous "Robin Hood" criminal known as Corbett Finnegan is sentenced to death after spending several years locked up in a high security prison in the Kingdom of Dorrente. Lupin and the gang plan to infiltrate the prison and break him out in hopes of claiming his vast treasure. Many skillful thieves from around the world gather to get to him first, but are each unable to break through the prison's defences. Lupin manages to reach Finnegan and prepare to bust out, but is quickly betrayed by the man who is revealed to be in cahoots with the prison staff, arresting Jigen while Lupin and Goemon escape. Goemon is saved by a swordsman named Verte who asks for advice on how to be a more proficient and confident fighter. Lupin re-enters the prison and, after reuniting with Fujiko, learns that not only is the King of Dorrente under lockdown in the prison, but that it's all used as a front for weapons and black market dealings, selling off valuable prisoners, with Finnegan providing extra funding with his treasure. The gang, plus Zenigata and Yatagarasu, fight their way through the armed men to confront Finnegan and the prison's warden, Lorensa. Figuring she's an unwilling participant, Lupin tries to convince Lorensa to trust them, but she's forced by Finnegan to activate a device that completely seals the prison in, forcing everyone to flee or risk being crushed. The gang with Lorensa manage to rescue the King, where she reveals that the Prince, who is actually Verte, is alive. Overhearing this, Finnegan heads to deal with him, having undergone plastic surgery to look like the Prince so he can take over the Kingdom. After a chase and eventual showdown, Verte saves Lorensa and neutralizes Finnegan, stating his desire to become the next King. Verte and Lorensa thank the thieves for their help as they depart. Sometime later, Lupin, Jigen, and Goemon claim some of the seemingly lost treasure, while Fujiko and the other thieves take the rest for themselves.

== Production notes ==
- While recording Voyage to Danger in 1993, Lupin's voice actor, Yasuo Yamada, took a sudden illness, and his standing became unstable. By the last part of the recording, Yasuo recorded his voice while he was in a chair. Yamada went on to reprise the role one last time in Dragon of Doom the following year. However, his health continued to decline during its recording. He died of a brain hemorrhage in 1995, at the age of 62. Kanichi Kurita took over the role of Lupin that same year.
- 2007's The Elusiveness of the Fog aired as a tribute to the 40th anniversary of the Lupin III manga. Just as the OVA Return of Pycal brought back an old villain in recognition of the 30th anniversary of the anime, the character of Mamou had previously appeared in both a story in the original Lupin III manga and the thirteenth episode of the first anime series. He is treated in this special as if Lupin's gang had never met him before.
- 2011's Blood Seal of the Eternal Mermaid brought new voice actors for Fujiko, Zenigata and Goemon for the first time in 16 years. Miyuki Sawashiro took over Fujiko from Eiko Masuyama, Daisuke Namikawa took over Goemon from Makio Inoue, and Kōichi Yamadera took over Zenigata from Gorō Naya. They have continued to voice the characters in all other media since.
- 2016's Italian Game is a spinoff of Lupin the 3rd Part IV: The Italian Adventure. In addition to around 40 minutes of original content, it reuses scenes from three episodes of that series – "The Wedding of Lupin the Third", "0.2% Chance of Survival", and "Nonstop Rendezvous".

== Reception ==
The Lupin III television specials released by Funimation have received reviews varying from positive to mixed. The most well-received seems to be Island of Assassins, with Chris Beveridge of Mania.com describing it as "the best non-TV Lupin experience ... since The Castle of Cagliostro", Missed by a Dollar received an eight out of ten rating by IGN's Jeremy Mullin, who stated it starts off as seemingly a simple heist film, but turns out to have plenty of twists. The least well-received of Funimation's releases is Secret of the Twilight Gemini, which received mixed reviews due to the animation and its B movie-style plot. Mania.com gave 2002's Episode 0: The First Contact an A+ and hailed it as the best TV special made to date.

In 500 Essential Anime Movies Helen McCarthy called Liberty her personal favourite of the Lupin TV specials. She describes it as "light, funny and entertaining" and "terrific entertainment".

== See also ==
- Lupin III
- List of Lupin III Part I episodes
- List of Lupin III Part II episodes
- List of Lupin III Part III episodes
- List of Lupin III: The Woman Called Fujiko Mine episodes
- List of Lupin III Part IV episodes
- List of Lupin III Part 5 episodes
- List of Lupin III Part 6 episodes
