= Lupin III (character) =

Fictional character created by Monkey Punch

Arsène Lupin III
- Lupin III character
- Lupin drawn by Monkey Punch
- First appearance: Lupin III chapter 1: "The Dashing Entrance of Lupin III", August 10, 1967 (Weekly Manga Action)
- Created by: Monkey Punch
- Portrayed by: Yūki Meguro (1974) (Note: Strange Psychokinetic Strategy); Shun Oguri (2014) (Note: Lupin the 3rd)
- Voiced by (Japanese): Yasuo Yamada (1971–94); Kanichi Kurita (1995–present); Other: Nachi Nozawa (1969) (Note: Pilot Film (CinemaScope version)); Taichirō Hirokawa (1970) (Note: Pilot Film (TV version)); Toshio Furukawa (1987) (Note: The Fuma Conspiracy); Keiichi Nanba (1998) (Note: Lupin III D2 Manga); Tasuku Hatanaka (2022) (Note: Lupin Zero)
- Voiced by (English): Tony Oliver (2002–2007; 2017–present); Other: Tom Clark (Frontier Enterprises/Toho International: 1979) (Note: The Mystery of Mamo); Bob Bergen (Streamline Pictures: 1992–95) (Note: The Castle of Cagliostro, Lupin the Third Part II eps. 145 and 155, The Mystery of Mamo); Robin Robertson (AnimEigo: 1995) (Note: The Fuma Conspiracy); William Dufris (Manga Entertainment: 1996) (Note: The Mystery of Mamo, Bye Bye, Lady Liberty); David Hayter (Animaze/Manga Entertainment: 2000) (Note: The Castle of Cagliostro); Sonny Strait (Funimation: 2002–13) (Note: The Secret of Twilight Gemini, The Pursuit of Harimao's Treasure, Dragon of Doom, Voyage to Danger, Farewell to Nostradamus, Tokyo Crisis, The Columbus Files, Dead or Alive, Island of Assassins, Missed by a Dollar, The Woman Called Fujiko Mine); Keith Silverstein (Bang Zoom! Entertainment/Discotek Media: 2014–26) (Note: Jigen's Gravestone, Goemon's Blood Spray, Fujiko's Lie, Zenigata and the Two Lupins, The Immortal Bloodline)

In-universe information
- Aliases: Cliff (Note: Used in Cliff Hanger); The Wolf (Note: Used in Streamline Pictures' dubs of The Castle of Cagliostro and Lupin the Third Part II eps. 145 and 155); Rupan III (Note: Used in AnimEigo's dub of The Fuma Conspiracy and subtitled print of Legend of the Gold of Babylon); Wolf III (Note: Used in Manga Entertainment's dubs of The Mystery of Mamo and Bye Bye, Lady Liberty)
- Nickname: Boss (Note: Used by Daisuke Jigen in various dubs produced by Streamline Pictures and Funimation)
- Occupation: Gentleman thief Spy; Vigilante
- Weapon: Walther P38
- Spouses: Rebecca Rossellini (Note: In Part IV and Part V only)
- Significant other: Fujiko Mine
- Relatives: Arsène Lupin I (grandfather); Lupin II (father); Lupin Jr. (son)
- Nationality: French-Japanese

Lupin III (Japanese: ルパン三世, Hepburn: Rupan Sansei), referred to in some English adaptations as Arsène Lupin III, (Note: "Arsène" is not considered to be part of the character's name in Japanese media.) is a fictional character and the protagonist of the manga series Lupin the Third, which was created by Kazuhiko Katō (known as Monkey Punch) and debuted in Weekly Manga Action on August 10, 1967.

Lupin is the grandson of fictional gentleman thief Arsène Lupin, created by Maurice Leblanc. Acknowledged across the globe as the world's number one thief, Lupin is a master of disguise and deduction, marksmanship, and inventor of numerous handy gadgets. His fun-loving, foolhardy incongruity covers a brilliant mind always extemporizing and re-evaluating. As such, he has been responsible for heists no right-minded individual would believe possible. While occasionally arrested and jailed, typically by his ICPO nemesis Inspector Koichi Zenigata, he always succeeds in escaping unharmed. The original manga differs significantly compared to the family-friendly anime incarnations through its explicit depictions of sex and violence, with Lupin's character also differing as a result. As one example, he and his famous gang, beautiful Fujiko Mine, cool triggerman Daisuke Jigen and incomparable samurai Goemon Ishikawa XIII, occasionally try to kill each other in the manga version, but are depicted as more of a team in various anime productions.

== Conception and creation ==
The aim of Lupin III was to produce a comedy adventure series that reflected the traits of Leblanc's Arsène Lupin character. Originally, the intention was to keep the blood ties between the two fictional characters secret. However, Monkey Punch was convinced by others not to do so. He combined elements of Arsène Lupin with James Bond to develop the character of Lupin III and made him a "carefree fellow".

In the original manga, Lupin and his team typically work individually for their own goals. Monkey Punch explained it is only in the anime that they frequently operate together, suspecting some unwritten rule that all five main characters have to appear in every episode. He believed that Lupin and Fujiko were similar to the characters of D'Artagnan and Milady de Winter, and described them as "Not necessarily lovers, not necessarily husband and wife, but more just having fun as man and woman with each other". Inspector Zenigata was conceived as Lupin's archrival to create a "human Tom and Jerry".

Monkey Punch described the appeal of drawing Lupin coming from the character being able to go anywhere without obstacles and being able to do whatever he wants, whenever he wants. However, this is contrasted by the appeal of Zenigata's strict personality. Monkey Punch said that he believed the Lupin III story could never end but that if he had to, both Zenigata and Lupin would end up as equals. They would either both fail, both win or both get very old.

=== Name ===
Monkey Punch did not gain permission to use the Arsène Lupin name and, at the time, Japan did not enforce trade copyrights. By the time Leblanc's estate launched legal action in Japan, the name was considered to have entered into common use. However, this was not the case in North America and Europe, and several foreign releases of Lupin III media were obliged to drop the Lupin III title; the character himself was renamed to "Wolf" or "Rupan". In France, the series was known as Edgar, Detective Cambrioleur (Edgar, Detective Burglar) with Lupin himself renamed "Edgar de la Cambriole" (Edgar of Burglary). In 2012, Leblanc's original Arsène Lupin entered the public domain in France due to 70 years passing since his death in 1941, and is in the public domain for any country that enforces the rule of the shorter term.

In Japanese media, the character is referred to by the mononym "Lupin III", excluding a first name even when other characters are given their full names. Translation notes written in 2015 offer that Japan does not use western generational "Jr." or "III" naming conventions that necessitate sharing the first name, further asserting that "official [Japanese] animation dialogue and comic text never explicitly call him 'Arsène Lupin the Third.'" The first name "Arsène" would later appear briefly written on a wanted poster shown in a 2018 episode of Part V, though dialogue throughout the show continued to only identify the character as "Lupin III". The name "Arsène Lupin III" continues to occasionally appear in English localizations.

== Characterization ==
=== Appearance ===
Lupin as seen in Episode 0: The First Contact.

Lupin III has black (or occasionally dark brown) hair with what is variously depicted as cut short with a widow's peak or plastered flat with a V-shaped bang. His trademark sideburns extend from ear to nearly the chin.

Lupin typically dresses fashionably, wearing a brightly colored, single-breasted, two-button blazer with notch lapels worn unbuttoned, a button-up dress shirt, a flat end necktie with a silver tie clip, a leather ratchet belt with a silver buckle, cropped dress pants that expose ankle socks with thin black stripes, and lace-up cap toe dress boots. Though exclusively red in the manga, in animation his jackets are various colors which are often used to color-code the TV series (green for Part I, red for Part II, pink for Part III, blue for Part IV, light blue for Part V, and teal for Part VI).

=== Personality ===
In Monkey Punch's original manga, Lupin is cocky, quite crude, and for the most part remorseless. He is very much the ladies' man, often using them for his own gains, and is not beyond forcing himself upon women who resist his advances. Mike Toole of Anime News Network referred to the character as a "rough, drunken, lecherous crook." This is in stark contrast to his better-known anime self, who although a skilled thief, occasionally comes off as a chivalrous goofball who enjoys helping those less fortunate than he. Furthermore, Lupin often takes it upon himself and his gang to stop criminals engaged in more violent crimes and leave them for Zenigata to arrest. In the anime, while he fancies himself a Casanova, his actual success with women is erratic, appearing to fluctuate with the writer.

Even though his gang's loyalty has been an issue, with Fujiko willing to betray and cohort Goemon promising to eventually kill him, Lupin will still drop everything to come to their aid in a helpless moment; further the team would rather face torture than to betray Lupin (or he betray them) to a third party. This rule of loyalty extends as well to Inspector Zenigata, whom Lupin considers a respected friend and opposition. The Inspector reciprocates this regard and out of gratitude has vowed never to attempt to kill Lupin. Lupin's vendetta against the Tarantula Gang in In Memory of the Walther P-38 was partly settling of past betrayal and mostly vengeful payback for their shooting and nearly killing Zenigata.

It seems Lupin loves to steal more than actually having the treasure he sought. Lupin relishes more in the challenge of stealing and, as long as he succeeds in the heist, is usually not that upset when he ends up empty-handed; there have been times he has lost the object or intentionally thrown it away. There have also been times when Lupin stole an object only to give it to someone else, such as if it rightfully belonged to them or they needed it more than he did.

When not involved in criminal activities, Lupin usually spends his time dating beautiful girls, fishing, race car driving, attending formal dinners, playing pool, casino gambling, and participating in café society. His favorite foods seem to be mostly French cuisine, sushi, and seafood; when on a job he may settle with ramen noodles. In Lupin the 3rd Part 5, he is shown with an affection for galettes. He also smokes cigarettes and occasionally cigars and kreteks; in the manga, he's seen smoking a briar pipe. His preferred cigarette is the famous French brand Gitanes. Lupin is a celebrated race car driver, competing in several international events when time allows. He's also a skilled sleight of hand artist who loves to befuddle his opponents with various gimmicks: i.e., a cigarette which explodes into confetti, a gun with a spring-loaded boxing glove that clobbers the shooter, and bubble gum that becomes plastique after brief chewing.

=== Skills ===
Lupin combines average physical power with remarkable speed, flexibility, and refined manual dexterity. A gifted impersonator, he can accurately duplicate any subject's voice, appearance, and costume after minimal observation, often deceiving intimate acquaintances. His slender frame facilitates impersonating larger individuals by concealing gear within padded clothing, most famously when disguising himself as Inspector Zenigata. In addition to high situational awareness and quick instincts, Lupin exhibits broad erudition across languages, history, and the natural sciences.

Lupin favors the long outdated Walther P38 as his principal firearm. He is shown to be an excellent marksman, having on at least one occasion fired directly into the barrel of another gun, although not quite on a par with Jigen.

Despite the criminal nature of his activities, Lupin has a strict code that he follows in order to not taint his reputation. Lupin dislikes killing and takes care to use non lethal means to achieve his goals. When Lupin believes he has an illness causing him to become a compulsive killer he asks Jigen to kill him to save the lives of any potential victims. While killing is against his nature, he is willing to fire upon any enemy who threatens his friends or allies.

Lupin is a driver, motorcyclist and pilot. His favorite automobiles are either the Mercedes-Benz SSK or a souped up 1965 Fiat 500 F, most famously seen in Castle of Cagliostro, as well as the Alfa Romeo 6C 1750. In the case of the SSK, one of the rarest cars in the world, one problem or another seems to cause the car's destruction in virtually every episode it is featured, though it always reappears undamaged soon after.

Lupin is an escape artist, said to be capable of cracking any safe or escaping from shackles in moments. He can even use his restraints to entrap his would-be captor before making his departure. Seemingly prepared for all contingencies, he can break free of confinement even when surrounded.

In spite of his facade of reckless childlike antics, i.e., taunts, silly faces, and leaving notes of his next caper, Lupin's brilliance for tactics and originality belies any underestimations his behavior may have implied. In the Lupin the 3rd vs. Detective Conan special, not only did he figure out Conan was far more intelligent than he appeared, but had also discerned his identity as Shinichi Kudo.

=== Background ===
Lupin's ethnic origins have been occasionally specified as half-Japanese and half-French, befitting his claimed heritage as grandson of Frenchman Arsène Lupin. In the first TV series, episode 13 ("Beware the Time Machine!"), Lupin impersonates a feudal Japanese ancestor of his, claiming he would like to marry a girl by the name of Mylene Lupin from France someday.

In the 2008 OVA Green vs. Red, a dossier held by Zenigata indicates his place of birth as "unknown". Numerous Part I and Part II episodes make it clear that the famed French thief is indeed his grandfather, with some stories having flashbacks to the top-hatted ancestor having been somehow involved in Lupin's current heists. As well, Lupin often speaks of both his grandfather and his father, both of whom were thieves. He occasionally quotes his grandfather's advice and has attempted to complete or repeat heists attempted by his ancestors with good or bad luck.

== Actors ==
=== Animation ===
==== Japanese ====
Lupin III was first voiced by Taichirō Hirokawa in the CinemaScope version of the 1969 pilot film for the first anime, while Nachi Nozawa voiced him in the pilot's TV version. However, Yasuo Yamada was given the role when the first anime was actually produced (1971–72) and continued to voice Lupin until his death in 1995, with one exception. Due to budget concerns, TMS decided not to employ the regular voice cast for the 1987 original video animation The Fuma Conspiracy, with Toshio Furukawa voicing Lupin. Kanichi Kurita took over the role after Yamada's death and he continues to voice Lupin III to this day. In the Lupin Zero prequel ONA series, the teenaged Lupin is voiced by Tasuku Hatanaka.

==== English ====
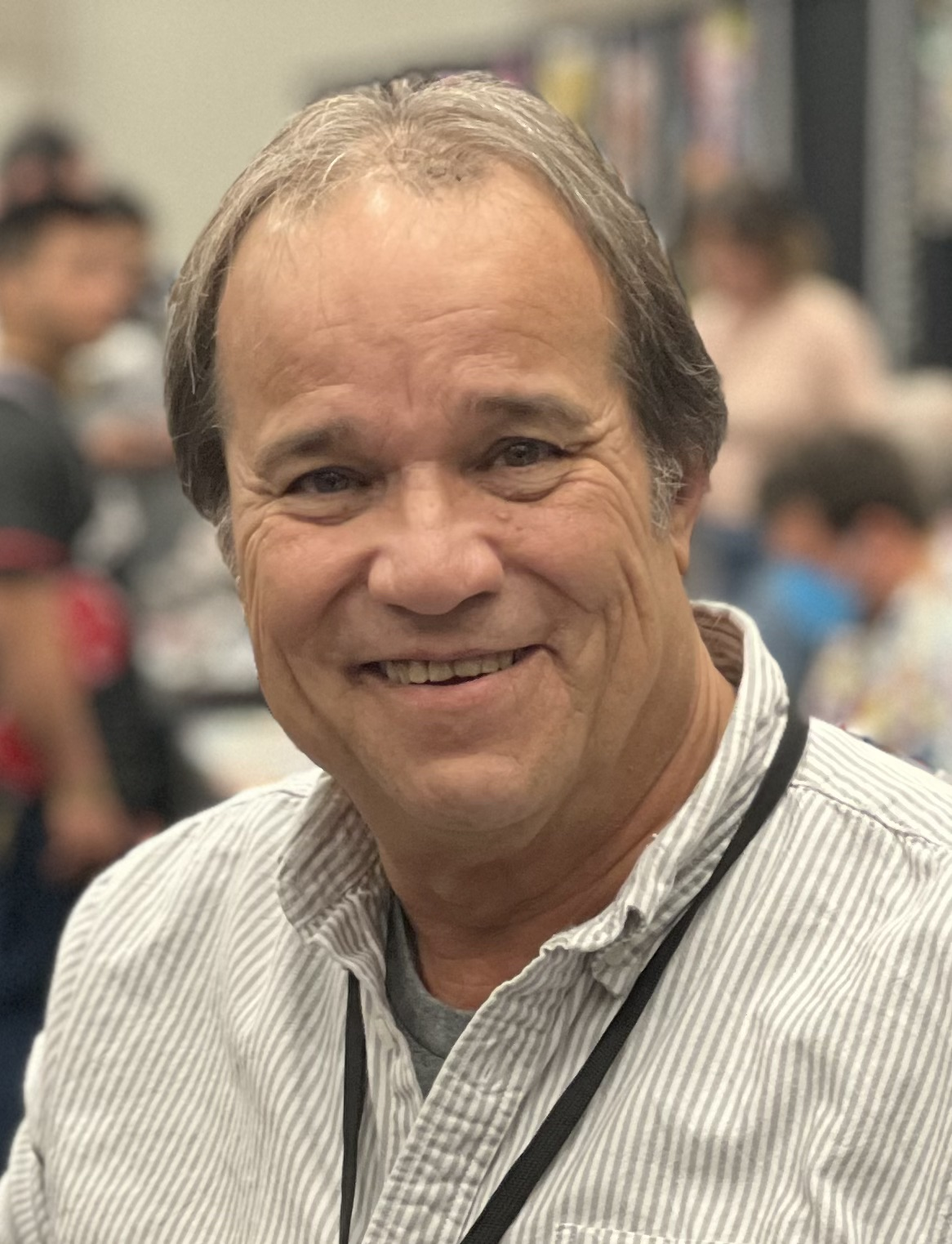
Tony Oliver has been Lupin III's primary voice actor in English since 2017.

Due to a lack of localization credits on any known prints, Lupin's English voice actor in the 1979 Toho/Frontier Enterprises dub of The Mystery of Mamo remained unverified until 2018, when a chance discovery by fans revealed the voice actor to be Tom Clark. From 1991 to 1995, Bob Bergen voiced Lupin in Streamline Pictures' dubs of The Castle of Cagliostro (in which the character was renamed "The Wolf" to avoid legal complications with Maurice Leblanc's estate), episodes 145 and 155 of the second anime (collectively released as Lupin III: Tales of the Wolf and later Lupin III's Greatest Capers) and The Mystery of Mamo. For AnimEigo's 1995 release of The Fuma Conspiracy, Lupin, named "Rupan" in the dub, was voiced by Robin Robertson. In Manga Entertainment's 1996 dubs of The Mystery of Mamo and Bye Bye, Lady Liberty (retitled Secret of Mamo and Goodbye Lady Liberty respectively) for the UK market, Bill Dufris provided Lupin's voice, where the character was renamed "Wolf III". In Manga's 2000 dub of The Castle of Cagliostro, produced in cooperation with Animaze, David Hayter provides Lupin's voice; due to the non-union nature of the project, Hayter was initially credited as "Sean Barker". Hayter was also involved in the production of Discotek Media's re-release of the film, and re-voiced several of his lines for a "family-friendly" edit of the Animaze/Manga dub produced exclusively for Discotek.

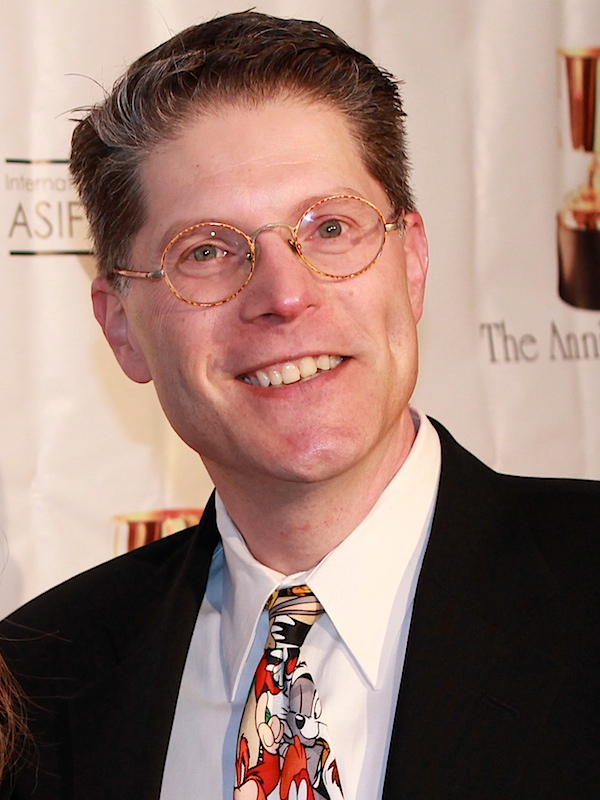
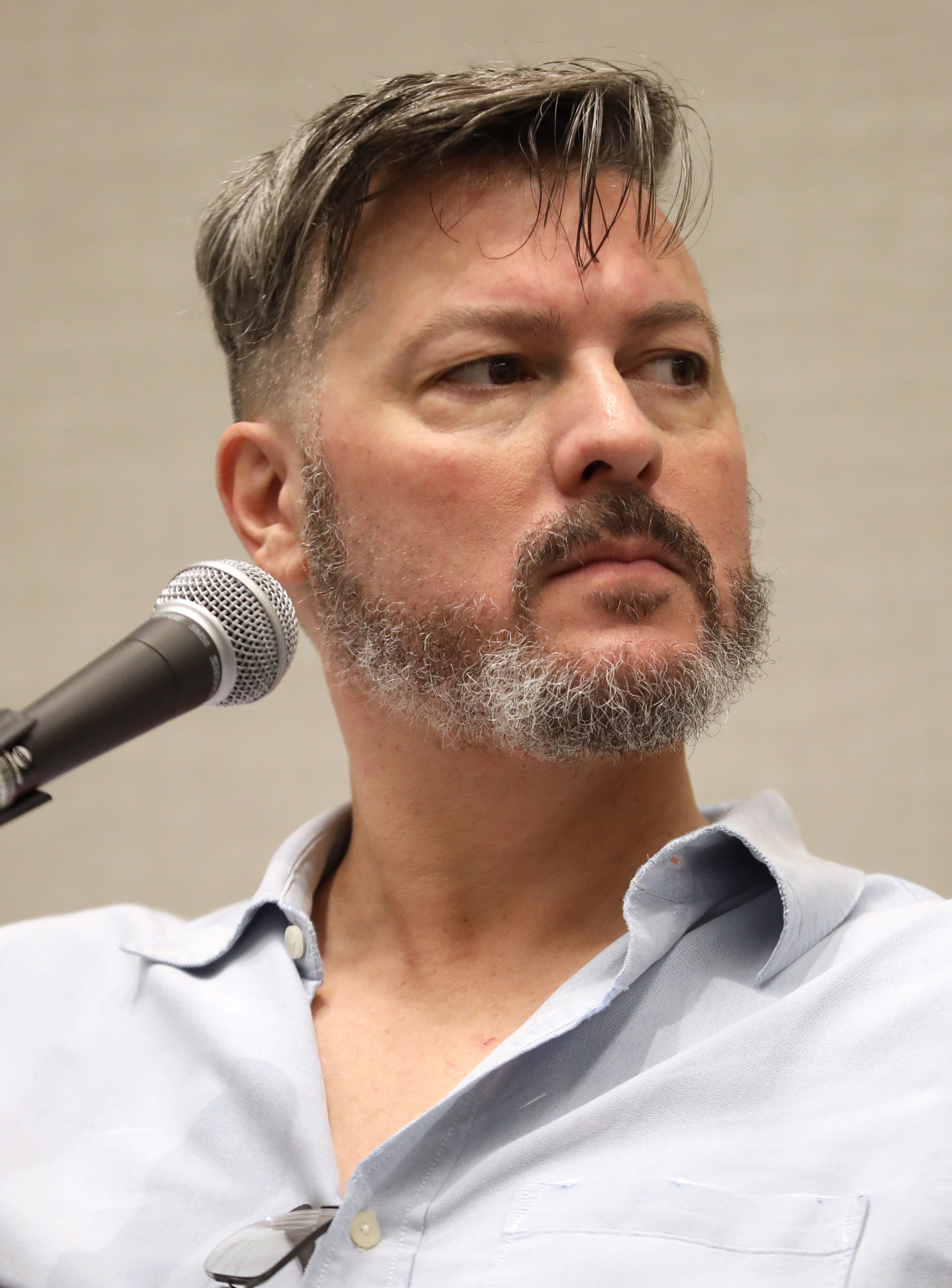
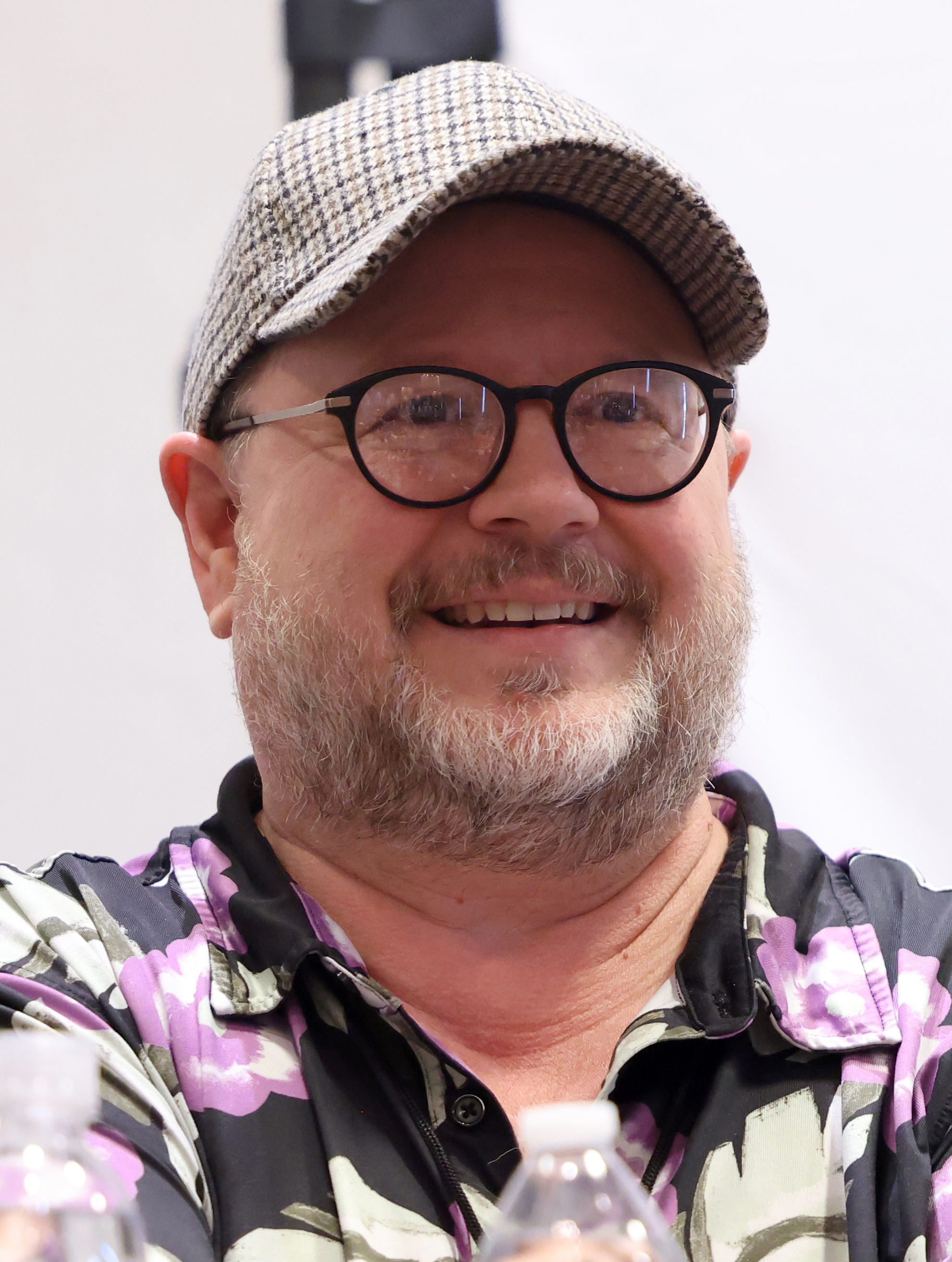
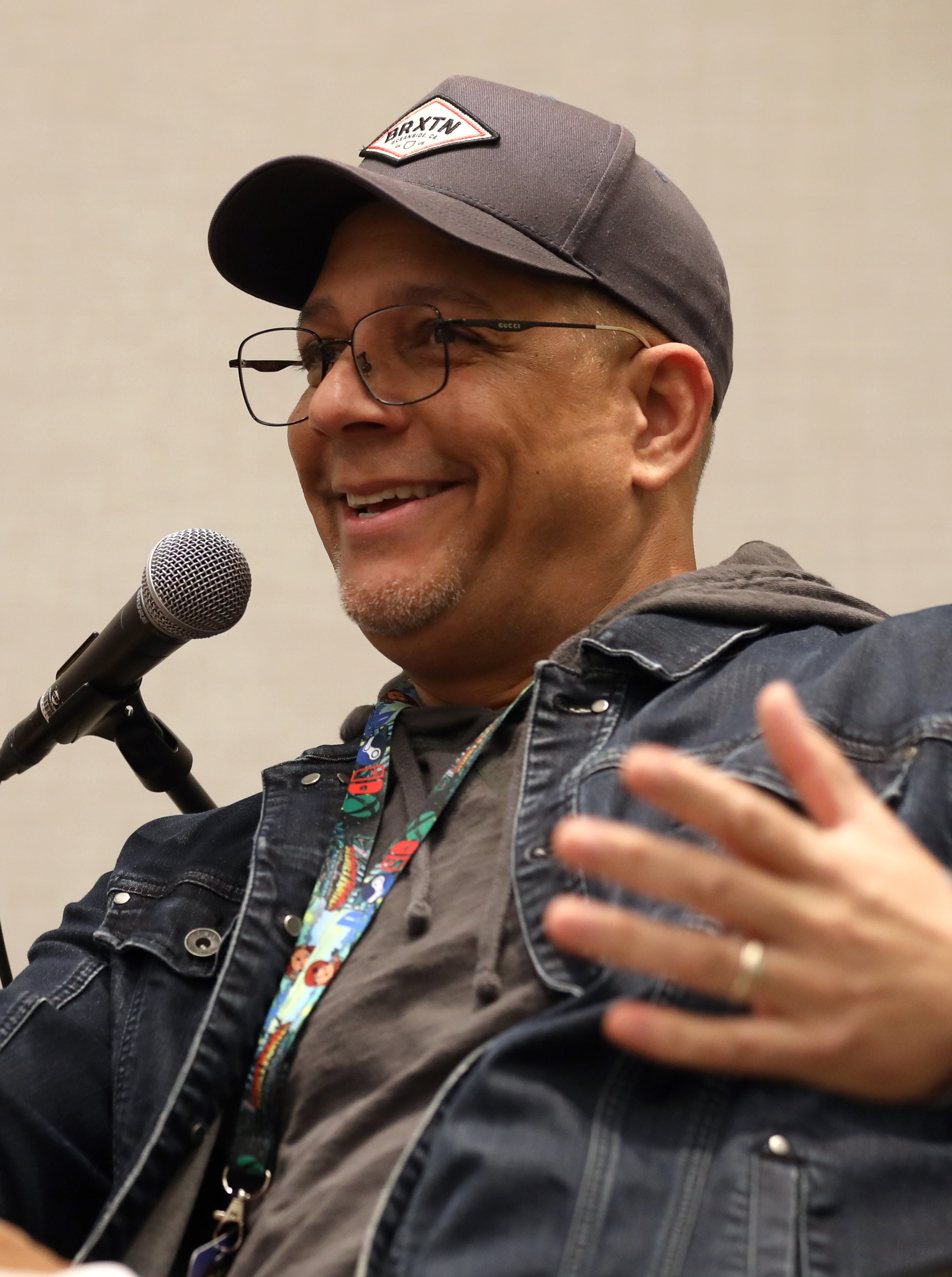
Bob Bergen, David Hayter, Sonny Strait, and Keith Silverstein have all voiced Lupin III in various English dubs of the franchise.

Sonny Strait voiced Lupin in Funimation Entertainment's dubs of several TV specials and theatrical films between 2002 and 2005, and in their 2013 dub of The Woman Called Fujiko Mine. Keith Silverstein voices the character in the Bang Zoom! Entertainment/Discotek dubs for the Lupin the IIIrd films that serve as a "continuation spin-off" of the series.

Tony Oliver voiced Lupin in the Phuuz dub of the second anime and The Mystery of Mamo for Pioneer/Geneon, as well as the video game Treasure of the Sorcerer King, between 2002 and 2007. Beginning with the Discotek dub of Part IV, Oliver reprised the role (alongside several Part II co-stars) and has continued to be the primary voice actor for the character across animated shows and films.

=== Live-action ===
Lupin was portrayed by Yūki Meguro in the 1974 film and by Shun Oguri in the 2014 film. In the 2015 musical adaptation of Lupin III performed by the all-female troupe Takarazuka Revue, Lupin was portrayed by Seina Sagiri.

== Appearances in other media ==
Lupin makes an appearance as a guest character in the 2012 game Girls RPG Cinderelife developed by Level-5 for the Nintendo 3DS. The character has also been used in television advertising for motorcycles, gasoline, razors, fast food companies, etc.

== Reception ==
Allen Divers of Anime News Network (ANN) called Lupin "one of the most recognized figures in Japan" with many homages and references in other series. Similarly, Crunchyroll's Kara Dennison said that even if someone has not seen a Lupin III title, they have "almost certainly experienced something either inspired by or paying tribute to him and his gang." Lupin was voted the eighth most iconic anime hero by Mania.com. IGN ranked Lupin as the fifteenth best anime character of all time in 2009, placing him on the 16th spot in 2014.

After completing his involvement with the Lupin III franchise in 1980, Hayao Miyazaki wrote an article in Animage where he discussed his view of the series and the character. He stated that Lupin was "truly a character of his era" but that as the franchise progressed he had been overtaken by the real world. Despite this, Miyazaki still thought fondly of Lupin's early days. For the video game Persona 5, its creative team originally asked themselves how a character like Lupin III might win appeal in modern society.

Anime director and voice actor Shinichi Watanabe is known for dressing like Lupin in his daily life, a trait which is extended to his avatar character, Nabeshin, in Excel Saga and other shows he has directed like Puni Puni Poemy and Nerima Daikon Brothers.
