= Doug Erholtz =

American voice actor

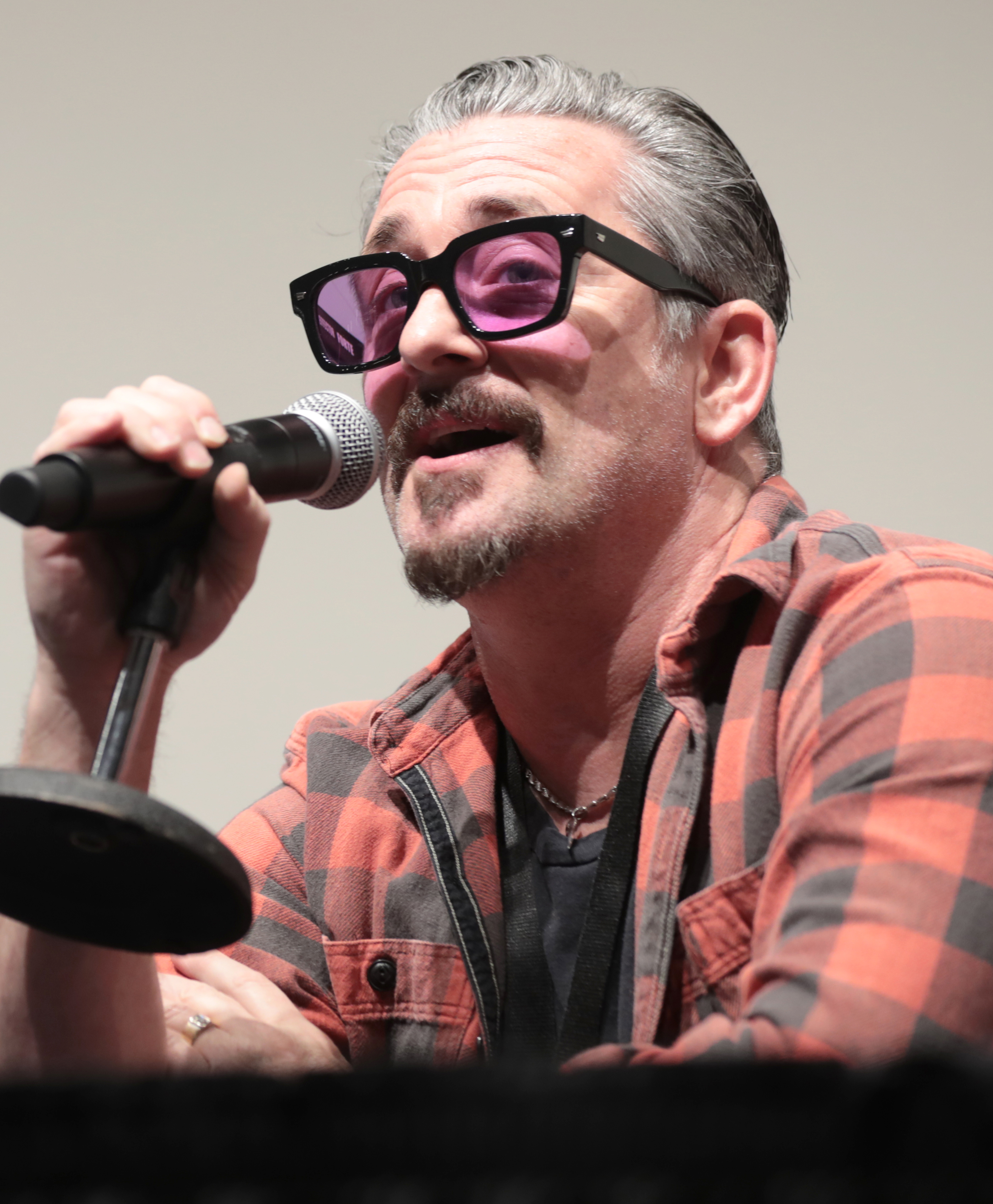
- Erholtz in 2023
- Occupation: Voice actor
- Years active: 1996–present

Doug Erholtz is an American voice actor. He is known for his performances as Inspector Zenigata in Lupin the Third, Gin Ichimaru in Bleach, TK Takaishi in Digimon Adventure 02, Squall Leonhart in the Final Fantasy and Kingdom Hearts series, Asuma Sarutobi and Kankuro in Naruto, Jean Pierre Polnareff in JoJo's Bizarre Adventure: Stardust Crusaders and JoJo's Bizarre Adventure: Golden Wind, and Hamrio Musica in Rave Master.

== Roles ==
=== Anime ===
- Battle B-Daman – Joe, Biarce
- BlazBlue Alter Memory – Hazama
- Bleach – Gin Ichimaru, Kisuke Urahara (Eps. 231-366)
- Blue Exorcist – Kaoru Tsubaki
- Bobobo-bo Bo-bobo – Nightmare
- Buso Renkin – Shinobu Negoro
- Code Geass: Lelouch of the Rebellion – Yoshida
- Demon Slayer: Kimetsu no Yaiba - Kasugai Crow
- Devilman Crybaby - Koji Nagasaki
- Digimon Adventure – MetalSeadramon, SkullGreymon, Susumu Kamiya, Jim Kido, Deramon, Unimon, Chuumon
- Digimon Adventure 02 – T.K. Takaishi, BigMamemon, SkullGreymon, Jim Kido, Mr. Motomiya
- Digimon Fusion – SkullMeramon (Ep. 7-9), Garbagemon, Hagurumon, Tyutyumon, Golemon, Bulbmon
- Dinozaurs – Taki
- Dorohedoro – Chōta
- Dragon Ball Super (Toonami Asia) – Whis
- Drifting Dragons - Berko
- Duel Masters – Hakuoh (Season 2 and 3)
- Durarara!! series – Ran Izumii (Season 1), Max Sandshelt
- Fate/stay night – Shinji Matou
- Fate/Zero – Kayneth El-Melloi Archibald
- Flint the Time Detective – Merlock Holmes, Lucas (Ep. 3), Bubblegum, Young Auguste Rodin (Ep. 9)
- Gankutsuou: The Count of Monte Cristo – Lucien Debray
- Great Teacher Onizuka – Suguru Teshigawara
- Grenadier – Teppa Aizen
- Gurren Lagann – Iraak Coega
- IGPX – Zanak Strauss
- I Luv Halloween – Finch
- JoJo's Bizarre Adventure: Stardust Crusaders – Jean Pierre Polnareff
- JoJo's Bizarre Adventure: Golden Wind – Jean Pierre Polnareff
- Kashimashi: Girl Meets Girl – Asuta Soro
- Kyou Kara Maou! – Conrad Weller
- Lupin the Third Part IV: The Italian Adventure - Inspector Zenigata
- Lupin the Third Part V - Inspector Zenigata
- Lupin the 3rd Part 6 - Inspector Zenigata
- Magi: The Labyrinth of Magic – Zagan
- MÄR – Leno, Ian
- March Comes In like a Lion – Issa Matsumoto
- Mazinkaiser SKL – Ryo Magami
- Mobile Suit Gundam: Iron-Blooded Orphans – Akihiro Altland
- Mobile Suit Gundam: The Origin – Ortega
- Monster – Otto Heckel, Hebert Knaup
- Nodame Cantabile – Shinchi Chiaki
- Naruto – Asuma Sarutobi, Kagari
- Naruto: Shippuden – Asuma Sarutobi, Kankuro (Five Kage Summit Arc +), Katazu (Ep. 181)
- Nura: Rise of the Yokai Clan – Kuromaru, Kyuso
- Patlabor – Asuma Shinohara (Bandai Visual USA dub)
- Rave Master – Hamrio Musica
- Saiyuki Reload – God
- Samurai Champloo – Umanosuke (Eps. 24-26)
- Scrapped Princess – Kidaf Gillot the Silencer
- SD Gundam Force – Captain Gundam, Grappler Gouf
- Sword Art Online – Kuradeel (Eps. 8, 10)
- The Prince of Tennis – Takeshi Momoshiro, Kippei Tachibana
- The Seven Deadly Sins – Slader
- Ultra Maniac – Jun Kawanakajima, Shinnouske, The Prince
- Zegapain – Chris Avenir

=== Western animation ===
- Care Bears: Welcome to Care-a-Lot – Grumpy Bear, Champ Bear, Beastly
- El Chavo – Quico, Mr. Raymond, additional voices
- Enchantimals: Tales from Everwilde – Sprint, Flap
- The Grossery Gang – Faked Beanz, Bad Beef Can, Sloppy Soup Tin, Mop Head, Feather Duster
- Hot Wheels Monster Trucks Camp Crush- Race Ace
- The Snow Queen – Orm

=== Anime films ===
- Berserk: Golden Age Arc – Corkus
- Bleach: Fade to Black – Kisuke Urahara
- Digimon: The Movie – T.K. Takaishi
- Digimon: Revenge of Diaboromon – T.K. Takaishi
- Digimon: Island of Lost Digimon – Dinohyumon
- Digimon Adventure tri. – Daigo Nishijima, Koromon
- Digimon Adventure (standalone dub) - Susumu Kamiya
- Digimon Adventure 02: Digimon Hurricane Touchdown!! / Transcendent Evolution! The Golden Digimentals (standalone dub) - T.K. Takaishi
- Expelled from Paradise – Alonzo Percy
- Fate/stay night: Unlimited Blade Works – Shinji Matou
- Gantz:O – Hachiro Oka
- Kite Liberator – Koichi Doi
- Kingsglaive: Final Fantasy XV – Castle Guards
- Lu over the Wall - Esojima
- Lupin the Third: Blood Seal of the Eternal Mermaid - Inspector Zenigata
- Lupin the Third: Legend of the Gold of Babylon - Inspector Zenigata
- Lupin the Third: Goodbye Partner - Inspector Zenigata
- Lupin III: The First - Inspector Zenigata, Additional Voices
- Naruto Shippuden the Movie: The Will of Fire – Asuma Sarutobi, Kankuro
- Naruto Shippuden the Movie: The Lost Tower – Young Asuma Sarutobi
- Patlabor: The Movie – Asuma Shinohara
- Patlabor 2: The Movie – Asuma Shinohara
- Paprika – Doctor Morio Osanai
- Redline – Titan
- Team Hot Wheels: Build the Epic Race – Greasebeard

=== Film ===
- Happily N'Ever After 2 – McDowner, Pied Piper, Simple Simon
- The Flintstones & WWE: Stone Age SmackDown! – Additional voices

=== Video games ===
- .hack//G.U. vol.2//Reminisce – Hiiragi
- .hack//G.U. vol.3//Redemption – Hiiragi
- .hack//INFECTION – Balmung
- Bleach – Gin Ichimaru, Kisuke Urahara
- BlazBlue series – Hazama, Yuuki Terumi (BlazBlue: Continuum Shift Extend onward, replacing Erik Davies)
- Catherine: Full Body – Justin Bailey
- Detective Pikachu Returns – Pablo Millan
- Dissidia Final Fantasy – Squall Leonhart
- Dissidia 012 Final Fantasy – Squall Leonhart
- Dissidia Final Fantasy NT – Squall Leonhart
- Final Fantasy: Explorers – Squall Leonhart
- Fire Emblem: Three Houses – Acheron
- Kingdom Hearts II – Squall Leonhart
- Kingdom Hearts III Re Mind - Squall Leonhart
- Like a Dragon Gaiden: The Man Who Erased His Name - Additional voices
- Mobius Final Fantasy - Squall Leonhart
- Naruto series – Asuma Sarutobi, Kankuro
- Rogue Galaxy – Young Dorgengoa
- Romancing SaGa 2: Revenge of the Seven – Vicar
- Sengoku Basara: Samurai Heroes - Additional voices (warriors)
- Seven Samurai 20XX - Tatsuma
- Shenmue III – Additional Cast
- Shin Megami Tensei IV - Mastema
- Shin Megami Tensei V: Vengeance - Mastema
- Star Ocean: Second Evolution – Bowman Jeane
- Street Fighter series – Vega
- Unicorn Overlord – Anton, Rui, Mercenaries (Type C), additional voices
- World of Final Fantasy – Squall Leonhart
- Xenoblade Chronicles X – Frye
- Xenoblade Chronicles X: Definitive Edition – Frye, avatar, additional voices
- Xenosaga Episode III: Also sprach Zarathustra – U-DO

=== Other ===
- Adventures in Voice Acting
- Violetta – Pablo Galindo (English dub)
- Deer Squad – Sir Steel (English dub)
