= Lupin the 3rd: Treasure of the Sorcerer King =

2002 video game

- North American cover art
- Developer: Banpresto
- Publishers: JP: Banpresto; NA: Bandai; EU: 505 Games
- Producers: Shintaro Miura; Gentaro Mizukami; Takeshi Kagawa
- Programmers: Seishiro Mizukami; Kenji Yoshino; Yuki Mibu; Kenya Shimazaki; Kenichiro Ueda
- Artists: Toshimitsu Kobayashi; Satoshi Hirayama
- Writers: Shunsuke Ozawa; Hiroshi Tominaga; Shinji Yoneda
- Composer: Yuji Ohno
- Series: Lupin III
- Platform: PlayStation 2
- Release: JP: November 28, 2002; JP: November 6, 2003 (Best for the Family); NA: February 10, 2004; ITA: June 16, 2005
- Genres: Action, Stealth
- Mode: Single-player

Lupin the 3rd: Treasure of the Sorcerer King (ルパン三世 魔術王の遺産, Rupan Sansei Majutsu-Ou no Isan; "Lupin the Third: The Legacy of the Magic King") is a 2002 stealth/action video game by Banpresto. It has an original story based on the manga and media franchise Lupin III. The gameplay relies heavily on stealth and the use of various disguises and is displayed from a third-person perspective.

== Plot ==
Lupin III and his gang head to Eastern Europe to steal a pair of antique pitchers which will supposedly show the way to the legendary treasure of King Randolph II. The mysterious Theodore Hannewald is planning to display them at an exhibition at his ancestral castle in Goldengasse (a European city heavily inspired by Prague), and hires Inspector Koichi Zenigata of ICPO to protect the vases, which are put on a train. Also on the train is Teresa Faust, the owner of the pitchers, who seems to be troubled by something.

Lupin successfully infiltrates the train and steals the pitchers, but he discovers that they are fakes. Lupin and his partners Daisuke Jigen and Goemon Ishikawa XIII travel to Goldengasse, which has an old castle where the real pitchers are located. While trying to find a way to sneak into the castle, Lupin ends up making friends with the local black market merchants.

Once inside, Lupin is tricked into looking for fakes, but he manages to hide before being seen. Lupin, knowing that Theodore does not know he knows that the pitchers on display are fake, leaves and attempts another break-in. Jigen and Goemon set out to find information of the whereabouts of the real pitchers. Jigen and Goemon run into a group of mercenaries led by a man named Clyde and his two partners. It is revealed later that Theodore hired them to kill Lupin and his gang. While exploring the castle, Lupin runs into Fujiko Mine, who is also looking for the pitchers. However, Lupin tricks Fujiko by taking an ID card from her and continues with his search. Fujiko however uses a spare card and continues her search as well.

Just before midnight, Theodore waits for Lupin to show and steal the fake pitchers. After not showing up, Theodore assumes Lupin has given up, but then as he turns around there are signs in the glass pillars showing the word "fake" and Lupin announces that he has found the real pitchers.

After getting the pitchers and extra help from Teresa, Lupin and his gang find an old part of the castle that goes underground. Once down in this secret path, stone monsters begin to move and attack them. The gang then gets split up by a ceiling collapse, but are eventually reunited. After exploring further, they run into Theodore again, who reveals he had Teresa on the train to use her to get the Book of Magic, because he claims he is the rightful heir to a group of ancient wizards. After burning Lupin with his staff and sending him deeper into the castle, Theodore orders his men to capture Teresa. After waking up from his fall, Lupin meets an old wizard who is hundreds of years old, and reveals that the pitchers are key to finding a book of mystical power. He gives Lupin special ammo to defeat the stone monsters and Theodore. At the same time, Goemon and Jigen both run into the mercenaries again.

On Jigen and Goemon's end, they run into and kill the mercenaries, who attempt a last-ditch effort to kill them. They later escape and regroup with Lupin a bit later. Teresa and Fujiko are able to regroup safely.

Theodore later captures Teresa and takes her hostage, and then tortures Fujiko offscreen. Lupin finds Fujiko mortally wounded after the fact, and brings her to the wizard, who informs Lupin of a means to revive her with a resurrection spell. The wizard uses the spell, but before seeing if it was successful, Lupin leaves to take off and save Teresa. After catching up to Theodore, he reveals his plan to unleash a massive stone soldier called Talos and conquer the world. After the colossal construct is activated, Lupin tosses a special bullet to Jigen, in which the gunslinger uses it to shoot Theodore, mortally wounding him.

After using the special bullets, Talos is destroyed. Theodore barely manages to get to his feet, but is soon crushed under rubble from the killer statue and the damage from the battle weakens the underground ruins, causing the heroes to flee. As they attempt to escape, a fireball destroys the exit, cast by a hideous monster of stone with Theodore's face and hand sticking out of it. Teresa claims Theodore cast a spell on himself before the rubble landed on him, but died before it became complete, fusing his body, staff and the Book with the fallen rubble. Armed with the last of the wizards’ bullets, Lupin finally kills Theodore but the tunnel collapses from the shockwave and destroys the entire above castle.

Afterwards, Teresa awakens at the train station from the beginning of the game. There, it is revealed that Fujiko was successfully revived and is in disguise reading a newspaper covering the collapse, then she takes off again. Zenigata shows up and reveals he was able to save Teresa at the price of breaking his arm, but it is believed Lupin and his gang were killed in the cave-in. Zenigata, however, believes that Lupin is still out there and says farewell to Teresa to continue the chase.

In the end, it is revealed that Lupin and the rest of his gang survive. They say goodbye and leave Goldengasse behind. Teresa learned to let go of her past, and her father, who at the start of the game, was why she worked with Theodore believing he would help her put the pitchers in a museum in his memorial.

== Characters ==
For the most part players are given the role of Lupin. In two other levels, players are given the option of playing as either Jigen or Goemon. Within these levels the paths and results differ only slightly. In one level, the player must play a shoot 'em up style mini-game featuring an SD version of Fujiko.

- Arsène Lupin III: The Master thief, constantly being pursued by his ICPO nemesis, Inspector Zenigata. In Japanese, Lupin was voiced by Kanichi Kurita, while in English, he was voiced by Tony Oliver.
- Daisuke Jigen: A master of arms. He carries his Smith & Wesson 45 Magnum wherever he goes. In Japanese, Jigen was voiced by Kiyoshi Kobayashi, while in English, he was voiced by Richard Epcar.
- Goemon Ishikawa XIII: A descendant of the Ishikawa family, a group of thieves. In Japanese, Goemon was voiced by Makio Inoue, while in English, he was voiced by Lex Lang.
- Fujiko Mine: A cunning thief and Lupin's love interest. In Japanese, Fujiko was voiced by Eiko Masuyama, while in English, she was voiced by Michelle Ruff.
- Teresa Faust: A character who is the center of the entire game. In Japanese, Teresa was voiced by Masayo Kurata, while in English, she was voiced by Kari Wahlgren.
- Theodore Hannewald: A Castle Curator who has a hidden agenda. In Japanese, Theodore was voiced by Naoki Bandō, while in English, he was voiced by Paul St. Peter.
- Inspector Koichi Zenigata: Chases Lupin wherever he goes. He is determined to capture him. In Japanese, Zenigata was voiced by Gorō Naya, while in English, he was voiced by Dan Lorge.

== Music ==
Lupin the Third: The Legacy of the Magic King Original Soundtrack

Soundtrack album by Yuji Ohno
- Released: December 21, 2002
- Genre: Anime/Video game
- Length: 58:07
- Language: Japanese
- Label: VAP

The game's soundtrack was composed of compositions by Yuji Ohno, who has done most of the music for the anime series. The opening theme for the game was 1979 version of the Lupin the 3rd theme, and the closing theme was a song called "Yakusoku". The soundtrack was released as Lupin the Third: The Legacy of the Magic King Original Soundtrack (ルパン三世 魔術王の遺産, Rupan Sansei Majutsu-Ou no Isan) by Vap on December 21, 2002.

=== Track listing ===
1. ルパン三世のテーマ'79
  Rupan Sansei no Tēma '79/Theme of Lupin the Third '79
2. ゴルデンガッセ#1 列車内～街
  Gorudengasse #Wan Ressha nai~gai/Goldengasse #1
3. ゴルデンガッセ#2
  Gorudengasse #2/Goldengasse #2
4. ハンネヴァルト城・組曲/北翼・南翼館～大聖堂～旧王宮～博物館
  Hannevaruto jō Kumikyoku/Kita Tsubasa Minami Tsubasa kan Daiseidō~Kyūōkyū~Hakubutsukan/Castle Suite: North Wing South Wing Building, Sanctuary, Old Royal Palace, Museum
5. 地下迷宮
  Chika Meikyū/Under Ground Labyrinth
6. 青い洞窟
  Aoi Dōkutsu/Blue Cave
7. アンダーグラウンド
  Andā Guraundo/Under Ground
8. 脱出
  Dasshutsu/Escape
9. ゲームオーバー
  Gēmu Ōbā/Game Over
10. バトル!#1
  Batoru!# 1/Battle!# 1
11. バトル!#2
  Batoru!# 2/Battle!# 2
12. 銭形・ハスダル・不二子
  Zenigata Hasudaru Fujiko
13. ヘルデンリートシュロス～バー「カフカ」～作戦の後
  Herudenrītoshurosu bā "Kafuka" Sakusen no Nochi/Heldenliedhemp Palms: Bar "Kafka" After a Strategy
14. 絶望
  Zetsubō/Despair
15. プレッシャー
  Puresshā/Pressure
16. それぞれの思い
  Sorezore no Omoi/Of Each Thought
17. petit不二子
  Petit Fujiko
18. 約束
  Yakusoku/Promise
19. 約束[インストゥルメンタル]
  Yakusoku [Insuturumentaru]/Promise [Instrumental]

== Reception ==
Reception

Aggregate score
Aggregator	Score
Metacritic	67/100

Review scores
Publication	Score
1Up.com	B−
Electronic Gaming Monthly	5.67/10 (Note: Three critics of Electronic Gaming Monthly gave the game each a score of 5.5/10, 4.5/10, and 7/10.)
Game Informer	5.75/10
GameSpot	6/10
GameSpy	3/5
GameZone	6.5/10
IGN	6.7/10
Official U.S. PlayStation Magazine	3.5/5
PlayStation: The Official Magazine	5/10
X-Play	3/5

The game received "average" reviews according to the review aggregation website Metacritic. It was praised for its spot-on portrayal of the series as well as its graphical and audio design, but was criticized for uneven, clunky gameplay and less-than-stellar enemy AI. Alex Navarro of GameSpot praised the game for its voice acting, soundtrack, and level of faithfulness to the source material, but criticized it for its poor graphics and weak enemy AI. Rice Burner of GamePro said, "Despite the minor gripes about the camera and the game's A.I., Treasure of the Sorcerer King is a good gaming experience and an exhilarating encounter for any fan of Lupin the Third [sic]." (Note: GamePro gave the game two 3.5/5 scores for graphics and control, and two 4/5 scores for sound and fun factor.)

Game Informer listed the game as one of the best video games based on a manga or anime series.

== See also ==
- List of Lupin III video games
