= Dan Lorge =

American voice actor (born 1962)

- Occupations: Voice actor producer director writer
- Years active: 1992–present
- Agent: Tru Talent Agency
- Spouse: Holly Annette Clark

Dan Lorge is an American voice actor. He currently teaches acting at Take 2 Performers Studio in Reno, Nevada.

== Selected filmography ==
=== Anime ===
- Lupin the 3rd Part II (1977–1980) – Inspector Koichi Zenigata
- Fist of the North Star (1984–1987) – Additional Voices
- Rurouni Kenshin (1996–1998) – Henya Kariwa, Additional Voices (Media Blasters Dub)
- Trigun (1998) – Barfly 3 (ep. 1), Descartes Lackey 3 (ep. 1), Townsman (ep. 3), Bus Driver (ep. 9), Additional Voices
- Digimon Adventure (1999) – Shellmon, Monzaemon, Warumonzaemon, Additional Voices
- The Big O (1999–2003) – MP Boat Patrol (ep. 5)
- Digimon Adventure 02 (2000) – Chikara Hida, Seadramon, Deputymon, Additional Voices
- Shinzo (2000) – Hyper Mushra, Katai
- Cyborg 009 (2001–2002) – Zanbarusu (ep. 9), Additional Voices

=== OVAs and Specials ===
- The Guyver: Bio-Booster Armor (1989–1992) – Derzerb, Yōhei Onuma, Zerbebuth (ep. 3), Takasato (ep. 4)
- Giant Robo: The Animation (1992–1998) – Professor Shizuma (Animaze Dub)

=== Anime films ===
- Lupin the 3rd: The Mystery of Mamo (1978) – Inspector Koichi Zenigata (Geneon Dub)
- Akira (1988) – Councilman 1 (Animaze Dub)

=== Video games ===
- Lupin the 3rd: Treasure of the Sorcerer King (2004) - Inspector Koichi Zenigata
- Digimon World Data Squad (2004) - Gaomon, MachGaogamon, MirageGaogamon
