= Cliff Hanger (video game) =

1983 LaserDisc-based arcade game

- Arcade flyer
- Developers: Stern Electronics; Tokyo Movie Shinsha
- Publisher: Stern Electronics
- Designers: Paul M. Rubenstein; Bob Kowalski; Jon Michael Hogan; Edward J. March Jr.
- Programmers: Paul M. Rubenstein; Bob Kowalski; Jon Michael Hogan; Edward J. March Jr.
- Artists: Hayao Miyazaki; (The Castle of Cagliostro); Sōji Yoshikawa; (The Mystery of Mamo)
- Series: Lupin III
- Platform: Arcade
- Release: NA: September 1983
- Genre: Interactive movie
- Modes: Single-player, multiplayer

Cliff Hanger is a LaserDisc video game that was released by Stern Electronics in 1983. It is an interactive movie, using animation from two Lupin III films, and requires the player to respond to quick time events to progress the storyline. Most of the game's footage is from The Castle of Cagliostro (1979), with additional footage from The Mystery of Mamo (1978).

== Plot ==
The game's plot is based loosely on The Castle of Cagliostro and follows the eponymous Cliff as he attempts to rescue Clarissa from the evil Count Draco (in some materials called "Dreyco" and in the instruction manual "Dragoe"), who wants to marry her. Cliff is aided in his quest by Jeff (Dan Dunn) and Samurai.

== Development ==
The game was originally edited at Associated Audio Visual, Inc., in Evanston, Illinois. Jack Bornoff, was the editor, Paul Rubenstein, was editorial supervisor. The segments from The Mystery of Mamo use the original Toho / Frontier Enterprises English dub, while the segments from The Castle of Cagliostro use an English dub that was created for the game by an unknown voice cast.

Cliff Hanger uses a feedback loop to read frame details from the game LaserDisc. This prevents the LaserDisc and gameplay from ever going out of sync.

The original version of Cliff Hanger shows footage from The Mystery of Mamo of Cliff being hanged if the player fails a quick time event. According to the instruction manual, a setting on the game cabinet's logic board would allow the individual owners/operators the option of not playing the sequence if they so chose.

== Legacy ==
The game was considered for inclusion on the American Blu-ray release of The Castle of Cagliostro by Discotek Media, but when it became apparent that the original contracts for the game were lost, it was left off the release.

The television game show Starcade featured a special episode where rather than playing the usual three games, the contestants played three rounds of Cliff Hanger. The winner of the show, Mark Walsh, won a Cliff Hanger cabinet.

In the film The Goonies (1985), the character Chunk is playing Cliff Hanger when he sees the Fratelli Brothers driving past while being chased by the police.

Cliff Hanger helped expose many Americans in the 1980s to Lupin the Third, Hayao Miyazaki, and Japanese anime in general, as it was released in the United States before any Lupin III or Miyazaki anime productions had officially been released theatrically or on home video.

== See also ==
- List of LaserDisc games
