= David Povall =

American actor

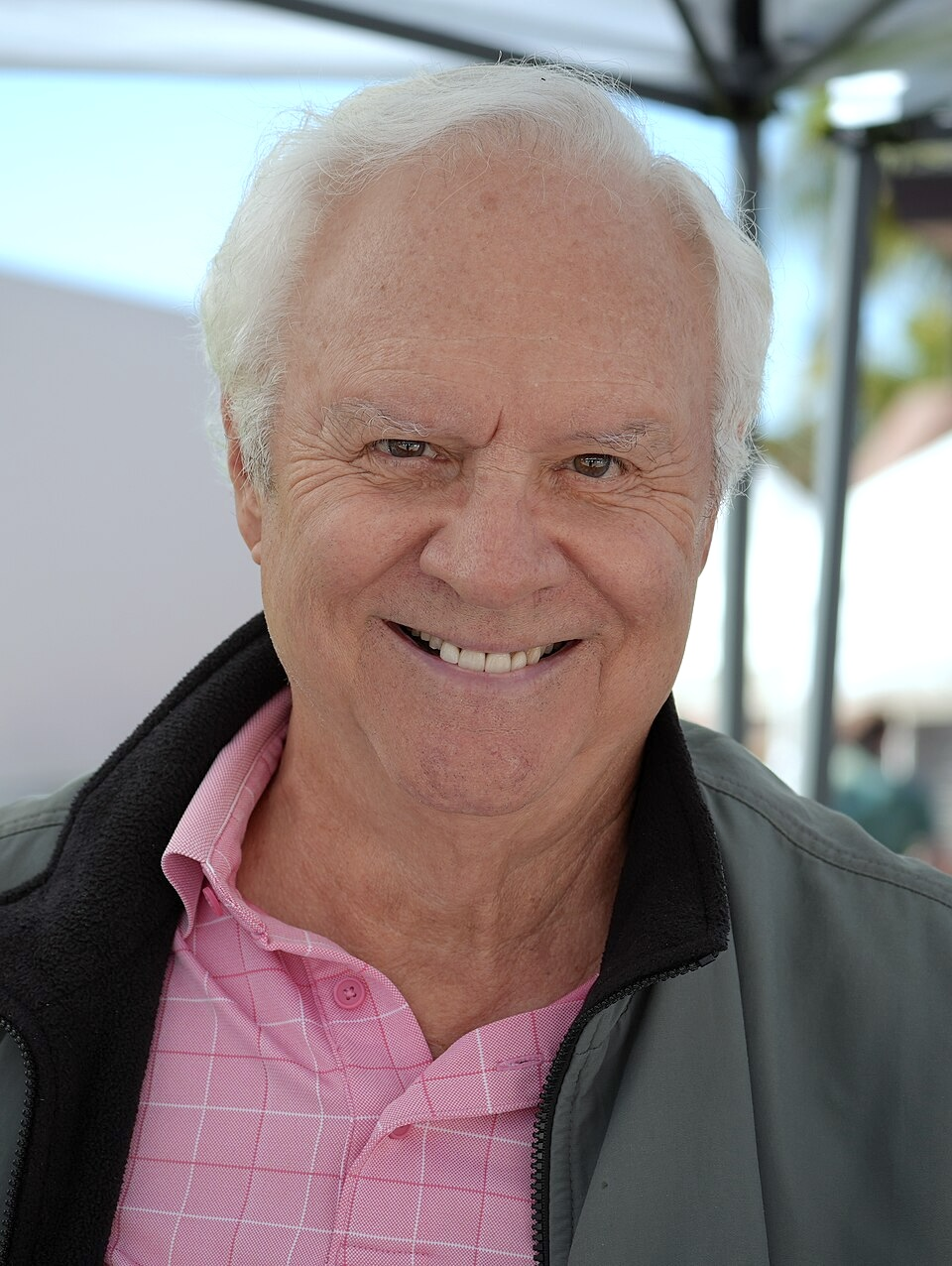
- Povall at the 2025 San Diego Writers Festival.
- Born: David Stuart Povall; June 21, 1947 (age 79); San Antonio, Texas, U.S.
- Other name: David Estuardo
- Occupations: Actor, voice actor, writer

David Stuart Povall (born June 21, 1947) is an American writer and former actor and voice actor. He was credited in many of his acting roles as David Estuardo.

== Life and career ==
Povall was born in San Antonio, Texas in 1947, and raised there and in Denver and Mexico City. Fluent in Spanish and Nahuatl, he began his acting career in Mexico in 1969, under the stage name David Estuardo ('Estuardo' being the Spanish form of his middle name 'Stuart').

Between 1969 and 1986, he appeared in over 20 Mexican films and television series, alongside the likes of Jorge Rivero, Ignacio López Tarso, Julissa, Claudio Brook, Pedro Armendáriz Jr., Sara García, and Irán Eory. He also had a co-starring role in the Clint Eastwood/Shirley MacLaine Western Two Mules for Sister Sara (1970), and played John the Apostle in the Biblical epic Jesús, nuestro Señor (1971).

In the late 1980s, Povall returned to the United States and began a second career as a voice actor, primarily in English-language dubs of anime.

Povall currently works as a writer, and is married to his Mexican wife Victoria.

== Filmography ==
=== Live-action ===
- The Arrival - Additional voices
- Counting Days - Rev. John Santos
- The Ring - Girl's father

=== Anime ===
- The Castle of Cagliostro - Inspector Koichi Zenigata (MGM version)
- The Professional: Golgo 13 - F. Garvin
- 3×3 Eyes - Benares; Demon
- Wicked City - Hodgkins (USA dub)
- Dirty Pair: Flight 005 Conspiracy - Additional voices
- Crying Freeman Volume 3: Shades of Death Part 2 - Goken Ishida; Abductor
- Tales of the Wolf - Inspector Koichi Zenigata
- Megazone 23 - Newscaster; Sensor operator
- Lupin III: The Mystery of Mamo - Inspector Koichi Zenigata

=== TV series ===
- Phantom 2040 - Additional voices
- Team Knight Rider - Computer Guy
- The Ex-List - Mr. Crane

=== Video games ===
- Total Annihilation: Kingdoms - Unit #5 (voice)
