= Phuuz entertainment =

American entertainment company

phuuz entertainment
- Industry: Entertainment
- Founded: January 2002
- Headquarters: Universal City, California, U.S.
- Key people: Ken Duer, President; Jay Francis, Executive VP Strategic and Business Development; Eric Radomski, Executive VP Creative Development
- Website: www.phuuz.com

phuuz entertainment (pronounced "Fuse") is a media company based in Universal City, California, mainly known for its ADR production for animated television shows and video games. Its president is former Warner Bros. Animation executive Ken Duer, with animation producer Eric Radomski, and former Film Roman manager Jay Francis serving as Co-founders.

The company has undergone name changes and re-incorporations. It originally started as Fuse Entertainment, Inc., which was later changed to phuuz entertainment inc. phuuz has worked with Warner Bros. Animation, Warner Bros. Home Video, TV Asahi, Toei Animation, Banpresto, TMS Entertainment, MTV, Film Roman, C2 Pictures, Geneon Entertainment, Mutant Enemy Productions, 20th Century Fox Television, Paramount Home Entertainment, Kids' WB, and Cartoon Network.

== Work ==
=== ADR Production ===
- Crayon Shin-chan - Second English dub, only aired in Europe and Latin America
- Doraemon - 1979 series, pitch pilot only
- Lupin the 3rd - 1978 series, first 104 episodes
- Lupin the 3rd: The Secret of Mamo
- Lupin the 3rd: Treasure of the Sorcerer King
- Bobobo-bo Bo-bobo
- Viewtiful Joe

=== ADR consulting ===
- Noein - To Your Other Self - For Media Concepts

=== Distribution consulting ===
- Minimax
- TMS - For North American and European markets.

=== Logo creation ===
- Bandai Entertainment

=== Production consulting ===
- Sprite Entertainment
- Zoom Kitty

=== Supervising production ===
- Xiaolin Showdown - by Eric Radomski
- Toei Animation - Promotions.
- Toy Warrior

=== Sales representative ===
- Elysium
