= 1989 in anime =

The events of 1989 in anime.The first year of the Heisei era.

== Accolades ==
- Animation Film Award: Kiki's Delivery Service

== Releases ==
Released	Title	Type	Director	Studio	Ref
January 15	Peter Pan: The Animated Series	TV series	Yoshio Kuroda	Nippon Animation	
January 24	Bombing Circuit Romance Twin	OVA film	Osamu Sekida	Lifework	
January 27	Goku Midnight Eye	OVA series	Yoshiaki Kawajiri	Madhouse, Inc.	
February 4	Cynical Hysterie Hour: Henshin!	Film	Kiriko Kubo	Studio Gallop	
February 4	Manga Hajimete Omoshiro Juku	TV series	Hirochika Muraishi	Dax International	
February 22	Riding Bean	OVA film	Yasuo Hasegawa	AIC, Artmic	
February 28	Be-Boy Kidnapp'n Idol	OVA film	Kenichi Yatagai	AIC, Youmex	
March 3	Cipher the Video	OVA film	Tsuneo Tominaga	Magic Bus	
March 11	Doraemon: Nobita and the Birth of Japan	Film	Tsutomu Shibayama	Shin-Ei Animation	
March 11	The Five Star Stories	Film	Kazuo Yamazaki	Sunrise	
March 11	Dorami-chan: Mini-Dora SOS!!!	Film	Makoto Moriwaki	Shin-Ei Animation	
March 11	Soreike! Anpanman: Kirakira Boshi no Namida	Film	Akinori Nagaoka	Tokyo Movie Shinsha	
March 11	The Three Musketeers Anime: Aramis' Adventure	Film	Kunihiko Yuyama	Gallop	
March 11	Utsunomiko	Film	Kenji Yoshida	Nippon Animation	
March 11	Venus Wars	Film	Yoshikazu Yasuhiko	Triangle Staff	
March 13	Himitsu no Akko-chan	Film	Hiroki Shibata	Toei Animation	
March 14	Transformers: Victory	TV series	Yoshikata Nitta	Toei Animation	
March 17	Yankee Reppu-tai	OVA series	Tetsuro Imazawa	Toei Animation	
March 18	Osomatsu-kun: Suika no Hoshi Kara Konnichiwa zansu!	Film	Akira Shigino	Studio Pierrot	
March 18	Warriors of the Final Holy Battle	Film	Masayuki Akehi	Toei Animation	
March 21	Rhea Gall Force	Film	Katsuhito Akiyama	AIC, Artmic	
March 25	Mobile Suit Gundam 0080: War in the Pocket	OVA series	Fumihiko Takayama	Sunrise	
April 1	Bye Bye, Lady Liberty	TV special	Osamu Dezaki	Tokyo Movie Shinsha	
April 2	Miracle Giants Dome-kun	TV series	Takashi Watanabe	Gallop	
April 3	Alfred J. Kwak	TV series	Hiroshi Saitō	Telescreen Japan Inc, Teleimage Inc, Visual '80	
April 6	Legend of Heavenly Sphere Shurato	TV series	Toshihiko Nishikubo	Tatsunoko Production	
April 7	Blue Blink	TV series	Osamu Tezuka	Tezuka Productions	
April 7	Madö King Granzört	TV series	Shūji Iuchi	Sunrise	
April 8	Cynical Hysterie Hour: Yoru wa Tanoshii	Film	Kiriko Kubo	Studio Gallop	
April 8	Hengen Taima Yakō Karura Mau! Nara Onryō Emaki	Film	Takaaki Ishiyama	Ginga Teikoku	
April 15	Ranma ½	TV series	Tomomi Mochizuki, Tsutomu Shibayama	Studio Deen	
April 16	Akuma-kun	TV series	Junichi Sato	Toei Animation	
April 26	Dragon Ball Z	TV series	Daisuke Nishio, Shigeyasu Yamauchi	Toei Animation	
May 23	Beat Shot!!	OVA film	Takashi Akimoto	Studio Fantasia, C.MOON, Gainax, Magic Bus	
May 27	Wrath of the Ninja	Film	Osamu Yamazaki	J.C. Staff	
June 17	City Hunter: .357 Magnum	Film	Kenji Kodama	Sunrise	
June 24	Cynical Hysterie Hour: Utakata no Uta	Film	Kiriko Kubo	Studio Gallop	
July 15	Akuma-kun	Film	Junichi Sato	Toei Animation	
July 15	Dragon Ball Z: Dead Zone	Film	Daisuke Nishio	Toei Animation	
July 15	Little Nemo: Adventures in Slumberland	Film	Masami Hata, William Hurtz	Tokyo Movie Shinsha	
July 15	Himitsu no Akko-chan: Umi da! Obake da!! Natsu Matsuri	Film	Hiroki Shibata	Toei Animation	
July 15	Mobile Suit SD Gundam's Counterattack	Short film	Shinji Takamatsu, Tetsuro Amino	Sunrise	
July 15	Patlabor: The Movie	Film	Mamoru Oshii	Studio Deen	
July 16	Blue Sonnet	OVA series	Takeyuki Kanda	Mushi Production, Tatsunoko Production	
July 21	ARIEL Visual	OVA series	Junichi Watanabe	Animate, J.C.Staff	
July 21	The Adventures of Hutch the Honeybee	TV series	Iku Suzuki	Tatsunoko Production	
July 22	My Melody's Little Red Riding Hood	Film	Hidemi Kubo	Sanrio, Grouper Productions	
July 22	Hello Kitty's Cinderella	Film	Tameo Kohanawa	Sanrio, Grouper Productions	
July 22	Kiki and Lala's Blue Bird	Film	Masami Hata	Sanrio, Grouper Productions	
July 25	Riki-Oh: The Walls of Hell	OVA film	Satoshi Dezaki	Trans Arts	
July 29	Kiki's Delivery Service	Film	Hayao Miyazaki	Studio Ghibli	
August 3	Amada Anime Series: Super Mario Bros.	OVA series	Shinichirō Ueda	Studio Junio	
August 4	Kankara Sanshin	Film	Osamu Kobayashi	Tokyo Animation Film	
August 16	Cinderella Express	OVA film	Kouichi Sasaki, Michio Mishima, Nanako Shimazaki	Nichiei Agency, Nihon Eizō, Studio Look	
August 27	Tezuka Osamu Monogatari: Boku wa Son Gokû	TV special	Masami Hata, Rintaro	Tezuka Productions	
September 1	Angel Cop	OVA series	Ichirō Itano	Soei Shinsha	
September 16	Borgman: The Final Battle	Film	Kiyoshi Murayama	Ashi Production	
September 25	The Guyver: Bio-Booster Armor	OVA series	Koichi Ishiguro	Visual '80	
September 25	Mandaraya no Ryôta: Kuonidani Onsen Tsuyasho Sodo Tan	OVA	Yuzo Aoki	Takahashi Studio	
September 28	Megazone 23 Part III	OVA series	Kenichi Yatagai, Shinji Aramaki	AIC, Artland	
October 2	The Jungle Book	TV series	Fumio Kurokawa	Nippon Animation	
October 2	Momotaro Densetsu	TV series	Akinori Yabe	Knack Productions	
October 3	Dash! Yonkuro	TV series	Hitoshi Nanba	Staff 21, Aubekku & Tokyu Agency	
October 7	Project A-ko 4: FINAL	OVA film	Yūji Moriyama	Pony Canyon, Soeishinsha, A.P.P.P., Studio Fantasia	
October 8	Dog Soldier: Shadows of the Past	OVA film	Hiroyuki Ebata	Animate Film, J.C. Staff	
October 9	Sally the Witch	TV series	Osamu Kasai	Toei Animation	
October 10	The Laughing Salesman	TV series	Toshirō Kuni	Shin-Ei Animation	
October 10	Seton Dōbutsuki	TV series	Takeshi Shirato	Eiken	
October 11	Patlabor: The TV Series	TV series	Naoyuki Yoshinaga	Sunrise	
October 12	The New Adventures of Kimba The White Lion	TV series	Takashi Ui, Rintaro	Tezuka Productions	
October 14	Darkness of the Sea, Shadow of the Moon	OVA series	Satoshi Dezaki	Visual '80	
October 14	Time Patrol Bon	TV special	Kunihiko Yuyama	Staff 21, Gallop	
October 15	City Hunter 3	TV series	Kenji Kodama	Sunrise	
October 16	Yawara!	TV series	Kazuo Yoshida	Toho Doga	
October 18	Magical Hat	TV series	Akira Shigino	Studio Pierrot	
October 19	Wrestler Gundan Seisenshi Robin Jr.	TV series	Masaharu Okuwaki	Tokyo Movie Shinsha	
October 21	Hyper Psychic Geo Garaga	Film	Hidemi Kubo	Aubec, AVN	
November 1	Baoh	OVA film	Hiroyuki Yokoyama	Studio Pierrot	
November 1	Cybernetics Guardian	OVA film	Koichi Ohata	AIC; ASMIK	
November 2	Chimpui	TV series	Mitsuru Hongo	Shin-Ei Animation	
November 4	Ise-wan Taifu Monogatari	Film	Seijirō Kōyama	Mushi Production	
November 8	Demon Hunter Makaryūdo	OVA film	Yukio Okamoto	Studio Fantasia, C.MOON	
November 14	Ano Ko ni 1000%	OVA film	Takehiro Miyano	Visual '80	
November 24	Blue Flames	OVA film	Noboru Ishiguro	Artland	
November 25	Ace o Nerae! Final Stage	OVA series	Osamu Dezaki	TMS Entertainment	
December 2	Dragon Quest	TV series	Katsuhisa Yamada, Rintarō, Takeyuki Kanda	Studio Comet	
December 16	Ogami Matsugoro	OVA film	Hidetoshi Ōmori	Nippon Animation	
December 21	Assemble Insert	OVA series	Ayumi Chibuki	Studio Core, Tohokushinsha Film	
	Inamura no Hi	OVA film		Gakken	
	Super Mario's Fire Brigade	OVA film	Mamoru Kanbe	Studio Junio, Aoni Production	

== Deaths ==
- February 9: Osamu Tezuka (b. 1928)

== See also ==
- 1989 in animation
