= Koichi Chiba =

Japanese voice actor and sound director

Koichi Chiba (千葉 耕市, Chiba Kōichi; August 13, 1931 - November 9, 2001) was a Japanese voice actor and sound director.

== Voice work ==
=== Television animation ===
- Astro Boy as Police Inspector Tawashi (second voice) in 1963 series and Dr. Hyde in 1980 series
- Big X as additional voices
- GaoGaiGar: King of the Braves as Cain
- Legendary Brave Da Garn as Ohboss
- Lupin the III as various roles in series part one and two
- Ronin Warriors as the narrator
- Urusei Yatsura as the school principal

=== OVA ===
- Giant Robo as Dr. Franken Von Folger
- Kaze to Ki no Uta as Professor Louie Renet

=== Theatrical animation ===
- Crusher Joe: The Movie as Corte Gianni
- Golgo 13: The Professional as The Watchmaker

=== Dubbing ===
==== Live-action ====
- Burgess Meredith
  - Rocky (Mickey Goldmill)
  - The Return of Captain Nemo (Prof. Waldo Cunningham)
  - Rocky II (Mickey Goldmill)
  - Rocky III (1987 TBS edition) (Mickey Goldmill)
  - Rocky V (1994 NTV edition) (Mickey Goldmill)
- Battle of the Commandos (1975 NTV edition) (Col. Ackerman (Wolfgang Preiss))
- Castle Keep (Lieutenant Billy Byron Bix (Bruce Dern))
- Chariots of Fire (1985 TBS edition) (Sam Mussabini (Ian Holm))
- Counterpoint (1973 TBS edition) (Col. Arndt (Anton Diffring))
- Damien: Omen II (1981 TBS edition) (David Pasarian (Allan Arbus))
- Dracula: Prince of Darkness (Klove (Philip Latham))
- The Great Escape II: The Untold Story (Dr. Absalon (Donald Pleasence))
- The Great Silence (Governor of Utah (Carlo D'Angelo))
- Guess Who's Coming to Dinner (Monsignor Mike Ryan (Cecil Kellaway))
- Battle Monsters (Chili Character-Chilli & Pepper)
- Papillon (1977 TV Asahi edition) (Toussaint Leper colony chief (Anthony Zerbe))
- The NeverEnding Story (1987 TV Asahi edition) (Cairon (Moses Gunn))
- Suspiria (1979 TBS edition) (Professor Milius (Rudolf Schündler), Narrator)
- Tower of Death (The Abbot (Roy Chiao))
- Way of the Dragon (1977 NTV edition) (Colt (Chuck Norris))

==== Animation ====
- Batman: The Animated Series as Nostromos / Carl Fowler

== Sound direction work ==
- Arion
- The Venus Wars
- SD Gundam (1988–1991)
- Ronin Warriors
- Dirty Pair (1985–1990)
- Crusher Joe: The Movie
- Dirty Pair Flash
