= 1989 in animation =

Events in 1989 in animation.

== Events ==
=== January ===
- January 15: The Simpsons short "The Krusty the Clown Show" first airs where Krusty the Clown makes his debut.

=== February ===
- February 3: L'Oréal closes down Filmation after 27 years.

=== March ===
- March 4: The first episode of Chip 'n Dale Rescue Rangers is broadcast.
- March 28: The first episode of Babar is broadcast.
- March 29: 61st Academy Awards:
  - Tin Toy by John Lasseter and William Reeves wins the Academy Award for Best Animated Short Film.
  - Richard Williams receives a Special Achievement Academy Award for Who Framed Roger Rabbit. The same film also wins the Academy Awards for Sound Editing, Film Editing, and Best Visual Effects.

=== April ===
- April 3:
  - The first episode of Alfred J. Kwak is broadcast.
  - The first episode of Ciné si is broadcast.
- April 26: The first episode of Dragon Ball Z is broadcast.

=== May ===
- May 14: The Simpsons shorts ends with the episode "TV Simpsons", seven months before it becomes a full-time animated series.
- May 23: Garfield's Babes and Bullets premieres on CBS. It is based on one of the stories featured in the book Garfield: His 9 Lives.

=== June ===
- June 4: The first episode of McGee and Me! is released to video.
- June 23: The Roger Rabbit short Tummy Trouble is released in theaters.

=== July ===
- July 15: Little Nemo: Adventures in Slumberland is first released.
- July 29: Hayao Miyazaki's Kiki's Delivery Service is first released. The film became generally acclaimed in its Japanese home country. Streamline Pictures released the English-dub the following year, but legal limitations by Tokuma Shoten prevented the film from being released internationally, including its lack of a theatrical release in the United States. Disney later retained the international rights of the film in 1998. The English dub was redone to make it more fitting for the United States. In 2017, GKIDS would later retain the rights of the film. Its English dialogue translates closer to the Japanese version.

=== September ===
- September 4: The Super Mario Bros. Super Show!, the first cartoon based on Super Mario Bros. by DIC Entertainment, airs on weekdays. Its sister show, The Legend of Zelda, the only cartoon based on the video game of the same name by said company, airs on Fridays. While the Mario cartoon received mixed reviews, the Zelda cartoon is regarded to be one of the worst animated series based on video games.
- September 9:
  - The first episode of Beetlejuice is broadcast, based on the film of the same name.
  - The first episode of Camp Candy is broadcast.
  - The first episode of Captain N: The Game Master is broadcast.
  - The first episode of The Karate Kid is broadcast. It gained a cult following in later years.
- September 14: The first episode of Penny Crayon is broadcast.
- September 16:
  - Season 2 of Garfield and Friends begins on CBS with the premiere of the following episodes:
    - "Pest of a Guest/The Impractical Joker/Fat and Furry"
    - "Rip Van Kitty/Grabbity/The Big Catnap"
  - The Captain N: The Game Master episode "How's Bayou" airs. It is one of the known cartoon episodes that were broadcast incomplete. There was a finished version broadcast, which was put in obscurity in the 21st century.
- September 22: Mike Jittlov's The Wizard of Speed and Time premieres.
- September 24: Snow White and the Seven Dwarfs is added to the National Film Registry.

=== October ===
- October 4: The fourth Astérix film, Asterix and the Big Fight is released.

=== November ===
- November 4: Nick Park's A Grand Day Out premieres, which marks the debut of Wallace and Gromit.
- November 14: The Little Mermaid, directed by Ron Clements and John Musker and produced by the Walt Disney Company, premieres.
- November 16: The Hungarian film Willy the Sparrow premieres.
- November 17: Don Bluth's All Dogs Go to Heaven premieres. It became a sleeper hit since its home video debut in 1990 in spite of the criticism during its original theatrical release. It also became a coveted film in later years and would be Bluth's last successful film until Anastasia in 1997. It was dedicated to child actress Judith Barsi, who was killed in 1988.
- November 22: Garfield's Thanksgiving premieres on CBS.

=== December ===
- December 16: Garfield and Friends concludes its second season on CBS with the following episodes:
  - "Lemon Aid/Hog Noon/Video Airlines"
  - "The Mail Animal/Peanut-Brained Rooster/Mummy Dearest"
- December 17: The first episode of The Simpsons, "Simpsons Roasting on an Open Fire", premieres on Fox, scripted by Mimi Pond. It marks the debuts of Seymour Skinner, Moe Szyslak, Mr. Burns, Barney Gumble, Patty and Selma, Ned Flanders, Todd Flanders, Santa's Little Helper, and Snowball II, with early appearances of Dewey Largo, Sherri and Terri, and Lewis. They would officially debut in later episodes of season 1.
- December 25: The film The BFG is first released. It is Brian Cosgrove and Mark Hall's only animated feature film.
- December 29: The animation studio Spümcø is established.

=== Specific date unknown ===
- Creative Capers Entertainment is founded.
- The first episode of Los Trotamúsicos (The Four Musicians of Bremen) is broadcast.
- The first episode of Purno de Purno is broadcast.
- Jan Švankmajer's Meat Love is first released.

== Films released ==
- January 27 - Goku Midnight Eye: Part One (Japan)
- February 22 - Riding Bean (Japan)
- March 11:
  - Doraemon: Nobita and the Birth of Japan (Japan)
  - The Five Star Stories (Japan)
  - Soreike! Anpanman: Kirakira Boshi no Namida (Japan)
  - The Three Musketeers Anime: Aramis' Adventure (Japan)
  - Venus Wars (Japan)
- March 18:
  - Saint Seiya: Warriors of the Final Holy Battle (Japan)
  - Urotsukidōji: Legend of the Overfiend (Japan)
- March 21 - Rhea Gall Force (Japan)
- April 1 - Lupin III: Bye Bye, Lady Liberty (Japan)
- April 8 - Hengen Taima Yakou Karura Mau! Nara Onryou Emaki (Japan)
- April 10 - Maria, Mirabela in Tranzistoria (Soviet Union and Romania)
- April 20 - El Escudo del cóndor (Argentina)
- May 6 - Molly and the Skywalkerz: Two Daddies? (United States)
- May 27 - Wrath of the Ninja (Japan)
- June 17 - City Hunter: .357 Magnum (Japan)
- June 25 - Riki-Oh: The Walls of Hell (Japan)
- June 26 - The Four Musicians of Bremen (Spain)
- July 7 - The Corsican Brothers (Australia)
- July 15:
  - Dragon Ball Z: Dead Zone (Japan)
  - Little Nemo: Adventures in Slumberland (Japan and United States)
  - Patlabor: The Movie (Japan)
- July 28 - Babar: The Movie (Canada and France)
- July 29 - Kiki's Delivery Service (Japan)
- August 16 - Cinderella Express (Japan)
- August 25 - Legend of Lemnear (Japan)
- August 27 - The Tezuka Osamu Story: I Am Son-goku (Japan)
- September 1 - Sonic Soldier Borgman: Last Battle (Japan)
- September 28 - Megazone 23 Part III (Japan)
- October 4 - Asterix and the Big Fight (France and West Germany)
- October 7 - Project A-ko 4: FINAL (Japan)
- October 8 - Dog Soldier: Shadows of the Past (Japan)
- October 14 - Time Patrol Bon (Japan)
- October 21 - Hyper Psychic Geo Garaga (Japan)
- November 1:
  - Baoh (Japan)
  - Cybernetics Guardian (Japan)
- November 4 - The Isewan Typhoon Story (Japan)
- November 17:
  - All Dogs Go to Heaven (United States, Ireland, and United Kingdom)
  - The Little Mermaid (United States)
- November 18 - Willy the Sparrow (Hungary)
- November 24 - Blue Flames (Japan)
- December 15 - The Journey to Melonia: Fantasies of Shakespeare's 'The Tempest' (Sweden and Norway)
- December 16 - Ogami Matsugoro (Japan)
- December 22:
  - Goku Midnight Eye: Part Two (Japan)
  - Megazone 23 – Final Part (Japan)
- December 25 - The BFG (United Kingdom)
- December 29 - A Tale of Two Toads (United Kingdom)
- Specific date unknown - Reynard the Fox (West Germany, China, and United Kingdom)

== Television series debuts ==
| Date | Title | Channel | Year |
|---|---|---|---|
| January 31 | The Further Adventures of SuperTed | Syndication | 1989 |
| March 4 | Chip 'n Dale: Rescue Rangers | The Disney Channel, Syndication | 1989–1990 |
| June 4 | McGee and Me! | Syndication | 1989–1995 |
| September 2 | G.I. Joe: A Real American Hero (1989) | Syndication | 1989–1992 |
| September 4 | The Super Mario Bros. Super Show! | Syndication | 1989 |
| September 8 | The Legend of Zelda | Syndication | 1989 |
| September 9 | Captain N: The Game Master | NBC | 1989–1991 |
| September 9 | The Karate Kid | NBC | 1989 |
| September 9 | Beetlejuice | ABC | 1989–1991 |
| September 16 | The California Raisin Show | CBS | 1989 |
| September 16 | Dink, the Little Dinosaur | CBS | 1989–1990 |
| September 16 | Rude Dog and the Dweebs | CBS | 1989 |
| September 16 | Ring Raiders | Syndication | 1989 |
| September 16 | Camp Candy | NBC, Syndication | 1989–1992 |
| December 2 | Paddington Bear | Syndication | 1989–1990 |
| December 17 | The Simpsons | Fox | 1989–present |

== Television series endings ==
| Date | Title | Channel | Year | Notes |
|---|---|---|---|---|
| January 7 | ALF: The Animated Series | NBC | 1987–1989 | Cancelled |
| January 14 | Snorks | NBC, Syndication | 1984–1989 | Ended |
| April 25 | The Further Adventures of SuperTed | Syndication | 1989 | Cancelled |
| September 29 | ThunderCats | Syndication | 1985–1989 | Cancelled |
| October 14 | Ring Raiders | Syndication | 1989 | Cancelled |
| November 30 | The Super Mario Bros. Super Show! | Syndication | 1989 | Ended |
| December 1 | The Legend of Zelda | Syndication | 1989 | Cancelled |
| December 2 | The Smurfs | NBC | 1981–1989 | Cancelled |
| December 9 | The California Raisin Show | CBS | 1989 | Cancelled |
| December 16 | The Karate Kid | NBC | 1989 | Cancelled |
| December 16 | Rude Dog and the Dweebs | CBS | 1989 | Cancelled |

== Births ==
=== January ===
- January 3: Alex D. Linz, American former child actor (voice of Franklin in The Wacky Adventures of Ronald McDonald, young Tarzan in Tarzan, young Cale Tucker in Titan A.E.).
- January 8: Karan Soni, Indian-American actor and comedian (voice of Spider-Man India in Spider-Man: Across the Spider-Verse, Caspian in Strange World, Riff in Trolls World Tour, Rishi Singal in Karma's World, Manjeet in Mira, Royal Detective, Gavin in The Great North episode "Woodfellas Adventure").
- January 17: Kelly Marie Tran, American actress (voice of Dawn Betterman in The Croods franchise, Raya in Raya and the Last Dragon, and Once Upon a Studio, Rose Tico in the Star Wars Forces of Destiny episode "Shuttle Shock").

=== February ===
- February 13: Carly McKillip, Canadian actress and musician (voice of the title character in Cardcaptor Sakura).
- February 19: Griffin Newman, American actor and comedian (voice of Pip in Disenchanted, Jared Kushner in Our Cartoon President, Orko in Masters of the Universe: Revelation, Mad Hatter in the Harley Quinn episode "Another Sharkley Adventure").
- February 24: Daniel Kaluuya, English actor (voice of Bluebell in Watership Down, Spider-Punk in Spider-Man: Across the Spider-Verse).
- February 25: Kana Hanazawa, Japanese actress and singer (voice of Nadeko Sengoku in Monogatari, Anri Sonohara in Durarara!!, Angel/Kanade Tachibana in Angel Beats!, Kuroneko/Ruri Gokō in Oreimo, Mayuri Shiina in Steins;Gate, Akane Tsunemori in Psycho-Pass, Kosaki Ondera in Nisekoi, Chiaki Nanami in Danganronpa, Kobato Hanato in Kobato, Rize Kamishiro in Tokyo Ghoul, Hinata Kawamoto in March Comes in Like a Lion, Ichika Nakano in The Quintessential Quintuplets, Mitsuri Kanroji in Demon Slayer: Kimetsu no Yaiba).

=== March ===
- March 9: Jason Marnocha, American voice actor (voice of Jor-El in My Adventures with Superman, Megatron in Transformers: Titans Return, Victor Vasko in Lackadaisy).
- March 11: Anton Yelchin, American actor (voice of Jim Lake in Trollhunters: Tales of Arcadia, Shun Kazama in From Up on Poppy Hill, Albino Pirate in The Pirates! In an Adventure with Scientists!), (d. 2016).
- March 18: Lily Collins, English-American actress (voice of Baby Ape in Tarzan, Princess Dawn in Here Comes the Grump).
- March 20: Corey Padnos, American actor (voice of Cooper in Ben 10: Alien Force, Porkchop in Batman: Gotham Knight, Linus in the Peanuts franchise from 2000 to 2003).
- March 30: Cole Howard, Canadian actor (voice of Bert Wily in Mega Man: Fully Charged, Wakiya Murasaki in Beyblade Burst, Shion Kiba in Cardfight!! Vanguard, Terramar in My Little Pony: Friendship Is Magic).

=== April ===
- April 5: Freddie Fox, English actor (voice of Dennis in Dennis & Gnasher: Unleashed!, Captain Holly in Watership Down).
- April 12: Alice Lee, American actress and singer (voice of Lois Lane in My Adventures with Superman).
- April 19: Simu Liu, Canadian actor (voice of Lah Zhima in the Star Wars: Visions episode "The Ninth Jedi", Hubert Wong in The Simpsons episode "When Nelson Met Lisa", Gerald Mesmerizer in the Corner Gas Animated episode "The Fresh Prints of Bell Heir").
- April 20:
  - Carlos Valdes, Colombian-American actor (voice of Vibe in Freedom Fighters: The Ray).
  - Chris Houghton, American animator (Fanboy & Chum Chum, Disney Television Animation, Harvey Beaks), character designer (Gravity Falls, Adventure Time, Clarence), prop designer (Adventure Time), writer (Mickey Mouse, Harvey Beaks), producer, voice actor and brother of Shane Houghton (co-creator and voice of Cricket Green in Big City Greens).
- April 22: Jonathan Finn-Gamiño, American character designer (American Dad!) and storyboard artist (American Dad!, Big Mouth), (d. 2022).

=== May ===
- May 18: Alan Becker, American online animator (Animator vs. Animation).
- May 29: Brandon Mychal Smith, American actor (voice of Michelangelo in Rise of the Teenage Mutant Ninja Turtles, Lamar Harris in the Kim Possible episode "Two to Tutor").
- May 30: Yui Ishikawa, Japanese actress and voice actress (voice of the title character in Violet Evergarden, Mikasa Ackerman in Attack on Titan).

=== June ===
- June 3: Megumi Han, Japanese actress (voice of Atsuko Kagari in Little Witch Academia, Gon Freecss in Hunter × Hunter, and Hime Shirayuki / Cure Princess in HappinessCharge PreCure!, Japanese dub voice of Ryder in PAW Patrol, Bliss in The Powerpuff Girls, Cheerilee in My Little Pony: Friendship Is Magic, and Sonata Dusk in My Little Pony: Equestria Girls – Rainbow Rocks).
- June 9: Logan Browning, American actress (voice of Onyx in Young Justice, adult Penny Proud in The Proud Family: Louder and Prouder episode "When You Wish Upon a Roker").
- June 14: Lucy Hale, American actress (voice of Periwinkle in Secret of the Wings, Zoe Bell in Trouble).
- June 20: Christopher Mintz-Plasse, American actor and comedian (voice of Fishlegs Ingerman in the How to Train Your Dragon franchise, King Gristle in the Trolls franchise, Alvin in ParaNorman).
- June 27: Kimiko Glenn, American actress (voice of Lena Sabrewing in DuckTales, Peni Parker in Spider-Man: Into the Spider-Verse, and Spider-Man: Across the Spider-Verse, Stefani Stilton in Bojack Horseman, Horse in Centaurworld, Izzy Moonbow in My Little Pony: A New Generation, General Ezor in Voltron: Legendary Defender, Margot in Summer Camp Island, Chuluun in The Lion Guard, Baby Shark in Baby Shark's Big Show!, Paperstar in Carmen Sandiego, the title character in Kiff).
- June 28: Markiplier, American YouTuber (voice of 5.0.5. in Villainous).

=== July ===
- July 2: Barbara Dunkelman, Canadian actress and internet personality (voice of Yang Xiao Long in RWBY, Nerris in Camp Camp).
- July 23: Daniel Radcliffe, English actor (voice of Rex Dasher in Playmobil: The Movie, himself in the BoJack Horseman episode "Let's Find Out").
- July 25: Andrew Caldwell, American actor (voice of Howard Weinerman in Randy Cunningham: 9th Grade Ninja, Mitch Bilsky in The Adventures of Kid Danger, Teen Roku in the Avatar: The Last Airbender episode "The Avatar and the Firelord").
- July 31: Zelda Williams, American actress (voice of Kuvira in The Legend of Korra, Mona Lisa in Teenage Mutant Ninja Turtles, Casey Jones in Rise of the Teenage Mutant Ninja Turtles).

=== August ===
- August 4: Alec Schwimmer, American television writer (Nickelodeon Animation Studio).
- August 11: Alexis Tipton, American voice actress (Funimation).
- August 18: Anna Akana, American actress (voice of Gloria Sato in Big City Greens, Sasha Waybright in Amphibia, Daisy in Magical Girl Friendship Squad).
- August 19:
  - Domee Shi, Chinese-born Canadian animator, screenwriter and director (Pixar).
  - Romeo Miller, American rapper, actor, and television personality (voiced himself in the Static Shock episode "Romeo in the Mix", and performed the third theme song of the series).
- August 21: Hayden Panettiere, American actress (voice of Dot in A Bug's Life, Suri in Dinosaur, Ashley in the American Dad! episode "Stan's Food Restaurant", Red Puckett in Hoodwinked Too! Hood vs. Evil, Yumi in the Fillmore! episode "Code Name: Electric Haircut", Cheetara in the Robot Chicken "Endless Breadsticks", Fairy Princess Willow in Scooby-Doo! and the Goblin King, Kate in Alpha and Omega) and singer (performed "I Still Believe" for Cinderella III: A Twist in Time), (d. 2026).

=== September ===
- September 5: Kat Graham, American actress and singer (voice of April O'Neil in Rise of the Teenage Mutant Ninja Turtles, Rhythm and Blues in Trolls: TrollsTopia).
- September 6:
  - Lindsay Jones, American actor, director, gamer and host (voice of Ruby Rose in RWBY, Kimball in Red vs. Blue).
  - Tord Larsson, English voice actor (voice of Tord in Eddsworld).
- September 7: Daiki Yamashita, Japanese voice actor (voice of Izuku Midoriya in My Hero Academia).
- September 14: Kazumi Evans, Canadian actress (voice of Adagio Dazzle in My Little Pony: Equestria Girls – Rainbow Rocks, Rogue the Bat in Sonic Prime, Queen Sarai in The Dragon Prince, singing voice of Rarity and Princess Luna in My Little Pony: Friendship is Magic).
- September 17: Danielle Brooks, American actress (voice of Pearle Watson in Close Enough, Ruthless Ruth in the Rapunzel's Tangled Adventure episode "The Wrath of Ruthless Ruth", Charica in the Elena of Avalor episode "A Lava Story").
- September 22: Sofía Espinosa, Mexican actress, writer and director (voice of Mama Luisa Rivera in Coco).
- September 27: Rumi Okubo, Japanese actress (voice of Ako Shirabe / Cure Muse in Suite PreCure, Chinatsu Yoshikawa in YuruYuri, Astolfo in Fate/Apocrypha, Suguri Kinoshita in Happy Kappy).
- September 29: Makoto Furukawa, Japanese voice actor and singer (voice of Saitama in One-Punch Man, Banri Tada in Golden Time, Miyuki Shirogane in Kaguya-sama: Love Is War).

=== October ===
- October 5: Kensho Ono, Japanese voice actor (voice of Floch Forster in Attack on Titan, Giorno Giovanna in JoJo's Bizarre Adventure: Golden Wind, Larcade Dragneel in Fairy Tail, Japanese dub voice of Miles Morales in Spider-Man: Into the Spider-Verse and Mugman in The Cuphead Show!).
- October 13: Skyler Page, American animator (TripTank), storyboard artist (Secret Mountain Fort Awesome, Adventure Time), writer (Adventure Time), director (TripTank), producer and voice actor (creator and voice of the title character in Clarence).
- October 24: PewDiePie, Swedish internet personality (portrayed himself in the South Park episodes "Rehash" and "HappyHolograms", voice of Lonely Guy and Magician in asdfmovie8).
- October 30: Dustin Ybarra, American actor and comedian (voice of Armadillo in M.O.D.O.K., Danny Publitz in the Rick and Morty episode "The Old Man and the Seat", Macho in the Elena of Avalor episode "Changing of the Guard").

=== November ===
- November 10:
  - Sherry Cola, American comedian and actress (voice of Helen in Turning Red, Naomi in The Tiger's Apprentice, Female Talent Judge in Thelma the Unicorn, Viv in Baby Shark's Big Show!, Cadet Kwan in Transformers: Earthspark, Ms. Mahoney in the Primos episode "Summer of Bookita").
  - Taron Egerton, Welsh actor (voice of Johnny in the Sing franchise).
- November 19: Caitlynne Medrek, Canadian actress (voice of Dawn in Total Drama: Revenge of the Island, Mikoto in My-HiMe, Miu Matsuoka in Strawberry Marshmallow, Pan in Dragon Ball GT).
- November 22: Jon Rudnitsky, American actor and comedian (voice of Ned Ludd in Big Hero 6: The Series, Cyrus in Jurassic World Camp Cretaceous, Jimmy in Under the Boardwalk, Dario in Wish).

=== December ===
- December 6: Della Saba, English actress (voice of Aquamarine in Steven Universe, young Judy Hopps in Zootopia, Bazeema in Wish).
- December 7: Nicholas Hoult, English actor (voice of Grosso in Underdogs, Jon Arbuckle in The Garfield Movie, Patrick in Crossing Swords, Harry Potter and Captain America in the Robot Chicken episode "Collateral Damage in Gang Turf War").
- December 13: Taylor Swift, American singer, songwriter, and actress (voice of Audrey in The Lorax, performed the song "I Knew It, I Knew You" in Toy Story 5).
- December 21: Quinta Brunson, American writer, producer, comedian, and actress (voice of Ivy in Cars on the Road, herself in Big Mouth, Hawkgirl in the Harley Quinn episode "A Very Problematic Valentine's Day Special", Dr. Fuzzby in Zootopia 2).
- December 22: Jordin Sparks, American singer and actress (voice of Blue Mermaid in the Team Umizoomi episode "The Legend of the Blue Mermaid", Gary's Mom in the Doug Unplugs episode "Botty Holidays", Tabitha in the Rugrats episode "Rescuing Cynthia").
- December 26: Blayn Barbosa, American former child actor (voice of Dwayne McCall in the Static Shock episode "Child's Play", second voice of Bucky Buenaventura in The Zeta Project).

== Deaths ==
=== January ===
- January 3: Errol Le Cain, English children's book illustrator and animator (worked for Richard Williams), dies at age 47.

=== February ===
- February 5: Joe Raposo, American composer, songwriter, pianist, singer and lyricist (Sesame Street, Raggedy Ann & Andy: A Musical Adventure, Dr. Seuss, Madeline), dies at age 51.
- February 9: Osamu Tezuka, Japanese manga artist and animator (Astro Boy, Kimba the White Lion, Black Jack, Phoenix, Princess Knight, Unico, Message to Adolf, The Amazing 3, Buddha), dies at age 60.
- February 10: Herbert Ryman, American artist (Walt Disney Animation Studios), dies at age 78.
- February 11: George O'Hanlon, American actor (voice of George Jetson in The Jetsons), dies at age 76.

=== March ===
- March 6: Harry Andrews, English actor (voice of General Woundwort in Watership Down), dies at age 77.
- March 9: Fred Mogubgub, American painter and animator, dies from bone cancer at age 61.
- March 30: Mike Sekowsky, American comics artist, writer and animator (Hanna-Barbera), dies at age 65.

=== April ===
- April 5: Karel Zeman, Czech film director, animator and animation producer (Mr. Prokouk, The Fabulous World of Jules Verne), dies at age 78.
- April 9: Carl Wessler, American comics artist, animator and writer (Fleischer Studios), dies at age 75.
- April 24: Clyde Geronimi, Italian-American animation director (Bray Productions, Walter Lantz Productions, Walt Disney Company), dies at age 87.
- April 27: William Arthur Smith, American animation writer, comics artist and illustrator (worked for Walter Lantz), dies at age 71.

=== May ===
- May 2: Bennie Benjamin, Virgin Islands-born American songwriter (Fun and Fancy Free, Melody Time), dies at age 81.
- May 20: Gilda Radner, American comedian and actress (voice of the Witch in Witch's Night Out, various characters in Animalympics), dies from ovarian cancer at age 42.

=== June ===
- June 1: Emery Hawkins, American animator (Walt Disney Company, Screen Gems, Walter Lantz, Warner Bros. Cartoons, MGM, UPA), dies at age 77.
- June 2: Takeo Watanabe, Japanese musician and composer (Cutie Honey, Candy Candy, Mobile Suit Gundam), dies at age 56.

=== July ===
- July 2: Ben Wright, English actor (voice of Roger Radcliffe in 101 Dalmatians, Rama in The Jungle Book, Grimsby in The Little Mermaid), dies at age 74.
- July 3: Jim Backus, American voice actor (voice of Mr. Magoo in various media, Thurston Howell III in The New Adventures of Gilligan and Gilligan's Planet, Smokey the Genie in A-Lad-In His Lamp, Milton in Plutopia), dies at age 76.
- July 4:
  - Camilla Mickwitz, Finnish animator, children's book writer and illustrator (Jason), dies at age 54.
  - Vic Perrin, American actor (voice of Dr. Zin in Jonny Quest) dies at age 73.
- July 9: Lillian Friedman Astor, American animator (Fleischer Brothers), dies at age 77.
- July 10: Mel Blanc, American voice actor (voice of Bugs Bunny, Daffy Duck, Porky Pig, Tweety Bird, Sylvester the Cat and various other characters in the Looney Tunes franchise, Barney Rubble and Dino in The Flintstones, Mr. Spacely in The Jetsons, original voice of Woody Woodpecker), dies at age 81.
- July 29: Rudy Zamora, Mexican-American animator and animation director (Jay Ward Productions, Hanna-Barbera), dies at age 79.

=== August ===
- August 4: Paul Murry, American animator, comics artist and writer (Walt Disney Company), dies at age 77.
- August 12: Vic Kephart, American television producer (The Adventures of Teddy Ruxpin, ALF Tales) and production assistant (DIC Entertainment), dies at age 26.
- August 27: Bill Shirley, American actor and singer (voice of Prince Phillip in Sleeping Beauty), dies at age 68.

=== September ===
- September 3: Franzisca Baruch, German-Israeli graphic designer, and character designer (designed characters and titles for the animated film Goethe is Alive!), dies at age 87.
- September 9: Nat Falk, American illustrator and cartoonist (How to Make Animated Cartoons), dies at age 91.

=== October ===
- October 4: Graham Chapman, English actor and comedian (occasional voices in Terry Gilliam's animated shorts in Monty Python's Flying Circus and the film spin-offs), dies from cancer at age 48.
- October 11: Paul Shenar, American actor and theater director (voice of Jenner in The Secret of NIMH), dies at age 53.
- October 12: Jay Ward, American animator and producer (Crusader Rabbit, Rocky & Bullwinkle, Dudley Do-Right, Mr. Peabody and Sherman, Hoppity Hooper, George of the Jungle, Tom Slick, Super Chicken), dies at age 69.
- October 21: Jean Image, Hungarian-French animator and film director (Johnny the Giant Killer, Kiri le Clown, Joe), dies at age 79.

=== November ===
- November 17: Billy Lee, American actor (voice of the boy in The Reluctant Dragon), dies at age 60.
- November 22: Gerry Chiniquy, American animator and film director (Warner Bros. Cartoons, DePatie-Freleng Enterprises), dies at age 77.
- November 28: Ion Popescu-Gopo, Romanian graphic artist, animator and film director (Scurtă Istorie, The White Moor, Gopo's Little Man), dies at age 66.

=== December ===
- December 6:
  - Frances Bavier, American actress (model for Flora in Sleeping Beauty), dies at age 86.
  - Sammy Fain, American composer (Walt Disney Animation Studios), dies at age 87.
- December 13: Sammy Lerner, Romanian songwriter (Popeye theme), dies at age 86.

=== Specific date unknown ===
- Karel van Milleghem, Belgian journalist and chief editor (initiator of Belvision), dies at age 65 or 66.
- George Wheeler, American animator and comics artist (Walt Disney Company, Hanna-Barbera, Filmation), dies at age 69 or 70.

== See also ==
- 1989 in anime
