= Takeyuki =

- Gender: Male

Origin
- Origin: Japanese
- Meaning: Different meanings depending on the kanji used

Takeyuki (written: 武幸, 武行 or 竹通) is a masculine Japanese given name. Notable people with the name include:

- Takeyuki Kanda (神田 武幸; 1943–1996), Japanese anime director
- Takeyuki Nakayama (中山 竹通; born 1959), Japanese marathon runner
- Takeyuki Okamoto (岡本 武行; born 1967), Japanese footballer and manager
