= Hiroshi Takemura =

Japanese voice actor (born 1953)

Hiroshi Takemura (竹村 拓, Takemura Hiroshi; born on October 24, 1953, in Tokyo, Japan) is a Japanese voice actor. He is an alumnus of the theatrical troupe Gekidan Baraza, which was directed by Nachi Nozawa. His hobbies include billiards, skiing, fishing and tennis. Currently belongs to Office Kaoru.

== Anime ==
=== TV ===
- After War Gundam X (Lancerow Dawell)
- Argento Soma (Mr. X)
- Future GPX Cyber Formula (Shinsuke Maki)
- God Mazinger (Yamato Hibino)
- Highschool! Kimen-gumi (Men'ichi Nikaidō)
- Metal Armor Dragonar (Werner Fritz)
- Mobile Suit Gundam SEED (Marco Morassim)
- Obake no Q-tarō (Godzilla)
- Ronin Warriors (Tōma Hashiba)
- Round Vernian Vifam (Barts Ryan)
- Sazae-san (Jinmu Isazaka)
- Transformers: Super-God Masterforce (Ginrai)
- Transformers: Victory (God Ginrai, Victory Leo)

=== OVA ===
- Armored Trooper Votoms: The Red Shoulder Document: Roots of Ambition (Carson)
- Crusher Joe: The Ice Prison (Joe)
- Crusher Joe: The Ultimate Weapon: Ash (Joe)
- Kaze to Ki no Uta: Sanctus (Pascal Biquet)
- Yoroiden Samurai Troopers Gaiden (Tōma Hashiba)
- Yoroiden Samurai Troopers: Legend of Kikoutei (Tōma Hashiba)
- Yoroiden Samurai Troopers: Message (Tōma Hashiba)

=== Movies ===
- Crusher Joe: The Movie (Joe)
- Mobile Suit Gundam: Char's Counterattack (operator)

=== Dubbing ===
- Blue Steel (Howard (Matt Craven))
- Lucky Stars Go Places (Fat Cat (Kent Cheng))
- Twin Peaks (James Hurley (James Marshall))

== Drama CDs ==
- Yoroiden Samurai Troopers Debut Album: Kimi o Nemurasenai (King Records, February 5, 1993)
- Yoroiden Samurai Troopers: Best Friends (King Records, February 5, 1993)
- Yoroiden Samurai Troopers Cassette Collection: Soshite Gonin
- Yoroiden Samurai Troopers Kōrinden
- Yoroiden Samurai Troopers Tenkūden
- Yoroiden Samurai Troopers: Tsuki
