= Round-Vernian Vifam =

Japanese anime television series

- 銀河漂流バイファム
- Genre: Mecha, Military Science Fiction, Adventure
- Created by: Story: Takeyuki Kanda; Hiroyuki Hoshiyama; Concept: Hajime Yatate; Yoshiyuki Tomino
- Developed by: Hiroyuki Hoshiyama
- Directed by: Takeyuki Kanda
- Music by: Toshiyuki Watanabe
- Country of origin: Japan
- Original language: Japanese
- No. of episodes: 46

Production
- Producers: Masuo Ueda; Yoshihiko Marutani
- Production companies: Mainichi Broadcasting System; Nippon Sunrise

Original release
- Network: JNN (MBS, TBS)
- Release: October 21, 1983 – September 8, 1984

Related
- Original video animation

Kachua Kara no Tayori
- Directed by: Takeyuki Kanda
- Written by: Masanori Miura
- Music by: Toshiyuki Watanabe
- Studio: Nippon Sunrise
- Released: October 28, 1984
- Original video animation

Atsumatta 13-nin
- Directed by: Takeyuki Kanda
- Written by: Masanori Miura
- Music by: Toshiyuki Watanabe
- Studio: Nippon Sunrise
- Released: December 21, 1984
- Video game

Ginga Horyu Vifam
- Publisher: Bandai
- Genre: Action game Space combat simulator
- Platform: MSX
- Released: 1984
- Original video animation

Kieta 12-nin
- Directed by: Takeyuki Kanda
- Written by: Yasushi Hirano
- Music by: Toshiyuki Watanabe
- Studio: Nippon Sunrise
- Released: February 25, 1985
- Original video animation

"Kate no Kioku" Namida no Dakkai Sakusen!!
- Directed by: Takeyuki Kanda
- Written by: Yasushi Hirano
- Music by: Toshiyuki Watanabe
- Studio: Nippon Sunrise
- Released: September 21, 1985
- Anime television series

Round-Vernian Vifam 13
- Directed by: Toshifumi Kawase
- Written by: Tetsurō Amino
- Music by: Toshiyuki Watanabe
- Studio: Sunrise
- Original network: MBS
- Original run: March 21, 1998 – October 3, 1998
- Episodes: 26

Round-Vernian Vifam (Japanese: 銀河漂流バイファム, Hepburn: Ginga Hyōryū Baifamu; lit. 'Galactic Drifter Vifam') is a 1983 mecha anime television series produced by Nippon Sunrise, loosely based on Jules Verne's novel Deux Ans de Vacances. It was officially drafted by Yoshiyuki Tomino, the creator of Mobile Suit Gundam and planned by both Takeyuki Kanda (who also serves as its director) and Hiroyuki Hoshiyama. It aired at both MBS and TBS from October 21, 1983, to September 8, 1984.

== Plot ==
In the far-flung future of 2058, hostile alien forces (collectively known as the "Astrogaters") attack the human colony at Clayad, the third planet of the Ypserlon system, which is located 43 light years away from Earth. Because of this, the colonists on Clayad are evacuated from the planet by the human military. During the confusion, some of the human children become stranded from their parents and escape in the training combat space ship, the Janous. With the help of the ship's defense systems, they manage to arrive at Belwick, the fourth planet of the system, where other humans supposedly live. However, upon arriving they discover that the colony at Belwick had already been destroyed by the enemies too. Learning to pilot the VIFAMs and other mecha, the 13 children decide to escape to Earth by themselves.

On their way to Earth, they discover a damaged alien ship piloted by a friendly Astrogater. From him they learn that one of the children is actually an alien as well; their parents have been captured and taken to the Astrogater home planet Kukto's artificial satellite, Tuat. After numerous battles with Astrogaters (or Kuktonians as they call themselves), and receiving some help from Earth military forces, they manage to reach Tuat. One of the children is captured and taken prisoner on Tuat where he learns that there is a rebel faction among the Kuktonians and effects an escape with the help of the imprisoned rebels. After liberating the alien prisoners, the children learn that their parents have been moved planet side to Kukto, where they make an attempt to rescue them.

== Characters ==
Roddy Shuffle (ロディ・シャッフル, Rodi Shaffuru)
Voiced by: Katsuhiro Nanba (Vifam), Sōichirō Hoshi (Vifam 13)
Barts Lyan (バーツ・ライアン, Bātsu Raian)
Voiced by: Hiroshi Takemura
Scott Heyward (スコット・ヘイワード, Sukotto Heiwādo)
Voiced by: Katsumi Toriumi
Clare Barbland (クレア・バーブランド, Kurea Bāburando)
Voiced by: Miina Tominaga
Katue Pearson (カチュア・ピアスン, Kachua Piasun)
Voiced by: Hiroko Kasahara
Maki Rowel (マキ・ローウェル, Maki Rōweru)
Voiced by: Kyōko Hamura (Vifam), Chiharu Tezuka (Vifam 13)
Kentz Norton (ケンツ・ノートン, Kentsu Nōton)
Voiced by: Masako Nozawa
Sharron Publin (シャロン・パブリン, Sharon Paburin)
Voiced by: Eriko Hara
Fred Shuffle (フレッド・シャッフル, Fureddo Shaffuru)
Voiced by: Hidehiro Kikuchi
Pench Eliza (ペンチ・イライザ, Penchi Iraiza)
Voiced by: Runa Akiyama
Jimmy Eril (ジミー・エリル, Jimī Eriru)
Voiced by: Sachiko Chijimatsu
Marlo Bonner Jr. (マルロ・Jr.・ボナー, Maruro Jūnia Bonā)
Voiced by: Run Sasaki
Lucina Pressette (ルチーナ・プレシェット, Ruchīna Pureshetto)
Voiced by: Kumiko Takizawa
Kate Hathaway (ケイト・ハザウェイ, Keito Hazawei)
Voiced by: Kumiko Takizawa
Melvin Clake (メルビン・クレーク, Merubin Kurēku)
Voiced by: Shigezō Sasaoka
Frederick Roden (フレデリック・ローデン, Furederikku Rōden)
Voiced by: Shūsei Nakamura (Vifam), Yuzuru Fujimoto (Vifam 13)

== Production ==
The series was conceived by Gundam creator Yoshiyuki Tomino and directed by Takeyuki Kanda. It included mechanical designs by artists Kunio Okawara (who previously designed mecha for the Mobile Suit Gundam anime series) and Mamoru Nagano, as well as character designs by the late Toyoo Ashida (famous for his work in Magical Princess Minky Momo).

The show's intro theme, "Hello Vifam", was composed and sung by Japanese artist David Mann, with lyrics by Jeanette Mann, and performed by the progressive rock band TAO. The theme is one of the first Japanese anime title songs written entirely in English.

Galactic Drifter Vifam premiered in Japan on Japan News Network's television stations (including MBS and TBS) between October 21, 1983, and September 8, 1984.

After the TV series, four OVAs were released via Warner Home Video and later, Warner Music Vision. The first two were recaps. The third OVA is a side story that takes place during the TV series. The fourth OVA is an epilogue.

An "interquel" series, Round-Vernian Vifam 13 (銀河漂流バイファム13, Ginga Hyōryū Baifamu Sātīn), aired on MBS and several independent stations between March 21, 1998, and October 3, 1998.

The first series was also later re-run in Japan on Animax on December 23, 2006.

== Video game ==
There was a video game adaptation, also entitled Ginga Hyoryuu Vifam, released by Bandai for the MSX computer platform in 1984. It was an action game and space combat simulator that uses 3D wire-frame graphics.

The game allowed the player to explore open space while switching between three monitors, each one displaying a different perspective. The first monitor displays a top-down perspective used mainly for navigation, the second monitor displays a first-person perspective which can be used to explore through space or engage enemies in first-person shooter combat, and the third monitor is used for servicing the player's mecha.

The game also implemented an early physics engine where approaching a planet's gravitational field pulls the player towards it; if the player gets caught in a gravity field, they must accelerate out of the gravity field in a close-up view. The game also uses a radar that displays the relative positions of the player and enemies as well as the destination.
