= Crusher Joe =

Series of science fiction novels by Haruka Takachiho and its franchise

- First edition cover of the first novel

クラッシャージョウ (Kurasshā Jō)
- Novel series
- Written by: Haruka Takachiho
- Illustrated by: Yoshikazu Yasuhiko
- Published by: Asahi Sonorama/Asahi Shimbun Publications
- Original run: 1977 – 2016
- Volumes: 13
- Manga
- Written by: Haruka Takachiho
- Illustrated by: Fujihiko Hosono
- Published by: Asahi Sonorama
- English publisher: NA: Studio Ironcat
- Magazine: Manga Shōnen
- Published: 1979
- Volumes: 1
- Anime film
- Directed by: Yoshikazu Yasuhiko
- Written by: Haruka Takachiho; Yoshikazu Yasuhiko
- Music by: Norio Maeda
- Studio: Studio Nue; Nippon Sunrise
- Licensed by: NA: Discotek Media
- Released: 12 March 1983
- Runtime: 132 minutes
- Original video animation
- Directed by: Toshifumi Takizawa
- Written by: Fuyunori Gobu
- Music by: Keiichi Oku
- Studio: Studio Nue; Sunrise
- Licensed by: NA: Discotek Media
- Released: 5 February 1989 – 5 June 1989
- Runtime: 60 minutes (each)
- Episodes: 2
- Manga

Crusher Joe Rebirth
- Written by: Haruka Takachiho
- Illustrated by: Yu Harii
- Published by: Kodansha
- Magazine: Evening (2017–2022)
- Original run: 12 September 2017 – present
- Volumes: 6

Crusher Joe (Japanese: クラッシャージョウ, Hepburn: Kurasshā Jō) is a series of science fiction novels written by Haruka Takachiho and published by Asahi Sonorama from 1977 to 2005 (an additional trilogy was published between 2013 and 2016). During the late 1970s one of the founding fathers of Studio Nue, Takachiho, decided that besides being a designer he would try his hand at penning novels. The result was Crusher Joe, whose antiheroes were not the typical self-sacrificing types but noble in their own right nonetheless.

Crusher Joe was made into an animated film in 1983 and two original video animation (OVA) episodes in 1989. The film version won the Animage Anime Grand Prix prize in 1983. The film features several guest designs by Katsuhiro Otomo, Akira Toriyama, Rumiko Takahashi and Hideo Azuma. In 2021, Takachiho revealed that he worked with Otomo on a sequel film "a long time ago." Otomo created a storyboard for the beginning of the sequel and gave it to Sunrise, but the project fell through. The movie and the OVA series were licensed for English release by Discotek Media in 2016.

A manga series illustrated by Yu Harii, titled Crusher Joe Rebirth, started in Kodansha's seinen manga magazine Evening on 12 September 2017; the manga went on hiatus in February 2022, and the magazine ceased its publication in February 2023. Its chapters have been collected in six volumes as of December 2025.

== Plot ==
Enter the tale of the Crusher Council, a group of rugged individuals known for assignments ranging from transportation to terraforming and everything in between. In the early days of space exploration the Crushers took on the job of destroying asteroids and defining space lanes. Because of their work, they were nicknamed "Crushers" which eventually became their business moniker.

The Crushers work to a code that bars unethical and illegal assignments, and a Crusher who accepts one is expelled from the Union. Because the Union treats an accepted assignment as binding, clients with illicit aims attempt to secure the Crushers' agreement by misrepresenting the work. The series follows the team led by Crusher Dan and afterwards by his successor, Crusher Joe.

== Characters ==
Joe
The headstrong leader of his Crusher Team, Joe became a Crusher at the age of ten and replaced his father as the active head of the Crushers. Now nineteen, he maintains his Triple A rating. Joe has an intense dislike for authority (other than his own) and refuses to take orders from anyone, including his father. However, he does have a lighter side, which enables him to take the balance of a situation and to act quickly and calmly. He and Alfin are romantically involved.
Alfin
Princess of the Planet Pizanne who left her home and royal status to join the Crushers. After the Pizanne incident she sneaks aboard the Minerva and takes the late Gambino's place as navigator. Perky, bubbly and easily intoxicated, Alfin is also quick-witted and fearless. She and Joe are romantically involved.
Talos
Talos served with Joe's father, Crusher Dan, in the early days of the Crusher Union. After 40 years of being a Crusher, eighty percent of his body has been replaced with cybernetic implants. These artificial limbs often come in handy (his left arm contains a machine gun). Talos is gruff and reserved and possesses enormous strength, a trait that has saved his teammates on more than one occasion. He serves as the team's pilot.
Ricky
At the age of fifteen, Ricky is the youngest member of the Joe Team but this in no way hinders his performance as the ship's engineer. Orphaned when gang members killed his parents, Ricky stows away on board the Minerva. His sharp wits and instant reflexes soon establish him as a member of the team. He is quick tempered and easily riled, and his teammate Talos often finds himself restraining the young engineer. He also spars with Alfin like a younger sibling.
Dongo
The Dongo Mabot served with both Talos and Crusher Dan in the early days of the Federation. A robot with a warped sense of humor (he is often seen reading porn magazines), he is completely loyal and is capable of operating the Minerva when the team is absent.

== Cast ==
The Movie
Character	Japanese	English	
Character	Japanese	Enoki Films (1983)	AnimEigo/Coastal Studios (1997)
Joe	Hiroshi Takemura	Brian Cummings	Michael Brady
Alfin	Run Sasaki	Kathy Ritter	Juliet Cesario
Talos	Kiyoshi Kobayashi	Jan Rabson	Dave Underwood
Ricky	Noriko Ohara	Kathy Ritter	Shaun O'Rourke
Dongo	Issei Futamata		Amiga 3000 (speech synthesis)
Colonel Kowalsky	Gorou Naya	Jan Rabson	Marc Matney
Bard	Osamu Kobyashi		Bob Edwards
Dan	Akira Kume	Jan Rabson	Daniel Morris
Jonah Matua	Reiko Mutou		Stacia Crawford
Murphy	Chikao Ootsuka		Michael S. Way
Killie	Kazuyuki Sogabe		Robin Robertson
Nero	Takeshi Watabe		Kevin Potts
Roki	Daisuke Gouri		Sean P. O'Connell
Cat's Eye Norma	Kazuko Yanaga		Belinda Bizic-Keller
Valenstinos	Nobuo Tanaka		Pierre Brulatour
Cortigiano	Kouichi Chiba		Jerry Winsett
DuPrau Mardola	Hidekatsu Shibata		Norm Shore
Pirate Dr.	Masaru Ikeda		Patrick Humphrey
Pirate Chief	Masato Tachizawa		
Pirate	Shin'ya Ootaki		
Officer	Tomomichi Nishimura		
Anessa	Kan Sakai		
Control Room Officers	Hiroyuki Kumakura Fumihiko Tachiki Hiroshi Kawaguchi		
Disk Jockey	LEO		
Kei	Meri Mizuhara		
Yuri	Yuri Akitsu		

The OVAs
Character	Japanese	English
Joe	Hiroshi Takemura	Michael Brady
Alfin	Run Sasaki	Juliet Cesario
Talos	Kiyoshi Kobayashi	Dave Underwood
Ricky	Noriko Ohara	Shaun O'Rourke
Dongo	Issei Futamata	Rick Forrester
Episode 1
Eyecatcher	Roger D. Smith (in English)	unchanged
Hume	Iemasa Kayumi	Michael Titterton
Ghellstan	Yuzuru Fujimoto	Michael S. Way
Kabul	Mitsuo Senda	Jim Clark
Barney	Masaaki Tsukada	Jordan Rhodes
Figaro	Daisuke Gouri	Marc Matney
Female Newscaster	Masako Katsuki	Sara Seidman-Vance
Male Newscaster	Shin'ya Ootaki	Bill Shank
Reporter		Scott Simpson
Captain 1	Masashi Ebara	Patrick Humphrey
Warden	Minoru Inaba	
Prisoners	Naoki Makishima Hiroshi Hashimoto Hiroyuki Suzuki Akifumi Endou	Mark Franklin Rick Havoc Ronnie Lamana Jim Leonard Mark McCoy Sean P. O'Connell
Communications Officer		Tony Schnur
Staff Officers		J. David Arnold Larry Tobias
Waitress	Keiko Yamaoka	Pamela Weidner-Houle
Guards		Tyson Harris Thomas Roday
Prison Robot		Steve Wilkins
Assistant		David Woods
Announcer		Lanelle Markgraf
Workers		Nat Burton Lyndon Daverwood
Soldier		Bill Nixon
Pilot		Robert Hodge
Episode 2
Major Tanya	Yoshiko Sakakibara	Sinda Nichols
Colonel Mardo	Kenji Utsumi	Pierre Brulatour
President Elgarno	Mikio Terajima	Michael S. Way
Lieutenant Jimenes	Kiyoyuki Yanada	Rick Havoc
Dr. Carlos	Yasuo Muramatsu	Larry Tobias
Captain 2	Ikuya Sawaki	Paul Johnson
Pilot	Hiroshi Hashimoto	Nat Burton
Hoira	Shouji Ehara	
Officer/Major Diek	Katsumi Suzuki	Lee Taylor
Enlisted Man/Sergeant Wheeler	Hiroyuki Suzuki	Kevin Guthrie

== Novels ==
Crusher Joe 1: Crisis on Solidarity Planet Pizanne (クラッシャージョウ 1 連帯惑星ピザンの危機, Kurasshā Jō 1: Rentai Wakusei Pizan no Kiki)
Asahi Sonorama, ISBN 4-257-76093-1 (November 1977), ISBN 4-257-76920-3 (November 2000)
Crusher Joe 2: Extermination! The Space Pirates Trap (クラッシャージョウ 2 撃滅!宇宙海賊の罠, Kurasshā Jō 2: Gekimetsu! Uchū Kaizoku no Wana)
Asahi Sonorama, ISBN 4-257-76098-2 (January 1978), ISBN 4-257-76925-4 (April 2001)
Crusher Joe 3: The Final Secret of the Milky Way (クラッシャージョウ 3 銀河系最後の秘宝, Kurasshā Jō 3: Gingakei Saigō no Hihō)
Asahi Sonorama, ISBN 4-257-76103-2 (January 1978), ISBN 4-257-76939-4 (July 2001)
Crusher Joe 4: Cave of the Cult of the Dark God (クラッシャージョウ 4 暗黒邪神教の洞窟, Kurasshā Jō 4: Ankoku Jashinkyō no Dōkutsu)
Asahi Sonorama, ISBN 4-257-76109-1 (January 1978), ISBN 4-257-76951-3 (November 2001)
Crusher Joe 5: Treachery Toward the Galactic Empire (クラッシャージョウ 5 銀河帝国への野望, Kurasshā Jō 5: Ginga Teikoku e no Yabō)
Asahi Sonorama, ISBN 4-257-76118-0 (January 1978), ISBN 4-257-76958-0 (February 2002)
Crusher Joe 6: Challenge of the Human-faced Demon Beasts (クラッシャージョウ 6 人面魔獣の挑戦, Kurasshā Jō 6: Jinmen Majū no Chōsen)
Asahi Sonorama, ISBN 4-257-76132-6 (June 1979), ISBN 4-257-76967-X (May 2002)
Crusher Joe 7: The Beautiful Demon King (クラッシャージョウ 7 美しき魔王, Kurasshā Jō 7: Utsukushiki Maō)
Asahi Sonorama, ISBN 4-257-76176-8 (1983), ISBN 4-257-76978-5 (August 2002)
Crusher Joe 8: Kukuru, the Haunted City (クラッシャージョウ 8 悪霊都市ククル, Kurasshā Jō 8: Akuryō Toshi Kukuru)
Part 1: Asahi Sonorama, ISBN 4-257-76501-1 (November 1989), ISBN 4-257-76981-5 (October 2002)
Part 2: Asahi Sonorama, ISBN 4-257-76508-9 (March 1990), ISBN 4-257-76984-X (November 2002)
Crusher Joe 9: The Phantom Beast Wormwood (クラッシャージョウ 9 ワームウッドの幻獣, Kurasshā Jō 9: Wāmuūddo no Genjū)
Asahi Sonorama, ISBN 4-257-77017-1 (October 2003)
Crusher Joe 10: The Holy Virgin Dairon (クラッシャージョウ 10 ダイロンの聖少女, Kurasshā Jō 10: Dairon no Seishōjo)
Asahi Sonorama, ISBN 4-257-77047-3 (26 May 2005)
Crusher Joe Extra 1: Rainbow Hell (クラッシャージョウ 別巻1 虹色の地獄, Kurasshā Jō Bekkan 1: Nijiiro no Jigoku)
Novelization of the movie, Asahi Sonorama, ISBN 4-257-76233-0 (January 1983), ISBN 4-257-76999-8 (February 2003)
Crusher Joe Extra 2: The Doruroi Storm (クラッシャージョウ 別巻2 ドルロイの嵐, Kurasshā Jō Bekkan 2: Doruroi no Arashi)
Asahi Sonorama, ISBN 4-257-77047-3 (26 May 2005)

== Video release ==
The 1983 film version was released on LaserDisc in 1996 with English subtitles. It was released on VHS in the United States by AnimEigo on 27 June 2000 in both dubbed and subtitled versions. A DVD released by AnimEigo on 23 September 2003 contained the original film and both OVA versions. All are now out of print. Discotek acquired the rights to retail the film and OVAs in English in 2016. The film was released on June 20, 2020 while the OVA was released on August 25, 2020.

A version of the 1983 film was released in the UK on VHS, under the name Crushers. Aimed primarily at children, this version was dubbed into English. Particularly violent and sexual references were cut.

== Reception ==
The Encyclopedia of Science Fiction described Crusher Joe as more cynical than many contemporary anime works and criticized its characterization as negligible. Nevertheless, it considered the film a fun and action-packed production, highlighting its abundance of science-fiction and adventure imagery, including a giant space fortress, cyborgs, monsters, spaceship battles and elaborate action sequences. The encyclopedia also noted the film's irreverent tone, exemplified by its cane-wielding villain keeping an alien toad rather than the stereotypical pet cat.

== Video games ==
Crusher Joe: Kanraku Wakusei no Inbou was released in 1994 by Family Soft for the PC-98.
