= The Ultraman =

Japanese anime television series

- Official logo
- ザ☆ウルトラマン
- Genre: Superhero, Kyodai Hero, Kaiju, science fiction
- Directors: Hisayuki Toriumi (chief); Takeyuki Kanda (chief)
- Character designers: Tsuneo Ninomiya
- Mechanical designer: Kunio Okawara (Studio Nue); Shōji Kawamori (Studio Nue)
- Music: Kunio Miyauchi; Toru Fuyuki
- No. of episodes: 50

Production
- Studio: Nippon Sunrise
- Producers: Eiji Tsuburaya; Kazuho Mizuta; Masashi Tadakuma (TBS)
- Production companies: Tsuburaya Productions; TBS

Original release
- Network: JNN (TBS)
- Release: April 4, 1979 – March 26, 1980

The Ultraman (ザ☆ウルトラマン, Za Urutoraman) is a Japanese animated television series co-produced by Tsuburaya Productions and animated by Nippon Sunrise. It is the eighth overall entry in the Ultra Series, the first animated work in the franchise and the first series to air in 4 years after the end of Ultraman Leo. The series aired on Tokyo Broadcasting System on April 4, 1979, to March 26, 1980, lasting a total of 50 episodes.

== Story ==
In the 21st century, various mysterious events occur on Earth, causing monsters to appear all of a sudden. EGG3 officer Chouichirou Hikari was scouted to join the Science Defense Squad on Earth but while on his way back, he was bonded to Ultraman Joneus, an Ultra-Person of U-40 who was sent by his brethren to fight against the monster threats and alien invasions. This allows the youth to become an Ultraman against countless enemies while keeping a secret identity from his fellow members.

Midway through the series, both Hikari and Joneus die while fighting the Spirit Parasite. They are taken to the Ultra Planet U-40 to be resurrected, and while there, discover the Ultra People's connection to the Earth in the past. They also help to repel the invading Badel People, and to reclaim the stolen Ultra-mind.

Starting from episode 28, Daisuke Gondo becomes a new captain to the SDS. Despite their rocky start, the team learns to accept him due to his great intuition and brotherly instinct. Amia would return to Earth to warn Hikari and the SDS of the alien invasion of the Heller Empire, a renegade faction of Ultra People that invaded their home world and saw Earth as their next target due to Joneus's involvement. The Heller Empire was led by Heller, who was banished due to his misuse of the Ultra-mind for immortality. The SDS were given the Ultria, an ancient battleship made by the Ultra People to counter invasion attempts made by the Heller Army. In the four final episodes, Heller sent a full-scale invasion on Earth to wipe out humanity after fearing that they would cooperate with the remaining Ultra People. The SDS disobeyed the Earth Self Defense Army to go into space, joining forces with the remaining U-40 resistances to form the U Fleet and attacked the Titan Base on Saturn to prevent more invasion forces from coming to Earth. On U-40, the SDS made a risky attempt to sneak into the Heller City to weaken its defense as the U Fleet attacked Heller's forces in the planet's outer atmosphere. When the SDS were about to be killed by Mac Datar, Hikari's secret was exposed to save his comrades before joining the remaining seven Ultras in foiling Heller's attempts to escape. With Amia and the Wiseman being rescued, Heller died in the ensuing explosion as U-40 celebrated their victory. Joneus finally separated from Hikari and spent several months to observe Earth with his sister Amia. Once assuring that peace had returned, they bid farewell to the SDS and promised to return when the Earth's safety is threatened once more.

== Staff ==
Opening Credits
Producers	Noboru Tsuburaya, Kazuho Mitsuda, Masaru Tadakuma
Music by	Kunio Miyauchi & Toru Fuyuki
Lyrics	Yu Aku
Theme Song Performed by	Isao Sasaki
Published in	Shogakukan's "Tv-Kun" and Other Learning Magazines Kodansha's "Tv Magazine" and Other Learning Magazines
Animation Supervision & Character Design	Tsuneo Ninomiya
Designers / Monster Concept	Akihiko Takahashi & Osamu Yamaguchi
Chief Directors / Storyboarding	Hisayuki Toriumi, Takeyuki Kanda
Production Producer	Yasuo Shibue
Animation Produced by	Nippon Sunrise
Produced by	Tsuburaya Productions, Tokyo Broadcasting System

End Credits
Written by	Keiichi Abe, Soji Yoshikawa, Hiroyuki Hoshiyama; Bunzo Wakatsuki, Yoshihisa Araki, Keisuke Fujikawa; Yasushi Hirano, Shiro Azusazawa, Yuki Miyata
Directed by	Masahisa Ishida, Junyasu Furukawa, Takao Shitsuji, Hideyoshi Oshika, Takashi Ano, Katsuyuki Tsuji, Masami Yagioka, Hiromichi Matano, Osamu Sekita
Storyboard	Yuji Nunokawa, Kazuo Terada, Asahi Yahiro; Seiji Okuda, Soji Yoshikawa, Motosuke Takahashi; Kohei Matsuura, Noboru Ishiguro, Toru Sakata; Mitsuru Hikita, Takeshi Shirato, Tsutomu Yamaguchi; Kazuho Mitsuda, Masaoka Fujioka, Toru Yoshida; Kazuo Yamazaki, Ryosuke Takahashi, Yoshiyuki Tomino
In Charge of Literature	Kazuichi Tsurumi
Mechanical Design	Kunio Okakawa, Studio Nue
Art	Mitsuaki Nakamura, Nobuto Sakamoto, Kazuo Miyagawa, Shin Sato, Torio Arai
Director of Animation	Kazuo Nakamura
Animation by	Sunrise Studio, Waap, Green Box, Anime R, Tiger & Nakamura Productions
Monster Concept	Minoru Kujirai, Fumio Ogawa, Yoshio Tsuburaya, Yasumi Asahi, Seiichi Saito, Masahiko Watanabe
Color Designation	Hiroshi Wakao, Atsuko Oikawa, Shinichi Hatori, Kazumi Matsui, Hiroshi Hasegawa, Sachiyo Osawa, Yayoi Suzuki
Ink And Paint	Shaft, Green BOX, Studio Deen, Kuma Productions, Studio Juffs
Backgrounds	Mascot, Production Eye, Big Studios, Artland, Art Take 1, Magic House, Baku Productions, Studio Apple
Special Effects	Michiaki Doi, Masanori Yamazaki, Green Box, Takao Tanaka, Hiroshi Kazao
Rostrum Camera	Asahi Productions and Zenji Furukawa
Editing by	Tomoaki Tsurubuchi, Fumio Otachi, Tsurubuchi Films, Yukio Watanabe, Fumiei Kataishi
Titles	Studio Try
Film Processing	Tokyo Laboratories
Audio Director	Toshimi Toriumi
Mixing	Manji Nanbu
Production Coordinator	Hisayoshi Takahashi
Recorded at	Niisaka Recording
Production Managers	Noboru Mano, Keiichi Kobayashi, Akira Machida, Yoshihide Fujita, Eiichi Endo, Hideo Hayashi, Masahiko Matsuo, Eizo Takahashi, Masami Yagioka, Mashiro Ueda, Tadayoshi Kusari, Setsuo Fukada, Katsushi Kaniyama
Desk	Yoshiyuki Yoshina, Noboru Mano
Planning Desk	Naoyuki Eto
In Charge of Production	Yoshikazu Tochihira

== English Dubbing Staff ==
A New Hero is Born!! ~ Chase The Mysterious Red Cloud!!
Staff
Executive Producer	Mark Cohen
Produced by	Sydney L. Caplan
Directed by	Tom Weiner
Voices	Tom Weiner, Joe Perry, Barbara Goodson, Steve Kramer
Screenplay	Sidney L. Caplan & Tom Weiner
Music	Screen Music West
Post Production Supervision	Wally Soul, Filmkraft
Sound	Quality Sound
Produced by	Associates Entertainment International

A Star of Evil is Coming!!
English version Presented by	WWOR TV
Introduced by	Tetsuko Kuroyanagi
Voice Director	William Ross
Produced by	Frontier Enterprises
Sponsored by	Bandai America

To The Ultra Star!!
Voices	Gary Morgan, Gladys Enright, Susan Harry Sprang, Sean Reily, Michael Guillian, Walter Schafer
Written and Directed by	Jeff Segal
Associate Producer	Ken Fukui
Casting Consultants	Buck and Margaret Kartalian
Dialogue, Music, Editing Assistants & Engineering	Terry Porter, Mike McDonald, Lee Williams, Denis Ricotta, Don Harris, Robert Miller
Music Composed & Performed by	Mark McKinniss, Bill Mutter, Ron Peters, Wade Short
P.A. & Production Secretary	Martyn Segal, Roberta Miles
ADR Production	Ryder Sound Services
Music Recorded at	Trax Recording Studios
Produced by	Lionsgate Home Entertainment

== Episodes ==
1. The Hero is Born (新しいヒーローの誕生!!, Atarashī Hīrō no Tanjō!!)
2. The Secret of the Shining Pendant (光るペンダントの秘密, Hikaru Pendanto no Himitsu)
3. Sound of the Flute in the Setting Sun (草笛が夕日に流れる時, Kusabue ga Yūhi ni Nagareru Toki)
4. The Mystery of the Red Cloud (謎の赤い雲を追え!!, Nazo no Akai Kumo o Oe!!)
5. The Adventure of the Passenger (パッセージャー号地底突破!!, Passējā-gō Chitei Toppa!!)
6. Escape From the Deepest Sea (燃える深海への挑戦, Moeru Shinkai e no Chōsen)
7. Problems for Pig (攻撃指令!目標はピグ!!, Kōgeki Shirei! Mokuhyō wa Pigu!!)
8. The Secret of Hikari (ヒカリ隊員の秘密が盗まれた!?, Hikari Taiin no Himitsu ga Nusuma reta!?)
9. The Horror in the Old Castle (目覚めた古代生物の恐怖!!, Mezameta Kodai Seibutsu no Kyōfu!!)
10. Strategy of the Monster Mirage (見えたぞ! まぼろしの怪獣が..., Mieta zo! Maboroshi no Kaijū ga...)
11. Old Friendship Revived in the Himalayas (科学警備隊へのチャレンジ!!, Kagaku Keibitai e no Charenji!!)
12. The Sad Roar Goes On and On (怪獣とピグだけの不思議な会話, Kaijū to Pigu Dake no Fushigina Kaiwa)
13. The Resurrection of the Legend (よみがえった湖の悲しい伝説, Yomigaetta Mizuumi no Kanashii Densetsu)
14. The Devil Star Has Come! (悪魔の星が来た!!, Akuma no Hoshi ga Kita!!)
15. Ultraman and Hikari (君がウルトラマンだ, Kimi ga Urutoraman da)
16. The Rebirth of the Kingmore, the Prehistoric Bird (生きていた幻の鳥, Ikiteita Maboroshi no Tori)
17. Betamy Has Disappeared! (ベータミーが消えた!!, Bētamī ga Kieta!!)
18. The Mysterious Monster Island (謎のモンスター島, Nazo no Monsutā Shima)
19. This is the Planet Where Ultraman was Born - Part 1 (これがウルトラの星だ!! 第1部, Kore ga Urutora no Hoshi da!! Dai 1-bu)
20. This is the Planet Where Ultraman was Born - Part 2 (これがウルトラの星だ!! 第2部, Kore ga Urutora no Hoshi da!! Dai 2-bu)
21. This is the Planet Where Ultraman was Born - Part 3 (これがウルトラの星だ!! 第3部, Kore ga Urutora no Hoshi da!! Dai 3-bu)
22. The Mysterious Space in the South Sea (南海の怪しい空間, Nankai no Ayashī Kūkan)
23. Supersonic War Breaks Out (超音速の対決, Chō Onsoku no Taiketsu)
24. Twin Sister of Mutsumi (ふたりのムツミ隊員, Futari no Mutsumi Taiin)
25. The Devil Flower (悪魔の花園, Akuma no Hanazono)
26. Earth's Greatest Crisis (地球最大の危機!!, Chikyū Saidai no Kiki!!)
27. The Island of the Monsters (怪獣島浮上!!, Kaijū Shima Fujō!!)
28. A New Captain Takes Command (新キャップが来た!!, Shin Kyappu ga Kita!!)
29. The UFO With the Devil-Heart Attacks! (悪魔のUFO大襲来, Akuma no Yūfō Dai Shūrai)
30. The Moving Skeleton (動きだした巨大化石, Ugokidashita Kyodai Kaseki)
31. The Woman Fighter From Ultra (ウルトラの女戦士, Urutora no On'na Senshi)
32. Object "X" (宇宙からの物体X, Uchū Kara no Buttai X)
33. Duel With Ultraman (GO!! マグマの決死圏, GO!! Maguma no Kesshi-ken)
34. Break-Out at Prison Planet! Part 1: The Monsters are Loose (盗まれた怪獣収容星（前編）, Nusuma reta Kaijū Shūyō Hoshi (Zenpen))
35. Break-Out at Prison Planet! Part 2: A Planet is Hijacked (盗まれた怪獣収容星（後編）, Nusuma reta Kaijū Shūyō Hoshi (Kōhen))
36. The Snow-Queen From Outer Space (宇宙から来た雪女, Uchū Kara Kita Yukion'na)
37. Danger on U-40 (ウルトラの星U40の危機!! ウルトリアの謎?, Urutora no Hoshi U40 no Kiki! ! Urutoria no Nazo?)
38. The Great Ultra War (ウルトラ大戦争!! 巨大戦闘艦ウルトリア出撃, Urutora Dai Sensō! ! Kyodai Sentō-kan Urutoria Shutsugeki)
39. The Hell Cat Appears (ねらわれた巨大戦闘艦ウルトリア, Nerawareta Kyodai Sentō-kan Urutoria)
40. The Boy From the Green Planet (怪獣を連れた少年, Kaijū o Tsureta Shōnen)
41. The Day Ultraman Fought Against Ultraman (激突!! ウルトラマン対ウルトラマン, Gekitotsu! Urutoraman tai Urutoraman)
42. A Plan to Capture Ultraman (ウルトラマン生けどり作戦, Urutoraman Ike Dori Sakusen)
43. Monchi Became a Monster (怪獣になったモンキ!?, Kaijū ni Natta Monki!?)
44. The Twin Craft of Ultria and the Monster "Spader" (ウルトリアが二つに割れた!?, Urutoria ga Futatsu ni Wareta!?)
45. Pig Becomes a Walking Bomb (爆弾を抱いたピグ, Bakudan o Daita Pigu)
46. The Remote-Control Monster (よみがえれムツミ, Yomigaere Mutsumi)
47. To the Planet of Ultra - Part 1: Advice of the Female Warrior (ウルトラの星へ!!第1部 女戦士の情報, Urutora no Hoshi e!! Dai 1-bu On'na Senshi no Jōhō)
48. To the Planet of Ultra - Part 2: Assault on the Titan Base (ウルトラの星へ!!第2部 前線基地撃滅, Urutora no Hoshi e!! Dai 2-bu Zensen Kichi Gekimetsu)
49. To the Planet of Ultra - Part 3: The Great Battle of U-40 (ウルトラの星へ!!第3部 U(ウルトラ)艦隊大激戦, Urutora no Hoshi e!! Dai 3-bu U (Urutora) Kantai Dai Gekisen)
50. To the Planet of Ultra - Part 4: Victory for Peace (ウルトラの星へ!!完結編 平和への勝利, Urutora no Hoshi e!! Kanketsu-hen Heiwa e no Shōri)

== Songs ==
=== Theme Songs ===
- Opening theme: "The Ultraman"
  - Song: Aku
  - Composition and Arrangement: Miyauchi Kunio
  - Song: Isao Sasaki and Columbia Yurikakai
- Ending theme: "Brave Men of Love"
  - Lyrics: Aku
  - Composition and Arrangement: Kunio Miyauchi
  - Songs: Isao Sasaki

This serves as the first case of an entry in the Ultra Series having an ending sequence. Performed by BGM staff who had previously composed the theme song for "Ultra Seven". Both songs were recorded in Los Angeles, as was the in-play music.

=== Insert Songs ===
- "Ultraman Hymn"
  - Lyrics: Kazuho Mitsuda
  - Composition and Arrangement: Toru Fuyuki
  - Song: Isao Sasaki

Sasaki, who was in charge of the song, made it the most difficult song he had ever sung.

- "Star of Ultra"
  - Lyrics: Tani Noboru
  - Composition and Arrangement: Toru Fuyuki
  - Song: Columbia Torigokai
- "Song of Mutsumi"
  - Lyrics-Kazuho Mitsuda
  - Composition: Noboru Tani
  - Arrangement: Hiroshi Takada
  - Song: Mitsuko Horie
- "Super Murdoch"
  - Lyrics and Composition: Tani Noboru
  - Arrangement: Hirotaka Takada
  - Song: Isao Sasaki
- "Our Science Garrison"
  - Lyrics: Kazuho Mitsuda
  - Composition: Noboru Tani
  - Arrangement: Hirotaka Takada
  - Songs: Isao Sasaki
- "Robot Pig's Song"
  - Lyrics: Noboru Tani
  - Composition: Toru Fuoki
  - Arrangement: Masahito Maruyama
  - Song: Junpei Takiguchi
- "Tomorrow ..."
  - Lyrics and Composition: Noboru Tani
  - Arrangement: Hiroshi Takada
  - Song: Takashi Toyama

It was used in Episode 18, and in Episode 23, the instrument was used.

- "Monster Requiem"
  - Lyrics: Kazuho Mitsuda
  - Composition and Arrangement: Toru Fuyuki
  - Songs: Isao Sasaki

In the 15th episode of the next series, Ultraman 80, Emi Johno was used in the scene singing a lullaby to the monster Mue and in 44 the instrument was used in the scene where 80 and the Delusion Ultra Seven fight. In addition, the "popular monster large parade" of "5 Nights Series Super TV" (March 26–30, 1984, Ultraman Taro, Mirrorman, Fireman, Jumborg Ace) digest version had been featured. It is also used as an ending.

== English versions ==
In the United States, there have been two feature-length movie compilations: The Adventures of Ultraman (1981), and Ultraman II: The Further Adventures of Ultraman (1983). The Adventures of Ultraman was a feature-length film produced by Tsuburaya Productions specifically for the English-language market. The film is composed of edited footage from several episodes of the series. The storyline was rewritten for this adaptation with a new script by Jeff Segal and music composed by Mark McKinniss. Ultraman II was a dub of the first four episodes co-produced by Tsuburaya Productions and Associates Entertainment International. Despite the title, it has no continuity with the previous English dub of the series. Although the translation is closer to the original Japanese scripts than the first movie, the characters' names were still changed (although, the names given to the characters are not the same ones used in the previous dub). The order of the third and fourth episodes were also switched.

On April 5, 1980, episode 14 of The Ultraman aired on U.S. national television when New York superstation WOR-TV Channel 9 (now WWOR) aired it as the first part of "Japan Tonight!", a special seven-hour block of programming from TBS (Tokyo Broadcasting System), hosted by actor Telly Savalas. Japanese actress/author/talk show host Tetsuko Kuroyanagi introduced the episode surrounded by assorted Ultraman toys and merchandise while explaining to the American audience just who Ultraman is, "It's very, very popular in Japan - He's like your Superman". The episode was dubbed into English by William Ross (Frontier Enterprises) in Japan and was sponsored by Bandai America.

== Home media ==
In 2018, the series was released on the streaming service Toku.

In July 2020, Shout! Factory announced to have struck a multi-year deal with Alliance Entertainment and Mill Creek, with the blessings of Tsuburaya and Indigo, that granted them the exclusive SVOD and AVOD digital rights to the Ultra series and films (1,100 TV episodes and 20 films) acquired by Mill Creek the previous year. The Ultraman, amongst other titles, will stream in the United States and Canada through Shout! Factory TV and Tokushoutsu.

It was released in the United States on DVD September 14, 2021, by Mill Creek Entertainment.
