= Run Sasaki =

Japanese voice actress (born 1956)

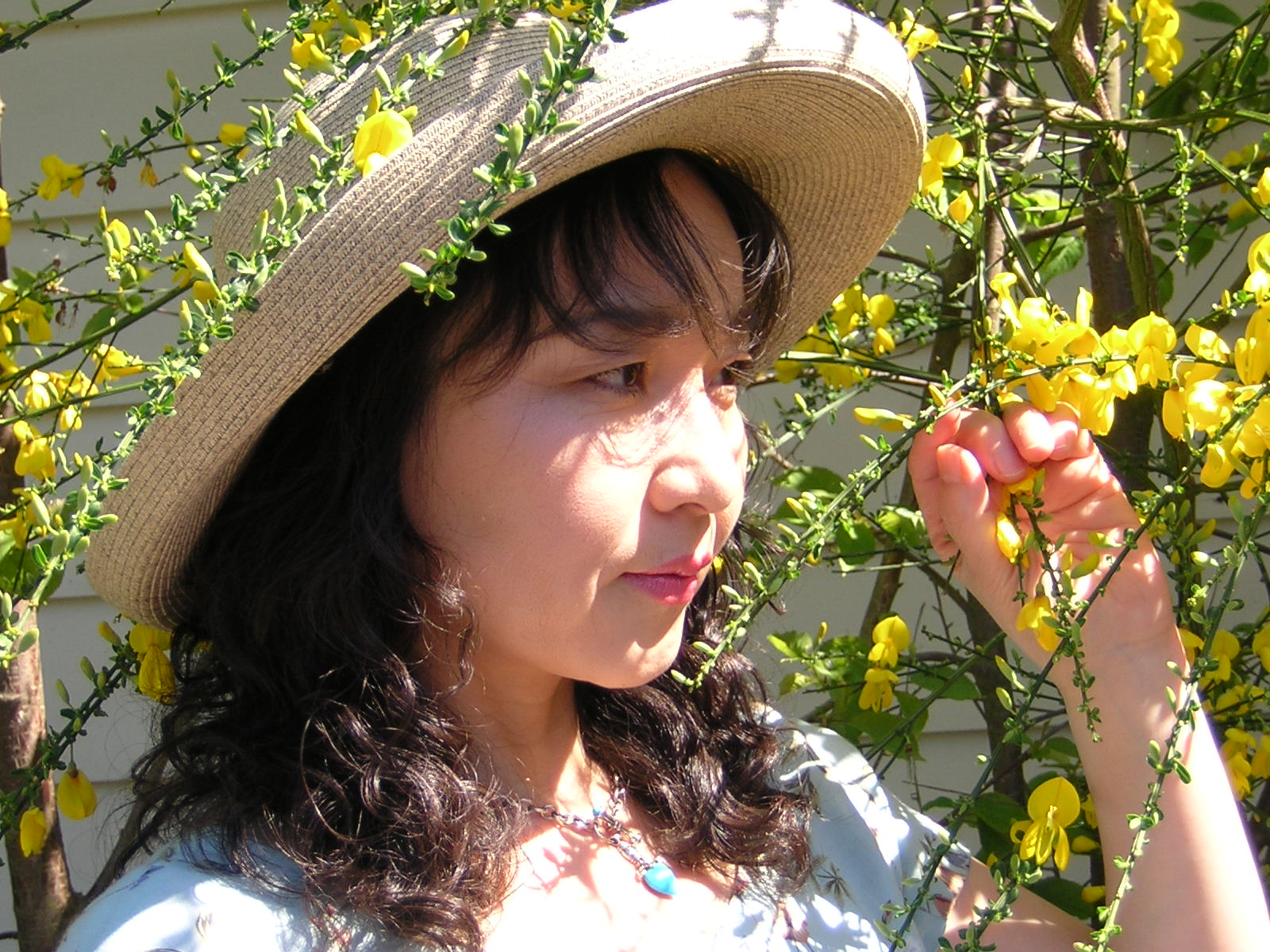
- Born: March 21, 1956 (age 70); Tokyo, Japan
- Occupation: Voice actress
- Years active: 1979-present

Run Sasaki (佐々木 るん, Sasaki Run; March 21, 1956) is a veteran Japanese voice actress. Born in Japan, she now lives in Seattle in the United States.

== History ==
Sasaki moved to the US and lives in Seattle since 2000.

== Anime ==
=== Movies ===
- Crusher Joe (6th Japan Anime Grand prize movie) (Alfin)
- The Super Dimension Fortress Macross (Vannessa)
- Ohayou Spank (Anna(dog))
- The five star stories (Isha)
- 2112: The Birth of Doraemon(wife)

=== TV series animation ===
- Sarutobi Sasuke (Princess Yukino)
- Ultra Grandma (baby)
- God Mars (boy Mars)
- The Super Dimension Fortress Macross (Vanessa)
- The Super Dimension Century Orguss (Mimsy Rath)
- Ginga Hyōryū Vifam (maruro)
- Aura Battler Dunbine (Elle)
- Princess Sarah (gertrude)
- Blue Comet SPT Layzner (Karura)
- Pretty Soldier Sailor Moon (Naru's Mother/Morga)
- Blue Comet SPT Layzner (Frevy)
- Dancougar - Super Beast Machine God (Seacat)
- Showa Ahozoshi Akanuke ichiban
- Hikari no Densetsu (Maria)
- High School! Kimengumi (Iko Kawa)
- Izumo (Himiko)
- Shonen Ashibe (Ka-chan)
- City Hunter (Reiko Yuuki)
- City Hunter (Midori O'hara)
- Oishinbo (Natsuko)
- Anpanman (Tamago-chan)
- YAWARA! (Bellkence)
- Yamato Takeru (Yamato Kaoru)
- Crayon Shin-chan
- Brain Powered (Kant)
- Mobile Fighter G Gundam (Marion)
- Astro boy (Robiet)
- Urusei Yatsura (Diane)
- Hello Kitty (Kitty's Mommy)
- Sanrio Blue Bird (Goddess)
- Seraphim Call

== Voice over for Hollywood movies ==
- CHiPs (Kathy by Tina Gayle)
- City Hunter (Carol Wan)
- Dragons Forever (Wen Mei-ling by Pauline Yeung)
- Get Smart (Agent #99)
- Harlem Nights (Dominic LaRue)
- La Cage aux Folles (Andrea by Luisa Maneri)
- Les Misérables (Cossete)
- Love Boat (Julie MacCoy by Lauren Tewes)
- Mr. Vampire (Ting-ting by Moon Lee)
- Ordinary People (Karen by Dinah Manoff)
- Police Story (May by Maggie Cheung)
- Rush Hour (Tania Johnson by Elizabeth Peña)
- thirtysomething (Nancy by Patricia Wettig)
- Twin Dragons (Barbara by Maggie Cheung)
- Zapped! (Heather Thomas)

== Games ==
- Sony PlayStation Kowloon's Gate (Kowloon Kid(Original Hero voice))
- SEGA Jan Jan Koi shimasho! (Nana Motoki)
- Marie's Atelier (Killy)
