= Yoroi-Shinden Samurai Troopers =

Japanese anime television series

- Key visual for the series
- 鎧真伝サムライトルーパー
- Created by: Hajime Yatate
- Directed by: Yōichi Fujita
- Screenplay by: Shōgo Mutō
- Character designers: Yuhei Murota; Tsubasa Kotobuki
- Music by: Shūji Katayama
- Country of origin: Japan
- Original language: Japanese
- No. of episodes: 24

Production
- Editor: Kumiko Sakamoto
- Studio: Sunrise
- Producers: Kiyoshi Tsukamoto; Keita Takao
- Production companies: Bandai Namco Filmworks; Yoroi-Shinden Samurai Troopers Project (Note: Consisting of various companies)

Original release
- Networks: Tokyo MX, Kansai TV, BS11
- Release: January 5 – September 22, 2026

Related
- Ronin Warriors

Samurai Troopers, known in Japan as Yoroi-Shinden Samurai Troopers (Japanese: 鎧真伝サムライトルーパー, Hepburn: Yoroi Shinden Samurai Torūpā; lit. 'The True Legend of the Armored Samurai Troopers'), is a 2026 Japanese anime television series produced by Sunrise, serving as a sequel to the studio's 1988 television series Ronin Warriors, and aired from January to September 2026.

It is a legacy sequel to the original anime, whereas the OVA sequels (Gaiden, Legend of the Inferno Armor, and Message) are considered a parallel universe.

== Characters ==
=== Protagonists ===
==== Third Generation Ronins ====
Gai
Voiced by: Hiiro Ishibashi
Gai (凱) is the son of Ramaga who rebels against his father and defects to the DST and their defense of Earth. He uses the Red Armor of Blazing (灼熱の鎧, Shakutnetsu no Yoroi) and bears the virtue of Jin (仁; 'benevolence', 'righteousness').
Musashi Hojo
Voiced by: Ayumu Murase
Musashi Hojo (北条 武蔵, Hōjō Musashi) is a good-natured member of the DST assigned to a corrupt group that Gai easily dispatches. He uses the Cyan Armor of Waterfall (水簾の鎧, Suiren no Yoroi) and bears the virtue of Shin (信; 'Trust'). His surname is likely derived from Hōjō Ujiyasu, head of the Odawara Hōjō clan during the warring states period.
Yamato Hojo
Voiced by: Shunsuke Takeuchi
Yamato Hojo (北条 大和, Hōjō Yamato) is Musashi's older brother. He originally tried to join the DST before Ramaga's invasion but was rejected for his insubordinate nature. He uses the Orange Armor of Wilderness (荒野の鎧, Kōya no Yoroi) and bears the virtue of Gi (義; lit. 'Justice'). His surname is likely derived from Hōjō Ujiyasu, head of the Odawara Hōjō clan during the warring states period.
Kaito Uesugi
Voiced by: Junya Enoki
Kaito Uesugi (上杉 魁人, Uesugi Kaito) is a music enthusiast who first tried to join the DST before Ramaga's invasion but washed out. He has a vendetta against Ramaga as the Brave Ten's invasion of Earth caused his grandmother's death. He uses the Blue Armor of the Sky (蒼穹の鎧, Sōkyū no Yoroi) and bears the virtue of Chi (智; 'Wisdom'). His surname is likely derived from Uesugi Kenshin.
Shion Ishida
Voiced by: Kentarō Kumagai
Shion Ishida (石田 紫音, Ishida Shion) is the former teammate of Ryusei and the original designer of the armor gears for the DST before resigning over the death of the second generation Ronins. He succeeds Ryusei in using the Green Armor of Flashing (閃光の鎧, Senkō no Yoroi) and bears the virtue of Rei (礼; lit. 'Courtesy'). His surname is likely derived from Ishida Mitsunari.

==== Second Generation Ronins ====
Ryusei Oda
Voiced by: Toshiki Masuda
Ryusei Oda (織田 龍成, Oda Ryūsei) served as the leader of the second generation of Ronins in the Defense Special Incident Countermeasures Task-force, known as DST. Originally a protege of Ryo Sanada, he is responsible for training the next generation of Troopers. He is described as a dependable older brother figure to the team. His surname is likely derived from Oda Nobunaga, one of the most influential warlords in Japanese history and known as the first of the "three great unifiers" of Japan.
Shun Shimazu
Voiced by: Yūya Hirose
Shun Shimazu (島津 瞬, Shimazu Shun) was a member of the second generation of Ronins in the DST who perished before the events of the series. He wore the red Armor of Heat (炎天の鎧, Yaten no Yoroi). His surname is likely derived from Shimazu Yoshihiro, a notable warlord of Japan's Warring States period from Kyushu.
Tadayoshi Kato
Voiced by: Kentaro Tone
Tadayoshi Kato (加藤 忠義, Kato Tadayoshi) was a member of the second generation of Ronin in the DST who perished before the events of the series. He wore the orange Armor of Scorched Earth (焦土の鎧, Shōdo no Yoroi). His surname is likely derived from Kato Kiyomasa.
Seiun Kuroda
Voiced by: Misato Matsuoka
Seiun Kuroda (黒田 清雲, Kuroda Seiun) was a member of the second generation of Ronin in the DST who perished before the events of the series. She is the first female Ronin and wore the blue Armor of Blizzard (吹雪の鎧, Fubuki no Yoroi). Her surname is likely derived from Kuroda Kanbei.

=== Antagonists ===
==== Ramaga ====
Voiced by: Katsuyuki Konishi
Ramaga (羅真我), also titled Ramaga, the Sovereign Archdemon (妖邪帝王・羅真我, Yōja Teiō Ramaga), is the new emperor of the Neatherrealm who rose to fill the void following the death of Talpa. He seeks to conquer Earth and use the body of his Human son, Gai, as a new vessel for his power. His current vessel is none other than Ryo.

==== Ten Braves ====
A group of villains in the sequel series, followers of Ramaga who seek to conquer Earth. Likely modeled after the Sanada Ten Braves of Japanese literature.

1. Sasuke (サスケ) Voiced by: Sato Takuya
2. Kamanosuke (カマノスケ) Voiced by: Takuma Terashima
3. Saizo (サイゾウ, Saizō) Voiced by: Kohsuke Toriumi
4. Seikai Nyudoh (セイカイニュードー, Seikai Nyūdō) Voiced by: Sugita Tomokazu
5. Isa Nyudoh (イサニュードー, Isa Nyūdō) Voiced by: Kōhei Amasaki
6. Nezu (ネヅ, Nezu) Voiced by: Kenichi Suzumura
7. Anayama (アナヤマ) Voiced by: Chiharu Sawashiro
8. Unno (ウンノ) Voiced by: Ryota Takeuchi
9. Kakei (カケイ) Voiced by: Daichi Endo
10. Mochizuki (モチヅキ) Voiced by: Toshiki Kumagai

==== Yashima-no-Sagume ====
Voiced by: Maaya Sakamoto
Yashima-no-Sagume (ヤシマノサグメ, Yashima no Sagume), is a goddess of the Divine World who aids the third generation Ronins in their mission to stop Ramaga, but secretly holds her own agenda.

==== The Warrior Beasts ====
The servants of Sagume who do her bidding to further her goals. Presumably based on the Four Symbols of Chinese mythology.

1. Inmei (インメイ) Voiced by: Takehito Koyasu – He is dispatched by Sagume to aid the third generation Ronins in recovering White Blaze.
2. Gomei (ゴメイ) Voiced by: Tomoaki Maeno
3. Gaimei (ガイメイ) Voiced by: Hiroshi Shirokuma
4. Shimei (シメイ) Voiced by: Aya Endō

== Production ==
The series was announced on June 11, 2025. It is produced by Sunrise and directed by Yōichi Fujita, with Shōgo Mutō handling series composition and episode scripts, character designs by Yuhei Murota, villain designs by Tsukasa Kotoboki, Yoroi Gear design by Takuya Suzuki with original Yoroi Gear design concepts by Hideo Okamoto and Shūji Katayama composing the music. The series aired in two split-cours, with the first cours from January 6 to March 24, 2026, with the second cours from July 7 to September 22, 2026 of the same year, on Tokyo MX and other networks.

For the first cours, the opening theme song is "Yoake" (Dawn), performed by Blank Paper, while the ending theme song is "Power", performed by One or Eight. For the second cours, the opening theme song is "Bad Idenshi" (BAD遺伝子; Bad Gene), performed by Dannie May, while the ending theme song is "Bakemon" (ばけもん), performed by Karanoah. Crunchyroll is streaming the series.
