= Meat Love =

1989 film by Jan Švankmajer

Meat Love is a 1989 Czechoslovak animated short film directed and animated by Jan Švankmajer. It appears as a commercial in Švankmajer's feature-length film Little Otik. It has also been shown on MTV.

== Plot ==
A knife chops two slices off a chunk of fresh meat. The first slice, using a nearby spoon as a hand mirror, admires itself. Similar admiration is expressed by the second slice, which slaps the first slice on its 'rear', causing it to cry out and retreat coyly behind a tea-towel. The second slice switches on the radio, and persuades its companion to dance 'cheek to cheek' to the sound of an old 1920s recording. One slice jumps into a plate of flour and teasingly 'splashes' the other. Soon, the two slices are writhing ecstatically in the flour. Their passion is short-lived, however, as almost immediately afterwards they are skewered and fried.
