= Blue Sonnet =

Japanese manga series

- Crimson Fang Blue Sonnet
- Cover of volume 4 of the Blue Sonnet manga.

紅い牙 ブルーソネット (Akai Kiba Burū Sonetto)
- Genre: Action, Adventure, Science fiction
- Manga
- Written by: Masahiro Shibata
- Published by: Hakusensha
- Magazine: Hana to Yume
- Original run: 1981 – 1987
- Volumes: 19
- Original video animation
- Directed by: Takeyuki Kanda
- Produced by: Daisaburō Hayashi; Shōji Muronaga; Kenichi Yoshizaka
- Written by: Seiji Matsuoka; Kōichi Mizuide
- Music by: GO!
- Studio: Mushi Productions; Random (#1–2); Tatsunoko (#3–5)
- Licensed by: NA: Central Park Media; UK: Manga Entertainment
- Released: 16 July 1989 – 25 June 1990
- Runtime: 30 minutes each
- Episodes: 5
- icon

Crimson Fang Blue Sonnet (Japanese: 紅い牙 ブルーソネット, Hepburn: Akai Kiba Burū Sonetto) is a 19-volume manga series by Masahiro Shibata which ran in Hana to Yume magazine from 1981 to 1987 as part of the Akai Kiba series of stories. A five episode anime OVA series was adapted from the manga by Mushi Production and released in 1989. The OAV series was licensed and released on VHS and LaserDisc in North America by Central Park Media in 1990. A dubbed version was released on VHS by Manga Entertainment in 1997.

== Characters ==
Lan Komatsuzaki (小松崎 蘭, Komatsuzaki Ran)
Voiced by: Waka Kanda
Lan was in a plane crash with her parents just after she was born, and she was raised by wolves for five years. She possess the latent esper abilities which identify her as the "Crimson Fang".
Sonnet Barge (ソネット·バージ, Sonetto Bāji)
Voiced by: Hiromi Tsuru
Sonnet is a 16-year-old esper cyborg soldier with silver hair (though it is blue in the OAV) who works as a scout for Talon. Her mother is Puerto Rican and her father is Russian, and she was raised in the slums of New York. When she was about 13 years old, her latent esper abilities began randomly manifesting themselves, causing people to label her a "witch" or a "devil child", and this caused her mother to have to turn to prostitution for money.
She was tricked into believing her mother was going to be killed, which caused her latent esper powers to fully manifest. Because of this, she now works as a scout for Talon, mercilessly hunting down espers such as Lan. Her interaction and blooming friendship with Lan and others at the school, however, have caused her to remember her humanity and she begins to question her loyalties to Talon. She finally learns from Lan's boyfriend Bird what real love is.

Dr. Josef Merekes (ヨゼフ・メレケス, Yosefu Merekesu)
Voiced by: Ichirō Nagai
Dr. Merekes, a German scientist of Jewish descent who manages the cyborg division of Talon. He is a recognized authority in cybernetic engineering, and is the one responsible for Sonnet's and Bird's cyborg capabilities. While he is generally a cool-headed person, his growing parental love for Sonnet is his eventual undoing.
Wataru Komatsuzaki (小松崎 亘, Komatsuzaki Wataru)
Voiced by: Nozomu Sasaki
A first year student at Seiryō Academy who looked up to Bird. He feels responsible for Ran's injuries, and thinks that her powers are caused in part by the blood transfusion she received. He is always helping her.
Jin Kiryuu (桐生 仁, Kiryū Jin)
Voiced by: Tesshō Genda
Jin is a novelist. After learning about Talon after being involved in an incident with Lan, he supports her however he can.
Shuuichi Torigai (鳥飼修一, Torigai Shūichi)
Voiced by: Masashi Hironaka
Often nicknamed Bird, he is a delinquent offered room and board at Seiryō Academy in exchange for working there in the dining hall. He was good friends with Lan, but Talon kills him. They then take his remains and turn him into the cyborg RX-606, and he seeks out Lan again.
Yuri Onagara (小半由里, Onagara Yuri)
Voiced by: Emi Shinohara
The daughter of Professor Onagara and a powerful esper whose abilities include clairvoyance, telepathy, and precognition. Due to a fiery incident in her past, she is unable to see, hear, or speak due to the burns she received. She is currently an ally of Lan and intent on attacking Talon.
Daisuke Kishima (杵島大介, Kishima Daisuke)
Voiced by: Nobuo Tobita
Daisuke is the son of Jin Kiryuu and a student at Ōsei Academy.
Naru Haibara (榛原奈留, Haibara Naru)
Voiced by: Rei Sakuma
A student at Ōsei Academy. She works in the library and is Lan's best friend. She has been raised as a foster daughter by the Haibara family. She has a crush on Daisuke.

=== Others ===
- Dr. Kaburagi (Miyoko Asō)
- Kyouko Sodeki (Mari Yokō)
- Tsunaga (Kōzō Shioya)
- Mikura (Kōichi Kitamura)
- Okano (Seiko Nakano)
- Ina (Issei Futamata)
- Yumi (Yuko Minaguchi)
- Editor Kouji Kubo (Kazumi Tanaka)
- Race Track Announcer (Yukimasa Kishino)
- Researcher (Hideyuki Umezu)
- Guard (Junji Kitajima)
- Doctor (Hiroyuki Satō)
- Squad Leader (Hirohiko Kakegawa)

== Story ==
The opening credits for each episode show Sonnet's former life and give hints about her powers. In the battle between the two powerful espers, Sonnet starts to rediscover her humanity, while Lan has to fight to keep her humanity, and control the Crimson Fang powers.

No.	Title	Original release date
1	"Directive 1: The Pursuer"; Transliteration: "Shirei Nanbā Wan: Tsuisekisha" (Japanese: 指令No.1 追跡者)	16 July 1989
Sonnet is introduced by showing her handily destroying athree tanks and a helicopter sent to destroy her in a ghost town in Arizona. She is a cyborg created for Talon (an evil organization bent on world domination) by Dr. Merikus to be the most powerful weapon in the world. Talon sends her to Tokyo to investigate something and is given carte blanche to accomplish her mission. Sonnet goes undercover as a regular high school student and makes friends with Lan Komatsuzaki and Naru Haibara almost immediately. Lan notices something unusual about Sonnet, but cannot figure out what it is. She immediately becomes very popular due to her looks as well as her talents such as playing the piano, her math skills, and her physical prowess. Lan goes home and tells her guardian Jin about the amazing new student at school. She also tells him that there is something unusual about her, and that she has a bad feeling about it. When Jin points out she might just be jealous, Lan manifests some of her powers which causes her to become worried. Jin tells her powers are a gift and that she is not a monster because of them. After she goes to sleep, she has a nightmare—the same nightmare she has had several times before. As she is going to school the next day, Sonnet causes a large building sign to fall toward Lan and her friend, but Lan uses her powers to deflect the sign. That weekend, while attending an F-1 race, Sonnet causes an accident with the race cars and one of them flies through the air directly toward Lan and her friends. Her latent powers strongly manifest themselves and she deflects the car away from the crowd, but Wataru is badly cut by flying debris. Lan offers her blood to help him with a transfusion. At the hospital, Lan thanks Shūichi Torigai for helping her brother, and he warns her to be careful of Sonnet. She then tells Jin that she is concerned about all the things that have been happening since Sonnet arrived, and that she fears things will only get worse.
2	"Directive 2: The Tactician"; Transliteration: "Shirei Nanbā Tsū: Sakubōsha" (Japanese: 指令No.2 策謀者)	25 September 1989
The peace of a beautiful countryside is disturbed by wargames as a new tank model is tested. Those watching the test discuss the imminent arrival in Japan of Dr. Merikus. After picking up Dr. Merikus and Sonnet at the airport, they are accosted by bōsōzoku on the way back to the hotel. As they try to kidnap Sonnet, she makes short work of them. Shūichi sends a get well bouquet to Wataru in the hospital, and Wataru teases Lan about him. Jin is investigating the Azumi Group, and learns they might be working in genetic engineering as well, and they recently opened a new facility. Dr. Merikus meets with the Azumi Group board where they tell him that Talon wants the Crimson Fang dealt with quickly. They offer him all of their resources, but he declines in favor of continuing to allow Sonnet to handle the issue. At that moment, Sonnet is being mugged by two delinquents at the high school, but a large group of students intervenes before they can touch her. Sonnet is confused by this show of friendship. Jin tells Lan that he is going to be gone for a few days doing research. He does not realize that the Azumi Group is aware of him and is planning to use him for their own purposes. At school, Sonnet continues to be surprised and confused by how friendly everyone is toward her, causing her to collapse during lunch. Merikus, posing as her family doctor, arrives at the school to examine her in order to determine what caused the collapse. The school nurse comes in during the examination and sees that Sonnet is a cyborg, so Sonnet has to seize control of her mind of the incident. As Merikus and Sonnet are flying away in a helicopter, he orders Sonnet to kill the nurse, and she does so reluctantly after arguing with him about it. Wataru tells Lan that he thinks he may have some esper powers since he received the transfusion from her. Sonnet, meanwhile, is continuing to argue with Merikus that there was no need to kill the nurse. She tells him that this is the first time she has had real friends. Lan receives a call that Jin has been in an accident and goes with the police to deal with it. Shūichi arrives just as the police are driving away with Lan, so he goes upstairs and discovers that they may not be the police after all. He takes Wataru with him and follows the alleged police car. The fake police take Lan out to an old ship in the harbor and lock her in a room. Merikus welcomes her via video feed and sends a bomb into the room in order to get her to show her latent Crimson Fang powers. Just as the bomb explodes, Lan teleports to a road on the shore and nearly gets run over by Jin. Shūichi and Wataru arrive as Jin contemplates Lan's growing powers.
3	"Directive 3: The Challenger"; Transliteration: "Shirei Nanbā Surī: Chōsensha" (Japanese: 指令No.3 挑戦者)	25 November 1989
4	"Directive 4: The Fighter"; Transliteration: "Shirei Nanbā Fō: Sentōsha" (Japanese: 指令No.4 戦斗者)	25 March 1990
5	"Directive 5: The Mourner"; Transliteration: "Shirei Nanbā Faibu: Rishūsha" (Japanese: 指令No.5 離愁者)	25 June 1990

== OVA staff ==
- Director: Takeyuki Kanda
- Creator: Masahiro Shibata
- Screenplays: Seiji Matsuoka, Kōichi Mizuide
- Producer: Yukihiro Shino
- Character Designs: Katsuichi Nakayama
- Mechanical Designs: Masahito Yamashita
- Storyboards: Yūichirō Yokoyama
- Production: Mushi Productions
- Production Cooperation: Tatsunoko Production

== Reception ==
The OVA series has been described as "a visual delight" which "harkens back to a simpler age, when the important thing was that the characters looked cute and the action looked cool", even though the "plot fits together, but only barely". While based on shōjo manga, the series contains intense and graphic violence, which is not typical for most shōjo works. The anime is considered "a little bit better than average, though it "doesn't feel finished", but it is "better than the vast majority of 'magical warrior'" series.
