= Ronin Warriors =

Japanese anime television series

- 鎧伝サムライトルーパー
- Also known as: Yoroiden-Samurai Troopers
- Created by: Hajime Yatate
- Directed by: Masashi Ikeda (#1–19); Mamoru Hamatsu (#20–39)
- Series composition: Ryōsuke Takahashi
- Character designer: Norio Shioyama
- Music by: Osamu Totsuka
- Opening themes: "Stardust Eyes"; by Mariko Uranishi; "Samurai Heart"; by Hiroko Moriguchi
- Ending themes: "Faraway"; by Mariko Uranishi; "Be Free"; by Hiroko Moriguchi
- No. of episodes: 39 (list of episodes)

Production
- Editor: Tomoaki Tsurubuchi
- Producers: Makoto Imai (Nagoya TV); Youichi Honna (Tokyu Agency); Hironori Nakagawa (Sunrise)
- Production companies: Nagoya TV; Tokyu Agency; Sunrise

Original release
- Networks: ANN (Nagoya TV, TV Asahi)
- Release: April 30, 1988 – March 4, 1989

Related
Further information
Manga
| Written by | Ryūichi Hoshino |
| Published by | Kodansha |
| Magazine | Comic BomBom |
| Original run | May 1988 – April 5, 1990 |
| Volumes | 2 |
Original video animation
Ronin Warriors OVA (Note: Divided into three arcs: Gaiden (#1–2); Legend of the Inferno Armor (#3–6); Message (#7–11))
| Directed by | Kazuki Akane (#1–2); Mamoru Hamatsu (#3–6); Osamu Sekita (#7–11) |
| Produced by | Yasuhisa Kazama; Hironori Nakagawa (#1–6); Shinichiro Kobayashi (#7–11) |
| Written by | Fuyunori Gobu (#1–6); Masashi Ikeda (#3–11) |
| Music by | Osamu Totsuka |
| Studio | Sunrise |
| Licensed by | NA: Discotek Media |
| Released | April 30, 1989 – August 23, 1991 |
| Runtime | 25–30 minutes |
| Episodes | 11 |
Manga
Shin Yoroiden Samurai Troopers
| Written by | Izumi Nikaidō |
| Illustrated by | Yūji Hosoi |
| Published by | Kodansha |
| Magazine | Monthly Shōnen Magazine |
| Published | 1992 |
| Volumes | 1 |
- Sequel
- Yoroi-Shinden Samurai Troopers

Ronin Warriors, known in Japan as Yoroiden-Samurai Troopers (Japanese: 鎧伝サムライトルーパー, Hepburn: Yoroiden Samurai Torūpā; 'Legendary Armored Samurai Troopers'), is a Japanese anime series created by Hajime Yatate and produced by Sunrise. The television series, co-produced by Nagoya TV, aired across Japan on the All-Nippon News Network from April 30, 1988, to March 4, 1989, for a total of 39 episodes. A manga adaptation was serialized on Kodansha's Comic BomBom from November 17, 1988, to April 5, 1990, and the chapters collected into 2 tankōbon volumes. A sequel to the original series premiered on January 6, 2026.

== Plot ==
Talpa, ruler of the Dynasty, is bent on conquering the Earth. Standing against Talpa and his four Dark Warlords are the five Ronin Warriors, each in possession of mystical armor and weapons. They are assisted by Mia Koji, a young student-researcher; Ully, a child; and a mysterious warrior-mystic known only as the Ancient One.

== Media ==
=== Anime ===
Ronin Warriors was originally licensed in the United States by Graz Entertainment and distributed by Cinar (now WildBrain), and it was recorded by the Vancouver-based Ocean Productions cast. Ronin Warriors first aired on American television during the summer of 1995 and subsequently appeared through syndication, as well as the USA Network (1995), Sci-Fi Channel (1996) and later on Cartoon Network (1999).

The series was released on DVD in 2002, including the original Japanese version with English subtitles on the reverse side of the disc. On September 4, 2014, North American anime licensor Discotek Media announced their license of the original Japanese anime (Yoroiden Samurai Troopers), and planned to release the series on DVD in 2015. Discotek has said that on their Facebook page that they have no plans to release Ronin Warriors until they clear issues with the dub. Discotek has also licensed the OVAs and includes both Japanese and English audio as well as English subtitles. By 2021, the issues were resolved and the series' English dub had a Blu-ray release on December 28, 2021.

Crunchyroll later added the anime series for its streaming. The English dub was legally available on streaming services such Amazon Prime Video, RetroCrush, and Tubi.

The opening and ending sequences and the eyecatches were replaced with new ones, and the Japanese title cards were removed; there were no substantial cuts to the bodies of the episodes and the episodes retained most of the original music.

A line of action figures based on the anime was released by Playmates Toys in 1995, with a limited rerelease by Re:Play in 2001.

Three OVA sequels were produced: Gaiden (Side Story), The Legend of the Inferno Armor, and Message. There are numerous novels and audio dramas based on the anime. While all the sequels have been released on DVD, the manga and audio dramas have not been made available in English.

=== Sequel ===
A sequel of the original series, titled Yoroi-Shinden Samurai Troopers (鎧真伝サムライトルーパー, Yoroi Shinden Samurai Torūpā; "True Legendary Armored Samurai Troopers"), premiered in January 2026.

=== Music ===
- Yoroiden Samurai Troopers Debut Album: Kimi o Nemurasenai (King Records, December 21, 1988, 4 weeks on Oricon chart). (4 weeks on Oricon chart, ranked as high as 44).
- Yoroiden Samurai Troopers: Best Friends (King Records, June 5, 1989). (4 weeks on Oricon chart, ranked as high as 12).
- "Stardust Eyes", the opening theme for season one's episodes 1-20, was composed by Yasuhiko Shigemura. Its ending theme, "Faraway", was composed by Midori Karashima. Both were sung by Mariko Uranishi.
- "Samurai Heart", the opening theme from season two's episodes 21–39, and "Be Free", its ending theme, were composed by Yasuhiko Shigemura. Both were sung by Hiroko Moriguchi.
- The first OAV Gaiden features "Stardust Eyes" and "Faraway" as its first episode's opening and closing themes, and "Samurai Heart" and "Be Free" as its second's.
- The second OAV Legend of the Inferno Armor features "Stardust Eyes" as its opening theme and "Samurai Heart" as its closing theme for its four episodes.
- The third OAV Message has no opening theme but its ending theme, "Tsukamaeteite", was composed by Ami Keizou. Episode 5 also features an insert song, "Hoshi no Lullaby", composed by Ritsuko Okazaki. Both were sung by Kaori Honma (née Futenma).

=== Video game ===
In July 2020, a crossover with Ragnarok Mobile was launched.
