= Takeyuki Kanda =

Japanese anime director (1943–1996)

Takeyuki Kanda (神田 武幸, Kanda Takeyuki; August 8, 1943 – July 27, 1996) was an anime director for Sunrise who was known for directing Vifam, The Ultraman anime, Kiko Senki Dragonar and the first six episodes of Mobile Suit Gundam: The 08th MS Team. He was a close friend and coworker of Ryosuke Takahashi.

On July 27, 1996, Kanda suddenly died. Umanosuke Iida took over for the remaining episodes of The 08th MS Team. The final episode of The 08th MS Team, the movie Miller's Report and the first episode of Ginga Hyōryū Vifam 13 were all dedicated in his loving memory.

== Works as a director ==
- The Adventures of the Little Prince (1978) (co-directed with Kôji Yamazaki)
- The Ultraman (1979) (co-directed with Hisayuki Toriumi)
- Uchū Taitei God Sigma (1980) (directed episodes 1–10)
- Fang of the Sun Dougram (1981) (co-directed with Ryousuke Takahashi)
- Doraemon: What Am I for Momotaro (1981)
- Shiroi Kiba White Fang Monogatari (1982) (co-directed with Soji Yoshikawa)
- Ginga Hyōryū Vifam (1983)
- Ginga Hyōryū Vifam: Kachua Kara no Tayori (1984)
- Ginga Hyōryū Vifam: Atsumatta 13-nin (1984)
- Choriki Robo Galatt (1984)
- Ginga Hyōryū Vifam: Kieta 12-nin (1985)
- Ginga Hyōryū Vifam: "Kate no Kioku" Namida no Dakkai Sakusen!! (1985)
- Metal Armor Dragonar (1987)
- Armor Hunter Mellowlink (1988)
- Blue Sonnet (1989)
- Dragon Warrior (Dragon Quest: Legend of the Hero Abel) (1989) (co-directed with Katsuhisa Yamada and Rintaro)
- SD Gundam The Movie: Musha Knight Command (1991)
- Tanoshii Moomin Ikka: Bōken Nikki (1991)
- Konpeki no Kantai (1993) (replaced by Hiromichi Matano in late 1995 when going to do The 08th MS Team)
- Mobile Suit Gundam: The 08th MS Team (1996) (directed the first six episodes and was replaced by Umanosuke Iida after his death)
