= Kuroda =

Kuroda (written: 黒田 lit. "black ricefield") is a Japanese surname. Notable people with the surname include:

- Aki Kuroda (黒田 アキ; born 1944), Japanese painter
- Akinobu Kuroda (黒田 明伸), Japanese historian
- Chris Kuroda, lighting designer and operator for the band Phish and Justin Bieber, among others
- Emily Kuroda (born 1952), American actress
- Fukumi Kuroda (黒田 福美; born 1956), Japanese actress
- Haruhiko Kuroda (黒田 東彦; born 1944), governor of Bank of Japan and former president of Asian Development Bank
- Haruka Kuroda (黒田 はるか; born 1977), Japanese-born English actress
- Hiroki Kuroda (黒田 博樹; born 1975), Japanese baseball player
- Iou Kuroda (黒田 硫黄; born 1971), pen name of a Japanese manga artist
- Joshua Kuroda-Grauer (born 2003), American baseball player
- Jutaro Kuroda (黒田 重太郎; 1887–1970), Japanese painter
- Kan'ichi Kuroda (黒田 寛一; 1927–2006), Japanese far-left philosopher and social theorist
- Kuroda Kanbei (黒田 官兵衛; 1546–1604), famed strategist under Toyotomi Hideyoshi
- Kuroda Nagamasa (黒田 長政; 1568–1623), Samurai, son of Kuroda Kanbei
- Kuroda Kiyotaka (黒田 清隆; 1840–1900), Japanese politician and second Prime Minister of Japan
- Momoko Kuroda (黒田杏子; born 1938), Japanese haiku poet
- Nagamichi Kuroda (黒田 長礼; 1889–1978), Japanese ornithologist
- Natsuko Kuroda (黒田 夏子; born 1937), Japanese writer
- Paul K. Kuroda (1917–2001), Japanese-American nuclear scientist
- Paul M. Kuroda (born 1954), Japanese-American chess player
- Robert T. Kuroda (1922–1944), American soldier Medal of Honor recipient
- Sayako Kuroda (黒田 清子; born 1969), child of Emperor Akihito and Empress Michiko of Japan
- Seiki Kuroda (黒田 清輝; 1866-1924), Japanese painter
- Sige-Yuki Kuroda (黒田 成幸; 1934–2009), linguist, inventor of the Kuroda normal form
- Shigenori Kuroda (黒田 重徳; 1887–1952), Japanese general
- Takaya Kuroda (黒田 崇矢; born 1965), Japanese voice actor
- Takuya Kuroda (黒田 卓也; born 1980), Japanese jazz trumpeter
- Tatsuaki Kuroda (黒田 辰秋; 1904–1982), Japanese woodworker and lacquerware artist
- Tetsuhiro Kuroda (黒田 哲広; born 1971), Japanese professional wrestler
- Tokubei Kuroda (黒田 徳米; 1886–1987), Japanese malacologist
- Yōsuke Kuroda (黒田 洋介; born 1968), Japanese anime screenwriter
- Maiko Kuroda (黒田 麻衣子; born 1976), Japanese entrepreneur

== Fictional characters ==
- Hikari Kuroda (黒田 光), a character in the visual novel School Days
