= Nasu =

Nasu may refer to:

- Nasu people, an ethnic group in China
- New American Standard Bible Update
- Nasu (那須), a traditional name for a region in northern Tochigi Prefecture, Japan. It is also in the names of several places:
  - Nasushiobara, Tochigi, a city
  - Nasukarasuyama, Tochigi, a city
  - Nasu, Tochigi, a town
  - Nasu District, Tochigi
  - Nasu Highlands, an open area
  - Nasu Mountains, volcanic peaks in the region
  - Nasushiobara Station, a railway station takes its name from the region
- Nasu (茄子 or ナス), the Japanese word for eggplant
  - Nasu (manga), a 2000 manga series by Iou Kuroda
  - Nasu: Summer in Andalusia, a 2003 animated film adapted from Nasu
  - Nasu: A Migratory Bird with Suitcase, a 2007 original video animation sequel
- Kinoko Nasu (born 1973), Japanese author, co-founder of TYPE-MOON
- Sisu Nasu, military all-terrain transport vehicle of Finnish origin
- Nasu (Zoroastrianism), a term meaning unclean and negative in Zoroastrianism
- Nasu language, a Loloish language spoken by Yi people of China
- National Academy of Sciences of Ukraine
- Nasu no Yoichi a samurai who fought alongside the Minamoto clan in the Genpei War.
