= List of Shangri-La episodes =

Cover art for the volume 1 compilation DVD of Shangri-La, featuring lead character Kuniko Hojo

Shangri-La is an anime series adapted from the light novel of the same title by Eiichi Ikegami and Ken'ichi Yoshida. The series was produced by Gonzo, directed by Makoto Bessho, written by Hiroshi Ōnogi, and featured character designs by Range Murata. The story is set in the mid-21st century when a carbon emission trading market has been imposed in order to mitigate the effects of global warming. After an earthquake devastates much of Japan, Tokyo is turned into the world's largest "jungle-polis" in order to absorb carbon dioxide emissions.

It was the first serialized work published in Newtype magazine to be animated for television. The series premiered on April 6, 2009, on Chiba TV. The first compilation DVD was released by Kadokawa Entertainment on July 24, 2009. The Internet streaming media service Crunchyroll also aired the series on simulcast with episodes airing one hour after they were released in Japan. On April 6, 2012, Funimation Entertainment acquires the rights to the series.

The anime has three pieces of theme music; one opening theme and two ending themes. The opening theme is "Kimi Shinitamō Koto Nakare" (キミシニタモウコトナカレ) by May'n. The first ending theme is "Hajimari no Asa ni Hikari Are." (はじまりの朝に光あれ.) by Midori, and the second ending theme is "Tsuki ni Kakuseshi Chō no Yume" (月に隠せし蝶の夢) by Midori.

== Episode list ==
No.	Title	Original release date	Asia premiere
1	"The Girl's Return"; Transliteration: "Shōjo Kikan" (Japanese: 少女帰還)	April 6, 2009	September 19, 2011
Kuniko Hojo is released from the girls' detention center. She is picked up by her friends Momoko, Mīko, and Takehiko, and returns to her home in Duomo. Kuniko is being groomed to be the future leader of Metal Age, a resistance organisation, which opposes the government's drastic policies on environmentalism. A high authority figure, Lady Ryoko, is informed of Kuniko's movements. Mikuni, a girl born from aristocracy, uses the highways of Atlas as her playground. Karin Ishida, a young computer genius, legally blackmails a politician from a third-world country into signing a banking contract with her company in Atlas, for over-exceeding carbon emissions. Takehiko recklessly burns fuel to celebrate Kuniko's return, in defiance on the government. The Atlas Security Corps and the military suddenly attack Duomo. Kuniko and the Metal Age members defend their town. They realize that Atlas is holding them responsible for an unknown terrorist incident. When Kuniko launches her boomerang at Major Kunihito Kusanagi, he blocks it with his dagger, which causes it, Mikuni's, and Kuniko's sacred daggers to resonate. A moment later, mysterious black dots appear above Duomo and began raining down on everyone, causing mass destruction.
2	"The Poison Sea of Ikebukuro"; Transliteration: "Ikebukuro Jukai" (Japanese: 池袋呪海)	April 13, 2009	September 20, 2011
The black dots raining down on Duomo lead to everyone fleeing, including Atlas security and military. After the attacks stop, Kuniko and the other Metal Age members perform a search-and-rescue operation of Duomo's residents. Lady Ryoko is furious about the attack, believing it to be a foreign army's doing. One of Ryoko's men, Leon, volunteers to lead a team to investigate the source. Meanwhile, Kuniko, Momoko and Takehiko decide to investigate as well, at the place the attacks supposedly originated from: Ikebukuro, now a toxic swamp. Their team wears protective gear to protect from the dense oxygen and poisonous swamp gas. Karin works with several of her peers to control investments and economy of other countries. However, she goes into a bad mood when one of her peers posts a presumably sarcastic remark. Mikuni punishes one of her retainers for lying by killing her with her psychic powers. Kuniko's team encounter a military squad sent into the Ikebukuro jungle to investigate. They are discovered by Kunihito and flee. Kuniko ambushes Kunihito and interrogates him on the military's presence, and the resonance of their sacred blades. Kunihito claims not to know anything, and Kuniko escapes. Ryoko's men find that the artillery attack emitted no carbon dioxide, leading them to wonder if it is nature's punishment on them. Atlas begins the regular lottery to allow Duomo residents to live in the city and Mīko is one of the chosen. Ryoko gets an audience with the lord of Atlas, telling him that the seals have resonated.
3	"The Creation"; Transliteration: "Tenchi Sōzō" (Japanese: 天地層造)	April 20, 2009	September 21, 2011
Kuniko has a strange dream of Atlas, and learns from her grandmother, Nagiko, that her biological mother lived in Atlas. Takehiko and other Metal Age members raid a train from Atlas for supplies. Kuniko, Momoko and friends celebrate Mīko's departure to Atlas. Momoko entrusts Mīko with reopening the Tropical Fish, a bar staging Burlesque shows. Residents of Duomo get into an argument over Metal Age's responsibility for the attacks and their overall role. Kuniko wonders if everyone would be happy if they are able to live in Atlas, and decides to infiltrate the city. Karin is informed by her peer that she apparently messed with Saudi Arabia's carbon coefficient, thus making the latter rake in less money. She is confused by the apparent spike in the carbon economy. Ryoko's men find no new movements from the owners of the Sun and Moon blades. Kuniko, Momoko and Takehiko sneak into Atlas by faking identities as construction workers heading into the city. Mīko is forcibly recruited to be Mikuni's replacement retainer. Kuniko gets discovered while heading through a checkpoint in Atlas' support column, and the group flees. They are chased by security, but fortunately an earthquake occurs and the group uses the distraction to escape. Seeing the numerous empty lots inside of Atlas, Kuniko wonders why they are not allowed to live in Atlas, even though there were enough space to do so.
4	"Uber-Akihabara"; Transliteration: "Chō Akihabara" (Japanese: 超秋葉原)	April 27, 2009	September 22, 2011
Kuniko muses on the vision of Atlas, and decides to finance a rebellion against Atlas by selling the community's graphite (which is rich in carbon). Escorted by Momoko (over Takehiko's objections), she travels to the black market in Neo-Akihabara, a place still populated by electronics shops and otaku. In Atlas, we learn that Mīko has become a trusted retainer for Mikuni. Meanwhile, Karin and her companions become aware that someone else is manipulating the carbon market. Karin concludes that to do so, this other party must have duplicated their computer system, and she focuses her own search on Akihabara. While searching there, she sees Kuniko through a security camera.
5	"Wild Dance of Madness"; Transliteration: "Ranshin Ranbu" (Japanese: 乱心嵐舞)	May 4, 2009	September 23, 2011
Kuniko and Momoko bump into Kunihito, who masquerades himself as an otaku. He threatens them to stay away from the area, but both of them decide to follow him anyway. Using a virtual simulator supplied by the old otaku shopowners, Kuniko hacks the security camera in the shop to see what Kunihito is up to. They see Kunihito and Leon question a shopowner on who may have recently purchased a specific nanochip. After using a piece of mimic armor to bribe the owner, he reveals that an American finance company called Serpent purchased one. Kuniko discovers Karin's presence. Mīko tells stories of the livelihood of Duomo residents to Mikuni, leading the latter to long for the chance to go outside.Later, Momoko forces Kuniko and Kunihito on a "date". The pair question and criticize each of their faction's motives. A bomb shower occurs and the two seek shelter. Kuniko and Kunihito formally introduce themselves and learn more about each other's lifestyles; however, their conversation goes sour, and Kuniko attacks Kunihito in anger and escapes, losing her boomerang in the process. Kuniko brings back the mimic armor sample to show her grandmother and Takehiko. Karin speaks to a governmental minister, asking him if he wants to take down Serpent.
6	"Fictitious Battle Lines"; Transliteration: "Kyokō Sensen" (Japanese: 虚構戦線)	May 11, 2009	September 26, 2011
Karin convinces the Japanese government to use Kuwait as bait to lure out Serpent, despite the fact it will destroy that country's economy. Kuniko and Nagiko both watch the manipulation of carbon coefficient. Kunihito intends to resign for the loss of the mimic armor sample, but his superior tells him that Atlas has already pardoned him for this mistake. He is ordered to head for the Moon Palace to meet Mikuni. While Mikuni questions Kunihito on his recent events, Sayoko finds his Atlas rank is classified. She also discovers that his family blade matches the same material and shape as Mikuni's sacred blade. The lord of Atlas, Hiruko, goes hysterical from the thought of having the two blades meet. The government begins its hunt for Serpent. After Serpent takes the bait, Kuniko, with Nagiko's help, locates it originating from one of the islands in the Maldives. Ryoko obtains this information and sends it to America. Kuniko learns that America has dropped thermobaric bombs on the location, erasing Serpent's threat and stabilising the carbon market. Karin discovers it was her peer, Talsian, who created a copy of Medusa for the Maldives, using this incident to teach the original Medusa caution.
7	"Sad Thoughts of Love and Hate"; Transliteration: "Hisō Onshū" (Japanese: 悲想恩讐)	May 18, 2009	September 27, 2011
Ryoko's men launch a sneak attack on Duomo, demanding Kuniko to come with them. Tomoka gets herself involved and is taken along with Kuniko. Both girls are taken to the detention center from which Kuniko was previously released. Ryoko has taken the position of prison commandant to watch over Kuniko. Kunihito wants to question Kuniko but is told by his superior that she is held under custody by Atlas authority. Kuniko is constantly bullied by Rena and her gang, who appeared in the center after Kuniko was released. After defending a friend from being threatened, Kuniko learns that Rena bullies her in order to obtain an Atlas rank offered by Ryoko. Kuniko gets into a fight with Rena and defeats her, but she takes the blame for her when Ryoko punishes Rena for failing in her mission. Kuniko spends the next three days standing without food and shelter under the sky. Tomoka reveals to Rena that she was the one who committing a crime two years ago, but that Kuniko took the blame in order to protect her, and ended up in the detention center. On the third day, Ryoko is impressed by Kuniko's endurance and announces that as a reward, she will have Kuniko executed. At this, Kuniko finally breaks down and loses consciousness.
8	"Lipstick Cruelty"; Transliteration: "Kuchibeni Muzan" (Japanese: 口紅無残)	May 25, 2009	September 28, 2011
Atlas authority announces the imminent execution of Kuniko and everyone approach this news with mixed results. Momoko visits Kuniko in jail and hands her food prepared by Nagiko and a dress to wear before her execution. Tomoka reluctantly seduces the guard to allow her to talk to Kuniko but is caught by Leon. However, he lets Tomoka speak with Kuniko briefly before ending the conversation, telling her that he will pretend that the two girls' conversation never happened. Rena, Nao and the other prisoners plan something by bribing various guards or improvising various materials. Ryoko plans to do something about Kuniko and Mikuni's destinies with the former's execution. Wearing lipstick and her original clothes, Kuniko prepares for the execution. Suddenly, Kuniko cuts off the guards' weapons with nanowires from the lipstick and escapes with Tomoka on a hydrogen balloon the prisoners created, promising to come back for them one day. Ryoko is impressed by the efforts of Kuniko and the prisoners, and decides to return to Atlas, but not before ordering the guards to execute all of the remaining prisoners. As Kuniko and Tomoka head home with a waiting Momoko, a solar eclipse occurs, and Mikuni and her retainers play on the highway.
9	"Divine Prophecy of the Sun and Moon"; Transliteration: "Tenkei Yōgetsu" (Japanese: 天啓陽月)	June 1, 2009	September 29, 2011
As the trio of Kuniko, Momoko and Tomoka watch the eclipse and destruction around them, Sayoko attacks them with her sniper rifle. While Momoko fights off Sayoko and her guards, Kuniko unknowingly attacks Mīko, but she manages to deflect her boomerang and recognizes who the owner is. Momoko falls prey to Sayoko's trickery and is taken away by the guards with an escaping Mikuni and Mīko, while Tomoka is slightly injured by a gunshot. Karin gets a call from Klaris who has gone bankrupt from the eclipse. She promises to give Klaris funds if only she helps her with a favor. A captive Momoko remains defiant against Sayoko, who recognizes a similar earring on him that Mikuni has as well. Ryoko reports to Hiruko about Kuniko and Mikuni, and a shocking secret of Hiruko's immortality is revealed. Kuniko returns home with Tomoka, but is upset about Momoko's capture. She struggles to rescue everyone with Takehiko and the others. Karin learns from Klaris that Talsian has ordered Medusa to infiltrate the Jupiter observation satellite. Medusa utilizes an orbital satellite to create typhoons on the ocean. Kuniko, Takehiko and other members of metal age manage to tunnel into the courtyard of the now-abandoned detention center, only to find that Rena, Nao, and all of the other prisoners have been shot to death; their lifeless bodies, covered with blood, are strewn about the courtyard. Kuniko frantically begins checking the bodies, hoping that some might still be alive, but it quickly becomes clear there are no survivors. Kuniko realizes that the girls were killed because they helped her escape, then breaks down and cries for failing to keep her promise to rescue them.
10	"Blade of the Sacred Sound"; Transliteration: "Kotodama no Tsurugi" (Japanese: 言霊之剣)	June 8, 2009	September 30, 2011
A heated discussion erupts among Metal Age members on whether Kuniko will take over Nagiko's place as leader. A flashback shows Kuniko's childhood and her first meeting with Momoko and Mīko. After beating Momoko up, Sayoko demands to know how he got the earring. When Momoko refuses to talk, Sayoko resorts to using truth serum to make him tell the truth, but he has a tolerance to the medicine and reveals nothing. By watching Sayoko, Momoko deduces that she was once a mother, this causes Sayoko to strangle him. Mikuni tricks Mīko to a game of hide-and-seek but quietly sneaks outside the palace. She passes out from pain when sunlight envelops outside. At this time, Hiruko prophesies over the sun, moon and land, stating the time has come to listen to Amatsumihashira, the pillar of heaven. Klaris returns control of Medusa over to Karin. Mikuni reveals to Sayoko that she heard a voice, which shocks Sayoko. Ryoko makes a press conference announcing her new position as prime minister, which angers Kuniko and Metal Age. After being told to stand by, Sayoko resorts to take Mikuni to where the sun shines. After coming to grips with Momoko's kidnapping and the deaths of her friends at the girls' correctional center, Kuniko makes her decision to become leader of Metal Age and accepts the sun blade from Nagiko (which causes a resonance with the other blades) and announces her intention to lead a full-scale attack against Atlas - not out of a desire for revenge - but because she believes it is the right thing to do to help the people of Duomo. Meanwhile, Ryoko sends a stealth carrier with Kunihito on board to attack the facility where Medusa is kept.
11	"Butterfly Dream"; Transliteration: "Kochō Mugen" (Japanese: 胡蝶夢幻)	June 15, 2009	October 3, 2011
Karin finds herself singing a lullaby that she didn't remember before. Kunihito remembers the song while dreaming of obtaining the land blade when he was a child. He wakes up to find his remaining crew from the carrier adrift in the ocean. The carbon market is stabilized for the moment, and Karin receives a cat for a visitor. Kunihito remembers that the carrier was enveloped by a light emitted from a satellite. Ryoko receives a report that their forces aren't able to close on Medusa's location due to typhoons. Karin receives a message from her parents that they will be back soon. As Karin laments that she's unable to leave, a long-haired youth trespasses her place and invites her outside, though she vehemently refuses. She discovers that the youth wasn't captured by security on camera. Karin knows it wasn't a dream and wishes to see the youth again. True to her words, the youth reappears - this time inside her room. He convinces Karin that she can interact with other people despite her protests. He invites her outside to a meeting, claiming she will find what she lost. Leon requests permission from Ryoko to view files pertaining to the Digmas. After days of waiting for help, Kunihito sees a plane headed in their direction. Karin finally leaves her home, which resembles a bird cage. She thanks the youth for helping her remember that her mother sang her the lullaby, and the youth disappears. Leon finds information pertaining to the youth, Digma Zero aka Canary, who supposedly died five years ago without having seen the outside world. As Karin finishes her song, the cat disappears as well. Kunihito as a child releases canaries from a bird cage.
12	"All in Constant Flux"; Transliteration: "Seisei Ruten" (Japanese: 生勢流転)	June 22, 2009	October 4, 2011
Kunihito recovers in hospital. Ryoko orders the survivors of the anti-Medusa operation besides Kunihito disposed of. She makes a press conference announcing the indefinite postponement of the Atlas Settlement Project. Metal Age is outraged and Kuniko decides to use aerial attacks on Atlas. Karin reaps a lot of money in her latest scheme and decides to go shopping outside. However, she wears a bear costume to cope with her fear of communicating with people. Sayoko barges into Ryoko's residence. Kuniko and Takehiko go shopping at Neo-Akihabara for tons of demolition materials and ammo. Ryoko informs Sayoko that the reason Mikuni has not been made successor is because there are two others, but she does not tell her their identities. Kuniko runs into Karin and talks to her, but the girl freaks out and flees. Sayoko tries to hack into Zeus, Atlas' computer system, but is thwarted by Ryoko. Mīko sees Sayoko being led away by Ryoko's men and he picks up Momoko's earring. Momoko wakes up to find herself released and finds her earring and a note from Mīko. As Kuniko and Metal Age plan to attack Atlas with all the forces they have, Momoko returns, to a very much relieved Kuniko.
13	"Flying Girl"; Transliteration: "Hikō Shōjo" (Japanese: 飛行少女)	June 29, 2009	October 5, 2011
Kuniko announces the beginning of Metal Age's fight for survival against Atlas government, for the sake of everyone. Talsian makes his first appearance as chairman of Atlas. Kuniko, Takehiko and Momoko go to what remains of Yokota Air Base to meet K.D., who will be providing Metal Age with a gigantic stealth bomber. Meanwhile, construction workers involved in the building of Atlas strongly oppose the inhumane treatment the people outside Atlas receive. The protest turns into a widespread riot against Atlas security. Under Kuniko's command, the stealth bomber carrying Metal Age forces approach Atlas, but are soon attacked by Atlas air force. Karin takes this chance to make money from the war. The air force fires missiles at the bomber but end up hitting Atlas' supports instead. Kuniko goes outside the plane to destroy the remaining missiles with her boomerang. Mīko teaches Mikuni a lesson in fighting for a cause. Under control of Zeus, Atlas sends multiple defense drones that attack both the air force and the bomber. As Kuniko and Momoko try to destroy the drones, the drones are in turn destroyed by the strange artillery strike that hit Duomo earlier. K.D. makes a suicidal attack on a drone after deploying Metal Age forces, who fly off in jet packs. Kuniko destroys the last drone and is rescued by Momoko. As Kuniko watches K.D. parachute himself to safety, she notices a hole in one of Atlas' supports created by an explosion that has disappeared.
14	"Transfigured City"; Transliteration: "Henbō Toshi" (Japanese: 変貌都市)	July 6, 2009	October 6, 2011
Many parts of Duomo are being attacked by the unknown firepower coming from Ikebukuro. Night falls and Kuniko and Momoko try to find their way in. Although the Metal Age forces are scattered around, they manage to break through the interior wall of the city. However they are shortly thrust into different environments and attacked by mimic armored security drones. Kuniko realizes that all the environments seen by the Metal Age forces are holographs. She orders the rest of the Metal Age forces to rendezvous at City Hall. As Kuniko and Momoko make their way through a holograph depicting the old landmarks of Tokyo, they discuss the history of the Atlas Project. Atlas was created using funds donated by Sergei Talsian, after Japan experiences the Second Great Kanto earthquake that destroyed Tokyo. Karin continues to play the market even though Zhang warns her about Medusa's self-individuality. Talsian and Ryoko are waiting for Atlas' completion for the Sun, Moon and Land digmas to fulfil their destinies. Meanwhile, an imprisoned Sayoko wakes up to find her cell door ripped open and she escapes. Numerous squads of Metal Age are killed by the illusions of the holograph. Kuniko causes mayhem throughout the landscape, eventually crossing paths with Kunihito once again, who has just arrived at the scene. However before they can argue further, they are separated once again. Kuniko moves through a path and eventually reaches the Diet. Metal Age forces are poisoned by gases emitted from the artillery strike that hit Atlas. Kuniko enters the building to hear a woman's voice talking about the creation of Atlas. Through photos shown in the building, Kuniko discovers that her grandmother, Nagiko, was the first CEO of Atlas Corporation.
15	"Freak Defeat"; Transliteration: "Meisō Haitai" (Japanese: 迷走敗退)	July 13, 2009	October 7, 2011
Zhang continues to warn Karin of her country's status but Medusa limits his access privileges. Ryoko talks to Kuniko about the gas, but find neither of them involved with the gas attack. Ryoko threatens to blow the entire floor where Kuniko's forces are if they don't surrender, but Talsian offers protection for them if they agree to ceasefire. Kuniko shocks the rest by agreeing to the truce, as she doesn't want Metal Age to defy the orders of the United Nations and result in the isolation of Japan. As Metal Age give up their fight, Takehiko sees a ghostly white girl entering an old shrine inside the Atlas complex. He walks through a surreal landscape and finds his missing sister, Yasuko's shoes and cries. Karin discovers Zhang messing with her head leases and she vows to play his game and win. Kuniko secretly visits Atlas' residential area with Momoko but is chased by security. However, they end up trespassing Kunihito's mother's house and ask for help. Kunihito tries to look for his surviving mates on board the carrier and was told their records are not found. Karin is informed by Medusa that her company is now bankrupt. Nagiko is found to be assisting Zhang, who knows nothing of her identity, of the takeover in the leases. Karin sets Medusa to steal Atlas' treasury under Zeus' control. Talsian suggests reformatting Zeus, but Ryoko's group knows that once the AI is formatted, all critical systems will be shut down, and places him under arrest for suspicion of conspiring sabotage. Leon and his men arrive to arrest Karin but she manages to escape. Kunihito is shocked to see Kuniko and Momoko in his house with his mother, but does nothing. Later he returns Kuniko's old boomerang to her. Leon and his men goes to Mikuni's palace to arrest Mīko.
16	"Forest Frenzy"; Transliteration: "Kyōran Jugoku" (Japanese: 狂乱樹獄)	July 20, 2009	October 10, 2011
Ryoko decides to make Mīko the next vessel for Lord Hiruko. Kuniko returns with Momoko back to Duomo to think of their next step. After being welcomed back by the citizens, Kuniko goes to confront Nagiko about her role as first governor of Atlas. When she gets no answer, Kuniko has no choice but to banish her grandmother from Duomo. Before leaving, Nagiko informs her about Takehiko's disappearance after returning to the town. Mīko is forcibly turned into Hiruko's new vessel. Furukawa shares Kuniko his discovery that the artillery attacks came from a genetically modified plant called Daedalus. Ryoko also discovers this fact, but ignores the plant's threat as it will not be able to harm Atlas, but the same could not be said for Duomo and the rest living below. Kunihito makes his decision to leave the military. Mikuni pulls herself together and plans to attack Atlas to rescue Mīko. Kuniko and her team make their way to the forest to burn down Daedalus, but it retaliates against them. Mikuni fails to have her people kill Ryoko, but the woman brings her to see Mīko, who has turned into Hiruko's vessel. As Mīko's personality fights against Hiruko to speak with Mikuni, Ryoko has security surround Mikuni. Sayoko arrives to take Mīko/Hiruko hostage and leaves Atlas together with Mikuni. Momoko tells Kuniko that Daedalus will one day overwhelm and create a forest full of its plants, due to the bomb shower. As Kuniko contemplates this alone, Takehiko attempts to kill her.
17	"A Dark Night's Resistance"; Transliteration: "An'ya Kōro" (Japanese: 暗夜杭路)	July 27, 2009	October 11, 2011
In her safehouse, Karin finds out that all three Digmas have Atlas AAA ranks, which means they are highly regarded. Takehiko reveals to Kuniko that he was sent by Atlas to guard her. But he has decided to kill her and end Atlas' plans when he found out that they sacrificed children to build the city, including his sister. Kunihito arrives just in time to save Kuniko before Takehiko can kill her. Losing all hope, Takehiko tells Kuniko that AAA rank individuals will inherit Atlas, and he seemingly kills himself by jumping into a storm drain before Kuniko can stop him. Kunihito informs Kuniko that he has quit the army and will try to find his own way. Karin buys Akihabara as her "house". Mikuni and Sayoko arrive to seek refuge at Karin's territory, and place Mīko/Hiruko into a pool for safekeeping. Karin finds out the hard way in pleasing Mikuni. Kuniko and her team investigate the Metal Age's Nerima base, which has lost contact. They discover the entire Nerima base dead from exposure to photo-oxidants spread by Daedalus. Leon takes care of his brother Sion's injury caused by Ryoko's latest beating and tells him to quit if he doesn't like his job. But Sion tells Leon that he doesn't understand him. Kuniko goes to the three old otakus to buy a bomber, but is referred to Akihabara's newest leadership, Karin. Kuniko reveals that she wants to use the bomber to burn Tokyo to the ground, to Karin's shock.
18	"Two-Headed Fable"; Transliteration: "Sōtō Kitan" (Japanese: 双頭奇譚)	August 3, 2009	October 12, 2011
Karin tells Kuniko that she won't be able to sell her so many resources to combat the Daedalus, but she will be able to rent them to her. In exchange, Karin wants Kuniko's sun blade. When Karin recognizes Momoko's earring, she is forced by Momoko to bring her and Kuniko to the other owner of the earring, which is Mikuni. After both sides explain how they got their earring, Kuniko and Mikuni are faced with the prospect that they are sisters. Momoko and Kuniko are also led to the pool to see Hiruko, with Mikuni telling them that Mi-ko is the new vessel for the spirit. Back in Duomo, Kunihito tells Kuniko that the Daedalus has begun to spread in the town and Atlas as well. As Metal Age discuss their options to evacuate Duomo, Nagiko returns. Kuniko questions her grandmother's motives, but she tells the girl that she will need her help in dealing with Daedalus. In exchange, Nagiko wants Kuniko to accompany her to see Ryoko. Kuniko will burn the Daedalus down, in exchange Ryoko will have to allow Duomo and other refugees residence in Atlas. When Ryoko refuses, Kuniko has Kunihito cause an explosion, attracting Daedalus to attack the main power grid. With Kuniko's threat, Ryoko says she will aid her in destroying Daedalus.
19	"Tokyo Airstrike"; Transliteration: "Tōkyō Kūshū" (Japanese: 東京空襲)	August 10, 2009	October 13, 2011
Under the command of Kuniko and Kunihito, the bombers move into position and starts bombing Tokyo. Meanwhile, Atlas allows refugees from other regions to enter the city under close supervision and control from Metal Age members and Duomo citizens. Nagiko and Talsian reunite and play chess, as Nagiko realizes that Ryoko has become selfish and want control over Atlas instead of handing it to the Digmas. Karin continues making profits with the rising carbon coefficient while Akihabara is taking the brunt of the bombings with everyone underground. Kuniko personally bombs Duomo, her old home, which is now gone forever. After confirming the complete purging of Daedalus infestations, the bombers return to base. Ryoko's men conclude that the only infestation left is in Atlas' eighth floor. Not only that, Japan is now the poorest country on the planet. Karin releases Medusa to claim the profits gained from the spiking carbon coefficient, but the AI goes out of control.
20	"Melody of Connection"; Transliteration: "Tsuranari no Shirabe" (Japanese: 連之調音)	August 17, 2009	October 14, 2011
Two weeks have passed since the Daedalus operation. A squadron of UN bombers are sent to deal with the AI at its facility, but are destroyed by yet another typhoon. After visiting the ruins of Duomo, Kunihito brings Kuniko to witness a strange occurrence, where a star-shaped pattern appear on the ground with Atlas at the center when their blades meet. Nagiko and Talsian explain this further, revealing that the symbol first appeared when the second Great Kanto earthquake occurred. When Atlas was built on it, they are unable to stop the oscillations from happening, and used the sacrifice of young girls to Hiruko to stabilize the seismic changes. Kunihito's blade is stolen by Karin and both sun and land blades are presented to Mikuni. Karin intends to make Mikuni the successor so she will get more powerful and richer. Karin is informed by her peers that Medusa intends to destroy the world economy and create another Great Depression. Ryoko tips off the UN to Karin's presence in Akihabara and they send an aerial fortress, Titan, to wipe out the city. An explosion destroys a large part of Akihabara but Mikuni and Sayoko are protected by Mīko/Hiruko, who vanishes after expending his powers.
21	"The Holy Land Lost"; Transliteration: "Seichi Shōshitsu" (Japanese: 聖地消失)	August 24, 2009	October 17, 2011
Karin attempts to keep Medusa under control but the building she's in collapses and she is forced to escape. Kuniko, Kunihito and Momoko arrive just in time to join in the rescue efforts to extract surviving Akihabara citizens. Kuniko talks some sense into a despondent Karin and join forces to prevent Medusa from causing the end of the world. They find the otaku owners, who have survived, to aid them in their operation. Using an independent network provided by the otakus, Karin hacks into the orbital communications satellite Icarus to send it descending onto Medusa's location. However, the celebrations are short-lived, as Medusa remains alive, tapping into the world military networks to prepare to launch warheads and create a nuclear winter. Karin reveals to Kuniko and Kunihito about their statuses as successors to Atlas. In order to use the Zeus AI against Medusa, they have to prevent Mikuni from becoming successor as the control system will only obey her commands. Mikuni ascends a long flight of stairs to Ryoko, who welcomes her to the Endless Forest.
22	"Eternal Bonds"; Transliteration: "Eien no Kizuna" (Japanese: 永遠乃絆)	August 31, 2009	October 18, 2011
Kuniko, Kunihito and Momoko go after Mikuni, who is about to make herself successor of Atlas. Kunihito distracts the guards with gunfire while the other two head in Mikuni's direction. Momoko fights off Sayoko, who attempts to stop them from reaching her mistress, leaving Kuniko to chase after the girl. Kuniko reaches Mikuni and tells her that she can be the successor, but all she wants is to activate the Zeus defense AI, but Sayoko knocks Kuniko down and tells Mikuni to keep moving. Mikuni reaches Ryoko and is told to present the three blade seals to her, though the girl have doubts due to Kuniko's explanation. However, Mikuni is told by Ryoko that she can only be successor if she gets rid of Sayoko. Even though Mikuni doesn't want to, Sayoko sacrifices herself by jumping to her death in order to make her the successor. When Mikuni and Sayoko enter the ceremonial hall, Kuniko grabs Mikuni with her and tells her that all she needs is to speak with Zeus. Upon interacting with a weird device which is used to activate Zeus, Kuniko realizes that Zeus cannot be controlled as she's not the successor. Ryoko reveals herself to be Zeus' avatar, and she easily beats down Kuniko. Despite Kuniko's pleas, Mikuni pushes ahead to destroy the world to avenge Mi-ko's death. When Kuniko tells Ryoko she will stop them, Kunihito appears, pointing his weapon at her.
23	"Prelude to Collapse"; Transliteration: "Hōkai Jokyoku" (Japanese: 崩壊序曲)	September 7, 2009	October 19, 2011
Kunihito apologizes to Kuniko for his apparent betrayal, holding her off while Ryoko escapes to the Eternal Forest with Mikuni. Enraged, Kuniko attacks Kunihito, only to be stopped by Momoko who arrives to tell Kuniko of Kunihito's true motives. It is revealed that Sayoko survived her fall from the upper deck because Momoko intercepted her descent. Ryoko arrives in the chamber once occupied by Hiruko, revealing a hidden passageway into the bowels of Atlas itself. Shogo, Leon, and Sion attempt to stop her, but she eludes them and they descend down through the shaft. Sayoko is quick to follow. She voices Ryoko's motives in forcing Mikuni to become the successor. She attacks Ryoko, but is ultimately knocked off the descending platform, presumably falling to her death. Nagiko and Talsian are seek talking about the hidden catacombs they discovered during Atlas's construction and the secret behind the forbidden relics they uncovered down there. The secret behind Zeus's creation is finally revealed, as well as the system protecting Atlas from violent oscillations and tremors. Back up in the ceremonial chamber, Kuniko and Kunihito finally manage to break through the barrier to the elevator shaft Ryoko took. Kuniko hugs Momoko and Kunihito apologizes for his actions. Kuniko playfully scolds him, saying he apologizes too much, before leaving down the shaft. Meanwhile, Karin is desperately struggling to stop MEDUSA's rampage across the economic markets. Talsian appears on the terminal and declares a way to stop MEDUSA. A rather comical chibi battle ensues and Karin is knocked into a separate field, greeted by the teddy forms of her parents, who reveal the real reason as to their extended absence. It is only a virtual program operated by Ryoko, but it turns out that Karin's parents had died three years before. Karin suffers a breakdown and Ryoko returns to reality to command Mikuni to draw the bejeweled spear and assume her role as successor. Mikuni, however, refuses, but after threats from Ryoko, obliges reluctantly. By now, MEDUSA is about to decimate the world's economy and Kuniko arrives just in time to stop Mikuni from pulling out the spear.
24	"Our Shangri-La"; Transliteration: "Risō Kyōdo" (Japanese: 理想郷土)	September 14, 2009	October 20, 2011
Kuniko's arrival stops Mikuni from drawing the bejeweled spear and Ryoko states how impressed she is that Kuniko made it this far. She challenges Kuniko to pull the spear out herself. When Kuniko refuses, Ryoko takes Mikuni hostage and threatens to kill her, forcing Kuniko's hand and revealing that Kuniko and Mikuni are actually sisters and that their birth mother is no longer alive, but not exactly dead either. It is revealed that Kuniko and Mikuni were artificially created and that Kuniko is in fact a clone of Himiko, the mummy of the goddess discovered beneath Atlas. It turns out that Ryoko's body is failing her and she intends to invade the body of the new successor. Outside, a figure resembling Takehito expresses his disgust at the use of human lives to construct Atlas just before setting off a chain of chemical bombs. MEDUSA has gained complete control of the computer systems. Kuniko is forced to draw the spear in an attempt to stop MEDUSA from starting a nuclear war, but she's too late, as nuclear missiles are launched all across the world, launching incomparable amounts of dust into the already weakened atmosphere. MEDUSA himself predicts a nuclear winter with dropping water levels and temperatures everywhere and finally relaxes, convinced that he's safe at last. But his plans are breached when he opens the floodgates of the islands, thinking them useless and releases a tidal wave crashing toward him. It turns out that the missiles launched were a ruse to get MEDUSA's guard down and release the floodgates holding the water back. MEDUSA drowns in the rising floodwaters and Karin mourns his and her parents' deaths. Angered at the breach in her plan, Ryoko attempts to take over Kuniko, but Kuniko mocks her and a brief skirmish ensues, ending with Kuniko impaling Ryoko on the spear. Ryoko perishes and her life energy is absorbed by Zeus trying to revive Himiko. Sayoko appears in the catacombs, shaken but unharmed. Kuniko is carried away by the spear to the heart of Zeus where she meets Himiko, a duplicate of herself. Himiko plans to use all ten million citizens of Japan to revive herself. Kuniko and Himiko face off, fighting for the future of the world. Kuniko's boomerang slices through the heart of Zeus, shutting the system down and banishing Himiko. Down in the catacombs, Mīko appears to Mikuni with the spirits of Hiruko and all of the sacrificed children. Mīko tells Sayoko to take care of Mikuni, then removes Mikuni's cursed power, as well as her illness. Karin laments the loss of her money, of MEDUSA and of her parents and Klaris and Zhang make their first appearances, claiming to have been worried about their friend, Karin. Karin brings out the microchip that was MEDUSA and it suddenly manifests as a miniature version of the previous program, which Karin reveals as MEDUSA's baby. It quickly recognizes her as 'mommy'. Zhang says that this time, they'll raise it properly. Atlas is destroyed and Kuniko and Kunihito gaze out over the horizon. Kuniko states her dream of creating a Shangri La.

== Volume DVDs ==
Japanese distributor Kadokawa Entertainment released a total of twelve DVD compilations of Shangri-La between July 24, 2009, and June 25, 2010. A limited version release was also available for the first volume that included a guide book to the series, illustrations by character designer Range Murata, and a storage box for all twelve DVD volumes.

Kadokawa Entertainment DVD Releases
Volume	Released	Discs	Episodes	Volume	Released	Discs	Episodes
1	July 24, 2009	1	2	7	January 29, 2010	1	2
2	August 28, 2009	1	2	8	February 26, 2010	1	2
3	September 25, 2009	1	2	9	March 26, 2010	1	2
4	October 30, 2009	1	2	10	April 23, 2010	1	2
5	November 27, 2009	1	2	11	May 28, 2010	1	2
6	December 25, 2009	1	2	12	June 25, 2010	1	2
