= Iou Kuroda =

Japanese manga artist

Iou Kuroda (黒田 硫黄, Kuroda Iō; [kɯɾoda i.oː]; born January 5, 1971) is the pen name of a Japanese manga artist.

== Biography ==
Born in Sapporo as one of two twins, Kuroda moved many times in his youth. He graduated from Hitotsubashi University. The pen name "Kuroda Iou" (in Japanese order) is a combination of his family name (Kuroda) and the name of a toy robot, Mars King (Kasei Daiō): Kuroda + Kasei Daiō -> Kurodaiō -> Kuroda Iō.

Kuroda's works are known for their dynamic plot developments and the rhythm of their stories. His drawings are widely praised for their almost magical appeal. Elephants, cameras, bicycles, ships, robots, and cooking are common motifs in Kuroda's manga.

In 2002, Kuroda won the Excellence Prize at the 2002 Japan Media Arts Festival for his manga Sexy Voice and Robo. In 2007, the manga was adapted into a television drama, starring Kenichi Matsuyama and Suzuka Ohgo, which aired between April and June 2007 on Nippon Television.

In 2003, Kuroda's work Nasu was brought to the attention of animator and director Kitarō Kōsaka by Kōsaka's long-time collaborator from Studio Ghibli, Hayao Miyazaki, a fan of cycling. He adapted the Summer in Andalusia chapter from the manga into the film, Nasu: Summer in Andalusia, which soon went on to become the first Japanese anime film ever to be selected for the Cannes Film Festival. A sequel, Nasu: A Migratory Bird with Suitcase, was also later produced, which won the best Original Video Animation award at the seventh annual Tokyo Anime Awards, held at the 2008 Tokyo International Anime Fair.

== Selected works ==
- Dai Nippon Tengu-tō Ekotoba (大日本天狗党絵詞) (1994–1996)
- Kurofune (黒船)
- Daiō (大王)
- Nasu (茄子) (2000–2002)
- Sexy Voice and Robo (セクシーボイスアンドロボ) (2000–2002)
- Eiga ni Ke ga Sanbon! (映画に毛が3本!)
- Atarashii Asa (あたらしい朝) (2006–2010)
- Appleseed Alpha (アップルシードα) (2014–2015)
