= Nasu (manga) =

Japanese manga series

- First tankōbon volume cover

茄子
- Manga
- Written by: Iou Kuroda
- Published by: Kodansha
- Imprint: Afternoon KC
- Magazine: Monthly Afternoon
- Original run: September 25, 2000 – August 24, 2002
- Volumes: 3
- Related
- Nasu: Summer in Andalusia (2003 film); Nasu: A Migratory Bird with Suitcase (2007 OVA)
- icon

Nasu (Japanese: 茄子; lit. 'Eggplant') is a Japanese manga series written and illustrated by Iou Kuroda. It was serialized in Kodansha's seinen manga magazine Monthly Afternoon from September 2000 to August 2002. In 2003, a story from the series, Summer in Andalusia, was adapted into an anime film, Nasu: Summer in Andalusia. An original video animation (OVA) sequel, Nasu: A Migratory Bird with Suitcase, was released in 2007.

== Plot ==
Nasu is a collection of stories, focusing on a returning series of characters, such as Takama (高間), a farmer, and a young girl named Aya Takahashi (高橋 綾, Takahashi Aya), who begins the series abandoned by her father and residing in Tokyo with her two younger siblings, and as the manga progresses to its second volume, leaves the city to reside in the countryside with her relatives, near Takama's farm. Apart from the chapters concerning Takama and Aya, other stories are also featured, such as one telling the chronicles of samurai in the Edo period hunting forbidden eggplant (茄子, nasu), another set atop a futuristic Mount Fuji, another tale concerning a truck driver, and also "Summer in Andalusia", the story concerning the professional Spanish bicyclist Pepe Benengeli, from which the film was adapted.

== Media ==
=== Manga ===
Written and illustrated by Iou Kuroda, Nasu was serialized in Kodansha's seinen manga magazine Monthly Afternoon from September 25, 2000, (Note: Debuted in the magazine's November 2000 issue, released on September 25, 2000.) to August 24, 2002. (Note: Finished in the magazine's October 2002 issue, released on August 24, 2002.) Kodansha collected its 24 chapters in three tankōbon volumes, released from July 23, 2001, to December 20, 2002.

==== Volumes ====
No.	Release date	ISBN
1	July 23, 2001	978-4-06-314272-3
2	May 23, 2002	978-4-06-314295-2
3	December 20, 2002	978-4-06-314314-0

=== Anime ===
In 2003, Nasu was brought to the attention of animator and director Kitarō Kōsaka by Kōsaka's long-time collaborator from Studio Ghibli, Hayao Miyazaki, a fan of cycling himself. Kōsaka adapted the Summer in Andalusia story from the manga into the film, Nasu: Summer in Andalusia, which soon went on to become the first Japanese anime film ever to be selected for the Cannes Film Festival.

An original video animation (OVA) sequel, Nasu: A Migratory Bird with Suitcase, was produced in 2007 with Kitarō Kōsaka returning as director. The OVA won the best Original Video Animation award at the seventh annual Tokyo Anime Awards, held at the 2008 Tokyo International Anime Fair.
