= Tokyo Anime Award =

Japanese anime awards

- Awarded for: Excellence in animation achievements
- Country: Japan
- Presented by: TAAF Executive Committee, AJA (since 2014); TAF Executive Committee (until 2013)
- First award: 2002
- Website: animefestival.jp (TAAF) tokyoanime.jp (TAF)

The Tokyo Anime Awards started in 2002, but was named in 2005. The first, second and third award ceremonies were simply named 'Competition'. The award ceremonies were held at the Tokyo International Anime Fair (TAF) until 2013. In 2014, after the merger of the Tokyo International Anime Fair with the Anime Contents Expo and the formation of the AnimeJapan convention, the Tokyo Anime Awards was changed into a separate festival called Tokyo Anime Awards Festival (TAAF).

Notably, there are Open Entry Awards for amateur creators (the Grand Prize winner is awarded with one million yen). Though there are ten main judges, the total number of judges is over one hundred people. Various groups participate in judging the festival, such as anime studio staff members, professors of universities, as well as producers and chief editors of various magazines. (See also: Animation Kobe).

== Animation of the Year ==
All anime released from December 1 of the year before the festival to November 30 of the current year in Japan become candidates. The anime that best represents the category in which it was nominated will be chosen as the winner of that category.

In the first year of the celebration, the award was given to Spirited Away as 'Grand Prix'. In the second year, there was no Animation of the Year award; therefore, the 'Best Entry Awards' in the 'Notable Entries' are often recognized as 'Grand Prix', they were: Millennium Actress (film), Hanada Shōnen-shi (TV) and Sentō Yōsei Yukikaze (OVA)

Since 2014, the Tokyo Anime Award Festival has awarded a grand prize for anime of the year in two categories, film and television.

Tokyo Anime Award
Year	Winner	Note
2002	Spirited Away	Grand Prix
2003	Not awarded	
2004	Mobile Suit Gundam Seed	
2005	Howl's Moving Castle	
2006	Fullmetal Alchemist the Movie: Conqueror of Shamballa	
2007	The Girl Who Leapt Through Time	
2008	Evangelion: 1.0 You Are (Not) Alone	
2009	Ponyo	
2010	Summer Wars	
2011	The Secret World of Arrietty	
2012	From up on Poppy Hill	
2013	Wolf Children	
Tokyo Anime Award Festival^{a}
2014	The Wind Rises	Film Category
2014	Attack on Titan	Television Category
2015	Frozen	Film Category
2015	Ping Pong the Animation	Television Category
2016	Love Live! The School Idol Movie	Film Category
2016	Shirobako	Television Category
2017	A Silent Voice	Film Category
2017	Yuri!!! on Ice	Television Category
2018	In This Corner of the World	Film Category
2018	Kemono Friends	Television Category
2019	Detective Conan: Zero the Enforcer	Film Category
2019	Zombie Land Saga	Television Category
2020	Weathering with You	Film Category
2020	Demon Slayer: Kimetsu no Yaiba	Television Category
2021	Violet Evergarden: The Movie	Film Category
2021	Keep Your Hands Off Eizouken!	Television Category
2022	Evangelion: 3.0+1.0 Thrice Upon a Time	Film Category
2022	Jujutsu Kaisen	Television Category
2023	One Piece Film: Red	Film Category
2023	Spy × Family	Television Category
2024	The First Slam Dunk	Film Category
2024	Oshi no Ko	Television Category
2025	Look Back	Film Category
2025	Frieren: Beyond Journey's End	Television Category
2026	Demon Slayer: Kimetsu no Yaiba – The Movie: Infinity Castle	Film Category
2026	Mobile Suit Gundam GQuuuuuuX	Television Category

Notes
a. Anime of the Year Grand Prize for Best Picture

== Anime Fan Award ==
Picking from over 300-400 titles from television and films, anime fans vote from the candidate pool to pick the best 100 from those titles, with 20 of these titles being films and 80 being television titles. Fans then participate in a runoff vote in order to determine a recipient amongst the 100 chosen titles for the Anime Fan Award.

Initial qualifications to become candidates required titles to have aired from November of the year before the festival to October of the current year in Japan. However, this has since been twice changed — first in 2017 to be from October to October, and again in 2020 to be from October to September.

Tokyo Anime Award Festival
Year	Winner	Note
2014	Danball Senki Wars	
2015	Tiger & Bunny: The Rising	
2016	Gintama	
2017	Yuri on Ice	The only title to win the award twice consecutively.
2018	Yuri on Ice	The only title to win the award twice consecutively.
2019	Banana Fish	
2020	Uta no Prince-Sama: Maji Love Kingdom	
2021	Idolish7: Second Beat!	
2022	Idolish7: Third Beat!	Only applies to the 1st Cour.
2023	Mechamato	The first non-Japanese-produced animation to win in this category.
2024	Idolish7 The Movie: Live 4bit Beyond The Period	
2025	Birth of Kitarō: The Mystery of GeGeGe	

== Open Entries / Competition Grand Prize ==
The awards for the creator of the non-commercialized work for TV, movie and OVA, to find new talents and to provide support for subsequent commercialization. The work must be an animation longer than 15 seconds, and no longer than 30 minutes. If the work was not commercialized before, professional creator also can enter this Grand Prize. The 2007 winner, Flutter, was the first work from a non-Asian country to win this award.

Tokyo Anime Award
Year	Winner	Title	Note
2002	(Japan) Youhei Takamatsu	Tokyo Animarathon^{b}	
2003	(South Korea) Jung Min-Young	Say My Name^{c}	
2004	(South Korea) Han Tae-Ho	Africa a.F.r.I.c.A	
2005	(Japan) Shin Hosokawa	The Demon	
2006	(Japan) Kazuo Ebisawa	Crow that wears clothes	
2007	(Canada) Howie Shia	Flutter	
2008	(Taiwan) Helen Huang	Adventures in the NPM	
2009	(Germany) Heiko van der Scherm	Descendants	
2010	(Japan) G9+1	Tokyo Fantasia	
2011	(France) Alice Dieudonne	Trois petits points	
2012	(China) Chen Xifeng	Pig Sale	
2013	(Taiwan) Tsai Shiu-Cheng	Time of Cherry Blossoms	
Tokyo Anime Award Festival^{d}
2014	(Israel) Ari Folman	The Congress	Featured Film Category
2014	(France) Augusto Zanovello	Lettres de femmes	Short Film Category
2015	(Republic of Ireland) Tomm Moore	Song of the Sea	Featured Film Category
2015	(Russia) Konstantin Bronzit	We Can't Live Without Cosmos	Short Film Category
2016	(France) Rémi Chayé	Long Way North	Featured Film Category
2016	(Croatia) Siniša Mataić	Off Belay	Short Film Category
2017	(France) Sébastien Laudenbach	The Girl Without Hands	Feature Film Category
2017	(France) Elice Meng	Of Shadows and Wings...	Short Film Category
2018	(Taiwan) Hsin Yin Sung	On Happiness Road	Feature Film Category
2018	(France) Ru Kuwahata, Max Porter	Negative Space	Short Film Category
2019	(Poland) Raúl de la Fuente, Damian Nenow	Another Day of Life	Feature Film Category
2019	(Belgium) Nienke Deutz	Bloeistraat 11	Short Film Category

Notes
b. Best Entry Award in Amateur Category
c. Best Entry Award in Student Category
d. Competition Winning Programs

== Notable Entry ==
The excellent works of the year are chosen according to each section.

=== Television Category ===
The TV animations broadcast from December 1 of the year beforehand to November 30 of the previous year in Japan become candidates.

The 'Best Entry' was selected only in 2003: Hanada Shōnen-shi.

Tokyo Anime Award
Year	Winner
2002	Inuyasha
2002	Ojamajo Doremi #
2002	Hikaru no Go
2002	Fruits Basket
2002	One Piece
2003	Hanada Shōnen-shi
2003	Inuyasha
2003	Overman King Gainer
2004	Astro Boy
2004	Mobile Suit Gundam SEED
2004	Fullmetal Alchemist
2005	Gankutsuou: The Count of Monte Cristo
2005	Sgt. Frog
2005	Futari wa Pretty Cure
2006	Eureka Seven
2006	Black Jack
2006	Mushishi
2007	Code Geass: Lelouch of the Rebellion
2007	The Melancholy of Haruhi Suzumiya
2007	Death Note
2008	Dennō Coil
2008	Tengen Toppa Gurren-Lagann
2009	Macross Frontier
2009	Code Geass: Lelouch of the Rebellion R2
2010	Eden of the East
2010	K-On!
2011	K-On!!
2011	The Tatami Galaxy
2012	Puella Magi Madoka Magica
2012	Tiger & Bunny
2013	Kuroko's Basketball
2013	Sword Art Online
Tokyo Anime Award Festival
2014	Space Brothers
2015	Yo-Kai Watch
2016	Shirobako
2017	Yuri!!! on Ice
2018	Kemono Friends
2019	Zombie Land Saga
2020	Demon Slayer: Kimetsu no Yaiba
2021	Keep Your Hands Off Eizouken!
2022	Jujutsu Kaisen
2023	Spy × Family
2024	Oshi no Ko
2025	Frieren: Beyond Journey's End
2026	Mobile Suit Gundam GQuuuuuuX

=== Domestic Feature Film Category ===
The animation films released from December 1 of the year beforehand to November 30 of the previous year in Japan become candidates.

The 'Best Entry' was selected only in 2003: Millennium Actress.

Tokyo Anime Award
Year	Winner
2002	Princess Arete
2002	Spirited Away
2002	Metropolis
2003	Millennium Actress
2003	The Cat Returns
2003	Crayon Shin-chan: The Storm Called: The Battle of the Warring States
2004	Tokyo Godfathers
2004	Nasu: Summer in Andalusia
2005	Ghost in the Shell 2: Innocence
2005	Steamboy
2006	Detective Conan: Strategy Above the Depths
2006	Zeta Gundam: A New Translation - Heirs to the Stars
2007	Paprika
2007	Arashi no Yoru ni
2008	Summer Days with Coo
2009	Ponyo
2010	Summer Wars
2011	The Secret World of Arrietty
2012	From Up on Poppy Hill
2013	Wolf Children
Tokyo Anime Award Festival
2014	The Wind Rises
2015	Stand by Me Doraemon
2016	Love Live! The School Idol Movie
2017	A Silent Voice
2018	In This Corner of the World
2019	Detective Conan: Zero the Enforcer
2020	Weathering with You
2021	Violet Evergarden: The Movie
2022	Evangelion: 3.0+1.0 Thrice Upon a Time
2023	One Piece Film: Red
2024	The First Slam Dunk
2025	Look Back
2026	Demon Slayer: Kimetsu no Yaiba – The Movie: Infinity Castle

=== OVA Category ===
The Original Video Animations (OVAs) released from December 1 of the year beforehand to November 30 of the previous year in Japan become candidates.

The 'Best Entry' was selected only in 2003: Sentō Yōsei Yukikaze. Sentō Yōsei Yukikaze (2003 and 2006) and Diebuster (2005 and 2007) were awarded two times.

Tokyo Anime Award
Year	Winner
2002	Animation Runner Kuromi
2003	Sentō Yōsei Yukikaze
2003	Return of the Magician
2003	JoJo's Bizarre Adventure
2004	The Animatrix
2004	Macross Zero
2005	Animation Runner Kuromi 2
2005	Diebuster
2006	Karas
2006	Sentō Yōsei Yukikaze
2007	Diebuster
2007	Freedom
2008	Nasu: A Migratory Bird with Suitcase
2009	Detroit Metal City
2010	Time of Eve
2011	Mobile Suit Gundam Unicorn
2012	Mobile Suit Gundam Unicorn
2013	Not awarded

=== International Theater Award ===
The international animation films released from December 1 of the year beforehand to November 30 of the previous year in Japan become candidates.

Founded in 2003. One work is selected and awards presented every year.

Tokyo Anime Award
Year	Winner
2003	Monsters, Inc.
2004	Lilo & Stitch
2005	Finding Nemo
2006	The Incredibles
2007	Cars
2008	Ratatouille
2009	Kung Fu Panda
2010	WALL-E
2011	Toy Story 3
2012	Tangled
2013	The Adventures of Tintin: The Secret of the Unicorn

== Individual awards ==
The individual awards for the activities of the previous year.

=== Best Director ===
The awards for directors. Though this award does not limit to the directors of films, it has a tendency to be given to film directors.

Tokyo Anime Award
Year	Winner	Directed	Note
2002	Akitaro Daichi		TV category
2002	Hayao Miyazaki		Film category
2003	Keiichi Hara	Crayon Shin-chan: The Storm Called: The Battle of the Warring States	Film
2004	Satoshi Kon	Tokyo Godfathers	Film
2005	Hayao Miyazaki	Howl's Moving Castle	Film
2006	Yoshiyuki Tomino	Mobile Suit Zeta Gundam A New Translation: Heirs to the Stars	Film
2007	Mamoru Hosoda	The Girl Who Leapt Through Time	Film
2008	Hideaki Anno	Evangelion: 1.0 You Are (Not) Alone	Film
2009	Hayao Miyazaki	Ponyo	Film
2010	Mamoru Hosoda	Summer Wars	Film
2011	Hiromasa Yonebayashi	The Secret World of Arrietty	Film
2012	Akiyuki Shinbo	Puella Magi Madoka Magica	TV series
2013	Mamoru Hosoda	Wolf Children	Film
Tokyo Anime Award Festival
2014	Tetsurō Araki		
2015	Isao Takahata		
2016	Yōichi Fujita		
2017	Makoto Shinkai		
2018	Tatsuki		
2019	Yoshiaki Kyōgoku		
2020	Makoto Shinkai		
2021	Haruo Sotozaki		
2022	Hideaki Anno		
2023	Gorō Taniguchi		
2024	Takehiko Inoue		
2025	Kiyotaka Oshiyama		
2026	Yohei Kameyama	Milky Subway: The Galactic Limited Express	

=== Best Original Story ===
The awards for the original creators of the work. Founded in 2005.

Tokyo Anime Award
Year	Winner	Original Story of	Note
2005	Masamune Shirow	Ghost in the Shell 2: Innocence	Manga
2006	Hiromu Arakawa	Fullmetal Alchemist	Manga
2007	Yasutaka Tsutsui	The Girl Who Leapt Through Time	Novel
2008	Taiyō Matsumoto	Tekkon Kinkreet	Manga
2009	Hayao Miyazaki	Ponyo	
2010	Mamoru Hosoda	Summer Wars	
2013	Reki Kawahara	Sword Art Online	Light novel

=== Best Screenplay ===
The awards for screenwriters.

Tokyo Anime Award
Year	Winner	Screenplay of	Note
2002	Takashi Yamada		TV category
2002	Hayao Miyazaki		Film category
2003	Ichirō Ōkouchi	Overman King Gainer	TV series
2004	Sho Aikawa	Fullmetal Alchemist	TV series
2005	Mamoru Oshii	Ghost in the Shell 2: Innocence	Film
2006	Dai Satō	Eureka Seven	TV series
2007	Satoko Okudera	The Girl Who Leapt Through Time	Film
2008	Keiichi Hara	Summer Days with Coo	Film
2009	Ichirō Ōkouchi	Code Geass: Lelouch of the Rebellion R2	TV series
2010	Satoko Okudera	Summer Wars	Film
2011	Miho Maruo	Colorful	Film
2012	Gen Urobuchi	Puella Magi Madoka Magica	TV series
2013	Satoko Okudera; Mamoru Hosoda	Wolf Children	Film

=== Best Screenplay / Original Story ===
The awards for screenwriters since 2014.

Tokyo Anime Award Festival
Year	Winner	Note
2014	Yasuko Kobayashi	
2014	Hayao Miyazaki	
2014	Reiko Yoshida	
2015	Jukki Hanada	
2016	Shū Matsubara	
2017	Reiko Yoshida	
2018	Kinoko Nasu	
2019	Jukki Hanada	
2020	Koyoharu Gotouge	
2021	Reiko Yoshida	
2022	Hideaki Anno	
2023	Reiko Yoshida	
2024	Takehiko Inoue	
2025	Hiroyuki Yoshino	
2026	Uoto	

=== Best Art Direction ===
The awards for the staffs of art direction.

Tokyo Anime Award
Year	Winner	Art Direction of	Note
2002	Yuji Ikeda		TV category
2002	Yōji Takeshige		Film category
2003	Nobutaka Ike	Millennium Actress	Film
2004	Nobutaka Ike	Tokyo Godfathers	Film
2005	Shinji Kimura	Steamboy	Film
2006	Takeshi Waki	Mushishi	TV series
2007	Nizo Yamamoto	The Girl Who Leapt Through Time	Film
2008	Shinji Kimura	Tekkon Kinkreet	Film
2009	Noboru Yoshida	Ponyo	Film
2010	Yōji Takeshige	Summer Wars	Film
2011	Yōji Takeshige	The Secret World of Arrietty	Film
2012	Takumi Tanji	Children Who Chase Lost Voices	Film
2013	Hiroshi Ohno	Wolf Children	Film
2013	Hiroshi Ohno	A Letter to Momo	Film
Tokyo Anime Award Festival
2014	Yōji Takeshige		
2015	Kazuo Oga		
2017	Shunichiro Yoshihara		
2020	Mikiko Watanabe	Violet Evergarden: Eternity and the Auto Memory Doll	Watanabe was among the 36 killed as result of the Kyoto Animation arson attack and was awarded posthumously for her work.
2021	Mikiko Watanabe	Violet Evergarden: The Movie	Watanabe was again awarded posthumously for her work.
2025	Mai Ichioka		
2026	Yusuke Takeda	Chainsaw Man – The Movie: Reze Arc	

=== Best Character Designer ===
The awards for character designers.

Tokyo Anime Award
Year	Winner	Character Design of	Note
2002	Masatomo Sudo		TV category
2002	Hayao Miyazaki		Film category
2003	Kōsuke Fujishima	Sakura Wars	Film
2004	Hisashi Hirai	Mobile Suit Gundam SEED	TV series
2005	Hiroyuki Okiura	Ghost in the Shell 2: Innocence	Film
2006	Ken'ichi Yoshida	Eureka Seven	TV series
2007	Yoshiyuki Sadamoto	The Girl Who Leapt Through Time	Film
2008	Atsushi Nishigori	Tengen Toppa Gurren-Lagann	TV series
2009	Tetsuya Nishio	The Sky Crawlers	Film
2010	Yoshiyuki Sadamoto	Summer Wars	Film
2011	Yoshihiko Umakoshi	HeartCatch PreCure!	TV series
2012	Masakazu Katsura	Tiger & Bunny	TV series
2013	Yoshiyuki Sadamoto	Wolf Children	Film
Tokyo Anime Award Festival
2014	Sushio		
2015	Takahiro Kishida		
2016	Naoyuki Asano		

=== Best Voice Actor ===
The awards for voice actors by their performance. Rumi Hiiragi (2002) and Chieko Baisho (2005) are more famous as actress in Japan.

Tokyo Anime Award
Year	Winner	Acted as	Note
2002	Kurumi Mamiya		TV category
2002	Rumi Hiiragi		Film category
2003	Kappei Yamaguchi	InuYasha	
2004	Romi Park	Edward Elric	
2005	Chieko Baisho	Sophie (Howl's Moving Castle)	Film
2006	Akio Ōtsuka	Black Jack (Black Jack)	TV series
2007	Aya Hirano	Haruhi Suzumiya (The Melancholy of Haruhi Suzumiya)	TV series
2008	Mamoru Miyano	Setsuna F. Seiei (Mobile Suit Gundam 00)	TV series
2008	Mamoru Miyano	Light Yagami (Death Note)	TV series
2009	Jun Fukuyama	Lelouch Lamperouge (Code Geass: Lelouch of the Rebellion R2)	TV series
2010	Hiroshi Kamiya	Koyomi Araragi (Bakemonogatari)	TV series
2011	Aki Toyosaki	Yui Hirasawa (K-On!!)	TV series
2012	Hiroaki Hirata	Kotetsu T. Kaburagi/Wild Tiger (Tiger & Bunny)	TV series
2013	Yuki Kaji	Amata Sora (Aquarion Evol)	TV series
2013	Yuki Kaji	Haruyuki Arita (Accel World)	TV series
Tokyo Anime Award Festival
2014	Hideaki Anno		
2015	Daisuke Ono		
2015	Koki Uchiyama		

=== Best Music ===
The awards for composers (and other music related people).

Tokyo Anime Award
Year	Winner	Music of	Note
2002	Kōhei Tanaka		TV category
2002	Joe Hisaishi		Film category
2003	Yoko Kanno	Ghost in the Shell: Stand Alone Complex	TV series
2004	Yoko Kanno		
2005	Joe Hisaishi	Howl's Moving Castle	Film
2006	Michiru Oshima	Fullmetal Alchemist	TV series
2007	Susumu Hirasawa	Paprika	Film
2008	Yoko Kanno	Genesis of Aquarion	TV series
2009	Yoko Kanno	Macross Frontier	TV series
2010	Shiro Sagisu	Evangelion: 2.0 You Can (Not) Advance	Film
2011	Cécile Corbel	The Secret World of Arrietty	Film
2012	Satoshi Takebe	From Up On Poppy Hill	Film
2013	Yoko Kanno	Kids on the Slope	TV series
2013	Yoko Kanno	Aquarion Evol	TV series
Tokyo Anime Award Festival
2014	Hiroyuki Sawano		
2015	Hiroyuki Sawano		
2017	Hiroyuki Sawano		
2018	Yuki Kajiura		
2019	Mamoru Miyano		
2020	Yuki Kajiura		
2021	Yuki Kajiura		
2022	Yuki Kajiura; Go Shiina		
2023	Ado		
2024	Yoasobi		
2025	Evan Call		
2026	Kenshi Yonezu	Chainsaw Man – The Movie: Reze Arc; Mobile Suit Gundam GQuuuuuuX	

=== Best Animator ===
The awards for animators since 2014.

Tokyo Anime Award Festival
Year	Winner	Note
2014	Kitarō Kōsaka	
2015	Kumiko Takahashi	
2015	Nobutake Itō	
2015	Osamu Tanabe	
2016	Chikashi Kubota	
2017	Tadashi Hiramatsu	
2018	Takahiro Kishida	
2019	Hitomi Kariya	
2020	Akira Matsushima	
2021	Akira Matsushima	
2022	Akira Matsushima	
2023	Yoshimichi Kameda	
2024	Takeshi Honda	
2025	Tōko Yatabe	
2026	Shuto Enomoto	

=== Merit Award ===
Director

Year	Winner	Note
2009	Hiroshi Sasagawa	
2010	Isao Takahata	
2011	Tomoharu Katsumata	
2012	Osamu Dezaki	
2013	Noboru Ishiguro	
2014	Kimio Yabuki	
2015	Toshio Hirata	
2016	Toyoo Ashida	
2017	Hiroshi Ikeda	
2018	Tsutomu Shibayama	
2019	Hisayuki Toriumi	

Voice Actor

Year	Winner	Note
2006	Mari Shimizu	
2007	Nobuyo Ōyama, Noriko Ohara, Michiko Nomura, Kaneta Kimotsuki and Kazuya Tatekabe	
2009	Jōji Yanami	
2010	Seizō Katō	
2011	Midori Katō, Ichirō Nagai, Miyoko Asō and Takako Sasuga	
2012	Masako Nozawa	
2013	Tōru Ōhira	
2014	Chikao Ohtsuka	
2015	Hiroshi Ōtake	
2016	Yoshiko Ōta	
2017	Eiko Masuyama	
2018	Kiyoshi Kobayashi	
2019	Kazuko Sugiyama	
2020	Masako Ikeda	
2021	Michio Hazama	
2022	Shōzō Iizuka	

== See also ==
- List of animation awards
- Lists of animated feature films
- BAFTA Award for Best Animated Film
- Annie Award for Best Animated Feature
- Golden Globe Award for Best Animated Feature Film
- Critics' Choice Movie Award for Best Animated Feature
- Crunchyroll Anime Awards
- Annie Award for Best Animated Feature — Independent
- Saturn Award for Best Animated Film
- Japan Media Arts Festival
- Animation Kobe
