= Nasu: Summer in Andalusia =

2003 Japanese film by Kitarō Kōsaka

- Japanese theatrical poster
- Directed by: Kitarō Kōsaka
- Written by: Kitarō Kōsaka
- Based on: Nasu by Iou Kuroda
- Produced by: Masao Maruyama
- Starring: Yo Oizumi; Eiko Koike; Toshio Kakei
- Edited by: Takeshi Seyama
- Music by: Toshiyuki Honda
- Production company: Madhouse
- Distributed by: Asmik Ace Entertainment
- Release dates: May 18, 2003 (Cannes); July 26, 2003 (Japan)
- Running time: 47 minutes
- Country: Japan
- Language: Japanese

Nasu: Summer in Andalusia (Japanese: 茄子 アンダルシアの夏, Hepburn: Nasu: Andarushia no Natsu) is a 2003 Japanese anime film by Madhouse, directed by Kitarō Kōsaka – a long-time collaborator of Studio Ghibli and the animation supervisor for Spirited Away and Princess Mononoke. The film is based on "Summer in Andalusia", a story in the manga series Nasu by Iou Kuroda.

Kōsaka became interested in adapting the work after his long-time collaborator Hayao Miyazaki himself, a fan of cycling, recommended the manga to Kōsaka. The film soon went on to become the first Japanese anime film ever to be selected for the Cannes Film Festival, premiering in the Directors' Fortnight section on May 18, 2003. It was theatrically released in Japan on July 26, 2003.

Nasu: Summer in Andalusia has been translated and dubbed into English by the anime television network Animax, which has broadcast the film in Southeast Asia, the Indian subcontinent, and other regions. It was also translated into French, under the title Nasu – Un été andalou, Italian, as Melanzane – Estate andalusa, and German, as Nasu – Sommer in Andalusien. AnimEigo released the film on Blu-ray on March 11, 2025, in the United States.

A sequel, Nasu: A Migratory Bird with Suitcase, set in Japan on the Japan Cup Cycle Road Race, was released in 2007. Directed by Kitarō Kōsaka, it featured Ken'ichi Yoshida, another long-time collaborator of Studio Ghibli, who has worked on several Studio Ghibli films such as Princess Mononoke and Porco Rosso, as animation director. In 2008, Nasu: A Migratory Bird with Suitcase won the best Original Video Animation award at the seventh annual Tokyo Anime Awards, held at the 2008 Tokyo International Anime Fair.

== Plot ==
Nasu: Summer in Andalusia follows the story of a professional Spanish cyclist, Pepe Benengeli, as he competes in the Vuelta a España road bicycle race through his home town in the Iberian region of Andalusia. As the story progresses, Pepe is faced with frustrating consequences, with him facing pressure from his sponsors and the wedding of his former girlfriend, Carmen, to his elder brother, Ángel, coinciding on the same day of the penultimate stage of the bicycle race. Pepe is meant to be a backup racer (domestique) whose job is to assist his more prominent teammate to win the race. However he overhears a conversation in his sponsor's van through his radio com-link which had been negligently left open, and learns that his sponsor intends to fire him after the race. Realizing that he may not find another team for the next season and that he has nothing left to lose, he disregards his instructions and sets out to win the race for himself.

== Influences ==
Some of the teams or riders in the race are influenced by name and/or uniform by actual cycling teams or riders in the early 2000s. Zamenhoff's team Pamei, for example, is named after prominent cycling team Mapei. Bazel's team P-Phone, and its sprint train strategy, is comparable to that of the Telekom team of Erik Zabel, who Bazel is named after. Zabel was one of the most prominent sprinters of all time, winning many stages in the Grand Tours.

== Credits ==
Nasu: Summer in Andalusia was produced by the anime studio, Madhouse, and directed and written by Kitarō Kōsaka, the famed animation supervisor of the Oscar-winning anime film, Spirited Away and Princess Mononoke, and long-time collaborator of Studio Ghibli, and was his theatrical film directorial debut. The music for the film was conducted by Toshiyuki Honda, and its sound was produced by Masafumi Mima. Its directors of photography were Katsuyoshi Kishi and Hisao Shirai, its art director was Naoya Tanaka and its editing was done by Takeshi Seyama. Its producer was Masao Maruyama and its executive producer was Tamotsu Shiina.

=== Cast ===
- Yo Oizumi – Pepe
- Eiko Koike – Carmen
- Hiroaki Hirata – Francisco
- Masahiko Tanaka – Ciocci
- Minoru Hirano – Hernández
- Mitsumasa Daigo – Zulbarán
- Rintarō Nishi – Pizarro
- Seiji Sasaki – Zamenhoff
- Toshio Kakei – Ángel
- Yūko Kaida – Woman A
- Yūshi Satō – Gilmore

== Staff ==
- Original Work: Iou Kuroda's Nasu
- Director, Screenplay, Animation Director: Kitarō Kōsaka
- Episode Direction: Atsushi Takahashi
- Producer: Masao Maruyama
- Ending Theme: Kiyoshiro Imawano
- Music: Toshiyuki Honda
- Production: Madhouse
- Special Assistance: Nihon Jitensha Shinkōkai
- Production: Nasu: Summer in Andalusia Production Committee

== See also ==
- List of films about bicycles and cycling
