= Sexy Voice and Robo =

Japanese manga series

- First tankōbon volume cover, featuring Nico Hayashi

セクシーボイスアンドロボ (Sekushī Boisu Ando Robo)
- Genre: Mystery
- Manga
- Written by: Iou Kuroda
- Published by: Shogakukan
- English publisher: NA: Viz Media
- Imprint: Big Comics Ikki
- Magazine: Spirits Zōkan Ikki
- Original run: November 30, 2000 – December 25, 2002
- Volumes: 2
- Television drama
- Directed by: Tōya Satō
- Original network: Nippon TV
- Original run: April 10, 2007 – June 19, 2007
- Episodes: 11
- icon

Sexy Voice and Robo (Japanese: セクシーボイスアンドロボ, Hepburn: Sekushī Boisu Ando Robo) is a Japanese manga series written and illustrated by Iou Kuroda. It was originally serialized in the seinen manga magazine Spirits Zōkan Ikki (re-branded as Monthly Ikki in 2003) between November 2000 and December 2002, with its chapters collected in two tankōbon volumes. Sexy Voice and Robo is currently unfinished. Kuroda stated that he had planned to continued the story some day. The series was licensed for English release in North America by Viz Media, who released it in a single volume in July 2005. It was adapted into a 11-episode Japanese television drama, which aired on Nippon TV between April and June 2007.

In 2002, Sexy Voice and Robo received the Grand Prize of the sixth Japan Media Arts Festival.

== Plot ==
The story is about the adventures of a 14-year-old girl named Nico Hayashi, who uses her talents of changing and altering her voice to manipulate men over the phone who want to participate in enjo kōsai. Through this she learns a lot about human nature, and gains a keen understanding of people through their voices. An aging gangster notices her talents and decides to hire her to solve various cases. While Nico is on her first case, she meets with a geeky man named Iichiro Sudo, who has an obsession with robot toy models. This obsession that leads Nico to call him "Robo", and the two become an unlikely team. After completing her first case Nico proclaims herself "Sexy Voice" and a variety of short loosely linked character-driven adventures ensue.

== Characters ==
Iichiro Sudo (須藤威一郎, Sudō Iichirō) / Robo (ロボ)
Portrayed by: Kenichi Matsuyama
Nico Hayashi (林二湖, Hayashi Niko) / Nico (ニコ, Niko)
Portrayed by: Suzuka Ohgo

== Media ==
=== Manga ===
Sexy Voice and Robo is written and illustrated by Iou Kuroda. It was serialized in Shogakukan's Spirits Zōkan Ikki (re-branded as Monthly Ikki in 2003) from November 30, 2000, to December 25, 2002. Shogakukan published the chapters into two tankōbon volumes, released on November 30, 2001, and February 28, 2003. Sexy Voice and Robo was unfinished. In January 2007, Kuroda stated on his blog that he planned to write a continuation some day. In 2016, Kodansha republished the series with new cover illustrations and two additional stories on March 23 and April 22.

In North America, Viz Media released the series in a single 400-page volume on July 19, 2005.

==== Volumes ====
No.	Original release date	Original ISBN	English release date	English ISBN
1	November 30, 2001	4-09-188231-5	July 19, 2005	978-1-59116-916-1
01. "Sexy Voice is 14 Years Old" (セクシーボイスは14 歳, Sekushī Boisu wa 14-sai); 02. "A Woman Like the Ocean" (女は海, On'na wa umi); 03. "Target the Ace!" (エースを狙え！, Ēsu o Nerae!); 04. "The Man in the Tower" (タワーの男, Tawā no Otoko); 05. "Vacances au Japon" (日本のバカンス, Nihon no Bakansu); 06. "The Ring and the Gangster" (指輪とギャングスター, Yubiwa to Gyangusutā); Bonus. "Junction"
2	February 28, 2003	4-09-188232-3	July 19, 2005	978-1-59116-916-1
07. "Touch Blue Sky" (さわって青空, Sawatte Ao Zora); 08. "Three Days to Heaven" (三日坊主の天国, Mikkabōzu no Tengoku); 09. "The Old Man's Phone" (おじいさんの電話, Ojīsan no Denwa); 10. "A Night of Partying" (一夜で豪遊, Ichiya de Gōyū); 11. "The Key" (鍵, Kagi); 12. "The Message Game" (伝言ゲーム, Dengon Gēmu); 13. "The Message Game Plays On" (伝言ゲームはつづく, Dengon Gēmu wa Tsudzuku); Bonus. "Detective M"

=== Drama ===
An 11-episode Japanese television drama, starring Kenichi Matsuyama as Robo and Suzuka Ohgo as Nico, was broadcast on Nippon TV from April 10 to June 19, 2007.

== Reception ==
Sexy Voice and Robo won the Grand Prize of the Manga Division at the sixth Japan Media Arts Festival in 2002.
