= One Piece: The Cursed Holy Sword =

2004 film by Kazuhisa Takenōchi

- Film poster

Japanese name
- Kanji: ONE PIECE 呪われた聖剣
Transcriptions
- Revised Hepburn: Wan Pīsu: Norowareta Seiken
- Directed by: Kazuhisa Takenōchi
- Screenplay by: Yoshiyuki Suga
- Based on: One Piece by Eiichiro Oda
- Starring: Mayumi Tanaka; Kazuya Nakai; Akemi Okamura; Kappei Yamaguchi; Hiroaki Hirata; Ikue Ōtani; Yuriko Yamaguchi
- Cinematography: Yoshitada Ishii; Masaru Sakanishi
- Edited by: Shinichi Fukumitsu
- Music by: Kōhei Tanaka; Shirō Hamaguchi
- Production company: Toei Animation
- Distributed by: Toei Company, Ltd.
- Release date: March 6, 2004
- Running time: 95 minutes
- Country: Japan
- Language: Japanese
- Box office: ¥1.8 billion

One Piece: The Cursed Holy Sword (Japanese: ONE PIECE 呪われた聖剣, Hepburn: Wan Pīsu Norowareta Seiken) is a 2004 anime fantasy action-adventure film directed by Kazuhisa Takenouchi and written by Yoshiyuki Suga. It is the fifth feature film in the One Piece film series. Its plot is mostly focused on Straw Hat Pirates member Roronoa Zoro.

== Plot ==
Zoro is lured away from the crew by henchmen of his childhood friend Saga. In search of Zoro, the Straw Hat Pirates encounter the young priestess Maya. Luffy and Usopp becomes lost and meet Saga, while Saga's men attack Maya's village. Zoro, alongside them, takes three purple orbs from Maya, which none of Saga's men can touch. Luffy fights Saga, but during the encounter falls off a high cliff, causing Usopp to jump after him. Zoro returns to Saga with the orbs and disposes of them in a well.

Luffy and Usopp find a tunnel system and explore it where they stumble upon the orbs and take them along. While in the village the remaining Straw Hats hear about the evil Seven-Star Sword, that has taken control of Saga, and the stolen orbs needed to seal the sword's power, when Luffy and Usopp emerge from the ground in front of them. After hearing the story, the Straw Hats decide to help. Zoro learns that Saga is controlled by the Seven-Star Sword and that Saga plans to make him the sword's first sacrifice. They start a fight during which Zoro attempts to destroy the cursed blade.

Using the orbs, Maya performs a ritual to keep the sword's power from fully awakening. Saga defeats Zoro, but before he can kill him, the ritual catches his attention and hurries to interrupt it. With the sword's power unfolding, Saga fights Luffy a second time. During their fight, the sword crumbles and its power is transferred into Saga's body. Zoro appears where he takes over for Luffy and defeats Saga. After the cursed power leaves Saga's body and his mind is freed from the evil influence, the Straw Hats set sail for their next adventure.

== Cast ==
- Mayumi Tanaka as Monkey D. Luffy
- Kazuya Nakai as Roronoa Zoro
- Akemi Okamura as Nami
- Kappei Yamaguchi as Usopp
- Hiroaki Hirata as Sanji
- Ikue Ōtani as Tony Tony Chopper
- Yuriko Yamaguchi as Nico Robin
- Ryouka Yuzuki as Maya
- Shidou Nakamura as Saga
- Masami Hisamoto as Izaya
- Hiroki Uchi as Toma
- Seiji Sasaki as Bismarck
- Takeshi Aono as Boo Kong
- Fumihiko Tachiki as Lacos
- Eiji Takemoto as Drake

== Film comic ==
Shueisha created a film comic adaptation of the film, titled Gekijōban One Piece: Norowareta Seiken (劇場版One Piece ―呪われた聖剣―, meaning One Piece The Movie: The Cursed Holy Sword) (Note: This translation is given in the background of the volumes' table of contents.) and released it in two volumes on July 2, 2004 (ISBN 4-08-873707-5 and ISBN 4-08-873708-3).

First volume chapter list

1. "Asuka-tō" (アスカ島, lit. "Asuka Island")
2. "Uragiri no Zoro!?" (裏切りのゾロ!?, lit. "Zoro's Disappearance!?")
3. "Yōtō: Shichi Seiken" (妖刀・七星剣, lit. "Cursed Sword: The Seven Stars Blade")
4. "Densetsu" (伝説, lit. "Legend")

Second volume chapter list

5. "Sakusen Kaishi!" (作戦開始!, lit. "The Plan Begins!")
6. "Gishiki" (儀式, lit. "Ritual")
7. "Chikara no Kaihō" (力の解放, lit. "Liberation of the Power")
8. "Kenshi" (剣士, lit. "Swordsman")
