= Seiji Sasaki =

Japanese actor and voice actor

- 佐々木誠二
- Born: January 11, 1965 (age 61); Saitama Prefecture, Japan
- Occupations: Actor; voice actor
- Years active: 1990–present
- Agent: Theatre Company Subaru

Seiji Sasaki (佐々木誠二, Sasaki Seiji; born January 11, 1965) is a Japanese actor and voice actor affiliated with Theatre Company Subaru. He often dubs over African-American actors.

== Filmography ==
=== Television animation ===
- Allison & Lillia (Ian)
- Ayakashi: Samurai Horror Tales (Yoshiaki Sakai)
- Black Cat (Gilbar)
- Dragon Ball Kai (Reacoom)
- Hajime no Ippo (Shinoda)
- Fullmetal Alchemist (Sig Curtis)
- Fullmetal Alchemist: Brotherhood (Sig Curtis)
- Initial D series (Atsurō Kawai)
- InuYasha (Kawaramaru)
- Inazuma Eleven (Reiji Kageyama)
- Kaleido Star (Puck)
- Kaizoku Sentai Gokaiger (Stargul)
- One Piece (Blueno, Squard, Mitsuboshi)
- Overman King Gainer (Kizz Munt)
- Pokémon Advanced Generation (Bolt)
- Samurai 7 (Ayamaro)
- Samurai Champloo (Oniwakamaru)
- Shinryaku! Ika Musume (Harris)
- Shinryaku!? Ika Musume (Harris)
- Shaman King (Bunstar)
- Tokumei Sentai Go-Busters (Messiah/Messiah Cell/Parabolaloid 2 (Messiahloid)/Messiah Reboot)

=== Tokusatsu ===
- Kaizoku Sentai Gokaiger (Stargull (ep. 22))
- Tokumei Sentai Go-Busters (Messiah (eps. 1 - 10, 12 - 13, 15 - 20 - 23, 27 - 30, 33, 36, 38 - 40, 42 - 44)/Messiah Cell (ep. 28 - 29)/Parabolaloid 2 (Messiahloid) (ep. 40)/Messiah Reboot (ep. 44))

=== OVA ===
- Hajime no Ippo: Kimura Vs. Mashiba (Shinoda)
- Tekken: The Motion Picture (Bruce Irvin)

=== Theatrical animation ===
- Fullmetal Alchemist the Movie: Conqueror of Shamballa (Sig Curtis)
- Howl's Moving Castle (Port city fish seller)
- Nasu: Summer in Andalusia (Zamenhoff)
- One Piece: The Cursed Holy Sword (Bismark)
- Pokémon Ranger and the Temple of the Sea (Kai, Wailmer, Wailord)
- Sakura Wars: The Movie (Commissioned army officer)

=== Video games ===
- Bladestorm: The Hundred Years' War (Edward III of England)
- Initial D Arcade Stage series (Atsuro Kawai)
- Jak II (The Oracle, Krimson Guard)
- One Piece: Pirates Carnival (Blueno)
- Dragon Ball: Raging Blast 2 (Recoome)

=== Dubbing roles ===
==== Live-action ====
- Alien Resurrection (First Mate Christie (Gary Dourdan))
- Black Nativity (Tyson (Tyrese Gibson))
- Doctor Who (Cyberman)
- Exit Wounds (2004 NTV edition) (Useldinger)
- Live and Let Die (2006 Blu-ray edition) (Tee Hee Johnson (Julius Harris))
- Power Rangers Lost Galaxy (Magna Defender)
- Stargate SG-1 (Teal'c (Christopher Judge))
- Underworld (Kahn the Death Dealer (Robbie Gee))
- The World Is Not Enough (2003 TV Asahi edition) (Charles Robinson (Colin Salmon))

==== Animation ====
- Justice League (Martian Manhunter)
- Spider-Man: The Animated Series (Lonnie Lincoln/Tombstone)
- Teen Titans (Johnny Rancid)
