= Nasu: A Migratory Bird with Suitcase =

2007 original video animation directed by Kitarō Kōsaka

- Genre: Drama; Sports
- Original video animation
- Directed by: Kitarō Kōsaka
- Produced by: Hiroshi Hirayama; Jungo Maruta; Masarou Toyoshima
- Written by: Manga: Iou Kuroda; Screenplay: Kitarō Kōsaka
- Music by: Toshiyuki Honda
- Studio: Madhouse
- Released: 24 October 2007
- Runtime: 54 minutes

Nasu: A Migratory Bird with Suitcase (Japanese: 茄子 スーツケースの渡り鳥, Hepburn: Nasu: Suitcase no Wataridori) is a 2007 OVA by Madhouse, directed by Kitarō Kōsaka and featuring Ken'ichi Yoshida as animation director.

== Development and production ==
It is a sequel to Nasu: Summer in Andalusia. Kōsaka and Yoshida were animation supervisors on Studio Ghibli on numerous titles, including Spirited Away and Princess Mononoke. The Nasu universe is based on the manga Nasu created by Iou Kuroda.

== Reception ==
The film won the best OVA award at the 7th Tokyo Anime Awards, held at the 2008 Tokyo International Anime Fair.
