= Toyoko Inn =

Chain of business hotels in Japan

- Industry: Hotel
- Founded: January 23, 1986
- Founder: Norimasa Nishida
- Headquarters: Kamata, Ōta, Tokyo, Japan
- Number of locations: 269 hotels (as of September 2017)
- Area served: Japan, South Korea, The Philippines (Cebu), Germany (Frankfurt), France (Marseille)
- Key people: Maiko Kuroda
- Revenue: 81.9 billion yen (as of March 2017)
- Number of employees: 10,895 (including part-time employees, as of March 2017)
- Website: www.toyoko-inn.com/eng/

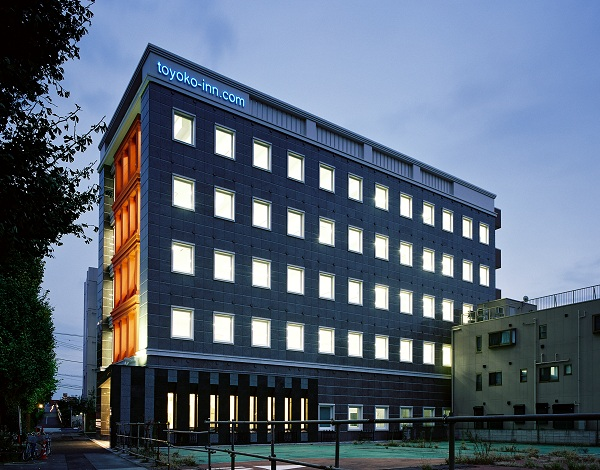
Toyoko Inn headquarters in Kamata

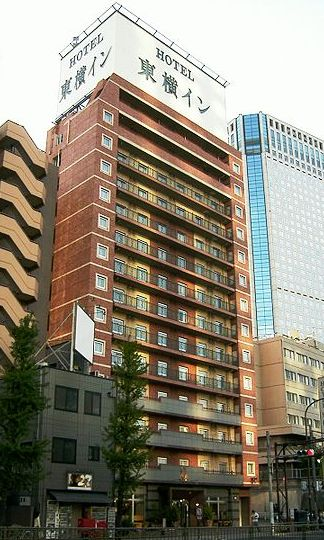
The Toyoko Inn Shinagawa-eki Takanawa-guchi in the Takanawa section of Minato, Tokyo, near Shinagawa Station

Toyoko Inn Co., Ltd. (株式会社東横イン, Kabushiki Gaisha Tōyoko In) is a chain of business hotels in Japan, founded in 1986 and expanding rapidly from the 1990s.

The company is headquartered in the Kamata section of Ōta, Tokyo, about halfway between the central wards of Tokyo and Yokohama; its name is a portmanteau of the names of Tokyo and Yokohama. It aims for uniformity in its hotels, using as many prefabricated and bulk-purchased components as possible to reduce costs. The chain is also known for almost exclusively hiring women: as of 2001, 95% of the company's workforce was female, and nearly all of its hotel managers were married women.

The company has grown rapidly, increasing its number of hotels from 61 in December 2002 to 347 in October 2022, with typical rates (as of July 2019) between 5800 and 9000 yen per night for a single room. Nearly all its hotels are in Japan; the exceptions are 12 hotels in South Korea, as well as one hotel each in the Philippines, Mongolia, France and Germany. Toyoko Inn will open its first location in the United States in March 2027 in Portland, Oregon.
