= Anime Contents Expo =

Anime trade fair in Japan

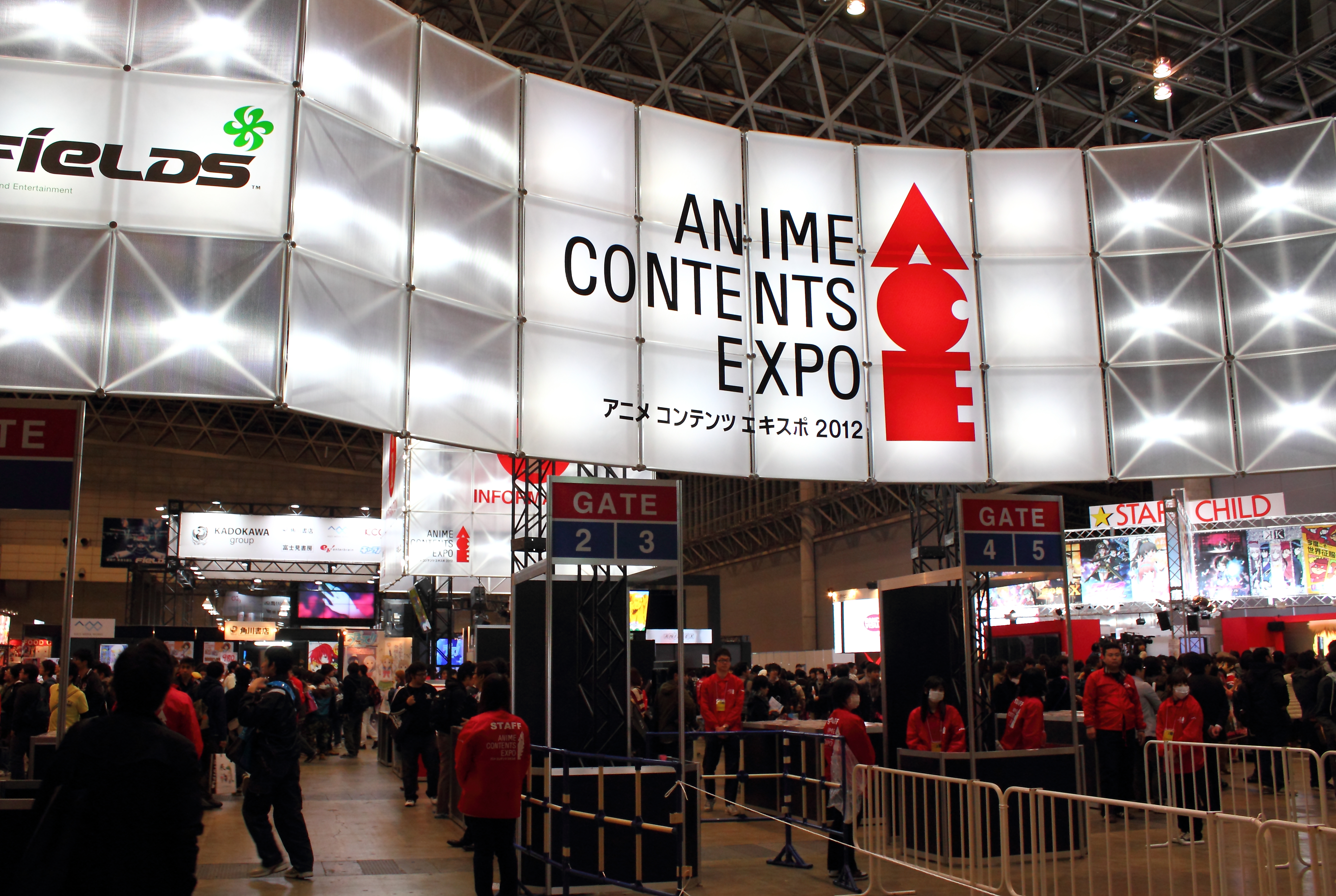
- Anime Contents Expo 2012
- Status: Defunct
- Venue: Makuhari Messe
- Location: Chiba
- Country: Japan
- Inaugurated: 2012
- Most recent: 2013
- Website: animecontentsexpo.jp

The Anime Contents Expo (アニメ コンテンツ エキスポ, Anime Kontentsu Ekisupo), also known as ACE, was one of the largest anime trade fairs in the world, held annually in Japan. The first event was held in 2012. The event was held at Makuhari Messe, a convention and exhibition center in Tokyo Bay, in late March. In 2014 it was merged with the Tokyo International Anime Fair to form AnimeJapan.

== Event history ==
Date	Attendance	Exhibitors	Location
2011	Cancelled due to the 2011 Tōhoku earthquake and tsunami event		
March 31–April 1, 2012			Makuhari Messe, Chiba
March 30–31, 2013			Makuhari Messe, Chiba
