= Shangri-La (novel) =

Japanese light novel

- Cover of the Shangri-La light novel, published by Kadokawa Shoten.

シャングリ·ラ (Shanguri Ra)
- Genre: Science fiction
- Light novel
- Written by: Eiichi Ikegami
- Illustrated by: Ken'ichi Yoshida
- Published by: Kadokawa Shoten
- Magazine: Newtype
- Original run: April 2004 – May 2005
- Volumes: 1 (Tankōbon); 2 (Bunkobon)
- Manga
- Written by: Eiichi Ikegami
- Illustrated by: Tasuku Karasuma
- Published by: Kadokawa Shoten
- Magazine: Ace Assault (former); Shōnen Ace
- Published: January 2009
- Volumes: 4
- Anime television series
- Directed by: Makoto Bessho
- Produced by: Takashi Imamoto; Tsuneo Takechi; Tsutomu Kojima; Yoshifumi Kominato; Yuka Harada
- Written by: Hiroshi Ōnogi
- Music by: Hitomi Kuroishi
- Studio: Gonzo
- Licensed by: Crunchyroll (Note: In North America through Crunchyroll, LLC (formerly known as Funimation) and in Australia through Crunchyroll Store Australia (formerly known as Madman Entertainment).); UK: MVM Films
- Original network: CTC, TV Saitama, KBS, tvk, Sun TV, TVQ, Tokyo MX, TVh, TV Aichi
- English network: US: Funimation Channel
- Original run: April 6, 2009 – September 14, 2009
- Episodes: 24

Shangri-La (Japanese: シャングリ·ラ, Hepburn: Shanguri Ra) is a Japanese science fiction light novel, written by Eiichi Ikegami and illustrated by Ken'ichi Yoshida. The novel was initially serialized in Kadokawa Shoten's Newtype magazine between April 2004 and May 2005. The chapters were collected into a single bound volume on September 23, 2005, and was later re-released in two volumes by Kadokawa both released on October 25, 2008. A manga series adaptation drawn by Tasuku Karasuma started serialization in Kadokawa's Ace Assault in January 2009, but was later transferred to Shōnen Ace. An anime television series, directed by Makoto Bessho, written by Hiroshi Ōnogi and featuring character designs by Range Murata and animation character designs by Kumi Ishii, premiered in Japan on April 6, 2009.

== Plot ==
In the mid-21st century, the international committee decided to forcefully reduce CO_{2} emission levels to mitigate global warming. As a result, the economic market was absorbed predominantly by the trade of carbon. A great earthquake destroys much of Japan, yet the heavy carbon tax placed on the once-industrialized country is not lifted, so Tokyo is turned into the world's largest "jungle-polis" that absorbs carbon dioxide. Project Atlas is commenced to plan the rebuilding of Tokyo and oversee the government organization, which the Metal Age group opposes due to its oppressive nature. However, Atlas is built with enough room for only 3,500,000 people, and most are not allowed to migrate into the city. The disparity between the elite within Atlas and the refugees living in the jungles outside its walls sets up the background of the story.

== Characters ==
=== Main characters ===
Kuniko Hojo (北条 國子, Hōjō Kuniko)
Voiced by: Mikako Takahashi (Japanese); Lindsay Seidel (English)
A young girl who skillfully wields a light-weight boomerang, made from high-carbon steel, in the defense of her town from the military or anyone who seeks to intervene. She is extremely athletic and has a rambunctious personality. Kuniko is affectionately known to the residents of Duomo as Kuni-chan. She is also referred to as The Sun, and Atlas members call her Digma 2. At the start of the series, she is released by Atlas from the women's detention center after a two-year sentence for domestic terrorism, rejoining Momoko, Miiko, and Takehiko while still in her old high-school uniform. Although not part of Metal Age, she is considered the future head of the anti-government organization due to her grandmother's position. She is a clone of Jimmu (Himiko in the anime).
Mikuni (美邦)
Voiced by: Yui Ariga (Japanese); Apphia Yu (English)
A very pale little girl. She suffers from a collagen disease and thus cannot bear sunlight. She has the uncanny ability to see through lies and habitually puts liars to death by some unexplained ability to manipulate and crush the offender's body (in the manga version, the origin of this power is the Mirror of Yata, lodged in one of her eyes). She carries a sacred dagger identical to the ones Kunihito Kusanagi and Kuniko have, as well as an earring matching the one Momoko wears. She is referred to as "The Moon" and also as Digma 1. Strangely, in the manga adaptation, Mikuni's emblem is the three-legged solar crow, Yatagarasu, instead of the Imperial Seal of Japan, a Chrysanthemum Crest stylised as a golden sun like flower (it is also considered as the symbol of the Japanese Civilisation).
Kunihito Kusanagi (草薙 国仁, Kusanagi Kunihito)
Voiced by: Makoto Ishii (Japanese); Austin Tindle (English)
A military officer who works for Atlas Corporation under Leon's lead. He does not want to hurt others as much as the Atlas military does. He carries a sacred dagger identical to Kuniko's and Mikuni's, except that the tip of his dagger is broken. He is a distant descendant of Jimmu (Himiko in the anime). Kunihito is referred to as The Land and as Digma 3.

=== Duomo ===
A city surrounded by deadly jungles where the main characters live. Duomo is home both for citizens and for the headquarters of the Anti-Government organization Metal-Age. It is eventually destroyed during the burning of Tokyo to eradicate the Daedulus.

Momoko (モモコ)
Voiced by: Jōji Nakata (Japanese); Kent Williams (English)
A trans woman with a flamboyant personality. Momoko tends to pick on Miiko but seems to care for Kuniko almost as a daughter. Her weapon of choice is a whip that is coiled around her arm until she activates and uses it. She has a liking towards men, and often attacks them by forcing upon them kisses or other uncomfortable encounters. She is one of the owners of Tropical Fish.
Nagiko Hojo (北条 凪子, Hōjō Nagiko)
Voiced by: Hisako Kyōda (Japanese); Linda Leonard (English)
Kuniko's grandmother, the head of Metal Age. She places a strong emphasis on learning and is much sterner and reserved than Kuniko is. She expects Kuniko to become the next leader of Metal Age though Kuniko does not want to be. She disagrees with using the internet for information, and gets her knowledge from the many books she has. Nagiko is actually the first CEO of Atlas Corporation and received funds from Sergei Talsian in order to build the futuristic city for their descendants. After Kuniko confronts her about this fact and receives no explanation, she is forced to expel her grandmother from Duomo. However, Nagiko reappears later on to help Kuniko to negotiate with Ryoko to grant temporary shelter inside Atlas for the inhabitants on the surface so that Metal Age can eradicate Daedulus by burning Tokyo down.
Yuri Gamagori (蒲郡 由里, Gamagori Yuri)
Voiced by: Sachika Misawa (Japanese); Emerick Jade (English)
Kuniko's friend. A slow-paced girl who always tries to see the bright side of life, often ending up in just not seeing anything at all. Desperately wanting to free herself from her family name, she has a strong wish to be married. She is very interested in boys and dates many guys.
Tomoka Yamazaki (山崎 友香, Yamazaki Tomoka)
Voiced by: Yurie Yamashita (Japanese); Tia Ballard (English)
Kuniko’s friend who goes to all-girls high school, a girl-next-door type with slightly gloomy air. Though she is yielding toward Kuniko, she is not afraid of reproving Yuri. It is revealed later in the series that she had stabbed a citizen two years earlier and that Kuniko had taken the blame to protect her friend. This resulted in Kuniko's two year prison sentence.
Takehiko (武彦)
Voiced by: Ken'yū Horiuchi (Japanese); Bryan Massey (English)
A driver and a rough-and-tumble guy. He regulates the electricity production in the town of Duomo. He often seems reckless but is unfailingly dependable. It is revealed that Takehiko was an agent sent by Atlas to watch over Kuniko, under the code-name #13. He strongly believes in the construction of Atlas, but this belief was shattered when he found out that his younger sister Yasuko was kidnapped by Atlas and used as a sacrifice with other children in the city's construction. Losing all hope, he attempts to kill Kuniko in order to ruin Atlas' plans but is stopped by her and Kunihito. He tells Kuniko her true role as inheritor of Atlas before seemingly killing himself by jumping into a storm drain. He reappears at the ending where he tries to destroy Atlas.

=== Atlas ===
Ryoko Naruse (鳴瀬 涼子, Naruse Ryōko)
Voiced by: Rei Igarashi (Japanese); Jennifer Seman (English)
A domineering and ruthless woman who governs Atlas with an iron fist. She has the habit of lashing out at others, mostly towards Shion, one of her employees whom she treats as a slave. Eventually rising to the position of Japan's Prime Minister, she shows little concern about everyone or everything except her plans and herself. Ryoko is revealed as the human interface of Zeus, the supercomputer that controls Atlas. She is finally killed by Kuniko after her plan to have Himiko possess her body fails.
Soichiro Hata (秦総 一郎, Hata Soichirō)
Voiced by: Daisuke Hirakawa (Japanese); Todd Haberkorn (English)
One of the people working for Ryoko, he looks after information and updates for Lady Ryoko.
Shogo Kudo (九土 省吾, Kudo Shogo)
Voiced by: Takahiro Sakurai (Japanese); J. Michael Tatum (English)
The main analyst for Atlas Corporation, Shogo works for Lady Ryoko.
Reon Imaki (今木 烈音, Imaki Reon)
Voiced by: Yūichi Nakamura (Japanese); Jason Douglas (English)
Working for Lady Ryoko, Reon is the older brother of Shion and leads the military for Atlas Corporation.
Shion Imaki (今木 紫音, Imaki Shion)
Voiced by: Jun Fukuyama (Japanese); Micah Solusod (English)
The younger brother of Reon and one of the workers for Ryoko, his main job is to care for Lady Ryoko's needs, which includes serving food and drying her off after a bath. He is Ryoko's primary abuse victim, and has a severe form of traumatic bonding.

=== Moon Palace ===
Miiko (ミーコ)
Voiced by: Houchu Ohtsuka (Japanese); Randy Pearlman (English)
A younger trans woman. Miiko seems to tend to cry a lot and tends to be picked on by other members of the group. One of the owners of Tropical Fish. The winner of the Atlas Lottery, she is entrusted by Momoko to reopen the Tropical Fish in Atlas, however she is sent to serve Mikuni in the Moon Palace. Two-thirds through the anime storyline, Miiko is forcibly turned into Hiruko's newest vessel, but she is able to fight the lord's personality and temporarily gain control of his body. Sayoko takes her and Mikuni away from Atlas. She sacrifices herself and Hiruko to save Sayoko and Mikuni by shielding them during the bombing of Neo Akihabara presumably using all of Hiruko's power to accomplish this. At the end, she reappears in front of Sayoko and Mikuni to bid Mikuni a final farewell and using some kind of power to cure Mikuni of her disease and deadly ability. She also asks Sayoko to take care of Mikuni like a real mother before disappearing with the souls of the other children who were sacrificed over the years during Atlas' construction. Her birth name is Tetsuo Kumagai (熊谷徹雄, Kumagai Tetsuo).
Sayoko (小夜子)
Voiced by: Rie Ishizuka (Japanese); Anastasia Muñoz (English)
Mikuni's protector. She watches in delight as Mikuni sees through the lies of people and puts them to death. She also experiments on people to her delight and loves to be insulted by them while she does it. At one point, Momoko refers to as a sadist. She tries to end her life to enable Mikuni to become the successor of Atlas but is rescued by Momoko.

=== Ishida Finance ===
Karin Ishida (石田 香凜, Ishida Karin)
Voiced by: Yuka Iguchi (Japanese); Jad Saxton (English)
A little girl who enjoys manipulating the world economy through the carbon-credit market, and one of the creators of MEDUSA. She hides her true face when talking to others through her computer console because she doesn't like people. She possesses a teddy bear (named Pudding) which she does show to the camera and to which she talks as if it were a real person. Pudding "responds" to Karin's comments, though it is actually Karin talking to herself in a funny voice. Her parents actually have died in an air crash, but she is made to believe that they are very busy with work, leaving her alone all the time. Karin buys out the entire Akihabara for her own after getting tired from shopping around. After she tries to hack into Zeus, she is pursued by Atlas authority. She escapes arrest by escaping to Akihabara. As the story progresses, her personality becomes slightly accepting of people as she only hides her eyes with sunglasses when she talks to them. She tries to make Mikuni the successor of Atlas when Mikuni seeks refuge in Akihabara.
Klaris Lutz (クラリス·ルッツ, Kararisu Ruttsu)
Voiced by: Kumiko Watanabe (Japanese); Trina Nishimura (English)
A friend of Karin's who works for Ishida Finance. She loves money, hates being poor, and buys lavish things (including the Ferrari company). She is known only from instant-message conversations with Karin until the ending where she visits Karin. She actually looks more mature than how her instant messages portray her.
Zhang (張, Chan)
Voiced by: Hiroyuki Yoshino (Japanese); Anthony Bowling (English)
Another friend of Karin's. He is believed to be the creator of MEDUSA. He is known only from instant-message conversations with Karin until the ending where he takes a private jet to visit Karin.
Sergei Talsian (セルゲイ·タルシャン, Serugei Tarushan)
Voiced by: Hidetori Nakamura (Japanese); Bill Jenkins (English)
A friend of Karin's, Talsian seems to have a connection to Karin's parents, and doesn't talk during instant-message conversations. Talsian makes a physical appearance from halfway through the series. He is chairman of Atlas Corporation, and apparently knows Ryoko well. It is revealed that Talsian and Nagiko, the first CEO of Atlas, both helped create Atlas for a better future for their descendants. He is placed under arrest by Ryoko under allegations of having assisted an unknowing Karin to shut down Atlas' critical systems.
MEDUSA (メデューサ, Medūsa)
Voiced by: Tetsuya Kakihara (Japanese); Joel McDonald (English)
Having a snakelike image, MEDUSA is a computer program built for Ishida Finance used to find debts around the world in countries whose CO_{2} emissions and carbon credits are not equal. Using these "debts," MEDUSA generates vast amounts of money for Ishida Finance through various manipulations of the carbon market (similar to the stock market). MEDUSA is originally believed to be the only program in the world that can perform these manipulations of carbon credits, but it seems that there are other programs similar to it operating across the globe. MEDUSA is kept securely hidden in the Marshall Islands and is protected by a typhoon created by a weather satellite.

=== Akihabara ===
A group of elderly Otaku brokers who reside in the Black Market of Akihabara.

Old Man Army (軍爺, Gun-jī)
Voiced by: Fumihiko Tachiki (Japanese); R Bruce Elliott (English)
An old man who claimed to come from the Army. He acts like the main leader of the trio. He wears Army clothes and uniforms, acts like a commander, and uses paramilitary jargon, including words like "arch-rival" and "ambush".
Old Man Camera (カメラ爺, Kamera-jī)
Voiced by: Mitsuo Iwata (Japanese); Jerry Russell (English)
An old man with a fetish for taking pictures. He carries a camera around with him all the time, snapping pictures whenever he can get the chance. He refers to historical examples when he talks, and wears camouflage clothes.
Old Man Loli (ロリ爺, Rori-jī)
Voiced by: Chafurin (Japanese); Charlie Campbell (English)
An otaku, the weirdest in the trio. A fan of anime figures, he tends to make weird sound effects when he talks. He also uses hand gestures and facial expressions to explain what he wants to say. He wears girlish clothes, a long green wig, and cat ears, which, when paired with a mustache, provides comical relief for watchers.

=== Others ===
Canary (カナリア, Kanaria)
Voiced by: Miyu Irino (Japanese); Justin Pate (English)
A mysterious boy in his teens who first appears to Karin and persuades her to leave her office and go outside. His intentions are to let Karin remember the world outside and the lullaby her mother sang to her when she was an infant. After accomplishing this goal, he disappears. It is revealed that the boy is codenamed Canary (with no real name) and was called Digma Zero, a prototype to the other Digmas (Mikuni, Kuniko and Kunihito). However he was never allowed to step into the world outside, having lived his whole life inside a facility, and died five years before the start of the series, living on as a spirit or ghost. In his profile, his appearance is that of a long-haired blond youth in a white jumpsuit, and he keeps a black cat (which is presumably deceased as well) with a yellow bow tied around its neck as a pet.
Hiruko/Lord of Atlas (水蛭子, Hiruko)
Voiced by: Tomoko Kaneda (Japanese); Heather Walker (English)
A young boy whom Ryoko refers to as the Lord of Atlas, the highest authority in the city. He is partially covered in scrolls, with a strange glow in his left eye. Hiruko resides in his throne room deep below Atlas, with hundreds of eerie-looking eyes decorating the walls. He appears to be immortal, however his method of attaining it comes at a price: the body he uses often breaks down after a short while, requiring the use of new vessels to maintain his spirit before it dissipates permanently. The unwilling vessel is pushed into a pool, and floating talismans partially cover the body. After a while, the memories and personality of the original body will be destroyed, and Hiruko's spirit will take the place of the vessel, changing the body's appearance to his original self. According to Ryoko, Hiruko made a prediction twelve generations ago, that the Sun and Moon (Kuniko and Mikuni) will meet and, as the children of God, the pair will bring harmony to the world. While predicting the prophecy, he often goes into hysterical fits. Sayoko reveals that Hiruko was used by Talsian to control the oscillation of the spiritual forces around Atlas and, once removed from his abode, the area around Atlas will start to destabilize. After Miiko is made his next vessel, Miiko is able to suppress his personality and even take control of his body temporarily. Sayoko takes Hiruko/Miiko away with Mikuni in tow and escape Atlas.

== Locations ==
Atlas
A tower filling the horizon, Atlas is a project promoted by the Japanese Government and run by Atlas Corporation. This tower was built to relocate the rich and privileged, away from the Jungle-polis covering much of Japan. However, the government had lied to the citizens, promising everyone a place on Atlas once the construction finishes. The only citizens allowed in Atlas are winners of a famous "Atlas Lottery".
Duomo
The city from which Kuniko hails. Surrounded by old ruins of Tokyo now overgrown with much vegetation, the city is colorful and vibrant but very ramshackle. It is the home to the Metal Age group. The people of the Metal Age group seem to put more of a focus on nature and learning than on industry and military might.
Ikebukuro
Now a forbidden forest surrounding Duomo, this jungle can be reached by an old abandoned railway track. Ikebukuro is filled with dense oxygen and poisonous swampland, and can not be entered safely without wearing protective gear and air masks to protect the skin and lungs.
Akihabara
The "Market" City, Akihabara is famous for its "Black Markets" and is filled with people from different cities who operate the many businesses there. This is where Kuniko decides to sell Graphite and the home of the three old otaku who make the fake IDs which Metal Age uses to enter Atlas.

== Media ==
=== Light novel ===
Shangri-La began as a light novel which was initially serialized in Kadokawa Shoten's Newtype magazine between the April 2004 and May 2005 issues. A single 592-page volume was released on September 22, 2005. The novel was re-released in two bunkobon volumes both released on October 25, 2008.

=== Manga ===
A manga adaptation illustrated by Karasuma Tasuku began serialization in Kadokawa Shoten's Ace Assault magazine in January 2009. After that magazine was discontinued in March 2009, the manga was transferred over to Kadokawa's Shōnen Ace magazine. The first bound volume was released on November 21, 2008, followed by the fourth on February 23, 2010.

=== Anime ===
An anime adaptation of the novel was produced by the animation studio Gonzo, and was the first Newtype work to be animated for television. The series was directed by Makoto Bessho, written by Hiroshi Ōnogi, and featured character designs by Range Murata. The series premiered on April 6, 2009, on Chiba TV. The first DVD compilation volume was released by Kadokawa Entertainment on July 24, 2009. The Internet streaming media service Crunchyroll also aired the series on simulcast with episodes airing one hour after they were released in Japan. The series made its North American television debut on April 1, 2013, on the Funimation Channel.

The anime has three pieces of theme music: one opening theme and two ending themes. The opening theme is "Kimi Shinitamō Koto Nakare" (キミシニタモウコトナカレ) by May'n. The first ending theme is "Hajimari no Asa ni Hikari Are." (はじまりの朝に光あれ.) by Midori, and the second ending theme is "Tsuki ni Kakuseshi Chō no Yume" (月に隠せし蝶の夢) by Hitomi.

== Reception ==
Allen Moody of THEM Anime Reviews said that it reminds him of "other dystopian-future anime series" like The Skull Man. He also mentioned Momoko, a trans woman who used to own a drag club saying that even though the show doesn't always treat her respectfully, she is a "sympathetic and an admirable character." He concluded by saying that he wished that the show had "stuck with fewer plot points...[and] developed them with greater depth" and that the show is an epic, but overly complicated, as he could never "figure some of the choices the characters made" and noted that the show is not for younger viewers due to its violence.
