= Kitarō Kōsaka =

Japanese animator and film director (born 1962)

- 高坂 希太郎
- Born: February 28, 1962 (age 64); Kanagawa Prefecture, Japan
- Occupations: Animator, film director
- Years active: 1979–present
- Known for: Nasu: Summer in Andalusia

Kitarō Kōsaka (高坂 希太郎, Kōsaka Kitarō; born February 28, 1962 in Kanagawa Prefecture) is a Japanese animator and film director.

== Profile ==
He began his career in 1979 with the studio Oh! Production. He left the studio in 1986 to become a freelance, and soon went on to work on numerous projects as a key and supervising animation director for the noted animation studio Studio Ghibli, and with the famed director Hayao Miyazaki, of whose work he is himself an acknowledged fan.

In 2003, he directed the cycling anime film, Nasu: Summer in Andalusia, set on the Vuelta a España road bicycle race, adapted from Iou Kuroda's manga series Nasu, which Hayao Miyazaki, a fan of cycling, himself recommended to Kōsaka. The film soon went on to become the first Japanese anime film ever to be selected for the Cannes Film Festival.

He has worked on numerous other projects for the studio Madhouse, including adaptations of manga artist Naoki Urasawa's works with the studio, including Yawara, Master Keaton and Monster, and adaptations of two of Clamp's works, including Clover and Double X, both of them being short films.

== Works ==
- 1982 - Minami no Niji no Lucy (key animation)
- 1982 - Jarinko Chie (key and in-between animation)
- 1983 - Mīmu Iro Iro Yume no Tabi (key animation)
- 1984 - Lupin III: Part III (key animation)
- 1984 - Nausicaä of the Valley of the Wind (key animation)
- 1985 - Kamui no Ken (key animation)
- 1985 - Meitantei Holmes (animation director)
- 1985 - Lupin III: Legend of the Gold of Babylon (key animation)
- 1985 - Angel's Egg (key animation)
- 1986 - Castle in the Sky (key animation)
- 1987 - Royal Space Force: The Wings of Honneamise (key animation)
- 1987 - Twilight Q (key animation)
- 1988 - Grave of the Fireflies (key animation)
- 1988 - Akira (key animation)
- 1988 - Kaze wo Nuke! (key animation)
- 1989 - Yawara! A Fashionable Judo Girl (storyboards, episode director, animation director, key animation)
- 1993 - A-Girl (director, character design, animation director)
- 1993 - Double X (key animation)
- 1994 - Pom Poko (key animation)
- 1995 - Whisper of the Heart (animation director)
- 1997 - Princess Mononoke (supervising animation director)
- 1998 - Master Keaton (character design, animation director, layout supervisor, storyboards, etc.)
- 1999 - Clover (director)
- 2001 - Spirited Away (supervising animation director)
- 2001 - Metropolis (key animation)
- 2003 - Nasu: Summer in Andalusia (director, screenplay, character design, animation director)
- 2004 - Monster (original character designs)
- 2005 - Howl's Moving Castle (supervising animation director)
- 2007 - Nasu: A Migratory Bird with Suitcase (director)
- 2008 - Ponyo on the Cliff by the Sea (supervising animation director)
- 2010 - Mr. Dough and the Egg Princess (animation director)
- 2011 - From up on Poppy Hill (animation director)
- 2013 - The Wind Rises (character design, animation director)
- 2018 - Okko's Inn (director and character design)

== Sources ==
- 高坂 希太郎 (Kitarō Kōsaka) at the Japanese Movie Database (in Japanese)
- Kitarō Kōsaka at Anime News Network's encyclopedia
