= Maiko Kuroda =

- 黒田 麻衣子
- Born: 1976 (age 49–50); Tokyo, Japan
- Education: Master
- Alma mater: Rikkyo University, University of the Sacred Heart
- Occupations: President, Executive Officer
- Years active: 2008-
- Organization: Toyoko Inn
- Known for: President of Toyoko Inn
- Parent: Norimasa Nishida
- Awards: Japan Woman Award, Avon Woman Prize, Mainichi Keizainin Prize

Maiko Kuroda (黒田 麻衣子, Kuroda Maiko; née Nishida, born 1976-) is a Japanese entrepreneur who served as a president of Toyoko Inn, and the daughter of its founder, Norimasa Nishida. Following her father's resignation in 2006, Kuroda was the vice-president of Toyoko from 2008 to 2012, and has served as its president since 2012. During her term as president, Toyoko has recovered from a management crisis and become one of the largest hotels in Japan.

== Biography ==
=== Early life ===
Burn in 1976 in Tokyo, Kuroda is the daughter of Norimasa Nishida, founder of Toyoko Inn, with sisters. During her childhood, Nishida often came home late. And even at home, he constantly talked about his career and yelled at his employee over the phone. As a result, Kuroda had no interest in her father's career (i.e. hotel management), and wished to become a teacher or a housewife instead.

Kuroda studied at a girls' high school and became a member of its student council, which was appointed by teachers. She was therefore faced with backlash from students. In an interview, she mentioned the experience had affected her management style in later days. After graduating from high school, she studied at the University of the Sacred Heart, and Rikkyo University in her master's degree. Her major was the contemporary history of Germany. Kuroda began teaching history at her high school as part of her working experience during her university, but later abandoned her teaching career when she realised that she was not suited for the role. She later graduated from Rikkyo, but cannot attend job hunting activities because she was writing her thesis at the time.

Engaged in April 2002, Kuroda worked in Toyoko at the time, and served at the marketing department (営業企画部) at a newly opened branch. Kuroda had her daughters in 2003 and 2005, and therefore quitted from Toyoko in 2004, and later went to Germany with her husband and became{Clarify|became?} housewife in 2005. At the time, the proportion of working women in Japan has just caught up with that of housewives. Seeing more of her friends become working women, Kuroda, who did not want to be an idle homemaker, started consider returning to the workforce, and planned to start a business while raising her daughter.

=== President of Toyoko Inn ===
Toyoko Inn had faced numbers of incidents after a a serious of building violations in 2006, and had become a serious crisis when 2008 financial crisis was taken place. The company tried to address it by reducing accommodation fees and cutting staff, but did not improve its performance. Norimasa Nishida, the president of Toyoko at the time, resigned in 2006. Seeing his father's resignation, Kuroda decided to manage Toyoko to save the company.

In 2008, Kuroda became the vice president of Toyoko. (Note: Kuroda decided to observe the situation for three years because of her lack of working experience.) At vice president, Kuroda's main role was to communicate between her father and other managers, due to her father's arbitrary management style. And after communicating with grassroots-level managers, she found that the morale's falling was because of depressing performance instead of apathetic staff. Therefore, Kuroda decided to retain the policies of "Managers managing hotels" and "emphasis on female staff" (Note: In 2020, almost 97% managers of Toyoko are female. In an interview, Kuroda commented that promoting female managers has been the policy since the foundation. She stated that the reason lies in women's meticulousness and attention to detail. However, she also expressed the hope that the proportion of male managers could be increased.) and reforming the company based on these policies.

In June 2012, Kuroda became the president of Toyoko, with the slogan of "The most rewarding workplace for women in Japan" (Note: Japanese: 日本一女性が働きがいのある職場). She changed the hotel's personnel structure during her term as president, such as encouraging individuals without working experience in the accommodation industry to join managers directly, (Note: For instance, Kuroda hired a proprietress of a Japanese restaurant as a hotel manager.) focuses on interpersonal skills, and emphasises personal preference when hiring managers. She also established a committee for hotel managers. In addition to creating a communication network among managers, the committee also aims to prevent the problem where no one dares to question company policy in the time of Nishida and bring questions to light.

Following the revive from the aftermath of the 2011 Tōhoku earthquake and tsunami in 2012, Toyoko has become better under the reviving trend. In May 2015, all Toyoko hotels were full during the golden week, which won the "Largest hotel chain with a 100% occupancy" of Guinness World Records. In 2016, Kuroda expressed her wish of expanding the rooms to 500 thousands from 50 thousands in 30 years, and eventually 10.45 million rooms. (Note: In Japanese, "1045" can be pronounced as Toyogo (とよご) by Kun'yomi, which is closed to how "Toyoko" is pronounced.) Almost 60,000 rooms in 301 Toyoko hotels were offered in August 2019, making it become one of the largest hotels in Japan.

== Awards ==
Awards Maiko Kuroda won
Year	Award	Department	Reference
2016	Japan Woman Award	Leader Development Division Grand Prix (Note: リーダー輩出部門 グランプリ)	
2018	Avon Woman Prize	Education Prize	
2020	Mainichi Keizainin Prize	N/A	

== Publications ==
- 黒田麻衣子 (June 2015). 日本一女性が働きたい職場を目指して (in Japanese). たのやく出版.
