= Akinobu Kuroda =

Japanese historian

Akinobu Kuroda (黑田明伸) is professor of East Asian history in the Institute for Advanced Studies on Asia, University of Tokyo. He specialises in the complementarity of monies in East Asia, India, Africa, and Europe.

== Career ==
Kuroda studied at Kyoto University (BA, 1980, MA 1982, PhD Oriental history 1985. PhD economics 1995). Kuroda was a visiting scholar at Harvard-Yanching Institute, 2014–2015. He was the editor of the International Journal of Asian Studies for fourteen years until 2018. He has been the recipient of several research grants, including:

- International Collaborative Research on the Variety of Exchange and Multiplicity of Money in Global History (世界史における交換の多様性と貨幣の多元性についての国際共同研究), Japan Society for the Promotion of Science (学術振興会)
- International Cooperative Research on the Multiplicity of Money: Division of Labour among Monies and its Comparison in the World History (貨幣の多元性についての国際共同研究：世界史における貨幣間分業とその比較), Japan Society for the Promotion of Science (学術振興会)
- Money as Social Circuit: Interdisciplinary Research on the Complementarity between Anonymous Currency and Named Credit (社会的回路としての貨幣：匿名的通貨と指名的信用の相互補完性についての学際的研究), Toyota Foundation (トヨタ財団研究助成)
- International Cooperative Research on the Complementarity among Monies Caused by Temporality, Seasonality, and Locality in Making Transactions (取引の一時性・季節性そして空間性がもたらす貨幣間の補完性についての国際共同研究), Japan Society for the Promotion of Science (学術振興会)
- Asymmetric Monies: Revisiting Global Monetary History from the Viewpoints of Complementarity and Viscosity (非対称な貨幣たち-補完性と粘性からみた貨幣の世界史), University of Tokyo Symposium Grant in Aid, (東京大学シンポ助成)
- Study on the Non-Uniformity and the Complementarity of Monetary Circulation in the World History: Searching for the Possibility of Autonomous and Concurrent Monetary System (世界史にみる貨幣流通の非均質性、補完性についての研究――自律的で共存的な貨幣システムの可能性を探る), Toyota Foundation (トヨタ財団研究助成)
- Unique Characteristics and Synchronicity of Currencies in Medieval and Early Modern East Asia and their Implications in the Theory of Money (中近世東アジア貨幣史の特殊性・共時性とその貨幣論的含意), Japanese Ministry of Education, Science and Technology (文部科学省 特定研究（東アジア海域）)
- Comparative Historical Study of Foreign Currencies Circulation in Modern Asian and Africa (近代アジア・アフリカにおける外国通貨流通の比較史的研究), The Japan Society for the Promotion of Science (学術振興会)
- Comparative Historical Study of Trade Silver Dollars Circulation in Asia and Africa and Their Demises (アジア・アフリカにおける貿易銀流通とその終焉についての比較史的研究), Japan Society for the Promotion of Science (学術振興会)
- Comparison between India and China in the Modern World System Centred around Money and Finance (貨幣・金融を中心とする近代世界システムにおけるインドと中国の比較), Japanese Ministry of Education (文部省 特定（南アジア）)

== Awards ==
- 1994 16th Suntory Academic Prize for Political and Economic Sciences, awarded by the Suntory Foundation, for Chuka teikoku no kozo to sekai keizai (中華帝国の構造と世界経済, The Structure of the Chinese Empire and the World Economy) , 1994

== Selected publications ==
Books

- 2020 A Global History of Money, Routledge, Abingdon and New York.
- 2020 Kahei sisutemu no sekaishi: hi-taishosei o yomu (貨幣システムの世界史-「非対称性」をよむ, World History of Monetary Systems: Interpreting the Asymmetric Phenomenon), Iwanami 岩波, Tokyo, 2003; 増補新版 supplemented version 2014; 岩波現代文庫版 Iwanami Contemporary Libraries version 2020. (Translated into Chinese : 货币制度的世界史-解释非对称性 translated by HE Ping 何平, China's People UP, Beijing, 2007; translated into Korean, 화폐시스템의세계사 ‘비ㄷ대칭성을읽는다’ translated by CHUNG Hye-jung 鄭恵仲, Nonhyung, Seoul, 2005).
- 1994 Chuka teikoku no kozo to sekai keizai (中華帝国の構造と世界経済, The Structure of the Chinese Empire and the World Economy) Nagoya U.P., Nagoya.

Articles and Book Chapters

- 2020 中国货币史上的用银转变──切片、秤重、入帐的白银 中国经济史研究, 2020–1, 17-26 [Changes in usage of silver in Chinese monetary history - cut, weighed, recorded] (in Chinese)
- 2018 'Famine of Cash: Why Have Local Monies Remained Popular throughout Human History?' in Georgina Gomez ed. Monetary Plurality in Local, Regional and Global Economies, Routledge, London, 114-122.
- 2018 ‘Strategic Peasant and Autonomous Local Market: Revisiting the Rural Economy in Modern China’ International Journal of Asian Studies 15–2, 195–227. doi:10.1017/S1479591418000049
- 2017 ‘Silvers Cut, Weighed, and Booked: Silver Usage in Chinese Monetary History 銀子切片、秤重及記錄在冊——銀在中國錢幣史上的使用’, The Silver Age: Origins and Trade of Chinese Export Silver 白銀時代——中國外銷銀器之來歷與貿易, Hong Kong Maritime Museum, pp. 109–121.
- 2017 歐亞白銀重探──錢幣學上的新發現 澳門研究 87，pp. 150– 161, 2017(4).
- 2017 ‘Why and How Did Silver Dominate across Eurasia Late-13th through Mid-14th Century? : Historical Backgrounds of the Silver Bars Unearthed from Orheiul Vechi’, Tyragetia XI {XXVI} (1). Archaeology, pp. 23–34.
- 2014 'Yui suzu shikan: naze seisen wo kyokyu shitsudukerarenakattanoka (唯‘錫’史観－なぜ精銭を供給 しつづけられなかったのか, Tin Dependence Historiography: Why Could not Medieval Japan Continue Good Coin Supply?)' in K.Iinuma, Hirao Y. and S. Murai eds Daikokai jidai no nihon to kinzoku koeki Metal Trades in Japan of the Great Navigation Era (大航海時代の日本と金属交易), Shibunkaku shuppan (思文閣出版), Kyoto, 2014, pp. 18–20.
- 2013 ‘Anonymous Currencies or Named Debts?: Comparison of Currencies, Local Credits and Units of Account between China, Japan and England in the Pre-industrial Era’, Socio Economic Review 11–1, pp. 57–80. doi:10.1093/ser/mws013
- 2013 ‘What was Silver Tael System? : A Mistake of China as Silver ‘Standard’ Country’, Moneta 160, pp. 391–397.
- 2009 ‘The Eurasian Silver Century, 1276-1359: Commensurability and Multiplicity’, Journal of Global History 4–2, pp. 245–269, 2009. [欧亚大陆的白银时代; Ouyadalu de baiyin shidai (1276-1359), translated by Gao Congming 高聪明, 思想战线; Sixiang zhanxian THINKING 38–6, pp. 79–85, 2012]
- 2008 ‘What is the Complementarity among Monies? An Introductory Note’, Financial History Review 15–1, pp. 7–15, 2008.
- 2008 ‘Concurrent but Non-integrable Currency Circuits: Complementary Relationship among monies in Modern China and other Regions’, Financial History Review 15-1 pp. 17–36.
- 2007 ‘The Maria Theresa Dollar in the Early Twentieth-century Red Sea Region: A Complementary Interface between Multiple Markets’, Financial History Review 14-1 pp. 89–110.
- 2008 ‘Locating Chinese Monetary History in Global and Theoretical Contexts: From Multiple and Complementary Viewpoints’, in Huang Kuanzhong ed. 基調與變奏: 七至二十世紀的中國; Jidiao yu bianzou: 7 zhi 20 shiji de Zhongguo (Keynote and Variations: China from 7th century to 20th century) 2, Chengchi U. Dept of History, Taipei, pp. 33–50.
- 2005 ‘The Collapse of the Chinese Imperial Monetary System’ in K. Sugihara ed. Japan, China and the Growth of the Asian International Economy, 1850-1949, Oxford U.P., pp. 103–126.
- 2005 ‘Copper-Coins Chosen and Silver Differentiated – Another Aspect of ‘Silver Century’ in East Asia’, Acta Asiatica 88, pp. 65–86.
- 2003 ‘What can Prices Tell us about the 16th-18th Century China? - A Review of “Shindai Chugoku no bukka to keizai hendo (Prices and Economic Change in Qing China)” by Kishimoto Mio’, Chugokushigaku (中国史学, Studies in Chinese History) 13, pp. 101–117.
- 2002 ‘What Did the Silver Influx Really Do to Early Modern Asia?’ in Chugoku no rekishi sekai (中国の歴史世界, Historical World of China), Tokyo Metropolitan UP, Tokyo, pp. 403–11.
- 2000 ‘Another Monetary Economy: The Case of Traditional China’, in A.J.H. Latham and H. Kawakatsu eds. Asia Pacific Dynamism 1550-2000, Routledge, London, pp. 187–19.

Articles and Book Chapters in Japanese

- 2008 'Ajia Afurika shihatsu no kahei keizai ron (アジア・アフリカ史発の貨幣経済論, A Theory of Monetary Economy from the Viewpoints of Asian and African History)', in H. Imanishi ed. Sekai shisutemu to higashi Ajia (世界システムと東アジア, The World System and East Asia), Nihon keizai hyoron (日本経済評論, Japanese Economy Forum), Tokyo, pp. 28–44.
- 2007 'Higashi Ajia kaheishi no naka no chusei koki Nihon (東アジア貨幣史の中の中世後期日本, Late Medieval Japanese History in the East Asian Monetary Perspective)', in K. Suzuki ed. Kahei no chiikishi (貨幣の地域史, Regional History of Money), Iwanami 岩波, Tokyo, pp. 7–42.
- 1999 'Kahei ga kataru sho-shisutemu no kobo (貨幣が語る諸システムの興亡, Rise and Fall of Monetary Systems in the World History)', in Iwanami Koza sekai rekishi (岩波講座世界歴史, Lexicon of World History) 15, Iwanami 岩波, Tokyo, pp. 263–285, 1999.
- 1998 'Dento shijo no jusosei to seidoteki wakugumi; Chugoku, Indo, Seio no hikaku (伝統市場の重層性と制度的枠組み——中国･インド･西欧の比較, Multiplicity of Traditional Markets and their Institutional Frameworks: Comparison between China, India and Western Europe)', Shakai-keizai shigaku (社会経済史学, Socio-Economic History) 64–2, pp. 115–138.
- 1998 '16-7seiki kan-Shinakai keizai to senka ryutsu (16・7 世紀環シナ海経済と銭貨流通, Pan China Sea Economy and Coin Circulation in the Sixteenth and Seventeenth Centuries)', Rekishigaku kenkyu (歴史学研究, Journal of Historical Studies) 711, pp. 2–15.
- 1996 '20 seiki shoki taigen-ken ni miru chiiki keizai no genki (二〇世紀初期太原県にみる地域経済の原基, Basic Structure of Regional Economy in Traditional China: The Case of Taiyuan County in the Early Twentieth Century)', Toyoshi kenkyu (東洋史研究, Journal of Oriental Researches) 54–4, pp. 103–136.
- 1995 'Ajia zairai kinyu kara mita 20seiki shoki no sekai keizai (アジア在来金融からみた20世紀初期の世界経済, World Economy in the Early Twentieth Century Viewed from the Indigenous Financial System in Asia)', Rekishi hyoron (歴史評論, Historical Review) 539, pp. 76–91.
- 1994 'Shuhen kara mita kokusai kin honisei no tokushitsu – Chugoku boeki o hikaku kijun to shite (「周辺」からみた国際金本位制の特質―中国貿易を比較基準として, The Characteristic of the International Gold Standard System from the View of the Periphery and in Comparison with the China Trade)', in Satoru Nakamura ed. Higashi Ajia shihonshugi no keisei – Hikakushi no shiten kara (東アジア資本主義の形成―比較史の視点から, Formation of East Asian Capitalism: From the Viewpoint of Comparative History), Aoki 青木, Tokyo, pp. 129–160.
- 1991 'Chugoku kindai ni okeru menshi menka shijo no tokushitsu (中国近代における綿糸棉花市場の特質, The Characteristics of the Cotton-Yarn and Raw-Cotton Market in Modern China)', Rekishigaku kenkyu (歴史学研究, Journal of Historical Studies) 624, pp. 1–17.
- 1991 'Shindai ginsen nikasei no kozo to sono hokai (清代銀銭二貨制の構造とその崩壊, The Structure of the Silver-Cash Monetary System in the Qing and its Collapse)', Shakai-keizai shigaku (社会経済史学, Socio-Economic History) 57–2, pp. 93–125.
- 1988 'Shindai bichiku ko – shisan keitai yori mita keizai kozo ron (清代備蓄考―資産形態よりみた経済構造論―, Study of the Granary System in the Qing Period: A Interpretation of Economic Structure from Assets Formation)', Shirin (史林, History Journal) 1–6, pp. 1–33, 1988.
- 1987 'Kenryu no senki (乾隆の銭貴, The Appreciation of Copper Coins in the Qianlong Era)', Toyoshi kenkyu (東洋史研究, Journal of Oriental Studies) 45–4, pp. 58–89.
- 1986 '20seikishoki Yosuko chukaryuiki no kahei ryutsu (２０世紀初期揚子江中下流域の貨幣流通, Monetary Circulation in the Early Twentieth-Century Middle-Lower Yangzi Region), in Sakae Tsunoyma ed., Nihon ryoji hokoku no kenkyu (日本領事報告の研究, Studies of Japanese Consular Reports) Dobunkan 同文館, Tokyo, pp. 385–414.
- 1985 'Kenryokuteki kaikaku no kozo to sono haikei – Shingai kakumei no keizaishiteki ichi (権力的改革の構造とその背景―辛亥革命の経済史的位置―, Structure of Authoritarian Reformations and its Historical Background: Placing the 1911 Revolution in the Economic-History Perspective)', Rekishigaku kenkyu (歴史学研究, Journal of History Studies) 547, pp. 141–150.
- 1984 'Kindai Chugoku ni okeru kenryokuteki kaikaku no sai kento (近代中国における権力的改革の再検討, Revisiting Authoritarian Reformations in Modern China)', Rekishi hyoron (歴史評論, History Review) 412, pp. 40–51.
- 1983 'Shinmatsu Kohoku-sho zaisei no bukenteki tenkai – Shingai kakumei no zaiseishiteki zentei (清末湖北省財政の分権的展開―辛亥革命の財政史的前提―, Independency of the Hubei Provincial Government in Late Qing Period: Financial Prelude to the 1911 Revolution)', Shirin (史林, History Journal) 66-6, pp. 1–35.
- 1982 'Shinmatsu Kohoku-sho ni okeru heisei kaikaku – Keizai sochi to shite no sho kenryoku (清末湖北省に於ける幣制改革―経済装置としての省権力―, Monetary Reforms in Hubei Province in the Late Qing Period: Provincial Power as an Economic Apparatus)', Toyoshi kenkyu (東洋史研究, Journal of Oriental History Studies) 41–3, pp. 86–122.
