= Kenichi Yoshida (animator) =

Japanese animator and illustrator (born 1969)

Kenichi Yoshida 吉田 健一
- Born: November 23, 1969 (age 56); Kumamoto Prefecture, Japan
- Education: Tokyo Designer Gakuin College
- Occupations: Animator, illustrator
- Years active: 1990–present
- Website: gallo44

Kenichi Yoshida (吉田 健一, Yoshida Ken'ichi; born November 23, 1969 in Kumamoto Prefecture) is a Japanese animator and illustrator. He is a graduate of Tokyo Designer Gakuin College. He is a member of Japan Animation Creators Association (JAniCA).

== Biography ==
Upon joining Studio Ghibli in 1990, Yoshida worked on Only Yesterday and Porco Rosso. In 1999, he left Studio Ghibli to become freelance. Currently, he is focusing on working on Sunrise and Bones works. He is good friends with fellow animator Akira Yasuda (Akiman) and has collaborated with him in numerous productions.

In 2005, he was awarded the individual prize in the 10th Animation Kobe awards. In 2006 at the Tokyo International Anime Fair, he was given the character design award for his work in Eureka Seven.

== Works ==
=== Anime television ===
- Neon Genesis Evangelion (1995–1996; key animation, episode 1) — uncredited.
- Turn A Gundam (1999–2000; key animation, episodes 33, 37, 40, 45, 48, 50)
- Overman King Gainer (2002-2003; character design, mechanical design, animation director, episodes 1, 2, 14, 22, 26; key animation, OP, ED, episodes 11, 13, 19)
- Scrapped Princess (2003; key animation, episode 15)
- Wolf's Rain (2003; animation director, 26; key animation, episode 24)
- Planetes (2003–2004; ED animation; key animation, episodes 1, 7, 26)
- Kenran Butōsai: The Mars Daybreak (2004; OP key animation)
- Kurau Phantom Memory (2004; OP key animation)
- Eureka Seven (2005–2006; character design; main animator; ED 4 storyboards, director, animation; animation director, OP1, OP2, OP4, ED2, episodes 1, 26, 43, 44, 45; key animation, episodes 1, 9, 11, 12, 19, 26, 28, 33, 42, 43, 45, 46, 48, 50)
- Tenpō Ibun Ayakashi Ayashi (2006–2007; OP 2 key animation)
- Dennō Coil (2007; key animation, ending segment, episode 26)
- Gundam Reconguista in G (2014; character design, animation director, chief animator, key animation)
- The Orbital Children (2022; character design)
- Jaadugar: A Witch in Mongolia (2026; character design)

=== OVA ===
- Giant Robo: The Animation - The Day the Earth Stood Still (1992–1998; key animation, episode 2)
- Gunsmith Cats (1995–1996; key animation, episode 2)
- Master Keaton (1998; animation director, episode 30)
- Top wo Nerae 2! (2004–2006; key animation, episode 6)
- Nasu: A Migratory Bird with Suitcase (2007; animation director)

=== Web anime ===
- Xam'd: Lost Memories (2008; key animation, OP)

=== Films ===
- Only Yesterday (1991; in-between animation)
- Porco Rosso (1992; key animation)
- I Can Hear the Sea (1993; key animation)
- Pom Poko (1994; key animation)
- Whisper of the Heart (1995; key animation)
- On Your Mark (1995; key animation)
- Princess Mononoke (1997; key animation)
- Spriggan (1998; key animation)
- My Neighbors the Yamadas (1999; key animation)
- Cowboy Bebop: Knockin' on Heaven's Door (2001; assistant animation director, key animation)
- Psalms of Planets Eureka Seven: Pocketful of Rainbows (2009; character design)
- Tengen Toppa Gurren-Lagann: Chapter Lagann (2009; key animation)

=== Games ===
- Mobile Suit Gundam: Char's Counterattack (1998; OP key animation)
- Arc Rise Fantasia (2009; original main character designs)
- Eureka Seven Vol. 1: The New Wave (2005; original main character designs)
- Eureka Seven Vol. 2: The New Vision (2006; original main character designs)

=== Others ===
- edge - a collection of paintings (2004; illustrations)
- Shangri-La (2004–2005; illustrations)
- Kozue Takada's CD single Himitsu Kichi (2005; jacket illustrations)
