= Tokyo International Anime Fair =

Trade fair in Tokyo, Japan

Coordinates: 35°37′50″N 139°47′42″E

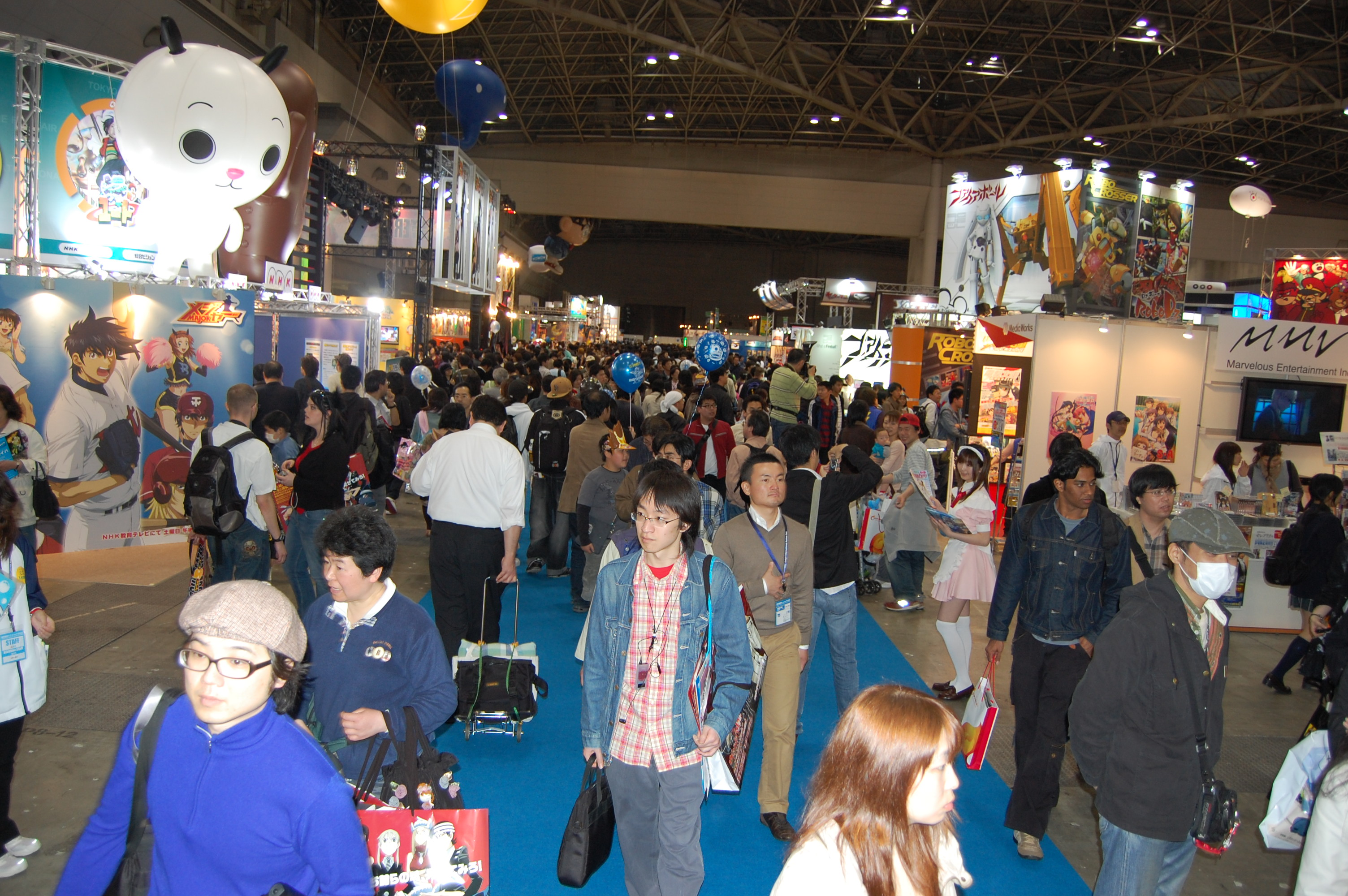
- One of the exhibition halls at the 2008 fair.
- Status: Defunct
- Venue: Tokyo Big Sight
- Location: Tokyo
- Country: Japan
- Inaugurated: 2002
- Most recent: 2013
- Attendance: 105,855 (2013)
- Website: tokyoanime.jp

The Tokyo International Anime Fair also known as Tokyo International Animation Fair (東京国際アニメフェア; TAF) was one of the largest anime trade fairs in the world, held annually in Tokyo, Japan. The first event was held in 2002 as "Tokyo International Anime Fair 21". The event was held at Tokyo Big Sight, a convention and exhibition center in Tokyo Bay, in late March. Usually, the first one or two days of the fair were weekdays and the entrance was open only to industry members and the press; the last two days were scheduled on the weekend and the fair was open to the public.

Besides being an international trade fair, the TAF included related events such as business symposia and other events. Notably, the Tokyo Anime Awards were given for domestic and foreign creations and creators in the event with the name of the event. The event was supported by the Bureau of Industrial and Labor Affairs of Tokyo. Although the event did not have a long history, it and its prizes were recognized in the industry. In 2014, it was merged with the Anime Contents Expo to form AnimeJapan.

== Event history ==
This table shows the number of visitors and participants:

Date	Attendance	Exhibitors	Location
February 15–17, 2002	50,163	104	Tokyo Big Sight, Tokyo
March 19–22, 2003	64,698	138	Tokyo Big Sight, Tokyo
March 25–28, 2004	72,773	166	Tokyo Big Sight, Tokyo
March 31-April 3, 2005	83,966	197	Tokyo Big Sight, Tokyo
March 23–26, 2006	98,984	256	Tokyo Big Sight, Tokyo
March 22–25, 2007	107,713	270	Tokyo Big Sight, Tokyo
March 27–30, 2008	126,622	289	Tokyo Big Sight, Tokyo
March 18–21, 2009	129,819	255	Tokyo Big Sight, Tokyo
March 25–28, 2010	132,492	244	Tokyo Big Sight, Tokyo
2011	Cancelled due to the 2011 Tōhoku earthquake and tsunami event		
March 22–25, 2012	98,923	216	Tokyo Big Sight, Tokyo
March 21–24, 2013	105,855	223	Tokyo Big Sight, Tokyo

== Official theme song ==
Year	Title	Musician
2010	Happy place	Eri-Yuka《Eri Kitamura & Yuka Iguchi》
2012	TAF na Sora-e!!!	Nioh
2013	Kimi ni Todoke	Ars Magna

== 2011 event ==
In December 2010 a group of ten large manga publishers known as the Comic 10 Society (コミック10社会, Comikku 10 Shakai) announced plans to boycott the 2011 event. The boycott was in protest at revisions to the Tokyo Youth Development Ordinance that increased regulation of manga and anime sales to under-18 year olds. This was seen as a deliberate snub of Shintaro Ishihara, who was closely associated with both TAF and the changes to the law. Japanese Prime Minister Naoto Kan had expressed concern about the impact of the boycott and urged the parties involved to work towards resolving the situation.

Due to the devastating earthquake and tsunami that hit the northeast coast of Japan on March 11, 2011, it was announced five days later, that the 2011 event would be canceled. In addition, Tokyo Big Sight, where the event was held annually, suffered unspecified damage during the quake in the Tokyo area.
