= Toshi =

Toshi may refer to:

- Toshi (given name), people with the given name Toshi
- Toshihiko Tahara (born 1961), Japanese idol singer, a solo vocalist
- Toshi (musician) (Toshimitsu Deyama, born 1965), a Japanese singer and musician
- Toshi (comedian) (Toshikazu Miura, born 1976), member of the comedian group Taka and Toshi
- Toshi Automatic (Company), refers to an Indian Automation Company named Toshi Automatic Systems Private Limited
- Toshi Sabri, an Indian singer
- Toshi (American Dad), a recurring character in the show American Dad!
- TOSHI, a fourth-generation cross-platform game engine developed by Blue Tongue Entertainment
- Toshi (search engine), a full-text search engine in Rust (programming language)

== See also ==
- Aiko, Princess Toshi of Japan
- Tama Toshi Monorail Line, Japanese monorail line in western Tokyo
- Yôjû toshi (Wicked City), a Japanese horror novel
  - Wicked City (1987 film), an anime film based on the novel
  - The Wicked City (1992 film), a live-action film based on the novel
