= Wicked City =

Wicked City may refer to:

== Books ==
- The Wicked City (Singer novel), a 1972 children's novel by Isaac Bashevis Singer
- Wicked City (novel series), a series of novels written by Hideyuki Kikuchi
- A 2008 crime novel by Ace Atkins

== Film and TV ==
- The Wicked City (1916 film), a 1916 comedy short starring Gypsy Abbott
- Wicked City (1949 film) (French: Hans le marin), a film starring Maria Montez
- Wicked City (1973 film), an Australian television play
- Wicked City (1987 film), a 1987 Japanese anime adaptation of the first of Kikuchi's novels
- The Wicked City (1992 film), a live-action adaptation of the 1987 anime
- Wicked City (2015 TV series), an American crime drama series on ABC
- Wicked City (2022 TV series), a supernatural television series on ALLBLK

== Music ==
- Wicked City (EP), an EP by Jockstrap
- Wicked City, a musical by Chad Beguelin
