= Masao Maruyama (film producer) =

Japanese anime producer (born 1941)

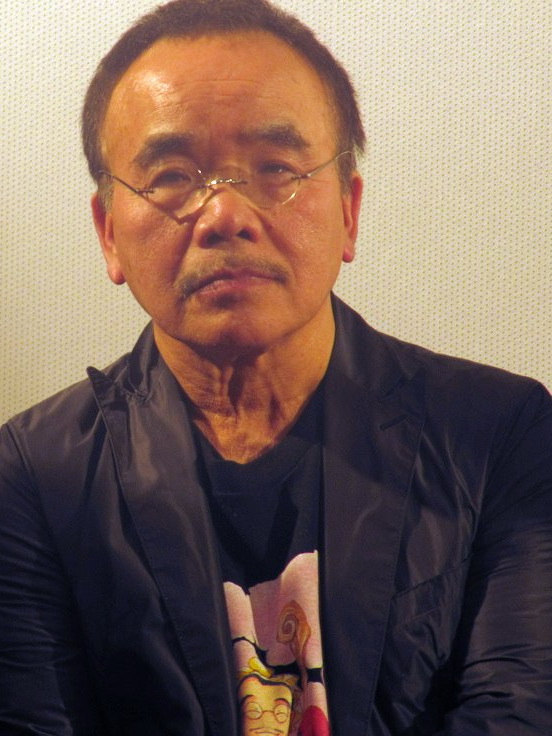
- Maruyama in 2011
- Born: June 19, 1941 (age 85); Shiogama, Japan
- Education: Hosei University, Faculty of Letters
- Occupations: Entrepreneur; animation producer; film producer; television producer; project developer
- Years active: 1963–present
- Known for: Co-founder of Madhouse; Founder of MAPPA; Founder of Studio M2; Founder of Mocco

Masao Maruyama (Japanese: 丸山 正雄, Hepburn: Maruyama Masao; born June 19, 1941) is a Japanese anime producer and entrepreneur. He is the co-founder of Madhouse, as well as the founder of MAPPA and Studio M2 animation studios. He is the current Chairman of MAPPA and President of Studio M2 and Board member of N LITE Japan.

Over a career spanning more than 50 years, Maruyama has founded multiple animation production companies and produced numerous television series, feature films, and original video animations (OVAs). He is also noted for hiring and working with various directors early in their careers, including Satoshi Kon, Mamoru Hosoda, Sunao Katabuchi, Masaaki Yuasa, Mitsuo Iso, Yuichiro Hayashi, Munehisa Sakai, Sayo Yamamoto and Katsuhiro Otomo.

== Early life ==
Maruyama was born in Shiogama, Miyagi Prefecture, in 1941. After graduating from Hosei University in 1963, he spent approximately a year working in irregular jobs before an acquaintance introduced him to Mushi Production, which he joined in 1965. Although he did not initially intend to pursue a career in animation, his encounter with the studio's head, Osamu Tezuka, influenced his decision to remain in the industry. Maruyama later stated that he was fascinated by Tezuka, whom he described as someone who defied conventional norms.

== Career ==
=== Madhouse (1972–2011) ===
In 1972, Maruyama left Mushi Productions to found Madhouse alongside his colleagues Osamu Dezaki, Rintaro, and Yoshiaki Kawajiri. He became the studio's president in 1980, overseeing project planning, production design, and directorial assignments.

In 1987, Maruyama and director Rintaro invited manga artist Katsuhiro Otomo to make his directorial debut with the short film Construction Cancellation Order for the anthology film Neo Tokyo. Maruyama also produced Kawajiri's 1993 film Ninja Scroll, which achieved significant commercial success upon its home video release in North America.

During his tenure as studio head, Maruyama planned or produced numerous feature films, including all of Satoshi Kon's directorial works (Perfect Blue, Millennium Actress, Tokyo Godfathers, Paprika), Mamoru Hosoda's The Girl Who Leapt Through Time and Summer Wars, and Sunao Katabuchi's Mai Mai Miracle. Following Kon's death in August 2010, production was suspended on his unfinished film, Dreaming Machine, for which Maruyama served as producer.

In 2010, Maruyama served as the executive producer for an anime project based on the TV show Supernatural, entitled Supernatural The Animation, which was the world's first animated project from a Japanese anime studio based on an overseas drama series.

Between 2010 and 2011, Maruyama acted as a planner for Marvel Anime, an animated anthology series featuring Iron Man, Wolverine, X-Men and Blade.

=== MAPPA and Studio M2 (2011–present) ===
In June 2011, Maruyama left Madhouse to establish MAPPA (Maruyama Animation Produce Project Association), where Maruyama served as the company's first representative director. The studio was founded in part to produce Sunao Katabuchi's film In This Corner of the World, a project Maruyama had been developing since 2010 but which had faced fundraising delays.

In April 2016, Maruyama stepped down as president of MAPPA, handing leadership to founding member Manabu Otsuka. Maruyama then established Studio M2, a new company specializing in project planning and pre-production, to ensure the completion of his remaining long-term projects.

In 2023, Maruyama joined the board of N LITE Japan to produce the animated film Mfinda.

== Works ==
=== Movies ===
| Year | Title | Japanese name | Director | Role(s) |
|---|---|---|---|---|
| 1981 | Natsu e no Tobira | 夏への扉 | Mori Masaki | Coordinator |
| 1982 | Haguregumo | 浮浪雲 | Mori Masaki | Coordinator |
| 1983 | Unico in the Island of Magic | ユニコ 魔法の島へ | Moribi Murano | Coordinator |
| 1983 | Barefoot Gen | はだしのゲン | Mori Masaki | Coordinator |
| 1983 | Genma Wars | 幻魔大戦 | Rintaro | Coordinator |
| 1984 | Lensman | SF新世紀レンズマン | Kazuyuki Hirokawa, Yoshiaki Kawajiri | Producer |
| 1985 | The Dagger of Kamui | カムイの剣 | Rintaro | Coordinator, Producer |
| 1985 | Bobby ni Kubittake | ボビーに首ったけ | Toshio Hirata | Producer |
| 1986 | Toki no Tabibito: Time Stranger | 時空の旅人 | Mori Masaki | Producer |
| 1986 | Neo Tokyo | 迷宮物語 | Rintaro, Yoshiaki Kawajiri, Katsuhiro Otomo | Story Editor, Producer |
| 1986 | Phenix Hō-ō-hen | 火の鳥 鳳凰編 | Rintaro | Producer |
| 1987 | Barefoot Gen 2 | はだしのゲン2 | Mori Masaki | Coordinator |
| 1987 | Hoero Bun Bun | ほえろブンブン | Shigeru Omachi | Producer |
| 1987 | Wicked City | 妖獣都市 | Yoshiaki Kawajiri | Coordinator |
| 1987 | Gokiburi-tachi no Tasogare | ゴキブリたちの黄昏 | Hiroaki Yoshida | Producer |
| 1988 | Legend of the Galactic Heroes: My Conquest is the Sea of Stars | 銀河英雄伝説 わが征くは星の大海 | Noboru Ishiguro | Production Producer |
| 1993 | Ninja Scroll | 獣兵衛忍風帖 | Yoshiaki Kawajiri | Production Producer |
| 1995 | The Diary of Anne Frank | アンネの日記 | Akinori Nagaoka | Producer |
| 1997 | Perfect Blue | パーフェクトブルー | Satoshi Kon | Producer |
| 1999 | Cardcaptor Sakura: The Movie | 劇場版カードキャプターさくら | Morio Asaka | Planning |
| 2000 | Vampire Hunter D: Bloodlust | バンパイアハンターD | Yoshiaki Kawajiri | Producer |
| 2000 | Cardcaptor Sakura Movie 2: The Sealed Card | 劇場版カードキャプターさくら 封印されたカード | Morio Asaka | Planning |
| 2001 | Metropolis | メトロポリス | Rintaro | Planning |
| 2002 | WXIII: Patlabor the Movie 3 | WXIII 機動警察パトレイバー | Takuji Endo | Producer |
| 2002 | Millennium Actress | 千年女優 | Satoshi Kon | Planning |
| 2003 | Nasu: Summer in Andalusia | 茄子 アンダルシアの夏 | Kitarō Kōsaka | Producer |
| 2003 | Tokyo Godfathers | 東京ゴッドファーザーズ | Satoshi Kon | Planner |
| 2006 | Paprika | パプリカ | Satoshi Kon | Planner |
| 2006 | The Girl Who Leapt Through Time | 時をかける少女 | Mamoru Hosoda | Planner |
| 2007 | Highlander: The Search for Vengeance | ハイランダー: 復讐の探求 | Yoshiaki Kawajiri | Co-Producer |
| 2007 | Forest of Piano | ピアノの森 | Masayuki Kojima | Planner |
| 2007 | Cinnamoroll The Movie | シナモン the Movie | Gisaburō Sugii | Planner |
| 2007 | The Story of a Mouse-The Adventures of George and Gerald- | ねずみ物語 〜ジョージとジェラルドの冒険〜 | Masami Hata | Planner |
| 2008 | Hells Angels | HELLS ANGELS | Yoshinobu Yamakawa | Planner |
| 2009 | Summer Wars | サマーウォーズ | Mamoru Hosoda | Planner |
| 2009 | Mai Mai Miracle | マイマイ新子と千年の魔法 | Sunao Katabuchi | Planner |
| 2010 | Trigun: Badlands Rumble | TRIGUN Badlands Rumble | Satoshi Nishimura | Planner |
| 2010 | Redline | REDLINE | Takeshi Koike | Planner |
| 2011 | The Princess and the Pilot | とある飛空士への追憶 | Jun Shishido | Planner |
| 2012 | The Tibetan Dog | チベット犬物語 〜金色のドージェ〜 | Masayuki Kojima | Planner |
| 2012 | Wolf Children | おおかみこどもの雨と雪 | Mamoru Hosoda | Special Supporters |
| 2013 | Hunter × Hunter: Phantom Rouge | 劇場版 HUNTER×HUNTER 緋色の幻影 | Yūzō Satō | Creative Producer |
| 2016 | In This Corner of the World | この世界の片隅に | Sunao Katabuchi | Planner |
| 2016 | Garo: Divine Flame | 牙狼〈GARO〉-DIVINE FLAME- | Yūichirō Hayashi | Creative Producer |
| 2018 | Usuzumizakura: Garo | 薄墨桜 -GARO- | Satoshi Nishimura | Creative Producer |
| TBA | MFINDA | ムフィンダ | Gisaburō Sugii | Producer |

=== Television series ===
| Year | Title | Japanese name | Director | Role(s) |
|---|---|---|---|---|
| 1965 | The Amazing 3 | W3 | Osamu Tezuka | Assistant Director |
| 1967 | Princess Knight | リボンの騎士 | Osamu Tezuka | Coordinator |
| 1970 | Ashita no Joe | あしたのジョー | Osamu Dezaki | Coordinator |
| 1972 | Hazedon | ハゼドン | Makura Saki (Osamu Dezaki), Fumio Ikeno | Coordinator |
| 1973 | Aim for the Ace! | エースをねらえ! | Osamu Dezaki | Scriptwriter |
| 1976 | Gaiking | 大空魔竜ガイキング | | Story Editor |
| 1976 | Piccolino no Bōken | ピコリーノの冒険 | Masaharu Endō, Hiroshi Saitō | Story Editor |
| 1977 | Jetter Mars | ジェッターマルス | Rintaro | Story Editor |
| 1979 | Animation Travelogue: The Adventures of Marco Polo | アニメーション紀行 マルコ・ポーロの冒険 | Katsuhiko Fujita, Hiroshi Matsumura, Kenichi Murakami, Tetsuji Nakamura, Kazuyuki Sakai | Story Editor |
| 1989 | Yawara! | YAWARA! | Hiroko Tokita | Producer |
| 1994 | DNA² | D・N・A² 〜何処かで失くしたあいつのアイツ〜 | Junichi Sakata | Producer |
| 1998 | Master Keaton | MASTERキートン | Masayuki Kojima | Producer |
| 1998 | Trigun | TRIGUN | Satoshi Nishimura | Planner |
| 1998 | Super Doll Licca-chan | スーパードール★リカちゃん | Gisaburō Sugii | Animation Producer |
| 1999 | Reign: The Conqueror | アレクサンダー戦記 | Yoshinori Kanemori, Rintaro | Producer |
| 1999 | Jubei-chan: The Ninja Girl The Secret of the Lovely Eyepatch | 十兵衛ちゃん -ラブリー眼帯の秘密- | Akitaro Daichi | Producer |
| 1999 | Pet Shop of Horrors | Petshop of Horrors | Toshio Hirata | Planner |
| 1999 | Bomberman B-Daman Bakugaiden V | Bビーダマン爆外伝V | Toshifumi Kawase | Planning Producer |
| 2000 | Boogiepop Phantom | ブギーポップは笑わない Boogiepop Phantom | Takashi Watanabe | Producer |
| 2000 | Sakura Wars | サクラ大戦TV | Ryūtarō Nakamura | Producer |
| 2000 | Carried by the Wind: Tsukikage Ran | 風まかせ月影蘭 | Akitaro Daichi | Planner |
| 2000 | Hidamari no Ki | 陽だまりの樹 | Gisaburō Sugii | Producer |
| 2000 | Hajime no Ippo Season 1: The Fighting! | はじめの一歩 | Satoshi Nishimura | Producer |
| 2001 | Magical Meow Meow Taruto | 魔法少女猫たると | Tsukasa Sunaga | Planning Cooperation |
| 2001 | Chance Pop Session | チャンス〜トライアングルセッション〜 | Susumu Kudō | Planner |
| 2002 | Panyo Panyo Di Gi Charat | ぱにょぱにょデ・ジ・キャラット | Shigehito Takayanagi | Executive Producer |
| 2002 | Dragon Drive | ドラゴンドライブ | Toshifumi Kawase | Planning Producer |
| 2002 | Pita-Ten | ぴたテン | Toshifumi Kawase, Yūzō Satō | Planner |
| 2002 | Chobits | ちょびっツ | Morio Asaka | Planner |
| 2002 | Aquarian Age: Sign for Evolution | アクエリアンエイジ Sign for Evolution | Yoshimitsu Ōhashi | Planner |
| 2002 | Mirage of Blaze | 炎の蜃気楼 | Susumu Kudō | Production Producer |
| 2002 | Rizelmine | りぜるまいん | Yasuhiro Matsumura | Producer |
| 2002 | Hanada Shōnen Shi | 花田少年史 | Masayuki Kojima | Producer |
| 2002 | Magical Shopping Arcade Abenobashi | アベノ橋魔法☆商店街 | Hiroyuki Yamaga | Animation Producer |
| 2003 | Texhnolyze | TEXHNOLYZE | Hiroshi Hamasaki | Executive Producer |
| 2003 | Ninja Scroll: The Series | 獣兵衛忍風帖 龍宝玉篇 | Tatsuo Satō | Planner |
| 2003 | Gunslinger Girl | GUNSLINGER GIRL | Morio Asaka | Planner |
| 2003 | Gungrave | ガングレイヴ | Toshiyuki Tsuru | Planner |
| 2003 | Di Gi Charat Nyo! | デ・ジ・キャラットにょ | Hiroaki Sakurai | Planning Producer |
| 2003 | Uninhabited Planet Survive! | 無人惑星サヴァイヴ | Yūichiro Yano | Planning Producer |
| 2004 | Tenjho Tenge | 天上天下 | Toshifumi Kawase | Producer |
| 2004 | Gokusen | ごくせん | Yūzō Satō | Producer |
| 2004 | Sweet Valerian | スウィート・ヴァレリアン | Hiroaki Sakurai | Planner |
| 2004 | Monster | MONSTER | Masayuki Kojima | Producer |
| 2004 | Jubei-chan: The Ninja Girl The Counter Attack of Siberia Yagyu | 十兵衛ちゃん2 -シベリア柳生の逆襲- | Akitaro Daichi | Planner |
| 2004 | Paranoia Agent | 妄想代理人 | Satoshi Kon | Planner |
| 2004 | Beck | BECK | Osamu Kobayashi | Planner |
| 2005 | Strawberry 100% | いちご100% | Osamu Sekita | Planner |
| 2005 | Paradise Kiss | Paradise Kiss | Osamu Kobayashi | Producer |
| 2005 | Oku-sama wa Joshi Kōsei | おくさまは女子高生 | Jun Shishido | Planner |
| 2005 | Akagi | 闘牌伝説アカギ 〜闇に舞い降りた天才〜 | Yūzō Satō | Producer |
| 2006 | Nana | NANA | Morio Asaka | Producer |
| 2006 | Strawberry Panic | Strawberry Panic | Masayuki Sakoi | Planner |
| 2006 | The Story of Saiunkoku | 彩雲国物語 | Jun Shishido | Animation Producer |
| 2006 | Yume Tsukai | 夢使い | Kazuo Yamazaki | Planner |
| 2006 | Black Lagoon | BLACK LAGOON | Sunao Katabuchi | Planner |
| 2006 | Kemonozume | ケモノヅメ | Masaaki Yuasa | Planner |
| 2006 | A Spirit of the Sun | 太陽の黙示録 | Masayuki Kojima | Planner |
| 2006 | Death Note | DEATH NOTE | Tetsurō Araki | Producer |
| 2006 | Otogi-Jūshi Akazukin | おとぎ銃士 赤ずきん | Takaaki Ishiyama | Planner |
| 2006 | Kiba | 牙 -KIBA- | Hiroshi Kōjina | Planner |
| 2006 | Tokyo Tribes | TOKYO TRIBE2 | Tatsuo Satō | Planner |
| 2007 | Oh! Edo Rocket | 大江戸ロケット | Seiji Mizushima | Planner |
| 2007 | Princess Resurrection | 怪物王女 | Masayuki Sakoi | Planner |
| 2007 | Devil May Cry: The Animated Series | デビルメイクライ | Shin Itagaki | Planner |
| 2007 | Shigurui | シグルイ | Hiroshi Hamasaki | Planner |
| 2007 | Claymore | CLAYMORE | Hiroyuki Tanaka | Producer |
| 2007 | Den-noh Coil | 電脳コイル | Mitsuo Iso | Animation Producer |
| 2007 | Kaiji: Ultimate Survivor | 逆境無頼カイジ | Yūzō Satō | Planner |
| 2007 | Neuro: Supernatural Detective | 魔人探偵脳噛ネウロ | Hiroshi Kōjina | Planner |
| 2007 | MapleStory | メイプルストーリー | Takaaki Ishiyama | Planner |
| 2007 | Mokke | もっけ | Masayoshi Nishida | Planner |
| 2008 | Kamen no Maid Guy | 仮面のメイドガイ | Masayuki Sakoi | Planner |
| 2008 | Chi's Sweet Home | チーズスイートホーム | Mitsuyuki Masuhara | Planner |
| 2008 | Allison & Lillia | アリソンとリリア | Masayoshi Nishida | Planner |
| 2008 | Himitsu – Top Secret | 秘密 〜The Revelation〜 | Hiroshi Aoyama | Planner |
| 2008 | Kaiba | カイバ | Masaaki Yuasa | Planner |
| 2008 | Ultraviolet: Code 044 | ウルトラヴァイオレット:コード044 | Osamu Dezaki | Planner |
| 2008 | Mōryō no Hako | 魍魎の匣 | Ryōsuke Nakamura | Planner |
| 2008 | One Outs | ONE OUTS -ワンナウツ- | Yūzō Satō | Planner |
| 2008 | Chaos;Head | カオス;ヘッド -CHAOS;HEAD- | Takaaki Ishiyama | Planner |
| 2008 | Casshern Sins | キャシャーン Sins | Shigeyasu Yamauchi | Planner |
| 2008 | Kurozuka | 黒塚 -KUROZUKA- | Tetsurō Araki | Planner |
| 2008 | Stitch! | スティッチ! | Masami Hata | Planner |
| 2009 | Hajime no Ippo Season 2: New Challenger | はじめの一歩 New Challenger | Jun Shishido | Planner |
| 2009 | Rideback | RIDEBACK -ライドバック- | Atsushi Takahashi | Planner |
| 2009 | Needless | NEEDLESS | Masayuki Sakoi | Planner |
| 2009 | Aoi Bungaku | 青い文学シリーズ | Morio Asaka, Tetsurō Araki, Shigeyuki Miya, Ryōsuke Nakamura, Atsuko Ishizuka | Planner |
| 2009 | Kobato | こばと。 | Mitsuyuki Masuhara | Planner |
| 2009 | Stitch! ~The Mischievous Alien's Great Adventure~ | スティッチ! 〜いたずらエイリアンの大冒険〜 | Masami Hata | Planner |
| 2010 | Rainbow: Nisha Rokubō no Shichinin | RAINBOW-二舎六房の七人- | Hiroshi Kōjina | Planner |
| 2010 | Iron Man | アイアンマン | Yūzō Satō | Planner |
| 2011 | Wolverine | ウルヴァリン | Hiroshi Aoyama | Planner |
| 2011 | Supernatural: The Anime Series | スーパーナチュラル | Shigeyuki Miya, Atsuko Ishizuka | Executive Producer |
| 2011 | X-Men | X-メン | Fuminori Kizaki | Planner |
| 2011 | Kaiji: Against All Rules | 逆境無頼カイジ 破戒録篇 | Yūzō Satō | Planner |
| 2011 | Blade | ブレイド | Mitsuyuki Masuhara | Planner |
| 2011 | Hunter × Hunter (2011 TV series) | HUNTER×HUNTER | Hiroshi Kōjina | Creative Producer |
| 2011 | Chihayafuru | ちはやふる | Morio Asaka | Creative Producer |
| 2012 | Kids on the Slope | 坂道のアポロン | Shinichirō Watanabe | Creative Producer |
| 2013 | Chihayafuru2 | ちはやふる2 | Morio Asaka | Creative Producer |
| 2013 | Hajime no Ippo Season 3: Rising | はじめの一歩 Rising | Jun Shishido, Satoshi Nishimura | Creative Producer |
| 2014 | Terror in Resonance | 残響のテロル | Shinichirō Watanabe | Production Manager |
| 2014 | Garo: The Carved Seal of Flames | 牙狼-GARO- -炎の刻印- | Yūichirō Hayashi | Creative Producer |
| 2014 | Rage of Bahamut: Genesis | 神撃のバハムート GENESIS | Keiichi Sato | Production Manager |
| 2015 | Punch Line | パンチライン | Yutaka Uemura | Production Manager |
| 2015 | Ushio and Tora | うしおととら | Satoshi Nishimura | Creative Producer |
| 2015 | Garo: Crimson Moon | 牙狼 -紅蓮ノ月- | Atsushi Wakabayashi | Creative Producer |
| 2017 | Onihei | 鬼平 | Shigeyuki Miya | Creative Producer |
| 2018 | Karakuri Circus | からくりサーカス | Satoshi Nishimura | Creative Producer |

=== OVA and others ===
| Year | Title | Japanese name | Director | Role(s) |
|---|---|---|---|---|
| 1986 | Wounded Man | 傷追い人 | Yoshio Takeuchi | Coordinator |
| 1987 | Take the "X" Train | X電車で行こう | Rintaro | Coordinator, Producer |
| 1987 | Junk Boy | JUNK BOY | Katsuhisa Yamada | Producer |
| 1987 | Phoenix: Yamato | 火の鳥 ヤマト編 | Toshio Hirata | Producer |
| 1987 | Phoenix: The Universe | 火の鳥 宇宙編 | Yoshiaki Kawajiri | Producer |
| 1989 | Goku Midnight Eye | MIDNIGHT EYE ゴクウ | Yoshiaki Kawajiri | Coordinator |
| 1990 | Record of Lodoss War | ロードス島戦記 | Akinori Nagaoka | Producer |
| 1990 | Cyber City Oedo 808 | 電脳都市OEDO808 | Yoshiaki Kawajiri | Planner |
| 1990 | Nineteen 19 | NINETEEN 19 | Koichi Chigira | Producer |
| 1991 | Anime Symphony: The Jungle Emperor | アニメ交響詩ジャングル大帝 | Toshio Hirata | Producer |
| 1992 | OZ | OZ | Katsuhisa Yamada | Coordinator |
| 1992 | Zetsuai 1989 | 絶愛-1989- | Takuji Endo | Producer |
| 1992 | Download: Namu Amida Buddha is a Love Poem | ダウンロード 南無阿弥陀仏は愛の詩 | Rintaro | Producer |
| 1993 | Oedo wa nemurenai! | お江戸はねむれない! | Koichi Chigira | Producer |
| 1993 | Mermaid's Scar | 人魚の傷 | Morio Asaka | Planner |
| 1993 | Battle Angel | 銃夢 | Hiroshi Fukutomi | Production Producer |
| 1994 | Clamp in Wonderland | CLAMP IN WONDERLAND | Morio Asaka | Production Producer |
| 1994 | Shin Peacock King | 真・孔雀王 | Rintaro | Production Producer |
| 1994 | Phantom Quest Corp. | 幽幻怪社 | Koichi Chigira, Morio Asaka, Takuji Endo | Planner |
| 1996 | Birdy the Mighty | 鉄腕バーディー | Yoshiaki Kawajiri | Producer |
| 1996 | Wild Arms (video game opening movie) | ワイルドアームズ | | Animation & visual Producer |
| 1997 | Psycho Diver: Demonic Bodhisattva | サイコダイバー 魔性菩薩 | Mamoru Kanbe | Planner, Producer |
| 1998 | Twilight of the Dark Master | 支配者の黄昏 TWILIGHT OF THE DARK MASTER | Akiyuki Shinbo | Producer |
| 2002 | Trava: Fist Planet | TRAVA-FIST PLANET episode 1 | Takeshi Koike, Katsuhito Ishii | Producer |
| 2003 | Hajime no Ippo: Mashiba vs. Kimura | はじめの一歩 間柴vs木村 死刑執行 | Hitoshi Nanba | Producer |
| 2007 | Nasu: A Migratory Bird with Suitcase | 茄子 スーツケースの渡り鳥 | Kitarō Kōsaka | Planner |
| 2011 | Meiji Fruit Juice Gummy Candy Tweet Love Story "Megumi to Taiyo" (TV commercial) | 明治 果汁グミ Tweet Love Story 「メグミとタイヨウ」 | Rintaro | Animation Producer |
| 2012 | Komachi and Dangoro Series (Niigata City PR animation) | 古町と団五郎シリーズ | Hisashi Abe | Producer |
| 2013 | Target (Music Video) | TARGET | | Producer |
| 2023 | Pluto | プルートウ | Toshio Kawaguchi | Executive Producer |

== Legacy and recognition ==
In recognition of his contribution to the industry, Maruyama received the Special Award at the 7th Animation Kobe in 2002 and the Encouragement Award at the 23rd Fujimoto Award in 2003.

=== Cultural Depictions ===
The character Masato Marukawa from the 2014 animated TV series Shirobako is modelled after Maruyama. In the series, Marukawa is depicted as president of the fictional studio Musashino Animation.

=== Public Appearances ===
Maruyama is a frequent guest at the American anime convention Otakon, having attended at least 15 times since 2001. The convention named him an honorary staff member in 2009.
