= Cagaster of an Insect Cage =

Japanese manga series

- Japanese promotional poster

虫籠のカガステル (Mushikago no Kagasuteru)
- Genre: Action; Post-apocalyptic; Science fiction
- Manga
- Written by: Kachō Hashimoto
- Published by: Tokuma Shoten
- English publisher: Ablaze Publishing
- Magazine: Monthly Comic Ryū
- Original run: 2015 – May 19, 2016
- Volumes: 7
- Original net animation
- Directed by: Koichi Chigira
- Produced by: Tang Yunkang
- Written by: Shūichi Kōyama
- Music by: Hitomi Kuroishi
- Studio: Studio Kai (Note: In the opening and ending credits, Studio Kai is credited for Animation Production (アニメーション制作), but the series is animated in 3DCG, which Studio Kai is not capable of animating (due to not having a 3DCG department of their own). Instead, Okinawa Gonzo, the former 3DCG team belonging to Gonzo, is credited for the 3DCG animation, and thus warranting the studio's co-credit with Studio Kai.); Okinawa Gonzo
- Licensed by: Netflix (streaming); Sentai Filmworks (home media)
- Released: February 6, 2020
- Runtime: 25–33 minutes
- Episodes: 12
- icon

Cagaster of an Insect Cage (Japanese: 虫籠のカガステル, Hepburn: Mushikago no Kagasuteru) is a Japanese manga series by Kachō Hashimoto released from 2015 to 2016 in the serialized magazine Monthly Comic Ryū. Prior to becoming a manga series, Cagaster of an Insect Cage was first a dōjinshi series posted on Hashimoto's website, which was published from 2005 to 2013.

The series was adapted into an original net animation (ONA) series produced by Studio Kai and directed by Koichi Chigira, which premiered on Netflix on February 6, 2020.

== Synopsis ==
The series takes place in a post-apocalyptic world that revolves around a virus that turns humans into giant carnivorous insects known as "Cagasters" that feed on humans.

== Media ==
=== Manga ===
Originally published on Kachō Hashimoto's website from 2005 to 2013, Tokuma Shoten picked up the series for publishing under its Comic Ryu brand in 2015. The manga ran for 32 chapters in 7 tankōbon volumes. In 2020, Ablaze Publishing licensed the series for an English release.

=== Anime ===
A Netflix anime adaptation of Hashimoto's manga was originally announced in 2018 with Koichi Chigira directing the series at Gonzo. However, Studio Kai, a company spin-off of Gonzo, took over the series' production. Shūichi Kōyama was in charge of the series composition, and Hitomi Kuroishi composed the score; Akihiko Yamashita adapted the character designs for animation. It was released worldwide on Netflix on February 6, 2020. On December 11, 2020, it was announced that Sentai Filmworks has licensed the anime for home media.

==== Voice cast ====
Character	Japanese	English
Kido	Yoshimasa Hosoya	Aleks Le
Ilie	Kana Hanazawa	Ryan Bartley
Acht	Natsuki Hanae	Griffin Burns
Aisha	Ai Kayano	Rebecca Larsen
Kara	Aoi Yūki	Laura Post
Naji	Daiki Yamashita	Daniel MK Cohen
Griffith	Daisuke Namikawa	Michael Sinterniklaas
Qasim	Junichi Suwabe	Bill Rogers
Jin	Kazuyuki Okitsu	Richard Tatum
Petrov	Kohsuke Toriumi	Doug Erholtz
Franz Kirio	Takahiro Sakurai	Todd Haberkorn
Hadi	Tomohiro Shiozaki	Billy Kametz
Mario	Toshiyuki Morikawa	Kim Strauss
Harb Adham	Yasuhiro Mamiya	Neil Kaplan

== Episodes ==
No.	Title	Original release date
1	"Little Bo Peep"	February 6, 2020
2	"Anchovy and Black Lizard"; Transliteration: "Anchobi to Kuro Tokage" (Japanese: アンチョビとクロトカゲ)	February 6, 2020
3	"From the Abyss"; Transliteration: "Fukaki Fuchi yori" (Japanese: 深き淵より)	February 6, 2020
4	"As a Heartless Sword"; Transliteration: "Kokoronai Ken toshite" (Japanese: 心ない剣として)	February 6, 2020
5	"From the Far East"; Transliteration: "Higashi no Hate kara" (Japanese: 東の果てから)	February 6, 2020
6	"Awakening"; Transliteration: "Mezame" (Japanese: 目覚め)	February 6, 2020
7	"Iliaster"; Transliteration: "Iriasuteru" (Japanese: イリアステル)	February 6, 2020
8	"Princess in the Insect Cage"; Transliteration: "Mushikago no Himegimi" (Japanese: 虫籠の姫君)	February 6, 2020
9	"Insects' Feast"; Transliteration: "Mushi-tachi no Kyōen" (Japanese: 虫たちの饗宴)	February 6, 2020
10	"Up"; Transliteration: "Ue e" (Japanese: 上へ)	February 6, 2020
11	"To You..."; Transliteration: "Anata ni..." (Japanese: あなたに…)	February 6, 2020
12	"Finally, For You"; Transliteration: "Saigo ni Kimi ni" (Japanese: 最後に君に)	February 6, 2020
