= Koichi Chigira =

Japanese animator and director

- Born: 1959 (age 66–67); Kanagawa Prefecture, Japan
- Occupations: Animator, Director
- Years active: 1979–present
- Spouse: Chiaki Yuri
- Children: 1

Koichi Chigira (千明 孝一, Chigira Kōichi; born 1959) is a Japanese animator and director who has directed several anime series, usually working with Gonzo and formerly worked at Madhouse. Chigira is best known for directing Full Metal Panic! and Last Exile.

== Career ==
Chigira joined Tatsunoko Production in 1979, working at the effects department. His first major work was as technical director on Venus Wars in 1989. Chigira later moved to the production department where he worked as a storyboard artist on Miracle Giants Dome-kun. Chigira moved to join Madhouse where he made his directorial debut in the OVA, Nineteen19 as well as Tokyo Babylon.

In the mid 1990s, he worked for many studios including Sunrise where he participated in several installments of the Gundam saga. In 1999, he joined Gonzo and worked on the Blue Submarine No. 6 OVA. He later directed Gate Keepers in 2000 and Full Metal Panic! in 2002. Becoming a prominent member of the studio, he directed the acclaimed Last Exile and the film Brave Story.

== List of works (as director) ==
- Brave Story
- Cagaster of an Insect Cage
- Full Metal Panic!
- Gate Keepers
- Last Exile
- Luck & Logic
- Nineteen 19
- Oedo wa Nemurenai!
- Phantom Quest Corp.
- Ryo
- Tokyo Babylon
- The Tower of Druaga
- Welcome to Lodoss Island!
