= Hotman =

Japanese manga series

- First tankōbon volume cover, featuring Enzo Furiya (left) and his daughter Nanami (right)

ホットマン (Hottoman)
- Genre: Drama
- Manga
- Written by: Sho Kitagawa
- Published by: Shueisha
- Magazine: Weekly Young Jump
- Original run: 1997 – 2000
- Volumes: 15
- Television drama
- Directed by: Satoru Nakajima (S1); Masakazu Eguchi (S2)
- Original network: TBS
- Original run: April 3, 2003 – December 23, 2004
- Episodes: 23

Hotman (Japanese: ホットマン, Hepburn: Hottoman) is a Japanese manga series written and illustrated by Sho Kitagawa. It was serialized in Shueisha's seinen manga magazine Weekly Young Jump from 1997 to 2000, with its chapters collected in 15 tankōbon volumes. It was adapted into a two-season television drama broadcast on TBS; the first season was broadcast from April to June 2003, and the second season from October to December 2004.

== Plot ==
The series follows Enzo Furiya (降矢円造, Furiya Enzō) (portrayed by Takashi Sorimachi), an ex-delinquent and currently a school art teacher who takes care of his 5-year-old daughter, Nanami Furiya (降矢 七海, Furiya Nanami) (portrayed by Nana Yamauchi), of whom he has no idea who her mother is. He also lives with his four siblings whose fathers are all different. Enzo's daughter suffers from severe atopic dermatitis, so he throws himself into managing her diet to alleviate her condition. Enzo pursues life passionately for his little girl and his family. This is a story about how desperately Enzo tries to hold his family together in spite of all the hardships.

== Media ==
=== Manga ===
Written and illustrated by Shō Kitagawa, Hotman was serialized in Shueisha's seinen manga magazine Weekly Young Jump from 1997 to 2000. Shueisha collected its chapters in fifteen tankōbon volumes, released from June 19, 1997, to October 19, 2000; an additional volume, Hotman 2003, was released on June 20, 2003.

=== Drama ===
The manga was adapted into a television drama which was broadcast for two seasons on TBS. The first season was broadcast from April 10 to June 19, 2003; the second season, Hotman 2, was broadcast from October 7 to December 23, 2004.

== See also ==
- Nineteen 19, another manga series by the same author
