= Nineteen 19 =

Japanese manga series

- First volume cover, featuring Kazushi Kubota
- Genre: Romance
- Manga
- Written by: Sho Kitagawa
- Published by: Shueisha
- Imprint: Young Jump Comics
- Magazine: Weekly Young Jump
- Original run: 1988 – 1990
- Volumes: 12
- Original video animation
- Directed by: Koichi Chigira
- Written by: Yuji Kawahara
- Music by: Hiroshi Sakamoto
- Studio: Madhouse
- Released: July 27, 1990
- Runtime: 42 minutes
- icon

Nineteen 19 is a Japanese manga series written and illustrated by Sho Kitagawa. It was serialized in Shueisha's seinen manga magazine Weekly Young Jump from 1988 to 1990, with its chapters collected in twelve wideban volumes. An original video animation (OVA) adaptation by Madhouse was released in July 1990.

== Synopsis ==
Kazushi Kubota is a 19-year-old college student meets again his junior high school first love at a club, Masana Fujisaka, a medical student who models as a side job, and had recently broken up with her longtime boyfriend. Kubota sees the perfect opportunity to ask her out.

== Characters ==
Kazushi Kubota (久保田 一至, Kubota Kazushi)
Voiced by: Masaya Onosaka
Masana Fujisaka (藤崎 雅菜, Fujisaki Masana)
Voiced by: Hiromi Tsuru

== Media ==
=== Manga ===
Nineteen 19, written and illustrated by Sho Kitagawa, was serialized in Shueisha's seinen manga magazine Weekly Young Jump from 1988 to 1990. Shueisha collected its chapters in twelve wideban volumes, released from January 1989 to February 1991.

A prologue chapter to a sequel, titled 19 Forever, was published in Shueisha's Oh Super Jump in December 2010, while the three chapters of 19 Forever were published on the Creek & River's crowdfounding platform Trigger in 2017. A collected volume, which contains the prologue and the three chapters, was released as an ebook on April 6, 2018.

=== Original video animation ===
The manga was adapted into an original video animation (OVA) by Madhouse, directed by Koichi Chigira, with character designs by Naoyuki Onda, scripts by Yuji Kawahara and music by Hiroshi Sakamoto. It was released on July 27, 1990.

== Reception ==
In The Anime Encyclopedia: A Century of Japanese Animation, by Jonathan Clements and Helen McCarthy, they wrote: "[a] tale of yuppie love isn't what most Westerners expect from the Madhouse team, renowned abroad for horror like Wicked City, but this exudes quiet charm and elegance." Justin Sevakis of Anime News Network wrote: "Nineteen19 is a reflection on a simpler time, on youth, and first loves. It's a rare, fashionably-idealized look at what it means to be a single guy, and a window on a world and a pop culture that doesn't exist anymore, if it ever really existed at all."

== See also ==
- Hotman, another manga series by the same author
