= List of Hajime no Ippo episodes =

Key visual for the series

Hajime no Ippo is a 2000 Japanese anime series based on the manga written by George Morikawa. The first 75-episode anime season, produced by Madhouse, Nippon Television and VAP and directed by Satoshi Nishimura, aired on Nippon TV between October 4, 2000, and March 27, 2002. The episodes were collected into twenty-five DVDs released by VAP from March 16, 2001, to March 21, 2003. The last DVD includes a special episode which did not air in Japan, numbered 76. A television film titled Hajime no Ippo: Champion Road aired on April 18, 2003. An original video animation (OVA) titled Hajime no Ippo Mashiba vs. Kimura was released on September 5, 2003.

A second season titled Hajime no Ippo: New Challenger aired on Nippon TV from January 6 to June 30, 2009.

In 2009, Rikiya Koyama, the voice actor of Mamoru Takamura, revealed in his blog that a sequel to the Hajime no Ippo: New Challenger season was being planned. At the end of his blog entry, he wrote, "Of course, a sequel is also being planned!!". In July 2013, it was reported in that year's 34th issue of Kodansha's Weekly Shōnen Magazine that a third season of Hajime no Ippo would air in the fall 2013 season. The third season, titled Hajime no Ippo: Rising, ran for 25 episodes from October 5, 2013, to March 29, 2014. Hajime no Ippo: Rising was streamed on Crunchyroll.

In North America, the first season was licensed by Geneon Entertainment in 2003, which released it under the name Fighting Spirit. Geneon distributed Fighting Spirit on 15 DVDs with five episodes per disc. The first DVD was released on July 6, 2004, and the fifteenth released on December 19, 2006. The DVDs included English and Spanish language tracks, as well as the original Japanese. The TV film Champion Road was released on North America on January 9, 2007. There were no plans to release the OVA, Mashiba vs. Kimura. Disc sales of the series did not perform well. In September 2020, Discotek Media announced that they have licensed the series for a 2021 release, including the 76 episodes, Champion Road and, for the first time in North America, the OVA Mashiba vs. Kimura. The first Blu-ray Disc set (episodes 1–24) was released on January 26, 2021. The second set (episodes 25–48) was released on March 30, 2021.

== Series overview ==
Season	Episodes	Originally released	
Season	Episodes	First released	Last released
1	76	October 3, 2000	March 27, 2002
2	26	January 6, 2009	June 30, 2009
3	25	October 5, 2013	March 29, 2014

== Episodes ==
=== Season 1: The Fighting! (2000−02) ===
Round	Title	Directed by	Written by	Original release date
1	"The First Step"; Transliteration: "Saisho no suteppu" (Japanese: 最初のステップ)	Kenichi Kawamura	Tatsuhiko Urahata	October 4, 2000
Ippo Makunouchi is a shy young man who works with his mother, Hiroko on their fishing boat business while he attends school, so he has no time to hang out with friends. One day, as Ippo is walking backwards home, he is approached by Masahiko Umezawa and two other bullies. They start beating him up and make fun of him and his mother. Suddenly, a jogger walks by and scares the bullies away. Ippo loses consciousness, so the jogger takes him to his boxing gym and heals his injuries. When he wakes up, Ippo is amazed by all the boxers working out. The jogger then convinces Ippo to punch a punching bag with the bully's face drawn on it. Even though his hand gets bruised, the jogger notices Ippo has a very strong punch. He gives him some world championship boxing tapes to look over and sends him home. Inspired by the tapes, Ippo seeks out the jogger, Mamoru Takamura, who is a middle-weight professional boxer, and begs him to train him in order to fulfill his dream of becoming a professional boxer. To test him, Takamura kicks a tree and catches many leaves in his hand, using his lightning-fast jabs. He tells Ippo that if he can do the same, he will train him.
2	"Fruits of Labor"; Transliteration: "Doryoku no seika" (Japanese: 努力の成果)	Saburō Hashimoto	Tatsuhiko Urahata	October 10, 2000
Ippo's goal was to catch 10 leaves, with only a week to do so. While balancing school and work, Ippo also practiced his jabs. Finally, he figured out not only to increase the speed of his jabs, but also caught all 10 leaves in his left hand. Impressed, Takamura then assigns Ippo to work out his muscles, body and running speed for one month. Once done, Takamura takes Ippo back to the gym to test out his skills. His first test was to spar with a rookie the same age as Ippo, Ichiro Miyata.
3	"Tears of Joy"; Transliteration: "Ureshi namida" (Japanese: うれし涙)	Hitoshi Nanba	Tatsuhiko Urahata	October 17, 2000
At first, it seems that Ippo could not keep up with Miyata, given the fact that the latter is more experienced. Ippo keeps taking hit after hit and gets knocked down twice. After receiving some advice from Takamura, Ippo keeps getting back up to fight. To everyone's surprise, Ippo keeps absorbing Miyata's punches. Suddenly, Miyata hits Ippo's chin, causing his brain to move back and forth. However, Ippo was able to keep up with Miyata's movements, but unfortunately lost to Miyata's superior skills. However, the owner of the gym, Genji Kamogawa, was impressed by Ippo's determination and decides to train him every day in the gym.
4	"Shadow Boxing"; Transliteration: "Shadō bokushingu" (Japanese: シャドーボクシング)	Nanako Shimazaki	Daisuke Aranishi	October 24, 2000
Ippo finally begins his training in the gym. First, Kamogawa himself, helps Ippo to focus on his jabs and the one-two technique. After getting the hang of it, Kamogawa instructs Ippo to practice shadow boxing. Though some patrons in the gym show him how to do it, Ippo tries again and again. However, as he watches Miyata sparring, he starts to finally understand how to shadow box. Takamura and Kamogawa realize what a great talent Ippo has, but Miyata feels jealousy towards him.
5	"Three Months to Counter"; Transliteration: "Kauntaa he no mitsuki" (Japanese: カウンターへの3ヶ月)	Toshiharu Sato	Kazuyuki Fudeyasu	October 31, 2000
Ippo begins training with coach Kamogawa for about three months in order to prepare for a rematch with Miyata. During that time, he begins working on more techniques. Also, he learns more about Miyata's father, who was a former professional boxer who believes in skill surpassing power. However, in his final match, he lost and realised that that power surpasses skill. Since then, Miyata is trying to prove that his father's way of boxing is correct. After more training, Ippo is finally ready for his rematch with Miyata.
6	"The Opening Bell of the Rematch"; Transliteration: "Saisen no gongu" (Japanese: 再戦のゴング)	Yasuo Iwamoto	Kenji Sugihara	November 7, 2000
A representative from a boxing magazine comes to Kamogawa's Gym on the same day Ippo and Miyata have their rematch. With Takamura as referee, the rematch begins. Both fighters begin their four-round match, each displaying their progress during the last three months. Each one knocking each other once, taking their audience's breath away.
7	"The Destructive Force of 1 cm" Transliteration: "1 cm no hakairyoku" (Japanese: 1cmの破壊力)	Yūji Yamaguchi	Tatsuhiko Urahata	November 14, 2000
Ippo and Miyata's match continue. After Ippo gets knocked down, he struggles to get back up. Once he gets up, Ippo continues with his assault. The punches keep on flying, but then Miyata changes strategies in order to slow down Ippo's movements, which succeeds. After a few more hits, Ippo finally gets his chance and launches an uppercut, grazing Miyata's chin. This causes Miyata to fall to his knees, losing due to a K.O. Even though Miyata felt humiliated, his father still thought he had a good fight. Ippo went to bed later that night, feeling proud.
8	"Promise to Meet Again"; Transliteration: "Saikai no yakusoku" (Japanese: 再会の約束)	Akira Mano	Yasuko Kamo	November 21, 2000
With Miyata nowhere to be found, Ippo seems distracted in his training, so Kamogawa sends him to train with Takamura. Ippo experiences all the hardship his mentor endures since he prepares for a championship match. Takamura easily defeats his opponent due to his training and diet. Outside, Ippo meets Miyata, who informs him that he is quitting Kamogawa's Gym and promises to meet Ippo in the ring as professional boxers.
9	"C Class License"; Transliteration: "C kyū raisensu" (Japanese: C級ライセンス)	Rokō Ogiwara	Hiroshi Mori	November 28, 2000
Ippo finally applies to get his featherweight boxing license, with Takamura tagging along. During the exam, he meets Ryo Mashiba, a ruthless boxer with a deadly combo. Six months after he began his training, Ippo finally gained his license. Even his former bullies are no match for his speed. Back at Kamogawa's Gym, Ippo is about to learn the name of his opponent in his debut match.
10	"Debut Match!"; Transliteration: "Debyū sen!" (Japanese: デビュー戦!)	Mitsuyuki Masuhara	Ryōsuke Nakamura	December 5, 2000
Ippo's first opponent is Yosuke Oda. However, Oda is more focused on goofing off and going out with his coach's daughter. He also seemed to be overconfident. Unfortunately for Oda, Keiko, his girlfriend, decides to break up with him if he loses his match, due to him losing his passion for the sport. Oda decides to dedicate the next week to train as much as he can in preparation for the match. The day finally arrives and both Ippo and Oda get into the ring with cheering fans all around them.
11	"Obsession for Victory"; Transliteration: "Shōri no shūnen" (Japanese: 勝利への執念へ)	Shinichi Tsuji	Daisuke Aranishi	December 12, 2000
The four round match finally begins. Each fighter delivers harsh blow after harsh blow, with their teams shouting advice. Miyata arrives secretly to watch the match. However, Oda's hook actually cuts Ippo's left side of the face around his eye. The doctor warns him that if he bleeds again, he will lose with a technical K.O. Unwilling to let that happen, Ippo goes all out to take out Oda, and he does with his most powerful jabs, earning him victory. In the locker room, Oda swears to continue training and Keiko, having forgiven him, urges him to continue working hard. Ippo and his friends celebrate after the match.
12	"Becoming a Bully's Buddy"; Transliteration: "Tearana Dachi Sengen" (Japanese: 手荒なダチ宣言)	Yasuhiro Matsumura; Jun Shishido	Kazuyuki Fudeyasu	December 19, 2000
Ippo's second match is against Yoshio Fujigawa. However, Umezawa and his two friends actually go to Ippo's match to cheer him on. After working on a new guarding technique, Ippo seems to be on top. However, his opponent starts to play dirty by cheating. But, Ippo's determination allows him to fight back and break his opponent's guard with a mighty uppercut. The next day, Umezawa decides to become Ippo's friend and tells everyone about Ippo's mighty victory.
13	"The Eastern Japan Rookie Championship Tournament Begins"; Transliteration: "Kaimaku, higashi nippon shinjin Ō sen" (Japanese: 開幕、東日本新人王戦)	Nanako Shimazaki	Kenji Sugihara	December 26, 2000
The Rookie Championship is about to begin. Ippo's first opponent is an American soldier, Jason Ozma, who is based in Japan. To prepare for the match, Ippo trains with Takamura while practicing to dodge hooks and uppercuts. Ozma, on the other hand, trains for the people he came to know in the Japanese gym where he was based.
14	"Powerful Arms! Hook vs. Uppercut!"; Transliteration: "Kyou ude! Fukku vs appaa!" (Japanese: 強腕!フックvsアッパー!)	Akira Mano	Ryōsuke Nakamura	January 9, 2001
Ippo and Ozma begin their match. Both of them give powerful blows, each surprising one another. Each boxer tries to think of a strategy to take out the other, until Ozma knocks Ippo down. After a brief moment, he gets up and each counter with a punch to each other's face. The intensity of the match continues.
15	"Test of Endurance"; Transliteration: "Gaman kurabe" (Japanese: 我慢くらべ)	Kenichi Kawamura	Kazuyuki Fudeyasu	January 16, 2001
The match continues between Ippo and Ozma, with each fighter dealing one crushing blow after another. Oma manages to knock Ippo down, and it looked like he was down for the count. However, Ippo managed to get up and continue the assault, following his coach's advice on pretending like he feels no pain. Ozma is then knocked down himself. He manages to get up as well. As the fighters continue, Ippo receives one crushing blow after another, until he ducks and gives a huge uppercut to Ozma's chest, knocking him down. Ippo wins his first tournament match and thanks Ozma for the incredible fight. Ozma wishes him luck for his next matches. Both boxers receive applause and praise from the audience as they leave the ring.
16	"Anticipating a Fierce Fight"; Transliteration: "Gekisen no yokan" (Japanese: 激戦の予感)	Mitsuyuki Masuhara	Daisuke Aranishi	January 23, 2001
Ippo and Takamura, along with a girl that Ippo has a crush on, sees Miyata's match. Miyata completely lowered his opponent's guard and quickly took him out. Afterwards, Ippo and his friends at the gym saw some videos of some of the next opponents he would face in the tournament. Later, after meeting the girl at a bakery where she worked, Ippo received a call from Takamura about a training camp for preparation for his next match.
17	"Ippo on the Beach"; Transliteration: "Ippo on za bīchi" (Japanese: イッポ·オン·ザ·ビーチ)	Yūzō Satō	Yasuko Kamo	January 30, 2001
Ippo, Takamura and their two friends from the gym, Aoki and Kimura go to training camp, which also involves fun at the beach. After sunset, the gang of four start running and practicing shadow boxing at their hut. Ippo also learns about movement with his feet from Takamura, which happened to be Ippo's weakness. After a fireworks celebration, all four boxers head home.
18	"Clinch"; Transliteration: "Kurinchi" (Japanese: クリンチ)	Takaaki Ishiyama	Hiroshi Mori	February 6, 2001
Ippo and Takamura both start preparing as it turns out Ippo is fighting in the opener for the big Takamura match. Results from Ippo training camp show in a sparring match against Kimura. When he rushes out to buy a drink, he finds his opponent (Kenta Kobashi) spying on him and looking to exploit any weakness which worries Ippo. Kenta who is also nervous about the match trains and discusses his opponent's Weaknesses with his coach (Mr Yasoda). At the Venue, both fighters psych themselves for the match. As soon as the match starts Kenta draws a long guard with his left. Ippo takes an aggressive approach and starts throwing punches. Kenta is a little shocked but manages to block Ippo's punches while getting a good read on their speed and power. Kenta uses his long left to steer Ippo away. Ippo finally steps in close to land an uppercut but Kenta breaks it by clenching Ippo. this confuses Ippo and Kenta starts to land soft blows on Ippo. Ippo corners Kenta but he clenches again until the clock runs out. In the second round, Kenta starts with an aggressive approach and disrupts Ippo Rythem out again. Ippo is tiring himself out throwing wide punches but manages to corner Kenta. When Ippo goes for the finishing move Kenta clinches again and breaks it off. Coach Komagawa notices Ippo getting tired.
19	"Dream of a KO"; Transliteration: "KO no yume" (Japanese: KOの夢)	Yasuhiro Matsumura; Jun Shishido	Kazuyuki Fudeyasu	February 13, 2001
20	"The Threat of Shotgun"; Transliteration: "Shottogan no kyōi" (Japanese: ショットガンの脅威)	Hideo Hayashi	Ryōsuke Nakamura	February 20, 2001
21	"The Way to Capture a Prodigy"; Transliteration: "Tensai kōryaku no michi" (Japanese: 天才攻略の道)	Akira Mano	Kenji Sugihara	February 27, 2001
22	"Forward! Forward!!"; Transliteration: "Mae! Mae!!" (Japanese: 前へ!前へ!!)	Mitsuyuki Masuhara	Yasuko Kamo	March 6, 2001
23	"The Other Semi-Final"; Transliteration: "Mō hitotsu no junkesshō" (Japanese: もう一つの準決勝)	Nanako Shimazaki	Daisuke Aranishi	March 13, 2001
24	"To the Promised Place..."; Transliteration: "Yakusoku no basho e" (Japanese: 約束の場所へ...)	Yoshito Hata	Hiroshi Mori	March 20, 2001
25	"Grudges, Sorrow & Dreams"; Transliteration: "Sorezore no omoi" (Japanese: それぞれの想い)	Jun Shishido	Kazuyuki Fudeyasu	March 27, 2001
26	"The Battle for Distance"; Transliteration: "Kyori no kōbō" (Japanese: 距離の攻防)	Yukina Hiiro	Kenji Sugihara	April 3, 2001
27	"Death Match"; Transliteration: "Shitō" (Japanese: 死闘)	Kenichi Kawamura	Ryōsuke Nakamura	April 10, 2001
28	"Victory or Defeat"; Transliteration: "Shōhai" (Japanese: 勝敗)	Akira Mano	Yasuko Kamo	April 17, 2001
29	"Rocky of Naniwa"; Transliteration: "Naniwa no Rocky" (Japanese: 浪速のロッキー)	Shinichi Masaki	Daisuke Aranishi	April 24, 2001
30	"To Enemy Ground"; Transliteration: "Tekichi e" (Japanese: 敵地へ)	Nanako Shimazaki	Ryōsuke Nakamura	May 1, 2001
31	"Traces of Intense Battles"; Transliteration: "Gekitō no sokuseki" (Japanese: 激闘の足跡)	Kenichi Kawamura	Tatsuhiko Urahata	May 8, 2001
Minoru is tasked with writing a new article. As he thinks of new ideas, he recalls and details all of the fights Ippo has been in since starting the Eastern Japan Rookie Championship Tournament.
32	"Throw Your Right!"; Transliteration: "Migi wo ute!" (Japanese: 右を打て!)	Jun Shishido	Kazuyuki Fudeyasu	May 15, 2001
33	"Smash Force"; Transliteration: "Sumasshu no iatsu" (Japanese: スマッシュの威圧)	Mitsuyuki Masuhara	Kenji Sugihara	May 22, 2001
34	"The Rookie King"; Transliteration: "Shinjin Ō" (Japanese: 新人王)	Yukina Hiiro	Yasuko Kamo	May 29, 2001
35	"The Counting Journey"; Transliteration: "Saranaru tabidachi" (Japanese: さらなる旅立ち)	Akira Mano	Kazuyuki Fudeyasu	June 5, 2001
36	"The Champ and I"; Transliteration: "Ōja tono deai" (Japanese: 王者との出会い)	Keiji Hayakawa	Daisuke Aranishi	June 12, 2001
37	"A Thing to Strive For"; Transliteration: "Mezasu mono" (Japanese: 目指すもの)	Kentarō Nakamura	Kenji Sugihara	June 19, 2001
38	"Two Rookies of the Year"; Transliteration: "Futari no shinjin ō" (Japanese: 二人の新人王)	Jun Shishido	Ryōsuke Nakamura	June 27, 2001
39	"Challenge in a Foreign Land"; Transliteration: "Ikoku de no chōsen" (Japanese: 異国での挑戦)	Yukina Hiiro	Kazuyuki Fudeyasu	July 4, 2001
40	"A Counter to Surpass All Counters"; Transliteration: "Kauntaa wo koeta kauntaa" (Japanese: カウンターを超えたカウンター)	Yūzō Satō	Kenji Sugihara	July 11, 2001
41	"Barf-michi's Big Fight"; Transliteration: "Barf-michi no tatakai" (Japanese: ゲロ道の戦い)	Masayuki Kojima; Mitsuyuki Masuhara (assistant)	Kazuyuki Fudeyasu	July 18, 2001
42	"Sharing a Dream"; Transliteration: "Yume e no kyōkan" (Japanese: 夢への共感)	Akira Mano; Mitsuyuki Masuhara (assistant)	Yasuko Kamo	July 25, 2001
43	"The Speed Star"	Hiromitsu Morita	Daisuke Aranishi	August 1, 2001
44	"Blind Spot in the Ring"; Transliteration: "Ringu no shikaku" (Japanese: リングの死角)	Yoshito Hata	Ryōsuke Nakamura	August 8, 2001
45	"The White Fangs of the Wolf"; Transliteration: "Ōkami no shiroi kiba" (Japanese: 狼の白い牙)	Nanako Shimazaki	Kazuyuki Fudeyasu	August 15, 2001
46	"Be the Gazelle"; Transliteration: "Kamoshikani nare!" (Japanese: かもしかになれ!)	Jun Shishido	Kazuyuki Fudeyasu	August 22, 2001
47	"The Fighting Spirit Within"; Transliteration: "Himerareta toushi" (Japanese: 秘められた闘志)	Mihiro Yamaguchi	Kenji Sugihara	August 29, 2001
48	"The Red Wolf"; Transliteration: "Akai ōkami" (Japanese: 赤い狼)	Yoshio Suzuki	Kazuyuki Fudeyasu	September 5, 2001
49	"The Courage to Believe"; Transliteration: "Shinrai suru yuuki" (Japanese: 信頼する勇気)	Yukina Hiiro	Daisuke Aranishi	September 19, 2001
50	"Something to Convey"; Transliteration: "Tsutaetai koto" (Japanese: 伝えたいこと)	Kentarō Nakamura	Kazuyuki Fudeyasu	September 26, 2001
51	"The Group Date"; Transliteration: "Gōkon" (Japanese: 合コン)	Mitsuyuki Masuhara	Yasuko Kamo	October 3, 2001
52	"The Challenger"; Transliteration: "Chōsensha" (Japanese: 挑戦者)	Kenichi Kawamura	Tatsuhiko Urahata	October 10, 2001
53	"So That I Can Be Myself"; Transliteration: "Ore ga ore de aru tame ni" (Japanese: 俺が俺であるために)	Yasuhiro Sugimura	Ryōsuke Nakamura	October 17, 2001
54	"Fists of the Champ"; Transliteration: "Ōja no kobushi" (Japanese: 王者の拳)	Atsushi Takahashi	Kazuyuki Fudeyasu	October 24, 2001
55	"The Japan Featherweight Title Match"; Transliteration: "Nippon fezākyū taitorumacchi" (Japanese: 日本フェザー級タイトルマッチ)	Shinichi Masaki	Daisuke Aranishi	October 31, 2001
56	"The Power that Stands in the Way"; Transliteration: "Tachi hadakaru chikara" (Japanese: 立ちはだかる力)	Kentarō Nakamura	Kenji Sugihara	November 7, 2001
57	"Conclusion"; Transliteration: "Ketchaku" (Japanese: 決着)	Mitsuyuki Masuhara	Yasuko Kamo	November 14, 2001
58	"Heartbroken"; Transliteration: "Shōshin" (Japanese: 傷心)	Nanako Shimazaki	Kazuyuki Fudeyasu	November 21, 2001
59	"A Determined Gaze"; Transliteration: "Ketsui no manazashi" (Japanese: 決意のまなざし)	Yukina Hiiro	Daisuke Aranishi	November 28, 2001
60	"Rival"; Transliteration: "Raibaru" (Japanese: ライバル)	Kentarō Nakamura	Ryōsuke Nakamura	December 5, 2001
61	"Comeback Anxiety"; Transliteration: "Saiki he no fuan" (Japanese: 再起への不安)	Yasuhiro Sugimura; Kenichi Kawamura	Kenji Sugihara	December 12, 2001
62	"Revival"; Transliteration: "Tukkatsu" (Japanese: 復活)	Kenichi Kawamura; Lee Kwan-sup (assistant)	Yasuko Kamo	December 19, 2001
63	"Youth of Fire"; Transliteration: "Honou no seishun" (Japanese: 炎の青春)	Ryōsuke Nakamura	Kazuyuki Fudeyasu	December 26, 2001
64	"Hot Rod Era"; Transliteration: "Netchuu jidai" (Japanese: 熱中時代)	Atsushi Takahashi	Daisuke Aranishi	January 9, 2002
65	"The Summer of the Kamogawa Corps"; Transliteration: "Kamogawa gundan no natsu" (Japanese: 鴨川軍団の夏)	Mitsuyuki Masuhara	Ryōsuke Nakamura	January 16, 2002
66	"Mr. Takamura's Tears"; Transliteration: "Takamura-san no namida" (Japanese: 鷹村さんの涙)	Nanako Shimazaki	Kazuyuki Fudeyasu	January 23, 2002
67	"The Kamogawa Gym Swings Into Action"; Transliteration: "Ugokidasu Kamogawa jimu" (Japanese: 動き出す鴨川ジム)	Mihiro Yamaguchi	Kenji Sugihara	January 30, 2002
68	"The Chief's Peril"; Transliteration: "Kaichou no kiki" (Japanese: 会長の危機)	Yoshiyuki Takei	Daisuke Aranishi	February 6, 2002
69	"The Trap of the Southpaw"; Transliteration: "Sausupoo no wana" (Japanese: サウスポーの罠)	Yukina Hiiro	Shingō Nishikawa	February 13, 2002
70	"The Young Punk"; Transliteration: "Gontakure" (Japanese: ごんたくれ)	Kentarō Nakamura	Kōji Aritomi	February 20, 2002
71	"Time for the Showdown"; Transliteration: "Kessen no kiza" (Japanese: 決戦の刻)	Shinji Satō	Ryōsuke Nakamura	February 27, 2002
72	"Lallapallooza"; Transliteration: "Raraparūza" (Japanese: ララパルーザ)	Yoshiyuki Takei; Kenichi Kawamura	Yasuko Kamo	March 6, 2002
73	"Surpass that Moment"; Transliteration: "Ano toki wo koero" (Japanese: あの時を超えろ)	Nanako Shimazaki	Ryōsuke Nakamura	March 13, 2002
74	"Mix-Up"; Transliteration: "Mikkusu appu" (Japanese: ミックスアップ)	Yukina Hiiro	Kenji Sugihara	March 20, 2002
75	"A Step Further"; Transliteration: "Satanaru ippo wo" (Japanese: さらなる一歩を)	Kentarō Nakamura	Kazuyuki Fudeyasu	March 27, 2002
76	"Boxer's Fist"; Transliteration: "Bokusā no Kobushi" (Japanese: ボクサーの拳)	Kenichi Kawamura	Tatsuhiko Urahata	March 21, 2003
Special	"Champion Road" (Japanese: はじめの一歩)	Satoshi Nishimura	Tatsuhiko Urahata	April 18, 2003
OVA	"Mashiba vs. Kimura" (Japanese: 間柴vs木村 死刑執行)	Hitoshi Nanba	Kazuyuki Fudeyasu	September 5, 2003

=== Season 2: New Challenger (2009) ===
Round	No. in season	Title	Directed by	Written by	Original release date
77	1	"The New Step"; Transliteration: "Arata Naru Ippo" (Japanese: 新たなる一歩)	Tomoya Takahashi	Kazuyuki Fudeyasu	January 6, 2009
78	2	"Bloody Cross"; Transliteration: "chi no juujika" (Japanese: 血の十字架-)	Satoshi Ōsedo	Kazuyuki Fudeyasu	January 13, 2009
79	3	"To the Promised Place"; Transliteration: "Yakusoku no Basho e" (Japanese: 約束の場所へ)	Takaaki Suzuki	Kazuyuki Fudeyasu	January 20, 2009
80	4	"Towards the World"; Transliteration: "Sekai e no Taidō" (Japanese: 世界への胎動)	Hisato Shitada	Kazuyuki Fudeyasu	January 27, 2009
81	5	"The Strength of the World"; Transliteration: "Sekai no Chikara" (Japanese: 世界の力)	Tomoya Takahashi	Kazuyuki Fudeyasu	February 3, 2009
82	6	"A Figure to Chase After"; Transliteration: "Oi Tsudukeru Senaka" (Japanese: 追い続ける背中)	Takahiro Natori	Kazuyuki Fudeyasu	February 10, 2009
83	7	"The Advent of the Devil"; Transliteration: "Akuma No Kōrin" (Japanese: 悪魔の降臨)	Takaaki Suzuki	Kazuyuki Fudeyasu	February 17, 2009
84	8	"Spirit for One Last Attack"; Transliteration: "Tamashii no Ichigeki" (Japanese: 魂の一撃)	Satoshi Ōsedo	Kazuyuki Fudeyasu	February 24, 2009
85	9	"Inheritance Qualifications"; Transliteration: "Uketsugu Shikaku" (Japanese: 受け継ぐ資格)	Hisato Shitada	Kazuyuki Fudeyasu	March 3, 2009
86	10	"Biting Dog"; Transliteration: "Kama Se Inu" (Japanese: 噛ませ犬)	Fumie Muroi	Kazuyuki Fudeyasu	March 10, 2009
87	11	"Ippo vs. Hammer Nao"; Transliteration: "Ippo VS Hanmaanao" (Japanese: 一歩vsハンマーナオ)	Fujiaki Asari	Kazuyuki Fudeyasu	March 17, 2009
88	12	"Requirements For A Pro"; Transliteration: "Puro no Jōken" (Japanese: プロの条件)	Kim Min-sun	Kazuyuki Fudeyasu	March 24, 2009
89	13	"Ippo on the Beach 2"; Transliteration: "Ippo on za Biichi 2" (Japanese: イッポ·オン·ザ·ビーチ2)	Futoshi Higashide	Jun Nakagawa	March 31, 2009
90	14	"Two Spars"; Transliteration: "Futatsu no Supaaringu" (Japanese: 二つのスパーリング)	Tomoya Takahashi	Fūta Takei	April 7, 2009
91	15	"Itagaki's Debut Fight!"; Transliteration: "Itagaki Debyū Sen!" (Japanese: 板垣デビュー戦!)	Takaaki Suzuki	Kotono Watanabe	April 15, 2009
92	16	"The Two Hawks"; Transliteration: "2 Hane no Taka" (Japanese: 2羽の鷹)	Kim Min-sun	Yasuhiro Kadowaki	April 21, 2009
93	17	"Wild Kid"; Transliteration: "Yasei Ji" (Japanese: 野性児)	Mana Uchiyama	Eri Kuno	April 28, 2009
94	18	"Extreme Weight Control"; Transliteration: "Kyokugen no Genryō" (Japanese: 極限の減量)	Fujiaki Asari	Fumie Muroi	May 5, 2009
95	19	"Critical Situation"; Transliteration: "Isshokusokuhatsu" (Japanese: 一触即発)	Yoshifumi Sueda	Mina Tsuchiya	May 12, 2009
96	20	"Junior Middleweight World Title Match"; Transliteration: "Sekai J. Midoru Kyū Taitorumacchi" (Japanese: 世界J·ミドル級タイトルマッチ)	Takahiro Natori	Makoto Moriwaki	May 19, 2009
97	21	"Battle of Hawk"	Takahiro Ikezoe	Takao Yoshihara	May 26, 2009
98	22	"Brawl"; Transliteration: "Kenka Battoru" (Japanese: ケンカバトル)	Kim Min-sun; Tomoya Takahashi (assistant)	Shinichi Ōuchi	June 2, 2009
99	23	"Supporting Hand"; Transliteration: "Sasaeru Te" (Japanese: 支える手)	Yukina Hiiro	Fūta Takei	June 9, 2009
100	24	"The King"; Transliteration: "Ou-sama" (Japanese: 王様)	Fumie Muroi; Tomoya Takahashi (assistant)	Jun Nakagawa	June 16, 2009
101	25	"Please Accept This Bronze Statue"; Transliteration: "Douzou wo Douzo" (Japanese: 銅像をどうぞ)	Eiichi Kuboyama	Makoto Moriwaki	June 23, 2009
102	26	"New Challenger"; Transliteration: "Atarashī charenjā" (Japanese: 新しいチャレンジャー)	Kotono Watanabe	Makoto Moriwaki	June 30, 2009

=== Season 3: Rising (2013−14) ===
Round	No. in season	Title	Directed by	Written by	Original release date
103	1	"The Greatest Challenger"; Transliteration: "Saikyo no Chōsensha" (Japanese: 最強の挑戦者)	Minoru Yamaoka; Shun Kudō (assistant)	Kazuyuki Fudeyasu	October 5, 2013
104	2	"The Dempsey Roll Destroyed"; Transliteration: "Denpushī Rōru Yaburi" (Japanese: デンプシーロール破り)	Masato Jinbo	Kazuyuki Fudeyasu	October 12, 2013
105	3	"A Woman's Battle"; Transliteration: "Onna no Tatakai" (Japanese: 女の闘い)	Shun Kudō	Kazuyuki Fudeyasu	October 19, 2013
106	4	"The Goddess of Victory"; Transliteration: "Shōri no Megami" (Japanese: Alfie Ea)	Tatsuma Minamikawa	Atsuo Ishino	October 26, 2013
107	5	"100% Fake"; Transliteration: "100% no Feiku" (Japanese: 100%のフェイク)	Shun Kudō	Kazuyuki Fudeyasu	November 2, 2013
108	6	"The Distance Between Me and Glory"; Transliteration: "Eikō made no Kyori (Disutansu)" (Japanese: 栄光までの距離（ディスタンス）)	Akira Mano; Shun Kudō (assistant)	Atsuo Ishino	November 9, 2013
109	7	"Cheese Champion"; Transliteration: "Chīzu Chanpion" (Japanese: チーズチャンピオン)	Tadao Ōkubo; Shun Kudō (assistant)	Kazuyuki Fudeyasu	November 16, 2013
110	8	"The Mad Dog and The Red Wolf"; Transliteration: "Ueta Kyōken, Akai Ōkami" (Japanese: 飢えた狂犬、赤い狼)	Masami Hata; Shun Kudō (assistant)	Kazuyuki Fudeyasu	November 23, 2013
111	9	"A Savage Scenario"; Transliteration: "Akuma no Shinario" (Japanese: 悪魔のシナリオ)	Minoru Yamaoka	Atsuo Ishino	November 30, 2013
112	10	"The Face of Determination"; Transliteration: "Ketsudan no Kao" (Japanese: 決断の表情（カオ）)	Akira Mano; Shun Kudō (assistant)	Atsuo Ishino	December 7, 2013
113	11	"Fearless Challenger"; Transliteration: "Futeki na Chōsensha" (Japanese: 不敵な挑戦者)	Masami Hata; Shun Kudō (assistant)	Hideo Takayashiki	December 28, 2013
114	12	"The Anti-Dempsey Perfected"; Transliteration: "Kanzen Naru Denpushī Yaburi" (Japanese: 完全なるデンプシー破り)	Masami Hata; Shun Kudō (assistant)	Hideo Takayashiki	January 4, 2014
115	13	"A Fist that Picks You Up"; Transliteration: "Katsujin no Ken" (Japanese: 活人の拳)	Lee Jongh-yeon; Shun Kudō (assistant)	Hideo Takayashiki	January 4, 2014
116	14	"Empowering Words"; Transliteration: "Chikara no Deru Kotoba" (Japanese: 力の出る言葉)	Masayoshi Nishida	Atsuo Ishino	January 11, 2014
117	15	"A Storm Descends on Makunouchi Fishing Boat!"; Transliteration: "Fūun! Tsurifune Makunouchi!!" (Japanese: 風雲！釣り船幕之内！！)	Kim Dong-jun; Shun Kudō (assistant)	Atsuo Ishino	January 18, 2014
118	16	"Golden Eagle"; Transliteration: "Kogane no Washi (Gōruden Īguru)" (Japanese: 黄金の鷲（ゴールデンイーグル）)	Tadao Ōkubo; Shun Kudō (assistant)	Atsuo Ishino	January 25, 2014
119	17	"Eleki's Shocker and Papaya's Coconut"; Transliteration: "Dengeki Ereki to Kokonattsu Papaiya" (Japanese: デンゲキエレキとココナッツパパイヤ)	Masami Hata	Katsuya Ishida	February 1, 2014
120	18	"The Unfinished New Counter"; Transliteration: "Mikan no Shingata Kauntā" (Japanese: 未完の新型カウンター)	Kim Min-sun; Shun Kudō (assistant)	Atsuo Ishino	February 8, 2014
121	19	"Hawk vs. Eagle"; Transliteration: "Taka vs Washi" (Japanese: 鷹VS鷲)	Noriyuki Fukuda; Minoru Yamaoka	Tatsurō Inamoto	February 15, 2014
122	20	"A Lesson Never Forgotten"; Transliteration: "Wasurerarenai Oshie" (Japanese: 忘れられない教え)	Chiharu Satō; Shun Kudō (assistant)	Tatsurō Inamoto	February 22, 2014
123	21	"The End of the Death Match"; Transliteration: "Shitō no Hate ni" (Japanese: 死闘の果てに)	Masami Hata	Tatsurō Inamoto	March 1, 2014
124	22	"Flower of Hope"; Transliteration: "Kibō no Hana" (Japanese: 希望の花)	Kim Dong-jun; Shun Kudō (assistant)	Satoshi Nishimura	March 8, 2014
125	23	"The Courage to Live"; Transliteration: "Ikiru Yūki o" (Japanese: 生きる勇気を)	Kenji Takefuji; Shun Kudō (assistant)	Satoshi Nishimura	March 15, 2014
126	24	"Iron Fist"; Transliteration: "Tekken" (Japanese: 鉄拳)	Kim Min-sun	Satoshi Nishimura	March 22, 2014
127	25	"A Vow"; Transliteration: "Chikai" (Japanese: 誓い)	Satoshi Nishimura; Jun Shishido (assistant)	Satoshi Nishimura	March 29, 2014
