= Dreaming Machine =

Unfinished film directed by Satoshi Kon

- Directed by: Satoshi Kon
- Written by: Satoshi Kon
- Produced by: Masao Maruyama
- Cinematography: Kenji Itoso
- Edited by: Satoshi Kon
- Music by: Susumu Hirasawa
- Production companies: Madhouse; MAPPA
- Distributed by: Madhouse
- Country: Japan
- Language: Japanese

Dreaming Machine (夢みる機械, Yume Miru Kikai) is an unfinished Japanese anime fantasy-adventure film directed by Satoshi Kon. It would have been the director's fifth feature film. After Kon's death on August 24, 2010, production continued at Madhouse, where the team used Satoshi Kon's directorial tapes and notes to guide them to completing the film, though the main work such as storyboards and script was already complete. In August 2011, Madhouse founder Masao Maruyama revealed that production of the film had been cancelled due to lack of finances. Only 600 of 1,500 shots have been animated. Originally, Maruyama said there was intent to finish the film, despite the lack of finances. In August 2018, Maruyama revealed that the movie will not be completed or released in the foreseeable future, as there were no Japanese animation directors that could match Kon's level of ability, though he did not rule out the possibility of the project being revived in the future under a talented foreign director.

== Plot ==
In an interview with Anime News Network, Kon talked about the film, which would have centered on three characters, Ririco, Robin and King:

The title will be Yume-Miru Kikai. In English, it will be The Dream Machine. On the surface, it's going to be a fantasy-adventure targeted at younger audiences. However, it will also be a film that people who have seen our films up to this point will be able to enjoy. So it will be an adventure that even older audiences can appreciate. There will be no human characters in the film; only robots. It'll be like a "road movie" for robots.

— Satoshi Kon

== Characters ==
- Ririco: A smart, leaderly character reminiscent of Paprika.
- Robin: A small yellow robot. Main character. Growing from a boy to a young man by taking over parts from the same type of robot.
- King: A big, loyal, blue bot.

== Production ==
During Kon's battle with pancreatic cancer, the director expressed concern about the film being finished to Madhouse head Masao Maruyama. Maruyama assured Kon the film would be completed, no matter what. When Kon died, production was suspended indefinitely until further plans could be worked out over the film. On November 12, 2010, Madhouse Studios announced production resumed with character designer and chief animation director Yoshimi Itazu taking over as director of the film. At Otakon 2011, Maruyama revealed that production had been put on hold for financial reasons, but that he was dedicated to eventually be able to finish the film. According to Maruyama, about 600 shots out of 1500 had been animated at that point.

Susumu Hirasawa, whose song "Dreaming Machine" (from The Ghost in Science) is the source of the film's title, said: "I never received an official order from Kon. It's an unspoken agreement of sorts. There are scenes where he specifically requested a certain track to be used, but there are also many parts where there are no such directions, so it falls to me to choose the songs. This is a difficult task. But we must carry out his dying request, to complete this work, even without a director to question". On November 10, 2010, the album Hen-Gen-Ji-Zai, which features a rerecording of "Dreaming Machine" made two months before Kon's death, was released by Hirasawa's labels.

In 2011, Maruyama left Madhouse to found MAPPA in order to "make new shows that we wouldn't have been able to make at Madhouse." At Otakon 2012, he stated regarding Satoshi Kon's unfinished film, "Unfortunately, we still don't have enough money. My personal goal is to get it within five years after his passing. I'm still working hard towards that goal."

There was little new information about the film for several years afterward, but one of the project leads, Kenji Itoso, crowdfunded a separate film, Santa Company, on Kickstarter. In an interview in December 2014, Itoso said he felt comfortable taking a break from Dreaming Machine only because Satoshi Kon himself had urged him not to obsess too much about completing the project.

During a Q&A session at an Otakon 2015 panel, Maruyama commented that the biggest challenge behind production is finding someone comparable to Kon to direct it.

In August 2016, Maruyama said in an interview with Japanese anime/manga news site Akiba Souken:

For 4~5 years, I kept searching for a suitable director to complete Kon's work. Before his death, the storyboard and script, even part of the keyframe film was already completed. Then I thought, even if someone can mimic Kon's work, it would still be clear that it's only an imitation. For example, if Mamoru Hosoda took the director's position, the completed Dreaming Machine would still be a good piece of work. However, it's Hosoda's movie, not Kon's. Dreaming Machine should be Kon's movie, him and only him, not someone else's. That means we cannot and should not "compromise" only to finish it. I spent years, finally reached this hard conclusion. Instead, we should take only Kon's "original concept", and let somebody turn it into a feature film. By doing so, the completed piece could 100% be that person's work, and I'm OK with that. I also considered doing a documentary on Kon.

— Masao Maruyama

In August 2018, Maruyama revealed that the movie will not be completed and released in the foreseeable future, due to there being no directors in the Japanese animation industry that could match Kon's level of ability.

In March 2021, it was announced scenes from the film will be shown in the upcoming French documentary Satoshi Kon: la machine à rêves.

In the book "Animation! Real vs Dream" (アニメ！リアルvs．ドリーム), three cuts of a storyboard were made public. One cut consists of a background containing a group of buildings in a city that has been submerged and devastated in the distance, and two cuts depict the three main characters—Lirico, Robin, and King—walking towards the clouds crawling on the ground.
