= List of Di Gi Charat episodes =

This is a list of episodes from Di Gi Charat television, film and original video animation series.

== Di Gi Charat ==
No.	Title	Original release date
1	"Dejiko is Here-nyo"; Transliteration: "Dejiko ga kita-nyo" (Japanese: でじこが来たにょ)	November 29, 1999
Dejiko, Puchiko, and Gema arrive in Akihabara but the trio have nowhere to stay.
2	"Call me Rabi-en-Rose"; Transliteration: "Rabi-an-Rōzu to Yobinasai" (Japanese: ラ·ビ·アン·ローズと呼びなさい)	November 30, 1999
Dejiko's rival, Rabi-en-Rose, whose real name is Usada, appears.
3	"A Scary Store?"; Transliteration: "Kowai Omise?" (Japanese: こわいお店？)	December 1, 1999
A boy who is looking for trading cards helps out Rabi-en-Rose, though is frightened by the apparent scariness of the store.
4	"What the Heck is It?"; Transliteration: "Nan da Koitsu?" (Japanese: 何だこいつ？)	December 2, 1999
Dejiko, Gema, and Puchiko go on a picnic and meet a mysterious yellow bear in a box.
5	"Mister Longe"; Transliteration: "Ronge-san" (Japanese: ロン毛さん)	December 6, 1999
A good looking man enters the store, and comments on Dejiko's "nyo"s, Puchiko's "nyu"s, and Gema's "gema"s. He then shows great interest in Puchiko.
6	"Bukimi Boo"; Transliteration: "Bukimi Bū" (Japanese: ぶきみプー)	December 7, 1999
Two otaku, Takeshi and Yoshimi, find Dejiko's tail.
7	"Gema Gema Pushuuu"; Transliteration: "Gema Gema pushū" (Japanese: ゲマゲマプシュー)	December 8, 1999
Gema becomes large after Dejiko kicks him into the water.
8	"The Beam Won't Come Out-nyu..."; Transliteration: "Bīmu ga denai-nyu..." (Japanese: ビームがでないにゅ...)	December 9, 1999
Puchiko knows she has the potential to use her Eye Beam but Dejiko has something that Puchiko is missing in her efforts to use it.
9	"Romantic in a Way"; Transliteration: "Sorenari ni Romanchikku" (Japanese: それなりにロマンチック)	December 13, 1999
Minagawa is saved from sickness from a pre-henshin form Rabi-en-rose who tells him her history.
10	"Imposter Dejiko Appears!"; Transliteration: "Nise Dejiko Arawaru!" (Japanese: ニセでじこ現る！)	December 14, 1999
Minagawa is robbed and identifies the perpetrator as Dejiko.
11	"Warm Fluffy Rice-nyo"; Transliteration: "Hoka Hoka Gohan" (Japanese: ホカホカごはん)	December 15, 1999
Dejiko and Puchiko dream about rice.
12	"Monsters and Stuff Appear!"; Transliteration: "Kaijū Sonota Arawaru" (Japanese: 怪獣その他現る！)	December 16, 1999
A monster attacks the city.
13	"I'm Possessed-nyo"; Transliteration: "Toritsuka Reta-nyo" (Japanese: とりつかれたにょ〜)	December 20, 1999
Minagawa comes over to help rid Dejiko of a clam spirit that is possessing her.
14	"Abarenbou Comes to Town"; Transliteration: "Abarenbō ga yattekita" (Japanese: 暴れん坊がやってきた)	December 21, 1999
A hooligan named Abarenbou visits Gamers and causes a commotion.
15	"PARTY NIGHT"	December 22, 1999
This episode consists entirely of a music video with the song "Party Night".
16	"Usada Explodes"; Transliteration: "Usada Daibakuhatsu" (Japanese: うさだ大爆発)	December 23, 1999
Dejiko gives Usada a dangerous Christmas cake in order to be rid of her.

== Di Gi Charat - Summer Special 2000 ==
No.	Original release date
1	August 22, 2000
Piyoko is Here-nyo: Piyoko arrives on Earth. It's the Black Gamers-nyo: Black Gamers opens across the street and steals Gamers' customers away.
2	August 23, 2000
Abarenbou Strikes Back: Piyoko, annoyed by summer heat and by Dejiko, goes to Gamers in order to get revenge on Dejiko. A Summer Bug: A bug, Paya Paya, infiltrates Gamers to turn it into a bug lover's store.

== Di Gi Charat - Christmas Special ==
No.	Title	Original release date
1	"Gorgeous-nyo"; Transliteration: "Gojasu-nyo" (Japanese: ゴ〜ジャスにょ〜)	December 16, 2000
Dejiko and everyone from Akihabara is invited to a cruise. They find out it was the Black Gema Gema gang who invited them. After a showdown between Dejiko and Piyoko, a present for Dejiko arrives from the sky from her parents. Piyoko becomes depressed because she never received presents before.

== Di Gi Charat - Ohanami Special ==
No.	Title	Original release date
1	"Evil Settles in" Transliteration: "Sumitsuku Aku" (Japanese: スミツクアク)	April 6, 2001
Piyoko and the Black Gema Gema gang invade Dejiko and Puchiko's room.
2	"Sakura Sakura"; Transliteration: "Sakura Sakura" (Japanese: さくら さくら)	April 6, 2001
Everyone gathers under a sakura tree for a picnic.
3	"Long Haired Big Brother-nyu"; Transliteration: "Ke naga Onii-san-nyu" (Japanese: 毛長お兄さんにゅ)	April 6, 2001
Puchiko goes to preschool.
4	"Don't Call Me Rabi-en-Rose"; Transliteration: "Rabi-an-Rōzu to Yobidanai de" (Japanese: ラ·ビ·アンローズと呼ばないで)	April 6, 2001
Rabi-en-Rose and Minagawa begin attending the same class and have to cure Dejiko of a disease that makes her act politely.

== Di Gi Charat - Natsuyasumi Special ==
No.	Original release date
1	August 2, 2001
Dejiko in America 1: Everyone ends up in the United States and they all meet Rod Young. Dejiko in America 2: Dejiko wants to travel to Hollywood to become a star while Rabi-en-Rose seeks her parents out.
2	August 3, 2001
DePuRaPyoGeBou Debut: Everyone helps start a band called DePuRaPyoGeBou. The name consists of the first syllable of everyone's names. Is Anyone Here-nyo?: Everyone goes to the Gamers' rest home in the forest and one by one they start to disappear mysteriously.

== Di Gi Charat - Tsuyu Special ==
No.	Original release date
1	August 25, 2001
Gema's Abode: Dejiko, Puchiko, and Usada have found themselves in what appears to be a black hole after looking for Gema. Tsusodeshiu Theater Team (Nice!): Usada dreams of becoming an idol and the school drama club might be a big help!

== Di Gi Charat Theater - Leave it to Piyoko-pyo! ==
No.	Title	Original release date
1	"Piyoko's Planet-pyo"; Transliteration: "Piyoko no Hoshi-pyo" (Japanese: ぴよこの星ぴょ)	2003
Piyoko and the rest of the Black Gema Gema Gang are starving on planet Analogue. Coo finds food, but the owner wants it back.
2	"We're Going to Go to Earth-pyo"; Transliteration: "Chikyū wo Mezasu-pyo" (Japanese: 地球を目指すぴょ)	2003
The Black Gema Gema gang plans to go to earth to kidnap Dejiko for ransom.
3	"Piyoko is Here-pyo"; Transliteration: "Piyoko ga Kita-pyo" (Japanese: ぴよこが来たぴょ)	2003
Piyoko arrives on earth. She follows Dejiko to the Gamers store where she introduces herself.
4	"Who's Amaenbou-pyo?"; Transliteration: "Amaenbō Tte Dare-pyo?" (Japanese: あまえん坊ってダレぴょ？)	2003
Rik introduces Amaenbou which he found on the street. With its cute and demanding attitude, customers buy out everything in the store.
5	"Let's All Draw-pyo"; Transliteration: "Minna De Oekaki-pyo" (Japanese: みんなでお絵かきぴょ)	2003
Everyone draws each other portrait. A Piyoko, Dejiko, and Gema drawing song is sung.
6	"Coo is a Doctor-pyo"; Transliteration: "Kū mo Oisha-san-pyo" (Japanese: クウもお医者さんぴょ)	2003
Coo tells the story about how he became a doctor.
7	"Blue Red Green-pyo"; Transliteration: "Ao Aka Midori-pyo" (Japanese: あおあかみどりぴょ)	2003
Pyoko enters a tent and finds herself in a blue world. Rik, Ky, and Coo enter the tent to find a red world. Dejiko, Puchiko, Rabi~en~Rose, and Gema enter the tent and find themselves in a green world.
8	"Big Sister Dejiko-pyo"; Transliteration: "Dejiko Onē-chan-pyo" (Japanese: でじこおねえちゃんぴょ)	2003
Piyoko brings Dejiko to the Black Gema Gema gang's hideout. Dejiko demands sweets and decides not to leave.
