= Peter Mak =

Hong Kong film director and actor (1957–2023)

Peter Mak (1957 – 26 March 2023) was a Hong Kong film director and actor. The films he directed include The Wicked City, All Night Long, and Enemy Shadow. As an actor he appeared in Shu zhi suo zhi , Happy Sixteen, Lai Shi, China's Last Eunuch, Tiger Cage, and Twin Dragons.

== Background ==
Peter Mak, or Mak Tai-kit (Chinese: 麦大杰), was born in Saigon, South Vietnam in 1957. When he was a boy he regularly went to the cinema. During the Vietnam War his family moved to Hong Kong.

== Actor ==
Mak had a main role in David Lai's Lonely Fifteen which was released in 1982. The film also starred Becky Lam, Irene Wan, So Pui-fong, Leung Mei-king. The following year, he had a role in Shu zhi suo zhi which was directed by Kin-Kwok Lai. In 1987, he had a part in Jacob Cheung's Lai Shi, China's Last Eunuch.

Mak appeared in Twin Dragons which was directed by Ringo Lam and Hark Tsui.

== Director ==
=== 1980s ===
Mak both directed and acted in the 1986 horror film, Loves of the Living Dead aka Heaven Wife, Hell Wife which was released in 1986. The supernatural comedy also starred Mark Cheng, Ann Bridgewater and Charine Chan. He directed Sir, Tell Me Why which was released the following year. The film is about a teacher who has to deal with problem students and overcome the problems and difficulties associated with them. The film starred Siu Hung-Mui, Chang Shih, Tou Chung-hua, Tou Chung-kang, and Yang Chieh-mei.

=== 1990s ===
Mak directed The Wicked City which was released in 1992. The Kong horror/fantasy was based on an animated film by Yoshiaki Kawajiri. Staying close to the original story line, it was about special agents fighting demons from a parallel dimension. It starred Jacky Cheung, Leon Lai and Tatsuya Nakadai.

Mak directed Enemy Shadow which was released in 1995. The film which starred Jade Leung was a tale about a rookie cop who witnessed her boyfriend murdered by bank robbers. She suffers from guilt as a result of not doing anything when the tragedy took place.

== Death ==
Mak died on 26 March 2023, at the age of 66.

== Filmography ==
ActorFilm
Title	Role	Director	Year	Notes #
Shu zhi suo zhi		Kin-Kwok Lai	1983	As Tai Kit Mak
Kuang qing		David Lai; Kôyû Ohara	1983	As Tai Kit Mak
Tian ling ling, di ling ling	Kang Yo Wei	Peter Mak	1986	As Peter Mak
Split of the Spirit		Fred Tan	1987	As Tai Kit Mak
Lai Shi, China's Last Eunuch		Jacob Cheung	1998	As Tai Kit Mak
Tiger Cage	Policeman	Woo-Ping Yuen	1988	As Tai Kit Mak
Pretty Ghost		Teddy Chan	1991	As Tai Kit Mak
Twin Dragons		Ringo Lam; Hark Tsui	1992	As Tai Kit Mak

DirectorFilm
Title	Year	Notes #
The Loser, the Hero	1985	As Peter Mak
Tian ling ling, di ling ling	1986	As Peter Mak
Sir, Tell Me Why	1987	As Tai Kit Mak
Ye feng kuang	1989	As Tai Kit Mak
Xiao xin jian die	1990	As As Tai Kit Mak
Wicked City	1992	As Peter Mak
Enemy Shadow	1995	As Tai Kit Mak; Co-directed with Tung-Chuen Chan

DirectorMini series
Title	Year	Notes #
Lion Dance	2017	As Tai Kit Mak; Co-directed with Tsu-Jun Lang
