= Toshi (given name) =

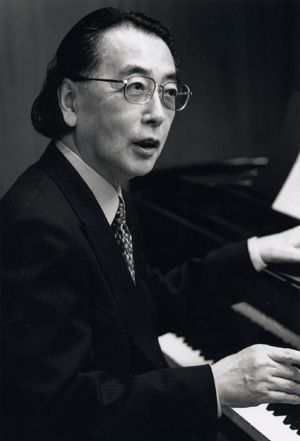
- Toshi Ichiyanagi (1933–2022), Japanese composer
- Pronunciation: toɕi (IPA)
- Gender: Male

Origin
- Origin: Japanese
- Meaning: Different meanings depending on the kanji used

Other names
- Alternative spelling: Tosi (Kunrei-shiki) Tosi (Nihon-shiki) Toshi (Hepburn)

Toshi is a masculine Japanese given name. It is also a nickname or shortening of several longer names.

== Written forms ==
Toshi can be expressed with several kanji characters. Some examples:

- 敏, "agile"
- 俊, "talented"
- 利, "benefit"
- 年, "year"
- 慧, "wise"

The name can also be written in hiragana とし or katakana トシ.

== Notable people with the name ==
- Toshi Fukumasu (福益 敏; born 1946), Japanese rower.
- Toshi Ichiyanagi (一柳 慧; 1933–2022), Japanese composer.
- Toshi Sano (佐野 敏), Japanese rower.
- Toshi Yano (矢野 俊), American musician.

== Other people ==
- Toshi Reagon (born 1964), American female folk/blues musician
- Toshi Sabri, Indian singer and composer
- Toshi Seeger (1922–2013), American filmmaker, producer and environmental activist
- Toshi Sinha, Indian voice actress

== Fictional characters ==
- Toshi (トシ), a character in the film Moon Child
- Toshi Tsukikage (月影 トシ), a character in the anime series Soar High! Isami
- Toshi Yoshida (トシ・ヨシダ), a character in the television series American Dad!

== See also ==
- Tōshi Yoshida (吉田 遠志; 1911-1995), Japanese printmaker
