= The Wicked City (Singer novel) =

Novel by Isaac Bashevis Singer

- First English-language edition publ. Farrar, Straus and Giroux, 1972
- Author: Isaac Bashevis Singer
- Language: Yiddish
- Publication date: 1972
- Publication place: United States
- Media type: Print

The Wicked City is a novel for children by Isaac Bashevis Singer. Originally written in Yiddish, it was published in English in 1972. The book is a retelling of the story of Lot and the people of Sodom from the Bible, though Singer omits certain elements of the Bible story.
