= The Wicked City (1992 film) =

1992 Hong Kong film by Peter Mak

- Film poster for The Wicked City
- Traditional Chinese: 妖獸都市
- Cantonese: Yíu sau dōu síh
- Directed by: Peter Mak
- Written by: Tsui Hark; Roy Szeto
- Story by: Hideyuki Kikuchi
- Based on: Wicked City
- Produced by: Tsui Hark
- Starring: Jacky Cheung; Leon Lai; Michelle Reis; Tatsuya Nakadai
- Cinematography: Joe Chan
- Music by: Richard Yuen
- Production company: Film Workshop
- Release date: 27 November 1992 (Hong Kong)
- Running time: 96 minutes
- Country: Hong Kong
- Language: Cantonese
- Box office: $10,778,465

The Wicked City (Chinese: 妖獸都市; Cantonese Yale: Yíu sau dōu síh) is a 1992 science fiction film directed by Peter Mak and produced by Tsui Hark. It is a live-action film adaptation of the Japanese anime of the same name, which in turn is based on the first novel of the series of the same name by Hideyuki Kikuchi. The film stars Jacky Cheung, Leon Lai, Yuen Woo-ping, Roy Cheung, Tatsuya Nakadai, Michelle Reis, and Carman Lee. Michelle Reis said that Tsui Hark actually directed many scenes himself. It tells fictional story of conflicts and relationship between demon-like creatures and humans in 1990s' Hong Kong. The film was one of the most popular Tsui Hark productions in the USA and Europe, and still plays in festivals and midnight screenings around the USA and Europe.

== Plot ==
The story takes place in Hong Kong in a conflict between worlds of Humans and "Rapters" ("Reptoids" in some dubbed versions) before the handover. A special police unit in the city are investigating a mysterious drug named "Happiness". Taki, one of the policemen, meets his old lover Windy, who is a rapter and now a mistress of a powerful old rapter named Daishu. Taki and other special police members track down and fight Daishu, but later find that he hoped to coexist with humans. The son of Daishu, Shudo, is the mastermind. In the end Shudo is defeated, but Daishu and Taki's friends die, too. Windy leaves alone.

The film begins with the sun setting in Tokyo. Unknown to most people, there is the demonic "Rapter World" in conflict with human world. Rapters shift their shapes and infiltrate human world. Taki (or "Leung", played by Leon Lai) is a sales of a Hong Kong import/export company, but that is only his cover. He reveals his real occupation when he hunts down a seductive spider-like rapter in Tokyo. Ken saved his life when Taki ran out of bullets. Taki belongs to the Anti-Rapter Special Police. One day he is transferred back to Hong Kong. The 1997 transfer of Hong Kong is near, Anti-Rapter Special Police Headquarter transferred many agents from Hong Kong to the United Kingdom. This is a chaotic period when Hong Kong is most vulnerable to rapters. That's why Taki is sent to Hong Kong to help.

Also in the unit is Taki's buddy Ken Kai (or "Ying", Jacky Cheung). Being the son of a human father and a Rapter mother, Ken faces frequent distrust and discrimination amongst his fellow work colleagues due to being half human. Besides Taki, Orchid ("Loh", by Carman Lee) is the only one in the unit on his side. When Ken felt Taki did not trust him well enough, Taki tells him about his past relationship with a rapter, Windy ("Gaye", Michelle Reis). Taki was ordered to arrest Windy and was critically injured by the other rapters who were hunting her down. Windy healed him out of goodwill, and escaped to the human world in hope for peace. Windy eventually became Taki's informant against the raptors, and the two become romantically bound. However, Taki, fearing he will turn out similar to Ken's father, ran away.

Once Taki is back in Hong Kong from Tokyo, the unit begins investigation on an addictive and harmful performance-enhancing drug named "Happiness". The emotionless leader of the police unit Sergeant Kayama ("Commander", Yuen Woo-ping) suspects that Happiness is imported from the Rapter World by a tycoon named Daishu ("Yuen", Tatsuya Nakadai). He orders Taki and Ken to slip into Daishu's mysterious 150th birthday party. There Taki meets his former lover ("Gaye", Michelle Reis), who is now a mistress of Daishu. On the other hand, Daishu and his raptor staffs are having a meeting, because they don't know who is importing Happiness the drug either. The staffs are nervous, but Daishu persuades them to control humans' economy to bargain with humans.

The meeting is attacked by two rapter killers. All other staff are killed, Daishu is injured, and Windy is injected with Happiness, however, they escape from killers and police. Sergeant Kayama suspects a traitor in the unit. He suspends Ken from duty and says he has a suspicious origin. Knowing rapters would access energy to recover, Sergeant Kayama pays attention to electricity consumption over districts and locates the rapters in a power plant. Taki enters the plant, lets Windy escape but catches Daishu. Windy seeks help from Daishu's son Shudo ("Gwei", Roy Cheung). Shudo orders her loyalty to him and sexual intercourse happens between the two. Windy is sent to hurt Taki with the poison and later she too is caught by police, as she is also framed by Shudo.

Daishu hopes to coexist with humans, since worlds of rapters and humans are together facing the energy crisis. Further more, he hopes to learn human emotions. His son Shudo is the mastermind who imports Happiness and attacks Daishu. Shudo also trades with Orchid, the real traitor in the police unit. Orchid doesn't care about either humans or rapters, she only wants to make money and leave the city to survive the energy crisis. With help of Windy, Taki and Ken find out the truth, but Windy falls into hands of Shudo. They rescue Daishu from the unit and join forces to fight Shudo and his two killers. On the other hand, Sergeant Kayama's announcement to suspend Ken is a trap to lure out the real traitor. Orchid is caught by Sergeant Kayama after she sabotaged the police unit's facility. Sergeant Kayama kills Orchid in cold blood, and leads a team to go after Taki. Because of Orchid's sabotage, an artificial magnetic field that protects Hong Kong is turned off, and Shudo is now able to turn the time backward to an age when humans are easy to control. Taki and Ken collaborate with Daishu to stop Shudo.

After night battles, Shudo's killers are eliminated by Daishu, but Ken under Shudo's influence turns into a rapter and then is injured by Sergeant Kayama's team. Windy is dying from the effect of Happiness. Daishu returns to his rapter form to battle Shudo. Daishu says it is because only a rapter can kill his own son. Shudo is happy for his father finally turns back to a rapter. Later they jump on an aeroplane and fight above Hong Kong. Daishu's power is weakened by age, but he dives into Shudo's shadow and defeats him with the power of his shadow. Shudo takes Taki as hostage, as he knows human emotion is his father's weakness. As an act to protect Taki, Windy stabs Ken in the stomach. At the same time Ken regains human consciousness. He gives his blood to Windy so that Windy is able to overcome Happiness and rescue Taki from Shudo.

In the end Shudo is killed. Sergeant Kayama's team put the aircraft on the tip of Bank of China Tower. With remorse of failing to prove his humanity, Ken dies in arms of Sergeant Kayama.

Weighting his duty and emotion, Taki frees Daishu and Windy from hands of special police, as he knows Daishu is the one who can protect Windy well. Taki pretends the other police will come down to arrest them and Windy claims she will not appear in the city again, making Taki turning against his missions. As the two turn around, a hurt Taki sadly remarks: "I don't mind, I don't mind at all...". Taki meets a sad Sergeant Kayama and says Kayama may have become too emotional to lead the unit.

On a car, Daishu dies for depletion of energy, hoping humans do not need any more "happiness", leaving only Windy drives away from the city alone at dawn.

== Special effects ==
Andrew Lau and Joe Chan are the photographers of this film. They featured the film with darkness from many night scenes and dark interior scenes. They used coloured lighting in these scenes, especially for supernatural combat sequences. The filmmakers also used black light on Shudo's special make-up and creature costume to make him glow in the darkness. Some jumping and flying effects were done with Wire fu (wire work). Monster transformations and abilities were done with simple optical effects such as double exposure and step frame printing (Morton, 2001).
