= Wicked City (novel series) =

Novel series by Hideyuki Kikuchi

- The cover to the original Japanese version of the first book in the series, Wicked City: Black Guard.
- Author: Hideyuki Kikuchi
- Country: Japan
- Language: Japanese
- Genre: Science fantasy Erotic horror Thriller
- Publisher: Tokuma Shoten
- Published: 1985–2016
- Media type: Print (paperback)

Wicked City (Japanese: 妖獣都市, Hepburn: Yōjū Toshi; lit. Supernatural Beast City) is a series of novels written by Hideyuki Kikuchi and published by Tokuma Shoten. Between 2009 and 2010, the first three books in the series were published by Tor/Seven Seas in English. The first book served as the basis for an anime film and live-action film of the same name.

== List of books ==
No.	Title	Original release date	English release date
1	Wicked City: Black Guard 妖獣都市, Yōjū Toshi	July 1985; 978-4191531086	September 29, 2009; 978-0765323309
2	Wicked City: The Other Side 妖獣都市2, Yōjū Toshi 2	February 1986; 978-4191532106	June 8, 2010; 978-0765323316
3	Wicked City: The Scarlet Clan 妖獣都市3, Yōjū Toshi 3	September 1986; 978-4191533004	November 9, 2010; 978-0765323323
4	The Misfortune Mad Demon 凶戦鬼, Kyo Sen Oni	December 1987; 978-4191535664	—
5	Wicked City New York 妖獣都市〈ニューヨーク魔界戦〉, Yōjū Toshi Nyuyoku Makai Sen	June 1990; 978-4191542280	—
6	Wicked City: Devil Beast Child 妖獣都市 魔獣児, Yōjū Toshi Majuuji	June 2000; 978-4198504984	—
7	Wicked City: Lantern Demon 妖獣都市 雪洞鬼, Yōjū Toshi Bonbori Oni	January 2002; 978-4198505493	—
8	Wicked City: The Devil King's Eye 妖獣都市 魔王眼, Yōjū Toshi Mao Me	January 2003; 978-4198505851	—
9	Wicked City Umishiki 妖獣都市 海死記, Yōjū Toshi Umishiki	December 2003; 978-4198506193	—
10	Wicked City: Black Angel 妖獣都市 黒天使, Yōjū Toshi Kuro Tenshi	June 2008; 978-4198507893	—
11	Wicked City: Evil Mandala 妖獣都市 邪体曼荼羅, Yōjū Toshi Yokoshima-tai Mandara	October 2016; 978-4620210162	—

== Adaptations ==
=== Animated film ===
Wicked City (妖獣都市) is a horror adventure anime film produced by Madhouse. It was directed, character designed, and drawn by Yoshiaki Kawajiri.

=== Live-action film ===
The Wicked City (妖獣都市〜香港魔界篇〜) was released in 1992. It was produced by Tsui Hark in Hong Kong.
