= Madhouse, Inc. =

Japanese animation studio

- Native name: 株式会社マッドハウス
- Romanized name: Kabushiki-gaisha Maddohausu
- Type: Kabushiki-gaisha
- Industry: Animation studio
- Founded: October 17, 1972; 54 years ago
- Founders: Masao Maruyama; Osamu Dezaki; Yoshiaki Kawajiri
- Headquarters: Honchō, Nakano, Tokyo, Japan
- Key people: Sanae Tashiro (president and CEO)
- Owner: Nippon Television Network Corporation (96.06%); Sony Pictures (3.94%)
- Number of employees: 70 (including contractors)
- Subsidiaries: Madbox Co., Ltd.
- Website: madhouse.co.jp

Madhouse, Inc. (Note: Japanese: 株式会社マッドハウス, Hepburn: Kabushiki-gaisha Maddohausu) is a Japanese animation studio founded in 1972 by ex–Mushi Pro staff, including Masao Maruyama, Osamu Dezaki, and Yoshiaki Kawajiri.

Madhouse has created and helped produce many well-known shows, OVAs and films, starting with TV anime series Ace o Nerae! (produced by Tokyo Movie Shinsha) in 1973, and including Wicked City, Ninja Scroll, Perfect Blue, Vampire Hunter D: Bloodlust, Trigun, Di Gi Charat, Black Lagoon, Death Note, Chi's Sweet Home, Paprika, Parasyte: The Maxim, the first season of One-Punch Man, the second adaptation of Hunter × Hunter, Overlord, and Frieren: Beyond Journey's End. Unlike other studios founded at this time such as AIC and J.C.Staff, their strength was and is primarily in TV shows and theatrical features. Expanding from the initial Mushi Pro staff, Madhouse recruited important directors such as Morio Asaka, Masayuki Kojima, and Satoshi Kon during the 1990s. Their staff roster expanded in the 2000s to include Mamoru Hosoda, Takeshi Koike, and Mitsuo Iso, as well as many younger television directors.

The studio often collaborates with known manga artists, including Naoki Urasawa and Clamp. Madhouse produced adaptations of Urasawa's Yawara!, Master Keaton, and Monster, with Masayuki Kojima helming the latter two. The company has animated a number of CLAMP's titles, including Tokyo Babylon, two versions of X (a theatrical movie and a TV series), Cardcaptor Sakura and its sequel Clear Card, and Chobits. In the 2000s and 2010s, Madhouse and its subsidiaries, Madbox Co., Ltd and South Korea–based DR Movie, animated for various companies, including Imagi Animation Studios, Warner Bros. Animation, Marvel Animation, Studio Ghibli, TMS Entertainment, Production I.G, Sunrise, Pierrot, DNA Productions, Hanna-Barbera, Film Roman, Nickelodeon Animation Studios, Capcom, and HBO, among others.

== History ==
Madhouse was established in 1972 by ex–Mushi Production animators, including Masao Maruyama, Osamu Dezaki, and Yoshiaki Kawajiri, with funding from Yutaka Fujioka, the founder of Tokyo Movie, and co-produced its earliest series with Tokyo Movie. In February 2004, Madhouse became a subsidiary of Index Corporation. On February 8, 2011, Nippon TV became Madhouse's primary stockholder (replacing Index Corporation), via a third-party allocation of new shares. NTV bought 128,667 new shares (each ¥7,772) issued by Madhouse for ¥999,999,924 total (about $12.4 million), raising its stake in the company from 10.4% to 84.5%. Index Corporation's stake in Madhouse fell from 60.91% to 10.54%. In January 2012, Madhouse announced their acquisition of the animation rights to the Peanuts comic strip. In March 2014, NTV bought all the shares belonging to Index Corporation, increasing its stake in Madhouse to 95%.

=== Representative staff ===
==== Current ====
- Sanae Tashiro (Seventh president and CEO, 2021–)
- Yuuzou Kuwahara (Board member, 2024–)
- Toshiya Gotou (Board member, 2024–)
- Hidetoshi Tomonari (Auditor, 2024–)

==== Former ====
- Yasuo Oda (First president and CEO, 1972–1980)
- Masao Maruyama (Second president and CEO, 1980–2000; COO, 2000–2011)
- Jungoo Murata (Third president and CEO, 2000–2009)
- Masami Ochiai (Fourth president and CEO, 2010–2011)
- Hiroyuki Okada (Fifth president and CEO, 2011–2015)
- Masahiro Takahashi (Sixth president and CEO, 2015–2020; also chairman of the board)
- Akira Shinohara (Managing director, ?–2024)
- Tsuneo Takayama (Board member)
- Kako Kuwahara (Board member, ?–2024)
- Hitoshi Nishioka (Board member, ?–2024)

== Business ==
The studio employs approximately 70 employees, with employment levels varying depending on the number of productions currently underway. Additionally, the company has invested in the animation studio DR Movie. Madhouse has a subsidiary, Madbox Co., Ltd., that mainly focuses on computer graphics.

== Works ==
=== Television ===
==== 1979–2000 ====
- The Adventures of Marco Polo (1979–1980, co-animated with MK)
- Galactic Patrol Lensman (1984–1985, co-animated with MK)
- Yawara! (1989–1992)
- DNA² (1994, co-animated with Studio Deen)
- Azuki-chan (1995–1998)
- Trigun (1998)
- Cardcaptor Sakura (1998–2000)
- Master Keaton (1998–2000)
- Bomberman B-Daman Bakugaiden (1998–1999)
- Super Doll Licca-chan (1998–1999)
- Pet Shop of Horrors (1999)
- Jubei-chan: The Secret of the Lovely Eyepatch (1999)
- Di Gi Charat (1999–2001)
- Reign: The Conqueror (1999)
- Magic User's Club (1999)
- Bomberman B-Daman Bakugaiden V (1999–2000)

==== 2000s ====
- Boogiepop Phantom (2000)
- Carried by the Wind: Tsukikage Ran (2000)
- Hidamari no Ki (2000)
- Sakura Wars (2000)
- Hajime no Ippo: The Fighting! (2000–2002)
- Beyblade (2001)
- Galaxy Angel (2001–2004)
- Shingu: Secret of the Stellar Wars (2001)
- Chance Pop Session (2001)
- Magical Meow Meow Taruto (2001)
- X (2001–2002)
- Aquarian Age: Sign for Evolution (2002)
- Chobits (2002)
- Magical Shopping Arcade Abenobashi (2002)
- Pita-Ten (2002)
- Dragon Drive (2002–2003)
- Hanada Shōnen Shi (2002–2003)
- Panyo Panyo Di Gi Charat (2002)
- Rizelmine (2002, co-animated with IMAGIN)
- Mirage of Blaze (2002)
- Ninja Scroll: The Series (2003)
- Texhnolyze (2003)
- Gungrave (2003–2004)
- Gunslinger Girl (2003–2004)
- Uninhabited Planet Survive! (2003–2004, co-animated with Telecom Animation Film)
- Di Gi Charat Nyo! (2003–2004)
- Gokusen (2004)
- Jubei-chan: The Counter Attack of Siberia Yagyu (2004)
- Paranoia Agent (2004)
- Tenjho Tenge (2004)
- Monster (2004–2005)
- BECK: Mongolian Chop Squad (2004–2005)
- Black Jack (2004–2006)
- Sweet Valerian (2004)
- Strawberry 100% (2005)
- Akagi (2005–2006)
- Paradise Kiss (2005)
- Oku-sama wa Joshi Kōsei (2005)
- Kiba (2006–2007)
- Strawberry Panic! (2006)
- NANA (2006–2007)
- The Story of Saiunkoku (2006–2008)
- Black Lagoon (2006)
- Yume Tsukai (2006)
- Otogi-Jūshi Akazukin (2006–2007)
- Kemonozume (2006)
- Death Note (2006–2007)
- Tokyo Tribe 2 (2006–2007)
- Claymore (2007)
- Oh! Edo Rocket (2007)
- Princess Resurrection (2007)
- Dennō Coil (2007)
- Devil May Cry: The Animated Series (2007)
- Shigurui (2007)
- Gyakkyō Burai Kaiji (2007–2008)
- Neuro: Supernatural Detective (2007–2008)
- Mokke (2007–2008)
- MapleStory (2007–2008)
- Ani*Kuri15 (animated sequence) (2007–2008)
- Chi's Sweet Home (2008–2009)
- Allison & Lillia (2008)
- Kamen no Maid Guy (2008)
- Top Secret ~The Revelation~ (2008)
- Kaiba (2008)
- Ultraviolet: Code 044 (2008)
- Casshern Sins (2008–2009)
- Kurozuka (2008)
- Mōryō no Hako (2008)
- One Outs (2008–2009)
- Stitch! (2008–2010)
- Chaos;Head (2008)
- Hajime no Ippo: New Challenger (2009)
- Rideback (2009)
- Sōten Kōro (2009)
- Needless (2009)
- Kobato (2009–2010)
- Redline (2009)
- Aoi Bungaku (2009)

==== 2010s ====
- Rainbow: Nisha Rokubō no Shichinin (2010)
- The Tatami Galaxy (2010)
- Highschool of the Dead (2010)
- Marvel Anime (2010–2011)
- Gyakkyō Burai Kaiji: Hakairoku-hen (2011)
- Hunter × Hunter (2011–2014)
- Chihayafuru (2011–2020)
- The Ambition of Oda Nobuna (2012, co-animated with Studio Gokumi)
- Btooom! (2012)
- Photo Kano (2013)
- Sunday Without God (2013)
- Hajime no Ippo: Rising (2013–2014, co-animated with MAPPA)
- Ace of Diamond (2013–2016, co-animated with Production I.G)
- Magical Warfare (2014)
- The Irregular at Magic High School (2014)
- No Game No Life (2014)
- Hanayamata (2014)
- Parasyte -the maxim- (2014–2015)
- Death Parade (2015)
- My Love Story!! (2015)
- Overlord (2015)
- One-Punch Man (2015)
- Prince of Stride: Alternative (2016)
- Alderamin on the Sky (2016)
- All Out!! (2016–2017, co-animated with TMS Entertainment)
- ACCA: 13-Territory Inspection Dept. (2017)
- Marvel Future Avengers (2017)
- Overlord II (2018)
- A Place Further than the Universe (2018)
- Overlord III (2018)
- Cardcaptor Sakura: Clear Card (2018)
- Okko's Inn (2018)
- Mr. Tonegawa: Middle Management Blues (2018)
- Boogiepop and Others (2019)
- Ace of Diamond Act II (2019–2020)
- Afterlost (2019)
- No Guns Life (2019–2020)

==== 2020s ====
- Sonny Boy (2021)
- The Vampire Dies in No Time (2021–2023)
- Takt Op. Destiny (2021, co-animated with MAPPA)
- Overlord IV (2022)
- Police in a Pod (2022)
- Bibliophile Princess (2022)
- My Love Story with Yamada-kun at Lv999 (2023)
- The Gene of AI (2023)
- Frieren: Beyond Journey's End (2023–2024)
- Trillion Game (2024–2025)
- Orb: On the Movements of the Earth (2024–2025)
- The Dinner Table Detective (2025)
- Wandance (2025, co-animated with Cyclone Graphics)
- Frieren: Beyond Journey's End 2nd Season (2026)
- Liar Game (2026)
- Scenes from Awajima (2026)
- Frieren: Beyond Journey's End 3rd Season (2027)

=== Television specials ===
- Natsufuku no Shōjo-tachi (August 7, 1988)
- Hiroshima ni Ichiban Densha ga Hashitta (August 6, 1993)
- Yawara! Special - Zutto Kimi no Koto ga (July 19, 1996)
- Di Gi Charat - Summer Special 2000 (August 22, 2000 – August 23, 2000)
- Di Gi Charat - Christmas Special (December 16, 2000)
- Di Gi Charat - Ohanami Special (April 6, 2001)
- Di Gi Charat - Natsuyasumi Special (August 2, 2001 – August 3, 2001)
- Di Gi Charat - Tsuyu Special (August 25, 2001)
- Hajime no Ippo - Champion Road (June 25, 2003)
- A Spirit of the Sun (September 17 – 18, 2006)
- Ani*Kuri 15 (May 7 – December 10, 2007, animated two of the fifteen segments, "Sancha (The Aromatic Tea) Blues" and "Good Morning", respectively)
- Death Note: Relight - Visions of a God (August 31, 2007)
- Death Note: Relight 2 - L's Successors (August 22, 2008)
- Megumi to Taiyō: Kajū Gummi Tweet Love Story (May 11, 2011)
- Megumi to Taiyō II: Kajū Gummi Tweet Mystery (February 24, 2012, co-animated with MAPPA)
- Megumi to Taiyō III: Kajū Gummi Tweet Fantasy (June 12, 2012, co-animated with MAPPA)
- Stitch and the Planet of Sand (June 16, 2012)
- Stitch! Perfect Memory (August 7, 2015)
- Transformers 40th Anniversary Special Movie (September 12, 2024) (co-production with Takara Tomy, Hasbro, Production I.G., Studio Trigger, Studio Colorido, Studio Kai and Production +h)

=== Film ===
Madhouse's early theatrical work included assistance on the Barefoot Gen films, and Lensman, an anime movie based on the space opera series by pulp science fiction author E.E. "Doc" Smith.

In the late 1980s and early 1990s, director Yoshiaki Kawajiri produced a string of action films including Wicked City, Demon City Shinjuku, and Ninja Scroll.

In the late 1990s, the studio aimed at a younger female audience with Morio Asaka's two Cardcaptor Sakura films, based on the popular television series.

In the early 2000s, an ambitious collaboration with Tezuka Productions resulted in Metropolis, directed by Rintaro and adapted from the manga by Osamu Tezuka. Earlier collaborations with Tezuka productions included two feature-length films made for Sanrio starring Tezuka's unicorn character Unico.

Director Satoshi Kon produced all four of his films with the studio: Perfect Blue, Millennium Actress, Tokyo Godfathers, and Paprika, as well as his TV series Paranoia Agent. Kon was also making his fifth film the Dreaming Machine with Madhouse, although it was left incomplete at his death in 2010.

In 2003, Madhouse produced Nasu: Summer in Andalusia, which was adapted from the seinen manga Nasu by Iou Kuroda and directed by Studio Ghibli veteran Kitarō Kōsaka. Nasu was the first Japanese animated film ever selected for screening at the Cannes Film Festival. Kōsaka followed up his film with an OVA sequel in 2007.

In 2006, director Mamoru Hosoda began his career with the studio by directing The Girl Who Leapt Through Time.

Recent productions included Masayuki Kojima's theatrical debut Forest of Piano (2007), Hosoda's acclaimed Summer Wars (2009), Sunao Katabuchi's Mai Mai Miracle (2009), the company's first CG animated film, Yona Yona Penguin (2009), Takeshi Koike's feature film debut Redline (2009), a theatrical version of the Trigun series, Trigun: Badlands Rumble (2010), and The Tibetan Dog, a co-production with China (2011).

The first film in the Hunter × Hunter franchise, Hunter × Hunter: Phantom Rouge premiered on January 12, 2013.

After producing and animating Mamoru Hosoda's The Girl Who Leapt Through Time and Summer Wars, Madhouse co-produced Wolf Children (2012) with Hosoda's newly-founded Studio Chizu.

Collectively, Madhouse films have won a total of two Japan Academy Prizes, four Grand Prizes in the Animation Division at Japan Media Arts Festival, two Gertie Awards, six Mainichi Film Awards (three Ōfuji Noburō Awards, and three Animation Grand Awards), two Tokyo Anime Awards for Animation of the Year, and five Animation Kobe Feature Film Awards.

==== 1980s ====
- The Fantastic Adventures of Unico (March 14, 1981)
- Natsu e no Tobira (March 20, 1981) (co-produced by Toei Animation)
- Haguregumo (April 24, 1982) (co-produced by Toei Animation)
- Harmagedon (March 12, 1983)
- Unico in the Island of Magic (July 16, 1983)
- Barefoot Gen (July 21, 1983)
- Lensman: Secret of the Lens (July 7, 1984)
- The Dagger of Kamui (March 9, 1985)
- Barefoot Gen 2 (June 14, 1986)
- Phoenix: Karma Chapter (December 20, 1986)
- Toki no Tabibito: Time Stranger (December 20, 1986)
- Hoero! Bun Bun (April 4, 1987)
- Wicked City (April 25, 1987)
- Neo Tokyo (September 25, 1987)
- Twilight of the Cockroaches (November 21, 1987)
- Legend of the Galactic Heroes: My Conquest is the Sea of Stars (February 6, 1988) (co-produced by Artland)

==== 1990s ====
- A Wind Named Amnesia (December 22, 1990)
- Urusei Yatsura: Always, My Darling (August 18, 1991)
- Yawara! Soreyuke Koshinuke Kids!! (August 1, 1992)
- Ninja Scroll (June 5, 1993)
- Rail of the Star (July 10, 1993)
- Kattobase! Dreamers ―Carp Tanjō Monogatari― (January 22, 1994)
- Street Fighter II: The Animated Movie (August 6, 1994, co-animated with Group TAC)
- Anne no Nikki (August 19, 1995)
- Memories (segment Stink Bomb) (December 23, 1995)
- X (August 3, 1996)
- Black Jack: The Movie (November 30, 1996)
- Perfect Blue (August 5, 1997)
- Clover (August 21, 1999)
- Cardcaptor Sakura: The Movie (August 21, 1999)

==== 2000s ====
- Cardcaptor Sakura Movie 2: The Sealed Card (July 15, 2000)
- Vampire Hunter D: Bloodlust (April 21, 2001)
- Metropolis (May 26, 2001)
- Millennium Actress (July 28, 2001)
- Di Gi Charat - A Trip to the Planet (December 22, 2001)
- WXIII: Patlabor the Movie 3 (March 30, 2002)
- Hajime no Ippo: Champion Road (April 18, 2003)
- Tokyo Godfathers (November 8, 2003)
- Nasu: Summer in Andalusia (December 21, 2003)
- The Girl Who Leapt Through Time (July 15, 2006)
- Paprika (November 25, 2006)
- Bleach: Memories of Nobody (December 16, 2006, co-animated with Toho Company and Pierrot)
- Highlander: The Search for Vengeance (June 5, 2007)
- Forest of Piano (July 21, 2007)
- Cinnamon the Movie (December 22, 2007)
- Bleach: The DiamondDust Rebellion (December 22, 2007, co-animated with Toho Company and Pierrot)
- Hells (October 18, 2008)
- Summer Wars (August 1, 2009)
- Redline (August 21, 2009)
- Mai Mai Miracle (November 21, 2009)
- Yona Yona Penguin (December 23, 2009)

==== 2010s ====
- Trigun: Badlands Rumble (April 24, 2010)
- The Tibetan Dog (July 15, 2011)
- The Princess and the Pilot (October 1, 2011, co-animated with TMS Entertainment)
- Wolf Children (July 21, 2012, co-produced with Studio Chizu)
- Hunter × Hunter: Phantom Rouge (January 12, 2013)
- Death Billiards (March 2, 2013)
- Hunter × Hunter: The Last Mission (December 27, 2013)
- No Game, No Life Zero (July 15, 2017)
- Kimi no Koe wo Todoketai (August 25, 2017)
- Okko's Inn Movie (June 11, 2018, co-produced with DLE)

==== 2020s ====
- Goodbye, Don Glees! (February 18, 2022)
- Gold Kingdom and Water Kingdom (January 27, 2023)
- Overlord: The Sacred Kingdom (September 20, 2024)
- Ghost (2027)

=== OVAs ===
(These also include some outsourced productions)

==== 1980s ====
- Wounded Man (1986–1988)
- Phoenix: Yamato Chapter (1987)
- Phoenix: Space Chapter (1987)
- Bride of Deimos (1988)
- Demon City Shinjuku (1988)
- Kaze wo Nuke! (1988)
- Fairy King (1988)
- Legend of the Galactic Heroes (1988–1989, part 1 only)
- Goku Midnight Eye (1989)

==== 1990s ====
- Eguchi Hisashi no Nantoka Narudesho! (1990)
- Nineteen 19 (1990)
- Cyber City Oedo 808 (1990–1991)
- Record of Lodoss War (1990–1991)
- Devil Hunter Yohko (1990–1995)
- Doomed Megalopolis (1991–1992)
- Urusei Yatsura (1991, OVAs 10 and 11)
- Tokyo Babylon (1992–1994)
- Zetsuai 1989 (1992–1994)
- Download (1992)
- Battle Angel (1993)
- Mermaid's Scar (1993)
- The Cockpit (Slipstream segment, 1993)
- Black Jack (1993–2011)
- Final Fantasy: Legend of the Crystals (1994)
- Phantom Quest Corp. (1994–1995)
- Clamp in Wonderland (1994–2007)
- Spirit Warrior (1994)
- DNA² (1995, co-animated with Studio Deen)
- Bio Hunter (1995)
- Birdy the Mighty (1996–1997)
- Psycho Diver: Soul Siren (1997)
- Night Warriors: Darkstalkers' Revenge (1997–1998)
- Twilight of the Dark Master (1997)
- Satanika (1998)

==== 2000s ====
- 48x61 (2002)
- Space Pirate Captain Herlock: The Endless Odyssey (2002–2003)
- Trava: Fist Planet (2003)
- The Animatrix (2003, co-animated with Studio 4°C, DNA Productions, Square USA, Silver Pictures, Warner Bros. Animation)
- Hajime no Ippo: Mashiba vs. Kimura (2003)
- Lament of the Lamb (2003–2004)
- Aquarian Age: The Movie (2003)
- Di Gi Charat Theater - Leave it to Pyoko! (2003)
- Tsuki no Waltz (2004)
- Otogi-Jūshi Akazukin (2005)
- Last Order: Final Fantasy VII (2005)
- Strawberry 100% (2005)
- Nasu: A Migratory Bird with Suitcase (2007)
- Hellsing Ultimate (V–VII) (2008–2009)

==== 2010s ====
- Black Lagoon Omake (2009–2010)
- Black Lagoon: Roberta's Blood Trail (2010–2011)
- Supernatural: The Anime Series (2011)
- Highschool of the Dead: Drifters of the Dead (2011)
- Arata-naru Sekai (2012)
- Iron Man: Rise of Technovore (2013)
- Chihayafuru 2: Waga Mi Yo ni Furu Nagame Seshi Ma ni (2013)
- Avengers Confidential: Black Widow and Punisher (2014)
- One-Punch Man: Road to Hero (2015)
- Cardcaptor Sakura: Clear Card Prologue (2017)

==== 2020s ====
- ACCA: 13-Territory Inspection Dept. - Regards (2020)

=== Video games ===
- Sol-Feace (1991)
- Earnest Evans (1991)
- Anett Futatabi (1993)
- Wild Arms (1996)
- Elemental Gearbolt (1997)
- Solatorobo: Red the Hunter (2010)
- Persona 2: Eternal Punishment (intro sequence) (2012)
- Persona 4 Golden (intro sequence) (2012)
- Persona 4 Arena (intro sequence) (2012)
- Etrian Odyssey Untold: The Millennium Girl (2013)
- Etrian Odyssey 2 Untold: The Fafnir Knight (2014)
- Echoes of Mana (trailer) (2022)

== Collaborations ==
Madhouse designed the characters for Hudson Soft's game Virus (the first installment of the Virus Buster Serge franchise). Madhouse worked with Square Enix on the OVA Last Order: Final Fantasy VII as well as Capcom for Devil May Cry: The Animated Series, Street Fighter II: The Animated Movie, and Street Fighter: The Animated Series.

They collaborated with Studio Ghibli by contributing key animation assistance to Hayao Miyazaki's films including My Neighbor Totoro (1988), Spirited Away (2001), Howl's Moving Castle (2004), and The Secret World of Arrietty (2010), as well as Tomomi Mochizuki's films I Can Hear the Sea (1993) and Goro Miyazaki's Tales from Earthsea (2006).

Madhouse also collaborated with Disney for the anime Stitch! for its first and second arcs (equal to 56 episodes total), between 2008 and 2010. They also animated the intro cutscene to PlayStation video game Wild Arms and the opening movie to PlayStation Vita video game Persona 4 Golden (Persona 4: The Golden in Japan), along with opening to the PSP remake of Persona 2: Eternal Punishment.

Madhouse collaborated with professional rapper Snoop Dogg in the 2006 horror-comedy anthology movie Hood of Horror, in which they assisted in the animated sections of the movie. They also worked with the Wachowskis and other famed Japanese animators and studios to create The Animatrix, an animated anthology adaptation of the Matrix franchise; Madhouse particularly worked on its short films "Program" and "World Record."

In 2010 to 2014, Madhouse collaborated with Marvel Entertainment and Sony Pictures to create adaptations of Blade, Iron Man, Wolverine, X-Men, Black Widow, and Punisher, and then in 2017, collaborated again with Marvel Entertainment, Disney+, and Walt Disney Japan to create an adaptation of the Avengers. Conversely, they worked with Marvel's rival company, DC Entertainment, Warner Premiere, and Warner Brothers to create an anthology adaptation of Batman. Madhouse had also worked with Warner Brothers and Sony on separate occasions to create series adaptations of Ultraviolet and Supernatural. Furthermore, Madhouse worked with Imagi Animation Studios and Davis-Panzer Productions to create an adaptation of Highlander as an animated film. Additionally, they were commissioned by Top Cow Productions, an imprint of Image Comics, to provide an anime adaptation of Aphrodite IX. However, the project was suddenly canceled without any explanation.

2010 also saw the publication of Devil, a manga intended specifically for the American market; the property is a collaboration with Dark Horse Comics, and is written and drawn by Torajiro Kishi.

Madhouse also participated in animating the Wakfu TV special Ogrest, la légende in collaboration with Ankama Japan.

== Foreign production history ==
In addition to Madhouse creating anime of Western media, they were also responsible for making a few notable American cartoons, particularly through collaborations with Western companies such as Hanna-Barbera, Film Roman, and HBO. Typically, though, many cartoons that has involved creative input from Madhouse in any way are done through its South Korean subsidiary DR Movie.

- The Jetsons (ジェットソンズ) (September 16, 1985 – November 12, 1987) (co-animated with Hanna-Barbera with Toei Animation; Season 3 only; uncredited)
- The Transformers: The Movie (トランスフォーマー：ザ・ムービー) (August 8, 1986) (co-animated with Sunbow Productions, Marvel Productions, and Toei Animation; uncredited, provides key and in-between animation)
- Popples (ポップル) (September 13, 1986 – July 18, 1987) (co-production with KK C&D Asia, Korumi, Junio and Shaft)
- The Pirates of Dark Water (ダークウォーターの海賊) (February 25, 1991 – May 23, 1993) (co-animated with Hanna-Barbera with Fil-Cartoons, Wang Film Productions, Tama Production, Big Star, Kennedy Cartoons, and Mr. Big Cartoons)
- The Adventures of T-Rex (T-レックス) (September 14 – November 24, 1992) (co-animated with C&D (Créativité et Développement), Gunther-Wahl Productions, and Kitty Films)
- The Tick (ダニ) (September 10, 1994 – November 24, 1996) (co-production with Sunbow Productions, Graz Entertainment, AKOM, and Fox Children's Productions)
- Street Fighter (ストリートファイター) (October 21, 1995 – May 14, 1997) (co-production with InVision Entertainment, Graz Entertainment, USA Studios and Sunrise)
- Wing Commander Academy (ウイング・コマンダー・アカデミー) (September 21 – December 21, 1996) (co-animated with Universal Animation Studios)
- Todd McFarlane's Spawn (トッド・マクファーレンのスポーン) (May 16, 1997 – May 28, 1999) (co-animated with HBO Animation, Todd McFarlane Entertainment, with Mook Animation, DR Movie, and Koko Enterprises Ltd.)
- X-Men: Evolution (X-メン:進化論) (November 4, 2000 – October 25, 2003) (co-animated with Film Roman, Marvel Studios, with Mook Animation, DR Movie, and WHITE LINE)
- Constant Payne (コンスタントペイン) (May 22, 2001) (co-production with Nickelodeon Animation Studios, Nicktoons, and Pacifica Sound Group)
- Megas XLR (メガXLR) (August 23, 2002 – January 15, 2005) (co-animated with Cartoon Cartoons and Cartoon Network Studios; LowBrow pilot only)
- Hellboy Animated (ヘルボーイアニメ化) (October 28, 2006 – March 10, 2007) (co-animated with Film Roman, Revolution Studios, and Starz Distribution)
- Hood of Horror (恐怖のフード) (November 4, 2006) (co-production with Social Capital Films, BloodWorks, and Snoopadelic Films; animated prologue and sequences only)
- Batman: Gotham Knight (バットマン：ゴッサムナイト) (July 8, 2008) (co-animated with Studio 4°C, Bee Train Production, Production I.G, Dong Woo Animation, and Warner Bros. Animation)
- Hulk Vs. Wolverine (ハルク対ウルヴァリン) (January 27, 2009) (co-animated with Marvel Animation and MOI Animation)
- Hulk Vs. Thor (ハルク対トール) (January 27, 2009) (co-animated with Marvel Animation and MOI Animation)
- Planet Hulk (プラネットハルク) (February 2, 2010) (co-animated with Marvel Animation and MOI Animation)
- The Boondocks (ブーンドックス) (November 6, 2005 – June 23, 2014) (co-animated with Dong Woo Animation, MOI Animation, JM Animation, Studio Mir, and Lotto Animation; uncredited)
- The Looney Tunes Show (ルーニー・テューンズ・ショー) (May 3, 2011 – August 27, 2013) (co-animated with Warner Bros. Animation; flashback sequence Young Granny Paris during World War II for the season one episode "Eligible Bachelors")
- Wakfu (ワクフ) (October 30, 2008 – present) (co-animated with Ankama, France Télévisions, Frakas Productions, and Pictanovo)

== See also ==
- Triangle Staff, an animation studio founded in 1987 by multiple former Madhouse animators.
- Nomad, animation studio founded in 2003 by another former Madhouse producer Tatsuya Ono.
- MAPPA, an animation studio founded in 2011 by former Madhouse producer Masao Maruyama.
- Studio VOLN, an animation studio founded in 2014 by former Madhouse producer Keiji Mita.
- CLAP, an animation studio founded in 2016 by former Madhouse producer Ryoichiro Matsuo after working freelance.
- Nut, an animation studio founded in 2017 by former Madhouse producer Takuya Tsunoki.
