= Wicked City (1987 film) =

1987 Japanese film by Yoshiaki Kawajiri

- Film poster
- Kanji: 妖獣都市
- Literal meaning: 'Supernatural Beast City'
- Revised Hepburn: Yōjū Toshi
- Directed by: Yoshiaki Kawajiri
- Screenplay by: Norio Osada
- Based on: Wicked City: Black Guard by Hideyuki Kikuchi
- Produced by: Makoto Seya; Kenji Kurata
- Starring: Yūsaku Yara; Toshiko Fujita; Ichirō Nagai; Mari Yokoo; Takeshi Aono
- Cinematography: Kinichi Ishikawa
- Edited by: Harutoshi Ogata
- Music by: Osamu Shoji
- Production companies: Japan Home Video; Video Art; Madhouse
- Distributed by: Joy Pack Film
- Release date: 19 April 1987
- Running time: 82 minutes
- Country: Japan
- Language: Japanese

Wicked City (Japanese: 妖獣都市, Hepburn: Yōjū Toshi; lit. 'Supernatural Beast City') is a 1987 Japanese adult animated neo-noir action gothic horror film produced by Video Art and Madhouse for Japan Home Video. Based on Black Guard, the first novel of the Wicked City series by Hideyuki Kikuchi, the film is the solo directorial debut of Yoshiaki Kawajiri, who also served as the character designer, storyboard artist, animation director and a key animator.

The story takes place towards the end of the 20th century and explores the idea that the human world secretly coexists with the demon world with a secret police force known as the Black Guard protecting the boundary.

== Plot ==
The existence of the "Black World"—an alternate dimension populated by supernatural demons—is known to few humans. For centuries, a peace treaty between the Black World and the world of humans has been maintained to ensure relative harmony. Both sides of the continuum are protected by an organization of secret agents called the Black Guard, specifically from a group of radicalized members of the Black World.

In Tokyo, Renzaburō Taki, a salaryman for an electronics company by day, and a Black Guard when needed, has sex with Kanako, a young woman who he has been meeting at a local bar for three months. Kanako reveals herself to be a spider-like doppelgänger from the Black World Radicals and escapes with a sample of Taki's semen after attempting to kill him. The next day, Taki is assigned to protect Giuseppe Mayart, a dwarfish and perverted 200-year-old mystic who is a signatory for a ratified treaty between the Human World and the Black World, and a target for the Radicals. Taki is also informed that he will be working with a partner: a Black Guard from the Black World.

While awaiting Mayart's arrival at Narita, Taki is attacked by two Radicals at the runway, but is saved by his partner—a beautiful fashion model named Makie. Taki and Makie eventually meet Mayart; the trio take shelter in a Hibiya hotel with spiritual barriers to protect it from Radicals. While playing chess to pass time, the hotelier explains to Taki, who is unsure of his responsibilities within the Black Guard, that he will only value his position once he knows what he is protecting. During an assault on the hotel by a Radical named Jin (an invention of Kawajiri's), Mayart sneaks out.

Makie and Taki find him in a soapland in the grip of a Radical who has sapped his health, prompting a frantic trip to a spiritual hospital under Black Guard protection. Halfway there, Makie is taken prisoner by a tentacle demon, and Taki is forced to leave her behind. Upon their arrival at the clinic, Mayart begins his recovery, while Mr. Shadow—the leader of the Radicals—uses a psychic projection to taunt Taki into rescuing Makie. Ignoring Mayart's threats that he will be fired, he pursues Shadow to a dilapidated building far from the hospital, where he finds Makie being gang raped by Radicals. A female Radical attempts to seduce Taki, asking him if he ever copulated with Makie, but he kills her and the Radicals violating Makie, and wounds Shadow.

While tending to each other, Makie reveals to Taki that she was once romantically involved with a member of the Radicals, and that she joined the Black Guard because of her belief in the need for peace between the two worlds. Upon returning to the clinic, the pair are fired by Taki's superior, who deems Taki's desires a liability to his duties. While driving through a tunnel with a stowaway Mayart, they are ensnared by Kanako, who—having determined that Taki and Makie were partnered for genetic reasons—attempts to kill them again. Bolts of supernatural lightning kill Kanako, while Taki and Makie are wounded. They later awaken inside a church, and passionately make love.

A final attack by Shadow comes against Taki and Makie, which is deflected by more lightning generated by a surprisingly healthy Mayart, who reveals that he was actually hired to protect his "bodyguards". Mayart and Taki almost succeed in defeating Shadow, but the final blow comes from Makie, whose powers have increased due to her being impregnated by Taki. Mayart explains that the two are essential to the new peace treaty; Taki and Makie were selected to be the first couple from both worlds that can produce half-human, half-demon children, and their bond will be instrumental in ensuring everlasting peace between the two worlds. Although angry with Mayart because they were not informed of the Black Guard's plans, Taki implicitly admits that he loves Makie and, per the hotelier's advice, wants to protect her and their child. The trio leave to attend the peace ceremony. Taki remains in the Black Guard to ensure the protection of both worlds and his loved ones.

== Cast ==
Character	Japanese	English (Streamline, 1993)	English (Manga UK, 1993)
Renzaburō Taki	Yūsaku Yara	Gregory Snegoff	Stuart Milligan
Makie	Toshiko Fujita	Gaye Kruger	Tamsin Hollo
Giuseppe Mayart	Ichirō Nagai	Mike Reynolds	George Little
Mr. Shadow	Takeshi Aono	Jeff Winkless	Ray Lonnen
Kanako/Spider Woman	Mari Yokoo	Edie Mirman	Liza Ross
Black Guard President	Yasuo Muramatsu	Robert V. Barron	Graydon Gould
Hotelier	Tamio Ōki	David Povall	William Roberts
Jin	Kōji Totani	Kerrigan Mahan (uncredited)	Brian Note (uncredited)
Soap Girl	Arisa Andou	Joyce Kurtz (uncredited)	Pamela Merrick (uncredited)
Clinic Director	Kazuhiko Kishino	Edward Mannix (uncredited)	Douglas Blackwell (uncredited)
Bartender	Ikuya Sawaki	Jason Klassi	Adam Henderson (uncredited)
Demon Temptress	Asami Mukaidono	Eleni Kelakos	Liza Ross
Doctor	Masato Hirano	John Dantona (uncredited)	Adam Henderson (uncredited)
Demons	Ginzō Matsuo (uncredited); Bin Shimada (uncredited)	Michael McConnohie (uncredited); Carl Macek (uncredited)	William Roberts
Taki's Coworkers	Seiko Nakano (uncredited); Kenichi Ogata (uncredited)	Melora Harte; Steve Kramer	Pamela Merrick (uncredited); Bob Sessions (uncredited)
Secretary	Naoko Watanabe (uncredited)	Alexandra Kenworthy	Tamsin Hollo
Narrator	Yūsaku Yara	Gregory Snegoff	Bob Sessions (uncredited)

== Production ==
Yoshiaki Kawajiri had just completed his work directing The Running Man, a segment from the portmanteau film Neo-Tokyo (1987), and was asked to direct a 35-minute OVA short film based on Hideyuki Kikuchi's novel. Writing under the pseudonym "Kisei Chō", Norio Osada's original draft of the screenplay began with Makie's saving of Taki from two demons at Narita, and ended with Taki's first battle with Mr. Shadow and rescue of Makie. After Japan Home Video were shown the first 15 minutes of completed animation, they were impressed enough with Kawajiri's work that the runtime was extended to 80 minutes. Kawajiri saw this as an opportunity to explore more characterization and created more animation for the start, the middle and the end. The project was completed in under a year.

Hayao Miyazaki was reportedly so impressed by Kazuo Oga's art direction that he hired Oga for My Neighbor Totoro (1988).

Hitomi Tohyama performed the film's ending song, "7 Course no Prologue", as well as an insert song.

== Release ==
Although classified as OVA by JHV, it was released theatrically in Japan by Joy Pack Film on 19 April 1987 and received a western dub by Streamline Pictures under the name Wicked City on 20 August 1993.

=== Home media ===
After Streamline lost distribution rights, it was licensed and distributed by Urban Vision. An edited version was distributed by Manga Entertainment in the United Kingdom with a different dub. Both were released in Australia, with the Manga UK dub being released on VHS in 1994. In 1995, Manga Video released in Australia a bundle VHS consisting of Wicked City and Monster City, this version containing the Streamline dub. In 1997 when Madman Entertainment was named distributor for Manga in Australia, the Streamline dub was released on a single tape, and the Manga UK version was phased out.

On 26 July 2015, Discotek Media announced at their Otakon panel that they have acquired the rights and re-released the film on DVD in 2016 with a new video transfer and with both Streamline and Manga UK English dubs. On 28 September 2018, Toei announced a Region 2 Blu-ray release of the OVA to be released on 9 January 2019.

== Critical reception ==
Desson Howe of The Washington Post, who observed the level of sexual violence toward women in the film, characterized it as a "post-Chandler, quasi-cyberpunky violence fest". Howe found the film compelling for its "gymnastic" camera angles, its kinetic pace and imaginative (if slightly twisted) images." He also found the English dubbing laughable, though he saw ominous subtext in various bits of dialogue and other moments in the film.

Richard Harrington, also of The Washington Post, saw the film as an attempt to create the Blade Runner of Japanese animation, citing its distinctively languid pace, linear storytelling and gradual exposition. Harrington also detected a Brave New World subtext, and calling it "stylish and erotic, exciting in its limited confrontations and provocative in its ambition." He also added that "there's a tender ballad moment between Taki and Makie that's right out of Disney."

Charles Solomon of the Los Angeles Times wrote that the film epitomizes the "sadistic, misogynistic erotica" popular in Japan. He noted that Yoshiaki Kawajiri composes scenes like a live-action filmmaker, and complimented his deft cutting and camera angles, but felt that the "Saturday-morning style animation" and juvenile story did not warrant the effort. Solomon also opined that Kisei Choo's screenplay was inscrutable.

Marc Savlov of The Austin Chronicle gave the film two-and-a-half out of five stars, calling it a "better-than-average" treatment of the "demons from an alternate universe" subject matter. Savlov opined that the film did not reach "the delightfully sadomasochistic heights" of Urotsukidōji: Legend of the Overfiend. He said Wicked City was easier to follow than the latter due to having a more linear and rapid storyline, along with the lack of flashbacks and cyberpunk jargon that Savlov disliked in the genre. Savlov also appreciated the clarified animation. Savlov commented, "This may not be the second coming of Akira, but it's a step in the right direction."

Stig Høgset of THEM Anime Reviews gave Wicked City a 3-out-of-5-star rating, handing out praise for the animation, artwork, story, characters, theme, and the chemistry between Taki and Makie, but criticized certain portions of dialogue as "corny", and some of the sexual and demonic imagery as "disturbing." He ultimately concluded that "it's 'quick fix' horror with occasional and casual sex thrown in for the heck of it, so don't go in expecting a masterpiece that warrants purchase. It's a great choice for the late-night horror rental district, though, if you can bear with a couple of scenes."

Bob Strauss from Animation Magazine described it as "one of the strongest features to come out of Japan's anime", presenting a seemingly incoherent scenario that "makes more sense as it climaxes, revealing a few solid, thematic reasons for what initially seemed to be inexplicable behavior, gratuitous sex and reckless sci-fi gimmickry." He added that there was also a "neat moral and spiritual subtext to the whole bizarre enterprise."

Chuck Arrington of DVD Talk, reviewing the VHS of the film, recommended that consumers "skip it", citing the transfer errors and scratches on the print, the at-times washed-out colors, and the uninteresting lengthy interview among the DVD's extras. Arrington thought that the visuals and the fight scenes were generally done well, and that the English dub was acceptable, though exhibited some "wooden elements" endemic to all anime titles. Regarding the sexual violence in the film, Arrington found it excluded recommendation for most viewers, commenting, "Though not nearly as gruesome as Legend of the Overfiend, Wicked City is definitely not for children and not really for adults either."

Theron Martin of Anime News Network gave Wicked City a rating of B−, and stated that "in all, Wicked City isn't great fare, but if explicit, sexually charged supernatural action stories appeal to you then it should fit the bill quite nicely."

Literary critic Susan J. Napier describes the film in her book, Anime from Akira to Princess Mononoke, as having similar depictions of the female body as its contemporaries: objects to be "viewed, violated, tortured" while also being "awesomely powerful, almost unstoppable". She credits the film's more nuanced and artistic approach within this context, but cites the metamorphoses of the female Black World agents as the film's ideas about female sexuality being limited to "an essentially conservative fantasy", with the powerful women's bodies being ultimately destroyed in "lengthy scenes of graphic violence".

In John Hackett and Seán Harrington's Beasts of the Deep: Sea Creatures and Popular Culture, the authors place Wicked City alongside Hokusai's octopus prints as re-establishing a link between the maritime and the erotic.

Some of the film's fight scenes were featured in Manga Production's Mean & Mercenary VHS compilations.

== Live-action remake ==
The Wicked City, a Hong Kong live-action adaptation was produced in 1992 by Film Workshop Ltd. The film was directed by Tai Kit Mak, produced and written by Tsui Hark, and starred Jacky Cheung, Leon Lai, Michelle Reis, Yuen Woo-ping, Roy Cheung and Tatsuya Nakadai. (Michelle Reis said that Tsui actually directed many scenes himself.)

The story takes place in Hong Kong during a conflict between worlds of Humans and "Rapters". Special police in the city are investigating a mysterious drug named "happiness". Taki, one of the police, meets his old lover Windy, who is a rapter and now mistress of a powerful old rapter named Daishu. Taki and other special police track down and fight Daishu, but later find that he hopes to coexist with human. The son of Daishu, Shudo, is the mastermind. In the end, Shudo is defeated, but Daishu and Taki's friends die too. Windy leaves alone.
