= Takeshi Koike =

Japanese animator and film director

- Born: January 26, 1968 (age 58); Kaminoyama, Yamagata, Japan
- Occupations: film director, animator

Takeshi Koike (小池健, Koike Takeshi) (born January 26, 1968) is a Japanese animator, illustrator and film director.

Something of a protégé of Yoshiaki Kawajiri, he was also influenced by Yoshinori Kanada, Frank Miller, Mike Mignola, and Katsuhito Ishii. He went straight from a high school education to beginning his career at Madhouse as an in-betweener on works directed by Kawajiri after being interviewed by him. His first professional work as director is the title sequence of the 2000 film Party 7; while his first feature film is Redline, which premiered in 2009 and was released in 2010. He served as character designer and animation director for 2012's Lupin the Third: The Woman Called Fujiko Mine, and directed film continuations of it starting with Lupin the IIIrd: Jigen's Gravestone in 2014. Work outside of animation includes the artwork for the 2004 Dreams Come True single "Yasashii Kiss o Shite".

== Filmography ==
=== Director ===
Year	Title	Type	Notes
2000	Party 7	Feature film	Opening animation of the live-action film
2000	Smanime	Short film	Three short animated films for a SMAP concert
2003	Trava: Fist Planet	OVA	
2003	World Record	Short film	Part of The Animatrix anthology
2003	Afro Samurai: Pilot	Television pilot	
2005	The Taste of Tea	Feature film	Animated sequence in the live-action film
2005	Funky Forest	Feature film	Animated sequence in the live-action film
2009	Iron Man: Pilot	Television pilot	
2009	Redline	Feature film	
2014	Lupin the IIIrd: Jigen's Gravestone	Feature film	
2017	Lupin the IIIrd: Goemon's Blood Spray	Feature film	
2019	Lupin the IIIrd: Fujiko's Lie	Feature film	
2025	Lupin the IIIrd: Zenigata and the Two Lupins	ONA	
2025	Lupin the IIIrd the Movie: The Immortal Bloodline	Feature film	

=== Other work ===
- The Foxes of Chironup Island (1987) – In-Between Animation
- Wicked City (1987) – In-Between Animation
- Legend of Galactic Heroes: My Conquest is the Sea of Stars (1988) – Animation Check
- Bride of Deimos (1988) – Animation Check
- Demon City Shinjuku (1988) – Animation Check
- Legend of the Galactic Heroes 1st season (1988) – Key Animation (Ep 19)
- Goku: Midnight Eye (1989) – Animation Check, Key Animation
- Goku II: Midnight Eye (1989) – Key Animation
- Yawara! A Fashionable Judo Girl (1989) Key Animation (Ep 1, 18)
- Cyber City Oedo 808 (1990) – Mechanical Animation Director, Key Animation (Ep 1, 2, 3)
- Teki wa Kaizoku: Neko no Kyoen (1990) Key Animation (Ep 1, 2)
- Nineteen 19 (1990) Key Animation
- A Wind Named Amnesia (1990) – Key Animation
- Urusei Yatsura: Always My Darling (1991) – Key Animation
- Doomed Megalopolis (1991) – Assistant Animation Director (Ep 1, 2), Key Animation (Ep 1, 2, 3)
- Giant Robo: The Day the Earth Stood Still (1992) – Key Animation (Ep 1, 6)
- Ninja Scroll (1993) – Key Animation
- The Cockpit (1994) (segment Slipstream) – Key Animation
- True Peakock King (1994) – Character Design, Key Animation
- Clamp in Wonderland (1994) – Key Animation
- Darkside Blues (1994) – Key Animation
- Mighty Space Miners (1994) – Opening Animation, Ending Animation
- DNA² (1996) – Mechanic Design, Opening Animation
- Bio Hunter (1995) – Key Animation
- Memories (1995) (segment Stink Bomb) – Key Animation
- X (1996) – Key Animation
- Birdy the Mighty (1996) – Key Animation (Ep 1–4)
- Cardcaptor Sakura (1998) – Key Animation (Ep1, 57)
- Jubei-chan – Secret of the Lovely Eyepatch (1999) – Animation Director (Ep 10, 11)
- Cardcaptor Sakura: The Movie (1999) – Key Animation
- Carried by the Wind: Tsukikage Ran (2000) – Key Animation (Op, Ep 1, 5)
- Hidamari no Ki (2000) – Key Animation
- Fighting Spirit (2000) – Key Animation (Op 1, Ep 20)
- Cardcaptor Sakura Movie 2: The Sealed Card (2000) – Key Animation
- Blood: The Last Vampire (2000) – Key Animation
- Vampire Hunter D: Bloodlust (2000) – Setting Design, Key Animation
- WXIII: Patlabor the Movie 3 (2002) – Key Animation
- Texhnolyze (2003) – Key Animation (Ep1)
- Dead Leaves (2004) – Key Animation
- Samurai Champloo (2004) Key Animation (Opening Animation, Ep 5)
- The Taste of Tea (2004) – Animation Director
- Funky Forest (2005) – Animation Director
- Iron Man (2010) – Mechanical Design, Key Animation (Ep 1, 7, 11)
- Trigun: Badlands Rumble (2010) – Key Animation
- Lupin the Third: The Woman Called Fujiko Mine (2012) – Character Design, Animation Director, Episode Animation Director (Ep 1, 13), Key Animation (Opening, Ep 13)
- Yasuke (2021) – Character Design
