= Sayo Yamamoto =

Japanese anime director (born 1977)

- 山本沙代
- Born: April 13, 1977 (age 49); Tokyo, Japan
- Occupations: Director, animator
- Years active: 2000-present
- Employer: Madhouse (former)

Sayo Yamamoto (山本 沙代, Yamamoto Sayo; born April 13, 1977) is a Japanese anime director and storyboard artist. She is known for directing the critically acclaimed anime series Michiko & Hatchin, Yuri!!! on Ice, and Lupin the Third: The Woman Called Fujiko Mine. After graduating from the College of Art and Design in Tokyo, she began work at Studio Madhouse, where she had her directing debut at age 25.

Fujiko Mine was awarded the "New Face" award from the Japan Media Arts Festival in 2012.

== Career ==
=== Education and early work ===
During her time at the College of Art and Design, Yamamoto focused her attention on animation, as she felt less interested in the other things she was being taught. Her student project was an animation about samurai using actor, and frequent Akira Kurosawa collaborator, Toshiro Mifune as an inspiration. While in the process of looking for a job after graduation, she showed this work to director Satoshi Kon. Enthusiastic about her potential, Kon intended to hire her to work on his second feature Millennium Actress, but studio politics eventually caused her to leave the project.

She had her debut at Studio Madhouse working as storyboarder on the X television series headed by Madhouse director Yoshiaki Kawajiri. Soon after, she would have her first collaboration with directors Takeshi Koike and Katsuhito Ishii on the original video animation Trava: Fist Planet. Yamamoto had her directing debut in three episodes of the series Dragon Drive. It was during her time at Madhouse that she began her work on anime opening and ending animations, which she would go on to direct for many other projects.

Yamamoto has stated that it was during her work on Samurai Champloo where she felt she was first able to truly express herself. Samurai Champloo also marks the first time she worked with frequent collaborators, director Shinichirō Watanabe and writer Dai Satō.

=== Michiko & Hatchin ===
During her time working on Samurai Champloo at Studio Manglobe, she was offered the chance to direct a project with full creative control. At the time, she was busy with work on Champloo, so she thought about what kind of project she wanted to direct for about a year. During that time, she took a trip to Brazil where she found the inspiration for her first series Michiko & Hatchin. The series, about an ex-convict and a young girl in search of the girl's father, was released in 2008.

At the press conference where Yamamoto unveiled the series, she said she wanted women especially to watch the series. "Our time slot was late at night, so office ladies would be returning home, and worn out from the day, they could have a beer and watch it."

=== The Woman Called Fujiko Mine ===
After a few years of working on storyboards and art for other projects, including movies Redline and Evangelion: 2.0 You Can (Not) Advance, she was approached by a producer to create a new Lupin III series, with full creative control. It was Yamamoto's own idea to have the series take place before the start of the 1971 Lupin series, directed by Masaaki Ōsumi, and to have character Fujiko Mine in the starring role.

== Notable works ==
=== TV productions ===
==== Series Director ====
- Michiko & Hatchin (2008; series director)
- Lupin the Third: The Woman Called Fujiko Mine (2012; series director)
- Yuri!!! on Ice (2016; series director, original work, script oversight)

==== Episode Director ====
- Dragon Drive (2002; storyboard, episode director)
- Texhnolyze (2003; storyboard, episode director, ending animation director)
- Gunslinger Girl (2003; storyboard, episode director)
- Samurai Champloo (2004; storyboard, episode director)
- Eureka Seven (2005; storyboard artist, episode/unit director)
- Ergo Proxy (2006; storyboard, episode director, assistant episode director)
- Panty & Stocking with Garterbelt (2010; storyboard, episode director)

==== Other ====
- X (TV series) (2001; setting production, storyboard)
- Magical Shopping Arcade Abenobashi (2002; storyboard)
- Galaxy Angel A (2002; storyboard)
- Gokusen (2004; ending animation storyboard and director)
- Galaxy Angel X (2004; storyboard)
- Rozen Maiden Träumend (2005; storyboard and unit director for opening animation)
- Kemonozume (2006; assistant episode director)
- Death Note (2006; Continuity)
- Hanamaru Kindergarten (2010; storyboard and unit director for 1st ending animation)
- Highschool of the Dead (2010; storyboard)
- Occult Academy (2010; storyboard)
- Arakawa Under the Bridge (2010; opening animation storyboard artist)
- Arakawa Under the Bridge x Bridge (2010; opening animation storyboard artist)
- Sacred Seven (2011; opening animation 1 storyboard)
- Wooser's Hand-to-Mouth Life (2012; opening and ending animation director)
- Psycho-Pass (2012; opening animation storyboard and director)
- Attack on Titan (2013; ending animation storyboard and episode/unit director)
- Space Dandy (2014; ending animation storyboard and director; episode 2, 20 storyboard and director)
- Rage of Bahamut: Genesis (2014; ending animation storyboard and director)
- Persona 5 (2016; storyboard and unit director for opening animation)

=== OVA ===
- Trava: Fist Planet (2003; storyboard, assistant director)
- The Animatrix: World Record (2003; costume design, original art)

=== Films ===
- Evangelion: 2.0 You Can (Not) Advance (2009; storyboard)
- Redline (2009; storyboard)
- Yuri!!! On Ice the Movie: Ice Adolescence (cancelled; director and writer)
- Toruru's Adventure (2014; director of Crazy Consumption short)

=== Shorts ===
- Endless Night (2015, 2016; creator and director)
- Toruru's Adventure (2014; director of Crazy Consumption short)

=== Music Videos ===
- Yasuyuki Okamura: Viva Namida (2013; director)

== All Works ==
Title	Media	Position	Year Start	Year End	Department	# of Episodes	Episodes
Arakawa Under the Bridge	TV Series	storyboard artist: opening animation	2010	n/a	Art Department	13	1-13
Arakawa Under the Bridge x Bridge	TV Series	storyboard artist: opening animation	2010	n/a	Art Department	12	1-9, 11-13
Attack on Titan	TV Series	episode director, unit director, storyboards, ending animation	2013	n/a	Art Department	13	1-13
Death Note	TV Series	Continuity	2007	n/a	Art Department	18	20-37
Endless Night	Short	Director	2015	n/a		n/a	
Ergo Proxy	TV Series	Director, storyboard artist	2006	n/a	Art Department		
Eureka Seven	TV Series	episode director, unit director, storyboard artist	2005	n/a		3	16, 36
Evangelion: 2.0 You Can (Not) Advance	Movie	storyboard artist	2009	n/a	Art Department	n/a	
Gunslinger Girl	TV Series	storyboard artist, unit director	2004	n/a	Art Department		
Highschool of the Dead	TV Series	storyboard artist	2010	n/a	Art Department		
Lupin the Third: The Woman Called Fujiko Mine	TV Mini Series	series director	2012	n/a		13	
Michiko to Hatchin	TV Series	series director	2008-2009	2009		22	
Redline	Movie	assistant storyboard artist	2009	n/a	Art Department	n/a	
Samurai Champloo	TV Series	Episode director, storyboard artist	2004-2005	2005	Art Department		
The Animatrix: World Record	OVA	costume design, original art	2003	n/a		n/a	
Toruru's Adventure: Crazy Consumption	Short	Director	2014	n/a		n/a	
Yuri!!! On Ice	TV Mini Series	series director, series composition, original creator	2016-2017	2017		13	
