= Trava: Fist Planet =

2003 original video animation

- TRAVA FIST PLANET episode 1
- Genre: Science fiction
- Original video animation
- Directed by: Takeshi Koike; Katsuhito Ishii
- Produced by: Masao Maruyama; Kazuto Takida
- Written by: Katsuhito Ishii
- Music by: Morgan Fisher
- Studio: Grasshoppa! Madhouse
- Released: 2001–2002
- Runtime: 10-15 minutes (each)
- Episodes: 4

TRAVA FIST PLANET episode 1 is an anime OVA released in four parts by Grasshoppa! between 2001 and 2002, directed by Katsuhito Ishii and Takeshi Koike. In March 2003, the four parts were re-edited into a single feature and released on a standalone DVD, which included English subtitles, a making-of, 5.1 audio remix, figures of Trava and Shinkai, and a 3-minute pilot for the potential sequel titled "episode 2."

== Plot ==
TRAVA FIST PLANET episode 1 tells the story of Trava (voiced by Kanji Tsuda) and Shinkai (voiced by Yoshiyuki Morishita) as they travel to finish surveying an unknown and possibly dangerous planet. Trava is an ex-military Power user, which is a form of mech-ship that enhances the pilot's abilities. Shinkai, the engineer, maintains the survey ship and Trava's Power. They hope to earn enough cash to enter Fist Planet, a Power fighting tournament with a grand prize of credits measured in billions. Before they can get to that, they must first deal with an amnesiac girl named Mikuru (voiced by Shie Kohinata), a giant named Reiter (voiced by Yūji Shimoda), and a horde of insectoid killer-robots.

Trava and Shinkai also appear as racers in Madhouse's 2009 film Redline.

== Sequel Preview ==
A 3-minute pilot for the sequel titled 'Episode 2' was released on a standalone Trava Fist Planet DVD as a special feature in 2003 and later surfaced online. It depicts an older Trava and Shinkai finally entering the Power Tournament in Fist Planet, only to be intercepted by the duo of Mikuru, the amnesiac princess and her guardian, the giant warrior Reiter now modified with cybernetics. The animosity between the two groups escalates and ends with Trava and Reiter in a showdown at the arena of Fist Planet, with Mikuru and Shinkai battling for who will be the best mechanic in the arena. The pilot was written by Sayo Yamamoto and storyboarded by Takeshi Koike, who also did all of the key animation. Despite the pilot's existence, no full direct sequel has been produced.

== Reception ==
Daryl Surat praised Trava's "snappy dialogue" and "wild and crazy camera angles". Mike Toole considered it "colorful and weird - Koike is at his kaleidoscopic, kinetic best".
