= Redline (2009 film) =

2009 Japanese film directed by Takeshi Koike

- Theatrical release poster
- Directed by: Takeshi Koike
- Screenplay by: Katsuhito Ishii; Yōji Enokido; Yoshiki Sakurai
- Story by: Katsuhito Ishii
- Produced by: Kentarō Yoshida; Yukiko Koike
- Starring: Takuya Kimura; Yū Aoi; Tatsuya Gashūin; Yoshinori Okada; Kanji Tsuda; Yoshiyuki Morishita; Akemi; Takeshi Aono; Kōsei Hirota; Unshō Ishizuka; Kenta Miyake; Kōji Ishii; Chō; Kenyu Horiuchi; Tadanobu Asano
- Cinematography: Ryu Takizawa
- Edited by: Satoshi Terauchi; Naoki Kawanishi
- Music by: James Shimoji
- Production company: Madhouse
- Distributed by: Tohokushinsha Film
- Release dates: August 14, 2009 (Locarno); October 9, 2010 (Japan)
- Running time: 102 minutes
- Country: Japan
- Language: Japanese

Redline (Japanese: レッドライン, Hepburn: Reddo rain; stylized as REDLINE) is a 2009 Japanese animated science fiction film produced by Madhouse and directed by Takeshi Koike in his directorial debut. It stars Takuya Kimura, Yū Aoi, Tatsuya Gashūin, Yoshinori Okada, Kanji Tsuda, Yoshiyuki Morishita, Akemi, Takeshi Aono, Kōsei Hirota, Unshō Ishizuka, Kenta Miyake, Kōji Ishii, Chō, Kenyu Horiuchi, Tadanobu Asano, and its screenplay was written by Katsuhito Ishii, Yōji Enokido and Yoshiki Sakurai, based on an original story by Ishii. It is set in the distant future, where a man known as JP takes on great risks for the chance of winning the titular underground race.

The film was in development for seven years and used over 100,000 hand-drawn frames. It premiered at the 62nd Locarno International Film Festival on August 14, 2009, and was theatrically released in Japan on October 9, 2010, by Tohokushinsha Film. Despite positive reviews, with particular praise for its animation, Redline was unsuccessful at the box office. It saw greater success following its home release, and is considered a cult film.

== Plot ==
On the planet Dorothy, "Sweet" JP races in the Yellowline car race, the final elimination race to the most popular race in the galaxy, the Redline. JP's alien mechanic, Frisbee, watches the televised race along with a mafia boss, with whom they have fixed the race. When JP, who was supposed to come in 2nd place, attempts to win anyway, Frisbee resorts to remotely detonating an explosive hidden under JP's TransAM20000, thereby making Sonoshee "Cherry Boy Hunter" McLaren the final winner.

While recuperating from the explosion in a hospital, Frisbee tells JP he's off the hook with his bondsman. JP initially turns down the money but a crowd of reporters storms the hospital room where JP learns that he has been voted by popular demand for the Redline following the dropout of two qualifiers due to the revelation of the race's location being on Roboworld—a planet dominated by militant zealot cyborgs whose President has threatened to hang all involved with the Redline mothership if it appears out of hyperspace over their planet.

The racers prepare for Redline by camping out on EUЯPSS, a demilitarized moon of Roboworld occupied by refugees in the M-3 Nebula Federation. There, JP tries to sign his alien junk dealer Old Man Mole onto his team. Old Man Mole protests the presence of Frisbee on their team, and Frisbee's insistence on using a rare uncontrollable hyper-powered engine, but eventually gives in to JP's convincing. JP finds Sonoshee in a restaurant on the moon, where many of the racers are converging. Trava, a racer, is attacked by Little Deyzuna, a recently AWOL subordinate of Col. Volton, but the restaurant is soon raided by Col. Volton and a squad of Roboworld soldiers. Volton reminds the racers any Redline event will be repelled by the army and police before retrieving Deyzuna and leaving the damaged restaurant.

Fireworks celebrations and bookmaker agent desks break out on Roboworld despite the threats from the military, and are raided by deadly android police robots. Miners on Roboworld use their power suits to sabotage the military base's power station while the Race Commission hires Earth-native racing partners Lynchman and Johnny Boya to sabotage an Orbital Disintegration Cannon, which Secretary of Defense Titan plans to use to destroy the Redline mothership the instant it comes out of hyperspace.

While in hyperspace, the Princess from the planet Supergrass marks the race course on the military base with a pair of scout vessels. Unaware of the sabotage against the Orbital Disintegration Cannon, the President realizes the racers are on the planet after the cannon fails, and sends his troops en masse at the racers. The President becomes increasingly desperate as the racers evade them and approach the mine-laden Zone "Seven-Ex", lair of a secret illegal biological weapon named 'Funky Boy', who awakens from its stasis as the racers and the rebellious miners converge on it. With the several-hundred-foot-tall Funky Boy awakening and subsequent destruction of the base coinciding with the orbital cannon coming back online, the President orders Funky Boy to be fired upon. The explosion takes out most of the Roboworld troops while JP pushes to right his overturned car off its side. Sonoshee, her vehicle totaled, agrees to ride with him to the finish line as Funky Boy regenerates. Funky Boy is taken out by Col. Volton, who dangerously merges with another bioweapon to do so.

Frisbee watches the race in the mob boss's hovercraft, where he revives the same deal as Yellowline. Frisbee, however, refuses to detonate the explosive charge, wanting to see his friend win just one time. He is attacked by mobsters for his decision but is saved by Old Man Mole, who discovered Frisbee's sabotage, and kills the mob boss and his lackeys. As the race nears the finish line, long-time winner and Redline favorite Machinehead and JP race to the southern line, boosted by their rare Steamlight boosters. As they come to a desperate neck-and-neck finish, a drunken Old Man Mole accidentally detonates Frisbee's remote explosive, propelling JP and Sonoshee towards the finish line, thrown from their vehicle. The boost is enough and JP wins by the length of his long duck tail pompadour. As the racers rest at the end of the track amidst the ruins of Roboworld, JP and Sonoshee float back down to the ground kissing and declaring their love for each other.

== Cast ==
Character	Cast	
Character	Japanese	English dub
"Sweet" JP	Takuya Kimura (木村 拓哉, Kimura Takuya)	Patrick Seitz
Sonoshee McLaren	Yū Aoi (蒼井 優, Aoi Yū)	Michelle Ruff
Frisbee	Tadanobu Asano (浅野 忠信, Asano Tadanobu)	Liam O'Brien
Boiboi	Akane Sakai (阪井 あかね, Sakai Akane)	Lauren Landa
Bosbos	AKEMI (小林 明美, Kobayashi Akemi)	Laura Post
Inuki Boss	Chō (チョー)	Alfred Thor
Gori-Rider	Daisuke Gouri (郷里 大輔, Gōri Daisuke)	George C. Cole
Todoroki	Ikki Todoroki (轟木 一騎, Todoroki Ikki)	Cutter Garcia
Miki	Shunichiro Miki (三木 俊一郎, Miki Shunichiro)	Sam Riegel
Trava	Kanji Tsuda (津田 寛治, Tsuda Kanji)	Joey Morris
Shinkai	Yoshiyuki Morishita (森下 能幸, Morishita Yoshiyuki)	Tony Oliver
Secretary of Defense Titan	Kenyu Horiuchi (堀内 賢雄, Horiuchi Ken'yū)	Doug Erholtz
Colonel Volton	Unshō Ishizuka (石塚 運昇, Ishizuka Unshō)	Jamieson Price
Roboworld President	Kōsei Hirota (廣田 行生, Hirota Kōsei)	David Lodge
Machine Head	Kōji Ishii (石井 康嗣, Ishii Kōji)	Michael McConnohie
Old Man Mole	Takeshi Aono (青野 武, Aono Takeshi)	Steve Kramer
Lynchman	Tatsuya Gashuin (我修院 達也, Gashūin Tatsuya)	John White
Johnny Boya	Yoshinori Okada (岡田 義徳, Okada Yoshinori)	David Roach
Little Deyzuna	Kenta Miyake (三宅 健太, Miyake Kenta)	Derek Stephen Prince

== Development and release ==
In 2003, prior to Redline's production and release, a prelude anime OVA entitled Trava: Fist Planet was released, featuring two characters (Trava and Shinkai) who would reappear as key characters in Redline.

Redline was produced by Madhouse, and directed by Takeshi Koike, who also drew the storyboards and served as unit director and animation director. The film's producers were Yukiko Koike and Kentarō Yoshida. Masahiro Fukushima served as executive producer. The task of writing the script was shared by Yoji Enokido, Katsuhito Ishii, and Yoshiki Sakurai. The film's character designs, original and otherwise, were done by Katsuhito Ishii, who also served as one of the film's sound directors, the other being Youji Shimizu. The film's music was composed by James Shimoji. According to Tim Maughan of Anime News Network, Redline was released several years later than originally planned. Its development took seven years and used 100,000 hand-made drawings, which Maughan notes is all the more unusual as it is Koike's directorial debut.

Redline was initially meant to premiere at the 2009 Annecy International Animated Film Festival and follow Summer Wars, Mai Mai Miracle, and Yona Yona Penguin as the fourth and final feature film Madhouse planned to release between summer 2009 and spring 2010. Instead, it premiered during the 62nd Locarno Film Festival in August of the same year. Several more advance screenings were done at international film festivals during 2010. In May, Redline was shown during the Sci-Fi-London 9. In June, it participated in Annecy 2010 in the category "Feature Films out of competition". During September, it was shown in Australia and New Zealand as part of Reel Anime 2010. Redline was shown in Austin, Texas, on September 23, and in Edinburgh, Scotland, on October 15 as part of the Scotland Loves Anime film festival. At the 2010 Nantes Utopiales Sci-Fi festival, the film received the special mention of jury and public. The film opened in Japan on October 9, 2010. Coinciding with this, the film was shown in a San Francisco-based Viz Cinema theater from October 8–14, 2010. Distribution in North America is handled by Manga Entertainment. It was the last new product released through the American division of Manga before they ceased distributing new titles in the States.

== Soundtrack ==
An official soundtrack to the film by James Shimoji (ジェイムス下地) was released under GBC label on October 6, 2010 and contains 42 tracks. It ranked 207th on Oricon's album chart.

Track listing: Redline Original Soundtrack
No.	Title	Length
1.	"Yellow Line"	6:59
2.	"Inuki"	0:52
3.	"Redline Title"	0:48
4.	"Boy's Memory"	0:54
5.	"Winner March"	0:43
6.	"Roboworld TV"	0:34
7.	"TV Show"	2:27
8.	"Roboworld"	2:07
9.	"Europass"	3:17
10.	"Mogura Oyaji"	2:20
11.	"Oasis"	2:07
12.	"And It's So Beautiful (feat. Kitty Brown)"	4:49
13.	"Shinkai"	2:23
14.	"Machine Head"	1:02
15.	"Capture Operation"	2:18
16.	"Let Me Love You (feat. Veronica Torraca-Bragdon)"	2:25
17.	"Get The Stones (feat. Andrew O. Jones)"	3:23
18.	"Crab Sonoshee"	1:36
19.	"彼のシフトはブンブンブン (feat. Super Boins)"	3:47
20.	"Lynch Man & Johnny Boya"	1:16
21.	"Redline News"	0:22
22.	"Gori-Rider"	0:56
23.	"Miki & Todoroki"	0:23
24.	"Put-up Guy"	0:41
25.	"Red Angels"	0:48
26.	"Three-point Decomposition Cannon"	0:53
27.	"Tension"	1:37
28.	"Chatter Void"	1:05
29.	"Volton Unit"	2:06
30.	"Vertical Drop"	1:40
31.	"Moniter Room"	1:06
32.	"Sand Biker"	1:28
33.	"Spinning Car"	1:52
34.	"Trouble"	1:33
35.	"Semimaru"	1:26
36.	"Gangster"	0:52
37.	"Flying Finger"	0:23
38.	"Funky Boy"	1:41
39.	"Redline"	3:30
40.	"Exceed Limit"	1:32
41.	"Dead Heat"	1:02
42.	"Redline Day (feat. Rob Laufer)"	4:52

== Reception ==
=== Accolades ===
Redline was awarded the 62nd Locarno International Film Festival Piazza Grande Division Official Screening UTOPIALES Audience Award in 2010.

=== Critical response ===
Redline was unsuccessful at the box office. It saw greater success following its home release and critical reviews and is considered a cult film. On review aggregator Rotten Tomatoes, the film holds 70% approval rating based on 10 reviews, with an average rating of 6.8/10.

Tim Maughan of Anime News Network gave it a A+, and describes the film as "something very special, very different, and insanely exhilarating." In particular he praises the film's director, saying that "Koike has managed to make all this chaos believable." He goes on to say that "Redline is animation not only at its best, but also largely animation for animation's sake." Although Maughan says some may dislike its techno soundtrack and "minimal plot," he calls Redline "the most insanely exciting, visually exhilarating anime film you've seen in decades." Tim Jones of THEM Anime Reviews gave the film 5 out of 5 stars. Jones praised the film for its great sense of humor, outstanding animation and characters. Saying that "Redline is an unforgettable anime experience, It's brilliantly animated and drawn, features two cool, intelligent, fun leads". Jones concluded: "Redline is one of the best examples of this not from Studio Ghibli I can think of. It's an anime for grown-ups, no kids or grown-up kids. It's beautiful, gripping, and fun. I give it high recommendations!".

Thomas Zoth of Mania.com comments that while the film does not provide "a deep plot or unique premise," it still "demands to be seen." He said that if Scott Pilgrim vs. the World was "an assault on the senses ... Redline is a declaration of war." Zoth went on to praise the film for its "imaginative creatures and clever designs", to compare Koike's work to that of Quentin Tarantino, and to compliment the film for its "soundtrack, with its memorable high-energy tracks that greatly complement the chaos onscreen." He concludes by saying that if "the life of the industry has been drained and replaced with rote, cookiecutter shows-by-committee, Redline shows a path out." Nicolas Penedo of the French magazine Animeland describes it as the "Paris-Dakar revisited à la Ōban Star-Racers", a remake of Hanna-Barbera Wacky Races with arts inspired from Jack Kirby comics and know-how, rhythm and energy inherent of the best Japanese anime movies. The reviewer praises the animation quality as breathtaking, and declares that Takeshi Koike made an homage to comics and films of the 70s and 80s.

Kwenton Bellette and Peter Martin reviewed Redline for Twitch Film. Bellette describes it as a "truly out of this world experience", "Speed Racer on crack" and praised the supporting characters for being memorable and the background galaxy made of different races and creeds to be very solid. Martin expresses that "it feels like every centimeter of every frame is filled with some kind of kinetic color or action or bit of business, making it an experience that is sure to overload the senses" and asserts that writer Katsuhito Ishii succeeds at making a feature-length anime as insane as his film Funky Forest. Jon Liang of UK Anime Network comments that "A sense of the cool and outrageous is seeped into every pore of the design, ... exaggerated is an understatement here", and notes that the film's "cinema-quality smooth animation" makes "even the most alien of things move naturally and the sense of speed that is often achieved is frequently mind-blowing." He remarks that "the visuals and over-the-top action will most likely overload sensitive brain cells," but concludes by calling Redline "an incredibly exciting cinematic experience that doesn't take itself at all seriously."
