= Dejima (disambiguation) =

Dejima may mean or lead to:

- Dejima, a small, fan-shaped artificial island built in the bay of Nagasaki
- Dejima, the Japan branding of Guerrilla Games' proprietary game engine
- Dejima Takeharu, former sumo wrestler from Kanazawa
- Dejima Japanese Film Festival, a former film festival named after the island, Dejima
