= Wkw/tk/1996@7′55″hk.net =

1996 Hong Kong short film by Wong Kar-wai

wkw/tk/1996@7′55″hk.net
- Directed by: Wong Kar-wai
- Starring: Tadanobu Asano; Karen Mok
- Cinematography: Christopher Doyle
- Release date: 1996
- Running time: 7 minutes 55 seconds
- Country: Hong Kong

wkw/tk/1996@7′55″hk.net is a 1996 commercial short film by Hong Kong director Wong Kar-wai that he made for Japanese fashion designer Takeo Kikuchi. The title contains the initials of Wong Kar-wai and Takeo Kikuchi, the year of release, the length, 7 minutes 55 seconds, and "hk" for Hong Kong.

It features Japanese actor Tadanobu Asano and Hong Kong actress Karen Mok. Photography is by Wong's stock cinematographer, Australian expatriate Christopher Doyle. The film is very much in keeping with Wong's style. There are several versions of the film, originally two otherwise identical versions were released with different soundtracks to lay emphasis on the perspectives of the male and female character respectively. There are several versions of the film that have been aired as television commercials. These are available on the Japanese laserdisc release of Wong's Fallen Angels (1995), as well as various bootlegged VCD releases of Wong's features.
