= Emara (web series) =

2018 Arabic animated superhero series

- Genre: Science fiction; Adventure; Superhero
- Created by: Fatma Almheiri; Maryam Alatouly
- Developed by: Ahamad Beyrouthi
- Directed by: Fatma Almheiri
- Voices of: Naomi Mercer; Paul Poteet
- Composer: Mahmoud Altaf
- Country of origin: United Arab Emirates
- Original language: Arabic
- No. of seasons: 1
- No. of episodes: 5

Production
- Executive producers: Maryam Alatouly; Fatman Almhele; Ahamad Beyrouthi
- Animator: Sun Creature
- Production company: Eating Stars Studios

Original release
- Network: YouTube
- Release: May 18 – June 15, 2018

Emara (also known as Emara: Emirates Hero) is an Arabic animated web series created by Fatima Al-Mahari and produced by Eating Star Studios, with a team from across the Arab world. the series tells the origin story of Emara, a young Emirati girl who harnesses a special power to fight crime across the Emirates.

== Plot ==
The first homegrown female Emirati superhero, Emara is gaining attention around the world. By day, she's a typical teenage girl named Moza. By night, her fearless alter ego fights crime on the teeming streets of the United Arab Emirates.

== Characters ==
=== Main characters ===
Mora/Emara
Voiced by Salha Al-Hassan (Arabic), Naomi Mercer (English)

By day, she's a well meaning but clumsy girl who works at her mother's cafe.

Dhabian/Sultan
Voiced by Paul Poteet (English)

He is working for a mysterious organization that assigned him to get close with Emara

=== Organization characters ===
- Tara Platt as Zeina, Dhabian's boss. She's a calm and calculating woman with an unflinching goal: to get close to Emara and discover her secrets before anyone else.
- Brad Smith as Ali, Zeina's second in command.

== Production ==
Emara was conceived by Fatma Almheiri, a UAE-based director, producer, and comic artist, as the first animated series featuring a Middle Eastern female superhero aimed at inspiring young girls through positive representation. Almheiri developed the concept in December 2015 while studying animation at age 21, drawing from her childhood frustration over the lack of relatable Arab and Muslim characters in Western media, which she sought to address by creating a hijab-wearing vigilante who embodies empowerment without conforming to stereotypical tropes. The creative team, led by Almheiri as director and including art director Ahmad Beirouthy, blended influences from retro Japanese anime—such as the fluid character development in series like Michiko & Hatchin and styles from Studio Trigger and Masaaki Yuasa—with elements of Emirati culture to craft an authentic narrative.

== Episodes ==
No.	Title	Original release date
1	"Episode 1"	May 18, 2018
2	"Episode 2"	May 25, 2018
3	"Episode 3"	June 1, 2018
4	"Episode 4"	June 8, 2018
5	"Episode 5"	June 15, 2018

== Future ==
On December 1, 2018, the creative team shared an update teasing a new character named Dhalia and status updates regarding the project's progression or second-season rollout.

As of 2025, the series remains on hiatus with no announced plans for a second season.

== See also ==
- Re: Cutie Honey Served as inspiration
- Miraculous Ladybug Served as inspiration
