= Shie Kohinata =

Japanese actress, tarento, and singer (born 1979)

- 小日向 しえ
- Born: 8 October 1979 (age 46); Tokyo, Japan
- Occupations: Actress; tarento; singer
- Years active: 1994–
- Agent: Freelance
- Notable work: Shark Skin Man and Peach Hip Girl (1999)
- Television: Cocorico Miracle Type
- Height: 167.5 cm (5 ft 5.9 in)
- Spouse: Naoki Tanaka (m. 2003; div. 2017)
- Children: 2

Shie Kohinata (小日向 しえ, Kohinata Shie; born 8 October 1979) is a Japanese actress, tarento, and singer. Born in from Tokyo, she has one younger brother and was formerly represented by Space Craft.

== Career ==
At the age of fifteen she met her father's acquaintance production president, and debuted as a model at Soen. After working as a model in female magazines such as Olive and an an, she became an actress, appearing in films, television dramas, and variety shows.

Since 1997, she has performed as a singer, releasing six single songs and one album from Victor Entertainment.

As an actor, her primary roles have been as young office ladies, young wives, Yankee women, etc. She has appeared in female teams with Yuki Matsushita, Maki Sakai and others.

After getting married, she left the program on 4 June 2003 in order to concentrate on her music career.

In the Downtown no Gaki no Tsukai ya Arahende!! (Nippon TV) corner "Waratte haikenai Series", apart from Matsumoto and Yamazaki, the "(original) wives" (Natsumi Ogawa, Chiaki) had appeared, although only "Tanaka's wife" had not appeared for a long time. With the 2012 broadcast, in the office of the school official Miyuki Oshima she first appeared as a woman wrapped in a mysterious Man in the Iron Mask fighting Goriraimo.

== Private life ==
It was posted in the photograph that Cocorico's Naoki Tanaka co-starred in the Fuji Television variety Cocorico Miracle Type and dating in Amagasaki, Hyōgo Prefecture to the magazine Friday at the end of 2002, Tanaka told that "Masayuki and Oshima are my work colleagues to the last", but announced that they will get married in the public place at the end of May 2003, and married in June 2003. They gave birth to their first son in June 2004 and their second son in April 2008.

They later divorced on 2 May 2017. Tanaka announced the divorce through the office and Tanaka had custody of their eldest and second son.

== Casting works ==
=== Variety/music programmes ===
- Cocorico Miracle Type (CX, Apr 2001 – Jun 2003)
- Matahari (Space Shower TV) After Hiromix the second generation assistant MC (MC of the same programme Pierre Taki, Month 1 Guest: Lily Franky)
- Dynamo (Space Shower TV) MC with You The Rock
- Zenkoku Issei! Nihonjin Test, narrator
- Ichihachi, guest
- Dancing Sanma Palace (5 Jun 2012, NTV)
- Zettai ni Warattehaikenai Nekketsu Kyōshi 24-ji (31 Dec 2012, NTV)
- Zettai ni Warattehaikenai Chikyū Bōei-gun 24-ji (31 Dec 2012, NTV)

=== TV dramas ===
- Watashi Umi (Sep 2003, CX) – as Sachiko
- Cocorico Miracle Type Drama Special "A Woman to be Beaten" (15 Feb 2006) Appearance for 2 years and 7 months
- Kaette ko sase rareta 33-bu Tantei (28 Mar 2009) Episode 10 as Crystal Fortress Misato
- Arienai! (3 Mar 2010, MBS) Episode 8 as Hitomi Mochizuki

=== TV anime ===
- Oden-kun (Ganguro Tamago-chan) NHK E TV, 2005–09
- Michiko & Hatchin (Pepe Rima) CX, 2008
- Ganbare! Oden-kun (Ganguro Tamago-chan) ABC, since 2013

=== Films ===
- Shark Skin Man and Peach Hip Girl (1999 Director: Katsuhito Ishii) – as Toshiko Momojiri
- Cutie Honey (2004 Director: Hideaki Anno) – as Cobalt Claw/Rinko Terada (filming was done in late 2003 and temporarily paused entertainment activities after the shooting ended)

=== Stage ===
- Job&Baby (2007 Production: Hiko Miyoshi Planning/Staging/Screenplay: Mariko Akama) this became her main performance simultaneously with her first stage appearance

=== Advertisements ===
- East Japan Railway Company "New Trip"
- Asahi Breweries Chemicals "High Choice"
- Sony "PlayStation"
- Kao Corporation "Will"
- Mitsubishi Motors "Pajero Mini"
- Lotte "Toppo"
- Ad Council Japan (At the time: Public Advertisement Organization) "Look at Your Manners: A Woman at an Intersection" (2001)

=== Direct-to-video ===
- Ryūsei Kachō (Jidō Door no Maria) short film magazine Grasshoppa! Vol.3 recording (2002 directed by Hideaki Anno)

== Discography ==
=== Singles ===
- Plum (21 May 1998)
- Kanashii Uta (21 Nov 1998)
- Hana Tsumami (21 Feb 2001)
- Kizuato (22 Aug 2001)
- Pistol (21 Aug 2002)
- Hoshi no Tattoo (19 Feb 2003)
- Natsu no Zangai (21 Aug 2003)

=== Albums ===
- Renai Machine–Play Me (21 May 1997) mini album

=== Photo albums ===
- 15-sai -Super Fifteen- (Aug 1995: Scola issue) – in the name Shoko Iwasaki

=== Others ===
- Tomofumi Tanizawa 2nd full album Nihon ni Ochite kita Otoko (23 Feb 2011)
  - Co-written lyrics with recorded song "Kekkon desu", and participated in singing.
