= Shark Skin Man and Peach Hip Girl =

- Film poster
- Original title: 鮫肌男と桃尻女
- Directed by: Katsuhito Ishii
- Written by: Katsuhito Ishii; Minetaro Mochizuki (manga)
- Produced by: Hilo Iizumi; Kazuto Takida
- Starring: Tadanobu Asano; Shie Kohinata
- Distributed by: Tidepoint Pictures
- Release date: 1999 (Japan)
- Running time: 108 minutes
- Language: Japanese

Shark Skin Man and Peach Hip Girl (Japanese: 鮫肌男と桃尻女, Hepburn: Samehada Otoko to Momojiri Onna) is a 1999 Japanese film directed by Katsuhito Ishii and starring Tadanobu Asano. It is based on a manga of the same name by Minetaro Mochizuki which was originally serialized in Mister Magazine circa 1993 under the title "Daisharin" (Big Wheel). The current title was adopted when the comic was published as its own book.

== Plot ==
Kuroo Samehada (Tadanobu Asano), a yakuza soldier, is on the run for his life after stealing from his boss Tanuki Fukuda (Ittoku Kishibe). During a chase through a forest, Tanuki's car is struck by a SUV. Enter Toshiko Momojiri (Shie Kohinata), who is also on the run. She is trying to escape her twisted uncle Michio Sonezaki (Yohachi Shimida), who manages the hotel where she works and who has developed a controlling sexual obsession with her. During the crash Toshiko is knocked unconscious, and Samehada is able to escape with Toshiko in tow.

The couple are then chased across Japan by a large cast of gun crazy, deadpan gang members dressed in over-the-top, high-end fashion. They are also being followed by Yamada, an amateur hit man, who was hired by Michio to bring Toshiko back.

== Cast ==
- Tadanobu Asano as Kuroo Samehada
- Shie Kohinata as Toshiko Momojiri
- Ittoku Kishibe as Tanuki Fukuda
- Susumu Terajima as Sawada
- Kimie Shingyoji as Mitsuko Fukuda
- Youhachi Shimada as Michio Sonezaki
- Tatsuya Gashuin as Yamada
- Shingo Tsurumi as Mitsuru Fukuda

=== The Yakuza hitmen ===
- Daigaku Sekine as Sakaguchi
- Koh Takasugi as Sorimachi
- Shingoro Yamada as Taniguchi
- Hitoshi Kiyokawa as Maruo
- Yoji Tanaka as Asahina
- Keisuke Horibe as Inuzuka
- Yoshiyuki Morishita as Hidari
- Kanji Tsuda as Fukazume

== Release ==
The film was shown at the 1998 Toronto International Film Festival.

== Bibliography ==
- Puchalski, Steve (2000). "Shark Skin Man and Peach Hip Girl: Review and Commentary". Asian Cult Cinema. 28 (3rd Quarter): 37–39.
