= Like Grains of Sand =

- DVD Cover of an Asian release
- Directed by: Ryosuke Hashiguchi
- Written by: Ryosuke Hashiguchi
- Produced by: Kiyomi Kanazawa; Yūka Nakazawa; Hideyuki Takai; Hiroshi Yanai
- Starring: Yoshinori Okada; Ayumi Hamasaki; Kumi Takada; Kōji Yamaguchi
- Cinematography: Shogo Ueno
- Edited by: Miho Yoneda
- Music by: Kazuya Takahashi
- Distributed by: Toho Company; PIA Corporation; Pierre Grise Distribution
- Release date: December 16, 1995 (Japan)
- Running time: 129 minutes
- Country: Japan
- Language: Japanese

Like Grains of Sand (Japanese: 渚のシンドバッド, Hepburn: Nagisa no Shindobaddo; lit. Sinbad of the Seashore) is a Japanese drama film released on December 16, 1995 by Toho Company Ltd. The film was directed and written by Ryosuke Hashiguchi and features a lead role played by Japan's highest selling female musician Ayumi Hamasaki. It won three major awards in 1996 and 1997 including an award for best screenplay and two international awards. It was featured in the 1996 Toronto International Film Festival in Canada as well as the 1997 International Gay and Lesbian Film Festival in Turin, Italy.

== Synopsis ==
Shuji Ito (Yoshinori Okada) is a shy boy in the top class at secondary school. He feels attracted to his classmate and best friend Yoshida (Kōta Kusano), who is not aware of Ito's intimate feelings. The two spend time with Tōru Kanbara (Kōji Yamaguchi), whose comic actions hide his sensitive nature. Kasane Aihara (Ayumi Hamasaki) is new at school and remains aloof with her cool attitude. No one knows that at her previous school she was raped and is now in therapy. Meanwhile, Yoshida, who is currently involved with the insecure Shimizu, is interested in Aihara, the mysterious new girl. Each teen is hiding behind a wall which they must break through during this tough process of maturation.

== Cast ==
- Yoshinori Okada as Shuji Ito
- Ayumi Hamasaki as Kasane Aihara
- Kōji Yamaguchi as Tōru Kanbara
- Kumi Takada as Ayako Shimizu
- Shizuka Isami as Rika Matsuo
- Kōta Kusano as Hiroyuki Yoshida
- Yoshihiko Hakamada as Fujita

== Awards ==
Mainichi Film Concours
1996 - Best Screenplay

Rotterdam International Film Festival
1996 - Tiger Award

Torino International Gay & Lesbian Film Festival
1997 - Best Feature Film
