= Blood (2009 film) =

- Film poster
- Directed by: Ten Shimoyama
- Written by: Shigenori Takechi
- Produced by: Shigeji Maeda; Tsuneo Seto; Kazuyuki Yokoyama
- Starring: Aya Sugimoto; Kanji Tsuda; Jun Kaname
- Cinematography: Gen Kobayashi
- Edited by: Seigo Hirasawa; Ten Shimoyama
- Music by: Kiyoshi Yoshikawa
- Production company: Blood Film Partners
- Release date: April 29, 2009 (Japan)
- Running time: 85 minutes
- Country: Japan
- Language: Japanese

Blood (Japanese: Blood ブラッド, Hepburn: Buraddo) is a 2009 Japanese supernatural action vampire horror/martial arts film, directed by Ten Shimoyama. The film was produced by Aya Pro Company, Rakuei-sha, and There's Enterprise.

== Cast ==
- Aya Sugimoto as Miyako Rozmberk
- Kanji Tsuda as Detective Hoshino
- Jun Kaname as Ukyo Kuronuma
