= Tadanobu Asano =

Japanese actor (born 1973)

- 浅野 忠信
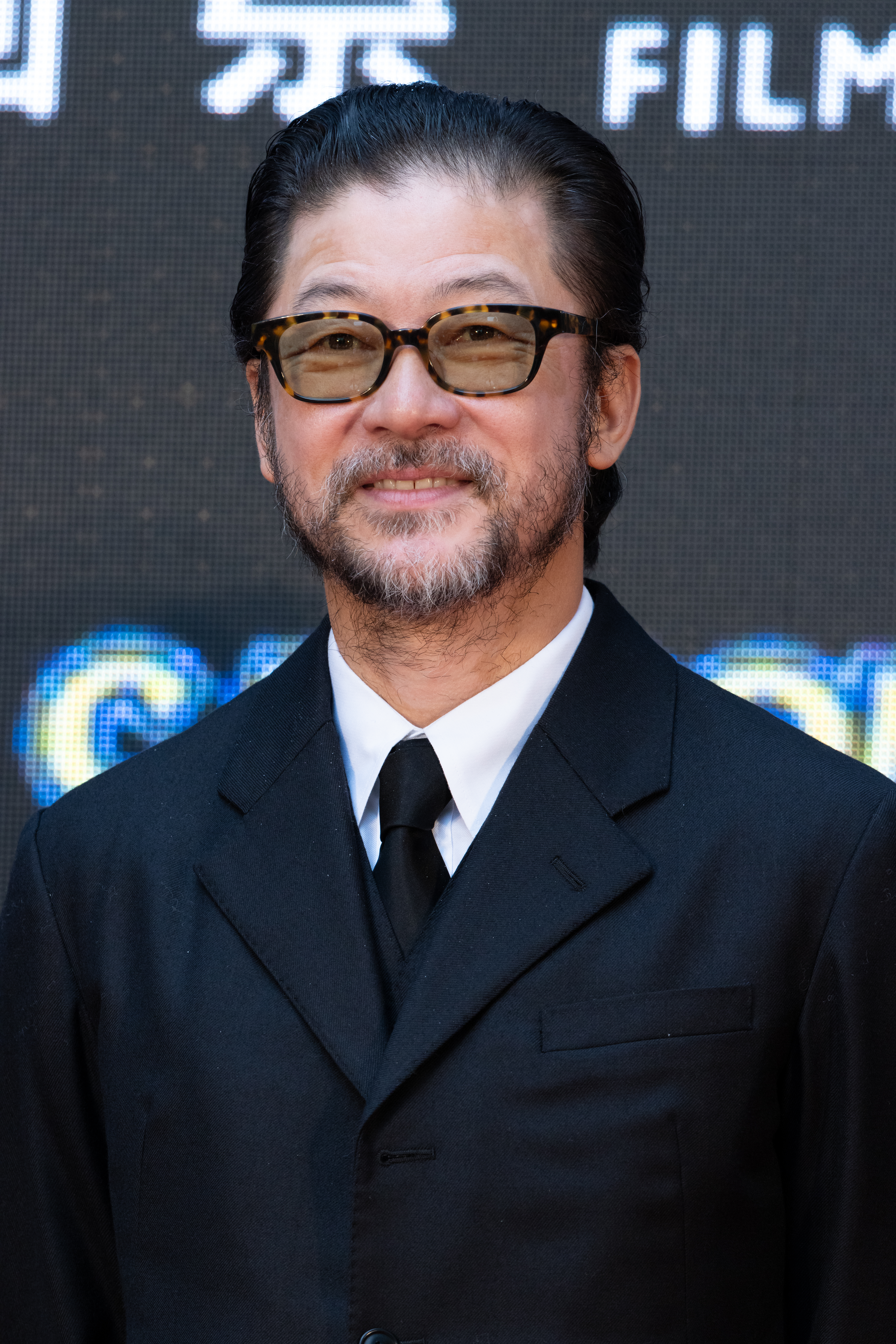
- Asano at the 37th Tokyo International Film Festival in 2024
- Born: Tadanobu Satō; November 27, 1973 (age 52); Yokohama, Kanagawa, Japan
- Occupations: Actor; director; musician
- Years active: 1988–present
- Spouses: Chara (m. 1995; div. 2009) Kurumi Nakata (m. 2022)
- Children: 2

Japanese name
- Kanji: 浅野 忠信
- Hiragana: あさの ただのぶ
- Katakana: アサノ タダノブ
Transcriptions
- Romanization: Asano Tadanobu

Alternative Japanese name
- Kanji: 佐藤 忠信
- Hiragana: さとう ただのぶ
- Katakana: サトウ タダノブ
Transcriptions
- Romanization: Satō Tadanobu
- Website: asanotadanobu.com

Tadanobu Satō (佐藤 忠信, Satō Tadanobu; born November 27, 1973), better known by his stage name Tadanobu Asano (浅野 忠信, Asano Tadanobu), is a Japanese actor, director, and musician, who has had an extensive career working in both Japanese and international cinema. He has been nominated for five Japan Academy Film Prizes, twice for Best Actor and three times for Best Supporting Actor, and is a winner of its Most Popular Performer award.

Among his best-known roles are in Hirokazu Kore-eda's Maboroshi no Hikari (1995) and Distance (2001), Hyozo Tashiro in Gohatto (1999), Kakihara in Ichi the Killer (2001), Hattori Genosuke in Zatoichi (2003), Kenji in Last Life in the Universe (also 2003), and Temujin in Mongol (2007). He has also appeared in Hollywood films, notably as Hogun in the Marvel Cinematic Universe, Lord Kira Yoshinaka in 47 Ronin (2013), the Interpreter in Silence (2016), Rear Admiral Tamon Yamaguchi in Midway (2019), and Raiden in Mortal Kombat (2021), based on the fighting video game of the same name. He gained additional recognition in 2024 for his portrayal of Lord Kashigi Yabushige on the American television series Shōgun, based on the James Clavell novel, for which he won the Golden Globe Award for Best Supporting Actor – Series, Miniseries or Television Film.

Asano has worked with some of the most prominent and acclaimed directors in Japanese cinema, including Hirokazu Kore-eda, Takeshi Kitano, Nagisa Ōshima, Takashi Miike, Nobuhiko Obayashi and Kiyoshi Kurosawa, along with international directors Martin Scorsese, Kenneth Branagh, Wong Kar-wai, Roland Emmerich, Pen-ek Ratanaruang and Sergei Bodrov. Among other accolades, he has twice won the Best Actor Award at the Yokohama Film Festival, the Upstream Prize for Best Actor at the Venice Film Festival, and the Best Actor Award at the Moscow International Film Festival.

== Early life ==
Asano was born in the Honmoku area of Yokohama, to artist Yukihisa Satō (佐藤 幸久, Satō Yukihisa) and mother Junko (順子). Through his mother, Asano is of one-quarter American ancestry. His maternal grandfather was Willard Overing, a U.S. citizen of Norwegian and Dutch descent, whom Asano never met. Asano has an older brother, Kujun Satō, born in 1971, who is a musician and a partner in Anore Inc. (now Adonis A), a talent agency Asano and their father Yukihisa Satō founded.

== Career ==
Asano's father, an actors' agent, suggested he take on his first acting role in the TV show Kinpachi Sensei at the age of 16. His film debut was in 1990's Bataashi Kingyo (lit. "Flutter Kick Goldfish", but given the English-language title Swimming Upstream) based on the manga series of the same title, though his first major critical success was in Shunji Iwai's Fried Dragon Fish (1993). His first critical success internationally was Hirokazu Kore-eda's Maboroshi no Hikari (1995), in which he played a man who inexplicably throws himself in front of a train, widowing his wife and orphaning his infant son. He also worked with Kore-eda in the pseudo-documentary Distance in 2001. His best known works internationally are the samurai films Gohatto (aka Taboo, 1999) and Zatoichi (2003), as well as the critically acclaimed Bright Future.

Asano acted in Katsuhito Ishii's 2003 film The Taste of Tea, which premiered at the 2004 Cannes Film Festival. He appeared as the lead actor in Last Life in the Universe (2003) by Thai director Pen-Ek Ratanaruang and starred in Ratanaruang's 2006 follow-up film, Invisible Waves. In 2007, he starred as the young Genghis Khan in Sergei Bodrov's Oscar-nominated film Mongol. In Villon's Wife (2009), he played the part of an alcoholic writer, stating that, since he doesn't drink alcohol, he based his performance on people he knew. In 2011, he starred in the Marvel Studios film Thor as the Asgardian warrior Hogun, a member of the Warriors Three and companion to Thor. He reprised the role in 2013's Thor: The Dark World and 2017's Thor: Ragnarok.

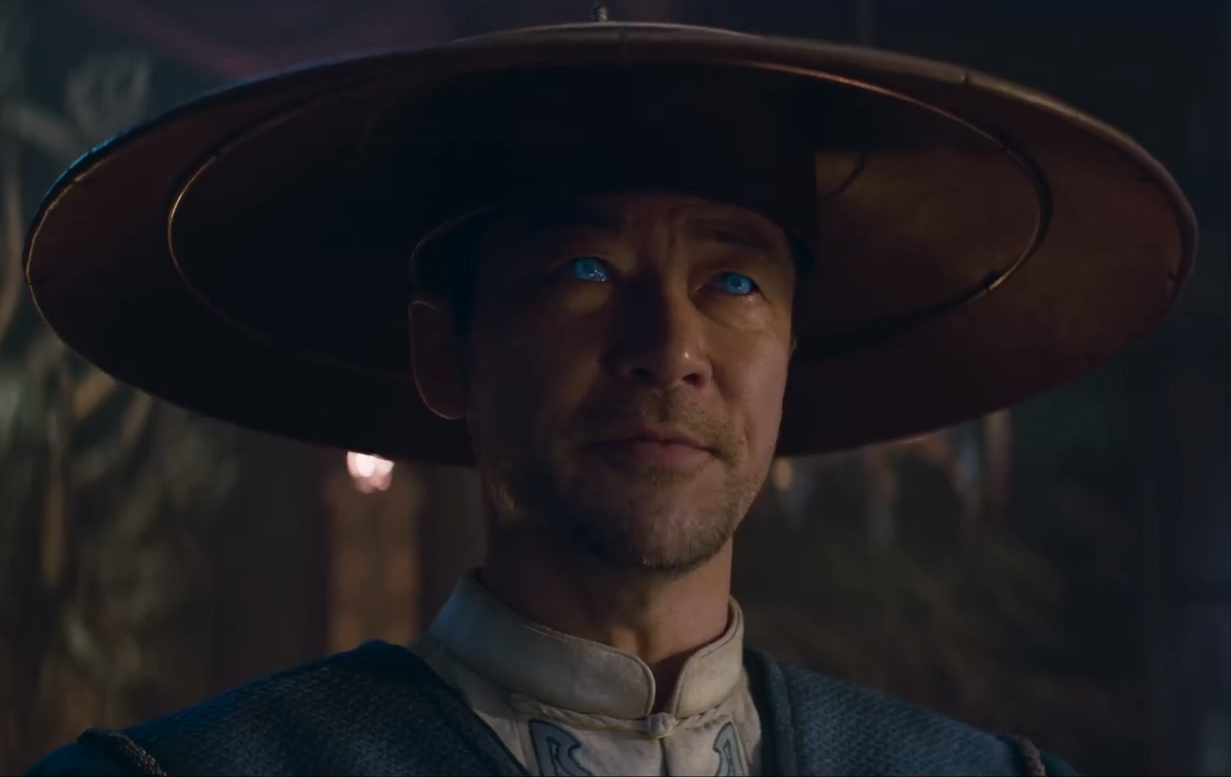
Asano as Raiden in Mortal Kombat II (2026)

Asano appeared in the 2021 Mortal Kombat reboot as Raiden. In September 2021, Asano was announced as part of the cast of the FX limited series Shōgun, adapted from the James Clavell novel of the same name.

In addition to his acting career, Asano directed commercial TV spots for his then-wife, Chara. He formed the band MACH-1.67 with director Sogo Ishii in 1996 and has also played in the bands Peace Pill and Safari. He is an artist and a model, most notably for Japanese fashion designers Jun Takahashi and Takeo Kikuchi, for whom he filmed a series of commercial spots directed by Wong Kar-wai, including the short film wkw/tk/1996@7′55″hk.net.

Asano and his father left the actors' agency Anore Inc. (now Adonis A) in 2022. After leaving the agency, he continued to give it his support.

== Personal life ==
Asano met J-pop singer Chara on the set of Iwai's Picnic (1994). They were married in March 1995 while Chara was pregnant with their first child, a daughter named Sumire, who was born on July 4 that same year. In 1999, they had a son named Himi. In July 2009, Chara announced on her website that the couple was divorcing. She received custody of both their children.

In August 2022, Asano announced through his Twitter and Instagram accounts that he had married model and actress Kurumi Nakata, who is eighteen years younger than him (b. 1991). The two had reportedly been in a relationship for over six years.

== Awards ==
Asano won the Most Popular Performer award at the 1997 Japanese Academy Awards for Acri and was nominated in the Best Supporting Actor category in 2004 for his performance in Zatôichi. He also received the Upstream Prize for Best Actor at the 2003 Venice Film Festival for his role in Last Life in the Universe. In 2014, he won the award for Best Actor at the 36th Moscow International Film Festival for his role in My Man. In 2024, he was nominated Outstanding Supporting Actor in a Drama Series in 76th Primetime Emmy Awards for his performance in Shōgun, his first nomination for the Primetime Emmy Awards.

Award	Year	Category	Nominated work	Result	Ref.
Primetime Emmy Awards	2024	Outstanding Supporting Actor in a Drama Series	Shōgun	Nominated	
Golden Globe Awards	2025	Best Supporting Actor in a Series, Limited Series, Anthology Series, or Motion Picture Made for Television	Shōgun	Won	
Critics' Choice Awards	2025	Best Supporting Actor in a Drama Series	Shōgun	Won	
Independent Spirit Awards	2025	Best Supporting Performance in a New Scripted Series	Shōgun	Nominated	

== Filmography ==
=== Film ===
Year	Title	Role	Notes	Ref.
1990	Bataashi Kingyo	Ushi		
1991	Aitsu	Sadahito Iwata		
1992	Seishun Dendekedekedeke	Seiichi Shirai		
1993	Nemuranai Machi: Shinjuku Same	Koichi Sunagami		
1994	119	Satoshi Matsushita		
1995	Yonshimai Monogatari	Akira Higuchi		
1995	Maborosi	Ikuo		
1996	wkw/tk/1996@7′55″hk.net	Man	Short film	
1996	Picnic	Tsumuji		
1996	Helpless	Kenji Shiraishi		
1996	Acri	Hisoka		
1996	Swallowtail Butterfly	Customer in club		
1996	Focus	Kanemura		
1997	Yume no Ginga	Tatsuo Niitaka		
1997	Tokyo Biyori			
1998	Typhoon Shelter		TV movie	
1998	Love & Pop	Captain XX		
1998	Screwed	Tsube		
1998	Shark Skin Man and Peach Hip Girl	Kuroo Samehada		
1998	Rakka Suru Yugata			
1999	Away with Words	Asano Takashi		
1999	Gemini	Revenger with Sword		
1999	Hakuchi	Isawa		
1999	One Step on a Mine, It's All Over	Taizo Ichinose		
1999	Gohatto	Samurai Hyozo Tashiro		
2000	Gojoe: Spirit War Chronicle	Shanao		
2000	Kaza-hana	Sawaki		
2000	Party 7	Okita Souji		
2001	Electric Dragon 80.000 V	Dragon Eye Morrison		
2001	Distance	Sakata		
2001	Ichi the Killer	Kakihara		
2002	Woman of Water	Yusaku		
2003	Bright Future	Mamoru Arita		
2003	My Grandpa	S. Nakatoh		
2003	Last Life in the Universe	Kenji		
2003	Zatoichi	Hattori Gennosuke		
2003	Dead End Run			
2003	Café Lumière	Hajime Takeuchi		
2004	Tori		Short film	
2004	The Taste of Tea	Ayano, the Uncle		
2004	Vital	Hiroshi Takagi		
2004	The Face of Jizo	Kinoshita		
2004	Survive Style 5+	Aman		
2005	The Buried Forest	San-chan		
2005	Takeshis'			
2005	My God, My God, Why Hast Thou Forsaken Me?	Mizui		
2005	Portrait of the Wind	Tamio Murase		
2005	Funky Forest	Masaru Tanaka		
2005	Rampo Noir	Kogorô Akechi/Man/Masaki		
2005	Tokyo Zombie	Fujio		
2006	Invisible Waves	Kyôji		
2006	Hana	Jubei Kanazawa		
2007	Mongol	Temujin		
2007	Sad Vacation	Kenji Shiraishi		
2008	Kabei: Our Mother	Yamazaki Toru		
2008	R246 Story			
2008	Yume no Mani Mani	Black Marketeer		
2009	42 One Dream Rush		Short film	
2009	Mt. Tsurugidake	Shibasaki		
2009	Dumbeast	Dekogawa		
2009	Redline	Frisbee (voice)	Japanese-language version	
2009	Villon's Wife	Otani		
2009	Snow Prince	Haigo		
2010	Wandering Home	Yasuyuki Tsukahara		
2010	Vengeance Can Wait	Hidenori Yamane		
2011	Gekkō no Kamen	Okamoto		
2011	Thor	Hogun		
2011	Korede Iinoda! Eiga Akatsuka Fujio	Fujio Akatsuka		
2011	A Ghost of a Chance	Ken'ichi Kido		
2012	Battleship	Captain Yugi Nagata		
2012	Anata e			
2012	A Terminal Trust	Takai		
2012	Fly with the Gold	Kitagawa		
2013	Thor: The Dark World	Hogun		
2013	47 Ronin	Lord Kira		
2013	The Kiyosu Conference	Maeda Toshiie		
2014	Lupin III	Inspector Koichi Zenigata		
2014	Kiki's Delivery Service	Dr. Ishi		
2014	Parasyte: Part 1	Goto		
2015	Parasyte: Part 2	Goto		
2015	Grasshopper	Kujira		
2015	Journey to the Shore	Yūsuke		
2015	Haha to Kuraseba	Kuroda		
2016	Harmonium	Yasaka		
2016	Silence	Interpreter		
2016	The Wasted Times	Watabe		
2017	Dear Etranger	Makoto Tanaka		
2017	Thor: Ragnarok	Hogun		
2017	Shinjuku Swan II	Masaki Taki		
2018	The Outsider	Kiyoshi		
2018	Kuso-yarō to Utsukushiki Sekai			
2018	Punk Samurai Slash Down	Chayama Hanrō		
2018	Kasane	Kingo Habuta		
2019	Chiwawa	Sakata		
2019	They Say Nothing Stays the Same			
2019	Noroshi ga Yobu		Short film	
2019	Midway	Rear Admiral Tamon Yamaguchi		
2020	Minamata	Tatsuo Matsumura		
2020	Labyrinth of Cinema	Lt. Sako		
2020	Independence of Japan	Jirō Shirasu		
2021	Detective Chinatown 3	Naoki Tanaka	Chinese film	
2021	Mortal Kombat	Lord Raiden		
2021	Kate	Renji		
2023	We're Broke, My Lord!	Isogai Heihachirō		
2023	Kubi	Kuroda Kanbei		
2024	The Box Man	Fake Doctor		
2024	The Women in the Lakes	Isami		
2025	Ravens	Masahisa Fukase		
2025	Kanasando			
2025	Broken Rage	Detective Inoue		
2026	Mortal Kombat II	Lord Raiden		
2026	All the Lovers in the Night	Mitsutsuka		
TBA	Funky Forest: The Second Contact			

=== Television ===
Year	Title	Role	Notes	Ref.
1988	Kinpachi-sensei	Masahiro Azuma		
1993	Fried Dragon Fish	Natsuro	TV movie	
1993	Haru no Ichizoku	Tomoki		
2006	Japanorama	Himself	Documentaries	
2011	Sutekina Kakushi Dori: Kanzen Muketsu no Concierge	Artist	TV movie	
2011	Yonimo kimyô na Monogatari	Killer	TV movie	
2017	A Life: A Love	Masao Danjō		
2019	Idaten	Shōjirō Kawashima	Taiga drama	
2021	Welcome Home, Monet	Shinji Oikawa	Asadora	
2024	Shōgun	Kashigi Yabushige	Miniseries	

=== Video games ===
Year	Title	Role	Developer	Notes	Ref.
2011	Shadows of the Damned	Garcia Hotspur	Grasshopper Manufacture	Debut video game dubbing role	

== Bibliography ==
- Morris, Jerome C. "I'm Not as Whacked Out as Dragon Eye Morrison" (interview), in Asian Cult Cinema, #54.
