= Yoshiaki Kawajiri =

Japanese animator (born 1950)

- 川尻 善昭
- Born: November 18, 1950 (age 75); Yokohama, Kanagawa Prefecture, Japan
- Occupations: Film director, screenwriter, character designer, storyboard artist, animator
- Years active: 1969–present

Yoshiaki Kawajiri (川尻 善昭, Kawajiri Yoshiaki; born November 18, 1950) is a Japanese writer, director, storyboard artist and animator. A co-founder of the anime studio Madhouse, he is best known as the director of Wicked City, Ninja Scroll, and Vampire Hunter D: Bloodlust.

== Biography ==
Kawajiri was born on November 18, 1950, and grew up in Yokohama, Kanagawa Prefecture, Japan. After he graduated from high school in 1968, he worked as an animator at Mushi Production Animation until it closed in 1972. He then joined Madhouse as one of the four co-founders, and in the 1970s was promoted to animation director. He finally debuted as a film director with 1984's Lensman: Secret of The Lens, directing jointly with the more experienced Kazuyuki Hirokawa (Kawajiri also did the character design along with Kazuo Tomizawa). Gaining an interest in darker animation, he next directed The Running Man. Afterwards, he was instructed to make a 35-minute short based on Hideyuki Kikuchi's novels, which was released as Wicked City. After completing it, however, his producers were so impressed that he was asked to make it a feature-length film. Kawajiri enjoyed the dark tone, and agreed to manage and complete the film within a year. That same year he began to work for the Original Video Animation market debuting with "The Phoenix". From 1987 he also wrote his own scripts.

Wicked City received critical and commercial success when released in 1987, giving Kawajiri more creative freedom. He began scripting and designing his own film set in feudal Japan. The result, Ninja Scroll, about the Japanese folk hero Jubei Yagyu, was soon released. After the Western release in 1996, Kawajiri's status as a director received international recognition. He was asked in 2002 to direct a segment, titled Program, of The Animatrix, considered a showcase of the best directors of Japanese animation. Before The Animatrix, he also directed Vampire Hunter D: Bloodlust, which was based on a novel by Hideyuki Kikuchi.

Kawajiri directed Highlander: The Search for Vengeance. It was released on DVD on 5 June 2007. According to an interview with Ain't It Cool News with producer Galen Walker, Kawajiri disliked the fact that 7–8 minutes of added scenes with no opening exposition text sequence were removed when the film was released, but the director's cut will include the footage. Kawajiri has script approval for a sequel to Ninja Scroll, which was listed as being in pre-production. In February 2014, Hiroyuki Okada confirmed that Kawajiri had finished the script in May 2013, and that production would begin when funding is secured.

== Filmography ==
=== Films ===
- Lensman: Secret of The Lens (1984) – director, storyboard, character design, key animation
- Wicked City (1987) – director, screenwriter (as Kisei Choo), character design, animation director
- Neo Tokyo (1987) (Segment: "The Running Man") – segment director, screenwriter, character design, animation director
- Demon City Shinjuku (1988) – director, character design
- A Wind Named Amnesia (1990) – screenwriter, supervision
- Ninja Scroll (1993) – director, screenwriter, original work, original character design
- Vampire Hunter D: Bloodlust (2000) – director, screenwriter, storyboard
- The Animatrix (2003) – segment director (Segment: "Program"), screenwriter (Segments: "World Record" and "Program")
- Azumi 2: Death or Love (2005) – screenwriter
- Highlander: The Search for Vengeance (2007) – director, storyboard, key animation
- Batman: Gotham Knight (2008) (Segment: "Deadshot") – segment co-director (uncredited)

=== OVAs ===
- The Phoenix OVA (1987) (Episode: "Space") – episode director
- Goku: Midnight Eye (1989) – director
- Cyber City Oedo 808 (1990–1991) – director, character design
- The Cockpit (1994) (Segment: "Slipstream") – episode director, screenwriter, character design, animation director
- Biohunter (1995) – screenwriter, supervision, key animation
- Birdy the Mighty (1996–1997) – director, screenwriter, storyboard, key animation

=== TV series ===
- X (2001) – director, script, storyboard
- Ninja Scroll: The Series (2003) – original creator

=== Other work ===
- Dororo (1969) – in-between animation
- Cleopatra (1970) – in-between animation
- Tomorrow's Joe (1970) – in-between animation, key animation
- New Moomin (1972) – key animation
- Science Ninja Team Gatchaman (1972) – key animation
- Dokonjō Gaeru (1972) – key animation
- Aim for the Ace! (1973) – ending Illustration, key animation
- Jungle Kurobe (1973) – key animation
- Samurai Giants (1973) – key animation
- Judo Sanka (1974) – key animation
- Hajime Ningen Gyatoruz (1974) – key animation
- The Fire G-Man (1975) – key animation
- Adventures of Ganba (1975) – key animation
- Demon Dragon of the Heavens Gaiking (1976) – key animation
- Manga Sekai Mukashi Banashi (1976) – episode director, character design, key animation, background art
- Manga Nihon Mukashi Banashi (1976) – episode director, character design (uncredited), key animation, background art
- Jetter Mars (1977) – key animation
- Future Boy Conan (1978) – key animation
- Animation Kikō Marco Polo no Bōken (1979) – storyboard, key animation
- Botchan (1980) – key animation
- The Fantastic Adventures of Unico (1981) – key animation, setting (assistance)
- The Sea Prince and the Fire Child (1981) – key animation
- The Door Into Summer (1981) – layout
- Wandering Cloud (1982) – storyboard, layout, key animation (uncredited)
- Unico in the Island of Magic (1983) – layout, key animation
- Barefoot Gen (1983) – key animation
- Harmagedon (1983) – key animation
- Georgie! (1983) – opening animation
- Stop!! Hibari-kun! (1983) – episode director
- The Dagger of Kamui (1985) – key animation
- Barefoot Gen 2 (1986) – key animation
- Toki no Tabibito -Time Stranger- (1986) – key animation
- Junk Boy (1987) – special CF
- Bride of Deimos (1988) – key animation
- Legend of the Forest (1988) – key animation
- Legend of the Galactic Heroes (1988) – guest character design
- Kimba the White Lion (1989) – character design
- Record of Lodoss War (1990) – key animation
- Zetsuai 1989 (1992) – storyboard
- Phantom Quest Corp. (1994) – opening animation
- Bronze: Cathexis (1994) – storyboard
- Azuki-chan (1995) – character design
- Memories (1995) (Segment: "Stink Bomb") – supervision, key animation
- X (1996) – key animation
- Todd McFarlane's Spawn (1997) – main title director
- Master Keaton (1998) – screenwriter, storyboard
- Pet Shop of Horrors (1999) – storyboard
- Cardcaptor Sakura Movie 2: The Sealed Card (2000) – storyboard, key animation
- Party 7 (2000) – key animation
- Metropolis (2001) – key animation, layout (assistance)
- Ogawa No Medaka (2002) – key animation
- Space Pirate Captain Herlock: The Endless Odyssey (2002) – storyboard
- Gokusen (2004) – storyboard
- Devil May Cry: The Animated Series (2007) – key animation
- Shigurui (2007) – storyboard
- Redline (2009) – 1st key animation
- Iron Man (2010) – storyboard
- Wolverine (2011) – storyboard
- The Tibetan Dog (2011) – key animation
- Kaiji: Against All Rules (2011) – storyboard
- X-Men (2011) – storyboard
- Blade (2011) – storyboard
- Chihayafuru (2011) – storyboard
- Black Jack: Dezaki's Final Chapter (2011) – key animation
- Btooom! (2012) – storyboard
- Chihayafuru 2 (2013) – storyboard
- Iron Man: Rise of Technovore (2013) – storyboard
- Ace of Diamond (2014) – storyboard
- Overlord (2015) – storyboard
- Rokka: Braves of the Six Flowers (2015) – storyboard
- One Punch Man (2015) – storyboard
- Garo: Crimson Moon (2015) – storyboard
- Alderamin on the Sky (2016) – storyboard
- All Out!! (2016) – storyboard
- Pluto: Pilot (2017) – storyboard
- ACCA: 13-Territory Inspection Dept. (2017) – storyboard
- Marvel Future Avengers (2017) – storyboard
- Rage of Bahamut: Virgin Soul (2017) – storyboard
- Overlord II (2018) – storyboard
- Mr. Tonegawa: Middle Management Blues (2018) – storyboard
- Attack on Titan Season 3 Part 1 (2018) – storyboard
- Boogiepop and Others (2019) – storyboard
- Demon Slayer: Kimetsu no Yaiba (2019) – storyboard
- No Guns Life (2019) – storyboard
- Blade of the Immortal (2019) – storyboard
- Chihayafuru 3 (2020) – storyboard
- Deca-Dence (2020) – storyboard
- Jujutsu Kaisen (2020) – storyboard
- Beastars 2nd Season (2021) – storyboard
- Sonny Boy (2021) – storyboard
- Platinum End (2022) – storyboard
- Police in a Pod (2022) – storyboard
- Kin no Kuni Mizu no Kuni (2023) – storyboard
- Vinland Saga Season 2 (2023) – storyboard
- Trigun Stampede (2023) – storyboard
- The Gene of AI (2023) – storyboard
- Frieren: Beyond Journey's End (2023) – storyboard
- Orb: On the Movements of the Earth (2025) – storyboard

== Books ==
- Arctic Luko (北極のルーコ). Chobunsha, 1989. ISBN 978-4811370989
- Vampire Hunter D: Bloodlust Storyboard Collection (川尻善昭「バンパイアハンターD」絵コンテ集). Asahi Sonorama, 2001. ISBN 978-4257036333
