= Kanji Tsuda =

Japanese actor

- 津田 寛治
- Born: 27 August 1965 (age 61); Fukui, Fukui, Japan
- Occupation: Actor
- Years active: 1993–present
- Children: 2

Kanji Tsuda (津田 寛治, Tsuda Kanji; born August 27, 1965) is a Japanese actor.

== Career ==
Tsuda appeared in Kamen Rider Ryuki as Daisuke Okubo and Ju-On: The Grudge as Katsuya Tokunaga.

== Filmography ==
=== Film ===
- Sonatine (1993)
- 119 (1994)
- Kids Return (1996)
- Hana-bi (1997)
- Bayside Shakedown: The Movie (1998)
- April Story (1998), Fukatsu
- Audition (1999), Bartender
- Shark Skin Man and Peach Hip Girl (1999), Fukazume
- Himawari (2000)
- Party 7 (2000), Desk Clerk
- Monday (2000)
- Love Song (2001)
- Go (2001), Henchman of Kato's father
- Distance (2001)
- Desert Moon (2001), Masaru's elder brother
- Drive (2002)
- August Illusion (2002)
- Copycat Killer (2002)
- Kamen Rider Ryuki: Episode Final (2002), Daisuke Okubo
- When the Last Sword Is Drawn (2003)
- Ju-on: The Grudge (2002), Katsuya Tokunaga
- Kamen Rider 555: Paradise Lost (2003), Mina's Father
- Dolls (2002), Young Hiro
- Last Love, First Love (2003)
- Socrates in Love (2004), Johnny
- Kiss and Kizu (2004)
- Love Kill Kill (2004)
- Survive Style 5+ (2004)
- The Sea of Trees (2004)
- Curtain Call (2004)
- Strawberry Field (2004)
- Cromartie High – The Movie (2005), Interviewer A
- Funky Forest (2005)
- The Great Yokai War (2005)
- Kamen Rider: The First (2005), Bat
- Water Flower (2006), Takashi Nagahara
- The Pavilion Salamandre (2006)
- Gamera the Brave (2006), Kousuke Aizawa
- Waiting in the Dark (2006)
- Sakuran (2007)
- Itsuka no Kimi e (2007)
- My Darling of the Mountains (2008)
- Tokyo Sonata (2008), Kurosu
- Vampire Girl vs. Frankenstein Girl (2009)
- Blood (2009), Detective Hoshino
- Kyō Kara Hitman (2009), Round Glasses
- Surely Someday (2010)
- Heaven's Story (2010)
- Mutant Girls Squad (2010), Rin's father
- Garo: Red Requiem (2010), Kengi
- A Good Husband (2010)
- Smuggler (2011)
- Guilty of Romance (2011)
- Life Back Then (2011)
- Dead Sushi (2012)
- The Carol of the Old Ones (2012)
- Flower and Snake: Zero (2014), Toyama
- A Sower of Seeds 3 (2016)
- Shin Godzilla (2016), Fumiya Mori
- Tantei wa, Konya mo Yuuutsuna Yume wo Miru (2017)
- Smokin' on the Moon (2018)
- Recall (2018), Jōji Hamanaka
- Koi no Shizuku (2018)
- The Name (2018), Masao
- 3ft Ball and Souls (2018)
- Genin: Blue Shadow (2019), Katsu Kaishū
- Genin: Red Shadow (2019), Katsu Kaishū
- The Dignified Death of Shizuo Yamanaka (2020), Dr. Imai
- 13gatsu no Onnanoko (2020)
- Hokusai (2021)
- The Supporting Actors: The Movie (2021), Himself
- Nishinari Goro's 400 Million Yen (2021)
- Pretenders (2021)
- Onoda: 10,000 Nights in the Jungle (2021), Middle-Aged Hiroo Onoda
- Death in Tokyo (2021) - Namekata
- Niwatori Phoenix (2022)
- Akira and Akira (2022)
- Roleless (2022)
- Hand (2022)
- Hold Your Hand (2023)
- Side by Side (2023)
- Old Narcissus (2023)
- Kubi (2023), Tamezō
- Oshorin (2023)
- Be My Guest, Be My Baby (2023)
- Six Singing Women (2023)
- This Man (2024)
- Oasis (2024)
- Bibalam (2024)
- Bold as You (2025), Yuichiro Izawa
- How to Forget You (2025), Ushimaru
- Perfect Shared House (2025)
- Rewrite (2025)
- Jinsei (2025), Shiratori (voice)
- After the Quake (2025), Yamaga
- Grandpa! (2025)
- Busshi (2026), Miyata
- The Busiest Actor on Earth (2026), himself
- One Last Love Letter (2026)

=== Television ===
- Mike Yokohama: A Forest with No Name (2002)
- Kamen Rider Ryuki (2002), Daisuke Okubo
- Dr. Coto's Clinic (2003)
- K-tai Investigator 7 (2008)
- Michiko & Hatchin (2008), Hiroshi Morenos (voice)
- Samurai Sentai Shinkenger (2009), Takeru's father
- Mori no Asagao (2010)
- Garo: Yami o Terasu Mono (2013), Tousei Kaneshiro
- Yamishibai: Japanese Ghost Stories (2013)
- Burning Flower (2015), Matsushima Gōzō
- Segodon (2018), Matsudaira Shungaku
- Kamen Rider Zi-O (2019), Daisuke Okubo
- Reach Beyond the Blue Sky (2021) - Takeda Kōunsai
- The Supporting Actors 3 (2021) - Himself
- What Will You Do, Ieyasu? (2023) - Uesugi Kagekatsu
- Wakakozake Season 8 (2025) - Old chef and owner of the Komori-tei izakaya restaurant
- After the Quake (2025) - Yamaga
- The 19th Medical Chart (2025), Tatsuya Narumi
- Did Someone Happen to Mention Me? (2026), himself

=== Dubbing roles ===
==== Animation ====
- Finding Nemo (2003), Gurge
- Finding Dory (2016), Gurge

== Awards ==
- 2002: 45th Blue Ribbon Awards – Supporting Actor (Copycat Killer)
