= The Taste of Tea =

- The Taste of Tea poster
- Original title: 茶の味
- Directed by: Katsuhito Ishii
- Written by: Katsuhito Ishii
- Produced by: Kazuto Takida; Kazutoshi Wadakura
- Starring: Tadanobu Asano; Takahiro Sato; Maya Banno; Satomi Tezuka; Tomokazu Miura; Tatsuya Gashuin; Anna Tsuchiya; Rinko Kikuchi
- Cinematography: Kosuke Matushima
- Edited by: Katsuhito Ishii
- Music by: Little Tempo
- Distributed by: Grasshoppa (Japan); Viz Media (USA)
- Release date: July 17, 2004
- Running time: 143 minutes
- Country: Japan
- Language: Japanese

The Taste of Tea (Japanese: 茶の味, Hepburn: Cha no Aji) is a 2004 Japanese comedy drama fantasy film written and directed by Katsuhito Ishii. Described as a "surreal" version of Ingmar Bergman's Fanny and Alexander (1982), it follows the daily lives of a family living in rural Tochigi prefecture, north of Tokyo. Main influences for the director were the magical realism of Nobuhiko Obayashi, the unexpected humor of Takeshi Kitano, the eccentric surrealism of Seijun Suzuki and the middle-class daily life stories of Yasujiro Ozu. It was a selection of the Cannes Film Festival.

== Synopsis ==
The film follows the lives of the Haruno family, who live in rural Tochigi Prefecture, the countryside north of Tokyo. Nobuo is a hypnotherapist. He teaches Go to his son Hajime. Hajime becomes an excellent Go player, but he has a rough time with girls and puberty. Yoshiko refuses to be an average housewife and works on animated film projects at home. She uses assistance from grandfather Akira, an eccentric old man who is a former animator and occasional model.

Eight-year-old Sachiko periodically sees a silent, giant-size double of herself which mimics or benignly watches her. She contemplates ways to rid herself of it. Uncle Ayano is a sound engineer and record producer who comes to stay for a visit. He engages in inward reflection, seeks closure regarding an old relationship, and recounts a childhood experience—a tale that influences Sachiko and ties into later events.

== Cast ==
=== Haruno family ===
- Tomokazu Miura as Nobuo Haruno - father
- Satomi Tezuka as Yoshiko Haruno - mother
- Maya Banno as Sachiko Haruno - daughter
- Takahiro Sato as Hajime Haruno - son
- Tadanobu Asano as Ayano Haruno - uncle
- Tatsuya Gashuin as Akira Todoroki - grandpa

=== Side characters ===
- Tomoko Nakajima as Akira Terako, former girlfriend of Ayano Haruno
- Anna Tsuchiya as Aoi Suzuishi, new classmate of Hajime and his love interest
- Ikki Todoroki as himself, anime artist recording a song
- Kenichi Matsuyama - Matsuken, the man in the red shirt
- Hideaki Anno as Kasugabe, the anime director Yoshiko works for
- Rinko Kikuchi - Yuriko Kikuchi
- Ryo Kase - Rokutaro Hamadayama
- Kenji Mizuhashi - Maki Hoshino
- Kaiji Moriyama as Morio Moriyama, the dancer at the river

== Reception ==
The film has earned a 100% approval rating on Rotten Tomatoes based on 22 reviews, and a 77/100 weighted average on Metacritic based on five reviews. It was also one of Ed Park's choices in the 2012 Sight & Sound critics' poll of the greatest films ever made.

== Awards ==
- Grand Prix and Audience Award - 2004, Entrevues Film Festival
- Golden Maile Award (Best Feature Film) - 2004, Hawaii International Film Festival
- Best New Actress (Anna Tsuchiya) - 2004, Hochi Film Awards)
- Orient Express Award - 2004, Festival de Cine de Sitges (Special Mention)
- Audience Award - 2005, Dejima Japanese Film Festival
- Best Asian Film - 2005, Fant-Asia Film Festival
- Fantasia Ground-Breaker Award - 2005, Fant-Asia Film Festival (3rd Place)
- Audience Award - 2005, New York Asian Film Festival
- Best New Actress (Anna Tsuchiya) - 2005 Kinema Junpo Awards
- New Talent Award (Anna Tsuchiya) - 2005, Mainichi Film Award
- Festival Prize - 2005, Yokohama Film Festival

== Sources ==
- 茶の味 (in Japanese). Japanese Movie Database.
