= Katsuhito Ishii =

Japanese film director (born 1966)

- 石井 克人
- Born: 31 December 1966 (age 59); Niigata Prefecture, Japan
- Education: Musashino Art University
- Occupations: Film director, Screenwriter
- Years active: 1992–present
- Website: www.nicerainbow.com

Katsuhito Ishii (石井 克人, Ishii Katsuhito; born 31 December 1966) is a Japanese film director best known for directing The Taste of Tea (2004), Funky Forest (2005), and Smuggler (2011).

== Career ==
After graduating from Musashino Art University, Ishii got a job at Tohokushinsha Film and began directing commercials in 1992, receiving numerous awards in this field. His first short film, The Promise of August, shot in 1995, received the Japanese Film Grand Prix in the Fantastic Video Section of the 1995 Yubari International Fantastic Film Festival.

He made his feature debut with Shark Skin Man and Peach Hip Girl, based on the visual novel by cult manga artist Minetaro Mochizuki and starring regular collaborator Tadanobu Asano.

Ishii quickly followed his success with another box office hit, Party 7 (2000), which featured Masatoshi Nagase, Yoshio Harada and Tadanobu Asano among others. Between the years 2001 and 2002, he created a series of short films including the 3D animated dialogue piece Hal & Bons and the 2D animated space opera Trava Fist Planet. Among other commercials and select TV projects including the short Black Room which starred Takuya Kimura, and Music Power Go Go!, He collaborated with Production I.G for the animation sequence of Quentin Tarantino's Kill Bill: Volume 1.

In 2004, his fourth feature film The Taste of Tea won Best Feature Film at the Hawaii International Film Festival. In 2006, he co-directed the feature film Funky Forest with fellow Japanese film makers and old school friends Shunichiro Miki and ANIKI. He founded his own production company, Nice Rainbow, in October 2006.

== Filmography ==
Year	English title	Original title	Role	Notes
1995	Promise of August'	8月の約束; Hachigatsu no yakusoku	Writer and director	
1998	Shark Skin Man and Peach Hip Girl	鮫肌男と桃尻女; Samehada otoko to momojiri onna	Writer and director	
2000	Party 7	PARTY7	Writer and director	
2001	Trava: Fist Planet episode 1		Co-directed with Takeshi Koike	Original Video Animation
2004	The Taste of Tea	茶の味; Cha no aji	Writer and director	
2005	Funky Forest: The First Contact	ナイスの森 The First Contact; Naisu no mori: The First Contact	Co-written and co-directed with Hajime Ishimine and Shunichiro Miki	
2007	Hokuro Brothers Full Throttle!!!!	ホクロ兄弟 フルスロットル!!!! Hokuro Kyodai Full Throttle!!!!	Director	
2008	My Darling of the Mountains	山のあなた 徳市の恋; Yama no anata - Tokuichi no koi	Director	
2008	Sorasoi	そらそい	Co-written with Yûka Ôsumi; co-directed with Shunichirô Miki	
2009	Redline	REDLINE	Screenplay and original story	
2011	Smuggler	スマグラー おまえの未来を運べ; Smuggler: Carry Your Own Future	Director and screenplay	Based on manga by Shohei Manabe
2014	Hello! Jun'ichi	ハロー！純一; Harô! Jun'ichi	Co-directed with Kanoko Kawaguchi and Atsushi Yoshioka	Based on novel by Noriko Ishii
2015	Gamera: 50th Anniversary	—N/a	Writer and director	Short film
2022	Norioka Workshop	ノリオカワークショップ	Writer and director	Short film
TBA	Funky Forest: The Second Contact	ナイスの森 The Second Contact; Naisu no mori: The Second Contact	Co-written and co-directed with Hajime Ishimine and Shunichiro Miki	In production
