= Love Kill Kill =

- Directed by: Shinya Nishimura
- Written by: Shinya Nishimura
- Cinematography: Kazuhiro Suzuki
- Release date: August 28, 2004
- Running time: 91 minutes
- Country: Japan
- Language: Japanese

Love Kill Kill (ラブキルキル, Rabu kiru kiru) is a 2004 Japanese pink film (softcore pornographic theatrical film) directed by Shinya Nishimura. It was the second film in Eurospace's "Eros Bancho" series.

== Plot ==
Satoshi Minagawa (Kanji Tsuda), an office worker, seems normal but is in fact a violent porn movie fan. Nao Aiba (Rubi Aiba), a high school student, roams around town instead of going to school. Sayuri Maejima (Shion Machida) is unemployed and her brother Kou grows magic mushrooms for sale. Satoshi has a crush on Sayuri but his preparations to introduce himself are a little odd (Employs Nao to stalk Sayuri).
