= A Wind Named Amnesia =

Novel by Hideyuki Kikuchi

- Theatrical pamphlet for the film

風の名はアムネジア (Kaze no Na wa Amunejia)
- Genre: Action, Adventure, Post-apocalyptic
- Novel
- Written by: Hideyuki Kikuchi
- Illustrated by: Yoshitaka Amano
- Published by: Asahi Sonorama
- English publisher: NA: Dark Horse Comics
- Published: October 31, 1983
- Anime film
- Directed by: Kazuo Yamazaki; Supervising Directors: Yoshiaki Kawajiri; Rintaro
- Written by: Kazuo Yamazaki; Yoshiaki Kawajiri; Kenji Kurata
- Music by: Kazuhiko Toyama; Hidenobu Takimoto
- Studio: Madhouse
- Licensed by: AUS / UK: Manga Entertainment; NA: Discotek Media
- Released: December 22, 1990
- Runtime: 80 minutes
- icon

A Wind Named Amnesia, (Note: Japanese: 風の名はアムネジア, Hepburn: Kaze no Na wa Amunejia) also known as The Wind of Amnesia in Australia and the United Kingdom, is a Japanese novel authored by Hideyuki Kikuchi, originally published in 1983 by Asahi Sonorama. An anime film adaptation by Madhouse was released theatrically on December 22, 1990, directed by Kazuo Yamazaki. An English adaptation of the film was produced and released by Manga Entertainment on home video in Australia and the UK and by Central Park Media in North America.

== Plot ==
In 1999, the world has been reduced to an apocalyptic wasteland due to an inexplicable gust of wind that wiped even the most basic memories, such as speech and civility, from the minds of the world's populace. Wataru befriends a young man named Johnny who, prior to the incident, was part of a government experiment designed to expand the memory capacity of the human mind and, therefore, was able to retain his memories. Johnny helps Wataru regain his speech and teaches him other basic functions. However, as a result of the physical toll his body endured due to the government experiments, Johnny dies after encouraging Wataru to travel the world.

Wataru encounters a strange woman named Sophia after she helps him escape from an encounter with an unmanned Police Mech Unit and agrees to take Sophia to New York City. Together the two travel to Los Angeles where they help save Sue and her father, Little John, from a mob. Sue was to be offered as a bride to appease a "god", which in reality is a Construction Mech controlled by a man, but fled to escape her fate. However, upon realizing that if she were not sacrificed another woman would be in her stead, she flees from the group to rejoin her tribe. Wataru destroys the Construction Mech but Sue is killed in the conflict. Little John remains in Los Angeles to keep order of the tribe and rebuild society.

Wataru and Sophia resume their travels only to be attacked once more by the Police Mech. Sophia rescues Wataru and brings him to an advanced city called Eternal Town for medical attention. When Wataru regains consciousness, he discovers that the city is run by a super computer that has brainwashed two of its original citizens into running the day-to-day operations of the city. The super computer attempts to persuade Sophia and Wataru into becoming citizens as well but the two escape with one of the original citizens, Lisa. As they depart from the city, Lisa begins to recall memories from her past including the fact that the other citizen who was brainwashed into running the city was her father. As a result, Lisa decides to remain in Eternal Town. Sophia then explains that she is a member of an alien race that is responsible for the wind that erased Earth's citizens' memories. Sophia makes a wager with Wataru that if he is able to convince another person to join him in his travels, she will return humanity's memory.

Wataru and Sophia are chased across the country by the unrelenting Police Mech until they reach New York City. Upon arriving, Wataru drops Sophia off in order to defeat the Police Mech by himself. After destroying the Police Mech, Sophia saves Wataru as he falls from a building. Sophia leaves in order to rejoin her race and convince them that humanity deserves to have their memories.

== Novel ==
Japanese Version

- Title: 風の名はアムネジア (Kaze no Na-wa Amunejia)
- Writer: Hideyuki Kikuchi
- Artist: Yoshitaka Amano
- Cover Artist: Yoshitaka Amano
- Publication Date: October 31, 1983
- ISBN 9784257762607

English Version

- Title: A Wind Named Amnesia/Invader Summer
- Cover Artist: Yoshitaka Amano
- Publication Date: December 23, 2009
- ISBN 1-59307-934-6

== Film ==
=== Voice cast ===
Cast
Character	Japanese	English
Wataru	Kazuki Yao	Adam Henderson
Sophia	Keiko Toda	Denica Fairman
Johnny	Kappei Yamaguchi	Ben Fairman (as Lee Tyler)
Lisa	Noriko Hidaka	Barbara Barnes (as Susie Baker)
Mr. Simpson	Osamu Saka	Peter Marinker
Guardian	Masaharu Satou	Unknown
Little John	Daisuke Gouri	Bob Sessions
Sue	Yuko Mita	Annemarie Lawless
Priest	Hirohiko Kakegawa	Unknown

=== Staff ===
- Original Novel/Story: Hideyuki Kikuchi
- Licensors: Central Park Media, Manga Entertainment Ltd. (Australia and UK)
- Producer: Tadao Masumizu, Tomirou Kuriyama, Shin Seya
- Executive producer: Kosuke Kuri
- Director: Kazuo Yamazaki
- Setting: Masao Maruyama
- Script: Kazuo Yamazaki, Yoshiaki Kawajiri & Kenji Kurata
- Supervisors: Rintaro & Yoshiaki Kawajiri
- Character Design: Satoru Makamura
- Art Director: Koseki Mutsuo
- Mechanical Design: Morifumi Naka
- Design of "Guardian": Yoshitaka Amano
- Production: Madhouse
- Original Music: Hidenobu Takimoto & Kazuhiko Toyama

== Reception ==
The film has garnered some praise years after its initial release. Raphael See of THEM Anime Reviews called the film a sleeper hit and "one of the best titles I've never heard of." Anime News Network in their review considered the film a classic, although noting the ending was weak. Bamboo Dong in her review wrote "Without a doubt, A Wind Named Amnesia is one of the most unique and creative post-apocalyptic tales ever woven. " Critics have praised the production values of the film, and generally considered it thought-provoking and cerebral. The original novel the film is based on has also recently received some praise. Fred Patten regards the novel as being derivative of Rebirth by Thomas Calvert McClary.
