= Michiko & Hatchin =

Japanese anime television series

- Key visual of the series

ミチコとハッチン (Michiko to Hatchin)
- Genre: Adventure; Girls with guns
- Created by: Manglobe
- Anime television series
- Directed by: Sayo Yamamoto
- Produced by: Shinichirō Kobayashi; Takashi Kouchiyama; Shinsaku Tanaka; Kōji Yamamoto; Yoshinori Takeeda
- Written by: Takashi Ujita
- Music by: Alexandre Kassin
- Studio: Manglobe
- Licensed by: Crunchyroll (Note: In North America by Crunchyroll LLC (formerly known as Funimation) and in Australia through Crunchyroll Store Australia (formerly known as Madman Anime).); UK: MVM Entertainment
- Original network: Fuji TV (Noise)
- English network: US: Funimation Channel, Adult Swim (Toonami)
- Original run: 16 October 2008 – 19 March 2009
- Episodes: 22
- icon

Michiko & Hatchin (Japanese: ミチコとハッチン, Hepburn: Michiko to Hatchin) is a Japanese anime television series conceptualized by Manglobe and produced by Media Factory, Fuji TV, Shochiku, Yomiko Advertising and Hakuhodo DY Media Partners. It is directed by Sayo Yamamoto, with Takashi Ujita writing the scripts, Hiroshi Shimizu designing the characters and Seiki Tamura serving as art director. The music was composed by the Brazilian musician Alexandre Kassin and produced by Shinichirō Watanabe. The two eponymous starring roles are portrayed by film actresses Yōko Maki (The Grudge) and Suzuka Ohgo (Memoirs of a Geisha). It was broadcast for 22 episodes on Fuji TV's Noise programming block from October 2008 to March 2009.

The story takes place in the fictional country of Diamandra, which has cultural traces from South American countries, mostly from Brazil. In the first episode, Michiko is introduced as a free-willed "sexy diva" who escapes from a supposedly inescapable prison fortress, while Hatchin is a girl fleeing her abusive foster family. The two join forces on an improbable escape to freedom.

== Plot ==
In the fictional South American country of Diamandra, the criminal Michiko Malandro escapes from prison and kidnaps her former lover's daughter Hana Morenos, whom she nicknames "Hatchin", saving her both from her abusive foster parents and equally cruel foster siblings in the process. The two are about as opposite as they come, but their fates become intertwined through the connection of Hiroshi Morenos, Hatchin's biological father. On the run from the police and Hatchin's abusive foster family, the unlikely duo set out to find Hiroshi and ultimately discover their freedom.

== Characters ==
Michiko Malandro (ミチコ・マランドロ, Michiko Marandoro)
Voiced by: Yōko Maki, Rina Hidaka (young) (Japanese); Monica Rial (English)
An independent woman who has just recently escaped one of the most heavily guarded prisons in existence for at least the fourth time. Michiko rescues Hatchin from her abusive foster family and claims to know her father, who, according to her, was a good man and "made her fall in love with him right away". Both she and Hatchin embark on a journey to find him while running from the law as well. They become a bickering pair, but soon come to realize how much they truly need each other.
Hannah "Hatchin" Morenos (ハナ・モレーノス, Hana Morēnosu)
Voiced by: Suzuka Ohgo (Japanese); Jad Saxton (English)
A young girl who previously lived with a foster family who later earns the nickname "Hatchin" (ハッチン) (or "Hachi" (ハチ)) from Michiko. She was the victim of abuse by both parents and their two biological children, until Michiko came to her rescue. She is hesitant to trust the woman, but they share the same tattoo on their stomachs. Unlike Michiko, Hatchin is much more levelheaded and serious, often functioning as the voice of reason of the two. Despite Michiko often putting her in danger due to her destructive habits and her sometimes irrational plans, Hatchin grows to care deeply for her.
Hiroshi Morenos (ヒロシ・モレーノス, Hiroshi Morēnosu)
Voiced by: Kanji Tsuda, Kaito Arai (young) (Japanese); Christopher Bevins, Jad Saxton (young) (English)
Hatchin's father and Michiko's love from the past. Despite being officially considered dead, Michiko believes that he is alive and rescues Hatchin in order to find clues about his whereabouts. He shares the same tattoo as both Michiko and Hatchin, except on his left shoulder.
Atsuko Jacson (アツコ・ジャキソン, Atsuko Jakison)
Voiced by: Maki Sakai, Suzuno Nomura (young) (Japanese); Sametria Ewunes (English)
She lived in the same orphanage as Michiko and seems to have a score to settle with her. She is now a police officer and was responsible for Michiko's arrest twelve years before the main plot. Michiko likes to call her "Jambo" (a Portuguese word for both some syzygium fruit and to refer to a dark or brown-skinned person), in order to get her angry. She seems to have mixed feelings for Michiko and is sometimes seen helping her out of a bad situation.
Satoshi Batista (サトシ・バティスタ, Satoshi Batisuta)
Voiced by: Masaki Miura, Masahiro Jingu (young) (Japanese); Akron Watson, Anastasia Muñoz (young) (English)
An old lifelong friend of Hiroshi's who assumed control of the crime syndicate "Monstro Preto" ("Black Monster") while Michiko was behind bars. He and Hiroshi have been friends since they were children, and Hiroshi once saved his life from the original leaders of Monstro once it was discovered that Satoshi plotted to take control of the gang. Throughout the series, he is shown to be harsh, brutal and vicious, rarely showing mercy to those that have interfered with his plans. He hates Michiko, feeling that she is part of the reason that Hiroshi left and "betrayed" his friendship; much like her, he too is determined to track down Hiroshi.
Schinske Saci Rodriguez (シンスケ・サッセ・ロドリゲス, Shinsuke Sasse Rodorigesu)
Voiced by: Jun Murakami (Japanese); Scott Freeman (English)
One of Satoshi's henchmen with a vicious and sadistic temper. Prior to the events of the series, he and Satoshi were close friends. He attempts to take control of Monstro by having Satoshi killed, but his betrayal is discovered leading to conflict between the two for the remainder of the series.
Pepê Lima (ペペ・リマ, Pepe Rima)
Voiced by: Shie Kohinata (Japanese); Caitlin Glass (English)
A famous exotic dancer at a local strip club. During her childhood she grew up in a fabulously wealthy family, pampered and raised like a princess until her father died and her family went bankrupt. She and her little sister, Lulu, live with Pepê's boyfriend Rico, who she is in an abusive relationship with.
Lulu Lima (ルル・リマ, Ruru Rima)
Voiced by: Megumi Yamaguchi (Japanese); Brittney Karbowski (English)
Pepê's younger sister who wears matching outfits like Pepê. She was raised by her older sister in absolute poverty after they lost their father and left their family in debt.
Rico (リコ)
Voiced by: Tetsushi Tanaka (Japanese); Justin Cook (English)
Pepê's pimp and boyfriend who is controlling her dancing career as a night club performer.
Maria Belenbauza Yamada (マリア・ベレンバウザー・山田, Maria Berenbauzā Yamada)
Voiced by: Megumi Ikeda (Japanese); Leah Clark (English)
Hatchin's adoptive older sister who enjoys abusing Hatchin.
Gabriel Belenbauza Yamada (ガブリエル・ベレンバウザー・山田, Gaburieru Berenbauzā Yamada)
Voiced by: Shōma Yashiro (Japanese); Alison Viktorin (English)
Hatchin's adoptive younger brother who enjoys abusing Hatchin.
Joanna Belenbauza Yamada (ジョアンナ・ベレンバウザー・山田, Joanna Berenbauzā Yamada)
Voiced by: Eri Fuse (Japanese); Cynthia Cranz (English)
Hatchin's manipulative adoptive mother. Often talks with a very formal and elegant attitude.
Pedro Belenbauza Yamada (ペドロ・ベレンバウザー・山田, Pedoro Berenbauzā Yamada)
Voiced by: Takeshi Wakamatsu (Japanese); Philip Weber (English)
Hatchin's adoptive father and a Catholic extremist who works as a priest at a local church. He and Joanna use Hatchin for the foster care money the state pays and treat her like a slave. In episode 2, he attempts to end Hatchin's life to gain insurance money while in a high speed chase alongside police.
Rita Ozetti (リタ・オゼッチ, Rita Ozecchi)
Voiced by: Sayaka Yoshino (Japanese); Brina Palencia (English)
A young girl around Hatchin's age who performs as an acrobatic in a traveling circus along with some other children who work for the circus; she was abandoned by her parents as a baby near the circus. When she first met Hatchin, she mistook her for a boy and attempted to kiss her; she has romantic feelings for her adult circus partner Gino Costa.
Gino Costa (ジーノ・コスタ, Jīno Kosuta)
Voiced by: Masami Iwasaki (Japanese); J. Michael Tatum (English)
Rita's circus partner/love interest and a motorcyclist. Even though he tells Hatchin that he is not in love with Rita, with the simple fact that he has a long-term girlfriend who is pregnant with his child, he does care about Rita deeply while reassuring her that someday Rita will meet a lot of nice men and find the right boyfriend to claim as her own.
Maçã (マッサン, Massan)
Voiced by: Yūto Uemura (Japanese); Austin Tindle (English)
A nerdy-looking boy and a close friend of Rita. He is known to be a know-it-all and often get jealous when Rita starts having crushes on older men.
Nuno (ヌーノ, Nūno)
Voiced by: Yō Kitazawa (Japanese); Chris Cason (English)
The ringmaster of Circo De Chocolate (meaning "Chocolate Circus" in Portuguese), a local circus in Perna. He is short in stature for his age (even shorter than Rita) and is mostly seen wearing clown makeup and clothes. He tends to be very short-tempered and strict when it comes to the children working at the circus (including Hatchin and Rita) and also implements hard labor onto them; Nuno is shown to be self-conscious about his height, as he had forced Gino (who is much taller than him) to sit down when getting scolded as he does not want Gino to look down on him. He and Madame Michiko are later revealed to be child traffickers who planned on selling Hatchin, Rita and the rest of the orphans as slaves for child labor—under the ruse that they were going to take the children to an amusement park—until Michiko catches up to them to rescue Hatchin and saving the children from an abusive fate, which eventually leads to their arrest and imprisonment.
Madame Michiko (マダム・ミチコ, Madamu Michiko)
Voiced by: Kujira (Japanese); Josh Grelle (English)
An overweight woman and Nuno's assistant who takes care of the orphaned children who live at the circus. She and Nuno are later revealed to be child traffickers who tricked Hatchin, Rita, and the other children into thinking that they were going to an amusement park when in reality they plan on selling off the children into harsher slavery.

== Release ==
The series was produced by Manglobe and directed by Sayo Yamamoto, her first directorial work. The character designs were provided by Hiroshi Shimizu, with Shigeto Koyama designing Michiko's bike and Mariko Yamagami and Shōgo Yamazaki in charge of character fashion design. It was broadcast for 22 episodes on Fuji TV's (Noise) programming block from 16 October 2008 to 19 March 2009. (Note: Fuji TV listed the air dates for the series on Wednesday at 26:08, which is effectively Thursday at 2:08 a.m. JST.) The opening theme is "Paraíso" ("Paradise") by Soil & "Pimp" Sessions, while the ending theme in the first 21 episodes is "Best Friend" (ベストフレンド, Besuto Furendo) by Karutetto; the ending theme for the final episode is "Nada Pode Me Parar Agora" ("Nothing Can Stop Me Now"), performed by Áurea Martins.

Vitello Productions and GONG produced an English dub pilot of the anime under the title Finding Paradiso, which was later used as the title for the French dub. The anime was later licensed by Funimation in North America, which produced its own English dub. The series aired on Funimation Channel in North America in November 2013, and on Adult Swim's Toonami programming block from June to December 2015. Following Sony's acquisition of Crunchyroll, the series was moved to Crunchyroll.

=== Episodes ===
No.	Title	Directed by	Original release date	English air date
1	"Farewell, Cruel Paradise!" (Adeus, Paraíso Insensivo!); Transliteration: "Saraba da! Hijō no Paradaisu" (Japanese: さらばだ! 非情のパラダイス)	Sayo Yamamoto; Kotomi Ideai	16 October 2008	21 June 2015
Michiko Malandro successfully breaks out of a high-security pound. She later manages to rob a bank, which is reported on the news. Elsewhere, Hannah "Hatchin" Morenos lives the life of Cinderella among her adoptive family. She is brutally mistreated by her foster siblings Maria Belenbauza Yamada and Gabriel Belenbauza Yamada, while her foster parents Joanna Belenbauza Yamada and Pedro Belenbauza Yamada show her no affection. As it seems to be no hope left for Hatchin, her life finally changes paths when Michiko suddenly crashes into the house riding on a scooter onto the dining table and takes Hatchin away from her adoptive family.
2	"The Brown Sugar Outlaw" (O Açúcar Mascavo Fora da Lei); Transliteration: "Okite Yaburi no Buraun Shugā" (Japanese: 掟破りのブラウンシュガー)	Kei Tsunematsu	30 October 2008	28 June 2015
Twelve years ago, Michiko was arrested by police sergeant Atsuko Jacson, Michiko's childhood friend, leaving her feeling betrayed. In the present, with the scooter out of fuel, Michiko and Hatchin discuss about Hiroshi Morenos, who is Michiko's long-lost love and Hatchin's biological father. As the two head to a nearby village to fill up, Michiko has a tough time opening up to Hatchin. After some investigation, Atsuko catches up to the two of them to settle the score. However, Michiko manages to outwit Atsuko and evade the police, while also saving Hatchin from being shot by Pedro. As Michiko and Hatchin continue their journey, Michiko is annoyed when Hatchin questions her about her childhood with Atsuko.
3	"Like a Frantic Pinball" (Como um Fliperama Desesperado); Transliteration: "Shakariki Pinbōru" (Japanese: しゃかりきピンボール)	Kōtarō Tamura	6 November 2008	12 July 2015 (Note: On the broadcast night of 4–5 July 2015, Adult Swim hosted a DBZ-a-thon where they played six episodes of Dragon Ball Z and an episode of Attack on Titan.)
In coastal São Cabral, Michiko and Hatchin consult a crazy fortune-teller in their search for Hiroshi, in which Michiko falls for the fortune-teller while Hatchin disbelieves such a thing. When Hatchin loses her shoes after cleaning and hanging them outside, Michiko steals an expensive pair of shoes to replace them. As a result, Hatchin takes on a job at a restaurant to work for a strict owner named Lam Yin. Meanwhile, Michiko uses a facial sketch of Hiroshi to ask the locals about his whereabouts, but to no avail. In the bathroom, Hatchin cuts off her pigtails with a pair of scissors. When two street boys run away from the restaurant with Hatchin's old pair of shoes, Hatchin chases them, but then starts recalling the fortune foretold. As Hatchin ends up surrounded by more street boys, Michiko arrives and scares them off. Although the sketch does not ultimately lead them to the right man, Hatchin believes what the fortune-teller has said.
4	"Stray Cat Milky Way" (A Via Láctea da Gata de Rua); Transliteration: "Noraneko no Mirukī Wei" (Japanese: のら猫のミルキーウェイ)	Tomohiko Itō	13 November 2008	19 July 2015
Michiko is summoned at gunpoint to see Rico, the local favela boss, who seeks payback for what she did to the street boys, but he fails in the end. Pepê Lima, a stripper at a nearby strip club run by Rico, goes to the restaurant with her younger sister Lulu Lima. Approaching Hatchin with information about Hiroshi, Pepê invites her to a birthday party at the nightclub. At the birthday party, Pepê explains to Michiko that she needs the money from her job in order to live a better life, but only mentions that Hiroshi is a patron. Later on, Michiko is frustrated when Lulu steals her bag. Pepê and Lulu are upset to know that Michiko does not carry IDs in the bag and they abandon Rico. As Lulu goes back to retrieve her photo left behind, Pepê goes to Michiko and begs for help. Although Michiko declines, she gives Pepê some money for the road. However, Pepê is soon shot by a group of street boys.
5	"The Saudade of Fools, Part 1" (A Saudade dos Tolos, Parte 1); Transliteration: "Oroka Monotachi no Saudāji Parte 1" (Japanese: 愚か者たちのサウダージ PARTE1)	Kotomi Ideai	20 November 2008	26 July 2015
Twelve years ago, Michiko confronted Kiril Čapek, a bar owner and leader of the crime syndicate Fantasma, demanding he release the members of the crime syndicate Monstro Preto, but Kiril pulled a gun at her and told her to leave the bar. In the present, Michiko visits her old friend Ivan Hime to find someone named Satoshi Batista, who might know the whereabouts of Hiroshi. Ivan explains there are rumors that Kiril was killed by Michiko during a fight between the two crime syndicates, despite the fact that she was behind bars at the time. Thinking the task ahead to be dangerous, Michiko leaves Hatchin with Zélia Bastos at the orphanage for her safety, even though Hatchin protests and wants to accompany Michiko. However, Zélia does not allow Hatchin to stay since she does not have any money. Later at night, Hatchin is ambushed and captured by members of Fantasma, who are looking for Michiko.
6	"The Saudade of Fools, Part 2" (A Saudade dos Tolos, Parte 2); Transliteration: "Oroka Monotachi no Saudāji Parte 2" (Japanese: 愚か者たちのサウダージ PARTE2)	Yoshihiro Oka	20 November 2008	2 August 2015
Michiko confronts Zélia after hearing that Hatchin was abducted by members of Fantasma. Ivan later informs Michiko that Hatchin is likely being held by Vasily Nabokov, the current leader of Fantasma, at a bullfighting arena in order to draw Michiko closer to him. Meanwhile, Vasily receives a phone call from Satoshi, who demands his cut of the money from the bullfights, but Vasily says that a bullfighter named Marco happens to win each match against the bulls. Michiko sneaks into the arena with help from Ivan, and she disguises herself as Marco to enter into a bullfighting match. As Michiko then charges at Vasily with a sword, Hatchin enters the arena with a ladle while searching for her. Catching sight of Hatchin, Michiko kicks Vasily into the arena and saves Hatchin from being attacked by the bull. Michiko and Hatchin then set off to find Satoshi.
7	"The Rain that Falls in Monotone" (A Chuva que Cai Monótona); Transliteration: "Ame ni Ochiru Monotōn" (Japanese: 雨におちるモノトーン)	Nobuyoshi Habara	4 December 2008	9 August 2015
Michiko and Hatchin stay at a rural river settlement while the scooter is being repaired. While there, Michiko falls for a man named Bruno while sharing some tobacco with him. As Hatchin travels to the store by boat to buy shampoo, she is attacked by three river boys, who steal her shoes and money. Meanwhile, Michiko meets a hairstylist at a salon named Anastácia, who mentions that Bruno is her husband. Michiko is tied up with mixed emotions, disregarding Hatchin's complaints. On two occasions, when preparing to head out to the store again and when getting her hair done at the salon, Hatchin witnesses Bruno privately having an affair with Michiko from a distance. Because of this, Hatchin later storms out on Michiko. While Michiko is surprised to know that Anastácia was already aware of the supposed affair, Hatchin passes out after attempting to retrieve her shoes and money from the bottom of the river as a dare with one of the river boys, but she later wakes up with her prized possessions.
8	"Black Noise and a Dope Game" (Ruídos Negros e um Jogo Fatal); Transliteration: "Kuroi Noizu to Dōpu na Gēmu" (Japanese: 黒いノイズとドープなゲーム)	Shin Itagaki	11 December 2008	16 August 2015
Atsuko continues to pursue Michiko and Hatchin, traveling to all the places they have already visited. As Michiko and Hatchin arrive in Osso, Hatchin bickers about how Michiko threatened the mechanic without paying anything. Later at night, Schinske Saci Rodriguez, a lieutenant in Monstro Preto, checks in on his informant Pogo to locate Satoshi. Meanwhile, Hatchin stumbles upon Satoshi staying at a casino hotel, informing Michiko about this. The next day, Michiko finds a man named Davi Nativa, mistaking him as Satoshi and hoping to get some information by force. As soon as she realizes the mishap, Schinske has the hotel surrounded with guns pointed at them as a threat. Schinske has Michiko and Davi take a series of train routes, while evading the guns being shot at them, to see him at an abandoned train station at six o'clock in the evening. Meanwhile, after receiving a message that Michiko left the hotel, Hatchin travels alone on a separate train route.
9	"The Chocolate Girl in Love" (A Garota-Chocolate Apaixonada); Transliteration: "Koishita Shokoratchi Gāru" (Japanese: 恋したショコラッチガール)	Kei Tsunematsu	11 December 2008	23 August 2015
Hatchin travels to the town of Perna, but she is currently low on money. She quickly meets a young girl named Rita Ozetti, a traveling circus performer. After passing by a restaurant, Rita takes Hatchin to an observation deck and explains that the Maria Statue is a weeping statue that sheds tears of blood, which possibly can grant wishes. At night, Rita talks about her circus partner Gino Costa, who she has strong feelings for. The following day, a boy named Maçã informs Hatchin that Gino is dating a waitress named Natália, much to Hatchin's annoyance. Hatchin runs off to the circus and notifies Rita of this, but Rita is maddened by this and tells Hatchin to leave. Hatchin later learns from Gino that he plans to stay in town after performing with Rita in the upcoming circus show. As Hatchin and Rita visit the site of the Maria Statue, Rita is upset to know that the statue has been replaced after the old one was destroyed. After the circus show turns out to be a success, Hatchin decides to join the circus with Rita instead of going their separate ways.
10	"The Carnival of Hyenas" (As Hienas Carnívoras); Transliteration: "Haiena Domo no Kānibaru" (Japanese: ハイエナどものカーニバル)	Kei Tsunematsu	18 December 2008	30 August 2015
Tracking down a former captain in Monstro Preto named Seiji Manavé, Satoshi takes Seiji, his wife Renée and his son Romeu hostage at his home. Satoshi orders Schinske to send the battered Michiko by train and has Seiji retrieve her from the train station. Since Satoshi was humiliated after failing to kill Seiji in the past, Satoshi finally gets his revenge on Seiji, killing him and his family anyway. Michiko disbelieves Satoshi when he says that Hiroshi was killed in a bus accident twelve years ago. Satoshi explains that he was behind the whole ordeal, including Kiril's disappearance after being framed, Hiroshi's resignation from Monstro Preto and Michiko's arrest after confronting Kiril. The next day, Atsuko meets with Satoshi to give him a bounty for capturing Michiko. However, Atsuko's partner Ricardo Solo, who requested for backup to take down both Michiko and Satoshi, takes matters into his own hands. Although Atsuko finds Michiko in a nearby cornfield, the former lets the latter go. Atsuko then points her crossbow at Ricardo when he approaches her.
11	"Starting Line Downpour" (Tempestade no Ponto de Partida); Transliteration: "Dosha Ori no Sutāto Rain" (Japanese: どしゃ降りスタートライン)	Yoshimitsu Ōhashi	8 January 2009	13 September 2015 (Note: On the broadcast night of 5–6 September 2015, Adult Swim hosted a Michiko & Hatchin Labor Day Marathon where they played episodes 4–10.)
Michiko hurries to the circus, while Hatchin struggles to adjust living in the circus. A news reporter named Daniela Carneiro, Jr. wants to get the inside scoop about possible rumors involving the trafficking of children taking place in the circus. Daniela attempts to bust former circus performer Madame Michiko for this possible crime, but Madame's partner Nuno tranquilizes Daniela and throws him out at sea. However, Hatchin is oblivious to the rumors and believes that the children are being taken to an amusement park. At night, when Michiko finally arrives, Hatchin rebukes her and claims to be living a better life now. Before Madame and Nuno prepare to transport the children by hot air balloon, Daniela tries to release them, but ends up tranquilized again by Nuno. Hatchin saves the children after figuring out what is really going on. As Michiko and Hatchin work together to defeat Madame and Nuno, the former two fall into the sea to safety before lightning strikes down on the hot air balloon. The next day, Michiko and Hatchin say goodbye to Rita before leaving.
12	"Purgatory: 108°C Telepathy" (Telepatia a 108°C no Purgatório); Transliteration: "Jigoku Hyaku-hachi-do no Terepashī" (Japanese: 煉獄108°Cのテレパシー)	Tomohiko Itō	15 January 2009	20 September 2015
While traveling, Michiko takes ill, prompting Hatchin to check into a hotel. Hatchin brings Michiko to a clinic, where they meet a strange physician named Deus, who uses a ritual to pull a fish out of Michiko's stomach as her treatment. To pay for this, Hatchin works for a farmer named Mauro to chase off bandits raiding his crops, but Hatchin is useless at the job and only receives some recovered crops. As a result, Deus doubles the interest of the payment amount due daily until it is made. Hatchin catches Michiko smoking cigarettes and drinking alcohol, hence why she is not getting any better. After Michiko takes out her frustration on the television set from seeing a soap opera about a man and a lady doctor named Feliciano and Cinara, she begins to hallucinate and witnesses Hiroshi having a relationship with a researcher named Elis Michaela. Hatchin later learns from the inn auntie that Deus uses his rituals as a con to pay his gambling debts. At the clinic, Hatchin finds Michiko beating up on Deus for supposedly putting a curse on her, and Hatchin carries Michiko back to the hotel after she passes out.
13	"Goldfish of the Marsh" (Peixe Dourado do Brejo); Transliteration: "Doronuma no Gōrudofisshu" (Japanese: 泥沼のゴールドフィッシュ)	Kotomi Ideai	22 January 2009	27 September 2015
After being demoted, Atsuko is reassigned to Ilha Azul, a small town on the edge of the jungle, under the surveillance of her senior officer Amado. Atsuko meets a rebellious girl named Vanessa Lee, who was caught stealing potatoes nearby. After Atsuko buys Vanessa a sandwich out of sympathy, Vanessa returns the favor by giving Atsuko a coconut while on duty. Vanessa later takes Atsuko to the beach, where the former shares her plan of finding a golden pot hidden inside the chamber of the ruins of Temanaga, which will acquire enough fortune to move out of town and get on with life. Atsuko encounters Ricardo, who is seeking a promotion by volunteering to keep a close eye on her. At night, Atsuko and Vanessa travel inside the chamber, but Atsuko prevents Vanessa from going any further due to toxic gas buildup. Luckily, they both make it out alive the next morning despite their failure in retrieving the golden pot. When Atsuko finds a photograph of Hiroshi and Elis in the newspaper, she decides to help Ricardo receive his promotion by heading to a tomato production plant.
14	"The Daredevil Explosive Runner" (Ousadia do Corredor Explosivo); Transliteration: "Meichirazu no Bōhatsu Rannā" (Japanese: 命知らずの暴発ランナー)	Shūkō Murase	29 January 2009	4 October 2015
Satoshi hires two assassins to kill Michiko, Atsuko and Schinske. The first assassin named Jair, who was assigned to target Schinske, first spots Michiko and Hatchin during a police chase. Michiko and Hatchin stop by an inn after the scooter breaks down again. After following Michiko to the inn, Jair challenges her to a gunfight taking place soon. The next day, as Michiko drives a truck to pick up a replacement engine from a nearby auto shop, Jair engages in a car chase to make her trip much more difficult. The second assassin named Jim also pursues Michiko, all for the sake of wanting money after losing his late wife Akasha, but Jim fails to land a hit on Michiko. As Jair catches up to the two of them, he shoots Jim and offers Michiko a ride, calling a truce for the time being. Jim makes it out alive, but jumps off a bridge into the river to avoid getting arrested by the police. Maddened after seeing that Schinske is still alive, Satoshi runs Schinske over with his car, but not even that could kill Schinske, who finds this quite amusing despite being injured.
15	"Graffiti in Vain" (Grafite Desenhada em Vão); Transliteration: "Itazura ni Gurafuti" (Japanese: いたずらにグラフティ)	Yoshihiro Oka	5 February 2009	11 October 2015
At a bookstore, Hatchin catches sight of a book about a boy freeing a toucan from its cage to search for its family. An employee named Lenine, who learns that this book was recently sold, bumps into Hatchin in the marketplace, telling her to meet him at a church at three o'clock in the afternoon. Although he offers her a copy of the book as a gift and takes her to the top of the tower, she leaves him with the book, not knowing how to handle this sort of attention. Hatchin gets even more upset when Michiko tells her that Lenine passed by the hotel to drop off the book. When Hatchin goes back to the bookstore to return the book, the owner named João Marnie informs her that Lenine suffered memory loss after debris fell on his head following a gas leak explosion at the hotel. At night, Lenine finds her and vows never to forget her, which causes her to leave after being even more uncomfortable. On the following day, Lenine fails to recognize Hatchin, even though he remembers all what happened the previous day, causing her to later break down in front of Michiko.
16	"Etude of Crimson Inconstancy" (A Vermelha Descrendice); Transliteration: "Makka na Fujitsu no Echūdo" (Japanese: まっ赤な不実のエチュード)	Yoshimitsu Ōhashi	12 February 2009	18 October 2015
Michiko and Hatchin reach the tomato production plant, where they eventually meet Elis in her office. Aware that the two are searching for Hiroshi, Elis unexpectedly kisses Michiko to throw her off guard. Elis explains that Hiroshi ran away after knowing that Michiko was coming for him. Michiko is unsettled by the fact that Hiroshi came onto Elis first when he worked as a farmhand at the plant. After recalling that Hiroshi saw the news about Michiko breaking out of prison and abducting Hatchin from her adoptive family, Elis informs Michiko and Hatchin that Hiroshi is now in São Paraíso. When Atsuko and Ricardo finally reach the plant, Michiko and Hatchin take the elevator and travel down the shaft to evade, while Elis sets off smoke in the building to cover the security cameras as a distraction. Elis helps Michiko and Hatchin escape the plant from the basement, but she later tells Atsuko and Ricardo that the two are headed to São Paraíso.
17	"Buckets of Blood! Opera that Stirs the Heart" (Tonelada de Sangue! A Ópera que Mexe no Coração); Transliteration: "Chito! Kokoro Sawagu Opera" (Japanese: 血斗!心さわぐオペラ)	Kei Tsunematsu	12 February 2009	25 October 2015
When Michiko goes to pick up the fake passports that she requested from Pidan, the leader of a Chinese syndicate named Heike, she finds out that she was pickpocketed on the way there. Michiko tries to take the passports without pay, but is captured by Eduardo and Wen. Meanwhile, after failing to find Michiko while roaming the streets, Hatchin is taken in by a Chinese opera singer named Nei Feng-Yi. When Nei leaves to go search for Michiko, Nei's son Bebel Feng-Yi brags to Hatchin about how Nei is a great opera singer and a kindhearted father. In the Heike headquarters, Schinske soon asks Eduardo and Wen to help him find Satoshi, to which the two agree on friendly terms. On the roof, Nei later asks Eduardo and Wen to free Michiko, but he first must agree to a challenge. As he is blindfolded and tied to a rope with Michiko in tow, Nei runs across a steel beam off of the roof to decide his fate. Michiko manages to break free while pulling Nei up onto the steel beam, thereby completing the challenge. After receiving the passports, Michiko and Nei reunite with Hatchin and Bebel outside the opera house. Michiko initially scolds Hatchin for not staying where she was told to, but relents when Hatchin embraces her in a hug.
18	"The Fool's Ballistic Samba" (O Tolo que Avança como uma Bomba Sambista); Transliteration: "Akantare no Dandō Sanba" (Japanese: あかんたれの弾道サンバ)	Kotomi Ideai	19 February 2009	8 November 2015 (Note: On 31 October–1 November 2015, Adult Swim ran an Akame ga Kill! marathon of episodes 4-8 and show extra episodes of 9–11 due to daylight saving time.)
Michiko and Hatchin illegally cross the border checkpoint to São Paraíso, which is then reported on the news. As they happen upon a mister, who was formerly one of Hiroshi's old business associates, Michiko becomes forlorn after finding out that Hiroshi had not mentioned her at all. Hatchin watches a televised interview featuring Feliciano, assuming that he previously had offered Hiroshi a gig in a soap opera. She goes to a museum where Feliciano is scheduled to do a television shoot, but Feliciano instead rushes out of the place in his car after a disagreement with the script. As Hatchin fails to catch up to Feliciano, Atsuko helps Hatchin by showing where Feliciano resides. Breaking into his house and asking for Hiroshi, Hatchin is saddened when Feliciano says that Hiroshi probably played a role in a knockoff version of the soap opera. However, as a favor for Hatchin, Feliciano contacts Michiko, convincing her that he met Hiroshi at a bar, where Hiroshi turned down a part in the soap opera but mentioned great things about her. Michiko finally smiles as she looks out her window.
19	"Nettlesome Light-blocking Butterfly" (Irritante Borboleta que Interrompe a Luz); Transliteration: "Hagayui Shakō no Batafurai" (Japanese: はがゆい遮光のバタフライ)	Akira Toba	5 March 2009	15 November 2015
Satoshi has a run-in with Heike, but he manages to escape before Schinske arrives. Meanwhile, Michiko and Hatchin manage to hop on a freight train bound for Goiana, being able to hide from Ricardo's sharp eyes. On the freight train, Atsuko tries to negotiate with Michiko, offering a passport that would be her ticket to freedom, while Hatchin attempts to reason with Satoshi, who is looking for Hiroshi as well. Schinske's subordinate Chas drives in front of the freight train, causing a detrimental crash on the railroad tracks. After Satoshi takes Michiko's scooter and drives off with Hatchin in tow, Michiko reaches for Atsuko's gun tossed aside in desperation, but not long before taking hits from Atsuko. As Michiko departs, Atsuko cries while reminiscing childhood memories about Michiko.
20	"Rendezvous of Extermination" (Chacina no Encontro Amoroso); Transliteration: "Minagoroshi no Randevū" (Japanese: みな殺しのランデヴー)	Masato Miyoshi; Yoshimitsu Ōhashi	5 March 2009	22 November 2015
Satoshi and Hatchin arrive in a town, where Satoshi and Schinske left desolate ten years earlier. Satoshi calls Schinske and challenges him to settle matters once and for all. While waiting for Schinske to arrive, Hatchin is forced to share a room with Satoshi. After Satoshi explains that Hiroshi was his best friend since childhood, he questions Hatchin of whether she trusts in Michiko or not. Meanwhile, Michiko gets herself in a car accident after being chased by the police, but after she manages to survive, she uses a police officer as a hostage to continue driving in the patrol car. Satoshi and Hatchin are raided by Heike, who end up defeated by Satoshi. To finally settle the score, Satoshi punishes Schinske by submerging his head in a bucket of water for ten minutes, a bet he made with Schinske many years before, though Schinske does not survive. Michiko kicks the officer out of the patrol car, then forces her way through the police barricade on her way to Goiana.
21	"Last Waltz Blooming Out of Season" (A Última Valsa que Floresce Enlouquecida); Transliteration: "Kurui Saki Rasuto Warutsu" (Japanese: 狂い咲きラストワルツ)	Tetsurō Araki; Kei Tsunematsu	12 March 2009	6 December 2015 (Note: On the broadcast night of 28–29 November 2015, Adult Swim hosted a Parasyte marathon where they played episodes 1–7.)
Upon arrival at Goiana, Satoshi attempts to coerce a local crime boss named Juninho to search for Hiroshi. However, Juninho is already out to get Hiroshi for some outstanding debts. As a result, Satoshi injures Juninho and takes back the money, not wanting to be responsible for the paying out the debts. Meanwhile, as Michiko continues to elude police, she ends up cornered at a traveling carnival, taking three carnival workers as hostages. As the police shut down the main power, she still manages to escape in the streets. One of the policemen accidentally shoots a hostage, and the lead detective decides to pin the killing on Michiko. Hatchin goes out on the streets to look for Michiko, not heeding Satoshi's warnings. When Satoshi finds Hatchin, Juninho attempts many times to snipe Satoshi from a distance. Satoshi takes the hit when Hatchin calls out for Michiko and leaves herself out in the open. Michiko drives her scooter and takes Hatchin with her, evading from being shot at by Satoshi. Juninho and his men gun down Satoshi in an alleyway as he says his name and vows to kill them. Elsewhere, Michiko and Hatchin are surrounded by the police force.
22	"Run as You Are" (Corra Simplesmente como se Deve Correr); Transliteration: "Arinomama de Hashire" (Japanese: ありのままで走れ)	Yoshihiro Oka; Sayo Yamamoto	19 March 2009	13 December 2015
After Hatchin mentions to Michiko that she briefly saw Hiroshi in the streets, Hatchin attacks the police captain as a distraction for Michiko to take hold of a patrol car. However, Michiko and Hatchin are blocked by the police after being chased. The police captain is given his gun, but as he pulls the trigger at the two, he realizes that he was holding an unloaded gun. Ricardo arrives at the scene to investigate, but Atsuko prevents him from arresting Michiko and restraining Hatchin. Michiko and Hatchin run to the train station, where Michiko and Hiroshi finally reunite, and the three of them stay at an inn overnight. Michiko schedules a morning flight for Hatchin and Hiroshi to go back home, telling Hatchin that this is not their goodbye. Ten years later, Hatchin works at a restaurant and raises her only son. After learning on the news that Michiko was arrested, Hatchin attempts to send a letter to her, but it came back undeliverable. Hatchin later deduces that the anonymous packages that she received in the mail was delivered by Michiko from different cities across the country. After a long travel, Michiko and Hatchin reunite in the middle of the road.
