= The Cockpit (OVA) =

1993 anime anthology film about World War II

ザ・コクピット (Za Kokupitto)
- Genre: Historical, Military
- Original video animation
- Directed by: Yoshiaki Kawajiri (ep 1); Takashi Imanishi (ep 2); Ryōsuke Takahashi (ep 3)
- Written by: Yoshiaki Kawajiri (ep 1); Takashi Imanishi (ep 2); Ryōsuke Takahashi (ep 3)
- Music by: Masahiro Kawasaki (ep 1); Akira Inoue (ep 2); Kaoru Wada (ep 3)
- Studio: Madhouse (ep 1); Jacom (ep 2); Visual 80 (ep 3)
- Licensed by: Urban Vision
- Released: October 22, 1993
- Runtime: 30 minutes each
- Episodes: 3

The Cockpit (Japanese: ザ・コクピット, Hepburn: Za Kokupitto) is a Japanese original video animation series based on Leiji Matsumoto's World War II manga Battlefield. The OVA series is written and directed by Yoshiaki Kawajiri, Takashi Imanishi, and Ryousuke Takahashi.

Kawajiri's Slipstream follows a Luftwaffe pilot on his mission to protect Germany's trump card: the world's first atomic bomb. Imanishi's Sonic Boom Squadron explores the last hours of a Yokosuka MXY-7 Ohka pilot on August 6, 1945. Takahashi's Knight of the Iron Dragon tells the story of two Japanese soldiers in Leyte as they attempt to keep a promise.

== Plot ==
=== Slipstream ===
Captain Erhardt Von Rheindars, a German fighter pilot who is disgraced for abandoning his Focke-Wulf Fw 190 after his wingman, Lt. Hartmann, is shot down by three enemy Supermarine Spitfires of the Royal Air Force during a night recon mission, is assigned to escort a captured American Boeing B-17 Flying Fortress bomber flying to Peenemünde. The bomber is to carry his childhood sweetheart, her scientist father and a fearsome secret cargo - a Nazi atomic bomb - and for the mission, he is given a prototype Ta 152H1, following complaints about the high altitude performance of his Fw 190. The night before the mission, Rheindars's sweetheart begs him to let enemy planes destroy the bomber before "humanity sells its soul to the Devil forever", even if it means that she and her father will die. On the next day, the escort is attacked by three more RAF Spitfires, two of which are shot down by Rheindars using his Ta 152. However, to ensure the nuclear bomb cannot be used in the future, he allows the final Spitfire to destroy the bomber before downing it, then flies off, declaring himself as "the man who did not sell his soul to the Devil."

=== Sonic Boom Squadron ===
On August 5, 1945, a Japanese squadron of G4M "Betty" bombers, each carrying an Ohka and escorted by A6M2 Reisen fighters, attempts a raid on an American aircraft carrier battle group in the Pacific Ocean. As the raiders are attacked by American carrier-based aircraft, Ensign Nogami, a young Ohka pilot, demands to be launched in his Ohka, even if it means he misses his target, but his Betty's crew refuses, and he is knocked out and thrown out of the bomber. Nogami awakens in time to open his parachute, witnessing the destruction of the bombers before his eyes. He returns to base, where he meets the crew of the Betty who will fly him on a mission the following day, as well as two surviving Reisen pilots who vow to help him succeed in his mission if it costs them their lives. On board the American carrier, the pilots receive news from their captain that the attacking bombers were carrying Ohkas, capable of flying much faster than the carrier's complement of F6F Hellcats.

The next day, August 6, the Japanese attempt a second raid on the same battle group. An intense aerial dogfight ensues as the American carrier aircraft attempt to thwart the raiders from launching their Ohkas. Nogami begs his crew to cut him loose, but the plane isn't close to the American fleet just yet and holds off on letting him go. A Hellcat pursues Nogami's bomber, and inflicts serious damage, but the latter is saved by the intervention of one of the Reisen pilots, who crashes his aircraft into it, destroying both planes. This enables the Betty to get within visual range of the battle group, and Nogami is launched in his Ohka just before the wing of the bomber disintegrates and explodes. He flies through a wall of anti-aircraft fire thrown up by the escorting vessels and crashes into the American Essex-class aircraft carrier. Having survived the collision, the battle group's commander finds the photograph of Nogami's girlfriend that he had been carrying, which was launched into the carrier's bridge when the Ohka crashed into its superstructure. He then receives word that an atomic bomb has just been dropped on Hiroshima, and, after reacting in shock, has just enough time to ponder "are we all crazy?" before the carrier explodes and sinks.

=== Knight of the Iron Dragon ===
In Leyte, Private Kodai and Private Utsunomiya attempt to reach an air base in order to fulfill a promise despite the fact that it might have been rendered moot in the reality of war. The Japanese soldiers make their way by motorcycle, and along the way are ambushed by a captured Kawasaki Ki-61, but the American pilot loses control and crashes. The soldiers continue on while Utsunomiya hides the fact that he was shot by the captured Ki-61. Later, they are attacked by an American soldier riding a motorcycle. Kodai treats this as a race and makes the soldier crash. When the air base is on the horizon Kodai kicks Utsunomiya off the motorcycle and declares that he is going to cross the finish line. Private Kodai races towards the base and is gunned down by American soldiers. Utsunomiya dies of his wounds and the American soldier that attacked them on a motorcycle remarks "if that was a race he would have been the winner, but in a real race no one shoots at you at the finish line".

=== Principal cast ===
Character	Voice actor	English dub
Lt. Rheindars	Kenyu Horiuchi	Richard Cansino
Ensign Nogami	Hikaru Midorikawa	Kirk Thornton
Private Kodai	Ichirō Nagai	Robert Maffia
Private Utsunomiya	Kappei Yamaguchi	Luis Robledo

== Home video release ==
The anthology was first released in English in the UK on VHS by Kiseki Films, with this translation later being released on DVD in a double feature in alongside Digital Devil. A separate translation was later released in the North American market by Urban Vision, and it has yet to be released on Region 1 DVD. However, it's not clear whether the niche appeal of the content in general, its controversial "positive" portrayal of Axis soldiers, loss of the license, or all of the above, are the reasons behind its lack of a bilingual release on DVD. It was available in that format in Japan, however. A Blu-ray version was released in Japan by Pony Canyon on August 24, 2013.

== Manga publication ==
While there is no official North American release of the manga, Frederik L. Schodt included a translated excerpt of the series in his Manga! Manga! The World of Japanese Comics book.

There was also an untranslated panel from the strip which made a "cameo" in episode 101 of the Galaxy Express 999 anime.

== See also ==
- Zipang
