= Party 7 =

- Official promotional poster
- Directed by: Katsuhito Ishii
- Written by: Katsuhito Ishii
- Produced by: Hilo Iizumi; Shunsuke Koga; Kazuto Takida
- Starring: Masatoshi Nagase; Keisuke Horibe; Akemi Kobayashi; Yoshinori Okada; Yoshio Harada; Tadanobu Asano; Tatsuya Gasyuin
- Cinematography: Hiroshi Machida
- Edited by: Yumiko Doi
- Music by: James Shimoji
- Production companies: Intrinsic; Tohokushinsha Film Corporation
- Distributed by: Synapse Films; Third Window Films; Tohokushinsha Film Corporation
- Release dates: September 27, 2000 (Filmfest Hamburg); October 15, 2000 (Raindance); November 4, 2000 (HIFF); November 14, 2000 (Stockholm International Film Festival)
- Running time: 104 minutes
- Country: Japan
- Language: Japanese

Party 7 is a 2000 Japanese surreal comedy film written and directed by Katsuhito Ishii. The film features an ensemble cast including Masatoshi Nagase, Keisuke Horibe, Akemi Kobayashi, Yoshinori Okada, Yoshio Harada, Tadanobu Asano, and Tatsuya Gasyuin. The film follows two voyeurs who watch a Japanese gangster and his bizarre guests in a hotel room.

Party 7 premiered at Filmfest Hamburg on September 27, 2000.

== Synopsis ==
Seeking refuge from members of his gang, Miki flees to a secluded hotel in New Mexico. However, people from his past begin to show up at his door bringing trouble with them. The hotel owner, only going by the alias Captain Banana, watches them through a hidden room alongside his new nephew Okita, a renowned peeping tom.

== Cast ==
- Masatoshi Nagase as Shunichirô Miki
- Keisuke Horibe as Shingo Sonoda
- Akemi Kobayashi as Kana Mitsukoshi
- Yoshinori Okada as Todohei Todohira
- Yoshio Harada as Captain Banana
- Tadanobu Asano as Okita Souji
- Tatsuya Gasyuin as Wakagashi
- Yoneko Matsukane as Travel Agent
- Yoshiyuki Morishita as Baldie
