= Dejima Japanese Film Festival =

The Dejima Japanese Film Festival was named after the artificial island Dejima in the bay of Nagasaki, which was used by the Dutch to trade with the Japanese starting in the 17th century. The festival was aimed at the current state of Japanese cinema. The first edition in May 2005 was held in Amsterdam in cinema Het Ketelhuis. A second edition was held in November 2006, in Amsterdam, Rotterdam and Utrecht.

== Audience Award winners ==
- 2005 - The Taste of Tea (茶の味)
- 2006 - The Milkwoman (いつか読書する日)

== Personnel ==
The festival was founded and co-directed and co-programmed by Rob van Ham and Luc Lafleur in 2005. After 2005 Rob van Ham left the festival and Luc Lafleur became the only director of the 2006 edition. For both editions Geert van Bremen acted as a Japan intermediary and for the 2006 edition as a co-programmer.
