= Yoshinori Okada =

Japanese actor (born 1977)

- Born: 19 March 1977 (age 49); Ōno, Gifu, Japan
- Occupation: Actor
- Years active: 1994–present
- Spouse: Tomoko Tabata (m. 2018)
- Children: 2

Yoshinori Okada (岡田 義徳) (born 19 March 1977 in Ōno, Gifu) is a Japanese actor. He has starred several TV series such as Atsuhime (2008) and Nobuta. O Produce (2005) as well as movies such as Densha otoko (2005). He is a high school graduate and does not have a college degree. He won the award for best supporting actor at the 31st Yokohama Film Festival for Nonchan Noriben.

== Filmography ==
=== Film ===
- Like Grains of Sand (1996)
- Kisarazu Cat's Eye: Nihon Series (2003) as Ucchi
- Kamikaze Girls (2004)
- Densha Otoko (2005)
- Tekkonkinkreet (2006) as Vanilla
- Kisarazu Cat's Eye: World Series (2006) as Ucchi
- Fine, Totally Fine (2008)
- Nonchan Noriben (2009)
- I Am a Hero (2016) as Sango
- The Confidence Man JP: The Movie (2019)
- Three Nobunagas (2019) as Oda Nobunaga?
- Thank you, My Highlight vol.04 (2019)
- Your Eyes Tell (2020)
- Daughter of Lupin: The Movie (2021)
- The Three Young-Men in Midnight: The Movie (2022) as Mattsun
- The Three Young-Men in Midnight: The Movie 2 (2024) as Mattsun
- Symphony of Smoldering Chaos (2024)
- How to Forget You (2025) as Ikeuchi
- Coffee After All (2026)

=== Television ===
- Iguana Girl (1996)
- Kisarazu Cat's Eye (2002) as Ucchi
- Nobuta. O Produce (2005) as Takeshi Yokoyama
- Sexy Voice and Robo (2007) as Hideyoshi Nanashi
- Hanazakari no Kimitachi e (2007) as Ashiya Shizuki, Ashiya Mizuki's brother
- Hanazakari no Kimitachi e (Special, 2008) as Ashiya Shizuki, Ashiya Mizuki's brother
- Atsuhime (2008) as Shimazu Tadayuki, Atsuhime's brother
- The Quiz Show (2008)
- 1 Pound no Fukuin (2008) as Ueda
- Atashinchi no Danshi (2009) as Ohkura Takeru, Ohkura Shinjo's 2nd son
- Todome no Kiss (2018) as Koichi Nezu
- Young GTO (2020) as Enatsu

=== Dubbing ===
- Madagascar (2005) as Melman
- Madagascar: Escape 2 Africa (2008) as Melman
- Madagascar 3: Europe's Most Wanted (2012) as Melman
