= Yoshiyuki Morishita =

Japanese actor

- Born: 4 December 1962 (age 63); Tokyo, Japan
- Occupation: Actor
- Years active: 1996-present

Yoshiyuki Morishita (森下 能幸, Morishita Yoshiyuki; born 4 December 1962) is a Japanese actor. He has appeared in more than eighty films since 1996.

== Selected filmography ==
=== Film ===
Year	Title	Role	Notes	Ref.
1999	Shark Skin Man and Peach Hip Girl			
2001	Ichi the Killer	Bar Patron		
2001	The Happiness of the Katakuris	Officer Miyake		
2002	Border Line			
2002	Ju-on: The Grudge	Keibiin		
2003	Kill Bill: Volume 1	Tokyo Business Man	American film	
2004	Survive Style 5+	Burglar		
2005	Tomie: Beginning	Satoru Takagi		
2007	X-Cross	Yae		
2018	Louder!: Don't See What You Are Singing			
2019	Ghost Master			
2019	Family of Strangers			
2020	My Name is Yours			
2021	The Master			
2021	Every Trick in the Book			
2021	Shrieking in the Rain			
2022	Everything Will Be Owlright!			
2023	Minna Ikiteiru	Sasaki		
2023	The Dry Spell	Ishikawa		
2024	Cloud	Murota		
2024	The Quiet Yakuza 2: Part 1			
2024	The Quiet Yakuza 2: Part 2			

=== Television ===
Year	Title	Role	Notes
2015	Kamen Rider Ghost	Chikara Saionji	
2016	Midnight Diner: Tokyo Stories		
2017	Naotora: The Lady Warlord		Taiga drama
