= Takeo Kikuchi =

Japanese designer

Takeo Kikuchi (菊池 武夫, Kikuchi Takeo, born May 25, 1939) is a Japanese industrial and fashion designer.

== Career ==
Kikuchi is best known for his eponymous brand, "Takeo Kikuchi," (founded in 1984) which has significantly influenced Japanese men's fashion. He designs objects such as spectacle frames and chronographs in addition to clothing.

In 2004, Kikuchi bowed out from designing at his own self-named brand, entrusting creative direction to Taishi Nobukuni, a graduate of London's St. Martin's College. The rejuvenated label has regained some of its former glory with a funky mix of 1970s vintage looks and contemporary street styling a huge commercial and critical success.
