= Funky Forest =

- DVD cover
- Directed by: Katsuhito Ishii; Hajime Ishimine; Shunichiro Miki
- Written by: Katsuhito Ishii; Hajime Ishimine; Shunichiro Miki
- Produced by: Norihisa Harada
- Starring: Tadanobu Asano; Susumu Terajima; Ryō Kase; Rinko Kikuchi; Mariko Takahashi; Hideaki Anno
- Cinematography: Kosuke Matsushima; Hiroshi Machida
- Music by: Midorikawa Tooru
- Distributed by: AOI Promotion
- Release dates: 22 October 2005 (Hawaii); February 2006 (YIFFF)
- Running time: 150 minutes
- Country: Japan
- Languages: Japanese; Mandarin; English

Funky Forest: The First Contact (Japanese: ナイスの森 THE FIRST CONTACT, Hepburn: Naisu no Mori THE FIRST CONTACT; lit. Nice Forest: The First Contact), also known as Funky Forest: The First Encounter or simply Funky Forest, is a 2005 Japanese surrealist anthology science fiction comedy film co-written and co-directed by Katsuhito Ishii, Hajime Ishimine and Shunichiro Miki. It is composed of several storylines, some of which coincide, most of which are comical.

== Cast ==
- Tadanobu Asano
- Susumu Terajima
- Ryō Kase as Takefumi
- Rinko Kikuchi
- Mariko Takahashi
- Hideaki Anno
- Moyoco Anno
- Kazue Fukiishi
- Chiduru Ikewaki
- Shihori Kanjiya
- Andrew Alfieri

== Release ==
The film was released on Region 1 DVD in March 2008.

The film was released on Region Free Blu Ray by Error 4444 together with Third Window Films United States, Canada and Europe in 2021.
