= Monster (manga) =

Japanese manga series and its adaptations

- First tankōbon volume cover, featuring Kenzo Tenma
- Genre: Crime; Mystery; Psychological thriller
- Manga
- Written by: Naoki Urasawa
- Published by: Shogakukan
- English publisher: NA: Viz Media
- Imprint: Big Comics
- Magazine: Big Comic Original
- Original run: December 1994 – 20 December 2001
- Volumes: 18
- Novel

Another Monster
- Written by: Naoki Urasawa
- Published by: Shogakukan
- Published: 21 June 2002
- Anime television series
- Directed by: Masayuki Kojima
- Produced by: Hiroshi Yamashita (1–10); Toshio Nakatani (11–74); Manabu Tamura; Takuya Yui; Masao Maruyama
- Written by: Tatsuhiko Urahata
- Music by: Kuniaki Haishima
- Studio: Madhouse
- Licensed by: AUS: Siren Visual; NA: Viz Media (former); Discotek Media (current); SEA: Odex
- Original network: Nippon TV
- English network: CA: Super Channel; US: Syfy, Chiller, Funimation Channel
- Original run: 7 April 2004 – 28 September 2005
- Episodes: 74
- icon

Monster (stylized in all caps) is a Japanese manga series written and illustrated by Naoki Urasawa. It was published by Shogakukan in its seinen manga magazine Big Comic Original between December 1994 and December 2001, with its chapters collected in 18 tankōbon volumes. The story follows Kenzo Tenma, a Japanese neurosurgeon in Düsseldorf, Germany, whose life unravels after encountering Johan Liebert, a former patient. Johan is a sociopathic serial killer that murders and manipulates others to murder anyone who sees his face—enforcing absolute anonymity to prove his nihilistic philosophy.

Urasawa later wrote and illustrated the novel Another Monster, a story detailing the events of the manga from an investigative reporter's point of view, which was published in 2002. The manga was adapted by Madhouse into a 74-episode anime television series, which aired on Nippon Television from April 2004 to September 2005. The manga and anime were both licensed by Viz Media for English releases in North America, and the anime was broadcast on several television channels. Siren Visual licensed the anime in Australia.

Monster was Urasawa's first work to receive international acclaim and success. It has over 20 million copies in circulation and has won several awards, including the third Tezuka Osamu Cultural Prize and the 46th Shogakukan Manga Award. The anime series adaptation is considered to be one of the best anime series of all time.

== Plot ==
Dr. Kenzo Tenma is a highly skilled Japanese neurosurgeon working at Eisler Memorial Hospital in Düsseldorf, West Germany. Though professionally accomplished and engaged to Eva Heinemann, the hospital director's daughter, he becomes disillusioned with the institution's practice of prioritizing politically influential patients over those in dire need. This ethical dilemma culminates when fraternal twins Johan and Anna Liebert are admitted after a massacre, with Johan requiring emergency surgery for a gunshot wound to the head. When the mayor arrives shortly after, also in critical condition, Tenma disregards orders and operates on Johan. Though the boy survives, the mayor dies, and Tenma faces severe repercussions—his career stalls, his engagement ends, and he is ostracized by his colleagues. Soon after, Director Heinemann and several doctors who opposed Tenma are murdered, and the twins disappear. Though Tenma is suspected, no evidence links him to the crimes, leaving him to confront the consequences of his choice.

Years later, Tenma has regained his standing as Chief of Surgery. His life is upended when he treats Adolf Junkers, a criminal who cryptically warns of a "monster". Visiting Junkers later, Tenma finds the guard dead and the patient missing. Tracking him to a construction site, he witnesses Junkers held at gunpoint by Johan, now a young man. Despite Tenma's pleas, Johan executes Junkers, then coldly assures Tenma he would never harm the man who saved him. Stunned, Tenma realizes his act of mercy has unleashed a remorseless killer.

Now a suspect in a string of murders, Tenma draws the attention of the BKA Inspector Heinrich Lunge, who doggedly pursues him as the prime culprit. Determined to expose Johan, Tenma seeks out Anna, now living as Nina Fortner with an adoptive family in Heidelberg. Though she appears to have moved on, she suffers from recurring nightmares. On her 20th birthday, Tenma warns her of Johan's return, but he fails to prevent Johan from murdering her adoptive parents, re-traumatizing her.

Tenma's investigation reveals Johan's origins in a clandestine East German eugenics project at Kinderheim 511, an orphanage that brainwashed children using psychological manipulation and twisted literature. The experiments molded Johan into a calculating killer, his crimes part of a larger scheme to spread chaos. As Tenma uncovers more victims—former Kinderheim inmates, investigators, and civilians—he resolves to stop Johan, despite grappling with the moral implications of killing.

His pursuit spans Germany and, eventually, Czechoslovakia, unravelling a labyrinth of conspiracies while evading authorities and Johan's followers. Each revelation strengthens his conviction to end the cycle of violence, even as the psychological toll mounts. Tenma's journey becomes one of redemption, pitting him against the very evil he once saved, as he strives to atone for his past and halt the devastation Johan has wrought.

== Production ==
Urasawa revealed that he pitched the idea of a manga concerning the medical field around 1986, but could tell his editor did not enjoy the idea. Therefore, he jokingly proposed a story about women's judo, and that lead to his first solo work Yawara! (1986–1993).

The original idea for Monster came from the 1960s American television series The Fugitive, which had a strong impact on Urasawa when he saw it at the age of eight. In the story, a doctor is wrongfully convicted of murder, but escapes and searches for the real killer while on the run from the police. He said that his editor was adamant that the series would not do well, and tried to stop him from writing it.

The Japanese medical industry was strongly influenced by the professional practices in Germany, and so it seemed natural to the author to set Monster in Germany. Post-war Germany was chosen so that the neo-Nazi movement could be included in the story. When the semi-monthly Monster began publication at the end of 1994, Urasawa was already writing Happy! weekly and continued to serialize both at the same time. When Happy! ended in 1999, he began the weekly 20th Century Boys. Writing both Monster and 20th Century Boys at the same time caused him to be briefly hospitalized for exhaustion.

== Media ==
=== Manga ===
Written and illustrated by Naoki Urasawa, Monster was serialized in Shogakukan's seinen manga magazine Big Comic Original from December 1994 to 20 December 2001. Shogakukan collected its 162 chapters into 18 tankōbon volumes released from 30 June 1995 to 28 February 2002. Takashi Nagasaki is credited as "co-producer" of the manga's story. Monster received a nine-volume kanzenban re-release between 30 January and 29 August 2008.

Monster was licensed in North America by Viz Media, which published all 18 volumes between 21 February 2006 and 16 December 2008. They released the kanzenban version of the series, titled Monster: The Perfect Edition, between 15 July 2014 and 19 July 2016.

=== Anime ===
The manga series was adapted into an anime by Madhouse, which aired between 7 April 2004 and 28 September 2005 on Nippon TV. Directed by Masayuki Kojima and written by Tatsuhiko Urahata, it features original character designs by long-time Studio Ghibli animator Kitarō Kōsaka, which were adapted for the anime by Shigeru Fujita. The music was composed by Kuniaki Haishima, including the opening theme "Grain".

David Sylvian was commissioned to write the first ending theme, "For the Love of Life", on which he collaborated with Haishima. In the cover notes to the official soundtrack he said, "I was attracted to the Monster material by the moral dilemma faced by its central character. The calm surface of the music giving way to darker undercurrents, signifying the conscience of the lead protagonist and the themes of morality, fate, resignation, and free will." It was used for the first 32 episodes. The second ending theme, "Make It Home" by Fujiko Hemming, was used for the remaining 42 episodes. It is the only song Hemming sung in her career.

The credit sequence features illustrations from the fictional book Obluda, Která Nemá Své Jméno (The Monster Who Didn't Have A Name) by Emil Scherbe, which was published by Shogakukan on 30 September 2008.

An English dub of Monster was produced by Salami Studios for Viz Media, which owned the North American license to the anime. The show aired on Syfy's Ani-Mondays with two episodes back-to-back each Monday night at 11:00 pm EST, beginning 12 October 2009, as well as on its sister network Chiller. A DVD box set of the series, containing the first 15 episodes was released 8 December 2009. However, due to low sales of the first box set, Viz decided not to release the remaining episodes on DVD and later dropped the license. Monster began airing on Canada's Super Channel on 15 March 2010, and on the Funimation Channel on 3 April 2010 on weekends at 12:30 am. The series was also available digitally from several internet retailers. Siren Visual licensed the series for Australia in 2013, and released it in five DVD volumes beginning in November 2013.

Netflix began streaming the series internationally on 1 January 2023, premiering the first 30 episodes; the entire 74 episodes were made available for the following month. In August 2025, Discotek Media announced that it had licensed the series and would release it on Blu-ray in 2026.

=== Live-action adaptations ===
In 2005, it was announced that New Line Cinema acquired the rights for an American live-action film adaptation of Monster. Academy Award-nominated screenwriter Josh Olson, known for A History of Violence, was hired to write the screenplay. No new information on the film has been released since.

In 2013, it was revealed that Guillermo del Toro and American premium television network HBO were collaborating on a pilot for a live-action TV series based on Monster. Co-executive producer Stephen Thompson, known for Doctor Who and Sherlock, was announced to be writing the pilot, while del Toro was to direct and serve as executive producer alongside Don Murphy and Susan Montford. In 2015, del Toro told Latino-Review that HBO had passed on the project and that they were in the process of pitching to other studios.

== Reception ==
=== Manga ===
Monster has been critically acclaimed. It won an Excellence Prize in the Manga Division at the first Japan Media Arts Festival in 1997 and the Grand Prize of the third Tezuka Osamu Cultural Prize in 1999. It also won the 46th Shogakukan Manga Award in the General category in 2001 and the Best Manga Series at the Lucca Comics Awards in 2004. The Young Adult Library Services Association placed Monster on their 2007 "Great Graphic Novels for Teens" list. Viz Media's English release was nominated several times for Eisner Awards, twice in the category Best U.S. Edition of International Material – Japan (2007 and 2009) and three times in Best Continuing Series (2007, 2008, 2009). In 2009, when Oricon conducted a poll asking which manga series Japanese audiences wanted to see adapted into live-action, Monster came in fifth. At the 2009 Industry Awards held by the Society for the Promotion of Japanese Animation, the organizers of Anime Expo, Monster won the award for Best Drama Manga. The Monster manga has had over 20 million copies in circulation.

Writing for Time, Pulitzer Prize for Fiction winner Junot Díaz praised the manga, proclaiming "Urasawa is a national treasure in Japan, and if you ain't afraid of picture books, you'll see why". About.com's Deb Aoki called Monster a multi-layered suspense series and satisfying mystery that stands up to repeat readings, although noting that it was sometimes a "little hard to follow". Reviewing the Monster manga for Anime News Network, Carl Kimlinger called Urasawa a master of suspense, "effortlessly maintaining the delicate balance of deliberate misinformation and explicit delineation of the dangers facing protagonists that only the finest suspense thrillers ever achieve." He commented that even the stories and characters that had felt unrelated to the greater picture are "eventually drawn together by Johan's grand plan." Kimlinger deemed the art "invisible perfection," never "showy or superfluous," with panels laid out so well that it was easy to forget how much effort was put into each and every page. Though he did not find the characters' physical designs attractive, he praised their expressiveness, writing that the characters "wear their personalities on their faces, communicating changes in their outlooks, psychology, inner thoughts and emotions with shifts in expression that range from barely perceptible to masks of rage, hate and fear." UK Anime Network gave the first volume a perfect score based on the engrossing story, but felt the artwork, while appealing, was not "groundbreaking". On the other hand, Active Anime felt the art improved across the manga's serialization.

A.E. Sparrow of IGN described Monster as a "Hitchcock film set to manga" and felt its real strength came from its huge cast of interesting characters, who each had "a unique story and history to relate". Carlo Santos, also of Anime News Network, called Monster "a one-of-a-kind thriller" and suggested that one of the most overlooked qualities of it is that "amidst all the mystery and horror, there are moments of love and hope and all the good things about humanity." Though she praised the manga for its "cinematically precise" art, never confusing the reader, and making each person visually distinct despite the large cast of characters, Casey Brienza from the same website felt that too much time was spent developing minor characters "who are likely to be dead or forgotten just a few dozen pages later," and that the series' ending "went out with a whimper." Brienza noted that "there is nothing satisfactory ever revealed to fully account for [Johan's] supremely scrambled psyche," but concluded that as long as the reader does not look for "deep meanings or think too hard about whether or not it all makes sense in the end" they will enjoy it. Leroy Douresseaux of Comic Book Bin, praised Monster's finale and wrote that the manga is "worth reading again and again. It's perfection".

=== Anime ===
The anime series adaptation is considered to be one of the best anime series of all time. THEM Anime Reviews called the series "complex" and "beautiful", stating that it features "sophisticated storytelling and complex plot weaving, memorable characters, godly production values and excellent pacing". Darius Washington of Otaku USA named Monster one of the ten best anime of the past decade. Carl Kimlinger enthused that it "cannot be overstated how brilliantly apart from the anime mainstream this unsettling, fiercely intelligent, and ultimately uncategorizable journey into darkness is." He praised Madhouse's animation for not only keeping up the dark "cinematic quality of Urasawa's art" but also improving on it, as well as Kuniaki Haishima's score for adding "immeasurably to the series' hair-raising atmosphere." Though he noted Viz Media's inability to acquire the original ending theme song due to licensing issues, Kimlinger also called their English dub of the series one of the best in recent memory.

Kimlinger praised the series, for "its fidelity to Naoki Urasawa's original manga", commenting that "there isn't a scene left out, only a handful added in, and as far as I can tell not a line of dialogue changed or omitted. Given its faithfulness, fans of the manga will know that the series won't get any better than this, this is as good as the series gets." He also described the ending of the series as, "we feel vaguely let down when what we should really be doing is glorying in the somewhat messy, yes, but exhilarating final throes of one of last decade's great series". Nonetheless, he considered such an ending to be expected, since "as ambitious and complicated and just plain huge as Monster is, no conclusion is going to be entirely satisfactory. Someone is bound to get short-changed, loose ends are bound to be left dangling, and even if they weren't, the simple truth is that no climax could ever live up to the series' build-up".
