= List of Monster characters =

The manga series Monster features a cast of characters created by Naoki Urasawa. The story revolves around Kenzo Tenma, a Japanese surgeon living in Germany whose life enters turmoil after getting himself involved with Johan Liebert, one of his former patients who is revealed to be a dangerous psychopath, hellbent on killing everyone who knows him.

== Main characters ==
=== Kenzo Tenma ===
Voiced by: Hidenobu Kiuchi (Japanese); Liam O'Brien (English)

Kenzo Tenma (天馬 賢三, Tenma Kenzō) is a Japanese neurosurgeon working at Eisler Memorial Hospital in Düsseldorf. Little is known of Tenma's childhood apart from his father and brother also being doctors and that his family ties grew weaker when he left Japan for Germany. He is a humanitarian who cares about the lives of others, and his kindness influences those he meets. His surgical skills earn him the position of chief neurosurgeon. He is engaged to Eva Heinemann, daughter of the hospital's Director Heinemann. When a young boy with a bullet wound arrives in 1986, Tenma is about to operate when the Chief of Surgery Dr. Oppenheim and Director Heinemann tell him to work on the mayor, who came in later instead. After a crisis of conscience, Tenma saves the life of the young boy who came in first, while the mayor dies. At a banquet, Tenma asks for forgiveness from Director Heinemann who forgives him while blacklisting him and appointing Dr. Boyer the new chief neurosurgeon. Eva also ends their engagement. Weeks later, Tenma gets word from the police that Director Heinemann, Dr. Oppenheim and Dr. Boyer have been mysteriously killed. The chairman of the board appoints Tenma Chief of Surgery, and Eva tries to reconcile, but Tenma ignores her.

Nine years later, Tenma learns that the doctors' murders were committed by the boy he saved when the now-grown boy, Johan Liebert, commits another assassination right in front of him. Johan is also the mastermind of the serial murders of middle-aged couples throughout Germany. Plagued by guilt, he resolves to find Johan and end the life of this "monster" he feels responsible for creating, while evading Inspector Lunge, who suspects Tenma of the murders. In his quest to kill Johan, Tenma nearly succeeds several times, only to have him slip away, until their final confrontation in Ruhenheim. When Johan wants Tenma to kill him, he threatens Wim Knaup when the child's drunk father mistakes Johan for a monster and shoots him. After Johan is flown to a hospital in a helicopter, Tenma treats him and is cleared of all charges. He later joins Doctors Without Borders, visits Johan's mother, and visits the comatose Johan in a police hospital.^{[ch. 161, 162]}

=== Johan Liebert ===
Voiced by: Nozomu Sasaki (Japanese); Keith Silverstein (English)

Johan Liebert (ヨハン・リーベルト, Yohan Rīberuto) is the older twin son of the Lieberts, whose father Michael was an East German trade advisor who defected to the West. He is the titular "monster" and the main antagonist of the series. The mystery of his past is the focus of the plot. He is called a monster, the next Adolf Hitler and the devil himself. Johan Liebert was shot in the head as a child when his parents were killed in their home, but he is saved from death by Dr. Tenma. He claims to love his twin sister Anna, and has some loyalty to her. Johan has spent parts of his life in different places under different names. He possesses charisma and intelligence but is also cunning, manipulative and deceitful; while he is seemingly kind, compassionate and loving to children, he is actually cold, cruel and fundamentally incapable of empathy. He uses his talents to manipulate and corrupt others, often with no apparent end except to cause suffering and destruction. His goal is to kill everyone who knows of his existence. He identifies with other killers, discovering their secrets. After causing the death of Peter Čapek, he orchestrates the Ruhenheim Massacre and has his final encounter with Tenma. When Johan threatens Wim to get Tenma to shoot him, Johan is shot by Wim's drunken father, Herbert.^{[ch. 160]} He is flown to a hospital in a helicopter, with the bullet wound treated by Tenma.^{[ch. 160]} Comatose, he is visited by Tenma in a police hospital. The final page shows his bed empty and an open window, ambiguously suggesting that Johan has either escaped the hospital or committed suicide by jumping to his death, depending on the spectator's interpretation.

==== Reception ====
Johan frequently appears on lists of the best villains in anime, manga, and fiction. Johan placed first in Paste's list of the "20 of the Greatest Villains in Anime", with Toussaint Egan saying that "despite all that he was able to accomplish over the course of Naoki Urasawa's Monster – manipulating over fifty people to kill one another through suggestion alone, framing the man who saved his life for murder, operating a massive money laundering operation at the heart of Germany, and coordinating a shadow network of killers to do his bidding— Johan has no special abilities to speak of, save for intelligence. No magical notebook capable of killing anyone whose name is written in its pages, no unholy totem gifting him with the blessing of divine fate, nothing. He is a human being, no more and no less, and that is precisely what makes him so terrifying."

=== Nina Fortner ===
Voiced by: Mamiko Noto (Japanese); Karen Strassman (English)

Anna Liebert (アンナ・リーベルト, Anna Rīberuto) is Johan's twin sister, the only physically unharmed survivor of the night her parents were killed and her brother was shot in what appeared to be a botched burglary. After she and Johan disappeared, she was adopted by the Fortner family from Heidelberg where she was named Nina Fortner (ニナ・フォルトナー, Nina Forutonā). Nina is a sweet, kind, loving, hardworking and intelligent young woman. She seemed to have a happy life as a law student at Heidelberg University and a practitioner of aikido, but discovers there are parts of her past she does not remember. At first, she had amnesia due to the psychological trauma of the attack. She lives in peace until Johan contacts her on their 20th birthday and has the Fortners killed. She then pursues Johan, with different methods and for a different reason than Tenma does. While Nina does not share her brother's psychosis, they have similar fears linked to their past. While Nina is primarily a pacifist, she will threaten (or kill) someone if she feels it necessary or to protect others. During a hypnosis session with Dr. Gillen, her personality changes and she attacks him. When she fully regains her memories, it is revealed that she was the twin taken by Franz Bonaparta to his Red Rose Mansion, when he committed mass murder.^{[ch. 142, 143]} Bonaparta then told her to forget what she saw and to run away and not "become monsters." She is also the one who shot Johan in the head at his own urging, after he killed the Lieberts. She is present at the Ruhenheim Massacre, where she tells her brother that she forgives him and tries to dissuade Tenma from shooting Johan. At the end of the series, Nina is graduating from college and plans to attend law school.

=== Inspector Lunge ===
Voiced by: Tsutomu Isobe (Japanese); Richard Epcar (English)

Heinrich Lunge (ハインリッヒ・ルンゲ, Hainrihhi Runge) is a BKA detective assigned to the murder case at Eisler Memorial Hospital. Lunge initially thinks Johan was imagined by Tenma as an excuse, but progresses to the belief Tenma suffers a split personality; with Tenma trying to force "Johan" to reveal himself. He seems devoid of emotion, which allows him to commit himself to every case on which he works. His devotion to his work comes at the expense of his personal life; during the series, his wife and pregnant daughter leave him. What he loves most is his job; Lunge missed a chance to meet his grandson for the first time to see Tenma's friends from Japan instead. He expresses some regret; during his fight with Roberto he seems angry to hear Roberto say how happy his wife was with another man, and his grandson saw that man as his grandfather. Lunge has an excellent memory, "entering data" into his mind by making typing gestures with his hands. His toughness drives a murder suspect to suicide, prompting his superiors to remove Lunge from all his cases. After the fire at LMU Munich, Lunge learns that Johan really exists. He then takes a "holiday" in Prague to track down Franz Bonaparta, author of a book which may reveal Johan's origins. Lunge ends up in Ruhenheim, meeting Grimmer and Tenma; apologizing to the latter for his mistakes, he heads off to a showdown with Roberto. Both are wounded in the shootout; Lunge survives, while Roberto dies of his wounds. While being carried away by a stretcher to the hospital, he blames Roberto for the Ruhenheim Massacre stating that Roberto was essentially responsible for what happened there. It is unknown why, but it is hinted that he does so to protect Tenma. After the Ruhenheim Massacre, Lunge visits Wolfgang Grimmer's grave along with Jan Suk and Fritz Verdemann. He tells them he is a professor at a police academy, and has rekindled his relationship with his daughter.

=== Dieter ===
Voiced by: Junko Takeuchi (Japanese); Laura Bailey (English)

Dieter (ディーター, Dītā) is a young boy Tenma encounters in his search for Johan. When Tenma first meets him, he is an orphan under the care of a man named Hartmann; Tenma later discovers that Dieter is physically and psychologically abused by Hartmann. Hartmann plans to make Dieter into another Johan by applying the same conditioning used in the 511 Kinderheim orphanage, but with no success. Dieter later becomes happier after being saved by Tenma from Hartmann's abuse. Dieter follows Tenma in his search for Johan to prevent Tenma from becoming a murderer because he is fond of him. He later teams up with Nina to help her find out more about her past and give her moral support when her traumatic memories resurface (since he was also subjected to similar abuse). Dieter seems to have absorbed some of Tenma's beliefs and optimism about life when he meets an injured young boy named Martin influenced by Johan to be more like the latter. The young boy recites what he heard Johan say about life, death and fear, and tries to tempt Dieter to walk along the ledge of a building with his eyes closed. Dieter refuses, saying he wants to live, to experience new things and see the faces of the people he loves; he repeats what he heard Tenma say: "Tomorrow will be better"-("Tomorrow will be a good day" in the English dub). Dieter helps Nina find out more about her past. By the end of the series he reunites with Otto Heckel, who tells Dieter to give information he dug up on where the mother of the Liebert twins is to Tenma.

=== Eva Heinemann ===
Voiced by: Mami Koyama (Japanese); Tara Platt (English)

Eva Heinemann (エヴァ・ハイネマン, Eva Haineman) is Tenma's fiancée and the daughter of the Director at Eisler Memorial Hospital. She is independent, superficial, bossy, loud, demanding, and manipulative. She is also cruel, taunting, demeaning, and hates not having her way. Although she claims to love Tenma, she sometimes treated him cruelly. After her father demotes Tenma for disobeying the former's orders, she callously breaks up with him. Director Heinemann's murder takes a toll on her. She tries to reconcile with Tenma, but he quietly rejects her. Several years and three failed marriages later, she meets Inspector Lunge where she reminisces about her time with Tenma. Nostalgic, Eva visits Tenma at the hospital and attempts to start over with him. When Eva is rejected again, she lashes out at him. She becomes an embittered alcoholic, using money from divorce settlements to finance her lifestyle. At one point she has a budding romance with her gardener, but after seeing his ex-wife visit his daughter at Christmas, Eva burns her house down in a drunken rage. Eva wanders throughout Germany and later becomes a patient of Dr. Reichwein's. Although she does not suspect Tenma caused her father's death, she obsessively hopes to see him suffer in prison in retaliation for his rejection of her. It is revealed that Eva followed Tenma nine years ago and saw Johan Liebert the night he murdered Adolf Junkers. As such she becomes a target of Roberto's. Peter Čapek and "the Baby" hire Martin to bring her to Frankfurt and guard, where she tries to mold Martin into a replica of Tenma. When Martin dies after a shootout, Eva is devastated. Although Tenma tells her to go by train to Munich to meet with Dr. Reichwein and tell the police what she knows about Johan, instead she plans revenge on those responsible for Martin's death and purchases a gun. Eva finds Kristoff Sievernich (partially responsible for Martin's death) and tries unsuccessfully to kill him. She is saved by Tenma who wounds Sievernich. Eva is later seen with Dieter at Dr. Reichwein's house where she mentions that the police did not believe her story that Johan Liebert was the culprit. During this time, Eva trades alcohol for cigarettes. At the end of the series, she becomes an interior decorator who has released her anger at Tenma and her grief for Martin when she visits Dr. Reichwein. In Another Monster, Eva explains that she left Tenma after Director Heinemann demoted him because her father needed a right-hand man who he could put his full trust in. Eva still emphasizes that breaking the engagement was her own conscious decision.

=== Werner Weber ===
Werner Weber (ヴェルナー・ウェーバー, Verunā Wēbā) is a freelancing journalist who is the main character of Another Monster. He interviewed people that were in the lives of Kenzo Tenma and Johan Liebert ranging from Tenma's childhood friends, Eva Heinemann, Inspector Lunge, Rudi Gillen, Karl Neumann, Jan Suk, Karel Lanke, and others. He disappears at the end of "Another Monster". His status is unknown.

== Supporting characters ==
=== Director Heinemann ===
Voiced by: Masaru Ikeda (Japanese); Steve Kramer (English)

Udo Heinemann (ウド・ハイネマン, Udo Haineman) is the Director of Eisler Memorial Hospital. He supervises Tenma and the other doctors and surgeons. Tenma is dissatisfied with hospital politics when he is ordered to treat an opera singer instead of a Turkish construction worker who arrived first. Tenma saves the singer, but the construction worker dies as a result of treatment delays from Dr. Becker. When the Liebert twins are brought in, Tenma is working on him when chief of surgery Dr. Oppenheim and Director Heinemann order him to treat the Mayor, who came in after them. When Tenma tells Director Heinemann that he is the only one who can successfully operate on Johan and to have Dr. Boyer handle the mayor for him, Heinemann ignores Tenma's request since the next review of medical facilities will have the Mayor promising increased funding to Eisler Memorial. Tenma's decision to operate on Johan causes the other doctors to scramble to cover for him at the last minute resulting in Roedecker's death. Director Heinemann states in a press conference that Mayor Roedecker died from a cerebral infarction and that they did their best to save him. When Tenma apologizes to Director Heinemann at a hospital banquet for what happened to Mayor Roedecker, Heinemann tells him not to worry about it and that he just followed his heart. However, Dr. Boyer will be assuming Tenma's chief neurosurgeon position. While Director Heinemann will allow Tenma to keep his surgeon job, he will not be accepting papers from him by the next health summit and won't recommend him in the event of a transfer. Angry about what Director Heinemann did, Tenma sits beside an unconscious Johan Liebert ranting about Heinemann's attitude and that he'd be better off dead. Director Heinemann later orders Dr. Oppenheim to have Dr. Boyer watch over the twins after hearing that Tenma was watching over them. Director Heinemann is later found dead when he, Dr. Oppenheim and Dr. Boyer were poisoned by candy left by Johan. Director Heinemann's death had its toll on Eva who broke down in tears during her father's funeral.

=== Dr. Oppenheim ===
Voiced by: Nobuaki Fukuda (Japanese); Kirk Thornton (English)

Dr. Oppenheim (オッペンハイム, Oppenhaimu) is the Chief of Surgery at Eisler Memorial, serving under Udo Heinemann. He has Tenma operate on F. Rosenbach while Dr. Becker treats the Turkish construction worker. When the Liebert twins came in, he hands Tenma his phone when Director Heinemann orders Tenma to treat Mayor Roedecker first. When Mayor Roedecker dies during surgery, Dr. Oppenheim berates Tenma for letting him die. He tells Tenma that he has already filed his report to Director Heinemann and that Mayor Roedecker's death is Temna's fault as he, Boyer, and the other doctor walk away. Director Heinemann later orders Dr. Oppenheim to put Dr. Boyer in charge of the twins after he heard that Tenma was watching them. With Director Heinemann and Dr. Boyer, Dr. Oppenheim is found dead when the three are poisoned with candy left by Johan Liebert. Dr. Oppenheim's death caused the chairman of the board to give his position to Tenma.

=== Dr. Boyer ===
Voiced by: Masahiko Tanaka (Japanese); Michael McConnohie (English)

Dr. Boyer (ボイラー, Boirā) is a surgeon at Kuta Baro Hospital. He and another doctor were to join Tenma for Mayor Roedecker's surgery. After Tenma operates on Johan Liebert instead, Dr. Boyer scolds Tenma for inadvertently causing Roedecker's death and stated that the doctors had to scramble to cover for him at the last minute. Because of this, Director Udo Heinemann appoints Dr. Boyer to be the new Head of Neurosurgery. When Anna Liebert collapses near Johan, Boyer is instructed to photograph her memory jog over Tenma's objections as part of Director Heinemann's "emergency image-saver" for retrieving hospital's costs. Dr. Boyer tells Tenma that Director Heinemann has put him in charge of the Liebert twins and that he can't argue with Director Heinemann on this. After Johan awakens, Dr. Boyer tells Tenma that he has served his purpose by saving Johan's life and orders Tenma to return to his post as Dr. Boyer enters Johan's room. Director Heinemann, Dr. Oppenheim and Dr. Boyer are later found dead where they were poisoned with candy left by Johan Liebert.

=== Dr. Becker ===
Voiced by: Yasuyoshi Hara (Japanese); Christopher Corey Smith (English)

Dr. Becker (ベッカー, Bekkā) is a surgeon at Eisler Memorial. While Dr. Tenma is treating opera singer F. Rosenbach on Dr. Oppenheim's orders, Dr. Becker handles the surgery of a Turkish construction worker who dies from treatment delays. When the Liebert twins are brought in, he helps Tenma with Johan's surgery. After Mayor Roedecker's death, Becker visits Tenma asking if he has heard from Director Udo Heinemann. When Director Heinemann, Dr. Oppenheim, and Dr. Boyer are found dead, Dr. Becker, Tenma and a nurse discover that the Liebert twins are gone. After Director Heinemann's funeral, Dr. Becker and Tenma are approached by Inspectors Weisbach and Lunge, who are searching for clues. When Tenma is arrested in Prague, Dr. Becker voices doubts to his patients that a good lawyer would represent him.

=== Detective Weisbach ===
Voiced by: Ryuji Nakagi (Japanese); David Lodge (English)

Benjamin Weisbach (ベンヤミン・ヴァイスバッハ, Ben'yamin Vaisubahha) is a Nordrhein-Westfalen police detective who is the first person to investigate the Lieberts' murder. At the hospital, he helps Anna Liebert remember her name and her brother. After Heinemann's funeral, he and Inspector Lunge approach Tenma for clues. Nine years later, Weisbach is near retirement when he brings apprehended murderer Rheinhardt Dinger to the police station. He later meets Rudi Gillen who is interrogating murderers whose murders do not match their modus operandi. When they ask Rheinhardt again, they are led by a clue leading to Johan Liebert.

=== Otto Heckel ===
Voiced by: Yoshito Yasuhara (Japanese); Doug Erholtz (English)

Otto Heckel (オットー・ヘッケル, Ottō Hekkeru) is a buck-toothed thief who runs into Tenma in chapter 17 when he breaks into a murder victim's house where Tenma is investigating. Heckel is not interested in solving the mystery surrounding the monster; he is preoccupied with making quick cash by any means necessary. Nonetheless, Tenma and Heckel must rely on each other in order to survive. Heckel becomes friends with Dieter around the time when Tenma has his encounter with "The Baby." By the end of the series, he resurfaces where he tells Dieter that he has located the mother of the Liebert twins for Tenma.

=== "The Baby" ===
Voiced by: Kazuo Kumakura (Japanese); Kirk Thornton (English)

"The Baby" (赤ん坊, Akanbō) is a short, elderly, neo-Nazi leader. He sees Johan as an ideal Aryan leader, who could become the next Adolf Hitler to lead Germany into prominence. The Baby works for four individuals who would welcome Johan as a political leader despite Nina and Tenma's constant insistence that Johan has no interest. He hopes to use Nina as bait to coerce Johan and as a precautionary measure to protect him (and the other group members) from Johan. This fails as Johan kills one of the four members of the organization. The Baby first appears to Nina from behind a red curtain, dancing to "Be My Baby". He is killed by an exotic dancer employed by Johan in a plot to destroy Peter Čapek and his organization.

=== General Wolf ===
Voiced by: Kōichi Kitamura (Japanese); Anthony Landor (English)

General Helmut Wolf (ヘルムート・ヴォルフ, Herumūto Vorufu) is an old soldier who was first to find the twins, gave Johan his name (the name of the boy in the picture book entitled The Monster without a Name) and sent him to 511 Kinderheim. Although a member of the right-wing organization whose goal is to make Johan the leader of Germany, Wolf does not actually want to make Johan a modern-day Führer. His family and acquaintances have been killed by Johan, teaching him true loneliness. Wolf asks Tenma to kill Johan for him. Tenma encounters Wolf again on his deathbed after the destruction of the Red Rose Mansion; before he dies, he begs Tenma to speak his name as proof he existed.

=== Rudi Gillen ===
Voiced by: Takayuki Sugo (Japanese); Derek Stephen Prince (English)

Rudi Gillen (ルディー・ギレン, Rudī Giren) is a criminologist and one of Tenma's former classmates at university (a former student of Dr. Reichwein). He helps Tenma by saving him from arrest and acquiring information about Johan from the criminals Johan has met. Gillen has some insight into Johan and his motives, but is still baffled by Johan's actions. Gillen later gives Nina hypnotherapy, during which she tries to attack him. Gillen and Inspector Weisbach later interrogate murderers who have killed people who do not fit their modus operandi. He later accompanies Nina to Ruhenheim, where they encounter some of the people whom Tenma evacuated. He tells one of the adults to have the children treated at a hospital and to have the authorities get to Ruhenheim as fast as they can. Gillen is later seen with Nina when Johan is shot by Herbert Knaup. In Another Monster, Gillen writes a best-seller about Johan and his string of murders. He believes that Johan is still in the hospital, but thinks it best to not interview him if he awakens.

=== Roberto ===
Voiced by: Nobuyuki Katsube (Japanese); JB Blanc (English)

Roberto (ロベルト, Roberuto) is a big, burly man and one of the many people from the 511 Kinderheim orphanage whom Johan controls. He admires Johan often serving as Johan's bodyguard and hitman. He is shot by Tenma and seems to fall over a balcony into a sea of flames, but returns as an attorney for Tenma under the alias Alfred Baul (アルフレート・バウル, Arufurēto Bauru). Largely faithful to Johan, he is thinner and his right arm is largely useless thanks to Tenma's bullet. When he first meets Nina Fortner, although Johan wishes no harm to his sister, Roberto leaves her to be killed by his men in order to protect Johan. Of Johan's henchmen, Roberto appears the most frequently as an enemy. While Roberto knows nothing about his past it is suggested that he is the nephew of a former high-level Czechoslovak secret police officer named Karel Lanke. Lanke tells a story about his sister who, with her husband, was shot trying to cross the Berlin Wall into West Germany; only their son, Adolf Reinhart (アドルフ・ラインハルト, Adorufu Rainharuto), survived the attack. As Adolf's legal guardian, Lanke signed papers turning his nephew over to 511 Kinderheim. Wolfgang Grimmer may be the only person who remembers him, considering him a friend during their time at the orphanage; Grimmer remembers that one of Adolf's favorite drinks was cocoa.^{[ch. 156]} Roberto is mortally wounded by Lunge in the Ruhenheim Massacre, but is able to kill Franz Bonaparta, who was going to shoot Johan, before succumbing to his wounds.

=== Hans Georg Schuwald ===
Voiced by: Michio Hazama (Japanese); Dan Woren (English)

Hans Georg Schuwald (ハンス・ゲオルグ・シューバルト, Hansu Georugu Shūbaruto), known as the "Vampire of Bavaria" (バイエルンの吸血鬼, Baierun no Kyūketsuki), is a successful, reclusive paraplegic businessman who has strong influence on the European economy. Nearly blind, Schuwald employs several students from LMU Munich, to which he is donating his library, to read him Latin. He fathered a son with a prostitute named Margot Langer. Although it is believed he was there when Karl was born, for some reason he abandoned mother and son. While his library-dedication ceremony is targeted by Johan in a scheme to unleash terror and pandemonium, the authorities (including Inspector Lunge) believe Schuwald is the real target and Tenma is responsible. Before Tenma leaves for Prague, he has Karl deliver a message to Schuwald about the mother of the Liebert twins' living in Prague. Schuwald later undergoes therapy with Dr. Reichwein and hires Fritz Verdemann to defend Tenma when he is arrested. After the Ruhenheim Massacre at the end of the series, Schuwald is informed of Tenma's current status and wishes to see him again one day.

=== Margot Langer ===
Margot Langer Voiced by: Atsuko Tanaka (Japanese); Brigitte Burdine (English),

Fake Margot Langer Voiced by: Kazuko Yanaga (Japanese); Wendee Lee (English)

Margot Langer (マーゴット・ランガー, Māgotto Rangā) is a prostitute and mother of Hans Georg Schuwald's son, Karl Neumann. Her real name was Helenka Novakova (ヘレンカ・ノヴァコバー, Herenka Novakobā). When she and a friend illegally immigrated to Germany from Prague, her friend was caught. But Margot succeeded and worked as a high-class call girl who eventually became Schuwald's lover. Years after giving birth to Karl, she sends him away out of love so he will not be known as "the son of a whore". It is hinted that after her retirement, she lived with Johan in friendship telling him of her past and his mother. However, it is also hinted that Johan kills Margot. Blue Sophie, who later posed as Margot, is also later killed by Johan and Roberto. It is later revealed that her old friend mothered the Liebert twins.

=== Karl Neumann ===
Voiced by: Tomokazu Seki (Japanese); Yuri Lowenthal (English)

Karl Neumann (カール・ノイマン, Kāru Noiman) is a student at LMU Munich and the son of Schuwald and Langer (who sent him away for a better life). Karl spent much of his childhood in foster care, until the Neumanns adopted him; he is shown to love and care for them as his parents. Neumann tries to get close to Schuwald without letting him know that he is his son. He is also involved in the mystery of a dead student, and the disappearance of Johan Liebert after his father's book collection is destroyed in an inferno during a ceremony at the university library. After reconciling with his father, he remains as Schuwald's personal assistant. He later confronts Inspector Lunge and shows him a picture of Johan. Under orders from his father, he encounters Tenma at the train station and reveals that the twins' mother lives in Prague. When Tenma is arrested Schuwald has Karl hire Fritz Verdemann to represent him, and Neumann is present when Nina returns for therapy with Dr. Gillen. At the end of the series, Karl tells his father about Tenma's whereabouts after the Ruhenheim Massacre. It is revealed in Another Monster that he has taken Schuwald's last name and lives happily with him, he is facing challenges to his paternity as Schuwald's son.

=== Lotte Frank ===
Voiced by: Kyoko Hikami (Japanese); Julie Ann Taylor (English)

Lotte Frank (ロッテ・フランク, Rotte Furanku) is a student at LMU Munich who is trying to win Karl Neumann's heart, so she aids his investigation of his father and late mother. When Karl rejects (and unintentionally humiliates) her by getting a proxy to go on a date with her, she is crushed and is comforted by Nina; they become fast friends. Lotte also wants to know about the mysteries behind Johan Liebert and the death of the student who worked with them for Schuwald. Lotte and Karl are seen together, when Anna briefly returns to visit the others and drop off Dieter with Dr. Reichwein. It is unknown whether she and Karl are a couple, but they are apparently friends.

=== Dr. Reichwein ===
Voiced by: Ichirō Nagai (Japanese); Paul St. Peter (English)

Julius Reichwein (ユーリウス・ライヒワイン, Yūriusu Raihiwain) is a psychologist who specializes in counseling and assisting recovering alcoholics. He is caught up in the mystery surrounding the "Monster" after one of his patients (Richard Brown) dies allegedly in a drunken accident while investigating Johan Liebert. He later becomes guardian to Dieter (helping Tenma and defending his character) and provides psychological care to Nina, Eva and others.

=== Richard Brown ===
Voiced by: Hiroshi Arikawa (Japanese); Cam Clarke (English)

Richard Brown (リヒァルト・ブラウン, Rihyarudo Buraun) is a private investigator hired by Schuwald to investigate the (apparent) suicide of Edmund Farren. Formerly with the Munich Police Department, Richard leaves the force after drunkenly killing an underage suspect. Shortly after, his wife and daughter leave him due to his alcoholism. He is seeing Dr. Reichwein to overcome his addiction, is piecing his life back together and has partially reconciled with his family. During his investigation into Farren's suicide, Brown becomes suspicious of Johan Liebert. He begins looking into the young man's past, and notices a connection to several of his previous cases. Aware of the detective's suspicion, Johan confronts Brown and leads him to a rooftop whilst discussing the incident which led to his dismissal from the police. Johan then claims that Brown was not drunk when he shot the suspect, but convinced himself that he was due to guilt. He then offers him a drink. Brown is later found dead after falling from the roof with a smashed whiskey bottle. The police rule it was either suicide or accident. However, Dr. Reichwein is convinced that he was murdered as Richard refused to drink any alcohol except genuine Scotch.

=== Wolfgang Grimmer ===
Voiced by: Hideyuki Tanaka (Japanese); Patrick Seitz (English)

Wolfgang Grimmer (ヴォルフガング・グリマー, Vorufugangu Gurimā) is a freelance journalist researching 511 Kinderheim, who is drawn into the search for Johan when he helps Tenma. Nearly always smiling, he is an apparently friendly, polite man who is good with children. However he seems to have a dark side; a former subject in 511 Kinderheim, he has developed another personality: an aggressive fighter who protects him when he is under stress, whom he calls "Magnificent Steiner" (超人シュタイナー), after a television show he watched as a child. Due to his training as a spy after his time in 511 Kinderheim, he admits he is not good at expressing emotion. Grimmer mentions to Tenma that he had been married and had a son. One day, his son suddenly stopped breathing; although he tried to revive him, there was nothing he could do. When he attends his son's funeral, his wife is shocked and angry at his apparent lack of grief. However, he can finally show his feelings when a childhood friend nearly goes down the same road as Johan. Grimmer ends up in Ruhenheim under the alias of Mr. Neumeyer (ノイマイヤー), and encounters Inspector Lunge. When the Ruhenheim Massacre begins, Wolfgang threatens a supposedly paraplegic man who was selling guns. When Grimmer is mortally wounded it sets off his Magnificent Steiner side, which pummels the gunmen. Dying, he confides to Tenma that he gave in to his anger (raising the possibility that his alter ego was a psychological filter he used to justify his violent acts); he then dies in front of Tenma, Franz Bonaparta and Wim Gnaup.

=== Jan Suk ===
Voiced by: Hisayoshi Suganuma (Japanese); Michael Sinterniklaas (English)

Jan Suk (ジャンスク, Jan Suku) is a detective with the Prague police trying to solve the mystery involving the death of his superior detective Zeman. Zeman was investigating the death of a former headmaster at 511 Kinderheim, with Grimmer as a suspect, when Jan Suk discovered Zeman was working with the Czechoslovak secret police. When Chief Havrik, Chief Patera and Detective Janáček (who all had connections with the secret police) are mysteriously poisoned with candy given to one of the detectives by Johan Liebert (who was masquerading as Anna Liebert at the time), Jan Suk is under suspicion and his movements monitored. He confides in Anna Liebert (Johan masquerading as his sister), a blonde woman he meets at a bar. Two detectives are killed by Johan in Suk's apartment. Suk obtains a tape made by the former headmaster of 511 Kinderheim and meets with Wolfgang Grimmer in an abandoned building, but is badly wounded by those seeking it. There are similarities between Tenma and Suk: both are young men with promise in their professions, caught in a web of events as a prime suspect. Grimmer later sends a note to the police claiming responsibility and exonerating Jan Suk from involvement in the police officers' deaths. He and Verdemann later team up to discover the truth about Franz Bonaparta. At the series' end, Jan Suk visits Grimmer's grave with Inspector Lunge and Fritz Verdemann.

=== Karel Lanke ===
Voiced by: Yoshisada Sakaguchi (Japanese); Peter Lurie (English)

Karel Lanke (カレル・ランケ, Kareru Ranke) is a former captain in the Czechoslovak secret police who wants to see Tenma and Grimmer. Grimmer requests an agreement to obtain Petrov's tape and research materials for an unknown party in Germany in return for Suk's safety. While they do not agree, Lanke mentions Franz Bonaparta (a picture-book author living in a mansion covered with red roses, who cared for the Liebert twins). When they confirm Suk's safety, Grimmer and Tenma agree to let Lanke only hear the tape. However, they discover the research materials gone; the tape has been recorded over by Johan Liebert with a message for Tenma. Inspector Lunge later visits Lanke for information about Franz Bonaparta.

=== Fritz Verdemann ===
Voiced by: Ryūsuke Ōbayashi (Japanese); Kyle Hebert (English)

Fritz Verdemann (フリッツ・バーデマン, Furittsu Bādeman) is a lawyer hired by residents of Düsseldorf after Tenma is arrested in Prague. Verdemann has made a name for himself as a defense attorney, defending his own father (who died in prison on suspicion on being a spy, before being exonerated). He is married, and during the series his wife gives birth to their daughter. Verdemann enjoys listening to "Over the Rainbow" from The Wizard of Oz. He is visited by Inspector Lunge, who is looking for a lead on Franz Bonaparta. Verdemann tells Tenma he did not know that Alfred Baul was Roberto in disguise, targeting Eva Heinemann. It is revealed later that Verdemann found notes written by his father, suggesting his guilt. He then teams up with Suk to learn the truth about Franz Bonaparta and his father's past. At the end of the series Verdemann, Jan Suk and Inspector Lunge visit Wolfgang Grimmer's grave. It is revealed in Another Monster that he has some of Grimmer's research notes on 511 Kinderheim and is looking for an Incredible Magnificent Steiner episode which Grimmer wanted to see. Verdemann is also Gunter Milch's lawyer in Another Monster, making him promise not to escape from prison again in exchange for Verdemann's exonerating him.

=== Gunter Milch ===
Voiced by: Shigeru Chiba (Japanese); Kirk Thornton (English)

Gunter Milch (ギュンター・ミルヒ, Gyuntā Miruhi) is a convict who, as a child, was kept in a cabinet while his parents were at work. During a life of crime, he was arrested and escaped 12 times.^{[ch. 106]} He meets Tenma, who was arrested in Prague and extradited, in the Düsseldorf police station during his most recent capture. When Milch mentions his next planned escape, Tenma decides to accompany him when Roberto (as Alfred Baul) tells Tenma that he is going to kill Eva.^{[ch. 109]} When Tenma and Milch are being transported to prison, Milch's partner Gustav is a decoy. The plan falters when Gustav announces his love and promises to go clean for his girlfriend Helene. Forgetting his job, he stands in the road and is hit by the paddy wagon.^{[ch. 111]} Grabbing Gustav's gun, Tenma forces the guards to release him and Milch. After taking Gustav to Eisler Memorial Hospital, Milch and Tenma part, with Milch planning to go to Tunisia.^{[ch. 112]} It is revealed in Another Monster that Milch was caught and imprisoned again, promising his lawyer Fritz Verdemann he will not escape if he can get him out.

=== Jaromir Lipski ===
Voiced by: Hiroaki Hirata (Japanese); Troy Baker (English)

Jaromir Lipski (ジャロミール・リプスキー, Jaromīru Ripusukī) is a down-and-out puppeteer in Prague, who meets Nina as she passes through the city in pursuit of Johan. Inspired by her, Lipski begins work on a new show with a new puppet resembling her. However, Lunge soon discovers he is the son of Franz Bonaparta. Lipski reveals that his father barred him from book-reading sessions at the Red Rose Mansion due to his "lack of talent". As time passes and Poppe has second thoughts about his work, he warms slightly towards his son. A postcard Poppe had sent him helps Lunge locate Ruhenheim. Tenma visits him and gets a lead on Franz Bonaparta, leading Tenma to Ruhenheim. Lipski's past is revealed in Another Monster; his mother was an actress in underground plays. Lipsky is happier, and his puppet shows are receiving more attention; he has also developed a relationship with a woman who likes his shows. Lipsky credits Nina, who showed him he could be happy.

=== Martin Reest ===
Voiced by: Shuuichi Ikeda (Japanese); Roger Craig Smith (English)

Martin Reest (マルティン・レースト, Marutin Rēsuto) was imprisoned for eight years for shooting his girlfriend and her lover. After prison, he works for The Baby. Martin hates to drink, because of his childhood with an alcoholic mother. While she never beat him, she exhausted him from trying to keep her out of bars. One night when she refused to come home with him, Martin (tired of her drunkness) left her on the streets alone and she froze to death. Peter Čapek recruited him to bring Eva Heinemann to Frankfurt and act as her bodyguard. Eva goes with him to avoid being killed by Roberto. In a bar, they exchange stories of their romantic lives. Eva tries to mold him into an exact image of Tenma. Martin meets Tenma at a diner and beats him up, telling him to forget about Eva. Later that night, Tenma pulls a gun on Martin, who describes Eva pointing out Johan at one of Peter's parties so that Peter can introduce Kristoff Sievernich to Johan. Martin is later told by Peter to kill Eva, but he does not. Instead he asks Eva to run away with him. He later meets Sievernich, who somehow learned that Martin left his mother to die and that his girlfriend begged Martin to shoot her, but he left; as he did, he heard a gunshot and came back to find that she had committed suicide. Angered over her death, Martin killed her ex-boyfriend but never told the police that she shot herself. Martin later warns Eva of an attempt on her life and allows her to escape with plans to meet up later. He is shot in the stomach during the gunfight by a team sent by Peter Čapek to kill Eva. Martin's friend brings him to see Tenma so that he could tell him about Peter, the continuing experiments, and his encounter with Kristoff before dying.

=== Peter Čapek ===
Voiced by: Nobuo Tanaka (Japanese); Dave Mallow (English)

Peter Čapek (ペトル・チャペック, Petoru Chapekku) is the last individual in the organization: a bespectacled, white-haired, mysterious man responsible for many incidents in Monster. He is highest-ranked in the organization, and tries to control "the devil" by letting him meet Kristoff Sievernich. In his youth, Čapek was Franz Bonaparta's apprentice and participated in the experiment on the Liebert twins. When Čapek arrived in Frankfurt, he started reading to children, but they changed, becoming suicidal and violent. Čapek was an old friend of the dentist, Milan Kolasch, who blames Peter for the riots which killed his loved ones. Čapek thinks everything is going well, but Johan tells him clearly later that everything is going the right way according to Johan's own plan. Kolasch tried to assassinate Peter at a convention, but was shot by police. Čapek was shocked at Kolasch's actions. After the death of "The Baby", he pretends everything is under control when he clearly knows things are going wrong. In his paranoia, when being driven to his villa Čapek kills his bodyguard when he thinks the guard is trying to kill him; he was actually reaching for his lighter. Čapek later had Nina brought where Johan was waiting for them. After Tenma prevented Nina's suicide, Čapek sees Tenma, telling him he is pursuing Franz Bonaparta. When Čapek's other bodyguards discover he killed their partner, he is shot in the head by one them while wondering what he and Franz were trying to create.

=== Kristoff Sievernich ===
Voiced by: Masashi Hironaka (Japanese); Travis Willingham (English)

Kristoff Sievernich (クリストフ・ジーヴァーニッヒ, Kurisutofu Jīvānihhi) is Johan's disciple and another survivor of 511 Kinderheim; he was bought by the Sievernich family from child traffickers. Son of a politician, he is spoiled. He and Johan agree to reunite 10 years after escaping the orphanage; they are introduced at a party by Eva Heinemann (who was hired to point Johan out). His late stepfather was one of four individuals in a neo-Nazi organization, and Sievernich was likely to succeed him. He has qualities similar to Johan's, intimidating Eva Heinemann's bodyguard Martin by reminding him of what happened to his mother and wife. Like Johan, Sievernich seems calm and jovial in front of others but is known for his "creepy" smile when speaking of death and the truth. He has a knack for discovering secrets, and can read people well. Nothing else is known about Sievernich, except that Johan or the organization tried to make him a second monster. Like Johan, he seems charismatic and friendly. However, his attitude can quickly change when someone threatens his plans. When Eva sees Sievernich, she fires a warning shot at his ear. He flies into a homicidal rage, accusing her of ruining his face and promising revenge when he rules the world. Shot in the leg by Tenma, he is dropped off at the nearest hospital after Tenma learns Johan's whereabouts.

=== Franz Bonaparta ===
Voiced by: Nachi Nozawa (Japanese); Michael McConnohie (English)

Franz Bonaparta (フランツ・ボナパルタ, Furantsu Bonaparuta) is the man responsible for the eugenics experiment leading to the birth of the Liebert twins, and author of the storybooks used to indoctrinate the children of the Red Rose Mansion; notably The Nameless Monster, from which Johan took his name and his mode of operation. His stories are full of metaphor and symbolism, often with monsters as important characters. Most also promote the idea that human nature contains the ability to become good or evil, although his works tend to denounce humanity rather than uplift it. He is the father of Jaromir Lipski, who received a postcard from him that later directs Inspector Lunge to Ruhenheim, where Franz runs the Hotel Versteck. Bonaparta is probably responsible for the death of the twins' father, as their mother strongly believes he is. He is shown (in flashbacks) to spend much time drawing her, although she despises him; vowing she would never forgive him, and when she died her children would avenge her. Bonaparta reveals his identity to Lunge and Grimmer after Grimmer threatens a supposedly paraplegic man who facilitated the Ruhenheim Massacre by giving out guns. Bonaparta repents for his actions after seeing Grimmer's death. He tells Tenma he had fallen in love with the twins' mother at first sight, also confessing that he killed anyone who knew of the existence of her and the twins.^{[ch. 156]} Bonaparta admits his guilt for creating the monster that is Johan and tries to kill him but is, instead, killed by a dying Roberto in front of Tenma.^{[ch. 158, 159]} His real name is Klaus Poppe (クラウス・ポッペ, Kurausu Poppe).^{[ch. 148]} As the author of children's books, he used the pen names Emil Scherbe (エミル・シェーベ, Emiru Shēbe), Jakub Farobek (ヤコブ・ファロベック, Yakobu Farobekku) and Helmuth Voss (ヘルムート・フォス, Herumūto Fosu), in addition to his real name.^{[ch. 116, 149]}

=== Wim Gnaup ===
Voiced by: Akiko Yajima (Japanese); Colleen O'Shaughnessey (English)

Wim Gnaup (ヴィム・クナウプ) lives in Ruhenheim and works at a hotel owned by Franz Bonaparta. He is abused by his drunk father Herbert and bullied by three children for his old bicycle as they call him "trash." When the three bullies steal Wim's bike, they tell him that it is in the "vampire's house" on the hill. When he enters the house, he meets Inspector Lunge and Wolfgang Grimmer (who tells hims where his bike is). Wim is later beaten by the bullies, who steal the money for his father's liquor. After they leave he is approached by an elderly couple, who ask if he would like to avenge them and offer him a gun. After another bullying episode, Wim is tempted to use the gun he received when the Ruhenheim Massacre begins. When Grimmer finds Wim where the bullies are now dead, he sees that Wim never used his gun and learns from Wim that he doesn't know who killed them. This is mentioned to Franz Bonaparta, who tells Wim he did the right thing not to use the gun. When Nina and Dr. Gillen arrive, Wim recognizes Nina from the drawings of her and Johan in the "vampire's house" on the hill. Wim tells Bonaparta about Nina's appearance when Johan arrives, and sees the wounded Roberto shoot Bonaparta before the latter can kill Johan. Johan later threatens Wim against Tenma, only to be shot by Wim's father. When Herbert is taken away by the authorities for questioning, Wim says that his father was protecting him. He is comforted by Nina and Dr. Gillen.

=== Herbert Gnaup ===
Voiced by: Eiji Hanawa (Japanese); Doug Erholtz (English)

Herbert Gnaup (ヘルベルト・クナウプ) is an unemployed alcoholic who is the town drunk and the neglectful father of Wim. His drunkenness drove his wife to leave him and their son and he is mocked by the people of Ruhenheim. Because of his laziness, he forces Wim to run errands for him and abuses him. Like his son, Herbert is approached by the elderly couple and given a gun. During the Ruhenheim Massacre, he plans to avenge himself on the patrons of a local pub who often insulted him by killing them only to find everyone inside already dead. As the massacre continues, Herbert looks for his son and begins to lose his grip on reality. When he sees Johan threatening Wim, Herbert hallucinates and sees a monster in Johan's place. Panic-stricken, he shoots Johan in the head. When the police arrive, Herbert is taken away for questioning.

=== Věra Černá ===
Voiced by: Gara Takashima, Houko Kuwashima (young) (Japanese); Lauren Landa (English)

Věra Černá is the mother of Johan and Anna/Nina, and a friend of Margot Langer. Her children were created as part of an experiment by Franz Bonaparta. She studied genetic engineering at Mendel University.^{[ch. 140, 161]} Unbeknownst to her, a member of the military was ordered to have children with her. But after actually falling in love, he told her the truth and they tried to run away together.^{[ch. 140]} However, they were stopped and she was held against her will until giving birth, while the father was presumably killed.^{[ch. 140]} At the end of the series, it is revealed that she is still alive and has been frequently visited by Tenma in Southern France.^{[ch. 161]} Based on their conversation, she still holds a grudge on Bonaparta for murdering her lover. It seems she is still haunted by the events. Her real name was revealed by a friend of hers in Another Monster.
