= Ingrid Fuzjko Hemming =

Swedish musician (1932–2024)

Ingrid Fujiko (also Fuzjko) von Georgii-Hemming (a.k.a. Fujiko Hemming) (イングリット・フジコ・ヘミング; Japanese name: Ohtsuki Fujiko (大月フジコ)) (5 December 1932 – 21 April 2024) was a classical pianist.

== Biography ==
Born in Berlin, Germany to a Japanese mother, Toako Ohtsuki, a piano teacher and a Swedish father, Fritz Gösta Georgii-Hemming (1910–1986), an architect and cartoonist educated at the Bauhaus. His father, Fritz Georgii-Hemming (1886–1959), was a lawyer (including at the Svea Court of Appeal) and civil servant, appointed a knight of the Order of Vasa. The family name derives from the marriage of Hans Hemming (1853–1927), a provincial doctor and Anna Sofia Georgii (1850–1888).

Shortly after her family had settled at Shibuya the relationship of Hemming's parents deteriorated into domestic violence ending in a divorce. Hemming was educated in Japan and began learning to play the piano at a young age from her mother. She was identified as a child prodigy and performed her first concert at seventeen.

Hemming went to Aoyama Gakuin Senior High School, Aoyama Gakuin Junior High School, Aoyama Gakuin Elementary School. She graduated from the Tokyo National University of Fine Arts and Music and began her professional career immediately. Hemming received many prestigious honors during this time, including the NHK-Mainichi Music Concour and the Bunka Radio Broadcasting Company Music Prize. She relocated to Germany at the age of 28 to study at the Berlin Institute of Music.

During a concert in Vienna in 1971, Hemming lost her hearing from a bout of high fever. She relocated again to Stockholm, Sweden to take advantage of its medical facilities. She performed many more concerts throughout continental Europe before returning to Japan in 1995.

A documentary that aired in 1999 raised public interest in her music. Her subsequent debut CD, La Campanella, sold over two million copies.

Hemming performed at Carnegie Hall in New York in June 2001.

Hemming died on 21 April 2024, at the age of 91.

== Recordings ==
In 2008, Hemming was signed by Domo Records for the world. In June 2009, Domo Records released five titles from her catalogue in the United States, including "Echoes Of Eternity"; "La Campanella"; "Nocturnes Of Melancholy", Live At Carnegie Hall and Liszt's "Piano Concerto No.1".

Four of her CDs have received the Classical Album of the Year award at the Japan Gold Disc Awards.

- Ingrid Fujiko Hemming - The Piano Works Decca 2009
- download single works from Fujiko Hemming
