= Lupin the 3rd vs. Cat's Eye =

2023 Japanese original net animation by Kōbun Shizuno and Hiroyuki Seshita

- Release poster

Japanese name
- Kana: ルパン三世 VS キャッツ・アイ
Transcriptions
- Revised Hepburn: Rupan Sansei bāsasu Kyattsu Ai
- Directed by: Kōbun Shizuno; Hiroyuki Seshita
- Screenplay by: Shuji Kuzuhara
- Based on: Lupin the 3rd; by Monkey Punch; and Cat's Eye; by Tsukasa Hojo
- Produced by: Takuya Yasue; Takahiro Koda
- Starring: Kanichi Kurita; Akio Otsuka; Daisuke Namikawa; Miyuki Sawashiro; Koichi Yamadera; Keiko Toda; Rika Fukami; Chika Sakamoto; Mugihito; Banjō Ginga; Hiroki Tōchi; Takayuki Sugō
- Music by: Yuji Ohno; Kazuo Otani; fox capture plan
- Production company: TMS Entertainment
- Distributed by: Amazon Prime Video
- Release date: January 27, 2023
- Running time: 92 minutes
- Country: Japan
- Language: Japanese

Lupin the 3rd vs. Cat's Eye (Japanese: ルパン三世 VS キャッツ・アイ, Hepburn: Rupan Sansei bāsasu Kyattsu Ai) is a 2023 Japanese original net animation (ONA) film directed by Kōbun Shizuno and Hiroyuki Seshita from a screenplay by Shuji Kuzuhara which serves as a crossover between the Lupin the Third franchise, itself based on the manga of the same name by Monkey Punch, and the Cat's Eye manga by Tsukasa Hojo. Produced by TMS Entertainment, the film serves as the twelfth Lupin the 3rd film and the third to be a crossover, after 2013's Lupin the 3rd vs. Detective Conan: The Movie, and stars the franchise's regular voice cast as well as the remaining cast members of TMS' 1983–1985 Cat's Eye anime reprising their roles. The film was released on Amazon Prime Video on January 27, 2023.

== Cast ==
Character	Japanese voice actor	English dub actor
Lupin the 3rd	Kanichi Kurita	Tony Oliver
Daisuke Jigen	Akio Otsuka (Note: Lupin the 3rd vs. Cat's Eye marks the first Lupin the 3rd film to not feature Kiyoshi Kobayashi as the voice of Daisuke Jigen following his departure from the role in 2021 and his death the following year.)	Richard Epcar
Goemon Ishikawa	Daisuke Namikawa	Lex Lang
Fujiko Mine	Miyuki Sawashiro	Michelle Ruff
Inspector Zenigata	Kōichi Yamadera	Doug Erholtz
Hitomi Kisugi	Keiko Toda	Alicyn Packard
Rui Kisugi	Rika Fukami (Note: Fukami replaces Toshiko Fujita as Rui due to her death in 2018.)	Cristina Valenzuela
Ai Kisugi	Chika Sakamoto	Deneen Melody
Toshi Utsumi	Yoshito Yasuhara	Ryan Colt Levy
Sadatsugu Nagaishi	Mugihito (Note: Mugihito replaces Tamio Ohki as Sadatsugu due to his death in 2017.)	
Heinrich Berger	Banjō Ginga (fake voice); Takayuki Sugō (real voice)	Tom Choi
Dennis Kirchmann	Hiroki Tōchi	Keith Silverstein
Michael Heinz	Banjo Ginga	Sean Burgos

== Production ==
The film was announced on September 21, 2022, with its initial crew as well as the confirmation of Kanichi Kurita and Keiko Toda reprising as Lupin and Hitomi respectively being revealed that same day. The film marks the 50th anniversary of the animated adaptations of Lupin the 3rd and the 40th anniversary of the Cat's Eye manga. The film is set in the 1980s period that Cat's Eye is set in with Lupin wearing his pink jacket from Lupin the 3rd Part III. On December 6th of that year, the rest of the cast was revealed, including Akio Otsuka's first performance as Daisuke Jigen in a Lupin the 3rd film as well as Rika Fukami (replacing Toshiko Fujita) as Rui Kisugi and Mugihito (replacing Tamio Ohki) as Sadagatsu Nagaishi.

== Music ==
Instrumental band fox capture plan performed the opening theme as well as renditions of Kazuo Otani's score for the Cat's Eye anime. Most of Yuji Ohno's score is taken from past Lupin the 3rd media such as The First, Part 6, Part 5 and Part IV. Anri returned to perform a new rendition of the Cat's Eye anime's first theme song for the film's end credits.

== Release ==
The film was released on Prime Video on January 27, 2023, marking the first anime film to receive a global simultaneous release for the platform. A screening for the film was held on January 25th of that year with co-director Seshita as well as voice actors Kurita and Toda being in attendance.

=== Home media release ===
The film was released on Blu-ray and DVD in Japan on March 13, 2024, by VAP. It was announced on January 6, 2026, that Discotek Media will release the film on Blu-ray in North America.
