= Lupin the IIIrd the Movie: The Immortal Bloodline =

2025 animated film directed by Takeshi Koike

- Theatrical release poster

Japanese name
- Kana: LUPIN THE IIIRD THE MOVIE 不死身の血族
Transcriptions
- Revised Hepburn: Lupin the IIIRD The Movie: Fujimi no Ketsuzoku
- Directed by: Takeshi Koike
- Screenplay by: Yūya Takahashi
- Based on: Lupin the 3rd by Monkey Punch
- Starring: Kanichi Kurita; Akio Ōtsuka; Daisuke Namikawa; Miyuki Sawashiro; Koichi Yamadera; Kataoka Ainosuke VI; Aoi Morikawa
- Music by: James Shimoji
- Production companies: Telecom Animation Film (animation); TMS Entertainment (production)
- Distributed by: Toho Next
- Release date: June 27, 2025 (Japan)
- Running time: 93 minutes
- Country: Japan
- Language: Japanese
- Box office: $1.18 million

Lupin the IIIrd the Movie: The Immortal Bloodline (Note: Japanese: LUPIN THE IIIRD THE MOVIE 不死身の血族, Hepburn: Lupin the IIIRD The Movie: Fujimi no Ketsuzoku) is a 2025 Japanese animated film directed by Takeshi Koike from a screenplay by Yūya Takahashi, based on the Lupin III manga series by Monkey Punch, serving as the thirteenth Lupin the Third film and the final entry in the Lupin the IIIrd saga. It reuses plot elements from the very first movie, The Mystery of Mamo, of which it serves as a prequel.

Produced by TMS Entertainment and animated by Telecom Animation Film, the film was released in Japan by Toho Next on June 27, 2025. GKIDS released it in North America on January 4, 2026. The film was released on DVD & Blu-ray in Japan on March 25, 2026 and digitally in the US and Canada on March 23.

== Plot ==
While returning home, gentleman thief Arsène Lupin III's hideout is attacked, and his vast collection of treasures is destroyed. Amid the wreckage, Lupin discovers a strange clue left behind by the attackers: a torn fragment of a map bearing the coordinates of an uncharted island. Intrigued and eager for answers, Lupin assembles his companions — his sharpshooting partner Daisuke Jigen, the samurai Goemon Ishikawa XIII, and the femme fatale Fujiko Mine — and secures a plane to investigate the island marked on the map.

Their journey is quickly interrupted by Lupin's relentless pursuer, Interpol Inspector Koichi Zenigata, who gives chase. During a brief scuffle, their planes are ambushed and shot down by Yael Okuzaki, a professional assassin with a personal history tied to Jigen. (Note: As depicted in Jigen's Gravestone) Both aircraft are forced into crash landings, scattering Lupin, Jigen, Goemon, Fujiko, and Zenigata across different regions of the mysterious island. As each struggles to survive and regroup, Lupin, Jigen, and Goemon are independently attacked by deadly assassins engineered through genetic modification. Meanwhile, Jigen comes face to face with Okuzaki, and the two former adversaries engage in a gunfight.

Lupin eventually infiltrates the stronghold of the island's ruler, an immortal being named Muom. It is revealed that Muom was created from the blood of another immortal entity, and has evolved over thousands of years, manipulating major historical events from behind the scenes. Accompanied by his interpreter Salifa, Muom explains that he has been orchestrating the attacks on Lupin and his allies. (Note: As depicted in Jigen's Gravestone, Goemon's Bloodspray, Fujiko's Lie, and Zenigata and the Two Lupins) He also reveals that the dense fog enveloping the island is toxic and will kill all outsiders within twenty-four hours unless they escape. Lupin attempts to kill Muom by shooting him in the head, only to witness the creature regenerate instantly. It is revealed in a flashback that Muom was a simple monkey who was given blood by a small man. The blood not only healed the monkey, but it caused the creature to gain incredible intelligence.

Elsewhere, Fujiko is captured by the island's inhabitants and prepared for a ritual sacrifice, but Goemon intervenes and rescues her. Their escape is halted by Hawk, a powerful enemy from Goemon's past, (Note: As depicted in Goemon's Bloodspray) brought back to life by the island. Before their duel can resume, Muom appears, effortlessly killing Hawk, and swiftly overpowering Goemon as well.

Lupin briefly reunites with his crew and urges them to focus on escaping the island while he confronts Muom alone. He asks Jigen for one last cigarette, but Jigen hands him the entire pack instead, telling him to return it later. The group reaches the shoreline, only to be blocked by a massive tsunami. At the same time, Lupin lures Muom into a massive explosion. Though enraged and injured, Muom regenerates once more, his furious screams triggering the eruption of the island's volcano. Lupin races toward the volcano's summit with Zenigata in pursuit. Upon reaching the top, Lupin begins to succumb to hallucinations caused by the poisonous fog and appears to fall into the volcano. Believing him dead, Zenigata is left behind as chaos consumes the island.

Muom then attacks the battleship carrying Jigen, Goemon, Fujiko; Zenigata arrives to inform them of Lupin's death, but the others are confident he's still alive. Fujiko soon escapes, while Jigen, Goemon, and Zenigata, aided by Okuzaki, make a final stand against Muom. Each is defeated in turn, and Muom prepares to kill Jigen, only to suddenly freeze in place. It is revealed that Lupin survived and deliberately leapt into the volcano, realizing it would lead him to the island's core. He deduced that Muom had become the island itself, sustained by rivers of blood flowing through it. By severing this "circulatory system", Lupin fatally weakens both Muom and the island before being swept away by the blood red water.

As the island begins to collapse, Fujiko follows another Salifa into Muom's lair, where she learns that Salifa is merely one of many clones created by the true mastermind, Mamo. Fujiko demands to be taken to the traveler who saved Muom, Mamo, and enters through a golden passageway. Jigen and Goemon escape in a stolen plane, while Zenigata survives using a life raft. Before the island can fully disintegrate, Mamo eradicates it entirely, erasing all evidence of its existence. Thirty minutes earlier, it is revealed that Lupin had already infiltrated Muom's lair once more, destroying all records of himself and his lineage, declaring "life is fiction, enjoy it."

In a post-credits scene, Jigen, Goemon, Fujiko, and Zenigata gather at Lupin's grave, only to see it's destroyed. Jigen discovers his missing cigarettes returned, while Zenigata is informed that Lupin has supposedly been arrested, (Note: As depicted in The Mystery of Mamo) indicating to everyone that he is still alive, and that the story of Lupin III is not over.

== Cast ==
Character	Japanese	English
Lupin III	Kanichi Kurita	Keith Silverstein
Daisuke Jigen	Akio Otsuka	Dan Woren
Goemon Ishikawa	Daisuke Namikawa	Lex Lang
Fujiko Mine	Miyuki Sawashiro	Cristina Vee
Inspector Zenigata	Kōichi Yamadera	Richard Epcar
Muom	Kataoka Ainosuke VI	Bill Russell
Salifa	Aoi Morikawa	Kelsey Jaffer
Yael Okuzaki	Takaya Hashi	Blythe Melin
Hawk	Akio Hirose	Ron Allen
Mamo	Kanji Obana	Michael Orenstein
Luuo	Mogura Suzuki	Rafael Ferrer
Fuua	Katamari Mizukawa	Lukas Arnold

== Production ==
The film alongside its staff was announced on November 29, 2024. The film is the first traditionally-animated solo Lupin the Third film in 30 years since 1996's Dead or Alive and is a completely original work, set in Koike's Lupin the IIIrd universe. The film's full title and its release date was announced on April 4, 2025. GKIDS licensed the film in North America and released it in cinemas from January 4-6, 2026.

=== Prequel ===
A prequel to the film, titled Lupin the IIIrd: Zenigata and the Two Lupins (LUPIN THE IIIRD 銭形と2人のルパン, Lupin the IIIrd: Zenigata to Futari no Lupin) was released on various streaming services in Japan on June 20.

== Music ==
The film's theme song is titled "THE IIIRD Eye", performed by B'z.

== Reception ==
The film received generally positive reviews from critics.

In a positive review, Matthew Allan of The Rolling Tape found the film to be a fun adventure, despite not having seen any previous Lupin media, saying "I went in quite blind, but I still found The Immortal Bloodline to be a fun adventure, and Koike's passion for the franchise shines throughout."

Tito W. James of comicon.com felt "Immortal Bloodline is a heist film, spy thriller, globetrotting adventure, and sci-fi horror film all rolled into one. The action is top-notch; delivering shootouts, showdowns, and car-chases that put Hollywood to shame. Muom and his interpreter are great villains and strike the right balance between creepy and campy" but added "janky CGI fodder-enemies add a noticeable blemish on such a great-looking film"

Reviewing for But Why Tho?, LaNeysha Campbell writes "Lupin III: The Immortal Bloodline is a visual treat that fittingly brings together the threads of Koike's other cinematic Lupin III films in an exciting penultimate culmination that spans a decade. Despite some shortcomings, the film is a thought-provoking exploration of themes such as trust, immortality, and what it means to truly live. The film's philosophical depth provides a more introspective look into Lupin's character, highlighting what makes him so endearing."

In another review, Robert Ewing of The People's Movies says "Lupin the IIIrd the Movie: The Immortal Bloodline is a bold yet ambivalent conclusion to Takeshi Koike's Lupin the IIIrd franchise, which began over eleven years ago. It features a thematically rich second half, stunning animation, and exhilarating action. However, it is held back by its B-movie narrative and problematic portrayal of its sole adult female character, Fujiko Mine. Ultimately, it results in a serviceable film that leaves you desiring more."

In a more negative review, Media.com reviewer DoctorKev praised the action sequences but felt the film was overall disjointed, and would offer little to nothing for viewers who hadn't seen the previous LUPIN THE IIIRD installments, concluding "[The Immortal Bloodline] is a deeply flawed film that's saved by some phenomenal action animation, but the plot is all over the place and full of holes only partially fillable with knowledge of the 1978 movie it's been designed to prequelise."
