= Lupin III: The First =

2019 animated film by Takashi Yamazaki

- Theatrical release poster

Japanese name
- Kana: ルパン三世 THE FIRST
Transcriptions
- Revised Hepburn: Rupan Sansei Za Fāsuto
- Directed by: Takashi Yamazaki
- Screenplay by: Takashi Yamazaki
- Based on: Lupin III by Monkey Punch
- Produced by: Shūji Abe; Kōji Nozaki; Naoaki Kitajima; Takeshi Itō; Ryota Kato
- Starring: Kanichi Kurita; Kiyoshi Kobayashi; Daisuke Namikawa; Miyuki Sawashiro; Kōichi Yamadera; Suzu Hirose; Kōtarō Yoshida; Tatsuya Fujiwara
- Cinematography: Yosuke Sakai
- Edited by: Tomokazu Takahashi
- Music by: Yuji Ohno
- Animation by: Toshiya Umeda
- Production companies: TMS Entertainment; Marza Animation Planet
- Distributed by: Toho
- Release dates: October 18, 2019 (Tokyo Midtown Hibiya); December 6, 2019 (Japan)
- Running time: 93 minutes
- Country: Japan
- Language: Japanese
- Box office: ¥1.16 billion ($11 million)

Lupin III: The First (Japanese: ルパン三世 THE FIRST, Hepburn: Rupan Sansei Za Fāsuto) is a 2019 Japanese animated heist comedy film based on the 1967–69 manga series Lupin III by Monkey Punch, to whom the film is dedicated. Written and directed by Takashi Yamazaki, it was produced by TMS Entertainment and Marza Animation Planet, and is the first fully computer-animated film in the franchise. The film stars Kanichi Kurita as Lupin III, Kiyoshi Kobayashi as gunman Daisuke Jigen, Daisuke Namikawa as samurai Goemon Ishikawa XIII, Miyuki Sawashiro as Fujiko Mine, and Kōichi Yamadera as Interpol detective Zenigata.

Set during the late 1960s of the Shōwa era, the film follows gentleman thief Arsène Lupin III and his crew to Paris and Brazil to find the whereabouts of the Bresson Diary, a treasure even Lupin's grandfather Arsène Lupin failed to catch. A battle for the mechanical diary is unleashed as a Nazi treasure-hunter group led by Lambert and Geralt are also in a race to steal it, with the prize that whoever deciphers its mystery will be the owners of an enormous fortune.

Lupin III: The First was theatrically released in Japan on December 6, 2019, by Toho. GKIDS released the film in North America on October 18, 2020. The film earned critical acclaim, with praise directed towards its plot, vocal performances, faithfulness towards the source material, and, in particular, the animation. Many felt the series transitioned well into CGI, praising the level of detail and fluidity.

== Plot ==
In German-occupied France, archaeologist Professor Bresson entrusts his heavily trapped diary and an amulet containing the key to the book to his family. The diary is purported to be the guide to the "Eclipse," a treasure which a group of Nazis working for Ahnenerbe is seeking. Bresson is killed by the arriving Germans; his family escapes, but is chased down by Ahnenerbe professor Lambert, and ends up in a car crash which only the infant daughter survives. Lambert steals the amulet, but cannot find the diary, which was lost during the chase.

In the 1960s, the diary resurfaces during a memorial exhibition in Bresson's honor. Lupin III tries to steal the book, as his grandfather had unsuccessfully attempted before him, only to be foiled first by a young woman disguised as a security guard, then by Fujiko; he is then arrested by Inspector Zenigata. En route to prison, Lupin is sprung by his friends Jigen and Goemon and sneaks into the home of the fake security guard, prospective archeology student Laetitia Lambert. He presents a medal identical to the one stolen by Lambert, which his grandfather left him. Laetitia contacts Lambert, her adoptive grandfather who ordered her to steal the book in the first place. Lambert tells her to bring Lupin and the amulet to him, in exchange for sending her to Boston University to study archeology.

Fujiko delivers the diary to Ahnenerbe fugitives looking for the Eclipse, among them Lambert and their leader Geralt. However, Geralt discovers Fujiko's duplicity and has her detained. Laetitia leads Lupin to Lambert's hideout, a customized transport plane, where they retrieve the book and the counterpart to Lupin's amulet. Lupin opens the diary, and the two learn that the Eclipse is a power generator left behind by an advanced lost civilization and is hidden in the ruins of Teotihuacan. Knowing Laetitia led him into a trap, Lupin willingly surrenders to Geralt and Lambert. Fujiko uses Lupin as a diversion to escape on her own. Lupin sneaks back into the plane and eavesdrops on Geralt and Lambert, learning that they are seeking Adolf Hitler, who reportedly faked his death and escaped to South America during the fall of Berlin, and now intends to use the Eclipse to resurrect the Third Reich.

When Laetitia, who also overheard the conversation, confronts the two men, Geralt throws her out of the plane. Snatching the diary and the amulets back, Lupin jumps after her, and he and Laetitia are rescued by Fujiko, Jigen and Goemon. Left stranded, Lupin goads Zenigata by radio to his location and steals his Interpol helicopter. Zenigata gets back on board, and after learning of the stakes, he teams up with Lupin's gang and Laetitia to thwart the villains. During a stopover, Lupin reveals to Laetitia that he deduced her to be Bresson's granddaughter and that Lambert adopted her only to get the diary and the Eclipse. He also discovers that his grandfather had actually helped Bresson find the Eclipse, but afterwards trapped the book to prevent the Eclipse from falling into the wrong hands.

Geralt and Lambert find the Eclipse's hiding place, but cannot proceed past its traps without the diary, forcing them to return to where they left Lupin. Exploiting their absence, Lupin's team makes it past the obstacles, but are then forced to discover that their enemies' retreat was merely a ruse to clear the path to the Eclipse. Lambert and Geralt activate the Eclipse, which carries them and Laetitia back to the surface, but Lupin's team intercepts them before they can escape, scuttling Lambert's plane. Lambert uses the Eclipse to get the plane to fly again, and activates a micro black hole to finish off Lupin's team; believing them dead, and drunk with power, he claims the device for himself and incinerates the diary. When he prepares to use the Eclipse to destroy Berlin, Geralt fights him; when Laetitia takes control of the device, Geralt shoots at her, but Lambert takes the bullet for her and dies. Geralt then receives the news that Hitler has been located and takes the Eclipse and Laetitia to him.

When Geralt arrives at the Ahnenerbe headquarters, he meets with Hitler and the two depart on the Eclipse to test its capabilities. Left behind, Laetitia discovers that Lupin's gang have beaten Geralt to the base with the help of Zenigata and Interpol, and Lupin has disguised himself as Hitler. On the Eclipse, Lupin reveals himself and Geralt attacks him, but Lupin tampers with the Eclipse controls to release a micro black hole inside the Eclipse. Geralt is sucked into the hole and perishes, while Lupin escapes with a gravity device he kept from the Teotihuacan ruins. After a good-bye to Laetitia – and gifting her with the gravity device and her enrollment into Boston – Lupin and his associates rush to escape Zenigata's attention.

== Voice cast ==
Character	Japanese	English
Lupin III	Kanichi Kurita	Tony Oliver
Daisuke Jigen	Kiyoshi Kobayashi	Richard Epcar
Goemon Ishikawa	Daisuke Namikawa	Lex Lang
Fujiko Mine	Miyuki Sawashiro	Michelle Ruff
Inspector Zenigata	Kōichi Yamadera	Doug Erholtz
Laetitia	Suzu Hirose	Laurie Hymes
Gerard	Tatsuya Fujiwara	Paul Guyet
Lambert	Kōtarō Yoshida	David Brimmer
Bresson	Kazuaki Ito	Marc Thompson
Adolf Hitler	Mitsuru Takakuwa	River Kanoff

== Production ==
=== Development ===
"This work was completed over a long period of time, supported by the words of Monkey Punch Sensei: '3DCG Lupin is my dream.' To express "Lupin" that everyone knows in 3DCG was a very happy and exciting job. Especially with regard to unique movements and facial expressions, I think that the production team's high technical ability and deep love for Lupin have made it attractive compared to overseas masterpieces. It would be great if not only fans but also people who have not touched the work so far can feel that "I like Lupin more" after watching the movie. I sincerely hope that this work "THE FIRST" will serve as a bridge to bring more Japanese stories to the world." — Producer Takeshi Ito (Marza Animation Planet)

The film was teased by Kiyoshi Kobayashi after the passing of Monkey Punch. Sega Sammy Holdings, the parent company of both TMS Entertainment and Marza Animation Planet also made a tweet later. On June 10, 2019, a Twitter account under the name @lupin_3rd_movie was created showing a poster of a 3D model of Lupin wearing Arsène Lupin's sword-scarred hat. With the tagline, "40 years from the immortal masterpiece The Castle of Cagliostro," it was revealed that Lupin III would debut as a 3D character for the first time. It had been twenty-three years since a Lupin feature film released in cinemas ever since Lupin III: Dead or Alive in 1996.

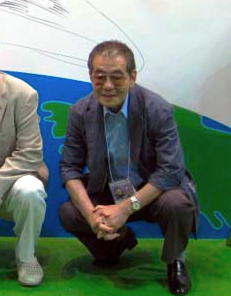
The film is dedicated to Lupin III creator Monkey Punch

Bringing the eponymous thief into the 3D format was one of Monkey Punch's most cherished goals. The film is dedicated to the memory of Monkey Punch, the creator of Lupin III, who died on April 11, 2019, before the movie was released. When Monkey Punch saw the preliminary results of the movie he stated, "I've been looking forward to a 3DCG Lupin III for a long time. I've taken a look at the characters and story: it looks like this Lupin will come packed with new sensations, and I'm getting excited just thinking about how the film will turn out."

Marza Animation Planet and TMS Entertainment were the animation studios producing the film. On June 10, 2019, the teaser for the movie was released with Lupin sporting the taglines "Well, let's get started" and "It's showtime!" The teaser features a montage of the history of Lupin's adaptations from traditional hand drawn animation to finally the 3D footage. The animation team decided Lupin will wear the red jacket (second anime (1977-1980)). Later on October 1, 2019, the official trailer and poster was released. On November 22, 2019, Toho released the opening title sequence of the film.

Takashi Yamazaki, one of Japan's leading film animation directors who previously worked for such projects as Dragon Quest: Your Story, wrote the script and directed the movie. Initially, the director was only writing the screenplay for the movie as a consultant for Marza. The studio was looking for a director and Yamazaki's interest in the film and the creativity warranted nomination for director. Yamazaki was entrusted the Lupin the Third franchise. The director noted: "I am really happy to be added to the end of this lineage in a new format called 3DCG." The film was intended to be a segue or a hook from 2D adaptations of the past to the 3D movie.

Marza Animation made over twelve screenplays and three story reels for the film. The storyboards were detailed with voice actor's voices acting as a reference point. At Marza each script was transferred to a storyboard reel that was critiqued. The weak parts were edited out. Despite the harsh criticism that was mentally grueling moments for the director, the screenplay process by Marza was intended to have a beneficial effect at the end, when the team finally were able to edit out and create a more efficient script.

Yamazaki in an interviews says the animators were really conscious of the way they drew Lupin. The intended effect was for the viewers and Monkey Punch himself to say they recognize Lupin. The intention was even though it's CG, Lupin will look like 2D Lupin. Previous animators who worked on Lupin were on the sets to verify all the characters were Lupin-like. The film was initially set to be shot Hollywood-style with the characters in a globetrotting adventure. However, the undertaking of such a task in Japan as opposed to Hollywood was noted to be a formidable task. Therefore, the film team went into the route of CGI that can also create an action film.

The creative team of the Lupin franchise from previous works resumed for this production. For the first time since the stories were serialized as a cartoon in 1967 and in animated television in 1971, the eponymous thief was animated into a 3D figure amidst CGI background. Naoaki Kitajima, producer for the movie stated the movie is a testament to the creative potential of the Japanese people. The animators from Toms Entertainment and Marza Animation Planet intended the movie to serve as a cultural bridge between the different nations of the world, with a story that will be understood by any audience. The script was noted by a review that "bounce from setpiece to setpiece" with comedy used as the primary vehicle of movement throughout the script.

The script features an adventure with Mesoamerican, Mesopotamian mythology, and Nazi intrigue. The movie was slated to be released in Japan on December 6, 2019, by Toho following a worldwide release schedule during December 16 in France, the birthplace of Lupin's grandfather.

The original cast that voiced the previous Lupin installments returned including the eponymous Lupin voiced by Kanichi Kurita. Miyuki Sawashiro voiced Fujiko Mine, Daisuke Namikawa voiced Goemon Ishikawa XIII, Kiyoshi Kobayashi voiced Daisuke Jigen and Kōichi Yamadera as Zenigata. New characters appear in the film including Suzu Hirose as Laetitia the heroine archaeologist, Kōtarō Yoshida as archaeologist Lambert, and Tatsuya Fujiwara as Geralt. GKIDS announced the English-dub voice cast that will feature the returning voices of Tony Oliver as Lupin III; Richard Epcar as Daisuke Jigen; Lex Lang as Goemon Ishikawa; Michelle Ruff as Fujiko Mine; Doug Erholtz as Koichi Zenigata; Laurie C. Hymes as Laetitia; David Brimmer as Lambert; and Paul Guyet as Geralt.

On October 18, 2019, the movie was presented at the Hibiya Cinema Festival at Tokyo Midtown Hibiya. On November 11, 2019, a preview was held at Toho Cinemas Roppongi Hills theater. On December 6, 2019, the movie debuted at Toho Cinemas in Hibiya, Tokyo where a stage greeting of cast was held that included Kiyoshi Kobayashi who previously voiced Daisuke Jigen. The success of the film spurred new distributions in North America. In March 2019 GKIDS who specializes in distributing Japanese classics to North America agreed to distribute the movie in 2020. COVID-19 delayed the launch of the movie in North America by several months. In September 2020, GKIDS officially released a statement that the film will launch in North America on October 18, 2020.

=== Themes ===
Of all the tones found in the Lupin franchise, director Yamazaki found the tone in The Castle of Cagliostro as the best portrayal for the 3D film. Yamazaki was profoundly moved by The Castle of Cagliostro ever since he saw the film on TV in the 1980s. The experience entrenched in himself the idea that Japan can make high-quality films. The moment influenced the direction for the current film. Therefore, the movie is constructed around the model of Cagliostro with many homages added. The ending's emotional climax is similar to the climax in Cagliostro. However, the director emphasized the film isn't a complete duplicate of the film, and has some different alterations to the "damsel-in-distress" character, with elements of drama added in.

The script did not veer far from the themes of the canon. The familiar traits of Lupin and the stories are presented, such as Lupin announcing his heists to the police before it is put into action. The script revolves around the treasure-hunting scheme, where the protagonists go off to different locales of the world, including Paris, Mexico, and Brazil to uncover the secret of the Bresson Diary. The atmosphere of the locales is intended to be evocative of the post-war French-Belgian era, especially found in the comic book series bandes dessinées.

French animators were present in the studio to help with the depiction of such sequences. The film was intended to be an ancestral historical flashback film, highlighted by the nostalgic segue into the times of grandfather Arsène Lupin, as Lupin tries to follow in his grandfather's footsteps in Paris. The theme of family reunion is also emphasized with side character Laetitia's story line. The character must also comprehend her own family's connection with the Bresson diary and ultimately the Ahnenerbe.

The film was noted by reviews for its theme of honor in thievery. Laetitia depicted as a student of archaeology is juxtaposed with Lupin as a thief. Laetitia would never think of stealing from history, unlike Lupin. A review stated, the film could have developed this potential juxtaposition even more. Another review found the depiction of Lupin as an honorable gentleman thief is exemplary and is a parallel to the theme in The Castle of Cagliostro. Yamazaki stated, the film's appeal is how a thief despite their reputation is depicted as a charismatic hero thief who helps out a girl who has no freedom. The help is featured when Lupin will pave the way for Laetitia to attend a school she always wished to enroll in.

The plot drew inspiration from real-world history such as the artifact in question being one of the primary targets for the Nazis during World War II. The creators of the film wanted to evoke realistic adventure thriller elements into the film without resorting to placing the setting in a fictitious setting. Therefore, the film has considerable 007 James Bond themes present. A Collider review stated Lupin is to Japan what Bond is to Britain. Interviews found parallels between the film and The Adventures of Tintin. Due to the fact that adaptation is in Lupin's culture, the Collider review highlighted the film's ability to reinvent new plots instead of duplicating the past materials.

The film was intended to be a highlight of the Japanese cinema industry during the new era of the Reiwa. However, the film will continue to depict the stories during the nostalgic Shōwa period with the use of technology in the film depicting airplanes used during World War II or the Fiat 500. The time was set in the later half of the 1960s. The film will use archaeological references within a heist, mystery genre.

The film depicted Lupin and his crew face off against Lambert, a researcher of a secret organization that later reveals to be the elite archaeological group of Germany- Ahnenerbe. The archaeological aspect is enlivened by the heroine Leticia as an archaeologist girl expert. The film explains how the logic of archaeology is used to decipher the mystery.

=== Marketing ===
British luxury apparel brand Dunhill launched a campaign in recognition of the release of the movie by featuring the key characters wearing Dunhill AW19 runway collection pieces. Lupin III wears pieces from the Walnut Dash capsule inspired by vintage British car interiors of the 1970s and 1980s; Jigen wears pinstripe suit with trilby hats inspired by English country dressing; and Goemon the samurai wears a kimono-style topcoat. Nippon Television hosted a telethon from November 29 featuring the TV adaptations of Lupin the 3rd.

Fiat had a special promotion with the Lupin team since one of the iconic car chases involve a Fiat 500. Darts company DARTSLIVE collaborated with the movie makers to distribute a limited edition Lupin-themed dartboard. Seafood specialty store Fukuya promoted the movie in their lineup of seafood brands. The DVD was released with the movie's clockwork motif of the Bresson Diary as the cover. The deluxe Blu-ray will include a special "Bresson Diary" type edition and a booklet of approximately 100 pages. French animation magazine Animascope, printed their first issue, featuring the character Lupin from the film, in its front cover.

=== Animation ===
The movie became one of the earliest examples of Japanese 3D CGI content, which is still at a development stage compared to the established and mainstream 2D anime industry. The director explained creating 3DCGI content from Japanese 2D animation is a sophisticated transition that needs to find the right medium. If the translation is done with intricate details, the output will look completely different from what is intended. The director however explained 3D animation still has potential in Japan.

There was increased attention whether Lupin can survive a CGI reboot from 2D. Yamasaki cleared the distinction between hand-drawn 2D and 3D in an interview. For the director, CG tends to see more action. The director agreed both media should be taken into account by the spirit of their drawing. The animation team used the concepts of 3D animation to create the illusion the film is drawn in traditional 2D animation.

In terms of animation in comparison to Hollywood and Japan animation industry, the laser chamber episode specifically is an example of where Japan excels in live-action shots reconstructed in 3DCG. The episode made the film one of the series' most prolific visual onscreen performances of Lupin that match the rooftop leap sequences in Cagliostro. Although the movie's new medium was appealing, some reviewers still were nostalgic for the 2D animation and its watercolor drawings.

The animation team workflow was noted for its efficient management and where budget was constrained such as during the lighting effects, they adapted with new techniques. Before the production, a test sequence was created such as the action sequences where Lupin competes for the treasure via parkour atop the rooftops of Paris or the drama scene in the heroine's room. By creating a test sequence in the same flow as the actual production, the producers can evaluate the quality before declaring the final image. The animation tried to incorporate the landscapes, the environment, culture, languages, and history of the 1960s in which the movie is set. Real-world elements were drawn including Nissin Cup Noodle brand when the Lupin and the crew are transporting a fugitive in a vehicle.

A car chase scene was presented with the famous Fiat 500 witnessing a comeback. This episode was a homage to the Castle of Caglistro. The Fiat finds itself in a police chase that also depicts vintage cars namely Japan-only Nissan Cedrics. The animation team presented the nimble capabilities of the small car in a chase. The 3D aspect of the chase was supplemented by sound of tire squeaking, braking sound, and running sound like an "acrobatic running style." The action sequences, such as the car chase and airplane dog fight were pre-made in 3D. Takaaki Kise was in charge for the production of those scenes.

The character development team unraveled an archive of Lupin statues from earlier productions to find the best representation for this film. ZBrush was then used to create three different 3D sculptures of Lupin, of which one was selected after a vote. The riggers were noted for their dedication in selecting the different expressions for the 3D figures. Facial expressions of the characters took considerable time in production that took around eight months. The animators presented the characters in CGI depiction without going into the further ends of photo realistic expressions. Motion-capture was considered as the final animation medium but full animation was chosen because it will present the world with sharpness to the artistry and general richness. The animators sought a delicate balance of comical cartoonish expressions and human-like movements.

The dimensions of the characters also were a challenge. Lupin's facial rig used mGear and Maya's SoftMod deformer. Animation started when a rough draft of a storyboard is drawn by hand. Then the episode is shot connecting it with music and dialogue with a final version completed as a story reel. The episode where the Eclipse, a climactic orb of energy spirals into the air was delicately drawn by veteran animator Kazuhide Tomonaga. Houdini was the animation tool used to convert that episode from 2D story board to 3D. Pre-visualization took many takes with the layers of smoke around the sphere adjusted by animator lighting supervisor Satoshi Tomatsu.

=== Soundtrack ===
On November 12, 2019, Yuji Ohno released the soundtrack of the movie with 61 songs. You & Explosion Band conducted the music while the theme song Gift was sung by guest vocalist Lyn Inaizumi and lyrics written by Yoshiki Mizuno. Ohno who has previously worked for many Lupin installments was asked to bring back the nostalgic Shōwa post-war era jazz compositions familiar in such theme songs as Fire Treasure (Honoo no Takaramono) in The Castle of Cagliostro. As a result, Gift was rendered that combined with the rest of the soundtrack to create a jazz score.

== Release ==
=== Theatrical ===
North American theatrical release poster

Philippines film distributor Pioneer Films (tg) revealed it will open Lupin III THE FIRST in the Philippines on January 29, 2020. Thai film distributor M Pictures agreed to distribute the movie on February 27, 2020, after releasing a Thai-dubbed trailer. In May 2020 the film released to the South Korean audience. The movie was released on May 15, 2020, in Spain. Sato Company will release the movie in Brazil in 2020. In Italy, during February 19, 2020, a special Yellow Carpet event commenced at The Space Odeon(it) in Milan. The event featured promotional events by Fiat as the Abarth 595 model was displayed. Anime Factory of Koch Media Italia agreed to release the movie on February 27, 2020. However COVID-19 temporarily halted any new releases in Italy. In September 2020, the film was released in Italy through VOD service. At the 2020 Annecy, the movie was presented in digital format. Although initially stated that the movie will be released in France on December 16, 2020, via Eurozoom (fr), the release date has been pushed back earlier to October 7, 2020, with promotional material featuring a new French poster. Mexico released the film on October 15, 2020.

GKIDS agreed to a theatrical release in North America in the latter months of 2020. On September 22, 2020, GKIDS released the teaser for the English dubbed release of Lupin III: The First. The film was confirmed to be run in select North American theaters from October 18, 2020. The subtitled version, featuring the original Japanese voice cast, arrived later on October 21, 2020. Fathom Events distributed the film to U.S. theaters on behalf of GKIDS.

=== Home media ===
The Blu-ray and DVD of the movie released in Japan on June 3, 2020. A deluxe Blu-ray edition was released with a cover in the style of the Bresson Diary. The edition included a 100-page Bresson Diary-style booklet. From GKIDS and Shout! Factory the winter DVD release commenced on December 15 as a Digital HD version. Following on January 12, 2021, the Blu-ray + DVD combo pack released. A steelbook edition of the Blu-ray combo was also manufactured, with an additional limited edition offer of a 18x24'' lithograph while supplies last. A limited release re-run of the film distributed by GKIDS ran on 29 and 31 August 2021.

== Reception ==
=== Critical response ===
On review aggregator Rotten Tomatoes, 95% of 22 critics have given the film a positive review, with an average score of 7/10. The site's critical consensus reads, "Featuring visually striking CGI animation of its famed characters, Lupin III:The First is a charming and old-fashioned adventure romp."

According to Pia movie ranking survey company from Japan, Lupin III: The First was ranked number one in movie satisfaction of all the releases on Friday, December 6 and Saturday, December 7, 2019. Japanese reviews were positive toward the film.

A review at Gizmodo Japan says: "Toho keeps the animation quality high in this work as well, and is a perfect blend of the stylistic beauty of the Lupin series and the clear and accurate visual that is one of the greatest advantages of CG." Cinematoday(ja) of Japan remarked the innovations from 2D animation adaptation is still present in this film: "In this work, the royal road style that incorporates elements such as bold actions, mystery solving, and the reversal that are the charm of the series is present. As for characters, while taking advantage of 3DCG such as three-dimensional action, the appeal of hand-drawn animation has been inherited for movement and facial expressions. As "THE FIRST", Lupin the 3rd: The First in its 3DCG animation commemorates the entry of a new era in the "Lupin" series."

Shiraishi of Real Sound (ja) explains the 3D was "realistic" and the "animation stands out." The review explains the nostalgic themes present in the Lupin franchise such as "big jumps from roof to roof, the car chase in the familiar yellow car" all evoke the old Lupin despite the transition from 2D to 3D: "the Lupin gang remains the same." The review also noted its references to media and geography such as, "A careful copy of Paris in the first half of the 1960s, the remnants of the Nazi Germany." Naoko Hosoda for Mantan reviewed the film has rare glimpses of Miyazaki's Lupin. The animation for the eyes were particularly noted for its clarity: "Lupin's eyes staring at Leticia are also gentle." In conclusion, the movie's action is at the scale of Hollywood by stating: "the action is truly 3DCG, and the speed and scale of the Hollywood movie are eye-catching." The Japan Times stated, "A scene of Lupin and Laetitia sparring on a Parisian rooftop is so delightful, I wish it had gone on for longer; ditto a skydiving sequence that suggests the director has been cribbing from Kathryn Bigelow's '90s surfer caper, Point Break."

Ungeek stated, "In fact, seeing the film feels like watching a movie-length classic Lupin III episode, in the best way possible!"

Italian reviews marveled at the cinema whose franchise has been broadcast in Italy since 1979. Cinematik stated the movie's title The First is apt because of many reasons: "First, it is the first feature film made in CG; also it is the first film without the great master Monkey Punch. Finally, in this new adventure our Lupin III will try to get his hands on the Diary of Bresson, the only treasure that the famous grandfather Arsenio Lupin (I) never managed to steal. An adventure to which the famous thief has often accustomed us, made up of deceptions, breathtaking escapes, ancient mysteries to be solved, science fiction inventions, and secret organizations of the Nazi mold." Madmass magazine with a four stars stated: "Lupin III – the First is technically superlative, an authentic enchantment for the eyes in which each sequence of frames appears a painting in bright colors. The emotional aspect is no less heart-pounding, spectacular and photorealistic action sequences, experienced both at full speed and in slow motion: in the middle of traffic, in the desert, or on board the yellow Fiat 500 of the Lupin gang."

Marco Tedesco of Il.Cineocchio marveled at the limitless plots that can be created from the world stating, "Even in such an indistinct setting, however, it is capable of giving birth to stories that can push the viewer to doubt what is possible in this world."

French review by Caroline at the Annecy International Animation Film Festival stated the charm of the characters is present because it is a right mixture of cartoonish and photorealistic characters: "Far from looking for hyper-realistic effects that would have made Lupin III and his band difficult to recognize, the animation has fun playing with the laws of physics and frees itself from the constraints of anatomy. We recognize him by his corner smile of course, but we find him especially in his fluid and elastic movements so characteristic, which are quite respected." Tasha Robinson's review for Polygon found many parallels to The Castle of Cagliostro and believed, "But while the newest film in the series may never replace Castle of Cagliostro, they make a fine double feature."

Matt Schley of IGN reviews stated "With the new visual style, the detailed textures of the film's vehicles, clothing and other objects practically pop off the screen. Rather than total realism, Yamazaki seems to be aiming for something more cartoon-like, and some of the best shots almost look like fluid claymation. Lupin has always been about gravity-defying leaps and bounds, and this animation style fits perfectly. When jumping around the screen, Lupin's body warps and stretches – not to the point where he loses all sense of weight, but just enough so he remains distinctly Lupin."

Variety review by Maggie Lee highlighted the movie stayed to its roots: "Setting this film in the early '60s not only plays to his strengths, but also preserves the ambience of the original in architectural, vehicular, and panoramic designs, emulating the intense and vibrant color schemes of post-war French-Belgian bandes dessinées." In terms of animation the review stated: "A grand entrance is staged in elegant, showstopping style, from chandelier gymnastics to a rooftop chase, all with breathless balletic grace that also reveals period Parisian cityscapes in romantic splendor." The final verdict was: "This lavish, technically polished animated caper featuring the beloved gentleman thief of Japanese manga delivers high-octane entertainment but plays safe with the canon."

=== Box office ===
It was released on December 6, 2019, in Japan, ranking #2 in its opening weekend grossing 307,395,900 yen (about US$2.82 million) only behind Frozen II. In the second week the film collected $5.45 million in ten days. By January 2020, the movie had earned 1 billion yen. The film has earned a cumulative total of 1.16 billion yen (~$11 million).

The US Blu-ray release of the film peaked at #3 on the Top Ten Blu-ray Sellers for Week Ending 1/16/21. Lupin III: The First sold 38% as many units as the #1 film on the list Tenet, along with a HD share of 96%.

== Accolades ==
Award	Date	Category	Name	Result
43rd Japan Academy Award	March 6, 2020	Animation of the Year	Lupin III: The First	Nominated
43rd Japan Academy Award	March 6, 2020	Excellent Animation Work	Lupin III: The First	Won
Annecy International Animation Festival	June 15, 2020	Feature Film	Lupin III: The First	Nominated
53rd Sitges Film Festival	October 17, 2020	Animation	Lupin III: The First	Nominated
Big Cartoon Festival	October 29, 2020	Full-Length Film	Lupin III: The First	Nominated
Hawaii Film Critics Society	January 2021	Best Animated Film	Takashi Yamazaki	Won
