= Lupin the 3rd Part IV: The Italian Adventure =

Japanese anime television series

- Promotional poster
- ルパン三世
- Genre: Adventure, comedy
- Based on: Lupin the 3rd by Monkey Punch
- Written by: Yūya Takahashi
- Directed by: Kazuhide Tomonaga (Chief director); Yūichirō Yano
- Music by: Yuji Ohno (Japanese version); Papik (International version)
- Country of origin: Japan
- Original language: Japanese
- No. of episodes: 26 (list of episodes)

Production
- Executive producer: Ryota Kato
- Producer: Yu Kiyozono
- Animator: Telecom Animation Film Co., Ltd.
- Production company: TMS Entertainment Co., Ltd.

Original release
- Network: Italia 1 (Italy)
- Release: August 30 – November 30, 2015
- Network: Nippon TV (Japan)
- Release: October 2, 2015 – March 18, 2016

Lupin the 3rd Part IV: The Italian Adventure, also known simply as Lupin the 3rd (Japanese: ルパン三世, Hepburn: Rupan Sansei) or Lupin the Third Part IV (Japanese: ルパン三世 PART IV, Hepburn: Rupan Sansei Pāto Fō), is a Japanese anime television series animated by Telecom Animation Film. Part of the Lupin III franchise, it is the fifth anime television adaptation of the Lupin III manga series created by Monkey Punch. The series aired from August to November 2015 on Italia 1 in Italy, and from October 2015 to March 2016 on Nippon Television and other channels in Japan. It started airing in the United States on Adult Swim's Toonami programming block in June 2017.

== Plot ==
Most of the story takes place in Italy and San Marino, although some episodes are partly set elsewhere (e.g., France, Japan), with Lupin wearing a blue jacket.

== Voice cast ==
Character	Japanese	English	Italian
Lupin III	Kanichi Kurita	Tony Oliver	Stefano Onofri
Daisuke Jigen	Kiyoshi Kobayashi	Richard Epcar	Alessandro D'Errico
Goemon Ishikawa XIII	Daisuke Namikawa	Lex Lang	Antonio Palumbo
Fujiko Mine	Miyuki Sawashiro	Michelle Ruff	Alessandra Korompay
Inspector Koichi Zenigata	Kōichi Yamadera	Doug Erholtz	Rodolfo Bianchi
Rebecca Rossellini	Yukiyo Fujii	Cassandra Lee Morris	Gaia Bolognesi
Justin Person (Agent Nyx)	Shunsuke Sakuya	Michael McConnohie	Fabrizio Pucci
Robson Zuccoli	Jin Yamanoi	Neil Kaplan	Guido Di Naccio
Kou Uraga	Eiji Hanawa	Michael Sinterniklaas	Andrea Lavagnino
Percival Gibbons	Shinshū Fuji	JB Blanc	Pierluigi Astore
Leonardo da Vinci	Kazuhiko Inoue	Jamieson K. Price	Marco Baroni

== Media ==
=== Manga ===
A manga adaptation by Naoya Hayakawa began publication on December 28, 2015. Titled Lupin the Third Italiano (ルパン三世 ITALIANO, Rupan Sansei Itariāno), four volumes have been published by Futabasha as of November 28, 2016.

=== Anime ===
The series received its world premiere in Italy on August 30, 2015, on the Italia 1 channel, and a preview screening at Concordia theater in San Marino on August 29, 2015. The Japanese premiere was on October 1, 2015, on NTV and the series was made available on the J:Com and Hulu Japan services on October 21. It ran for 26 episodes in Italy and 24 episodes in Japan. The main theme song for the Italian version of the series, "Lupin, un ladro in vacanza" (Lupin, a thief on holiday) is performed by Italian hip-hop singer Moreno featuring Giorgio Vanni. The main theme song for the Japanese version of the series "Theme from Lupin III 2015" is composed by Yuji Ohno and performed by You & The Explosion Band. The ending theme for the Japanese version of the series "I Won't Love You if You Don't Say It Right" (ちゃんと言わなきゃ愛さない, Chanto Iwanakya Aisanai) is performed by enka singer Sayuri Ishikawa and features lyrics written by Tsunku. It was released as a single with additional tracks in Japan on October 1, 2015. The series was released across DVD and Blu-ray releases by VAP in Japan between December 23, 2015, and July 20, 2016.

Crunchyroll began streaming the series as Lupin the Third - Part 4 on January 7, 2016. All episode previously broadcast in Japan were added at the same time. The series has been licensed by Anime Limited for the UK market and by Discotek Media for the North American market. The English dub, which was directed by Richard Epcar and Ellyn Stern, started airing in the United States on Adult Swim's Toonami programming block on June 18, 2017 and concluded on January 21, 2018. The dub, which was created as an adaptation of the Italian version, and the original Japanese version of the series have been released on home video separately in English-speaking markets due to the differences between the two versions. According to Anime Limited, these differences in video footage made it "simply not possible to include both language options" in one set. Discotek released the English dub in North America on Blu-ray on May 29, 2018, and on DVD on June 26, 2018, while the subtitled Japanese version was released on Blu-ray on April 30, 2019. On July 1, 2017, Funimation also started streaming a simuldub of the series with episodes airing every Sunday.

== Production ==
The series was announced at Mipcom in Cannes, France, in October 2014 to be broadcast in spring 2015 in Italy, but was delayed to August. The series was produced by Telecom Animation Film, with franchise veteran Kazuhide Tomonaga serving as chief director and Yoichiro Yane directing with scripts by Yūya Takahashi. Yuji Ohno returned as series composer. Tomonaga's aim was to mix the opposing elements of the franchise and combine them into a series that is both hardboiled and comical, realistic and fantastical. Producer Yû Kiyozono stated that the series was set in Italy due to the success achieved by the Lupin the Third franchise in that country.

== Reception ==
Daryl Surat of Otaku USA magazine refers to Part 4 as the "grand unification of Lupin styles" due to combining elements from several different eras of the franchise; "a bit dangerous like the originals, a bit silly like the 1980s 'pink jacket' Lupin, a bit bizarre like The Woman Called Fujiko Mine, a bit 'gentleman thief with a heart of gold' like Hayao Miyazaki's Cagliostro interpretation."
