= Lupin the 3rd Part 6 =

Japanese anime television series

- Key visual
- ルパン三世 PART6
- Based on: Lupin the 3rd by Monkey Punch
- Developed by: Takahiro Ōkura (#1–12); Shigeru Murakoshi (#13–24)
- Directed by: Eiji Suganuma
- Music by: Yuji Ohno
- Country of origin: Japan
- Original language: Japanese
- No. of episodes: 24 + Episode 0 (list of episodes)

Production
- Animator: TMS Entertainment
- Production company: "Lupin the 3rd Part 6" Production Committee (Note: Consisting of various companies.)

Original release
- Network: NNS (Nippon TV)
- Release: October 10, 2021 – March 27, 2022

Lupin the 3rd Part 6 (Japanese: ルパン三世 PART6, Hepburn: Rupan Sansei Pāto Shikkusu) is a Japanese anime television series produced at TMS Entertainment, directed by Eiji Suganuma, and written by Takahiro Ōkura and Shigeru Murakoshi. Part of the Lupin III franchise, it is the seventh anime television adaptation of the Lupin III manga series created by Monkey Punch. The series aired from October 2021 to March 2022 on Nippon TV and its affiliates.

== Premise ==
The first half of the series features gentleman thief Lupin III contending with detective Sherlock Holmes when Lupin becomes the top suspect in the murder of the former's longtime partner, Dr. Watson. Lupin is also after a treasure hidden by The Raven, a mysterious organization that manipulates the British government from the shadows. The second half revolves around Lupin's search for the mysterious woman Tomoe, whom Lupin believes to be his mother. Along the way, Lupin encounters other disciples of Tomoe, and begins to piece together forgotten memories of his past.

== Voice cast ==
Character	Voice actor (Japanese)	Voice actor (English)	Description
Lupin III	Kanichi Kurita	Tony Oliver	Grandson of Arsène Lupin. He is the world's most wanted thief and a genius mastermind.
Daisuke Jigen	Akio Otsuka; Kiyoshi Kobayashi ("Episode 0" only) (Note: This marks Kobayashi's final performance as Jigen before his retirement, having held the role since the first pilot film produced in 1969.)	Richard Epcar	Lupin's marksman. He is fast on the draw and shoots with amazing accuracy.
Goemon Ishikawa XIII	Daisuke Namikawa	Lex Lang	Lupin's swordsman. Thirteenth generation descendant of the renegade samurai Ishikawa Goemon who has a sword which can cut through almost anything.
Fujiko Mine	Miyuki Sawashiro	Michelle Ruff	Intelligent and crafty thief who sometimes collaborates with Lupin in his schemes.
Inspector Koichi Zenigata	Koichi Yamadera	Doug Erholtz	Police inspector working for the ICPO who has made it his mission in life to arrest Lupin.
Goro Yatagarasu	Nobunaga Shimazaki	Kaiji Tang	Younger ICPO police officer who serves as Zenigata's assistant.
Arianna	Nanako Mori	Courtney Lin	Young female ICPO police officer who works with Zenigata.
Albert d'Andrésy	Kenjiro Tsuda	Kaiser Johnson	Member of France's Central Directorate of the Judicial Police who was formerly Lupin's partner in crime.
Sherlock Holmes	Masato Obara	Yong Yea	Freelance detective who sometimes advises Scotland Yard. He lost his partner John H. Watson in an incident 10 years ago.
John H. Watson	Taisuke Nishimura	Joe Hernandez	Holmes' former companion and Lily's father.
Lily Watson	Sumire Morohoshi	Emi Lo	14-year-old school girl who lives with Holmes. She lost her memory in an incident 10 years ago, when she saw her father killed and then Lupin standing over his body.
Mattea Farah	Risa Shimizu	Suzie Yeung	A young woman working in a florist in New York. Lupin buys flowers from her as part of one of his schemes and takes a paternal interest in her.
Lord Falkner	Mitsuru Takakuwa	Doug Stone	Member of Raven and protector of information leading to Raven's hidden treasure. He was killed by a Raven hitman while in Scotland Yard.
Lestrade	Tomoyuki Shimura	Luis Bermudez	Scotland Yard Inspector who works closely with Holmes but is later revealed to be Watson's killer.
Professor James Moriarty	Akira Ishida	Khoi Dao	Criminal mastermind who holds a personal interest in both Holmes and Lupin.

== Production ==
Lupin the Third Part 6 is produced at TMS Entertainment and directed by Eiji Suganuma, who previously directed the Lupin TV special Prisoner of the Past in 2019. It is written by Takahiro Ōkura with character design by Hirotaka Marufuji. The series features scripts from guest writers like Mamoru Oshii, Masaki Tsuji, Taku Ashibe, Kanae Minato, and Akio Higuchi. The series was announced by TMS on May 26, 2021, and aired with an episode 0 from October 10, 2021, to March 27, 2022, on Nippon TV and other NNS networks, in conjunction with the 50th anniversary celebration of the anime, with Part I having premiered on October 24, 1971. On August 20, 2021, Sentai Filmworks licensed the series for home video and streaming on Hidive. The series began airing on Adult Swim's Toonami programming block in the United States starting on April 17, 2022, (Note: Adult Swim lists the series as premiering on April 16, 2022, at 1:30 a.m. (25:30) EDT/PDT, which is effectively April 17.) with the same dubbed episodes released weekly on Hidive starting on April 18, 2022. In Japan, the first twelve episodes were released in a Blu-ray box set on October 26, 2021. On January 7, 2022, it was announced that Shigeru Murakoshi would take over as series composition for Part 6, beginning with episode 13.
