= Lupin the 3rd Part III =

Japanese anime television series

- Image from the 2002 DVD box set of the series, released by VAP
- ルパン三世 PARTIII
- Based on: Lupin the 3rd by Monkey Punch
- Written by: Junichi Iioka; Hiroyuki Onoda
- Music by: Yuji Ohno
- Country of origin: Japan
- Original language: Japanese
- No. of episodes: 50

Production
- Producer: Tadahito Matsumoto
- Production companies: Yomiuri TV; Tokyo Movie Shinsha

Original release
- Network: NNS (YTV, NTV)
- Release: March 3, 1984 – December 25, 1985

Lupin the 3rd Part III (Japanese: ルパン三世 PARTIII, Hepburn: Rupan Sansei Pāto Surī) is a Japanese anime television series produced by Tokyo Movie Shinsha. Part of the Lupin III franchise, it is the third anime television adaptation of the Lupin III manga series created by Monkey Punch. The series aired on Yomiuri TV, Nippon Television and other NNS stations between March 3, 1984, and November 6, 1985.

Among English-speaking fans, the series is commonly known as the "Pink Jacket" series in reference to the title character's outfit, which replaces Part I's green jacket and Part II's red jacket with a bright pink one. The feature film Legend of the Gold of Babylon (1985) was released in theaters during the original broadcast run of this television series, and was the first film in the Lupin III franchise to feature the pink jacket, with the second one being the 2023 original net animation Lupin the 3rd vs. Cat's Eye.

== Premise ==
The series centers on the adventures of Lupin III, the grandson of Arsène Lupin, the gentleman thief of Maurice Leblanc's series of novels. He is joined by Daisuke Jigen, crack-shot and Lupin's closest ally; Fujiko Mine, the femme fatale and Lupin's love interest who works against Lupin more often than with him; and Goemon Ishikawa XIII, a master swordsman and the descendant of Ishikawa Goemon, the legendary Japanese bandit. Lupin is often chased by Inspector Koichi Zenigata, the rather cynical detective who has made it his life mission to catch Lupin.

== Cast ==
Character	Japanese
Lupin III	Yasuo Yamada
Daisuke Jigen	Kiyoshi Kobayashi
Fujiko Mine	Eiko Masuyama
Goemon Ishikawa	Makio Inoue
Inspector Koichi Zenigata	Gorō Naya

== Production ==
Yūzō Aoki, who had experience with the previous Lupin anime series as a key animator and storyboard artist, designed the characters and served as animation supervisor. Aoki proposed three character designs for Lupin in this series. A hard Lupin, a soft Lupin and a comical Lupin. His aim was to be in between the gritty style of Masaaki Osumi and the family friendly tone of Isao Takahata and Hayao Miyazaki from Lupin the 3rd Part I.

Towards the later half of the series, the production team revised the initial character designs to allow for a more cartoonish and expressive appearance, with the aim, in Aoki's words, of achieving a "simple yet satisfying result." Due to the diverse animation teams involved, as well as the decision to have three character designs for Lupin, the designs and overall look of the show tended to differ greatly from episode to episode and even within the same episode, an intentional decision from Aoki which let the animators express a wide range of creativity.

Music for the series including the opening and ending themes was written by Yuji Ohno. The opening theme "Sexy Adventure" was performed by Yūsuke Nakamura and the ending theme "Fairy Night" was performed by Sonia Rosa.

== Release ==
A DVD box set of the series was released in Japan on May 26, 2002, by VAP, followed by a Blu-ray box set on February 22, 2017. In December 2020, Discotek Media announced that they had licensed the series for North American release. They released all 50 episodes in a Blu-ray box set on August 31, 2021.

== Episodes ==
No.	Title	Directed by	Written by	Original release date
1	"The Gold Is Beckoning Lupin"; Transliteration: "Kinkai wa Rupan o Yobu" (Japanese: 金塊はルパンを呼ぶ)	Yūzō Aoki	Atsushi Yamatoya	March 3, 1984
Al "Scarface" Capone dies before he can tell his men where he hid his fortune in gold, and only leaves behind tiles that will lead them to it. Only thing is, he hid the others. When rumor breaks out the hunt is on to collect all the others and claim the gold getting the attention of Lupin and Fujiko. But they aren't the only ones who are interested; a Chinese crime boss and a mercenary-for-hire are also looking to get the gold.
2	"Expose the Great Trap"; Transliteration: "Ōinaru Wana o Abake" (Japanese: 大いなる罠を暴け)	Kenji Kodama	Kō Takashina	March 10, 1984
A gigantic meteorite made out solid gold is found, which has been planted by Zenigata in his latest plan to catch Lupin, who, of course, has his eyes set on it. With his new invention that erases peoples memory for an instant he is able to steal the gold, but Zenigata is fired as a result. But Lupin soon realizes that the loot he stole is not solid gold, it is only a rock with a gold coating. Lupin wants to find out who tricked him and the inspector wants to find out whoever stole the gold.
3	"Good Afternoon, Hell's Angel"; Transliteration: "Konnichiwa Jigoku no Tenshi" (Japanese: こんにちは 地獄の天使)	Saburō Hashimoto	Yutaka Kaneko	March 17, 1984
Lupin and Jigen travel to a city where legend has it that an angel lives in the highest room of the round tower in the city. Lupin launches himself from a cannon and enters the room where he finds a young girl named Aurora and he takes her with him. She eventually proves to be a great annoyance, and despite Lupin's and Jigen's efforts they can't get her to leave. And when certain people notice that she is missing, Lupin may have taken more than he had bargained for.
4	"Telepathy Is Love's Signal"; Transliteration: "Terepashī wa Ai no Signal" (Japanese: テレパシーは愛のシグナル)	Osamu Nabeshima	Kō Takashina	March 24, 1984
Lupin plans to steal the Spanish gold from a sunken ship, but a women-pirate group wants to steal it as well. The pirates decide to take advantage of Lupin by kidnapping Fujiko, and use her telepathy to figure out Lupin's every move.
5	"The Peerless Goemon"; Transliteration: "Goemon Musō" (Japanese: 五右ェ門無双)	Noriko Itakura	Yutaka Kaneko	April 7, 1984
When the gang heads to South Africa to find a Nazi treasure, Goemon accidentally commits a dishonour of slicing a woman's clothes off. Will Lupin be able to outwit the former Nazi? And can Goemon ever get the image of naked women out of his head?
6	"Lupin has Come with a Tank"; Transliteration: "Rupan ga Sensha de Yattekita" (Japanese: ルパンが戦車でやってきた)	Kenji Kodama	Hideo Takayashiki	May 19, 1984
Jigen stands by his old war buddy Giranko as they face an army together, refusing to leave him even with Lupin and Goemon's entreaties. What is Giranko hiding? And can Lupin withstand the might of an entire army?
7	"The Man Is Called the Death Garb"; Transliteration: "Shinigami Gābu to Yobareta Otoko" (Japanese: 死神ガーブと呼ばれた男)	Shigetsugu Yoshida	Yutaka Kaneko	May 26, 1984
An old acquaintance of Fujiko's, whom she abandoned to die, has returned for vengeance. How did Death Garb obtain his new power, and can Lupin devise a way to kill him?
8	"Virgin Mary's Getaway Strategy"; Transliteration: "Seibo Mariya no Dasshutsu Sakusen" (Japanese: 聖母マリアの脱出作戦)	Masaharu Okuwaki	Hiroko Hagita	June 9, 1984
Deep within the frozen Alaskan wilderness, a mysterious cult chants before a sold gold Virgin Mary idol. The high priest prophesizes the coming of the great demon who will steal their sacred artifact. All is not as it seems, however. What is the true identity of the high priest and his cult? And does somebody else have eyes for the Virgin Mary statue?
9	"The Copy-Man Comes Expensive"; Transliteration: "Kopī Ningen wa Takaku Tsuku" (Japanese: コピー人間は高くつく)	Saburō Hashimoto	Hideo Takayashiki	June 16, 1984
Lupin sees a doctor for an itchy foot, but the doctor steals his skin and starts making mass clones of Lupin. Therefore, Lupin must escape the clutches of Zenigata and stop the mad Doctor before his identity is mass-produced.
10	"Lay a Plot with the Treasure"; Transliteration: "Hihō wa Inbō no Nioi" (Japanese: 秘宝は陰謀の匂い)	Kenji Kodama	Hisato Sano	June 23, 1984
Lupin accepts a challenge from a police inspector: steal a diamond in a maximum security facility, or spend his whole life in prison. Will Lupin seek outside help to obtain the diamond? And why is Goemon practicing sword techniques on water balloons?
11	"The Ruby Sheds Bloody Tears"; Transliteration: "Rubī wa Chi no Ase o Nagasu" (Japanese: ルビーは血の汗を流す)	Noriko Itakura	Yasushi Hirano	July 7, 1984
In Chicago, a sniper kills a man under the orders of the mysterious "Mother". Even more strange, Fujiko seems to be under her spell. Lupin is on the trail of a mysterious ruby that bleeds every hundred years. As the said blood grants immortal life, he soon faces competition from other parties... Lupin has his work cut out for him as he struggles to escape Mother's crew of assassins, the sudden arrival of Zenigata, and even Fujiko.
12	"The Prisoner of a Valtan Palace"; Transliteration: "Barutankan no Toriko" (Japanese: バルタン館のとりこ)	Osamu Nabeshima	Tomoko Konparu	July 28, 1984
Lupin sets off to stop the forger Valtan, who keeps a family friend hostage and forces him to make forgeries of paintings. Things get tricky as Lupin struggles to rescue Sofia, outwit Zenigata, free his old friend, foil Valtan, and steal all the original paintings. Can he pull it off?
13	"Play a Joke on the Variation"; Transliteration: "Warunori Hensōkyoku" (Japanese: 悪のり変装曲)	Shigetsugu Yoshida	Seijun Suzuki	October 20, 1984
A deadbeat Lupin is tricked by Fujiko into infiltrating a women's party in a castle that turns out to be a rocket ship, which lands in a country where he is captured and about to be executed. Unfortunately, a storm of crows lands in the execution grounds, allowing Lupin to escape. Unfortunately, he must now survive this entire mess alive while being followed by Pops... and a mysterious lady with a death wish.
14	"Let's Play the Abduction Game"; Transliteration: "Yūkai Gēmu wa Osuki" (Japanese: 誘拐ゲームはお好き)	Saburō Hashimoto	Yasushi Hirano	October 27, 1984
Ms. Alma has gone missing for some time, and Lupin is suspected as the prime suspect. It's revealed that Ms. Alma wasn't actually kidnapped, and thanks to a little hypnosis, Lupin doesn't even remember what happened. She planned to frame Lupin for a supposed kidnapping, so that her son Ron, can have Fujiko all to himself.
15	"The Killer Comes Along Quietly"; Transliteration: "Koroshi ga Shizuka ni Yattekuru" (Japanese: 殺しが静かにやってくる)	Hajime Kamegaki	Toshimichi Ōkawa	November 3, 1984
16	"The Golden Apple has Poison"; Transliteration: "Ōgon no Ringo Niwa Doku ga Aru" (Japanese: 黄金のリンゴには毒がある)	Kenji Kodama	Hideki Sonoda	November 10, 1984
17	"Are You Really Getting Married?"; Transliteration: "Kekkon Surutte Hontō Desu ka" (Japanese: 結婚するって本当ですか)	Takashi Sokabe	Kō Takashina	November 17, 1984
18	"Show Time Smells of Death" or "Let's Dance to Death"; Transliteration: "Shōtaimu wa Shi no Kaori" (Japanese: ショータイムは死の香り)	Yūzō Aoki	Masaaki Sakurai	November 24, 1984
It's the Mafia Boss' birthday party and everyone is gambling away. Lupin's next target is the casino's safe. While attending the party, Lupin meets a girl named Jenny, an aspiring Broadway dancer, who is willing to help him pull off the heist to sell her name. Will the heist turn out to be a Broadway hit or a flop?
19	"An Act of Betrayal"; Transliteration: "Uragiri no Kōya o Hashire" (Japanese: 裏切りの荒野を走れ)	Kenji Kodama	Toshimichi Ōkawa	December 1, 1984
20	"Cross His Name Off the List"; Transliteration: "Kako o Keshita Otoko" (Japanese: 過去を消した男)	Masakatsu Iijima	Takayuki Kan	December 8, 1984
21	"Farewell, Golden Legend"; Transliteration: "Saraba Ōgon-densetsu" (Japanese: さらば黄金伝説)	Tōru Ogihara	Shōichirō Ōkubo	December 15, 1984
22	"The Fire Is Not Suitable for a Diamond"; Transliteration: "Dia ni Honō wa Niawanai" (Japanese: ダイヤに炎は似合わない)	Takashi Sokabe	Yasushi Hirano	December 22, 1984
23	"The Strategy of Beirut Mobile Bank Robbery"; Transliteration: "Beirūto Idō-ginkō-gōdatsu-sakusen" (Japanese: ベイルート移動銀行強奪作戦)	Hiroshi Ogawa	Yutaka Kaneko	December 29, 1984
24	"Pray for the Repose of Your Soul"; Transliteration: "Tomoyo Fukaku Nemure" (Japanese: 友よ深く眠れ)	Hajime Kamegaki	Shōichirō Ōkubo	January 12, 1985
25	"We Are not Angels"; Transliteration: "Oretachi wa Tenshi Janai" (Japanese: 俺たちは天使じゃない)	Tōru Ogihara	Kō Takashina	January 19, 1985
26	"The Ghost of New York"; Transliteration: "New York no Yūrei" (Japanese: ニューヨークの幽霊)	Yūzō Aoki	Yoshio Urasawa	January 26, 1985
27	"Code Name Is Alaska Star"; Transliteration: "Angōmei wa Arasuka no Hoshi" (Japanese: 暗号名はアラスカの星)	Rokō Ogiwara	Yutaka Kaneko	February 2, 1985
28	"The Alaska Star Is a Ticket to Hell"; Transliteration: "Arasuka no Hoshi wa Jigoku e no Hōshū" (Japanese: アラスカの星は地獄への報酬)	Rokō Ogiwara	Yutaka Kaneko	February 9, 1985
29	"Let's Go to the Honey-Moon"; Transliteration: "Tsuki e Honey-Moon ni Ikō" (Japanese: 月へハネムーンに行こう)	Rokō Ogiwara	Atsushi Yamatoya	February 16, 1985
30	"The Name of the Cocktail Is Revenge"; Transliteration: "Kakuteru no Na wa Fukushū" (Japanese: カクテルの名は復讐)	Takashi Sokabe	Yasushi Hirano	February 23, 1985
31	"Reversal. Reversal and Again Reversal"; Transliteration: "Gyakuten. Gyakuten mata Gyakuten" (Japanese: 逆転 逆転 また逆転)	Tsutomu Iida	Shigemitsu Taguchi	March 2, 1985
Mr Gellon employs a gang of smart luchadors to guard his valuable art gallery from Lupin. Both sides try every conniving trick in their arsenal to thwart the other; can Gellon and his luchadore henchman stop Lupin from making off with his entire gallery?
32	"10 million Dollar Key"; Transliteration: "1000man-doru no Kagi" (Japanese: 1000万ドルの鍵)	Rokō Ogiwara	Hiroshi Kashiwabara	March 9, 1985
Lupin is offered an irresistible challenge: steal the US President's limo. But when he realizes kidnapping is involved, sparks fly. Is Lupin destined to save the US government?
33	"A Boy Genius Plays a Dangerous Game"; Transliteration: "Tensai Shōnen no Kiken na Asobi" (Japanese: 天才少年の危険な遊び)	Rokō Ogiwara	Junichi Miyashita	March 16, 1985
The Macintosh Jewelry building is Lupin's next target, but he quickly finds himself having to rescue a kidnapped boy. Lupin must guard a child prodigy who holds the key to a scientific breakthrough... and who is a big pervert and fan of Lupin.
34	"Manhattan Crisis"; Transliteration: "Manhattan-crisis" (Japanese: マンハッタン·クライシス)	Tsutomu Iida	Hiroshi Kashiwabara	March 23, 1985
Lupin is in Manhattan to score the mafia's largest cash deposit, but in response they place a hefty bounty on him that all New York aims to collect! Can Lupin take a bite out of the Big Apple for himself, or is he going to be worm food?
35	"Target Was Gone Beyond the Snow Field"; Transliteration: "Tāgetto wa Hakugin no Hate ni" (Japanese: ターゲットは白銀の果てに)	Takashi Sokabe	Junichi Miyashita	March 30, 1985
When a heist of gold bullion goes awry, Lupin suspects a pair of adept disguise artists beat them to the score. He finds them tucked away in a mountain cabin but also finds himself Zenigata's prisoner! How will Lupin get his plan rolling and steal the gold for himself?
36	"The Eagle Alights on the Glory"; Transliteration: "Washi no Maioriru Toki" (Japanese: 鷲の舞い降りる時)	Rokō Ogiwara	Izo Hashimoto	April 6, 1985
Betraying Lupin once again, Fujiko steals a golden bird statue from him, but her heart has been stolen by Fallon. Fallon leads the rebel forces of a small African nation and believes the bird is the key to a legendary treasure that will overthrow the dictatorship. To find the treasure, they must penetrate the computer controlled defenses of the dictator's palace. Will the golden bird soar towards freedom?
37	"Pops Boils over with Rage"; Transliteration: "Tottsuan Ōi ni Ikaru" (Japanese: 父っつぁん大いに怒る)	Rokō Ogiwara	Yutaka Kaneko	April 20, 1985
An attempt to break an old man out of prison turns into a trap for Lupin. He can quickly escape from this trap, but others have set another more dangerous trap in motion. When Zenigata's rage boils over, Lupin has more to worry about than a set of cuffs.
38	"Letiethia Loved Me"; Transliteration: "Ore o Aishita Retishia" (Japanese: 俺を愛したレティシア)	Masakatsu Iijima	Junichi Miyashita	April 27, 1985
While trying to enjoy a simple Japanese meal, Goemon has been arrested and thrown into prison! This is all part of a scheme to use Goemon as leverage against Lupin. An arm to a mermaid statue is in the wreckage of the Santa Maria; if Lupin can retrieve it, Goemon will be freed as payment for Lupin's services. Can Lupin outwit everyone and resist the amorous advances of a dolphin?
39	"Give the Gold to the Rival"; Transliteration: "Raibaru ni Ōgon o" (Japanese: ライバルに黄金を)	Tsutomu Iida	Kō Takashina	May 11, 1985
A Neo Nazi organization has stolen a shipment of gold to finance their dream of a United States of Africa. Lupin is taking the blame for the job and for trying to kill Zenigata. Can Lupin clear his name when his opponent is a solid gold tank?!
40	"In a Panic over the Treasure"; Transliteration: "Ichimai no Otakara de Dai-konsen" (Japanese: 一枚のお宝で大混戦)	Takashi Sokabe	Yasushi Hirano	May 25, 1985
Lupin has lottery fever! However, he never leaves anything to random chance. All that stands between him and the jackpot is an elaborate security system. Thus Lupin tries to make security system work for him, yet there are few things that Lupin family has to do first. Note: The animation is intentionally off-model throughout the episode. Tatsuo Yanagino (sometimes incorrectly transliterate Tatsuo Ryuno) was the main animator for the episode, focusing on expressive and fluid animation.
41	"A Night under Martial Law"; Transliteration: "Kaigenrei no Yoru" (Japanese: 戒厳令の夜)	Rokō Ogiwara	Yutaka Kaneko	June 8, 1985
Lupin uses a coup d'etat to pilfer a nation's treasure... but finds the treasure already gone. While in disguise as an evil general, Jigen has also been wounded by a mysterious woman. Do the paths of revenge and avarice cross each other?
42	"Plunder the Pyramid of Insurance"; Transliteration: "Piramiddo no Hokenkin o Ubae" (Japanese: ピラミッドの保険金を奪え)	Mitsuo Giya	Shōichirō Ōkubo	June 22, 1985
Lupin decides to engage in a little pyramid scheme with two hired guns. Thus Lupin disguise himself as a certain person who can be trusted by two hired guns and deceive others easily. Can Lupin turn those giant stone bricks into giant piles of cash?
43	"Farewell, Cinderella"; Transliteration: "Saraba Shinderera" (Japanese: さらばシンデレラ)	Tsutomu Iida	Kō Takashina	June 29, 1985
A king concocts a scheme to find a new Cinderella to fit his diamond slipper. However, Lupin has a different ending in mind for this fairy tale. Therefore Lupin disguises himself as the fairytale princess to get that slipper. Who will win the happy ending?
44	"Our Papa Is a Thief"; Transliteration: "Boku-tachi no Papa wa Dorobō" (Japanese: ボクたちのパパは泥棒)	Masakatsu Iijima	Hiroshi Kashiwabara	July 6, 1985
Lupin, Jigen and Goemon have their eyes set on a jewel heist, but some children are claiming that they are their fathers! Jigen and Goemon scoff at Lupin's impropriety until they find themselves in the same mess. Can the gang juggle their jobs and fatherhood? Note: Lupin the 3rd: The Legend of the Gold of Babylon aired after this.
45	"A Toast to the Con-Game"; Transliteration: "Kon-gēmu ni Kanpai" (Japanese: コンゲームに乾杯)	Masakatsu Iijima	Hikaru Arai	July 20, 1985
The key to an unbreakable safe is hidden in a near impregnable prison. With a bit of help, Lupin makes off with the key, but crime boss Carlos makes off with the safe. As the two sides square off, can any of them remember the old saying about honor among thieves?
46	"Worn-Out Wings"; Transliteration: "Ore no Tsubasa wa Scrap" (Japanese: 俺の翼はスクラップ)	Yoshihiro Takamoto	Junichi Miyashita	July 27, 1985
Fujiko strands Lupin and the gang on an island and heads for treasure, and ends up in the hands of a dollmaker who tries to turn her into a doll. With Lupin and the gang stuck on a deserted island, can he rescue Fujiko and the treasure? Fly, Zantetsuken!
47	"A Famous Picture"; Transliteration: "Ichimai no Meiga" (Japanese: 一枚の迷画)	Yoshio Takeuchi	Hisato Sagawa	August 17, 1985
A young boy named Ken attacks Goemon! Ken's father was killed by the mafia after painting a picture that contains a treasure map. Goemon enlists Lupin's help to avenge Ken's loss. With Ken kidnapped, can Lupin reveal the painting's secret and keep Ken from suffering his father's fate?
48	"Tears Stood in Hades' Eyes"; Transliteration: "Hadisu no Namida" (Japanese: ハディスの涙)	Masaharu Okuwaki	Katsuyuki Nakamura	August 31, 1985
The Tears of Hades is an exquisitely large diamond embedded in a statue; Lupin plucks it from Hades's eye but soon finds more than meets the eye. The diamond holds secret plans, and a group of mercenaries want Lupin to exchange it for the life of a girl named Maria. Does Hades weep for joy or sorrow?
49	"Pops Was Adopted into the Family"; Transliteration: "Tottsuan ga Yōshi ni Natta hi" (Japanese: とっつぁんが養子になった日)	Tsutomu Iida	Yoshio Urasawa	September 28, 1985
Lupin wants to steal the valuable jewel of a famous female shot putter, but Zenigata is putting up a valiant defense. His efforts impress the lady so much that she wants to adopt him! Whose tenacity will win the day?
50	"Kill the Atomic Submarine Ivanov"; Transliteration: "Gensen Iwanofu no Massatsu-shirei" (Japanese: 原潜イワノフの抹殺指令)	Rokō Ogiwara	Hiroshi Kashiwabara	December 25, 1985
Lupin and Jigen steal the newly-finished Soviet nuclear submarine Ivanov so that they can salvage a massive hoard of gold coins in the Caribbean. Fujiko tags along with hopes of selling it to either the Chinese and CIA for a hefty price, while Pops smuggles himself aboard. Unfortunately, the Soviets are on the hunt for their sub too, and have no intention of losing it! Note: The animation is intentionally off-model for the majority of the episode. Tatsuo Yanagino was the main animator for the episode, focusing on expressive and fluid animation. OH! Pro was involved with the Zenigata scenes from 17:45 to 19:13 and Fujiko Mine in the Ivanov communicating to Robert and Colonel Mangovich due to the different character design, the latter appears in 18:13-18:17, 18:30-18:37 and 19:05-19:07.

== Reception and legacy ==
In 2018, Rose Bridges of Anime News Network wrote that Lupin the 3rd Part III is known as the "weakest" of the Lupin III TV series, "largely for its animation quality but also for some particularly goofy plots." Her colleague Mike Toole lamented that, "nobody ever talks about Pink Jacket Lupin. Pink Jacket Lupin the 3rd is actually kind of awesome, but also weird and ridiculous."

The sixth episode of 2018's Lupin the 3rd Part 5 was created as an homage to Part III.
