= Kazuhide Tomonaga =

Japanese animator

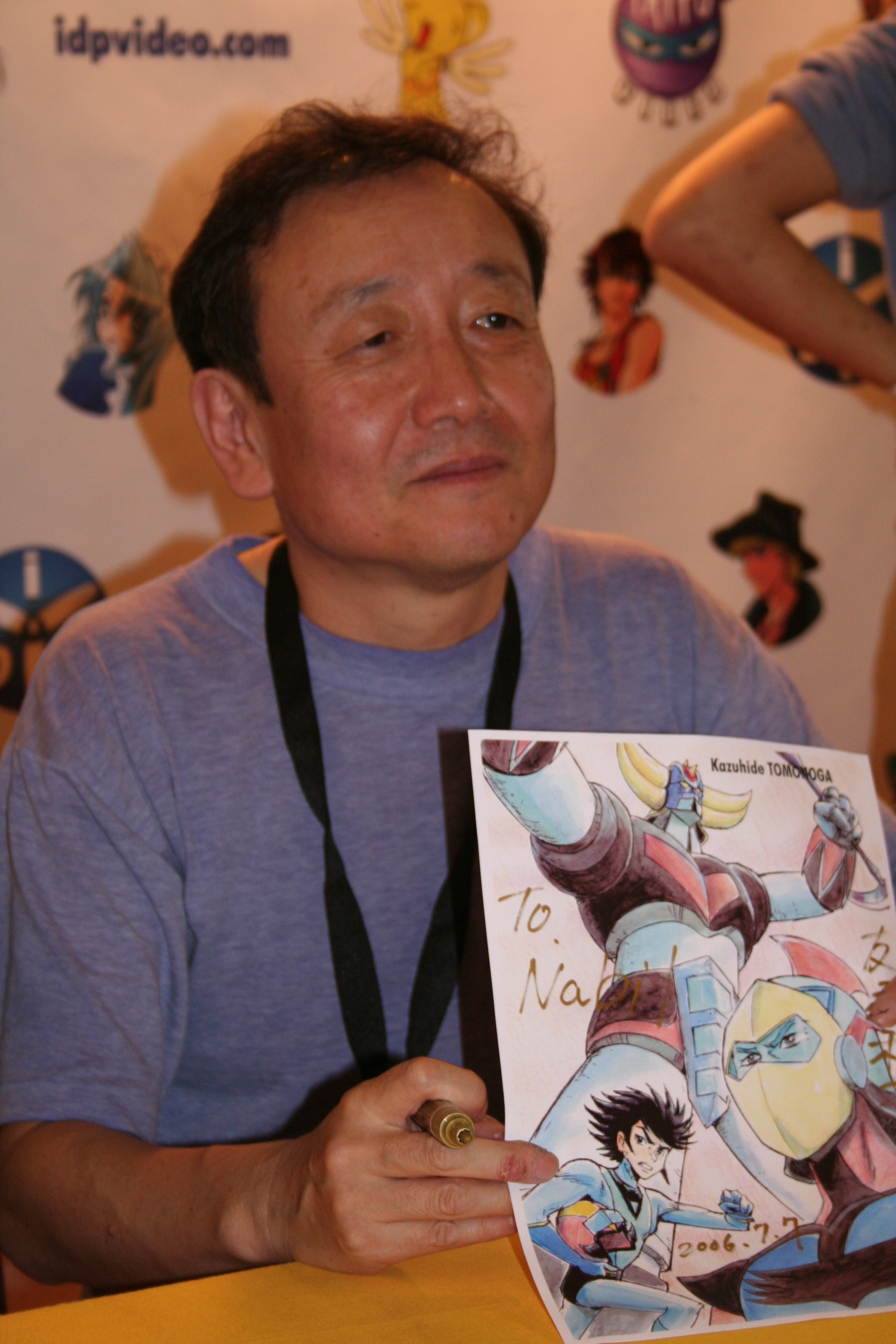
- Tomonaga at The Japan Expo in 2006
- Born: April 28, 1952 (age 73); Fukuoka Prefecture, Japan
- Occupations: Animator and character designer

Kazuhide Tomonaga (友永 和秀, Tomonaga Kazuhide; born April 28, 1952) is a Japanese director, animator, storyboarder, and cartoonist. he has worked at Toei Animation, Group TAC, Oh! Production, and TMS Entertainment. He worked as a director at Telecom Animation Film Company (a subsidiary of TMS), he is now freelance. He is a member of the Japanese Animation Creators Association (JAniCA). His style inspired another famous animator, Naotoshi Shida.

He is best known for his work on the Lupin the Third franchise; other works he is known for include Galaxy Express 999, Castle in the Sky, Little Nemo: Adventures in Slumberland, Mazinger Z, UFO Robot Grendizer, Space Battleship Yamato, Tiny Toon Adventures, Batman: The Animated Series, Animaniacs, The Cat Returns, Sonic X, Fullmetal Alchemist: Brotherhood, The Lord of the Rings: The War of the Rohirrim, the intro to Inspector Gadget, and the video game Kingdom Hearts.

== Biography ==
After graduating high school, he spent six months in Osaka working as a salaryman before moving to Tokyo.

== Career ==
Tomonaga made his start in animation in 1972 with the animated adaption of Devil Man. During his time at Tiger Production while under animator Takeshi Shirato, Tomonaga worked on the anime Mazinger Z and Space Battleship Yamato. He then worked at Oh! Production while Komatsubara Kazuo was drawing director, and worked on a number of anime including UFO Robo Glendizer, Magnerobo Ga Keen, and Superhuman Squadron Baratak. He was primarily responsible for the base drawings for Toei Doga's robot anime. In 1979, Tomonaga moved from Oh! Production to Telecom Animation. In 1980, he made his debut as an animation director with the movie Sugata Sanshirou. Since then, he has worked on both international and domestic works for Telecom Animation Film Company, as well as for their parent company TMS Entertainment.

He has received particularly positive critical reception on a number of scenes which include the battleship Yamato flashback scene for the 1974 TV animation Space Battleship Yamato, as well as the Battle of the Rainbow Star Cluster. Other well-received moments are the car chase in the 1979 Telecom Animation anime movie Lupin III: Castle of Cagliostro, as well as the battle scene against the Arcadia in the climax of the animated film Galaxy Railway 999.

In 1984, Tomonaga co-produced with Yoshifumi Kondo the three and a half-minute pilot for Little Nemo, which earned him recognition in the American animation industry, with some saying the pilot was one of his masterpieces.

According to fellow animator Yasuo Otsuka, Tomonaga is highly regarded for his skill with action, such as a strong sense of movement and skill with mechanical objects. Animator Yoshinori Kaneda worked with Tomonaga on Space Battleship Yamato and Galaxy Railway 999, and said of Tomonaga that he was "both a friend and a rival".

Production for the TV animation series Sherlock Hound began in 1982, with Tomonaga as animation director. Director Hayao Miyazaki modeled the appearance of the character Todd on Tomonaga

Tomonaga worked on the show openings for Inspector Gadget and Batman: The Animated Series through TMS. He was also an animation supervisor for the video game Kingdom Hearts through Telecom Animation Film Company. He also contributed to a number of Studio Ghibli films when Telecom Animation Film Company was hired by Ghibli for animation support. he was also the animation director, one of the key animators, and even Directed the episode "The Arrogant Palm of a Small Human" on Fullmetal Alchemist: Brotherhood when, once again, Bones, the studio behind the series, hired Telecom Animation Film Company for animation support. Tomonaga worked on the film The Lord of the Rings: The War of the Rohirrim when Sola Entertainment hired telecom to partner with them for the animation.

In June 2014, he retired from his position as a director of Telecom. Since then, he has continued to work as a sole proprietor under a contract with Telecom.

In 2016, Tomonaga was awarded an Animation Lifetime Achievement Award at the 25th Japanese Movie Critics Awards.

== Works ==
=== Video games ===
- Kingdom Hearts (2002) (animation supervisor) (outside contractors)

=== TV shows ===
- Devilman (1972–1973) (animator)
- Mazinger Z (1972–1974) (animator)
- Great Mazinger (1974–1975) (animator)
- Space Battleship Yamato (1974–1975) (animator)
- UFO Robot Grendizer (1975–1977) (key animator)
- Lupin the Third Part II (1977–1980) (key animator)
- Future Boy Conan (1978) (animator) (Oh! Production)
- Anne of Green Gables (1979) (animator)
- The New Adventures of Gigantor (1980–1981) (assistant animation director "The Dreaded Double Robot)
- Downtown Story (1981–1983) (animation director, season 1, episode 39)
- Inspector Gadget (1982–1986) (animator for the opening sequence)
- Sherlock Hound (1984–1985) (animation director/animator)
- Galaxy High (1986) (directing animator)
- DuckTales (1987–1990) (animator "Top Duck")
- The New Adventures of Winnie the Pooh (1988–1991) (animation director "The Great Honey Pot Robbery")
- Tiny Toon Adventures (1990–1992) (animation director)
- Fox's Peter Pan & the Pirates (1990–1991) (animation director) (TMS)
- Batman: The Animated Series (1992–1995) (animation director/key animator/layout artist/animator)
- Adventures of Sonic the Hedgehog (1993) (animation director)
- Animaniacs (1993) (key animator/animation director) (Tokyo Movie Shinsha Co. Ltd.)
- Superman: The Animated Series (1996–2000) (Director/storyboard artist/key animator/background key designer)
- The New Batman Adventures (1997–1999) (key animator)
- Cybersix (1999) (Director/key animator/animation director)
- Sonic X (2003–2005) (storyboard artist/key animator)
- Uninhabited Planet Survive! (2003–2004) (storyboard artist)
- Muteki Kanban Musume (2006) (key animator "Invincible Delivery Girl / Another Delivery Girl")
- Fullmetal Alchemist: Brotherhood (2009–2010) (Director "The Arrogant Palm of a Small Human"/key animator/animation director)
- Lupin the 3rd Part IV: The Italian Adventure (2015–2016) (Director-2 episodes)
- The Seven Deadly Sins: Four Knights of the Apocalypse (2023-2024) (key animator)
- Grendizer U (2024) (key animator)

=== TV Movie ===
- Sugata Sanshirô (1981) (animation director)
- The Blinkins: The Bear and the Blizzard (1986) (key animator)
- Lupin the III: Blood Seal ~Eternal Mermaid~ (2011) (key animator)

=== OVA ===
- The Fuma Conspiracy (1987) (animation director)
- Ozanari Dungeon (1991) (key animator)
- Tiny Toon Adventures: How I Spent My Vacation (1992) (animation director) (TMS)
- The Batman/Superman Movie: World's Finest (1997) (storyboard artist/background key designer/character and prop designer/key animator)
- Batman Beyond: Return of the Joker (2000) (key animator)
- Green Lantern: First Flight (2009) (director) (Telecom Animation Film)
- Justice League: Doom (2012) (storyboard artist)
- Superman vs. The Elite (2012) (key animator)

=== Shorts ===
- Little Nemo Pilot (1984/II) (animation director/key animator)
- Soreike! Anpanman: Tsumikijô no himitsu (1992) (animator)
- Buta (2012) (Director/Writer)

=== Films ===
- Farewell to Space Battleship Yamato (1978) (animator)
- The Mystery of Mamo (1978) (animator) (Oh! Production)
- Galaxy Express 999 (1979) (animator)
- The Castle of Cagliostro (1979) (design supervisor/key animator)
- Chie the Brat (1981) (animator)
- Castle in the Sky (1986) (key animator) (Telecom Animation Film)
- Little Nemo: Adventures in Slumberland (1989) (design development/story sketches/storyboard artist/animation director)
- Pom Poko (1994) (animator) (Telecom Animation Film)
- Farewell to Nostradamus (1995) (storyboard artist)
- WXIII: Patlabor the Movie 3 (2002) (animator)
- The Cat Returns (2002) (key animator) (Telecom Animation Film)
- Forest of Piano (2007) (key animator)
- The Wind Rises (2013) (key animator)
- Young Animator Training Project (2013) (Director)
- Lupin the 3rd vs. Detective Conan: The Movie (2013) (key animator)
- Lupin the Third: The Gravestone of Daisuke Jigen (2014) (key animator)
- Lupin III: The Italian Game (2016) (Director/key animator)
- Lupin the Third: The Blood Spray of Goemon Ishikawa (2017) (key animator)
- Lupin the Third: Fujiko Mine's Lie (2019) (key animator)
- Blue Thermal (2022) (key animator)
- The Lord of the Rings: The War of the Rohirrim (2024) (senior key animation director/supervising key animator)
