= Lupin the 3rd: Blood Seal of the Eternal Mermaid =

2011 Japanese anime television film

- Promotional poster

ルパン三世 血の刻印 〜永遠のMermaid〜 (Rupan Sansei Chi no Kokuin ~Eien no Mermaid~)
- Created by: Monkey Punch
- Anime television film
- Directed by: Teiichi Takiguchi
- Written by: Michihiro Tsuchiya
- Music by: Yuji Ohno
- Studio: Telecom Animation Film (animation) (Note: Animation production assistance (アニメーション制作協力) was provided by Nippon Animation.); TMS Entertainment (production)
- Licensed by: NA: Discotek Media
- Original network: NNS (NTV)
- Released: December 2, 2011
- Runtime: 94 minutes

Lupin the 3rd: Blood Seal of the Eternal Mermaid (Note: Japanese: ルパン三世 血の刻印 〜永遠のMermaid〜, Hepburn: Rupan Sansei Chi no Kokuin ~Eien no Mermaid~) is a Japanese anime television special animated by Telecom Animation Film and produced by TMS Entertainment, serving as the twenty-second television special in the Lupin the Third franchise, itself based on the manga series of the same name by Monkey Punch. Directed by Teiichi Takiguchi from a screenplay by Michihiro Tsuchiya, the special aired on Nippon Television on December 2, 2011, as part of the network's Kinyo Roadshow.

This was the first installment in the Lupin the Third franchise to feature new regular voice actors for Goemon Ishikawa, Fujiko Mine and Inspector Zenigata since Lupin the 3rd Part II in 1977, that being Daisuke Namikawa, Miyuki Sawashiro and Koichi Yamadera, replacing Makio Inoue, Eiko Masuyama and Gorō Naya respectively.

Discotek Media announced on August 12, 2018, that it has licensed the special in North America and was released on Blu-ray on July 30, 2019, followed by a DVD release a month later.

== Voice cast ==
| Character | Japanese voice actor | English voice actor |
|---|---|---|
| Lupin the 3rd | Kanichi Kurita | Tony Oliver |
| Lupin the 1st | Kanichi Kurita | Keith Silverstein |
| Daisuke Jigen | Kiyoshi Kobayashi | Richard Epcar |
| Goemon Ishikawa | Daisuke Namikawa | Lex Lang |
| Fujiko Mine | Miyuki Sawashiro | Michelle Ruff |
| Inspector Zenigata | Koichi Yamadera | Doug Erholtz |
| Maki | Haruka Shibuya | Cherami Leigh |
| Misa | Risa Shimizu | Cristina Valenzuela |
| Yao Bikuni | Risa Shimizu | Ellyn Stern |
| Himuro | Akira Ishida | Todd Haberkorn |
| Kageura | Shirō Saitō | Chris Tergliafera |
| Masae Todo | Masako Nozawa | Ellyn Stern |

== Production ==
In April 2011, it was reported that a new Lupin the 3rd anime project would air on NTV, which was later confirmed to be a television special. On October 9th, it was revealed that the voices of Goemon, Fujiko and Zenigata would change for the first time in 16 years.

== Reception ==
When the special debuted on NTV, the special received a 14.0% viewership reception.
