= Lupin the Third: The Woman Called Fujiko Mine =

2012 heist anime television series

- North American Blu-ray set, by Funimation

LUPIN the Third(ルパン ザ サード) ～峰不二子という女～ (Rupan za Saado ~Mine Fujiko to Iu Onna~)
- Genre: Action; Comedy; Psychological thriller
- Created by: Monkey Punch
- Anime television series
- Directed by: Sayo Yamamoto
- Produced by: Naoki Iwasa; Toshio Nakatani; Yu Kiyozono
- Written by: Mari Okada
- Music by: Naruyoshi Kikuchi
- Studio: TMS/Po10tial
- Licensed by: AUS: Hanabee; NA: Funimation (former) Discotek Media (current); UK: Manga Entertainment (former) Anime Limited (current)
- Original network: NTV
- Original run: April 4, 2012 – June 27, 2012
- Episodes: 13
- Anime film

Jigen's Gravestone
- Directed by: Takeshi Koike
- Produced by: Yu Kiyozono
- Written by: Yūya Takahashi
- Music by: James Shimoji
- Studio: Telecom Animation Film
- Licensed by: NA: Discotek Media
- Released: June 21, 2014
- Runtime: 51 minutes
- Anime film

Goemon's Blood Spray
- Directed by: Takeshi Koike
- Produced by: Yu Kiyozono
- Written by: Yuuya Takahashi
- Music by: James Shimoji
- Studio: Telecom Animation Film
- Licensed by: NA: Discotek Media
- Released: February 4, 2017
- Runtime: 54 minutes
- Anime film

Fujiko's Lie
- Directed by: Takeshi Koike
- Produced by: Yu Kiyozono
- Written by: Yuuya Takahashi
- Music by: James Shimoji
- Studio: Telecom Animation Film
- Licensed by: NA: Discotek Media
- Released: May 31, 2019
- Runtime: 57 minutes
- Original net animation

Zenigata and the Two Lupins
- Directed by: Takeshi Koike
- Written by: Yuuya Takahashi
- Music by: James Shimoji
- Studio: Telecom Animation Film
- Released: June 20, 2025
- Runtime: 54 minutes
- Anime film
- The Immortal Bloodline
- icon

Lupin the Third: The Woman Called Fujiko Mine (Japanese: LUPIN the Third(ルパン ザ サード) ～峰不二子という女～, Hepburn: Rupan za Sādo ~Mine Fujiko to Iu Onna~) is a 2012 adult anime television series produced by TMS Entertainment. Part of the Lupin the Third franchise, it is the fourth anime television adaptation of the Lupin III manga series created by Monkey Punch. Directed by Sayo Yamamoto, it aired on Nippon Television from April to June 2012. It focuses on the franchise's heroine, Fujiko Mine, as she undergoes various missions and encounters the rest of the Lupin III cast for the first time. Unlike the franchise's previous three televised anime, The Woman Called Fujiko Mine is more sexually oriented in order to capture the "sensuality" present in the original manga, as well as darker and more serious. It is also the only installment in the franchise to be directed by a woman and the first in which Lupin III is not the protagonist.

VAP released the anime on home video in four-disc DVD and Blu-ray box sets in September 2012. Funimation simulcasted the series, with English subtitles, on their website and Nico Nico for North American audiences as it aired in Japan. They released The Woman Called Fujiko Mine in Blu-ray and Blu-ray/DVD sets in August 2013, including an English-language dub. Manga Entertainment released a similar set in the United Kingdom in September, whereas Hanabee released it in Australasia in two parts, in October and November 2013.

The Woman Called Fujiko Mine received generally positive reviews from critics. It won the New Face Award at the 16th Japan Media Arts Festival in 2012.

== Background and production ==
In April 2011, it was reported that a new Lupin III animated television series would air in the fall on Nippon Television. However, NTV then said the project was only a TV special (Blood Seal of the Eternal Mermaid which aired in December), not a series. In 2012, Toho Cinemas announced that a promotional video for a "new television series premiering in April" would be shown at a Lupin 40th Anniversary event on March 18. Lupin the Third: The Woman Called Fujiko Mine was announced a week later as a thirteen episode serial. The series was part of the 40th Anniversary of the Lupin animated series, and the 45th Anniversary of the original manga.

The series was directed by Sayo Yamamoto who was given full creative control. Yamamoto wanted to use the original Lupin III manga and its adult themes as a basis for the series. Takeshi Koike was the character designer and animation director and Yamamoto requested he use the original manga character designs as a starting point. The visual approach to the series has been compared to Valkyria Chronicles.

Mari Okada was the main writer of the series, although Itsuko Miyoshi (ep 2), Dai Satō (ep 3, 7, 10), Shinsuke Ōnishi (ep 5) and Junji Nishimura (ep 8) served as episode writers. It was reported that the series would capture the "sensuality" present in Monkey Punch's original Lupin III manga in its "daring interpretation" of the franchise. The promotional video first shown at Toho Cinemas began being streamed by TMS Entertainment on YouTube on March 26.

The music of Lupin the Third: The Woman Called Fujiko Mine was composed by Naruyoshi Kikuchi, leader of the Date Course Pentagon Royal Garden band. Shinichirō Watanabe, known for directing Cowboy Bebop and Samurai Champloo and who collaborated with Yamamoto several times in the past, served as music producer.

== Voice cast ==
Character	Japanese	English
Fujiko Mine	Miyuki Sawashiro	Michelle Ruff
Lupin III	Kanichi Kurita	Sonny Strait
Daisuke Jigen	Kiyoshi Kobayashi	Christopher Sabat
Goemon Ishikawa XIII	Daisuke Namikawa	Mike McFarland
Inspector Koichi Zenigata	Kōichi Yamadera	Richard Epcar
Lieutenant Oscar	Yūki Kaji	Jessie James Grelle
Count Luis Y. Almeida	Kanji Furutachi	Bill Jenkins
Owl Head	Katsumi Chō	Kent Williams
Dr. Fritz Kaiser	Binbin Takaoka	Jerry Russell
Aisha	Sanae Kobayashi	Stephanie Sheh

== Release ==
The series was broadcast for thirteen episodes on Nippon Television between April 4 and June 27, 2012. The opening theme song is "New Wuthering Heights" (新・嵐が丘, Shin Arashi ga Oka) by Naruyoshi Kikuchi and Pepe Tormento Azucarar feat. Ichiko Hashimoto (reading the opening monologue in Japanese, with Michelle Ruff reading the opening monologue in English), while the ending theme is "Duty Friend" by NIKIIE. Funimation licensed the series and provided an English subtitled simulcast of the series on both their website and Nico Nico.

In Japan the series was released by VAP as DVD and Blu-ray boxsets on September 19, 2012. In North America, Funimation originally announced a date of July 30, 2013, for the home release of the series, with an art book included with a limited edition. However the art book was later cancelled and the release rescheduled to August 20, 2014, on Blu-ray or DVD and Blu-ray combo pack. Manga Entertainment licensed the series for the United Kingdom and released separate DVD and Blu-ray boxsets on September 16, 2013. In Australia the series was published by Hanabee as two DVD and Blu-ray combo sets on October 16 and November 20, 2013. They later released a four disc Blu-ray and DVD box set on December 3, 2014. On December 12, Jason DeMarco on Twitter said that Lupin III: The Legend of Fujiko Mine was considered to be aired on Toonami, but they could not make it work due to the show having too much nudity for their censors. It was later announced that Funimation's license for the anime series expired in August 2018. On September 14, 2020, Discotek Media announced that they had acquired the license for The Woman Called Fujiko Mine and they re-released the series on March 30, 2021.

== Other media ==
=== Music ===
The official soundtrack of the show was released on December 19, 2012, and features 42 tracks. It was released on US iTunes on January 29, 2013.

=== Lupin the IIIrd ===
==== Jigen's Gravestone ====
Lupin the IIIrd: Daisuke Jigen's Gravestone (LUPIN THE IIIRD 次元大介の墓標, Jigen Daisuke no Bohyō), directed by Takeshi Koike and produced by Yu Kiyozono, serves as a "continuation spin-off" to the TV series. The film focuses on the character Jigen and tells how he and Lupin became partners. Koike's fellow-Redline creators Katsuhito Ishii and James Shimoji served as adviser and music composer respectively. Yūya Takahashi wrote the screenplay. The film was split into two parts and had a limited screening at the Shinjuku Wald 9 theater from June 21–27, 2014.

It was released on DVD and Blu-ray on November 28, 2014, with an art book included in the limited edition. The 30-track soundtrack to the film was released on December 10, 2014. Discotek Media acquired a North American distribution rights to the film in 2014, and was retitled Lupin III: Jigen's Gravestone for the American market. Their Blu-ray and DVD of the film, released on April 5, 2016, includes the company's first original English dub, which was produced in cooperation with Bang Zoom! Entertainment. TMS Entertainment made the dubbed and subtitled versions of the film available for viewing on Hulu on April 25, 2015.

Film cast

Character	Japanese	English
Lupin III	Kanichi Kurita	Keith Silverstein
Daisuke Jigen	Kiyoshi Kobayashi	Dan Woren
Yael Okuzaki	Akio Hirose	Taylor Henry
Fujiko Mine	Miyuki Sawashiro	Cristina Vee
Queen Malta	Marika Minase; Beverly Staunton (singing voice)	Erica Lindbeck
Mamo	Kanji Obana	Kirk Thornton
Inspector Koichi Zenigata	Kōichi Yamadera	Richard Epcar

==== Goemon's Blood Spray ====
A follow-up to Jigen's Gravestone by the same staff, entitled Lupin the IIIrd: Goemon Ishikawa's Blood Spray (LUPIN THE IIIRD 血煙の石川五ェ門, Chikemuri no Ishikawa Goemon), was released on February 4, 2017, and on DVD and Blu-ray on May 26 of the same year, with an art book included in the limited edition. Discotek Media released the film in North America as Lupin III: Goemon's Blood Spray on October 29, 2019.

Goemon is hired as a bodyguard by Yakuza boss, Makio Inaniwa, who runs a gambling boat and is being threatened by internal factions. At the same time, Lupin attempts to steal the proceeds of the gaming vessel and meets Fujiko who had the same intention. Lupin and Fujiko decide to divide sales proceeds, but suddenly the boat explodes. Goemon heads for the engine-room and encounters the huge and powerful Hawk or "Bermuda ghost" with his twin axes who is seeking Lupin. While Goemon is fighting Hawk, Inaniwa dies in the flames, abandoned by his men. To avenge his father, Inaniwa Jr. sends Goemon to kill Hawk. Goemon finds Hawk but is easily beaten, and undertakes a punishing ordeal to understand why he lost. He returns to Inaniwa Jr. to take his punishment, but explodes at his men's insensitivity and brutality, and attacks them, leaving only Inaniwa Jr. standing. Goemon eventually finds Hawk again as he is pursuing Lupin and Daisuke. Goemon intervenes and confronts and defeats Hawk in a final bloody battle.

Film cast

Character	Japanese	English
Lupin III	Kanichi Kurita	Keith Silverstein
Goemon Ishikawa XIII	Daisuke Namikawa	Lex Lang
Daisuke Jigen	Kiyoshi Kobayashi	Dan Woren
Fujiko Mine	Miyuki Sawashiro	Cristina Vee
Inspector Koichi Zenigata	Kōichi Yamadera	Richard Epcar
Hawk	Takaya Hashi	Kirk Thornton
Makio Inaniwa	Takayuki Sugō	Richard Epcar
Salifa	Miyuki Kobori	Cristina Vee

==== Fujiko's Lie ====
A follow-up to Goemon Blood Spray by the same staff, entitled Lupin the IIIrd: Fujiko Mine's Lie (LUPIN THE IIIRD 峰不二子の嘘, Mine Fujiko no Uso), was released on May 31, 2019, and later on DVD and Blu-ray on August 23 of the same year. Discotek Media released the film in North America as Lupin III: Fujiko's Lie on March 31, 2020.

A young boy called Gene holds the key to $500 million that his father embezzled. The two are being targeted by the assassin Bincam who attacked Gene's father, Randy.

Film cast

Character	Japanese	English
Fujiko Mine	Miyuki Sawashiro	Cristina Vee
Lupin III	Kanichi Kurita	Keith Silverstein
Daisuke Jigen	Kiyoshi Kobayashi	Dan Woren
Bincam	Mamoru Miyano	Billy Kametz
Gene	Tomoe Hanba	Erika Harlacher
Randy	Masato Ohara	Ben Lepley

==== Zenigata and the Two Lupins ====
A follow-up to Fujiko's Lie and a prequel to The Immortal Bloodline by the same staff entitled Lupin the IIIrd: Zenigata and the Two Lupins (LUPIN THE IIIRD 銭形と2人のルパン, Zenigata to Futari no Rupan), was released on June 20, 2025, on Japanese streaming platforms and in English on March 2, 2026, on Amazon Prime Video.

An airport is bombed in the Roviet Union, a land of extreme cold. The suspect emerges as Lupin the Third, but the "other Lupin", whom Zenigata has cornered, insists on his innocence. Zenigata, a man of justice, confronts the mysterious "fake Lupin".

Film cast

Character	Japanese	English
Inspector Koichi Zenigata	Koichi Yamadera	Richard Epcar
Lupin III	Kanichi Kurita	Keith Silverstein
Daisuke Jigen	Akio Otsuka	Dan Woren
Fake Lupin	Kenyu Horiuchi	Alan Lee
Fujiko Mine	Miyuki Sawashiro	Cristina Vee
Goemon Ishikawa XIII	Daisuke Namikawa	Lex Lang

==== The Immortal Bloodline ====
Lupin the IIIrd the Movie: The Immortal Bloodline was released on June 27, 2025, in Japan. The film is the first traditionally animated feature-length solo Lupin the 3rd film in over 30 years and the first animated theatrical film not to feature Kiyoshi Kobayashi as Daisuke Jigen, following his retirement from the role in 2021 and his death the following year. The staff from the previous four films returned, including director Koike, screenwriter Takahashi and Telecom as the animation studio.

=== Other ===
Several different pieces of merchandise based on the series have been produced. Figures of Fujiko and Lupin from the show were created, while one of Jigen from the Jigen's Gravestone film was released at the end of 2014. Fujiko's and Jigen's came in different color schemes depending on the retailer. An artbook featuring original drawings of the TV series selected by Takeshi Koike was published as well.

== Reception ==
The Woman Called Fujiko Mine has been well received by critics. It won the New Face Award at the 16th Japan Media Arts Festival in 2012; and was named one of the best anime of 2012 by Otaku USA, who called the animation the most innovative of any series that year. The Japanese DVD release of the series was the fifth best-selling Japanese Animation DVD of its first week having sold 1,404 copies, while the Blu-ray version was the ninth best-selling on its respective Oricon chart with 2,802 copies.

Kotaku's Richard Eisenbeis hailed the series as "one of—if not 'the'—most beautiful anime ever made." Rebecca Silverman of Anime News Network (ANN) wrote a mostly positive review of the anime. She praised its darker tone and the tragic past of Fujiko, but particularly the overall plot; "Simply put, this is a series that has been very well planned, right down to the last scene." She notes that if the viewer is only familiar with the North American Geneon release of the second televised anime they will be surprised; "If you're going into this expecting wacky hijinks or crazy exploits, you will be disappointed. Lupin the Third: The Woman Called Fujiko Mine is a mature, slightly dark take on the franchise, and it succeeds in bringing new life to it while still remaining faithful to Monkey Punch's original." The only negative aspects she wrote were on the series' odd title opening and the amount of unjustified nudity. However, her colleague Jacob Hope Chapman disagreed with this, believing that the audio stands out in the opening and that the sexuality is completely in-line with the show's "aesthetic and never seems excessive or ill-fitting." Chapman also stated that "Fujiko's constant objectification" surprisingly builds to one of the most feminist-positive anime in years. Dallas Marshall of THEM Anime Reviews gave the series 4 out of 5 stars, praising the anime for being closer to the original manga's style in both story and animation.

In his review of the Jigen's Gravestone film, Paul Jensen of ANN had strong praise for the animation; stating that the film is worth watching at least once for the visuals alone. His biggest complaint was that the plot is essentially a cat-and-mouse game between the heroes and villains, with little else, but said "I'll take simple and focused over sloppy and complicated any day." Matt Schley of Otaku USA wrote that it "feels a bit restrained compared to the psychedelic madness that was [The Woman Called] Fujiko Mine." While he said the film is a "competent Lupin tale with more flair than the average Lupin TV special," he felt as if it was simply going through the motions. Reviewing the Goemon's Blood Spray film, Schley felt it improved on Jigen's Gravestone and saw more of director Takeshi Koike's personal touch reminiscent of Redline and Trava: Fist Planet. Kim Morrissy of ANN was surprised by how much action and emotional drama Fujiko's Lie featured despite its short runtime. She praised it for its "in-depth examination of Fujiko's character" and her interactions with Gene, but felt the villains were underdeveloped.
