= Kanichi Kurita =

Japanese actor and comedian (born 1958)

- 栗田 貫一
- Born: Yoshiyuki Kurihara (栗原 良之); March 3, 1958 (age 68); Tokyo, Japan
- Other names: Kurikan (クリカン); Kuri (栗ちゃん, Kuri-chan)
- Occupations: impressionist; voice actor; comedian
- Years active: 1984–present
- Agent: KD Entertainment
- Spouse: Sayaka Ōsawa

Kanichi Kurita (栗田 貫一, Kurita Kan'ichi; born March 3, 1958 as Yoshiyuki Kurihara (栗原 良之, Kurihara Yoshiyuki)) is a Japanese impressionist, comedian and voice actor.

A veteran impressionist, he is known in Japan as "one of the Four Heavenly Kings of impressionists". His most famous role as a voice actor is the titular character of the Lupin the Third anime franchise.

== Biography ==
=== Career ===
Kurita was originally a company employee, but when he went to karaoke with his colleagues and sang, he was praised for his singing voice, which resembled that of singer Hiromi Go, and he began to emulate his singing voice and gestures. In 1983, Kurita appeared on an amateur audition program and was scouted because of his impersonation skills, and made his debut as a professional impersonator in 1984.

While performing impersonations of various singers and actors, Kurita also began imitating Arsène Lupin III from the Lupin the Third series. This led to Kurita becoming friends with Yasuo Yamada, who was the voice of Lupin.

=== Lupin III ===
In 1995, Yamada collapsed due to a cerebral hemorrhage just before recording Lupin III: Farewell to Nostradamus and became unconscious. Due to this situation, the production company discussed the matter and decided to release the film in theaters with Kurita as a substitute for the role of Lupin, saying that he is a celebrity who has known Yamada and would not destroy the character image of Lupin that Yamada had built. Kurita was initially offered "just a little bit, please," which he accepted, mistakenly thinking that he only needed to perform one phrase. In reality, however, the situation was that no dialogue had been recorded at all, and Kurita had to handle all the lines, so he struggled with voicing Lupin.

After the film was released, Yamada passed away without regaining consciousness, and Kurita was again offered the role of Lupin as the official successor. Kurita turned it down several times, but the enthusiasm of the production staff, who followed him to the bullet train where he boarded for another job, broke him, and he accepted the offer.

Kurita's role as Lupin marked his debut as a voice actor. Unlike Yamada, Kurita began playing Lupin without any theatrical education or experience, and received severe criticism by many fans for a performance that fell short of Yamada's. On the other hand, there were many fans who supported and defended Kurita, who used impersonation techniques to protect the image of the character Lupin created by Yamada. Kurita said, "The ideal is to give the illusion that Mr. Yamada is playing the role," and thoroughly studied Yamada's way of speaking and intonation. He also worked very hard, being encouraged by his co-stars, and continued voicing Lupin.

In 2011, when some of the main cast members were replaced, Kurita began to give Lupin a little of Kurita's own personality. At the same time, he began to focus less on "recreating Yamada's voice" and more on "playing the character Lupin". On the other hand, he said that "protecting the character image of Lupin established by Yamada" is "a basic rule that must never be broken" since it was the reason he was cast in the first place. Even now, Kurita rewatches Lupin III: The Castle of Cagliostro on the day of recording and checks Yamada's voice before going to the site.

As of 2021, Kurita has become the oldest and the longest-serving performer among the main cast.

Kurita does not do much work as a voice actor, except for voicing Lupin, being mainly active as an impressionist.

== Impression repertoire ==
- Aki Yashiro
- Eiko Segawa
- Hiromi Go
- Keisuke Kuwata
- Masakazu Tamura
- Yasuo Yamada (Lupin III)

== Filmography ==
=== Television animation ===
List of voice performances in animated television shows
Year	Title	Role
1995	Lupin the 3rd: The Pursuit of Harimao's Treasure	Lupin III
1996	Lupin the 3rd: The Secret of Twilight Gemini	Lupin III
1997	Lupin the 3rd: Island of Assassins	Lupin III
1998	Lupin the 3rd: Crisis in Tokyo	Lupin III
1999	Lupin the 3rd: The Columbus Files	Lupin III
2000	Lupin the 3rd: Missed by a Dollar	Lupin III
2001	Lupin the 3rd: Alcatraz Connection	Lupin III
2002	Lupin the 3rd: Episode 0: The First Contact	Lupin III
2003	Lupin the 3rd: Operation Return the Treasure	Lupin III
2004	Lupin the 3rd: Stolen Lupin	Lupin III
2005	Lupin the 3rd: Angel Tactics	Lupin III
2006	Lupin the 3rd: Seven Days Rhapsody	Lupin III
2007	Lupin the 3rd: Elusiveness of the Fog	Lupin III
2008	Lupin the 3rd: Sweet Lost Night	Lupin III
2009	Lupin the 3rd vs. Detective Conan	Lupin III
2010	Lupin the 3rd: The Last Job	Lupin III
2011	Lupin the 3rd: Blood Seal of the Eternal Mermaid	Lupin III
2012	Lupin the Third: The Woman Called Fujiko Mine	Lupin III
2012	Lupin the 3rd: Record of Observations of the East - Another Page	Lupin III
2013	Lupin the 3rd: Princess of the Breeze - Hidden City in the Sky	Lupin III
2015	Lupin the 3rd Part IV: The Italian Adventure	Lupin III
2016	Lupin the 3rd: Italian Game	Lupin III
2018	Lupin the 3rd Part V: Misadventures in France	Lupin III
2019	Lupin the 3rd: Goodbye Partner	Lupin III
2019	Lupin the 3rd: Prison of the Past	Lupin III
2021	Lupin the 3rd Part 6	Lupin III

=== Theatrical animation ===
Year	Title	Role
1995	Lupin III: Farewell to Nostradamus	Lupin III
1996	Lupin III: Dead or Alive	Lupin III
2013	Lupin III vs. Detective Conan: The Movie	Lupin III
2014	Lupin the IIIrd: Jigen's Gravestone	Lupin III
2017	Lupin the IIIrd: Goemon's Blood Spray	Lupin III
2019	Lupin the IIIrd: Fujiko's Lie	Lupin III
2019	Lupin III: The First	Lupin III
2025	Lupin the IIIrd the Movie: The Immortal Bloodline	Lupin III

=== Original net animation (ONA) ===
- Lupin the 3rd vs. Cat's Eye (2023), Lupin III
- Lupin the IIIrd: Zenigata and the Two Lupins (2025), Lupin III

=== Original video animation (OVA) ===
Year	Title	Role
2002	Lupin III: Return of Pycal	Lupin III
2008	Lupin III: Green Vs. Red	Lupin III
2012	Lupin Family Lineup	Lupin III
2012	Lupin Shanshei	Lupin III
2018	Is Lupin Still Burning?	Lupin III

=== Video games ===
Year	Title	Role
1997	Lupin the 3rd: The Castle of Cagliostro: Reunion	Lupin III
1998	Lupin the 3rd: The Sage of Pyramid	Lupin III
2002	Lupin the 3rd: Treasure of the Sorcerer King	Lupin III
2003	Lupin the 3rd: Lost Treasure Under the Sea	Lupin III
2004	Lupin the 3rd: The Legacy of Columbus's Inheritance	Lupin III
2007	Lupin the 3rd: Lupin is Dead, Zenigata is in Love	Lupin III
2010	Lupin the 3rd: The Greatest Brain Battle in History	Lupin III

=== Dubbing ===
- Burn Notice, Michael Westen (Jeffrey Donovan)
