= Farewell to Nostradamus =

1995 Japanese animated film

Lupin III: Farewell to Nostradamus
- Theatrical release poster
- Directed by: Shunya Itō (Note: Chief Director (総監督)); Takeshi Shirato
- Screenplay by: Hiroshi Kashiwabara; Shunya Itō
- Based on: Lupin III by Monkey Punch
- Produced by: Tadahito Matsumoto; Kyō Itō; Toshio Nakatani; Kazuaki Itō
- Starring: Kanichi Kurita; Kiyoshi Kobayashi; Makio Inoue; Goro Naya; Eiko Masuyama
- Cinematography: Hajime Hasegawa
- Edited by: Takeshi Seyama
- Music by: Yuji Ohno
- Production companies: Tokyo Movie Shinsha; Telecom Animation Film
- Distributed by: Toho
- Release date: April 22, 1995
- Running time: 98 minutes
- Country: Japan
- Language: Japanese

Lupin III: Farewell to Nostradamus (Japanese: ルパン三世 くたばれ!ノストラダムス, Hepburn: Rupan Sansei Kutabare! Nosutoradamusu; lit. "Lupin III: Die! Nostradamus") is a 1995 Japanese animated science fiction action adventure comedy film. It is the fifth animated feature film based on the 1967–69 manga series Lupin III by Monkey Punch and the first time Lupin's voice is provided by Kanichi Kurita, following the death of Yasuo Yamada; a tribute to him appears after the credits in the original Japanese release.

In the film, Lupin III and his gang set their eyes on the book of Nostradamus, which in turn, attracts the interest of a US Presidential candidate as well as a cult that worships its author.

The North American release was done by Funimation Entertainment on DVD; it was released individually and later made a part of the "Final Haul" box set. For reasons unknown Funimation cut the tribute to Yasuo Yamada out of their release. Discotek Media released it on Blu-ray.

== Plot ==
In 1999, Lupin III and Daisuke Jigen steal a diamond and hide it in a doll. Inspector Zenigata attempts to catch the two, but they escape on an airplane. While on the plane, a girl named Julia steals Lupin's doll. Lupin chases her, leading him to Fujiko Mine, who is chaperoning her. Lupin tries to bargain with Fujiko in an effort to get the doll back, but their conversation is interrupted when the plane is hijacked.

The hijackers land the plane and request transportation and ransom in exchange for the women and children, as well as the Brazil National Football Team, who also boarded the plane. Meanwhile, a man named Chris watches the commotion from a distance and activates the bomb the hijackers have. When the bomb starts counting down, the hijackers become startled and the passengers use this opportunity to fight back and escape from the plane.

As Lupin and Jigen escape, Julia is kidnapped by Chris and his henchmen via helicopter. Fujiko then explains to Lupin and Jigen that Julia is the daughter of Douglas, who is campaigning to become President of the United States in the forecoming election. Meanwhile, a man named Rhisley, the head of a cult known as the Nostradamus Sect, speaks to a crowd of followers. He claims to have a book filled with the lost prophecies of Nostradamus and recites one of the verses which predicted the plane's hijacking.

In actuality, his book is a fake. The real one is in the safe on the top floor of the Earth Building, which belongs to Douglas. Fujiko reveals that she took the job of looking after Julia in order to break into the safe and steal the lost prophecies of Nostradamus. The three travel to the Earth Building and Fujiko meets with Douglas and his wife to tell them that Julia has been kidnapped while Lupin and Jigen try to break into the vault. Chris then makes an appearance on TV and demands that Douglas drop out of the presidential race in exchange for Julia. Douglas refuses, saying that the kidnapping will lead to sympathy for his campaign.

Lupin and Jigen fail to open the vault and Fujiko is kidnapped by Chris. While driving through the city searching for Fujiko, Lupin and Jigen come across Goemon Ishikawa XIII and convince him to join them. Lupin makes a plan to get himself arrested and sent to Execution Island, a prison where Lupin's Uncle Philip, as Philip was the only person who managed to get inside the vault. During Lupin's stay, Chris and the Nostradamus Sect take Uncle Philip and use a machine to extract the information on how to get into the vault, killing him in the process. Lupin takes Philips body and discovers that one of his eyes is fake, which he holds on to.

Jigen and Goemon arrive in a helicopter to help Lupin escape, but Lupin is shot by Chris and falls into the ocean. The next day, Lupin wakes up on an island and is being nursed back to health by a boy named Sergio and his grandmother. While on the island, he discovers that Fujiko is there as well, but Sergio's grandmother says that she's really a handmaiden of the Nostradamus Sect. Lupin follows Fujiko to a cathedral where the sect is located, where he finds out that Julia is being kept prisoner and Fujiko has lost her memory. Lupin is then discovered by the sect and thrown in a cell.

Meanwhile, Jigen and Goemon believe that Lupin is dead and stake out a black market weapons shop, waiting for Chris. He shows up with some henchmen and they partake in a short battle where Chris gets away. After the fight, Lupin contacts Jigen, informing him that the Nostradamus Sect is connected to the kidnapping and that he is being held prisoner by them. While this is taking place, Julia cuts off a wrist band that Fujiko is wearing and her memories return. Chris then meets with Rhisley and their plan is revealed. As more people join the Nostradamus Sect, and their lies become the only truths, they plan to gain enough power to have the entire world bow down to them.

As the sect closes in on them, Jigen and Goemon arrive and help Lupin, Julia, and Sergio escape, but Julia is kidnapped once again. They make their way back to the States and come up with a plan to get into the vault. Lupin recalls the fake eye he got from Uncle Philip and thinks that since the security system only recognizes the eyes of Douglas' immediate family, Philip must have used the eye to get into the vault. Meanwhile, the Brazilian Soccer Team is staying in the Earth Building when Chris uses his watch to activate the same wrist bands they're wearing that Fujiko had on earlier. The bands hypnotize them and they place several bombs throughout the building. Goemon discovers what's going on and informs the others about it.

The next day, Rhisley speaks to a crowd of people in front of the Earth Building and informs them that one of the verses states that the skyscraper will explode, leading to the people inside to evacuate. During the commotion, Lupin, Jigen, Fujiko, and Goemon make another attempt to break into the vault. However, Chris goes against Rhisley's plan and enters the building to steal the lost prophecies of Nostradamus for himself. He gets to the vault first, but the inside of the vault has a defense mechanism which creates the illusion of falling into an endless abyss. When Lupin and Jigen arrive, Julia gives them the prophecies of Nostradamus.

While Chris is still affected by the vault's illusion, he panics and activates the bombs with his watch. The building is severely damaged, but is still able to stand. Jigen, Goemon, and Fujiko are separated from Lupin and Julia, but Douglas gets parachutes to all of them. However, Chris comes to his senses and attacks Lupin and Julia. As the Earth Building continues to break apart, the vault collapses onto Chris, killing him. Lupin and Julia make their escape and Rhisley falls to his death.

When the disaster is over, Julia is reunited with her family. As the gang makes plans to sell the book of lost prophecies, Goemon discovers that Julia had doodled on several of the pages. Realizing, that it's now useless, they destroy the book. Julia returns the diamond to Lupin and they all watch as the Earth Building collapses.

== Cast ==
Character name	Voice actor	
Character name	Japanese	English
Character name	Japanese	FUNimation (2005)
Arsène Lupin III	Kanichi Kurita	Sonny Strait
Daisuke Jigen	Kiyoshi Kobayashi	Christopher Sabat
Fujiko Mine	Eiko Masuyama	Meredith McCoy
Goemon Ishikawa XIII	Makio Inoue	Mike McFarland
Inspector Zenigata	Goro Naya	Philip Willburn
Julia Douglas	Yumi Adachi	Laura Bailey
Chris	Akio Ōtsuka	Dameon Clarke
Douglas	Osamu Saka	Brice Armstrong
Mary Douglas	Fumi Dan	Colleen Clinkenbeard
Rhisley	Hosei Komatsu	Josh Martin
Uncle Philip	Jouji Yanami	Dameon Clarke
Sergio	Takaaki Hiyoshi	Aaron Dismuke
