= Lupin III: Dead or Alive =

1996 Japanese animated film by Monkey Punch

- Theatrical release poster
- Directed by: Monkey Punch (Note: Director); Hiroyuki Yano (Note: Animation director)
- Screenplay by: Hiroshi Kashiwabara
- Based on: Lupin III by Monkey Punch
- Produced by: Tadahito Matsumoto; Shinichirō Maeda
- Starring: Kanichi Kurita; Eiko Masuyama; Kiyoshi Kobayashi; Makio Inoue; Gorō Naya
- Cinematography: Hajime Hasegawa
- Edited by: Takeshi Seyama
- Music by: Takayuki Negishi; Yuji Ohno
- Production company: Kyokuchi Tokyo Movie
- Distributed by: Toho
- Release date: April 20, 1996
- Running time: 97 minutes
- Country: Japan
- Language: Japanese

Lupin III: Dead or Alive (Japanese: ルパン三世 DEAD OR ALIVE, Hepburn: Rupan Sansei Deddo oa Araibu) is a 1996 Japanese animated thriller action comedy film directed by Monkey Punch. It is the sixth animated feature film based on Monkey Punch's 1967 manga series Lupin III, and marks his first and only directorial effort.

== Summary ==
After breaking out a quartet of prisoners, including a cautious and jumpy prisoner named Spanky, Lupin III has set his sights on the national treasure of the country of Zufu, placed for safe-keeping on a mysterious floating island by Zufu's late king. The island's super-intelligent nanomachine defense mechanism proves to be too much for Lupin, Daisuke Jigen, and Goemon Ishikawa XIII to handle by themselves. The key to the system seems to be linked to Prince Panish, the only surviving member of the royal family. He is in hiding from Zufu's current ruler, General Headhunter, who recently acquired rule over the country when he executed a coup d'etat and killed the country's king.

Lupin's gang kidnap "Headhunter's daughter", Emerah, to get hold of the key, but she turns out to be a Zufu police agent named Olèander. Headhunter and his right-hand man, Crisis, not only want to kill Lupin but Olèander as well: a kind of "swift justice". Meanwhile, Fujiko Mine, pretending to be a secretary, is ordered to protect the real Emerah, the daughter of Dr. Voltsky, who is held prisoner by Headhunter. Headhunter lied to Emerah about Voltsky's fate, claiming he died. That night, as Fujiko helps Emerah escape, Olèander learns that Prince Panish is alive and falls in love with him; with his wish to be for peace across the kingdom. A few nights later, Inspector Koichi Zenigata traps Lupin, but the gang helps Lupin escape. As they escape Zenigata and the police, Olèander learns that she is being used by Headhunter, and is captured by Crisis.

Lupin learns that the key is a pendant around Olèander's neck and he comes up with an idea. Headhunter, Crisis, and Olèander arrive at the island. To their surprise, Prince Panish (Lupin in disguise) also arrives at the island. He asks Olèander to give him the key. She does, and the door opens to a large laboratory. In this laboratory, the characters learn that the security nanomachines are made from pure gold. Headhunter gains all the power to control the nanomachines on the island, but he narrowly avoids being shot by Lupin (as Prince Panish). The nanomachines only stay stable near Panish, so once Lupin's disguise is broken, the nanomachines turn hostile, killing Crisis in the ensuing chaos. Headhunter is about to finish Lupin, but Lupin places a bullet in a fractured tendril and uses a knife to activate the firing pin. The bullet goes through Headhunter's head, seemingly killing him. Lupin and his friends escape the crumbling island, returning to their hideout to avoid capture by Zenigata, the inspector.

While normalcy seems to return, Headhunter suddenly reappears, moments after Jigen, Goemon, Fujiko, and Lupin have gone their separate ways. The members of the gang had planned for this, and attacked him from all sides. Goemon finishes Headhunter off by slicing through him, revealing that he was made entirely of nanomachines as he dissolves into a pile of gold dust. Zenigata shows up and attempts to cuff Lupin, but Lupin escapes by use of a fake hand. In the end, Lupin's gang goes their different ways: Jigen to the west, Goemon to the east, Fujiko to the south, and Lupin to the north.

== Production ==
Monkey Punch, the original creator of Lupin III, was the director of the film. However, he claims it was not something he wanted to do. He was initially offered but turned it down. However, the production had a short deadline, and as there was no director, he finally accepted. He said the experience was too demanding and claimed that it was the other people involved that "saved" the film, and added that he never wants to direct again.

Monkey Punch designed the opening and ending, but screenwriter Hiroshi Sakakibara filled in the rest. Additionally, assistant director Hiroyuki Yano made the computers look like Apple Macintoshes because they were Monkey Punch's favorite.

The film's theme song is "Damage no Amai Wana" (Damageの甘い罠) by Media Youth.

== Cast ==
Character name	Voice actor	
Character name	Japanese	English
Character name	Japanese	Funimation (2005)
Lupin III	Kanichi Kurita	Sonny Strait
Fujiko Mine	Eiko Masuyama	Meredith McCoy
Daisuke Jigen	Kiyoshi Kobayashi	Christopher Sabat
Goemon Ishikawa XIII	Makio Inoue	Mike McFarland
Inspector Zenigata	Gorō Naya	Phillip Wilburn
Olèander	Minami Takayama	Colleen Clinkenbeard
Prince Panish	Tōru Furuya	Sonny Strait
General Headhunter	Banjō Ginga	Kyle Hebert
Crisis	Nachi Nozawa	Chris Patton
Emera	Chisa Yokoyama	Colleen Clinkenbeard
Spanky	Shigeru Chiba	Chris Rager

== Release ==
Lupin III: Dead or Alive was released in Japanese theaters in April 1996.

Funimation Entertainment released the film on DVD in North America in 2005, including an English-language dub. The following year, they included it in their "First Haul" DVD box set. Discotek Media released it on Blu-ray in North America on October 25, 2022, including Funimation's English dub.
