= Goemon Ishikawa XIII =

Fictional character from manga series Lupin III

- Lupin III character
- Goemon drawn by Monkey Punch
- First appearance: Lupin III chapter 28: "The Coming of Goemon", April 4, 1968 (Weekly Manga Action)
- Created by: Monkey Punch
- Portrayed by: Gō Ayano (2014) (Note: Lupin the 3rd)
- Voiced by (Japanese): Makio Inoue (1977–2012); Daisuke Namikawa (2011–present); Other: Gorō Naya (1969) (Note: Pilot Film (CinemaScope version)); Osamu Kobayashi (1970) (Note: Pilot Film (TV version)); Chikao Ohtsuka (1971–72) (Note: Lupin the Third Part I); Kaneto Shiozawa (1987) (Note: The Fuma Conspiracy); Shingo Horii (1998) (Note: Lupin III D2 Manga)
- Voiced by (English): Lex Lang (2002–2007; 2017–present); Other: William Ross (Frontier Enterprises/Toho International: 1979) (Note: The Mystery of Mamo); Steve Kramer (Streamline Pictures: 1992–93) (Note: The Castle of Cagliostro, Lupin the Third Part II eps. 145 and 155); Ardwight Chamberlain (Streamline Pictures: 1995) (Note: The Mystery of Mamo); Mark Franklin (AnimEigo: 1995) (Note: The Fuma Conspiracy); Garrick Hagon (Manga Entertainment: 1996) (Note: The Mystery of Mamo, Bye Bye, Lady Liberty); Michael Gregory (Animaze/Manga Entertainment: 2000) (Note: The Castle of Cagliostro); Mike McFarland (Funimation: 2002–13) (Note: The Secret of Twilight Gemini, The Pursuit of Harimao's Treasure, Dragon of Doom, Voyage to Danger, Farewell to Nostradamus, Tokyo Crisis, The Columbus Files, Dead or Alive, Island of Assassins, Missed by a Dollar, The Woman Called Fujiko Mine)

In-universe information
- Alias: Samurai (Note: Used in Frontier Enterprises/Toho International's dub of The Mystery of Mamo, TMS' subtitled print of The Castle of Cagliostro and Cliff Hanger)
- Occupation: Rōnin; Thief; Spy
- Weapon: Katana
- Relatives: Goemon Ishikawa (ancestor)
- Nationality: Japanese

Goemon Ishikawa XIII (Japanese: 十三代目 石川 五ェ門 or 十三代目 石川 五ヱ門, Hepburn: Jūsan-daime Ishikawa Goemon) is a fictional character created by Monkey Punch for his manga series Lupin III, which debuted in Weekly Manga Action on August 10, 1967. Goemon is a thirteenth generation descendant of the renegade samurai Ishikawa Goemon. He is famous for a reticent personality coupled by apparent unlimited skill in martial arts and swordsmanship with his sword Ryusei (流星), known in the anime as Zantetsuken (斬鉄剣). A partner with Arsène Lupin III and Daisuke Jigen, he tends to join their exploits only on a when-interested basis.

== Creation ==
Goemon is unique to the series as he is the only member of the main cast not introduced from the start of the manga. Monkey Punch stated that, as none of the existing cast seemed especially Asian, he added Goemon as "a very traditional Japanese male character" to balance the manga. As such, Goemon was primarily based on the character Kyūzō, the master swordsman of Akira Kurosawa's 1954 film Seven Samurai; from the role came Goemon's strict demeanor and fast draw blade, as well as the long-faced countenance of actor Seiji Miyaguchi.

== Description ==
In the original manga, Goemon first appears as a very dangerous enemy of Lupin in chapter 28 "Appearance of Goemon" (五右ェ門登場, Goemon Tōjō). Lupin attempts to steal Goemon's master's alchemic formula for impervious sword blades through infiltration of Goemon's clan, but his cover is blown by Fujiko Mine, who is Goemon's girlfriend at the time. Goemon tries to kill Lupin over the next several installments, making attempts ranging from hiring assassins as skilled as Daisuke Jigen himself, to entering the service of three martial arts masters, to planting bombs in Lupin's belongings. However, he later decides that he could learn more working for Lupin than against him, and rather abruptly switches his allegiance. His position at Lupin's side is cemented when Lupin ruins the government's case against the man who killed Goemon's uncle, allowing Goemon to take his revenge as brutally and publicly as he wants without having to break into prison to do so.

By the events of the second manga series, Lupin trusts Goemon implicitly, and Goemon reciprocates. When a rival of Lupin's captures and hideously tortures Goemon, Goemon refuses to even respond to his interrogation, except to say that Lupin would find him and allow him to take revenge. Lupin then captures and seduces his rival's wife, and uses the information gleaned to rescue Goemon, who slays his captor with Jigen's help.

In the original anime Goemon's relationship to Lupin starts off more professional than close friendship. By the second anime series, Goemon has developed a true loyalty to Lupin. However, he easily gets annoyed by Lupin's antics, especially Lupin's infatuation with women and Fujiko Mine in particular. He will occasionally oppose Lupin directly when Lupin's jobs or actions do not agree with his morals. He has even promised that the last act he will take with Lupin is delivering his deathblow. Yet Goemon doesn't hesitate to help Lupin in serious situations, and readily assists him any time Lupin works for a just cause. However, in 1978's The Mystery of Mamo, he claims that he helps Lupin simply so he can keep his vow to kill him himself.

Goemon has a much more amicable relationship with Jigen. Goemon sees Jigen as a fellow honorable warrior, while Jigen sees Goemon as a trustworthy "foxhole buddy", and the two are frequently paired together during jobs, and usually help keep Lupin in check. On the odd occasion and increasingly in recent years, Goemon will ally himself with Fujiko, in spite of his distrust of her.

== Personality ==
Being a master of several classic Japanese martial arts, Goemon excels at Kenjutsu and Battōjutsu. Using his trademark Zantetsuken sword (carried in an unadorned shirasaya without a hand guard) he has the ability to cut through virtually any substance, even flying bullets, steel girders, automobiles, and multi-storied buildings. His training includes Jujutsu, Aikido, and Karate, enabling barehanded vanquishing of several attackers at once with minimal effort. In spite of his invincible weapon and his martial arts expertise, Goemon prefers to incapacitate rather than kill opponents, usually by destroying their weapons and clothes with lightning fast sweeps of his sword. Since katanas traditionally must cut flesh before being returned to the scabbard, Goemon reacts to his non-lethal use of Zantetsuken by exclaiming, "I have cut yet another worthless object." (またつまらぬ物を斬ってしまった, Mata tsumaranu mono o kitte shimatta)

Goemon has an extreme sense of pride in his abilities, and when he cannot accomplish a task, feels shame and remorse afterward. Breaking Zantetsuken, as he did in a battle with Flinch in The Mystery of Mamo, is a common cause of shame. He will also feel chagrin when he succumbs to his weaknesses, as when a woman ran off with his sword in Memories of the Flame: Tokyo Crisis. On many of these occasions, Goemon will leave to meditate or further train to rid himself of his weak points.

Goemon as seen in Episode 0: The First Contact

Goemon shows allegiance to Japanese culture as strictly as his traveling and unique lifestyle can allow; he often travels on the exterior of vehicles at casual MPH, but will relent to riding normally in chases. He dresses in a hakama and fundoshi, and prefers wearing his hair long and somewhat unevenly cut. He only eats Japanese cuisine and is willing to fast rather than settle for any Western options. He is a firm believer in Buddhism and Shinto. Although he may toast with champagne, his drink of choice is sake. He occasionally has been seen smoking a kiseru and usually wears a Sugegasa style hat.

Goemon's most often-seen pastime is meditation. Even under threat or when locked up, he is typically seated on the floor in a state of mental seclusion so deep he cannot be budged from his position. Other activities Goemon favors include fishing, attending noh theater, listening to enka jazz, and participating in martial arts competitions.

Although typically a person of mellow aloofness, Goemon has been seen exploding with frustration, admiring beautiful women, and (very rarely) screaming in fright. Such out-of-character moments are usually treated as humorous takes. If Goemon has a true weakness, it is that he's a sucker for women. He readily trusts any woman who seems superficially trustworthy or innocent, often landing him in much trouble. At the same time, he fears sultry women will distract him from his training, and tends to blush or flee when any woman puts him in a less-than-modest situation.

== Actors ==
=== Animation ===
Goemon Ishikawa was first voiced by Gorō Naya in the CinemaScope version of the 1969 anime pilot film, while Osamu Kobayashi voiced him in the pilot's adapted TV version. Naya preferred the role of Zenigata because he had more lines, and took that role upon the anime's production; Chikao Ōtsuka was given the role of Goemon when the first anime was produced (1971–72). Goemon was taken over by Makio Inoue for the second anime (1977–78), who continued to voice the character until 2010. The only exception was for the 1987 original video animation The Fuma Conspiracy, due to budget concerns, TMS decided not to employ the regular voice cast, so Goemon was instead voiced by Kaneto Shiozawa.

The 2011 TV special Blood Seal of the Eternal Mermaid marked the first appearance of Daisuke Namikawa as Goemon Ishikawa; Namikawa continues to voice Goemon. Inoue briefly returned to the role for the 2012 Lupin Family Lineup short original video animation, which reunited all surviving original Lupin III cast members.

William Ross voiced Goemon in the 1979 Toho English dub of The Mystery of Mamo, where his name was changed to "Samurai". Ross founded Frontier Enterprises, the studio that produced this dub under his direction. Other voice actors include Steve Kramer (1992-3, Streamline), Mark Franklin (1995, AnimEigo). Ardwight Chamberlain (1995, Streamline), Garrick Hagon (1996, Manga UK), and Michael Gregory (2000, Animaze/Manga). Mike McFarland voiced the character for Funimation Entertainment's dubs of several TV specials and theatrical films between 2002 and 2005, and their 2013 dub of The Woman Called Fujiko Mine.

Lex Lang voiced Goemon in the Phuuz dub for Pioneer/Geneon's release of the second anime between 2003 and 2006. The Discotek Media dub for Part IV, which largely reunited the Part 2 dub cast, saw the return of Lang as Goemon; he continues to regularly voice the character in dubs of movies and television shows. Lang also voices Goemon in the Bang Zoom! Entertainment dub for spinoff movie Goemon's Blood Spray, which features a different cast for the rest of the main roles.

=== Live-action ===
The 2014 film Lupin the Third featured TV and film star Gō Ayano as the first live-action Goemon. According to IMDB, it was originally arranged to present the filmed Goemon in contemporary suit and tie with Director Ryûhei Kitamura expressing "it would be nonsense for Goemon to exist in current society wearing samurai garb and carrying around a katana." Apparently due to the demand of fans world over, this idea was scrapped and the completed film features Gō Ayano as a swordsman wearing robes similar to his drawn and animated counterparts.

== Reception ==
In 2007, Oricon magazine polled readers on which characters they would most like to see in their own series. Goemon appeared in the number eight position on the female readers polls, and seventh place in the combined poll.
