= Lupin III (manga) =

Japanese manga series by Monkey Punch

- Cover of the first English-language volume of Lupin III released by Tokyopop

ルパン三世 (Rupan Sansei)
- Genre: Action; Comedy; Mystery
- Manga
- Written by: Monkey Punch
- Published by: Futabasha; Chuokoron-Shinsha
- English publisher: NA: Tokyopop
- Magazine: Weekly Manga Action
- Original run: August 10, 1967 – May 22, 1969
- Volumes: 14

Lupin III (Japanese: ルパン三世, Hepburn: Rupan Sansei) is a Japanese manga series written and illustrated by Monkey Punch. It follows the escapades of master thief Lupin III, the grandson of Arsène Lupin, the gentleman thief of Maurice Leblanc's series of novels.

Lupin III began serialization in Weekly Manga Action in August 1967 and has spawned a media franchise that includes several manga, seven animated television series, six theatrically-released animated films, two live-action films, twenty-six animated television specials, two musicals, and numerous music CDs and video games. The manga was released in North America by Tokyopop between 2002 and 2004.

== Premise ==
The predominately episodic chapters of the manga follow the crimes of Lupin III, grandson of gentleman thief Arsène Lupin. Considered the world's greatest thief, Lupin is known for announcing his intentions to steal valuable objects by sending a calling card to the owners of his desired items. A master of disguise and ruthless killer who is often hired to work as a mercenary or bodyguard, Lupin is typically pursued across the globe by Inspector Koichi Zenigata. Lupin often runs into Fujiko Mine, a beautiful female thief who typically uses her body to get what she wants or to make her targets easier to kill. The character Daisuke Jigen often works as a bodyguard or hitman, and is the person Lupin teams up with most frequently. Another recurring character is Goemon Ishikawa XIII, a master swordsman. Due to the episodic nature of the series, Lupin might work with Fujiko, Jigen or Goemon in one chapter, and then try to kill them in another.

== Production ==
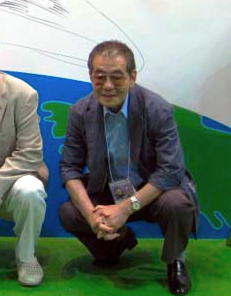
Author Monkey Punch based his protagonist on Maurice Leblanc's character Arsène Lupin.

The series was created by Japanese manga artist Kazuhiko Katō under the pen name Monkey Punch. When Futabasha decided to start a weekly magazine, they asked him to create a series for it, which became Lupin III. His inspiration for the series was the fictional French gentleman thief Arsène Lupin, created by Maurice Leblanc. Before creating the series he read 15 of Leblanc's stories. The aim of the Lupin III series was to produce a comedy adventure series that reflected the traits of Leblanc's character. Originally the intention was to keep the blood ties between the two fictional characters secret, however he was convinced by others not to do so.

When Monkey Punch began Lupin III, he was already working on another series, Pinky Punky. Monkey Punch enjoys writing outlaw characters, and both Lupin III and Pinky Punky made use of outlaws as central characters. According to him, this made it easy for him to write two series without much pressure. Monkey Punch enjoys puzzles and mysteries such as Columbo and Agatha Christie novels, and was also inspired by The Three Musketeers and the movies of Alfred Hitchcock. He believes the characters of Lupin and Fujiko are similar to the characters of D'Artagnan and Milady de Winter, and describes them as "Not necessarily lovers, not necessarily husband and wife, but more just having fun as man and woman with each other". Another influence on the manga was Mad magazine. Monkey Punch said the appeal of drawing Lupin comes from the character being able to go anywhere without obstacles and being able to do whatever he wants, whenever he wants. However, this is contrasted by the appeal of Zenigata's strict personality. Originally the series was only expected to last three months, but due to its popularity, Monkey Punch continued to draw it. However, despite his happiness at its success, he has expressed confusion over its popularity.

Monkey Punch has said that he believes the story can never end but that if he had to, both Zenigata and Lupin would have to end as equals. They would either both fail, both win or both get very old.

=== Characters ===
Monkey Punch combined elements of Arsène Lupin with James Bond to develop the character of Lupin III and made him a "carefree fellow". Lupin was given a red color jacket which Monkey Punch believes is a flashy, sexy color. As the series was to be published in a magazine targeted at adults, Fujiko Mine was created to add a female presence and to fulfill a "Bond girl" role. Her name was inspired by a picture of Mount Fuji, Monkey Punch added the -ko female suffix to create her first name, and chose "Mine" for her family name because of its meaning as "summit". At the beginning of the series, many of the women Lupin encounters are all named Fujiko, but are treated as different characters from chapter to chapter. Creating a new female each week was too difficult for Monkey Punch so she evolved into a single character who changes style frequently. Jigen was based on James Coburn, especially his role in The Magnificent Seven, and his name was chosen to reflect his unconventional personality. Goemon was created to give an oriental element into an otherwise western series. Despite Lupin and Goemon originally being enemies, Monkey Punch decided that they were on the same wavelength. While Lupin, Fujiko, Jigen and Goemon frequently operate together for their own goals, the author considers them not to be a true group as they have their own individual interests. Inspector Zenigata was conceived as Lupin's archrival to create a "human Tom and Jerry".

== Copyright issues ==
Monkey Punch did not ask permission to use the Arsène Lupin name and at the time Japan did not enforce trade copyrights. By the time Leblanc's estate launched legal action in Japan, the name was considered to have entered into common use. Monkey Punch has stated that using the same character design, behavior and face would be illegal, but using a name alone is not illegal.

== Publication ==
The original manga series was written and illustrated by Monkey Punch. It was serialized by Futabasha in the seinen manga magazine Weekly Manga Action in 94 chapters from August 10, 1967. Additional chapters known as Lupin III New Adventures (ルパン三世 新冒険, Rupan Sansei Shin Bōken) were released from August 12, 1971. Monkey Punch stated that there was a bitter dispute between Futabasha and Chuokoron-Shinsha over who would publish the collected volumes of the series. The artist revealed that a compromise was made where each company would publish half. Tokyopop licensed the series for North America, and released all 14 volumes between December 10, 2002, and July 6, 2004. The Tokyopop edition is adapted from the Chuokoron Shinsha edition from 1989. In Europe, the series was licensed by Star Comics in Italy and Ediciones Mangaline in Spain. Following Monkey Punch's death in April 2019, a book compiling various Lupin III and New Adventures stories was published by Futabasha on July 12, 2019, as Lupin III Masterpiece Collection (ルパン三世傑作集, Rupan Sansei Kessaku-shū). A second volume was released on October 12, 2021. Seven Seas Entertainment released the first hardcover collection in English as Lupin III (Lupin the 3rd): Greatest Heists – The Classic Manga Collection on December 21, 2021. They released the second volume as Lupin III (Lupin the 3rd): Thick as Thieves - The Classic Manga Collection on August 1, 2023.

== Reception ==
In Manga: The Complete Guide, Jason Thompson referred to Monkey Punch's original manga as "a crazy, groovy 1960s world of dynamite and backstabbing, hippies and gangsters", and considered it "a fascinating homage to Mad magazine and a four star example of comics as pure comedy." He rated the series four out of four stars. Allen Divers of Anime News Network praised the strong writing and action; however, he felt that the art was too primitive. Otaku USA's Daryl Surat was also put off by the art, saying he couldn't tell most characters apart and had a hard time figuring out what he was looking at. In The Rough Guide to Manga, Jason S. Yadao highlighted the example of how Lupin wearing a hat looks exactly like Zenigata. However, he considered it a successful plot device in once chapter that while it may take several attempts to understand, eventually pays off. He included the series in his list of 50 essential manga. Many of the first volumes of the English edition of the Lupin III manga released by Tokyopop made it onto ICv2's list of top 50 graphic novels, as well as later volumes from the series.

Anime News Network had four writers review Seven Seas Entertainment's release of the Greatest Heists collection. Grant Jones gave it a perfect 5 out of 5 rating and called it "a creative highlight reel of outrageous goofery. Lupin is a gag manga in heist's clothing. This is James Bond by way of Tex Avery. Golgo 13 presented by Akira Toriyama." He praised the episodic nature of the series for allowing the iconic characters to get into globe-trotting hijinks involving fast cars, meticulous heists, and slapstick comedy, "all without being weighed down by the structural demands of a larger narrative." Rebecca Silverman and MrAJCosplay both gave the collection four star ratings. Silverman cited the stories that show Lupin's skill with disguises as the best because it allows their plots to "twist and convolute in exciting and silly ways." She noted that the English translation sometimes uses period-appropriate language but other times feels a tad too modern and described the art as "all over the place," but called the stories mostly a lot of fun. MrAJCosplay however, praised the "rubbery expressiveness" of the art as a welcoming surprise. He called the collection a perfect personification of the "more out-there aspects of Lupin's career. Even amongst the violence and innuendos, there's a surprisingly childish sense of playfulness with the characters and how they approach everything."

Giving it a three ½ star rating, Christopher Farris felt the book is best-suited for already established fans of Lupin III and described it as "more of an aesthetic sampling" of Monkey Punch's distinctive art and storytelling, which makes it an "appreciable treat." He had issue with how the collection does not present the stories in their original publication order. Jones and Silverman both noted that those only familiar with the franchise from the anime adaptations that portray Lupin as a "lovable thief," might be surprised by the original manga's adult tone.
