= List of Lupin III characters =

The main cast of Lupin III, as drawn by Monkey Punch. Clockwise from upper right: Lupin, Jigen, Zenigata, Goemon, Fujiko.

The Lupin the Third franchise created by Monkey Punch follows the crimes of thief Lupin III, the grandson of Arsène Lupin. He often teams up with the skilled marksman Daisuke Jigen, the beautiful female thief Fujiko Mine, and the modern-day samurai Goemon Ishikawa XIII, while typically pursued across the globe by Inspector Koichi Zenigata.

Monkey Punch's original manga differs significantly in both characterization and content compared to most anime adaptations. While the manga features explicit depictions of sex and violence, anime iterations tend to be more family-friendly.

== Main characters ==
=== Lupin III ===
Lupin III (Japanese: ルパン三世, Hepburn: Rupan Sansei) is the grandson of gentleman thief Arsène Lupin. He is the world's most wanted thief and a genius criminal mastermind. He is an expert in making schemes and plots to steal precious objects that are heavily guarded and seemingly impossible to be stolen. He sometimes appears incompetent, but mostly as a charade to catch his opponents off guard. While he has been arrested and thrown in jail on a number of occasions, he has always managed to break out. He also has a fondness for fancy gadgets from time to time. His infatuation with women, and Fujiko Mine in particular, is perhaps his biggest weakness, as it often lands him in undesirable situations.

=== Daisuke Jigen ===
Daisuke Jigen (次元 大介, Jigen Daisuke) is Lupin's marksman. He can perform a 0.3-second quick-draw and shoots with amazing accuracy. He is often seen having a used cigarette clenched in between his teeth. His weapons of choice are revolvers and pistols, but he is also proficient in the use of other firearms, such as machine guns, sniper rifles, and anti-tank rifles. In the opening of the PlayStation 2 video game, Treasure of the Sorcerer King, Jigen assembles his handgun from composite parts and fires a shot through a door with 100% accuracy before an enemy can finish turning the doorknob.

=== Fujiko Mine ===
Fujiko Mine (峰 不二子, Mine Fujiko) is an intelligent and crafty thief who will use her feminine charms to get what she wants from any man. She is also an expert when it comes to firearms and even rivals Lupin when it comes to her burglary and disguise skills. Fujiko is sometimes an associate in his schemes, sometimes a rival, knowing full well that his infatuation with her will mean that he will forgive her for double-crossing him at times. She will also routinely make deals with Zenigata or Lupin's current enemy in an attempt to gain her freedom or to hopefully gain a piece of the loot he is after.

=== Goemon Ishikawa XIII ===
Goemon Ishikawa XIII (十三代目 石川 五ェ門, Jūsan-daime Ishikawa Goemon) is a thirteenth generation descendant of the renegade samurai Ishikawa Goemon. He has a sword called Ryusei (流星, Ryūsei), known in the anime as Zantetsuken (斬鉄剣), which can cut through almost anything. The Zantetsuken is usually used to cut inanimate objects, which Goemon considers unworthy of his blade. Objects cut by Zantetsuken will fall apart a couple of seconds after he sweeps through them with his blade. He is usually quiet and participates in Lupin's exploits less frequently than Jigen.

=== Inspector Koichi Zenigata ===
Inspector Zenigata (銭形警部, Zenigata-keibu), full name Koichi Zenigata (銭形 幸一, Zenigata Kōichi), is a police inspector working for the ICPO. He has made it his mission in life to arrest Lupin. Zenigata is based on a famous Japanese crime fighting character named Zenigata Heiji. While usually portrayed as competent but slow at deductions in the various anime, Zenigata's character in the manga is a very clever and crafty adversary to Lupin. In addition, despite trying to kill each other in the manga on numerous occasions, Lupin and Zenigata never take these opportunities in the anime, even saving each other's life on more than one occasion.

=== Main Japanese cast timeline ===
The following shows the timeline of current actors for each character, either live or animated.

Current cast

- Kanichi Kurita – Lupin III (1995–present)
- Akio Ōtsuka – Daisuke Jigen (2021–present)
- Miyuki Sawashiro – Fujiko Mine (2011–present)
- Daisuke Namikawa – Goemon Ishikawa (2011–present)
- Kōichi Yamadera – Inspector Zenigata (2011–present)

Former cast members

- Taichirō Hirokawa – Lupin III (c.1969; died 2008)
- Kiyoshi Kobayashi – Daisuke Jigen (c.1969–2021; died 2022)
- Eiko Masuyama – Fujiko Mine (c.1969, c.1971, 1977–2011, 2012; died 2024)
- Gorō Naya – Goemon Ishikawa (c.1969); Inspector Zenigata (1971–2011, 2012; died 2013)
- Shinsuke Chikaishi – Inspector Zenigata (c.1969)
- Nachi Nozawa – Lupin III (c.1971; died 2010)
- Yukiko Nikaido – Fujiko Mine (1971–1972; died 2026)
- Osamu Kobayashi – Goemon Ishikawa (c.1971; died 2011)
- Chikao Ohtsuka – Inspector Zenigata (c.1971); Goemon Ishikawa (1971–72; died 2015)
- Yasuo Yamada – Lupin III (1972–95; died 1995)
- Makio Inoue – Goemon Ishikawa (1977–2011, 2012; died 2019)

The Fuma Conspiracy cast

- Toshio Furukawa – Lupin III (1987)
- Banjou Ginga – Daisuke Jigen (1987)
- Mami Koyama – Fujiko Mine (1987)
- Kaneto Shiozawa – Goemon Ishikawa (1987; died 2000)
- Seizou Katou – Inspector Zenigata (1987; died 2014)

D2 Manga cast

- Keiichi Nanba – Lupin III (1998)
- Daisuke Gōri – Daisuke Jigen (1998; died 2010)
- Chisa Yokoyama – Fujiko Mine (1998)
- Shingo Horii – Goemon Ishikawa (1998)
- Yukimasa Kishino – Detective Zenigata (1998)

Lupin Zero cast

- Tasuku Hatanaka – Lupin III (2022–23)
- Shunsuke Takeuchi – Daisuke Jigen (2022–23)

Live action cast

Strange Psychokinetic Strategy cast

- Yūki Meguro – Lupin III (1974)
- Kunie Tanaka – Daisuke Jigen (1974; died 2021)
- Eizo Ezaki – Fujiko Mine (1974)
- Shirō Itō – Inspector Zenigata (1974)

Lupin the 3rd cast

- Shun Oguri – Lupin III (2014)
- Tetsuji Tamayama – Daisuke Jigen (2014–2023)
- Meisa Kuroki – Fujiko Mine (2014)
- Gō Ayano – Goemon Ishikawa (2014)
- Tadanobu Asano – Inspector Zenigata (2014)

Inspector Zenigata cast

- Ryohei Suzuki – Inspector Zenigata (2017)

Stage play cast

I'm Lupin

- Lou Oshiba – Lupin III (1998)
- Hoshino Kenji – Daisuke Jigen (1998)
- Saori Sara – Fujiko Mine (1998)
- Hironobu Kageyama – Goemon Ishikawa (1998)
- Edo Yamaguchi – Inspector Zenigata (1998)

Search for the Queen's Necklace!

- Seina Sagiri – Lupin III (2015)
- Sakina Ayakaze – Daisuke Jigen (2015)
- Seshiru Daigo – Fujiko Mine (2015)
- Shō Ayanagi – Goemon Ishikawa (2015)
- Seika Yumeno – Inspector Zenigata (2015)

Kabuki play

- Kataoka Ainosuke VI – Lupin III (2023)
- Saburō Ichikawa – Daisuke Jigen (2023)
- Emiya Ichikawa – Fujiko Mine (2023)
- Onoe Matsuya II – Goemon Ishikawa (2023)
- Chūsha Ichikawa – Inspector Zenigata (2023)

Note: Two versions of the pilot were produced circa 1969 and 1971 but widely released only decades later.

== Supporting characters ==
=== Melon Cop ===
Melon Kiichi (メロン奇一, Meron Kiichi), usually referred to as "Melon Cop" (刑事メロン, Keiji Meron), is Zenigata's assistant in the manga series Shin Lupin III (known in English as Lupin III: World's Most Wanted). His skills include decryption and handcuff-tossing. Unlike Zenigata, Melon prefers using deadly force to stop Lupin and his gang. By the end of the series he is largely reduced to secondary character status, appearing only rarely, and simply to help Zenigata fight Lupin. Melon also seems to be capable of facing Lupin without Zenigata's help, fully defeating him on several occasions, only to have Lupin escape with the help of Jigen or Fujiko. Episode 28 of the second anime series adapts Melon Cop's first appearance, albeit with key differences. Zenigata goes to France to capture Lupin where he is assigned a partner, Melon Ganimard (ガニマール・メロン, Ganimāru Meron), a female detective and the granddaughter of Inspector Ganimard, rival of the original Arsène Lupin. She also appears in episode 23 of Part 5.

=== Clarisse d'Cagliostro ===
Lady Clarisse d'Cagliostro (クラリス・ド・カリオストロ, Kurarisu do Kariosutoro) is the last princess of the small grand duchy of Cagliostro in the anime film The Castle of Cagliostro. She is a good friend to Lupin, for whom she first encountered during his thieving career when she was a child. Her parents, the previous Grand Duke and Grand Duchess of Cagliostro, were killed in a fire which destroyed her original home the grand ducal palace. The last surviving member of the country's ruling family, Clarisse is a rightful heiress to the throne but has been forced by the country's regent, Count Lazare d'Calgiostro, to marry him. During the car chase, she meets up with Lupin who discovers that her signet ring is the key to the legendary lost treasure of Cagliostro, which is the only reason the count wants to take her as his wife with his own ring. While uncovering the secret of the Goat bills, Lupin has to expose the count's evil plan and rescue Clarisse from his clutches. Clarisse also makes a brief cameo in the first episode of Part 5.

She is named after Clarisse d'Etigues, the daughter of Baron Godefroy d'Etigues and the wife of the original Arsène Lupin who died in 1899 after giving birth to their son Jean in The Countess of Cagliostro. She is voiced by Sumi Shimamoto in Japanese and by Joan-Carol Henning and Barbara Goodson in the Streamline English dub, Bridget Hoffman in the Manga dub, and Cherami Leigh Kuehn in the Discotek dub.

=== Lieutenant Oscar ===
Lieutenant Oscar (オスカー警部補, Osukā Keibuho) is Zenigata's young assistant in The Woman Called Fujiko Mine anime series. Born in France, Oscar has an androgynous appearance drawing comparisons to the character of the same name from the shōjo manga The Rose of Versailles. He is not only extremely loyal to Zenigata, but fosters romantic feelings for him as well.

=== Rebecca Rossellini ===
Rebecca Rossellini (レベッカ・ロッセリーニ, Rebekka Rosserīni), also known as Rebecca Lupin, is a major protagonist in the Part IV anime series. She is a wealthy Sammarinese businesswoman, heiress, model, actress, and athlete from San Marino who marries Lupin after meeting him at a party. She secretly leads a double life as a thief, committing daring heists for the sheer adrenaline rush. The marriage is revealed to be a mere ruse, with Rebecca tricking Lupin in order to use him as a distraction while she steals a valuable crown for her own thrill and entertainment. Later in the series she starts to actually fall in love with him and asks to keep the Mrs. Lupin name as a secret code between them. Rebecca also appears in the final episode of Part 5, helping Lupin against the shady IT conglomerate Shake Handz. She is voiced by Yukiyo Fujii in Japanese and by Cassandra Lee Morris in English.

=== Ami Enan ===
Ami Enan (アミ・エナン) is a young computer expert and a major protagonist in the Part 5 anime series. Her main gadget is a cybernetic computer link-up system called "Underworld" which she wears in place of earrings. Ami was kidnapped at the age of 6 by child pornographers; but after they discovered her tech skills when she created a computer game by herself, they realized that using those skills would be more lucrative than pornography for them. She created the payment system for the darknet market site Marco Polo, but at the age of 14 escaped and hid in the Twin Towers, a complex with one tower above ground and one deep below water.

She is recruited initially by Lupin to steal digital currency from Marco Polo, but her computer and hacking skills become useful to his team when Marco Polo initiates a vicious online manhunt for Lupin in revenge. After they survive the manhunt, Lupin and Zenigata have Ami enroll in an all girls' school to restart her life where she befriends Dolma, the crown princess of an East Asian country called Padar. Ami remains close to Zenigata, who can be considered a father figure who continues to care for her well-being despite her affiliation with Lupin.

Over time, Ami's trust in Lupin turns into love, and she begins to regard Fujiko, Lupin's off-and-on love interest, as a rival for his heart. Later, it is revealed that Ami is the daughter of Enzo Bron, CEO of the Shake Handz Corporation and inventor of PeopleLog, a program capable of flawlessly identifying people and providing any publicized information about them, which quickly pitches all sorts of malevolent people against Lupin. When Lupin tries to take down PeopleLog and free Fujiko, who has been taken prisoner by Enzo, he ends up outmaneuvered and wounded by Enzo's machinations. After making a full recovery, however, Lupin turns PeopleLog against his creator by publicizing every political scandal he can get his hands on, branding Shake Handz a terror organisation. On his second try against Enzo, he ends up outsmarting PeopleLog, inspiring Enzo with his unpredictability and heroism into reconciling with Ami. At the end of the series' finale, Ami concludes that while she still loves Lupin, she chooses not to get too close to him in order to preserve his heroic image in her heart. After the fall of Shake Handz, she and Enzo are sheltered by Zenigata. She is voiced by Inori Minase in Japanese and by Cristina Vee in English.

=== Albert d'Andrésy ===
Albert d'Andrésy (アルベール・ダンドレジー, Arubēru Dandorejī), introduced in the Part 5 series, is member of France's Central Directorate of the Judicial Police who was originally Lupin's partner in crime. Albert is referenced by Lupin as the "man who abandoned Lupin" since Albert left thievery for a more lucrative path in the government with ambitions of controlling France. Posing as their mentor Gaston, Albert tricks Lupin in acquiring a copy of black notebook detailing corruption and scandals in the French government. However, he is forced to side with Lupin when the notebook fell into the hands of assassins working for presidential candidate Calvess. He would play a role in taking down ShakeHands by convincing the world governments declare it a terrorist organization and recruits Enzo's partner Ling to aid him in his rise to power. Albert is shown to be gay, depicted in his debut episode alongside his boyfriend, a photographer named Tickey Pasco. He is voiced by Kenjiro Tsuda in Japanese, and by Kaiser Johnson in English.

== Antagonists ==
- Paikaru (パイカル, Paikaru), "Pycal" in the anime's English subtitles, is a magician who uses tricks to pass as an invulnerable pyrokineticist in chapter seven of the original manga. Lupin is recruited to protect a woman from Paikaru, but fails due to the magician's bulletproof body and flame-throwing finger. However, she hands what the magician seeks off to Lupin, leading to a final showdown between the two. This story was adapted into episode two of the first anime series and the character also appears in the OVAs Return of Pycal and Is Lupin Still Burning?.
- The Rat Clan (ネズミ一族, Nezumi Ichizoku) are a criminal organization who oppose Lupin in several chapters of the manga. They first appear in chapter 31 trying to assassinate Lupin. Fujiko is seen working with them on several occasions. They also appear in episodes 3 and 21 of Lupin the 3rd Part 5.
- Linda (リンダ, Rinda) and Rachika (ラチカ) are sisters in chapter 32 of the manga who have been trying to kill each other for some time. Each has part of a treasure map tattooed on their back, which the other needs to locate the treasure. This story was adapted into episode 31 of the second anime, with Linda renamed Anita (アニタ) and Rachika's name Romanized as "Latica" in the English dub.
- Kyosuke Mamou (魔毛 狂介, Mamō Kyōsuke) is a man from the future who travels through time in a time machine he created. In chapter 80 he attempts to kill Lupin III and every Lupin who ever existed because his father was killed by Lupin the 33rd. This story was adapted into episode 13 of the first anime and the character also appears in The Elusiveness of the Fog TV special and Is Lupin Still Burning?.
- Ataginez (タガニーゼ, Taganīze) is a classical music conductor and composer who tries to kill Lupin, Jigen and Goemon. He is the main antagonist of chapters 108 and 109 of the original manga. His conducting in the composition "The Funeral March of Lupin III" gives his assassins orders on how to attack and kill Lupin. Ataginez turns out to be Zenigata in disguise; his name being the detective's in reverse. This story was adapted into episode 79 of the second anime with the character named Kyoransky Momanitt (モーマニット・キョウランスキー, Mōmanitto Kyōransukī), the conductor of The International Philharmonic Orchestra, although he is not Zenigata in disguise. He is able to hypnotize people with his diamond studded conductor's baton, and holds a particular grudge against Lupin.
- Mister X (ミスターX, Misutā Ekkusu) is the leader of an evil and resourceful organization called Scorpion. Since his debut in the first episode of the first anime, he is obsessed with killing Lupin. He returns in the first episode of the second anime as a cyborg, and as a Lupin look alike in a later episode.
- Doctor Zell (ドクター・ゼル, Dokutā Zeru) is a Nazi experimental scientist and the main antagonist of episodes 50 and 51 of the second anime.
- Fantômas Mark III (ファントマ・マークIII, Fantomu Māku III) is the grandson of the criminal mastermind Fantômas. In episode 53 of the second anime his organization tries to flood the world by melting the South Pole ice cap. He returns in episode 73 of the same series to try to get revenge on Lupin.
- The Mysterious Gang of Five (謎の五人衆, Nazo no Goninshū) are a group of five Japanese thieves who decide to steal from Lupin and his gang. They are the main antagonists of episodes 55 and 56 of the second anime.
- Mamo (マモー, Mamō) is an ancient being of immense knowledge and wealth, bent on discovering the secret of eternal life. He is the main antagonist of The Mystery of Mamo film. He also appears briefly in the films Jigen's Gravestone and The Immortal Bloodline.
- Count Lazare d'Cagliostro (グラフ・ラザール・ド・カリオストロ, Gurafu Razāru do Kariosutoro), titled the Count Cagliostro (カリオストロ伯爵, Kariosutoro Hakushaku), is the main antagonist of The Castle of Cagliostro film. He is based on a real life count of the same name, who lived during the French Revolution and was thought to set the civil war off.
- Count Luis Yu Almeida (ルイス・勇・アルメイダ伯爵, Ruisu Isamu Arumeida Hakushaku) is an owl-inspired mad scientist who owns the Fiction 500 pharmaceutical organization, Glaucus Pharmaceuticals. Along with Owl of Minerva and Aisha he is the main antagonist of The Woman Called Fujiko Mine.
- Nyx (ニクス, Nikusu) is an MI6 agent trained in hand-to-hand combat and made to experience echolocation in order to better track down wanted criminals. His real name is Justin Person and is married with three children. While he begins as an antagonist, he later betrays MI6 in order to defeat the reincarnated Leonardo da Vinci. He primarily appeared in Lupin the 3rd Part IV.
- Leonardo da Vinci (レオナルド・ダ・ヴィンチ, Reonarudo da Vinchi) is the primary antagonist of Lupin the 3rd Part IV. He is a fully formed clone of the great Italian Renaissance thinker created by MI6. Utilizing his famous inventions and intellect combined with the technology of the modern era, he seeks to bring about a new stage of humanity. His goal is to collect the "New Apostles", a group of individuals he sees as representative of humanity's strengths.
- Enzo Bron (エンゾ・ブロン, Enzo Buron) is the primary antagonist of Lupin the 3rd Part 5. As the founder of the Shake Handz Corporation and CEO of social media platform PeopleLog, he oversees the operation of tracking down Lupin using the site's users as his evidence collectors. The site claims to know a person's entire life story and can be used to track people and reveal their secrets. Initially, the goal of PeopleLog was to find his daughter Ami, but this changes to finding Lupin as a test of the app's ability. His ultimate goal is to reveal the secrets of hundreds of heads of state, throwing the world into chaos and wiping entire countries off the map.
