= List of Lupin the 3rd Part I episodes =

Lupin the 3rd Part I (ルパン三世, Rupan Sansei) is the first TV anime adaptation of Monkey Punch's manga series of the same name.

== Production ==
The series was produced by Yomiuri Telecasting Corporation and Tokyo Movie, with character designs by Yasuo Ōtsuka, it was directed originally by Masaaki Ōsumi and later by Hayao Miyazaki and Isao Takahata under the name "A Productions". It aired on Yomiuri Telecasting Corporation in two seasons from October 24, 1971, to March 26, 1972, the first 11 episodes being of the first season and the latter 12 of the second.

The series centers on the adventures of Arsène Lupin III, the grandson of Arsène Lupin, the gentleman thief of Maurice Leblanc's series of novels. He is joined by Daisuke Jigen, Lupin's closest ally; Fujiko Mine, the femme fatale and Lupin's love interest who works against Lupin more often than with him; and Goemon Ishikawa XIII, a master swordsman and a descendant of Ishikawa Goemon, the legendary Japanese bandit. Lupin is often chased by Inspector Zenigata of the Tokyo Metropolitan Police, a descendant of Zenigata Heiji. A rather cynical detective, Zenigata has made it his life's mission to chase Lupin across the globe in hopes of arresting him.

When Miyazaki and Takahata took over directing duties from Ōsumi, they changed the tone of the series, adding more humor and making Lupin more family friendly, setting the blueprint for all subsequent Lupin animations (with the exception of The Mystery of Mamo and the 2012 TV series). A pilot film, also directed by Ōsumi, was made in 1969 prior to this anime, footage from the pilot is used in the opening sequences. Several of the early episodes take their plotlines from chapters of the original manga, namely episodes 2 and 4–6. The show has three opening theme songs and one ending song. Charlie Kosei sings the first two openings, "Lupin III Theme Song" (ルパン三世主題歌, Rupan Sansei Sono) (originally known as "Lupin the Third's Song" (ルパン・ザ・サードの歌, Rupan za Sādo no Uta)) (eps. 1–3, 9) and "Afro Lupin '68" (eps. 4–8, 10–15), and the ending, "Lupin III Theme Song II" (ルパン三世主題歌II, Rupan Sansei Sono 2), while the last opening is "Lupin III Theme Song 3" (ルパン三世 主題歌3, Rupan Sansei Sono 3) (eps. 16–23) by Yoshiro Hiroishi.

The first Lupin III TV series was released in Japan in a DVD box set by VAP on October 14, 2001, and on five separate individual discs on April 3, 2002. It was included in the Lupin the Box - TV & the movie - box set that was released on March 14, 2007, which also contained the second and third TV series and the first three theatrical films, and was released in a Blu-ray box set on December 12, 2008. On July 12, 2011, Discotek announced they licensed the entire TV series for a North American DVD release on June 26, 2012. The episodes are subtitled, several have optional English commentary by Lupin fans, and the release also includes extensive liner notes on each episode and both versions of the 1969 pilot film.

== Episodes ==
No.	Title	Directed by	Written by	Storyboarded by	Original air date
1	"Is Lupin Burning...?!"; Transliteration: "Rupan wa Moeteiru ka...?!" (Japanese: ルパンは燃えているか...?!)	Masaaki Ōsumi	Tadaaki Yamazaki	Sōji Yoshikawa	October 24, 1971
Lupin accepts an invitation to race at the newly completed Hida Speedway, fully aware the race track was constructed by the criminal organization Scorpion as a plot to kill him. Fujiko breaks into Scorpion's headquarters in an attempt to spy on them, but is captured. As the race begins, Lupin is tailed by Zenigata, and Scorpion set off traps which Lupin evades. In the middle of the race, Jigen stealthily switches places with Lupin on the race track. Lupin then infiltrates Scorpion's headquarters disguised as a plumber, floods the entire building, electrocutes all the Scorpion members therein (including their leader, Mr. X), frees Fujiko, rejoins the race, and wins. After being handed a trophy rigged to detonate, he tosses it back to those who gave it to him, flees in his race car, and blows up the race cars of those who followed him. Zenigata confronts Lupin, showing him that he captured Jigen and that Fujiko has sold them out in exchange for immunity. Lupin escapes nonetheless, showing up in the backseat of Fujiko's car as she drives away.
2	"The Man They Called a Magician"; Transliteration: "Majutsushi to Yobareta Otoko" (Japanese: 魔術師と呼ばれた男)	Masaaki Ōsumi	Atsushi Yamatoya	Seiji Okuda	October 31, 1971
Fujiko seeks Lupin and Jigen's help in fleeing from a man named Pycal, from whom she has stolen three frames containing the formula for a substance that makes anything coated in it bulletproof and heatproof. Pycal pursues Fujiko in an attempt to retrieve the frames, and coats himself in the substance in order to make Lupin and Jigen unable to kill him, while also using a mini-flamethrower hidden under his clothes in order to shoot fire from his finger, and using a well-placed sheet of high-density glass to appear levitating. After Lupin and Jigen fight and fail to kill Pycal twice, Lupin discovers the secrets behind Pycal's tricks, manufactures the substance for himself, destroys the frames, coats himself and Jigen in the substance, and confronts Pycal as his coat wears off, using a replica of his flamethrower to set him ablaze.
3	"Farewell, My Beloved Witch"; Transliteration: "Saraba Itoshiki Majo" (Japanese: さらば愛しき魔女)	Masaaki Ōsumi	Kiyoshi Miyata	Kuyou Sai	November 7, 1971
A boat collision ruins Lupin and Fujiko's quiet boating expedition. They discover a woman named Linda in the other boat just as gunmen on a larger boat attack them. After avoiding the gunboat, they learn that Linda is the assistant to a world-renowned expert on nuclear fission. She lived on an island with the doctor, which also housed the "Kirein Killers" ("Killers of the Sea"). Lupin and Jigen try to storm the island to save the Doctor and discover Linda's mysterious secret.
4	"One Chance for a Prison Break"; Transliteration: "Datsugoku no Chansu wa Ichido" (Japanese: 脱獄のチャンスは一度)	Masaaki Ōsumi	Tōru Sawaki	Masahiro Sasaki	November 14, 1971
Lupin, Jigen, and Fujiko's heist is foiled when Zenigata manages to capture Lupin and haul him off to prison. Over the course of a year, Jigen repeatedly stops Fujiko's attempts to break Lupin out of prison, claiming Lupin can escape whenever he wants. On the day of Lupin's execution, Jigen goes undercover as a priest to learn why Lupin is refusing to escape and attempt to help him. Lupin refuses Jigen's help, and reveals he is betting his life in a ploy to humiliate Zenigata. Shortly thereafter, he makes his escape.
5	"The Coming of Goemon the 13th" Transliteration: "Jūsan-dai Goemon Tōjō" (Japanese: 十三代五ェ門登場)	Masaaki Ōsumi	Tadaaki Yamazaki	Tameo Kohanawa	November 21, 1971
Goemon Ishikawa XIII is the thirteenth direct descendant of the famous samurai highwayman Ishikawa Goemon. Goemon's mentor has given him a mission; find Lupin and use the invincible Zantetsuken to eliminate him. Neither Goemon nor Lupin know that Goemon's mentor and Fujiko are actually working together.
6	"Rainy Afternoons are Dangerous!"; Transliteration: "Ame no Gogo wa Yabai ze" (Japanese: 雨の午後はヤバイゼ)	Masaaki Ōsumi	Seiji Matsuoka	Kenzo Koizumi	November 28, 1971
One rainy afternoon, a man seeks Lupin's help on behalf of a young woman. The woman is actually Fujiko, who is after a diamond known as "The Star of Kilimanjaro". The diamond was implanted into the chest of a mob boss. This boss had his memory wiped but died days before it was to be restored. To complicate matters further, the body is scheduled to burn in a few hours. Now, Lupin and the gang are after the ambulance carrying the corpse and the diamond in it to the cemetery. Zenigata, intent on performing an autopsy before the body is burned, is in charge of the ambulance and its escort, and he attempts to prevent Lupin from stealing the diamond.
7	"One Wolf Calls Another"; Transliteration: "Ōkami wa Ōkami o Yobu" (Japanese: 狼は狼を呼ぶ)	Uncredited: Masaaki Ōsumi; A Production (Hayao Miyazaki, Isao Takahata)	Atsushi Yamatoya	Kuyou Sai	December 5, 1971
Three scrolls contain the secret of creating a blade like the Zantetsuken, Goemon's signature weapon. Lupin wants to steal them as a matter of family pride because his grandfather, Arsene Lupin, stole them back in the 19th century. Lupin's father stole a dagger from a swordsman that was forged using the same process. The swordsman challenged Lupin II to a duel and lost. But, he managed to steal the scrolls for himself. Now, Lupin plans to steal the scrolls back, but to do so, he must face Goemon and Fujiko, who have their own plans for acquiring the scrolls.
8	"The Gang's-All-Here Playing Card Strategy"; Transliteration: "Zenin Shūgō Toranpu Sakusen" (Japanese: 全員集合トランプ作戦)	Uncredited: Masaaki Ōsumi; A Production (Hayao Miyazaki, Isao Takahata)	Kiyoshi Miyata	Seiji Okuda	December 12, 1971
Lupin warns a rich man known as Mr. Gold that he plans to steal a deck of cards that once belonged to Napoleon from him during Mr. Gold's birthday party at the stroke of midnight. That night, Mr. Gold goes ahead with the party regardless, while his private police force—along with local police led by Zenigata—wait for Lupin to make his move. When the clock strikes midnight, Lupin steals the cards and makes his escape. Afterwards, Mr. Gold's forces make attempt after attempt to retrieve the cards and capture Lupin, with Lupin—aided by Jigen, Fujiko, and Goemon—thwarting them each time. Note: This episode borrows several plot points and set pieces from the Pilot Film.
9	"A Hitman Sings the Blues"; Transliteration: "Koroshiya wa Burūsu o Utau" (Japanese: 殺し屋はブルースを歌う)	Masaaki Ōsumi	Tōru Sawaki	Seiji Okuda	December 19, 1971
Lupin and company aim to steal classified documents concerning a computer chip worth millions of dollars, guarded by the machine gun wielding Cap, and Poon—Fujiko's former mob partner. They succeed in their mission, with Poon and Fujiko meeting in the process, and Cap shooting Fujiko as she escapes. As Fujiko is treated for her injuries, Jigen tells Lupin of her and Poon's shared past. Thereafter, Cap and Poon arrive to reclaim the documents, injuring Jigen and kidnapping Fujiko in the process, with Lupin pursuing them as they make their escape. Trapping their adversaries in their hideout, Lupin calls in help to rescue Fujiko so she can receive treatment. After failing to negotiate Fujiko's return, Lupin uses unorthodox tactics to retrieve her himself. Poon tries to stop him, but Fujiko shoots Poon dead before he can.
10	"Target the Cash Counterfeiter!"; Transliteration: "Nisesatsutsukuri wo Nerae!" (Japanese: ニセ札つくりを狙え!)	Uncredited: Masaaki Ōsumi; A Production (Hayao Miyazaki, Isao Takahata)	Tōru Sawaki	Norio Yazawa	December 26, 1971
Lupin and Jigen steal a case of counterfeit money from two criminals, but judging the bills low-quality forgeries, Lupin decides to fly over a nearby city and dump the case. Finding what Lupin has done, the source of the counterfeits, one "Baron Ukraine", hires Fujiko to deal with Lupin. She informs him that Lupin is pursuing his aunt, the legendary counterfeiter known as the "Silver Fox of Ukraine". Both Lupin and the Baron (along with his men), repeatedly attempt to infiltrate the Silver Fox's clock tower base and take her counterfeiting partner Ivanov for themselves. All their attempts fail, ending in the deaths of most of the Baron's men, the Baron himself, and the Silver Fox. Additionally, Fujiko reveals she was playing both sides off of each other, before going back to retrieve Ivanov herself, leaving Lupin and Flinch (the Baron's last remaining man) to beat each other up in the snow. After laying the Silver Fox of Ukraine to rest, Ivanov blows up the clock tower. Note: Several plot points and set pieces from this episode would later be incorporated into the 1979 film The Castle of Cagliostro.
11	"When the Seventh Bridge Falls"; Transliteration: "Nanabanme no Hashi ga Ochiru Toki" (Japanese: 7番目の橋が落ちるとき)	Uncredited: A Production (Hayao Miyazaki, Isao Takahata)	Seiji Matsuoka	Tameo Kohanawa	January 2, 1972
Someone posing as Lupin blows up five bridges within a week, causing dozens of casualties. Lupin and Jigen determine the bomber is trying to force a bank-owned armoured car to travel down a specific route. Determining the bomber's next target, they track him down. However, he captures Lupin and Jigen, and threatens the life of a kidnapped girl named Lisa if they don't help him rob the armoured car. They agree, and the robbery goes off just as planned. As Lupin hands off the money, the bomber feigns leaving Lisa behind, but throws her into his getaway boat before Lupin has the chance to stop him. Lupin pursues the boat, killing the bomber in the process, before escaping and leaving Lisa to explain the details to the police.
12	"Who Had the Last Laugh?"; Transliteration: "Dare ga Saigo ni Waratta ka?" (Japanese: 誰が最後に笑ったか?)	Uncredited: Masaaki Ōsumi; A Production (Hayao Miyazaki, Isao Takahata)	Kazuichi Tsurumi	Tameo Kohanawa	January 9, 1972
Fujiko is racing against a criminal organization to acquire a pair of gold statues that are owned by a snowbound village in the mountains. Lupin makes plans to acquire the statues, as well. The village elder considers selling the statues in an effort to help his village. Note: This was Masaaki Ōsumi's last episode in this series. Hayao Miyazaki and Isao Takahata would later direct the rest of the episodes. In 1993, Masaaki Ōsumi would then later direct Lupin the 3rd: Voyage to Danger.
13	"Beware the Time Machine!"; Transliteration: "Taimumashin ni Ki wo Tsukete!" (Japanese: タイムマシンに気をつけろ!)	Uncredited: Masaaki Ōsumi; A Production (Hayao Miyazaki, Isao Takahata)	Kiyoshi Miyata	Kuyou Sai	January 16, 1972
Kyosuke Mamoh claims that Lupin will disappear from the world in four days. He claims that he is a time traveller from 2874 seeking revenge. Apparently, Lupin XIII destroyed the Mamo clan on March 22, 2874. Mamoh has travelled back in time to destroy Lupin III and prevent his clan's future destruction. Mamoh backs his claims up by travelling into the past and killing the builder of a castle causing it to disappear in front of Lupin's eyes.
14	"The Emerald's Secret"; Transliteration: "Emerarudo no Himitsu" (Japanese: エメラルドの秘密)	Uncredited: A Production (Hayao Miyazaki, Isao Takahata)	Kiyoshi Miyata	Minoru Okazaki	January 23, 1972
Lupin and Fujiko each separately sneak onto the Queen of Hollywood's yacht during her wedding, in order to steal her prized emerald, the "Eye of the Nile". Fujiko disguises herself as the Queen of Hollywood's handmaiden, while Lupin hides inside the wedding cake, and Zenigata waits to intercept Lupin. Before the ceremony, Fujiko swaps the gem with a look-alike. As the cake is cut, Lupin steals the emerald off the Queen of Hollywood, not knowing it is a fake. When Zenigata and the guests notice its disappearance, the Queen of Hollywood strangely dismisses the matter, not wanting to ruin the reception. As Lupin goes to make his escape, Fujiko shows him that she stole the gem first, only to drop it, whereupon it shatters, showing that the gem the Queen of Hollywood was originally wearing was a decoy. The two then team up to find the real emerald. After repeatedly failing to locate it, the Queen of Hollywood reveals she knew of their scheming the whole time, but played along for the thrill. As Zenigata closes in on Lupin, Fujiko cuts the power, Lupin swipes the real emerald, and they make their escape.
15	"Let's Catch Lupin and Go to Europe"; Transliteration: "Rupan wo Tsukamaete Yōroppa e Ikō" (Japanese: ルパンを捕まえてヨーロッパへ行こう)	Uncredited: A Production (Hayao Miyazaki, Isao Takahata)	Seiji Matsuoka	Tameo Kohanawa	January 30, 1972
Zenigata plans to catch Lupin in his next heist (to steal a gold bust from a local millionaire within the next three days) before heading off to an International Police conference in Europe. Upon learning of this, Lupin hatches a plan to be intentionally captured by Zenigata, whereupon Zenigata will board his flight, allowing Lupin to escape and steal the bust unhindered. Lupin and company execute the plan, waving goodbye to Zenigata as the plane takes off.
16	"Operation: Jewelry Snatch"; Transliteration: "Hōseki Yokodori Sakusen" (Japanese: 宝石横取り作戦)	A Production (Hayao Miyazaki, Isao Takahata)	Mon Shichijō	Satoshi Dezaki	February 6, 1972
Fujiko goads Lupin into stealing a large shipment of diamonds. Lupin takes the task despite Jigen's protest that Fujiko is playing them for fools. Of course, Jigen is right.
17	"Lupin, Caught in a Trap"; Transliteration: "Wana ni Kakatta Rupan" (Japanese: 罠にかかったルパン)	A Production (Hayao Miyazaki, Isao Takahata); Uncredited: Masaaki Ōsumi	Mon Shichijō	Kuyou Sai	February 13, 1972
Lupin and Jigen go out for a night of partying at a high-end club with Fujiko and her friend Ginko Hoshigake, the club's hostess. As the night winds down, however, Ginko attaches time bomb watches to the other three's wrists set to detonate in 24 hours, and demands a massive ransom for their lives. The three decide to break into a mint and print the money there, despite the plan being unfinished. As Zenigata and local police arrive, they escape on a large balloon with the money. Lupin and Jigen evade capture and stash the money in a warehouse. With the police on the hunt, the three ask Ginko to give them another three days to retrieve the money. Ginko agrees and removes the watches, but takes Fujiko hostage until then. After they retrieve the money, Fujiko reveals she was in on the plan and is taking a share of the ransom. However, Lupin plants a bomb on Ginko and Fujiko's car, which detonates shortly after they leave. They money remains unharmed, but is revealed to have been printed with Lupin's face on it, making it worthless.
18	"Keep an Eye on the Beauty Contest!"; Transliteration: "Bijin Kontesuto o Māku se yo" (Japanese: 美人コンテストをマークせよ)	A Production (Hayao Miyazaki, Isao Takahata)	Seiji Matsuoka	Tameo Kohanawa	February 20, 1972
Smith is an art thief that is selling stolen paintings under the guise of a beauty contest. While Smith hold the beauty contest, Lupin and his colleague take an action to steal the stolen paintings from Smith.
19	"Which Third-Generation Will Win?!"; Transliteration: "Dotchi ga Katsu ka Sandaime!" (Japanese: どっちが勝つか三代目!)	A Production (Hayao Miyazaki, Isao Takahata)	Shunichirō Koyama	Kazunori Tanahashi	February 27, 1972
Inspector Ganimard III is the grandson of Lupin I's archnemesis. He has come to Japan has the head of security for the 1972 France Fair but also intends to restore his family's honor by arresting Lupin III. Ganimard publicly baits Lupin into trying to steal the Fair's exhibits by insulting Lupin's family pride. Ganimard is convinced that reason and science will capture Lupin.
20	"Catch the Phony Lupin!"; Transliteration: "Nise Rupan o Tsukamaero!" (Japanese: ニセルパンを捕まえろ!)	A Production (Hayao Miyazaki, Isao Takahata)	Mon Shichijō	Tameo Kohanawa	March 5, 1972
Someone is committing thefts under Lupin's name. Lupin follows the imposters back to their island hideout. He has apparently stumbled into a whole island of thieves.
21	"Rescue the Shrewish Girl!"; Transliteration: "Jajaumamusume o Tasukedase!" (Japanese: ジャジャ馬娘を助けだせ!)	A Production (Hayao Miyazaki, Isao Takahata)	Seiji Matsuoka	Haruo Takahashi	March 12, 1972
Rie is being held captive though she does not realize it. She believes the man holding her is a friend of her father, Ken Makita. Lupin shows up to rescue her. Rie does not want to be rescued by Lupin and does not understand why he is trying to. Lupin's father was a friend of Rie's father. The "friend" is Jooji Takigawa; he is holding Rie hostage in an attempt to get her father out of retirement to do his bidding.
22	"The First-Move-Wins Computer Operation!"; Transliteration: "Sente Hisshō Konpyūtā Sakusen!" (Japanese: 先手必勝コンピューター作戦!)	A Production (Hayao Miyazaki, Isao Takahata)	Kiyoshi Miyata	Tameo Kohanawa	March 19, 1972
Gordon, an FBI computer specialist, is in Japan to operate a computer capable of predicting crimes and determining how to stop them. The Metropolitan Police Department hopes that this will finally help them capture Lupin. Zenigata is unimpressed and warns that the machine will not be able to stop Lupin. For once, Zenigata and Lupin see eye to eye. Lupin sets out to prove that the computer is no match for his intellect.
23	"The Big Golden Showdown!"; Transliteration: "Ōgon no Daishōbu!" (Japanese: 黄金の大勝負!)	A Production (Hayao Miyazaki, Isao Takahata)	Tatsuo Tamura	Sōji Yoshikawa	March 26, 1972
A disputed horde of recently discovered ancient gold coins draws the attention of Lupin and company. As the ownership of the coins is disputed, Lupin decides to settle the matter on his own by stealing them from the Dai Nippon Bank. This time, Zenigata decides not to wait for Lupin to carry out the hit but to counterattack by locating and raiding his hideout. After a dispute with his chief, he also offers him a letter of resignation in case of a further failure, and vows to stop Lupin on his own in one final showdown.

== See also ==
- Lupin III
- List of Lupin III Part II episodes
- List of Lupin III Part III episodes
- List of Lupin III: The Woman Called Fujiko Mine episodes
- List of Lupin III Part IV episodes
- List of Lupin III Part 5 episodes
- List of Lupin III Part 6 episodes
- List of Lupin III television specials
