= Mitsumori =

Mitsumori is a Japanese surname, masculine given name, and toponym.

== Kanji ==
Kanji used to write the name Mitsumori include:

- 三森: "three forests", "third forest". Also read Mimori, Mitsunomori, or Sanmori.
- 三守: "three protections", "third protection". Also read Mimori, Sanmori, or Tadamori.
- 三護: "three protections", "third protection".
- 光守: "bright protection".
- 光森: "bright forest". Also read Kōmori.
- 光盛: "bright and thriving". Also read Kōsei.
- 満森: "abundant forest"
- 満盛: "abundant and thriving"

== People ==
People and characters with the surname Mitsumori include:

- Yasuaki Mitsumori (三森 泰明; born 1946) Japanese volleyball player
- Yuka Mitsumori (三森 由佳; born 1972), Japanese racewalker, represented Japan at the 1996 Summer Olympics
- Dr. Mitsumori, a fictional character in the video game franchise Bomberman

== Places ==
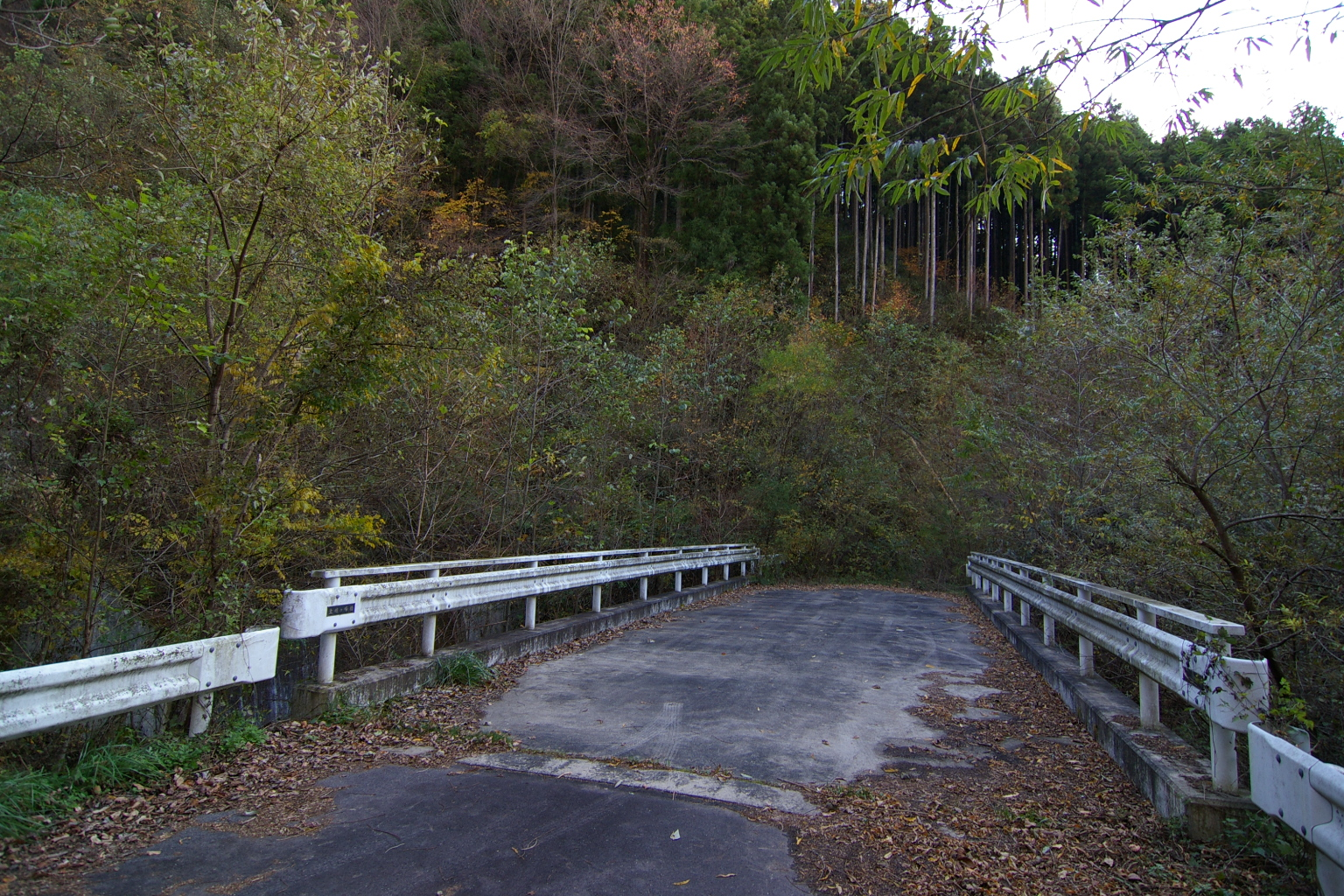
A road on Mount Mitsumori

There is a Mount Mitsumori (三森山) near Ena, Gifu.
