= Lupin the 3rd Part 5 =

Japanese anime television series

- Poster, featuring (left to right) Jigen, Fujiko, Lupin, Goemon, and Ami
- ルパン三世 PART5
- Based on: Lupin the 3rd by Monkey Punch
- Written by: Ichirō Ōkouchi
- Directed by: Daisuke Sakō (chief); Yūichirō Yano
- Music by: Yuji Ohno
- Country of origin: Japan
- Original language: Japanese
- No. of episodes: 24 + OVA (list of episodes)

Production
- Producers: Kōji Nozaki; Masaki Shiode
- Animator: Telecom Animation Film
- Production companies: TMS Entertainment Co., Ltd. (Note: Production) "Lupin the 3rd Part 5" Production Committee (Note: Production committee label consisting of TMS, Telecom, VAP and Nippon TV)

Original release
- Network: Nippon TV
- Release: April 4 – September 18, 2018

Lupin the 3rd Part 5 (Japanese: ルパン三世 PART5, Hepburn: Rupan Sansei Pāto Faibu) also known as Lupin the 3rd Part V: Misadventures in France, is a Japanese anime television series produced by TMS Entertainment and animated by Telecom Animation Film, directed by Yūichirō Yano, and written by Ichirō Ōkouchi. Part of the Lupin III franchise, it is the sixth anime television adaptation of the Lupin III manga series created by Monkey Punch.

The series aired from April 4 to September 18, 2018, on Nippon TV. It was simulcast with English subtitles by Crunchyroll, and later dubbed into English and premiered on Adult Swim's Toonami programming block on June 16, 2019. (Note: Adult Swim lists the series as premiering on June 15, 2019 at 1:00 a.m. EDT/PDT, which is effectively June 16.)

== Plot ==
The series is set in modern-day France and follows the thief Lupin III. In the first story arc of the series, he infiltrates a data center to steal digital currency from "Marco Polo", a site on the dark web, which sells illegal items such as drugs and weapons. The rest of the regular ensemble cast of Lupin the Third characters, the marksman Daisuke Jigen, the swordsman Goemon Ishikawa XIII, the con artist Fujiko Mine and Inspector Koichi Zenigata, are joined by the new character Ami Enan, a teenage hacker.

In the second arc, Lupin gains possession of a black notebook containing extremely sensitive information about high-level political figures, which makes him a target for the ruthless director of the DGES as well as for Albert d'Andrésy, a fiendishly cunning criminal and ex-partner of Lupin hiding under the façade of an honest government official.

In the third story arc, Lupin intends to steal the Bloody Teardrop, a national treasure of the Southeast Asian kingdom of Padar, which is currently worn by its royal princess Dolma, who has befriended Ami. When a revolution threatens Dolma's life, Ami reunites with Lupin to rescue her.

The fourth and final story arc sees a last reunion between Lupin and Ami against the Shake Hands Corporation, a shady IT conglomerate whose aim is world domination via an exclusive monopoly on cyber-trafficking and internet use, and which has been pulling the strings behind the scenes of some of Lupin's exploits in the series.

Recurring subthemes in the series include the use of contemporary high technology (particularly the Internet, facial recognition programs and surveillance drones), and the question of trust between Lupin and the rest of his gang.

== Voice cast ==
Character	Japanese voice actor	English voice actor
Lupin the 3rd	Kanichi Kurita	Tony Oliver
Daisuke Jigen	Kiyoshi Kobayashi	Richard Epcar
Goemon Ishikawa	Daisuke Namikawa	Lex Lang
Fujiko Mine	Miyuki Sawashiro	Michelle Ruff
Inspector Zenigata	Koichi Yamadera	Doug Erholtz
Ami Enan	Inori Minase	Cristina Valenzuela
Goro Yatagarasu	Nobunaga Shimazaki	Kaiji Tang
Albert d'Andrésy	Kenjirō Tsuda	Kaiser Johnson
Enzo Bron	Takaya Kamikawa	Jeff Schine

== Production ==
Lupin the 3rd Part V: Misadventures in France was produced at Telecom Animation Film, and was directed by Yūichirō Yano, reprising his role from 2015's Part IV. It was written by Ichirō Ōkouchi alongside Gō Zappa, Daisuke Sakō, Kazushige Nojima, Takahiro Okura, Yuniko Ayana, Keiichi Sigsawa and Shatner Nishida, and featured character designs by Hisao Yokobori. The series was announced at Japan Expo in Paris in 2017, and aired for 24 episodes from April 4, 2018 (Note: The series is billed as premiering on April 3, 2018 at "25:29", which is effectively April 4 at 1:29 a.m. JST.) to September 18, 2018, on Nippon TV's AnichU programming block and other networks. It is also streamed by Hulu in Japan, and simulcast by Crunchyroll in Japanese with English subtitles. It will be released on home video in the United Kingdom and Ireland by Anime Limited. It also aired on Adult Swim's Toonami programming block in the United States starting on June 16, 2019. In June 2021, Discotek Media announced their North American license to the series. They release the series in a Blu-ray box set on October 26, 2021.

The first Japanese DVD/Blu-ray set containing the first five episodes of the anime was released on July 25, 2018. It includes a memorial episode titled "Is Lupin Still Burning?" to celebrate the 50th anniversary of the manga. The episode was directed by Jun Kawagoe, with Monkey Punch as general director and character designs by Hisao Horikoshi and Satoshi Hirayama. Its title is a reference to the debut episode of the first Lupin the Third anime series and follows its story, but features other enemies such as Kyosuke Mamo, Sandayu Momochi, Pycal, and Stoneman. An English dub of the original video animation premiered on Adult Swim on the Toonami block on December 15, 2019, a week after the conclusion of Part V's run.

== Reception ==
Anime News Network's Rose Bridges and Jacob Chapman each included Lupin the 3rd Part V on their list of The Best Anime of 2018. Bridges wrote that while less "newbie-friendly" than Part IV, it surpasses its predecessor by being more focused and "freewheeling," constantly keeping viewers on their toes.
