= Kōsei =

Kōsei, Kosei or Kousei may refer to:

== Places ==
- Kōsei, Shiga, a former town in Kōka District, Shiga, Japan

== Transport ==
- Kosei Line, a railway line in Japan
- Kōsei Station, a train station in Konan, Shiga, Japan

== People ==
- Charlie Kosei (born 1950), Japanese musician
- Kosei Akaishi (赤石 光生, born 1965), Japanese sport wrestler
- Kosei Egawa (恵川 光生), Japanese Paralympic swimmer
- Kosei Gushiken (born 1942), Japanese triple jumper
- Kōsei Hirota (born 1951), Japanese voice actor
- Kosei Inoue (born 1978), Japanese judoka
- Kosei Ishigami (石神 幸征, born 1990), Japanese footballer
- Kosei Kitauchi (born 1974), Japanese football player
- Kosei Nakamura (中村 幸聖, born 1981), Japanese footballer
- Kosei Ono (born 1987), Japanese rugby player
- Kosei Shibasaki (born 1984), Japanese football player
- Kōsei Tomita (born 1936, dead 2020), Japanese voice actor
- Kosei Yamaguchi (山口 浩勢, born 1991), Japanese long-distance runner

== See also ==
- Kosei Maru (disambiguation)
