= Tadamori =

Tadamori is a Japanese surname and masculine given name.

== Kanji ==
Kanji used to write the name Tadamori include:

- 多田森: "forest with many fields"
- 理森: "manages the forest"
- 忠盛: "loyal and flourishing"
- 三守: "three protections", "third protection". Also read Mimori, Mitsumori, or Sanmori.

== Given name ==
People with this given name include:

- Taira no Tadamori (平 忠盛; 1096–1153), samurai of the Taira Clan
- Tadamori Oshima (大島 理森; born 1946), Japanese politician with the Liberal Democratic Party

== See also ==
- 4374 Tadamori, a minor planet
