= Kiyoshi Kobayashi =

Japanese actor and voice actor (1933–2022)

- 小林 清志
- Born: January 11, 1933; Bunkyō, Tokyo City, Japan
- Died: July 30, 2022 (aged 89); Tokyo, Japan
- Other name: Kobakiyo (コバキヨ)
- Occupations: Actor, voice actor, narrator
- Years active: 1958–2022
- Agent: Haikyō
- Height: 168 cm (5 ft 6 in)
- Website: Official profile

Kiyoshi Kobayashi (小林 清志, Kobayashi Kiyoshi; January 11, 1933 – July 30, 2022) was a Japanese actor, voice actor and narrator from Tokyo. He was attached to the Tokyo Actor's Consumer's Cooperative Society. He was a graduate of the arts department of Nihon University.

He was best known for his role as Daisuke Jigen in the Lupin the Third series, voicing the character for over 50 years. He also voiced roles in Humanoid Monster Bem (as Bem), the Droopy cartoons (as the Wolf) and Shazzan (as Shazzan); Kobayashi was the official dub-over voice of James Coburn and Lee Marvin for Japan.

== History ==
Since junior high school, Kobayashi had excelled in English and had vague aspirations of becoming a writer in the future. After graduating from high school, he took the entrance examination for the University of Tokyo, but failed because he took the French literature course instead of the English literature course due to the trend at the time, and also failed in his re-take the following year. Therefore, he was still open for admission after that notice and thought, "If I am going to be a writer, I might as well learn how others live," and with a light heart he entered the theater department of Nihon University's College of Art. After entering the school, Kobayashi was captivated by the theater and naturally began his career as an actor.

After graduating from college, Kobayashi joined the theater company Izumi-za and worked as a stage actor. His translation of the stage play "The Caine Mutiny" was well received, and he began working part-time as a translator for Japanese Dubbing. Later, Kobayashi was invited by Banjiro Uemura, president of the dubbing production company Tohokushinsha Film, who said, "You are an actor, aren't you?", which led him to start his own dubbing business, and he began working as a voice actor.

Kobayashi was initially busy translating at the rate of two translations a month along with his voice acting work, and he was so busy that in the 1962 TV series "This Man Dawson," he took on the role of a translator at the same time he played the lead role in the series for the first time. After that, his translation work gradually declined, and when Izumiza dissolved spontaneously around 1971, he concentrated on his voice acting career.

Kobayashi's distinctive low-baritone voice made him active in the voice acting industry in Japan from its earliest days. In dubbing, he was the exclusive voice of James Coburn and Lee Marvin, and also dubbed Tommy Lee Jones, Jack Palance, and Franco Nero in many films. He also appeared in many animation and narrated many TV shows.

Kobayashi had his own particular preoccupations and aesthetics regarding his work, such as "not using a microphone pop filter" and "eating a piece of caramel before recording". Kobayashi was also known as a heavy smoker, and an anecdote has it that the studio where he recorded was so full of smoke that he could not be seen (Since the 2010s, he has refrained from smoking in public to keep up with the changing times, but his popularity has led some studios to give him special permission to smoke.).

He dubbed James Coburn in most of his films for about 40 years after he was hired because of "His mouth looks like Coburn's.". Kobayashi said that dubbing Coburn was "the first role I ever held" and "a role I could do naturally". When Coburn died, he commented, "He had gained a new charm in his old age and thought he would be even more successful as an actor...., I have a strange, unsettled feeling, as if a member of my immediate family had passed away.".

In 2021, he retired from his role as the voice of Daisuke Jigen, after over 50 years of service. However, he continued to appear in other productions and narrations, and he remained active for the rest of his life.

His talent management agency Haikyo announced that he died on July 30, 2022, due to pneumonia.

== Daisuke Jigen ==
Kobayashi played the role of Daisuke Jigen in the anime series Lupin the Third for more than 50 years, from the pilot version in 1969 to the first episode of Part 6 in 2021.

According to the author, Monkey Punch, the model for Jigen's character was James Coburn, who appeared in the movie The Magnificent Seven. Based on this image, Kobayashi, who dubbed Coburn, was chosen to play the role of Jigen. Therefore, unlike the other four central characters, Kobayashi was the only candidate for the role of Jigen.

When several members of the main cast were replaced in 2011, including Koichi Zenigata, the role of Jigen was initially scheduled to be replaced as well, but Kobayashi was retained because "we just couldn't find anyone suitable for the role". At the same time as this changeover, he became known as "the only original cast member".

Since the 1990s, he has often played roles that pay homage to Jigen in other works. He has also been told by those around him that he "looks like Jigen himself," even when he is not consciously aware of it, to which he expressed his delight, saying, "It's a gratifying story for an actor to hear".

Kobayashi described Jigen as "the culmination of himself and synonymous with himself," and often said in interviews that "he is like an alter ego". Also, Kobayashi said, "It's a bit presumptuous of me." but he also said, "Because I play the role, he becomes Daisuke Jigen." and that he played the role with a strong sense of pride.

In the fall of 2021, Kobayashi decided to leave his beloved Jigen, citing the 50th anniversary of the anime series broadcast and his advanced age. He was replaced by Akio Otsuka, known for dubbing Denzel Washington and voicing Solid Snake in the Metal Gear series, and whose father Chikao Ohtsuka voiced Goemon in Lupin the 3rd Part I. "Episode 0", the first episode of the TV series Lupin the 3rd Part 6, was Kobayashi's last performance as Jigen.

Kobayashi left the Lupin series with the following message.

(Original)

ルパンは俺にとって一生ものの仕事であった。命をかけてきた。
我儘を言えば90歳までやっていたかったが残念。
何とかかじりついていたかったが 無理だった。
歳をとればそれなりの深みが出てくるはずだ。ただ映像とのギャップがあるか。

話は違うが以前、明夫ちゃんに聞かれたことがある。
「なぜ親父は五ェ門を辞めたんでしょう？」と。
親父とは大塚周夫先輩である。答えに窮したことがある。
さぞ先輩も 無念だったにちがいない。
一部の方々から言われる事があるのは、次元は歳をとった 聞きづらい。
当たり前だ わたしゃ 齢88歳であるぞ。俺なりに努力した結果だ。
これからはそう言われることを気にしないですむ。ほっとしている。

あとは明夫ちゃんに委ねます。
頑張ってちょうだい。
ただ、次元はそんじょそこらの悪党とは違うぞ。
江戸のイキというもんだ。変な話だが、次元は江戸っ子だ。
明夫ちゃん、これは難しいぞ。
雰囲気はJAZZにも似ているんだ。

最後に
これまで応援してくれた人たちにお礼を申し上げる。ありがとうございました。

ルパン。俺はそろそろずらかるぜ。
あばよ。

— 小林清志,

(Translation)
Lupin has been a life-long job for me. I've put my life on the line.
Selfishly, I would have liked to have done it until I was 90, but alas.
I wanted to hang on to it somehow, but I couldn't.
As I get older, I should have a certain "depth" to it. However, I wonder if there will be a gap between voice and the images.

On a different note, Akio-chan once asked me.
"Why did dad quit as Goemon?" And.
The "dad" is Chikao Ohtsuka Senpai. I was at a loss for an answer.
Perhaps Chikao Senpai must have been disappointed.

Recently, some people have said to me, "Jigen is getting old.", "His voice is hard to hear.".
Duh, I am 88 years old. The result of my own efforts.
……From now on, I don't have to worry about being told so. I am relieved.

I will leave the rest to Akio-chan.
Good luck.
But Jigen is not your average villain.
He has "Attitude of Edo". It may sound strange, but Jigen is an "Edokko".
Akio-chan, this is a tough one.
Also, his feeling is similar to "Jazz".

In closing
I would like to thank all those who have supported me so far. Thank you very much.

Lupin, I'm about to get outta here.
Bye.

— Kiyoshi Kobayashi,

== Filmography ==
=== Television animation ===
- Basilisk (2005) (Kouga Danjo)
- Case Closed/Detective Conan (1996) (Suwa Yuji (Ep. 16))
- Dirty Pair (1985) (Blues) (ep 20)
- Humanoid Monster Bem (1968) (Bem)
- La Seine no Hoshi (1975) (Zarar)
- Star of the Giants (1968) (Armstrong Ozuma)
- Space Cobra (1982) (Crystal Bowie)
- The King of Braves GaoGaiGar (1997) (Narrator)
- The King of Braves GaoGaiGar Final -Grand Glorious Gathering- (2005) (Narrator, Ryōsuke Takanohashi)
- Death Note (2006) (Watari/Quillsh Wammy)
- Lupin the Third: The Woman Called Fujiko Mine (2012) (Daisuke Jigen)
- Lupin the 3rd Part I (1971) (Daisuke Jigen)
- Lupin the 3rd Part II (1977) (Daisuke Jigen)
- Lupin the 3rd Part III (1984) (Daisuke Jigen)
- Lupin the 3rd Part IV (2015) (Daisuke Jigen)
- Lupin the 3rd Part V (2018) (Daisuke Jigen)
- Lupin the 3rd Part 6 (2021) (Daisuke Jigen) (episode 0 only)

=== OVA ===
- Megazone 23 (1985) (Eigen Yumekanou)
- Violence Jack: Hell Town (1988) (Jack)
- Legend of the Galactic Heroes (1988) (Adrian Rubinsky)
- Mobile Suit Gundam 0083: Stardust Memory (1991) (Aiguille Delaz)
- JoJo's Bizarre Adventure (1993) (Muhammad Avdol)
- Queen Emeraldas (1998) (Captain)
- The King of Braves GaoGaiGar Final (2000) (Narrator, Ryōsuke Takanohashi)
- Lupin III: Return of the Magician (2002) (Daisuke Jigen)
- Amuri in Star Ocean (2008) (Deus Allen, Ukatan)
- Lupin III: Green Vs. Red (2008) (Daisuke Jigen)

=== Animated films ===
- Mazinger Z vs. Devilman (1973) (Mashogun Zannin)
- Lupin III: The Mystery of Mamo (1978) (Daisuke Jigen)
- Lupin III: The Castle of Cagliostro (1979) (Daisuke Jigen)
- Twelve Months (1980) (January)
- Crusher Joe (1983) (Talos)
- Golgo 13: The Professional (1983) (T. Jefferson)
- Lupin III: Legend of the Gold of Babylon (1985) (Daisuke Jigen)
- Mobile Suit Gundam F91 (1991) (Gillet Krueger)
- Doraemon: Nobita and the Kingdom of Clouds (1992) (Earthling A)
- Lupin III: Farewell to Nostradamus (1995) (Daisuke Jigen)
- Lupin III: Dead or Alive (1996) (Daisuke Jigen)
- Case Closed: The Phantom of Baker Street (2002) (James Moriarty)
- Doraemon: Nobita and the Windmasters (2003) (Uranda)
- Crayon Shin-chan: The Storm Called: The Kasukabe Boys of the Evening Sun (2004) (Justice Love)
- Space Pirate Captain Harlock (2013) (Old man)
- Lupin the 3rd vs. Detective Conan: The Movie (2013) (Daisuke Jigen)
- Lupin the IIIrd: Jigen's Gravestone (2014) (Daisuke Jigen)
- Lupin the IIIrd: Goemon Ishikawa's Spray of Blood (2017) (Daisuke Jigen)
- Lupin the IIIrd: Fujiko Mine's Lie (2019) (Daisuke Jigen)
- Lupin III: The First (2019) (Daisuke Jigen)

=== Tokusatsu ===
- Kousoku Esper (1967) (Alien Giron)
- Spectreman (1971) (Dr. Gori)
- Kaiketsu Lion-Maru (1972) (Daimaou Gohsun)
- Zone Fighter (1973) (Narrator)
- Enban Senso Bankid (1976) (Guzale Commander)
- UFO Daisensou: Tatakae Red Tiger (1978) (Fuller Commander)
- Kamen Rider Black (1987) (Narrator (1 - 39))
- Godzilla vs. Mechagodzilla II (1993) (Narrator)
- Chōriki Sentai Ohranger (1995) (Bara Darts)
- Gekisou Sentai Carranger (1996) (VRV Master)
- Seijuu Sentai Gingaman (1998) (Degius)
- Kamen Rider OOO (2010) (Story within a story Narrator)
- Space Sheriff Gavan: The Movie (2012) (Narrator)

=== Video games ===
- Blood Will Tell (xxxx) (Narrator, Jukai)
- BS Zelda no Densetsu (MAP1 and MAP2) (xxxx) (Narrator)
- Samurai Shodown series (II, IV-V) (Jubei Yagyu)
- Tenchu: Kurenai (xxxx) (Narrator)
- Lupin III video games (1997-2010) (Daisuke Jigen)
- Lupin the 3rd: Treasure of the Sorcerer King (2002) (Daisuke Jigen)
- Valis: The Fantasm Soldier (1992 PC Engine port) (Rogles)
- World of Final Fantasy (2016) (Odin)

=== Dubbing roles ===
==== Live-action ====
- James Coburn
  - The Magnificent Seven (1974 NET Dub) (Britt)
  - The Great Escape (1971 Fuji TV Dub) (Louis Sedgwick)
  - Charade (1972 Fuji TV, 1985 TV Asahi, and 1994 NTV Dubs) (Tex Panthollow)
  - Major Dundee (1976 Fuji TV Dub) (Samuel Potts)
  - Our Man Flint (1978 Fuji TV Dub) (Derek Flint)
  - Dead Heat on a Merry-Go-Round (Eli Kotch)
  - In Like Flint (1973 Tokyo Channel 12 Dub) (Derek Flint)
  - Duck, You Sucker! (1977 TBS and DVD Dubs) (John H. Mallory)
  - Pat Garrett and Billy the Kid (Sheriff Pat Garrett)
  - Bite the Bullet (1981 TV Asahi Dub) (Luke Matthews)
  - Hard Times (1981 TV Asahi Dub)(Speed)
  - The Last Hard Men (1981 Fuji TV Dub) (Zach Provo)
  - Midway (1979 TBS edition) (Capt. Vinton Maddox)
  - Young Guns II (VHS Dub) (John Chisum)
  - Hudson Hawk (DVD Dub)(George Kaplan)
  - Sister Act 2: Back in the Habit (Mr. Crisp)
  - Maverick (Commodore Duvall)
  - Eraser (Arthur Beller)
  - The Nutty Professor (Harlan Hartley)
  - Payback (Fairfax)
  - Snow Dogs (James "Thunder Jack" Johnson)
  - American Gun (Martin Tillman)
- Lee Marvin
  - The Caine Mutiny (1979 Fuji TV edition) ("Meatball")
  - Bad Day at Black Rock (1969 Tokyo Channel 12 and 1973 NTV editions) (Hector David)
  - Attack (TV Asahi edition) (Lt. Col. Clyde Bartlett)
  - The Comancheros (TV Asahi edition) (Tully Crow)
  - The Man Who Shot Liberty Valance (1971 Fuji TV Dub) (Liberty Valance)
  - Donovan's Reef (1969 Tokyo Channel 12 and 1975 TBS Dubs)(Thomas Aloysius "Boats" Gilhooley)
  - The Killers (Charlie Strom)
  - Cat Ballou (1972 NET edition) (Kid Shelleen and Tim Strawn)
  - The Professionals (1980 TV Asahi edition) (Henry 'Rico' Fardan)
  - Point Blank (1972 NET edition) (Walker)
  - Paint Your Wagon (1978 Tokyo Channel 12 edition) (Ben Rumson)
  - Emperor of the North Pole (1977 Tokyo Channel 12 edition) (A-No.-1)
  - Shout at the Devil (1985 TBS edition) (Colonel Flynn Patrick O'Flynn)
  - Avalanche Express (1981 NTV edition) (Wargrave)
  - The Big Red One (1982 TBS edition) (The Sergeant)
  - Gorky Park (Jack Osborne)
- Tommy Lee Jones
  - Fire Birds (1993 TV Asahi edition) (Brad Little)
  - JFK (1994 TV Asahi edition) (Clay Shaw / Clay Bertrand)
  - The Fugitive (1996 TV Asahi edition) (Marshal Samuel Gerard)
  - Batman Forever (1998 TV Asahi edition) (Harvey Dent / Two-Face)
  - Blown Away (Ryan Gaerity)
  - Volcano (2005 TV Asahi edition) (Mike Roark)
  - U.S. Marshals (2004 TV Tokyo edition) (Chief Deputy Marshal Samuel Gerard)
  - The Hunted (2008 TV Tokyo edition) (L.T. Bonham)
  - A Prairie Home Companion (Axeman)
  - The Family (Robert Stansfield)
- George Kennedy
  - Airport (Joe Patroni)
  - Cahill U.S. Marshal (Abe Fraser)
  - Earthquake (1986 TV Asahi edition) (Lou Slade)
  - The Concorde... Airport '79 (1982 TV Asahi edition) (Capt. Joe Patroni)
  - Death Ship (Captain Ashland)
- Sam Elliott
  - Shakedown (Richie Marks)
  - The Hi-Lo Country (Jim Ed Love)
  - The Contender (Kermit Newman)
  - Ghost Rider (Carter Slade / Caretaker)
  - The Golden Compass (Lee Scoresby)
- Franco Nero
  - Django (1971 TV Asahi, 1975 TBS and 1980 TV Tokyo editions) (Django)
  - Texas, Adios (1989 TV Tokyo edition) (Burt Sullivan)
  - Force 10 from Navarone (DVD and 1986 TV Asahi editions) (Lescovar)
  - Die Hard 2 (1992 Fuji TV edition) (General Ramon Esperanza)
- Jack Palance
  - Shane (1974 NTV and 1979 TV Asahi editions) (Jack Wilson)
  - Torture Garden (Ronald Wyatt)
  - Compañeros (John)
  - City Slickers (TV Tokyo edition) (Curly Washburn)
- Christopher Plummer
  - The Silent Partner (1983 Fuji TV edition) (Harry Reikle)
  - The Insider (Mike Wallace)
  - Knives Out (Harlan Thrombey)
  - The Last Full Measure (Frank Pitsenbarger)
- Gian Maria Volonté
  - A Fistful of Dollars (1971 TV Asahi edition) (Ramón Rojo)
  - For a Few Dollars More (1973 TV Asahi edition) (El Indio)
  - A Bullet for the General (El Chuncho Muños)
- Clint Eastwood
  - True Crime (Steve Everett)
  - Space Cowboys (Colonel Frank Corvin)
  - Blood Work (Terry McCaleb)
- Airplane! (1983 TBS edition) (Captain Rex Kramer (Robert Stack))
- All the President's Men (1980 TBS edition) (Ben Bradlee (Jason Robards))
- The Best Years of a Life (Jean-Louis Duroc (Jean-Louis Trintignant))
- Beverly Hills Cop II (1990 Fuji TV edition) (Detective John Taggart (John Ashton))
- Cutthroat Island (Douglas "Dawg" Brown (Frank Langella))
- Dr. Dolittle (Jacob the Tiger (Albert Brooks))
- Face to Face (1977 TV Asahi edition) (Solomon "Beauregard" Bennet (Tomas Milian))
- A Few Good Men (Colonel Nathan R. Jessep (Jack Nicholson))
- Flash Gordon (1992 TV Asahi edition) (Ming the Merciless (Max von Sydow))
- The Godfather (1976 NTV edition) (Virgil Sollozzo (Al Lettieri))
- The Golden Child (1989 Fuji TV edition) (Sardo Numspa (Charles Dance))
- The Good, the Bad and the Ugly (Union Captain (Aldo Giuffre))
- Good Night, and Good Luck (Edward R. Murrow (David Strathairn))
- Gunfight at the O.K. Corral (1975 TV Tokyo edition) (Johnny Ringo (John Ireland))
- Hard Rain (Jim (Morgan Freeman))
- The Hitcher (1987 TV Tokyo edition) (Captain Esteridge (Jeffrey DeMunn))
- The Hunt for Red October (Captain 1st rank Marko Ramius (Sean Connery))
- Indiana Jones and the Temple of Doom (Lao Che (Roy Chiao))
- Knight Rider (Narrator)
- Lawrence of Arabia (1981 TV Asahi edition) (General Archibald Murray (Donald Wolfit))
- The Lord of the Rings: The Return of the King (Witch-king of Angmar (Lawrence Makoare))
- Near Dark (Jesse Hooker (Lance Henriksen))
- Pirates of the Caribbean: At World's End (Captain Edward Teague (Keith Richards))
- Pirates of the Caribbean: On Stranger Tides (Captain Edward Teague (Keith Richards))
- Presumed Innocent (Raymond Horgan (Brian Dennehy))
- Rome (Pompey Magnus (Kenneth Cranham))
- The Rookie (Strom (Raul Julia))
- Seven Golden Men Strike Again (1975 TV Asahi edition) (Adolf (Gastone Moschin))
- Snatch ("Brick Top" Pulford (Alan Ford))
- They Live (1990 TV Asahi edition) (Frank Armitage (Keith David))
- Tremors (Burt Gummer (Michael Gross))
- Teenage Mutant Ninja Turtles (Splinter)
- Yes Man (Terrence Bundley (Terence Stamp))
- The Young Master (Sang Kung (Shih Kien))

==== Animation ====
- Adventure Time (Ice President)
- Balto II: Wolf Quest (Nava)
- Batman: The Animated Series (Jonah Hex)
- Droopy (The Wolf)
- Oliver & Company (Roscoe)
- Samurai Jack (Thief)
- Shazzan (Shazzan)
- SWAT Kats: The Radical Squadron (Katscratch)
- Teenage Mutant Ninja Turtles (Splinter)
- The Incredibles (Rick Dicker)
- The Road to El Dorado (Hernán Cortés)
- Thunderbirds (Commander Norman)
- Totally Spies! (Jerry)
- X-Men (TV Tokyo edition) (Forge)

=== Other roles ===
- Battle of Okinawa (1971, Film) (Narrator)
- Daitokai Series (1976–79, Tv drama)
- Dragon Zakura (2005, TV drama) (Narrator)
- Hikari Ota's If I Were Prime Minister... Secretary Tanaka (2006, Variety show) (Narrator)
- Pro Sportsman No.1 (1995-2010, Sports entertainment television special) (Narrator)
- Sasuke (2006, Sports entertainment television special) (Narrator)
- Shukan Oriraji Keizaihakusho (2007, Variety show) (Narrator)
- Yōkai Ningen Bem (2011, TV drama) (Narrator)
- Seiyū Tantei (2021, TV drama) (Narrator)

== Awards ==
Year	Award	Category	Result
2017	11th Seiyu Awards	Merit Award	Won
2018	Tokyo Anime Award Festival 2018	Merit Award	Won
