= Bakumatsu Gijinden Roman =

Japanese anime television series

- Promo image for TV Tokyo anime

幕末義人伝 浪漫
- Genre: Action, Comedy
- Anime television series
- Directed by: Hirofumi Ogura
- Written by: Tatsuto Higuchi
- Music by: Hiroshi Takaki
- Studio: TMS Entertainment
- Licensed by: NA: Crunchyroll
- Original network: TV Tokyo
- Original run: January 7, 2013 – March 26, 2013
- Episodes: 12

Bakumatsu Gijinden Roman (幕末義人伝 浪漫) is a Japanese anime television series created by studio TMS Entertainment, based on the CR Ginroku Gijinden Roman pachinko game, with original character designs by Lupin III creator Monkey Punch. In the fantasy historical story, the main character is a "helper" named Manjirou by day and a phantom thief "retriever" named Roman by night. Roman steals back people's precious items that were unfairly taken from them.

== Plot ==
The story takes place in Kyoto in the late 19th century. Manjiro has two faces—during the day, he works as a helper for people in Kyoto, but he also acts in secret to return people's property that has been stolen from corrupt men in power. As the retriever "Roman", Manjiro is getting involved in a nationwide conspiracy.

== Characters ==
Roman (浪漫)
Voiced by: Kazuya Nakai
He is the main protagonist who goes by the name "Nezumi Kozo" at night, fighting against the injustices done to the townspeople. By day he is known as Mr. Helper, who does a myriad of odd jobs around town. He's not very good with money, since he will squander all his pay in gambling at the end of the day, which is why his sister Koharu doesn't trust him to run her decorative chopstick shop for fear that he may use the shop's earnings to finance his gambling habit.
Koharu (小春)
Voiced by: Eri Kitamura
She is Roman's younger sister, who runs a decorative chopstick shop by day. At night she assists with her brother's heroic capers together.

== Anime ==
The anime started airing on January 8, 2013. It is available subtitled in English on Crunchyroll.

=== Episode list ===
No.	Title	Original release date
1	"A Lavish Banquet of Raining Coins!" "Baban to Koban ga, Ōbanburumai!" (Japanese: 第壱話 ババンと小判が、大盤振舞！)	January 8, 2013
With the help of his friends, Roman's lavish banquet will return money and power to the people.
2	"A Lavish Banquet for That Hateful Jerk!" "Nikui Aitsu ga, Ōbanburumai!" (Japanese: 第弐話 ニクいアイツが、大盤振舞！)	January 15, 2013
Roman's latest robbery attempt has been stopped by a new member of the Mimawarigumi, Magoichi. Upset that he was bested by Magoichi, Roman has to hide it when Magoichi shows up at the Helper's.
3	"A Lavish Banquet for Guys in Trouble!" "Komatta Yatsura ga, Ōbanburumai!" (Japanese: 第参話 困った奴らが、大盤振舞！)	January 22, 2013
The secret of the Shogunate, the Coastal Atlas of Japan, has been stolen. It is up to the Helper to get it back.
4	"A Lavish Banquet in Skintight Swimsuits!" "Patsupatsu Mizugi de, Ōbanburumai!" (Japanese: 第肆話 ぱつぱつ水着で、大盤振舞！)	January 29, 2013
Ten million ryō... that is the Helper's share if the help the monkey face lord retrieve his family's hidden treasure. That much money is always followed by a string of headaches.
5	"Shred and Throw for Lavish Banquet!" "Chigiritte Nagete, Ōbanburumai!" (Japanese: 第伍話 千切って投げて、大盤振舞！)	February 5, 2013
Roman's secret identity has been found and challenged for the title of "Second Generation Nezumi Kozo" by Red!
6	"Alleys, Cellars, and a Lavish Banquet!" "Rojiura, Anagura, Ōbanburumai!" (Japanese: 第陸話 路地裏、穴蔵、大盤振舞！)	February 12, 2013
Roman's one true love has been kidnapped by a pervert. He has been asked by Orin to find her, and so has Magoichi, who has received some bad information.
7	"There's a Lot to Life, and a Lavish Banquet!" "Jinsei Iroiro, Ōbanburumai!" (Japanese: 第柒話 人生色々、大盤振舞！)	February 19, 2013
The helpers have been asked in secret by the Mito, Owari, and Kishu domains to find the thieves to continually steal from them. The task leads Roman to a military group, and the worst secret he could ever learn.
8	"What a Terrible Face, and a Lavish Banquet!" "Hidē Tsura Shite, Ōbanburumai!" (Japanese: 第捌話 ひでぇ面して、大盤振舞！)	February 26, 2013
Roman is broken and spends his days drinking; a man from his past attempts to snap him out of his rut. Meanwhile, Magoichi might have found what he was looking for.
9	"Bang Bang Ba-Bang! Its a Lavish Banquet!" "Banban Baban to, Ōbanburumai!" (Japanese: 第玖話 ばんばんばばんと、大盤振舞！)	March 5, 2013
Koharu is kidnapped. Roman and his friends are determined to rescue her.
10	"Show Your True Intentions with a Lavish Banquet!" "Porotto Honne de, Ōbanburumai!" (Japanese: 第拾話 ポロッと本音で、大盤振舞！)	March 12, 2013
After capturing Koharu, Otsu is shot and thrown off Admiral Perry's Ironclad. Roman and his friend managed to save her life. She reveals her tragic life story to Roman, while everyone prepares rescue Koharu.
11	"A Showdown You Won't Believe, and a Lavish Banquet!" (Japanese: 第拾壱話 たまげた勝負だ！ 大盤振舞！)	March 19, 2013
Roman and his friends, using one of the old man's inventions, rush quickly to Perry's high-tech Ironclad Shining Dawn. The team boards the ship under fire, while Roman tries to find his sister, Koharu. Roman soon discovers that Koharu has been brainwashed as part of Perry's plan to take over Japan.
12	"In Full Bloom! A Lavish Banquet of Smiles!" "Mankai! Egao no Ōbanburumai!" (Japanese: 第拾弐話 満開！ 笑顔の大盤振舞！)	March 26, 2013
Roman and his friends fight on the burning decks of the Shining Dawn; however, "Admiral" Perry has the brainwashed Koharu fires the ship's main gun and devastates Edo. The gang cripples the ship and while Roman confronts Perry in a final battle.
