= Lupin Zero =

Japanese original net animation series

- Key visual for the series
- Created by: Monkey Punch
- Original net animation
- Directed by: Daisuke Sakō
- Written by: Ichirō Ōkouchi
- Music by: Otomo Yoshihide
- Studio: Telecom Animation Film (animation); TMS Entertainment (production)
- Licensed by: NA: Sentai Filmworks
- Released: December 16, 2022 – January 13, 2023
- Episodes: 6

Lupin Zero (stylized in all caps) is a Japanese original net animation series based on the Lupin the 3rd manga series by Monkey Punch and part of its media franchise, commemorating the 50th anniversary of the anime series, serving as a prequel to the 1971 Lupin the 3rd series. Animated by Telecom Animation Film and produced by TMS Entertainment, the series was released exclusively on DMM TV from December 16, 2022, to January 13, 2023.

== Cast ==
Character	Voice actor
Lupin the 3rd	Tasuku Hatanaka
Daisuke Jigen	Shunsuke Takeuchi
Yoko	Saori Hayami
Lupin the 1st	Yoshito Yasuhara
Shinobu	Toa Yukinari
Lupin the 2nd	Toshio Furukawa

== Production ==
The series was announced on October 23, 2022. The series was directed by Daisuke Sakō with series composition and episode screenplays by Ichirō Ōkouchi, character designs by Asami Taguchi and music by Otomo Yoshihide. The opening theme is a rendition of "Afro 'Lupin '68'" performed by Yoshihide while the ending theme is a rendition of "Lupin Sansei Shudaika II" (ルパン三世主題歌II), performed by Tavito Nanao, both from the original 1971 Lupin the 3rd series.

TMS hosted the North American premiere of the series at 2022 Anime NYC on November 18, 2022.

Sentai Filmworks licensed the series in North America and streamed on HIDIVE. They released it on Blu-ray on September 26, 2023.

== Reception ==
Writing for The Fandom Post, Beveridge praised Lupin Zero as a "thoroughly enjoyable experience" that has the hallmarks of the original manga with actual violence and blood and "lightly pervy" moments. Giving the series an "A" rating, he also praised the relationship between Lupin and Jigen. Gunawan of Anime News Network described the relationship between the two characters as reminiscent of classic buddy cop films, and also gave the six-episode series an "A" rating. They praised the "simple and engaging" story and action scenes, but noted some viewers might not enjoy the retro art style, although they personally did.
