= Return of Pycal =

Japanese original video animation

- Lupin III: Return of Pycal
- VHS release cover

ルパン三世 生きていた魔術師 (Rupan Sansei Ikiteita Majutsushi)
- Created by: Monkey Punch
- Original video animation
- Directed by: Mamoru Hamatsu
- Written by: Ryō Katsuragi
- Music by: Yuji Ohno
- Studio: TMS Entertainment
- Licensed by: NA: Discotek Media
- Released: April 3, 2002
- Runtime: 48 minutes

Lupin III: Return of Pycal (Japanese: ルパン三世 生きていた魔術師, Hepburn: Rupan Sansei Ikiteita Majutsushi; lit. "Lupin III: The Magician Lived") is a 2002 Japanese original video animation based on Monkey Punch's Lupin III manga. Directed by Mamoru Hamatsu and released on April 3, 2002, it is the second OVA in the Lupin III franchise. The story features the return of the magician Pycal, in recognition of the 30th anniversary of the manga's first television anime adaptation. Return of Pycal won an Excellent Work Award at the 2003 Tokyo International Anime Fair. It was released in North America on July 27, 2021, by Discotek Media.

== Plot ==
When Lupin attempts to steal a gem, he is interrupted by Pycal, a magician who was considered to have died after facing off with Lupin in the past (chapter 7: "Magician" of the original manga and episode 2: "The Man They Called a Magician" of the first anime series). Pycal, once a trickster, now seems armed with real magical abilities, and seems determined to get his revenge on Lupin.

== Release ==
Return of Pycal was released on VHS and limited edition DVD by VAP on April 3, 2002. The limited edition DVD set includes a CD-ROM with a puzzle game, which if beaten would provide a password for ZIP files containing wallpapers, and a CD of the soundtrack. On April 23, 2003, a standard DVD version and a standalone CD of the soundtrack were released separately. Vap released Return of Pycal on Blu-ray on September 15, 2010.

Discotek Media announced their North American license to the OVA in December 2020. They released it on upscaled Blu-ray on July 27, 2021.
