= Yuji Ohno =

Japanese jazz musician (1941–2026)

- 大野雄二
- Born: May 30, 1941; Atami, Shizuoka, Japan
- Died: May 4, 2026 (aged 84); Tokyo, Japan
- Other names: Mahou P., Peter Stone
- Education: Keio University
- Occupations: Musician; composer; orchestrator; pianist
- Years active: 1968–2026
- Musical career
- Genres: Jazz fusion, jazz, electronic, experimental, new wave, ambient
- Instruments: Piano, keyboard
- Label: Lupintic Label
- Website: www.vap.co.jp/ohno/

Yuji Ohno (Japanese: 大野 雄二, Hepburn: Ōno Yūji; May 30, 1941 – May 4, 2026) was a Japanese jazz musician and composer. He is best known for scoring anime installments in the Lupin the Third franchise, which he called his life's work.

== Biography ==
=== Early life ===
Born in the founding family of Atami, Japan's Hotel Ohnoya, Ohno began playing piano in elementary school. He formed the group Junior Light Music with clarinetist and future NHK announcer Isamu Akashi, a classmate at Keio Senior High School. It was at this time that he taught himself jazz. While enrolled in the Faculty of Law at Keio University, he was a member of the big band Keio University Light Music Society. Later in college, on the recommendation of Kōji Fujika, he joined a quintet with Takeshi Shibuya.

=== Career ===
Ohno made his recording debut in 1966 backing Hideo Shiraki and Yūzō Kayama on their record Hideo Shiraki Meets Yuzo Kayama. Around 1970, he devoted himself to composing after being invited to compose for television commercials, before expanding to TV dramas and films. Ohno composed the score for the 1976 film The Inugami Family. Kōji Ishizaka, who starred in the film, was a classmate of Ohno's at Keio High School and Keio University. The promotional literature for the theatrical release contains an article about Ishizaka's visit to Ohno's recording studio.

In 1977, production of anime adaptations in the Lupin the Third franchise shifted from Yomiuri TV to Nippon TV, where Ohno was working on several TV dramas, and he was tapped to compose the score and theme songs for Lupin the 3rd Part II. Ohno later said he was excited to get the job because he felt he had to hold back for live-action dramas, where the music had to have something of a Japanese feel, but for Lupin the Third, he was told the music did not need to be tied to any specific country. He continued to compose every animated installment in the franchise, each of which featured a new version of "Lupin III Theme" (ルパン三世のテーマ, Rupan Sansei no Tēma), and called it his life's work. Also in 1977, Ohno composed "Proof of the Man Theme" for Proof of the Man. The following year, he composed "Warrior's Rest", the theme song for Never Give Up.

While working with Toshio Masuda, Ohno promised his friend Toru Murakawa that he would compose the music for his films once the latter became a director. Ohno fulfilled his promise on 1978's The Most Dangerous Game. He reprised his role for both sequels in what is known as the "Game Trilogy", The Killing Game (1978) and The Execution Game (1979).

=== Final years and death ===
On March 25, 2022, Ohno was hospitalized due to poor health. He received a Lifetime Achievement Award at the 2024 Tokyo Anime Award Festival. Ohno resumed activity on May 30, 2024, with the Lupintic Six with Fujikochans concert at Billboard Live Tokyo. He then stopped participating in performances, and focused on arranging and producing. Ohno died of natural causes in his sleep at his home in Tokyo, Japan on May 4, 2026, at the age of 84.

== Discography ==
- 1975: Sound Adventure Act. 1
- 1977: Proof of The Man
- 1978: Space Kid
- 1978: Lupin the Third Original Soundtrack
- 1979: Lupin the Third: The Castle of Cagliostro Original Soundtrack
- 1981: Cosmos
- 1985: Lupin the Third: Legend of the Gold of Babylon Original Soundtrack
- 1987: Lupin the Third: The Fuma Conspiracy Original Soundtrack
- 1989: Lupin the Third: Bye Bye Liberty Crisis Original Soundtrack
- 1990: Lupin the Third: The Hemingway Papers Original Soundtrack
- 1991: Lupin the Third: Steal Napoleon's Dictionary! Original Soundtrack
- 1992: Lupin the Third: From Russia with Love Original Soundtrack
- 1993: Lupin the Third: Voyage to Danger Original Soundtrack
- 1994: Lupin the Third: Burn, Zantetsuken! Original Soundtrack
- 1995: Lupin the Third: Farewell to Nostradamus Original Soundtrack
- 1996: Lupin the Third: Dead or Alive Original Soundtrack
- 1997: Lupin the Third: Walther P38 Original Soundtrack
- 1998: Isn't It Lupintic?
- 1998: Lupin the Third: Memories of Blaze Original Soundtrack
- 1999: ルパン三世 愛のダ・カーポ～FUJIKO'S Unlucky Days～
- 1999: Lupin the Third: The Columbus Files Original Soundtrack
- 2000: ルパン三世 1$マネーウォーズ オリジナル・サウンドトラック
- 2000: Isn't It More Lupintic?
- 2000: LUPIN THE THIRD「JAZZ」the 2nd
- 2000: LUPIN THE THIRD「JAZZ」
- 2001: LUPIN THE THIRD「JAZZ」Another"JAZZ"
- 2001: LUPIN THE THIRD「JAZZ」Bossa&Fusion
- 2001: ルパン三世 アルカトラズコネクション オリジナル・サウンドトラック
- 2001: WHAT'S THE WORRY?
- 2001: LUPIN THE THIRD「JAZZ」THE 3RD Funky&Pop
- 2002: LUPIN THE THIRD「JAZZ」"CHRISTMAS"
- 2002: LUPIN TROIS par Yuji Ohno et Kahimi Karie!!!
- 2002: LUPIN THE THIRD「JAZZ」PLAYS THE"STANDARDS"
- 2002: 「ルパン三世 生きていた魔術師」オリジナル・サウンドトラック
- 2002: ルパン三世 魔術王の遺産
- 2002: ルパン三世 EPISODE：0 ファーストコンタクト
- 2003: LUPIN THE THIRD「JAZZ」PLAYS THE"STANDARDS"&OTHERS
- 2003: 「ルパン三世 お宝返却大作戦！」オリジナル･サウンドトラック
- 2004: LUPIN THE THIRD「JAZZ」Cool For Joy
- 2004: 洒落たナイト・スティーミンならルパンにおまかせ「Night Steamin' Lupin」ナイト・スティーミン
- 2004: ルパンと一緒にカフェ・リラクシン「Cafe Relaxin' Lupin」カフェ・リラクシン
- 2004: ルパン・サウンドでドライブ・グルーヴィン「Drive Groovin' Lupin」ドライブ・グルーヴィン
- 2004: 「盗まれたルパン-コピーキャットは真夏の蝶-」オリジナル・サウンドトラック
- 2004: NHK「小さな旅」TOKYO CITY LIGHTS
- 2005: LUPIN THE THIRD「JAZZ」the 10th ～New Flight～
- 2005: 「天使の策略～夢のカケラは殺しの香り～」オリジナル・サウンドトラック
- 2005: -Made In Y.O.-（2枚組）
- 2006: THE BEST COMPILATION of LUPIN THE THIRD『LUPIN! LUPIN!! LUPIN!!!』
- 2006: プレイステーション2用ソフト『ルパン三世～ルパンには死を、銭形には恋を～』オリジナル・サウンドトラック
- 2006: 「セブンデイズ ラプソディ」オリジナル・サウンドトラック
- 2007: 「ルパン三世のテーマ」30周年コンサートDVD『LUPIN! LUPIN!! LUPIN!!!』
- 2007: LUPIN THE THIRD「JAZZ」～What's Going On～
- 2007: THE BEST COMPILATION of LUPIN THE THIRD『DIVA FROM LUPIN THE THIRD』
- 2007: MEMORIAL SOUND TRACK of LUPIN THE THIRD『霧のエリューシヴ』
- 2008: sweet lost night
- 2008: LUPIN THE THIRD "GREEN vs RED"
- 2009: 『Feelin' Good』
- 2009: LUPIN THE THIRD "JAZZ"「FOR LOVERS ONLY」
- 2010: LUPIN THE THIRD Last Job
- 2010: Y.O. Connection
- 2011: Eternal Mermaid
- 2011: 『LET'S DANCE』
- 2012: ルパン三世 東方見聞録～アナザーページ～ オリジナル・サウンドトラック「Another Page」
- 2012: ルパン三世アニメ化40周年記念 ベスト盤3枚組CD 「BOSS ANIME～ MORE LUPIN! LUPIN!! LUPIN!!! ～」
- 2012: 「BOSS PIANO」
- 2013: ルパン三世vs名探偵コナン THE MOVIE オリジナル・サウンドトラック
- 2013: PRINCESS OF THE BREEZE
- 2014: 『BUONO!! BUONO!!』
- 2014: LUPIN THE THIRD「JAZZ」シリーズ・ベストアルバム LUPIN THE BEST"JAZZ"
- 2014: UP↑ with Yuji Ohno & Lupintic Five
- 2015: 『Yuji Ohno & Lupintic BEST』
- 2015: ルパン三世 PARTIV オリジナル・サウンドトラック～ITALIANO
- 2016: 『introducing Fujikochans with Yuji Ohno & Friends』
- 2016: 『YEAH!! YEAH!!』
- 2016: ルパン三世 PART IV オリジナル・サウンドトラック～MORE ITALIANO
- 2017: THE BEST COMPILATION of LUPIN THE THIRD『LUPIN! LUPIN!! LUPINISSIMO!!!』
- 2017: 『LET'S FALL IN JAZZ』
- 2017: 『RED ROSES FOR THE KILLER』
- 2018: ルパン三世 PART5 オリジナル・サウンドトラック『THE OTHER SIDE OF LUPIN THE THIRD PART V～FRENCH』
- 2018: ルパン三世 PART5 オリジナル・サウンドトラック『LUPIN THE THIRD PART V～SI BON ! SI BON !』
- 2019: 映画「ルパン三世 THE FIRST」オリジナル・サウンドトラック『LUPIN THE THIRD ～THE FIRST～』
- 2019: 『LUPIN THE THIRD ～PRISON OF THE PAST～』
- 2019: 『LET'S FALL IN JAZZ AGAIN』
- 2019: 『LUPIN THE THIRD ～GOODBYE PARTNER～』
- 2021: ルパン三世 PART6 オリジナル・サウンドトラック1 『LUPIN THE THIRD PART6～LONDON』
- 2022: LUPIN THE THIRD JAZZ at ブルーノート東京 2022.2.26（LP2枚組）
- 2022: 大野雄二ベスト・ヒット・ライブ ～ルパンミュージックの原点～ at 東京国際フォーラム ホールA 2022.1.28（LP2枚組）
- 2022: ルパン三世 PART6 オリジナル・サウンドトラック2 『LUPIN THE THIRD PART6～WOMAN』
- 2023: アニメ『ルパン三世VSキャッツ・アイ』オリジナル・サウンドトラック

== Filmography ==
- The Inugami Family (1976)
- Proof of the Man (1977)
- Lupin the 3rd Part II (1977–1978)
- One Million-Year Trip: Bander Book (1978) – Television film
- The Mystery of Mamo (1978)
- Never Give Up (1978)
- The Golden Dog (1979)
- Undersea Super Train: Marine Express (1979) – Television film
- The Castle of Cagliostro (1979)
- Fumoon (1980) – Television film
- Andromeda Stories (1982) – Television film
- A Time Slip of 10,000 Years: Prime Rose (1983) – Television film
- Lupin the 3rd Part III (1984–1985)
- Mighty Orbots (1984)
- Nebula Mask Machineman (1984)
- Legend of the Gold of Babylon (1985)
- Aitsu ni Koishite (1987)
- Bye Bye, Lady Liberty (1989) – Television film
- The Hemingway Papers (1990) – Television film
- Napoleon's Dictionary (1991) – Television film
- From Siberia with Love (1992) – Television film
- Voyage to Danger (1993) – Television film
- Dragon of Doom (1994) – Television film
- Farewell to Nostradamus (1995)
- The Pursuit of Harimao's Treasure (1995) – Television film
- Lupin III: Dead or Alive (1996) – Main theme only
- The Secret of Twilight Gemini (1996) – Television film
- Island of Assassins (1997) – Television film
- Crisis in Tokyo (1998) – Television film
- The Columbus Files (1999) – Television film
- Missed by a Dollar (2000) – Television film
- Alcatraz Connection (2001) – Television film
- Return of Pycal (2002) – original video animation
- Episode 0: The First Contact (2002) – Television film
- Operation Return the Treasure (2003) – Television film
- Swallowtail Tattoo (2004) – Television film
- Angel Tactics (2005) – Television film
- Seven Days Rhapsody (2006) – Television film
- The Elusiveness of the Fog (2007) – Television film
- Green vs. Red (2008) – original video animation
- Sweet Lost Night (2008) – Television film
- Lupin III vs. Detective Conan (2009) – Television film, with Katsuo Ohno
- The Last Job (2010) – Television film
- Blood Seal of the Eternal Mermaid (2011) – Television film
- The Secret Page of Marco Polo (2012) – Television film
- Princess of the Breeze (2013) – Television film
- Lupin III vs. Detective Conan: The Movie (2013) – With Katsuo Ohno
- Lupin the Third Part IV (2015–2016) – Japan only
- Italian Game (2016) – Television film
- Lupin the 3rd Part 5 (2018)
- Goodbye Partner (2019) – Television film
- Lupin III: The First (2019)
- Prison of the Past (2019) – Television film
- Lupin the 3rd Part 6 (2021–2022)
- Lupin the 3rd vs. Cat's Eye (2023) – Original net animation
