= Cliff Harrington =

American actor

Clifford Harrington
- Born: June 18, 1932; Seattle, Washington, U.S.
- Died: August 9, 2013 (aged 81); Kyushu, Japan
- Occupation: Voice actor
- Years active: 1962–2013
- Spouse: Tomoko Harrington

Clifford Harrington (June 18, 1932 – August 9, 2013) was a Tokyo-based American voice actor who primarily did dubbing work for Frontier Enterprises.

== Biography ==
Born in Seattle, Washington on June 18, 1932, military life eventually brought Harrington to Japan where he would end up teaching English for 35 years. Beyond that, Harrington would become involved in the entertainment industry. He is perhaps best known for his brief appearance as Al in King Kong vs. Godzilla, and by happenstance ended up dubbing the voice of the helicopter pilot he sat next to (in the Japanese version).

Harrington dubbed many films via William Ross and Frontier Enterprises, spending countless hours in recording studios working with Japanese technicians. He even worked as cinematographer on Robert Dunham's independent film Time Travelers. Harrington was close friends with Ross, and as such, he had more scope to negotiate his roles and work schedule. According to Richard Nieskens, Harrington eventually began to show up less and less around the late 1980s and early 1990s, having grown bored of the process after so many decades.

The country afforded Harrington the chance to use his college journalism training as a writer and photographer to meet and interview movie stars and other celebrities who came to Tokyo from other countries, including the likes of Mel Gibson, Muhammad Ali, Charlton Heston, and Robert Mitchum.

Harrington married his wife Tomoko in 1988, and moved to Kyushu in 2011 to be closer to his wife's aging parents. Harrington fell ill sometime in early 2013, and never recovered. He died in Kyushu on August 9, 2013, at the age of 81.

== Filmography ==
=== Dubbing ===
==== Anime ====
- Choppy & the Princess (1967–1968) – Choppy

==== Anime films ====
- The Little Prince and the Eight-Headed Dragon (1963) - Rabbit
- Lupin the 3rd: The Mystery of Mamo (1978) – Dan Dunn (1979 Toho/Frontier dub)
- Cyborg 009: The Legend of the Super Galaxy (1980) – Professor Isaac Gilmore
- Voltus 5 (1980) – Mark Gordon, Commander Robinson, and narrator
- Arcadia of My Youth (1982) – Zoll
- The Dagger of Kamui (1985) – Taroza, and Iga Chief

=== Video games ===
- Ys III: Wanderers from Ys (1991) – Mayor Grady
