= Green vs. Red =

2008 original video animation directed by Shigeyuki Miya

- Lupin the Third: Green vs. Red
- Original release cover

ルパン三世 GREEN vs RED (Rupan Sansei: Gurīn tai Reddo)
- Genre: Action, Adventure, Comedy
- Created by: Monkey Punch
- Original video animation
- Directed by: Shigeyuki Miya
- Produced by: Hiroyuki Ueno; Yasuo Ueda; Yu Kiyozono
- Written by: Toshimichi Okawa
- Music by: Yuji Ohno
- Studio: TMS Entertainment
- Licensed by: NA: Discotek Media
- Released: April 2, 2008
- Runtime: 79 minutes

Lupin the Third: Green vs. Red (ルパン三世 GREEN vs RED, Rupan Sansei: Gurīn tai Reddo), is the third original video animation release of Monkey Punch's popular Lupin the Third media franchise. It was released on April 2, 2008, as part of the 40th anniversary of the series. Discotek Media released Green vs. Red on DVD in North America on May 21, 2013.

== Plot ==
The summary is a linear version of the events of the animation.

After Lupin III's disappearance in the world, people have begun imitating Lupin's appearance and personality in an attempt to become the "real Lupin". After a fake Lupin was captured by the police for shoplifting a convenience store, all the Lupins around the world travel to Tokyo to free the captured Lupin only to be captured themselves. A skilled pick pocketer named Yasuo is given a green coat and a Walther P38, the same gun Lupin uses, by a mysterious elderly man, implied to be the real Lupin. Yasuo decides to don the Green jacket and takes the role of Lupin. He then announces to the company Night Hawk that he will steal the object they have secured in the building, the Ice Cube. After gathering information on the Ice Cube, Yasuo is confronted by the real Lupin donning the Red Jacket. Yasuo decides that if he can defeat the real Lupin, he will be considered the new Lupin. However they are interrupted when a missile strikes the car behind Yasuo and is seemingly killed. Yasuo awakens to find out Fujiko Mine had saved his life and decides to cooperate with her and her plan to steal the Ice Cube. After breaking into the Night Hawk building, Yasuo manages to gain possession of the Ice Cube which is revealed to be the prototype of a new generation of nuclear warfare. Lupin and Koichi Zenigata allows Yasuo to escape with the Ice Cube to prevent its misuse in war. The next day, another fake Lupin decides to set up a match between Lupin and Yasuo. The two meet atop a building and a Lupin with an unknown jacket color is thrown off the building. The unknown Lupin awakens in an ambulance and escapes before Zenigata captures him. Yasuo decides to pay a visit to his sick grandmother who wishes him well, while this transpires, Jigen and Fujiko visit the old man at the bookshop Yasuo frequents earlier, or Red Jacket Lupin in disguise. Later that night, Yasuo, revealed to be the winner of the duel, escapes with Daisuke Jigen from the cops.
