= Kosei Maru =

Kosei Maru is the name of a number of ships. Kosei Maru may refer to:-

- SS Kosei Maru, a 3,262 GRT Japanese cargo ship sunk by USS Sunfish on 13 March 1943. Built as EFC Design 1023 Buffalo Bridge 1919 by Submarine Boat Company.
- SS Kosei Maru, a 3,551 GRT Japanese cargo ship sunk by USS Sargo on 11 November 1943.
- MS Kosei Maru, a ferry built in 1991 and currently in service with Seatruck Ferries.
- MS Kosei Maru, a 697 GRT oil/chemical tanker built in 1992 and currently (December 2014) owned by Enterwell — Kuching, Malaysia.
