= Lupin the 3rd: The Mystery of Mamo =

1978 Japanese animated film by Sōji Yoshikawa

Lupin III: The Mystery of Mamo
- Theatrical release poster by Monkey Punch
- Kanji: ルパン三世
- Romanization: Rupan Sansei
- Directed by: Sōji Yoshikawa
- Screenplay by: Atsushi Yamatoya; Sōji Yoshikawa
- Based on: Lupin III by Monkey Punch
- Starring: Yasuo Yamada; Eiko Masuyama; Kiyoshi Kobayashi; Makio Inoue; Goro Naya; Kō Nishimura
- Cinematography: Keishichi Kuroki
- Edited by: Yoshiaki Aihara
- Music by: Yuji Ohno
- Production company: Tokyo Movie Shinsha
- Distributed by: Toho
- Release date: December 16, 1978
- Running time: 102 minutes
- Country: Japan
- Language: Japanese
- Budget: ¥500 million
- Box office: ¥915 million

Lupin III: The Mystery of Mamo, also known as Lupin III: The Secret of Mamo, is a 1978 Japanese adult animated science fiction action adventure comedy film. It is the first animated feature film based on the 1967–69 manga series Lupin III by Monkey Punch. The film was originally released in Japan as Lupin III (ルパン三世, Rupan Sansei), but was later retitled to Lupin III: Lupin vs. the Clone (ルパン三世 ルパンVS複製人間(クローン), Rupan Sansei Rupan tai Kurōn). Directed by Sōji Yoshikawa, who co-wrote the screenplay with Atsushi Yamatoya, the film was produced by animation studio Tokyo Movie Shinsha and distributed by Toho. The film's plot follows master thief Lupin III, who attempts to foil Mamo ― a wealthy and powerful recluse seeking immortality ― while trying to win the affections of his rival and would-be lover, Fujiko Mine.

The film was theatrically released in Japan on December 16, 1978, by Toho. Since its original Japanese release, the film has been licensed to several companies for release in North America and Europe, with four different English dubs of the film being produced in that time. In 2013, North American distributor Discotek Media released the film on a DVD containing all four English dubs, as well as extensive liner notes and essays about the film and its production. In 2022, Discotek Media released the film on Blu-ray.

Financially successful upon release, The Mystery of Mamo has continued to polarize critics and fans, especially in English-speaking markets. Praise for the film tends to be aimed at its originality and faithfulness to the manga, and criticism usually focuses on the execution of the third act. The English dubs, though varying widely in terms of their production quality, interpretation of the dialogue and voice acting, have frequently been singled out for praise. The five-part saga Lupin the IIIrd directed by Takeshi Koike acts as a prequel to the movie.

== Plot ==
Inspector Zenigata travels to Castle Dracula in Transylvania to confirm the execution of his longtime nemesis Arsène Lupin III; the body he finds is a decoy that is being used by the real Lupin to flee from the castle. Zenigata travels to Egypt, believing that Lupin will raid the Giza Necropolis based on prior thefts of immortality-granting objects. His prediction proves accurate, but Lupin and his colleagues Daisuke Jigen and Goemon Ishikawa XIII flee with the Philosopher's Stone. (Note: Named the "Wiseman's Stone" in the Toho/Frontier and Manga UK dubs.) The Stone was requested by Lupin's would-be lover, Fujiko Mine, who, having agreed to obtain the Stone for a mysterious client, steals it from Lupin in Paris. The benefactor, who calls himself Mamo, discovers that the Stone is a fake made by Lupin.

In response, Lupin's gang is attacked by Mamo's forces before finding their hideout destroyed by his henchman, Flinch. Jigen and Goemon blame the hideout's destruction on Fujiko, before quarrelling between themselves; Lupin calms the others by promising to abandon his desires for Fujiko. With nowhere else to go, they travel toward the ocean before finding a house with food and water. A wounded Fujiko comes for Lupin, forcing him to go against his promise and causing Jigen and Goemon to abandon them. Fujiko drugs Lupin before Flinch arrives to take them to Mamo. Jigen later returns to find Flinch's plane taking off, but retrieves a clue to its destination. He and Goemon are later interrogated about Mamo by American agents, but are released when they are unable to answer their questions. During the inquiry, they decipher Fujiko's clue, leading them to Mamo's Caribbean island.

Mamo, a mysterious billionaire officially known as Howard Lockewood, tells Lupin that he manipulated him into stealing the Stone as a test, as he is considering granting him and Fujiko immortality in admiration of his skills and her beauty. Lupin, however, is more interested in the Stone, and searches Mamo's island for it. After retrieving the Stone, he and Fujiko are chased by Mamo's henchmen until they stumble across Mamo's lair. Mamo deems Lupin unworthy of eternal life and attempts to visualize his perverted nature to Fujiko, but she refuses to abandon him. The USAF attacks the base, having tracked Jigen and Goemon to the island. Jigen rescues Lupin and Fujiko and seemingly kills Mamo in a shootout, while Goemon duels with Flinch. Flinch is ultimately killed, but the altercation damages Goemon's sword, the Zantetsuken, causing him to leave for training purposes.

Zenigata tries to catch the gang, who escape the island with the unconscious Lupin, but fails. He is found by the ICPO chief, who had traveled to Colombia to tell him that he's off the Lupin case and that the situation is bigger than either of them can handle. Zenigata responds by resigning and chasing Lupin as a private citizen.

Lupin, Fujiko and Jigen travel to Colombia, where Lupin theorizes that Mamo may have gained eternal life by continuously cloning himself. They are thrust into a vision by Mamo, who reveals that his cloning technique has kept him alive for ten thousand years, and that he is responsible for virtually every major event in human history. Mamo also explains that he cloned Lupin. He then appears in person to reclaim Fujiko, and a distraught Lupin challenges him to perform a miracle. Mamo responds by setting off an earthquake through the destruction of a nuclear power station.

Inside a temple, Mamo explains to Fujiko that his cloning technique has never been perfected, and that he has degenerated from his original form as a result. He decides that he and Fujiko must repopulate the Earth, and convinces her to push a button to launch nuclear missiles to achieve this end. Lupin arrives, and reveals that he rigged the missiles to explode before they could launch. Frustrated, Mamo takes Fujiko with him to a launching pad and fends Lupin off with lasers. Lupin uses the tip of Goemon's sword (given to him by Jigen earlier) to deflect the lasers, incinerating Mamo.

A rocketship emerges, containing a giant brain that reveals itself to be the original Mamo. Lupin realizes that Mamo had controlled his clones resembling his body just as the rocket launches into space. Lupin and Fujiko escape the rocket's trajectory, but not before Lupin plants an explosive on it. The glass shatters, and Mamo's brain drifts toward the sun. Lupin finds Fujiko in the rubble, where he is captured by Zenigata. Fujiko offers to help Lupin, but the Americans launch a missile attack on Mamo's base. Fujiko is rescued by Jigen while Lupin and Zenigata, anklecuffed together, escape on foot. Goemon, on top of a mountain, makes a fourth wall-breaking closing statement.

== Cast ==
Character name	Voice actor				
Character name	Japanese	English			
Character name	Japanese	Toho International/Frontier (1979) (Note: The Toho dub did not feature any English voice credits. Fans have identified likely cast members from among Frontier regulars; although credited on Discotek releases the liner notes specify they are "a best guess, not a citation-worthy, rock-solid studio confirmation.")	Screenmusic Studios/Streamline Pictures (1995)	World Wide Sound/Manga Entertainment (1996)	Geneon/Phuuz (2003)
Arsène Lupin III	Yasuo Yamada	Tom Clark	Bob Bergen	Wolf III	Tony Oliver
Arsène Lupin III	Yasuo Yamada	Tom Clark	Bob Bergen	William Dufris	Tony Oliver
Fujiko Mine	Eiko Masuyama	Margo	Edie Mirman	Toni Barry	Michelle Ruff
Fujiko Mine	Eiko Masuyama	Patricia Kobayashi	Edie Mirman	Toni Barry	Michelle Ruff
Mamo (Howard Lockewood)	Kō Nishimura	Mamaux (Phoward Phughes)	Mamo (Hayward Lockewood)	Mamo (Foward Fughes)	Paul St. Peter
Mamo (Howard Lockewood)	Kō Nishimura	Mike Worman	Robert Axelrod	Allan Wenger	Paul St. Peter
Daisuke Jigen	Kiyoshi Kobayashi	Dan Dunn	Steve Bulen	Eric Meyers	Richard Epcar
Daisuke Jigen	Kiyoshi Kobayashi	Cliff Harrington	Steve Bulen	Eric Meyers	Richard Epcar
Goemon Ishikawa XIII	Makio Inoue	Samurai	Ardwight Chamberlain	Goemon the Samurai	Lex Lang
Goemon Ishikawa XIII	Makio Inoue	William Ross	Ardwight Chamberlain	Garrick Hagon	Lex Lang
Inspector Heiji Zenigata VII	Gorō Naya	Ed Scott	Detective Zenigata		Dan Lorge
Inspector Heiji Zenigata VII	Gorō Naya	Greg Starr	David Povall	Seán Barrett	Dan Lorge
Special Presidential Aide Starky	Tōru Ōhira	Mr. Gissinger	Heinrich Gissinger	Mr. Gissinger	Joey D'Auria
Special Presidential Aide Starky	Tōru Ōhira	Frank Rogers	Steve Kramer	John Baddeley	Joey D'Auria
Special Agent Gordon	Hidekatsu Shibata	Don Knode	Michael Forest	William Roberts	Michael McConnohie; Richard Cansino (some lines)
Police Commissioner	Kōsei Tomita	William Ross	Jeff Winkless	John Baddeley	Richard Cansino
Flinch	Shōzō Iizuka	Greg Starr	Jeff Winkless	William Roberts	Bob Papenbrook
Scientist	Ichirō Murakoshi	Donald Johnson	Michael Forest	George Roubicek	Richard Cansino
Thug Guard	Shunsuke Shima	Greg Starr	Steve Kramer	George Roubicek	Richard Cansino
Egyptian Officer	Masaru Miyashita	John Armstrong	Carl Macek	Eric Meyers	Lex Lang
Egyptian Police Chief	Haruo Minami	Joseph Zucatti	Steve Kramer	John Baddeley	Richard Cansino
U.S. President	Fujio Akatsuka	John Armstrong; Joseph Zucatti (some lines)	Steve Kramer	Seán Barrett	Richard Cansino
Soviet General Secretary	Ikki Kajiwara	Joseph Zucatti	Jeff Winkless	William Roberts	Richard Cansino

== Production ==
The Mystery of Mamo was produced while the second Lupin III television series was being broadcast, and was created with the intention of making a film that was aesthetically and thematically faithful to Monkey Punch's original manga, as censorship standards of the time prevented such content being reproduced for TV animation. Due to an increased popularity of the first series, staff who had worked on that series were assembled to make the film. Yasuo Otsuka, who was animation director and character designer on that series, supervised the film's production. Sōji Yoshikawa, who storyboarded the first and last episodes of the first series, acted as director and co-writer of the screenplay. Atsushi Yamatoya, a writer and director of pink films who had written two episodes of the first series (and later the third animated Lupin film, Legend of the Gold of Babylon), also contributed to the script. Yuzo Aoki, a key animator for episodes 11 and 23 of the first series, was responsible for the angular, Monkey Punch-esque character designs seen in the film (he would later become noted for such work on Lupin III Part III and Legend of the Gold of Babylon). Tsutomu Shibayama, who was the character designer for the 1969 Pilot Film that had preceded the original series, was responsible for the layout. A relative newcomer in the film's production team was composer Yuji Ohno, who had provided the score for the second series. The main cast of the second series also resprised their roles for the film.

Mamo was Tokyo Movie Shinsha's first full-length feature production. The movie was given a budget of 500 million yen, comparable to major live action films at the time and unheard of for an animated production. Production lasted for 15 months and involved 1,315 members of staff. The storyboard was 575 pages. 62,000 cel sheets were used in the animation, compared to 5,000 cels used in an average half-hour TV animation. Oversized cels were used and filmed in a modified VistaVision process known as "Anime Vision", which allowed for a brighter and sharper picture for projection in theaters compared to a TV production. 18,000 reference images were used for background and mechanical research, and 196 individual character drawings were created.

Mamo's name is taken from the villain Kyousuke Mamo who had appeared in the manga and first TV series. His physical design was inspired by Swan, Paul Williams' character in the 1974 musical horror film Phantom of the Paradise, and represents a monster who is both a boy and an old man at the same time. The characters Special Presidential Aide Starky and Special Agent Gordon are parodies of Henry Kissinger and G. Gordon Liddy respectively; the first three English dubs renamed the former "Gissinger".

== Release ==
The Mystery of Mamo was originally released in Japan on December 16, 1978, as Lupin III. The film was a financial success, earning 950 million yen and making it the ninth-highest grossing Japanese film of the 1979 film season. Footage from the film's first English dub, along with scenes from The Castle of Cagliostro, was used by Stern Electronics (under license from TMS) to make the Dragon's Lair-style laserdisc video game Cliff Hanger. By the mid-1980s, TMS re-titled the film in Japan as Lupin III: Lupin vs. the Clone, while English-speaking fans begun referring to the film as The Mystery of Mamo, the name of the first North American release, to distinguish it from the two TV series and The Castle of Cagliostro.

A TV broadcast of the film on March 28, 2014, on NTV attained an audience share of 11.2% in the Kantō region of Japan. It was the second highest share for a movie broadcast during that week.

To commemorate the 50th anniversary of the Lupin III franchise, The Mystery of Mamo received a limited theatrical re-release in Japan on September 1, 2017, utilizing a newly remastered print in 4K resolution, a 5.1 surround sound mix and 4D effects.

=== English releases ===
The original English-dubbed version of the film was produced by Frontier Enterprises in 1979 at the commission of distributor Toho. Sharing the same Lupin III title as the Japanese release, it was made for JAL flights and could also be booked at theaters from the Los Angeles branch of Toho International, but did not receive a home media release of its own in English-speaking countries. The full voice cast of this version remains unverified due to there being no credits for cast on any known prints. Identified cast members include Tom Clark as Lupin, Cliff Harrington as Jigen, Patricia Kobayashi as Fujiko, Frontier Enterprises owner William Ross as Goemon, and Greg Starr as Zenigata. It was once speculated that actors from the English adaptation of Speed Racer by Titra Studios were involved in this dub, but their involvement in its production has since been deemed impossible. Although largely faithful to the original Japanese script, most of the names of the main characters were changed to Western-sounding alternatives. Whereas other early English dubs changed Lupin's name to avoid possible legal disputes with the estate of Maurice Leblanc (the creator of the original Arsène Lupin), however, his name was used in this dub. Anime historian Carl Horn provided Yasuo Otsuka with a VHS copy of the dub in 1987 because Otsuka was previously unaware of it.

The first widely distributed English dub was produced by Streamline Pictures and released in North America by Orion Home Video on VHS in 1995 under The Mystery of Mamo. It was Streamline's third and final Lupin dub, following The Castle of Cagliostro and episodes 145 and 155 of Lupin the Third Part II. The dub was also the first and only from Streamline to solely refer to Lupin by his proper name because of the Leblanc estate's copyright, which caused the prior dubs to primarily refer to him as "Wolf". Directed by Streamline co-founder Carl Macek, the adaptation was written by Ardwight Chamberlain, who based his script off the Toho dub, but made various alterations to the original dialogue. Bob Bergen, Steve Bulen, Edie Mirman, and David Povall reprised their roles as Lupin, Jigen, Fujiko, and Zenigata, while an uncredited Chamberlain replaced Steve Kramer as Goemon. According to anime historian and Streamline co-founder Fred Patten, the dub was created after copyright issues with TMS prevented Macek from releasing the film with the Toho dub. The dub was later released to a Region 0 DVD by Image Entertainment in 1998. While the eponymous villain's name was meant to be spelled "Mamaux" in English, the Streamline release popularized the "Mamo" spelling.

In the United Kingdom, the UK branch of Manga Video released an English dub in 1996 to VHS as Secret of Mamo. It was one of two Lupin III dubs released that year by Manga's UK branch, who also distributed a VHS dub of the television special Goodbye Lady Liberty. The third dub was adapted and directed by actor-director George Roubicek from a script based on the Toho dub and utilized the same television special cast of William Dufris as Lupin, Eric Meyers as Jigen, Toni Barry as Fujiko, Garrick Hagon as Goemon, and Sean Barret as Zenigata. As with the earlier Streamline dubs and Manga's dub of Goodbye Lady Liberty, Lupin's name was changed to "Wolf III" in this version to avoid potential copyright infringement.

The fourth and final English dub was produced by Phuuz Entertainment and released to DVD in North America by Pioneer Entertainment in 2003. Sharing the Secret of Mamo title from Manga's release, the DVD used an anamorphic print from the Japanese DVD that was modified to remove unlicensed usages of corporate logos and a magazine image depicting Lupin with the Justice League. This dub used the cast of Tony Oliver as Lupin, Richard Epcar as Jigen, Michelle Ruff as Fujiko, Lex Lang as Goemon, and Dan Lorge as Zenigata, who were also dubbing Lupin the Third Part II with Phuuz at the time. As with Pioneer's dub of the series, it attracted a moderate amount of criticism; while the voice acting was well-received, the script received a mixed reaction from critics and fans for its departures from the Japanese dialogue. The dub also appeared on an Australian DVD release from Madman Entertainment in 2006 and the Hulu video streaming service in 2012.

All four English dubs were featured on a new DVD released in 2013 by Discotek Media, who utilized an uncut Japanese print. Discotek's release also includes the original Japanese audio, along with an isolated score track, as well as several essays and liner notes on the film. The Toho dub was extensively restored and reconstructed from an edited version of the dub on a previous Italian DVD release, as well as copies of the dub provided by fans. Discotek re-released the film on Blu-ray in 2022 with further restorations of the Toho and Manga dubs and other features, including credits created by Discotek for the Toho dub.

== Reception ==
Manga Mania reviewer Peter Lyle described the film as "a convoluted tale that plays like the adventures of James Bond, Don Juan and Charlie Chaplin all rolled into one" with "plenty of wry humour and slapstick". Lyle additionally praised the animated effects and supporting characters. In summary he felt that Mamo was "a healthy dose of fun".

In his review for Mania.com, Chris Beverdige enjoyed the movie despite having previously disliked it on a previous viewing several years before. He attributes this to being more familiar with the characters through other entries in the Lupin III franchise. However, he criticised the final third of the movie for its science fiction elements, which he felt were inferior to the action and character-driven elements of the first two thirds. This criticism was shared in another review for Mania.com by John Erini, except that he believed that the film became unwatchable due to the development of the Mamo character.

Rob Lineberger, writing for DVD Verdict, also agrees with the criticism of the final third, and despite repeated viewings, felt no closer to understanding the events. Additionally, he criticised the "lack of cohesion" and "unbroken string of jump cuts and deus ex machinas" throughout the film. Reflecting on the positives of the film, Lineberger highlights the characters of Jigen, Goemon and Fujiko as being more interesting than either Lupin or Mamo. He also credits the movie for tackling interesting concepts such as cloning, personal identity, love and honour, despite the way they are presented. In summary, he suggests that Lupin fans will find a more ambitious story in this film than the television episodes if they can accept some flaws. He recommends people who are not Lupin fans to watch The Castle of Cagliostro instead.

Darius Washington of The Fandom Post reviewed the Discotek edition of Mamo. He described the structure of the film's story as "haphazard" and "a bit hard to get into", while praising the collection of "educational" extras and different English dubs on Discotek's release. In conclusion, Washington felt that "the film itself is decent", but is more suited for learning about anime history than for entertainment value. He gave the film content a "B" rating and the extras an "A+" rating.

Lupin expert Reed Nelson, in writing a feature titled Lupin the Third: The Complete Guide to Films, TV Specials and OVAs for Anime News Network (ANN), placed Mamo in the "Maybe" category of the franchise's media that he considered was worth viewing. Praising Discotek Media's "fancy" DVD release, he described the film as "often held up as the example of how to write a Lupin story – it has unfolding drama within the core cast, a truly threatening villain, and an unusual dedication to mature storytelling. Note that its gangly character designs and false endings may be kind of a turn-off for modern audiences".

In an essay included with Discotek Media's release, ANN contributor Mike Toole highly praised The Mystery of Mamo in virtually every aspect, describing the film as "the absolute essence of Lupin III". Toole particularly lauded Sōji Yoshikawa's direction (likening the director's affinity for bizarre images and situations to the works of Werner Herzog), as well as the film's cartoonish but detailed animation and design work, characterization and humour. He also gave praise to all four English language tracks of the film, particularly the Toho dub, and noted the film's relevance to real-world events of the time (including the Cold War, the Watergate Scandal, the publication of David Rorvik's novel In his Image: The Cloning of a Man and the birth of Louise Brown). Toole concludes his essay by stating that "[m]ore than 30 years after its debut, [The Mystery of Mamo], with its heady mix of globe-trotting action, raciness, wild comedy, and hot jazz-funk music, is the original Lupin, the real deal. Accept no substitutes – even if they're clones! As the international trailer for this anime classic proclaims: Lupin III can do anything!"
