= Charlie Kosei =

Japanese musician (born 1950)

- チャーリー・コーセイ
- Born: Cheui Gwongsing (徐 光星); October 14, 1950 (age 75); Kobe, Hyōgo Prefecture, Japan
- Other names: Charles Cheui (チャールズ・チェー); Charlie Cheui (チャーリー・チェイ); Kosei Cheui (チェイ光星); Charlie Corsey
- Occupations: Musician; singer; jazz musician; performer
- Years active: 1968–present
- Labels: Teichiku Records; Nippon Columbia; Nippon Crown; VAP, Inc.; Charlie's

Charlie Kosei (チャーリー・コーセイ, Chārī Kōsei) (born October 14, 1950, in Kobe, Hyōgo Prefecture, Japan) is a jazz musician and performer, most known for his contributions to the soundtrack of the first Lupin III anime series. He was born as Cheui Gwongsing (徐光星; Mandarin: Xu Guangxing; Japanese: Jo Kōsei). He also contributed his voice to the English-language song Que Sera Sera in the PlayStation 2 videogame Katamari Damacy and performed the Japanese translation of Secret Agent Man. He is also performing for the opening theme 『下弦の月』 (Kagen no tsuki, waning moon) of the anime series Mononoke.

Throughout his career he has been known as Charles Cheui (チャールズ・チェー, Chāruzu Chē), Charlie Cheui (チャーリー・チェイ, Chārī Chei), and Kosei Cheui (チェイ光星, Chei Kōsei). He is also known in English as "Charlie Corsey".
