= Mimori =

- Gender: Female

Origin
- Origin: Japanese
- Meaning: Different meanings depending on the kanji used

Mimori (written: 未森) is a feminine Japanese given name. Notable people with the name include:

- Mimori Yusa (遊佐 未森) (born 1964), Japanese singer-songwriter

Fictional characters:

- Mimori Kiryu, character in the anime series s-CRY-ed
- Mimori Kishida (岸田 美森), character in the anime series AKB0048
- Mimori Mizuha (水羽ミモリ), a character in the role-playing video game Blue Archive

Mimori (written: 三森 lit. "three forests" or 深森 lit. "deep forest") is also a Japanese surname. Notable people with the surname include:

- Suzuko Mimori (三森 すずこ) (born 1986), Japanese voice actress
- Masaki Mimori (三森 大貴) (born 1999), Japanese professional baseball Infielder

Fictional characters:

- Seira Mimori (深森 聖良), character in the manga series Saint Tail
- Togo Mimori, born Washio Sumi, a main character and Yuna's best friend in Yuki Yuna is a Hero.
