= Lupin the 3rd Part I =

Japanese anime television series

- North American DVD set released by Discotek Media
- ルパン三世
- Based on: Lupin the 3rd by Monkey Punch
- Directed by: Masaaki Ōsumi; A Production Director Group (Note: Label consisting of various directors from A Production)
- Music by: Charlie Kosei; Takeo Yamashita
- Country of origin: Japan
- Original language: Japanese
- No. of episodes: 23 (list of episodes)

Production
- Executive producers: Yutaka Fujioka (Tokyo Movie); Juichi Sano (Yomiuri TV)
- Production companies: Yomiuri TV; Tokyo Movie (Note: Production assistance (制作協力) for all episodes provided by A Production.)

Original release
- Network: YTV, NTV
- Release: October 24, 1971 – March 26, 1972

Lupin the 3rd Part I is a Japanese anime television series produced by Tokyo Movie. Part of the Lupin III franchise, it is the first anime television adaptation of the Lupin III manga series created by Monkey Punch. The series was originally broadcast as simply Lupin III (Japanese: ルパン三世, Hepburn: Rupan Sansei) on Yomiuri TV, Nippon Television and other stations between October 24, 1971, and March 26, 1972. Among English-speaking fans, the series was commonly known as the "Green Jacket" series in reference to Lupin's outfit, but more recently it is now known as "the first Green Jacket" series because of the outfit's return in Part 6.

Production of the show began after the pilot film was approved by the committee, and was originally intended to be released as a stand-alone animated film. Notable industry veterans, including future Ghibli co-founders Hayao Miyazaki and Isao Takahata, were among the show's staff, with the show's animation being handled by A Production (now Shin-Ei Animation). The show received scrutiny during its run due to its mature themes, leading to director Masaaki Osumi's firing and replacement by Miyazaki and Takahata. The show was eventually cancelled when 23 out of the planned 26 episodes had been produced due to low ratings.

Lupin the 3rd Part I has received positive critical reevaluation and higher ratings as reruns followed, and it is now considered one of the best installments in the series. Critics have highlighted the show's place in the animation medium, which was at its darkest age during the late 60s and early 80s, as well as influencing public perception of animation in Japan as catering to a general audience.

== Premise ==
Lupin III, grandson of the gentleman thief Arsène Lupin, is an internationally wanted thief. His right-hand man is Daisuke Jigen, an expert marksman who can shoot a target within 0.3 seconds. They are joined by Fujiko Mine, Lupin's primary love interest who often manipulates situations to her advantage. After several encounters with the samurai and expert swordsmen Goemon Ishikawa XIII, he becomes part of the group. They are constantly pursued by Inspector Heiji Zenigata VII, an expert on Lupin from the Tokyo MPD, who has made the capture and arrest of Lupin and his collaborators his life goal.

== Cast ==
| Character | Japanese | English |
| Character | Japanese | Epcar Entertainment/TMS/Discotek (2021–2022) |
|---|---|---|
| Lupin III | Yasuo Yamada | Tony Oliver |
| Daisuke Jigen | Kiyoshi Kobayashi | Richard Epcar |
| Fujiko Mine | Yukiko Nikaido | Michelle Ruff |
| Inspector Heiji Zenigata VII | Gorō Naya | Doug Erholtz |
| Goemon Ishikawa XIII | Chikao Ōtsuka | Lex Lang |
| Tokyo MPD Commissioner | Ichirō Nagai | Derek Stephen Prince |

== Production ==
=== Pilot Film ===
Adapting Monkey Punch's manga into animation was first suggested by animator Gisaburō Sugii to Yutaka Fujioka, the founder of Tokyo Movie Shinsha (then known as Tokyo Movie). Although Fujioka was interested in the idea, Tokyo Movie lacked the financial resources to produce such a project on its own. This led to the creation of a CinemaScope Pilot Film, which was intended to generate interest in the project and secure funding from potential producers. The Pilot Film, consisting of narrated introductions to the five lead characters of the manga, was scripted and animated by Sugii, Yasuo Otsuka, Tsutomu Shibayama and Osamu Kobayashi, with supervision by Masaaki Ōsumi and background art by Reiji Koyama. The music soundtrack was composed by Norio Meida, while the narration dialogue was written by Jiro Saito and Toshiaki Imaizumi. Yasuo Otsuka had left Toei Animation to join Tokyo Movie, as working on Lupin would allow him to use his knowledge and lifelong interest in guns and transport in his animation. The team studied Monkey Punch's style in detail, including the influence of American cartoonist Mort Drucker on the manga, and analysed the characters from all angles; they were initially assisted by Monkey Punch himself until he felt the project was too much for him. Scripts and treatments were also written for a feature film adaptation, one of which depicted Lupin before the start of his thieving career as a hippie in Shinjuku, and explained how he came to be pursued by the police and other criminals.

Although the animation quality of the Pilot Film was high for the time in which it was made, few financial backers were interested in the project due to its adult themes of violence and sexuality. After a year, the project was still unsold, and the Pilot Film was adapted for television. The animation of the TV version was mostly identical to the CinemaScope version, but featured a largely different voice cast—the only voices who were retained for both versions were those of Kiyoshi Kobayashi (as Jigen) and Eiko Masuyama (as Fujiko). In 1971, Yomiuri TV agreed to produce a TV adaptation of the manga. By this time, only Otsuka and Ōsumi were still at Tokyo Movie. Ōsumi was assigned as director, and Otsuka became the character designer; Kobayashi provided key animation on several episodes. The series was originally planned for 26 episodes, with synopsis created for each one. Kiyoshi Kobayashi was retained as Jigen for the TV series (and continued to voice the role until 2021), while Gorō Naya and Chikao Ōtsuka, who voiced Goemon in the CinemaScope version of the Pilot Film and Zenigata in the TV version respectively, were assigned the opposite of each other's roles for the series. Yasuo Yamada and Yukiko Nikaido, neither of whom were involved in the Pilot Film, were cast as Lupin and Fujiko. Yamada, known for his dubbing of Clint Eastwood, continues to be widely acclaimed for his serious and humorous portrayals of Lupin, and became synonymous with the role even after his death in 1995. Masuyama played the one-time character of Catherine in an episode of the series, and eventually replaced Nikaido as Fujiko from the second series onward until her retirement in 2010. Although not officially released until the Lupin III Secret Files (シークレットファイル, Rupan Sansei — Shīkuretto Fairu) collection in 1995, animation from the TV version of the Pilot Film was recycled for several of the series' opening credits sequences, despite Lupin wearing a red jacket in these sequences (it was changed to green for the series at Otsuka's insistence).

=== Production and broadcast ===
The series was broadcast on Yomiuri TV between October 24, 1971 and March 26, 1972. Early ratings for the series were poor; after the broadcast of the second episode, Ōsumi was asked to make changes to the series in the hopes of broadening its appeal; after refusing to do so, he was fired from his directorial duties. Hayao Miyazaki and Isao Takahata had recently moved from Toei Animation to Tokyo Movie in order to begin pre-production on an adaptation of Pippi Longstocking. When that work was cancelled, they were chosen as replacements for Ōsumi by Otsuka, who had previously worked with them at Toei. Episodes produced following Ōsumi's departure either did not provide a directorial credit, or were credited to "A Production's Team of Directors" in place of Miyazaki and Takahata. Due to the production schedule of the series, many episodes are a mix of influences between Ōsumi, Takahata and Miyazaki. Episode 9 was the final episode that Ōsumi had full creative control of. Unlike Ōsumi, Miyazaki and Takahata agreed to make several changes to the series, many of which were based on their own perspectives regarding the source material. They immediately set out to remove what they perceived as a sense of "apathy" from the series, which they felt was also evident in society. To achieve this, they gave the characters a more positive outlook: Lupin would become "happy-go-lucky" and "upbeat", Jigen would be "a friendly, cheery fellow", while Fujiko's "cheap eroticism" was removed and Goemon's anachronistic nature was used for occasional comic relief. These changes lead to a lack of unity in the visuals and a "duality". The music for the series was composed by Takeo Yamashita, with many songs being performed by Charlie Kosei.

Lupin the Third Part I is noted to be the first animated series created in Japan to target an adult audience with an emphasis on mature, complex characters and storylines. It also frequently placed an emphasis on realism, with attention to details of vehicles, weapons and consumer items (which were only approximated in the manga) being a cornerstone of Otsuka's animation style. Previously, all Japanese animated series were family-friendly. The first episode of the series ("Is Lupin Burning...?!") is also noted for being the first animated work in the Lupin canon to execute what Reed Nelson describes as the "Lupin-Formula", a series of plot elements that would frequently be revisited through future instalments in the franchise. These elements include:

- Lupin and/or his gang challenging or robbing a more sinister criminal/organization than themselves
- Fujiko being captured by the villain(s) and subsequently being rescued by Lupin
- Fujiko betraying Lupin to give herself an advantage in the caper
- Zenigata attempting to capture Lupin (occasionally with success), only to have Lupin escape his grasp.

== Release ==
Numerous home releases have been published in Japan. Emotion and VAP both published VHS releases of the series. For the 25th anniversary of the original manga, VAP released a six volume edition from March 1993. A four volume edition was released on July 23, 1999. The series was released in Japan in a DVD box set by VAP on July 4, 2001. The set was limited to 30,000 copies. A Blu-ray box set of four discs was released on December 21, 2008, and on four individual discs on January 21, 2009. Kodansha launched Lupin III DVD Collection, a bi-weekly magazine on January 27, 2015. Scheduled to run for 45 issues, the magazine includes a DVD containing episodes from the first two Lupin III TV series.

Discotek Media licensed and released the series on DVD in North America as Lupin the 3rd: The First TV Series Complete Collection on June 26, 2012. The release includes audio commentaries on several episodes, essays and liner notes as well as both versions of the Pilot Film.

Several releases have been made of the music from the series. Two singles were released on December 10, 1971 and January 20, 1972. The Original BGM Collection was released as an LP by Nippon Columbia on March 25, 1980. This was later reissued on CD on March 14, 2007 for the 40th anniversary of the original Manga. Music from the series was also released on two albums, Lupin III 71' Me Tracks published by VAP on February 21, 1999 and Lupin III The 1st Series Music Anthology, published by Nippon Columbia on March 21, 2003. The songs and background music on both albums were using tapes that had sound effects layered on-top of the music. Due to a loss of the original master tape for the background music, the music from the series was recreated by Takeo Yamashita and released as Rebirth From '71 Series on January 21, 2003. The 1979 Italian dub (Le avventure di Lupin III) features the disco song "Planet O" during the closing credits, credited to Daisy Daze And The Bumble Bees.

In 2021, in honor of Lupin III's 50th anniversary, an English dub of the first episode of Part I was announced by Lex Lang with the help of Sentai Filmworks. The English voice cast of prior Lupin III dubs from Part II and Doug Erholtz of Part IV onward will reprise their roles for the project with Richard Epcar serving as director and providing a 9-minute video introduction. The dubbed episode received a limited theater release alongside the first two episodes of Part VI. A YouTube release was originally planned by TMS, but was later postponed due to scheduling conflicts. It was eventually released on November 21, 2021.

On December 13, 2021, Discotek Media announced Part I would be released on Blu-ray with all 23 episodes restored from their original 35 mm film sources along with a restored soundtrack and sound effects from the original master tapes. It also contains liner notes, rare production art, and a new English dub of the entire series. It was released on May 31, 2022.

== Reception ==
The series received a record number of orders from the broadcast industry and had a 9% viewing share during its original broadcast. With a 32.5% average household rating, the December 8, 1978, rebroadcast of the final episode is the sixth most watched anime since the television ratings group Video Research began keeping track on September 26, 1977.

In November 1994, Monkey Punch himself named the first series as the best anime adaptation of Lupin III, particularly the first few episodes, citing its faithfulness to his manga. Shinichirō Watanabe, director of Cowboy Bebop and Samurai Champloo, has spoken of being heavily influenced by the work of director Masaaki Ōsumi on the series.

In 2001, the staff of Animage listed the series as the ninth most important anime of all time. The Agency for Cultural Affairs placed the series in 50th place on a list of the best anime.

Chris Beveridge of The Fandom Post praised the extras and production of Discotek's DVD release. He described the series as "a ton of fun". Mike Dent, writing for Otaku USA called the series "fantastic" but highlighted the first 12 episodes as the "true gems of the show". In Anime Classics Zettai!, Brian Clamp and Julie Davies observed the series had a serious "crime film feel" and darker tone compared to other animated adaptions of the series due to violence as well as the sexualisation of Fujiko. They also noted the attention to background detail and animation.

In a feature written for Anime News Network, Reed Nelson states that "The transition [between Ōsumi's seinen-themed episodes and the family-friendly Miyazaki–Takahata installments] is not entirely smooth, but [the series is] a fascinating watch for the curious, and can give new viewers a glimpse into the variety the franchise offers as a whole".
