= Daisuke Jigen =

Fictional character from manga series Lupin III

- Lupin III character
- Jigen drawn by Monkey Punch
- First appearance: Lupin III chapter 7: "Magician", November 9, 1967 (Weekly Manga Action)
- Created by: Monkey Punch
- Portrayed by: Kunie Tanaka (1974) (Note: Strange Psychokinetic Strategy); Tetsuji Tamayama (2014–23) (Note: Lupin the 3rd, Daisuke Jigen)
- Voiced by (Japanese): Kiyoshi Kobayashi (1969–2021); Akio Ōtsuka (2021–present); Other: Banjō Ginga (1987) (Note: The Fuma Conspiracy); Daisuke Gōri (1998) (Note: Lupin III D2 Manga); Shunsuke Takeuchi (2022) (Note: Lupin Zero)
- Voiced by (English): Richard Epcar (2002–2007; 2017–present); Other: Cliff Harrington (Frontier Enterprises/Toho International: 1979) (Note: The Mystery of Mamo); Steve Bulen (Streamline Pictures: 1992–95) (Note: The Castle of Cagliostro, Lupin the Third Part II eps. 145 and 155, The Mystery of Mamo); Sean P. O'Connell (AnimEigo: 1995) (Note: The Fuma Conspiracy); Eric Meyers (Manga Entertainment: 1996) (Note: The Mystery of Mamo, Bye Bye, Lady Liberty); John Snyder (Animaze/Manga Entertainment: 2000) (Note: The Castle of Cagliostro); Christopher Sabat (Funimation: 2002–13) (Note: The Secret of Twilight Gemini, The Pursuit of Harimao's Treasure, Dragon of Doom, Voyage to Danger, Farewell to Nostradamus, Tokyo Crisis, The Columbus Files, Dead or Alive, Island of Assassins, Missed by a Dollar, The Woman Called Fujiko Mine); Dan Woren (Bang Zoom! Entertainment/Discotek Media: 2014–26) (Note: Jigen's Gravestone, Goemon's Blood Spray, Fujiko's Lie, Zenigata and the Two Lupins, The Immortal Bloodline)

In-universe information
- Aliases: Dan Dunn (Note: Used in Frontier Enterprises/Toho International's dub of The Mystery of Mamo and TMS' subtitled print of The Castle of Cagliostro); Jeff (Note: Used in Cliff Hanger)
- Occupation: Thief; Gangster; Spy
- Weapon: Smith & Wesson Model 19
- Nationality: Japanese

Daisuke Jigen (Japanese: 次元 大介, Hepburn: Jigen Daisuke) is a fictional character created by Monkey Punch for his manga series Lupin III, which debuted in Weekly Manga Action on August 10, 1967. Jigen is the marksman, aide-de-camp and best friend of Arsène Lupin III. Along with colleague Goemon Ishikawa XIII, he joins Lupin in pursuit of riches acquired typically by theft. Traveling across the globe, Jigen has garnered fame as a gunman with wildly capable speed and accuracy.

== Creation and conception ==
According to Monkey Punch, Jigen was created as a New York raised American gangster based on actor James Coburn, especially his role in The Magnificent Seven. When the series was adapted into animation, the role was portrayed by Kiyoshi Kobayashi, the voice actor responsible for dubbing many of Coburn's roles into Japanese. The character's name comes from Monkey Punch's love for the word "dimension," which translates to "jigen" in Japanese. In an interview with Mainichi Shimbun, he stated the name is a corruption of the Japanese phrase "jigen daisuki" (次元大好き, "I love dimensions").

== Skills ==
Jigen is master thief Arsène Lupin III's right-hand man and sharpshooter. He can perform a 0.3-second quick-draw, providing accuracy that borders on superhuman. With ease he can shoot skeet with a handgun, explode a missile before it hits by targeting the warhead, and deflect another bullet by shooting it in mid-flight.

Known by his trademark broad-brimmed fedora pulled over his eyes and short chin curtain beard, Jigen's favorite ploy is the trick shot. Jolting a large object into the air with gunfire and using it to clobber an enemy or shooting overhanging deco such as a chandelier to drop and encumber a group are just two of his many non-lethal tactics. In the second anime series, a non-canonic story implies he uses a notch on the hat for aiming; actually he can fire accurately without the hat and has done so several times.

A master of many different firearms, Jigen's armory includes revolvers, machine guns, sniper rifles, and even a PTRS anti-tank rifle. His preferred carry-around is a Smith & Wesson Model 19 combat revolver usually tucked in the back of his pants or housed in a fabric belt holster. He prefers the Model 19 due to its stopping power and reliability against misfire. He feels quite not himself without a gun: The Fuma Conspiracy shows a disarmed Jigen instinctively aiming with his empty hand.

== Personality ==
In the original manga series, Jigen is not always at Lupin's side but instead lurks in the background until he is needed. In the anime series, however, Jigen is portrayed as extremely loyal to Lupin and always willing to partner with him for any given heist.

Jigen is known for his quick temper; both enemies and friends alike have fallen victim to his tendency to respond to insults with violence. Even Lupin and Goemon have been on the receiving end of his blows in reaction to their frank or comical criticism.

Despite Jigen's gruff facade, he has an ironic sense of humor and genuinely enjoys participating in each caper with his partners. He is, by far, the more pragmatic of the group, with a cynical streak founded in failed romances (his luck with women runs from bad to worse, with love interests often betraying him or dying). He is always distrustful of Fujiko Mine and becomes irritated when Lupin goes along with one of her plans. Among Lupin's group, Jigen is the least apprehensive at taking human life. While he considers killing women and children taboo, he is willing to put down any age or gender who offers a life threat, such as Linda in Part 2 Episode 26.

Where Lupin and Goemon both have unique sartorial tastes, Jigen prefers a more minimalist style. His typical wardrobe consists of a dark gray, dark green, or black business suit, paired with a white or light blue dress shirt, a black tie, and his ever-present dark gray or black broad-brimmed fedora. The hat ranks as his most prized possession outside of his weaponry.

During the third anime series, his outfit appears lighter in color, and his hatband features a crosshatched or grid-pattern design, similar to the original manga interpretation of the character. However, the classic black ensemble is most commonly used in OVA productions and TV specials. Jigen's thick hair is typically collar-length and unevenly cut. His chin curtain beard ranges from one to three inches in length and is similarly unruly.

In a few anime episodes, an occasional visual gimmick is used in which Jigen pulls his hat forward so that only the lower half of his face is visible. If he is without his hat, his hair often falls over his upper face and eyes. Such instances are rare, however; in most animated depictions, his face is clearly shown with or without his hat.

Jigen serves as the "big brother" of the group and often acts as the voice of reason to Lupin's impulsiveness—partly out of friendship and partly out of sheer professionalism. Nevertheless, he has long since accepted that he will inevitably be dragged into even the most outrageous schemes. Like the rest of the Lupin gang, Jigen is skilled in the use of disguises and can pilot virtually any motorized vehicle. He is also a formidable hand-to-hand combatant, capable of knocking out an attacker with a single blow.

Although his racial origins remain ambiguous, Jigen was once a renowned bodyguard and assassin for several American criminal mobs. Among the various accounts of his past, the most popular story portrays him as an American mobster who fled to Japan while on the run. There, he adopted a Japanese identity and the name "Jigen," which is actually the Japanese word for "dimension", rather than a traditional personal name. According to Lupin, Jigen has few hobbies, largely due to his preference for staying at home. When he does go out, he usually attends target practice, visits a favorite bar, plays poker, enjoys a boxing match, or eats at a chop house-style restaurant. He also has a weakness for Spaghetti Westerns, lounging, classical music (except in Episodes 79 and 89 of Part 2), and hearty American food.

Jigen's most obvious pastime is smoking; there is hardly a time when he is not seen with a cigarette, usually one bent in several directions. His preferred brands have been Pall Mall Filter Longs or Marlboro Red. He is also seen occasionally smoking a briar pipe. As well, Jigen enjoys drinking scotch, bourbon, vodka, beer and occasionally fine wines; he has a "heavyweight's" resistance to intoxication.

The Tokyo Pop releases of the original Lupin manga note in their preface that Jigen's appearance and temperament are based on the actor James Coburn, especially Coburn's role, Britt, in The Magnificent Seven. This has been confirmed by Monkey Punch during a 2003 Dallas, Texas anime convention interview. In a television documentary celebrating the manga's history, Monkey Punch stated he based the Jigen/Lupin relationship on Alain Delon and Charles Bronson's teaming in the 1968 film Adieu l'ami.

Addendum: 2023's anime series Lupin Zero indicates Lupin and Jigen were children together in mid 1960's Japan, with Jigen having access to guns and well-developed marksmanship. Whether this series is considered canon has yet to be revealed.

== Appearances ==
=== Manga ===
Jigen first appeared in chapter 7 of the manga "Magician" (魔術師, Majutsushi) in which he and his partner Lupin encounter a man named Pycal of whom they must defeat. In the end, Pycal's fate is left ambiguous as soon as Lupin manages to replicate one of his magic tricks against him.

=== Anime ===
Jigen as seen in Dragon of Doom

In the anime series, Jigen is an expert gunman who can supposedly shoot in 0.3 seconds with his Smith & Wesson Model 19. Although his M19 is his preferred weapon, he is skilled in a number of different firearms.

=== Live-action ===
The character was portrayed by Kunie Tanaka in the 1974 Japanese live-action film Lupin III: Strange Psychokinetic Strategy. The 2014 feature film featured Tetsuji Tamayama in the role. Tamayama reprised the role in a 2023 spin-off film titled after the character.

== Voice actors ==
Daisuke Jigen was first voiced by Kiyoshi Kobayashi in both versions of the 1969 pilot film for the first anime, and he continued to voice the character for over fifty years. On September 7, 2021, a spokesperson for Kobayashi announced his retirement from the role; Kobayashi was the last remaining member of the franchise's original voice cast. Part 6 featured Kobayashi's final performance in its first episode, with Akio Ōtsuka taking over the role for the remainder of the series. In the Lupin Zero prequel ONA series, Jigen is voiced by Shunsuke Takeuchi.

Prior to his retirement, Kobayashi's only absence from the role of Jigen had been for the 1987 original video animation The Fuma Conspiracy. Citing budget concerns, TMS declined to employ the regular voice cast; Banjō Ginga instead voiced Jigen in the film.

Daisuke Jigen's English voice actor in the 1979 Toho dub of The Mystery of Mamo (in which the character was renamed "Dan Dunn") was not credited but is typically identified as Cliff Harrington. Steve Bulen voiced the character in several dubs produced by Streamline Pictures. Sean P. O'Connell (1995, AnimEigo). Eric Meyers (1996, Manga UK). John Snyder (2000, Animaze/Manga). Christopher Sabat voiced the character for Funimation Entertainment's dubs of several TV specials and theatrical films between 2002 and 2005, and for their 2013 dub of The Woman Called Fujiko Mine. Richard Epcar voiced Jigen in the Phuuz dub for Pioneer/Geneon's release of the second anime between 2003 and 2006, and reprises the role for Discotek Media's dubs of the fifth and sixth anime as well as several films and specials. Dan Woren voiced Jigen in the Bang Zoom! Entertainment dub for Discotek's 2015 release of the Jigen's Gravestone film and its four sequels.

== Reception ==
Jigen has been referred to in other anime and manga such as Excel Saga. Anime historian Carl Horn has described Jigen as "The epitome of cool".
