= List of Lupin the 3rd Part 6 episodes =

Japanese anime television series

Lupin the 3rd Part 6
- Season 6
- Cover art of the first Blu-ray box set as released in Japan
- No. of episodes: 24 + Episode 0

Release
- Original network: Nippon TV
- Original release: October 10, 2021 – March 27, 2022

Series chronology
- ← Previous; Part V: Misadventures in France

Lupin the 3rd Part 6 (ルパン三世 PART6, Rupan Sansei Pāto Shikkusu) is an anime television series in the Lupin the Third franchise, produced at TMS Entertainment and directed by Eiji Suganuma and written by Takahiro Ōkura. It is the seventh anime adaptation of the Lupin III series created by Monkey Punch. Part 6 is produced at TMS Entertainment and directed by Eiji Suganuma, who previously directed the Lupin TV special Prisoner of the Past in 2019. It is written by Takahiro Ōkura with character design by Hirotaka Marufuji. The series will feature scripts from guest writers like Mamoru Oshii, Masaki Tsuji, Taku Ashibe, Kanae Minato, and Akio Higuchi. The series was announced by TMS on May 26, 2021, and aired with an episode 0 from October 10, 2021, to March 27, 2022, on Nippon TV and other NNS networks, in conjunction with the 50th anniversary celebration of the anime, with Part I having premiered on October 24, 1971. On August 20, 2021, Sentai Filmworks licensed the series for home video and streaming on Hidive. In the United States, Adult Swim's Toonami programming block premiered the series on April 17, 2022. (Note: Adult Swim lists the series as premiering on April 16, 2022 at 1:30 a.m. (25:30) EDT/PDT, which is effectively April 17.)

== Episode list ==
No.	Title	Directed by	Written by	Storyboarded by	Original release date	English air date
0	"Episode 0: The Times"; Transliteration: "Episōdo Zero: Jidai" (Japanese: EPISODE 0 ―時代―)	Nobuo Tomizawa	Yūya Takahashi	Nobuo Tomizawa	October 10, 2021	April 17, 2022
Lupin, Jigen, and Goemon end up in jail after being betrayed again by Fujiko and captured by police using the latest high-tech weaponry: armed drones equipped with AI programming and plastic guns which spray quick-setting adhesive. Jigen laments how much has changed in the modern world, and contemplates quitting the thievery business, leaving Lupin and Goemon. After they escape from prison, Jigen plans to go his own way, but through conversations between everyone, including Zenigata, he realizes life is more interesting working with Lupin, and stays behind to let everyone escape and stop Zenigata when he arrives at their hideout. After fleeing, Lupin is confident that they'll see Jigen again soon. Note: "Episode 0: The Times" was made as a tribute to Jigen's Japanese voice actor, Kiyoshi Kobayashi, who retired from voicing the character after this episode.
Lupin vs. Holmes
1	"Enter Sherlock Holmes"; Transliteration: "Shārokku Hōmuzu Tōjō" (Japanese: シャーロック・ホームズ登場)	Kazuhiro Soeta	Takahiro Ōkura	Eiji Suganuma	October 17, 2021	April 24, 2022
Albert d'Andrésy, disguised as Lord Faulkner, steals a movie poster from Faulkner's collection, but he is apprehended by Inspector Lestrade, assisted by Sherlock Holmes. Holmes has been taking it easy solving low-stake cases, while caring for a schoolgirl named Lily. Albert attempts to escape and is shot, but is rescued by Lupin and his crew, who are investigating the mysterious "Raven" society and their hidden treasure. During the commotion, the poster is cut in half, Lupin's crew getting one half and the police retrieving the other. While Lord Faulkner is being held at Scotland Yard for interrogation about the significance of the poster, a "Raven" agent plants a bomb on him, killing him and destroying part of the building. Fujiko attempts to reclaim the other half of the poster in the chaos, but she is caught by Zenigata. She escapes with Lupin, leading Zenigata and the police in pursuit through the streets of London. Meanwhile, Holmes sends Lily on an errand to police headquarters to keep her out of harm's way, but she catches up with Holmes, just as Lupin and Fujiko rocket by on a motorcycle, causing Lily to scream in recognition.
2	"Detective and Crook"; Transliteration: "Tantei to Akutō" (Japanese: 探偵と悪党)	Keiya Saitō	Takahiro Ōkura	Hiroyuki Yano	October 24, 2021	May 1, 2022
Lily faints after seeing Lupin, while he and Fujiko escape Zenigata. Holmes vows to catch Lupin and tells Lestrade how Lupin was involved in the death of his partner, John H. Watson, 10 years earlier. At their hideout, Lupin explains to the crew about the legend of the "Raven" society and its mysterious treasure, who are then surprised to learn his connection to Holmes. When Lily awakes, she tells Holmes that she remembers Lupin from her past. Zenigata and Yata inspect Faulkner's Black Drawing Room, where Lestrade offers to work together to capture Lupin. Holmes manages to track down Lupin and his crew in an abandoned building and warns him to stay away from Lily and leave London for good. He had also led Zenigata and the British police to the hideout, but Lupin destroys the building while he and his crew make their escape. Back at Holmes' house, Lily has a recollection of Lupin standing over the body of her dead father and holding a gun. Meanwhile, Albert is recovering in the hospital where his men tell him that Lupin has left England.
3	"Adventure Along the (Bogus) Transcontinental Railroad"; Transliteration: "Tairiku Ōdan Tetsudō (Uso) no Bōken" (Japanese: 大陸横断鉄道（嘘）の冒険)	Takahiko Usui	Masaki Tsuji	Hatsuki Tsuji	October 31, 2021 (Note: This episode aired at 1:00 a.m. JST, 5 minutes after the original air time on Nippon TV.)	May 8, 2022
In England, Lord Marquess hosts a party for railway enthusiasts on his vast estate which includes a replica railroad. Zenigata convinces NYPD's Inspector Queen that Lupin will be there to steal a valuable historic railway ticket, so he attends the party. Queen's nephews, Manfred Lee and Frederic Dannay, would-be detectives who are visiting from the United States, follow Fujko onto the Lord Marquess estate. Meanwhile, Morton, the Marquess' butler, kills the lord and pretends to be the Marquess. Working with Lupin's crew, Fujiko manages to steal the ticket, but she is caught by Morton's men who, after seemingly eating the ticket, tie her to the railway tracks as the train travels along on autopilot. Lupin, Zenigata, and the others, including Queen's nephews, race to her rescue before the train arrives and manage to save her. Morton is captured, while the real ticket is recovered by the nephews, as Fujiko's "thanks" for saving her.
4	"The Killers in the Diner"; Transliteration: "Dainā no Koroshiya-tachi" (Japanese: ダイナーの殺し屋たち)	Kazuhiro Soeta	Mamoru Oshii	Norihiro Naganuma	November 7, 2021	May 15, 2022
Disguised as well-dressed hitmen, Lupin and Jigen enter a bar where eight other assassins are there waiting. After spending time chatting with the freckle-faced waitress and eating dinner, which mostly contains pork, they reveal that they are there to kill a regular patron named Andre Anderson and recover a treasure he has stolen. Lupin offers to share the reward with the other assassins who have been hired by the same client, but they refuse. On Lupin's countdown, the waitress switches off the lights, resulting in a shoot-out leaving all the assassins except Lupin and Jigen dead. After Lupin discovers the real waitress and cook tied up and gagged in the kitchen, it is revealed that the waitress from earlier was actually Fujiko in disguise. Having escaped the shootout, Fujiko goes to Andre's apartment, and, after a lengthy discussion, apparently kills him. She obtains the treasure which is an original edition of an Ernest Hemingway anthology containing "The Killers" which was secretly used as an Ottendorf cipher codebook by the CIA for decades after they obtained all printed copies. The three conspirators then prepare to sell the book back to the CIA. This episode is presented as a reenactment of "The Killers", including the escape of the original thief.
5	"The Imperial City Dreams of Thieves, Part 1"; Transliteration: "Teito wa Dorobō no Yume o Miru Zenpen" (Japanese: 帝都は泥棒の夢を見る 前篇)	Nana Harada	Taku Ashibe	Hajime Kamegaki	November 14, 2021	May 22, 2022
Lupin is caught in a flash of blinding light and finds himself in Showa era Japan circa 1930. He finds that he is the thief "Golden Mask" being pursued by Inspector Namikoshi who looks like Zenigata. "Golden Mask" sets his sights on a national treasure from the Imperial Museum but he must contend with private detective extraordinaire, Kogoro Akechi and the "Black Lizard", who resembles Fujiko. "Black Lizard" has been hired by Colonel Daidoji, assisted by a Major who resembles Jigen and is armed with a Model 14 Nambu Pistol. Meanwhile, Ruriko Shigetomi, heiress of the Shigetomi department store, has recovered a centuries old automaton clock from Inner Mongolia and is transporting by train to Tokyo, assisted by the knife-wielding Sarantuya, whose family have protected the clock for generations. Lupin fails in his attempt to steal the clock on the train, and it is placed on display at the Shigetomi department store. While trying to solve the mystery of his Golden Mask identity, Lupin breaks into the department store where he encounters Ruriko, but they are suddenly interrupted by a slash from the sword of Goemon Ishikawa.
6	"The Imperial City Dreams of Thieves, Part 2"; Transliteration: "Teito wa Dorobō no Yume o Miru Kōhen" (Japanese: 帝都は泥棒の夢を見る 後篇)	Takashi Asami	Taku Ashibe	Hatsuki Tsuji	November 21, 2021	May 29, 2022
In the Shigetomi department store circa 1930, Goemon slashes wildly at Lupin who manages to escape while remarking that his sword is not Zantetsuken. Colonel Daidoji and Major Hongo arrive and snatch the key to the automaton clock from Sarantuya, who is also later revealed to be the heir to the Altan Khoto Kingdom. Daidoji's plan is for the Imperial Japanese Army to instill a puppet government in Inner Mongolia. Following a series of intersecting events, the key players in the drama, Ruriko, Sarantuya, Akechi, Black Lizard, and Lupin, find themselves surrounded by high mirror-like panels with a type of control panel in the center. Lupin enters a code and the group suddenly end up back in the automaton clock room, where he reunites with Goemon. Lupin finally remembers the truth: he and Goemon had infiltrated a modern research facility, but became trapped inside a virtual machine designed to extract the password to Lupin's hideout. He also reveals the code he entered enabled a self-destruction for the facility, forcing the researchers to free them and let them escape, as the rest of the virtual world disintegrates. As Lupin and Goemon escape, it is revealed that the facility was funded by Ruriko Shigetomi and the Showa era events were based on her memories. Later, during an excavation, a stone is uncovered showing engraved words that master thief Arséne Lupin, AKA the Golden Mask, was there in the 1930s.
7	"An Untold Tale"; Transliteration: "Katararezaru Jiken" (Japanese: 語られざる事件)	Pyeon-Gang Ho	Takahiro Ōkura	Pyeon-Gang Ho	November 28, 2021	June 5, 2022
While Albert d'Andrésy is questioning an informant about an assassin targeting Holmes, the informant is shot dead by the sniper. Zenigata meets up with Lestrade, where they drink the night away complaining about Holmes pursuing his own crime-busting agenda. While observing Holmes' house, Lupin is found by Zenigata, but they spot a sniper nearby and give chase. Lupin deduces the sniper is the mercenary Colonel Sebastian Moran who uses a high-powered air rifle. He then receives a phone call from Jigen who says that Moran was hired by a new power group led by "The Professor". While pinned down by Moran's gunfire, Lupin tells Zenigata about John Watson's death ten years earlier. Holmes was investigating the Ravens, and a former member named Horatio Clover offered information to Scotland Yard. However, he was gunned down by a Raven executioner which was witnessed by Watson and Lupin. During a struggle with the assassin, Watson was shot dead just before Lily Watson arrived to see Lupin standing over her father's body. Holmes soon arrived but he deduced that Lupin was not the killer. He then took Lily into his care but warned Lupin to stay away from her. As dawn breaks, Lupin and Zenigata corner Moran, who disparages the Ravens as a spent force and escapes. Zenigata is then revealed to be Holmes in disguise, while the real Zenigata has been with Lestrade the whole night. Holmes decides to take Lupin's advice and finally tell Lily the truth about her father's death. Later, Jigen recalls an encounter he had with Lily three years earlier.
8	"Last Bullet"; Transliteration: "Rasuto Buretto" (Japanese: ラスト・ブレット)	Akira Shimizu	Akio Higuchi	Osamu Nabeshima	December 5, 2021	June 12, 2022
Three years in the past, Jigen is involved in a shootout with an old nemesis, ex-CIA hitman Brad Roark, but because Jigen's aging revolver can no longer shoot magnum shells, he uses an old ploy to shoot Roark with ordinary bullets. While on a school excursion to an art gallery in Scotland, a kidnapper knocks out Lily Watson with chloroform. Fellow student, Kenny Howell, grabs the kidnapper before Lupin intercedes and chases him off. Lupin swears Kenny to secrecy and decides that he and Jigen will keep Lily under surveillance during her return to London, where Holmes is recovering from an accident. Lily is once again abducted by kidnappers but Roark intervenes under a nameless client's orders to capture or kill her. However, Jigen shoots the kidnappers from a distance and forces Roark to take cover. He then drives Lily himself, but when Roark eventually confronts them again, it is revealed that Lily is actually Kenny in disguise, acting as a decoy. A shootout commences between Jigen and Roark, where Jigen decides to risk everything on one magnum bullet, which successfully kills Roark, but also destroys his revolver and injures his hand in the process. The real Lily makes it to London with her teacher, Mr. Burton, under the watchful eye of Lupin, all without Holmes' knowledge. Later, Jigen has the K-frame of his revolver replaced with a custom version made by a gunsmith, extending its useful life.
9	"The Jet-Black Diamond"; Transliteration: "Shikkoku no Daiyamondo" (Japanese: 漆黒のダイヤモンド)	Yūji Kanzaki	Kanae Minato	Kōichi Chigira	December 12, 2021	June 19, 2022
The specialist treasure hunter calling herself Cherry lures Lupin to an "underground" auction of some treasure of the great pirate Zeke Barbatos who was active in Brazil 75 years ago. The treasure reportedly included the Jet-Black Diamond and Venus Ruby. At the auction, Lupin encounters an elderly woman who buys a kokeshi doll similar to his own which is part of the treasure. Lupin steals it and then returns it to the woman after extracting her scrap of Zeke's treasure map, but Fujiko swipes the pieces to track down the Jet-Black Diamond herself. The woman, her granddaughter, and Fujiko converge on the location of the treasure in Brazil, with Jigen and Goemon following suit while Lupin stays behind in London. A drone he pilots meets up with the women, as they learn the woman is actually Cherry, as well as the sister of Sakura, Zeke's lover, who committed suicide shortly after Zeke's execution. They meet at the foot of a tree where the flowers bloom every 75 years in the full moon, with Cherry leaving the two dolls at the base of the tree as a memorial to the two lovers, not interested in any treasure. Fujiko digs to find the diamond, but a scuffle with Zenigata reveals the box only contains pepper, as it was a valuable commodity 75 years ago and was referred to as the "Jet-Black Diamond".
10	"Darwin's Bird"; Transliteration: "Dāwin no Tori" (Japanese: ダーウィンの鳥)	Kazuhiro Soeta	Mamoru Oshii	Masatsugu Arakawa	December 19, 2021	June 26, 2022
Fujiko checks out the fossil of an archaeopteryx on display in the British Natural History Museum for a man who calls himself Mihail, Michael, or Miguel, on behalf of his lord who wants her to steal it. The specimen was uncovered in a quarry in Solnhofen, Germany in 1861, 2 years after Charles Darwin published On the Origin of Species. Mihail's employer believes that the three discovered fossils of archaeopteryx are the work of forger Karl Häberlein. Mihail is unconcerned whether the fossil is real or a fake, but wants her to steal the original which is sealed in a vault within the museum. Fujiko breaks into the museum's vault and Lupin follows her. They find what appears to be the original fossil, but Lupin opens a door into another chamber where a huge version of the fossil is attached to the wall. The sight of the object evokes the image of a fallen angel and Fujiko suspects that Mihail is the agent of God. She decides not to proceed with the contract.
11	"The Truth and The Raven"; Transliteration: "Shinjitsu to Watarigarasu" (Japanese: 真実とワタリガラス)	Mitsutaka Noshitani	Takahiro Ōkura	Hiroyuki Yano	December 26, 2021 (Note: Episodes 11 and 12 aired together as an hour special.)	July 10, 2022
Around midnight while walking home from a pub, Alex Jenkinson, a landshark who used aggressive tactics to acquire local property, is shot dead by someone he suspects is a Raven assassin. The next morning, local "Baker Street Irregulars" arrive and pub owner Derrick Barnes confirms Jenkinson's movements. Lupin's gang suspect the assassin also killed Lord Falkner, who was buying up local land. Holmes tells Lestrade and Zenigata that anyone interested in that land has died, and he offers a million pounds reward for the half of Falkner's poster held by Lupin. This prompts numerous bounty hunters to pursue Lupin, including Zenigata, and Lupin lets his half of the poster fall into his hands. Meanwhile, Holmes suspects the assassin also killed Watson and Faulkner, so takes Lily to the location of Watson's murder, hoping to jog her memory, but without success. He returns to investigate Faulkner's Black Drawing Room with Zenigata and is followed by Lily. Holmes encounters Lupin and they both deduce that the poster was a distraction and the real clue lays somewhere in the room. Because Faulkner spent all daylight hours working in the darkened room, they surmise that he was protecting something from the light. Lupin rips down the curtains, and as sunlight fills the room, it hits the spot where the poster was, revealing a Raven symbol before triggering a massive explosion.
12	"The Ghosts of Britain"; Transliteration: "Eikoku no Bōrei" (Japanese: 英国の亡霊)	Keiya Saitō	Takahiro Ōkura	Masayuki Kojima	December 26, 2021	July 17, 2022
Lupin, Holmes, Lily, and Zenigata survive the explosion, realizing the Black Drawing Room was a booby trap. Holmes deduces that the cheap ring Faulkner always wore is the key to uncovering the treasure. That night a man steals the ring and uses it to unlock a gravestone leading to a secret passageway containing the Raven's treasure. He is cornered by Holmes, accompanied by Lily and Lestrade, and Holmes recognizes him as Eliot. A gunfight ensues and Eliot is shot by Lupin, who had followed them, telling Lily that Eliot killed her father. Holmes and Lupin surprisingly shoot at each other, and in the commotion, Lily recalls that she saw Lestrade just before her father was murdered. Holmes had actually deduced this earlier and set the trap with Lupin to expose Lestrade as the treasure hunter. Lestrade then threatens to kill everyone with two hand bombs, however Lupin reveals the Raven's treasure is merely a collection of useless WWII bombs. The frustrated Lestrade escapes and jumps into the Thames River, detonating the bombs. Afterwards, Lupin reveals Watson's final request was for Holmes to watch over Lily, and sometime later, Holmes returns to taking on more high-profile cases with Lily as his partner. Lupin also meets the Baker Street boy James Moriarty, who is revealed to be the mysterious "Professor", warning Lupin to stay out of his way. Lupin decides that he has had enough of London and departs.
Witch and Gentleman
13	"An Invitation From the Past"; Transliteration: "Kako kara no Shōtaijō" (Japanese: 過去からの招待状)	Kazuhiro Soeta	Shigeru Murakoshi	Hiroyuki Yano	January 9, 2022	July 24, 2022
Lupin has set up his quarters in New York, but suffers from boredom until Fujiko tells him about a jewelry auction featuring treasures associated with classical myths. When he sees a large red jewel in the catalog which was stolen from his grandfather's vault by a female master thief, Lupin decides to steal it back. Lupin befriends a florist named Mattea who he dupes into delivering his electronic flying drone insects to the auction as part of his plan. However, during the auction, he is foiled by a heavily armed group of identical red-haired women who burst in and grab the treasures. Lupin gives chase, but during the battle the red jewel falls into the hands of the women's leader when he stops to save Mattea from falling debris. As the leader leaves with the jewel, Lupin explains to his gang that she knows he is connected to Tomoe, the thief who stole the jewel from his grandfather, and supposedly, his "mother".
14	"The Mirage Women"; Transliteration: "Shinkirō no Onna-tachi" (Japanese: 蜃気楼の女たち)	Kentarō Sugimoto	Shigeru Murakoshi	Hatsuki Tsuji	January 16, 2022	July 31, 2022
Lupin visits Mattea who is recovering at the hospital, although she is not surprised to learn his true identity. Fujiko arrives to reveal that the group of female thieves is called "Elvira" and their leader is Mercedes Camilo. She explains that their next target will be the Banco Alban Bank in Mexico within five days, but Lupin suspects he is the real objective. On the way, Lupin explains to Jigen and Goemon that Tomoe is not his biological mother, but a teacher assigned by his grandfather to see if he was worthy of the "Lupin" name. He considered her as a mother-figure, however she apparently stole his grandfather's treasure, but was caught and shot, falling to her death. On the day of the raid on Banco Alban, Elvira overwhelms Zenigata and the police force with tanks, successfully robbing the bank, but Jigen plants a tracker on them. Lupin and the gang break into Elvira's hideout, and after several attempts to outsmart each other, Lupin defeats Mercedes and reclaims his treasure. She claims that she was also trained by Tomoe, whom Lupin now suspects faked her own death. Zenigata arrests the Elvira gang, while Lupin allows Mercedes to live, however he vows to find out if Tomoe is alive and the truth about the night she apparently died.
15	"Wedding Bells Ring with the Sound of Gunfire"; Transliteration: "Shukufuku no Kane ni Hibike yo, Jūsei" (Japanese: 祝福の鐘に響けよ、銃声)	Takashi Asami	Akira Kindaichi	Kōichi Chigira	January 23, 2022	August 7, 2022
Lupin reveals to Jigen their next heist is to steal the "Tear of Marseille", a jewel whose existence was only recently revealed on the internet. It is to be given to Mylene Legrand, a local town doctor and the bride-to-be of Count Fernand Maistre. Jigen asks Lupin to pass on the heist, as sometime ago she had saved his life after finding him shot in an alley. They were immediately attracted to each other, but Jigen eventually left her behind because of his chosen lifestyle. In the lead-up to the wedding, Jigen sees a man that Lupin recognizes as the Jackal who specializes in kidnapping and ransom, and suspects that he is targeting Mylene. Jigen secretly watches over her, eventually locating and killing the Jackal's crew, including the Jackal's brother Jed, but the Jackal escapes. On the day of the wedding, Jigen provides encouragement to Fernand, and kills Jackal when he attempts to kill Mylene in revenge for his brother's death. Mylene later meets up with Lupin and reveals that she leaked the information about the Tear of Marseille, hoping to see Jigen one more time before getting married as she still cares for him. She gives Lupin the Tear as payment which he later gives to Jigen, only for him to throw it into the ocean.
16	"Samurai Collection"; Transliteration: "Samurai Korekushon" (Japanese: サムライ・コレクション)	Toshihiro Maeya	Tomoko Shinozuka	Jun'ichi Sakata	January 30, 2022	August 14, 2022
Gabby, a celebrity fashion designer whose collections are sold through auctions instead of the open market, returns to the spotlight after a five-year hiatus to present a new fashion line. She hires Goemon as a model after she rescues him during one of his training runs in the Arctic. While a complete amateur in the fashion business, Goemon finds new ways of improving his abilities through his modelling exercises, and Gabby becomes inspired through his eccentricities. Meanwhile, Lupin plans to nab Gabby's latest designs in return for the promise of a romantic night with Fujiko. At the night of the fashion show, Lupin sneaks on stage, leading to a scuffle with Goemon to prevent him from ruining the show. Lupin uses a large drone to suck the designs off the racks and the models' bodies, but Goemon destroys it, leaving him to be chased off by Zenigata. Despite its chaotic conclusion, and all the clothes sliced into pieces, the show is a great success, inspiring Gabby and her backer, Largerfeld, to plan a repeat performance.
17	"Win or Lose in 0.1 Seconds"; Transliteration: "Rei Ten Ichibyō ni Kakero" (Japanese: 0.1秒に懸けろ)	Hideki Tonokatsu	Akira Kindaichi	Jun'ichi Sakata	February 6, 2022 (Note: Episodes 17 and 18 aired together as an hour special at 1:15 a.m. JST, 20 minutes after the original air time on Nippon TV.)	August 21, 2022
Linfeng Wang, a former chief engineer at ICPO, who is completely obsessed and infatuated with Lupin, has formed Wangtic, a security firm which prides itself on its new "L System", designed to thwart even Lupin's most clever disguises. Wang issues a challenge to Lupin to steal a unique coin, the Flowing Hair Dollar, from her heavily guarded Wangtic headquarters. Lupin accepts, but in order to disable the L System, he and his gang have to shut down its four power supplies at the same. While they rehearse their synchronization for the shutdown, Wangtic runs a high rotation advertising campaign with an annoyingly catchy jingle. Despite their arguments while being unable to act in sync, the crew continue to practice. On the night of the challenge, Lupin arranges for a mass of cosplayers dressed as him and his gang to storm the building, using them as cover to reach the power generators. As Lupin's gang prepares the countdown, Wang jams their communications, but using Wangtic's own jingle's timing as their cue, they succeed in simultaneously shutting down the power and Lupin steals the coin. Lupin pays a final compliment to Wang before he and his gang make their getaway, pursued by an enthusiastic Zenigata who had anticipated Lupin's success.
18	"Fakes Attract Lies Part 1"; Transliteration: "Feiku ga Uso o Yobu Zenpen" (Japanese: フェイクが嘘を呼ぶ 前篇)	Hatsuki Tsuji	Shigeru Murakoshi	Hatsuki Tsuji	February 6, 2022	August 28, 2022
Lupin visits the florist shop where Mattea has returned to work, and she explains that she is planning a holiday. Lupin sees a news item about Ms. Hazel, Republic of Cotornica's rising politician who credits her missing private tutor, Tomoe, as the key to her success. Intrigued, Lupin takes his crew Cotornica to investigate and runs into Mattea. Lupin visits Hazel to ask about Tomoe, and while there, they receive a fake video of Hazel being present at the assassination of a captive. Lupin is photographed at her apartment causing a scandal for Hazel. Later, Lupin sees the photographer's vehicle and follows it to a kebab restaurant where he notices some shady characters. He follows them and finds Hazel's associate, Selim, working with a group plotting to discredit her, as Lupin takes all their data. He gives the information to Hazel who warns that he must not approach her again to maintain her reputation, so he leaves the country. Later, Zenigata visits Hazel's apartment and finds her shot dead, but suddenly the local police arrive and arrest him for her murder.
19	"Fakes Attract Lies Part 2"; Transliteration: "Feiku ga Uso o Yobu Kōhen" (Japanese: フェイクが嘘を呼ぶ 後篇)	Shigeki Awai Masahiko Komino	Shigeru Murakoshi	Hatsuki Tsuji	February 20, 2022 (Note: This episode aired at 1:05 a.m. JST, 10 minutes after the original air time on Nippon TV.)	September 4, 2022
Following Hazel's death, Cotornica's borders are closed and Zenigata is held in jail. Yata and Ariana review the evidence, and Ariana discovers that her tutor, Tomoe, also taught Hazel. They also learn that Selim is being questioned over an attempt to blackmail Hazel, but he did not kill her. They raid the paparazzo photographer who had been tailing Hazel and use copies of his photos to have Zenigata released. Later that night, Yata and Ariana spend a tender moment together, but then Ariana discovers a clue in one of the photos of someone familiar leaving Hazel's apartment. Early the next morning she meets with Mattea, and during their conversation, Ariana confirms her suspicion that Mattea is involved in Hazel's death. Ariana tries to arrest her, but Mattea stabs her and escapes. When Zenigata and Yata arrive, Ariana gives them a recording of her conversation with Mattea which she says must be sent to Lupin, and then collapses.
20	"Two Terrible Ladies"; Transliteration: "Futari no Akujo" (Japanese: 二人の悪女)	Fumio Maezono	Ayumi Shimo	Jun'ichi Sakata	February 27, 2022	September 11, 2022
While preparing for a date with Lupin, Fujiko receives an unexpected visit from an old associate, Amelia, a devil-may-care con artist. Despite their lackluster success rate, Amelia wants to team up with Fujiko again to steal a valuable necklace from a cult leader. They infiltrate the Church of Ayon on Atlas Island, only for Amelia to seemingly betray Fujiko. Fujiko then learns the leader is the former IT company president Grayson, who has a sick obsession for literally branding his "property", but was accidentally branded out his left eye during one of Amelia's bungled escapades. As Fujiko is about to be disfigured by Grayson with hot branding irons, Amelia turns the tables on him. She reveals that they have come to claim revenge against his old company's child trafficking operations, which included Amelia and her childhood friends who were sold into slavery and died. Meanwhile, Lupin hacks into Grayson's dark web marketing site in a plot coordinated with Fujiko, and he scrambles Grayson's AI system which incinerates him. Some months later, Amelia gives birth to a baby boy.
21	"Welcome to the Island of Bubbles"; Transliteration: "Utakata no Shima e Yōkoso" (Japanese: うたかたの島へようこそ)	Kiyoshi Egami	Tomoko Shinozuka	Kōichi Chigira	March 6, 2022	September 25, 2022
Muru, a young woman with romantic ideals who lives in the village of Mitten, is telling stories to local fishermen about the village's mermaid legends when there is a pile-up at the local drawbridge which involves Lupin's car. While Lupin recovers from whiplash and waits for the bridge to be repaired, Muru is captivated by the beauty of Fujiko, who she thinks looks like a mermaid, and follows her and the rest of Lupin's gang, concocting romantic tales in her mind as she observes them, imagining that the three men are all Fujiko's suitors. She arranges for them to meet on a full moon night, planning that each of them will compete for the love of Fujiko, whom she convinced to wear a mermaid costume. The plan falls apart when only Lupin openly declares his love, but is slapped down by Fujiko. When Muru learns that Lupin is the famous thief, she begins another tale involving Fujiko, and then herself, as a femme fatale.
22	"My Mother's Documents"; Transliteration: "Watashi no Mama no Kiroku" (Japanese: 私のママの記録)	Kōichi Chigira	Kōichi Chigira	Kōichi Chigira	March 13, 2022	October 2, 2022
A young woman named Finn Clarke travels to Revonland in the Arctic to learn more about her mother who died after giving birth to her 16 years ago to the day. She stays with Daniel and Anna who had watched over her mother, Mariel, after she suddenly left for America. Using her mother's diary and pictures, Finn learns that in high school, Mariel had a crush on a football player named Sean and dated another boy named Allen. She finds some cassettes recorded by Mariel and decides to reveal them publicly as a webcast called "Finn's Room" which are heard by both Lupin and Mattea. The tapes reveal that Mariel split with Sean and became pregnant by Allen, with Tomoe using hypnotic suggestion to make her believe they were always close to each other. The final tape reveals in a call with Sean that Allen had assaulted Mariel, with surveillance footage at the time showing the two boys arguing and then being shot by another of Tomoe's "students", who then kills herself on her instructions. As Finn goes into shock, Lupin rushes in and consoles her, while wondering about Tomoe's motivation. As he leaves, he encounters Zenigata, who was waiting for him.
23	"The Memories of a Beloved Witch"; Transliteration: "Itoshi no Majo no Kioku" (Japanese: 愛しの魔女の記憶)	Hideki Tonokatsu	Shigeru Murakoshi	Eiji Suganuma	March 20, 2022	October 9, 2022
Lupin, Goemon, and Jigen meet with Zenigata, revealing he's chasing Mattea, who apparently stabbed Ariana and killed Hazel, to Lupin's shock. Zenigata shows him Arianna's recording, and when Lupin hears the words from his mother's poem containing a hypnotic suggestion, he attacks Zenigata and his colleagues, and escapes with Mattea's help. Zenigata interviews Mercedes in prison about Tomoe and discovers a link to Mahiko Village, Jigen and Goemon seek help from the Professor, who wants to learn more about Lupin's past, and Fujiko attempts and fails to reason with Lupin. As the hypnotized Lupin makes his way toward Tomoe, he starts to believe that she is his true biological mother, forced to hide it by his grandfather, and that the contents she stole from his safe was proof of the parentage. He arrives in the village and greets an aging Tomoe, who explains her death was faked by convincing a dupe to take her place. Mattea then arrives and shoots Lupin who falls over the balcony. As Tomoe stands by unsympathetically, she explains to Mattea that she tutored women from different countries to carry a code in different languages that would lead Lupin, her son, back to her. As Mattea prepares to kill Tomoe, she is surprised when Lupin returns after surviving the gunshot, as the two face down.
24	"What Crooks Love"; Transliteration: "Akutō ga Aisu Mono" (Japanese: 悪党が愛すもの)	Kazuhiro Soeta	Shigeru Murakoshi	Eiji Suganuma	March 27, 2022	October 16, 2022
Lupin and Mattea's fight is broken up by Jigen, Goemon, and Fujiko's arrival. The three demand proof that Tomoe is really Lupin's mother, so she reveals the box is located in the original safe. Lupin then reveals that he's been free of her brainwashing for a while, thanks to his strong memories and bond with his crew bringing him back to his senses, and had come up with the plan to get her to reveal the box's location right after getting shot. He figures out the box, rather than containing proof of Tomoe's parentage, contains information regarding his true roots. Tomoe laughs maniacally, stating that she will continue to use more women and methods to get Lupin to become hers, causing Mattea to snap and try to kill her, only for Lupin to shoot her first. As Tomoe lays dying, Mattea becomes further enraged due to Tomoe taking her life from her, and still intending to fight Lupin, which he agrees to. During their fight, Zenigata arrives, revealing Arianna has just regained consciousness, and after Lupin tells Mattea to decide by her own standards how she'll be a crook, she agrees and is arrested. Lupin and the crew break into the safe to receive the box, only to barely survive one last death trap from Tomoe. He realizes the box was on her the entire time, and after reclaiming it and burning down the house, he throws it into the fire, deciding that his present with everyone is more important than learning his roots. Later, Mercedes breaks out of prison, no longer caring about surpassing Lupin, and Zenigata resumes his chase with Lupin and his crew.

== Home media release ==
=== Japanese ===
VAP (Japan, Region 2/A)
Vol.	Discs	Episodes	Release date	Ref.
Box I	4	1–12 + Episode 0	February 23, 2022	
Box II	4	13–24	June 22, 2022	

=== English ===
Sentai Filmworks (North America, Region 1/A)
Name	Episodes	Release date	Ref.
Part 6	1–24 + Episode 0	January 24, 2023	

== See also ==
- Lupin III
- List of Lupin III Part I episodes
- List of Lupin III Part II episodes
- List of Lupin III Part III episodes
- List of Lupin III: The Woman Called Fujiko Mine episodes
- List of Lupin III Part IV episodes
- List of Lupin III Part 5 episodes
- List of Lupin III television specials
