= List of Lupin the 3rd Part 5 episodes =

Japanese anime television series

Lupin the 3rd Part 5
- Season 5
- Cover art of the first DVD & Blu-ray volume as released in Japan
- No. of episodes: 24 + OVA

Release
- Original network: Nippon TV
- Original release: April 4 – September 18, 2018

Series chronology
- ← Previous; Part IV: The Italian Adventure Next → Part 6

Lupin the 3rd Part 5 (Japanese: ルパン三世 PART5, Hepburn: Rupan Sansei Pāto Faibu), also known as Lupin the 3rd Part V: Misadventures in France, is an anime television series in the Lupin the Third franchise, produced at Telecom Animation Film and directed by Yūichirō Yano and written by Ichirō Ōkouchi. It is the sixth anime adaptation of the Lupin III series created by Monkey Punch. The series aired from April 4 to September 18, 2018, on Japanese television, and was simulcast with English subtitles by Crunchyroll.

Part V was produced at Telecom Animation Film, and was directed by Yūichirō Yano, reprising his role from 2015's Part IV. It was written by Ichirō Ōkouchi alongside Gō Zappa, Daisuke Sakō, Kazushige Nojima, Takahiro Okura, Yuniko Ayana, Keiichi Sigsawa and Shatner Nishida, and featured character designs by Hisao Yokobori. The series was announced at Japan Expo in Paris in 2017, and aired for 24 episodes from April 4, 2018 (Note: The series is billed as premiering on April 3, 2018 at "25:29", which is effectively April 4 at 1:29 a.m. JST.) to September 18, 2018, on Nippon TV, Nittele Plus, KNB, STV, CTV, FBS, SDT, ytv, TSB, and NKT. It is also streamed by Hulu in Japan, and simulcast by Crunchyroll in Japanese with English subtitles. It will be released on home video in the United Kingdom and Ireland by Anime Limited. In the United States, Adult Swim's Toonami programming block premiered the series on June 16, 2019. (Note: Adult Swim lists the series as premiering on June 15, 2019 at 1:00 a.m. EDT/PDT, which is effectively June 16.)

The first Japanese DVD/Blu-ray set containing the first five episodes of the anime was released on July 25, 2018. It includes a memorial OVA episode titled "Is Lupin Still Burning?" to celebrate the 50th anniversary of the manga. The episode was directed by Jun Kawagoe, with Monkey Punch as general director and character designs by Hisao Horikoshi and Satoshi Hirayama. Its title is a reference to the debut episode of the first Lupin the Third anime series and effectively acts as a remake, but features other enemies such as Kyosuke Mamo, Sandayu Momochi, Pycal, and Stoneman.

== Episode list ==
No.	Title	Directed by	Written by	Original release date	English air date	Ref.
1	"The Girl in the Twin Towers"; Transliteration: "Tsuin Tawā no Shōjo" (Japanese: 地下塔（ツインタワー）の少女)	Keiko Oyamada	Ichirō Ōkouchi	April 4, 2018	June 16, 2019	
Lupin decides to steal digital currency from Marco Polo on the dark web and enlists the aid of the developer of the security system of the bank: Ami. With Ami's help, they successfully transfer a fortune into Lupin's account, but almost immediately upon their return to their hideout, Zenigata and his men surround the place. They discover that Zenigata easily found them because a new online game, "Arrest Lupin III" has gone viral with people posting sightings of Lupin. A chase ensues, with Lupin becoming increasingly frustrated at the intense pursuit.
2	"The Lupin Game"; Transliteration: "Rupan Gēmu" (Japanese: ルパン・ゲーム)	Makoto Ōga	Ichirō Ōkouchi	April 11, 2018	June 23, 2019	
The chase continues, with Lupin, Daisuke, Goemon and Ami arriving at an airport. They steal an electric car, but become trapped in a hangar by Zenigata and surrounded by the police. Within the hangar is an AW609 airplane, and with Ami's hacking skills, and the energy from the electric car battery, they start the plane and escape. They then board a cruise ship to Bwanda which is not an ICPO member nation so Zenigata cannot touch them. While there Ami wanders off and is attacked by street thugs, but is rescued by Lupin. They discuss her relationship with the team and Lupin says that she should stay with them for protection from Marco Polo. Suddenly they come under attack from bounty hunters, since there is now a new online game betting on the day Lupin will die.
3	"The Killers Gather in the Wasteland"; Transliteration: "Koroshi-ya wa Kōya ni Tsudou" (Japanese: 殺し屋は荒野に集う)	Taku Yamada; Keiko Oyamada	Ichirō Ōkouchi	April 18, 2018	June 30, 2019	
Ami and Lupin are trapped on a beach by three bounty hunters, but he shoots his way out. They are then followed by a quadcopter feeding images of their movements into the online Marco Polo game, Happy Deathday. They then become cornered in a car manufacturing plant by the Rat Clan, but Ami accesses the German CPS (Cyber Physical System) to use the building's systems to protect her and Lupin. They escape in a partly-built car, but Ami is shot. Meanwhile, Zenigata decides to go on holiday, to Bwanda. While Lupin's team remove the bullet from her arm, Ami tells them about her past. Lupin decides to fight rather than flee and announces online that he is at the ruins of an old town. Lupin figures that each bounty hunter group wants him left alive until the day they bet he will die, causing a deadly competition between them. As their numbers diminish, Daisuke and Goemon eliminate the survivors. Lastly, the leader of the Rat Clan and Lupin face off in a shoot-out, but Lupin wins with a gun hidden in his shoe. Finally Fujiko parachutes down, hoping to be the one to kill Lupin.
4	"Zenigata Stands Tall and the Desert Sands Fall"; Transliteration: "Zenigata no Hokori to Sabaku no Hokori" (Japanese: 銭形の誇りと砂漠の埃)	Makoto Ōga	Ichirō Ōkouchi	April 25, 2018	July 7, 2019	
Just as Fujiko is about to shoot Lupin and collect the 50 million Bitmoney reward, Zenigata arrives by car and rescues him and Ami so he can take them across the border and arrest Lupin. They come under attack from a Bwandan military helicopter, but just manage to escape. Working together against their pursuers, the three of them make their way to the border, but as they approach the border fence, they come under attack from a sniper. Zenigata takes Ami across the border to where his assistant, Yatagarasu, is waiting, while Lupin decoys the sniper. Although the two policemen make smoke with a grass fire to camouflage Lupin, he appears to be shot in the head. The Happy Deathday game is declared over and the winner is announced.
5	"A Crook's Resolve"; Transliteration: "Akutō no Kakugo" (Japanese: 悪党の覚悟)	Keiko Oyamada	Ichirō Ōkouchi	May 2, 2018	July 14, 2019	
After Lupin's publicized demise, Ami is taken in by Zenigata, who has been demoted to narcotics for aiding and then losing Lupin. Soon after receiving a letter from Goemon, Ami contacts Marco Polo and proceeds to their headquarters in order to work out a deal. Marco Polo's CEO, Chuck Glay, instead catches her in a deathtrap, threatening to kill her unless she spills everything about Lupin, including the whereabouts of the money he purloined from Marco Polo. However, this scenario is revealed as a trap set by Lupin for Glay and his fellow instigators of the Happy Deathday game, using Ami's hacking expertise and the aid of his associates Jigen, Goemon and Fujiko. Zenigata, who knew Lupin was too clever to be killed so easily, collars Glay for drug dealing, and Ami, inspired by her experiences, enrolls at a girls boarding school to catch up on the real life she has missed.
6	"Lupin vs. the Smart Safe"; Transliteration: "Rupan tai Tensai Kinko" (Japanese: ルパン対天才金庫)	Nobuo Tomizawa; Taku Yamada	Daisuke Sakō	May 9, 2018	July 21, 2019	
In order to save their family workshop from foreclosure, a young inventor suggests to his brainless older brother that Lupin may be the answer to their financial problem. They build a smart safe for the Greater Tokyo Bank which can only opened by someone with no brainpower, as a special challenge to Lupin, the world's smartest thief. Vexed by the resilience of this obstacle, Jigen, Fujiko and Goemon begin to implement a sadistic regime of sleep deprivation, beating and exercise to kill off Lupin's brain cells. However, at the publicized event of the safe's opening, Lupin instead consumes many blueback fish, boosting his brains so that the safe's IQ counter overflows to zero, thus opening the safe. While the contest ends in a draw, the brothers become celebrities and begin selling canned fish, recovering their property.
7	"His Name is Albert"; Transliteration: "Sono Na wa Arubēru" (Japanese: その名はアルベール)	Taku Yamada; Keiko Oyamada	Gō Zappa	May 16, 2018	July 28, 2019	
Lupin is hired by his old friend Gaston to steal a certain painting from the vault of Mr. B, a compulsive art collector. The painting is a Picasso forgery ostensibly painted by Gaston's grandchild. Lupin succeeds in his heist, but he and Jigen end up being chased by the DGES. Lupin discovers that the painting is the hiding-place for a notebook containing information about sensitive crimes hushed up by the French police, evidence which would topple a number of high-level persons if its contents went public. Lupin then finds that the Gaston who hired him was an impostor, as the real one died a month ago. A clue reveals the involvement of Albert d'Andrésy, an individual from Lupin's past that he never wanted to see again.
8	"Who Has the Black Notebook?"; Transliteration: "Kuroi Techō wa Dare no Te ni" (Japanese: 黒い手帳は誰の手に)	Makoto Ōga	Gō Zappa	May 23, 2018	August 4, 2019	
At Gaston's grave, Lupin and Jigen encounter Camille Bardot, an ex-investigator with a phenomenal photographic memory and an old acquaintance of Gaston. After receiving a telephonic challenge from Albert, the three of them find themselves targeted by a number of assassins. Mortally wounded, Bardot reveals that he aided Gaston in copying the original black notebook in the hopes that, at the right time, justice could be served against the perpetrators, but in turn they were ruthlessly hunted by DGES director Guillaume for it. Realizing that Albert set him up to gain possession of the notebook, Lupin returns to Paris to challenge him; but despite his precautions, Albert shoots Lupin a number of times, and recovers the notebook.
9	"The Man Who Abandoned "Lupin""; Transliteration: ""Rupan" o Suteta Otoko" (Japanese: "ルパン"を捨てた男)	Nobuo Tomizawa	Gō Zappa	May 30, 2018	August 11, 2019	
Before Albert's triumph is complete, Lupin is rescued by Jigen and Goemon, and the notebook is snatched from him by assassin-for-hire José and his minions. While recovering, Lupin reveals that Albert used to be his partner years ago but, not being satisfied with "small-time" thefts, turned away from Lupin to become the shadow ruler of France. Meanwhile, with the presidential elections approaching, José uses the book as leverage against the government, allowing terrorists to wreak havoc with impunity in order to swing public favor toward his patron, the right-winged election candidate Calvess. He also has his gang pursue Lupin and his friends because of their knowledge of the book's contents. With their respective interests at stake, Lupin and Albert join forces against their common enemy.
10	"Thief and Thief"; Transliteration: "Dorobō to Dorobō" (Japanese: 泥棒と泥棒)	Yasuo Tsuchiya	Gō Zappa	June 6, 2018	August 18, 2019	
After forcing the DGES Director General to reveal everything he knows about José, Lupin and Albert, assisted by Jigen and Goemon, storm the chief assassin's chateau and fight their way past Jóse's henchmen. When they find him and bring him down, Jóse, a cyborg, kills himself with an implanted bomb, but Lupin manages to retrieve the notebook. Despite Albert's final attempt to steal it back, Lupin retains his hold on it, and the two part ways with their past relationship (somewhat) restored. After Calvess and the DGES Director General are left defeated, Lupin re-buries the notebook in Gaston's grave.
11	"Get Pablo's Collection"; Transliteration: "Paburo Korekushon o Hashire" (Japanese: パブロ・コレクションを走れ)	Takumi Dōyama	Ichirō Ōkouchi	June 13, 2018	August 25, 2019	
Just before New Year's Day, Lupin remembers a former caper in which he and his gang attempted to grab the legendary collection of Pablo, a notorious drug kingpin who disappeared in the South American jungle. Eventually they discovered Pablo's secret hideaway for his collection of first-class vintage cars but found themselves challenged by a car which was strangely invulnerable to their attacks. Lupin dared his opponent to a race across Pablo's old jungle race track and won; the challenger was revealed to be the ghost of Pablo himself, and his car collection, long since overcome by degradation, to be nothing but scrap metal. In addition, they were hunted by Pablo's surviving family members, who were after the collection themselves, and their corrupt Brazilian Army cohorts. Although initially intent on fleeing on their own, Lupin, Jigen and Goemon ended up battling their pursuers together, while Fujiko just barely made her escape alone.
12	"The Extravagance of Ishikawa Goemon the Thirteenth"; Transliteration: "Jū San-Daime Ishikawa Goemon Sanzai Su" (Japanese: 十三代目石川五ェ門散財ス)	Yasuo Tsuchiya	Kazushige Nojima	June 20, 2018	September 1, 2019	
Goemon is coerced by Lupin into winning the confidence of the young woman Chloé Cazal. She was apparently a close friend of the late Belgian millionaire André Regnie, who gave her an immensely valuable gem necklace made before the Russian Revolution, which has made Chloé a target for the descendants of its original owners. While looking for her in the town of Sirena (and struggling with the attention of a local Anicon's visitors), Goemon befriends a boy named Jean who lives in Chloé's neighborhood. He moves into Jean's parents' hotel to watch over her, spending all his money on expenses and fending off several hired assassins in the process. However, Goemon later discovers that the girl is actually Chloé's daughter Inés, and that her necklace is a forgery. Inés had acted as bait to enable her mother to sell the real necklace. In the end, with no money left, Goemon asks to stay with Inés to work off his accumulated hotel bill.
13	"The Bow, The Princess, and the Terrorist"; Transliteration: "Yu to Jo to Terorisuto" (Japanese: 弓と王女とテロリスト)	Keiko Oyamada	Ichirō Ōkouchi	July 3, 2018	September 8, 2019	
As Ami tries to fit into boarding school in Annecy, she befriends fellow misfit Princess Dolma Sinha. Lupin's next target is the Bloody Teardrop, a national treasure of the south-east Asian kingdom of Padar which is currently worn by Dolma. However, a terrorist group calling itself the Whales of Liberation occupies the school and takes the students and teachers (including Fujiko, who has infiltrated the institute for the jewel) hostage. Fujiko frees Ami, and they team up to defeat them from within, aided by Lupin's gang who have also discovered the terrorists' presence. However, one of the teachers reveals himself as McGuire, a CIA special agent, who prepares to spirit Dolma away, stating that Padar is in danger.
14	"How To Steal A Kingdom"; Transliteration: "Ōkoku no Nusumi-Kata" (Japanese: 王国の盗み方)	Keiko Oyamada	Ichirō Ōkouchi	July 11, 2018	September 15, 2019	
Padar society is divided between reformists led by the King and traditionalist elements led by the High Priest who opposes the country's advancement into the high-tech age. Lupin and company travel to Padar to track down Princess Dolma and steal the Bloody Teardrop, as does Fujiko with a grudging Ami in tow. As they all investigate the princess' whereabouts, they stumble right into an imminent coup d'état planned by the High Priest and covertly supported by Padar's army and the American government. Their plan is to depose the King and install Dolma as a puppet ruler. Lupin and Ami sneak into the royal palace to rescue Dolma, but as Lupin turns his back, he is suddenly shot by one of the princess' arrows.
15	"Her Relationship With Lupin"; Transliteration: "Rupan to Kanojo no Kankei" (Japanese: ルパンと彼女の関係)	Keiko Oyamada	Ichirō Ōkouchi	July 18, 2018	September 22, 2019	
Betrayed by Dolma, Lupin and Ami escape with the aid of Fujiko, who has also claimed the Bloody Teardrop. King Rajahara Sinha has gone into hiding, whereupon the traditionalists declare martial law in the city in order to capture him and force him to abdicate. It turns out that McGuire, a native of a country destroyed by civil war, was originally tasked with assassinating the princess but switched sides in order to prevent the same fate occurring to Padar. Dolma reveals that she decided to join the traditionalists and hopefully defeat them from within, knowing that she would not stand a chance without the support of her people. Fujiko and Ami evade the army with the wounded Lupin in their care, but Fujiko soon abandons the two to fend for themselves. Just before they can be captured, King Sinha, assisted by the Shake Hands Corporation, stages a counter-revolution. At that critical moment, Fujiko demands that Lupin state his true feelings for her.
16	"Let's Talk About First Loves"; Transliteration: "Hatsukoi no Hanashi o Shou" (Japanese: 初恋の話をしょう)	Keiko Oyamada	Ichirō Ōkouchi	July 25, 2018	October 6, 2019	
As Ami and Lupin, Jigen and Goemon converge on the royal palace, King Sinha regains control of Padar. The High Priest attempts to flee and establish an independent regime, planning to crown Princess Dolma in another country with a fake Bloody Teardrop, exposing his true ambitions for personal power. Lupin and Ami arrive and try to convince Dolma to join them. With his men disarmed by Jigen and Goemon, the High Priest makes a desperate attempt to cut a deal with Lupin, which Ami secretly broadcasts across the internet and public channels, causing the High Priest to lose his remaining allies. Dolma takes charge of Padar, publicly solidifying its sovereignty against outside influences and reuniting her people. Later Ami tells Lupin that she loves him, while Fujiko avoids telling Zenigata about her true feelings for Lupin.
17	"Introducing Detective Jim Barnett the Third"; Transliteration: "Tantei Jimu Bānetto Sansei no Aisatsu" (Japanese: 探偵 ジム・バーネット三世の挨拶)	Hitomi Ezoe	Takahiro Ōkura	August 1, 2018	October 13, 2019	
Countess Isabelle de Maunbassant, an old acquaintance of Lupin, has invited him to catch the murderer of her husband Philippe, offering him her husband's emerald ring as a reward. She invited the three suspects to her chateau in order to set a trap for the culprit: gem collector Frederick Autorett, the count's nephew Allan Dubois and failed businessman Pierre Schmidt. However, in the midst of her announcement, a blackout hits the chateau and the Countess is fatally shot. Just before she dies, she seals off the chateau, giving Lupin time until dawn to find the murderer. Posing as Jim Barnett, a private eye, and assisted by Isabelle's maid Marie, Lupin quickly finds and exposes the culprits: Allan Dubois and his twin brother, who secretly entered the chateau and committed the murder. With the case solved, Lupin respectfully leaves the ring with the Countess and invites Marie to join him in a prospective career change as a private investigator.
18	"Fujiko's Gift"; Transliteration: "Fujiko no Okimiyage" (Japanese: 不二子の置きみやげ)	Hiroya Saitō	Yuniko Ayana	August 8, 2018	October 20, 2019	
One day, Lupin finds his hotel room's toilet clogged. The resulting sanitary restriction, their need for secrecy, and Goemon's strict preference for Japanese cuisine creates friction among Lupin's gang, which is not helped when Fujiko unexpected appears, apparently let in by a drunk Lupin the previous night. While they wait for the plumber, Fujiko begins to act secretively about the bathroom, and they suspect one of her usual schemes against them. The situation becomes more complicated when a passing Zenigata is attracted by the smell of Goemon's cooking and pays a brief visit. In the end, it transpires that Fujiko had dropped by for a special anniversary between herself and Lupin, complete with a gift which she hid in the toilet's water tank, inadvertently causing the blockage.
19	"A 7.62 mm Mirage"; Transliteration: "Nana-ten Roku-nen-ni Miri no Mirāju" (Japanese: 7.62mmのミラージュ)	Masaki Utsunomiya	Keiichi Sigsawa	August 15, 2018	October 27, 2019	
Lupin is "invited" by a psychotic millionaire named Zylberstein, one of his old acquaintances, to a solitary chess game for life and death. To increase the thrill, Zylberstein has hired an infamous female sniper named Mirage, a former partner of Jigen, to kill Lupin during the game. This results in a deadly hide-and-snipe match between Jigen and Mirage amidst a ruined mountain city, which ends when Jigen manages to critically damage Mirage's rifle just as she is taking aim at Lupin and the resulting ricochet hits Zylberstein instead. Lupin and Jigen discover the sniper is Mirage's daughter, who took the job to finance her sick mother's transfer to a better hospital. Lupin leaves the monetary stake Zylberstein left him (in case Lupin won the game) to Mirage's daughter, and Jigen dissuades her from pursuing a mercenary's life.
20	"Zenigata, Gentleman Thief"; Transliteration: "Kaitō Zenigata" (Japanese: 怪盗銭形)	Hatsuki Tsuji	Shatner Nishida	August 22, 2018	November 3, 2019	
Lupin, Jigen and Goemon take a trip to one of their old haunts in Russia to carry out some easy heists. To their surprise, they find another party of thieves already raiding the same targets with their old enemy Zenigata among their ranks. When Lupin talks with Zenigata, he finds that the latter has alcoholic amnesia from a massive drinking bout after another failure to catch Lupin. Zenigata has adopted the alias "Monety" and the modus operandi of his old nemesis Lupin while trying to uncover his lost identity. Unwilling to leave Zenigata in that condition, Lupin and company intercept Zenigata at the site of his next heist. When Lupin and Zenigata escape the crime scene together, the encounter finally snaps Zenigata's memory back into place, and to everyone's relief their relationship returns to its usual state.
21	"An Outdated Master Thief"; Transliteration: "Jidaiokure no Dai Dorobō" (Japanese: 時代遅れの大泥棒)	Yasuo Tsuchiya	Ichirō Ōkouchi	August 28, 2018	November 10, 2019	
Enzo Bron, the president of the global IT company Shake Handz, officially presents his company's new app called PeopleLog, a service linking facial recognition with global databases to create publicly accessible personal profiles. Lupin and company soon find that PeopleLog has become widely used to check people's identities, making it impossible for them to appear in public and easy for the police and Lupin's enemies to track his movements. Also, the apparent reliability of PeopleLog easily sways public opinion, and the world's governments become concerned that the app may cause political control to slip from their hands. As Lupin and Jigen head to rejoin Goemon, who has retreated into the mountains, they encounter Zenigata, who tells them that Fujiko has been captured by Enzo.
22	"Answer Me, Zantetsuken"; Transliteration: "Kotaeyo Zantetsuken" (Japanese: 答えよ斬鉄剣)	Keiko Oyamada	Ichirō Ōkouchi	September 4, 2018	November 17, 2019	
PeopleLog has stirred doubts within Goemon about whether Lupin sees him as an equal partner, but he still rejoins Lupin, Jigen and Ami to infiltrate the headquarters of Shake Handz on Olig Island in the Republic of Maul. Ami initiates a massive DDoS on the Shake Handz network system to mask their movements, but Enzo has anticipated this event and executes a counterattack. Goemon, left behind to cover the team's retreat, is challenged by Enzo, who fans Goemon's lingering doubts about his relationship with Lupin. Just as Lupin and Ami are about to liberate Fujiko, Goemon intervenes, demanding a duel to clarify things between them. The confrontation leaves Lupin critically wounded, and Ami pleads with Enzo – whom she knows to be her father – to save Lupin's life.
23	"Just Then, An Old Buddy Said Something"; Transliteration: "Sonotoki, Furuku kara no Aibō ga Itta" (Japanese: その時、古くからの相棒が言った)	Yasuo Tsuchiya	Ichirō Ōkouchi	September 11, 2018	November 24, 2019	
Enzo is triumphant about capturing Lupin III, but coldly disregards the reappearance of his long-lost daughter Ami. Zenigata and Yatagarasu take the wounded Lupin and the remorseful Goemon into custody, while Fujiko remains Enzo's willing prisoner, secure in her faith that Lupin will return for her. Although hunted by the police, Jigen later intercepts the prison transport carrying Lupin and Goemon and frees them using a sub-armory of weapons stashed in his car. However, despite the technological odds against him, Lupin refuses to reject his lifestyle as a master thief, and instead seeks refuge in the Grand Duchy of Cagliostro. Hidden below the ruined castle, Lupin turns the tables against Enzo by using PeopleLog to air the dirty laundry of the world's governments. As Shake Handz begins to suffer from the first wave of repercussions, Lupin and his friends initiate the first phase of their final strike.
24	"Viva Lupin the Third"; Transliteration: "Rupansansei wa Eien ni" (Japanese: ルパン三世は永遠に)	Yūichirō Yano	Ichirō Ōkouchi	September 18, 2018	December 8, 2019	
When Enzo refuses to take down Lupin's PeopleLog posts, the United States and its allies launch an all-out attack on Shake Handz to prevent a worldwide political crisis. Calling on the aid of his old friends Rebecca Rosselini and Diana Archer, Lupin storms the Shake Handz headquarters to save Fujiko and Ami. Enzo is taken completely by surprise, shaking his faith in his creation. Lupin gives Fujiko his long over-due answer concerning their relationship, saying that he loves her and takes off his own mask. The four of them escape the collapsing building, during which Enzo renews his family bond with Ami. The series concludes with the world returning to normal, and Lupin's fame boosted by his recent exploits. Albert flees with Enzo's assistant Ling to exploit PeopleLog's capacities for his own purposes, while Ami and Enzo are sheltered by Zenigata, who gladly continues his never ending chase of Lupin and his gang.

== Home media release ==
=== Japanese ===
VAP (Japan, Region 2/A)
Vol.	Episodes	Release date	Ref.
1	1–5 + OVA	July 25, 2018	
2	6–10	August 22, 2018	
3	11–15	September 19, 2018	
4	16–20	October 24, 2018	
5	21–24	November 21, 2018	

=== English ===
Discotek Media (North America, Region 1/A)
Name	Discs	Episodes	Release date	Ref.
Part V	3	1–24 + OVA	October 26, 2021	

== See also ==
- Lupin III
- List of Lupin III Part I episodes
- List of Lupin III Part II episodes
- List of Lupin III Part III episodes
- List of Lupin III: The Woman Called Fujiko Mine episodes
- List of Lupin III Part IV episodes
- List of Lupin III Part 6 episodes
- List of Lupin III television specials
