= List of Lupin the 3rd Part IV: The Italian Adventure episodes =

Lupin the 3rd Part IV: The Italian Adventure
- Season 3
- Cover art of the first DVD & Blu-ray volume as released in Japan
- No. of episodes: 26

Release
- Original network: Italia 1 (Italy); Nippon TV (Japan)
- Original release: August 30 – November 30, 2015 (Italy)

Series chronology
- ← Previous; Part III: The Pink Jacket Adventures Next → Part V: Misadventures in France

Lupin the 3rd Part IV: The Italian Adventure, also known simply as Lupin the 3rd (Japanese: ルパン三世, Hepburn: Rupan Sansei) or Lupin the Third Part IV (Japanese: ルパン三世 PART IV, Hepburn: Rupan Sansei Pāto Fō), is the fifth incarnation of TMS Entertainment's long-running anime television adaptation of Lupin III manga. The series received its world premiere in Italy on August 30, 2015, on the Italia 1 channel, (Note: Italia 1 listed the series premiere as airing on August 30, 2015 at 21:25 (CEST)) and a preview screening at Concordia theater in San Marino on August 29, 2015. The Japanese premiere was on October 1, 2015, on NTV and the series was made available on the J:Com and Hulu services in Japan on October 21. It ran for 26 episodes in Italy and 24 episodes in Japan. The opening theme for the Italian version of the series, "Lupin, un ladro in vacanza" (Lupin, a thief on holiday) is performed by Italian talent show hip-hop singer Moreno featuring Italian anime and cartoons themes veteran Giorgio Vanni. The opening theme for the Japanese version of the series "Theme from Lupin III 2015" is composed by Yuji Ohno and performed by You & The Explosion Band. The ending theme for the Japanese version of the series "I Won't Love You if You Don't Say It Right" (ちゃんと言わなきゃ愛さない, Chanto Iwanakya Aisanai) is performed by Enka singer Sayuri Ishikawa and features lyrics written by Tsunku. It was released as a single with additional tracks in Japan on October 1, 2015. The series has been licensed by Anime Limited for the UK market and by Discotek Media for the North American market. The dub, which was directed by Richard Epcar and Ellyn Stern, started airing in the United States on Adult Swim's Toonami programming block started on June 18, 2017 and concluded on January 21, 2018.

== Episode list ==
Int. No.	Jap. No.	Italian title / English title Original Japanese title	Directed by	Written by	Italian air date	Japanese air date	English air date
1	1	"Il matrimonio di Lupin III" / The Wedding of Lupin the Third; Transliteration: "Rupan sansei no kekkon" (Japanese: ルパン三世の結婚)	Yūichirō Yano; Kazuhide Tomonaga; Nobuo Tomizawa; Keiko Oyamada	Yūya Takahashi	August 30, 2015	October 1, 2015	June 18, 2017
After receiving a mysterious invitation, Inspector Zenigata arrives in San Marino for Lupin's wedding to Rebecca Rossellini, a wealthy heiress and businesswoman. It's soon revealed that the marriage is a sham, and that Lupin plans to steal the Royal Crown of Liberty, a rare artifact given to women to wear on the day after their wedding. Zenigata unravels the plan after someone claiming to be Lupin sends him a message, and begins chasing the criminals. As this is happening, Fujiko attempts to steal the Crown by tying up and gagging a local administrator and stealing his identity. She is captured in the ensuing chase, and Lupin is forced to surrender the Crown in exchange for her release. Someone disguised as the local police captain then leaves with the Crown, but is cornered by Lupin. After removing their disguise, it is revealed that the mastermind behind the entire plot was Rebecca, and that she deliberately manipulated Lupin to serve as a distraction while she stole the Crown herself. She manages to escape with the artifact, further revealing her devil-may-care attitude and desire to commit dangerous crimes for the thrill of it, while Lupin remarks that he should have made her sign divorce papers before she left.
2	2	"Il falso fantasista" / The Fake Fantasista; Transliteration: "Itsuwari no fantajisuta" (Japanese: 偽りのファンタジスタ)	Takuma Hirabayashi	Tomohiro Suzuki	August 30, 2015	October 8, 2015	June 25, 2017
Mauro Brozzi, a popular football player, is blackmailed by a rich criminal, Riccardo Mondini, into not playing in the final game of the Coppa Italia, or else he will expose Brozzi's medical records, revealing that he has been doping. Fujiko approaches Lupin with Brozzi to propose the job of stealing the records from Mondini's well patrolled mansion. He is initially uninterested, but upon seeing Brozzi in a drunken state changes his mind and agrees. Lupin and Jigen proceed to break into the mansion in disguise, reclaim the records, and defeat Mondini's bodyguards, while a mysterious agent recovers information from the mansion. Lupin meets up with Brozzi, revealing that he deduced that he is suffering from one of his eyes going blind, and that he has been taking the drugs to temporarily circumvent the effects, so that he can play in the finals before retiring, as thanks for the coach who took him in. During the match, it is revealed Lupin's payment for accepting was for Brozzi to score a hat-trick, which he successfully does.
3	3	"0.2% possibilità di sopravvivere" / 0.2% Chance of Survival; Transliteration: "Seizonritsu 0.2%" (Japanese: 生存率0.2%)	Yasumi Mikamoto; Kazuhide Tomonaga	Yūya Takahashi	August 30, 2015	October 15, 2015	July 9, 2017
Lupin announces that he plans to steal a precious diamond from the Prince of England, who is currently in Italy to pay a visit to Rebecca. However, both Jigen and Fujiko are captured and interrogated by agents of MI6, with Lupin being pursued by Nyx, a well-trained member in charge of the Prince's protection. Lupin attempts to escape with the diamond, but is relentlessly cornered by Nyx at nearly every turn. He eventually deduces that Nyx possesses a special ability similar to echo location that allows him to track his targets using the sound around him, and uses that to temporarily give him the slip. Lupin goes to rescue Jigen, but is once again held at gun point by Nyx, about to execute his orders to kill them. However, at a decisive moment, Nyx suddenly receives orders to protect the Prince when he's seemingly in danger, and decides to obey his duty, allowing Lupin and Jigen to escape. After giving Fujiko the diamond, Lupin reveals that he had manipulated Rebecca into spending time with the Prince on the hotel rooftop, where he had planted fireworks to go off at a specific time, aware that MI6 would prioritize the Prince's safety over everything else. He further admits him surviving the whole ordeal is thanks to lucky timing with Nyx granting him one last smoke, which Lupin and Fujiko cheers to.
4	4	"Tiratore scelto" / With a Gun in My Hand; Transliteration: "Waga te ni kenjū o" (Japanese: 我が手に拳銃を)	Hisaya Takabayashi	Tomohiro Suzuki	August 30, 2015	October 22, 2015	July 16, 2017
Due to having a bad toothache, Jigen heads to the closest town with a clinic in order to obtain some pain medicine for it. The head nurse, Livia, treats him, but also confiscates his gun in the process. Jigen soon learns that the town is run by a dangerous mob boss, Eric Urgiani, whose gang punishes anyone holding a firearm by wounding them as severely as possible without killing them, leading to the victims being referred to as "the Living Dead". Eric and his gang trash the hospital upon learning of Jigen's gun, but leave when it isn't discovered. An old man named Nino steals it and goes to confront Eric, but the gun is taken and he is also left severely wounded. Livia voices her frustration at the gang's ruthlessness and her inability to save anyone, but is offered support from Jigen, who leaves to confront the gang, while she operates on Nino. When the gang prepares to shoot Jigen, he manages to dodge all their gunfire, causing them to kill themselves. Jigen reclaims his gun from Eric, and when he tries to retaliate, Jigen kills him. Zenigata later deduces this exact series of events, however doesn't mention Jigen's name to the other officers. Shortly afterwards, Jigen leaves town with Lupin, while Livia thinks about him with a warm smile.
5	5	"La mano sinistra del mago" / The Magician's Left Hand; Transliteration: "Mahōtsukai no hidarite" (Japanese: 魔法使いの左手)	Yoshitaka Nagaoka	Erika Yoshida	September 6, 2015	October 29, 2015	July 23, 2017
Fujiko joins a circus troupe and approaches a young performer named Luca. He is ostracized from the rest of the troupe due to the previous ringleader, Tony Belcastro, having told only him all the secrets of his magic acts; they further blame him for the death of Belcastro in a trick accident, and how he refuses to tell anyone the secrets, not even Belcastro's son, the current Ringleader. Fujiko ends up warming up to Luca, inspiring him to pursue his dream of becoming a magician. The Ringleader keeps Fujiko hostage in order to force Luca to reveal some of the magic tricks, and proceeds to bludgeon him. In the hospital, Lupin and Jigen, disguised as reporters, question Luca about these events and his relation to Fujiko, believing that she was just manipulating him the entire time in order to also learn the secrets. During a performance, Fujiko is seemingly burned alive by a magic trick gone wrong, but escapes it. Luca confronts the Ringleader, leading him to confess that he had sabotaged Belcastro's trick which led to his death, jealous that he was going to entrust the circus to Luca and not his own son. Fujiko stops Luca before he can stab the Ringleader, and convinces him to run away with her so that he can embrace his true potential as a magician. Luca signs up with a new organization, while Fujiko is paid a hefty sum by them, revealing the real reason why she was pursuing Luca. Lupin confronts her, asking if she "took" or "saved" Luca, as she just smirks and drives off.
6	OVA–1	"Zombie a Venezia" / Venice of the Dead; Transliteration: "Venisu obu za deddo" (Japanese: ヴェニス・オブ・ザ・デッド)	Hiromichi Matano	Yūya Takahashi	September 6, 2015	DVD/Blu-ray exclusive	July 30, 2017
Rebecca invites Lupin to one of her mansions, an island near Venice, in order to finally sign the papers for their divorce. Suddenly, a horde of zombies attack the island, learning on the television of a virus that supposedly effected the rest of Italy, and the two barely manage to escape. After climbing a tree, Lupin prepares to protect Rebecca and jump into the ocean, when they are saved by helicopters. However, Lupin discovers that the entire thing was a candid-camera for an upcoming film known as "Venice of the Dead" that Rebecca is producing and starring in, directed by the Lippini Brothers. Annoyed by Rebecca's scheme, not wanting his face publicly revealed, and further egged on by Jigen and Goemon's remarks, Lupin goes to steal the film. Instead, Rebecca steals it first (leaving behind one of Lupin's calling cards) and Lupin pursues her on a gondola. They are attacked by a helicopter, but Lupin figures out this is also all part of the film shoot. Rebecca convinces Lupin to let them release the movie by revealing they will use digital effects to turn Lupin into a zombie, saving his privacy, which he reluctantly accepts. Rebecca reaffirms her love for Lupin, while he states his desire to not be tied down to one woman. Later, Lupin, Jigen, and Goemon watch the finished film in a theatre.
7	6	"Fino al tramonto della luna piena" / Until the Full Moon Wanes; Transliteration: "Mangetsu ga sugiru made" (Japanese: 満月が過ぎるまで)	Keiko Oyamada	Tatsurō Inamoto	September 6, 2015	November 5, 2015	August 6, 2017
Elena Gotti, the famous wife of a recently deceased billionaire, Roberto Gotti, is rumoured to be the only one to know where Roberto hid his fortune, causing her to be continuously threatened by many robbers. When Lupin announces his intention to pursue her, Zenigata arrives and puts her into custody to protect her. Elena takes him to her mountain cottage, where she reveals that she was a poor girl forced into prostitution by her own father, until she met Roberto, who saved her. It's revealed this Elena is actually Fujiko in disguise, who escapes in a helicopter with Lupin after he, disguised as Zenigata, interrogated the real Elena. However, Zenigata had already deduced this, blowing Lupin's cover before he could learn any information, and stowing away with them back to Elena. Zenigata protects Elena from an officer also after the treasure, and reveals that he also figured out that she had been branded by Roberto on her arm. She confesses that when Roberto found out that she had a lover, he spread the false news about her knowing about his caveau's hideout before he died, in order to make her life a living hell. To protect her from anymore harassment, Zenigata feigns to the press that Lupin stole all the treasure, which Lupin surprisingly corroborates. However, Elena is actually aware of the caveau's hideout, unintentionally leading Lupin, Jigen, and Fujiko to it. Zenigata, who also figured out both sides' schemes, appears and defends Elena, forcing the thieves to reluctantly retreat. Inspired by Zenigata saving her even despite lying to him, she decides to use the fortune for the good of Italy, becoming a politician to help the poverty stricken areas and fighting against the mafias controlling them.
8	7	"Il rapimento" / The Zapping Operation; Transliteration: "Zappingu operēshon" (Japanese: ザッピング・オペレーション)	Hiroshi Ikehata	Yūya Takahashi	September 13, 2015	November 12, 2015	August 13, 2017
Brigitte, Nyx's daughter (who, like her sisters and her mother, is unaware of her father's true job), meets Rebecca while on a school trip, who she is infatuated over. She finds Rebecca's purse left behind, but before she can return it, she is kidnapped by women smugglers who intend to take her to the "Dream of Italy". Nyx, who is undercover investigating the prostitute ring, blows his cover when he discovers Brigitte among the options and goes rogue to rescue her. Meanwhile, Lupin and Jigen have just executed an easy jewel heist, but when their ride is cornered by Zenigata, they steal another car to getaway, which unknowingly has Brigitte in the trunk. At the same time, Rebecca and her butler Robson also go to track down the car to retrieve her purse. Lupin and Jigen discover Brigitte and untie her, only to be attacked by a masked Nyx, who they all believe to be the kidnapper, forcing them to flee, passing by Rebecca in the process. Lupin and Jigen hide Brigitte in a warehouse and battle Nyx, whom Lupin is able to identity due to his set of skills. Before they can explain the misunderstanding, Rebecca appears, revealing she had Robson take Brigitte away (to go shopping). Nyx nearly shoots Rebecca in a fit of rage, but Lupin stops and calms him down; at the same time, MI6's Roman division observing the rogue Nyx stand down. The misunderstandings are cleared up and Nyx returns home, gifting Brigitte a signature from Rebecca. While Jigen is annoyed at their loot being recovered by Zenigata, Lupin (and Rebecca) are curious about the "Dream of Italy" that was mentioned, while MI6 continues to observe all the relevant players.
9	8	"Benvenuti all'albergo infestato" / Welcome to the Haunted Hotel; Transliteration: "Hōnteddo hoteru e yōkoso" (Japanese: ホーンテッドホテルへようこそ)	Masaki Utsunomiya	Tomohiro Suzuki	September 13, 2015	November 19, 2015	August 20, 2017
Lupin and Jigen go looking for a treasure in an old castle, converted into an hotel, which is said to be haunted by a ghost of a deceased woman. Jigen is initially dismissive, but upon being spooked by a bloody girl, drowns himself in a drunken stupor. Meanwhile, the Mama Family, who Lupin had stolen a letter from containing information on the treasure, follow him into the castle. Lupin discovers a secret passageway where he meets a little girl named Carla, who claims to be protecting the treasure for her sister, Alena. Jigen confronts the hotel manager and the fake ghost girl from earlier, learning that they have been pretending the place is haunted in order to bring more attention to it, however are unaware of any treasure. With Carla's help, Lupin manages to make it out alive through most of the death traps, even when the Mama Family appear to try and get the treasure themselves, but they are knocked out of the castle through a rushing water trap. Lupin and Carla make it to the treasure room at the top of the castle, where Lupin discovers that Carla is actually the ghost, having been left behind by her sister to protect the treasure, before she too tragically died. Carla finally rests in peace, and Lupin buries her remains in a grave next to her sister.
10	9	"Requiem per gli assassini" / Requiem for the Assassins; Transliteration: "Koroshiya-tachi no rekuiemu" (Japanese: 殺し屋たちの鎮魂歌（レクイエム）)	Yoshitaka Nagaoka	Tatsurō Inamoto	September 13, 2015	November 26, 2015	August 27, 2017
In the past, Goemon was hired alongside several other assassins by the young Italian politician Leopoldo Flago, in order to kill Samuel Decale, an African dictator, and his bodyguard, Zora, a legendary sniper. During the mission, Goemon meets Belladonna, a young rookie assassin, and when he notices her planting a bomb on herself as a last resort, he "pinky swears" to protect her no matter what. When the assassins find their targets, Belladonna is successfully able to shoot Zora, while Goemon kills Decale. Sometime later, the surviving assassins are suddenly each being killed, with Goemon believing Zora to still be alive, seeking revenge, so tracks down Belladonna. They manage to locate Zora's supposed hiding spot, only for Goemon to realize it was a trap set by Belladonna, the real killer. She reveals that she was rescued and raised by Flago to be an assassin, and has ordered her to tie up loose ends so his connection to Decale's assassination won't be discovered. Belladonna is unable to go through with killing Goemon so just leaves him behind. Flago prepares to assault Belladonna when she rejects his advances, only for Goemon to arrive and kill everyone. Flago warns Goemon that Belladonna has a bomb in her heart, but Belladonna kills him, and activates the bomb herself, believing it to be her punishment for her sins. Despite that, Goemon saves her by skillfully cutting the bomb out of her heart. Later, while he, Lupin, and Jigen are being chased by Zenigata, they speak to a young boy who talks about "pinky swears" he learned from a woman, making Goemon realize Belladonna is alive and safe, internally saying his goodbyes to her.
11	10	"Nettare d'amore" / The Lovesick Pig; Transliteration: "Koi wazurai no buta" (Japanese: 恋煩いのブタ)	Yōsuke Senbo	Erika Yoshida	September 20, 2015	December 3, 2015	September 10, 2017
Lupin is invited by both Fujiko and Rebecca to a party where the collection of a recently deceased famous wine collector, Count McCalman, will be put on sale, and decides to accept both the invites trying to jump from a girl to the other during the party. In order to win Lupin's affection, the two girls challenge each other to find the legendary Nettare d'Amore (Love's Nectar), a very rare and precious wine. However, it's a really dangerous wine, connected to a dark secret.
12	11	"Il sogno italiano (prima parte)" / The Dream of Italy, Part 1 Transliteration: "Itaria no yume zenpen" (Japanese: イタリアの夢 前篇)	Takuma Hirabayashi	Yūya Takahashi	September 20, 2015	December 10, 2015	September 17, 2017
Rebecca is kidnapped by the MI6, and Robson calls for Lupin's help. Lupin finds out that the MI6 is looking for the researches of Rebecca's lost love, Kou, a young japanese scientist who died some time ago. Since the MI6's italian headquarter (located in the basement of the ancient Teatro di Marcello in Rome) is impregnable, Lupin manages to trick Nyx in order to make him escort Rebecca outside the building, but when Robson, to protect her mistress, threatens to hurt Nyx's family, the agent goes berserk, attacking his own companions when they try to stop him; then, despite being branded by the MI6 as a traitor, he starts searching for Lupin in order to exact his revenge.
13	12	"Il sogno italiano (seconda parte)" / The Dream of Italy, Part 2 Transliteration: "Itaria no yume kōhen" (Japanese: イタリアの夢 後篇)	Osamu Kobayashi	Yūya Takahashi	September 20, 2015	December 17, 2015	September 24, 2017
After his escape from Rome, Lupin manages to decrypt Kou's notes, suddenly finding himself in a sort of dream, where he meets Kou himself. He informs Lupin that this world, called Il Sogno Italiano (the Italian Dream) has the power to influence all mankind, and that someone killed him in order to find out his secrets. Therefore, when Lupin awakes, he and Rebecca go to San Marino to destroy his research notes, however they're found by Nyx, who uses his abilities to memorize Kou's notes before their destruction, then he tries to kill Lupin, but they're both captured by the MI6. Later, Zenigata manages to obtain Lupin's custody from the MI6, while Nyx manages to exchange Kou's research with his life and his family's safety.
14	13	"La fine di Lupin III" / The End of Lupin the Third; Transliteration: "Rupan sansei no saigo" (Japanese: ルパン三世の最期)	Keiko Oyamada	Yūya Takahashi	September 28, 2015	December 24, 2015	October 1, 2017
Zenigata is able to stop several attempts by Lupin to escape from many Italian prisons, but the Italian government can't afford all the costs for such surveillance. So, to prevent him from escaping once and for all, Zenigata escorts Lupin to a single, impenetrable cell on a tiny island, under his personal surveillance. But not even this will prove enough to stop the King of Thieves. Meanwhile, a mysterious prisoner manages to escape from the MI6's headquarters in Rome.
15	14	"Non spostate la Gioconda!" / Don't Move the Mona Lisa; Transliteration: "Mona Riza o ugokasu na" (Japanese: モナリザを動かすな)	Tomoya Takahashi	Tomohiro Suzuki	October 5, 2015	January 8, 2016	October 8, 2017
Lupin is out of money due to his long detention, so he decides to steal the Mona Lisa in Paris in order to sell it to a nationalist Italian millionaire. He manages to complete the theft, but he soon finds out he has stolen a fake, since the original Mona Lisa is in the hands of a corrupt French politician, Philippe, which is secretly using it to fund his political career. At the end, the real Mona Lisa returns to the Louvre, but Lupin manages to sell an incredible well-done replica casually found by Fujiko to the millionaire. Meanwhile, the man who created the perfect fake, looking at an Italian 1€ coin, believes he recognizes one of his sketches on it.
16	15	"Sotto copertura al liceo" / High School Undercover! Transliteration: "Haisukūru sennyū daisakusen!" (Japanese: ハイスクール潜入大作戦！)	Keiko Oyamada	Yūya Takahashi; Ryōsuke Fujisawa	October 12, 2015	January 15, 2016	October 15, 2017
Lupin steals a precious diamond with the unique power to change the personality of anyone who looks at it, but during his escape the jewel ends up in a boy's backpack. To get it back, Lupin sneaks into the boy's high school as a new professor, and then finds out that the diamond has been found by a group of teachers that are planning to use it to build a bomb and free themselves from a blackmailer.
17	16	"Il giorno libero di Lupin" / Lupin's Day Off; Transliteration: "Rupan no kyūjitsu" (Japanese: ルパンの休日)	Yoshitaka Nagaoka	Erika Yoshida	October 19, 2015	January 21, 2016	October 22, 2017
Lupin, Jigen and Goemon want to spend some time in the hills outside Rome, but they casually find a lost dog. The dog belongs to a rich woman who's ready to offer a big reward to anyone who will be able to bring it back to her. So, the trio starts a long journey to Messina, where they'll be able to fulfill their duty.
18	17	"La marionetta assassina" / The Murdering Marionette; Transliteration: "Minagoroshi no marionetto" (Japanese: 皆殺しのマリオネット)	Hiromichi Matano	Tatsurō Inamoto	October 25, 2015	January 28, 2016	November 5, 2017
Lupin and his team are kidnapped by Greco, some sort of philanthropist who has sworn to rid the world of all criminals. Trapped in a giant underground basement, they're challenged to find a way to get out, but they are informed by Greco that one of them has been secretly brainwashed in order to become his personal puppet. Unable to find out who the puppet is that is trying to kill them all, Lupin and the others end up suspecting each other.
19	18	"La prima cena" / The First Supper; Transliteration: "Hajimari no bansan" (Japanese: 始まりの晩餐)	Nobuo Tomizawa; Yoshitaka Nagaoka	Yūya Takahashi	November 2, 2015	February 4, 2016	November 12, 2017
Strange paintings representing Lupin, his team and many other persons involved in the Sogno Italiano affair begin to appear all around Italy. In search for answers, Lupin and all the others represented people (Jigen, Goemon, Fujiko, Rebecca, Robson, Zenigata, Nyx and Gibbons, the high chief of the MI6's Italian division) meet in Santa Maria delle Grazie, where someone has prepared for them some sort of revisiting of Leonardo da Vinci's L'Ultima Cena. The mind beyond all this will prove to be Leonardo himself, cloned and resurrected by the MI6 thanks to Kou's research about the Sogno Italiano, which proves to be some sort of collective consciousness inside the mind of every man on Earth where all mankind's knowledge is housed. Leonardo claims to be surprised of how much Italy has changed since his time, and before his escape, he says that soon the country will know a new era.
20	19	"Non svegliare il drago che dorme" / Dragons Sleep Soundly; Transliteration: "Ryū wa shizuka ni nemuru" (Japanese: 龍は静かに眠る)	Takuma Hirabayashi	Tomohiro Suzuki	November 9, 2015	February 11, 2016	November 19, 2017
Fox, a dangerous mercenary, manages to steal the "Dragon's Tail", a top secret list of all the MI6's secret agents around the world, taking it to his island. To take it back, Gibbons orders Nyx to retake his place in the secret service, or otherwise his family will be killed. However, Lupin too is looking for the Dragon's Tail, and during their fight the MI6, believing that Nyx has failed, decides to sterilize the whole island. Somehow Nyx and Lupin manage to escape alive from the island, and while Nyx secretly saves his family from MI6's killers, Lupin and Leonardo face Gibbon, with Lupin discovering that the Dragon Tail's theft had been commissioned by Leonardo in order to protect himself from the organization. Gibbons takes a shot at Leonardo, but is killed when his gun (sabotaged by Leonardo) backfires, and Leonardo decides to leave the Dragon's Tail to Lupin.
21	20	"Per sentirti cantare ancora" / To Hear You Sing Again; Transliteration: "Mou ichido, kimi no utagoe" (Japanese: もう一度、君の歌声)	Kenichi Maejima	Erika Yoshida	November 15, 2015	February 18, 2016	December 3, 2017
Lupin steals an old Fiat 500 "Topolino" from a vintage cars' dealer, and Zenigata cannot arrest him because the car is extremely precious and could be damaged. The Fiat in fact belongs to an aged Italian singer, Nora Anita, who is now on the brink of death, and her husband has decided to sell anything that could make him remember her love when she'll be dead to avoid further suffering. However, the car seems to have some sort of independent will, forcing Lupin to travel to a peaceful place on the banks of a lake, a place used by Nora and her husband as their private love refuge in their youth. Nora, in her heart, wanted to feel for the last time all that peaceful and beautiful sensations, and this feeling had been "absorbed" by the car, giving her a proper consciousness.
22	21	"Dal Giappone con amore" / From Japan with Love; Transliteration: "Nippon yori ai o komete" (Japanese: 日本より愛をこめて)	Keiko Oyamada	Tatsurō Inamoto	November 15, 2015	February 25, 2016	December 10, 2017
Shortly after having returned to Japan, Fujiko is kidnapped, and her abductor orders Lupin to come back to Japan as well, in order to steal a precious doll for him. At the end, they both discover that the kidnapping was a trap prepared for them by the Japanese detective Akechi Holmes, and Lupin is arrested. Fujiko instead manages to escape, and to restore her pride, she decides to help Lupin escape, taking advantage of the lack of coordination between Akechi and Zenigata.
23	OVA–2	"Rendez-vous senza fermate" / Nonstop Rendezvous; Transliteration: "Nonsutoppu randebū" (Japanese: ノンストップランデブー)	Nobuo Tomizawa	Yūya Takahashi	November 22, 2015	DVD/Blu-ray exclusive	December 17, 2017
While watching her last movie, inspired by a true story, Rebecca remembers the day when she and Lupin first met. Rebecca and Robson had been kidnapped by a stalker, and Lupin, who had recently arrived in Italy to meet Rebecca to prepare for the theft of the crown, was able to save them thanks to Zenigata's help.
24	22	"Ti prenderò, Lupin" / I'm Going to Get You, Lupin; Transliteration: "Lupin, itadaki ni mairimasu" (Japanese: ルパン、頂きに参ります)	Hiromichi Matano	Erika Yoshida	November 23, 2015	March 3, 2016	January 7, 2018
Rebecca realizes she is truly in love with Lupin and announces to Italy that she'll be able to capture him. In the meantime, Lupin continues to break into various banks without stealing anything, and Rebecca understands that he's searching for something in particular. It's the beginning of a great battle between the two, with the final stand that will take place inside the last bank. At the end, Rebecca finds out that Lupin was in search of a single banknote in order to win a bet with Jigen, and they somehow manage to safely escape the police, even with Robson's help, proving to themselves to be quite a fine couple together. Despite this, at the end, Lupin decides to escape, and Robson, despite his concerns, decides to let Rebecca live as she pleases.
25	23	"L'armonia del mondo (prima parte)" / World Dissection, Part 1 Transliteration: "Sekai kaibō zenpen" (Japanese: 世界解剖 前篇)	Yoshitaka Nagaoka	Yūya Takahashi	November 29, 2015	March 10, 2016	January 14, 2018
Leonardo is ready to create his greatest masterpiece, the Armonia del Mondo (World's Harmony) and uses a futuristic device to entrap all the Italians inside the Sogno Italiano, replicating at the same time his consciousness in the mind of every inhabitant of Italy. Inside this dream, he defies every Italian to beat him in the thing he's most versed, and if the challenger prevails, he'll be able to wake up, or otherwise his/her consciousness will be "reprogrammed" based on Leonardo's own, with the final objective to create a nation of geniuses with the necessary knowledge to create a new world. Lupin, Jigen, Goemon, Fujiko, Nyx and Zenigata manage to defeat Leonardo, but when he arrives in San Marino, Lupin discovers that all the other Italians, starting from Rebecca, have instead failed, and soon they'll reawaken with new personalities. Lupin then uses Leonardo's device to replicate even his own consciousness inside Rebecca's mind, where Lupin and Leonardo fight for control.
26	24	"L'armonia del mondo (seconda parte)" / World Dissection, Part 2 Transliteration: "Sekai kaibō kōhen" (Japanese: 世界解剖 後編)	Keiko Oyamada	Yūya Takahashi	November 30, 2015	March 17, 2016	January 21, 2018
Inside Rebecca's mind, Lupin manages to defeat Leonardo, allowing Rebecca to maintain her original personality. However, Leonardo believes to have won nonetheless, since all the Italians should be again under his influence, but he soon finds out that Lupin has copied his consciousness not only in Rebecca's mind, but also in all the Italians' minds, and so he managed to defeat Leonardo concretely. Then, Leonardo starts to feel sick, since his artificial body is now close to death. Before his demise, Lupin comforts him, telling him that his mind will live forever in all the Italians, and in his mind as well, thanks to the Sogno Italiano, while his unprecedented contribution to all of mankind will be remembered forever. Some time later, with all the world accusing him for what happened in Italy, Lupin is forced to leave the country, but before taking off he has a final meeting with Rebecca. Rebecca promises to wait for him until he returns, and he allows her to keep the "Lupin" surname. The last image shows Lupin and his gang escaping from Zenigata, disappearing among the crowd in the Stazione Centrale in Milan.

== Home media release ==
=== Japanese ===
VAP (Japan, Region 2/A)
Vol.	Episodes	Release date	Ref.
1	1–3	December 23, 2015	
2	4–6	January 20, 2016	
3	7–9	February 24, 2016	
4	10–12 + OVA 1	March 23, 2016	
5	13–15	April 20, 2016	
6	16–18	April 20, 2016	
7	19–21	June 22, 2016	
8	22–24 + OVA 2	July 20, 2016	

=== English ===
Discotek Media (North America, Region 1/A)
Name	Discs	Episodes	Release date	Note	Ref.
Part IV	3	1–26	May 29, 2018	English track only	
Part IV	2	1–26	April 30, 2019	Japanese track only	

== See also ==
- Lupin III
- List of Lupin III Part I episodes
- List of Lupin III Part II episodes
- List of Lupin III Part III episodes
- List of Lupin III: The Woman Called Fujiko Mine episodes
- List of Lupin III Part 5 episodes
- List of Lupin III Part 6 episodes
- List of Lupin III television specials
