= List of Lupin the 3rd Part II episodes =

Lupin The Third DVD box set for Part II

Produced by Japanese animation studio Tokyo Movie Shinsha, Lupin the 3rd Part II is the second Lupin III television series. The series contains 155 episodes which aired between October 3, 1977, and October 6, 1980, on the Japanese television network Nippon Television. Episodes 145 and 155 were the first to appear in the United States on VHS, released by Streamline Pictures separately in 1994 as Tales of the Wolf and together in 1995 as Lupin III's Greatest Capers. Two feature films, The Mystery of Mamo and The Castle of Cagliostro, were released in theaters during the original broadcast run of the series. 26 episodes of Geneon Entertainment's English adaptation of the anime (the first 27 episodes, excluding the third) aired on Adult Swim starting on January 13, 2003. 15 Region 1 DVD volumes (a total of 79 episodes) have been released in the United States by Geneon Entertainment. Richard Epcar, the voice of Jigen, revealed via Twitter that Geneon lost the license to the series before they could dub the rest of the episodes in English. In December 2015, Discotek Media announced it had licensed the show and would be releasing the Second Series in four DVD sets, with the first one coming in 2016.

The series, based on the Lupin III manga written by Monkey Punch beginning in 1967, centers on the adventures of Arsène Lupin III, the grandson of Arsène Lupin, the gentleman thief of Maurice Leblanc's series of novels. He is joined by Daisuke Jigen, crack-shot and Lupin's closest ally; Fujiko Mine, the femme fatale and Lupin's love interest who works against Lupin more often than with him; and Goemon Ishikawa XIII, a master swordsman and the descendant of Ishikawa Goemon, the legendary Japanese bandit. Lupin is often chased by Inspector Koichi Zenigata, the rather cynical detective who has made it his life mission to catch Lupin.

== Series overview ==
The "seasons" that compromise the episode list correspond to the series' international release outside of Japan. In Japan, Lupin the 3rd aired continuously year-round with regular preemptions for sporting events and television specials taking place, not split into standard seasonal cycles.

Season	Episodes	Originally released	
Season	Episodes	First released	Last released
1	26	October 3, 1977	April 3, 1978
2	25	April 10, 1978	September 25, 1978
3	52	October 2, 1978	October 1, 1979
4	52	October 8, 1979	October 6, 1980

== Episode list ==
=== Season 1 (1977–78) ===
No. overall	No. in season	Japanese translated title / English title (Note: "English titles" are those found on the Region 1 DVD release by Pioneer/Geneon Entertainment. Episodes 1–26 were broadcast on Adult Swim, with the exception of episode 3 which did not air due to its Nazi related themes.)	Directed by	Written by	Original release date	English air date
1	1	"Lupin the Third's Gallant Appearance" / "The Return of Lupin the 3rd" Transliteration: "Lupin Sansei Sassou Toujou" (Japanese: ルパン三世颯爽登場)	Kyosuke Mikuriya	Tadaaki Yamazaki	October 3, 1977	January 14, 2003 (Note: The Geneon English dub of Lupin the Third Part II episodes 1–2, 4–27 first aired in the United States on Adult Swim.)
2	2	"Wads of Bills Blossom in the Rio Sunset" / "Buns, Guns, and Fun in the Sun"; Transliteration: "Rio no Yuuhi ni Saku Satsutaba" (Japanese: リオの夕陽に咲く札束)	Kyosuke Mikuriya	Yoshio Takeuchi (Note: Credited as Mamoru Konno)	October 10, 1977	January 15, 2003
3	3	"Hitler's Legacy" / "To Be or Nazi Be"; Transliteration: "Hitler no Isan" (Japanese: ヒトラーの遺産)	Kazunori Tanahashi	Yutaka Kaneko	October 17, 1977	May 9, 2007 (Note: The Geneon English dub of Lupin the Third Part II episodes 3, 28–52 aired in Canada on G4techTV. These episodes went unaired in the United States.)
4	4	"I Can Hear Nessie's Singing" / "50 Ways to Leave Your 50-Foot Lover"; Transliteration: "Nessie no Uta ga Kikoeru" (Japanese: ネッシーの唄が聞こえる)	Kazunori Tanahashi	Atsushi Yamatoya	October 24, 1977	January 16, 2003
5	5	"I'll Teach You How to Transport Gold Bars" / "Gold Smuggling 101"; Transliteration: "Kinka no Hakobikata Oshiemasu" (Japanese: 塊の運び方教えます)	Kazunori Tanahashi	Noboru Shiroyama	October 31, 1977	January 17, 2003
6	6	"Will the Leaning Tower of Pisa Be Standing?" / "Shaky Pisa"; Transliteration: "Pisa no Shatoo wa Tatteiru ka" (Japanese: ピサの斜塔は立っているか)	Kazunori Tanahashi	Yutaka Kaneko	November 7, 1977	January 21, 2003
7	7	"Tutankhamen's 3000-Year-Old Curse" / "Cursed Case Scenario"; Transliteration: "Tutankhamen Sanzen no Noroi" (Japanese: ツタンカーメン三千年の呪い)	Kyosuke Mikuriya	Yutaka Kaneko	November 14, 1977	January 22, 2003
8	8	"Venetian Super Express" / "Disorient Express"; Transliteration: "Venicia Chootokkyuu" (Japanese: ベネチア超特急)	Kyosuke Mikuriya	Yoshio Takeuchi	November 21, 1977	January 23, 2003
9	9	"Would You Like Ukiyo-e Blues?" / "Now Museum, Now You Don't"; Transliteration: "Ukiyo-E Blues wa Ikaga" (Japanese: 浮世絵ブルースはいかが)	Kyosuke Mikuriya	Hideo Takayashiki (Note: Credited as Ran Mouri)	November 28, 1977	January 24, 2003
10	10	"Steal the File M123" / "ZenigataCon"; Transliteration: "File M123 o Nusume" (Japanese: ファイルM123を盗め)	Kazunori Tanahashi	Noboru Shiroyama	December 5, 1977	January 28, 2003
11	11	"Bet on the Monaco Grand Prix" / "Who's Vroomin' Who?"; Transliteration: "Monaco GP ni Kakero" (Japanese: モナコGPに賭けろ)	Kyosuke Mikuriya	Yoshio Takeuchi	December 12, 1977	January 29, 2003
12	12	"A Gift for the President" / "The Sleight Before Christmas"; Transliteration: "Daitooryoo e no Okurimono" (Japanese: 大統領への贈り物)	Kazunori Tanahashi	Noboru Shiroyama	December 19, 1977	January 30, 2003
13	13	"The Great Chase in San Francisco" / "I Left My Mind in San Francisco"; Transliteration: "San Francisco Daitsuiseki" (Japanese: サンフランシスコ大追跡)	Kyosuke Mikuriya	Yutaka Kaneko	December 26, 1977	January 31, 2003
14	14	"Big Adventure of the Caribbean Sea" / "Curse of the Jumbo Juju"; Transliteration: "Carib no Daibooken" (Japanese: カリブ海の大冒険)	Kyosuke Mikuriya	Tadaaki Yamazaki	January 9, 1978	February 4, 2003
15	15	"Renowned Detectives in the Sky" / "The Case of the Risible Dirigible"; Transliteration: "Meitantei Sora o Yuku" (Japanese: 名探偵空をゆく)	Kyosuke Mikuriya	Yutaka Kaneko	January 16, 1978	February 5, 2003
16	16	"Two-Faced Lupin" / "Crude Reproduction, Perfect Frame"; Transliteration: "Futatsu no Kao no Lupin" (Japanese: 二つの顔のルパン)	Kyosuke Mikuriya	Yuu Tagami	January 23, 1978	February 6, 2003
17	17	"Target the Oil Dollars" / "Sheik-Down"; Transliteration: "Oildollar o Nerae" (Japanese: オイルダラーを狙え)	Kyosuke Mikuriya	Yuu Tagami	January 30, 1978	February 7, 2003
18	18	"Black Panther" / "My Birthday Pursuit"; Transliteration: "Black Panther" (Japanese: ブラック·パンサー)	Kyosuke Mikuriya	Yutaka Kaneko	February 6, 1978	May 20, 2003
19	19	"Can the 10-Year Vault Be Broken?" / "A Safe Bet"; Transliteration: "Juunen Kinko wa Yabureru ka" (Japanese: 十年金庫は破れるか)	Kyosuke Mikuriya	Noboru Shiroyama	February 13, 1978	May 21, 2003
20	20	"Cornered Lupin" / "Hell Toupee"; Transliteration: "Oitsumerareta Lupin" (Japanese: 追いつめられたルパン)	Kyosuke Mikuriya	Shunichirō Koyama Shōichirō Ōkubo	February 20, 1978	May 22, 2003
21	21	"Goemon's Revenge" / "The Last Mastery"; Transliteration: "Goemon no Fukushuu" (Japanese: 五ェ門の復讐)	Kyosuke Mikuriya	Sarada Oil	February 27, 1978	May 23, 2003
22	22	"Explore the Mysterious Women's Palace" / "Lupin in Paradise"; Transliteration: "Nazo no Nyoonin Yakata o Sagure" (Japanese: 謎の女人館を探れ)	Kyosuke Mikuriya	Noboru Shiroyama	March 6, 1978	May 27, 2003
23	23	"A Witch in the Fourth Dimension" / "Auntie Ballistic"; Transliteration: "Daiyojigen no Majo" (Japanese: 第4次元の魔女)	Kyosuke Mikuriya	Atsushi Yamatoya	March 13, 1978	May 28, 2003
24	24	"The Phantom Thief Rat Boy Appears!" / "Rats to You"; Transliteration: "Kaitoo Nezumi-Koozoo Arawaru" (Japanese: 怪盗ねずみ小僧現わる)	Kyosuke Mikuriya	Kiyoshi Miyata	March 20, 1978	May 29, 2003
25	25	"Encounter With the Deadly Iron Lizard" / "The Lair of the Land-Shark"; Transliteration: "Hissatsu Tokage Kenzan" (Japanese: 必殺鉄トカゲ見参)	Kyosuke Mikuriya	Noboru Shiroyama	March 27, 1978	May 30, 2003
26	26	"A Rose and a Pistol" / "Shot Through the Heart"; Transliteration: "Bara to Pistol" (Japanese: バラとピストル)	Kyosuke Mikuriya	Atsushi Yamatoya	April 3, 1978	June 3, 2003

=== Season 2 (1978) ===
No. overall	No. in season	Japanese translated title / English title (Note: "English titles" are those found on the Region 1 DVD release by Pioneer/Geneon Entertainment. Episodes 27 was broadcast on Adult Swim as a replacement of episode 3 from Season 1, which did not air due to its Nazi related themes.)	Directed by	Written by	Original release date	English air date
27	1	"Where Did the Cinderella Stamp Go?" / "The Little Princess of Darkness"; Transliteration: "Cinderella no Kitte wa Doko e Itta" (Japanese: シンデレラの切手はどこへいった)	Kyosuke Mikuriya	Yutaka Kaneko	April 10, 1978	June 4, 2003
28	2	"Female Detective Melon" / "Revenge of La Nerd"; Transliteration: "Onna Deka Melon" (Japanese: 女刑事メロン)	Kyosuke Mikuriya	Yutaka Kaneko	April 17, 1978	June 13, 2007
29	3	"Electric Pigeon Tactics" / "Fry Me to the Moon"; Transliteration: "Dengeki Hatapoppo Sakusen" (Japanese: 電撃ハトポッポ作戦)	Kyosuke Mikuriya	Atsushi Yamatoya	April 24, 1978	June 14, 2007
30	4	"The Wind in Morocco is Hot" / "Morocco Horror Picture Show"; Transliteration: "Morocco no Kaze wa Atsuku" (Japanese: モロッコの風は熱く)	Kyosuke Mikuriya	Noboru Shiroyama	May 1, 1978	June 15, 2007
31	5	"Shoot Into the Midnight Sun" / "Twins Pique"; Transliteration: "Byakuya ni Mukatte Ute" (Japanese: 白夜に向かって撃て)	Kyosuke Mikuriya	Atsushi Yamatoya	May 8, 1978	June 18, 2007
32	6	"Lupin Dies Twice" / "Lupin the Interred"; Transliteration: "Lupin wa Nido Shinu" (Japanese: ルパンは二度死ぬ)	Kyosuke Mikuriya	Atsushi Yamatoya	May 15, 1978	June 19, 2007
33	7	"To Whom Orion's Crown Belongs" / "A Rumble Royale"; Transliteration: "Orion no Ookan wa Dare o Mono" (Japanese: オリオンの王冠は誰のもの)	Kyosuke Mikuriya	Mon Shichijō	May 22, 1978	June 20, 2007
34	8	"Lupin Who Turned Into a Vampire" / "But your Brother was Such a Nice Guy"; Transliteration: "Kyuuketsuki ni Natta Lupin" (Japanese: 吸血鬼になったルパン)	Kyosuke Mikuriya	Kiyoshi Miyata	May 29, 1978	June 21, 2007
35	9	"Pursue the Gorilla Gang" / "Gorilla Tactics"; Transliteration: "Gorilla Gang o Okkakero" (Japanese: ゴリラギャングを追っかけろ)	Kyosuke Mikuriya	Mon Shichijō	June 5, 1978	June 22, 2007
36	10	"Uncover the Secret of Tsukikage Castle" / "The Riddle of Tsukikage Castle"; Transliteration: "Tsukikagejoo no Himitsu o Abake" (Japanese: 月影城の秘密をあばけ)	Kyosuke Mikuriya	Mon Shichijō	June 12, 1978	June 25, 2007
37	11	"The Hidden Gold of Genghis Khan" / "Khan Job"; Transliteration: "Genghis Khan no Maizookin" (Japanese: ジンギスカンの埋蔵金)	Kyosuke Mikuriya	Kiyoshi Miyata	June 19, 1978	June 26, 2007
38	12	"The Sweet Trap of ICPO" / "Happy Betrayals to You"; Transliteration: "ICPO no Amai Wana" (Japanese: ICPOの甘い罠)	Kyosuke Mikuriya	Yutaka Kaneko	June 26, 1978	June 27, 2007
39	13	"Diamonds Disappeared Under the Hong Kong Sky" / "Pretty Cluckin' Insane"; Transliteration: "Hong Kong no Yozora ni Daia wa Kieta" (Japanese: 香港の夜空にダイヤは消えた)	Kyosuke Mikuriya	Yoshio Takeuchi	July 3, 1978	June 28, 2007
40	14	"Operation Missile-Jack" / "Payload"; Transliteration: "Misslejack Sakusen" (Japanese: ミサイルジャック作戦)	Yasumi Mikamoto	Hideo Takayashiki	July 10, 1978	June 29, 2007
41	15	"Search for the Treasure of Princess Kaguya" / "Heroes and Vixens"; Transliteration: "Kaguyahime no Takara o Sagase" (Japanese: かぐや姫の宝を探せ)	Yasumi Mikamoto	Kiyoshi Miyata	July 17, 1978	July 2, 2007
42	16	"Lupin Has Become a Bride" / "Crusin' in Drag"; Transliteration: "Hanayome ni Natta Lupin" (Japanese: 花嫁になったルパン)	Yasumi Mikamoto	Hiroyasu Yamaura	July 24, 1978	July 3, 2007
43	17	"Where are the Peking Man's Bones" / "Jumpin' the Bones"; Transliteration: "Peking Genjin no Hone wa Doko ni" (Japanese: 北京原人の骨はどこに)	Yasumi Mikamoto	Hideo Takayashiki	July 31, 1978	July 4, 2007
44	18	"The Vanished Special Armored Truck" / "Lion, Cheatin' and Stealin'"; Transliteration: "Kieta Tokubetsu Sookoosha" (Japanese: 消えた特別装甲車)	Kyosuke Mikuriya	Yoshio Takeuchi	August 7, 1978	July 5, 2007
45	19	"Murder Smells Like Wine" / "Diamonds and Minx"; Transliteration: "Koroshi wa Wine no Nioi" (Japanese: 殺しはワインの匂い)	Kyosuke Mikuriya	Sadayuki Okuyama	August 14, 1978	July 6, 2007
46	20	"Lupin is Available to the Highest Bidder" / "The Island of Dr. Derange"; Transliteration: "Lupin Otakaku Urimasu" (Japanese: ルパンお高く売ります)	Yasumi Mikamoto	Noboru Shiroyama	August 21, 1978	July 9, 2007
47	21	"Her Majesty's Bumbling Inspectors" / "Crownin' Around"; Transliteration: "Joooheika no Zukkoke Keibu" (Japanese: 女王陛下のズッコケ警部)	Kyosuke Mikuriya	Banmei Takahashi	August 28, 1978	July 10, 2007
48	22	"Lupin Laughs at the Alarm Bell" / "Vault Assault"; Transliteration: "Hijoo Bell ni Lupin wa Warau" (Japanese: 非常ベルにルパンは笑う)	Kyosuke Mikuriya	Yoshio Takeuchi	September 4, 1978	July 11, 2007
49	23	"A Pretty Woman Has Venom" / "Snake Charmer"; Transliteration: "Kawaii Onna ni wa Doku ga Aru" (Japanese: 可愛いい女には毒がある)	Yasumi Mikamoto	Misuke Tsurumo Yoshio Takeuchi	September 11, 1978	July 12, 2007
50	24	"The Lupin I Loved - Part One" / "The Second Time Around - Part One"; Transliteration: "Watashi ga Aishita Lupin "Zempen"" (Japanese: 私が愛したルパン"前編")	Kyosuke Mikuriya	Yutaka Kaneko	September 18, 1978	July 13, 2007
51	25	"The Lupin I Loved - Part Two" / "The Second Time Around - Part Two"; Transliteration: "Watashi ga Aishita Lupin "Koohen"" (Japanese: 私が愛したルパン"後編")	Kyosuke Mikuriya	Yutaka Kaneko	September 25, 1978	July 16, 2007

=== Season 3 (1978–79) ===
No. overall	No. in season	Japanese translated title / English title (Note: "English titles" are those found on the Region 1 DVD release by Pioneer/Geneon Entertainment for episodes 52–80 and found on Crunchyroll's streaming release for episodes 81–103.)	Original release date
52	1	"Emmanuelle Whispers Like an Angel" / "Emmanuelle in Bangkok"; Transliteration: "Emmanuelle wa Tenshi no Sasayaki" (Japanese: エマニエルは天使のささやき)	October 2, 1978
53	2	"The Maniacal Fantômas Mark III" / "I Melt with You"; Transliteration: "Kyooki no Fantoma Mark III" (Japanese: 狂気のファントマ·マークIII)	October 9, 1978
54	3	"Detective Hanshichi – The Tenth-Year Engagement" / "Mercy Mercy Me"; Transliteration: "Hanshichi Keiji Juunen no Yakusoku" (Japanese: 半七刑事十年目の約束)	October 16, 1978
55	4	"Mysterious Gang of Five [Part 1]" / "Kooky Kabuki – Part One"; Transliteration: "Hanafubuki Nazo no Goninshuu "Zempen"" (Japanese: 花吹雪 謎の五人衆"前篇")	October 23, 1978
56	5	"Mysterious Gang of Five [Part 2]" / "Kooky Kabuki – Part Two"; Transliteration: "Hanafubuki Nazo no Goninshuu "Koohen"" (Japanese: 花吹雪 謎の五人衆"後篇")	October 30, 1978
57	6	"Computer or Lupin?" / "Alter-Ego Maniac"; Transliteration: "Computer ka Lupin ka" (Japanese: コンピューターかルパンか)	November 6, 1978
58	7	"The Face of Goodbye at the National Border" / "Gettin' Jigen with It"; Transliteration: "Kokkyoo wa Wakare no Kao" (Japanese: 国境は別れの顔)	November 13, 1978
59	8	"The Mysterious World of Madame X" / "Madame Prefers Them Hand-Dipped"; Transliteration: "Madame X no Fushigina Sekai" (Japanese: マダムXの不思議な世界)	November 20, 1978
60	9	"Suicide Flowers Bloom in India" / "Holy Cow"; Transliteration: "Indo ni Jisatsu no Hana ga Saku" (Japanese: インドに自殺の花が咲く)	November 27, 1978
61	10	"The Flying Zantetsuken" / "The Yam Is Mightier Than the Sword"; Transliteration: "Soratobu Zantetsuken" (Japanese: 空飛ぶ斬鉄剣)	December 4, 1978
62	11	"The Sound of the Devil's Bell Calls Lupin" / "Church of the Poison Mind"; Transliteration: "Lupin o Yobu Akuma no Kane no Ne" (Japanese: ルパンを呼ぶ悪魔の鐘の音)	December 11, 1978
63	12	"A Trap for a Trap!" / "Charity Begins at Home"; Transliteration: "Wana ni wa Wana o" (Japanese: 罠には罠を!)	December 18, 1978
64	13	"Christmas is in the Goddess's Hands" / "Christmas at Tiffany's"; Transliteration: "Christmas wa Megami no Te ni" (Japanese: クリスマスは女神の手に)	December 25, 1978
65	14	"Lupin's Enemy is Lupin" / "Return of the x Factor"; Transliteration: "Lupin no Teki wa Lupin" (Japanese: ルパンの敵はルパン)	January 8, 1979
66	15	"Order: Shoot to Kill!!" / "Beauty and the Deceased"; Transliteration: "Shasatsu Meirei!!" (Japanese: 射殺命令!!)	January 15, 1979
67	16	"Lupin's Great Journey to the West" / "Monkey King Business"; Transliteration: "Lupin no Daisaiyuuki" (Japanese: ルパンの大西遊記)	January 22, 1979
68	17	"Casino Island – Inversion After Inversion" / "Games of Chance"; Transliteration: "Casino Too – Gyakuten Mata Gyakuten" (Japanese: カジノ島·逆転また逆転)	January 29, 1979
69	18	"The Woman Pops Fell in Love With" / "Zenigata Getcha into My Life"; Transliteration: "Tottsan no Horeta Hito" (Japanese: とっつあんの惚れた女)	February 5, 1979
70	19	"A Classical Thief and a Myna" / "Can't Beat the Classics"; Transliteration: "Classic Doroboo to Kyukanchoo" (Japanese: クラシック泥棒と九官鳥)	February 12, 1979
71	20	"Lupin vs. the Shinsengumi" / "Dangerous Dreamers"; Transliteration: "Lupin Tai Shinsengumi" (Japanese: ルパン対新選組)	February 19, 1979
72	21	"A Skateboard Murder Mystery" / "You're Sapphired!"; Transliteration: "Skateboard Satsujin Jiken" (Japanese: スケートボード殺人事件)	February 26, 1979
73	22	"Through Flowers or Storms: The Thieves' Race" / "It's a Purloin-a-Palooza!"; Transliteration: "Hana mo Arashi mo Doroboo Race" (Japanese: 花も嵐も泥棒レース)	March 5, 1979
74	23	"Terror of the Chameleon Man" / "For Larva or Money"; Transliteration: "Kyoofuu no Chameleon Ningen" (Japanese: 恐怖のカメレオン人間)	March 12, 1979
75	24	"A Wedding Dress Doesn't Suit Fujiko" / "The Bride Came D.O.A"; Transliteration: "Fujiko ni Hanayome Ishoo wa Niawanai" (Japanese: 不二子に花嫁衣装はにあわない)	March 19, 1979
76	25	"Do You Know Shakespeare?" / "Dark Charade"; Transliteration: "Shakespeare o Shitteru kai" (Japanese: シェークスピアを知ってるかい)	March 26, 1979
77	26	"Arresting Lupin with Astrology" / "Lupin's Psychic Fiend"; Transliteration: "Hoshiuranai de Lupin o Taiho" (Japanese: 星占いでルパンを逮捕)	April 2, 1979
78	27	"Diamonds Shining in the Robot's Eye" / "Ice, Robot"; Transliteration: "Robot no Me ni Dia ga Hikaru" (Japanese: ロボットの瞳にダイヤが光る)	April 9, 1979
79	28	"The Lupin Funeral March" / "Baton Death March"; Transliteration: "Lupin Soosookyoku" (Japanese: ルパン葬送曲)	April 16, 1979
80	29	"The Last Gift in Prison is Cup Ramen" / "Everybody Loves Ramen"; Transliteration: "Saigo no Sashiire wa Cup Ramen" (Japanese: 最後の差し入れはカップラーメン)	April 23, 1979
81	30	"Fujiko, Men Are a Sorry Lot!" / "Fujiko, Men Are a Sorry Lot!"; Transliteration: "Fujiko! Otoko wa Tsurai ze" (Japanese: 不二子!男はつらいぜ)	April 30, 1979
82	31	"Rescuing Pops" / "Hostage Rescue Operation: Daddio"; Transliteration: "Tottsan Hitojichi Kyuushutsu Sakusen" (Japanese: とっつあん人質救出作戦)	May 7, 1979
83	32	"Lupin's Big Western" / "Lupin in the Wild West"; Transliteration: "Lupin no Daiseibugeki" (Japanese: ルパンの大西部劇)	May 14, 1979
84	33	"Leave the Revenge to Lupin" / "Leave the Revenge to Lupin"; Transliteration: "Fukushuu wa Lupin ni Makasero" (Japanese: 復讐はルパンにまかせろ)	May 21, 1979
85	34	"The ICPO's Secret Plan" / "The Secret Order of ICPO"; Transliteration: "ICPO Maruhi Shirei" (Japanese: ICPO㊙指令)	May 28, 1979
86	35	"The Mysterious Nocturnal Mask" / "The Mysterious Nocturnal Mask"; Transliteration: "Nazo no Yakkoo Kamen Arawaru" (Japanese: 謎の夜光仮面現わる)	June 4, 1979
87	36	"When the Devil Calls to Lupin" / "When the Devil Calls to Lupin"; Transliteration: "Akuma ga Lupin o Maneku Toki" (Japanese: 悪魔がルパンを招くとき)	June 11, 1979
88	37	"Lupin's North Pole, South Pole Adventure" / "Lupin's North Pole, South Pole Adventures"; Transliteration: "Lupin no Nankyoku Hokkyoku Daibooken" (Japanese: ルパンの南極北極大冒険)	June 18, 1979
89	38	"Play the Thief's Symphony" / "Play the Thief's Symphony"; Transliteration: "Doroboo Kookyookyoku o Narase" (Japanese: ドロボウ交響曲を鳴らせ)	June 25, 1979
90	39	"Bad Guys Make the Worst Crooks" / "The Badder A Guy, The More Villainous He Is"; Transliteration: "Warui Yatsu Hodo Daiakutoo" (Japanese: 悪い奴ほど大悪党)	July 2, 1979
91	40	"The Time-Traveling Girl" / "The Time Traveling Girl"; Transliteration: "Toki o Kakeru Shoojo" (Japanese: 時を駆ける少女)	July 9, 1979
92	41	"The Madam and the Robber's Quartet" / "The Merry Widow and the Robber's Quartette"; Transliteration: "Madame to Doroboo Quartet" (Japanese: マダムと泥棒四重奏)	July 16, 1979
93	42	"Invading the Great Wall" / "Operation INVADER at the Great Wall of China"; Transliteration: "Banri no Choojoo Invader Sakusen" (Japanese: 万里の長城インベーダー作戦)	July 23, 1979
94	43	"Lupin vs. Superman" / "Lupin Vs. Superman"; Transliteration: "Lupin tai Superman" (Japanese: ルパン対スーパーマン)	July 30, 1979
95	44	"From the Ghost Ship with Love" / "From the Ghost Ship with Love"; Transliteration: "Yuureisen Yori Ai o Komete" (Japanese: 幽霊船より愛をこめて)	August 6, 1979
96	45	"Lupin's Gourmet World" / "Lupin's Gourmet World"; Transliteration: "Lupin no Oryoori Tengoku" (Japanese: ルパンのお料理天国)	August 13, 1979
97	46	"Find Lupin the First's Treasure" / "Searching for Lupin I's Treasure"; Transliteration: "Lupin Issei no Hihoo o Sagase" (Japanese: ルパン一世の秘宝を探せ)	August 20, 1979
98	47	"The Day Pops Was Gone" / "The Day Without Daddio"; Transliteration: "Tottsan no Inai Hi" (Japanese: 父っつあんのいない日)	August 27, 1979
99	48	"The Scattered Magnum" / "Fighting Jigen"; Transliteration: "Kooya ni Chitta Combat Magnum" (Japanese: 荒野に散ったコンバット·マグナム)	September 3, 1979
100	49	"The Ultra Train Heist Plan" / "The Ultra Operation in the Train"; Transliteration: "Meiga Goodatsu Ultra Sakusen" (Japanese: 名画強奪ウルトラ作戦)	September 10, 1979
101	50	"Versailles, Burning with Love" / "Fervent Love at Versailles"; Transliteration: "Versailles wa Ai ni Moeta" (Japanese: ベルサイユは愛に燃えた)	September 17, 1979
102	51	"Lupin, Do You Like Chanel?" / "Lupin, Do You Like Chanel?"; Transliteration: "Lupin wa Chanel ga Osuki" (Japanese: ルパンはシャネルがお好き)	September 24, 1979
103	52	"The Wolf Saw an Angel" / "The Wolf Looked at an Angel!"; Transliteration: "Ookami wa Tenshi o Mita" (Japanese: 狼は天使を見た)	October 1, 1979

=== Season 4 (1979–80) ===
No. overall	No. in season	Japanese translated title / English title (Note: "English titles" are those found on the Crunchyroll streaming broadcast of the series, with alternate titles for episodes 145 and 155 coming from Streamline Pictures' VHS release of "Lupin III's Greatest Capers".)	Original release date
104	1	"The Most Dangerous Golden Bed" / "The Most Dangerous Golden Bed"; Transliteration: "Mottomo Kiken-na Oogon Bed" (Japanese: もっとも危険な黄金ベッド)	October 8, 1979
105	2	"The Mystery of Demon's Head Island" / "The Mystery of Demon's Head Island"; Transliteration: "Kaiki Onikubitoo ni Onna ga Kieta" (Japanese: 怪奇鬼首島に女が消えた)	October 15, 1979
106	3	"You're the Cat, I'm the Fish" / "A Cat for You! Dried Bonito for Me!"; Transliteration: "Kima wa Neko Boku wa Katsuobushi" (Japanese: 君はネコぼくはカツオ節)	October 22, 1979
107	4	"The Curse of the Wedding Ring" / "The Wedding Ring is a Cursed Trap"; Transliteration: "Kekkon Yubiwa wa Noroi no Wana" (Japanese: 結婚指輪は呪いの罠)	October 29, 1979
108	5	"Zantetsuken's Lament" / "Iron Cutter Sword With Blues"; Transliteration: "Kanashimi no Zantetsuken" (Japanese: 哀しみの斬鉄剣)	November 5, 1979
109	6	"Lupin's Toughest Fight Ever" / "Lupin Only Lives Twice"; Transliteration: "Lupin Shijoo Saidai no Kusen" (Japanese: ルパン史上最大の苦戦)	November 12, 1979
110	7	"Fujiko's Candid Photo" / "Sharp Shot! This is Fujiko"; Transliteration: "Gekisha Kore ga Fujiko da" (Japanese: 激写これが不二子だ)	November 19, 1979
111	8	"Is the Invaders Safe Open?" / "Enjoy the Invaders Game"; Transliteration: "Invader Kinko wa Hiraita ka?" (Japanese: インベーダー金庫は開いたか?)	November 26, 1979
112	9	"Goemon's Close Call" / "Danger! Goemon"; Transliteration: "Goemon Kikiippatsu" (Japanese: 五ェ門危機一髪)	December 3, 1979
113	10	"Operation Chushingura" / "OPERATION 'CHUSHINGURA"; Transliteration: "Sakusenna wa Chuushingura" (Japanese: 作戦名は忠臣蔵)	December 10, 1979
114	11	"The Secret of the First Supper" / "The Secret of the First Supper"; Transliteration: "Meiga Saisho no Banshoku no Himitsu" (Japanese: 迷画最初の晩餐の秘密)	December 17, 1979
115	12	"Mona Lisa Smiles Twice" / "Mona Lisa Smiles Twice"; Transliteration: "Mona Lisa wa Nido Warau" (Japanese: モナリザは二度微笑う)	December 24, 1979
116	13	"When's the 108th Bell?" / "Has the Bells Rung 108 Times?"; Transliteration: "108tsu no Kane wa Natta ka" (Japanese: 108つの鐘は鳴ったか)	December 31, 1979
117	14	"The Bubble Gum Disguise Plan" / "The Strategy of the Chewing Gum Disguise"; Transliteration: "Chewing Gum Hensoo Sakusen" (Japanese: チューインガム変装作戦)	January 7, 1980
118	15	"The Southern Cross Looked Like Diamonds" / "Diamonds in the Southern Cross"; Transliteration: "Minami Juujisei ga Dia ni Mieta" (Japanese: 南十字星がダイヤに見えた)	January 14, 1980
119	16	"Lupin, Who Killed Lupin" / "Lupin Kills Lupin"; Transliteration: "Lupin o Koroshita Lupin" (Japanese: ルパンを殺したルパン)	January 21, 1980
120	17	"Frankenstein Attacks Lupin" / "Frankenstein Attacks Lupin"; Transliteration: "Frankenstein Lupin o Osou" (Japanese: フランケンシュタイン ルパンを襲う)	January 28, 1980
121	18	"The Treasure My Grandfather Left Behind" / "A Treasure My Grandfather Left"; Transliteration: "Ore no Jiisan ga Nokoshita Takaramono" (Japanese: オレの爺さんが残した宝物)	February 4, 1980
122	19	"Rare Find: Napoleon's Fortune" / "An Unusual End to an Expedition for Napoleon’s Treasure"; Transliteration: "Chinhakken Napoleon no Zaihoo" (Japanese: 珍発見ナポレオンの財宝)	February 11, 1980
123	20	"Paris Is for Thieves" / "Robbery in Paris"; Transliteration: "Doroboo wa Pari de" (Japanese: 泥棒はパリで)	February 18, 1980
124	21	"1999: A Popcorn Odyssey" / "Nineteen Ninety Nine Popcorn Trip"; Transliteration: "1999nen Popcorn no Tabi" (Japanese: 1999年ポップコーンの旅)	February 25, 1980
125	22	"The Big Oildollar Plot" / "The Scheme for Oil Dollars"; Transliteration: "Oildollar no Daibooryaku" (Japanese: オイルダラーの大謀略)	March 3, 1980
126	23	"Together with Lupin to Hell" / "Take Lupin All The Way to Hell"; Transliteration: "Jigoku e Lupin o Michizure" (Japanese: 地獄へルパンを道づれ)	March 10, 1980
127	24	"Direct Hit! Operation Dead Ball" / "The Direct Attack! Dead Ball Strategy"; Transliteration: "Chokugeki! Deadball Sakusen" (Japanese: 直撃!デッドボール作戦)	March 17, 1980
128	25	"The Old Woman and Lupin Thievery Contest" / "Lupin and An Old Woman's Scheme"; Transliteration: "Rooba to Lupin no Doroboo Kassen" (Japanese: 老婆とルパンの泥棒合戦)	March 24, 1980
129	26	"In Jigen, I Saw the Gentleness of a Man's Soul" / "The Kindness Of Jigen is Seen"; Transliteration: "Jigen ni Otokogokoro no Yasashisa o MIta" (Japanese: 次元に男心の優しさを見た)	March 31, 1980
130	27	"Lupin Vs. the Mystery Man with Two Faces" / "Lupin vs The Man of Two Faces"; Transliteration: "Lupin tai Kaijin Nimensoo" (Japanese: ルパン対奇人二面相)	April 7, 1980
131	28	"Two Goemons - the Mystery of Zantetsuken" / "The Secret of Goemon's Zantetsu Sword"; Transliteration: "Futari Goemon - Zantetsuken no Nazo" (Japanese: 二人五ェ門斬鉄剣の謎)	April 14, 1980
132	29	"The Himalayan Holy Mountain Thieves' Cult" / "The Himalayan Thief Group"; Transliteration: "Reizan Himalaya no Doroboo Kyoodan" (Japanese: 霊山ヒマラヤの泥棒教団)	April 21, 1980
133	30	"Keep Your Hands Off the Hot Treasure" / "Don't Steal the Hot Treasure"; Transliteration: "Atsui Otakara ni Te o Dasu na" (Japanese: 熱いお宝に手を出すな)	April 28, 1980
134	31	"The Climactic Lupin Arrest Operation" / "The Surrounded Summit Strategy"; Transliteration: "Lupin Taihoo Choojoo Sakusen" (Japanese: ルパン逮捕頂上作戦)	May 5, 1980
135	32	"Poison and Magic and Lupin III" / "The Poison Trio"; Transliteration: "Dokuyaku to Majutsu to Lupin Sansei" (Japanese: 毒薬と魔術とルパン三世)	May 12, 1980
136	33	"Revenge of the Gold Butterfly" / "The Golden Butterfly takes Revenge"; Transliteration: "Gold Butterfly no Fukushuu" (Japanese: ゴールドバタフライの復讐)	May 19, 1980
137	34	"The Magnificent Team-Play Operation" / "Team Work"; Transliteration: "Kareinaru Teamplay Sakusen" (Japanese: 華麗なるチームプレイ作戦)	May 26, 1980
138	35	"The Treasure of Pompeii and Venomous Snakes" / "Pompeii's Secret and the Treasure"; Transliteration: "Pompeii no Hihoo to Dokuhebi" (Japanese: ポンペイの秘宝と毒蛇)	June 2, 1980
139	36	"Steal Everything of Lupin's" / "Steal Everything from Lupin"; Transliteration: "Lupin no Subete o Nusume" (Japanese: ルパンのすべてを盗め)	June 9, 1980
140	37	"Wolf, Run, Pig, Fall Down" / "The Wolf Runs and the Pig Rolls"; Transliteration: "Ookami wa Hashire Buta wa Korogare" (Japanese: 狼は走れ豚は転がれ)	June 16, 1980
141	38	"1980 Moscow Revelation" / "Apocalypse of Moscow 1980"; Transliteration: "1980 Moskwa Mokushiroku" (Japanese: 1980モスクワ黙示録)	June 30, 1980
142	39	"The Big Favorite Disappeared at the Grand Race" / "The Disappearing Favourite"; Transliteration: "The Big Favorite Disappeared at the Grand Race" (Japanese: グランドレース消えた大本命)	July 7, 1980
143	40	"The Miami Bank Raid Anniversary" / "The Miami Bank"; Transliteration: "Miami Ginkoo Shuugeki Kinembi" (Japanese: マイアミ銀行襲撃記念日)	July 14, 1980
144	41	"Fujiko's Close Call Rescue Operation" / "Hair breadth rescue operation for Fujiko"; Transliteration: "Fujiko Kikiippatsu Kyuushutsu Sakusen" (Japanese: 不二子危機一髪救出作戦)	July 21, 1980
145	42	"Wings of Death - Albatross" / "Albatross: Wings of Death" (Streamline) "Wings of Death, Albatross" (Crunchyroll); Transliteration: "Shi no Tsubasa Albatross" (Japanese: 死の翼アルバトロス)	July 28, 1980
146	43	"Lupin's Splendid Failure" / "Lupin is Defeated"; Transliteration: "Lupin Kareinaru Haiboku" (Japanese: ルパン華麗なる敗北)	August 4, 1980
147	44	"The Mermaid That Disappeared in the Midnight Sun" / "The Mermaid That Disappear in the Midnight Sun"; Transliteration: "Byakuya ni Kieta Ningyo" (Japanese: 白夜に消えた人魚)	August 11, 1980
148	45	"The Target Is 555 Meters" / "The Target is Five Hundred and Fifty Five Meters Away"; Transliteration: "Target wa 555 M" (Japanese: ターゲットは555M)	August 18, 1980
149	46	"The Treasure of Mecca Wore a Veil" / "Mecca Robbery"; Transliteration: "Veil o Haida Mecca no Hihoo" (Japanese: ベールをはいだメッカの秘宝)	August 25, 1980
150	47	"Piano Symphony "Zoo"" / "Piano Symphony "Zoo""; Transliteration: "Piano Kookyookyoku "Doobutsuen"" (Japanese: ピアノ交響曲「動物園」)	September 1, 1980
151	48	"The Arrest Lupin Highway Operation" / "To Arrest Lupin, the Mission at Highway"; Transliteration: "Lupin Taiho Highway Sakusen" (Japanese: ルパン逮捕ハイウェイ作戦)	September 8, 1980
152	49	"Jigen and a Hat and a Pistol" / "Jigen and The Hatless Pistol"; Transliteration: "Jigen to Booshi to Kenjuu to" (Japanese: 次元と帽子と拳銃と)	September 15, 1980
153	50	"The Bills That Came from God" / "Money from Heaven"; Transliteration: "Kamisama no Kureta Satsutaba" (Japanese: 神様のくれた札束)	September 22, 1980
154	51	"The Hexagon's Great Legacy" / "Hexagon's Fabulous Legacy"; Transliteration: "Hexagon no Ooinaru Isan" (Japanese: ヘクサゴンの大いなる遺産)	September 29, 1980
155	52	"Farewell My Beloved Lupin" / "Aloha Lupin" (Streamline) "Thieves Love the Peace" (Crunchyroll); Transliteration: "Saraba Itoshiki Lupin yo" (Japanese: さらば愛しきルパンよ)	October 6, 1980

== See also ==
- Lupin III
- List of Lupin III Part I episodes
- List of Lupin III Part III episodes
- List of Lupin III: The Woman Called Fujiko Mine episodes
- List of Lupin III Part IV episodes
- List of Lupin III Part 5 episodes
- List of Lupin III Part 6 episodes
- List of Lupin III television specials
