= List of Lupin the Third: The Woman Called Fujiko Mine episodes =

Lupin the Third: The Woman Called Fujiko Mine
- No. of episodes: 13

Release
- Original network: NTV
- Original release: April 4 – June 27, 2012

Lupin the Third: The Woman Called Fujiko Mine is a 2012 Japanese anime series based on Monkey Punch's Lupin III manga. Produced by TMS Entertainment and Po10tial, the series aired on NTV between April 4, 2012, and June 27, 2012. It focuses on the franchise's heroine, Fujiko Mine, as she undergoes various missions and encounters the rest of the Lupin III cast for the first time. Unlike the franchise's previous three televised anime, The Woman Called Fujiko Mine is more sexually oriented in order to capture the "sensuality" present in the original manga as well as darker and more serious. It is also the first in which Lupin is not the protagonist.

Sayo Yamamoto is the director of the series, making it the first Lupin title to be directed by a woman, and Takeshi Koike was the character designer and animation director. Mari Okada was the main writer of the series, although Itsuko Miyoshi (ep 2), Dai Satō (ep 3, 7, 10), Shinsuke Ōnishi (ep 5) and Junji Nishimura (ep 8) served as episode writers. The opening theme is "New Wuthering Heights" (新・嵐が丘, Shin Arashi ga Oka) by Naruyoshi Kikuchi, who also wrote the in-show music, and Pepe Tormento Azcarar feat. Ichiko Hashimoto, while the ending theme is "Duty Friend" by NIKIIE.

VAP released the anime on home video in four-disc DVD and Blu-ray box sets on September 19, 2012. Funimation simulcasted the series, with English subtitles, on their website and Nico Nico for North American audiences as it aired in Japan. On July 28 at Otakon 2012, they announced that they also acquired the home video rights to the series. They released The Woman Called Fujiko Mine in Blu-ray and Blu-ray/DVD sets on August 20, 2013, including an English-language dub. Manga Entertainment released a similar set in the United Kingdom on September 16, whereas Hanabee released it in Australasia in two parts, on October 16 and November 20.

== Episode list ==
No.	Title	Directed by	Written by	Original release date
1	"Master Thief vs. Lady Looter"; Transliteration: "Daidorobō VS onna kaitō" (Japanese: 大泥棒VS女怪盗)	Tōru Takahashi	Mari Okada	April 4, 2012 (Note: Because the show aired at 1:29 am, it technically debuted on April 5, 2012. However, the official debut date is listed as April 4. This dating method is continued with all the episodes.)
Tells the story of how Fujiko Mine first met Lupin III. Fujiko is on a mission to infiltrate a drug operation, which is not helped by the arrival of master thief Lupin.
2	".357 Magnum"; Transliteration: ".357 magunamu" (Japanese: .357マグナム)	Hideki Tonokatsu	Itsuko Miyoshi	April 11, 2012
After losing a bet and becoming the property of a female casino owner, Fujiko is sent on a mission to steal Daisuke Jigen's .357 Magnum.
3	"The Lady and the Samurai"; Transliteration: "Shukujo to samurai" (Japanese: 淑女とサムライ)	Yasuo Tsuchiya	Dai Satō	April 18, 2012
As Fujiko goes undercover as a tutor looking after some children in order to steal some treasures on a train, she meets the samurai Goemon Ishikawa, who is on a mission to assassinate the children's grandfather, King Trunc. When a third party orchestrates the deaths of both Trunc and Goemon by sending the train out of control, Fujiko and Goemon work together to save everyone by separating the cars full of passengers from those carrying the treasures.
4	"Vissi d'arte, Vissi d'amore" Transliteration: "Uta ni iki, koi ni iki" (Japanese: 歌に生き、恋に生き)	Tomio Yamauchi	Mari Okada	April 25, 2012
In order to be released from police custody, Fujiko has sex with Inspector Zenigata and is then told to protect a jewel-studded mask worn by an opera singer named Ayan Maya from being stolen by Lupin. As the performance goes on that night, a mysterious 'phantom of the opera' makes an attempt on Ayan's life. As Ayan faints from the experience, Fujiko is cast as her stand-in to draw out Lupin. However, Fujiko is soon trapped, discovering that the attempt on Ayan's life was a fake, while Lupin reveals the Ayan on stage is actually a stagehand. As Zenigata chases after Lupin, Fujiko chases after the phantom, Darenzo, and meets the real Ayan, who had been living underneath the opera house with Dorenzo. As Ayan explains the decisions she's made, she decides to burn the mask before inviting Fujiko and Lupin to join them for dinner.
5	"Blood-Soaked Triangle"; Transliteration: "Chi nureta sankaku" (Japanese: 血濡れた三角)	Shin Itagaki	Dai Satō	May 2, 2012
As Lupin attempts to woo Fujiko, she tells him about a jewel peacock at the bottom of a pyramid in Egypt. Meanwhile, Jigen, who is short on cash after being scammed, goes on a search for the peacock as well. Jigen soon finds himself fighting against not only Lupin, but the various traps set up by looters. After both Lupin and Jigen fall into a trap together, Fujiko appears revealing the peacock will only appear if one of them dies in the trap. However, they both manage to escape by sacrificing some scorpions. The peacock reveals itself, but Fujiko is forced to give it up in order to escape from the pyramid. Lupin and Jigen go their separate ways, having gained each other's respect.
6	"Prison of Love"; Transliteration: "Ai no rōgoku" (Japanese: 愛の牢獄)	Shōko Nakamura; Hideki Tonokatsu	Mari Okada	May 9, 2012
Fujiko begins work as a teacher at an all-girls school, where she immediately finds herself the target of affection for many of the students, including a shy girl named Isolde Brach. Fujiko starts to take an interest in Isolde and the two grow closer. After Isolde is bullied by her jealous classmates, she turns to Fujiko for a night of passion. However, it is soon revealed that Isolde is actually Zenigata's assistant, Oscar, who took the real Isolde's place in order to catch both Fujiko and Lupin. The next day, Oscar initiates a plan to capture Lupin. However by that time, he had already freed Fujiko, who tricks Oscar into giving her the code for a pendant containing a thesis by Isolde's late father. As Fujiko and Lupin escape and share the spoils, Oscar swears to get revenge on Fujiko.
7	"Music and Revolution"; Transliteration: "Ongaku to kakumei" (Japanese: 音楽と革命)	Akira Nishimori	Dai Satō	May 16, 2012
Fujiko and Goemon become involved in a case that could very well lead to World War III.
8	"Dying Day"; Transliteration: "Meinichi" (Japanese: 命日)	Tōru Takahashi	Junji Nishimura	May 23, 2012
Fortune-teller Shitoto can guess the "Death Date" of any person. The victims are all former marks of Lupin III. Jigen is hired to destroy the lithograph Shitoto uses to read these fortunes. Lupin teams up with Jigen, however, Lieutenant Oscar is waiting for him. What does this fortune teller have in store for the fate of Fujiko?
9	"Love Wreathed in Steam"; Transliteration: "Yukemuri bojō" (Japanese: 湯けむり慕情)	Yasuo Tsuchiya	Mari Okada	May 30, 2012
Lupin and Jigen find themselves looking after a girl who was used as a living piece of art. The girl has no name as the artist treated her no more than an object. While their motives for taking her are unknown, the girl bonds with Jigen. The trio have trouble evading Fujiko, who desperately wants to kill the girl for personal reasons. Eventually Fujiko corners Lupin and the girl at a hot springs, but is unable to kill her after Lupin warns her that a spark from her gun would kill them all. He asks Fujiko her reasons for trying to kill the girl and deduces that Fujiko sees the girl to be like herself. Both women have had their lives altered and manipulated by outside forces. When Fujiko sees this as the truth she leaves, completely stunned. Lupin and Jigen cover the girl's tattoos and leave her at a Buddhist temple, hoping she can have a real life.
10	"Ghost Town"; Transliteration: "Shinda machi" (Japanese: 死んだ街)	Naoki Hishikawa	Dai Satō	June 6, 2012
Lupin investigates a group of owl people who desire Fujiko and begins to learn more about Fujiko's past while fighting off illusions brought on by a strange drug.
11	"The Feast of Fools"; Transliteration: "Orokamono no matsuri" (Japanese: 愚か者の祭)	Fukurōkōji Pāchiku; Yuzuru Tachikawa	Mari Okada	June 13, 2012
As Goemon tries to look after Fujiko, Oscar disguises himself as Fujiko and frames her for various crimes in an attempt to win Zenigata's affection.
12	"The Woman Called Fujiko Mine (Part 1)"; Transliteration: "Mine Fujiko to iu onna (zenpen)" (Japanese: 峰不二子という女 （前篇）)	Nana Harada; Makoto Sudō	Mari Okada	June 20, 2012
Fujiko, Zenigata, Lupin, and Jigen go to a strange theme park to finally confront Fujiko's past, and the deranged Count Luis Yu Almeida.
13	"The Woman Called Fujiko Mine (Part 2)"; Transliteration: "Mine Fujiko to iu onna (kōhen)" (Japanese: 峰不二子という女 （後篇）)	Makoto Sudō; Naoki Hishikawa; Yasuo Tsuchiya; Sayo Yamamoto	Mari Okada	June 27, 2012
Fujiko enters a chamber where Count Luis Yu Almeida is sitting and waiting for her, however Lupin interferes from a communications room, revealing the Count to be dead. Jigen accidentally inhales the Fraulein Eule Cult drug, which causes him to hallucinate and shoot at Lupin, causing Lupin to flee. Fujiko falls into another chamber where a message appears in blocks and Lupin assists Fujiko in reaching the top of the chamber. In a special room, Lupin explains the real events that occurred during the tragedy of Eulenspiegel and the Count's process of brutally inducing mind control on little girls. Also in the room lies Dr. Kaiser's real daughter, Aisha, who is bedridden after years of being experimented on by Count Almeida and is now frail and weakened. Fujiko reveals that she entered the manor as a maid and intended to steal the Fraulein Eule cult drug, however she was cornered by Almeida's men and experimented on as well. Aisha found Fujiko's drive to steal and indulge in sex intriguing, and chose to have her memories implanted into Fujiko in order live vicariously through Fujiko and causing Fujiko to believe that she has been Aisha all along. As the conversation draws to a close, Lupin steals Aisha and unmasks "Minerva's" Owl who happens to be Aisha's mother who survived the Eulenspiegel tragedy. Lupin and Fujiko bring Aisha to a coastline, but Aisha succumbs due to her weakened state. As they drive off, Fujiko challenges Lupin to steal her after she steals a bolt from Lupin's car, causing it to disassemble and stranding Lupin in the middle of the road.

== See also ==
- Lupin III
- List of Lupin III Part I episodes
- List of Lupin III Part II episodes
- List of Lupin III Part III episodes
- List of Lupin III Part IV episodes
- List of Lupin III Part 5 episodes
- List of Lupin III Part 6 episodes
- List of Lupin III television specials
