= Supervillain =

Variant of the villain character type possessing "supernatural or superhuman powers"

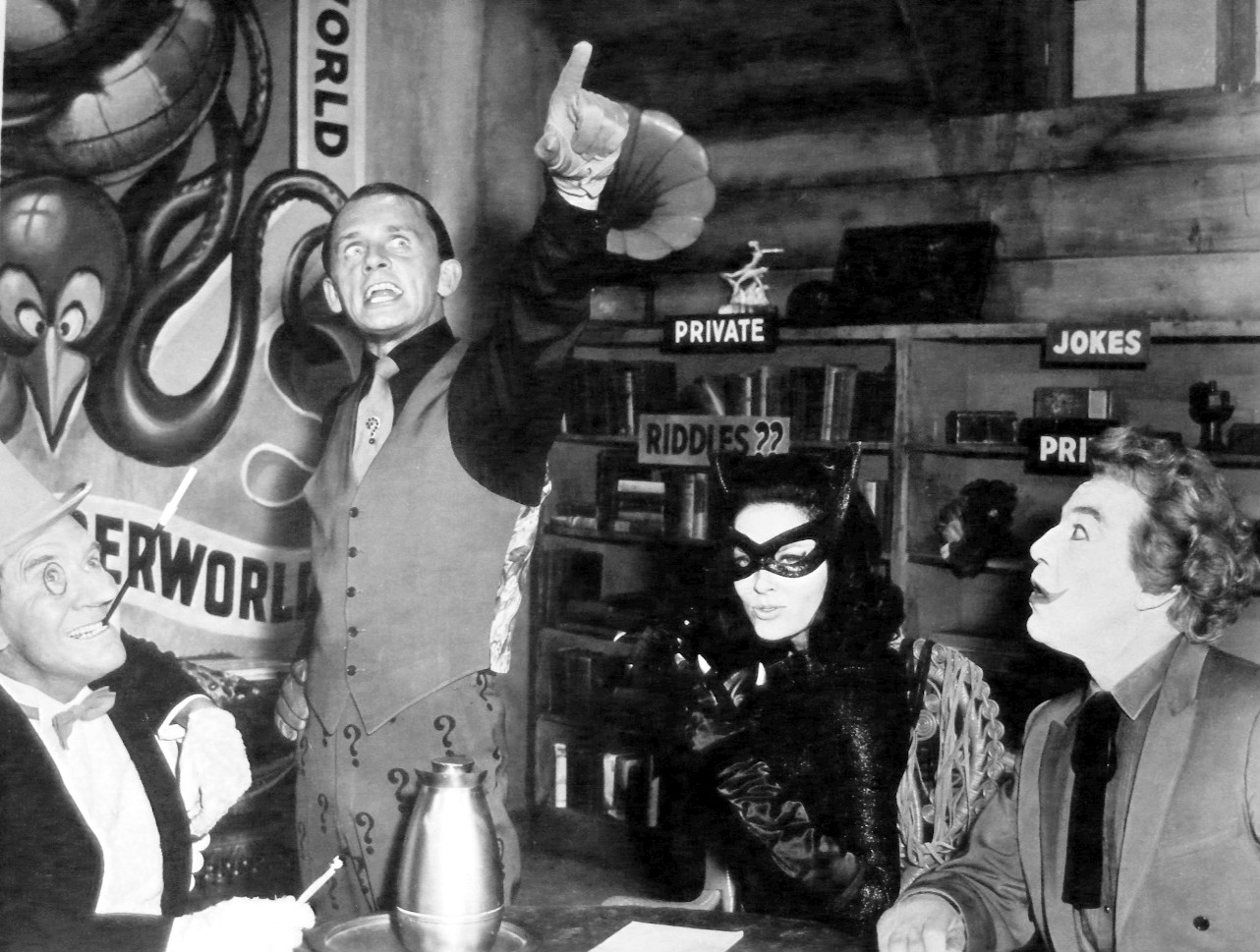
Supervillains of the United Underworld from the 1966 film Batman, a film adaptation of the comic books based on Batman and the 1960s television show of the same name. From left to right: Penguin, Riddler, Catwoman, and Joker.

A supervillain, supervillainess or supercriminal is a variant of the villainous stock character. The character is a common archetype in comic books and other popular culture, often acting as the primary adversary of superheroes.

Supervillains are often noted for their ability to foil heroes through the use of superpowers, their mental or physical capabilities, or their criminal influence, often creating grandiose schemes for nefarious purposes, such as world domination.

== Description ==
Supervillains are often used as foils to present a daunting challenge to a superhero. In instances where the supervillain does not have superhuman, mystical, or alien powers, the supervillain may possess a genius intellect or a skill set that allows them to draft complex schemes or commit crimes in a way which normal humans cannot. Other traits may include megalomania and possession of considerable resources to further their aims. Many supervillains share some typical characteristics of real-world dictators, gangsters, mad scientists, trophy hunters, warlords, corrupt businesspeople, serial killers, and terrorists, often having an aspiration of world domination.

== Notable supervillains ==
The Joker, Lex Luthor, Doctor Doom, Magneto, Brainiac, Deathstroke, the Green Goblin, Loki, the Reverse-Flash, Black Manta, Ultron, Thanos, and Darkseid are some notable male comic book supervillains that have been adapted in film and television. Some notable female supervillains are Catwoman, Harley Quinn, Poison Ivy, Mystique, Dark Phoenix, Hela, and the Cheetah.

Just like superheroes, supervillains are sometimes members of groups, such as the Injustice League, the Sinister Six, the Legion of Doom, the Brotherhood of Mutants, the Suicide Squad, and the Masters of Evil.

In the documentary A Study in Sherlock, writers Steven Moffat and Mark Gatiss said they regarded Professor James Moriarty as a supervillain because he possesses genius-level intelligence and powers of observation and deduction, setting him above ordinary people to the point where only he can pose a credible threat to Sherlock Holmes.

One of the earliest examples is John Devil, created by Paul Féval, père, in 1862, followed by the Machiavellian Colonel Bozzo-Corona, leader of the criminal organization Les Habits Noirs, also by Féval, in 1863.

The earliest known supervillain in Japanese media is the archenemy of Ōgon Bat (known for being considered Japan's eldest superhero) being Dr. Erich Nazō originally debuting in kamishibai performances in 1930 as "Kuro Bat" and used to be the franchise's title character, depicted as a phantom thief committing robberies until Ōgon Bat debuted and defeated him. Since Ōgon Bat was more popular with children, Kuro Bat was reworked as the series' main villain he is better known as to this day as "Dr. Nazō" with Ōgon Bat taking the latter's place as the titular protagonist since 1931.

Another example of a pioneering villain is Zigomar, a character created by Léon Sazie in 1909 for the Le Matin newspaper. Zigomar is a masked criminal wearing a red hood, leader of the "Gang of Z," who terrorized Paris with his ingenious crimes. The character's success was so great that Victorin Jasset directed three films based on his adventures between 1911 and 1913: Zigomar, roi des voleurs, Zigomar contre Nick Carter and Zigomar, peau d'anguille.

In 1911, Fantômas emerged, created by Marcel Allain and Pierre Souvestre. A master of disguise and crime, Fantômas became an iconic figure in French popular culture. Filmmaker Louis Feuillade further solidified his fame by directing five silent serials starring the character: Fantômas (1913), Juve contre Fantômas (1913), Le Mort Qui Tue (1913), Fantômas contre Fantômas (1914), and Le Faux Magistrat (1914). After the success of the first Fantômas serial, Feuillade had been criticized for glorifying outlaws, his next serial for Gaumont, Judex, starred this time a positive hero, a mysterious avenger conceived as an honest version of Fantômas. Judex was himself featured in various adaptations, sequels and remakes. The original Judex serial was released in the United States and appears to have been an inspiration for the American pulp character The Shadow, who was himself an inspiration for Batman.

Fu Manchu is an archetypal evil criminal genius and mad scientist created by English author Sax Rohmer in 1913. The Fu Manchu moustache became integral to stereotypical cinematic and television depictions of Chinese villains. Between 1965 and 1969 Christopher Lee played Fu Manchu five times in film, and in 1973 the character first appeared in Marvel Comics.

The James Bond arch-villain Ernst Stavro Blofeld (whose scenes often show him sitting on an armchair stroking his cat, his face unseen) has influenced supervillain tropes in popular cinema, including parodies like Dr. Claw and M.A.D. Cat from the Inspector Gadget animated series, Dr. Evil and Mr. Bigglesworth from the Austin Powers film series, or Dr. Blowhole from the animated TV series The Penguins of Madagascar.

The overarching villain of Star Wars, Emperor Palpatine, leads the tyrannical Galactic Empire, and was inspired by real-world tyrannical leaders.

While most supervillains are typically focused on selfish aspirations, there are some who come from tragic circumstances, similar to that of a superhero's. One such example includes Mr. Freeze, a villain from the Batman comics. While originally devised as a simple ice-themed villain, Freeze was later rewritten by Paul Dini to be a tragic character for Batman: The Animated Series, wherein his motivations in supervillainy are to save his wife from a mysterious virus, for which he has incubated her within a cryochamber, placing her in cryostasis. After the success of the episode, Mr. Freeze was later retconned within DC comics to reflect the version depicted in the animated series.

== See also ==
- Archenemy
- Dark Lord
- Lists of villains
  - List of comic book supervillain debuts
  - List of female supervillains
- Mad scientist
- Masked villain
- Rogues gallery
- Superhero fiction
