= Burr Middleton =

American actor

- Born: February 14, 1941 (age 85); Los Angeles, California, US
- Occupations: Actor; Voice actor; Singer; Musician
- Relatives: Charles Middleton (Grandfather)

Burmon Middleton Hoyle (born February 14, 1941), better known as Burr Middleton or Burr Hoyle, is an American actor and assistant director, known for Hunter's Blood (1986), Hunter (1984) and Latitude Zero (1969), and both the narrator and Captain Marvel/Billy Batson in The Kid Super Power Hour with Shazam! He also did many dubs in Japanese media with Frontier Enterprises.

== Films ==
- Adam Ruins Everything (Old Poll Worker)
- Parks and Recreation (Clyde)
- Star Trek: Enterprise (Newsreel Narrator)
- The Rules of Etiquette (Narrator)
- Malcolm & Eddie (The Announcer)
- Not of This World (Security Officer)
- Manhunt: Search for the Night Stalker (LAPD Rubino (as Burr Middelton)
- Matlock (Postal Inspector)
- Capone Behind Bars (Reporter)
- Dead Solid Perfect (1st Official)
- In the Mood (FBI Agent Harrow)
- The Twilight Zone (Policeman Richie's Dad)
- Hunter (Bailiff)
- LBJ: The Early Years (Uncredited role)
- Hunter's Blood (BBQ man #1)
- Mistress of the Apes (Doctor)
- Goodbye, Norma Jean, (Sleasy Photographer)
- Bronk Attorney (Uncredited role)
- Free as the Wind Narrator (Uncredited role)
- The Now People The Announcer (as Mickey Middleton)
- The Choppers (Snooper (as Mickey Hoyle))

== Voice roles ==
- The Kid Super Power Hour with Shazam! (Captain Marvel/Billy Batson)
- Hero High (Captain Marvel/Billy Batson)
- The Green Slime (voice, uncredited)
- Latitude Zero (Additional Voices)
- Medal of Honor: Pacific Assault Video Game (uncredited role)

== Dubbing ==
- Phantaman (1967-1968) (Fantoma, Dr. Zero, Gabby, narrator)
- Choppy and the Princess (Prince Franz Charming, Duke Duralumin)
