= Mike Worman =

American actor

Michael Worman
- Born: Michael James Worman; June 21, 1941 (age 83); Antigo, Wisconsin, U.S.
- Occupation: Voice actor
- Years active: 1970's-2000

Michael James Worman (born May 1, 1944) is a former Tokyo-based American voice actor who did work for Frontier Enterprises.

Characterized by his distinct high-pitched voice, he did voice acting work for the company from sometime in the mid 1970s until its closure in 2000 (with his last credited role being Pierre Simon in Covert Ops: Nuclear Dawn). Aside from his acting career, Worman also co-authored the book Practical Thai Cooking with Puangkram Smith in 1985. He since retired back to his native Wisconsin.

== Filmography ==
=== Anime Dubbing ===
==== OVAs & Specials ====
- Rain Boy (1989) - Father

==== Anime films ====
- Lupin the 3rd: The Mystery of Mamo (1978) - Mamo (Frontier Dub)
- Cyborg 009: The Legend of the Super Galaxy (1980) - Dr. Cosmo
- Voltus 5 (1980) - Zuhl
- Space Warrior Baldios (1981) - Dr. Carter
- Swan Lake (1981) - Minister (Frontier Dub)
- Aladdin & the Wonderful Lamp (1982) - Sultan (Frontier Dub)
- Arcadia of My Youth (1982) - Triter

==== Video games ====
- Chase the Express (2000) - Pierre Simon
