= Dr. Nazo =

- Created by: Takeo Nagamatsu; Suzuki Ichiro
- Portrayed by: Kouji Sekiyama (Golden Bat (1966))
- Voiced by: Ushio Shima (Golden Bat (1967-68))

In-universe information
- Full name: Dr. Erich Nazō
- Gender: Male
- Occupation: Supervillain

Dr. Erich Nazō (Japanese: ナゾー; sometimes known as Dr. Zero outside of Japan), originally known as Black Bat (Japanese: 黒バット, Hepburn: Kuro Batto), is a Japanese supervillain created by Takeo Nagamatsu and Suzuki Ichiro in 1930 and is the main antagonist of the Golden Bat Kamishibai (paper theatre) series and it's various adaptations. He is Golden Bat's archenemy who wants to dominate the world and destroy all order and leads tens of thousands of subordinates by his side. Similar to his nemesis, who is also known for being considered Japan's eldest superhero, Nazō is considered by some to be the first supervillain in Japanese media and made some cameos in other media outside of the franchise and thus became an inspiration for countless other supervillains ever since.

Originally debuting in his own Kamishibai story he starred in, Black Bat was the villainous protagonist of his very own story depicted as a black-cloaked phantom thief committing robberies and was said to have been inspired by author Léon Sazie's Zigomar novel series which's movie adaptation was a huge hit in Japan during the Taishō era. It wouldn't be until the end of the story where, who would notably become the franchise's main protagonist, Golden Bat, appeared and defeated him. Since Golden Bat was more popular with children, Black Bat was redesigned and renamed as the series' main villain he is better known as to this day as "Dr. Nazō" with Golden Bat taking the latter's place as the titular protagonist in the series ever since.

Since his debut of the new series starring the new titular character in 1931, Nazo wears a black costume and mask with bat-like ears (similar to Batman's), a red eye and a blue eye. Nazo's portrayal or design has varied in various other later forms of the franchise's adaptations; the Toei version of the character (played by Kouji Sekiyama) also created for the anime version has an updated look of having four eyes being red, blue, green and yellow and has a mechanical claw on his left hand. In both aforementioned versions, his empire consists of a drill-shaped tower shape known as "Nazō Tower" and in the anime version (voiced by Ushio Shima), he also has a lituenant who goes under the name of Mazō. Nazo has also commonly been depicted as a Nazi remnant in both the post-war Kamishibai version of Golden Bat and the anime adaptation.
