= Chase the Express =

2000 video game

- Japanese cover art
- Developer: TYO Entertainment (Note: Produced by Sugar & Rockets. Additional work by Sony Computer Entertainment Japan.)
- Publisher: Sony Computer Entertainment: NA: Activision
- Designers: Makoto Chiba; Issei Oda
- Programmer: Isamu Hamada
- Composer: Toshiyuki Watanabe
- Platform: PlayStation
- Release: JP: January 27, 2000; NA: June 14, 2000; EU: September 8, 2000
- Genre: Third-person shooter
- Mode: Single-player

Chase the Express (Note: Japanese: チェイス・ザ・エクスプレス, Hepburn: Cheisu Za Ekusupuresu), known in North America as Covert Ops: Nuclear Dawn, is a 2000 third-person shooter video game developed by TYO Entertainment and published by Sony Computer Entertainment for the PlayStation. The game focuses on players taking on the role of a NATO officer tasked with rescuing hostages aboard an armored train and defeating a terrorist group who threatens to use nuclear weapons to devastate Europe.

The game's design included puzzle elements, action combat, stealth, and level designs, similar to the Resident Evil and Metal Gear Solid series, with branching scenario paths and multiple endings. The game received mixed reviews from critics, receiving praise for its graphics, but criticism over its gameplay and design.

== Gameplay ==
Chase the Express is a played from a third person perspective, with fixed cameras that focus on the player camera spread across each explorable area in the game. The main focus is to explore an armoured train, visiting each car, searching for useful objects, while dealing with hostile enemies - with the game borrowing notable elements from both Resident Evil and Metal Gear Solid.

Combat focuses mainly on the use of firearms that the player can find during the course of a playthrough, with additional ammo either found in a level or dropped randomly by some enemies, with each weapon featuring parts that can be used to improve them. Alongside weapons, enemies can be engaged in hand-to-hand combat, though players can opt to use stealth to avoid combat and get around enemies; enemies become alarmed if they should spot the player, until they either evade or eliminate pursuers. Any damage from enemies can be treated by finding and using first aid kits.

Alongside combat, players will need to find items and keys in order to access new carriages and solve puzzles. Documents can also be found, providing background information on the story or useful hints for solving puzzles. In certain areas, players can find boxes where items not required can be stored, and from where the game can be saved. The game's story is not completely linear, as the player can make choices at key moments that can determine what they experience later in their playthrough and which ending they achieve.

== Plot ==
Following a visit to St. Petersburg, French ambassador Pierre Simon makes his return to Paris aboard a NATO armored train called "The Blue Harvest", accompanied by his wife Catherine, their daughter Jane, and Simon's secretary, Philip Mason, are guarded by a NATO team led by Lieutenant Jack Morton. Shortly after the train nears the borders of Ukraine, a terrorist group known as the "Knights of the Apocalypse," led by ex-KGB agent Boris Zugoski, attacks the NATO team and boards the train. Boris reveals his intentions to ransom Simon and his family for $20 billion from NATO along with safe passage into France. Jack, the only survivor in the NATO team, finds himself placed under the command of a United Nations counter-terrorist agency, who instruct him to rescue the ambassador and his family as well as dealing with the terrorists.

Gaining access to the interior of the train, he manages to rescue Pierre and Mason, with the ambassador asking him to find Catherine and Jane. Searching for them, Morton encounters Christina Wayborn, the only surviving member of the ambassador's protective detail, who works alongside him, and Sgt. Billy MacGuire, a grievously wounded soldier. After rescuing the ambassador's family, a rescue team arrives and recovers them from the train. Furious, Boris attempts to retaliate with missiles on several European countries, forcing Jack to prevent their launch. Boris soon contacts the UN directly, reiterating his demands; the agency subsequently aborts a second rescue attempt for the ambassador. Jack is informed of this, with the agency commander revealing that Boris brought along several nuclear warheads aboard the train.

Reconvening with Christina, Mason and Billy, Jack decides to search the train for Boris and rescue the ambassador, who disappeared during the earlier chaos. During his search, he comes across a piece of hardware known as an IC Chip, but has little knowledge on what it does. After rescuing Christina from a trap, Jack confronts Boris in the rear of the train. He soon becomes confused when Boris demands not only the IC Chip, but Pierre, having assumed the terrorists had him. Jack is forced to fight Boris and kill him; Billy, if he is treated for his wounds before this, is shot before the fight, only surviving if players ensure he was given Jack's bulletproof vest.

Following the fight, Jack discovers Mason is a double agent, sent to steal a data disk and the IC Chip from the Blue Harvest, and who was responsible for helping Boris capture the train. After handing over the IC Chip to Morton in an attempt to rescue Christina once more, Jack finds himself contacted by Pierre, who takes him to the VIP lounge on the train. There he reveals a safe containing the disc Morton requested, alongside a fake. Heading to the last car on the train, Jack confronts Morton, who reveals the disk contains the blueprints for creating a hydrogen engine - the same kind used by the Blue Harvest, which supplies it with almost limitless power - which he intends to use to make himself rich. Regardless of which disc he is given, Morton attempts to get rid of Jack and Christina, before escaping by helicopter.

Upon regrouping, Jack learns the terrorists have wired six nuclear warheads into the Blue Harvest's engine, and is tasked with defusing them before it gets too close to Paris, forcing the NATO council to remotely destroy the train to prevent a nuclear disaster. Although he succeeds to defuse them all, Christina soon discover the train has been rewired to function like a nuclear missile, prompting Jack to detach the front car of the train from the rest of the express, so as to defuse the final bomb; if the fake disc was handed over, Jack is forced to deal with Mason and kill him. The game ends with Jack reuniting Pierre with his family, with the crisis now over.

== Cast ==
Character	Actor
Jack Morton	Avi Landau
Christina Wayborn	Colleen Lanki
Boris Zugoski	Dean Harrington
Pierce Simon	Mike Worman
Phillip Mason	Jeff Manning
Billy MacGuire	David Schaufele
Anderson	William Ross

== Reception ==
Reception

Aggregate score
Aggregator	Score
GameRankings	63%

Review scores
Publication	Score
AllGame	1.5/5
Edge	3/10
Electronic Gaming Monthly	6.33/10 (Note: Three critics of Electronic Gaming Monthly gave the game each a score of 7.5/10, 6.5/10, and 5/10.)
EP Daily	3.5/10
Famitsu	30/40
Game Informer	7.75/10
GameFan	(US) 59% (JP) 44%
GameRevolution	C
GameSpot	5.3/10
IGN	4.8/10
Next Generation	2/5
Official U.S. PlayStation Magazine	2.5/5

The game received "mixed" reviews according to the review aggregation website GameRankings. IGN criticized its gameplay for bad controls and game design despite praising the graphics and stating that the game had "detailed environments and solid player models". Daniel Erickson of NextGen called it "A good weekend rental with nice graphics but nothing to really sink your teeth into." In Japan, Famitsu gave it a score of 30 out of 40. Uncle Dust of GamePro concluded, "Twitch-oriented gamers should pass on this rather sluggish thriller." (Note: GamePro gave the game three 3.5/5 scores for graphics, control, and fun factor, and 4/5 for sound.)
