= Imai Yone =

Japanese Christian street theater artist (1897–1968)

- よね 今井
- Imai Yone performing in Tokyo, 1933.
- Born: 1897; Mie Prefecture, Japan
- Died: 1968 (aged 70–71); Tokyo, Japan
- Education: Ochanomizu University; University of California
- Known for: Kamishibai

Imai Yone (今井よね, Yone Imai; 1897 – 1968) was a Japanese Christian missionary and educator who became a pioneer of kamishibai performance in the 1930s.

== Biography ==
Imai Yone was born in 1897 in Mie Prefecture of Japan. She traveled to Tokyo for secondary school in 1917, and was baptized in the Christian faith the next year when she was 21. She soon graduated from Tōkyō Joshi Kōtō Shihan Gakkō, or Tokyo Women's Normal School, now known as Ochanomizu University. Following the 1923 Great Kantō earthquake, she met Christian social activist Toyohiko Kagawa and joined the earthquake relief efforts he was organizing from Tokyo. In 1926, she accompanied him to Osaka and led the efforts to open the Friends of Jesus Nursing Mission, or Furenzu obu jīzasu kango misshon.

Yone traveled to the United States to study theology at the University of California and work as a missionary for several years beginning in 1927. She returned to Japan sometime before 1931, as that is when she singlehandedly opened a Christian mission and Sunday school to offer classes that were regularly attended by approximately fifty local children. Shortly after, she began a decades long career creating stories for religious street theatre performances intended for children. Her publications most often featured stories and characters from the Bible's Old Testament like Moses, Noah, and David.

Imai Yone died in 1968 in Tokyo, after dedicating much of her life to kamishibai and the catechesis of Japanese children.

== Kamishibai ==
Kamishibai or "paper performance" is a form of uniquely Japanese street theatre that gained popularity in the interwar period of the 1930s, thanks in large part to the work of Imai Yone. A performer of gaito kamishibai ("street-corner kamishibai") would travel the country carrying a box that was roughly the size of a small television on the back of their bicycle, setting up along city streets to entertain local children who were often accompanied by their adult family members. The box typically featured decorations that made it look like a small theatre, and a rotating selection of illustrated slides were slid in and out of a large viewing window in sequence. The front of the slides featured illustrated paintings of different scenes and the back featured the text script for the performer to follow, eliminating the need for memorization and allowing performers to carry many stories at one time. The slides were supplemented with the narrator's expressive performance, songs, puppets, and props, providing audiences with an experience that combined engaging performance with storytelling and art in a way that echoes modern children's television programming.

An estimated 2,500 people performed ten times day on the streets of Tokyo in 1933, for an audience total of nearly one million children a day. During the height of the postwar period, approximately five million people watched a kamishibai show somewhere in Japan every day. Traditional street-corner kamishibai eventually went out of style in the 1960s following the popularization of television, originally known as denki kamishibai or "electric kamishibai". Even though street kamishibai has long become unpopular, Imai Yone's invention of educational kamishibai still maintains a stronghold on Japanese children's entertainment.

=== Education ===
Imai Yone became the first person to experiment with kamishibai as a tool for educating children sometime around 1931. After noticing a sharp decrease in attendance at her Sunday school lessons, Yone followed the local children to a performance and immediately recognized the value such an art form could provide to her proselytizing efforts. She soon began the first iteration of what is now known as Fukuin Kamishibai, or Gospel Kamishibai. When she was later asked about her intentions behind creating a biblical theater performance, Imai offered the following simple explanation:

On a Sunday, the regulars did not come to Sunday school, except for five or six children. Even those who came were impatient and asked, 'Sensei! A kamishibai is coming. I would love to see it. Can I go? I will come back after kamishibai is over.' I lost all my children to kamishibai!

Yone's idea to combine education with the performance of kamishibai was incredibly successful, and immediately drew crowds of eager children. This was the beginning of pedagogic kamishibai, or kyouiku Kamishibai. In encouraging others to create educational kamishibai, Imai pointed to the extreme ease of access afforded by the art form. The performances could be carried out on the street by anyone capable of reading the illustrated cards, which could be made with cheap materials that were light enough to be carried for any length of time by nearly anyone.

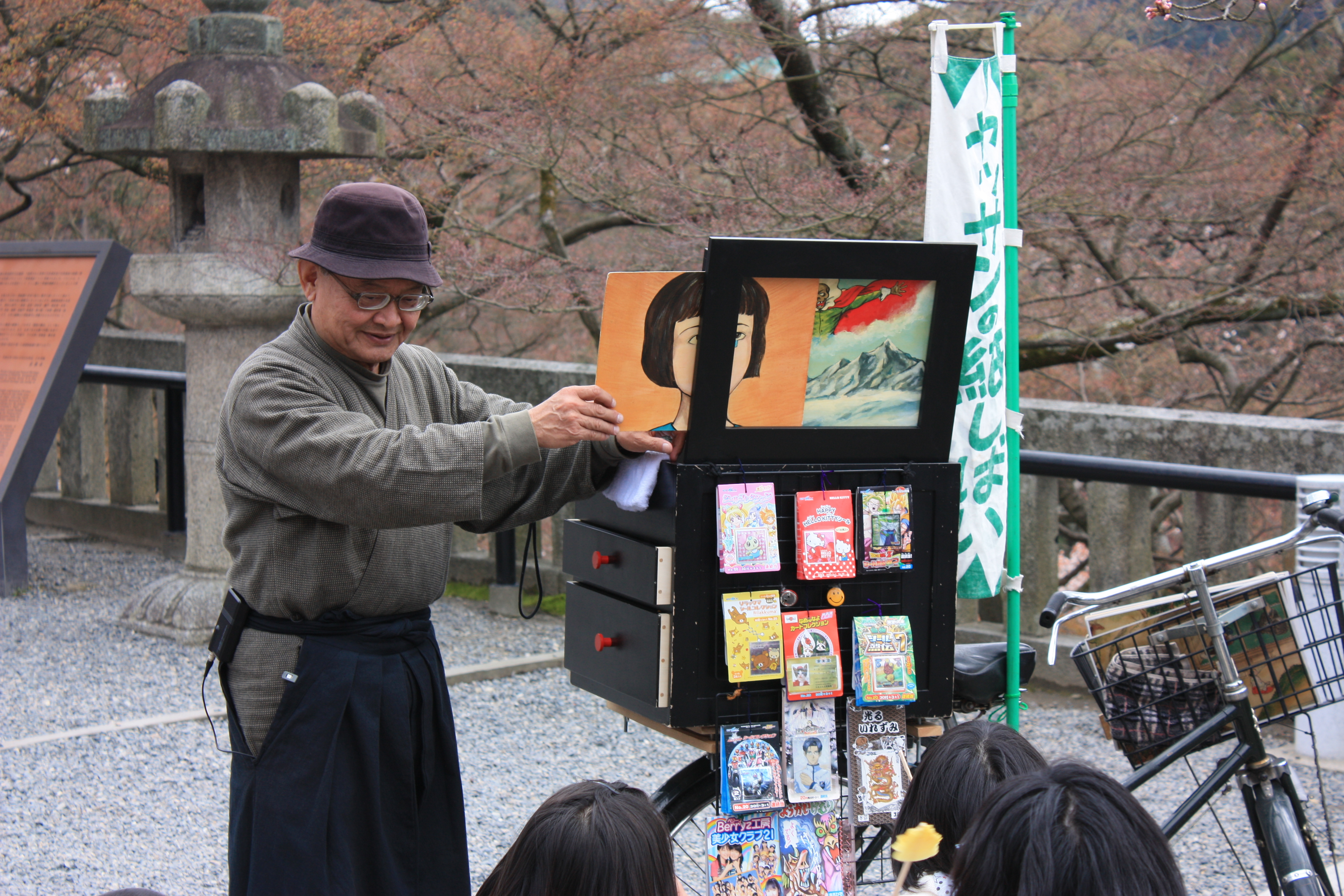
Kamishibai performer at Kiyomizu-dera in 2009.

=== Innovations ===
Imai Yone's impacts on the creation of kamishibai have led to numerous scholars referring to her as the "Johannes Gutenberg of Japanese educational kamishibai." The majority of kashimibai performers purchased pre-made slides from professional publishers, but Imai Yone employed artists to illustrate scripts that she wrote, and she often joined other performers in sharing stories of her own creation. In 1933, she organized a group of performers called the Kamishibiai Missionaries, or kamishibai dendō dan. While contemporary articles from publications like Tokyo's Asahi Shimbun spoke negatively about street-corner kamishibai, indicating it was a poor man's art, Imai Yone argued that exact point was one of its strengths. She agreed that it was not an art form for the elites of society, instead it was art for the lower classes (particularly children) and urban poor, who were typically uncomfortable with or suspicious of traditional educational settings. Yone argued that kamishibai was the perfect art for persuading viewers, as "the hearts of the performer and the viewers are unified" during the performance.

Before Imai Yone entered the scene, kamishibai performances featured 5 x 7 inch (12.7 x 17.8 cm) illustration slides. She quickly doubled the standard size to 10.5 x 15 inches (26.7 x 38 cm), dramatically increasing the maximum number of people that could view a single performance at once. Previous kamishibai performers typically required children to purchase candy before allowing them to view the performance, but Imai Yone offered her stories for free. She also doubled the length of a typical show from ten slides to twenty, encouraging people of all ages and backgrounds to listen to her kamishibai performances.

Imai Yone was the first person to use lithography to expedite the creation of kamishibai plays, drastically decreasing both the production cost and the cost to the customer in the process. Artists employed by Yone were instructed to outline their illustrations with dark, thick lines so children seated far away from the images could still see them.

She even created kamishibai in the format of printed journals so they could be easily transported to rural areas and cheaply cut and pasted onto cardboard to create the typical slides. Upon seeing the success of cinema and radio, Imai also pioneered the production of kamishibai voice recordings in the late 1930s. Intended to be available at an affordable rate for consumers, the recordings of traditional kamishibai plays were often performed by famous Japanese cinema actors.

=== Publishing ===
In 1933, Imai Yone established a publishing house called Kamishibai Kankokai to produce her own stories on a larger scale. She immediately started hiring many artists to increase both the quantity and the quality of kamishibiai she was able to manufacture. Initially, kamishibai performers could rent particular sets of slides from Yone, who in turn was able to reduce costs by rotating the same stories between different performers across the city. Once the slides were made available for regular purchase by storytellers, a set of twenty could be acquired for less than three yen. At the time, most Japanese printed media far exceeded the literacy level of children and a radio could cost upwards of a month's wages, so the availability of kamishibai at such a low cost was revolutionary for the dissemination of media and ideas.

By pioneering the use of lithography in the kamishibai publishing process, Imai was able to introduce insatsu kamishibiai (printed kamishibai) to general stores at a low cost. This provided average parents and educators with the opportunity to affordably purchase the plays for community performances in their homes, schools, or churches. She even produced insatsu kamishibai stories that were printed in black and white, specifically intended to be colored at home by children.

In 1933, she published the book Fukuin Kamishibai (Kamishibai gospel), which advocated for the expansion of the use of theater in children's religious education. She published a larger book that served as a broader evaluation of the state of kamishibai in missionary work and art in 1934, titled Kamishibai no jissai (The Reality of Kamishibai). Several years later, she published at least nine kamishibai volumes of New Testament biblical stories titled The Life of Jesus. Yone's production facility became the official publishing house of the Tokyo branch of the Young Mens Christian Association in 1935.

Throughout the 1930s, Imai Yone published more than fifty kamishibai plays. She retired from kamishibai production following the end of World War II. The following is an incomplete list of Bible stories known to have been published and translated to kamishibai plays by Imai Yone:

- Damasuko tojō no Pauro (Paul on his way to Damascus), artist Yasuo Itakura, 1933.
- Shishiana no Danieru (Daniel in the Lion's Den), artist Yasuo Itakura, 1933.
- Kurisumasu monogatari (The Christmas Story), artist Yasuo Itakura, 1933.
- Aburahamu: Seisho monogatari (Abraham: Tales from the Bible), artist Hiroshi Miura, 1934.
- Kuwa no ki no Zaakai: Seisho monogatari (Zacchaeus of the Sycamore Tree), artist Hiroshi Miura, 1934.
- Yona monogatari (The Tale of Jonah), artist Hiroshi Miura, 1934.
- Yōji Mōse monogatari (Tale of Baby Moses), artist Yuzuki Kaoru, 1934.
- Yosefu: Seisho monogatari (Joseph: Tales from the Bible), artist Hiroshi Miura, 1934.
- Kami no hito Mōze (Moses, the man of God), artist Toshio Saito, 1939.
- Mōze: Kōkai o wataru (Moses: Crossing the Red Sea), artist Toshio Saito, 1939.
- Noa no kōzui (Noah's Flood), artist Hirasawa Sadaharu, 1939.
- Tane maki no hanashi (The Parable of the Sower), artist unknown, 1939.

=== Propaganda ===
As Imperial Japan was preparing for war in the 1930s, the government saw the potential of kamishibai as a propaganda tool. It was far cheaper and more accessible to produce kamishibai slides than it was to record and distribute films or radio broadcasts, which led to a record number of government sanctioned kamishibai performances.

The Nippon Gageki Kyoiku Kyokai (Japan Kamishibai Education Association; or NGKK) was established in 1932, in part to monitor the subject matter of kamishibai plays. The NGKK began threatening and intimidating specific educational publishing houses into promoting a pro-war agenda in July 1937, including those belonging to Imai Yone, Buddhist educator Takahasi Gozan, and artist Matsunaga Ken'ya. Though Imai Yone expressed some communist and socialist views prior to the late 1930s, her true politics are unknown. Many openly Christian individuals experienced additional harassment under Japan's Peace Preservation Law, so it is likely her that her sudden willingness to contribute propaganda was connected to extreme societal pressure to avoid potential persecution or incarceration.

Yone began producing mundane, public interest kamishibai plays with themes like traffic safety and general hygiene for the government in the mid 1930s, eventually moving to plays with more explicitly militaristic and totalitarian messages. The Nippon Shokokumin Bukna Kyokai (National Association for Young Citizens' Culture) was established by the Imperial Rule Assistance Association in November 1940 to encourage young people to join the war effort. Imai Yone was involved with the organization's kashimibai group, one of several people responsible for leading the creation of kokusaku kashimibai, or "national policy" kashimbai. The group's kashimibai became so ubiquitous that censorship was no longer required, because the government was producing and distributing every play on the market. Young women were conscripted for the war effort to both assist in the creation of kashimibai and to travel the countryside performing the propaganda plays for as many Japanese citizens as possible. The following is a small selection of known propaganda kashimibai created by Imai Yone:

- Ginō Sakubee, artist Kaseki Kyōgoku, 1941.
- Naman Shogun (General Naman of Ancient Syria), artist Kaseki Kyōgoku, 1941.

== Legacy ==
Imai Yone's work in kamishibai directly influenced numerous others in her field, including Takahashi Gozan, Uchiyama Kenshō, Matsunaga Ken’ya, and Saki Akio.

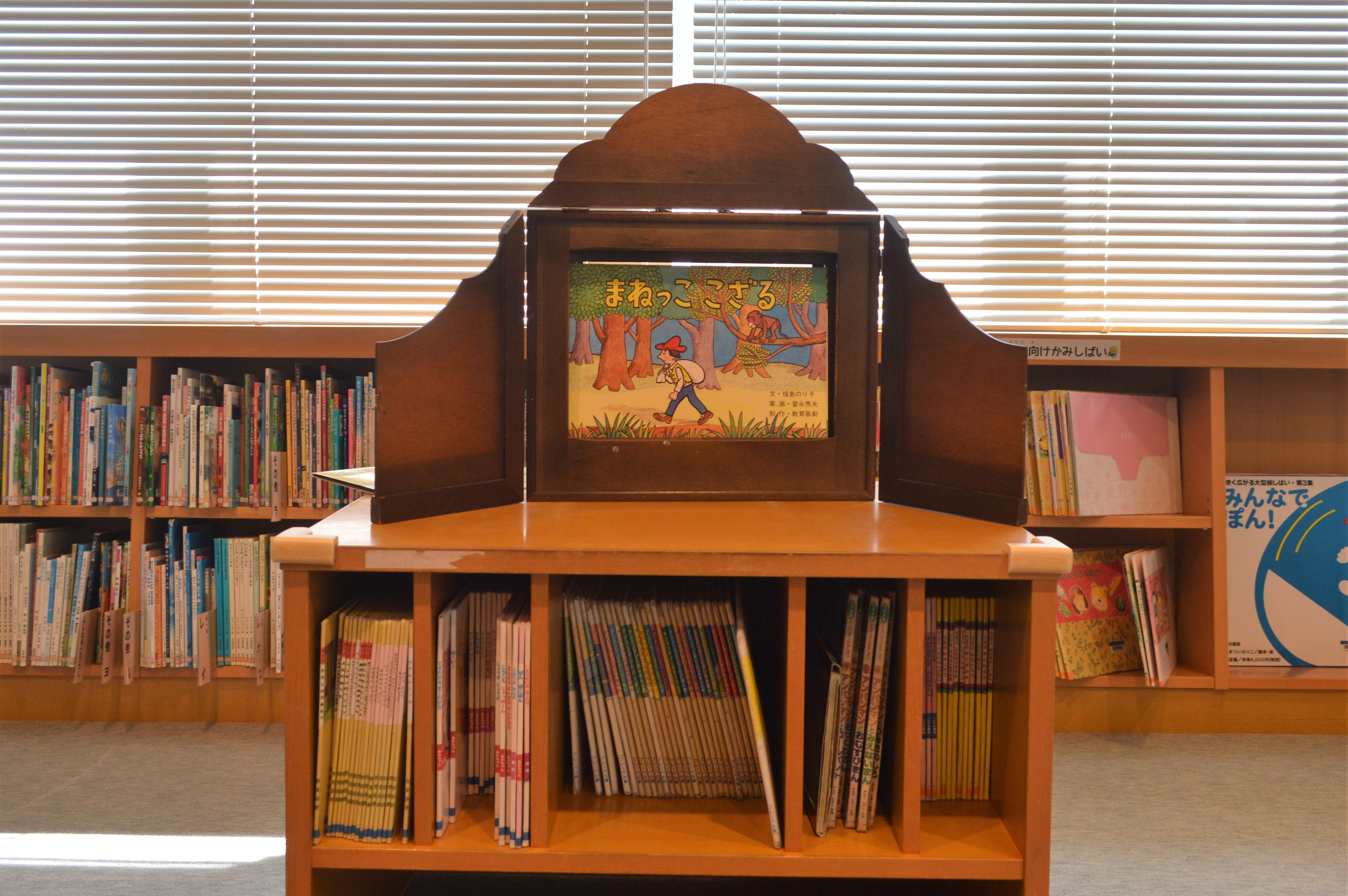
Modern educational kamisibai, staged at Tokamachi's public library, 2018.

For several decades beginning in the 1930s until 1967, kyouiku kamishibai was listed as one of the most important activities for children in the Ministry of Education's Pedagogic Guidelines for Kindergarten. Educational kamishibai are still performed for children across Japan, but they are now typically reserved for preschool and kindergarten level students. As of 2022, educational kamishibai performances are additionally still commonly staged at libraries, nursing homes, and festivals for audiences of all ages.

=== Collections ===
A 2012 short film titled Die for Japan: Wartime Propaganda Kamishibai directed by Jeffrey Dym, professor of history at California State University, Sacramento, explored Japan's use of kamishibai and highlighted the innovations pioneered by Imai Yone. An archived copy of the film can be viewed here. Few known copies of Yone's kamishibai illustrated plays still remain, though Cotsen Children's Library at Princeton University in New Jersey counts over a dozen examples of her work amongst their collections. Several of her works and original books are also held by the Hoover Institution Library and Archives at Stanford University in California.
