= Lanny Broyles =

American actor

- Born: Lanny Marshall Broyles; February 25, 1949 (age 76); Riverside, California, U.S.
- Occupations: Voice actor; choreographer
- Years active: 1970s-1990s

Lanny Marshall Broyles (born February 25, 1949) is a Tokyo-based American voice actor and choreographer.

== Career ==
A graduate of the University of Southern California with a major in "Speech", "Theater" and "English Literature", Broyles appeared in supporting roles in various early 1980s films; most notably Roger Corman's Battle Beyond the Stars.

Wishing to live in a foreign country, Broyles moved to Japan in the 1980s, where he did dubbing work for Frontier Enterprises. He currently works as an English-teacher at the Waseda College of International Language Vocational School.

== Filmography ==
=== Dubbing ===
==== Anime films ====
- Cyborg 009: The Legend of the Super Galaxy (1980) – Commander Garro
- Arcadia of My Youth (1982) – Captain Harlock, Phantom F. Harlock I
- The Dagger of Kamui (1985) – Genjuro Fujibayashi

=== Video games ===
- Ys III: Wanderers from Ys (1991) – Jetai
