= Frontier Enterprises =

Japanese dubbing company

- Native name: フロンティア・エンタープライズ
- Industry: Dubbing; Translation
- Founded: 1964
- Founder: William Ross
- Defunct: 2000
- Fate: Closed
- Headquarters: 39-3 Nishihara, Shibuya, Tokyo, Japan

Frontier Enterprises (フロンティア・エンタープライズ) was a Tokyo-based company dedicated to the dubbing of Japanese films and media for the English language. Frontier did jobs for Toho International, Toei Animation and Shochiku Company, dubbing their films into English for export.

Along with New York's Titra Studios, Rome's Associated Recording Artists, and Hong Kong's Axis and Omni Productions, Frontier was one of the early pioneers in English-language dubbing.

== History ==
Frontier Enterprises was founded in 1964 by Cincinnati-born Korean War veteran William Ross, whose initial postwar plans were to join the Japanese State Department but instead became involved with the Japanese film industry. He became involved in the dubbing industry in 1959, upon recommendation by Japanese actor So Yamamura. He showed such a talent for the industry, that the Japanese dubbing director left Ross in charge on the first day.

As the other Tokyo-based dubbing companies began to fold, Ross decided to found Frontier Enterprises, which soon began working for all the major studios, having dubbed over 500 live-action and animated films and TV shows. Ross worked as dialogue writer, dubbing director and voice actor, with his wife doing most translations for the English scripts.

Instead of using professional talent, Ross was forced to rely on whatever native English speakers he could find in Tokyo. Businessmen, students, musicians, anyone, regardless of acting experience were eligible to provide their voices to Frontier dubs. Even so, Ross would hold auditions, making sure to hire the best people available, and trained them thoroughly before recording sessions.

Frontier is possibly best known for dubbing some of the early Godzilla films such as Ebirah, Horror of the Deep (later known as Godzilla vs. the Sea Monster), Son of Godzilla, and Destroy All Monsters. However, for reasons unclear, American International Pictures would produce their own dubs for these movies (dubbed by Titra Studios in New York) likely due to them not finding the Frontier dubs of good enough quality. As a result, fans will typically refer to the Frontier dubs as the "International dubs" as these would often appear in the United Kingdom and other English-speaking European countries. The Frontier dubs have often appeared on recent DVD and Blu-Ray releases as well.

In the 1970s, Toho moved to Hong Kong's Axis International and Omni Productions for English-dubbed Godzilla films. The reason for this is unclear, though Toho would go on to commission Frontier to dub The Mystery of Mamo for JAL flights. With this, Frontier began to largely move into Japanese animated films in the late 70s and throughout the 1980s. These films would mostly be released on VHS by Celebrity Home Entertainment under their "Just for Kids" label throughout the 80s.

By the 1990s, Frontier began to move into voice acting for video games which is where it would mostly focus until Ross retired and the company closed in 2000.

== Dubbed works ==
=== Television series ===
- The Samurai (1962–1965)
- Phantom Agents (1964–1966)

=== Films ===
- The Hidden Fortress (1958)
- Yojimbo (1961)
- Sanjuro (1962)
- The Last War (1961)
- The Lost World of Sinbad (1963)
- Attack Squadron (1963)
- Ebirah, Horror of the Deep (1966)
- The War of the Gargantuas (1966)
- Gappa: The Triphibian Monster (1967)
- The Killing Bottle (1967)
- Son of Godzilla (1967)
- Booted Babe, Busted Boss (1968)
- Destroy All Monsters (1968)
- Battle of the Japan Sea (1969)
- The Bullet Train (1975)
- Legend of Dinosaurs & Monster Birds (1977)
- Princess from the Moon (1987)

=== Anime ===
==== Series ====
- Phantaman (1967–1968)
- Choppy & the Princess (1967–1968)

==== Films ====
- The Little Prince & the Eight-Headed Dragon (1963)
- The Mystery of Mamo (1978)
- Cyborg 009: The Legend of the Super Galaxy (1980)
- Voltus 5 (1980) (compilation film)
- Space Warrior Baldios (1981)
- Swan Lake (1981)
- Aladdin & the Wonderful Lamp (1982)
- Arcadia of My Youth (1982)
- The Dagger of Kamui (1985)

=== Video games ===
- Ys III: Wanderers from Ys (1989)
- Dynasty Warriors 2 (2000)
- WinBack: Covert Operations (2000)

== Voice actors ==
Voice actors commonly utilized in Frontier's dubs:

- Jasmine Ann Allen
- Lanny Broyles
- Bill Calhoun
- Walter Carroll
- Tom Clark
- Nanny Cullucci
- Debora Davidson
- Jerry Davidson
- Deborah DeSnoo
- Robert Dunham (†)
- Ken Frankel
- Barry Gjerde
- Tracy Gleason
- Will Gluck
- Peter von Gomm
- Lenne Hardt
- Cliff Harrington (†)
- Dean Harrington
- Michelle Hart
- Ruth Hollyman
- Don Johnson
- James Keating
- Eric Kelso
- Don Knode (†)
- Steve Knode
- Patricia Kobayashi
- Avi Landau
- Nancy Link
- Clay Lowrey
- Paul Lucas
- Mary Malone
- Jeff Manning
- Jack Marquardt
- Corey Marshall
- Lindsay Martell
- Leighton McClure
- Scott McCulloch (†)
- Jim McGill
- Brian Michel
- Burr Middleton
- Didi Moore
- Michael Naishtut
- Richard Nieskens
- Brian Pardus
- Sam Peterson
- Don Pomes
- Frank Rogers
- William Ross (†)
- Judith Sackheim
- Maya Sackheim
- Carrie Sakai
- Akasha Scholen
- Adam Simons
- Justine Simons
- Gerri Sorrells
- Greg Starr
- Rumiko Varnes
- Bud Widom (†)
- Dick Wieand
- Lisle Wilkerson
- Craig Williams
- Toby Williams
- Mike Worman
- Carole Wyand
- Donna Zucatti
- Joseph Zucatti
- Dan Coughlin

† deceased
