= Arcadia of My Youth =

1982 film by Tomoharu Katsumata

- Theatrical poster

Japanese name
- Kanji: わが青春のアルカディア
Transcriptions
- Revised Hepburn: Waga Seishun no Arukadia
- Directed by: Tomoharu Katsumata
- Screenplay by: Yōichi Onaka
- Story by: Leiji Matsumoto
- Cinematography: Kenji Machida
- Edited by: Yutaka Chikura
- Music by: Toshiyuki Kimori
- Production company: Toei Animation
- Distributed by: Toei Company
- Release date: July 28, 1982
- Running time: 130 minutes
- Country: Japan
- Language: Japanese
- Box office: ¥650 million (rentals)

Arcadia of My Youth (わが青春のアルカディア, Waga Seishun no Arukadia) is an anime feature film depicting the origin of seminal character Captain Harlock, created by Leiji Matsumoto. At one time, it was considered to be the central hub of the so-called "Leijiverse" with the events depicted in other works such as Galaxy Express 999 and Space Pirate Captain Harlock. The film was directed by Tomoharu Katsumata, with Kazuo Komatsubara as animation director.

== Plot ==
The movie opens with a quote often attributed to German author Goethe, from his book Italian Journey: "At the end of their lives, all men look back and think that their youth was Arcadia."

=== Prologue ===
Some time after World War I, aerial explorer Captain Phantom F. Harlock is embarking on what is to be the magnum opus of his long career: the traversing of the Owen Stanley Mountains in New Guinea. The mountain range is so dangerous to air travelers that many of them have described the winds around the mountain as if it were the evil laugh of a dreadful witch. In a last desperate attempt to cross the mountains, Harlock jettisons all but ten minutes of fuel in order to gain altitude. He carries on to his fate, amidst the mocking laughter of the Owen Stanley Witch.

=== The Deathshadow arrives ===
At some time in the late 30th century (circa 2960s), a Solar Federation military officer named Captain Phantom F. Harlock returns home in his battle cruiser Deathshadow. Earth has succumbed to the invaders from planet Illumidus, who were helped by another alien race, the Tokargans. The ship carrying refugees from the Illumidus-Earth war crash into the airfield and is rendered useless. A Tokargan official takes over the ship and Harlock's gun, and orders him to present himself to the local Illumidus officer in two hours. Harlock uses this time to search for his lover: a mysterious woman who transmits messages of hope to the people of occupied Earth. They call her The Voice of Free Arcadia.

During a bar fight, Harlock meets a street beggar who hides a Solar Federation uniform under his rags, working under a civilian engineering force. He is Tochiro Ōyama, a Japanese man whom Harlock has never met before, but feels that he knows somehow. After a fight with the Tokargan police they are taken into a Illumidus laboratory where a special machine analyzes their DNA and finds out that they have something in common. A flashback begins that explains this uncanny relation.

=== World War II ===
Near the end of World War II, fighter pilot Phantom F. Harlock II is an Iron Cross-wearing German who flies a Messerschmitt Bf 109. The war is about to end and Germany is losing. After his plane crashes, Harlock II meets the refugee Toshiro Ōyama, a Japanese engineer working in Germany. His dream project is to design a new gun sight for use in fighter planes. Harlock's most treasured possession is the Revi C-12D gun sight which he calls his "eye". Despite being members of Axis forces, both believe this war to be wasteful and pointless. Toshiro hopes that the rockets developed by Germany may one day lead to a more positive applications, such as traveling to the moon.

As the Allied forces approach, Harlock gets a working airplane and hides Toshiro inside of the fuselage. He wishes to fly the refugee over the border of neutral Switzerland where he might be able to fulfill his dreams. A fierce aerial dogfight ensues, and Harlock feels that the elevator pedal stopped working. Toshiro yells from inside the plane that he should try again, and it works. Harlock crashes the plane into a river, which is the border of Switzerland. When he opens the fuselage, he discovers that Toshiro fixed the broken elevator cable with his own body, tying one side on his leg and holding the other side of the cable with his bloodied wrists, making it possible for Harlock to keep flying. Harlock gives Toshiro his beloved Revi C-12D gunsight and carries him across the river. Hearing the sound of French Resistance members approaching to catch him, Harlock leaves Toshiro and walks back to fulfill his destiny and be punished for his actions. Toshiro pledges a friendship among men between their two bloodlines for all of eternity.

=== Rebel ships ===
Back in the distant future, Harlock and Tochiro continue to survive the occupation. Harlock tries to find his lover once again, knowing that the Tökargan cops have been ordered by the Illumidus office to find her and silence the pirate radio station. Meanwhile, Tochiro finds the pirate queen Emeraldas, and helps her fix her spaceship.

Harlock finds Maya just in time to save her from the police. In the ensuing shootout, he is shot in the face, and loses an eye. Maya begs him to leave her alone or else the police will kill Harlock. He tries to reach her, but passes out. Harlock then reaches Emeraldas and Tochiro for help. They start thinking about using her ship to fight the occupation, but Emeraldas prefers to remain neutral so that she won't lose her merchant license.

The discussion is interrupted by the Tokargans from the beginning of the movie. They want to steal Emeraldas' ship to return to their country and rebel against the Illumidan occupation. The group discusses their options, where Tochiro reveals that he too has a captainless ship: he secretly spent the last few years building a new spaceship to fight the invaders. The name of the spaceship is ARCADIA, in honor of the eternal friendship forged between Phantom F. Harlock and Toshiro Ōyama 1,000 years before.

=== Rebellion strikes back ===
The earthling rebellion breaks out at the occupied airfield. Maya recovers from the bullet wound as her comrades fight the Illumidas under protection from Emeraldas' space airship. Tochiro takes his allies to the underground hideout where he's been keeping the Arcadia. Captain Harlock opens a suitcase that Maya had delivered, revealing a gigantic black pirate flag she had sewn, and also the iconic black uniform Harlock wears. The Arcadia lifts off and the battle against the occupation begins. A weak and ailing Maya drags herself out of the bedroom to witness the hopeful moment.

The Tokargans, after witnessing the death of the last female of their race, sacrifice themselves to save the Arcadia from the life sucking flames of the Flame Stream Prominence (aka the Owen Stanley Witch of Space). Harlock's lover and voice of the Underground, Maya is killed by Illumidas gunfire. After Harlock has honorably defeated the occupational commander in ship-to-ship combat, the quisling ruler of Earth, Triter, nonetheless declares both Harlock and Emeraldas outlaws and exiles them to space. Amidst an Earth that prefers servitude to their new masters over the hard but noble fight for freedom, Harlock, Emeraldas, Tochiro, and their new pirate crew of idealists and romantics set for the stars, heading out for parts unknown.

== Voice cast ==
Character name	Japanese voice actor	English voice actor
Captain Harlock/Phantom F. Harlock II	Makio Inoue	Lanny Broyles
Toshiro Ōyama/Tochirō	Kei Tomiyama	Walter Carroll
Queen Emeraldas	Reiko Tajima	Carrie Sakai
Maya	Reiko Mutō	Michelle Hart
La Mime	Yuriko Yamamoto	Gerri Sorrells
Zeda	Tarō Ishida	William Ross
Zoll	Shūichi Ikeda	Cliff Harrington
Muriguson	Takeshi Aono	Richard Nieskens as Murgison
Old Tokargan Soldier	Shūichirō Moriyama	Unknown
Triter	Hitoshi Takagi	Mike Worman
Tori-San	Hiroshi Ōtake	Didi Moore as Bird
Mira	Hiromi Tsuru	Justine Simons
The Witch	Eiko Masuyama	Unknown
Black-Suited Commander	Hidekatsu Shibata	Jeff Manning
Illumidus Officer	Kōji Yada	Unknown
Phantom F. Harlock I	Yujiro Ishihara	Unknown

== Production ==
The opening scenes of Arcadia of My Youth feature parts of The New World Symphony by Antonín Dvořák. This film starred acclaimed Japanese actor Yujiro Ishihara in his final role before his death in 1987. He was the voice of Phantom F. Harlock. It was also his only role in an animated film.

Arcadia of My Youth draws many parallels to the German occupation of France during World War II as well as the post-World War II American occupation of Japan. Maya's nickname as "The Rose" and the "Voice of Free Arcadia" mirrors the romantic image of the secret French Resistance radio broadcasters and of the Japanese propaganda machine featuring radio broadcasts by English speaking female announcers collectively known as "Tokyo Rose". These announcers relayed bad news from the home front. They also revealed Japanese intelligence about U.S. and Allied military activity by welcoming U.S. Navy submarines and ships by name and ID number to the theatre of operations. Allied crews listened intently during the broadcasts for mention of their units.

The prologue of this film does not make it clear whether or not Phantom F. Harlock survived his mission. He is assumed to have survived as his voiceover monologue indicates that he is reading from his autobiography which is titled "Arcadia of My Youth".

This film is controversial in that Phantom F. Harlock II was portrayed as a German fighter pilot during World War II. The Tochiro of that era, who had read Harlock I's book, at least found it unusual in that he asked Harlock II why he was flying an Iron Cross plane. The liner notes for the Animeigo DVD state that Harlock's response, "Just paying rent", hid a deeper meaning. It refers to the ancient feudal obligations a noble had to his lords for better or worse, even if he didn't believe in their cause. The liner notes also mention that Harlock technically was no longer bound by these obligations since the feudal customs no longer existed at that time.

There is much confusion as to where Arcadia, Harlock's birthplace is. It was always assumed to be somewhere in northern Europe, despite its naming after the rustic Greek paradise in the Peloponnesus. Harlock gives the proper name of his ancestral birthplace as Heiligenstadt, meaning that Arcadia is most likely a nickname. During the World War II segment of the film, Harlock II, while flying to Switzerland muses about Arcadia, leading viewers to assume that Arcadia was located there, but Harlock's cryptic comments about "paying rent" aside, this would still make little sense in the context of the film as Switzerland was neutral during World War II. Matsumoto never gave a concrete definitive statement on Harlock's ethnicity or heritage, but Harlock is an actual name of Prussian origin.

The stories of Phantom F. Harlock I and II are loosely based on short manga stories by Matsumoto. Many of them appeared in his manga anthology The Cockpit. Many elements of Arcadia of My Youth were borrowed from his other stories such as the Deathshadow which appeared in a 1970 manga and in his later adaptation of the original Space Battleship Yamato where the Deathshadow appears along with Susumu Kodai's brother whose alias is Captain Harlock. These elements did not make it into the anime version but they were the source of American fan rumors that the Leijiverse Harlock was actually Mamoru Kodai in disguise or possibly a descendant.

The origin story in the 1978 television series (episodes 30 and 31) depicts Harlock and Tochiro as childhood friends and Emeraldas meeting them both later. In Arcadia of My Youth, Emeraldas and Harlock are old friends while he is just meeting Tochiro. Furthermore, the 1978 TV series also shows the Arcadia (this time blue) being constructed on planet Heavy Meldar, not Earth. Also, Zoll of Tokarga, who made a guest appearance in episode 21 of that series, is totally reimagined for Arcadia of My Youth.

The fact that both of Captain Harlock's ancestors have the trademark Heidelberg duelling scar gives rise to the widespread fan assumption that the scar must be hereditary, though this is medically implausible. So far, no story has ever depicted how Harlock got his scars, though Arcadia of My Youth does depict Emeraldas receiving her scar from a glancing shot from the gun of Illumidas officer Muriguson. The four-episode Queen Emeraldas OVA series would re-invent her scar as a wound received during a sword duel with a different opponent.

The proper translation of the Japanese title is a source of dispute. Although Animeigo's "Arcadia of My Youth" has been widely accepted, the original "My Youth in Arcadia" was used in Japan and better reflects the inspiration from the Goethe quote.

Reportedly, character and concept creator Leiji Matsumoto owned an actual Revi C-12D gunsight that was used by the animators as visual reference when creating the one shown in the film.

== Home media ==
Arcadia of My Youth was originally released on North American home video by Celebrity Home Entertainment under the "Just For Kids" banner. It was initially retitled Vengeance of the Space Pirate, and was, for many, the first introduction to Captain Harlock. This release suffered from having about forty minutes cut out of it, most notably the lengthy pre-title prologue concerning one of Harlock's ancestor's attempt to fly over the tallest peak (known as the Stanley Witch) of the Owen Stanley Mountain Range in New Guinea (as "read" for inspiration by Harlock from said ancestor's autobiography, Arcadia of My Youth, moments before the Illumidas-attack on the Deathshadow). The film was later released by Best Film and Video along with many of the other anime released under the Just For Kids label. It was given the alternately translated title of "My Youth in Arcadia", and features all the cut footage restored. Another, more likely, possibility is that My Youth in Arcadia is the original version (on Best Film & Video's first issue, it was billed as "The original Vengeance of the Space Pirate"), probably an international dub, à la Toho's Super Spacefortress Macross version of the 1984 Macross film, Super Dimensional Fortress Macross: Do You Remember Love? (released here by Best Films & Video; their first issue was billed, "The original Clash of the Bionoids", referring to the edited Celebrity Just For Kids version).

A subtitled Laserdisc was released in North America by Animeigo on April 12, 1995.

Arcadia of My Youth was also released by Animeigo in 2003. It is the only Harlock story which shows how Harlock actually lost an eye (it also reveals how Emeraldas got her facial scar, making her a virtual distaff doppelganger of Harlock). One of the trailers for Arcadia of My Youth (one of two included as extras in Animeigo's DVD release) has one of the most confusing and misleading scenes, a clip of the Tokargan Zoll shooting out Harlock's eye. Zoll, in the film, is actually an enemy-turned-staunch-ally, and Harlock's injury is caused by Illumidas gunfire. This trailer scene was recreated for the boxes on the American VHS releases of Vengeance of the Space Pirate and My Youth in Arcadia.

Discotek Media released Arcadia of My Youth uncut on high-definition Blu-ray and DVD in North America on May 30, 2017.

== Origin and related works ==
The movie My Youth in Arcadia is mainly based on Leiji Matsumoto's illustrated novels Gun Frontier II, as well as other works of the artist:

- Gun Frontier II is a collection of three novels written and finely illustrated by Leiji Matsumoto in 1980. These works cover the events between the Battle of the Great Star Cluster (when Illumidas defeated the Solar System Federation and Harlock returned to Earth on the Deathshadow) and the departure of Harlock, Tochiro and Emeraldas from the Earth under Illumidas occupation. This timeline mostly corresponds to the first half of the movie, and some of its characters appear there as well (such as the Illumidas Occupation Forces Commander). Gun Frontier II's plot eventually diverges from the movie, focusing on the adventures of Harlock, Tochiro and Emeraldas that journey through the universe seeking freedom despite the Illumidas' menacing presence.

- Shinkirô Ferry Islander 0 is a 1982 manga by Leiji Matsumoto that takes place in the same universe and continuity of My Youth in Arcadia, also serving as a base for the film's backstory (in particular the Galaxy Destruction War between the Solar System Federation and the Illumidas Star Cluster). The manga revolves around Rei Yuki, the orphan of a Solar System veteran fallen during the Battle of the Great Star Cluster, and follows his struggle against the Illumidas Occupation Forces that oppress his world, and his journey to find freedom in the Sea of Stars, where Harlock also roams and fights the invaders.

- Leiji Matsumoto's Battlefield / Cockpit manga is the base of the two flashback scenes in the movie My Youth in Arcadia. The one involving Phantom Harlock I's and the Stanley Witch derives from Matsumoto's short story The Stanley Witch, while the flashback showing the meeting of Phantom Harlock II and Tochiro stems from Matsumoto's short story My Youth in Arcadia.

- Matsumoto's Queen Emeraldas manga is the base of the Great Flames River and the Space Witch that feeds on living energy in the movie My Youth in Arcadia.

== Legacy ==
=== Sequel TV series ===
The fight against the Illumidas is continued in the 1982–1983 TV series Endless Orbit SSX. This series suffered low viewer ratings, as it aired during the waning years of the Matsumoto-boom that started in the 1970s with Space Battleship Yamato. By this time, Japanese audiences' interest had moved on to the trend in mecha shows that began after Macross and Mobile Suit Gundam. The Matsumoto-boom would completely die off by 1983 with the release of the theatrical film Final Yamato, and aside from a few isolated one-off projects, no new regularly produced anime based on Matsumoto works would be released until 1998. Discotek Media licensed Endless Road SSX for North American territories, and was officially released in English in 2017.

=== Comic adaptation ===
The American comic book company Eternity Comics published an original comic series based on Captain Harlock. It theoretically picked up where Arcadia of My Youth left off, and was also written in an attempt to bridge the storylines of Galaxy Express 999 and 1978's Space Pirate Captain Harlock TV series. The comic also featured several significant story-arcs titled "Deathshadow Rising", "Fall of the Empire", and "The Machine Men", which would theoretically lead into the Galaxy Express 999 stories. The comic series ran from 1989 to 1992, and was scripted by Robert W. Gibson, and drawn by Ben Dunn and Tim Eldred.
