= Ushio Shima =

Japanese voice actor

Ushio Shima (島宇志夫, Shima Ushio) (June 20, 1931 – before 1990) was a Japanese actor and voice actor.

== Credits ==
=== Anime ===
- Dragon Suikoden (Blackbeard)
- Ogon Bat (Lord Nazo)
- Goku's Great Adventure (King of the Monsters)
- Kaibutsu-kun
- Sabu and Ichi's Detective Records (Juzo)
- Kamui Gaiden (Gohei)
- Animentalie Decision
- Lupin the Third (1977)
- Mazinger Z
- Isamu, the boy of the wilderness (Katsunoshin Watari)
- Paul's Miracle Mission (Ice Demon King)
- Science Ninja Team Gatchaman F (Dr. Doll, Count Egobossler)
- Poem of a Baseball Fanatic (Zenigata)
- Doraemon: Nobita's Dinosaur (1980, Dolmanstein)

==== Dubbing ====
- American Hero
- Intern (Director Goldstone ( Broderick Crawford ))
- Invader (Edgar Scovill)
- Bewitched (Samantha's dad (substitute), etc.)
- A brilliant accomplice
- Gilligan SOS
- Gunslinger "The Devil's Freight Car"
- Sunset 77
- Chicago Special Investigation Team M
- Star Trek
- Mission Impossible
  - Season 3, Episode 13 (George Simpson
  - Season 3 #23 (Minister of Finance)
  - Season 4, Episode 2 (Dr. Zegler)
  - Season 5, Episode 9 (Colonel Kellerman ( Anthony Zerbe ))
- Space 1999
  - Escape! Transformation Planet Psycon (Mentor)
  - Terror of the Fourth Dimension (Mentor)
