= The Golden Bat =

Japanese Superhero

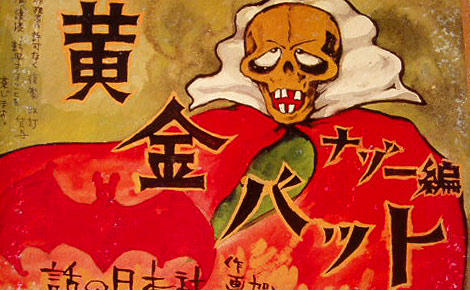
- Ōgon Bat as seen in a kamishibai
- First appearance: Kuro Bat ("The Black Bat") (1930)
- Created by: Takeo Nagamatsu; Suzuki Ichiro
- Portrayed by: Ryûji Ueda (1950 film); Hirohiko Sato (1966 film)
- Voiced by: Osamu Kobayashi (1966 film), (1967-68 anime series)

In-universe information
- Gender: Male
- Occupation: Superhero

The Golden Bat (Japanese: 黄金 バット, Hepburn: Ōgon Batto or simply just Ōgon Bat; known as Fantoma in the English version of the anime), is a Japanese superhero created by Suzuki Ichiro and Takeo Nagamatsu in the autumn of 1930 who originally debuted in a kamishibai (paper theater).

Golden Bat is considered by some to be not only the first-ever superhero in Japanese media, but also the first modern-day superhero anywhere in the world. The Golden Bat also predates later superhero characters such as the Japanese kamishibai character Prince of Gamma (debut early 1930s), and the American comic book characters Superman (debut 1938) and Batman (debut 1939).

The franchise's storylines generally depict Golden Bat Bat, a mysterious cackling, albeit heroic skull-faced warrior fighting against the evil Dr. Nazō and his gang who wants to dominate the world and destroy all order.

Golden Bat Bat later appeared in numerous Japanese pop culture media, including manga, anime, and Japanese films, as well as toys (including by Marusan Shōten in 1998–2001) and postage stamps dating back to 1932. It was adapted into various live-action films and a popular anime television series in 1967.

== History ==
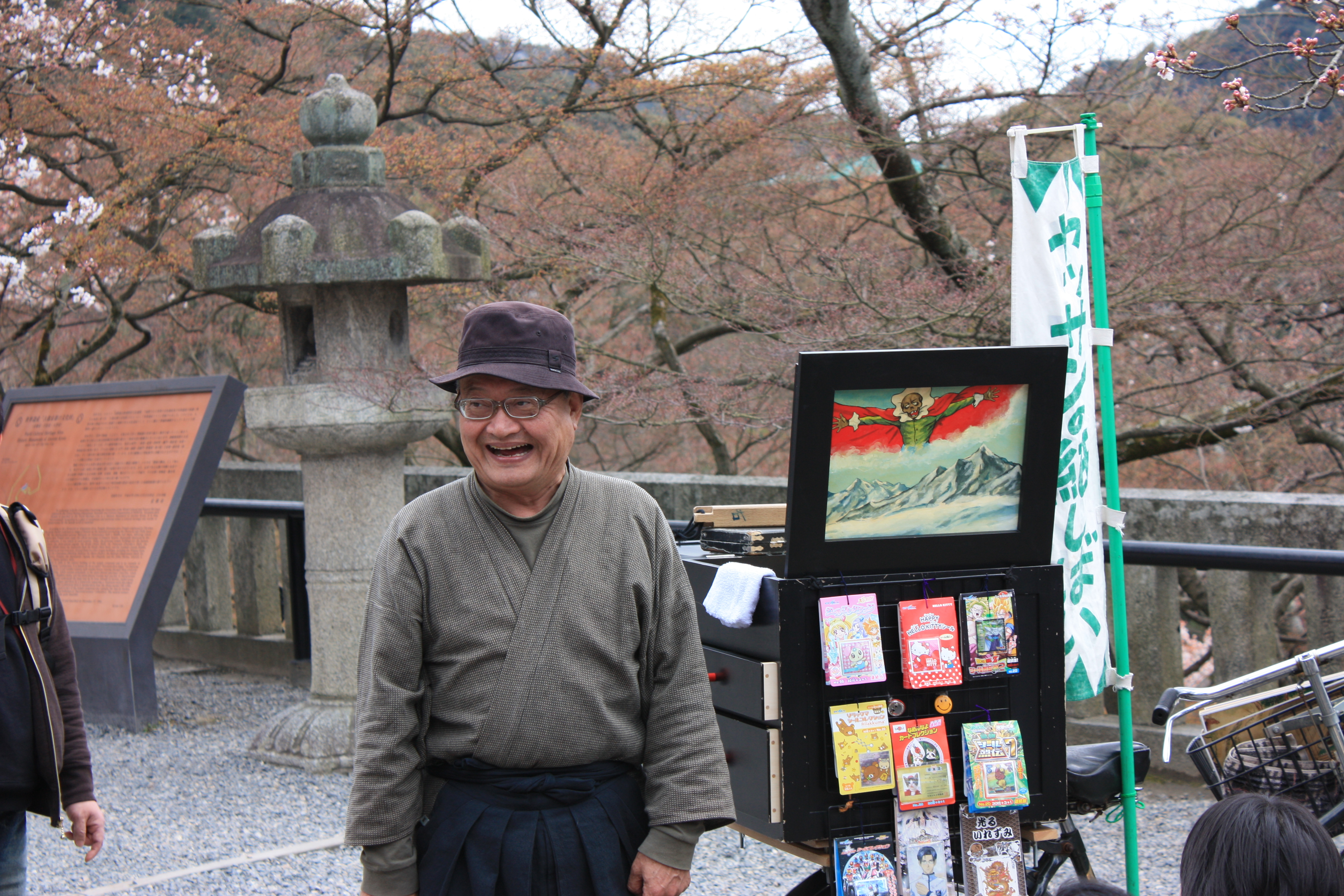
Kamishibai artist narrating a story on Ōgon Bat

Before Golden Bat debuted, in 1930, a villainous protagonist was created known as Black Bat, a phantom thief depicted committing robberies until the former debuted and defeated him. Since Golden Bat gained more popularity with children, Kuro Bat was reworked as the series' main villain, Dr. Nazō, with Golden Bat Bat becoming the titular protagonist ever since.

Golden Bat Bat was created by 16-year-old Takeo Nagamatsu and 25-year-old Suzuki Ichiro, and was named after the Golden Bat cigarette brand and about 440 volumes were released over a two-year period starting in 1931. The two were inspired by drawings of mythological characters in Tokyo's Ueno Royal Museum to create a new hero based on science rather than mythology. The franchise was also co-illustrated and written by Koji Kata, a friend of Nagamatsu. The character debuted in a kamishibai, a type of traveling show in which a sequence of pictures are shown, narrated by a storyteller. The character was popular enough to survive the decline of kamishibai following World War II, and was eventually adapted into manga by Shōnen Gahōsha that ran from 1948 to 1950 (including one by Osamu Tezuka).

Most of Nagamatsu's original works no longer exist due to most of them being lost or destroyed by fires in the war. What is known to remain of the original is 37 paintings of the original Golden Bat itself, thanks to it's popularity, which were kept and preserved by Nagamatsu's eldest daughter Taniguchi Yoko. However, no known paintings of the original Black Bat also still exist.

The character featured in three live-action movies: Golden Bat: The Phantom of the Skyscraper (黄金バット 摩天楼の怪人), released by Shin-eiga Co., Ltd. and distributed by Toei in 1950 based on the manga adaptation by Shōnen Gahōsha; Golden Bat also released by Toei in 1966; and the comedy biopic Here comes the Golden Bat! (黄金バットがやってく), released in 1972 by Toho. He also appeared in a 52-episode anime series that aired on Nippon TV from 1967 to 1968. He was voiced by Osamu Kobayashi in both the live-action film by Toei and Anime version.

Since the character was so popular in South Korea, they made their own mockbuster versions without authorization, such as featuring Golden Bat modeled on D.C's Batman with a yellow suit colorization to match Golden Bat's characteristics in movies such as Black Star and Golden Bat (검은별과 황금박쥐) released in 1979 and a live-action knock-off version of the latter known as Super Betaman and Mazinger V (스타 짱가 Z 마징가 V 슈퍼 베타맨) in 1990. And in 1991, another Korean live-action parody film was madeYoung-Gu and the Golden Bat (영구와 황금박쥐) as part of the Young-Gu and Taengchil comedy series starring comedian Shim Hyung-rae as Young-Gu.

=== Revivals ===
Despite Golden Bat's legacy in Japan, there have been few to no official new adaptations consisting of the franchise. In the late 1990s or early 2000s, a reboot for the original 1960s anime titled The Golden Bat: Millennium Version (黄金のバット：ミレニアムバージョン) was planned but was scrapped and only a trailer so far ever aired. Garo, as shown in early concepts, was originally intended to be a modernized version of Golden Bat named "Skull Z" but ended up being a completely different character in the final version.

In December 2022, a new manga adaptation illustrated by Kazutoshi Yamane was launched in Champion Red magazine by Akita Shoten.

== Character description ==
Golden Bat has a golden skull-shaped head, wears a green and white swashbuckler outfit with a high-collared red cape, and carries a rapier. He lives in a fortress in the Japanese Alps. In the Shōnen Gahōsha comics, he retains a similar appearance to the original albeit with clothes including a hat with a feather designed after a Musketeer.

The Toei version of his character, also created for the anime has a design consisting that of an all-golden muscular skeleton wearing a black and red Dracula-like cape and wrestler boots, holds a silver baton and has an appearance similar to Skeletor and Scare Glow from Masters of the Universe. He is a being from ancient Atlantis who was sent forward in time 10,000 years to battle evil forces of Nazō and his subordinates threatening the present day.

His superpowers include superhuman strength, invulnerability, and the ability to fly.

Ōgon Bat's archnemesis is Dr. Erich Nazō (ナゾー), formerly known as Black Bat (黒バット "Kuro Batto"), the leader of a crime syndicate bent on world domination leading tens of thousands of subordinates, who wears a black costume and mask with bat-like ears similar to that of Batman's, a red eye and a blue eye. The Toei version of Nazō also created for the Anime version has an updated look of having four eyes being red, blue, green and yellow and has a mechanical claw on his left hand.

In the anime version, Golden Bat also has an evil counterpart of himself known as Darkness Bat (暗闇バット "Kurayami Batto"), another being hailing from ancient Atlantis who is identical in appearance to him albeit in dark blue.

== Media ==
=== 1950 Film ===
Golden Bat: The Phantom of the Skyscraper
- Directed by: Toshio Shimura
- Music by: Shunsuke Kikuchi
- Production company: Shin-Eigasha Ltd.
- Distributed by: Toei Company (Japan)
- Release date: December 23, 1950
- Running time: 71 minutes
- Country: Japan

The first live-action film version of Golden Bat was released theatrically by Shin-eiga Co., Ltd. and distributed by Tokyo Film Distribution Co., Ltd. now known as Toei in the December of 1950 and it is based on the manga adaptation by Shōnen Gahōsha.

==== Synopsis ====
Ultron, a fearsome superatom invented by Dr. Ogata wills to use it for peaceful purposes. However, he is targeted by Dr. Nazo and his QX gang who want to use the superatom in order to threaten humanity. However, soon shows up Golden Bat to foil Nazo's plan.

==== Cast ====
- Ryuji Ueda as Golden Bat
- Hiroshi Sugi as Seiichiro Ogata
- Yukio Mosaki as Masaru
- Reiko Suzuoka as Kazuko
- Ryuko Kawaji as Ranko
- Takehiko Kobe as Puku-chan
- Ryuji Ueda as Yuji Oki
- Taizo Fukami as Teruyuki Maki
- Unknown actor as Dr. Nazo
- Arata Sejima as Dobsky
- Masao Shimizu as Inspector Horie
- Hibari Misora
- Ootora Fukutaro
- Takeichi Suzuki
- Shin Tatsuma
- Rokuro Hida
- Matsumoto Heikuro
- Hiroshi Yanagida
- Isamu Yonekura
- Kintaro Wakamiya
- Tanaka Fudeko
- Chinatsu Sagiri
- Hibari Misora

=== 1966 Film ===
Ōgon Bat
- Directed by: Hajime Sato
- Written by: Susumu Takaku
- Starring: Sonny Chiba
- Music by: Shunsuke Kikuchi
- Distributed by: Toei Company (Japan)
- Release date: December 21, 1966 (Japan)
- Running time: 73 minutes
- Country: Japan
- Language: Japanese

A live-action film version of Golden Bat was released theatrically by Toei in Japan on December 21, 1966, starring Sonny Chiba as Dr. Yamatone (ヤマトネ博士, Yamatone Hakase). It was also released in Italy as Il Ritorno di Diavolik (The return of the Diavolik).

On February 12, 2024, Shout! Studios released the film on Blu-Ray for a limited time titled Golden Ninja. This marks the first known time Golden Bat was ever officially released in the United States.

==== Plot ====
When young Akira Kazahaya spots the rogue planet Icarus on a collision course for Earth, he is recruited by Captain Yamatone into the Pearl Research Institute in the Japanese Alps, secretly an U.N. organization that protects the Earth, who is searching for the final component to complete Dr. Pearl's Super Destruction Beam Cannon to destroy Icarus. When Captain Yamatone's unit, along with Akira and Pearl's granddaughter Emily, searches for the material for the lens on a mysterious island they soon realize is Atlantis, they are attacked by the evil forces of the Ruler of the Universe Nazō (ナゾー) in a drill-shaped tower ship, who is the one who sent Icarus towards Earth, and force Yamatone to retreat into an ancient tomb holding a sarcophagus with a prophecy that after 10,000 years, a crisis will inevitably come and to awaken the one within to fight it. Just as Nazō's men burst in and try and surround the institute's people, Emily places water on Golden Bat's chest and revives him. Laughing, Golden Bat sizes up the situation, defeats the alien attackers and sends a bat to Emily, which turns into a pin, allowing her to call him when there is danger. Golden Bat then fights off Nazō's tower, allowing Yamatone and the institute people to return with the lens.

Undeterred, Nazō gathers his three top agents, Viper, Piranha, and Jackal, who he sends to infiltrate the Institute and retrieve the lens and the beam cannon using their own unique abilities. Nazō successfully captures Dr. Pearl, Emily, and the Super Destruction Beam, but is frustrated by his minions' inability to find the lens and Dr. Pearl's resistance to interrogation, Pearl realizing far more than Earth would be in danger if a villain like Nazō were to gain the weapon, until he realizes Yamatone gave the lens to Golden Bat, and Nazō tricks Emily into calling for him, resulting in a climactic battle with the fate of Earth at stake.

==== Cast ====
- Sonny Chiba as Dr. Yamatone (ヤマトネ博士, Yamatone Hakase)
- Hirohiko Sato (suit) (uncredited) and Osamu Kobayashi (voice) as Golden Bat
- Wataru Yamakawa as Akira Kazahaya
- Hisako Tsukuba as Naomi Akiyama
- Emiri Takami as Emily Beard
- Andrew Hughes as Dr. Parl (dubbed by Hirohiko Sato)
- Hirohisa Nakada as agent Shimizu
- Kōsaku Okano as agent Nakamura
- Kouji Sekiyama as Nazō
- Youichi Numada as Keroido / Viper
- Keiko Kuni as Perania / Piranha
- Keiichi Kitakawa as Jackal
- Yukio Aoshima as police officer

=== Anime ===
- Golden Bat

黄金バット (Ōgon Batto)
- Genre: Fantasy, superhero
- Anime television series
- Directed by: Noboru Ishiguro; Kujiro Yanagida; Seiji Sasaki; Tadao Wakabayashi
- Written by: Mitsuhide Shimauchi
- Music by: Tanaka Masashi
- Studio: Dai-ichi Dōga
- Original network: Yomiuri TV, Nippon TV
- English network: AU: Nine Network
- Original run: April 1, 1967 – March 23, 1968
- Episodes: 52

Golden Bat (Japanese: 黄金 バット, Hepburn: Ōgon Batto) is an anime television series released in 1967. It was also one of the most popular anime shows during its run. The show itself's designs for the characters and elements are based on those in the previous live-action film version by Toei and Osamu Kobayashi reprised his role as Golden Bat. Before the show aired while it was still in production, a manga for the show was released by Daitosha and Shōnen Gahōsha on December 25, 1966, which was the same year the film premiered.

The anime aired in South Korea on the Tongyang Broadcasting Company and was one of the few works to be exempt from the latter's restrictions on Japanese-related media since it was a co-production and was in-fact one of the most popular anime shows in Korea.

The show also aired in a limited number of regions outside of Asia and under various different titles including in English titled Phantaman or Fantoma: Warrior of Justice dubbed by Frontier Enterprises and only aired in Australia on GTV-9. It also aired as Fantasmagórico in Latin America and was also one of the most popular anime shows there, Fantomas in Brazil and Fantaman in Italy. The show never aired in the United States.

==== Plot ====
Lord Nazo, a German mad scientist, aims to conquer the world via various destructive criminal activities and leads tens of thousands of subordinates by his side. In search of the lost city of Atlantis, Archaeologist Dr. Mire and his daughter Marie on a ship leads an expedition that ends in disaster when Nazo finds them and attacks their ship with a mechanical beast. Initially unknown to them, Marie survived the attack ending up on a life boat, unconscious. Fortunately, she ends up found and rescued by Dr. Yamatone's son, Takeru, and joins their mission to find the lost city of Atlantis.

Once their aircraft has run out of fresh water, a fluid necessary for its operation, they land on an island in hopes of finding some. Much to their relief, the island turns out to be none other than Atlantis. Nazo turns out to have pursued them in order to kill them all. Once Nazo sends his mechanical beast to confront them, the crew scurries into the tomb, only to find a coffin. After reading the instructions of Dr. Mire's book Marie kept safe, they pour water on the golden skeletal-like creature located inside going by the name of Golden Bat, causing him to awake up after thousands of years. The monster saves them from the mechanical beast thanks to his astonishing superpowers. From then on, Golden Bat answers Marie's calls to fights against Lord Nazo.

==== Cast ====
Character	English name	Japanese voice actor	English voice actor
Golden Bat (黄金 バット)	Fantoma	Osamu Kobayashi	Burr Middleton
Lord Nazō (ナゾー 様とは)	Dr. Zero	Ushio Shima	Burr Middleton
Professor Yamatone (ヤマトネ博士)	Dr. Steel	Ichirō Murakoshi	William Ross
Lord Mazō (マゾ様 )	Gorgo	Kenji Utsumi	?
Marie Mire (マリー)	Mary	Minori Matsushima (later Yōko Kuri)	Patricia Kobayashi
Takeru Yamatone (ヤマトネタケル)	Terry Steel	Kazue Takahashi	?
Dareo Dokono (ダレオ・ドコノ)	Gabby	Kazuya Tatekabe	Burr Middleton
Professor Mire (ミレ博士)	Dr. Miller	Koichi Chiba	?
Darkness Bat (暗闇バット)	Dr. Death	Masao Takato	?
Narrator		Yuzuru Fujimoto	Burr Middleton

==== List of anime episodes ====
No.	Title	Original release date
1	"The Birth of Golden Bat"; Transliteration: "Kogane Batto Tanjō" (Japanese: 黄金バット誕生)	April 1, 1967
2	"Mammoth Killer"; Transliteration: "Manmosu Kirā" (Japanese: マンモスキラー)	April 8, 1967
3	"Ge-Georg"; Transliteration: "Gē-georugu" (Japanese: ゲーゲオルグ)	April 15, 1967
4	"Crisis"; Transliteration: "Kiki Ippatsu" (Japanese: 危機一発)	April 22, 1967
5	"Man Eating Plants"; Transliteration: "Hito-gui Shokubutsu" (Japanese: 人食い植物)	April 29, 1967
6	"In Pursuit of the Melon Bombs"; Transliteration: "Meron Bakudan Daitsuiseki" (Japanese: メロン爆弾大追跡)	May 6, 1967
7	"Monster Sand Beronya"; Transliteration: "Kaijū Sando Beroniya" (Japanese: 怪獣サンドベロニヤ)	May 13, 1967
8	"Space Monster Alligon"; Transliteration: "Uchū Kaijū Arugon" (Japanese: 宇宙怪獣アリゴン)	May 20, 1967
9	"Worm Monster Gaigon"; Transliteration: "Kaibutsu Gaigon" (Japanese: 怪物ガイゴン)	May 27, 1967
10	"The Battle of Uranium Island"; Transliteration: "Uranshima Daisakusen" (Japanese: ウラン島大決戦)	June 3, 1967
11	"The Mystery of Finkhamen"; Transliteration: "Nazo no Finkāmen" (Japanese: 謎のフィンカーメン)	June 10, 1967
12	"Dr. Jinger's Poison Mushrooms"; Transliteration: "Jingā no Doku Kinoko" (Japanese: ジンガーの毒キノコ)	June 17, 1967
13	"Mutant 5"; Transliteration: "Myūtanto 5" (Japanese: ミュータント5)	June 24, 1967
14	"Atomic Black Gyatt"; Transliteration: "Genshi Burakku Gyatto" (Japanese: 原子ブラックギャット)	July 1, 1967
15	"Nero the Destructor"; Transliteration: "Hakaima Nero" (Japanese: 破壊魔ネロ)	July 8, 1967
16	"Ghilton, the Stone Man"; Transliteration: "Iwa Hito Girudon" (Japanese: 岩人ギルトン)	July 15, 1967
17	"Galgar the Monster Bird"; Transliteration: "Kaichō Gāgā" (Japanese: 怪鳥ガルガー)	July 22, 1967
18	"The Star of Polynesia"; Transliteration: "Porineshia no Hoshi" (Japanese: ポリネシアの星)	July 29, 1967
19	"Bat vs. Bat"; Transliteration: "Batto Tai Batto" (Japanese: バット対バット)	August 5, 1967
20	"The Land of the Blue Flame"; Transliteration: "Aoi Honō no Kuni" (Japanese: 青い炎の国)	August 12, 1967
21	"The Queen of Root Sigma"; Transliteration: "Rūto Shiguma no Joō" (Japanese: ルートシグマの女王)	August 19, 1967
22	"The Mystery of Volcano Peron"; Transliteration: "Nazo no Peron Kazan" (Japanese: 謎のペロン火山)	August 26, 1967
23	"Black Mask the Thief"; Transliteration: "Kaitō Burakku Kamen" (Japanese: 怪盗ブラック仮面)	September 2, 1967
24	"The Devil's Ruby"; Transliteration: "Akuma no Rubī" (Japanese: 悪魔のルビー)	September 9, 1967
25	"The Robot City"; Transliteration: "Robotto Toshi" (Japanese: ロボット都市)	September 16, 1967
26	"Rayman Boldo"; Transliteration: "Kōsen Ningen Borudo" (Japanese: 光線人間ボルド)	September 23, 1967
27	"The Eye of Tarangé"; Transliteration: "Tarangē no Me" (Japanese: タランゲーの眼)	September 30, 1967
28	"Sword of the Queen Axis"; Transliteration: "Akishisu no Ken" (Japanese: アキシスの剣)	October 7, 1967
29	"Mystery of the Space Bat"; Transliteration: "Uchū Kōmori no Nazo" (Japanese: 宇宙コウモリの謎)	October 14, 1967
30	"Superpowered Cyborgs"; Transliteration: "Chō Nōryoku Kaizō Ningen" (Japanese: 超能力改造人間)	October 21, 1967
31	"The Ghost Tower"; Transliteration: "Yū Rei-tō" (Japanese: ゆうれい塔)	October 28, 1967
32	"The Devil's Giant Statue"; Transliteration: "Akuma no Kyozō" (Japanese: 悪魔の巨像)	November 4, 1967
33	"The Invisible Monster Glassgon"; Transliteration: "Tōmei Kaijū Gurasugon" (Japanese: 透明怪獣グラスゴン)	November 11, 1967
34	"The Great World Flood"; Transliteration: "Sekai Dai Kōzui" (Japanese: 世界大洪水)	November 18, 1967
35	"Underground Monster Mogurah"; Transliteration: "Chitei Kaijū Mogurā" (Japanese: 地底怪獣モグラー)	November 25, 1967
36	"The Great Explosion"; Transliteration: "Chikyū Dai Bakuhatsu" (Japanese: 地球大爆発)	December 2, 1967
37	"Two-Headed Monster Gegera"; Transliteration: "Sōtō Kaijū Gegera" (Japanese: 双頭怪獣ゲゲラ)	December 9, 1967
38	"The Dinosaur Trap"; Transliteration: "Kyōryū no Wana" (Japanese: 恐竜の罠)	December 16, 1967
39	"The Skeleton's Pilotage"; Transliteration: "Gaikotsu no Mizusakian'nai" (Japanese: 骸骨の水先案内)	December 23, 1967
40	"The Day of Darkness"; Transliteration: "Chikyū Ankoku no Hi" (Japanese: 地球暗黒の日)	December 30, 1967
41	"The Indian Princess"; Transliteration: "Indo no Joō" (Japanese: インドの女王)	January 6, 1968
42	"The Witch and Monster Hiidoro"; Transliteration: "Yōba no Kaijū Hīdoro" (Japanese: 妖婆の怪獣ヒードロ)	January 13, 1968
43	"The Cyclops in the Mine"; Transliteration: "Haikō no hHitotsu-me Kaijū" (Japanese: 廃坑の一つ目怪獣)	January 20, 1968
44	"Revenge of the Liger Man"; Transliteration: "Raigāman no Gyakushū" (Japanese: ライガーマンの逆襲)	January 27, 1968
45	"The Death-bringing Woman"; Transliteration: "Shi o Yobu On'na" (Japanese: 死を呼ぶ女)	February 3, 1968
46	"The Bat Hag and the Monster Shelgon"; Transliteration: "Kōmori Rōjo to Kaijū Sherugon" (Japanese: こうもり老女と怪獣シェルゴン)	February 10, 1968
47	"The Mysterious Gerontium 90"; Transliteration: "Maboroshi no Geronchūmu 90" (Japanese: 幻のゲロンチューム90)	February 17, 1968
48	"The Little Assassins"; Transliteration: "Chīsai Asashin" (Japanese: 小さい暗殺者)	February 24, 1968
49	"The Bat Man"; Transliteration: "Kaijin Kōmori Otoko" (Japanese: 怪人こうもり男)	March 2, 1968
50	"Circus Monster Gablar"; Transliteration: "Sākasu Kaijū Gaburā" (Japanese: サーカス怪獣ガブラー)	March 9, 1968
51	"The Resurrection of Dark Bat"; Transliteration: "Yomigaeru Kurayami Batto" (Japanese: よみがえる暗闇バット)	March 16, 1968
52	"The Crumbling of the Nazō Empire"; Transliteration: "Hibiwareru Nazō Teikoku" (Japanese: ひびわれるナゾー帝国)	March 23, 1968

== Notes ==
- Only the original depiction of the franchise is public-domain in both Japan and America. The movie and anime adaptations of the franchise are still protected by their own copyright holders.
