= Kamishibai =

Form of Japanese street theatre and storytelling

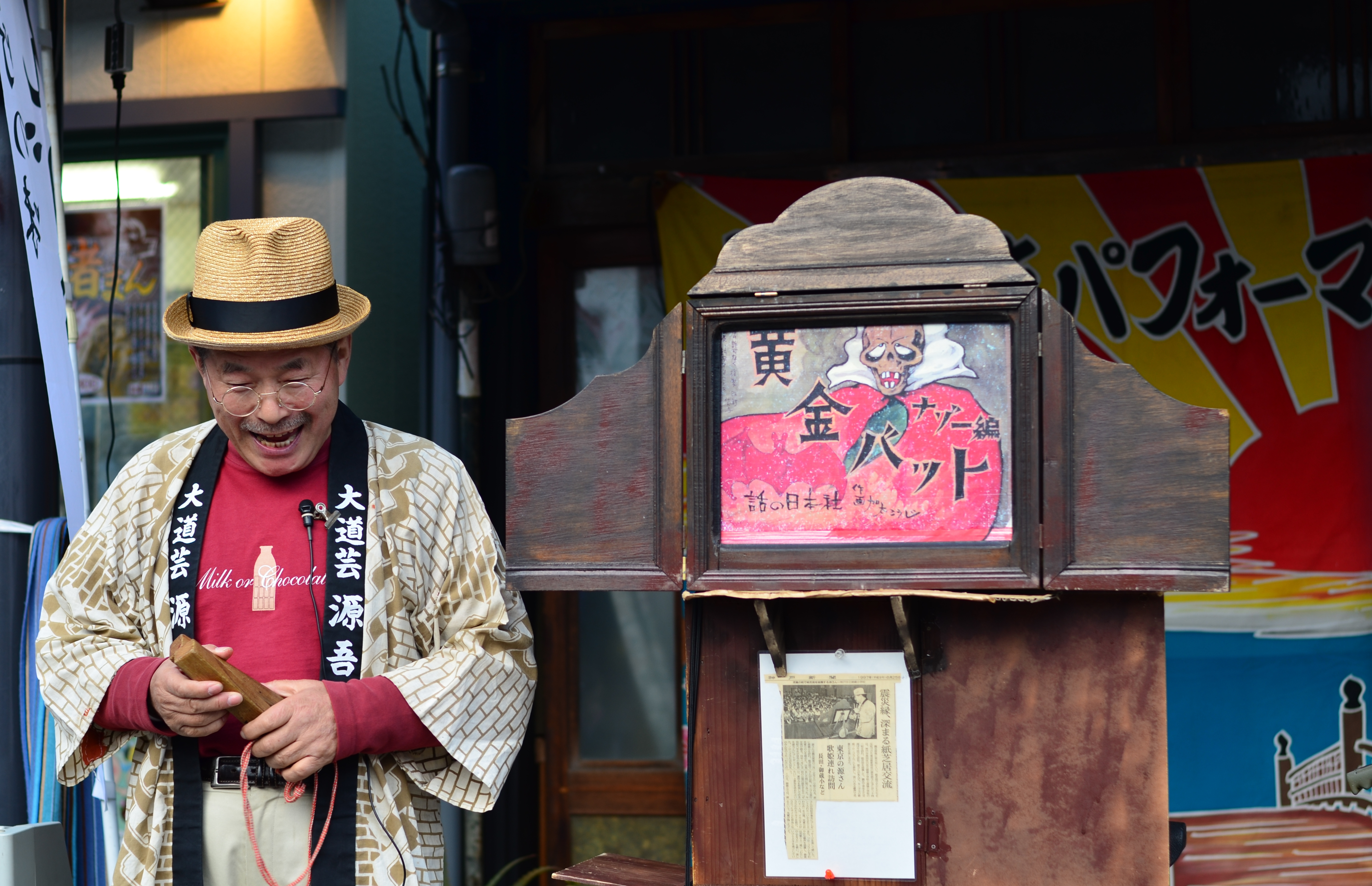
A kamishibaiya (kamishibai artist) in Tokyo depicting a tale of the Ōgon Bat character.

Kamishibai (紙芝居, "paper play") is a form of Japanese street theater and storytelling that was popular during the Great Depression of the 1930s and the postwar period in Japan until the advent of television during the mid-20th century. Kamishibai were performed by a kamishibaiya ("kamishibai narrator") who travelled to street corners with sets of illustrated boards that they placed in a miniature stage-like device and narrated the story by changing each image.

Kamishibai has its earliest origins in Japanese Buddhist temples, where Buddhist monks from the 8th century onward used emakimono ("picture scrolls") as pictorial aids for recounting their history of the monasteries, an early combination of picture and text to convey a story.

== History ==
=== Origins ===
The exact origins of kamishibai during the 20th century are unknown, appearing "like the wind on a street corner" in the Shitamachi section of Tokyo around 1930. It is believed, however, that kamishibai has deep roots in Japan's etoki ("pictorial storytelling") art history, which can be traced back to the 12th-century emaki scrolls, such as the Chōjū giga ("Frolicking Critters"), attributed to the priest Toba Sōjō (1053–1140). The scroll depicts anthropomorphised animal caricatures that satirise society during this period but has no text, making it a pictorial aid to a story. It can therefore be considered a direct precursor of kamishibai.

During the Edo period (1603–1868), visual and performing arts flourished, particularly through the proliferation of ukiyo-e ("pictures of the floating world"). Etoki once again became popular during the later 18th century as storytellers began to set up on street corners with an unrolled scroll hanging from a pole. In the Meiji period (1868–1912), tachi-e ("stand-up pictures"), similar to those in the Edo period, were told by performers who manipulated flat paper cutouts of figures mounted on wooden poles (similar to the shadow puppets of Indonesia and Malaysia). The Zen priest Nishimura is also credited to have used these pictures during sermons to entertain children. Another form of etoki was the Japanese-modified stereoscope imported from the Netherlands. Much smaller in size, six engravings of landscapes and everyday scenes would be placed one behind the other on top of the device and lowered when required so that the viewer, who looked at them through a lens, could experience the illusion of space created by this device. The artistic and technological developments of the Edo and Meiji periods can be linked to the establishment of kamishibai.

=== Golden age ===
Kamishibai, cartoons, and comics became substantially popular during the Great Depression of the 1930s and after the Japanese surrender to the Allied Forces in August 1945 at the end of the Second World War. This period is known as the "Golden Age" of kamishibai in Japan. Kamishibai produced and narrated over this period give insight into the minds of the people who lived through such a tumultuous period in history. Contrary to the hardships imposed by the Depression, in 1933 there were 2,500 kamishibaiya in Tokyo alone, who performed ten times a day for audiences of up to thirty children, equalling a total of one million children a day. The Depression years were the most prosperous and vibrant for kamishibai: with 1.5 million unemployed in Tokyo in 1930, it provided a great job opportunity for many people.

As kamishibai gained popularity in the 1930s, concerns emerged among educators and parents about its lack of educational value and its association with vulgar or grotesque content. However, some progressive educators recognized its potential as a teaching tool. Figures such as Christian educator Imai Yone advocated for kamishibai to deliver moral lessons to urban and rural children, particularly those from impoverished backgrounds. In 1938, the Nippon Kyōiku Kamishibai Kyōkai (National Association for Educational Kamishibai) was established, producing storycards with progressive, often rural-focused themes emphasizing the sincerity of the working classes. One notable example is Uzura ("The Quails"), which depicted a selfless girl in famine-stricken Tōhoku.

During the 1930s and 1940s, the Japanese government co-opted kamishibai for wartime propaganda. Its accessibility and performative nature made it a powerful medium for mobilizing both urban and rural populations. Propaganda kamishibai plays were mass-produced and disseminated through official networks, targeting audiences in Japan and its colonies, including Korea, Taiwan and Manchuria. These plays aimed to foster loyalty and sacrifice for the emperor and the nation, with performances often conducted by conscripted young women in schools, factories, and neighborhood associations. In contrast to the lively and improvisational street-corner kamishibai, wartime performances were tightly controlled, with strict scripts and subdued delivery to emphasize the story over the performer. While many plays promoted patriotism, some subtly conveyed the futility of war, focusing on shared suffering and collective endurance.

The early postwar period was particularly hard on the citizens of Japan who wanted to rebuild their lives in a rapidly changing environment. Comics became popular in newspapers and magazines, depicting scenes of everyday life injected with humour. A strong publishing industry emerged from the demand for comics, but outside of this industry, the desire for cheap entertainment further stimulated the demand for kamishibai. Five million children and adults were entertained across Japan daily during the postwar period.

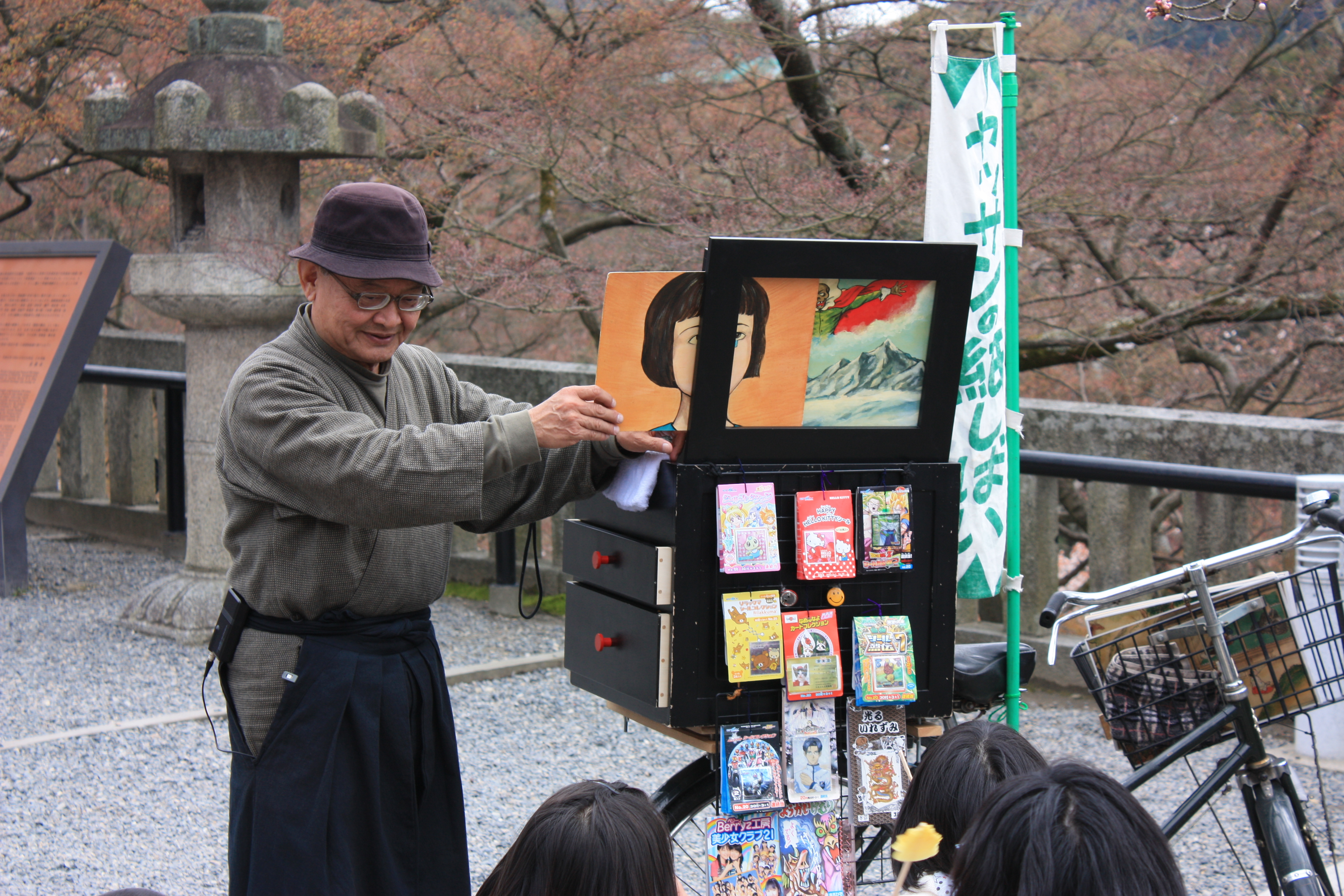
A kamishibai storyteller at Kiyomizu-dera

The gaito kamishibaiya ("street-corner kamishibai storyteller") parked their bicycle at a familiar intersection and banged their hyōshigi ("clapping sticks") together to announce their presence and create anticipation for the show. When the audience arrived they would sell sweets to the children as a fee for the show, which was their main source of income. They would then unfold a butai, a miniature wooden proscenium which held the illustrated boards for the narrator to change as he narrated (and provided sound effects for) the unscripted story. True artists only used hand-painted original art, not the mass-produced kind found in schools or for other communication purposes.

Kamishibai kashimoto (dealers) were sought to commission and rent artwork to narrators for a small fee. The creation of these boards was similar to that of an American comic book company, with each person separately doing the colouring of a panel. The principal illustrator would make pencil sketches that were then done over with thick brushes of India ink. Watercolour paint was then applied to delineate the background and foreground, an opaque tempera paint was then added on top and lastly a coat of lacquer to give it shine and protect it from the elements. A mix of "trashy pop culture" and fine artistry, kamishibai blended the traditional linear style of Japanese painting with the heavy chiaroscuro of Western painting, contrasting light and dark to give the figures depth and dynamism.

There were a variety of popular stories and themes in kamishibai, which are now seen in contemporary manga and anime, including one of the first illustrated costume superheroes in the world, Ōgon Bat ("Golden Bat") in 1931, superheroes with secret identities like Prince Ganma (whose alter ego was a street urchin) and the popular genre of gekiga or "drama pictures".

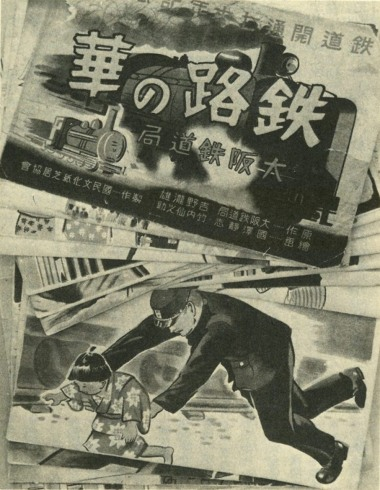
Boards for the story "Shimizu Taemon Died at his Post"

Kamishibai was also utilized as a source of communication to the masses, an "evening news" for adults during the Second World War and the Allied Occupation (1945–1953). There are theories about the acceptance of drawing as a means to communicate in Asian nations more so than in Western nations which can be linked to the different printing technologies utilized in each regions histories. In the West, text and image eventually became separated because of the Gutenberg method of moveable type. It was much easier to employ woodblock printing to depict the complex characters of the Japanese language. Such use was often related to propaganda.

=== Decline ===
The popularity of kamishibai declined at the end of the Allied Occupation and the introduction of television, known originally as denki kamishibai ("electric kamishibai") in 1953. With television bringing larger access to a variety of entertainment, many kamishibai artists and narrators lost their work, with the former turning to drawing gekiga, bringing new talent and narrative to this growing genre.

== Impact on manga and anime ==
Although this Japanese art form has largely disappeared, its significance and contributions have allowed kamishibai to be attributed as an origin for manga. Many prolific manga artists, like Shigeru Mizuki and Sanpei Shirato, were once kamishibai artists before the medium went out of vogue in 1953.

A number of manga and anime have been produced that borrow from or call back to kamishibai tropes and presentation. These include Shōjo Tsubaki, an ero guro manga by Suehiro Maruo based around the titular kamishibai character archetype, and Yamishibai, an anime that uses a kamishibai style to tell myths and urban legends. Additionally, some older works that would later become popular manga or anime, such as GeGeGe no Kitaro, originally started as kamishibai programs.

== Modern usage ==
Kamishibai performance in Asakusa, 2022

As part of the Toyota Production System, kamishibai boards are used as a visual control for performing audits within a manufacturing process. A series of cards are placed on a board and selected at random or according to schedule by supervisors and managers of the area. This ensures safety and cleanliness of the workplace is maintained and that quality checks are being performed.

As of 2013, kamishibai storytelling was being conducted as part of an ongoing campaign to promote world peace. Maki Saji (a Buddhist nun) created a kamishibai based on the story of one of the many children, Sadako Sasaki, who suffered as a result of the atomic bomb raid on Hiroshima in 1945. In May 2010, she was a delegate at a Meeting of the Treaty on the Non-Proliferation of Nuclear Weapons at the United Nations in New York, where she performed to promote a world in harmony and free of nuclear arms.

== See also ==
- Ōgon Bat, a character who originated via the kamishibai medium
- Cantastoria
- Light novel
- Motion comic
- Puppetry
- Vertep
- Raree show
- Shadow play
- Slide show
- Stop motion
- Tokusatsu
- Toy theater
- Visual novel
