= Noboru Ishiguro =

Japanese anime director (1938–2012)

- 石黒 昇
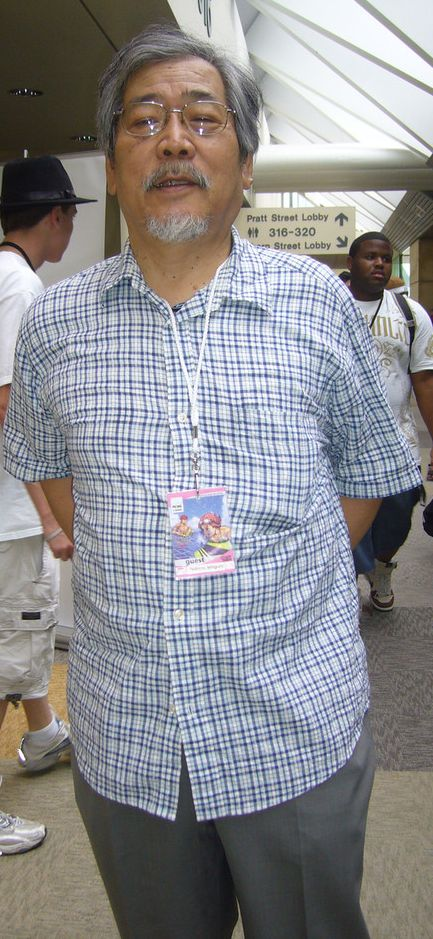
- Ishiguro at Otakon 2009
- Born: 24 March 1938; Tokyo, Japan
- Died: 20 March 2012 (aged 73); Saiwai, Kawasaki, Japan
- Occupations: Manga artist; animator; anime director; anime producer; studio executive
- Years active: 1958–2012
- Known for: Founder of Artland
- Notable work: Space Battleship Yamato series, Super Dimension Fortress Macross, Megazone 23 and Legend of the Galactic Heroes series
- Spouse: Yumi Ishiguro

Noboru Ishiguro (石黒 昇, Ishiguro Noboru; August 24, 1938 – March 20, 2012) was a Japanese anime director, anime producer, and animator. He was the founder and president of the animation studio Artland.

Ishiguro is an anime director who has been active in the Japanese animation industry since the 1970s. His representative works include Space Battleship Yamato, Super Dimension Fortress Macross, Megazone 23 and Legend of the Galactic Heroes.

As a director, he did not emphasize his own style, and instead entrusted important positions to talented and motivated people, regardless of their career.

For Super Dimension Fortress Macross and Megazone 23, he selected young artists such as Haruhiko Mikimoto, Ichirō Itano, and Toshihiro Hirano (currently Toshiki Hirano), most of whom were amateurs except for Itano, and placed them at the core of the production to create works of youthful sensibility. Hiroyuki Yamaga and Hideaki Anno of later Gainax, who were still in college, also joined as part-time workers. They only gathered at Artland for about three years, but many of them got their break through with Macross, and later became representative of Japanese animation.

Ishiguro became interested in the animation industry after seeing Disney's animated feature film Sleeping Beauty. As an animator, he specializes in effects animation and has made it widely known to the Japanese animation industry that such techniques exist. In Space Battleship Yamato, he worked on many of the effects scenes, which was one of the factors that made the work so special. These techniques were then passed on to Ichiro Itano and Hideaki Anno. Anno refers to himself as a "third generation" in the lineage of Ishiguro and Itano's realism-based effects. These animators, along with Yoshinori Kanada, have led the Japanese animation industry by positioning the effects animator in animation as the F/X or VFX creative director in live action.

Ishiguro was good at music, especially classical music, and was one of the few directors in the anime industry who could read music. His participation in the Space Battleship Yamato project was due to the fact that he was favored by producer Yoshinobu Nishizaki, who had musical experience. He also used classical music as background music for the fleet battle scenes with space battleships in Legend of the Galactic Heroes.

Ishiguro was a science fiction enthusiast, and the success of Space Battleship Yamato was greatly influenced by Ishiguro's sci-fi imagination in terms of visuals.

== Biography ==
Ishiguro began drawing manga when he was in elementary school, fascinated by Osamu Tezuka's Shin Takarajima, and debuted as a manga artist for rental manga in his third year of high school (1956). On to the other hand, he was also into movies in high school.

In 1957, he entered the Department of Cinema at Nihon University College of Art. He gave up on continuing as a manga artist as rental manga began to decline due to the gekiga boom that occurred around that time. After giving up on his career as a manga artist, he next formed a Hawaiian music band with his friends and began touring cabarets. Around the same time, he was making independent animation on 8 mm film in college with a group of friends. He also began frequenting the Mushi Production of Osamu Tezuka, a man he admired, located near the university. He eventually attended Nihon University for seven years, and upon graduating in 1964 pursued a career as an animator.

He joined the animation studio Televi Dōga (currently Fuji Television Enterprises), a subsidiary of Fuji Television. After moving from Televi Dōga to Onishi Productions, he then became an independent and founded the Institute of Moving Image Technology in 1966 and JAB (Japan Art Bureau) in 1969 with his friends. However, both were dissolved. Since then, he has worked as a freelance director and storyboard artist.

Ishiguro was the animation director for the TV series Space Battleship Yamato, which began airing in 1974. The work was a huge hit and became an epoch-making work in the history of science fiction animation and Japanese animation, as it was made into a movie and a sequel was also made.

Ishiguro founded the animation studio Artland in September 1978. It started when he rented a room for lodging jointly with his fellow animators in case they couldn't go home.

Ishiguro was the chief director of the TV series Super Dimension Fortress Macross, which began airing in 1982. Following Yamato, he was to participate in a hit production that would go down in the history of Japanese animation. Macross was a project developed by Studio Nue and adopted by advertising agency Bigwest, which secured broadcast slots for sponsoring companies and commercial TV stations. Nue brought the project to Ishiguro, so he was involved from the planning stage. Since Nue was not capable of producing animation, Ishiguro's company, Artland, was to produce it. However, Artland, which specializes in subcontracting, was deemed insufficient, and Tatsunoko Production was selected as the prime contractor. Artland undertook the work as a subcontractor along with Tatsunoko subsidiary Anime Friend.

In 1985, Ishiguro and Artland produced Megazone 23, featuring the core members of Macross. Although Macross itself was highly popular and acclaimed, Ishiguro and Artland, who did not own the copyright, were out of the loop regarding revenue from royalties. So Ishiguro launched this work as an original project on his own, and it became an unusual hit for an OVA. Since Ishiguro wrote the original story, directed the video, and even wrote the novel version, and Artland was the production contractor, they should have made a substantial profit. However, there were problems with the distribution of profits between affiliated companies, Artland actually earned very little profit. Eventually, the production entity was changed to AIC for the sequel, and only the 2nd studio established with a mechanical specialist group participated from Artland. Despite producing two hit works in a row, Artland found itself in financial difficulties, and Ishiguro felt disappointed with the in-house production. In order to concentrate on management, Ishiguro first separated his staff, which had grown to over 50 people, from the studio and made them independent. (Note: Ichiro Itano and other members of the 2nd studio in Kichijoji became independent as D.A.S.T., and the background art section in Takadanobaba became independent as Atelier Booka.)

In 1988, Artland was offered work on the OVA series Legend of the Galactic Heroes and Ishiguro directed the series. The series gained great popularity and ran for 12 years, making it an exceptionally long-running series for an OVA that is not a TV series. In addition, the longer production period of the OVA compared to the TV series allowed Ishiguro to concurrently produce the animation and run the studio, and the regularity of the work improved the business situation at Artland.

Around this time, Artland moved from Ōkubo to Musashi Sakai, renting a four-story building, but in February 2000, the second floor was destroyed by the catch a fire from a neighboring newspaper distributor. Fortunately, since the production had already been digitized, the data could be recovered to some extent. Thanks to this, the studio was spared fatal damage.

In 2005, Artland was contracted to produce the TV series Mushishi. Ishiguro gradually stopped working as a director as he grew tired of the animation industry's increasing emphasis on character business. This work was the first in a long time to spark his passion after he had lost interest in animation for quite some time. He was scheduled to draw a storyboard for one episode, but that was cancelled due to a mistake.

In April 2006, Artland became a subsidiary of Marvelous Entertainment. Ishiguro stayed on as president, but he said he was relieved of the financial and emotional burdens of running a studio. The studio reached its peak since its inception in the fall when it simultaneously produced three TV series as a prime contractor. In addition, the studio has decided to provide social insurance coverage for all employees at the will of Marvelous headquarters. (Note: This is rare in the Japanese animation studios, which lacks capital power, and with few exceptions, such as Studio Ghibli, few animation studios offer social insurance. Most animators are not contracted as employees, but as sole proprietors on a per-work or piece-rate basis.).

Ishiguro died on 20 March 2012 in Kawasaki City Hospital of a lung infection which was the result of a follow-up surgery procedure to the aneurysm surgery he underwent two years prior.

== Works ==
Lists his work as a series director, film director and chief director.

Year	Title	Format	Studio	Role	Remarks column
1963	Gigantor	TV series	TJC	Inbetweening	Joined as a part-time worker.
1964	O-sen Hayato	TV series	P Productions	Inbetweening	Joined as a part-time worker.
1965	Kaitō Pride	TV series	Televi Dōga	Inbetweening, key frame	His professional debut.
1965 (Note: The airing period was 1963–1966.)	Astro Boy	TV series	Mushi Production	Key frame	
1966	Hang On! Marine Kid	TV series	Televi Dōga	Key frame, episode director	
1967-1968	Golden Bat	TV series	Dai-ichi Dōga	Episode director	
1968–1971	Star of the Giants	TV series	Tokyo Movie	Key frame	
1968–1969	The Monster Kid	TV series	A Production, Studio Zero	Episode director	
1968–1969	Sabu to Ichi Torimono Hikae	TV series	Mushi Production, Tōei Dōga, Studio Zero	Episode director	
1969	Sobakasu Pucchi	TV series	Fuji TV Enterprise	Script	
1969	Umeboshi Denka	TV series	A Production, Studio Zero	Episode director	
1969	Dororo	TV series	Mushi Production	Episode director	
1969–1970	Pinch & Punch	TV series	Fuji TV Enterprise	Script	
1969–1970	Moomin	TV series	A Production, Mushi Production	Episode director	
1970	Chippo the Mischievous Angel	TV series	Dai-ichi Dōga	Script	
1970–1971	Ashita no Joe	TV series	Mushi Production	Episode director, storyboards	
1971	Andersen Monogatari	TV series	Mushi Production	Episode director	
1971 -1972	Tensai Bakabon	TV series	A Production	Storyboards	
1971–1972	Kunimatsu-sama no Otoridai!	TV series	Mushi Production	Episode director	
1972	New Moomin	TV series	Mushi Production	Episode director	
1972–1973	Akadō Suzunosuke	TV series	A Production	Storyboards	
1972–1974	The Gutsy Frog	TV series	A Production	Storyboards	
1973	Jungle Kurobe	TV series	A Production	Storyboards	
1973	Doraemon	TV series	Nippon TV Dōga	Storyboards	
1973	Little Wansa	TV series	Mushi Production	Episode director, storyboards	
1973–1974	Kōya no Shōnen Isamu	TV series	A Production	Storyboards	
1973–1974	Zero Tester	TV series	Sunrise	Storyboards	
1973–1974	Karate Master	TV series	A Production	Storyboards	
1973–1974	Aim for the Ace!	TV series	A Production	Storyboards	
1973–1974	Samurai Giants	TV series	A Production	Storyboards	
1974–1975	Vicky the Viking	TV series	Zuiyo, Nippon Animation	Episode director	
1974	Hoshi no Ko Chobin	TV series	Studio Zero	Storyboards for all episodes	
1974–1975	Tamageta kun	TV series	Studio Zero	Animation director, episode director	
1974	Space Battleship Yamato Pilot	Television pilot	Office Academy	Storyboards (Note: With Nobuhiro Okaseko.)	
1974–1975	Space Battleship Yamato	TV series	Office Academy	Animation director, episode director for all episodes, storyboards	He assisted Leiji Matsumoto, a manga artist who became a director without any experience in actually producing anime, and did the actual direction. He checked all the storyboards and reflected the images of Matsumoto and producer Yoshinobu Nishizaki in the work.
1975–1994	Manga Nihon Mukashi Banashi	TV series	Group TAC	Episode director	
1975–1976	Arabian Nights: Sinbad's Adventures	TV series	Nippon Animation	Storyboards	
1975–1977	Grendizer	TV series	Tōei Dōga	Storyboards	
1976–1977	Chōdenji Robo Combattler V	TV series	Tohokushinsha, Soeisha	Storyboards	
1976–1977	Little Lulu and Her Little Friends	TV series	Nippon Animation	Storyboards	
1976–1979	Dokaben	TV series	Nippon Animation	Storyboards	
1976–1979	Manga Sekai Mukashi Banashi	TV series	Madhouse	Episode director	
1976–1977	Robokko Beaton	TV series	Soeisha	Episode director, storyboards	
1977–1979	Yatter	TV series	Tatsunoko Production	Episode director	
1977	Jetter Mars	TV series	Tōei Dōga, Madhouse	Episode director	
1977	Space Battleship Yamato	Feature film	Office Academy	Animation director	Toshio Masuda, the director of the live-action film, who was credited as a supervisor in the TV series but was not involved in the production, edited the footage from the TV series and was credited as the film director. (Note: At the time, animation was regarded as lower in rank than live-action in Japan. Therefore, when compilations of TV series such as Space Battleship Yamato and Hayao Miyazaki's Future Boy Conan were released in movie theaters, live-action film directors were invited in place of TV directors to edit the TV footage, and was credited as a director.)
1977	Glacier Warrior Gaislugger	TV series	Tokyo Movie	Chief Director, Episode Director	
1977–1978	Temple the Balloonist	TV series	Tatsunoko Production	Episode director	
1977–1980	Lupin the 3rd Part II	TV series	Tokyo Movie	Episode director, storyboards	
1977–1978	Manga Nihon Emaki	TV series	World Television	Series director	
1978	Future Boy Conan	TV series	Nippon Animation	Storyboards	
1978	Farewell to Space Battleship Yamato	Feature film	Tōei Dōga	Technical director	Unlike the previous film, Masuda actively participated in the production by directing and writing the script, while Ishiguro assisted him in the animation process.
1978–1979	Space Battleship Yamato II	TV series	Academy Seisaku	Series director, episode director for all episodes, storyboards	As in the previous work, he assisted Matsumoto. Matsumoto, who was very busy, could hardly participate in the production, and Ishiguro played the role of director.
1978–1981	Galaxy Express 999	TV series	Tōei Dōga	OP key frame	
1978–1979	Captain Future	TV series	Tōei Dōga	Storyboards	
1979–1980	The Ultraman	TV series	Sunrise	Storyboards	
1979	Yamato: The New Voyage	Television film	Artland	Technical director	He assisted producer Nishizaki, who had replaced Matsumoto as director himself.
1980	Ganbare Gonbe	TV series	Tsuchida Production	Storyboards	
1980	Phoenix 2772	Feature film	Tezuka Productions	Animation director (Note: With Kazuko Nakamura.)	
1980–1981	Astro Boy	TV series	Tezuka Productions	Series director, script, storyboards	
1981–1987	Ninja Hattori-kun	TV series	Shin-Ei Animation	Script, storyboards	
1982	Thunderbirds 2086	TV series	Green Box, AIC	Supervisor, script	
1982–1983	Super Dimension Fortress Macross	TV series	Tatsunoko Production, Artland	Chief director, script, episode director, storyboards, voice actor (Note: He has a cameo role as Shaw Braxton, the director of the film Shao Pai Long, which is a play within a play.)	
1982–1983	Tokimeki Tonight	TV series	Group TAC	Storyboards	
1983–1984	Super Dimension Century Orguss	TV series	Tokyo Movie Shinsha, Artland	Chief director (Note: With Yasumi Mikamoto.), episode director, storyboards	
1983	Prime Rose	Television film	Tezuka Productions	Storyboards	
1984	Noozles	TV series	Nippon Animation	Episode director, storyboards	
1984	Macross: Do You Remember Love?	Feature film	Tatsunoko Production, Artland	Director (Note: With Shōji Kawamori.)	
1985	Megazone 23 – Part I	OVA	Artland, Tatsunoko	Original author, director, mecha design (Note: With Ichiro Itano, Toshihiro Hirano, and Yasuomi Umezu.)	
1985–1986	Ninja Senshi Tobikage	TV series	Pierrot	Episode director, storyboards	
1985	Yamata no Orochi no Gyakushū	Independent film	Daicon Film	Provision of equipment	
1986	Animated Classics of Japanese Literature (The Harp of Burma)	TV series	Nippon Animation, Artland	Episode director, storyboards	
1986	Megazone 23 – Part II: Please Give Me Your Secret	OVA	Artland, Tatsunoko	Original author, general supervisor	
1988	Legend of the Galactic Heroes: My Conquest is the Sea of Stars	Feature film	Madhouse, Artland	Director	
1988	Topo Gigio	TV series	Nippon Animation, Trans Arts	Series director (Note: With Shigeo Koshi.), script, storyboards	
1988–1989	Legend of the Galactic Heroes – Part I	OVA	Kitty Films	Series director, episode director, storyboards	
1989	Twin	OVA	Lifework	Director , storyboards	
1989	Star Cat Fullhouse	OVA	Artland	Original author, director, lyrics for OP and ED theme songs	
1990	Koiko's Daily Life	OVA	Artland	Director, storyboards	
1989	Megazone 23 – Part III	OVA	AIC, Artmic	Original author (Note: Co-authored with Toshimitsu Suzuki.)	
1989	Locke the Superman: Lord Leon	OVA	Nippon Animation	Director	
1989	Aoki Honō	OVA	Artland, Nippon Animation	Director, storyboards	
1990	Heavy	Feature film	Nippon Animation	Director, storyboards	
1991	Shōnen Ashibe	OVA	Nippon Animation	Director	
1991	Bubblegum Crash	OVA	Artland	Supervisor (Note: With Shinji Aramaki.)	
1991–1992	Legend of the Galactic Heroes – Part II	OVA	Kitty Films	Chief director, storyboards	
1991	Meisō-Ō Border: Shakaifukki-hen	OVA	Artland	Director, storyboards	
1992	Hard & Loose: Shiritsu Tantei Toki Shozō Trouble Notes	OVA	Artland, Nippon Animation	Director, script, storyboards	
1992	Tottoi	Television film	Nippon Animation, Artland	Supervisor	
1992–1993	Mikan Enikki	TV series	Nippon Animation	Series director, storyboards	
1994	Kunichan no Ikka Ran Ran	Short film	Nippon Animation	Segment director	A short anime included in the omnibus movie Dai 2-kai Kinchan no Cinema Jack.
1994–1995	Legend of the Galactic Heroes – Part III	OVA	Kitty Films	Chief director, storyboards	
1996	Bucket de Gohan	TV series	Magic Bus	Storyboards	
1996–1997	Legend of the Galactic Heroes – Part IV	OVA	K-Factory	Chief director, storyboards	
1998	Legend of the Galactic Heroes – Side Stories: A Hundred Billion Stars, a Hundred Billion Lights	OVA	K–Factory	Chief director , episode director, storyboards	
1999–2001	Legend of the Galactic Heroes – Side Stories: Spiral Labyrinth	OVA	K-Factory	Chief director , storyboards	
1999–2002	10 Tokyo Warriors	OVA	Zexcs	Chief director, episode director, storyboards	
2005–2006	Mushi-Shi	TV series	Artland	Production management	
2006	We Were There	TV series	Artland	Production management	
2006–2010	Reborn!	TV series	Artland	Supervisor	
2008–2009	Tytania	TV series	Artland	Series director, storyboards	
2008	Pattenrai!!	Feature film	Mushi Production	Director, storyboards	

== Bibliography ==
- Ishiguro, Noboru; Ohara, Noriko (1980). Telebi Anime Saizensen Shisetsu Anime 17nen-shi テレビ・アニメ最前線 私説・アニメ17年史 [TV & Anime Frontline: Personal opinion 17 years of anime history]. Daiwa Shobo.

== Sources ==
- Hoshi, Makoto (2018). Animation Interview: Densetsu no Anime Creator-tachi アニメーション・インタビュー 伝説のアニメ職人（クリエーター）たち [Animation Interview Legendary Anime Creators]. Mandarake.
- Misono, Makoto (1999). Zusetsu Terebi Anime Zensho 図説テレビアニメ全書 [Illustrated TV anime complete book]. Hara Shobo.
- Animage May 1983 issue (in Japanese). Tokuma Shoten.
