= List of Legend of the Galactic Heroes episodes =

This is a list of episodes for the series Legend of the Galactic Heroes. In-universe dates are given in the Universal Calendar (U.C.) used in the Free Planets Alliance and the Imperial Calendar (R.C.) used in the Galactic Empire.

== Series overview ==
=== Original ===
Has a total of 162 episodes:

Season	Episodes	Originally released	
Season	Episodes	First released	Last released
1	26	December 21, 1988	June 20, 1989
2	28	June 21, 1991	December 27, 1991
3	32	July 20, 1994	February 22, 1995
4	24	October 1, 1996	March 11, 1997
5	24	February 9, 1998	September 30, 1998
6	28	December 1, 1999	June 27, 2000

=== Die Neue These ===
The re-adaptation premiered in 2018 as a 12-episode series, followed by 3 animated films in 2019, and 6 animated films in 2022; each of the films is divided into 4 episodes.

Season	Episodes	Originally released	
Season	Episodes	First released	Last released
1	12	April 3, 2018	June 26, 2018
2	12	September 27, 2019	November 27, 2019
3	12	March 4, 2022	May 13, 2022
4	12	September 30, 2022	November 25, 2022

== Chronological order of episodes and films ==
For the original series; includes movies not mentioned in the list below:

- Golden Wings (From the beginning to 18:30)
- "Spiral Labyrinth" (Gaiden 2, episodes 1–14)
- "Silver-White Valley" (Gaiden 1, episodes 1–4)
- "The Mutineer" (Gaiden 2, ep. 15–18)
- "The Duelist" (Gaiden 2, ep. 19–22)
- Golden Wings (From 18:30 to the end)
- "The Retriever" (Gaiden 2, ep. 23–26)
- "Dream of the Morning, Song of Night" (Gaiden 1, ep. 5–8)
- "A Hundred Billion Stars, a Hundred Billion Lights" (Gaiden 1, ep. 13–24)
- "The Third Tiamat Battle" (Gaiden 2, ep. 27–28)
- My Conquest is the Sea of Stars
- Overture to a New War (From the beginning to 35:40)
- "Disgrace" (Gaiden 1, ep. 9–12)
- Overture to a New War (from 35:40 to the end)
- Main OVA series (The first two episodes have an expanded retelling in Overture to a New War)

== Series 1 ==
The first series covers volumes 1 and 2 of the original novels, adding two stories from the prequel novel The Star Crusher (episodes 9 and 11) and an original story (parts of episodes 13 and 14). The main theme is Reinhard von Lohengramm's rise to power, mirrored by Yang Wen-li's unwillingness to go beyond his military duties and assume a similar position in the Free Planets Alliance.

No.	Title
1	"In the Eternal Night"; Transliteration: "Eien no Yoru no naka de" (Japanese: 永遠の夜の中で)
January 1, 796 U.C. / 487 R.C.: in the Astarte star system, a 20,000 spaceships Imperial fleet under Reinhard von Lohengramm's command is about to be cornered by three Alliance fleets of 13,000 spaceships each. Against the advice of his subordinates, Reinhard decides to strike first in order to defeat each fleet before they can join. The Allied commanders, trusting the overall odds of 2 to 1, don't anticipate this and rebuff Yang Wen-li's advice to quickly regroup their forces.
2	"The Battle of Astarte"; Transliteration: "Asutāte Kaisen" (Japanese: アスターテ会戦)
After the destruction of the 4th and 6th fleets, Reinhard's fleet engages the 2nd Fleet. When its commander is wounded, Yang takes command and manages to escape utter destruction. In Fezzanland, Adrian Rubinsky the Landesherr and Nikolas Boltik, his aide, comment on the battle and note that it won't change the strategic situation.
3	"The Birth of the 13th Fleet"; Transliteration: "Dai Jūsan Kantai Tanjō" (Japanese: 第十三艦隊誕生)
In Heinessen (capital planet of the Free Planets Alliance), a memorial for the soldiers who died at the battle of Astarte is held. The warmongering speech of Job Trüniht, Chairman of the Defence Committee, is interrupted by Jessica Edwards, whose fiancé was killed in the battle: she asks him why the advocates of war always sacrifice the lives of others while hiding in safer places. While going home, she is attacked by members of the Patriotic Knights Corps (P.K.C.), a nationalistic organization secretly led by Trüniht. She is rescued by her friends Yang and Dusty Attenborough and barely escapes death. The next day, Yang is promoted to rear admiral in command of the newly formed 13th Fleet. His mission: to take the Iserlohn fortress, a powerful space station which has repelled every attack.
4	"The Afterglow of the Empire"; Transliteration: "Teikoku no Zanshō" (Japanese: 帝国の残照)
In Odin (capital planet of the Galactic Empire), Reinhard is promoted to Grand Admiral after his victory at Astarte. With his friend Siegfried Kircheis, he pays a visit to his elder sister Annerose, the Kaiser's favorite. In a flashback, Kircheis remembers how he and Reinhard became friends, how Annerose was taken away from her home to be the Kaiser's favorite and how they came to hate the high nobles and the Goldenbaum dynasty.
5	"The Castrop Uprising"; Transliteration: "Kasutoropu Dōran" (Japanese: カストロプ動乱)
A new admiralty is created for Reinhard. He chooses commoners and lesser nobles to command his fleets: August Samuel Wahlen, Cornelius Lutz, Karl Gustav Kempf, Fritz Josef Bittenfeld, Ernest Mecklinger, Wolfgang Mittermeyer and Oskar von Reuenthal. Meanwhile, Maximilian von Castrop has rebelled against the Empire. He thinks he is safe because of the "Artemis Necklace", a system of powerfully armed satellites built with the help of Fezzan. Reinhard sends a fleet under Kircheis' command to put an end to the rebellion. He manages to destroy the necklace. Castrop is killed by his retainers and is the only casualty of the operation.
6	"The Knights of the Rose"; Transliteration: "Bara no Kishi" (Japanese: 薔薇の騎士)
Yang decides to take Iserlohn by a ruse. The Rosen Ritter (Knights of the rose), a ground combat unit made of Imperial exiles, will pose as an imperial crew and infiltrate the fortress. Yang's staff is introduced: Murai, Patrichev, Fischer (a master of fleet maneuvers) and Frederica Greenhill, daughter of Admiral Dwight Greenhill. The Iserlohn fleet is lured away from the fortress by decoys. When a damaged imperial spaceship asks for help, the commander of Iserlohn, who doesn't know where his fleet is due to radar jamming, authorizes it to dock...
7	"Iserlohn Captured!"; Transliteration: "Izerurōn kōryaku!" (Japanese: イゼルローン攻略!)
May, 14, 796 U.C. / 487 R.C.: a fake imperial spaceship docks into Iserlohn. Walter von Schönkopf, commander of the Rosen Ritter, pretends to have important information and takes control of the center of command. The Iserlohn fleet comes back, only to be destroyed by the fortress' main weapon, the "Thor's Hammer". The fall of Iserlohn dramatically changes the strategic balance: Yang hopes it will lead to a peace treaty. Back in Heinessen, he wants to resign, but is promoted to vice-admiral instead.
8	"Cold Cybernetic Eyes"; Transliteration: "Reitetsu naru Gigan" (Japanese: 冷徹なる義眼)
Paul von Oberstein, staff officer to the commander of Iserlohn fleet, is in trouble. He saw through Yang's plan, but his commander didn't listen to him, and he fled before the destruction of the fleet. The three chiefs of the Imperial fleet resign, but want to make him responsible of the defeat. Oberstein meets Reinhard and explains how, like him, he hates the high nobles and the Goldenbaum dynasty, and offer his help. Reinhard agrees and obtains his pardon by advising the Kaiser to refuse the chiefs' resignations.
9	"The Klopstock Incident"; Transliteration: "Kuropushutokku Jiken" (Japanese: クロプシュトック事件)
Thirty years ago, Prince von Klopstock was exiled from the imperial court. He asks Duke von Braunschweig, the Kaiser's son-in-law, to ask forgiveness on his behalf. Braunschweig invites him to his daughter's birthday party. Klopstock's real goal is to bring a bomb in order to kill the Kaiser, who will be there. At the party, Reinhard clashes with baron Flegel. The bomb is taken away by accident and makes little damage. Klopstock commits suicide and the incident is kept secret.
10	"Jessica's War"; Transliteration: "Jeshika no Tatakai" (Japanese: ジェシカの戦い)
Yang is sent to Thernussen (Heinessen's second largest city) with his ward, Julian Mintz, to attend a ceremony at the Military Academy. He meets Jessica Edwards, who is campaigning for the Peace Party candidate in an upcoming election. We learn that Yang, while being loyal to democracy, has no love for the current politicians. The P.K.C. sets a bomb in the Peace Party's headquarters, killing the candidate, but their plan backfires when Jessica, who is the new Peace Party candidate, wins a landslide victory.
11	"The Actress Exits"; Transliteration: "Joyū taijō" (Japanese: 女優退場)
Susanna von Benemünde, a former favorite of the Kaiser, wants to get rid of Annerose and win back the Kaiser's love. She teams up with Flegel, who hopes that a scandal involving Annerose will lead to Reinhard's downfall. Annerose is abducted: she is to be killed and found with a supposed lover from the lower class. She is rescued by Kircheis, Reuenthal, Mittermeyer and Oberstein. Benemünde is forced to commit suicide. Flegel has been smart enough to leave no proof of his involvement, but Oberstein and Reinhard suspect him anyway.
12	"The Invasion of the Empire"; Transliteration: "Teikoku-ryō Shinkō" (Japanese: 帝国領侵攻)
In the Free Planets Alliance, the capture of Iserlohn has intoxicated the public, the military and the politicians. It is possible to invade the Empire from Iserlohn, and many people think it's time to conclude the crusade against tyranny. In the High Council, Joan Lebello (Chairman of Treasury Committee) and Hwan Lewi (Chairman of Human Resources Committee) think it's better to sign a peace treaty because the economy is on the verge of collapsing, but the Chairman explains that they will lose the next election unless they achieve a substantial military victory, so the High Council decides to invade the Empire; only Trüniht sides with Lebello and Lewi. The invasion plan is drafted by commodore Andrew Fork, an ambitious man so sure of the righteousness of the war that he discards any objections, especially those made by Yang, as siding with the enemy. The Free Planet Alliance will send a force of 8 fleets, 30 million men and 200 000 spaceships under the command of Fleet Admiral Lobos, with Admiral Greenhill as Chief of the General Staff. Meanwhile, in Fezzan, Rubinsky warns the Imperial High Commissioner that the Free Planets Alliance is planning a full scale invasion of the Empire.
13	"When the Sad Rain Come..."; Transliteration: "Shūu Kitarinaba" (Japanese: 愁雨来たりなば)
August, 22, 796 U.C. /487 R.C.: the invasion of the Empire has begun. Reinhard implements a scorched earth strategy: all food is taken from the frontier zone, so the "Liberation force" of the Free Planets Alliance will be forced to feed the inhabitants. Reinhard plans to attack the invading fleets when their supply lines will be overstretched. Commodore Ulrich Kesler carries out the orders but, in the process, has to face someone from his past.
14	"The Liberation of the Frontier"; Transliteration: "Henkyō no Kaihō" (Japanese: 辺境の解放)
The Free Planets Alliance fleet has conquered more than 200 star systems (50 million inhabitants) without fighting. In Iserlohn, vice-admiral Casselnes drafts a supply plan, but he is worried about such a heavy burden: for him, Reinhard clearly wants the Free Planets Alliance to exhaust its resources on behalf of the liberated planets. The supply fleet is destroyed by Kircheis because Fork didn't think such an attack was possible. Yang, fearing a scorched earth policy, convinces his fellow fleet commanders to ask for a withdrawal. Riots break out on many planets because of the food shortage and the looting of the soldiers. Fork experiences a case of hysterical blindness in the face of his plan's failure. In Fezzan, Rubinsky grants a new loan to the Free Planets Alliance to maintain the balance: he hopes to economically control both the Empire and the Alliance. October, 10, 796 U.C. / 487 R.C.: Reinhard orders to launch the counterattack.
15	"The Battle of Amritsar"; Transliteration: "Amurittsa Seiiki Kaisen" (Japanese: アムリッツァ星域会戦)
The Free Planets Alliance's withdrawal request came too late to avoid heavy losses. The Empire attacks, destroying the 3rd, 7th and 12th fleets and heavily damaging the 5th, 8th, 9th and 10th fleets; only the 13th Fleet commanded by Yang manages to escape without absorbing serious damage. Fleet Admiral Lobos orders the fleets to regroup in the Amritsar Starzone. Reinhard orders his admirals to regroup in the same area in order to destroy the remaining fleets. The Free Planets Alliance Fleet suffer further losses during the battle of Amritsar Starzone (October, 15, 796 U.C. / 487 R.C.).
16	"A New Tide"; Transliteration: "Arata naru Chōryū" (Japanese: 新たなる潮流)
End of the battle of Amritsar: Yang's 13th Fleet keeps the Imperial Fleet at bay, allowing admiral Bucock to withdraw the remaining fleets. After that, Yang manages to escape destruction (once again). Meanwhile, the Kaiser dies without appointing an heir. Reinhard teams up with Reichsminister Lichtenlade in order to crown Erwin Josef II, one of the late emperor's three grandchildren. Duke von Brauschweig and Prince von Littenheim, fathers of the two others, prepare to seek revenge. Back in the Free Planets Alliance, Trüniht is appointed temporary chairman of the High Council, Bucock commander-in-chief of the Fleet, and Yang commander of Iserlohn. He takes all his staff with him, plus Attenborough and a new officer, Julian Mintz, and hopes to have Casselnes appointed as commissioner of the fortress. Meanwhile, in Fezzan, Rubinsky takes his orders from the Grand Bishop of the Terra Cult.
17	"Before the Storm"; Transliteration: "Arashi no Mae" (Japanese: 嵐の前)
Julian Mintz asks Frederica Greenhill how Yang became the "Hero of El Facil": 9 years ago. The Free Planets Alliance fleet, led by Arthur Lynch, fled the approaching Imperial Fleet, leaving 3 million people behind; Yang, one of the few officers left behind, organized the evacuation while the Alliance Fleet was defeated. Meanwhile, in the Empire, Reinhard thinks a civil war is about to break out; in order to avoid an intervention from the Alliance, he decides to infiltrate Lynch in the Alliance to stage a military coup. The move is hidden behind an exchange of 2 million prisoners of war. End of 796 U.C. / 487 R.C.
18	"The Lippstadt Agreement"; Transliteration: "Rippushutatto no Mitsuyaku" (Japanese: リップシュタットの密約)
Duke von Brauschweig and Prince von Littenheim team up to overthrow the young Kaiser and get rid of Reinhard. Count Franz von Mariendorf wants to join the conspiracy, but his daughter, Hildegard persuade him not to do so because a new order is rising under Reinhard. She goes to Reinhard and offer her family's allegiance. The high nobles create the Lippstadt League, led by Braunschweig and Littenheim; Generaladmiral von Merkatz agrees (although reluctantly) to command their military forces. April, 6, 797 U.C. / 488 R.C.: Reinhard strikes first and manages to arrest many conspirators, but Brauschweig and Littenheim flee and regroup most of their forces in the Geiersburg Fortress.
19	"The Yang Fleet Sallies Forth"; Transliteration: "Yan Kantai Shutsudō" (Japanese: ヤン艦隊出動)
Andrew Fork is released from the Hospital. Fork attempts to assassinate HQ chief Kubersly. Reinhard decides to lead the main fleet against Geiersburg while Kircheis, helped by vice-admirals Lutz and Wahlen, will take control of the other areas. Meanwhile, in the Free Planets Alliance, a military uprising begins (April 3, 797 U.C. / 488 R.C.). In Heinessen, a military coup overthrows the High Council (April, 13): the National Salvation Military Council, led by admiral Greenhill, suspends the democratic institutions. Trüniht goes into hiding. Yang decides to fight for democracy: the 13th Fleets leaves Iserlohn (April, 20) while the 11th Fleet goes out to stop it.
20	"Heavens of Bloodshed"; Transliteration: "Ryūketsu no Uchū" (Japanese: 流血の宇宙)
The Lippstadt League plans to draw Reinhard to Geiersburg in order to defeat him in a decisive battle. As a part of this plan, Admiral Staaden has to lead a fleet to Odin in order to cut Reinhard's fleet from its base. Mittermeyer is sent to intercept Staaden, whose fleet is crushed during the battle of Altener and withdraws to the Rentenberg fortress. Reinhard decides to take the fortress, but the boarding parties are repelled by the garrison, led by Generaladmiral Ovlesser. An assault led by Mittermeyer and Reuenthal succeeds, and Ovlesser is taken prisoner. Reinhard wants to execute him, but Oberstein advises to send him back to Geiersburg. Ovlesser is released, but is executed by Braunschweig who thinks he was freed because he turned against him. Fear of treason spreads among the Lippstadt League.
21	"The Battle of Doria, and Then..."; Transliteration: "Dōria Seiiki Kaisen, soshite..." (Japanese: ドーリア星域会戦、そして...)
Schönkopf takes control of the rebel planets on behalf of the Yang fleet. The National Salvation Military Council sends commodore Bagdash to Yang to pose as a traitor to the coup in order to kill him, but Schönkopf manages to take him away. Yang's 13th Fleet meets the 11th Fleet in the Doria star system; the 11th Fleet is destroyed because its commanders turn down Yang's proposal of surrender. After the battle, Bagdash decides to join Yang because his victory is certain. Meanwhile, in Heinessen, a peaceful gathering against the coup is held in a stadium. When the army tries to scatter it, it turns into a riot, and thousands are killed, including Jessica Edwards.
22	"Courage & Loyalty"; Transliteration: "Yūki to Chūsei" (Japanese: 勇気と忠誠)
Littenheim leaves Geiersburg with his fleet to recover the territories conquered by Kircheis. Because of its lack of discipline and overconfidence of its commanders, the Littenheim Fleet is defeated; while running away, Littenheim's spaceship opens fire on allies who are in the way. In the Garmisch fortress, Littenheim is killed by his men, enraged by such an attitude. Meanwhile, Reinhard's fleet arrives in the area of Geiersburg. The Lippstadt Fleet attacks him but is utterly beaten and barely avoids complete destruction thanks to admiral Merkatz.
23	"The Fall of the Goldenbaum"; Transliteration: "Ōgon-ju (Gōrudenbaumu) wa Taoreta" (Japanese: 黄金樹(ゴールデンバウム)は倒れた)
An uprising takes place in Westerland, one of Braunschweig's territories. He decides to kill all the inhabitants by a nuclear strike. Reinhard hears about the plan and wants to send a fleet to stop it, but Oberstein thinks it's better to let it happen, record it and use this monstrous act as a propaganda tool against the high nobles. Reinhard is against it, but Oberstein's plan succeeds because he lied about the time of the strike. The images are nevertheless broadcast in all the Empire: Reinhard becomes the hero of the commoners and, even in Geiersburg, many think its time to get rid of the high nobles. The Lippstadt Fleet makes a last sortie, but is defeated; baron Flegel is killed by his men when he wants to make a suicide attack, and his crew flees to Fezzan. Merkatz, too proud to surrender, decides to kill himself, but Bernhard von Schneider advises him to take refuge in Iserlohn. Braunschweig is forced to commit suicide by Ansbach, his chief retainer, who promises to avenge him. September 797 U.C. / 488 R.C.: fall of the Geiersburg fortress and end of the Lippstadt League.
24	"Victory, For Whose Sake?"; Transliteration: "Ta ga Tame no Shōri" (Japanese: 誰が為の勝利)
After Yang's victory, the National Salvation Military Council loses its supporters and only controls Heinessen, well protected by the Artemis Necklace. Yang decides to use propaganda and asks Bagdash to publicly admit that the Empire is behind the coup. Bagdash's speech is widely broadcast in Heinessen. The leaders of the coup are astonished, but Lynch, who helped them, says that's the truth. Meanwhile, Yang manages to destroy the Artemis Necklace. Hopeless, the leaders of the National Salvation Military Council decide to surrender, but to destroy all evidence of the Empire's involvement. Admiral Greenhill and Lynch are killed in the ensuing gunfight. Democracy is restored. Trüniht, hidden by members of the Terra Cult, comes back to power.
25	"The Day Before Destiny"; Transliteration: "Unmei no Zenjitsu" (Japanese: 運命の前日)
Kircheis arrives at Geiersburg. He has an argument with Reinhard about the handling of the Westerland events. Reinhard assumes full responsibility for Oberstein's actions. A message is sent from Odin: Lichtenlade is plotting to get rid of Reinhard. Reinhard receives some rebel commanders. Adalbert von Fahrenheit joins Reinhard's team. Ansbach comes in with Braunschweig's coffin, but takes out a weapon and aims at Reinhard...
26	"Farewell, Distant Days"; Transliteration: "Saraba, Tooki Hi" (Japanese: さらば、遠き日)
Ansbach misses; Oberstein protects Reinhard with his body while Kircheis grabs the weapons, but is killed in the process. Reinhard is devastated by his friend's death and is unable to make any decisions for several days. His admirals go back to Odin, arrest Reich Chancellor Lichtenlade for the murder attempt on Reinhard. Reinhard finally recovers and speaks to Annerose, who decides to retire to a small cottage; Reinhard feels left alone. Meanwhile, in Fezzan, Rubinsky decides to change his strategy, since the balance of power cannot be maintained: Fezzan will support the Empire. He sends Boltik as Fezzani high commissioner to Odin and replaces him with Rupert Kesselring.

== Series 2 ==
The 28-episode series 2 covers volumes 3 to 5 of the original novels. Reinhard von Lohengramm achieves almost all his goals: the Goldenbaum dynasty is finally overthrown and the Free Planets Alliance is defeated and occupied. One of the main themes is the comparison between a corrupt democracy and an efficient dictatorship and the moral issues of such a situation, with Yang Wen-li standing for democracy because a corrupt democracy can be amended, while a dictatorship can only be overthrown by force, and a wise dictator is an exception.

No.	Title
27	"First Battle"; Transliteration: "Uijin" (Japanese: 初陣)
January 1, 798 U.C. / 489 R.C.: Reinhard von Lohengramm is now Reich Chancellor and Supreme commander of the imperial military. He implements many reforms for the welfare of the people. Meanwhile, a training sortie, under Dusty Attenborough's command, turns out to be Julian Mintz's first battle as a fighter pilot. The Attenborough Fleet is on the verge to be crushed, but Yang Wen-li, with the help of Admiral Merkatz, goes out of Iserlohn with the whole fleet and saves the day (January, 16).
28	"Portrait"; Transliteration: "Shōzō" (Japanese: 肖像)
January, 798 U.C. / 489 R.C.: Admiral von Schaft, head of the Science and Technology Division, works out a plan to take Iserlohn back. The Geiersburg fortress is to become a mobile fortress by adding warp engines: its firepower is a match to Iserlohn's, so the Imperial fleet will be able to defeat the Iserlohn Fleet. The operation will be under Admiral Kempf's command, with Admiral Müller as second-in-command. In Fezzan, Rubinsky decides to support the plan and asks Kesselring to find a way to move Yang away from Iserlohn. Some of Mittermeyer and Reuenthal's background is revealed.
29	"One Slender Thread"; Transliteration: "Hosoi Ippon no ito" (Japanese: 細い一本の糸)
In Fezzan, Rubinsky explains his plans to a bishop of the Terra Cult. He will use his contacts in the Free Planets Alliance, such as chairman Trüniht, to make the Alliance crumble from inside, paving the way for an Imperial victory. Then, Reinhard is to be murdered. Kesselring is sent to the Alliance's commissioner in Fezzan, saying the financial support can continue only if the Alliance is a stable democracy, hinting that Yang is willing to seize power. In Iserlohn, Casselnes is concerned about Yang's safety: for the time being, his skills are needed, but he fears that Trüniht wants to dispose of him in the end. In Heinessen, Trüniht, who dislikes Yang's popularity, asks the Chairman of the Defence Committee, Negreponte, to form an inquiry committee about Yang's action during the coup.
30	"Lost Things"; Transliteration: "Ushinawareta Mono" (Japanese: 失われたもの)
Yang is summoned to Heinessen, where the Chairman of the Defence Committee is holding an inquiry. This move shocks his staff because such a committee has no legal basis. In Fezzan, Kesselring enlists two former members of the Lippstadt League, Leopold Schumacher and Alfred von Landsberg to carry out a plan we know nothing about. March 13, 798 U.C. / 489 R.C.: the test of the warp drive of the Geiersburg fortress is a success. The fortress and its supporting fleet can now move to the Iserlohn Corridor and attack the Alliance's fortress.
31	"The Inquiry"; Transliteration: "Samon Kai" (Japanese: 査問会)
On his way to Heinessen, Yang thinks about the current situation. The Alliance's disrespect for human rights, democracy and freedom on the pretense of the war is leading the nation toward its destruction; moreover, the failed invasion of the Empire and the civil war have drastically weakened the Alliance's military. In Heinessen, Yang is separated from his companions, Louis Mashengo and Frederica Greenhill. While Yang's personality and actions are questioned by the committee, Greenhill and Mashengo try to reach him, but any contact is denied. They go to Admiral Bucock for help, but are attacked by the P.K.C. (which appears to be related to the Terra Cult) and rescued by Bucock's staff. April 10, 798 U.C. / 489 R.C.: the Geiersburg Fortress enters the Iserlohn Corridor.
32	"The Battle Without Arms"; Transliteration: "Buki naki Tatakai" (Japanese: 武器なき戦い)
While the inquiry continues, Greenhill tries to find out where is Yang and discovers that the government controls the media and leaves little room for the opposition: the Free Planets Alliance is a democracy in name only. When the news of a new imperial attack reaches Heinessen, the inquiry is suspended and Yang sent back to Iserlohn. However, the journey will take at least four weeks: Yang's staff thinks about a strategy to hold on and not let the enemy know that Yang is not there.
33	"Fortress vs Fortress"; Transliteration: "Yōsai tai Yōsai" (Japanese: 要塞対要塞)
Geiersburg and Iserlohn fire at each other, causing little damage to the fortresses. After that, Schönkopf and the Rosen Ritter repel a boarding party. Kempf then decide to use the firepower of Geiersburg and the Müller Fleet to make a breach in Iserlohn's outer wall. The operation succeeds, but the Imperial forces can't get through because Admiral Merkatz launches the Iserlohn Fleet and drive off the Müller Fleet. Meanwhile, Yang is on his way back with some reinforcement. April, 15, 798 U.C. / 489 R.C.: in spite of the numerical advantage of the Imperial fleet, the situation is deadlocked. However, Müller learns from a dying prisoner of war that Yang is not in Iserlohn.
34	"The Return"; Transliteration: "Kikan" (Japanese: 帰還)
Reinhard is displeased by Kempf's report and decides to dispatch Mittermeyer and Reuenthal Fleet; he thinks the best tactics was to smash Geiersburg against Iserlohn and destroy both fortresses (Yang has the same idea). Imperial scout ships detect Yang's reinforcement fleet. Kempf plans to lure the Iserlohn Fleet out of the fortress by pretending to retreat, then strike and seal it in the fortress, which will allow him to attack the reinforcements. Julian Mintz sees through his plan. Merkatz, leading the Iserlohn fleet, pretends to fall into the trap, thus the Imperial Fleet is attacked from behind when it engages Yang's fleet. Kempf finally decides to smash Geiersburg into Iserlohn, but the Alliance's fleet targets a singular engine, which causes the fortress to move randomly, destroying many imperial ships, before blowing up. Kempf is mortally wounded in the chaos and an injured Müller promises to avenge him. The Imperial Fleet falls back but, against Yang's order, some commanders decide to pursue the Imperial Fleet.
35	"Decisions & Ambition"; Transliteration: "Ketsui to Yashin to" (Japanese: 決意と野心と)
The Mittermeyer and Reuenthal Fleets meet the retreating Imperial fleet and destroy the Alliance's pursuing ships before falling back when the Iserlohn Fleet shows up. In Odin, Müller is forgiven by Reinhard. Reinhard tells Hildegard von Mariendorf that power should not be inherited, but seized. In Fezzan, Kesselring explains to Rubinsky that the Free Planets Alliance is on the verge of bankruptcy; they decide to go on with their plan. It is revealed that Kesselring is Rubinsky's illegitimate son. Back in Iserlohn, Yang shares with Julian Mintz his thoughts about military strength and how it is often used against the citizen it was supposed to protect.
36	"Thunder"; Transliteration: "Raimei" (Japanese: 雷鳴)
Admiral Kessler, chief of the Military Police, informs Reinhard that two former members of the Lippstadt League (Landsberg and Schumacher) have arrived in Odin, and may be involved in some plot. Reinhard asks Hildegard for her advice: she thinks they are in fact sent by Fezzan and will try to abduct someone, probably the 7-year-old Kaiser. Later, she pays a visit to Annerose von Grünewald (Reinhard's elder sister) and persuades her to let Reinhard increase the security measures. Reinhard summons Boltik, the Commissioner of Fezzan, tells him he knows everything about their plan, and asks what is Fezzani interest: Boltik answers that Fezzan expects to control the space communications and trade in an unified Empire. Reinhard agrees to act according to Rubinsky's plan, only if Fezzan grants a free passage through the Fezzan Corridor to the Imperial Fleet.
37	"The Abduction of the Child Kaiser"; Transliteration: "Yōtei Yūkai" (Japanese: 幼帝誘拐)
July 6–7, 798 U.C. / 489 R.C.: Landsberg and Schumacher kidnap the young Kaiser under hidden tunnels within the palace grounds. Vice Admiral Molt commits suicide over his failure to guard the grounds and protect the Kaiser. Hildegard sees through the kidnapping and confronts Reinhard over why he allowed the kidnapping to take place. Reinhard explains he chose to not stop Fezzani plot as a method of justification for the Empire to invade the Alliance.
38	"The Arrow Is Loosed"; Transliteration: "Ya wa Hanatareta" (Japanese: 矢は放たれた)
The young Kaiser passes through Fezzan into Alliance territory. The Alliance government declares that they will shelter the refugees while the nobles announce a government in exile. Merkatz is appointed as minister of war without his own consent. August 20, 798 U.C. / 489 R.C.: Reinhard declares the government in exile kidnapped the young Kaiser in an underhanded act of cowardice. The public within the Empire mobilizes in support of Reinhard's declaration of total war.
39	"A Single Journey"; Transliteration: "Hitotsu no Tabidachi" (Japanese: ひとつの旅立ち)
Julian is assigned to Fezzan by central command. Yang and his staff decide to assign Mashengo to be Julian's body guard. Yang shares with Julian his thoughts about the possibility of Fezzan allying with the Empire due to the power balance being shifted. Julian mentions the possibility of Fezzan allying with the Empire not because of realist means, but instead out of ideological or religious reasons. Julian agrees to be of use to Yang and go to Fezzan to spy on any developments. The Iserlohn staff say their goodbyes to Julian.
40	"Julian's Journey, Mankind's Journey"; Transliteration: "Yurian no Tabi, Jinrui no Tabi" (Japanese: ユリアンの旅、人類の旅)
As Julian travels to Heinessen to accept his commission in Fezzan; he thinks about how Yang's background in history. Julian reviews the history of humanity during this long trip. The history lesson starts with the birth of the Galactic Republic in 2801 and man's continued expansion into space. The lesson then touches on space piracy, the increase in military powers, and the eventual decadence which led to the rise of the Galactic Empire. The final parts of the lesson include the creation of the Alliance up to the first military conflict between the Alliance and Empire.
41	"Operation "Ragnarok""; Transliteration: "Sakusein Mei "Kamigami no Tasogare" (Ragunarokku)" (Japanese: 作戦名「神々の黄昏(ラグナロック)」)
Admiral Bucock informs Julian that the alliance government is trying to divide Yang from his allies as a way of preventing any future power grab by Yang. Reinhard discusses his plans on using the Fezzan corridor with his admirals, calling the plan Operation Ragnarok. Over one million ships are planned to be in the fleet. Reinhart speaks with Oberstein and discuss the use and eventually the expendability of Boltik, current Commissioner of Fezzan. Oberstein creates a secret police with Lang as the leader. September 20, 798 U.C. / 489 R.C.: 8 month old Katharin Kätchen succeeds the imperial throne as the new Kaiserin.
42	"Invitation to a Requiem"; Transliteration: "Chinkonkyoku (Rekuiemu) e no Shōtai" (Japanese: 鎮魂曲(レクイエム)への招待)
Julian arrives on Fezzan. The next evening, he attends his welcome party. Julian spreads conjecture about a possible invasion of Fezzan from the Empire. Reinhart organizes his fleet for operation Ragnarok. Admiral Bucock tries to warn the defence committee about a possible Fezzan corridor attack, but is ignored. November 20, 798 U.C. / 489 R.C.: Generaladmiral Reuenthal leading an Imperial Fleet of 36,000 ships lays siege to Iserlohn. Carrying out the first part of Operation Ragnarok.
43	"The Gjallarhorn is Sounded"; Transliteration: "Gyararuhorun wa Natta" (Japanese: ギャラルホルンは鳴った)
Reuenthal plans a war of attrition against Iserlohn. Reuenthal sees the Hyperion, Yang's flagship, emerge from port and decides to rush his fleet to destroy the Hyperion. However this is a feint and the Rosen Ritter led by Schönkopf latch on to Reuenthal's flagship and engage in combat. The battle is a draw and Schönkopf eventually withdraws. Reuenthal returns to his plan of attrition by rotating his attack forces in small groups. December 9, 798 U.C. / 489 R.C.: Part two of Operation Ragnarok launches from the Empire homeworld.
44	"The Fezzan Occupation"; Transliteration: "Fezān Senryō" (Japanese: フェザーン占領)
The Imperial fleet under Mittermeyer invades Fezzan after feigning to approach Iserlohn. Kesselring tries to kill Rubinsky, but Rubinsky had a trap laid out and kills Kesselring instead. Rubinsky goes into hiding. Julian and Mashengo destroy the computers in the Alliance High commissioner's office. Julian later finds a smuggler to take him, Mashengo, and the cowardly Alliance commissioner out of Fezzan space. Mittermeyer orders the execution of soldiers which raped and robbed civilians. The Empire secures Alliance space maps from the Fezzan Navigation Office.
45	"The Cold Wave Arrives"; Transliteration: "Kanpa Itaru" (Japanese: 寒波至る)
Reinhard celebrates the new year with his officers. The citizens on Heinessen panic and question the government's handling of the situation. Admiral Bucock is chosen to lead the defense of the Alliance. The Alliance situation is dire as the fleets are greatly weakened from past campaigns, the only intact fleet is the 1st fleet. The 14th and 15th fleet are then created from a hodgepodge of 20,000 ships from around the Alliance. The military leaders of the Alliance realize however, they do not have enough ships to block the exit of the Fezzan corridor. Yang is given free rein over any future actions for the 13th fleet. January 8, 799 U.C. / 490 R.C.: The first Imperial fleet, led by Mittermeyer passes through the Fezzan corridor into Alliance territory.
46	"Admiral Yang's Ark Fleet"; Transliteration: "Yan Teitoku no Hakobune Tai" (Japanese: ヤン提督の箱舟隊)
On Iserlohn Yang decides to abandon the fortress. Yang realizes that the fortress no longer has strategic value as a choke point defense after the Imperial fleet has broken through Fezzan space. Furthermore, the Fortress would be able to hold out till the end of the war, but would probably be forced back into Empire territory in the event of a peace treaty. Yang's fleet prepares bombs and another surprise on Iserlohn and abandons the fortress of all staff and civilians. January 9, 799 U.C. / 490 Reuenthal has retaken Iserlohn fortess.
47	"Seeking a Free Universe"; Transliteration: "Jiyū no Uchū o Motomete" (Japanese: 自由の宇宙を求めて)
Julian and friends leave Fezzan on a cargo ship. Julian tricks the captain of an Imperial destroyer and captures the destroyer. Reinhard organizes and briefs his fleet on the invasion plan. The Imperial fleet has a 3 to 1 fleet number advantage over the hodgepodge fleet of the Alliance. The Imperial and Alliance fleets are days away from a battle in the uninhabited Rantemario star system.
48	"The Double-Headed Serpent: Showdown at Rantemario"; Transliteration: "Sōtō no Hebi ~ Rantemario no Kessen ~" (Japanese: 双頭の蛇〜ランテマリオの決戦〜)
The Imperial fleet takes a serpent formation as they approach the Rantemario system. Bucock fleet is forced to attack the center of the snake formation as their only plausible tactical response. The Alliance fleet is badly damaged as the much larger Imperial fleet closes in on all sides. Bucock tries to minimize losses to the Alliance fleet by using a space current to slow down the Empire's advance and disabling enemy engines with fighters. At the last moment Yang's fleet approaches from behind, stopping the total destruction of the Alliance fleet under Bucock. The Imperial fleet reorganizes their fleet and heads for next Alliance system. Julian's destroyer joins up with the Alliance fleet at Heinessen.
49	"It's Always Darkest..."; Transliteration: "Yami ga Fukaku naru no ha" (Japanese: 闇が深くなるのは...)
Yang is promoted to Fleet Admiral as he lands on Heinessen. Yang clarifies his war plan to the government of the Alliance. The war plan is to attack the spread out Imperial fleet and lure out Reinhard. If Reinhard is killed, his admirals will lose their unifying force, potentially causing infighting. Julian and Yang go out to dinner and catch up on the events which have happened in the last few months. Merkatz leads the exile Imperial government fleet to join with Yang's. Reinhard has a flu and thinks of the past. The end of February, 799 U.C. / 490 R.C.: The unified Alliance fleet launches from Heinessen.
50	"Consecutive Battles"; Transliteration: "Rensen" (Japanese: 連戦)
Yang attacks the supply lines of the Imperial fleet successfully. Next, Yang defeats a fleet near a black hole. Reinhard's anger at these losses are reaching boiling point. Mittermeyer and Reuenthal realize that they will have to launch a large offensive versus Yang if they hope to win before morale and food drops to dangerous levels. Yang defeats another fleet by filling supply pods with helium, then igniting the pods when the Imperial fleet nears them for pick up. Yang's guerrilla warfare tactics leave the Imperial fleet with uncertainty on where Yang will appear next. An attack on Heinessen is vetoed by both the Imperial Generaladmirals and Reinhard. The only remaining option is a full fleet encounter by using Reinhard as bait.
51	"Mortal Combat at Vermillion (Part One)"; Transliteration: "Bāmirion no shitō (zenpen)" (Japanese: バーミリオンの死闘(前編))
Yang announces R&R time before the final battle. Julian and Yang discuss the differing battle goals for both sides. The Alliance needs to kill Reinhard while the Empire needs to hold out long enough for reinforcements to trap the Alliance. Yang finally reciprocates Frederica's feelings and proposes marriage after the war is over. Frederica is thrilled at the idea. It is revealed that Yang felt a large amount of guilt at pursuing familial happiness with all the deaths he has caused. Both fleets engage each other cautiously; both sides suspect traps or tricks from the other.
52	"Mortal Combat at Vermillion (Part Two)"; Transliteration: "Bāmirion no shitō (kōhen)" (Japanese: バーミリオンの死闘(後編))
Yang organizes his fleet for a blitzkrieg directly at Reinhard's flagship, Brünhild. Reinhard divides his fleet into multiple layers of ships, providing a rotation for each broken layer. Ivan Konev is killed in battle when his strike craft is lured into cruiser fire. Yang realizes that it has become an issue of endurance if Reinhard's fleet is continuously reforming the front line. The Alliance fleet tricks Reinhard's front line into entering an asteroid field. Reinhard is divided from his main force as that group is surrounded by Yang's fleet. Müller's fleet is the first to return, rescuing the Brünhild and acting as a shield.
53	"A Sudden Turn"; Transliteration: "Kyūten" (Japanese: 急転)
Yang's fleet nears firing range of the Brünhild, but a message from Heinessen declares a ceasefire. During the battle of Vermillion, Hildegard had convinced Mittermeyer fleet to take Heinessen. Hildegard is wary of Reuenthal's ambitions, but has Mittermeyer convince Reuenthal to join the Heinessen attack. In Hildegard's judgement, the battle of Vermillion would have concluded in Reinhard's death before the other fleets could return in time. Trüniht plans to surrender, while the other members of the Alliance government would prefer to fight and die. During the meeting, armed Terra Cult members rescue Trüniht. The surrender of the Alliance has divided Yang's staff, some preferring to ignore orders and kill Reinhard while others grudgingly accept the ceasefire. It is decided that a portion of Yang's staff will escape with Admiral Merkatz to a life of piracy.
54	"Sieg Kaiser!"; Transliteration: "Kōtei Banzai! (Jīku Kaizā)" (Japanese: 皇帝ばんざい!(ジーク·カイザー))
Yang boards the Brünhild and meets with Reinhard. Yang declines an offer by Reinhard to the position of Imperial Grand Admiral, instead preferring to retire to a quiet life. Reinhard and Yang discuss government and philosophy. The treaty of Barlat is announced, formally ending hostilities. The concessions within the treaty increase civil unrest, public anger turns from the Empire to former Chairman Trüniht. Admiral Rennenkampf is appointed Imperial high commissioner to Heinessen. Julian, Mashengo, and Boris Konev prepare to visit Terra. June 20, 799 U.C. / 490 R.C.: Duke von Pegnitz, the regent of the young Kaiserin, signs a declaration abdicating the throne to Reinhard. Beginning of the New Empire; year 1 of the Neue Reich Calendar (N.R.C.).

== Series 3 ==
The 32-episode series 3 covers volumes 6 to 8 of the original novels.

No.	Title
55	"After the Ceremony, the Curtain Rises Once Again..."; Transliteration: "Gishiki kara futatabi Maku wa Agari" (Japanese: 儀式から再び幕は上がり...)
Kaiser Reinhard celebrates with his staff and focuses on the organization of domestic positions and issues within the Empire. Meanwhile Frederica and Yang marry and enjoy their private time. The Imperial government keeps an eye on Yang's new life, but does not interfere. Julian and Mashengo arrive at Merkatz's secret base. The Merkatz fleet is only 60 ships, but they plan to procure more from raids and decommissioned Alliance ships. Julian meets Katerose von Kreutzer for the first time. Poplin joins Julian's group to Terra. Till the fleet is needed once again, Merkatz plans to maintain and safeguard it.
56	"To Terra"; Transliteration: "Chikyū e" (Japanese: 地球へ)
On the long trip to Terra, Julian and Poplin review the history of Terra. The lesson starts with the 13 Day War between Terra factions in 2039 AD. After the nuclear exchange, the unification of all governments on Terra occurs in 2129 AD. Following unification man expands into the stars. However, the lack of autonomy to colonies, unequal economic polities, and tyranny from the Terra government culminate in multiple conflicts and human rights violations. The end of these chaotic conflicts eventually leads to the creation of the Galactic Republic in 2801 and Terra being forgotten.
57	"The Kümmel Incident"; Transliteration: "Kyunmeru Jiken" (Japanese: キュンメル事件)
Kaiser Reinhard announces his new cabinet. Through a personal favor to Hildegard's father, the new Reichsminister, Reinhard agrees to visit Künmel. During the lunch, it is revealed that Kümmel and the Terra cult had placed explosives under the court. Trüniht leaks information to the chief of military police Kesler; an assassination attempt is planned on Reinhard. The Terra cultists around Odin are attacked in full force by the military police. Reinhard disables the trigger, via Kümmel complacency. The Mariendorfs are put under house arrest. July 10, 799 U.C. / 1 N.R.C.: Julian crew arrives on Terra, that same day the Empire decides to suppress Terra by force.
58	"Visitors"; Transliteration: "Hōmonsha" (Japanese: 訪問者)
Oberstein confronts Reinhard to choose a consort for bearing an heir. Reinhard releases Hildegard and her father from house arrest. Reuenthal reveals to Mittermeyer that his personal demons are affecting his lifestyle. At this time Reuenthal also gives up his ambition for power, realizing he can not exceed Reinhard. Wahlen launches his fleet from Odin towards Terra. Julian, Mashengo, and Poplin arrive on Terra and head to the Terra Cult holy temple.
59	"The Past, the Present & the Future"; Transliteration: "Kako to Genzai to Mirai to" (Japanese: 過去と現在と未来と)
On Odin, Reinhard reviews the secret history of the past Kaisers of the Empire. On Heinessen Yang is enjoying his private life. Rennenkampf is uneasy with Yang's quiet life, being vigilant he increases surveillance. Fredrica decides to learn how to cook better for Yang, she consults Cazellnu's wife. During this period, both women realized they can trade information inside the food.
60	"The Magician Is Captured"; Transliteration: "Majutsushi Torawaru" (Japanese: 魔術師捕らわる)
July 17, 799 U.C. / 1 N.R.C.: Alliance forces in accordance with the Treaty of Barlat start decommissioning and disassembling Alliance cruisers and carriers. The Merkatz freedom fighter fleet launches a sneak attack on the Imperial flagship, causing many planned decommissioned soldiers and ships to switch sides. Oberstein tricks Rennenkampf into blaming Yang. Yang is arrested in his home by Alliance soldiers. All of Yang's subordinates notice increased surveillance as a sign of danger. If Yang is executed by the Empire, it would cause a popular uprising in the Alliance. The uprising would thus give the Empire a reason to subjugate the Alliance further. The Alliance government thus considers executing Yang before the Empire, to avoid interference or subjugation.
61	"Invitation to an Opera"; Transliteration: "Kageki (opera) e no Shōtai" (Japanese: 歌劇(オペラ)への招待)
High Chairman Lebello visits Yang in prison. Yang realizes he will be used as a scapegoat by the Alliance to avoid Imperial intervention. Schönkopf and Attenborough reorganize Yang's subordinates. With the Rosen Ritter in full rebellion, the Alliance troops are no match for the difference in battle experience and morale. During the chaos, the Rosen Ritter kidnaps the High Chairman. However, the Alliance military decides to sacrifice the PM and execute Yang early. Frederica and Schönkopf save Yang at the last moment, escaping with Yang's staff into the night.
62	"A Cascade of Blood"; Transliteration: "Chi no Ryūsui Kaidan (Kasukēdo)" (Japanese: 血の流水階段(カスケード))
July 22, 799 U.C. / 1 N.R.C.:The turmoil on Heinessen expands. Yang debates Lebello on the state of the nation. Lebello agrees to exchange his freedom for Rennenkampf. The Rosen Ritter infiltrate the Imperial Consulate, kidnapping Rennenkampf and causing massive casualties on the Imperial side. While in captivity Rennenkampf hangs himself, too ashamed to live. Fredrica applies make up to Rennenkampf's corpse, tricking the Imperials. Cazellnu resigns his post in the Alliance government and joins Yang's fleet with his family.
63	"The Holy Land"; Transliteration: "Seichi" (Japanese: 聖地)
The Wahlen Imperial fleet arrives near Terra orbit. An Terra Cultist within Wahlen's flagship attacks Wahlen with a poisoned blade. Wahlen's arm is amputated and he goes into a coma. Meanwhile, Julian and Poplin realize the food being served to cultists has minute amounts of Thyoxin, a mind control poison. Julian goes through withdrawal symptoms, and meets up with the others in the infirmary. Wahlen awakens from his coma and orders a ground assault and missile bombardments of the Terraism fortress. The Imperial forces and Julian's friends (Posing as Fezzan infiltrators.) work together against the Terra Cultists. Julian and the others escape with the Terraism data while the cultists detonate the Terra cult fortress.
64	"The Holiday is Done"; Transliteration: "Kyūka wa Owarinu" (Japanese: 休暇は終わりぬ)
Julian convinces Wahlan to escort him to Odin. The Imperial admirals discuss the issue of Rennenkampf's capture and the unverified accusations against Yang. Oberstein argues that the subterfuge within Heinessen could be very advantageous to the Empire. The admirals all reject Oberstein's conclusion and opportunism, preferring to investigate the plot for the truth. Yang's fleet heads towards Merkatz's base. During this trip, Yang considers the miscalculations leading up to his capture as well as the next steps needed. Reinhard formalizes his plan of moving the Imperial capital to Fezzan. August 13, 799 U.C. / 1 N.R.C.: Planet El Facil declares independence from the Empire and Alliance.
65	"Against All Flags"; Transliteration: "Subete no Hata ni Somuite" (Japanese: すべての旗に背いて)
Rumors spread around the Alliance on the whereabouts of Yang and Rennenkampf. El Facil, the only independent planet not under Imperial supervision, aggressively tries to recruit Yang. Yang decides to remain on the sidelines. The reasoning behind's Yang's caution is due to the Yang fleet not having enough military power to protect El Facil or any other systems. Yang decides his next action depends heavily on the Empire's next move. On Heinessen, Lebello considers the possibility of Yang allying with the Empire for revenge as well as asking Yang to return and lead the Alliance. Reinhard receives a report on the truth behind Yang's movements and Rennenkampf's actions. Reinhard summons his three top Imperial Military commanders...
66	"Under the Flag of the Goldenlöwe"; Transliteration: "Ōgon Shishi Ki (Gōrudenrūve) no Moto ni" (Japanese: 黄金獅子旗(ゴールデンルーヴェ)の下に)
Reinhard considers the possibility of Yang joining the Empire. Hildegard considers the different power groups at play. The current balance of power is divided between the Empire, the Alliance, Yang, El Facil, Fezzani merchants, Terra Cultists, and Goldenbaum loyalists. Yang is seen as a possible unifier of the Alliance, El Facil, and Fezzani merchants. Meanwhile Silverberche, the Imperial Chairman of Industry starts construction of the new Imperial capital in Fezzan. During a high level staff meeting, Reinhard decides that the Galactic unification of humanity is vital.
67	"Ragnarok once More"; Transliteration: "Kamigami no tasogare (Ragunaroku) Futatabi" (Japanese: 「神々の黄昏(ラグナロック)」ふたたび)
Reinhard announces the situation to all citizens within the galaxy. Reinhard covers the failure of Rennenkampf and the selling out of Yang and Rennenkampf by the Alliance government. He further declares Treaty of Barlat's spirit has been desecrated with the only solution being force. Yang realizes that he has been cut off from allying himself with the Alliance government. Bucock returns from retirement. The next day, Reinhard announces the fleet organization for the second Ragnarok operation. Alliance diplomat Odets desperately heads into Imperial territory to ask for a ceasefire.
68	"To El Facil"; Transliteration: "Eru Fashiru e" (Japanese: エル·ファシルへ)
On Odin, Julian and friends prepare to leave the planet. Alliance Chief of Staff Trung Yu Chan prepares to send Yang supplies, ships, and personnel. Around the Alliance, the military is sending Yang all of their extra personal, ships, and supplies. Yang consults with his staff, considering asking Fezzani merchants for war funding. Yang's fleet finally decides to go to El Facil. The government on El Facil plans to declare a new legitimate democratic government.
69	"The Mission to Retake Iserlohn"; Transliteration: "Izerurōn Sai Dasshu Sakusen" (Japanese: イゼルローン再奪取作戦)
The Imperial forces head deeper into Alliance territory. Julian and friends arrive on El Facil. Julian passes off the Terraism data disk to Yang. Yang and staff discuss the next step, namely the retaking of Iserlohn Fortress. The El Facil government is wary of Yang being outside of their field of control, thus they refuse to let Yang lead the next operation. Effectively Yang has become a bargaining chip for controlling the excesses of his subordinates. Yang speaks with Konev about the possibility of Fezzani aid. December, 799 U.C. / 1 N.R.C.: The El Facil fleet, under Merkatz, launches for Iserlohn. During the same time, the last of the Alliance fleet launches for their final sortie.
70	"The Prodigal Sons Return"; Transliteration: "Tōjitachi no Kitaku" (Japanese: 蕩児たちの帰宅)
All military campaigns for both the Alliance and Empire are put on hold to celebrate the new year. Admiral Lutz starts receiving multiple conflicting launch and Iserlohn defense orders. Reinhard is furious at Lutz's refusal to launch. Lutz finally launches with all his forces, hoping to sandwich the El Facil fleet between him and Thor's Hammer. The Rosen Ritter disable the Thor's Hammer with a previously encoded computer lock down code. The enemy infantry forces are superior in numbers, but not in skill or morale. The Rossen Ritter eventually enter a backup control room and fire the Hammer at Lutz's returning fleet. January 14th, 800 U.C. / 2 N.R.C.: Iserlohn is once again under Yang's control.
71	"The Battle of Marr-Adetta Stellar Region (Part One)"; Transliteration: "Maru Adetta Seiiki no Kaisen (zenpen)" (Japanese: マル·アデッタ星域の会戦(前編))
The Imperial fleet decides to accept Bucock's challenge head on and sends most their ships to meet in the Marr-Adetta system. The Marr-Adetta has unstable solar activity, communication jamming and a corridor through an asteroid belt. The Bucock fleet hides in the large corridor. As the Imperial fleets charge in, they are greeted by unstable asteroids, artillery ship fire, and space mines. The Alliance fleet is astute and attacks from unexpected areas within and behind the belt. January 16th, 800 U.C. / 2 N.R.C.: The Imperial fleet is in the middle of an unexpectedly difficult battle.
72	"The Battle of Marr-Adetta Stellar Region (Part Two)"; Transliteration: "Maru Adetta Seiiki no Kaisen (kōhen)" (Japanese: マル·アデッタ星域の会戦(後編))
Bucock's fleet advances through the Müller fleet while being pursued and surrounded by many others. Bucock's Alliance fleet is unable to charge and kill Rienhard. Hilde advises Reinhard to offer surrender to Bucock. Instead of accepting defeat, the Alliance officers toast to friendship and democracy. Afterwards, the Imperial fleet decimates all remaining Alliance ships. The Imperial victory celebration is cut short when news of Lutz's defeat at Iserlohn is received. The situation has changed for the Imperials if the plan was coordinated. The Imperial fleet would have cut off supply lines if Fezzan fell as well. With that possibility, Reinhard could have underestimated the importance of Iserlohn. Countering the panic, Hilde points out Yang would not have sacrificed his allies for a stall. The Imperial forces thus resumes their course for Heinessen.
73	"The Winter Rose Garden Edict"; Transliteration: "Fuyu Bara En no Chokurei" (Japanese: 冬バラ園の勅令)
The news of Fleet Admiral Bucock's death reaches Iserlohn. The Yang declares a mourning period for Bucock. Lebello is assassinated by his subordinates. The Alliance government surrenders unconditionally. On February 9th, Reinhard lands on Heinessen. The Imperial soldiers discover low level bureaucrats unwilling to surrender public documents, records, or property to the Empire. Reinhard commends on how the Alliance perished precisely because such remarkable government servants were kept below positions of governance. Reinhard disgusted over treachery, then declares death upon Lebello's killers. February 20th, 800 U.C. / 2 N.R.C.: The 273 history of the Free Planets Alliance ended.
74	"The Long Road Ahead"; Transliteration: "Zentoryōen" (Japanese: 前途遼遠)
Reinhard considers when and how to take El Facil and Iserlohn. Yang considers the position of his forces. Katerose von Kreutzer confronts her illegitimate father, General Schönkopf. The Iserlohn reviews the Terraism data disk, discovering troublesome information: Fezzan and the Terra Cult have been working together for over a century. Yang, Frederica, and Julian talk about the role of military within government as well as Reinhard's next step. In a secret location, Rubinsky discusses his influence and agents. Meanwhile, within Reinhard's office, a letter arrives which postpones the expedition to Iserlohn.
75	"Rolling Thunder"; Transliteration: "Raidō" (Japanese: 雷動)
Reuenthal is arrested by the Imperial police under suspicion of overthrowing Reinhard. It is revealed that Lang, the head of the secret police initialed the investigation. Reuenthal is accused of harboring a woman of the exiled Lichtenlade family. Oberstein is suspicious of Lang's intentions. It is revealed that the woman is pregnant with Reuenthal's child. Reuenthal is granted a hearing from Reinhard that very afternoon. Reinhard and Reuenthal reminisce on the past. The Imperial officers direct their hatred toward Oberstein.
76	"Before the Festival"; Transliteration: "Matsuri no Mae" (Japanese: 祭りの前)
Wahlan, Mecklinger, and Kesler discuss the security and happenings of the old Imperial territories. A huge fire breaks out on Heinessen, causing massive property damage and casualties. Through Reuenthal's meticulously planned emergency countermeasures, the situation is handled efficiently. The Patriotic Knights Corps are made scapegoats for the fire. Reuenthal is relieved of his position as Chief of the High Command and made Governor General of all previous Alliance territories. Rubinsky plans to an assassination attempt at Grand Duchess Grünewald, Reinhard's sister. March 23, 800 U.C. / 2 N.R.C.: Admirals Bittenfeld and Fahrenheit lead their fleets to secure space around Iserlohn.
77	"The Wind Blows Towards the Corridor"; Transliteration: "Kaze wa Kairō e" (Japanese: 風は回廊へ)
Reinhard and his senior staff launch from Heinessen and head towards Iserlohn. On Fezzan, a terrorist bombing occurs during a celebration. Silverberche is killed while Oberstein and Lutz suffer minor injuries. The Imperial plan to attack Iserlohn is not postponed. On Heinessen, Andrew Fork is kidnapped by the Terra Cult. On the front lines, Fahrenheit and Bittenfeld kill time.
78	"Spring Storm"; Transliteration: "Haru no Arashi" (Japanese: 春の嵐)
Bittenfeld sends Iserlohn a message, advising Yang to surrender. The government of El Facil retreats to Iserlohn. Julian and Katerose have an argument. Yang and Julian discuss their situation, talking till sunrise. The Terra Cult convinces Fork to try to assassinate Yang. Iserlohn responds to Bittenfeld, planning to provoke him to attack prematurely before the main Imperial fleets arrive.
79	"The Battle of the Corridor (Part One) ~ the Invincible & the Undefeated"; Transliteration: "Kairō no Tatakai (zenpen) ~Jōshō to Fuhai to~" (Japanese: 回廊の戦い(前編)〜常勝と不敗と〜)
Bittenfeld is wary of the message and takes a cautious fleet formation. Yang takes advantage of the communications jamming between both sides of the corridor and tricks Mecklinger into withdrawing to the entrance of the Imperial side. The Bittenfeld fleet is lured into the corridor by Attenborough's fleet. Fahrenheit's fleet follows Bittenfeld, planning to overwhelm the Yang with numbers. Yang uses the superior numbers of the Imperials against them, forcing the Imperials to cluster together inside the tight corridor. High Admiral Fahrenheit is killed in battle preventing the complete destruction of the two Imperial fleets.
80	"The Battle of the Corridor (Part Two) ~ Kaleidoscope ~"; Transliteration: "Kairō no Tatakai (chūhen) ~Bankakyō (Kareidosukōpu)~" (Japanese: 回廊の戦い(中編)〜万華鏡(カレイドスコープ)〜)
Attenborough's fleet lines the entrance of the corridor with mines. He plans to snipe the Imperial fleet as they come through small holes within the minefield. The Imperial fleet creates 5 entry holes through the minefield to establish a bridgehead. Steinmetz is killed in battle. The Imperial fleet movements are sluggish within the corridor. Reuenthal orders the Imperial fleet to feign a retreat. The Yang fleet approaches the Reinhard's flagship but is unable to penetrate the battle line. Both sides withdraw.
81	"The Battle of the Corridor (Part Three) ~ The End of the Great Campaign ~"; Transliteration: "Kairō no Tatakai (kōhen) ~Dai Shinsei no Shūmaku" (Japanese: 回廊の戦い(後編)〜大親征の終幕〜)
The Imperial fleets adopt a tactic of attrition via rotations. The Müller fleet, Mittermeyer's subordinates, Bittenfeld and many other admirals rotate on the battle line. Yang's fleet, with less than 20,000 ships left fights on with no rotations in manpower. Bittenfeld's elite troops cause a fatal blow to Yang's fleet, though the imperial forces do not realize this at the time. Admiral Fischer, the one in charge of Yang's fleet maneuvers is killed in battle. Reinhard passes out from sickness. Both sides retreat, and Kaiser Rienhard sends a message to begin negotiations of a ceasefire. The Yang fleet passes out in Iserlohn.
82	"The Magician Never Returns"; Transliteration: "Majutsushi, Kaerazu" (Japanese: 魔術師、還らず)
Reinhard confides in Hildegard that his memories of Kircheis motivated him towards ceasefire talks. Yang discusses the situation with his staff. The death of Fischer basically cut off the legs from Yang's fleet. Yang decides to accept the ceasefire talks. Yang leaves Iserlohn with minimal military personnel and the politicians from El Facil. Fork's ship finds Yang's ship en route to the Imperial fleet. Behind Fork two Imperial destroyers fire on Fork, killing him. Back on Iserlohn, the crew receives word of an assassination attempt by Fork. The Imperial ships requests a meeting with Yang. The crew behind the ships are in reality Terra Cultists in disguise. Patrichev and many others are killed defending Yang. Schönkopf with his Rosen Ritter (and Julian) arrive on Yang's ship. Yang is shot in the leg through the femoral artery. June 1st, 800 U.C. / 2 N.R.C.: Yang Wen-li dies from blood loss at the age of 33.
83	"After the Festival"; Transliteration: "Matsuri no ato" (Japanese: 祭りの後)
Julian finds Yang's body. The Yang staff return to Iserlohn. The crew of Iserlohn enter mourning. Julian tells Frederica about Yang's death. It is decided by Yang's remaining staff that Frederica will assume the role of political leader. Julian is considered to be the next military leader. Julian accepts the role of military leadership after talking with Frederica. Unrest within Iserlohn grows and there is talk of desertion. Admiral Murai speaks with Julian and gives him his resignation. Murai intends to fulfill his last task for Yang by taking all dissidents from Iserlohn with him as a desertion leader. The remaining leaders of El Facil abandon the Yang fleet.
84	"A Disappointing Triumph"; Transliteration: "Shitsui no Gaisen" (Japanese: 失意の凱旋)
Reinhard is devastated at the death of Yang. Müller is sent as official Imperial envoy in condolences for Yang's death. Mittermeyer and Reuenthal discuss Yang's death and the new peace. Reinhard while sick, continues autocratic reforms. Reinhard is regretful of Silverberche's death. Hildegard, being in a military position is not able to cross over to domestic political advice. Reinhard realizes that outside of himself, Hildegard, and Silverberche, there is not anyone with skill in politics equal to his admirals in military affairs.
85	"The Order to Transfer the Capital"; Transliteration: "Sento Rei" (Japanese: 遷都令)
Lang finds the terrorists that bombed and killed Silverberche via a tip from Rubinsky. Rubinsky convinces Lang to kill Nikolas Boltik on suspicion of killing Silberberche. Many admirals within the Imperial Military are wary of Lang's influence. It is revealed that Rubinsky has Elfriede von Kohlrausch, the mother of Reuenthal's child. Reinhard officially orders all government servants and their families to move to Fezzan, the new Imperial capital. Trünicht accepts an outrageous joke position from Reinhard in Heinessen. Oberstein considers purging members of the Reinhard staff.
86	"New Government in August"; Transliteration: "Hachigatsu no Shin Seifu (Nyū Gabamento in Ōgasuta)" (Japanese: 8月の新政府(ニュー·ガバメント·イン·オーガスタ))
The last of the deserters leave Iserlohn. Reuenthal appoints many government officials as he settles as the new governor of the old alliance territories. Reuenthal plans to execute Trünicht for any suspicious actions. Fezzani merchants notice Terra cultists entering Trünicht's home. Julian ponders how Yang became the personification of the spirit of democracy. Julian also realizes that he must ironically acknowledge the effectiveness of terrorism in history to shape Yang's death into something practical. Katerose and Julian talk about Fredrica. On August 8th, Universal Calendar 800, Neue Reich Year 2, the Iserlohn republic is born. The population comparison is 40 billion in the Empire to 940,000 in Iserlohn.

== Series 4 ==
The 24-episodes series 4 covers volumes 9 and 10 of the original novels.

No.	Title
87	"Premonition of a Storm"; Transliteration: "Arashi no Yokan" (Japanese: 嵐の予感)
As if to escape the feelings of his rival's death, Reinhard works industriously in administrative tasks. In the rain, Reinhard ponders the pact he made with Kircheis and Reuenthal during a storm. At that time, Reuenthal had asked Reinhard's help in freeing Mittermeyer from nobles using their influence to kill him. Mittermeyer had executed a noble born soldier for killing and looting. On Heinessen, Reuenthal does swift moves to clean out corrupt ex-alliance politicians and military industry owners. Reuenthal feels that cleaning out corruption helps justify his rule in Heinessen. Mittermeyer meets his wife Evangelin at the space port.
88	"On the Frontier"; Transliteration: "Henkyō nite" (Japanese: 辺境にて)
Julian ponders his next step. Julian speaks with Katerose around the Iserlohn park. The fleet in Iserlohn work hard and keep training for any future military conflicts. Julian considers a plan of pushing the Empire towards constitutional government. Boris Konev arrives with supplies from Heinessen. He points out that Trünicht is conspiring with Terraists. Frederica remembers the history of her relationship with Yang and lets go of regrets.
89	"The Last Roses of Summer"; Transliteration: "Natsu no Owari no Bara" (Japanese: 夏の終わりのバラ)
While commemorating a cemetery to the Imperial war fleet, an assassination attempt is made on Reinhard. It is revealed that the assassin's family was killed in the nuclear strike on Westerland during the Lippstadt conflict. Reinhard is shaken to the core by his own guilt and inaction during that time. Reinhard asks Hildegard to spend the night with him. The next morning Hildegard goes home to her estate flustered. Reinhard visits the Mariendorf estate, asking for Hilde's hand in marriage. Hildegard is unsure of his feelings towards her, thinking his actions may be due to Reinhard's own sense of obligation.
90	"Rumbling"; Transliteration: "Meidō" (Japanese: 鳴動)
A large memorial service by the former Alliance government turns into a bloody riot with around 5000 killed and the number of injured exceeding 50,000. Reuenthal looks for the instigators of the riot. A anonymous tip warns that Trüniht is responsible for the violence now spreading from the memorial service to all parts of Neue land territory. Reuenthal orders a blockade outside of Iserlohn. On Iserlohn, Julian and Katerose become closer. Meanwhile, Terraists plan to turn Reinhard into a tyrant by provoking Reuenthal to betray Reinhard. If Reinhard became a tyrant, it would increase public unrest and give Terraism as a religion a chance to gain mass appeal.
91	"Germination"; Transliteration: "Hatsuga" (Japanese: 発芽)
Reinhard is bored of his administrative duties and branches out to the arts in his free time. Lang and Rubinsky meet and discuss plans to provoke Reuenthal's betrayal of Reinhard. On Fezzan, rumors about an assassination attempt by Reuenthal on Reinhard spread. The rumors suggest that Reuenthal will invite Reinhard to Heinessen for an assassination attempt. Oberstein discovers Lang has been meeting with Rubinsky, but takes no actions. Reuenthal decides to test Reinhard's belief in the rumors, effectively inviting Reinhard as the rumors suggest. Reinhard accepts the invitation to Heinessen. Mittermeyer, Lutz, and many other admirals discuss the possible outcomes of the invitation and preemptively plan their positions.
92	"The Uruvashi Incident"; Transliteration: "Uruvashī Jiken" (Japanese: ウルヴァシー事件)
Julian answers complaints on Iserlohn. Reinhard visits many locations on Uruvashi. That evening the guards around the guest house act erratically. Lutz, Müller, and Reinhard's personal guards escape via car with a battalion of soldiers in pursuit. In the woods, the Reinhard entourage is attacked by soldiers and snipers. Eventually they meet up with the flagship Brünhild. High Admiral Lutz stays behind to hold off the soldiers and is killed. Konev brings news of Reinhard escaping Uruvashi with only a single ship. Merkatz advises Julian on Reuenthal possible plans.
93	"In the Name of Pride"; Transliteration: "Kyōji ni kakete" (Japanese: 矜持にかけて)
Word of civil unrest and the assassination attempt reaches Reuenthal and he orders his subordinates to restore order and find Reinhard. Grillpalzer hides evidence of Terraists on Uruvashi. Reuenthal considers visiting Fezzan and asking for Reinhard's understanding, but he realizes he risks assassination himself from Lang. When news of Lutz's death reaches Reuenthal, Reuenthal realizes the circumstances have forced him to take on the role of traitor. Even if Reuenthal had not planned the attempt, he still failed to ensure Reinhard's safety. Out of respect for Reinhard, Reuenthal decides to act with all his abilities against him. Reuenthal offers the remaining republicans in Iserlohn the old Alliance territory if they can blockade Imperial reinforcements from that corridor, which would prevent a two front battle for Reuenthal.
94	"Rebellion Is a Hero's Privilege"; Transliteration: "Hangyaku wa Eiyū no Tokken" (Japanese: 叛逆は英雄の特権)
Mittermeyer tries to convince Reinhard to exercise restraint. That same day, a letter from Reuenthal explains the danger of Lang, but ignores Reinhard. The letter's presumption of Reinhard being controlled by Lang and Oberstein infuriates Reinhard. Mittermeyer comes to the understanding that if he had refused the Kaiser's order, Reinhard would have led the force. Thus, it would have increased unrest with all Reinhard's vassals. Mittermeyer considers killing Lang, but Kesler stops Mittermeyer. A report initiated by Lutz and investigated by Kesler implicates Lang of unjustly imprisoning and killing Nikolas Boltik. Hildegard realizes she is pregnant. On November 14th, Universal Calendar 800, Neue Reich Year 2, A space fleet of 42,770 ships commanded by Mittermeyer, Wahlen, and Bittenfeld launch toward Reunthal's territory.
95	"Clash of the Twin Jewels!"; Transliteration: "Sōheki Aiutsu!" (Japanese: 双璧相撃つ!)
Admiral Grillpalzer convinces Admiral Knapfstein to join Reuenthal's side while betraying him later. Mittermeyer discusses battle plans with his subordinates. Wahlen tries to convince Reinhard to exercise restraint. Murai arrives at Iserlohn as Reuenthal's messenger of negotiations. Julian decides to refuse Reuenthal's offer. To accept it would be a short term gain with consequences later from the Empire. Reuenthal and Mittermeyer talk about resolving the situation, but are unable to persuade each other. Reuenthal had realized that Reinhard needed a strong opponent more than anything else. In Reuenthal's fleet, unrest is brewing. Reuenthal explains to his soldiers they are fighting against villainous vassals within the Empire. Moreover, Reuenthal had to secure a victory to raise morale.
96	"To Live by the Sword..."; Transliteration: "Ken ni Iki..." (Japanese: 剣に生き...)
Reuenthal plans to divide up his fleet into a formation which would surround incoming fleets. Mittermeyer arrives first, quickly attacking before Reuenthal tactical plans are set up. Mittermeyer uses quick fleet movement to prolong the battle and limit casualties. Over time, Bittenfeld and Wahlen's fleets arrive as well. Wahlen is nearly killed and loses his artificial arm. Bittenfeld's fleet formation is unstable due to it being 1/2 survivors from his fleet and the remainders Fahrenheit's fleet. Admiral Knapfstein is killed in battle. Eventually the battle becomes a war of attrition. As it is reported that Mecklinger is approaching from the rear, Reuenthal orders a hasty retreat in order to prevent a pincer attack and to defend Heinessen.
97	"To Die by the Sword"; Transliteration: "Ken ni Taore" (Japanese: 剣に斃れ)
Mittermeyer's fleet catches up with Reuenthal's fleet as they head to Heinessen. Grillpalzer betrays Reuenthal's fleet and fires on his former allies. Reuenthal's flagship is hit by long distance artillery. Reuenthal is impaled in the chest by a piece of metal. Reuenthal continues to order tactics as he becomes pale. Grillpalzer surrenders to Wahlen's fleet. Mecklinger discovers Terraism evidence on Uruvashi hidden by Grillpalzer. Mecklinger orders Grillpalzer arrested. Reuenthal returns to Heinessen with only 10% of his fleet remaining.
98	"The Endless Requiem"; Transliteration: "Owari naki Chinkonkyoku (Rekuiemu)" (Japanese: 終わりなき鎮魂曲(レクイエム))
Reuenthal returns to his office and assigns all domestic political matters to Elsheimer. Trüniht is killed by Reuenthal after they both discuss their ambitions and Reinhard. Reuenthal is visited by Elfriede von Kohlrausch and her baby. Reuenthal requests that she give his son to Mittermeyer. On November 14th, Universal Calendar 800, Neue Reich Year 2, Reuenthal dies at the age of 33. Mittermeyer arrives on Heinessen, but is too late to meet with his old friend. Admiral Bergengrün, who also served under Kircheis commits suicide, after hearing of Reuenthal's death. Bergengrün had lost both his commanders to underhanded political schemes. Lang confesses to all his actions and implicates Rubinsky. Rubinsky is nowhere to be found.
99	"Approach to the Future"; Transliteration: "Mirai e no Josō" (Japanese: 未来への助走)
Mittermeyer and the other admirals return to Fezzan. All the admirals are debriefed by Reinhard. Mittermeyer meets with Hilde and discusses the adoption policy for Reuenthal's child. Mittermeyer adopts Reuenthal's child and servant and brings them home to meet his wife. Hilde reveals to Reinhard she is pregnant with his child, she accepts his marriage proposal. The Terraists feud now that Reinhard has a successor. A deranged Landsberg leads Imperial police to the mummified corpse of Erwin Josef II. In Iserlohn, the staff celebrates the new year with a large party.
100	"Hoch Kaiserin!"; Transliteration: "Kōhi Banzai! (Hōfu Kaizārin)" (Japanese: 皇妃ばんざい!(ホーフ·カイザーリン))
Kaiser Reinhard publicly announces his marriage to Hildegard von Mariendorf at the Imperial new years party. Hilda's father, Count Mariendorf resigns from his position recommending Mittermeyer as the new Minister of Internal Affairs. Many of the ministers discuss joint rulership and succession rights for the upcoming Empress. Grand Duchess Grünewald visits Reinhard and Hilde on Fezzan. On January 29th, Reinhard and Hilda's are wed. Oberstein interrupts the wedding midway through to report riots on Heinessen.
101	"Invitation to Upheaval"; Transliteration: "Dōran e no Sasoi" (Japanese: 動乱への誘い)
In January of Universal Calendar 801, Neue Reich Calendar 3, the chronic shortage of basic consumer goods caused riots throughout Heinessen. The distribution system is attacked by terrorism, complicating the problem further. Wahlan suppresses the riots and hands out a portion of the military food supplies to cool the riots. The Imperial admirals consider a campaign against Iserlohn, but decide not to due to the Imperial Treasury running low from continuous military expeditions. On Iserlohn, Julian thinks if the riots around alliance territory would be a good time to re liberate old Alliance territories. Many republicans are distrustful of the Iserlohn government for letting Mecklinger through the corridor. Julian decides to go to battle, citing the opportune moment and the fact that Reinhard's personality would look down upon a risk averse successor in Iserlohn.
102	"Daring to Take Up Arms"; Transliteration: "Aete Buki o Te ni" (Japanese: 敢えて武器を手に)
Wahlan orders his fleet to investigate after learning of fleet movements inside the Iserlohn corridor. On the Imperial side of the corridor, Julian approaches Imperial Admiral Wagenseil's fleet. Using strike craft and a slow withdrawal strategy, Julian infuriates Wagenseil. Wagenseil fleet is lured into range of the Iserlohn Thor hammer cannon and loses a large portion its ships. Wahlan's fleet tries to attack Iserlohn from the back before the Thor hammer recharges. Merkatz ambushes Wahlan's fleet from a blind spot while Julian approaches from around the fortress, executing a pincer formation. The Thor hammer fires two more times, causing massive damage to the pincered Wahlan fleet, who then retreats. Reinhard prepares for a counterattack from Fezzan, but is bedridden with a high fever.
103	"Cosmic Mosaic"; Transliteration: "Kozumikku Mozaiku" (Japanese: コズミック·モザイク)
Grand Duchess Grünewald visits Hilda and the sickly Reinhard. Although Reinhard's expedition was canceled, the problems of the insurgency and Iserlohn fleet remained. Oberstein is chosen to handle the new problems for the Empire. Oberstein takes Müller and Bittenfeld with him on the campaign. News of the Iserlohn victory bypasses Imperial news censors, causing many protests. Oberstein orders the arrest of all former public officials in the Alliance. Oberstein infuriates Müller, Bittenfeld, and Wahlen with his plan of using hostages to draw out the forces of Iserlohn, which prompts Bittenfeld to physically attack him. On Iserlohn, the Julian fleet wonders what to do if the Empire were to abandon Heinessen and use it as a lure.
104	"Towards Peace, Via Bloodshed"; Transliteration: "Heiwa e, Ryūketsu Keiyu" (Japanese: 平和へ、流血経由)
Reinhard learns of the rift between Oberstein and his admirals. Word of the rift leaks to all the soldiers and civilians on Heinessen. Bittenfeld is put under house arrest by Oberstein for assaulting him. Street fights between Bittenfeld's forces and the military police under Oberstein erupt. Müller tries to convince Bittenfeld to apologize to Oberstein in hopes decreasing further violence between Imperial troops. The Iserlohn group gets the news of the trouble on Heinessen. They decide to divide up their leadership and accept negotiations on Heinessen for the release of the hostages.
105	"Planet in Turmoil"; Transliteration: "Konmei no Wakusei" (Japanese: 昏迷の惑星)
A riot breaks out at Rugpool prison, where the 5000 political prisoners were being held. The rioters are somehow well armed and the situation deteriorates. Bittenfeld's lancers fight with the military police. At the end of the night, over 4000 of the prisoners are dead or injured. Julian's envoy fleet heads back to Iserlohn on news of the riots and martial law on Heinessen. Rubinsky is captured by Oberstein's agents. Reinhard releases all political prisoners and sends Müller to ask the Julian envoy to come once again to Heinessen.
106	"The Stehibalm Schlossbrand"; Transliteration: "Hiiragi-Kan (Shutehhiparumu Shurosu) Enjō" (Japanese: 柊舘(シュテッヒパルム·シュロス)炎上)
Terraists attack multiple critical infrastructure locations on Fezzan. Communications with High Admiral Kesler are not re established till later when Terraists storm Stehibalm Schloss, the provisional home for Hilde and Grünewald. Marika von Feuerbach, a servant to Hilde leads Kesler and his military police to Hilde and Grünewald before they are assassinated. Hilde is rushed to a hospital where she gives birth to the new prince of the Lohengramm dynasty. Kesler uses torture and truth serum on the Terraists, cleaning out all Terraist influence on Fezzan. Reinhard names his new son Alexander Siegfried von Lohengramm.
107	"Crimson Star Road"; Transliteration: "Shinku no Seiro (Kurimuzon Sutārōdo)" (Japanese: 深紅の星路(クリムゾン·スターロード))
In late May of Universal Calendar 801, Neue Reich Calendar 3 a refugee ship chased by Imperial ships runs into the Julian fleet. The Julian fleet decides to engage the Imperial ships. Eventually both sides send reinforcements and the full number of ships for each fleet is present. The Imperial fleet includes 51,700 ships while the Julian fleet has 9,800 ships. Both fleets act cautiously rotate their front line forces. Reinhard collapses midway through the battle. A communications blackout results in frustration from the Imperial admirals. Poplin intercepts some communications between Mittermeyer's ship and Reinhard's flagship. The Julian fleet decides to board the Brünhild with melee infantry.
108	"The Brünnhild Calls for Blood"; Transliteration: "Biki (Buryunhiruto) wa Chi o Hoisu" (Japanese: 美姫(ブリュンヒルト)は血を欲す)
The Rosenritter soldiers latch on to Flagship Brünhild. The Imperial doctors reveal to the admirals that Reinhard has an unknown and incurable disease. General Schönkopf holds off the Royal guard with his soldiers. Reinhard prepares to meet with Julian, should Julian make it to his room. Bittenfeld frustrated with inactivity, rushes into the Merkatz fleet. Admiral Merkatz is killed in battle. Mashengo dies protecting Julian from gunfire. Schönkopf is fatally wounded in battle while Poplin fights off Reinhard's Imperial guard. Julian reaches Reinhard's room for negotiations. A truce is announced.
109	"The Dying Light of the Goldenlöwe"; Transliteration: "Ōgon Shishi Ki (Gōrudenrūve) ni Hikari nashi" (Japanese: 黄金獅子旗(ゴールデンルーヴェ)に光なし)
Julian, Poplin, and the remaining Rosen Ritter soldiers return to Iserlohn. The setting is mixed, a truce was given but the Julian fleet lost many important members. Julian and Kate decide to officially have a dating relationship. Both the Reinhard and Julian fleets arrive on Heinessen. Rubinsky kills himself in the hospital, setting off multiple bombs under Heinessenpolis tied to his brain waves. Reinhard and Julian discuss the next steps politically. It is agreed that Heinessen and its surrounding systems are to be given autonomy for the ownership of Iserlohn. They consider setting up a constitution for the Empire. Both Julian and Reinhard's staff prepare to leave to Fezzan.
110	"Seeing a Dream Through to the End"; Transliteration: "Yume, Mihatetari" (Japanese: 夢、見果てたり)
Schumacher is caught by the Imperial police. Schumacher confesses that he thinks the last of the Terra cultists have landed on Fezzan. Julian and Reinhard exchange stories and political points on their trip to Fezzan. Reinhard's sister and wife tend to him as he lays bedridden. Oberstein releases a rumor that the Kaiser plans to destroy Terra to drive out the remaining Terraists. Julian and friends notice the Terra cultists at the hotel and kill the last of the Terraists. Oberstein used himself as bait and died in place of the Kaiser, although it's not known for certain whether it was part of his strategy or a mistake on his part. Reinhard is surrounded by all his admirals, family, and ministers as he prepares to die. Reinhard wants to leave his son with a friend equal to Kircheis and chooses Mittermeyer's adopted son. The Julian fleet members go their separate ways. On July 26th of Universal Calendar 801, Neue Reich Calendar 3, Reinhard dies, after leaving the Empire and the decision to institute constitutional reforms in his wife's hands. At the Mittermeyer estate young Felix reaches for the stars, echoing Reinhard's ambition.

== Gaiden 1 ==
The Gaiden 1 (外伝1) series, released between February and September 1998, adapts the short stories "Silver-White Valley" (episodes 1–4), "Dreams of the Morning, Songs of the Night" (5–8), "Dishonour", and the novel A Hundred Billion Stars, a Hundred Billion Lights (9–12). Both Gaidens are prequels to the main story, depicting events that take place before season 1 of the show.

No.	Title
1	"Silver-White Valley: Chapter I"; Transliteration: "Hakugin no Tani Kapitel I" (Japanese: 白銀の谷 第I章)
In July 791 UC, newly graduated officers Reinhard von Müsel and Siegfried Kircheis receive their first posting to the frozen planet Kapche-Lanka. Unbeknownst to them, Sussanna von Beenemünde has bribed their new commander, Captain Herder, to arrange Reinhard's death as part of a plot rooted in her hatred of Annerose von Grünewald.
2	"Silver-White Valley: Chapter II"; Transliteration: "Hakugin no Tani Kapitel II" (Japanese: 白銀の谷 第II章)
As part of Herder's scheme, Reinhard and Kircheis are ordered to reconnoitre deep into Kapche-Lanka for Alliance activity with only a single tank. Sabotage leaves them without enough fuel to return to base, and by nightfall they are stranded. When they encounter an Alliance tank unit, they decide to ambush it to obtain fuel and a way back.
3	"Silver-White Valley: Chapter III"; Transliteration: "Hakugin no Tani Kapitel III" (Japanese: 白銀の谷 第III章)
Reinhard and Kircheis successfully ambush the Alliance advance unit, securing fuel and data that reveal plans for a surprise attack on their base. Suspecting Captain Herder's involvement in the attempt on their lives, they lie in wait for an accomplice and kill Lieutenant Fugenberch when he appears with hostile intent. Returning to the base amid the Alliance assault, Kircheis uses codes derived from the captured data to disable enemy tanks and enable a successful Imperial counter-attack.
4	"Silver-White Valley: Chapter IV"; Transliteration: "Hakugin no Tani Kapitel IV" (Japanese: 白銀の谷 第IV章)
Pretending not to know of Herder's plot, Reinhard proposes a strike on the Alliance base on Kapche-Lanka, which Herder approves while planning another "accident". During the operation he sends Reinhard and Kircheis off on a separate mission and attempts to ambush them, but Kircheis brings Commander Martial to witness Herder's actions. Exposed and facing charges of high treason, Herder commits suicide by throwing himself into a valley. Reinhard and Kircheis are promoted for their role in the victory and transferred away, although Sussanna von Beenemünde remains beyond their reach.
5	"Dreams of the Morning, Songs of the Night: Chapter I"; Transliteration: "Asa no Yume, Yoru no Uta Kapitel I" (Japanese: 朝の夢、夜の歌 第I章)
In April 793 UC, while awaiting new postings, Reinhard and Kircheis visit their old military preparatory school on Odin and are warmly received by the students. They are then assigned to the Imperial Military Police, where Reinhard discovers a past case handled by Ulrich Kesler that tried to shield civilians from abuse. Outraged that Kesler's efforts ultimately failed, he launches into a tirade about the Empire's decay, which ends when he and Kircheis are ordered back to their alma mater to investigate the apparent murder of student Karl von Reifeisen.
6	"Dreams of the Morning, Songs of the Night: Chapter II"; Transliteration: "Asa no Yume, Yoru no Uta Kapitel II" (Japanese: 朝の夢、夜の歌 第II章)
Reinhard and Kircheis take up temporary lodgings in the school dormitory as they begin their investigation. After a night in which Reinhard dreams of his past, they examine the scene of Reifeisen's death, study his school records and interview Moritz von Haase, a top student sent to assist them. Despite a full day of inquiry, they make no real progress toward identifying a culprit.
7	"Dreams of the Morning, Songs of the Night: Chapter III"; Transliteration: "Asa no Yume, Yoru no Uta Kapitel III" (Japanese: 朝の夢、夜の歌 第III章)
At Reifeisen's funeral, Reinhard notes that Haase's eulogy is correct in form but curiously devoid of feeling. After offering condolences, he reflects with Kircheis on a populace that has endured four centuries of repression. That night Reinhard is informed of his father Sebastian von Müsel's death, and the two attend the funeral and briefly meet Annerose. On returning to the school they learn that another top-ranking student has been killed, and examination of the scene leads Kircheis to suspect that Haase is colour-blind and may have altered evidence to conceal his condition.
8	"Dreams of the Morning, Songs of the Night: Chapter IV"; Transliteration: "Asa no Yume, Yoru no Uta Kapitel IV" (Japanese: 朝の夢、夜の歌 第IV章)
Reinhard and Kircheis revisit the site of Reifeisen's death, where a falling bag of flour gives Reinhard the clue he needs. Reporting to principal Gerhard von Steger, they stage a confrontation that appears to accuse Haase, using his colour-blindness to unsettle Steger. Reinhard then reconstructs the chain of events, arguing that Reifeisen died in an accident which Steger concealed, and that Steger later murdered the second-ranked student, Johann Gottholp von Bertz, in a way that framed Haase. With the scheme laid bare, Steger and Haase are taken into custody and the case is closed.
9	"Dishonour: Chapter I"; Transliteration: "Omei Kapitel I" (Japanese: 汚名 第I章)
In November 795 UC, Kircheis arrives at the resort satellite Kreuznach III for a short vacation arranged by Reinhard, who must remain on Odin to prepare to receive the countship of Lohengramm. While checking into his hotel, Kircheis saves an elderly man from a knife-wielding drug addict. The man is Michael von Keyserling, a disgraced former vice admiral, and at the local police station Superintendent Hoffmann asks Kircheis to help with a major thyoxin-trafficking case that may be linked to the assault.
10	"Dishonour: Chapter II"; Transliteration: "Omei Kapitel II" (Japanese: 汚名 第II章)
Returning to his hotel, Kircheis finds an invitation from Keyserling to dinner as thanks for saving his life and decides to accept. Keyserling talks about his past and mentions that old friends will arrive the next day, while Hoffmann later reveals that the attacker once served under Keyserling. That night someone tries to kill Kircheis by flooding his room's air-conditioning with dry ice, and although Hoffmann suspects Keyserling, Kircheis is not convinced. He also learns that Keyserling's "friends" had in fact arrived a day earlier, a fact Keyserling appears not to know.
11	"Dishonour: Chapter III"; Transliteration: "Omei Kapitel III" (Japanese: 汚名 第III章)
Keyserling introduces Kircheis to his old comrade Christoph von Basel, a retired vice admiral who falsely claims to have arrived only the previous day. Later, Kircheis follows a suspicious man and is ambushed inside a flying ball court by five knife-wielding attackers, managing to hold out until Hoffmann and the police intervene. Hoffmann explains that the original assailant once served in a supply unit led by Basel and suspects a dispute over the thyoxin trade. Seeking Keyserling's side of the story, Kircheis confronts him and learns that Keyserling has long concealed Basel's role in trafficking to protect Basel's wife, Johanna, whom he loved.
12	"Dishonour: Chapter IV"; Transliteration: "Omei Kapitel IV" (Japanese: 汚名 第IV章)
Although he admits knowing Basel leads the trafficking organisation, Keyserling refuses to testify against him. Johanna von Basel tells Kircheis that she already knew of her husband's crimes and was the anonymous informant who alerted the Kreuznach III police, but she also declines to appear in court. At Hoffmann's urging, Kircheis confronts Basel directly and tricks him into a confession, only for Basel to order Johanna to burn incriminating documents. As Kircheis hesitates to stop her, Keyserling shoots Johanna, ending both their relationship and the struggle. With the case effectively over, Kircheis meets Reinhard at Kreuznach III's spaceport and they leave together for a brief holiday.
13	"The Battle of Van-Fleet Starzone"; Transliteration: "Van-Furīto Hoshiiki no Kaisen" (Japanese: ヴァンフリート星域の会戦)
On 21 March 794 UC, Imperial forces under Gregor von Mückenberger invade the Van-Fleet Starzone and clash with an Alliance fleet commanded by Lasalle Lobos. The fighting drags on inconclusively, leaving newly promoted Commodore Reinhard von Müsel, now commanding a squadron in Richard von Grimmelshausen's fleet, frustrated with both the conduct of the battle and his limited influence over it.
14	"Drei Rot"; Transliteration: "Drei Rot" (Japanese: 三つの赤（ドライ・ロット）)
As the stalemate continues, Mückenberger orders the Grimmelshausen Fleet to regroup at Van-Fleet 4-2, a satellite far from the front that he regards as safe. Unknown to him, the Alliance has already built a rear support base there. When Reinhard voices his concern that the satellite may host an enemy facility and suggests a reconnaissance mission, ground-combat specialist Commodore Hermann von Lüneburg steps in and volunteers to lead it, while the Alliance dispatches the Rosen Ritter from Van-Fleet 4-2 to locate the Imperial position.
15	"Those Who Defected"; Transliteration: "Bōmeisha-tachi" (Japanese: 亡命者たち)
Walter von Schönkopf, worried that his commander Otto Frank von Wahnschaffe has not returned from the Rosen Ritter's reconnaissance, sets out with trusted subordinates to find him. They discover that Lüneburg, formerly the regiment's commander, now leads Imperial troops on Van-Fleet 4-2. After reuniting with Wahnschaffe, they are ambushed by Lüneburg's forces and escape only with heavy losses, including Wahnschaffe's death. Back at the base, Schönkopf assumes de facto command of the defence and urges Sinclair Cerebrese to request reinforcements, a call answered by Alexandre Bewcock's 5th Fleet.
16	"Bloodshed in April"; Transliteration: "Senketsu no Shigatsu" (Japanese: 染血の四月)
Hermann von Lüneburg prepares to assault the Alliance rear base on Van-Fleet 4-2, with Reinhard assigned as his vice-commander despite holding the same rank. Reinhard resents serving under Lüneburg and is further provoked when offered a subordinate position in Lüneburg's future command. On the Alliance side, Schönkopf, now interim Rosen Ritter commander, must organise a defence with inferior equipment, poor supplies and limited coordination, aiming only to hold out until fleet reinforcements arrive. On 6 April 794 UC, Imperial and Alliance ground forces finally collide.
17	"A Dangerous Man"; Transliteration: "Kiken na Otoko" (Japanese: 危険な男)
The Imperial assault on the Alliance base continues, but difficult terrain prevents a quick breakthrough despite the heavy casualties inflicted. The 5th Fleet reaches Van-Fleet 4-2 only to be drawn into battle with the main Imperial fleet, and soon other Alliance formations converge on the satellite as well. The fighting above the planet turns into a chaotic melee as ships from both sides try to manoeuvre and fire in the confined area.
18	"Chronicle of the Aftermath of the Chaotic War"; Transliteration: "Konsen Shūmatsu-ki" (Japanese: 混戦始末記)
Imperial troops finally break into the Alliance headquarters on Van-Fleet 4-2, causing severe damage. Reinhard, aided by Kircheis, captures Sinclair Cerebrese alive before retreat orders arrive, and they withdraw to rejoin their fleet. In space, the battle between Imperial and Alliance forces remains unresolved until both sides pull out of the Van-Fleet Starzone near the end of April 794 UC. Reinhard is promoted to rear admiral, as are Grimmelshausen and Lüneburg by one rank, while Kircheis receives no advancement, much to Reinhard's anger.
19	"The Hard Wind of Early Summer"; Transliteration: "Shoka, Kaze Tsuyoshi" (Japanese: 初夏、風強し)
Lüneburg and his wife Elisabeth visit High Admiral Ovlesser, commander of the Imperial Panzergrenadiers, ostensibly to mark Lüneburg's promotion but in reality to seek noble backing against Reinhard. Ovlesser, who dislikes Lüneburg as much as Reinhard does, rebuffs his approach. At the same time, Kircheis reports to Reinhard on his investigation into Lüneburg's background, and later they meet Annerose to discuss Kircheis's lack of promotion. Before Annerose can intervene, Grimmelshausen has already recommended Kircheis, and when Kircheis goes to thank him he sees that the seemingly senile admiral possesses sharp insight.
20	"Candidate for Succeeding a Count's Family"; Transliteration: "Hakushaku-ke Kōkei Kōho" (Japanese: 伯爵家後継候補)
Kircheis returns to his hometown for the first time in eight years to visit his parents and briefly reconnects with his past. Soon afterward, Kaiser Friedrich IV informs Grimmelshausen of his intention to grant Reinhard a countship on his twentieth birthday, a plan Grimmelshausen strongly supports. News of the proposed ennoblement quickly spreads through the court, provoking outrage among the high nobles, while rumours about Lüneburg's origins and past circulate alongside it.
21	"The Night of the Party"; Transliteration: "Pāti no Yoru" (Japanese: パーティーの夜)
At a party celebrating Grimmelshausen's promotion to admiral, Reinhard openly clashes with Lüneburg and nearly comes to blows before Ulrich Kesler, responsible for security, intervenes. After the guests leave, Grimmelshausen entrusts Kesler with a confidential task. Kircheis reports to Reinhard what he has learned about the fate of Elisabeth von Lüneburg's former fiancé, while Friedrich IV decides that the title to be granted will be the countship of Lohengramm. At the same time, a new campaign beyond the Iserlohn Corridor is announced.
22	"Truth Is the Daughter of Time"; Transliteration: "Shinjitsu wa Toki no Musume" (Japanese: 真実は時の娘)
On 26 September 794 UC, Reinhard and Kircheis arrive at Iserlohn Fortress, where Reinhard's squadron of over 1,000 ships is assigned to help repel an expected large-scale Alliance offensive. They encounter Ulrich Kesler, now acting as Grimmelshausen's agent at the fortress. While the Alliance expeditionary force prepares and the Rosen Ritter vow to settle accounts with Lüneburg, skirmishes around the Iserlohn Corridor between October and November give Reinhard opportunities to refine his tactics and earn distinction. An Alliance attempt to trap his squadron using a plan devised by Yang Wen-li fails when Alliance commanders do not follow the plan strictly, and on 1 December the Alliance completes its deployment outside Iserlohn, beginning the Sixth Battle of Iserlohn.
23	"The Sixth Battle of Iserlohn"; Transliteration: "Dai Roku-ji Iserlohn Kōbō-sen" (Japanese: 第六次イゼルローン攻防戦)
The Alliance opens the Sixth Battle of Iserlohn with Willem Holland's plan: the main fleet acts as a diversion while his squadron slips in to bombard the fortress walls. Reinhard anticipates the move and intercepts Holland, then uses the narrow corridor to inflict heavy losses on the Alliance main force. Mückenberger commits additional Imperial fleets, and Lobos, following Yang Wen-li's advice, throws Alliance reserves into the fray, turning the engagement into a confused melee. In the turmoil, the Rosen Ritter lure out Lüneburg, whose boarding attempt on the strike ship Cheiron 3 ends with his death in single combat against Walter von Schönkopf. While his ships resupply at Iserlohn, Reinhard hears from Kesler about Elisabeth von Lüneburg's former fiancé and receives Grimmelshausen's dossier on the nobles' misdeeds, which he politely declines to use for blackmail.
24	"A Hundred Billion Stars, One Ambition"; Transliteration: "Sen Oku no Hoshi, Hitotsu no Yabō" (Japanese: 千億の星、ひとつの野望)
As the battle drags on, Yang Wen-li argues that the Alliance should now withdraw, but his superiors delay. Reinhard, dissatisfied with the stalemate, submits a plan directly to Mückenberger to strike a decisive blow, and is authorised to carry it out. By 10 December 794 UC, Dwight Greenhill has organised the Alliance for an orderly retreat when Reinhard's squadron suddenly attacks the front line, provoking local commanders into an undisciplined pursuit that exposes their ships to the fortress's Thor Hammer. The Alliance suffers a major defeat and the Sixth Battle of Iserlohn ends in a clear Imperial victory, confirming Reinhard's growing reputation as a fleet commander.

== Gaiden 2 ==
The Gaiden 2 (外伝2) series, released between December 1999 and July 2000, adapted the novels Spiral Labyrinth (1–4) and part of Star Crusher (27–28), as well as the original stories "The Mutineer" (15–18), "The Duellist" (19–22) and "The Retriever" (23–26).

No.	Title
1	"The Hero of El Facil"; Transliteration: "Eru Fashiru no Eiyū" (Japanese: エル・ファシルの英雄)
In May 788 UC, during an Imperial attack near El Facil, Sub-lieutenant Yang Wen-li serves on the flagship of Rear Admiral Arthur Lynch and recalls how his father's death left him penniless and forced him into the Officer Academy. When Imperial reinforcements threaten to overrun the planet and the Alliance high command flees, Lynch withdrwas, leaving Yang to handle civilian evacuation. Using their leaders' escape as a diversion, Yang leads the civilian ships away on a different vector and succeeds in evacuating them, earning the title "Hero of El Facil."
2	"The Hero's New Assignment"; Transliteration: "Eiyū no Atarashii Shigoto" (Japanese: 英雄の新しい仕事)
On 19 September 788 UC, Yang is promoted first to lieutenant and, six hours later, to lieutenant commander for his actions at El Facil. As media, politicians and even estranged relatives attempt to exploit his new fame, Yang grows increasingly uncomfortable with his reputation. Seeking quieter work, he accepts an assignment from Alex Cazerne to investigate the "Tuesday Correspondence" and its claim that war hero Bruce Ashbey was murdered rather than killed in action.
3	"A Profile of Heroes"; Transliteration: "Eiyū-tachi no Purofīru" (Japanese: 英雄たちの横顔プロフィール)
Yang begins reviewing the history of the Year 730 Mafia, a group of rising officers whose most famous member was Admiral Bruce Ashbey. As he assembles dossiers on their campaigns, he notes how official hagiographies gloss over tensions and contradictions. The deeper he studies Ashbey's circle, the more the gaps in the record suggest deliberate omission.
4	"A Short Trip to the Past"; Transliteration: "Kako e no Sasayaka na Tabi" (Japanese: 過去へのささやかな旅)
Yang reminisces about his days at the Officer Academy with Jean Robert Lapp and Jessica Edwards, then meets Alfred Rosas to discuss Rosas's time with the Year 730 Mafia and Bruce Ashbey's death. Rosas warns him that every legend has its counter-legend and that not all contemporaries admired Ashbey. Yang's interviews with veterans and his visits to minor archives further complicate the neat official version of events.
5	"The Man Loved by the Goddess of Time: Chronicle of the Second Battle of Tiamat, Part I"; Transliteration: "Toki no Megami ni Aisareta Otoko: Dainiji Tiamato Kaisenki I" (Japanese: 時の女神に愛された男 〜第二次ティアマト会戦記I〜)
Yang's research reconstructs the Second Battle of Tiamat in December 745 UC, when Alliance forces under Admiral Bruce Ashbey clashed with an Imperial fleet commanded by Fleet Admiral Zieten. The Alliance order of battle is dominated by the Year 730 Mafia, whose internal dissension threatens morale on the eve of combat. Despite this, the Alliance gains an early advantage by destroying Vice Admiral Wilhelm von Mückenberger's fleet, helping to build Ashbey's image as a commander favored by timing and luck.
6	"The Death of a Hero: Chronicle of the Second Battle of Tiamat, Part II"; Transliteration: "Eiyū no Shi: Dainiji Tiamato Kaisenki II" (Japanese: 英雄の死 〜第二次ティアマト会戦記II〜)
On 7 December 745 UC, as the battle resumes, the Alliance fleet edges toward encirclement by the numerically superior Imperials. Ashbey, anticipating the danger, strikes at the right moment to break the encirclement, turning the engagement into a major Alliance victory, though he is too late to save fellow Mafia member Vittorio di Bertini. Just as the fighting ends, Ashbey's flagship Hard Luck is hit by stray Imperial fire, killing him and ensuring that his ambiguous, abrupt death feeds later myths.
7	"Between the Mourning Dress and Military Uniform"; Transliteration: "Mofuku to Gunpuku no Aida" (Japanese: 喪服と軍服の間)
After completing his reconstruction of the battle, Yang returns to Heinessen only to learn of Alfred Rosas's sudden death and attends his funeral. Discussing the Year 730 Mafia's fate with Alex Cazerne and Dusty Attemborough, Yang reflects on how public rituals and official histories diverge from private grief. Before he can draw firm conclusions, he receives notice of a new assignment on Econia, site of a prisoner-of-war camp.
8	"Planet POW Camp"; Transliteration: "Shūyōjo Wakusei" (Japanese: 収容所惑星)
Yang travels to Econia in the Thanatos Starzone to take up his new post and meets Fyodor Patrichev and several veterans of the Second Battle of Tiamat, including the camp's oldest inmate, Christopf von Köfenhiller. The POW camp appears outwardly calm, but Yang notices signs of mismanagement and simmering resentment beneath the surface. He begins to suspect that the apparent stability masks more serious problems.
9	"Prisoners and Hostages"; Transliteration: "Horyo to Hitojichi" (Japanese: 捕虜と人質)
A prisoner named Preßburg leads a disturbance that escalates into a hostage situation, with several Alliance officers seized. To secure their release, Yang and Patrichev are ordered to offer themselves as substitutes, and Köfenhiller volunteers to join them inside the compound. The three men enter the rebels' area, turning the standoff into a tense negotiation.
10	"A Rebellion of Microscopic Size"; Transliteration: "Kenbikyō Saizu no Hanran" (Japanese: 顕微鏡サイズの反乱)
Captain Barnaby Costea orders his troops to storm the rebel compound, hoping to kill Yang and Patrichev in the crossfire to hide his embezzlement of camp funds. With Köfenhiller's help, Yang, Patrichev and the prisoners escape the immediate trap, and Preßburg reveals that the entire rebellion was staged on Costea's promise of early repatriation. Yang and Patrichev then seize the camp command centre and arrest Costea before reporting the affair to the Thanatos Starzone military police.
11	"The Hero of Econia"; Transliteration: "Ekonia no Eiyū" (Japanese: エコニアの英雄)
Murai, an investigator from the Thanatos Starzone military police, arrives on Econia and interviews everyone connected to the incident. Costea is arrested to face court-martial on charges of embezzlement and responsibility for the deaths caused by the staged rebellion, while Patrichev receives an unofficial reprimand for lying about Yang's original assignment. At Cazerne's recommendation, Yang is transferred back to Heinessen, and Köfenhiller is released, granted Alliance citizenship and a pension corresponding to his former Imperial rank, though he questions whether this imposed "freedom" is truly his own choice.
12	"A Thread from the Past"; Transliteration: "Kako kara no Ito" (Japanese: 過去からの糸)
Yang and Patrichev escort Köfenhiller toward Heinessen, and during a layover on the planet Masjid, Köfenhiller describes his role in the Second Battle of Tiamat and how he became interested in the links among Martin Otto von Siegmeister, Christoph von Michaelsen and Bruce Ashbey. His story suggests that covert networks and intelligence leaks lay behind many Alliance victories. Soon after finishing his account, Köfenhiller collapses and dies in the spaceport terminal, leaving Yang with a new "thread" connecting past and present.
13	"The End of One Journey"; Transliteration: "Hitotsu no Tabi no Owari" (Japanese: ひとつの旅の終わり)
Yang and Patrichev arrange Köfenhiller's funeral on Masjid and then part ways upon returning to Heinessen. That evening, Yang dines with Cazerne and Dusty Attemborough and meets Cazerne's fiancée, Hortense Milbelle, before beginning to present his findings on the circumstances of Ashbey's death. His investigation, built on Köfenhiller's research and his own inquiries, is ready to be formalised, even though he doubts it will satisfy anyone seeking a simple narrative.
14	"The Journey in Search of the Exit"; Transliteration: "Deguchi o Sagasu Tabi" (Japanese: 出口をさがす旅)
Yang outlines his conclusions to Cazerne and Attemborough: Siegmeister, holding republican sympathies, built a vast espionage network inside the Empire with Michaelsen's help to leak military secrets to the Alliance, and Ashbey exploited this network to win repeated victories until his death at Tiamat. Afterward, the network gradually collapsed, culminating in Michaelsen's mysterious demise. Yang remarks that the full truth may remain unknowable until both the Empire and Alliance are gone, then accepts a new post as operations staff officer with the 8th Fleet and attends Cazerne and Hortense's wedding before leaving for the front.
15	"The Mutineer: Chapter I"; Transliteration: "Hanran-sha Kapitel I" (Japanese: 叛乱者 第I章)
In August 791 UC, after their transfer from Kapche-Lanka, Reinhard von Müsel and Siegfried Kircheis are posted to the destroyer Hameln II at Iserlohn Fortress as chief navigator and security officer. While the captain welcomes them, many crew members resent Reinhard as a noble's protégé and arrange a spacewalk contest between him and young enlistee Rolf Saider to test him. When Rolf runs into trouble during the walk, Reinhard risks his life to save him, gaining the respect of the enlisted men.
16	"The Mutineer: Chapter II"; Transliteration: "Hanran-sha Kapitel II" (Japanese: 叛乱者 第II章)
While on patrol in the Alliance side of the Iserlohn Corridor, Hameln II and its unit are ambushed, and the destroyer is heavily damaged in the opening salvo. The wounded captain, Lieutenant Commander Adenauer, passes command to Reinhard before losing consciousness, and Reinhard immediately steers the ship away from the doomed patrol group. When First Officer Hartmann Bertram returns and demands command, Reinhard refuses until the rest of the unit is destroyed and Hameln II reaches relative safety in an asteroid field, after which Bertram has him arrested for mutiny.
17	"The Mutineer: Chapter III"; Transliteration: "Hanran-sha Kapitel III" (Japanese: 叛乱者 第III章)
Convinced there is no escape, Bertram plans to self-destruct Hameln II in a "honourable" death, rejecting an alternative escape plan proposed by Schmidt, an enlisted man with astrophysics training. Horrified, Kircheis frees Reinhard with the help of sympathetic crew, seizing the bridge in open mutiny. Reinhard adopts Schmidt's plan to use a predicted solar eruption for a gravity-assisted escape, but Bertram breaks out, confronts them and kills Rolf Saider before Adenauer briefly revives to reaffirm Reinhard's command authority.
18	"The Mutineer: Chapter IV"; Transliteration: "Hanran-sha Kapitel IV" (Japanese: 叛乱者 第IV章)
As the solar eruption approaches, Reinhard has to prevent a panicked crewman from fleeing in an escape pod while engineers race to repair Hameln II's damaged engines. A malfunctioning thruster can only be fixed from outside, and Bertram volunteers for the dangerous outboard mission to atone for killing Rolf, accompanied by Rolf's brother Alanus. The repairs are finished just in time, but the ship's manoeuvre flings both men into space; Bertram sacrifices himself to push Alanus back aboard, and Hameln II escapes the Alliance ambush. On returning to Iserlohn Fortress, Reinhard is promoted and he and Kircheis receive a new posting.
19	"The Duellist: Chapter I"; Transliteration: "Kettō-sha Kapitel I" (Japanese: 決闘者 第I章)
In January 792 UC, Reinhard and Kircheis are assigned to the Investigation Department of the Imperial Ministry of Military Affairs on Odin, where clerical work and court intrigue leave Reinhard increasingly frustrated despite the chance to visit his sister Annerose. He learns that Annerose's friend, Viscountess Dorothea von Schaffhausen, is embroiled in a mining rights dispute with Count Herxheimer, a relative of Marquis Littenheim, who has manipulated the system to force a duel. Outraged that no professional duellist will represent her, Reinhard offers himself as the Schaffhausen family's champion.
20	"The Duellist: Chapter II"; Transliteration: "Kettō-sha Kapitel II" (Japanese: 決闘者 第II章)
As word of the upcoming duel spreads through high society, both Reinhard and Herxheimer's chosen agent train intensively. Unfamiliar with archaic flintlock pistols, Reinhard initially struggles until he receives unexpected instruction from Cornelius Lutz. Meanwhile, Sussanna von Beenemünde plots yet another attempt on his life by hiring an assassin, who kills Herxheimer's original agent in a preliminary duel to take his place.
21	"The Duellist: Chapter III"; Transliteration: "Kettō-sha Kapitel III" (Japanese: 決闘者 第III章)
Sensing murderous intent from his opponent, Reinhard follows Kircheis's advice and leaps sideways at the first shot, a legal but frowned-upon tactic, causing both men to miss. In the second exchange, Reinhard wounds the assassin's shoulder while taking a bullet in his left arm, realising that without using that arm to stabilise his aim he would have been killed. As the referee prepares to award the duel to Reinhard, the assassin insists on continuing with swords and gains the upper hand, only for Imperial Guards—acting on Kaiser Friedrich IV's orders—to halt the fight and impose a compromise that splits the mining rights between the two families.
22	"The Duellist: Chapter IV"; Transliteration: "Kettō-sha Kapitel IV" (Japanese: 決闘者 第IV章)
Pressured by Beenemünde and unable to accept the outcome, the assassin challenges Reinhard to a second duel. Reinhard, likewise dissatisfied, agrees, and with advance advice from Kircheis and a clear reading of his opponent's mental state, he overcomes the more experienced fighter. Unable to bear his defeat, the assassin commits suicide, and Beenemünde's plot fails once again.
23	"The Retriever: Chapter I"; Transliteration: "Dakkan-sha Kapitel I" (Japanese: 奪還者 第I章)
In December 792 UC, following his distinction at the Fifth Battle of Iserlohn, Reinhard is given six months' command of the cruiser Hässliche Entlein and a secret mission from Imperial intelligence. He must intercept Count Herxheimer, who has fallen from favour and is attempting to defect to the Alliance via Fezzan after stealing a prototype directional Seffle particle generator. With details classified, Reinhard is expected to operate alone in Alliance space and receive no overt support from the front.
24	"The Retriever: Chapter II"; Transliteration: "Dakkan-sha Kapitel II" (Japanese: 奪還者 第II章)
The Hässliche Entlein slips through the Iserlohn Corridor undetected and traverses Alliance territory to the Fezzan Corridor exit, where it finally overtakes Herxheimer's ship. Reinhard orders a swift engagement that destroys the escort and cripples the target, while Kircheis leads the boarding party that secures the prototype. The entire Herxheimer family is found dead from decompression during a failed escape, save for the count's young daughter Margareta, and the two Imperial ships must now evade an alerted Alliance patrol.
25	"The Retriever: Chapter III"; Transliteration: "Dakkan-sha Kapitel III" (Japanese: 奪還者 第III章)
Using the captured prototype, Reinhard manages to destroy the pursuing Alliance squadron, but the device itself remains locked aboard Herxheimer's ship and cannot yet be moved or fully controlled. As the Hässliche Entlein takes a roundabout route back toward the Iserlohn Corridor to avoid detection, Kircheis proposes negotiating with Margareta, the only person who knows the access code. Low on supplies, the crew's safe return now depends on the cooperation of the ten-year-old noble girl.
26	"The Retriever: Chapter IV"; Transliteration: "Dakkan-sha Kapitel IV" (Japanese: 奪還者 第IV章)
Margareta agrees to reveal the access code in exchange for permission to defect to the Alliance with her family's remaining assets, and intelligence officer Bendling unlocks the prototype in Reinhard and Kircheis's presence. The data not only activates the directional Seffle particles but also exposes disturbing facts about the circumstances leading to Herxheimer's defection, prompting Bendling to resign his post and leave as Margareta's guardian. After transferring the prototype to the Hässliche Entlein, Reinhard uses it to saturate an Alliance blockade with Seffle particles and ignite them, opening a path back into the Iserlohn Corridor, where Ernst von Eisenach's resupply completes the successful mission.
27	"The Third Battle of Tiamat: Part One"; Transliteration: "Daisanji Tiamato Kaisen Zenpen" (Japanese: 第三次ティアマト会戦 前篇)
In December 794 UC, to mark the thirtieth year of Kaiser Friedrich IV's reign, the Empire launches a massive expedition of 35,400 ships against the Alliance. Early Alliance preparations nearly end in scandal when a supply convoy is left exposed by shirking escorts, but by February 795 UC it deploys the 5th, 10th and 11th Fleets, with the 4th and 6th held in reserve, to intercept the Imperials in the Tiamat Starzone. As battle begins, Admiral Willem Holland's 11th Fleet ignores standard tactics and charges wildly into the Imperial line, sowing confusion and briefly turning the tide.
28	"The Third Battle of Tiamat: Part Two"; Transliteration: "Daisanji Tiamato Kaisen Kōhen" (Japanese: 第三次ティアマト会戦 後篇)
For several hours, Holland's unconventional "pioneer-like" attacks dominate the field, but as his formation overextends, Reinhard orders a precise long-range strike into the 11th Fleet's centre, destroying numerous ships including the flagship Epimetheus. The 11th Fleet collapses and retreats under cover from the 5th and 10th Fleets, which limit further losses before withdrawing the Alliance force from Tiamat. In recognition of his role, Reinhard is promoted to admiral, granted honorary posts and, most importantly to him, awarded the experimental battleship Brünhild as his personal flagship.

== Die Neue These season 1 ==
The first season, Encounter (Japanese: 邂逅, Kaikō), is a 12-episode series that covers the majority of volume 1 of the original novels.

No.	Title
1	"In the Eternal Night"; Transliteration: "Eien no Yoru no Naka de" (Japanese: 永遠の夜の中で)
January 796 UC: Reinhard von Lohengramm leads 20,000 Imperial ships at Astarte against three divided Alliance fleets. Over objections, he attacks first to crush them in detail, while Yang Wen-li's warnings to regroup go unheeded.
2	"The Battle of Astarte"; Transliteration: "Asutāte Kaisen" (Japanese: アスターテ会戦)
Reinhard destroys two Alliance fleets before engaging the 2nd Fleet. When Vice Admiral Paetta is incapacitated, Yang Wen-li takes command and extracts survivors, averting total disaster. In Fezzan, Rubinsky observes that the battle changes little in the long war.
3	"An Indomitable Prodigy"; Transliteration: "Jōshō no Tensai" (Japanese: 常勝の天才)
Reinhard is promoted to Fleet Admiral after Astarte and visits his sister Annerose. Flashbacks show how her conscription into the Kaiser's court drove Reinhard to overthrow the Goldenbaum dynasty, with Kircheis as his ally.
4	"The Unbeatable Magician"; Transliteration: "Fuhai no Majutsushi" (Japanese: 不敗の魔術師)
On Heinessen, Yang Wen-li faces press and politicians after Astarte, earning the nickname "Magician." His dry wit contrasts with the jingoism around him, underscoring the Alliance's political fragility.
5	"Birth of the 13th Fleet"; Transliteration: "Dai Jūsan Kantai Tanjō" (Japanese: 第十三艦隊誕生)
After a memorial turns violent, Yang is promoted to rear admiral and given command of the new 13th Fleet. His first mission: capture the supposedly impregnable Iserlohn Fortress.
6	"Iserlohn Capture Operation"; Transliteration: "Izerurōn Kōryaku Sakusen" (Japanese: イゼルローン攻略作戦)
Yang outlines his plan to infiltrate Iserlohn using a disguised ship. With the Rosen Ritter commandos, the 13th Fleet prepares to attempt the fortress's impossible capture.
7	"The Iserlohn Capture"; Transliteration: "Izerurōn Kōryaku" (Japanese: イゼルローン攻略)
The Rosen Ritter infiltrate the fortress and seize control of its main gun. With the Thor Hammer turned against the garrison, Yang captures Iserlohn, stunning both sides.
8	"The Castrop Rebellion"; Transliteration: "Kasutoroppu Dōran" (Japanese: カストロプ動乱)
Kircheis is dispatched to crush Maximilian von Castrop's rebellion, which relies on orbital defense satellites. He neutralizes them and the revolt collapses, as Oberstein seeks out Reinhard to pledge his loyalty.
9	"Each Person's Star"; Transliteration: "Sorezore no Hoshi" (Japanese: それぞれの星)
With Iserlohn lost, Alliance politicians clash over war policy. Peace advocates call for negotiations while hawks demand escalation, as Yang is lionized by the media.
10	"Interlude"; Transliteration: "Kansōkyoku" (Japanese: 間奏曲)
In Fezzan, Rubinsky warns of Alliance invasion plans. Despite objections, the Alliance approves a massive eight-fleet offensive, while Reinhard prepares to lure them into Imperial territory.
11	"The Verge of Death (Part One)"; Transliteration: "Shi no Kyōi (Zenpen)" (Japanese: 死の脅威 前編)
The Alliance pushes into Imperial space but faces scorched-earth tactics and severed supply lines. Kircheis isolates their fleets, while Reinhard readies a decisive counterstrike.
12	"The Verge of Death (Part Two)"; Transliteration: "Shi no Kyōi (Kōhen)" (Japanese: 死の脅威 後編)
Reinhard's forces devastate the Alliance's invasion fleets, forcing survivors to regroup at Amritsar. Both sides prepare for a massive confrontation.

== Die Neue These season 2 ==
Remake's second season, Stellar War (Japanese: 星乱, Seiran), comprises three animated films, recut to a 12-episode series. It covers the end of volume 1 of the original novels, as well as volume 2.

No.	Title
13	"Amritsar"; Transliteration: "Amurittsa" (Japanese: アムリッツァ)
In the wake of the failed Alliance invasion, the exhausted expeditionary force collides with Reinhard's concentrated armadas in the Amritsar Starzone. Yang Wen-li conducts a fighting withdrawal to save as many ships as possible, but Alliance losses are catastrophic, ceding the initiative to the Empire.
14	"Demise of the Emperor"; Transliteration: "Kōtei Hōgyo" (Japanese: 皇帝崩御)
Kaiser Friedrich IV dies without naming an heir; to block the powerful Braunschweig and Littenheim houses, Minister Lichtenlade enthrones the five-year-old Erwin Josef II. The court split hardens into rival factions, with Reinhard's rise accelerating amid looming civil war.
15	"Before the Storm"; Transliteration: "Arashi no Mae" (Japanese: 嵐の前)
The high nobles coalesce as the Lippstadt League while Reinhard consolidates his command and prepares for their challenge. On the Alliance side, political tremors foreshadow fresh unrest as ideologues and opportunists circle.
16	"Ignition Point"; Transliteration: "Hakkaten" (Japanese: 発火点)
The nobles' intrigues flare into open confrontation: arrests, plots and brinkmanship trigger the Empire's slide into civil war. Reinhard commits his fleets; the Lippstadt League arrays its strength around Geiersburg Fortress.
17	"The Yang Fleet Mobilises"; Transliteration: "Yan Kantai Shutsudō" (Japanese: ヤン艦隊出動)
In the Alliance, a coup by the National Salvation Military Council seizes Heinessen and suspends democracy; Trünicht goes to ground. Yang resolves to resist the junta and sorties from Iserlohn with the Yang Fleet to suppress the revolt.
18	"Bloodshed in Space"; Transliteration: "Ryūketsu no Uchū" (Japanese: 流血の宇宙)
Mittermeyer crushes Staden at Altena and helps seize Rentenberg Fortress, but Ovlesser's brutal defense forces a bloody boarding action. Returned to Geiersburg as a political ploy, Ovlesser is executed by Braunschweig, spreading paranoia through the Lippstadt camp.
19	"The Battle of the Doria Starzone"; Transliteration: "Dōria Seiki no Kaisen" (Japanese: ドーリア星域の会戦)
The NSMC dispatches Baghdash to assassinate Yang, but he ends up sidelined as the Yang Fleet encircles the Alliance 11th Fleet at Doria and annihilates it after refused surrenders. A mass protest on Heinessen turns into a massacre, strengthening support for Yang's advance on the capital.
20	"Tragedy"; Transliteration: "Sangeki" (Japanese: 惨劇)
Littenheim's 50,000-ship sally is routed by Kircheis at Kyffhäuser; fleeing, he fires on his own men and is killed by his enraged troops. After an uprising on Westerland, Braunschweig orders nuclear extermination—an atrocity that will ruin the nobles politically.
21	"Victory for Whose Sake?"; Transliteration: "Dare ga Tame no Shōri" (Japanese: 誰がための勝利)
Yang disables the Artemis Necklace with ice-ramming tactics and forces the junta's surrender; Greenhill and Lynch die as evidence is destroyed. Democracy is restored—yet Trünicht returns to power with Terraist help, while Fezzan quietly recruits Boris Konev.
22	"The Fall of Goldenbaum"; Transliteration: "Ōgonju wa Taoreta" (Japanese: 黄金樹は倒れた)
With public outrage after Westerland, the Lippstadt League makes a final sortie from Geiersburg and is decisively beaten. Braunschweig is forced to commit suicide by his retainer Ansbach; Merkatz spares his men and chooses exile over death.
23	"Farewell to the Days of Old"; Transliteration: "Saraba, Tōki Hi" (Japanese: さらば、遠き日)
At a victory reception, Ansbach's coffin-gun assassination attempt kills Kircheis while sparing Reinhard. Reinhard's admirals seize the Imperial Seal and arrest Lichtenlade, whom Reinhard later compels to suicide, even as Annerose departs—leaving Reinhard to rule alone.
24	"My Friend"; Transliteration: "Waga Tomo" (Japanese: わが友)
In Heinessen, Yang must publicly embrace the restored government; he sponsors Merkatz's asylum as "guest admiral" at Iserlohn and mourns Jessica. On Odin, Reinhard becomes duke and prime minister while honoring Kircheis posthumously; on Terra, the Church proclaims its long plot is nearing fruition.

== Die Neue These season 3 ==
The third season, Collision (Japanese: 激突, Gekitotsu), also comprises three animated films, cut into a 12-episode series. It covers the majority of volume 3 of the original novels.

No.	Title
25	"First Campaign"; Transliteration: "Uijin" (Japanese: 初陣)
January 798 UC: Dusty Attenborough leads a trainee squadron into Imperial space and is ambushed by Eihendorf's fleet. Outnumbered, the rookies—including Julian Mintz on his first sortie—struggle until Yang Wen-li arrives with the Iserlohn Garrison Fleet to turn the tide.
26	"The Twin Pillars"; Transliteration: "Sōheki" (Japanese: 双璧)
Admirals Mittermeyer and Reuenthal recall the 795 UC Klopstock Incident, when an exiled noble attempted to assassinate the Kaiser. Mittermeyer's execution of a looting officer nearly saw him court-martialed, but Reuenthal secured Reinhard von Müsel's help, pledging their loyalty in exchange for Mittermeyer's freedom.
27	"A Stormy Night"; Transliteration: "Arashi no Yoru" (Japanese: 嵐の夜)
On a stormy night, Reuenthal appeals directly to Reinhard and Kircheis to save Mittermeyer from punishment. Reinhard agrees, gaining his first allies beyond Kircheis. In the present, Reinhard continues consolidating his command by elevating loyal commoner officers over entrenched nobles.
28	"Reformer"; Transliteration: "Kaikakusha" (Japanese: 改革者)
After Kircheis's death, Reinhard devotes himself to sweeping reforms of the Empire, winning public support even from skeptics. Meanwhile, Hilmer von Schaft proposes turning Geiersburg Fortress into a mobile base; Reinhard entrusts the plan to Kempff with Müller as deputy.
29	"The Geier Takes Flight"; Transliteration: "Habataku Gaie" (Japanese: はばたく禿鷹ガイエ)
Work begins to convert Geiersburg Fortress into a mobile fortress. On 17 March 798 UC the warp test succeeds, enabling deployment against Iserlohn. Meanwhile, Julian is welcomed at the Cazerne household, where Alex warns Yang that the Alliance government may ultimately turn against him.
30	"A Single Fine Thread"; Transliteration: "Hosoi Ippon no Ito" (Japanese: 細い一本の糸)
In Fezzan, Rubinsky reveals to Terraists his plan to let Reinhard destroy both the Alliance and Goldenbaum dynasty before toppling him. Rupert Kesserling enlists allies, including Count Remscheid and ex-Lippstadt nobles Schumacher and Landsberg, in plots against both sides.
31	"What Was Lost"; Transliteration: "Ushinawareta Mono" (Japanese: 失われたもの)
At Hildegard's request, Ernest Mecklinger visits her cousin Baron Kümmel. Meanwhile, Reinhard approves the Geiersburg plan. As construction proceeds, political intrigue deepens across Empire, Alliance, and Fezzan, with shadow networks preparing to manipulate the coming conflict.
32	"The Inquiry"; Transliteration: "Samonkai" (Japanese: 査問会)
Yang is summoned to a dubious inquiry on Heinessen, separated from his companions and questioned about his loyalty. Meanwhile, Geiersburg Fortress warps into the Iserlohn Corridor, raising alarm as Yang remains trapped far from the front.
33	"War Without Weapons"; Transliteration: "Buki Naki Tatakai" (Japanese: 武器なき戦い)
Frederica seeks Bewcock and Rebelo's help to find Yang, uncovering how the Alliance government censors opposition and controls the media. As Imperial invasion news arrives, the inquiry is suspended and Yang is belatedly dispatched back toward Iserlohn.
34	"Fortress vs Fortress Act I: Cannon Fire"; Transliteration: "Yōsai tai Yōsai Akt I: Kyohō, Aiutsu" (Japanese: 要塞対要塞 Akt I: 巨砲、相撃つ)
Geiersburg Fortress enters firing range and exchanges main-cannon volleys with Iserlohn, causing mutual damage. Imperial fighters lure out Iserlohn's floating batteries while Müller maneuvers his fleet to attack from the rear, setting up a ground assault.
35	"Fortress vs Fortress Act II: Fierce Fighting"; Transliteration: "Yōsai tai Yōsai Akt II: Gekitō" (Japanese: 要塞対要塞 Akt II: 激闘)
Imperial panzergrenadiers breach Iserlohn's outer wall but are routed by the Rosen Ritter. Merkatz lures Müller's covering fleet into a trap, inflicting heavy casualties before Kempff dispatches reinforcements to extract them.
36	"Fortress vs Fortress Act III: The Return of the Magician"; Transliteration: "Yōsai tai Yōsai Akt III: Majutsushi no Kikan" (Japanese: 要塞対要塞 Akt III: 魔術師の帰還)
Reinhard criticizes Kempff's caution, believing both fortresses should have been destroyed outright. Yang, returning with reinforcements, shares the same view. Kempff attempts a feigned retreat to lure Iserlohn, but Julian discerns the trap, allowing Yang and Merkatz to counterattack.

== Die Neue These season 4 ==
The fourth season, Intrigue (Japanese: 策謀, Sakubō), comprises three animated films, again cut into a 12-episode series. It covers the end of volume 3 of the original novels, as well as volume 4.

No.	Title
37	"Fortress vs Fortress Act IV: Conclusion"; Transliteration: "Yōsai tai Yōsai Akt IV: Ketchaku" (Japanese: 要塞対要塞 Akt IV: 決着)
Kempff attempts to ram Geiersburg Fortress into Iserlohn, but Yang concentrates fire on an exposed thruster, causing it to spin out of control and be destroyed by the Thor Hammer. Kempff dies in the explosion while Müller is badly injured. Overzealous Alliance officers pursue the retreating Imperials, only to be annihilated by Mittermeyer and Reuenthal's reinforcement fleet.
38	"Determination and Ambition"; Transliteration: "Ketsui to Yashin" (Japanese: 決意と野心)
In Fezzan, Rupert Kesserling reports the Alliance's imminent collapse, revealing himself as Rubinsky's illegitimate son. In Odin, Reinhard rages at the defeat but forgives Müller, while arresting Hilmer von Schaft for corruption. Kempff is given a state funeral, and Reuenthal quietly voices his discontent to Mittermeyer. At Iserlohn, Yang reflects with Julian on how military power often harms the people it claims to protect.
39	"Thunderclaps"; Transliteration: "Raimai" (Japanese: 雷鳴)
Ulrich Kesler warns Reinhard of Landsberg and Schumacher's suspicious return. Hildegard deduces they intend to abduct the young Kaiser and persuades Annerose to allow tighter security. Reinhard confronts Fezzan commissioner Boltik, who admits the plan will justify Imperial intervention in the Alliance, provided Fezzan controls interstellar trade.
40	"Maze"; Transliteration: "Meikyū" (Japanese: 迷宮)
Reinhard deliberately allows Fezzan's scheme to proceed. During a diversion, Landsberg and Schumacher infiltrate Neue Sanssouci through underground passages and kidnap Kaiser Erwin Josef II, spiriting him away under Fezzan's protection.
41	"The Die Is Cast"; Transliteration: "Ya wa Hanatareta" (Japanese: 矢は放たれた)
The kidnapping of Kaiser Erwin Josef II is reported to Reinhard, who orders preparations for war. Vice Admiral Molt commits suicide in disgrace, while Hildegard confronts Reinhard over his complicity. In Fezzan, Kesserling arranges for the emperor's arrival and deepens his plots, even as suspicions rise over Boltik's dealings.
42	"The Legitimate Galactic Empire Government"; Transliteration: "Ginga Teikoku Seitō Seifu" (Japanese: 銀河帝国正統政府)
Job Trunicht proclaims that the young emperor and Imperial defectors are under Alliance protection. Count Remscheid forms a government-in-exile with himself as prime minister and Merkatz as unwilling minister of war. Reinhard denounces the Alliance's actions as illegal, effectively declaring war.
43	"Declaration of War"; Transliteration: "Sensen Fukoku" (Japanese: 宣戦布告)
Alliance opinion is divided over harboring the emperor, but Trunicht seizes the crisis to strengthen his grip on power, reorganizing the military. Amid the reshuffle, Julian Mintz is appointed as a military attaché to Fezzan, setting the stage for his new mission.
44	"Departure"; Transliteration: "Tabidachi" (Japanese: 旅立ち)
Yang predicts Fezzan may side with the Empire for religious or ideological reasons. Julian volunteers to travel there as his eyes and ears, accompanied by Louis Machungo. At Iserlohn, staff bid Julian farewell as Merkatz reluctantly joins the exiled government's cabinet.
45	"Emperor Overthrown"; Transliteration: "Kōtei Hairitsu" (Japanese: 皇帝廃立)
Reinhard's declaration of war galvanizes Imperial enlistments. He discusses invading through Fezzan and authorizes Oberstein to restore the secret police under Heydrich Lang. Meanwhile, infant Katharin Kätchen is crowned as Kaiserin in Odin, a symbolic move to delegitimize the "exile government."
46	"Operation: Ragnarök"; Transliteration: "Sakusenmei "Ragunarokku"" (Japanese: 作戦名『神々の黄昏ラグナロック』)
Julian arrives on Fezzan, quietly spreading warnings of Imperial designs. On 8 November 798 UC, Reinhard announces Operation Ragnarök: diversionary attacks on Iserlohn by Reuenthal, Lennenkampf and Lutz, while Mittermeyer, Müller, Steinmetz, Wahlen and Reinhard himself lead the main thrust through Fezzan.
47	"Invitation to a Requiem"; Transliteration: "Rekuiemu e no Shōtai" (Japanese: 鎮魂曲レクイエムへの招待)
Bewcock warns the Alliance government of an imminent Fezzan Corridor invasion but is ignored. Reuenthal besieges Iserlohn, disabling the Thor Hammer with missiles and forcing the garrison into a costly battle. Yang's feint allows the Rosen Ritter to board Reuenthal's flagship before withdrawing, leaving the fight indecisive as the main Imperial offensive begins.
48	"The Occupation of Fezzan"; Transliteration: "Fezān Senryō" (Japanese: フェザーン占領)
Mittermeyer invades Fezzan, seizing Alliance data before Julian and allies flee. Kesserling attempts to overthrow Rubinsky but is killed instead, forcing Rubinsky into hiding. The Empire consolidates control, executing looters and securing maps of Alliance space, while Yang braces for the next phase of war.
