= List of animated television series of 1993 =

This is a list of animated television series first aired in 1993.

Animated television series first aired in 1993
Title	Seasons	Episodes	Country	Year	Original channel	Technique	Notes
2 Stupid Dogs	2	26	United States	1993–95	TBS	Traditional	
The Adventures of Blinky Bill	3	78	Australia	1993–2004	Australian Broadcasting Corporation (1993–95); ABC Kids (1993–2013); Seven Network (2004–05)	Traditional	
Adventures of Sonic the Hedgehog	1	65	United States	1993	Syndication	Traditional	Version of Sonic the Hedgehog
Albert the Fifth Musketeer	1	26	United Kingdom; France; Canada; Germany; United States; China	1993	Children's BBC; Canal+ YTV; Teletoon	Traditional	
All-New Dennis the Menace	1	13	United States; Italy; Spain	1993	CBS; Telecinco	Traditional	Version of Dennis the Menace
The Animals of Farthing Wood	3	39	United Kingdom; France	1993–95	BBC One	Traditional	
Animaniacs (1993)	5	99	United States	1993–98	Fox (1993–94); The WB (1995–98)	Traditional	Spin-off of Tiny Toon Adventures
Avenger Penguins	2	26	United Kingdom	1993–94	ITV (CITV)	Traditional	
Baby Follies	1	52	France	1993–94	Canal+	Traditional	
Beavis and Butt-Head	11	274	United States	1993–present	MTV (1993–97; 2011); Paramount+ (2022–present)	Traditional (Season 1-8); Flash (Season 9-present)	Spin-off of Liquid Television
Biker Mice from Mars (1993)	3	65	United States	1993–96	Syndication	Traditional	
The Blue Mouse and the Big Faced Cat	2	69	China	1993–2000	CCTV	Traditional	
Bonkers	1	65	United States	1993–94	The Disney Channel (1993); Syndication (1993–94)	Traditional	Spinoff of Raw Toonage
The Bots Master	1	40	France; United States; Canada	1993–94	YTV; Syndication; TF1; Mangas	Traditional	
Cadillacs and Dinosaurs	1	13	United States; Canada	1993–94	CBS; YTV	Traditional	Based on Comic book
Chip & Charly	1	26	France	1993	Canal J	Traditional	
Chipie & Clyde	1	26	France	1993	Canal+	CGI	
Cholong-iui Yesnal-Yeohaeng	1	52	South Korea	1993–94	KBS2	Traditional	
Coup de bleu dans les étoiles	1	13	France	1993	Canal+	Traditional	
Cro	2	21	United States	1993–94	ABC	Traditional	
Dig & Dug with Daisy	1	16	United Kingdom	1993	Channel 4 Tiny Pop; Channel 5	Stop-Motion	
Double Dragon	2	26	United States; Italy	1993–94	Syndication; Italia 1 Telecinco	Traditional	
Droopy, Master Detective	1	13	United States	1993	Fox Kids	Traditional	Spin-off of Tom & Jerry Kids
Exosquad	2	52	United States	1993–94	Syndication	Traditional	
Family Dog	1	10	United States; Canada	1993	CBS	Traditional	Spin-off of Amazing Stories
Gargantua	1	26	France	1993	France 3	Traditional	
Gogs	2	13	Wales	1993–98	S4C	Stop-Motion	
Hurricanes	5	65	United Kingdom; United States	1993–97	Syndication; ITV	Traditional	
The Itsy Bitsy Spider	2	26	United States	1993–96	USA Network	Traditional	
Journey to the Heart of the World	1	26	France; Belgium	1993–94	Canal+ / France 3 RTBF	Traditional	
The Legends of Treasure Island	2	26	United Kingdom	1993–95	ITV	Traditional	
Lisa und Paul	1	13	Germany	1993	ZDF	Traditional	
Mabeobsa-ui Adeul Cory	1	13	South Korea	1993	KBS2	Traditional	
Madeline	3	59	United States; Canada; France	1993–2001	Global Television Network, Family Channel and FR3 (specials 2–6); The Family Channel (season 1); ABC (season 2); Playhouse Disney (season 3)	Traditional	Version of Madeline
Marsupilami	1	13	United States	1993–94	CBS	Traditional	Based on the Belgian Comic Book character, spinoff of Raw Toonage
Meena	1	37	Bangladesh	1993	Bangladesh Television	Traditional	
Mighty Max	2	40	United States	1993–94	Syndication	Traditional	Based on toyline
Les Mille et Une Nuits	1	13	France	1993	France 2	Traditional	
Mine de rien	1	40	France	1993	Canal J	Traditional	
The Moxy Show	1	24	United States	1993–96	Cartoon Network	CGI	Compilation (mostly) anthology series
The New Adventures of Speed Racer	1	13	United States	1993	First-run syndication	Traditional	Spin-off of Speed Racer
Old Bear Stories	3	41	United Kingdom	1993–97	ITV Network; Channel 5	Stop-Motion	
Orson and Olivia	1	26	Italy; France	1993	TF1	Traditional	
Ottos Ottifanten	1	13	Germany	1993	RTL	Traditional	
Papa Beaver's Storytime	3	156	France; Canada	1993–2002	Family Channel; Canal J France 3	Traditional	
Philbert Frog	1	13	United Kingdom	1993	CBBC; TCC	Traditional	
The Pink Panther	2	60	United States	1993–95	Syndication	Traditional	Version of The Pink Panther
Problem Child	2	26	United States; Spain (season 1); Canada (season 2)	1993–94	USA Network	Traditional	Spin-off of the film Problem Child
Rocko's Modern Life	4	52	United States	1993–96	Nickelodeon	Traditional	
Rubbish, King of the Jumble	2	26	United Kingdom	1993–94	ITV	Traditional	
Sonic the Hedgehog	2	26	United States	1993–94	ABC	Traditional	Version of Sonic the Hedgehog
Spirou	2	52	France	1993–95	Canal J	Traditional	
Stone Protectors	1	13	United States; United Kingdom; France	1993	Syndication	Traditional	
Super Secret Secret Squirrel	1	13	United States	1993	TBS	Traditional	B-segment of 2 Stupid Dogs
SWAT Kats: The Radical Squadron	2	26	United States	1993–95	TBS	Traditional	
Tales from the Cryptkeeper	3	39	United States; Canada; France (season 3)	1993–99	Teletoon (season 3); ABC (seasons 1–2); CBS (season 3)	Traditional	Spin-off of Tales from the Crypt
Tales of the Tooth Fairies	1	26	United Kingdom; France; Germany; Belgium	1993	BBC One	Traditional	
The Terrible Thunderlizards	4	36	United States; Canada	1993–97	Fox Kids; YTV	Traditional	Segment of Eek! the Cat
Theodore Tugboat	5	130	Canada	1993–2001	CBC	Traditional	
VeggieTales	3	50	United States	1993–2015	Direct-to-video	CGI	Direct to Video Series before airing reruns on television.
Zoe and Charlie	1	26	Canada; France	1993	Canal+	Traditional	

Anime television series first aired in 1993

Title	Seasons	Episodes	Country	Year	Original channel	Technique
Aoki Densetsu Shoot!	1	58	Japan	1993–94	AT-X	Traditional
The Brave Express Might Gaine	1	47	Japan	1993–94	ANN	Traditional
Ghost Sweeper Mikami	1	45	Japan	1993–94	ANN	Traditional
Heisei Inu Monogatari Bow	1	40	Japan	1993–94		Traditional
The Irresponsible Captain Tylor	1	26	Japan	1993	TXN	Traditional
Jungle King Tar-chan	1	50	Japan	1993–94		Traditional
Kenyū Densetsu Yaiba	1	52	Japan	1993–94	TXN	Traditional
Little Women II: Jo's Boys	1	40	Japan	1993		Traditional
Miracle Girls	1	51	Japan	1993		Traditional
Mobile Suit Victory Gundam	1	51	Japan	1993–94		Traditional
Muka Muka Paradise	1	51	Japan	1993–94		Traditional
Nekketsu Saikyō Go-Saurer	1	51	Japan	1993–94		Traditional
Nintama Rantarō	31	2426+	Japan	1993–present		Traditional
Pokonyan!	1	170	Japan	1993–96		Traditional
Sailor Moon R	1	43	Japan	1993–94		Traditional
Shima Shima Tora no Shimajirō		726	Japan	1993–2008		Traditional
Shippū! Iron Leaguer	1	52	Japan	1993–94		Traditional
Slam Dunk	1	101	Japan	1993–96	ANN	Traditional
Tama of Third Street: Do You Know My Tama?	2	35	Japan	1993–94		Traditional

== See also ==
- List of animated feature films of 1993
- List of Japanese animation television series of 1993
