= List of Miracle Girls episodes =

The episodes of the Miracle Girls anime are based on the manga series of the same name written by Nami Akimoto. They are directed by Hiroko Tokita and Takashi Anno, and produced by Japan Taps. The plot of the episodes follow Tomomi and Mikage Matsunaga, telepathic twins with the power to teleport whenever they are together, and their day-to-day lives living with psychic powers alongside typical school and teenage problems.

Three pieces of theme music are used for the episodes: two opening themes and one closing theme. The opening theme for the first 29 episodes is "KISU no Tochuu de Namida ga" by GARDEN. The opening theme for the last 22 episodes is "Koi no Mirai" by GARDEN, and the ending theme for all 51 episodes is "Futari ja Nakya Dame na no" by Dio.

== Episode list ==
No.	Title	Original release date
1	"Cloudy, Then Mikage"; Transliteration: "Kumori No Chi Mikage" (Japanese: 曇りのちみかげ)	January 8, 1993
Tomomi and Mikage are twin high school girls with powers hidden to everyone but themselves and their boyfriends: They can communicate with each other telepathically, and if they hold hands, they can teleport. Tomomi, the elder twin, is a tomboy with a knack for sports, and Mikage, the younger twin, is a brilliant academic and is in the chemistry club. One day, they receive big news: Mikage's boyfriend, Kurashige, is transferring to England to further his education; in addition, the ESP fanatic Kageura, the chemistry teacher, is getting married. Though she is initially heartbroken, Mikage recovers and wishes Kurashige well. At Kageura's wedding reception, Kurashige gives her a pocketwatch as a going-away gift. Meanwhile, four flowers, two in England outside of a castle and two in Japan outside of the twins' house, suddenly begin to shine and bloom.
2	"Rain with a Chance of Hijack"; Transliteration: "Ame Tokidoki Haijakku" (Japanese: 雨ときどきハイジャック)	January 15, 1993
Kurashige is at the airport, preparing to leave for England. Tomomi and her boyfriend, Noda, are there to see him off, but Mikage is running late. As Mikage sprints out of a flower shop in the airport with a small bouquet, she bumps into a man in a suit and sunglasses, knocking him aside and falling to the floor. Both of them drop envelopes, and each pick one up before leaving. Mikage makes it just in time to give the bouquet and letter to Kurashige. On the plane, Kurashige greets the person next to him, a young English woman with short red hair and glasses. As the flight proceeds, Kurashige starts to read the letter Mikage gives him, but realizes that something is strange: The letter appears to be a threat from hijackers calling themselves The Messiah. Before he can finish reading the letter, the hijackers, one of them being the man Mikage bumped into earlier, take control of the plane with threats of gun violence. Back in Japan, the twins learn of the hijacking through a phone call from Noda and information on the news. On the plane, the hijackers make it into the cockpit and force him to contact ground control in order to broadcast their message. However, when the pilot starts reading aloud the letter he's handed, it becomes clear that it's a love letter. The hijackers quickly stop the broadcast and find out that Kurashige has the real letter when he tries to grab the love letter. They shoot at him, wounding him in the shoulder. Sensing danger, Mikage and Tomomi hold hands, and through an unusual display of power, teleport onto the plane. Though they teleport back home almost immediately, the burst of energy caused by their appearance is enough to distract the hijackers long enough for the passengers to subdue them. The twins make it back home, and Kurashige's flight lands safely in England. In the castle previously seen in the background, a young woman with long hair resembling the one from the plane is watching a broadcast of the plane's landing. She pauses the screen as her look-alike appears and smiles to herself, nodding knowingly to a man with blonde hair, black clothes, and sunglasses sitting nearby.
3	"The Wind Blows Towards London"; Transliteration: "Kazamuki wa Rondon" (Japanese: 風向きはロンドン)	January 22, 1993
At school, Mikage is dazed and distracted, upset by the absence of Kurashige, while Tomomi is unsatisfied with the quality of the pictures of her that are supposed to end up in the yearbook. In an empty classroom, Tomomi teleports Mikage home so she can rest, and they are nearly caught by Kageura, who is convinced the girls have psychic abilities but is unable to prove it. That evening, the girls' father picks the strange flowers from the yard and places them in their room in a vase. In England, Kurashige and the young woman with glasses from the plane are chatting; he tells her he is travelling to study, and she says she is there to care for a sick relative. The flowers by the castle have been discovered, and a team of scientists set up all sorts of surveillance equipment, from video cameras to bioactivity sensors, which are sent to the castle to be read by the young woman with long hair and the blonde man. The man explains that the flower's signature doesn't match any known species, saying that it may be the flower of legend. The woman remarks that she needs to find her younger twin sister, Emma. A lightning bolt strikes the castle and sends a huge jolt of electricity into the flowers, causing the equipment to be destroyed. Back in Japan, the flowers in the twins' room start glowing brightly, and their energy causes the sleeping Mikage to float above her bed, to Tomomi's shock. The light dies down, and she falls back to her bed. The next day, Mikage is shown studying in the library, searching for the flowers in several books on botany. While getting a drink from the vending machine, a vision of Kurashige in London, crossing a busy street, appears in front of her. Outside of the castle, an old man describes to his grandson the legend of the Twin Princesses, describing how the flowers will allow the twins of light to unleash the power of heaven and drive all shadow from the world, bathing the world in light. In the castle, the young woman sees a vision of her twin sister, Emma, who likewise sees her. Meanwhile, Mikage and Tomomi use their teleportation and the power of the flowers to appear psychically in London and outside of Noda's house respectively. Mikage walks with Kurashige for a while, and Tomomi laughs at Noda when she sees him sewing a teddy bear, but the power is broken when the other twins attempt to reach out and touch hands, and the girls return home. The next day, they have made the flowers into bracelets to keep them nearby, and Tomomi finally manages to turn in better pictures of herself for the yearbook.
4	"Bargain Typhoon"; Transliteration: "Baagen Taifuun" (Japanese: バーゲンタイフン)	January 29, 1993
While out shopping, Mikage finds a dress she loves, but it's far too expensive for her. Tomomi refuses to lend her money, so Mikage sets out to earn money on her own. She takes a job at a fast food restaurant, but is quickly fired when she insults a customer at the register and then blows up the stove. She then approaches Kageura and offers to let him tape proof of their psychic abilities for several thousand yen, but instead of showing their real powers, she and Tomomi try and fail to trick him with simple stage illusions, causing him to refuse to pay. When she returns to the mall, she learns that bargain day is approaching, which would allow her to afford the dress, and Tomomi a skirt she found. The girls, Noda, and Noda's friend Yamagishi hatch an elaborate plan to get the girls their clothes by wearing roller skates and blocking off the crowds at key points. Their plan nearly fails when the crowds overpower them, but Mikage manages to crawl through the group. As she searches for her dress, she calls Tomomi (who is looking for her skirt) telepathically for help, but as Tomomi is arguing with her, the flowers they wear pulse at an alarming rate and the world around them seems to disappear, making it appear as if they are all alone in the mall. As both girls suffer mild panic attacks, the flowers appear to shoot off a burst of energy, and things return to normal. Tomomi, Noda, and Yamagishi rush over to Mikage, who has recovered and manages to reach her dress. Unfortunately, she suddenly decides that she hates the neckline, and gives up on buying it. That evening, the girls wonder what happened with the flowers, but remain uncertain.
5	"Mikage, Briefly Tomomi"; Transliteration: "Mikage Ichiji Tomomi" (Japanese: みかげ一時ともみ)	February 5, 1993
Tomomi is trying to get dressed for a date with Noda, but has to have Mikage teleport her in a hurry because her jacket is still at the dry cleaner's. Due to landing in a construction site, Tomomi has to run back home and take a shower. Mikage teleports her again when she's ready, but this time she lands in the fountain where Noda is waiting for her, and she runs back home in tears after he laughs at her. When Noda comes by to check on her, Mikage chases him away. Later on, both Noda and Mikage attempt to connect with Tomomi about what happened, but Tomomi ignores them, running and then teleporting away from Noda at school. She goes so far as to clean the house from top to bottom to avoid talking about going on a date again. Finally, Tomomi agrees to go, getting Mikage to take her place for the first half of a volleyball game. After saying goodbye, she tags Mikage out and manages to win the game. In a side plot, an underclassman is asked by Kageura to secretly take photos of Tomomi in order to get evidence of her psychic abilities. Though the underclassman witnesses the girls teleporting, she ultimately decides not to say anything, and abandons Kageura.
6	"Fine Weather for Espers"; Transliteration: "Esupaa Biyori" (Japanese: エスパー日和)	February 12, 1993
In a laboratory late at night, Kageura is performing experiments to create life, and is interrupted by a package containing an allegedly mystical mask. The next evening, at his own house, he learns from a professor on the news about a legendary rock called the heavenly light stone, a deposit of which the professor believes exists on a nearby mountain. Back in his lab, he continues his experiments, but a lightning storm causes a freak power surge, which in turn causes an explosion when he uses electric rods. The mask from his package suddenly floats over to him and attaches itself to his face, laughing as it transfers a large amount of energy to his body, and then falls off, inanimate again. Kageura discovers that he has gained telekinesis from the accident, but decides to hide it from his students, later hinting to the twins that he understands their reluctance to show off and that powers of "people like them" are not to be shared lightly. When he shares the news to his wife and demonstrates his abilities, she just laughs and cheers, possibly under the impression that it's an elaborate magic trick. The next morning, he tries and fails to use his powers, but thinks that they still exist when his wife moves a bowl he was focusing on while his eyes are closed. He gets in touch with the professor from the news, and they go on a hike together so that he can detect the heavenly light stone with his newfound ESP. Meanwhile, the girls have noticed that their flowers appear to be weakening, changing color to dark blue instead of pink and yellow, and they place the bracelets in glasses of water to no avail. As Kageura appears to sense the rock and scales the mountain, the girls' flowers begin to glow again, and when they hold them, they are teleported to the mountain against their will. Kageura and the mountaintop are struck by lightning, crumbling part of the peak to bits and causing Kageura to fall. Two of the rock pieces strike the girls' flowers and are transformed into teardrop-shaped pendants, matching the flowers' colors. Kageura briefly gains the power of flight, which saves him from death, but falls quite a distance anyway when the power fades. The girls land safely in front of the mountain and realize that the flowers have healed thanks to the heavenly light stone that touched them. The next day at school, Kageura has gone back to his old ways, and harasses Mikage about her new jewelry, the girls having turned the pendants into necklaces.
7	"A Premonition Index of ?%"; Transliteration: "Yochi Shisuu Arere Paasento" (Japanese: 余地指数?パーセント)	February 19, 1993
Sunspots begin appearing at an unusually high rate, causing electromagnetic interference on Earth. Tomomi is trying to study for her chemistry exam so that she won't have to take the make-up and miss her date with Noda that weekend, but is unable to concentrate and can't remember a single formula. The next morning, the girls attempt to teleport to school, but instead of teleporting, a vision of bananas appears in front of them. As they make a run for it, Tomomi slips on a banana peel and falls. When they're about to cross the street, they hold hands, and another vision appears, this time of panties. As they cross, the wind blows up Mikage's skirt, flashing the street. In class, Tomomi is trying to study again, but Mikage interrupts her and asks to borrow some gym equipment. Tomomi offers to fly her home to get them, but once again, instead of teleporting, a vision appears, this time of goldfish swimming. Later, the girls are sitting outside when Kageura suddenly runs up, dragging a wagon full of water and goldfish behind him. He crashes into the girls and they go flying into the tank. That evening, the girls decide to make use of their newfound precognition by trying to get a glimpse of the chemistry exam so that Tomomi can pass. However, this time, they end up teleporting into Kageura's bedroom, and have to hurry out. The next day, they conclude that their precognition only works when they're sleep-deprived, and vow to stop sleeping as much as possible. Despite their mother's protests, they stay up late playing video games and exercising. Two evenings later, they again try to use precognition, but this time they teleport into Noda's room by mistake. They decide to give up and start sleeping again, but the next morning, the precognition finally works as desired, and they get a glimpse of the chemistry exam. Tomomi takes the exam and is the first to finish, but although she wrote down every correct answer, she mistakenly applied them to the wrong questions, causing Kageura to fail her. Luckily, Noda also ends up having to take the make-up exam, so she gets to spend time with him after all. Meanwhile, Mikage realizes that it was more likely the sunspots that caused the precognition, but decides not to tell Tomomi.
8	"A Chance of Scattered Tears"; Transliteration: "Tokoroni Yori Namida" (Japanese: ところにより涙)	February 26, 1993
On her way to school, Mikage hears a voice calling out for its mother. She spots a strange-looking kitten across the street and calls out to it telepathically to run when a truck is about to hit it. The kitten appears to hear her and goes to her. She once again hears a voice calling for its mother before the kitten runs away. After class, Mikage visits Kageura in his office and asks about his theories on telepathy. He explains that he believes that humans once had the ability to communicate telepathically, but the ability faded over time with the dominance of writing and speaking as communication; animals, however, retain that ability and continue to use it today. She visits a pet store and attempts to communicate with the animals there to no avail. On her way home that evening, she runs into the strange kitten again and hears it calling for its mother. She decides to take it home with her. The next morning, the girls learn from the news about a lioness and her cub who escaped from the zoo. As they realize that the kitten is actually a lion cub, it runs away in search of its mother. Meanwhile, the lioness is engaged in a chase down the streets, looking for her cub and fleeing from animal handlers, the police, and the media. The lioness is eventually cornered in a park and subdued with a tranquilizer and a net. Her cub forces its way through the crowd and cries out. Hearing it, the lioness shakes off her bonds and tries to reach it, but in the ensuing commotion, the lioness is shot and killed. The girls stop to cry on their way home that evening, but decide that they can't linger lest they make their own mother worry.
9	"Blizzard at the Ski Lodge"; Transliteration: "Rojji no Naka no Yukiarashi" (Japanese: ロッジの中の雪嵐)	March 5, 1993
The girls, Noda, and Yamagishi are taking a vacation to a ski lodge up in the mountains. In the town, a festival is being held to honor a local legend, a Yeti-like creature said to haunt the mountain. Unfortunately, at the ski lodge, the group runs into Daijoji, Mikage's smart but stuck-up classmate, who is there because her father runs the lodge. While trying to escape from her, the group accidentally bumps into a young woman admiring the snowman statue in the lobby: It's Emma, who has returned from England. Unknown to her, she is being pursued by two men in black suits and sunglasses, who have found her location and are on their way to the lodge. While playing in the snow, the group is forced to shelter in Daijoji's grandmother's house when a storm starts rolling in. Huddled around the fire, they discuss the legend of the snowman with Daijoji's grandmother, who mumbles a prayer to keep the snowman away. The men pursuing Emma attempt to break into the lodge at the same time an invisible, hulking figure bursts inside. As the group tries to barricade the doors and windows, the twins once again experience time freezing around them, this time seeing a vision of a white deer in the snow. Things return to normal; the grandmother's prayer appears to work, and the group succeeds in barricading the doors and windows. The men, however, have broken in successfully. Emma escapes by climbing out a window onto the roof, and though Noda and Yamagishi try to hold back the men, they are tied up and stuffed into a closet. While the twins free them, Emma jumps from the roof, landing safely in the snow, and runs away, the men still in hot pursuit. While all this is happening, Daijoji's grandmother insists on keeping the fire going. Meanwhile, Kageura and his wife are hiking in the snow to search for the snowman. They discover a cave with a small shrine and believe it to be the snowman's birthplace. When they return to their camp, they find that the wind has blown everything away, but Kageura blames it on the snowman. They become lost in the blizzard and manage to find the snowman's cave again, deciding to shelter there. They are forced to leave when the cave starts to collapse. At last, they make it to the grandmother's house, and collapse inside the front door.
10	"Avalanche Warning Announcement"; Transliteration: "Nadare Keihou Hatsurei" (Japanese: 雪崩警報発令)	March 12, 1993
Continued from last episode, the twins and Daijoji are in the kitchen making soup, and Noda and Yamagishi are searching for Emma in order to protect her. Meanwhile, Emma is walking up the mountain through the blizzard, with the men still following her. In town, the festival is in full swing, complete with a large ice sculpture of the snowman of legend. The howls of the real snowman disrupt the atmosphere, sending waves of energy over the mountain and town. After coming back to the house to put on hiking gear, Noda, Yamagishi, and Kageura go back out into the blizzard to look for Emma. The girls in the house warm themselves by the fire, but the lights suddenly go out and Daijoji panics, saying that it's the snowman. Daijoji's grandmother goes out into the snow and Tomomi and Kageura's wife, Rika, go after her. The old woman insists that the fire must be kept going at the spot she stopped at, or else disaster will fall. Mikage and Daijoji join them, and they all do their best to build a fire in the blizzard. Despite their efforts, the old woman claims that there is an avalanche coming. Places all over town are suddenly having heating problems, with heaters ceasing to work and water freezing in the bathtub. On the mountain, the men catch up to Emma, but are attacked by the group following them. In the forest, Mikage and Tomomi hold hands, and see another vision of the white deer. They are sent flying through unknown means, and as an avalanche bears down upon Noda and the others, the girls fly in front of it, their energy creating a wall so that the snow hits it and flies harmlessly over the group and the town. Emma recognizes them from the plane, and as she is later leaving, she thanks them for helping. Everyone returns home safely, singing karaoke on the bus.
11	"Timestream Storm Warning"; Transliteration: "Toki no Nagare no Chuuihou" (Japanese: ときの流れの注意報)	March 19, 1993
At a nearby park, an archaeological excavation is being done, and Mikage and Tomomi start having strange dreams of a woman in a blood-red sea. While in class, Mikage is dazed and distracted, doodling the same crescent-shaped object over and over in her notebook. When she goes home early due to a fever, Tomomi, with the help of a classmate, takes Mikage's drawing to an archaeologist, who identifies the item as a magatama, a spiritual charm worn in feudal Japan. He also mentions that there was no woman in the grave being excavated, but instead a man of high class. That evening, Mikage and Tomomi have another dream about the woman: She was in love with the young man, but was shunned and exiled, sent to sea in a boat to die on the ocean. The young woman tries to throw her magatama necklace to the young man on the shore, but the jewelry falls into the sea. The next day, Tomomi, with Noda's help, goes scuba diving and manages to find the necklace. She and Mikage place it with the young man to grant the young woman's wish from long ago, and their dreams stop.
12	"The Whirlwind in Tomomi's Heart"; Transliteration: "Tomomi no Mune no Tsumujikaze" (Japanese: ともみの胸の旋風)	March 26, 1993
Tomomi is pressured by a classmate into going to a concert with her. Though shy at first, Tomomi soon starts to enjoy herself, and catches the eye and guitar pick of one of the band members. Later, she starts dressing differently and listening to loud music, annoying Mikage and Noda. When she realizes that they've become annoyed by her behavior, she reflects and decides to go back to dressing the way she did before, and turns down her music. However, she does make Mikage go to the next concert with her.
13	"The Mysterious Migratory Love Cyclone"; Transliteration: "Nazo no Idousei Koikiatsu" (Japanese: 謎の移動性恋気圧)	April 2, 1993
Mikage is having recurring dreams where she is in a rowboat with Noda, and is about to tell him something when Tomomi interrupts. After an argument the girls have one night, they wake up in each other's bodies. Mikage is late to school since she spends time figuring out her predicament, while Tomomi goes to school as normal, ignoring the strange looks she gets as she does things that are normal for her but not for Mikage, such as attending her own classes. When the girls meet, they decide to act as each other for the time being, which unfortunately means that Mikage as Tomomi must go on a date with Noda in two days. On the day of the date, the girls teleport to the park; Mikage as Tomomi goes out on the lake in a rowboat with Noda, but luckily for Tomomi, nothing comes of the situation. When Mikage returns home, she realizes that she left Tomomi at the park, and hurries back. When the girls meet again, they return to their original bodies, having settled their differences.
14	"Miniature Typhoon Approaching"; Transliteration: "Mame Taifuun Sekkinchuu" (Japanese: 豆タイフン接近中)	April 9, 1993
Mikage is admiring herself in a store window when she hears someone calling her ugly. She yells at the nearest stranger, but he seems to be innocent, and she apologizes, wondering what happened. That evening, the girls' mother comments that strange things are happening at the hair salon she runs, such as items suddenly falling off of shelves. The girls volunteer to help out the next day, and experience the same phenomena. Thanks to telepathy, they realize that the culprit is the child of a frequent customer of the salon, a young boy with telekinesis and telepathy who is playing pranks and insulting the girls in his mind. The next day, the boy makes Noda trip when he's with Tomomi, and causes a bookshelf to crash on Kageura when he runs into Mikage at the bookstore. The girls pursue the boy and find him at his home, throwing things around the house in an emotional fit. They manage to calm him down by teleporting him to a rooftop where there's nothing to move with his mind. The boy confesses that he was lashing out because his mother spends little time with him due to her job and her new fiancé, but now that he knows there are other people like him in the world, he doesn't feel so lonely. He promises to stop playing pranks, but in the epilogue, he pulls one more joke by making his mother's hair float around while she's having it done.
15	"Irregular Cherry Front"; Transliteration: "Sakura Zensen Ijou Arai" (Japanese: 桜前線異常洗)	April 16, 1993
Mikage is running late to the school festival. On the way, her pocketwatch freezes, and she suddenly stops and crouches down in the middle of the road, clutching her head. After a moment, she gets up and runs to the school again, but another version of her remains behind. The first Mikage ends up locked inside a classroom by the chemistry club, who want to keep her away from their booth at the festival due to her tendency to blow things up. However, when the club gets to their booth, the second Mikage is already there, though she leaves right away. The first Mikage, meanwhile, escapes the classroom through a window. Eventually, both versions of Mikage end up running somewhere inside the school. They are seen by Kageura, who is baffled by the sight of two Mikages and pursues them. The second Mikage wanders around the festival, signing up for various clubs, notably the drama club with Daijoji and the track team with Tomomi. The first Mikage, on the other hand, forces her way into the chemistry club booth and blows something up right away. She is soon approached by Daijoji and Tomomi, who ask her why she is still with the chemistry club, and is confused when they say she signed up for their clubs. While getting a drink of water inside, Tomomi spots one of the Mikages staring up at a staircase. As she tries to talk to her, the other Mikage comes up from the bottom of the staircase, and the two meet face to face. Before anything can be resolved, Kageura spots them and gives chase, forcing all three girls to flee. The Mikages and Kageura end up running all around the school festival, and one of the Mikages upsets Daijoji's makeshift theater, causing her to join the chase. Yamagishi ends up pursuing one of the Mikages as well, adding to the chaos. Finally, Tomomi and the Mikages meet under the cherry tree where Mikage first split. The Mikages see a vision of Kurashige with the pocketwatch he gave as a gift, and the two Mikages fuse back into one.
16	"Sudden Spring Breeze"; Transliteration: "Haru Kaze To Kyuu" (Japanese: 春風と急)	April 23, 1993
The episode starts out with Tomomi winning a school marathon. As Tomomi freshens up, exhausted but happy, an upperclassman approaches her and hands her a box containing a pair of red shoes, which used to belong to a former student named Remi, who loved to run just like Tomomi. As Tomomi touches the shoes, she receives a vision of Remi running and drops the box in shock. Meanwhile, Remi, now a high school student, relaxes on the beach with her motorcycle and reminisces on her middle school days as an athlete. Tomomi puts on the shoes and receives another vision of Remi, this time hearing a scream. When she comes to, her feet start moving on their own, making her dash around the locker room . She is sent sprinting outside, running so fast that the Noda, Yamagishi, Mikage, and the upperclassman are unable to catch her. Tomomi eventually runs to Remi. Tomomi gives the shoes back to Remi and runs away, but Remi refuses them and chases after her. They eventually circle back to where Mikage and the upperclassman are.
17	"Stream of Memories"; Transliteration: "Omoide Kiryuu" (Japanese: 思い出気流)	April 30, 1993
Mikage tears apart her room searching for a bracelet she used to wear and asks Tomomi to help her out by teleporting them to where the bracelet is. They transport to an unfamiliar lot and spot a young girl running around wearing the bracelet, and decide to chase her down. Unknown to them, they have teleported to the past and are chasing a younger Tomomi. Meanwhile, the younger Mikage is happily wearing her own bracelet, showing it to her friends at school. The older twins ask around about the young girl with the bracelet, meeting but not recognizing younger versions of Noda, Yamagishi, and Kurashige. The younger Mikage, meanwhile, goes to a playground and sees Daijoji playing on the only working swing. Daijoji offers to let her have the swing in exchange for her bracelet. When Mikage refuses, Daijoji chases her around the playground until she corners her at the chainlink fence. In a scuffle, Mikage's bracelet snaps and the pieces scatter into the river just outside. Daijoji runs away, and Mikage goes home crying. The older twins finally realize where they are and chase the younger Tomomi to where Mikage is. There, they remember that Tomomi gave her bracelet to Mikage to comfort her. Satisfied, the twins return to the present, and Mikage proceeds to wreck Tomomi's room looking for the bracelet.
18	"A Moonlit Night's Unicorn"; Transliteration: "Tsukiyo No Unicorn" (Japanese: 月夜のユニコーン)	May 7, 1993
Mikage and Tomomi are visiting an art gallery with Noda and Yamagishi in hopes of viewing some paintings by Kurashige. While looking for Tomomi, Mikage spots a painting of a green unicorn and stares at it, transfixed. Tomomi finds her and takes her away to look at Kurashige's paintings. Mikage likes them, but is sad that they all seem to be of London until Tomomi points out that he did one of her glowing in the sunlight. That evening, Mikage dreams about meeting the unicorn from the art gallery and going to the park to pick flowers with it. The next morning, she finds the flower from her dream next to her pillow. In class, she has a vision of the unicorn, and promises it that she will play with it after the test. She finishes the test quickly but accurately, handing it in to Kageura and leaving early. She goes to the roof and plays with the unicorn, but when Tomomi and Noda come up to the roof, they find her fast asleep. When she wakes up, she becomes sad upon realizing that the unicorn is gone. That night, Tomomi realizes that Mikage is missing and looks out of the open window to see her running down the street. She goes off after her. She eventually finds Mikage asleep in the middle of a pool of light in the art gallery, having dreamed of the unicorn once more, this time asking it to take her to London. Tomomi tries and fails to wake her up. In her dream, Mikage rides the unicorn, and hears a voice saying that no matter where they are, they see the same moon. She wakes up to find that Tomomi is carrying her home. The following day, while Mikage sleeps through class, Tomomi researches unicorns and finds that legend says that they can appear in dreams by moonlight. That evening, Tomomi sees the unicorn along with Mikage. They both dream of riding the unicorn to London and saying hello to Kurashige. When they wake up, Mikage is finally comforted, and no longer sad when thinking about how far away Kurashige is.
19	"Desperate Cry"; Transliteration: "Kiri Ni Yobu Koe" (Japanese: 切に呼ぶ声)	May 14, 1993
Yamagishi tags along with Tomomi and Noda on their date, demanding that they go to the dinosaur museum. At the museum, Yamagishi tries to impress Tomomi with his knowledge of dinosaurs, but she is distracted by a vision of flying over a prehistoric jungle when she touches a fossil of the first bird. When Yamagishi leans on an egg, it appears to crack, allowing a full-grown brontosaurus to emerge. However, only he, Noda, and Tomomi can see it; it is invisible and intangible to everyone else. The dinosaur walks through the museum wall and vanishes into the city. The three go after it, chasing it through the town. Meanwhile, after Mikage sees a vision of a prehistoric sea upon touching an ammonite fossil, she goes off in search of fossils around the town. After some searching, she finds amber at the base of a tree with a fern leaf trapped inside. She is approached by a little girl, who offers to show her something even more interesting. The girl brings her to a cave and shows her a fossil of a large fish, which shows Mikage a vision of it when it was alive. Mikage promises to keep it a secret. As the girl runs off, the brontosaurus approaches Mikage, and though she is frightened it doesn't attack her, but only licks the amber and then leaves. Mikage meets up with the others. Tomomi explains that the dinosaur is probably lonely since it's the only one of its kind around anymore. The dinosaur is attracted to the sea by a ship's foghorn. The girls teleport to the top of a lighthouse to say goodbye to it; the boys join them by running up the stairs. At the end, Noda and the girls remember that it's Yamagishi's birthday, and Mikage gives him the amber as a gift.
20	"Hurricane in a Girl's Heart"; Transliteration: "Otome Gokoroha Hurricane" (Japanese: 乙女心はハリケーン)	May 21, 1993
Kageura is once again trying and failing to get his ESP research addressed by local media. Meanwhile, a hurricane is on its way, and Tomomi and Mikage suddenly faint in class. When Kageura confronts Mikage about her powers, she offers to show them to him, and later tells Tomomi about it, saying that she felt like messing with him. Tomomi reminds Mikage that their powers are special and only they and their boyfriends know about it, but Mikage doesn't care and thinks they'll feel relieved to finally show them off. Kageura manages to get a TV crew set up to record the girls' powers. Because the TV event coincides with Tomomi's date with Noda, Mikage offers to teleport her there. However, as they try to teleport, being filmed by the crew, the storm causes a spiral of energy to form above them, knocking out both of the girls. Noda runs to them and checks on Tomomi, who tells him she loves him before passing out. The next day, Mikage wonders what came over her yesterday, Tomomi doesn't remember saying anything, and Kageura is frustrated when he finds out that the camera crew only captured the tower of light and not the twins.
21	"Follow the South by Southwest Course"; Transliteration: "Nannansei No Shinrowo Tore" (Japanese: 南南西の進路をトレ)	May 28, 1993
On a class hiking trip, Mikage becomes tired and refuses to walk anymore, insisting that she and Tomomi use their powers to teleport to the top of the mountain. The two of them walk away from the group to teleport in private, but Noda catches them and runs towards them, telling them not to do it. He crashes into them at the moment of teleportation, causing him to teleport as well. Due to the mishap, Mikage and Noda end up in a random spot on the mountain, and Tomomi ends up in another spot. The girls check on each other using telepathy and decide to try to meet at the top. After a while, Mikage and Noda run into Tomomi, and when the bushes start rustling behind them, the three of them fall off a cliff, startled, but manage to teleport away before hitting the river. They wind up next to the bus, where they are found by the school principal, who had been looking for them with Kageura. Everyone makes it home on the bus safely, except for Kageura, who is mistakenly left behind.
22	"A Mirage of First Love"; Transliteration: "Hatsukoi Ha Shinkirou" (Japanese: 初恋は蜃気楼)	June 4, 1993
The twins are watching a romantic movie at the theater. While leaving, Mikage reminisces about Kurashige. She ends up tripping and skinning her knee when a scarf blows into her face. The owner of the scarf, an old woman, apologizes and uses her handkerchief to bandage Mikage's knee. The next day, Mikage meets the old lady and returns the handkerchief. The old woman tells her the story of the scarf: It was given to her by her first love, a young man she met at a dance many years ago, and whom she never saw again. The twins decide to try to find the woman's first love, but after much fruitless searching, they end up using their powers by trying to teleport to where he is. They end up in a hotel room and are forced to hide when someone approaches. Eavesdropping, they realize that the person in the room is the old woman's first love. They teleport away to find the old woman, but when they say that they found her first love, she is grateful but not interested in meeting him, explaining that they're both old now and they'll be nothing like what they remember each other as. She ends up giving the scarf to Mikage before leaving to go abroad to be with her family. The girls teleport to where the old man is, this time on a bullet train, and track him down in one of the cars. The twins manage to meet up with the old lady once more at the airport. They return the scarf to her, telling her that her first love still remembers her, and he left her his name in the scarf if she wants to stay in touch. She is overjoyed to hear this. Watching her plane take off, Mikage remarks that she loves happy endings.
23	"The Secret Leaked"; Transliteration: "Himitsuga Barechatta" (Japanese: 秘密がバレちゃった)	June 11, 1993
In London, Kurashige is admiring a music box based on Alice in Wonderland when he hears screaming outside. Going out, he sees a child about to fall off a balcony, and climbs up to save him. The child is rescued, but Kurashige falls and injures himself. While in the ambulance, he reminisces in a flashback on how he and Noda got to know the twins. Some years ago, at the school festival, Mikage is playing Alice in a production of Alice in Wonderland. Having trouble with her lines, she is having Tomomi read them to her off-stage, but Daijoji, the director, scolds them and sends Tomomi away. The girls agree to do it through telepathy, and Tomomi goes up to the soundbooth so they won't be suspected. While feeding Mikage her lines, Tomomi is interrupted by Yamagishi, who asks her out on a date and then drags her away against her will. Her protests are accidentally said aloud by Mikage, which is noticed by Kageura, who then begins to suspect that the girls have psychic abilities. Tomomi manages to continue feeding Mikage her lines, ignoring Yamagishi and the date in the process. When she finally gets through the whole play, she takes a break and is greeted by Noda, who offers to get them some noodles. While walking somewhere, Tomomi is discovered by Kageura, who asks her to come up to the roof with him. Kurashige sees this and tells Mikage and Noda about it when they ask about Tomomi. Through telepathy, Mikage finds out where Tomomi is, and tells her not to say anything as Kageura is an ESP fanatic. On the roof, Kageura is interrogating Tomomi when Mikage interrupts. Locking the door, Kageura demands that the twins teleport off the roof if they want to escape, with his video camera at the ready. Noda and Kurashige interrupt by breaking down the door with a battering ram, knocking Kageura unconscious and sending the key flying. In trying to get it, Tomomi is left hanging off of the roof, and Mikage falls with her trying to save her. The girls are forced to teleport back up to the roof, which is witnessed by Kurashige and Noda, revealing to them their powers. The girls apologize for not telling them, but the boys don't mind, and the girls teleport away in order to make it back to the play. At the end of the episode, Kurashige returns to Japan. He gives the music box to Mikage as a gift.
24	"Huh? Senpai's Lover?"; Transliteration: "Eh? Senpai Ni Koibito?" (Japanese: えつ?先輩の恋人？)	June 18, 1993
Mikage runs out of class as soon as the bell rings and teleports home with Tomomi. Unaware of her poor cooking, she makes a meal and brings it to Kurashige in the hospital. Kurashige pretends to enjoy the food for her sake. On her way out, Mikage spots a blonde woman entering Kurashige's room with a bouquet of flowers and wonders about her. When she tells Tomomi about it, Tomomi says that she must be Kurashige's lover, and Mikage throws a pillow at her. When going to visit Kurashige the next day, Mikage sees another young woman, this time a brunette in a tracksuit, leaving his room. Kurashige is already eating sandwiches brought to him, and tells Mikage the flowers were from a friend. While she's there, a third young woman speaking English enters the room, and Mikage runs out. She laments to Tomomi that evening that Kurashige's seeing several girls. The next day, Tomomi goes to visit Kurashige, and he explains that the girls were friends from England who came to see him and ask him to pass on letters and gifts to their boyfriends. Tomomi explains the situation to Mikage, who is relieved at first, but when Mikage sees a vision of Kurashige comforting the blonde woman while she cries, she becomes upset again. At school the next day, Tomomi gives Mikage the pocketwatch and teleports her to Kurashige. Mikage sees Kurashige walking on crutches with the blonde girl, and she runs away before Kurashige can chase her down. Understanding the situation, the blonde girl asks to meet Mikage for coffee. She introduces herself as Liz and explains that she and Kurashige are just friends, and they'd been meeting to talk about her boyfriend, Harry. When Mikage asks why she was crying, Liz explains that she was upset that her boyfriend hadn't been writing lately. Mikage and Tomomi decide to teleport to London to tell Harry to write more to Liz, but they learn that he's been cheating on her. When they teleport back, Kurashige says that he knew about Harry, but didn't know how to tell Liz. The girls decide not to tell Liz, but when they're seeing her off at the airport, she says that she knew about her boyfriend, and is going to write him a goodbye letter.: At one point, Mikage visits a theater by herself. The theater is playing Home Alone, a real-life movie starring Macaulay Culkin as a child accidentally left at home by himself on Christmas vacation.
25	"Mysterious Eastern Rain"; Transliteration: "Fushigi Na Touriame" (Japanese: 不思議な東リ雨)	June 25, 1993
As the girls prepare to visit Kurashige, it starts to rain. Not wanting to get wet, Mikage convinces Tomomi to teleport them away. As they leave, a woman outside their house with an umbrella notices them. At the hospital, Tomomi leaves the room to get something to drink, and bumps into the woman from earlier, knocking away her flower bouquet and scattering petals all around. As she apologizes, the woman tells her not to worry about it, and Tomomi realizes that the flowers have reformed. The woman leaves and makes a cryptic comment about telepathy, leaving Tomomi confused. When the girls are about to leave the hospital, they get ready to teleport, but are interrupted by the woman, who tells them that they should hurry to catch the bus since it's going to rain. Sure enough, it starts raining as she opens her umbrella, but the twins miss the bus. The next day, the girls teleport to the hospital once more, this time landing in some bushes. Just as they think no one's around, the woman appears yet again and asks them to get off the flowers. As soon as she leaves, the girls try to teleport, but a parrot in a cage nearby starts squawking and the woman comes back. She leaves again, but not before telling them that going the normal way doesn't take that much more time. She opens her umbrella as she leaves and it starts raining again. Back home, Mikage decides to call the woman Rain Woman, because it always seems to rain around her. The following day, the girls try to find the woman at the hospital and eventually run into her and are asked to help with the laundry she's doing. When a gust of wind blows one of the sheets off the roof, the girls run down to get it and are about to teleport back up when another sheet falls on them, dropped by the woman from the roof. Frustrated, Mikage swings around the sheets, accidentally knocking the parrot's cage down and setting the bird free. The woman comes down and remarks that it's a shame that the bird escaped, since the kids and elders at the hospital enjoyed its company, but it can't be helped. Feeling guilty, the girls offer to go out and look for the parrot, and the woman makes them promise not to teleport along the way. They eventually find the parrot in the park, but it escapes again. Mikage tries to teleport with Tomomi, but Tomomi reminds her of their promise. At that moment, Rain Woman appears and reminds her, too, telling her that running will make her healthy. Rain Woman opens up her umbrella and it starts to rain again. After some time, the girls find the parrot again, this time on a balcony behind a locked fence. Seeing a cat stalking it, the girls have no choice but to teleport in to save it, scaring away the cat and catching the bird. They are about to fall off the balcony when Rain Woman's umbrella appears, and they grab it and float to safety. Rain Woman approaches them and the parrot flies to her, and she says that they used their power well this time, making the girls realize that they shouldn't be using their powers for trivial things. As the woman speaks, the rain clears up and a rainbow appears, and she makes the parrot disappear and says it's time for her to move on. When the girls ask for her name, she gives it as "Rain Woman," and flies away, suddenly dressed like Mary Poppins.
26	"Me, Transfer Schools?"; Transliteration: "Watashi, Tenkou Shimasu" (Japanese: 私転校します)	July 2, 1993
After a successful volleyball game, Tomomi is approached by a scouter who offers her a spot in a prestigious all-girls school known for its volleyball team. Excited by the prospect, Tomomi runs home to tell Mikage, who is cooking for Kurashige (though it is as poor as ever). Mikage is supportive, but Tomomi hesitates to say if she's going to accept the offer. The next day, Tomomi is congratulated by several students, including her entire homeroom, and she's surprised that everyone found out so soon; unknown to her, the conversation with the scouter was overheard by a classmate. Despite the overwhelming support, Tomomi is still hesitant on whether or not she is going to go. During the next volleyball game, a much bigger crowd than usual is there to watch Tomomi play. After another successful game, the scouter approaches Tomomi again and asks her if she's thought about his offer, but she is still unsure. However, when Noda himself shows his support for her, she decides to accept the offer and runs home to make up an official acceptance. At home, Mikage asks how Tomomi could leave Noda like that, and Tomomi says that she no longer has a relationship with Noda. While cleaning the house, Tomomi finds her old school uniform and flashes back to her junior high days. Back then, she and Mikage attended different schools; Tomomi went to an all-girls school, and Mikage attended a more academic academy along with Kurashige and Noda. Tomomi came home one day to find Mikage crying. Forced to participate in her school's biennial athletics festival despite her lack of physical coordination, Mikage convinces Tomomi to switch places with her, and catches her up to speed on her classmates, teachers, and friends, informing her that a student named Noda is the worst. At school, Tomomi disguised as Mikage witnesses a basketball game, and cheers for one of the players who catches her eye, which turns out to be Noda. That evening, Mikage catches Tomomi studying, and Tomomi explains that she took a liking to Noda and wants to go to the same high school as her and Noda. The flashback ends there. Later, when Tomomi is bringing her letter of acceptance to the scouter, she runs into Noda, and wishes him goodbye, explaining that she thinks she's doing what's best, and that even he supported her. He corrects her, saying that he liked her playing volleyball for their current school. Relieved, she tears up the letter, deciding once and for all not to change schools.
27	"Baseball Miracle"; Transliteration: "Yakyuu De Mirakuru" (Japanese: 野球でミラクル)	July 9, 1993
Wondering where Noda has been going after school lately, Tomomi and Mikage teleport to where he is, and find out that he has started coaching a kids' baseball team. However, the team members are somewhat lazy and unmotivated. Sympathetic, the girls volunteer to help coach the kids, with Tomomi demonstrating techniques and Mikage calculating correct stances and grips. At their first game, the girls show up to cheer on the team, but the boys are still unmotivated, and play very badly. At the bottom of the ninth, the boys manage to load the bases, but the pitcher (for the opposite team) explains that he let them do that on purpose for a challenge. As planned, the next two batters are struck out. When the third batter gets two strikes, the girls hold hands, hoping that the boys can get a hit, and their flowers glow. The batter gets a hit, and though the ball is initially headed for the outfielder's glove, it suddenly veers off course and bounces around the field, just avoiding everyone who tries to get it and giving everyone on the bases enough time to run for home, giving the boys four runs and the game. That evening, the girls realize that they may have used telekinesis to help the boys, but they can't get it to work again. During the next game, the girls try again and use telekinesis, once again helping the boys win the game. Later, Noda, having figured out what's going on, asks them to not use their powers, because he wants the boys to win legitimately. Mikage is reluctant, eager to practice their new power, but eventually agrees. The next game, the boys are losing by a small amount. Mikage wants to help them out, but Tomomi makes her back down, and the boys lose the game. However, they aren't discouraged, and vow to work harder for next time. Noda asks the girls if they used their power this time, and they claim that they couldn't, showing him by trying and failing to make a piece of paper on the ground move. Satisfied, all three of them leave to get ice cream, and the baseball equipment behind them falls to the ground.
28	"A Woman's Battle! I Win!"; Transliteration: "Onna No Tatakai! Watashi No Kachi Yo" (Japanese: 女の戦い!私の勝ちよ)	July 16, 1993
Daijoji is once again frustrated by her inability to surpass Mikage in school, and vows to beat her. During their next test, however, Mikage finishes first as usual. Finishing second, Daijoji approaches her and declares that she's going to win. In their next test, Daijoji finishes before Mikage, but has to sit back down when Kageura points out that she forgot to write her name at the top. After school, Mikage and Tomomi go shopping for a present for Kurashige, who is being discharged soon. Daijoji stalks them, hoping to spy on Mikage's studying technique, but loses track of the girls when they disappear down a dead-end alleyway. The next day, Mikage beats Daijoji once again, Daijoji having studied for the wrong test, and goes out shopping again with Tomomi, stalked once more by Daijoji. However, Daijoji loses them again when they disappear behind a truck and don't come out the other side. After their next test, Daijoji starts yelling at Mikage when Kageura compliments her on a perfect score, but Mikage is distracted by Tomomi's telepathy and excuses herself. The next day, Daijoji is frustrated to find that Mikage has gotten the top score again, and becomes more frustrated when Noda mentions that Mikage doesn't study. After school, Daijoji follows Mikage to the hospital and discovers that she's visiting Kurashige. She vows to steal Kurashige's heart, and removes her glasses and undoes her braids, believing that she's become more beautiful by doing so. When she visits Kurashige, he is unimpressed, however, and is polite but cool towards her. Nevertheless, the next day, Daijoji shows Mikage a picture she took of herself with an uncomfortable Kurashige, which upsets Mikage just as planned. When Kurashige is scheduled to be released from the hospital, Daijoji takes over, ignoring the fact that Mikage, Tomomi, and Noda had come to pick him up, saying that one of her father's limos was outside for him. She succeeds in getting Kurashige away, but he firmly tells her that he is in love with Mikage and is uninterested in her, causing her to bring him back to the hospital, where he greets an overjoyed Mikage. The following day, Daijoji discovers that she finally beat Mikage in one of the tests, and gloats.
29	"Do You Like Ghosts?"; Transliteration: "Yuurei Ha Osuki?" (Japanese: 幽霊はお好き？)	July 23, 1993
Mikage and Tomomi teleport to meet Kurashige and Noda, so that all four of them can go to a barbecue to celebrate Kurashige's recovery before he heads back to England. They make it to the mansion where the party is being held, where Yamagishi greets them, his aunt having recently purchased the old house. Yamagishi informs them that there may be a ghost in the mansion, of the baron who used to own the place. He tells them the story of the baron, an English man whose bride never came to their wedding because her parents forbade the marriage, and subsequently committed suicide in the mansion. As Yamagishi finishes the story, Mikage and Kurashige hear an eerie laugh, and Mikage hears a voice say "I loved her." While Mikage and Kurashige prepare for the party in the garden outside, Yamagishi, Noda, and Tomomi leave to grab cutlery and desserts. As Mikage and Kurashige continue to build a fire pit outside, the glass pitcher behind them shatters, and the two of them run inside to find the others. Mikage hurries upstairs, but the doors in the hallway start opening and closing on their own, and she hears the others crying out for help. Kurashige joins her and they go down the hallway, back to the room where the baron committed suicide, which contains the wedding dress for his bride. The baron appears behind them and they run into the room, but it's revealed that it's only Noda in a costume, and Yamagishi and Tomomi appear, having played a prank on them. However, the three of them see the ghost of the real baron coming up the stairs, but he vanishes when he sees Noda and Tomomi holding hands. The three run into the room where Mikage and Kurashige is, and when Mikage sees Noda wearing the old-fashioned outfit, and then notices herself in the mirror covered in dirt from the escapade, she runs out of the room, upset about the prank and that Kurashige didn't tell her she got dirty. While washing her face, the real ghost appears in front of her, and tells her he loves her. She tells him she loves someone else, but he insists on her becoming his bride. She tries to run away, but hits her head and falls unconscious. She wakes up in a bed and finds that the ghost is there, and that his hand melted when he placed it on her head to cool her down. He offers her a rose as proof of his love. Enchanted, she is about to take it when Kurashige's voice outside interrupts them, and she tells the ghost that she loves Kurashige. However, when she tries to leave, the door is locked. The ghost chases her onto the balcony, and Kurashige is unable to break the window between them. Trying to run away, Mikage falls off the balcony, but is saved just in time by Kurashige, which banishes the ghost from the mansion.
30	"Miracle by Two"; Transliteration: "Kisekiha Futaride" (Japanese: 奇跡は二人で)	July 30, 1993
It's the first day of summer vacation, and the girls wake up early to go to club activities, while Kageura fantasizes about exposing the girls' secret and becoming rich and famous. The girls find the door to the school locked, so they teleport inside, but as they look out the window, Kageura and their boyfriends catch them. The boys distract Kageura so the girls can unlock the doors without being caught. Kageura starts accusing Mikage in the middle of an experiment as she talks with Kurashige about summer plans, but as her beaker starts glowing, she and Kurashige walk away, letting it explode in front of him. Tomomi and Noda, meanwhile, are taking a break from running to eat lunch, but Tomomi and Mikage simultaneously realize they forgot to bring food. They meet outside, unknowingly watched by Kageura, and teleport home and back again. Having finally witnessed their powers, Kageura cackles to himself and once again vows to expose their secret. When Kageura returns home to tell his wife Rika the good news, he finds instead a letter from her, telling him that she loves him, but she needs time to think about her future, because she's not sure if she can stay married to a man who lives in fantasy. Meanwhile, the twins' mother brings them a gift that evening: identical rings cut from the same stone, said to bring happiness. Later that evening, Kageura calls the Matsunaga residence, and tells Mikage that he found a watch seemingly belonging to Kurashige, who he can't contact. Mikage runs to the school right away and heads up to the science lab, but Kageura locks her inside, preparing a video camera at the keyhole to film the inevitable teleportation. When he hears nothing, he runs outside to see if she teleported out there, and Tomomi, having been contacted telepathically, meets Mikage at the door. She runs to find help when she can't open the door, and, hearing Kageura's voice, Mikage shouts at him and kicks the door. This causes papers to fall and catch fire from the oil lamp she lit, setting fire to the room. Kurashige, Noda, and Tomomi hurry inside to help her, and Mikage manages to get into the crawlspace above the room through a trapdoor, falling through the ceiling into a different room. While calling for her, the girls' rings light up, allowing Tomomi and the others to find Mikage, and the girls manage to teleport outside, just behind Kageura. Kageura finally gives up and is about to run inside when the girls call out to him. He is relieved at first, but then accuses them of teleporting, telling them he witnessed them at lunchtime. At that moment, Kurashige and Noda run outside, and the principal of the school comes up and drags Kageura away to reprimand him for being irresponsible in taking care of the old building. As he is dragged away, Kageura swears to get proof of the girls' psychic powers.
31	"The Night of the Star Coral"; Transliteration: "Hoshi Sango No Yoru" (Japanese: 星サンゴの夜)	August 6, 1993
The girls are walking to the beach to join Kurashige and Noda at Kurashige's summer house. As they take a break, a limo passes by them, and we see that the occupants are a wealthy young man named Masaki, his little sister Nana, and their butler and chauffeur, who are going to their own summer house, a mansion on the cliff. The girls decide to teleport to the beach, and shortly after, Kageura appears, having decided to come along as a chaperone. Inside the house, Tomomi admires some star coral displayed in a jar and wonders if she could get some for herself, but Noda and Kurashige explain that the star coral in the area is long gone. The four go to the beach, where Kurashige relaxes on the sand, Noda and Tomomi go swimming, and Mikage floats in a life preserver. Kageura sneaks out and puts together some electronics, creating a mechanical shark with the intention of scaring the girls into teleporting away. The shark frightens them, but Tomomi notices its antenna and shoves Mikage's life preserver over the shark's head, breaking it. The malfunctioning shark swims towards Kageura and causes an explosion, allowing the girls to teleport undetected to the beach. However, they are witnessed by Masaki, watching them from his mansion. The next day, Noda is pondering how he can get his hands on some star coral for Tomomi, and Kageura comes up and casually mentions that a cave nearby may have some. Noda takes the bait and goes to the cave, where he descends down a rope ladder. However, someone pulls up the rope ladder behind him, leaving him stranded. That evening, a storm is brewing at dinnertime, and the girls and Kurashige are worried about Noda. Kageura remarks that the storm is dangerous, and Noda could be in trouble. They set out to look for him as lightning strikes become more frequent. When they are unsuccessful, Kageura tries to goad the girls into teleporting, insisting that Noda could be in serious trouble if they don't find him right away. The girls are about to give in and do it, but just then Noda runs up, having found out that the back of the cave went out to the sea. As they talk, lightning strikes the tree just behind Kageura, causing it to fall. Kageura is crushed underneath, and Noda shoves Tomomi out of the way, getting hit himself in the process. The girls and Kurashige are trying to figure out how to get them to a hospital when the butler from earlier drives up, having left to get groceries. He brings everyone to the mansion and manages to fix up Noda and Kageura. Noda shows Tomomi the star coral he finally managed to get in the cave, but she's more relieved that he's alive.
32	"Miracle Summer"; Transliteration: "Mirakuru Sama" (Japanese: ミラクルサマ)	August 13, 1993
At breakfast, Kageura is forcing the girls to eat nothing but fruits and vegetables, insisting that as espers they need to watch what they eat. Noda and Kurashige destroy Kageura's videotapes to get him to go into town to buy more, but he makes them come with him, leaving the girls alone at the house. As they walk on the beach, Masaki approaches them with Nana and all four introduce themselves. Nana insults the girls, much to their chagrin, and Masaki invites them to join him and the others for lunch at the mansion. During lunch, Mikage complains about Kageura trying to expose their secret, and Masaki asks what secret they mean, with Tomomi badly trying to cover for Mikage's mistake. After lunch, Masaki shows them around the garden outside, and when they're distracted by flowers, he, possessing psychic abilities of his own, uses telekinesis to levitate a large bronze statue behind them, hoping to force them to teleport. However, he is made to stop when Nana runs up, and he declines her offer for a picnic. He explains to the girls as Nana runs off that their parents died years ago. Feeling awkward, the girls decide to leave. As they go, they spot Nana climbing a precipice to get her hat from the tree at the edge, and they call out to her to get down. She doesn't hear them and continues climbing, and though she gets her hat, she falls into the ocean. Tomomi dives in and swims to her, rescuing her, and Mikage is forced to use a nearby rowboat to save them. However, Mikage falls overboard and starts drowning, with Tomomi unable to reach her. Masaki arrives at the beach, sees the situation, and uses his telekinesis to part the waves, allowing the girls to touch hands and teleport safely to the beach with Nana. Masaki thanks them for saving her and walks off as they wonder what happened, and if he saw them teleport. Meanwhile, Kageura offers to treat Noda and Kurashige to lunch, but suddenly changes his mind when they refuse to help him sell out the girls and forces them to pay for everything. When they try to catch a bus, Kageura's backpack flies out the window, forcing him to get off the bus and chase after the truck it fell onto. Kageura eventually gets his things back, but ends up stranded when he misses the last bus of the day.
33	"Lost Love on Good Terms?!"; Transliteration: "Nakahoku Rosato Rabu?!" (Japanese: 仲良くロストラブ？！)	August 20, 1993
Mikage has a bad dream that Kurashige is planning to stay in England for good the next time he goes back. Kurashige calls her that day to go on a date, but Tomomi dampens Mikage's spirits by reminding her that he's going back to London soon. Nervous, Mikage gets Tomomi to come with her for emotional support, and they teleport to the park. When Mikage meets Kurashige, with Tomomi hiding in the bushes, she can't bring herself to say anything and runs off, making Tomomi switch places with her. Kurashige is confused when "Mikage" returns, but brings himself together and asks her if she'd like to go to the aquarium. Mikage encourages Tomomi through telepathy and Tomomi accepts. As Mikage follows Tomomi and Kurashige, she's interrupted by Noda, who thinks she's Tomomi and reminds her about their date at the amusement park. Tomomi tells Mikage to go with it and Mikage is forced to go with Noda to the amusement park, though they just sit on a bench the whole time. Eventually, the girls agree to bring their dates to meet at a cafe. However, things are a little awkward, and the pairs end up splitting up again. After a moment of indecision, the girls decide to continue the charade, with Tomomi in disguise going with Kurashige, and Mikage in disguise going with Noda. Kurashige and Tomomi go to the amusement park as well and visit a fortune teller. The fortune teller reads their palms and tells them that they're not a good match. Meanwhile, Mikage panics on a roller coaster ride with Noda, wondering how Tomomi could like those kinds of things. Around the same time, Kurashige tells Tomomi that he loves someone else, and Noda tells Mikage the same thing. The girls meet up, upset, and the boys reveal that they figured out the deception and were teasing them. At home, Mikage is sad that she didn't get to talk to Kurashige, but she's happy that he gave her a CD of music she'd been wanting.: At the end of the episode, Mikage and Tomomi listen to one of the songs on the CD. The song is Chopin's Op. 18 No. 1 Grand Valse Brilliante.
34	"Revolving Thoughts"; Transliteration: "Meguru Omoi" (Japanese: 巡る思い)	August 27, 1993
Mikage stays up late knitting a sweater as a going-away gift for Kurashige. As a result, she is unable to come help Kurashige pack, leaving just Tomomi and Noda to do it. While there, Kurashige comments that he's worried that Mikage might think that he thinks she doesn't care about him, with her rarely being able to express her true feelings, but he knows what she wants to say, and he knows she cares about him as much as he does her. The next morning, after staying up two nights, Mikage manages to finish the sweater and makes a phone call, intending to meet Kurashige before he goes to the airport. On the train, she bumps into Kageura's wife, Rika, who has gone clothes shopping for him out of worry. When Rika leaves the train, Mikage realizes that when they set their packages down, they picked up the wrong ones, and Rika now has her sweater while she has Kageura's clothes. Mikage calls for Tomomi and the two of them head to Kageura's apartment to meet up with Rika, unknowingly just missing her as she also realized she had the wrong package. Kageura comes home to find them at his door, and they ask him where Rika is. Not wanting to admit she left him, he runs away, pursued by the twins. Finally, they wear him down pounding on his door, and he gives up and asks what they want. Mikage gives him the package and explains that she met Rika at a train station, and Kageura runs off to find her, ecstatic. By the time this happens, it's well past Mikage's meeting time with Kurashige, but she and Tomomi teleport there anyway just in case; luckily, they find Kurashige still there, and Mikage goes out to meet him. She apologizes, but then notices that he's wearing the sweater; Rika had managed to find him earlier and passed on the gift. The next day, Noda and the girls are seeing off Kurashige at the airport, and as he leaves down an escalator, Mikage finally gathers her courage and tells him she loves him.
35	"Mysterious Transfer Student"; Transliteration: "Nazo No Tenkousei" (Japanese: 謎の転校生)	September 3, 1993
Kurashige is back in England, remembering a letter Mikage wrote to him. As he walks down a country road, a young woman on an out-of-control motorcycle crashes into him and they both fall down. He fixes her motorcycle, but she pretends to be injured, forcing him to take her into town. When a limo passes by them, it suddenly stops and backs up; its occupants and the young woman recognize each other, but she quickly reaches around Kurashige to start up the motorcycle and get away. Kurashige takes them off the path, down a hillside, and through some underbrush, stopping just in time at the edge of a cliff. The car pursuing them crashes in an attempt to stop, allowing them to escape. However, they are stopped again farther down the road and are surrounded by men in suits, who tell the young woman that she shouldn't be gallavanting about when she has a party to attend. The young woman gives up and asks Kurashige for his name. He introduces himself, and she takes off her hat, revealing her long red hair, and introduces herself as Marie, the same woman from the castle in earlier episodes. Back in Japan, a new transfer student shows up in Mikage's homeroom: It's Masaki, the wealthy young man from the beach. As he walks to his desk, he tells Mikage he's happy to see a friendly face, making the other girls in the class jealous. After class, Noda runs into him and greets him in a friendly manner, but Masaki is cold to him, telling him to stay out of his way. Later, Masaki shows that he's not only academic, but athletic, nearly topping Kurashige's height record in the high jump. After gym, Masaki helps Mikage clean up, and mentions that Nana's doing well and she wants to see the twins again. On their way home, the girls and Noda discuss Maaski; though Mikage is impressed by him, Noda remains indifferent. In England, Kurashige is on his way to mail a letter to Mikage, but is abruptly kidnapped by men in suits driving a limousine. They explain that they're taking him to the island of Diamas, a small, relatively unknown independent country in the British isles, by order of the princess. Once at the castle, he learns that the princess is none other than Marie, the young woman from earlier. She apologizes for her methods, but when he tries to leave, she begs him to stay for just a week, since she's very lonely there. He reluctantly agrees so long as she mails his letter for him. That evening, Kurashige is stuck in his room, staring wistfully at the lake outside, while Marie burns his letter, declaring that he belongs to her. At home, Mikage is approached by Masaki, who, upon learning that Kurashige hasn't written yet, tries to tell her that he's forgotten about her and that he (Masaki) loves her. He advances on her, and as she calls Tomomi telepathically for help, she slaps him, ruining his advances. Tomomi runs up and is relieved to see her okay; however, Masaki comments that he knew she would come, and he leaves with this cryptic comment.
36	"A Dangerous Guy"; Transliteration: "Kiken Na Aitsu" (Japanese: 危険なあいつ)	September 10, 1993
Mikage wakes up from a nightmare of Masaki trying to kiss her. She wakes up, relieved that it was only a dream, and replaces Kurashige's picture from where it had fallen in the night. At school, Masaki reads aloud a romantic passage and meets Mikage's eyes, making her uncomfortable. Later, Mikage is sitting in a classroom by herself while Kageura spies on her from a tree outside with his video camera, hoping that she'll teleport. Masaki happens upon him and uses telekinesis to break the branch he's sitting on, making him crash to the ground. He goes up to the classroom where Mikage is, startling her into dropping the test tube she's holding. As she picks up the glass shards, he apologizes for his behavior last night. Distracted, she cuts her finger on a shard, and to her shock he sticks her finger in his mouth. He then wraps her finger with a piece of cloth, and as he stands there holding her hand, Tomomi comes in, having sensed something. Misaki abruptly leaves, and as he walks away, we see that he stole Mikage's ring. The next day, Kageura is eating lunch in his office when someone knocks on the door and leaves an envelope outside containing Mikage's ring and a letter explaining that the sender is also interested in ESP and would like to help him. The girls receive a letter asking them to come to the amusement park. As they go into the park, the gate closes behind them, revealing that the park is closed. The man at the ferris wheel offers them a ride, and they accept. However, it is actually Kageura in disguise at the controls, and he stops the wheel at the top, hoping to force them to teleport down so he can tape it. The girls recognize him filming from a distance, and Tomomi manages to climb out of the gondola and climb down the Ferris wheel to confront Kageura. As he makes excuses, Masaki shows up behind him and knocks him out with a karate chop. Masaki gives the ring back to Tomomi, and up in the air, Mikage falls out of the car, barely catching herself on a spoke. Tomomi climbs up to help her, but they can't quite reach each other, and Mikage ends up falling. However, Masaki catches her with telekinesis, helping her float safely to the ground. As Tomomi climbs back down and meets them, he tells them that he's an esper, just like they are. Meanwhile, in Diamas, Kurashige is writing a letter to Mikage in his room when Marie interrupts him, dressed in a riding outfit, and asks if he'd like to go out horseback riding. He tells her he's in the middle of writing a letter, and as he seals the envelope, she grabs it from him and runs out, locking him inside. As she tells him she'll take care of the letter, she rips it up. She and Kurashige go out on horses, and head into the woods, where Marie falls off her horse, injuring her ankle. Kurashige carries her to a nearby stream where she can soak her ankle to bring down the swelling. She starts to come on to him all of a sudden, but they're interrupted by her bodyguards, having come to bring her back to the palace.
37	"A False Young Noble"; Transliteration: "Itsuwari No Kikoushi" (Japanese: 偽りの貴公子)	September 17, 1993
At a cafe, Tomomi tells Noda about Masaki's telekinesis. When she goes home, she finds Mikage in a surprisingly good mood, and Mikage explains that she's decided that since there's nothing she can do about it if Kurashige won't write her, she won't waste time worrying. At that moment, the mail arrives, with an envelope addressed from Kurashige. Unfortunately, it's not a letter, but a photo of Kurashige with Marie. This sends Mikage into another depression. In a brief look at Diamas, we see that Marie lied to Kurashige about sending his letter to Mikage, and really sent her own message in its place, hoping to upset his and Mikage's relationship. The next day, Mikage and Tomomi are invited by Masaki to hang out with him at his place after school. At school, while Masaki and the girls are chatting near the field, a soccer ball comes flying at them, but Masaki stops it with his powers. This is seen by Noda, who later approaches Masaki and berates him for showing off his abilities. In response, Masaki informs him that he and other espers are inherently better than normal humans, and there's nothing wrong with showing off. This angers Noda, but he is unable to attack Masaki due to Masaki's telekinesis. When Tomomi and Mikage are preparing to leave with Masaki, Noda tries to stop them, but a slip of the tongue upsets Mikage and, by proxy, Tomomi. That evening, the girls are being taught chess by Masaki when Noda shows up at the front door, asking to see Tomomi; he is led to a room and asked to wait. While Masaki shows off his powers by levitating the girls in the garden among hundreds of lights, Noda wanders into another room and discovers that Masaki has a file full of data on other espers, including the twins. Masaki finds him and explains that his ultimate plan is to unite all espers of the world and rule over ordinary humans. In order to stop Noda from talking, Masaki reveals that he has another psychic ability: hypnosis. He uses this power to wipe Noda's memory of the event and force him to never act against him again. At school the next day, Noda runs into Tomomi, and he thinks that there was something he wanted to say to her when he's suddenly struck by a splitting headache. When Masaki approaches the two of them to ask what's wrong, Noda is unable to answer, and stumbles away.
38	"I Will Protect You!"; Transliteration: "Kimi Wo Mamoru!" (Japanese: 君を守る!)	September 24, 1993
During school, Noda is still having trouble with Masaki, stumbling every time he sees him due to aftereffects of the hypnosis. The girls are oblivious to this and continue hanging out with Masaki, planning to dine with him that night since Nana and the butler will be out. On their way to the house, Nana jumps out at them, wanting to surprise Masaki before they left. When she and the butler leave, Masaki says that she's just an ordinary human, and the girls realize from his mood that he really does love his sister. After dinner, Masaki invites the girls to the basement, where he shows them the file he has and asks them to join his movement. They refuse, so he traps them there by using telekinesis to plant spears around them like cages, preventing them from running or being able to touch hands. He attempts to hypnotize Tomomi first, but just as he begins, Noda runs in, having broken free of the hypnosis and sensing Tomomi's cry for help. Noda advances on Masaki despite the barrage of objects telekinetically thrown at him, making Masaki wonder how an ordinary human can stand up to someone superior. The girls manage to knock down one of the spears and touch hands, teleporting over to Noda. Just as they do, Masaki throws a dagger, which strikes Mikage. Luckily, she was carrying Kurashige's pocket watch in her breast pocket, so she was unharmed, though the watch was damaged. Masaki starts losing control of his power, a whirlwind of telekinetic energy surrounding him as he stands there. Not wanting to just abandon him, Mikage approaches him despite the danger and holds his hands, calling out to him. She gets through to him and he collapses. Just as the ceiling is about to cave in, the girls teleport away with Noda and Masaki. Masaki wakes up later to find Nana crying over him, and comforts her. Outside, Noda and Tomomi are talking about how Mikage's miraculous save was Kurashige protecting her, and Noda promises to protect Tomomi no matter what. The episode ends with Masaki suddenly moving away, leaving a parting gift of blooming flowers in his old garden for the girls to witness. In Diamas, Kurashige has finally realized that Marie is stopping his letters after finding a scrap of one in the courtyard. Despite her having him held at gunpoint, he demands that he be allowed to return home, and she finally relents, though she silently promises to get him back one day. Kurashige ends up hitching a ride back to London on a hay wagon, writing yet another letter to Mikage.
39	"The Twins Dissolved?!"; Transliteration: "Futago Kaishou?!" (Japanese: 双子解消？！)	October 1, 1993
While preparing to meet their Aunt Noe at the airport, the girls get into an argument when it's discovered that Mikage borrowed Tomomi's special Captain Panda shirt and soiled it while gardening. Mikage learns that it was a couples outfit to wear with Noda, and says that she wouldn't have worn it if she'd known, since she wouldn't want to wear the same thing as Noda. She and Tomomi start bickering when their mother calls to remind them to go out right away or they'll be late. They decide to teleport to the airport, but thanks to their argument, they're unable to sync up. Later, their Aunt Noe, their mother's twin sister, has arrived, and lightly complains about having to spend an hour at the airport. Tomomi and Mikage blame each other for this. While resting from her shower, Noe discovers a photo album of her and her sister when they were little, and shows it off. Mikage comments that the two of them look just like her and Tomomi, and she and Tomomi go get their own album. As the four of them look at the albums, they realize how similar they are, down to one of the twins (Mikage and Noe, respectively) hitting her sister as babies, and the other twin (Tomomi and her mother, respectively) sharing half of whatever she owns with her sister. They order sushi for dinner, but Mikage gets upset when Tomomi eats the last tamago she was hoping to have, and they start fighting again. After her shower, Tomomi enters their room to discover that Mikage is dividing it with a curtain so they won't have to look at each other, and they start another argument about the size of the division. Their mother and aunt come in, and their mother tries to pacify them, but Mikage gets more upset and threatens to run away. Noe offers to let Mikage come back to London with her, and Mikage agrees immediately, shocking Tomomi and their mother. The next evening, Mikage and Noe are out at a fancy restaurant, discussing the trip to London. Mikage is looking forward to it because she'll be able to meet up with Kurashige. At home, Tomomi and her mother are wondering if Mikage will accept, and her mother mentions that she and Noe have discussed Mikage studying abroad before. She says that in the end, it's Mikage's decision. The next day, Tomomi tells Noda about the situation; he is supportive of the idea, and points out that they'd be able to communicate telepathically if they wanted, but Tomomi is worried because they weren't able to teleport earlier. Tomomi comes home to find that Mikage has already packed for her trip, and left her side of the room cleaned out. Tomomi is initially upset when she realizes that Mikage is leaving the hair dryer they bought together behind, but when Mikage coldly says that she'll buy a new one and it'll be a relief to not share things, Tomomi snaps at her and walks away. Tomomi refuses to come and see off Mikage, insisting that Mikage won't care if she comes. At the airport, Mikage and Noe are chatting over lunch about Kurashige. Noe mentions that before they were married, her husband worked in Belgium for a time, and she couldn't stand being alone so she followed him. Mikage's mother shows up to see her off and reminds her to call when she lands. Noda unexpectedly shows up with a farewell gift, a necklace that he reveals was chosen by Tomomi. At the gate, Mikage realizes she can't bear to be so far away from Tomomi, and has a sudden change of heart about leaving. Noe reveals that she always wanted to raise one of the twins as her own, but their mother refused to separate them. At home, Tomomi is crying over the photo album when Mikage calls to her with telepathy and tells her she's coming back. On the plane, Noe hears a voice in her head and realizes that it's her sister. She's relieved that the two of them can still use telepathy after so many years, and they have both noticed that Mikage and Tomomi have the power too. At the end of the episode, Tomomi and Mikage are able to successfully teleport.
40	"Run, Yamagishi!"; Transliteration: "Yamagishi Hashiru" (Japanese: 山岸走る！)	October 8, 1993
The athletics festival is coming up, and Yamagishi, the class coach, pushes everyone harder than ever, making them train every day after school. While passing by the women's locker room, Noda accidentally sees Tomomi in her underwear, and runs away, flustered. He is unable to concentrate on training and tries to avoid even looking at Tomomi, which upsets her. On her way home, she asks to walk home with Yamagishi, hoping to ask him something. At a cafe, she asks him why Noda was acting so strangely, and confesses that she thinks he must hate her because of how he was behaving. Yamagishi is sure Noda doesn't hate her, but he doesn't know the real reason, so he promises to talk to him about it. The next day, Yamagishi and Noda skip practice to talk. Yamagishi confirms that Noda still likes Tomomi, and manages to get him to confess to the reason he's avoiding her. However, Noda makes him promise that he won't tell Tomomi. That evening, Yamagishi tells Tomomi that Noda does still like her, but he can't tell her the reason he's avoiding her. Tomomi thinks that it's because he hates her after all, and that Yamagishi is trying to spare her feelings. Out of the blue, Yamagishi confesses his feelings for her, and asks her to go out with him if he wins the 100-meter dash against Noda in the festival. As a result, Yamagishi starts training harder than ever. While Noda is washing his face, Mikage approaches him and informs him of Yamagishi's intentions with Tomomi and that Tomomi is still worried he hates her, so Noda should ask her what her feelings are if he cares about her. After school, Tomomi runs into Noda in the hallway, but he can barely bring himself to look at her and she runs away, crying silently around the corner. When he has a series of nightmares involving Tomomi going out with Yamagishi, Noda steels his resolve. At the festival, he and Yamagishi race, and it's a perfect tie. When Tomomi runs to Noda to check on him after he falls down going over the finish line, Noda apologizes for avoiding her, and Yamagishi reveals that trying to go out with Tomomi was a ploy to get them to make up and get back together. Later, the school is celebrating around a bonfire, and Yamagishi manages to get Noda to admit he saw Tomomi changing while Tomomi is in earshot. When she hears this, she becomes upset, and Noda chases after her, apologizing while Yamagishi cries.
41	"Distant Promise"; Transliteration: "Tooi Yakusoku" (Japanese: 遠い約束)	October 15, 1993
An archaeological dig in Egypt uncovers a relief of two women locking pinkies, much in the same way the twins do when they teleport. In Japan, Tomomi comes upstairs to fetch Mikage for tea and dessert, and finds her researching ancient hieroglyphs. Mikage explains that she's doing it to help Kurashige's volunteer job at a museum in England, and she asks Tomomi to teleport with her to London so she can deliver them right away. As they teleport, the full moon eclipses, and they somehow wind up in ancient Egypt, right on top of someone who was about to attack the Pharaoh. The Pharaoh, who resembles Kurashige, thanks them for their help. Tomomi and Mikage are invited to the palace and given period-appropriate clothing. They realize that they've ended up in ancient times, and end up telling the Pharaoh that they teleported in. A woman who resembles Daijoji, whose name is Rumiopatra, and her servant, a young man named Iyoeh who resembles Noda, enter. She asks Iyoeh to bring the Pharaoh the wine she brought, but he trips and spills it; Tomomi checks on him, but Rumiopatra slaps him in anger. The girls scold her for this and she leaves in anger. Just then, a servant runs in and announces that the pyramid they're building crumbled again. At the site, the Pharaoh orders the pyramid be rebuilt again after the injured are tended to. Mikage comments that there must be a mistake in the construction, since the pyramids have stood for thousands of years. Using her notes, Mikage draws up a blueprint for the builders, and Tomomi cooks stew for those on break. That night, Mikage goes over the blueprints again with the Pharaoh, and he suddenly holds her hand and remarks how mysterious and wonderful she is, appearing out of nowhere and solving his problems. As Tomomi approaches with dessert, an assassin appears and throws a knife, intending to kill Mikage, but the Pharaoh shields her and is stabbed in his shoulder. He makes a quick recovery, however, and the girls teleport outside to chase the assassin, who Iyoeh has just found out was ordered by Rumiopatra to kill the girls. Iyoeh tries to take the blame, and though the girls know he's covering for Rumiopatra, Shadaorah finds them and has Iyoeh dragged away for execution while declaring that one of the girls will marry the Pharaoh. Iyoeh is about to be burned on a cross, but just then a lunar eclipse starts, and the girls use this to their advantage to claim that they are making the moon disappear as punishment for executing Iyoeh. Before the moon can completely disappear, the Pharaoh appears and pardons Iyoeh. Iyoeh, now untied, promises to one day throw his life away for Tomomi's sake, which shocks her. The girls must leave, and the Pharaoh promises Mikage that they'll meet in a distant future. They teleport back to their room to find that very little time has passed. At the end of the episode, Mikage reads a letter from Kurashige thanking her for her documents. He says that the characters on the mural of the women touching pinkies have been translated, and they read as such: "In the distant future, I want to believe we have a promise to meet."
42	"Tomomi Goes Ballistic!"; Transliteration: "Tomomi Ikaru!" (Japanese: ともみ怒る！)	October 22, 1993
Tomomi and Mikage are running late to go to school to help with festival preparations. Mikage wanders around the house half-asleep while Tomomi runs around doing laundry, getting dressed, and making breakfast. As she drags Mikage behind her onto the train, she suddenly runs off and sprints home, leaving Mikage behind, so that she can hang the laundry. After hanging the laundry, Tomomi runs into all sorts of trouble where she gets held up; she is asked to bring the register book to her mother's salon, look for a lost kitten, catch a taxi due to a train accident and then run out of a traffic jam, catch a shoplifter, and purchase religious scripture. She finally makes it to school and apologizes to Mikage, Noda, Yamagishi, and Daijoji for making them wait, but she learns that they haven't even started anything, having been waiting for her to come up with an idea. She suggests a cafe-style setup, and the others agree. Daijoji produces apron patterns and sewing kits for everyone, but Noda asks Tomomi to make his as well, to which she agrees. Mikage learns what happened and accuses Tomomi of being a doormat. Before she can go scold Noda, Tomomi stops her, insisting that she doesn't mind. Mikage decides that since Tomomi's fine with it, Tomomi can make Mikage's apron as well. Tomomi ends up having to do the baking for the menu, but as she works while Mikage draws up designs, they get a phone call from Yamagishi, who wants help deciding on a tablecloth, which leads to more trouble for Tomomi. Once Tomomi gets home, her mother scolds her for not taking in the laundry, and then reminds her to go over and borrow the coffee cups right away since the owner can't meet her tomorrow. After some more trouble, she manages to bring the cups to school. On her way there, Tomomi is stopped by Kageura, but she runs away when he asks her to sew up his torn shirt. At school, Tomomi finds Mikage and Daijoji bickering, and Noda asks her where his apron is. Finally at her limit, Tomomi yells at him, and several objects fly around the room and break. She declares that she's sick of everyone being selfish, and takes charge, ordering Mikage to write the menu and put up decorations, Daijoji to help with the baking, and Noda and Yamagishi to finish the remaining aprons. While working, everyone realizes that they foisted most of the work onto Tomomi and feel guilty about it. Their cafe ends up being a huge hit, and Tomomi says that it felt good to let out her anger.
43	"Movies are a Festival, a Life!"; Transliteration: "Eiga Ha Matsuri Da Jinsei Da!" (Japanese: 映画はまつりは人生だ！)	October 29, 1993
The twins, Noda, and Yamagishi are trying to decide what to do for winter vacation, but they have no money to go on a trip. Reading a magazine, Yamagishi discovers an independent film contest with a cash prize, and rounds up several students to discuss what to film. Several ideas are thrown around, but Kageura, who is sponsoring the film, comes up with the idea of psychic twins, and gets Tomomi and Mikage to play the lead roles. He is hoping to get their powers on camera, but he is suddenly called away to attend his sister's wedding, and is unable to be there for the filming. Yamagishi decides that the story will mainly be about a villain named Urakage against the hero Kurashige Mask (played by Noda). On her way home that day, Daijoji is roped into getting a makeover at a beauty parlor, where the stylist removes her glasses and lets down her hair. She dislikes the look and leaves, but she almost gets hit by a motorcycle on the street. Yamagishi, passing by, saves her, and is struck by her beauty, not recognizing her without her glasses and hair up. Daijoji fails to recognize him as well without her glasses. They go to a park, where she treats a scrape he got from saving her with her own handkerchief. Thanks to this encounter, Yamagishi decides to add some romance into the movie, where the hero and one of the twins get together at the end. After school, Yamagishi goes out and buys a rose bouquet, which he present to Daijoji when they meet again at the park. He tells her he's making a movie at the moment, and he promises that for her sake it will be great. He starts pushing the class harder than ever, confusing everyone (including Daijoji) with his strengthened passion. They finally finish the movie and Daijoji and Yamagishi run off to meet each other. Daijoji leaves her hair in braids this time, and just as she and Yamagishi are about to confess to each other, she puts on her glasses and they recognize each other. Feeling awkward, they both run away. Later, their film wins the competition, and Kageura (who has just returned) is disappointed that there was no teleportation.
44	"Dad's Girlfriend?"; Transliteration: "Papa No Koibito?" (Japanese: パパの恋人？)	November 5, 1993
The twins' mother is away with her friends for the night, leaving the girls at home alone. Hearing a strange sound, they go downstairs and discover an intruder in a Frankenstein mask approaching. They attack with tennis rackets and start throwing various objects, knocking the intruder to the ground. He takes off his mask to reveal that he's their father, and he was trying to surprise them. The girls, annoyed, go to bed, leaving him on the floor. The next morning, they go downstairs to find that he's made breakfast, and that he also did their laundry. Upset that he washed their underwear with his own, they gather their things and storm off. On a date with Noda, Tomomi passes by a cafe and spots her father with a young woman, to whom he gives a beautiful diamond necklace. When Noda makes a joke about it, she slaps him and runs away. That evening, Tomomi tells Mikage about it, but Mikage doesn't seem to care. Their mother finally comes home, but they can't bring themselves to tell her about the situation. The girls stay up late waiting for their dad, and interrogate him when he comes home. He tells them he came back home due to a request he couldn't turn down, and that he had to talk to their mother about something important. During lunch the next day, Mikage wonders who they would live with if their parents did get divorced, but this upsets Tomomi further and she leaves. They come home to find a note and presents from their father, explaining that he will have to go back to Rome early after all, and that he's staying in the Teitou Hotel for that night. Learning that their mother is there as well, the girls teleport to the hotel and find their father there with the young woman from earlier. She leaves, and he waits in the lobby. Tomomi imagines a situation where their father tells their mother that he'll be living with the young woman from now on, and their love is gone. When they see their mother approaching for real, Mikage tries to stop the young woman from coming back, but is unsuccessful and breaks down in tears. The girls end up joining their parents, the young woman, and a young man for a meeting. Their father explains that the young woman is his secretary, and she's going to marry the young man, so he and the twins' mother helped select an engagement gift (the diamond necklace). It also turns out that the important thing their father wanted to talk about was the possibility of moving to Paris with the rest of his family, but due to work, it wouldn't work out in the near future. The next day, the girls present their father with a letter and presents, since they forgot it was his birthday yesterday. On the plane, their father opens the letter to find a photo of them.
45	"The Wife Comes Back?!"; Transliteration: "Tsuma, Kaeru?!" (Japanese: 妻帰る？)	November 12, 1993
Kageura wakes up to another day without his wife, Rika, surrounded by dirty dishes and clothes, and once again vows to expose the twins' secret. The girls are also running late that morning, with Tomomi being forced to buy a new ticket after her pass expires and subsequently making both of them miss the train. Kageura follows them to an empty alleyway and finally manages to catch them teleporting on video. At school, he invites the girls to visit his office during lunch, where he shows them the videotape. He offers them two choices: Either he will sell the tape to television, or they will cooperate and allow him to experiment on them. Just then, Noda interrupts, telling Kageura that the principal wanted to see him about his wife. Kageura learns that Rika was in a mountain-climbing accident, and he sprints home right away. He finds a letter from her that he missed that morning, which explains that she's going mountain-climbing on the mountain where they met in order to make up her mind on whether to finalize a divorce or return home. Kageura runs all the way to the mountain, and, unsatisfied with the rescue team's responses, goes off to rescue Rika himself. We see Rika walking along a city street, completely unharmed, and she sees a TV playing the news about the hiking accident, which happened to an all-girls club with no married members. Despite this, Kageura, still thinking that Rika is there, goes to climb the mountain by himself. Tomomi and Mikage teleport to the base of the mountain, pursuing Kageura to get their hands on the tape, and learn of the situation. Rika shows up and explains that she wasn't part of the party. The injured party is evacuated, but Kageura remains to be found. He is alive, but has fallen into a gorge and is stuck due to an injured leg. The girls and Rika learn that the search is being called off until morning due to the dark and the cold, and Rika breaks down, blaming herself. The girls decide to save him, and run off to teleport in private. They find Kageura half-frozen in the gorge and offer to teleport him back. He's confused at their kindness due to his actions earlier, but they insist on saving him, saying that they couldn't live with themselves if they let him die, so he takes their hands and all three teleport back to Rika. As the media approaches Kageura, he decides not to reveal the twins' secret, and throws the tape into a river, telling them he wandered around until he happened to come back. A few days later, Kageura has recovered, and Rika has started living with him again.
46	"Air Mail for Connecting a Heart"; Transliteration: "Kokoro Wo Tsunagu Eameeru" (Japanese: 心をつなぐエアメール)	November 19, 1993
One morning, Noda comes by the twins' house with a small child. He explains that the child is his cousin, Yuuji, whose parents are away as they make preparations to move the family to Borneo. Noda was asked to look after him, but his parents are away until that night, and he's already tired from looking after him the day before, so he asks the girls to take him for the day. Mikage refuses, but Tomomi agrees for the both of them. The girls take Yuuji to an amusement park, where he forces Mikage to go on the roller coaster with them. When she's shaken up by the experience, Tomomi suggests that they go to a movie instead, and Yuuji insists on seeing a romantic drama. He and the girls are surrounded by couples, and when the pair onscreen start to kiss, Yuuji starts yelling about it and trying to kiss Mikage, causing a scene and making the girls drag him out. They scold him, but are guilted into going easy on him when he starts crying. They then take him to a restaurant, but Mikage becomes annoyed by his behavior again and storms out of the restaurant. Tomomi follows her, and while they're outside, Yuuji suddenly darts out and runs away, having caused a huge scene in the restaurant by teasing the customers and ordering too much food. Yuuji runs away from the girls, taking a train, but they teleport to where he is and tell him that they're witches and flew on their brooms. He tries to run away again, but he trips on a bucket of water and gets soaked. Back home, Tomomi is hanging up his clothes to dry when a piece of paper falls out of his pocket. Unfolding it, Tomomi finds that it's a letter from Kurashige to Mikage; Yuuji had taken it from the mail earlier, intending but forgetting to give it to Mikage, but it's now unreadable thanks to the water. Noda comes by to get Yuuji and apologizes profusely when he finds out what happened, but Mikage is inconsolable, refusing to accept Yuuji's apology and telling him to go to London to get Kurashige to rewrite the letter. Yuuji runs away and gets soaked in the rain, managing to hitchhike on a truck to a bus station, where he catches a bus to the airport. However, he is exhausted at this point, and collapses outside. The girls, having looked everywhere for him with Noda, decide to try teleporting to where he is. They manage to do so and find that he's come down with a fever and is half-conscious. They teleport him back, but in their haste, they end up a few miles above their town, and quickly teleport again, landing safely in their bedroom. Mikage looks after Yuuji that night, allowing him to sleep in her bed. The next morning, Yuuji's parents come by, and thank the girls and Noda for their help. Yuuji says goodbye and shakes hands with Mikage, but is disappointed that he didn't teleport by doing so. After the girls make Noda promise to pay for the damages from yesterday, Mikage discovers a new letter from Kurashige, a follow-up telling her that he'll be visiting Japan soon for his cousin's wedding and he's looking forward to seeing her.
47	"An Angel with Many Scratches"; Transliteration: "Kizu Darake No Tenshi" (Japanese: 傷だらけの天使)	November 26, 1993
The girls have taken a part-time job at their mother's salon in order to pay for Christmas gifts for their partners. When they get there, a small child is having her hair done when the clock strikes seven, and she runs out of the chair to catch her favorite show on the television, a magical girl anime called Miracle Girls, where the main characters lock pinkies to blast the bad guys and teleport. Seeing this, Tomomi and Mikage remember how they used to play magical girls when they were little, calling themselves magical princesses. This was when they first found out they could teleport, accidentally transporting to a playground where a young Kurashige and Noda were playing. Meanwhile, the actresses from the TV show are having an argument; the actress playing Haruka wants to quit due to low pay, and the actress playing Mai is trying to convince her to stay on. A phone call comes in, informing the two of them that they've been offered roles on a famous TV show, which includes a pay raise. Both women are happy, but Mai is hesitant to quit Miracle Girls. The producer finds out about the change in roles and insists on meeting the two of them the next day. As he finishes an argument with the office, he spots Tomomi and Mikage teleporting inside a playground structure, but convinces himself that he's mistaken. At school, Yamagishi convinces the twins and Noda to come with him to the shooting of the latest Miracle Girls episode. However, the shooting is just ending, since the actresses never showed up. Noda and Yamagishi leave, but the girls approach the lone producer, and he tells them his woes about things changing too quickly and how disappointed he is in the actresses for giving up on the show. The girls ask him where the actresses are now. Mai and Haruka are in the waiting room for their auditions when the twins suddenly teleport in, shocking them. Speaking and moving as one, the girls ask the actresses to continue Miracle Girls, reminding them of the kids who love the program and the producer who's put his heart into it. The twins teleport away, and the actresses leave the room, running to the park to meet the producer and apologize to him. To his delight, they agree to continue the show.
48	"We Meet Fate Again"; Transliteration: "Unmei No Saikai" (Japanese: 運命の再開)	December 3, 1993
Kurashige isn't due back until the day after next, but Mikage is already in a hurry to prepare, putting together a good outfit for him. While looking for a ribbon, she finds the photograph she was sent of Kurashige and Marie, and explains that she couldn't bear to throw it away since it has Kurashige in it, and he did end up telling her that he and Marie had no relationship. In Diamas, Marie visits her bedridden father. He tells her that since she'll be eighteen soon, he's trying to arrange an engagement for her, but she tells him she's already preparing for that herself. He's excited to meet her prospective fiance, but then tells her that he wants her to meet with Emma, her twin sister, first, since Diamas tradition dictates that inheritance is shared between twins. Marie argues that Emma has been missing for almost their whole lives, but her father explains that he's been keeping tabs on her for years. Meanwhile, a man in a military-like uniform tells the blonde man with sunglasses (from earlier episodes in Diamas) that Emma's whereabouts are unknown. The blonde man states that they must assassinate Emma in order to obtain the powers of Diamas. Marie's father faints from exhaustion, and she scolds him gently, reminding him not to overwork. In his confusion, he calls her Emma and asks for her forgiveness. She leaves the room to let him rest and remembers that he left her a long time ago to go away for his health. She had cried, begging to go with him, but the blonde man had stopped her, telling her that as the future queen, she had to be strong. In the present, she angrily tears up Emma's photo. The blonde man, who we learn is called Mr. X, asks her what's wrong, and she tells him that she's angry that her father is only concerned about Emma, while she's been trying to take care of Diamas this whole time. He reminds her that her father has a right to worry about Emma, but agrees that her lineage should take precedence. Marie makes her bodyguards take her to Kurashige's place, but finds it empty. Learning that he's gone back to Japan, she makes arrangements to go there right away. Back in Japan, the girls and Noda are watching a track and field meet. They suddenly spot Emma running with the team and remember her from the ski lodge. They meet up with her in a cafe, but just as she's telling them she's been fine, she spots two men in suits and sunglasses and runs away. The next day, Tomomi and Emma are preparing to race against each other. Tomomi barely manages to win the race, receiving a trophy for her efforts. After the race, Emma is late meeting up with them, so Mikage goes to look for her. She finds Emma being stuffed into a car and driven off, and calls Tomomi for help. The girls manage to teleport on top of the car and cause the driver to crash. The twins and Emma escape, pursued by the men in suits, and manage to make the men get on a bus and be taken away. Emma tells the girls that she is a twin as well, but she and her older sister were separated at birth; her sister stayed with their father, and she was shuffled around various families as a foster child. Emma says that she hopes to meet her sister someday. As she leaves, she is met by two different men in suits, who kneel to her and say that they've come to pick her up. On their way home, the girls tell Noda the story, and continue to wonder why Emma is being pursued. A limo suddenly stops in front of them, and Marie gets out. She warns Mikage to stay away from Kurashige, upsetting and confusing her.
49	"Farewell Senpai"; Transliteration: "Sayonara Senpai" (Japanese: さよなら先輩)	December 10, 1993
Mikage and Tomomi study the picture of Kurashige and Marie, confirming that the young woman who confronted them earlier was indeed her. Tomomi suddenly realizes that Marie looks just like Emma, and that she's likely Emma's twin sister. Later, Mikage is at the airport, waiting for Kurashige, but Marie intercepts her with several bodyguards. When Kurashige shows up, Marie hops over the guardrail to meet him first. However, while she's distracted by security, Kurashige leaves to meet up with Mikage. Marie shoves Mikage out of the way, but Kurashige rebuffs her advances, telling her that this isn't her country and she can't be so selfish. He leaves with Mikage, and Marie swears that she'll come back for him. On the bus, he admits that he didn't have to come home for his cousin's wedding, but he wanted an excuse to see Mikage. At school, Kageura assists Tomomi and Noda by gathering several research files from Diamas. Reading from one file, he explains that Diamas is a country with many legends, in particular the legend of the twin princesses. It is said that over a thousand years ago, Vikings ransacked the small nation, but the twin princesses of the country joined their hearts as one and vanquished them. Since then, the people of Diamas have believed that their country flourishes under the rule of twin princesses. He goes on to explain that Emma is in fact one of the current twin princesses; according to his research, one of the twin princesses has been missing for almost eighteen years, which matches Emma's age. Tomomi and Noda leave to search for Emma and tell her about Marie, but they learn that Emma has transferred schools. That evening, Tomomi asks for Mikage's help in researching Diamas, explaining that since Emma appears to be in trouble, Marie will want to help her, just like Mikage would want to help Tomomi and vice versa. The girls teleport to the embassy where Marie is. There, Marie is trying to go see Kurashige, but is stopped by her guards, who tell her that Mr. X wants her to be safe. As Tomomi and Mikage eavesdrop, the guards remind Marie that she must ascend the throne, and if something happens to her, Emma will be Queen. Marie declares her intentions to marry Kurashige and rule Diamas; hearing this, Mikage makes a noise, but the girls manage to teleport away before they're discovered. Back home, Mikage is furious. Tomomi tries to calm her down by reminding her that Kurashige would never agree to marry Marie, but Mikage worries about what lengths Marie would go to. The next day, Marie catches Kurashige after his cousin's wedding and sticks to him as he walks around town. She informs him of her intentions to marry him, trying to sweeten the deal by telling him that he could study wherever he wanted, and he could even remain living in Japan as long as she moved there too. However, he firmly turns her down, telling her that his heart belongs to Mikage, and no matter her political power, she can't control his heart. The next day, Marie meets with Mikage and brings her to the embassy to tell her once again to give up on Kurashige. Marie tries to plant doubt in Mikage about Kurashige, but Mikage is stubborn, insisting that Kurashige is his own person and can decide who he loves, and he would never accept a position of power just handed out to him instead of earned. Mikage tries to leave, but Marie's bodyguards seize her and imprison her in a room. Mikage calls out to Tomomi for help as one of the guards, Mr. X's right hand man, tells her that he'll let her go if she tells him where Emma is. Tomomi shows up at the front gate, but is told that Mikage isn't there. She lets it slip to Marie that she knows about Emma, and just then, Kurashige and Noda show up, and Kurashige demands that Marie release Mikage. The three are allowed inside, but Marie stops them, demanding Kurashige's answer once more about their potential marriage. Tomomi runs off to free Mikage, but when the girls come back, Noda and Kurashige have been captured, and Marie demands that Mikage never see Kurashige again. In order to free everyone, Kurashige agrees to go with Marie, and the other three are led outside.
50	"The Princesses Together"; Transliteration: "Futari No Oujo" (Japanese: 二人の王女)	December 17, 1993
Marie has brought Kurashige back to Diamas and prepared a room in the castle just for him. He reminds her that he won't blindly obey everything she says no matter how nice she is to him. Marie ignores him and leaves, telling him that she'll introduce him to her father later. As soon as she's gone, Mr. X warns Kurashige to behave until the coronation ceremony. Meanwhile, Emma returns to Diamas with the men who had greeted her earlier, all three of them in disguise to avoid their pursuers. Mr. X is furious when he learns she is back in the country, worrying that their assassination plot will be discovered if Emma's identity becomes public knowledge. Marie and Kurashige are prevented from seeing her father, and Marie is shocked to learn that it is not her father's doctors, but her father himself who refuses to see her. As Marie storms off, we see that Emma is with her father, the men who brought her there having been hired by him and not Mr. X. Her father believes that Marie will understand someday and they can all live happily together. Later, Marie is trying on her wedding dress, but she throws a fit, tearing everything off and demanding to be left alone. She thinks about Emma and how happy her father was when thinking of her. In a fit, she breaks the mirror she's looking into, cutting her hand in the process. Kurashige bandages her hand, and she spills her heart to him, telling him that her father loves Emma more than her, and despite that they're father and daughter, they've spent hardly any time together at all. Kurashige reassures her that it's okay to cry, and comforts her as she sobs. Back in Japan, Tomomi, Mikage, and Noda are researching Diamas. Noda suggests that the girls teleport to him, but Tomomi reminds him that a long-distance teleport will require more caution, especially as they're likely to be caught by the bodyguards again. However, Mikage insists that they go right away. Noda asks if he can come as well, since he wants to help in any way, and he promised to protect Tomomi no matter what. As they're about to leave, Kageura interrupts them, but before he can demand to come as well, the girls and Noda teleport away. In Diamas, Emma is admiring the flowers in the garden when she hears something in the bushes behind her. She is delighted to discover Tomomi and Noda. Mikage, however, winds up in the throne room, and is forced to leave when Mr. X shows up. Kurashige eavesdrops at the door as Mr. X and his associate discuss their plan to control Diamas by making the country lose their faith in their Queen. Mikage gets lost in the palace, and as she tries to hide from various approaching groups, Kurashige rescues her, taking her to his room. She begs him to let them take him back, but he refuses, explaining that he's worried about Marie due to the plot to usurp her and her unfounded hatred for Emma. He asks Mikage to help him, and she agrees. Meanwhile, Emma, who had snuck out to look for Mikage, is captured by Mr. X's men and thrown in a dungeon. She tells him that her father knows about his plot, but he informs her that Marie is his hostage in case things go wrong.
51	"Believing in Miracles"; Transliteration: "Kiseki Wo Shinjite" (Japanese: 奇跡を信じて)	December 24, 1993
Kurashige and Mikage sneak out, and Kurashige says that Emma may have been caught already, noticing the lack of guards. Meanwhile, Tomomi and Noda manage to meet with Marie's and Emma's father to explain the situation. He tells them that he wants Marie to realize on her own that Mr. X is evil, and that she and Emma can peacefully rule together. He wants a miracle to happen when Emma and Marie join their hearts, just like the twin princesses of the past and Tomomi and Mikage of the present. That evening, Kurashige meets Marie in private and tells her of Mr. X's plan, including the assassination plot, and that Emma doesn't want the throne, only her family. However, Marie insists that Emma must be trying to usurp her, and that her father and Kurashige only care about Emma. Unable to stand it, Mikage comes out of hiding and insists that Emma cares about Marie, but Marie becomes upset and calls for help. Kurashige runs away with Mikage, pursued by guards. At the same time, Noda and Tomomi are sneaking into the castle. Noda comments that it must be troublesome to have him there instead of Mikage, since he can't teleport, but Tomomi tells him that his presence is comforting, and only he can make her feel the way she does around him. In another part of the palace, the guards start firing on the fleeing Kurashige and Mikage, and Marie demands that they stop, worried that Kurashige will be hurt. Mr. X's right hand man tells her that it's an order from Mr. X, which shocks her, and she starts to realize that what Kurashige said might be true. Kurashige and Mikage hide inside a trapdoor, where he comforts her and apologizes for putting her in danger. However, she insists on staying to help him as she promised. Tomomi contacts her to let her know that she and Noda are heading to the basement, where Emma likely is. Marie makes it to the dungeon first and finally meets Emma. When Emma sees her, she apologizes for causing trouble, saying that she shouldn't have come back. Mr. X, arriving with his men, agrees with her. Marie demands that Emma be released, but Mr. X refuses, saying that it would cause trouble for them. Marie realizes that he's only acting for himself, and Emma reminds her of his plot. Mr. X's men throw Marie into the cell with Emma, and he promises that the intruders will join them soon. Left alone, Marie and Emma have a sisterly heart-to-heart before Tomomi and Noda show up, relieved to see Emma and surprised to see Marie. Mikage and Kurashige show up shortly after, and Tomomi and Mikage teleport inside the jail cell, and then teleport out with the twin princesses. Just then, Mr. X and his men reappear, pointing guns at the group. Thinking fast, Tomomi and Mikage manage to teleport everyone to a different part of the palace. They are once again pursued by Mr. X's men, but manage to fight them off and escape. However, they find themselves trapped when they end up on a dead-end balcony at the top of a tower. They climb to the roof, but their pursuers follow them, and the girls are unable to teleport, having used their strength to move everyone earlier. Mr. X tells them he's planning to kill them all, and make it look like an accident. Marie charges at him, but trips when a shot is fired at her feet, and falls off the roof. Emma falls off as well attempting to save her, and so do Tomomi and Mikage. As all four girls fall, Emma and Marie link hands and are filled with power, starting to glow along with the other twins when all four hold hands. They land in the lake, and a huge tower of light emerges from where they fell, bathing the land in light. The tower of light bursts apart, revealing all four girls hovering in the air. They fly safely back to the tower, and as Mr. X is stunned by the vision of the twin princesses, the princess' father shows up with his men, surrounding Mr. X and forcing him to surrender. Marie and Emma embrace their father, who promises that the three of them will always be together from now on. Later that day, Emma and Marie are crowned together. Tomomi and Noda are preparing to leave, but Mikage is still saying goodbye to Kurashige, who is going to remain in London to complete his studies. She promises that she'll always wait for him, and they kiss each other goodbye. Through a series of still images, we see the girls celebrating Christmas with their parents, Noda, Yamagishi, Daijoji, Kageura, and Rika, while Mikage reads a letter from Kurashige. In a bonus scene, the girls and their partners make predictions for the future. Noda says that he'll continue to be ordered around by Tomomi, and Kurashige will continue to pursue Mikage romantically. Tomomi comments that thanks to everyone's good cheer, their wishes have come true, and the girls thank everyone for the miracles over the last year.

== Notes ==
- Due to a missing translation, the summaries for episodes 15-28 and 33-36 may be lacking important information.
