= List of animated feature films of 1993 =

This is a list of animated feature films first released in 1993.

== List ==
Title	Country	Director	Production company	Animation technique	Format	Notes	Release date	Duration
The 1001 Gags of Spiff and Hercules; Les Mille et Une Farces de Pif et Hercule	France	Bruno Desraisses, Charles de Latour	Studio de Pyongyang	Traditional	Theatrical		February 10, 1993	80 minutes
Al Caral's Legacy アル・カラルの遺産 (Aru Kararu no Isan)	Japan	Kôichi Ishiguro	Animate Film; Tokuma Japan Communications; Visual '80	Traditional	Direct-to-video; OVA		January 25, 1993	75 minutes
Art of Fighting バトルスピリッツ 龍虎の拳 (Battle Spirits Ryūko no Ken)	Japan	Hiroshi Fukutomi	Studio Comet; NAS; Fuji TV	Traditional	Television special		December 23, 1993	46 minutes
Batman: Mask of the Phantasm	United States	Eric Radomski; Bruce Timm	Warner Bros. Animation; Warner Bros. Family Entertainment	Traditional	Theatrical		December 25, 1993	78 minutes
Big Wars: Red Zone, Divine Annihilation ビッグ・ウォーズ 神撃つ朱き荒野に (Biggu Wōzu: Kami Utsu Akaki Kōya ni)	Japan	Toshifumi Takizawa; Issei Kume	Magic Bus	Traditional	Theatrical		September 25, 1993	75 minutes
Blue Memory: Manmo Pioneers and Boys 蒼い記憶 満蒙開拓と少年たち (Aoi Kioku: Manmō Kaitaku to Shōnen-tachi)	Japan	Tetsu Dezaki	Magic Bus	Traditional	Theatrical		December 18, 1993	90 minutes
Bonobono ぼのぼの	Japan	Mikio Igarashi; Yūji Mutō (Animation)	Amuse Video; Bandai Visual; Group TAC; Nippon Shuppan Hanbai, Inc. Takeshobo	Traditional	Theatrical		November 13, 1993	103 minutes
The Cat's Mill; Kakisu dzirnavas	Latvia	Roze Stiebra	Dauka	Traditional	Theatrical			58 minutes
Columbus's Great Adventures コロンブスの大冒険 (Koronbusu no Daibōken)	Japan	Yorifusa Yamaguchi	SPO; AB Productions	Traditional	Direct-to-video; OVA		January 1, 1993	70 minutes
Coo: Tōi Umi kara Kita Coo; COO: 遠い海から来たCOO (Kū: Tōi Umi kara Kita Kū)	Japan	Tetsuo Imazawa	Toei Animation	Traditional	Theatrical		December 19, 1993	116 minutes
Crayon Shin-chan: Action Kamen vs Leotard Devil クレヨンしんちゃん アクション仮面VSハイグレ魔王 (Kureyon Shinchan: Akushon Kamen tai Haigure Maō)	Japan	Mitsuru Hongo	Shin-Ei Animation	Traditional	Theatrical	First feature film installment of the Crayon Shin-chan anime series.	July 24, 1993	93 minutes
Crimson Wolf 紅狼 (Hon Ran)	Japan	Shoichi Masuo	A.P.P.P. Shogakukan-Shueisha Productions	Traditional	Direct-to-video; OVA		July 7, 1993	59 minutes
David Copperfield	Canada	Don Arioli	Cinemotion; PMMP; Astral Media; NBC Productions	Traditional	Television film		December 10, 1993	92 minutes
Desert Rose ~ The Snow Apocalypse 砂の薔薇（デザート・ローズ） 「雪の黙示録」 (Suna no Bara (Desert Rose) – Yuki no Mokushiroku)	Japan	Yasunao Aoki	Hakusensha; J.C. Staff; Toei Video Co., Ltd.	Traditional	Direct-to-video; OVA		April 25, 1993	47 minutes
Doraemon: Nobita and the Tin Labyrinth ドラえもん のび太とブリキの迷宮(ラビリンス) (Doraemon: Nobita to Buriki no Rabirinsu)	Japan	Tsutomu Shibayama	Asatsu; Shin-Ei Animation; Toho (distributor)	Traditional	Theatrical		March 6, 1993	100 minutes
Dragon Ball Z: Bojack Unbound ドラゴンボールZ 銀河ギリギリ!!ぶっちぎりの凄い奴 (Doragon Bōru Zetto: Ginga Giri-Giri!! Butchigiri no Sugoi Yatsu)	Japan	Yoshihiro Ueda	Toei Animation	Traditional	Theatrical		July 10, 1993	51 minutes
Dragon Ball Z: Broly – The Legendary Super Saiyan ドラゴンボールZ 燃えつきろ!!熱戦・烈戦・超激戦戦 (Doragon Bōru Zetto Moetsukiro!! Nessen Ressen Chō-Gekisen)	Japan	Shigeyasu Yamauchi	Toei Animation	Traditional	Theatrical		March 6, 1993	72 minutes
Dragon Ball Z: The History of Trunks ドラゴンボールゼット 絶望への反抗!!残された超戦士・悟飯とトランクス (Doragon Bōru Zetto: Zetsubō e no Hankō!! Nokosareta Chō-Senshi • Gohan to Torankusu)	Japan	Yoshihiro Ueda	Toei Animation; Fuji TV	Traditional	Television special	Second Dragon Ball Z television special; broadcast between episodes 175 ("The Games Begin") and 176 ("Losers Fight First").	February 24, 1993	48 minutes
E.Y.E.S. of Mars; MOTHER 最後の少女イヴ (Mother: Saigo no Shōjo Eve)	Japan	Iku Suzuki	Toei Animation	Traditional	Theatrical		December 26, 1993	80 minutes
The Fantastic Voyages of Sinbad	Australia	Douglas Richards	Burbank Animation Studios	Traditional	Television film			50 minutes
Fatal Fury 2: The New Battle バトルファイターズ餓狼伝説2 (Batoru Faitāzu Garō Densetsu Tsū)	Japan	Kazuhiro Furuhashi	NAS; Fuji TV	Traditional	Television film		July 31, 1993	75 minutes
The Gigolo - Dochinpira どチンピラ (Dochinpira)	Japan	Hiromitsu Ōta	Studio Kikan; Studio Marine	Traditional	Direct-to-video; OVA		August 27, 1993	45 minutes
Go Hugo Go; Jungledyret (Jungle Animal)	Denmark	Stefan Fjeldmark; Flemming Quist Møller	A. Film A/S	Traditional	Theatrical		December 10, 1993	73 minutes
The Halloween Tree	United States	Mario Piluso	Hanna-Barbera	Traditional	Television film		October 2, 1993	69 minutes
The History of the Wonderful World; Verdenshistorien	Denmark	Anders Sørensen; Hans Perk	Tegnedrengene; Filmforsyningen ApS; Statens Filmcentral	Traditional	Theatrical			52 minutes
Hollyrock-a-Bye Baby	United States	William Hanna	Hanna-Barbera Productions	Traditional	Television film		December 5, 1993	90 minutes
I Yabba-Dabba Do!	United States	William Hanna	Hanna-Barbera Productions	Traditional	Television film		February 7, 1993	92 minutes
Jonny's Golden Quest	United States	Don Lusk; Paul Sommer	Hanna-Barbera Productions	Traditional	Television film		April 4, 1993	87 minutes
Kappa: A River Goblin and Sampei カッパの三平	Japan	Toshio Hirata	Nikkatsu Children's Movie; Romantic Planning; Takahashi Studio	Traditional	Theatrical		March 13, 1993	90 minutes
Legend of the Galactic Heroes: Overture to a New War 銀河英雄伝説 新たなる戦いの序曲(オーヴァチュア) (Ginga Eiyū Densetsu: Arata Naru Tatakai no Jokyoku (Ōvuachua))	Japan	Ken'ichi Maeda	Magic Bus	Traditional	Theatrical		December 18, 1993	90 minutes
Lupin III: Voyage to Danger ルパン三世『ルパン暗殺指令』 (Rupan Sansei: Rupan Ansatsu Shirei)	Japan	Masaaki Osumi	Tokyo Movie Shinsha; Nippon TV	Traditional	Television special		July 23, 1993	90 minutes
Mafalda	Cuba; Spain	Juan Padrón	D.G. Producciones S.A.	Traditional	Theatrical			80 minutes
Mellow 女郎（めろう）	Japan	Teruo Kogure	Knack Productions	Traditional	Direct-to-video; OVA		July 23, 1993	45 minutes
Mermaid's Scar 人魚の傷 (Ningyo no Kizu)	Japan	Morio Asaka	Madhouse	Traditional	Direct-to-video; OVA		September 24, 1993	45 minutes
Mobile Suit SD Gundam Festival 機動戦士SDガンダムまつり (Kidō Senshi SD Gundam Matsuri)	Japan	Takashi Imanishi (Part 1); Tetsuro Amino (Parts 2 & 3)	Bandai Visual; Sotsu Co., Ltd. Sunrise	Traditional	Theatrical		March 13, 1993	81 minutes
The Nightmare Before Christmas	United States	Henry Selick	Skellington Productions	Stop motion	Theatrical		October 29, 1993	76 minutes
Ninja Scroll 獣兵衛忍風帖 (Jūbei Ninpūchō)	Japan	Yoshiaki Kawajiri	Madhouse; Animate Film; JVC; Toho; Movic	Traditional	Theatrical		June 5, 1993	94 minutes
Ocean Waves a.k.a. I Can Hear the Sea 海がきこえる (Umi ga Kikoeru)	Japan	Tomomi Mochizuki	Studio Ghibli	Traditional	Television film		May 5, 1993	72 minutes
Offside オフサイド	Japan	Takao Yotsuji (Chief Director); Hisashi Abe (Animation Director)	Sakatsu Suzuki; Shigetoshi Tanaka	Traditional	Direct-to-video; OVA		January 22, 1993	50 minutes
Oishinbo: Nichibei Kome Sensō 美味しんぼ 日米コメ戦争 (The Gourmet: The Japanese-American Rice War)	Japan	Yoshio Takeuchi	Shin-Ei Animation; Studio Deen (Cooperation); Nippon TV	Traditional	Television special		December 3, 1993	89 minutes
Once Upon a Forest	United Kingdom; United States	Charles Grosvenor	Hanna-Barbera; HTV Cymru/Wales	Traditional	Theatrical		June 18, 1993	71 minutes
Opera Imaginaire; Opéra imaginaire (Imaginary Opera)	France	José Abel (segment "E lucevan le stelle"); Hilary Audus (segment "Le Veau d'Or"); Jonathan Hills (segment "Madame Butterfly"); Raimund Krumme (segment "Du also bist mein Braütigam?"); Guionne Leroy (segment "Noi siamo zingarelle"); Ken Lidster (segment "Vesti la Giubba"); Jimmy T. Murakami (segment "Pêcheurs de perles"); Stephen Palmer (segment "Cendrillon"); Monique Renault (segment "La donna è mobile"); Pascal Roulin (segments "Lakmé", "Voi che sapete", "Carmen" and introduction sequences"); Christophe Vallaux (segment "Carmen")	Pascavision; Club d'Investissement Média (in association with); F3 (in association with); Institut National de l'Audiovisuel (INA) (in association with); Aniway (camera) (segment "Noi siamo zingarelle"); Ex Machina (computer graphics) (segments "Lakmé", "Carmen" and introduction sequences); Cel Out Films (trace and paint) (segment "Le Veau d'Or"); Institut National de l'Audiovisuel (INA) (computer graphics) (segment "Du also bist mein Braütigam?"); Colour Crew (coloring) (segment "Cendrillon"); Mike Hibbert Animation (xerox) (segment "Pêcheurs de perles"); Cosgrove Hall Films (production services) (segment "Pêcheurs de perles"); Framestore (production services) (segment "Madame Butterfly"); Nederlands Fonds voor de Film (financial support) (segment "La donna è mobile"); Co-Productiefonds Binnenlandse Omroep (financial support) (segment "La donna è mobile"); Bareboards Productions (production services) (segment "Vesti la Giubba"); The Foundation for Sport and the Arts (financial support) (segment "Vesti la Giubba")	Traditional/Stop motion/CGI	Television film Anthology film		March 12, 1993	51 minutes
Patlabor 2: The Movie 機動警察パトレイバー 2 the Movie (Kidō Keisatsu Patoreibā the Movie 2)	Japan	Mamoru Oshii	Production I.G. Shochiku	Traditional	Theatrical		August 7, 1993	113 minutes
Puss in Boots	Australia	Richard Slapczynski	Burbank Animation Studios; Holric Entertainment Group; INI Entertainment Group	Traditional	Television film			50 minutes
Rail of the Star お星さまのレール (O-Hoshisama no Rail)	Japan	Toshio Hirata	Madhouse	Traditional	Theatrical		July 10, 1993	80 minutes
Rokudenashi Blues 1993 ろくでなしBLUES 1993 (Rokudenashi Burūsu 1993)	Japan	Hiroyuki Kakudō	Toei Animation	Traditional	Theatrical		July 24, 1993	85 minutes
Sailor Moon R: The Movie 劇場版 美少女戦士セーラームーンR (Gekijō-ban Bishōjo Senshi Sērā Mūn R)	Japan	Kunihiko Ikuhara	Toei Animation	Traditional	Theatrical	First feature film installment of the Sailor Moon series.	December 5, 1993	62 minutes
Sangokushi (dai 2-bu): Chōkō Moyu! 三国志（第２部）長江焼ゆ！ (Romance of the Three Kingdoms (Part 2): The Yangtze River Burns!)	Japan	Tomoharu Katsumata	Toei Animation; Enoki Films	Traditional	Theatrical	Part two of a three-part animated film series based on the Chinese novel Romance of the Three Kingdoms.	March 18, 1993	149 minutes
The Secret Adventures of Tom Thumb	United Kingdom	Dave Borthwick	bolexbrothers	Stop motion	?		December 10, 1993	60 minutes
Song of the Chimney Ghosts おばけ煙突のうた (Obake Entotsu no Uta)	Japan	Yutaka Osawa	Studio Junio	Traditional	Theatrical		May 29, 1993	42 minutes
Soreike! Anpanman Kyōryū Nosshī no Daibōken それいけ! アンパンマン 恐竜ノッシーの大冒険 (Let's Go! Anpanman: Nosshi the Dinosaur's Big Adventure)	Japan	Akinori Nagaoka	Tokyo Movie Shinsha	Traditional	Theatrical		July 17, 1993	60 minutes
Street Fighter 거리의 무법자 (Georiui mubeopja)	South Korea	Sim San-gil	Daewon Donghwa	Traditional	Theatrical		December 29, 1993	51 minutes
Special Gag Force Robot Twins 개그 특공대 로봇 트윈스 (Gaegeuteuggongdae lobosteuwinseu)	South Korea	Kim Cheong-gi	BM Movie	Traditional	Theatrical		January 16, 1993	73 minutes
Suikoden Demon Century 妖世紀水滸伝 魔星降臨 (Yōseiki Suikoden – Masei Kōrin)	Japan	Hiroshi Negishi	J.C. Staff; Kadokawa Shoten; Nippon Victor	Traditional	Direct-to-video; OVA		September 25, 1993	46 minutes
Tama of 3rd Street: Please! Search for Momo-chan!! 3丁目のタマ おねがい!モモちゃんを捜して!! (San-chōme no Tama: Onegai! Momo-chan o Sagashite!!)	Japan	Hitoshi Nanba	Group TAC	Traditional	Theatrical		August 14, 1993	43 minutes
The Thief and the Cobbler a.k.a. The Princess and the Cobbler a.k.a. Arabian Knight	United States; United Kingdom; Canada	Richard Williams	Richard Williams Productions / Allied Filmmakers	Traditional	Theatrical	Holds the record for being the longest production time for an animated feature at 29 years (1964–1993). Also the final appearances of Vincent Price and Sir Anthony Quayle.	September 23, 1993	91 minutes
Thumbelina	Australia	Richard Slapczynski	Burbank Animation Studios	Traditional	Television film			50 minutes
Weird Volunteers へんてこなボランティア (Henteko na Volunteer)	Japan	Kimio Yabuki	Toei Company	Traditional	Educational film			46 minutes
We're Back! A Dinosaur's Story	United States	Dick Zondag; Ralph Zondag; Phil Nibbelink; Simon Wells	Amblimation	Traditional	Theatrical	First non-Disney animated feature to use digital ink and paint.	November 24, 1993	71 minutes

== Highest-grossing animated films of the year ==
Rank	Title	Studio	Worldwide gross	Ref.
1	The Nightmare Before Christmas	Skellington Productions/Walt Disney Pictures	$75,082,668	
2	Doraemon: Nobita and the Tin Labyrinth	Asatsu / Toho	$16,311,900 (¥1.65 billion)	
3	Dragon Ball Z 8: The Legendary Super Saiyan	Toei Animation	$13,543,820 (¥1.37 billion)	
4	Dragon Ball Z 9: Bojack Unbound	Toei Animation	$12,950,660 (¥1.31 billion)	
5	We're Back! A Dinosaur's Story	Amblimation / Universal Pictures	$9,317,021	
6	Once Upon a Forest	Hanna Barbara / 20th Century Fox	$6,582,052	
7	Batman: Mask of the Phantasm	Warner Bros. Animation	$5,863,139	

== See also ==
- List of animated television series of 1993
