= Nami Akimoto =

Japanese manga artist

- 秋元奈美
- Born: January 24, 1968 (age 58); Atsugi, Kanagawa, Japan
- Occupation: manga artist
- Years active: 1986–present
- Known for: Miracle Girls; Ultra Cute; Loving You

Nami Akimoto (秋元 奈美, Akimoto Nami) is a Japanese manga artist from Atsugi, Kanagawa Prefecture. Some manga series she wrote include Miracle Girls and Loving You, the latter of which won the Nakayoshi Best New Artist Award.

== Works ==
- Hanamaru Company (花まるカンパニー, Hanamaru Kanpanī)
- Peanuts Avenue (Pなつ通り)
- Miracle Girls
- Tenshi ni KISS (天使にKISS)
- Mighty Angel
- Mezase! Manga Daioh (めざせ！マンガ大王)
- Snowdrop
- Mille Fleurs
- Kono Ao ni Koi o Shita (この青に恋をした)
- Kokoro made Idaite (心まで抱いて)
- Ultra Cute
- Virgin Lesson
- Venus Project
- Puri Hani

=== Collaboration work ===
- Nude na Onna (ヌードな女, Nūdo na Onna)
