= List of The Irresponsible Captain Tylor episodes =

The Irresponsible Captain Tylor anime and OVA series is based on The Most Irresponsible Man in Space series of light novels by Hitoshi Yoshioka. The series began as a 26-part TV series broadcast on TV Tokyo and ran from January 25 to July 19, 1993. All episodes were directed by Kōichi Mashimo, and were produced by Tatsunoko Production. The OVA was a 10-part series released between October 1, 1994, and August 1, 1996. All episodes were directed between Mashimo and Koji Sawai, and were produced by Studio Deen. The story follows the career of Justy Ueki Tylor, a young man who decided to join the United Planets Space Force believing it will lead to an easy life. He later finds himself in command of his own spaceship, the Soyokaze, where he finds himself at odds with his military enemy, the Raalgon Empire, and his own crew due to his laid-back manner.

The TV series featured an opening and closing performed by Mari Sasaki: "Just Think Of Tomorrow" and "Downtown Dance" respectively. They, along with the rest of the soundtrack for both the TV series and OVA were released by AnimeTrax on June 5, 2001.

The TV series was released in the United States by Right Stuf first on VHS between October 21, 1997, and July 21, 1998, and was later released on DVD on January 30, 2001. The OVA was released on DVD between July 31 and September 25, 2001. The series was released as a digitally remastered thinkpak by Right Stuf's division Nozomi Entertainment, with the TV series released on May 26, 2009, and the OVA on August 28, 2009.

== Episodes ==
=== TV series ===
No.	Title	Written by	Original release date
1	"The Mysterious Irresponsible Man"; Transliteration: "Nazo no Musekinin Otoko" (Japanese: なぞの無責任男)	Naoto Kimura	January 25, 1993
Twenty-year-old Justy Ueki Tylor decides to join the United Planets Space Force, planning to get a cushy job and retire with a large pension. However, he is unaware that tensions are going between the UPSF and the Holy Raalgon Empire.
2	"Hey, Ho! The Happy Pensioned Life!"; Transliteration: "Iyotsu! Hana no Nenkin Seikatsu" (Japanese: いよっ! 花の年金生活)	Mami Watanabe	February 1, 1993
Tylor lands himself a job in the pension department and decides to give a retired admiral, Hanner, his pension in person. However, as he does he finds himself unwittingly caught in a hostage situation.
3	"The Ship Sets Sail, but Misgivings Remain"; Transliteration: "Kan (Fune) wa Dete Iku Shikoru wa Nokoru" (Japanese: 艦(ふね)は出ていく シコリは残る)	Hiroyuki Kawasaki	February 8, 1993
Following his tackling of the hostage situation, Tylor is made captain of the Soyokaze - an old, rusty space ship used as a dumping ground for the USPFs more troublesome troops. The crew of the Soyokaze are less than impressed by their new captain.
4	"Enemy! Crisis! We Surrender!"; Transliteration: "Tekida! Pinchida! Kōsanda!" (Japanese: 敵だ!ピンチだ! 降参だ!)	Hiroyuki Kawasaki	February 15, 1993
There are heated battles between the Soyokaze's marines and their lone fighter pilot, so Tylor decides to try and solve the problem himself.
5	"'Angel in White' Begins With an 'H'"; Transliteration: "H(Ecchi) de Hajimaru Hakui no Tenshi" (Japanese: H(エッチ)ではじまる 白衣の天使)	Mami Watanabe	February 22, 1993
A new crew member joins the Soyokaze, a female nurse called Harumi. Suddenly every male crew member is trying to woo her, but she hides a dark secret.
6	"The Tale of the Lizard's Tail"; Transliteration: "Tokage no Shippo no Shippo" (Japanese: トカゲの しっぽのしっぽ)	Hiroyuki Kawasaki	March 1, 1993
Annoyed by Tylor's recent successes, Admirals Fuji and Mifune attempt to assassinate him by giving him a dangerous device(not a bomb) inside a medal.
7	"A Gentleman's Word is His Bond"; Transliteration: "Shinshi Kyōtei ga Manga Man" (Japanese: 紳士協定 がまんがまん)	Naoto Kimura	March 8, 1993
Yuriko is becoming increasingly annoyed by the male crew and their lax attitude toward regulations. She attempts to sort out the problem, but is interrupted by an attack from the Raalgons.
8	"Life is Short, So Girls Should Kill"; Transliteration: "Inochi Mijikashi, Korose ya Otome" (Japanese: 命短し、 殺せや乙女)	Mami Watanabe	March 15, 1993
Harumi is ordered to take more drastic action in tackling Tylor. However, the captain is too occupied by the ship's beauty contest.
9	"When You Wish Upon a Flower"; Transliteration: "Hana Uranai ni Inori o Komete" (Japanese: 花占いに 祈りを込めて)	Hiroyuki Kawasaki	March 22, 1993
Tylor and the rest of the crew have been demoted. The crew therefore plead to him to appeal the high command's decision in person before a set time.
10	"Mind's Eyes Half Blind, Headed For a Rough Ride"; Transliteration: "Shingan, Kingan, Dogandogan" (Japanese: 心眼、近眼、 ドガンドガン)	Hiroyuki Kawasaki	March 29, 1993
The ship's fighter pilot, Kojiro, who has a strong dislike of women, is forced to train twin sisters Emi and Yumi Hanner as pilots.
11	"In Demotion Does a Woman Bloom"; Transliteration: "Sasen (Naga) Sarete On'na Zakari" (Japanese: 左遷(なが)されて 女ざかり)	Mami Watanabe	April 5, 1993
Yuriko is still annoyed by the crew's refusal to stick with the ship's regulations, especially by Kim's attitudes towards uniform.
12	"The Day the Soyokaze Vanished"; Transliteration: "Soyokaze ga Kieta Hi" (Japanese: そよかぜが消えた日)	Hiroyuki Kawasaki	April 12, 1993
Tylor learns of an old story about a former demoted Soyokaze crew and their distraught captain. Soon the ship disappears and they find themselves battling the ghost of the former disgraced captain.
13	"Be Prepared, Be Smart, or Be Lucky"; Transliteration: "Yoshū・Fukushū・Fu Benkyō" (Japanese: 予習・復習・不勉強)	Hiroyuki Kawasaki	April 19, 1993
Raalgon admiral Donan returns to take his revenge on the Soyokaze. Tylor comes up with a plan to defeat him - sailing directly through the front lines.
14	"Equation of Kindness"; Transliteration: "Yasashi-sa no Hōteishiki" (Japanese: やさしさの方程式)	Mami Watanabe	April 26, 1993
Following their last battle, the crew of the Soyokaze face another battle with another Raalgon commander, Sia-Has.
15	"Shiny! Happy! (Deadly) Germs!"; Transliteration: "Kinkin Kiken'na Byōgenkin" (Japanese: キンキン危険な病原菌)	Hiroyuki Kawasaki	May 3, 1993
The Raalgon order Harumi to release an engineered virus to infect the entire crew. After it is released, it is revealed that the only way to get the cure is to hand over Tylor to the Raalgons.
16	"Strange Love"; Transliteration: "Sutorenji Rabu" (Japanese: ストレンジ ラブ)	Kenichi Kanemaki	May 10, 1993
While held captive by the Raalgons, Tylor manages to escape and have a midnight feast. However, he unwittingly shares it with Empress Azalyn, leader of the Raalgon Empire. The two soon begin a relationship.
17	"The Unjust Desert"; Transliteration: "Jingi Naki Dasshutsu" (Japanese: 仁義なき脱出)	Mami Watanabe	May 17, 1993
Back at the UPSF base the Soyokaze crew learn that Tylor has not been successful in his appeal and is to be killed. They thus plan to escape quarantine and rescue the captain.
18	"A Place for Confessions"; Transliteration: "Kokuhaku no Yukue" (Japanese: 告白の行方)	Hiroyuki Kawasaki	May 24, 1993
The Soyokaze crew are now on the run from UPSF as well as being under attack by the Raalgons, but are determined to rescue Tylor, who is currently working as Azalyn's pet.
19	"Sleeping Beauty"; Transliteration: "Nemuremori no Bishōjo" (Japanese: 眠れる森の美少女)	Mami Watanabe	May 31, 1993
Tylor is injured. It is discovered that the Raalgons have implanted something in his brain and the only way to solve the problems is to synch up his brain waves with those of someone else. Yuriko volunteers, but Azalyn wants to help as well.
20	"Well Handled Solutions"; Transliteration: "Yoki ni Hakarae Zengosaku" (Japanese: よきに計らえ善後策)	Hiroyuki Kawasaki	June 7, 1993
Following his recovery the marines lend Tylor their most prize possession: a porn film. Meanwhile, Prime Minister Wang is planning a coup to make himself Emperor of the Raalgon Empire.
21	"Paco-Paco Junior!"; Transliteration: "Pako-Pako Juna!" (Japanese: パコパコ ジュニア!)	Kenichi Kanemaki	June 14, 1993
Yuriko and Yamamoto want to treat Azalyn as a prisoner of war, while the Raalgons want her to be returned. Not keen on either idea, Azayln attempts to stay with Tylor by claiming she is pregnant with Tylor's child.
22	"Force of One"; Transliteration: "Tatta Hitori no Guntai" (Japanese: たったひとりの軍隊)	Hiroyuki Kawasaki	June 21, 1993
After Tylor decides to release Azalyn, Fuji and Mifune decide to punish him by putting him to death by firing squad. The Soyokaze crew have to rescue him.
23	"The Longest Day in Space"; Transliteration: "Uchū de Ichiban Nagai Hi" (Japanese: 宇宙で一番長い日)	Hiroyuki Kawasaki	June 28, 1993
The Raalgon are on the march towards the UPSF. Tylor however manages to come up with a solution to winning the war, without the Raalgons losing it, and without any bloodshed.
24	"Snap! Snap! Crackle! Snap!"; Transliteration: "Pusshin Pusshin Pichipichi Pusshin" (Japanese: プッツン プッツン ピチパチ プッツン)	Hiroyuki Kawasaki	July 5, 1993
Following his success Tylor is made captain of a new ship, the Aso. However, this means nothing to him after he learns that his most important ally, the retired Admiral Hanner, has died.
25	"My Way is the Hard Way"; Transliteration: "Mai Uei ga Setsunakute" (Japanese: マイウェイが切なくて)	Mami Watanabe	July 12, 1993
While the crew of the Soyokaze are meant to be enjoying themselves, they learn that Tylor has gone missing. Yuriko also learns of something which might restart the war between the UPSF and the Raaglons.
26	"For His Was Genius No Rule Could Contain"; Transliteration: "Okite Hiroki Utsu wa Mono" (Japanese: 掟ひろきうつはもの)	Hiroyuki Kawasaki	July 19, 1993
With Tylor gone, the crew of the Soyokaze have gone their separate ways and Yamamoto has been made captain of the most powerful ship in the USPF fleet. However, have they forgot everything that Tylor has taught them?

=== OVA ===
OVAs 1–2, 9 and 10 take place after the events of the TV series. OVAs 3–8 take place concurrently with episodes 9–10 of the TV series and act as side stories focusing on individual crew members that slot in to the final episodes narrative.

No.	Title	Written by	Original release date
1–2	"Tylor's War (Part 1 / Part 2), also known as "An Exceptional Episode""; Transliteration: "Hotori Bocchi no Sensō・Zenpen / Hitori Bocchi no Sensō・Kōhen" (Japanese: ひとりぼっちの戦争・前編 / ひとりぼっちの戦争・後編)	Kei Yamamura (ep.1); Naoto Kimura (ep.2)	October 1, 1994–November 2, 1994
Several months after the events of the series, the UPSF learn that the Raaglons are developing a new type of weapon. Tylor and the crew of the undefeated Soyokaze are called upon to solve the problem.
3	"The Rules of Being 16"; Transliteration: "16-Sai no Hōsoku" (Japanese: 16歳の法則)	Mami Watanabe	September 1, 1995
Azalyn travels to the world of Ashran, which was conquered by her father. There she meets with an old childhood friend, Ruu, who has lost his memory, so she tries to help him remember.
4	"The Samurai's Narrow Escape"; Transliteration: "Samurai Kiki Ippatsu" (Japanese: サムライ危機一髪)	Kei Yamamura	October 1, 1995
Kojiro begins testing a new type of fighter. While testing occurs he runs into trouble when he flies towards a wrecked ship.
5	"The High-Tech Opposition"; Transliteration: "Haiteki no Mukō-Gawa" (Japanese: ハイテクの向こう側)	Kei Yamamura	December 1, 1995
The marines are keen to try out a new weapon but have to pass an exam before they are allowed to use it. Andresen however is concerned due to his knowledge of the designer, which are proved true when the new weapon goes haywire.
6	"White Christmas"; Transliteration: "Howaito Kurisumasu" (Japanese: ホワイトクリスマス)	Kei Yamamura	December 25, 1995
It is Christmas Eve, and Tylor has agreed to meet up with Yuriko. However, on the way to meeting her Tylor keeps getting distracted by a young boy who is following him.
7–8	"If Only The Skies Would Clear (Part 1 / Part 2)"; Transliteration: "Haretaraīne・1 / Haretaraīne・2" (Japanese: 晴れたらいいね・1 / 晴れたらいいね・2)	Naoto Kimura; Naoyuki Yoshinaga	March 1, 1996–April 1, 1996
Yamamoto is made captain of his own ship, but soon finds himself demoted after he gets attacked. Meanwhile Yuriko is kidnapped by Raaglon spies working for Wang, who wants to start the war again.
9–10	"From Here To Eternity (Part 1 / Part 2)"; Transliteration: "Chijō Yori Eien ni Zenpen / Chijō Yori Eien ni Kōhen" (Japanese: 地上より永遠に 前編 / 地上より永遠に 後編)	Naoto Kimura; Naoyuki Yoshinaga	July 1, 1996–August 1, 1996
All the pieces of the puzzle begin to fall into place. It appears that the war is going to restart, but it is all being controlled by a third party behind the scenes. Can Tylor or his former crew mates find the solution in time?
