= Miracle Girls =

Japanese manga series

- English Cover of the first volume of Miracle Girls, featuring Tomomi and Mikage

ミラクル★ガールズ (Mirakuru★Gāruzu)
- Genre: Magical girl
- Manga
- Written by: Nami Akimoto
- Published by: Kodansha
- English publisher: US: Tokyopop
- Magazine: Nakayoshi
- Original run: 6 July 1991 – 6 August 1994
- Volumes: 13
- Anime television series
- Directed by: Takashi Anno (eps. 1-17); Hiroko Tokita (eps. 30-51)
- Produced by: Shinichiro Maeda (NTV); Yuko Sagawa (Asatsu); Ken Yoda (Japan Taps)
- Written by: Hirotoshi Kobayashi (eps. 1-30); Mami Watanabe (eps. 30-51)
- Music by: Michiru Ōshima
- Studio: Japan Taps
- Original network: NTV
- Original run: 8 January 1993 – 24 December 1993
- Episodes: 51

Miracle Girls (Japanese: ミラクル★ガールズ, Hepburn: Mirakuru Gāruzu) is a Japanese manga written and illustrated by Nami Akimoto, with the first volume being released on July 6, 1991. It was Akimoto's third work, and her longest running. It was a commercial hit and would see the creation of 12 more volumes. The manga is about two twins with opposite interests and talents, the athletic tomboy Tomomi and the intellectual girly girl Mikage, who have combined ESP abilities (telepathy and teleportation) when they link their pinky fingers together. Their boyfriends Hideaki and Yuuya feature prominently, as well as their teacher Shinichirou, a paranormal investigator obsessed with the twins' psychic powers.

It falls under the Magical girl genre, and has some comedic elements. It was adapted into an anime series by Japan Taps in 1993, starting in January and finishing in December of that year. Tokyopop licensed the manga for English release in North America in the year 2000.

== Plot ==
Manga Book 1:

Tomomi and Mikage Matsunaga are identical twins with special powers. Together, they are able to teleport and communicate telepathically. The athletically challenged Mikage begs Tomomi to switch identities with her for her school's sports day track meet, where she and Tomomi are teamed with Mikage's arch enemy Yuya Noda, in the relay race. Tomomi, however, finds herself drawn to Yuya. Tomomi's success in the relay causes the captain of the track team, Hideaki Kurashige, to try to recruit Mikage. So, once again, the sisters switch identities. However, the science teacher, Shinichiro Kageura, finds out about their psychic powers, and begins to stalk Tomomi. Sensing that Mikage (who was really Tomomi) has been behaving strangely, Yuya visits them at home.

Anime Episode 1:

Tomomi and Mikage are twin high school girls with powers hidden from everyone but themselves and their boyfriends: They can communicate with each other telepathically, and if they hold hands, they can teleport. Tomomi, the elder twin, is a tomboy with a knack for sports, and Mikage, the younger twin, is a brilliant academic and is in the chemistry club. One day, they receive big news: Mikage's boyfriend, Kurashige, is transferring to England to further his education; in addition, the ESP fanatic Kageura, the chemistry teacher, is getting married. Though she is initially heartbroken, Mikage recovers and wishes Kurashige well. At Kageura's wedding reception, Kurashige gives her a pocketwatch as a going-away gift. Meanwhile, four flowers, two in England outside of a castle and two in Japan outside of the twins' house, suddenly begin to shine and bloom.

== Characters ==
Original Japanese names/Names in Tokyopop's translation

Tomomi Matsunaga (松永 ともみ, Matsunaga Tomomi)/Toni Morgan
Voiced by: Nariko Fujieda
Older twin sister of Mikage, Tomomi is tomboyish, and the more athletic of the two, who once originally attended an all-girls school, but transfers to Mikage's school after she falls in love with Yuya and even eventually begins to get better and is able to communicate telepathically with Mikage, and Yuya to an extent, but is still able to use more powerful abilities when she is in direct contact with her sister.
Mikage Matsunaga (松永 みかげ, Matsunaga Mikage)/Mika Morgan
Voiced by: Noriko Nagai
Younger twin sister of Tomomi by only thirty, Mikage is feminine, and the more intellectual of the two, though she was introduced to readers right after blowing up her chemistry work and is currently in love with Hideaki Kurashige and even eventually begins to get better and is able to communicate telepathically with Tomomi, she is able to use more powerful abilities when she is in direct contact with her sister.
Yūya Noda (野田 侑也, Noda Yūya)/Jackson Neil
Voiced by: Kappei Yamaguchi
Member of the track team, Yuya develops a romantic relationship with Tomomi. Mikage consistently opposes Yuya do to conflicting interests, although not the relationship between him and Tomomi.
Hideaki Kurashige (倉茂 秀明, Kurashige Hideaki)/Chris Kubrick
Voiced by: Kaneto Shiozawa
Member of the chemistry club and the track team, Hideaki is Mikage's romantic interest. He gets kidnapped and taken to Marie's kingdom in an attempt to force him to marry her.
Shinichiro Kageura (影浦進一郎, Kageura Shin'ichirō)
Voiced by: Ken Yamaguchi
A science teacher, Mr. Kageura (also known as Mr. K) is convinced that paranormal abilities exist in the world, and is focused on proving his theories, in order to become famous amongst the scientific community. He has suspicions of Mikage and Tomomi possessing ESP, and will do anything to expose them for a higher status.
Kōhei Yamagishi (山岸 耕平, Yamagishi Kōhei)
Voiced by: Nobuo Tobita
A friend and classmate of Tomomi and Noda, he is a bit overweight. His skin is also a bit darker compared to the rest of the cast. He is always seen in the company of the latter. He's a good friend, always in a good mood, but a bit of a clutz at times. There are multiple episodes that feature him, but only a few that feature him as a main character in that episode (like the twentieth episode in the anime, which focuses on his love for dinosaurs manifesting itself). He has a secret crush on Tomomi, which from time to time, he tries to win her over and away from Noda (seen in the fortieth episode of the anime).
Rumiko Daijōji (大乗寺 留実子, Daijōji Rumiko)
Voiced by: Rei Sakuma
Daijoji is Mikage's rival, due to her jealousy of Mikage's intelligence in classes, compared to her own. She is also jealous of Mikage's beauty, although she believes with simple changes, she is more beautiful than Mikage. She is an only child from a wealthy family.
Marie Milgraine Diamas (マリエ, Marī)
Voiced by: Wakana Yamazaki
The princess of Diamas who is romantically obsessed with Hideaki and winds up being kidnapped together under her kingdom's orders. She grew up unaware that she has a fraternal twin sister named Emma whom her father took right after their birth due to fears that she would be killed so that Marie could be the sole heir to the throne. She has a snobbish and charismatic personality, who often rivaled and bullied Mikage.
Emma Winston (エマ・ウィンストン, Ema Uinsuton)
Voiced by: Okimoto Fumiyo and Yumi Tōma
The long lost sister of Marie who has long been hidden by their father. In episode 50, the Matsunaga twins locate and find her to have been under strict protection. Once reunited with Maria, they are revealed to also have the ESP ability. In contrast to her sister, she has a shy and timid personality after a long period of being isolated from the outside world.
Mr. X (ミスターX, Misutā X)
Voiced by: Norio Wakamoto
A famous paranormal researcher, Mr. X seeks to control paranormal abilities through science. He also wishes to control the kingdom of the Diamas, as to gain more power for himself. To do this, he "allies" himself with Marie, and gives her what she wants, as to further both of their desires.
Masaki Takamura (高村 雅君, Takamura Masaki)/Mason Templar
Voiced by: Ryo Horikawa
A member of an organization of ESP'ers, Mason seeks to bring Mikage and Tomomi to their organization. He sees people with paranormal abilities (such as himself) as superior to those who do not have them. As such, he seeks to take control over parts of the world (almost reflecting what Mewtwo wanted to do in Pokémon: The First Movie).
Risa Sarashina (更科 理沙, Sarashina Risa)
Voiced by: Miki Narahashi
The wife of Kagerua. She doesn't understand his antics, but she still supports him despite that. When he is away for too long in his pursuit of fame by trying to get proof of the girls using their ESP abilities, she leaves him for some time, while still loving him. In the anime, they get married in the first episode.

== Media ==
=== Manga ===
During its original Japanese run, the manga was split in two main parts. The first part is what the anime takes from, but the manga continued on after the anime had finished. This makes the anime an unfinished adaptation of the series it is based upon.

The Miracle Girls manga was licensed for English release by Tokyopop, who released the series from 2000-10-17 until 2003-05-13. It was licensed by Editions Star Comics for Italian released, where it was serialized in Amici. The manga has been released in Spanish by Norma Editorial as Gemelas Milagrosas from December 2004 to June 2006.

=== Anime ===
It was adapted into an anime series by Japan Taps in 1993. It received 51 episodes, starting from January 8, 1993, to Christmas Eve of that year. The anime was dubbed into Italian by DENEB Film where it was broadcast on Canale 5 from March 1996 and on Italia 1. It would be known as È un po' magia per Terry e Maggie when translated into Italian (it means It's a Little Magic for Terry and Maggie when translated into English), and was a success in Italy. In the Philippines, where it was known as Magic Girls, the show was dubbed in Tagalog and broadcast by ABS-CBN. It is also available in Spanish and Korean.

The series uses three pieces of theme music. The opening themes of the whole series are performed by GARDEN, with "KISU no Tochuu de Namida ga" as the opening for episodes 1-29, and "Koi no Mirai" as the opening for episodes 30–51. Dio performs the ending theme for all 51 episodes, "Futari ja Nakya Dame na no". The Italian dub used its own opening theme ("È un po' magia per Terry e Maggie" by Cristina D'Avena).

The first two series of the book were not made into anime by any companies, but it started with the third book of Miracle Girls.

=== Merchandise ===
During the heyday of Miracle Girls, multiple releases of items based on Mikage, Tomomi, and other characters from the anime (as seen by the artwork on the material, although some were based on their manga appearance) were made. The generic pins, rulers, and shirts came out. Artbooks with the art from the show would also come out. There was a mini-fashion set made that is now rare. There were little toys the size and shape of Fisher-Price toys created. A doll line featuring Mikage and Tomomi hit store shelves. And when these would be promoted on TV, there would be a short animated segment from Miracle Girls (the one that started the commercial was new) and voice lines from the voice actors of Mikage and Tomomi (which were also new) would correlate with what was being promoted.

=== Video game ===
A video game adaptation of Miracle Girls was developed by Now Production and released for the Super Famicom by Takara on October 22, 1993. The player can choose to play as either Mikage or Tomomi and use candies as weapons to stun enemies and use them as platforms which the gameplay is similar to Capcom's Little Nemo for the NES, and when the player clears a level, the player challenges the area boss to a mini-game.

Some characters also appeared in the crossover Nakayoshi All-Stars: Mezase Gakuen Idol for the Nintendo DS.

== Reception ==
Adam Arnold of Animefringe praised the manga series, particularly for the detailed an expressive eyes, and the story "light-hearted and fun to read". A writer at The Anime Review said on the anime "Miracle Girls reminds me of plenty of other better shows". On the website MyAnimeList, out of 1.6k rating, the Miracle Girls anime achieved a 7.5 out of 10. A writer at the Video Game Den gave the game adaptation a 3/5 stars, stating "The game doesn't do anything wrong nor spectacular, but I recommend everyone to try it, so long as they can get past the boss battle minigames and the cutscenes".

== Pop culture ==
In the Italian TV show "Questo mondo non mi renderà cattivo" or "This World Can't Tear Me Down" in English, Miracle Girls (alongside Captain Tsubasa and Doraemon) are parodied by one of the businessmen in the show.
