= List of animated feature films of 1992 =

This is a list of animated feature films first released in 1992.

== List ==
Title	Country	Director	Production company	Animation technique	Format	Notes	Release date	Duration
Aladdin	United States	Ron Clements; John Musker	Walt Disney Feature Animation	Traditional	Theatrical		November 25, 1992	90 minutes
Aladdin	United States	Masakazu Higuchi; Chinami Namba	Golden Films (as American Film Investment Corporation); KK C&D Asia (animation production); GoodTimes Home Video (distributor)	Traditional	Direct-to-video		April 27, 1992	48 minutes
Aladdin	United Kingdom	David Thaytes; Timothy Forder (supervising director)	Bevanfield Films; Foxbridge Limited (distributor)	Traditional	Direct-to-video		November 16, 1992	74 minutes
The Appleland Story アップフェルラント物語 (Apfelland Monogatari)	Japan	Kunihiko Yuyama	J.C. Staff; Tokuma Japan Communications (distributor); Tokuma Shoten (distributor)	Traditional	Theatrical		December 12, 1992	90 minutes
Beauty and the Beast	United Kingdom	Timothy Forder (supervising director)	Bevanfield Films; Foxbridge Limited (distributor)	Traditional	Direct-to-video		?	67 minutes
Beauty and the Beast	United States	Masakazu Higuchi; Chinami Namba	Golden Films (as American Film Investment Corporation); KK C&D Asia (animation production); GoodTimes Home Video (distributor)	Traditional	Direct-to-video		May 4, 1992	49 minutes
Bebe's Kids	United States	Bruce W. Smith	Hyperion Pictures; Collingswood O' Hare Entertainment; Character Builders; Wang Film Productions; Paramount Pictures (distributor)	Traditional	Theatrical		July 31, 1992	72 minutes
Beyond the Mind's Eye	United States	Michael Boydstun	Miramar Images Inc.	Computer	Direct-to-video; Art film Compilation film	Second installment in the Mind's Eye film series.	December 23, 1992	50 minutes
Black Lion: Fear the Black Lion! 時元戦国史 黒の獅士 陣内篇 (Jigen Sengokushi Kuro no Shishi: Jinnai-hen)	Japan	Takashi Watanabe	Minamimachi Bugyosho; Tokyo Kids; Dynamic Planning; Nippon Columbia	Traditional	Direct-to-video; OVA		November 21, 1992	30 minutes
Blinky Bill: The Mischievous Koala	Australia	Yoram Gross	Yoram Gross Films Studio	Traditional	Theatrical		September 17, 1992	97 minutes
Boyfriend ボーイフレンド (Bōifurendo)	Japan	Tetsu Dezaki	Magic Bus; TV Tokyo	Traditional	Television film		February 11, 1992	114 minutes
Chibi Maruko-chan: My Favorite Song ちびまる子ちゃん わたしの好きな歌 (Chibi Maruko-chan: Watashi no Suki na Uta)	Japan	Yumiko Suda; Tsutomu Shibayama	Nippon Animation	Traditional	Theatrical		December 19, 1992	93 minutes
Cinderella	United Kingdom	Timothy Forder	Bevanfield Films	Traditional	Direct-to-video		?	48 minutes
Comet in Moominland ムーミン谷の彗星 (Mūmindani no Suisei)	Finland; Japan; Netherlands	Hiroshi Saitô	Telescreen Japan Inc. Telecable Benelux B.V.	Traditional	Theatrical		August 8, 1992	68 minutes
Cool World	United States	Ralph Bakshi	Bakshi Animation; Rough Draft Studios (animation production); Paramount Pictures (distributor)	Traditional/Live action	Theatrical; Live-action animated film		July 10, 1992	102 minutes
Delinquent in Drag おいら女蛮（スケバン） (I'm a Savage (Sukeban))	Japan	Yusaku Saotome	K-Production; Miyuki Production; Sung San Production; Studio Signal; Nippon Columbia; Dynamic Planning	Traditional	Direct-to-video; OVA		August 21, 1992	45 minutes
Domain of Murder ハロー張りネズミ ファイル１７０ 殺意の領分 (Hello Harinezumi: File 170 Satsui no Ryōbun)	Japan	Hiroshi Morioka; Iku Suzuki	Studio Deen	Traditional	Direct-to-video; OVA		September 1, 1992	51 minutes
Doraemon: Nobita and the Kingdom of Clouds ドラえもん のび太と雲の王国 (Doraemon Nobita to Kumo no Ōkoku)	Japan	Tsutomu Shibayama	Asatsu; Shin-Ei Animation; Toho (distributor)	Traditional	Theatrical		March 7, 1992	98 minutes
Download: Devil's Circuit ダウンロード 南無阿弥陀仏は愛の詩 (Download: Namu Amida Butsu wa Ai no Uta)	Japan	Rintaro	Madhouse; NEC Avenue; SOFIX	Traditional	Direct-to-video; OVA		March 18, 1992	47 minutes
Dragon Ball Z: The Return of Cooler ドラゴンボールZ 激突!!100億パワーの戦士たち (Doragon Bōru Zetto Gekitotsu!! Hyaku-Oku Pawā no Senshi-tachi)	Japan	Daisuke Nisho	Toei Animation	Traditional	Theatrical		March 7, 1992	62 minutes
Dragon Ball Z: Super Android 13! ドラゴンボールZ 極限バトル! 三大超サイヤ人 (Doragon Bōru Zetto Kyokugen Batoru! San Dai Sūpā Saiyajin)	Japan	Kazuhito Kikuchi	Toei Animation	Traditional	Theatrical		July 11, 1992	46 minutes
The Elephant Train Has Arrived ぞう列車がやってきた (Zō Ressha ga Yatte Kita)	Japan	Mei Kato	Mushi Production	Traditional	Theatrical		July 4, 1992	80 minutes
Evil Toons	United States	Fred Olen Ray	American Independent Productions; Curb/Esquire Films; Prism Entertainment Corporation (distributor)	Traditional/Live action	Direct-to-video; Live-action animated film		January 8, 1992	90 minutes
Fatal Fury: Legend of the Hungry Wolf バトルファイターズ 餓狼伝説 (Batoru Faitāzu Garō Densetsu)	Japan	Hiroshi Fukutomi	NAS; Studio Comet; Fuji TV	Traditional	Television special	First television special based on a video game overall.	December 23, 1992	45 minutes
FernGully: The Last Rainforest	Australia; United States	Bill Kroyer	Kroyer Films; A. Film A/S; FAI Films; 20th Century Fox (distributor)	Traditional	Theatrical		April 10, 1992	76 minutes
Freddie as F.R.O.7	United Kingdom	Jon Acevski	Hollywood Road Films; J&M Entertainment (distributor)	Traditional	Theatrical		August 14, 1992	91 minutes
Fūma no Kojirō Saishushou: Fuma Hanran-hen 風魔の小次郎 最終章 風魔反乱篇 (Kojiro of the Fuma Clan - The Final Chapter: Fuma Rebellion Chapter)	Japan	Hidehito Ueda	AIC; Animate Film; MOVIC; J.C. Staff	Traditional	Direct-to-video; OVA	Standalone special installment spun off from the OVA series that ran from June 1, 1989 to December 1, 1990 for twelve 25−30 minute episodes; based on the manga of the same title written and illustrated by Masami Kurumada.	November 21, 1992	50 minutes
Gin no Otoko 銀の男 (The Silver Man)	Japan	Kōichi Ishiguro	J.C. Staff; Visual '80 (animation production cooperation)	Traditional	Direct-to-video; OVA		January 10, 1992	49 minutes
Hanappe Bazooka 花平バズーカ (Hanappe Bazuuka)	Japan	Takahiro Ikegami	Studio Signal; Nippon Crown	Traditional	Direct-to-video; OVA		September 4, 1992	46 minutes
Hay Bin Yeksan	Turkey; Arabia	Haşim Vatandaş	Elif Video; Redoks Multimedya	Traditional	Television film	Based on the novel Ḥayy ibn Yaqẓān (around 1160 CE (555 AH)), by Ibn Tufail.	?	78 minutes
Hōkago no Tinker Bell 放課後のティンカー・ベル (After School Tinker Bell)	Japan	Yasushi Murayama	Production Reed	Traditional	Direct-to-video; OVA		July 22, 1992	46 minutes
Iron Virgin Jun 鉄の処女JUN (Tetsu no Shojo JUN)	Japan	Fumio Maezono	Dynamic Planning; Nippon Columbia; Animaruya; Triangle Staff	Traditional	Direct-to-video; OVA		July 21, 1992	46 minutes
Joker - Marginal City; JOKER マージナル・シティ	Japan	Osamu Yamasaki	E&G Films; Studio Sign; Happinet Pictures	Traditional	Direct-to-video; OVA		April 21, 1992	45 minutes
The Jungle Book	United Kingdom	Timothy Forder	Bevanfield Films	Traditional	Direct-to-video		May 1, 1992	41 minutes
Kamasutra: The Ultimate Sex Adventure 究極のSEXアドベンチャー カーマスートラ (Kyūkyoku no Sekkusu Adobenchā Kāmasūtora)	Japan	Masayuki Ozeki	Animate; E&G Films; Toho Video (distributor)	Traditional	Direct-to-video; OVA		April 24, 1992	43 minutes
Kkulbeorui chingu 꿀벌의 친구 (A Friend of Bees)	South Korea	Kim Seong-chil	MBC Production	Traditional	Television film		February 4, 1992	84 minutes
Legend of the Galactic Heroes: Golden Wings 銀河英雄伝説外伝 黄金の翼 (Ginga Eiyū Densetsu: Ōgon no Tsubasa)	Japan	Keizou Shimizu	Magic Bus	Traditional	Direct-to-video		December 12, 1992	60 minutes
The Legend of the North Wind; La leyenda del viento del Norte	Spain	Carlos Varela; Maite Ruiz de Austri	Euskal Pictures International (EPISA); Eskuz Animation Studios; Euskal Irrati Telebista (EiTB); Euskal Media	Traditional	Theatrical			74 minutes
The Little Ghost; Das Kleine Gespenst	Germany	Curt Linda	Linda Film; Filmwelt Verleihagentur (distributor)	Traditional	Theatrical	Based on the 1966 book of the same title by Otfried Preußler; later re-adapted in 2013.	October 29, 1992	86 minutes
The Little Punker; Der kleene Punker	Germany	Michael Schaack	Trickcompany	Traditional	Theatrical		October 29, 1992	74 minutes
Lupin III: From Russia with Love ルパン三世『ロシアより愛をこめて』 (Rupan Sansei: Russia yori Ai o Komete)	Japan	Osamu Dezaki	Tokyo Movie Shinsha; Nippon TV (distributor)	Traditional	Television special		July 24, 1992	90 minutes
The Magic Voyage; Die Abenteuer von Pico und Columbus (The Adventures of Pico and Columbus)	Germany	Michael Schoemann	MS-Films; Bavaria Film; Zweites Deutsches Fernsehen (ZDF); Allied Filmmakers (distributor)	Traditional	Theatrical		February 14, 1992	82 minutes
Magical Taruruto-kun: Good Good Hot Grilled Octopus! まじかる☆タルるートくん すきすきタコ焼きっ! (Majikaru Tarurūto-kun: Suki Suki Hot Tako Yaki)	Japan	Yukio Kaizawa	Toei Animation	Traditional	Theatrical		March 7, 1992	45 minutes
Midori 地下幻燈劇画 少女椿 (Chika Gentō Gekiga: Shōjo Tsubaki)	Japan	Hiroshi Harada	?	Traditional	Theatrical	In 1999, parts of the film were stolen and destroyed.	May 2, 1992	52 minutes
Mikeneko Holmes: The Lord of Ghost Castle 三毛猫ホームズの幽霊城主 (Mikeneko Holmes no Yurei Joshu)	Japan	Nobuyuki Kitajima	AIC	Traditional	Direct-to-video; OVA		July 21, 1992	45 minutes
Mitki-Mayer; Митьки никого не хотят победить или Митькимайер (Mitki nikovo ne khotyat pobedit ili Mitkimayer)	Russia	A. Vassilyev	Trinity Bridge Studio	Traditional	Theatrical	First Russian animated feature after the breakup of the Soviet Union.	?	54 minutes
Mobile Suit Gundam 0083: The Last Blitz of Zeon 機動戦士ガンダム0083 －ジオンの残光－ (Kidō Senshi Gandamu Daburuōeitīsurī - Jion no Zankō - )	Japan	Takashi Imanishi	Sunrise	Traditional	Theatrical; Compilation film	Compilation film of the thirteen-part OVA series that ran from May 23, 1991 to September 24, 1992.	August 29, 1992	120 minutes
The New Adventures of Little Toot	United States; Canada	Pierre DeCelles	Bardel Entertainment (pre-production art services); Pacific Rim Productions (animation services); Pixibox; Tundra Entertainment	Traditional	Direct-to-video		October 8, 1992	45 minutes
The New Adventures of Robin Hood	Australia		Burbank Animation Studios	Traditional	Television film		?	48 minutes
The New Adventures of William Tell	Australia	Douglas Richards	Burbank Animation Studios	Traditional	Direct-to-video		?	50 minutes
Oh, Guys, Ta-ra-ra; Ой, ребята, та-ра-ра (Oy, rebyata, ta-ra-ra)	Russia	Leonid Nosyrev	Soyuzmultfilm	Cutout	Compilation film		?	52 minutes
Oishinbo: Kyūkyoku Tai Shikō, Chōju Ryōri Taiketsu!! 美味しんぼ 究極対至高 長寿料理対決!! (The Gourmet: Ultimate vs. Supreme, Longevity Cuisine Showdown!!)	Japan	Iku Suzuki; Yoshio Takeuchi	Shin-Ei Animation; Studio Deen (cooperation); Nippon TV (distributor)	Traditional	Television film		December 11, 1992	90 minutes
Patchin shite! Obaa-chan パッチンして！おばあちゃん (Snap It! Grandma)	Japan	Shinichi Tsuji	Gaga Communications	Traditional	Theatrical		March 10, 1992	90 minutes
The Pied Piper of Hamlin	Australia		Burbank Animation Studios	Traditional	Direct-to-video		?	50 minutes
Pinocchio	United States	Diane Eskenazi	Golden Films (as American Film Investment Corporation); KK C&D Asia (animation production); GoodTimes Home Video (distributor)	Traditional	Direct-to-video		May 11, 1992	49 minutes
Porco Rosso 紅の豚 (Kurenai no Buta)	Japan	Hayao Miyazaki	Studio Ghibli; Toho (distributor)	Traditional	Theatrical		July 18, 1992	94 minutes
Ramayana: The Legend of Prince Rama	India; Japan	Yugo Sako; Ram Mohan		Traditional	Theatrical	First Indian animated feature.	May 10, 1992	135 minutes
Raven Tengu Kabuto: The Golden-Eyed Beast 鴉天狗カブト 黄金の目のケモノ (Karasu Tengu Kabuto: Ôgon no me no Kemono)	Japan	Buichi Terasawa	A-Girl; Hero Communications; KSS; NHK Enterprises; Nakamura Production	Traditional	Direct-to-video; OVA		July 24, 1992	45 minutes
Run Melos! 走れメロス! (Hashire Merosu!)	Japan	Masaaki Osumi	Toei Company (distributor); Visual 80	Traditional	Theatrical	Remake of the 1981 film, based on the same source material.	July 25, 1992	107 minutes
Sangokushi (dai 1-bu): Eiyū-tachi no Yoake 三国志（第１部）英雄たちの夜明け (Romance of the Three Kingdoms (Part 1): The Heroes of the Dawn)	Japan	Tomoharu Katsumata	Toei Animation; Enoki Films	Traditional	Theatrical	Part one of a three-part animated film series based on the Chinese novel Romance of the Three Kingdoms.	January 25, 1992	138 minutes
Seikima II: Humane Society -Jinruiai ni Michita Shakai- 聖飢魔II HUMANE SOCIETY 〜人類愛に満ちた社会〜 (Seikima-II: Humane Society - A Society for the Love of Mankind))	Japan	Jun Kamiya	Animate; I.G Tatsunoko; Movic; Sony Music Entertainment (distributor)	Traditional	Direct-to-video; OVA		July 1, 1992	57 minutes
Senbon Matsubara: Kawa to Ikiru Shōnen-tachi せんぼんまつばら 川と生きる少年たち (One Thousand Pine Groves: The Boys Who Lived with the River)	Japan	Tetsu Dezaki	Mushi Production; Magic Bus	Traditional	Theatrical		July 11, 1992	93 minutes
Sequence Ｓｅｑｕｅｎｃｅ シークエンス	Japan	Naohito Takahashi	Ashi Productions; Youmex	Traditional	Direct-to-video; OVA		March 18, 1992	42 minutes
Shin Dosei Jidai: Hawaiian Breeze 新・同棲時代 HAWAIIAN BREEZE (New Cohabitation Era: Hawaiian Breeze)	Japan	Hiroshi Fukutomi	Animaruya; Japan Home Video (distributor)	Traditional	Direct-to-video; OVA		July 3, 1992	41 minutes
Shiritsu Tantei Toki Shozo no Trouble Note - Hard & Loose 私立探偵・土岐正造 トラブル・ノート ハード＆ルーズ (Private Detective Shozo Toki's Trouble Note - Hard & Loose)	Japan	Noboru Ishiguro	Artland; Nippon Animation; Nippon Columbia (distributor)	Traditional	Direct-to-video; OVA		July 1, 1992	46 minutes
Sho Is Flying in the Sky 翔ちゃん空をとぶ (Shō-chan Sora wo Tobu)	Japan	Takuo Suzuki	Central Promotion; Piano Music Studio; Peter Brothers; Noah Arts Club; Humax Pictures (distributor)	Traditional	Theatrical		November 14, 1992	63 minutes
Silent Möbius 2 サイレントメビウス2 (Sairento Mebiusu 2)	Japan	Yasunori Ide	JVC; Kadokawa Shoten; Pioneer LDC; AIC; Shochiku (distributor)	Traditional	Theatrical	Sequel to Silent Möbius: The Motion Picture (1991).	July 18, 1992	54 minutes
Sinbad	United States	Masakazu Higuchi; Chinami Namba	Golden Films (as American Film Investment Corporation); KK C&D Asia (animation production); GoodTimes Home Video (distributor)	Traditional	Direct-to-video		May 18, 1992	50 minutes
Soreike! Anpanman Tsumiki-jō no Himitsu それいけ! アンパンマン つみき城のひみつ (Let's Go! Anpanman: The Secret of Building Block Castle)	Japan	Akinori Nagaoka	Tokyo Movie Shinsha	Traditional	Theatrical		March 14, 1992	60 minutes
Spirit of Wonder: Miss China's Ring ザスピリットオブワンダー - チャイナさんの憂鬱 (Supirit ou Wandā: Chaina-san no Yūutsu)	Japan	Mitsuru Hongo	Toshiba EMI (distributor); Ajia-do Animation Works	Traditional	Direct-to-video; OVA		June 3, 1992	42 minutes
The Three Musketeers	United States	Diane Eskenazi	Golden Films (as American Film Investment Corporation); KK C&D Asia (animation production); GoodTimes Home Video (distributor)	Traditional	Direct-to-video		June 1, 1992	50 minutes
Thumbelina	United States	Masakazu Higuchi; Chinami Namba	Golden Films (as American Film Investment Corporation); KK C&D Asia (animation production); GoodTimes Home Video (distributor)	Traditional	Direct-to-video		June 8, 1992	49 minutes
Tiny Toon Adventures: How I Spent My Vacation	United States	Barry Caldwell; Art Leonardi; Byron Vaughns; Ken Boyer; Alfred Gimeno; Kent Butterworth; Rich Arons	Warner Bros. Animation; Amblin Entertainment	Traditional	Direct-to-video		March 11, 1992	79 minutes
Tom and Jerry: The Movie	United States	Phil Roman	Film Roman; Turner Pictures; WMG	Traditional	Theatrical		October 1, 1992 (Germany); July 30, 1993 (United States)	84 minutes
Tomcat's Big Adventure ちびねこトムの大冒険 地球を救え！なかまたち (Chibineko Tom no Daibōken - Chikyū o Sukue! Nakama-tachi)	Japan	Ryutaro Nakamura	Triangle Staff; Iwasaki Shoten; Shochiku (distributor)	Traditional	Theatrical		?	81 minutes
Tottoi トトイ	Japan	Kiyozumi Norifumi	Nippon Animation	Traditional	Theatrical		August 22, 1992	80 minutes
The Tune	United States	Bill Plympton	October Films	Traditional	Theatrical	First film directed by Bill Plympton.	April 25, 1992	69 minutes
The Weathering Continent 風の大陸 (Kaze no Tairiku)	Japan	Kōichi Mashimo	Production I.G.	Traditional	Theatrical		July 18, 1992	54 minutes
Yawara! Go Get 'Em, Wimpy Kids!! YAWARA！ それゆけ腰ぬけキッズ！！ (Yawara! Soreyuke Koshinuke Kizzu!!)	Japan	Hiroko Tokita	Kitty Films; Madhouse; YTV (distributor)	Traditional	Theatrical		August 1, 1992	60 minutes
Zetsuai 1989 絶愛-1989- (Absolute Love -1989-)	Japan	Takuji Endo	Madhouse; Shueisha	Traditional	Direct-to-video; OVA		July 29, 1992	45 minutes

== Highest-grossing animated films of the year ==
Rank	Title	Studio	Worldwide gross	Ref.
1	Aladdin	Walt Disney Feature Animation	$504,050,219	
2	Porco Rosso	Studio Ghibli	$34,000,000 (¥2.8 billion)	
3	FernGully: The Last Rainforest	Kroyer Films / A. Film A/S / 20th Century Fox	$32,710,894	
4	Doraemon: Nobita and the Kingdom of Clouds	Asatsu / Toho	$14,091,840 (¥1.68 billion)	
5	Dragon Ball Z 6: Return of Cooler	Toei Animation	$13,420,800 (¥1.6 billion)	
6	Bebe's Kids	Paramount / Hyperion Pictures	$8,442,162	
7	Tom and Jerry: The Movie	Turner Entertainment / Miramax	$3,560,469	

== See also ==
- List of animated television series of 1992
