= 1992 in animation =

1992 in animation is an overview of notable events, including notable awards, list of films released, television show debuts and endings, and notable deaths.

== Events ==
=== January ===
- January 27: During a rally of the Republican Party, President George H. W. Bush states that "the American Family (...) needs to be a lot more like The Waltons and a lot less like The Simpsons."
- January 30: At the start of the next The Simpsons episode, a short video is shown in which the Simpson family watches Bush's speech on television. In response to it, Bart Simpson says: "Hey, we're just like the Waltons: we pray for an end to the depression too".

=== February ===
- February 24: Tiny Toon Adventures concludes its second season in Syndication with the episode "Take Elmyra Please".

=== March ===
- March 7: The first episode of Sailor Moon airs in Japan.
- March 11: Tiny Toon Adventures: How I Spent My Vacation releases on VHS & LaserDisc.
- March 30: 64th Academy Awards:
  - Beauty and the Beast becomes the first animated feature film to be nominated for the Academy Award for Best Picture during the 64th Academy Awards. It loses to The Silence of the Lambs, but wins the Academy Award for Best Original Score and the Academy Award for Best Original Song.
  - Manipulation by Daniel Greaves wins the Academy Award for Best Animated Short Film.
  - Ray Harryhausen wins the Gordon E. Sawyer Award (also known as the Lifetime Achievement Academy Award).

=== April ===
- April 10: Bill Kroyer's FernGully: The Last Rainforest premieres. This film received positive attention and was given a direct-to-video sequel 5 years later.
- April 20: The first episode of Goof Troop airs.
- April 27: Golden Films's Aladdin is released. Disney, who would release its own Aladdin theatrical film, sued GoodTimes Home Video for copyright infringement before dismissing the suit on the grounds that Aladdin is a public domain work, which differs from the then-upcoming Disney film.

=== June ===
- June 26: Erotic anime series La Blue Girl airs in Japan. This anime received serious censorship when it was released outside its Japanese home country and its classification was refused in the United Kingdom for its pornographic exploits of underage women.

=== July ===
- July 10: Ralph Bakshi's Cool World, which mixes live-action with animation, premieres, but flops at the box office.
- July 18: Hayao Miyazaki's Porco Rosso premieres.
- July 25: NBC cancels its Saturday morning lineup due to low ratings from the mandated Children's Television Act as several programs, including Space Cats, Super Mario World, and ProStars, have met social issues and intolerance. It was soon replaced by TNBC following the success of Saved By the Bell.
- July 31: Bruce W. Smith's Bebe's Kids is first released.

=== August ===
- August 14: Ben Kingsley's Freddie as F.R.O.7 premieres. It flopped at the box office. The film was originally going to be rated G, but the rating was changed to PG by the MPAA after reviewing the film's sensitive depictions of Ku Klux Klan and Nazi-based antagonists and sexual innuendo. It was re-released by MCA/Universal Home Video under the title Freddie the Frog three years later, with several of its inappropriate fragments removed or changed.
- August 15: The Ren & Stimpy Show episode "Powdered Toast Man" premieres, guest starring Frank Zappa as the Pope.
- August 20: Friz Freleng receives a star at the Hollywood Walk of Fame.
- August 27: The Simpsons concludes its third season on Fox with the episode "Brother, Can You Spare Two Dimes?".

=== September ===
- September 4: Bill Plympton's The Tune premieres.
- September 5: The first episode of Batman: The Animated Series premieres on Fox Kids.
- September 7: The Batman: The Animated Series episode "Heart of Ice" premieres, the episode is acclaimed for reinventing Mr. Freeze into a tragic villain.
- September 11:
  - The Batman: The Animated Series episode "Joker's Favor" premieres, in which Harley Quinn makes her debut. She will become so popular that she will be added to the regular cast of the Batman franchise.
  - The first episode of The Little Mermaid premieres on CBS.
- September 12:
  - The first episode of Eek! The Cat airs.
  - The first episode of Fievel's American Tails premieres on CBS, the first cartoon series based on one of Don Bluth's franchises and the continuation of An American Tail: Fievel Goes West. It was stored away over five years after the initial broadcast until NBCUniversal recovered it in 2020.
- September 13: Season 2 of Rugrats begins on Nickelodeon with the premiere of the episodes "Chuckie vs. the Potty/Together at Last".
- September 14: The third & final season of Tiny Toon Adventures begins on Fox Kids with the premiere of the episode "Thirteen Something".
- September 17: The first episode of Noddy's Toyland Adventures airs.
- September 19: Season 5 of Garfield and Friends begins on CBS with the premiere of the following episodes:
  - "Home Away from Home/Rainy Day Robot/Odie the Amazing"
  - "The First Annual Garfield Watchers Test/Stark Raven Mad/The Record Breaker"
- September 21: The Ren & Stimpy Show creator John Kricfalusi is fired by Nickelodeon due to him failing to meet production deadlines. This leads to him and his animation studio, Spümcø, being replaced by Nickelodeon's own animation studio, Games Animation Inc., for the remainder of the series.
- September 22: The animated short Frog Baseball first airs on television. It marks the debut of Beavis and Butt-Head, who will receive their own series a year later.
- September 24: Season 4 of The Simpsons begins on Fox with the premiere of the episode "Kamp Krusty".
- September 25: The first episode of Tenchi Muyo! Ryo-Ohki is released.

=== October ===
- October 1:
  - Cartoon Network is launched in the United States by Turner Broadcasting System.
  - The film Tom and Jerry: The Movie premieres in Germany, which marks the first full-length film featuring Tom and Jerry. It became a box office bomb when it premiered in the US the following year and still remains unfavorable decades later.
- October 14:
  - A Bunch of Munsch makes its official premiere on Showtime in the US with the episode "The Paper Bag Princess" for the Showtime's Fall 1992 lineup opposite during the "Family Hour" block of children's program. based on Robert Munsch's 1980 classic children's book.
  - The first episode of American Heroes & Legends airs.
- October 29:
  - The Little Punker premieres.
  - The Simpsons' "Treehouse of Horror III" premieres on Fox.
- October 31: The first episode of X-Men: The Animated Series airs.
- Specific date unknown in October: The animated advertisement for Super Mario Land 2: 6 Golden Coins featuring Mario's nemesis Wario airs during commercial breaks, which will later become an Internet meme.

=== November ===
- November 7: Garfield and Friends concludes its fifth season on CBS with the following episodes:
  - "Ghost of a Chance/Roy Gets Sacked/Revenge of the Living Lunch!"
  - "Super Sonic Seymour/A Mildly Mental Mix-Up/The Garfield Rap"
- November 25: Aladdin by Ron Clements and John Musker, produced by the Walt Disney Company, premieres.
- November 27: The Peanuts Holiday special It's Christmastime Again, Charlie Brown premieres on CBS. This was the final Peanuts TV special to premiere on CBS, as ABC would later air new specials & re-runs of older ones, but NBC would air one Peanuts special two years later before ABC ended up taking over.

=== December ===
- December 6: Tiny Toon Adventures' final episode "It's a Wonderful Tiny Toons Christmas Special" premieres on Fox Kids.
- December 7: Chuck Jones' Bugs Bunny cartoon What's Opera, Doc? is added to the National Film Registry.
- December 8: Trey Parker and Matt Stone make the animated short Jesus vs. Frosty, which features embryonal versions of the characters that will later appear in South Park.

=== Specific date unknown ===
- Film Roman takes over production of The Simpsons from Klasky Csupo.
- Jan Švankmajer's Food is first released.
- The Spanish film The Legend of the North Wind premieres.
- The first episode of Cococinel airs.

== Films released ==
- January 8 - Evil Toons (United States)
- January 25 - Sangokushi (dai 1-bu): Eiyū-tachi no Yoake (Japan)
- February 4 - Kkulbeorui chingu (South Korea)
- February 11 - Boyfriend (Japan)
- February 14 - The Magic Voyage (Germany)
- March 7:
  - Doraemon: Nobita and the Kingdom of Clouds (Japan)
  - Dragon Ball Z: The Return of Cooler (Japan)
  - Magical Taruruto: Good Good Hot Grilled Octopus! (Japan)
- March 11 - Tiny Toon Adventures: How I Spent My Vacation (United States)
- March 14 - Soreike! Anpanman Tsumiki-jō no Himitsu (Japan)
- April 10 - FernGully: The Last Rainforest (United States and Australia)
- April 21 - Joker - Marginal City (Japan)
- April 25 - The Tune (United States)
- April 27 - Aladdin (United States)
- May 1 - The Jungle Book (United Kingdom)
- May 2 - Midori (Japan)
- May 4 - Beauty and the Beast (United States)
- May 10 - Ramayana: The Legend of Prince Rama (India and Japan)
- May 11 - Pinocchio (United States)
- May 18 - Sinbad (United States)
- June 1 - The Three Musketeers (United States)
- June 3 - Spirit of Wonder: Miss China's Ring (Japan)
- June 8 - Thumbelina (United States)
- July 1:
  - Seikima II: Humane Society -Jinruiai ni Michita Shakai- (Japan)
  - Shiritsu Tantei Toki Shozo no Trouble Note - Hard & Loose (Japan)
- July 4 - The Elephant Train Has Arrived (Japan)
- July 10 - Cool World (United States)
- July 11:
  - Dragon Ball Z: Super Android 13! (Japan)
  - Senbon Matsubara: Kawa to Ikiru Shōnen-tachi (Japan)
- July 18:
  - Porco Rosso (Japan)
  - Silent Möbius 2 (Japan)
  - The Weathering Continent (Japan)
- July 21:
  - Iron Virgin Jun (Japan)
  - Mikeneko Holmes: The Lord of Ghost Castle (Japan)
- July 22 - Hōkago no Tinker Bell (Japan)
- July 24:
  - Lupin III: From Russia with Love (Japan)
  - Raven Tengu Kabuto: The Golden-Eyed Beast (Japan)
- July 25 - Run Melos! (Japan)
- July 31 - Bebe's Kids (United States)
- August 1 - Yawara! Go Get 'Em, Wimpy Kids!! (Japan)
- August 8 - Comet in Moominland (Japan)
- August 14 - Freddie as F.R.O.7 (United Kingdom)
- August 21 - Delinquent in Drag (Japan)
- August 22 - Tottoi (Japan)
- August 29 - Mobile Suit Gundam 0083: The Last Blitz of Zeon (Japan)
- September 17 - Blinky Bill: The Mischievous Koala (Australia)
- October 1 - Tom and Jerry: The Movie (Germany)
- October 8 - The New Adventures of Little Toot (United States and Canada)
- October 29 - The Little Punker (Germany)
- November 16 - Aladdin (United Kingdom)
- November 21 - Fūma no Kojirō Saishushou: Fuma Hanran-hen (Japan)
- November 25 - Aladdin (United States)
- December 11 - Oishinbo: Kyūkyoku Tai Shikō, Chōju Ryōri Taiketsu!! (Japan)
- December 12:
  - The Appleland Story (Japan)
  - Legend of the Galactic Heroes: Golden Wings (Japan)
- December 19 - Chibi Maruko-chan: My Favorite Song (Japan)
- December 23:
  - Beyond the Mind's Eye (United States)
  - Fatal Fury: Legend of the Hungry Wolf (Japan)
- Specific date unknown:
  - Beauty and the Beast (United Kingdom)
  - Cinderella (United Kingdom)
  - The Legend of the North Wind (Spain)
  - Mitki-Mayer (Russia)
  - The New Adventures of Robin Hood (Australia)
  - The New Adventures of William Tell (Australia)
  - The Pied Piper of Hamlin (Australia)
  - Tomcat's Big Adventure (Japan)

== Television series debuts ==
Date	Title	Channel	Year
January 31	Capitol Critters	ABC	1992
February 28	Fish Police	CBS	1992
April 18	Delfy and His Friends	TVE1	1992
August 2	My Little Pony Tales	The Disney Channel	1992
September 5	Batman: The Animated Series	Fox Kids	1992–1995
September 5	Goof Troop	The Disney Channel, Syndication, ABC	1992
September 8	Saban's Gulliver's Travels	Syndication	1992–1993
September 11	The Little Mermaid	CBS	1992–1994
September 12	Fievel's American Tails	CBS	1992
September 12	The Addams Family (1992)	ABC	1992–1993
September 12	Wild West C.O.W.-Boys of Moo Mesa	ABC	1992–1993
September 12	Eek! The Cat	Fox Kids	1992–1997
September 12	Super Dave: Daredevil for Hire	Fox Kids	1992–1993
September 13	King Arthur and the Knights of Justice	Syndication	1992–1993
September 13	Conan the Adventurer (1992)	Syndication	1992–1993
September 19	Raw Toonage	CBS	1992
September 19	The Plucky Duck Show	Fox Kids	1992
September 26	Dog City	Fox Kids	1992–1994
September 28	Stunt Dawgs	Syndication	1992–1993
October 2	ToonHeads	Cartoon Network	1992–2003
October 14	American Heroes & Legends	Showtime	1992–1993
October 31	X-Men	Fox Kids	1992–1997
November 2	Mickey's Mouse Tracks	The Disney Channel	1992–1995
November 5	Junglies	TV-am	1992–1993
November 13	Saban's Around the World in Eighty Dreams	Syndication	1992–1993

== Television series endings ==
Date	Title	Channel	Year	Notes
January 20	G.I. Joe: A Real American Hero (1989)	Syndication	1989–1992	Cancelled
March 2	James Bond Jr.	Syndication	1991–1992	Cancelled
March 13	Fish Police	CBS	1992	Cancelled
March 14	Capitol Critters	ABC	1992	Cancelled
November 2	Donald Duck Presents	The Disney Channel	1983–1992	Ended
November 28	Good Morning, Mickey!	The Disney Channel	1983–1992	Ended
November 30	Young Robin Hood	Syndication	1991–1992	Cancelled
December 2	A Bunch of Munsch	CTV, Showtime	1991–1992	Cancelled
December 5	Fievel's American Tails	CBS	1992	Cancelled
December 5	Raw Toonage	CBS	1992	Cancelled
December 5	Goof Troop	The Disney Channel, Syndication, ABC	1992	Cancelled
December 6	Tiny Toon Adventures	Syndication	1990–1992	Cancelled
December 12	The Plucky Duck Show	Fox Kids	1992	Cancelled
December 12	Darkwing Duck	The Disney Channel, Syndication, ABC	1991–1992	Cancelled
December 19	Widget	Syndication	1990–1992	Cancelled
December 25	My Little Pony Tales	The Disney Channel	1992	Cancelled
December 26	Back to the Future	CBS	1991–1992	Cancelled
Unknown	Mother Goose and Grimm	CBS	1991–1992	Cancelled
Unknown	Camp Candy	NBC, Syndication	1989–1992	Cancelled

== Births ==
=== January ===
- January 19: Logan Lerman, American actor (voice of Robert Conroy in Sgt. Stubby: An American Hero).

=== February ===
- February 10: Karen Fukuhara, American actress (voice of the title character in Kipo and the Age of Wonderbeasts, Glimmer in She-Ra and the Princesses of Power, Sewer Queen and Alexis in Craig of the Creek).
- February 14: Freddie Highmore, English actor (voice of Astro Boy in Astro Boy, Justin in Justin and the Knights of Valour).
- February 16: Jimmy Tatro, American actor, comedian, writer and YouTube personality (voice of Thorp in Smallfoot, Mitch in Fast & Furious Spy Racers, Leaf (Bucky) in The Mighty Ones, Lights Out McGinty in Rumble, Bill Walter in Diary of a Wimpy Kid: Rodrick Rules).
- February 18: Logan Miller, American actor (voice of Nova in Ultimate Spider-Man and Guardians of the Galaxy, Johnny in Phineas and Ferb).
- February 25: Rose Matafeo, New Zealand comedian, actress and TV presenter (voice of Loto in Moana 2).

=== March ===
- March 3: Nick Dahan, American television writer and production assistant (The Simpsons).
- March 13: Megan Shipman, American voice actress (voice of Anya Forger in Spy x Family).
- March 27: Aoi Yūki, Japanese actress (voice of Madoka Kamane in Puella Magi Madoka Magica, Hibiki Tachibana in Symphogear, Iris in Pokémon, Tsuyu Asui / Froppy in My Hero Academia, Nodoka Hanadera / Cure Grace in Healin' Good Pretty Cure, Futaba Sakura in Persona 5: The Animation, Japanese dub voice of Sticks in Sonic Boom and Gwen Stacy / Spider-Woman in Spider-Man: Into the Spider-Verse).

=== April ===
- April 8: Shelby Young, American voice actress (voice of Princess Leia Organa in the Star Wars franchise, Rayna in Baby Shark's Big Show!, Toda-Joh in Star Wars: Young Jedi Adventures, The Magician in Ladybug & Cat Noir: The Movie, Captain Bragg and Bayrn in Star Wars: The Bad Batch, Diplo Ship in Elio).
- April 18: Chloe Bennet, American actress and singer (voice of Chase in Tinker Bell and the Legend of the NeverBeast, Daisy Johnson / Quake in Marvel Rising, Yi in Abominable and Abominable and the Invisible City, Shelby in Rally Road Racers).
- April 24: Jack Quaid, American actor (voice of Brad Boimler in Star Trek: Lower Decks, Richie Rich in seasons 3-4 of Harvey Girls Forever!, Superman in My Adventures with Superman, Alberto Falcone in Batman: The Long Halloween, Earth-65 Peter Parker / Lizard in Spider-Man: Across the Spider-Verse, Tanner in the Solar Opposites episode "The Rad Awesome Terrific Ray").
- April 27: Morgan Berry, American actress (voice of Rindo Kobayashi in Food Wars!: Shokugeki no Soma, Thirteen in My Hero Academia, Daymond in The Seven Deadly Sins, Sharley in One Piece, Vivica in the Miraculous: Tales of Ladybug & Cat Noir episode "Desperada").

=== May ===
- May 17: Jules Medcraft, American actress (voice of Adam in Bigfoot Family, Andrea Davenport in The Ghost and Molly McGee).
- May 18: Spencer Breslin, American actor and musician (voice of Crandall in Teamo Supremo, Cubby in Return to Never Land, Anthony in Quantum Quest: A Cassini Space Odyssey).
- May 21: Olivia Olson, American singer and actress (voice of Vanessa Doofenshmirtz in Phineas and Ferb, Marceline in Adventure Time, Bliss in The Powerpuff Girls).
- May 29: Erica Lindbeck, American actress (voice of Jane Foster in Avengers Assemble, Emira Blight in The Owl House, Cheetara and Wilykit in ThunderCats Roar, Mera in DC Super Hero Girls, Loona and Millie in Helluva Boss, Kaori Miyazono in Your Lie in April, Natalie Miller / Glitter Ace in Glitter Force Doki Doki, Futaba Sakura in Persona 5: The Animation, voice of Barbie from 2015 to 2017).

=== June ===
- June 14:
  - Daryl Sabara, American actor (voice of Rex Salazar in Generator Rex, Hunter in Father of the Pride, Hero Boy in The Polar Express, Heatblast in Ben 10, Rhino in Ultimate Spider-Man).
  - Eve Sabara, American actress (voice of Robin in The Batman, additional voices in Home on the Range, Dinosaur, and My Neighbor Totoro).
- June 18: Sean Teale, English actor (voice of King Alfor in Voltron: Legendary Defender).
- June 28: Konomi Kohara, Japanese actress and voice actress (voice of Akane Mizuno in Tsuki ga Kirei, Yuko Yoshida in The Demon Girl Next Door, Lala Hagoromo/Cure Milky in Star Twinkle PreCure, Mina Hibino in Teasing Master Takagi-san, Kasumi Nomura in Asobi Asobase, Chika Fujiwara in Kaguya-sama: Love Is War, Roxy Migurdia in Mushoku Tensei).

=== July ===
- July 5: Kyler Spears, American animator (Lucas Bros. Moving Co., Axe Cop), storyboard artist (Clarence, We Bare Bears), writer (We Bare Bears) and director (Amphibia).
- July 10: Kelley Mack, American actress (provided additional voices for Spider-Man: Into the Spider-Verse), (d. 2025).
- July 17: Harrison Chad, American actor (voice of Boots in seasons 1-4 of Dora the Explorer and the Go, Diego, Go! episode "Linda the Llama Saves Carnaval", Cardigan in Charlotte's Web 2: Wilbur's Great Adventure, young Tarzan in Tarzan II, singing voice of Leo in Little Einsteins).
- July 22: Selena Gomez, American singer and actress (voice of Princess Selenia in Arthur and the Revenge of Maltazard and Arthur 3: The War of the Two Worlds, Helga McDodd in Horton Hears a Who!, Mavis Dracula in the Hotel Transylvania franchise).

=== August ===
- August 4:
  - Dylan Sprouse, American actor (voice of KB Toys Soldier in Eight Crazy Nights, Justin Magoo in Kung-Fu Magoo, Zam in The Emperor's New School episode "Chipmunky Business").
  - Cole Sprouse, American actor and photographer (voice of KB Toys Soldier in Eight Crazy Nights, Brad Landry in Kung-Fu Magoo, Zim in The Emperor's New School episode "Chipmunky Business").
- August 6: Saori Ōnishi, Japanese voice actress (voice of Hisako Arato in Food Wars!: Shokugeki no Soma, Eriri Spencer Sawamura in Saekano: How to Raise a Boring Girlfriend, Ais Wallenstein in Is It Wrong to Try to Pick Up Girls in a Dungeon?, Saphentite Neikes in Monster Girl Doctor, Shikimori in Shikimori's Not Just a Cutie).
- August 13: Erika Henningsen, American actress and singer (voice of Charlie Morningstar in Hazbin Hotel, Ania in Curses!).
- August 17: Saraya Bevis, British pro wrestler (voiced herself in Scooby-Doo! and WWE: Curse of the Speed Demon and Surf's Up 2: WaveMania).
- August 20: Demi Lovato, American singer, songwriter, and actress (voice of Smurfette in Smurfs: The Lost Village, Lenore Quinonez in Charming).
- August 21: RJ Mitte, American actor (voice of Walter White Jr. in the Robot Chicken, episode "Food"), (d. 2026).
- August 31: Talon Warburton, American actor (voice of Lord Nighty-Knight in Megamind Rules!, Young Talon in DreamWorks Dragons: Rescue Riders).

=== September ===
- September 8: Domee Shi, Canadian animator, film director and screenwriter (Pixar).
- September 18: Marissa Lenti, American voice actor (voice of Yuna in Kuma Kuma Kuma Bear, Shoko Majima in Kokkoku, Alicia Florence in Aria the Animation, Chiaki Hoshinomori in Gamers!, Gangle in The Amazing Digital Circus).
- September 27: Sam Lerner, American actor (voice of Zak Saturday in The Secret Saturdays, Chowder in Monster House, King Gristle in Trolls: The Beat Goes On!).
- September 30: Ezra Miller, American actor (voice of D.A. Sinclair in the Invincible episode "You Look Kinda Dead").

=== October ===
- October 9: Tyler James Williams, American actor (voice of Bobby in Little Bill, Firestorm in Batman: The Brave and the Bold).
- October 12: Josh Hutcherson, American actor and producer (voice of Markl in Howl's Moving Castle, Nod in Epic, Van-El and young Bruce Wayne in the Justice League Unlimited episode "For the Man Who Has Everything").
- October 13: Aaron Dismuke, American actor (voice of Alphonse Eric in Fullmetal Alchemist, Senku Ishigami in Dr. Stone, Tamaki Amajiki / Suneater in My Hero Academia, Shura in YuYu Hakusho, Hibiki in Fairy Tail, Sante in Tokyo Ghoul, Kanji Ike in Classroom of the Elite, Kakeru Manabe in Fruits Basket, Miyuki Shirogane in Kaguya-sama: Love Is War, Oscar Pine in RWBY).
- October 15: Vincent Martella, American actor (voice of Phineas Flynn in Phineas and Ferb and the Milo Murphy's Law episode "The Phineas and Ferb Effect", Jason Todd in Batman: Under the Red Hood and Batman: Death in the Family).
- October 28: Vivienne Medrano, Salvadoran-American animator (creator of Hazbin Hotel and Helluva Boss).

=== November ===
- November 2: Lizzie Freeman, American voice actress (voice of Sempai in Magical Sempai, Trish Una in JoJo's Bizarre Adventure: Golden Wind, Chizuru Mizuhara in Rent-A-Girlfriend, Pomni in The Amazing Digital Circus).
- November 18: Nathan Kress, American actor (voice of Wedge Antilles in Star Wars Rebels, Ronald in The Penguins of Madagascar episode "Field Tripped").
- November 23: Miley Cyrus, American singer, songwriter, and actress (voice of Penny in Bolt, Yatta in The Emperor's New School, Celebrity Starr in The Replacements episode "The Frog Prince", Skateboarding Pigeon in the Stone Quackers episode "A Farewell to Kings").
- November 25: Zack Shada, American actor (voice of Comet in Space Chimps and Space Chimps 2: Zartog Strikes Back, Pen in the Random! Cartoons episode "Adventure Time", Aqualad in the Batman: The Brave and the Bold episode "Sidekicks Assemble!", young Scott Free in the Justice League Unlimited episode "The Ties That Bind").
- November 28:
  - Cameron Ansell, Canadian actor (voice of Morris in Max & Ruby, Meteor in Bigfoot Presents: Meteor and the Mighty Monster Trucks, Spinner in Miss Spider's Sunny Patch Friends, Arthur Read in Arthur from 2004 to 2007).
  - Kianna Underwood, American actress (voice of Fuchsia Glover in Little Bill), (d. 2026).

=== December ===
- December 14: Tori Kelly, American actress, singer and songwriter (voice of Meena in the Sing franchise, Cynthia in the Rugrats episode "Rescuing Cynthia").
- December 18: Bridgit Mendler, American actress and singer-songwriter (voice of Arietty in The Secret World of Arietty).

== Deaths ==
=== January ===
- January 9: Claude Coats, American painter and animator (Walt Disney Animation Studios, Hanna-Barbera, UPA), dies at age 78.
- January 10: Babette DeCastro, American singer (Bird and Animal voices in Song of the South), dies at age 66.
- January 15: Walter Clinton, American animator and comics artist (Tex Avery, Hanna-Barbera), dies at age 85.
- January 24: Ken Darby, American composer and conductor (Walt Disney Animation Studios), dies at age 82.

=== February ===
- February 4: John Dehner, American animator (Walt Disney Studios, Hanna-Barbera, UPA) and actor, dies at age 76.
- February 9: Jack Kinney, American animator, animation director and producer (Walt Disney Company, Kinney-Adelquist Productions, Hanna-Barbera, UPA), dies at age 82.
- February 14: Alex Lovy, American animator, director and comics artist (Van Beuren, Walter Lantz, Columbia Pictures, Hanna-Barbera), dies at age 78.
- February 20: Dick York, American actor (voice of Darrin Stephens in The Flintstones episode "Samantha"), dies at age 63.

=== March ===
- March 4: Art Babbitt, American animator (creator of Goofy, worked for Terrytoons, Walt Disney Company, Hanna-Barbera, and UPA), dies at age 84.
- March 6: Elvia Allman, American actress (voice of Miss Cud in I Haven't Got a Hat, second voice of Clarabelle Cow), dies at age 87.
- March 13: Boris Dyozhkin, Russian film director, caricaturist and animator (Cipollino, Fitil), dies at age 77.
- March 14: Ralph James, American voice actor (voice of narrator in The Unmentionables, Mr. Turtle for Tootsie Pops, Orson in Mork & Mindy/Laverne & Shirley/Fonz Hour, additional voices in Dynomutt, Dog Wonder, Captain Caveman and the Teen Angels, and The Plastic Man Comedy/Adventure Show), dies at age 67.
- March 17: Grace Stafford, American actress (voice of Woody Woodpecker from 1950 to 1991) and wife of Walter Lantz, dies of spinal cancer at age 88.
- March 24: Campbell Grant, American actor (voice of Angus MacBadger in The Adventures of Ichabod and Mr. Toad), character designer and animation writer (Fantasia), dies at age 82.
- March 29: William L. Hendricks, American producer (Looney Tunes), dies at age 87.

=== April ===
- April 16: Andy Russell, American-Mexican singer and actor (sang the segment "Without You" in Make Mine Music), dies at age 72.

=== May ===
- May 5: Michael J. O'Connor, American animator, storyboard artist (Filmation, Hanna-Barbera, The Simpsons) and writer (DePatie-Freleng Enterprises, Filmation), dies at age 54.
- May 25: Edith Vernick, Ukrainian-American animator, supervised the assistant animation department for both the Fleischer Studios and the Metro-Goldwyn-Mayer cartoon studio (Gulliver's Travels, The Cat Concerto), dies at age 86.
- May 27: John Myhers, American actor (voice of Hector Heathcote), dies at age 70.

=== June ===
- June 3: Robert Morley, English actor (Narrator in The Dot and the Line: A Romance in Lower Mathematics, voice of the Sultan in Hugo the Hippo), dies at age 84.
- June 15: Chuck Menville, American animator and writer (Hanna-Barbera, Tiny Toon Adventures, Batman: The Animated Series), dies at age 52.

=== July ===
- July 17: Larry Roberts, American actor (voice of Tramp in Lady and the Tramp), dies at age 65 from AIDS.
- July 18: Rudolf Ising, American animator, film director and producer (co-founder of Warner Bros. Cartoons and the Metro-Goldwyn-Mayer cartoon studio, Looney Tunes, Merrie Melodies, Happy Harmonies) and actor (original voice of Barney Bear), dies at age 88.

=== August ===
- August 8: Lynn Karp, American animator and comics artist (Walt Disney Company), dies at age 82.
- August 23: Charles August Nichols, American animator and film and television director (Walt Disney Company, Hanna-Barbera), dies at age 81.
- August 26: Sammy Timberg, American musician and composer (Fleischer Studios, Famous Studios), dies at age 89.
- August 27: Ferdinand Diehl, German animator and film director (The Seven Ravens, Mecki), dies at age 91.

=== September ===
- September 5: Yasuji Mori, Japanese animator (Toei Animation) and director (The Little Prince and the Eight-Headed Dragon), dies at age 67.
- September 25: Leslie Denison, English actor (voice of the judge and a weasel in The Adventures of Ichabod and Mr. Toad, narrator in Donald's Diary), dies at age 87.
- September 27: Zhang Leping, Chinese comics artist and animator (Sanmao), dies at age 91.
- September 29: John Reed, American animator, special effects artist, and animation director (Fantasia, Bambi, Animal Farm), dies at age 84.

=== October ===
- October 6: Denholm Elliott, English actor (voice of Cowslip in Watership Down), dies at age 70.
- October 16: Shirley Booth, American actress (voice of Mrs. Claus in The Year Without a Santa Claus), dies at age 94.
- October 18: Purv Pullen, American actor (Silly Symphonies, Birds in Snow White and the Seven Dwarfs), dies at age 83.
- October 20: Jackson Weaver, American broadcaster and actor (voice of Smokey Bear), dies at age 72.
- October 25: Roger Miller, American singer and actor (voice of Alan-a-Dale the rooster in Robin Hood), dies at age 56.

=== November ===
- November 22: Sterling Holloway, American actor (voice of Stork in Dumbo, adult Flower in Bambi, Cheshire Cat in Alice in Wonderland, the title character in the Disney's Winnie the Pooh franchise, Kaa in The Jungle Book, Roquefort in The Aristocats), dies at age 87.

=== December ===
- December 10: Joan Gardner, American actress (voice of Spunky in The Adventures of Spunky and Tadpole, Mrs. Wetworth in Snorks), dies at age 66.
- December 17: Horst von Möllendorff, German comics artist, cartoonist and animator (Verwitterte Melodie, Der Schneemann, Wedding in the Coral Sea), dies at age 86.
- December 24: Peyo, Belgian comics artist and film director (The Smurfs and the Magic Flute), dies at age 64.
- December 30: Romeo Muller, American screenwriter (Rankin/Bass), dies at age 64.
- December 31: Dianne Jackson, English film director (The Snowman), dies at age 51.

=== Specific date unknown ===
- Fred Abranz, American comics artist and animator (Walt Disney Company), dies at age 81 or 82.
- Wan Chaochen, Chinese film director and producer (Wan Brothers), dies at age 85 or 86.
- Pierre Chivot, French animator and comics artist, dies at age 63 or 64.

== See also ==
- 1992 in anime
