= 1992 in anime =

The events of 1992 in anime.

== Releases ==
=== Film ===
A list of anime that debuted in theaters between January 1 and December 31, 1992.

Released	Title	Director	Studio	Runtime	Demographic	Genre(s)	Ref
January 25	Sangokushi (dai 1-bu): Eiyū-tachi no Yoake (Romance of the Three Kingdoms (Part 1): The Heroes of the Dawn)	Tomoharu Katsumata	Enoki Films	138 min			
March 7	Doraemon Nobita to Kumo no Ōkoku (Doraemon: Nobita and the Kingdom of Clouds)	Tsutomu Shibayama	Shin-Ei Animation	98 min			
March 7	Doragon Bōru Zetto Gekitotsu!! Hyaku-Oku Pawā no Senshi-tachi (Dragon Ball Z: The Return of Cooler)	Daisuke Nisho	Toei Animation	60 min	Shōnen	martial arts; fighting; sci-fi; action	
March 7	Majikaru Tarurūto-kun: Suki Suki Hot Tako Yaki (Magical Taruruto: Good Good Hot Grilled Octopus!)	Yukio Kaizawa	Toei Animation	45 min			
March 14	Soreike! Anpanman Tsumiki-jō no Himitsu (Let's Go! Anpanman: The Secret of Building Block Castle)	Akinori Nagaoka	Tokyo Movie Shinsha	60 min			
April 25	Candy Candy	Tetsuo Imazawa	Toei Animation	26 min	Shōjo	drama; slice-of-life	
May 2	Midori (Chika Gentō Gekiga: Shōjo Tsubaki)	Hiroshi Harada	Mippei Eiga Kiryūkan	107 min		drama; horror	
June 25	Hashire Merosu! (Run Melos!)	Masaaki Osumi	Visual 80	107 min		action; classical age	
July 4	Zō Ressha ga Yatte Kita (The Elephant Train Has Arrived)	Mei Kato	Mushi Production	80 min			
July 11	Doragon Bōru Zetto Kyokugen Batoru! San Dai Sūpā Saiyajin (Dragon Ball Z: Super Android 13!)	Kazuhito Kikuchi	Toei Animation	46 min	Shōnen	martial arts; fighting; sci-fi; action	
July 11	Doragon Kuesuto: Dai no Daibōken Buchiyabure!! Shinsei Roku Daishōgun (Dragon Quest: The Adventure of Dai – Six Great Generals)	Nobutaka Nishizawa	Toei Animation	40 min	Shōnen	action-adventure; fantasy	
July 11	Rokudenashi Blues	Takao Yoshisawa	Toei Animation	30 min	Shōnen	combat sports; school drama	
July 11	Senbon Matsubara: Kawa to Ikiru Shōnen-tachi (One Thousand Pine Groves: The Boys Who Lived with the River)	Tetsu Dezaki	Mushi Production; Magic Bus	93 min			
July 18	Porco Rosso (Kurenai no Buta)	Hayao Miyazaki	Studio Ghibli	94 min			
July 18	Sairento Mebiusu 2 (Silent Möbius 2)	Yasunori Ide	AIC	59 min	Shōnen	sci-fi; supernatural; adventure	
July 18	Kaze no Tairiku (The Weathering Continent)	Kōichi Mashimo	I.G. Tatsunoko	54 min		fantasy; supernatural; action-adventure	
August 1	Ranma ½: Kessen Tougenkyou! Hanayome wo Torimodose! (Ranma ½: Nihao, My Concubine)	Akira Suzuki	Studio Deen	65 min	Shōnen	adventure; comedy; magical sex shift	
August 1	Yawara! Soreyuke Koshinuke Kizzu!! (Yawara!: Go Get 'Em, Wimpy Kids!!)	Hiroko Tokita	Madhouse	60 min		combat sport; martial arts; slice-of-life	
August 22	Tottoi	Kiyozumi Norifumi	Nippon Animation	80 min			
August 29	Mobile Suit Gundam 0083: The Last Blitz of Zeon	Takashi Imanishi	Sunrise	119 min		sci-fi; action; mecha	
November 11	Shō-chan Sora wo Tobu (Sho Is Flying in the Sky)	Takuo Suzuki	Piano Music Studio; Peter Brothers; Noah Arts Club	63 min			
December 12	Ginga Eiyū Densetsu: Ōgon no Tsubasa (Legend of the Galactic Heroes: Golden Wings)	Keizou Shimizu	Magic Bus	59 min		sci-fi; action; mecha	
December 12	Apfelland Monogatari (The Appleland Story)	Kunihiko Yuyama	J.C.Staff	90 min		drama; adventure	
December 19	Chibi Maruko-chan: Watashi no Suki na Uta (Chibi Maruko-chan: My Favorite Song)	Yumiko Suda, Tsutomu Shibayama	Nippon Animation	93 min	Shōjo	drama; slice-of-life; music	

=== TV series ===
A list of anime television series that debuted between January 1 and December 31, 1992.

Released	Completed	Title	Episodes	Director	Studio	Demographic	Genre(s)	Ref
January 10	December 25	Mama wa Shōgaku 4 Nensei	51	Shūji Iuchi	Sunrise Studios	Shoujo	sci-fi, parental care	
January 12	December 20	Bush Baby, Little Angel of the Grasslands	40	Takayoshi Suzuki	Nippon Animation		Adventure, Drama	
March 7	February 27, 1993	Sailor Moon	46	Junichi Sato	Toei Animation	Shoujo	sci-fi; romance	
April 1	February 24, 1993	Genki Bakuhatsu Ganbaruger	47	Toshifumi Kawase	Sunrise	Shōnen	sci-fi; action; mecha	
April 3	March 27, 1993	Salad Juu Yuushi Tomatoman	50		TV Tokyo		comedy; adventure	
April 13	–	Crayon Shin-chan	–	Mitsuru Hongo	Shin-Ei Animation	Seinen	comedy; slice-of-life	
April 14	April 24, 1993	Ashita e Free Kick	52	Tetsuro Amino	Production Reed		sports; drama	
April 23	October 1	Aah! Harimanada	23	Yukio Okazaki	TV Tokyo	Seinen	sports; drama	
August 24	July 16, 1993	Yadamon	170	Masuji Harada Takashi Yui	Group TAC		fantasy; adventure	
October 2	December 3, 1993	Hime-chan no Ribbon	61	Hatsuki Tsuji	Studio Gallop; NAS	Shoujo	fantasy; romance; magic girl	
October 4	December 25, 1994	Tsuyoshi Shikkari Shinasai	112	Shin Misawa	Studio Comet	Seinen	comedy; romance; slice-of-life	
October 10	January 7, 1995	Yu Yu Hakusho	112	Noriyuki Abe	Fuji TV		adventure; martial arts; supernatural	
October 15	September 30, 1993	Kaze no Naka no Shoujo: Kinpatsu no Jeanie	52	Ryō Yasumura	Nippon Animation		drama	
October 16	June 18, 1993	Mikan Enikki	30	Noboru Ishiguro	Nippon Animation		comedy; slice-of-life; pet	

=== OVA releases ===
A list of original video animations that debuted between January 1 and December 31, 1992.

Released	Completed	Title	Episodes	Director	Studio	Ref
January 21		Handsome Girl*	1	Shunji Ooga	J.C.Staff	
March 27	August 28	Video Girl Ai	6	Mizuho Nishikubo	I.G. Tatsunoko	
April 21		Joker - Marginal City	1	Osamu Yamasaki	E&G Films; Studio Sign	
April 22	Apr 28, 1993	Sousei Kishi Gaiarth	3	Shinji Aramaki	AIC; Studio Kyuuma	
April 24		Kamasutra: The Ultimate Sex Adventure	1	Masayuki Ozeki	E&G Films	
May 2	Nov 21, 1993	K.O. Century Beast Warriors	7	Hiroshi Negishi	Gainax; Animate Film	
May 21	November 21	Macross II: Lovers Again	6	Kenichi Yatagai	AIC	
June 3		Spirit of Wonder: Miss China's Ring	1	Mitsuru Hongo	Ajia-do Animation Works	
July 1		Seikima II: Humane Society -Jinruiai ni Michita Shakai-	1	Jun Kamiya	I.G Tatsunoko	
July 1		Shiritsu Tantei Toki Shozo no Trouble Note - Hard & Loose	1	Noboru Ishiguro	Nippon Animation	
July 21		Iron Virgin Jun	1	Fumio Maezono	Triangle Staff	
July 21		Mikeneko Holmes: The Lord of Ghost Castle	1	Nobuyuki Kitajima	AIC	
July 22	Jan 25, 1998	Giant Robo	7	Yasuhiro Imagawa	Mu Animation Studio	
July 22		Hōkago no Tinker Bell	1	Yasushi Murayama	Production Reed	
July 24		Karasu Tengu Kabuto: Ôgon no me no Kemono	1	Buichi Terasawa	Nakamura Production	
August 5	Mar 10, 1993	Nozomi Witches	3	Gisaburō Sugii	Group TAC	
August 21		Oira Sukeban	1	Yūsaku Saotome	Studio Signal Club	
August 25	Jun 25, 1993	Bastard!! Ankoku no Hakaishin	6	Katsuhito Akiyama	AIC	
September 1		Hello Harinezumi: Satsui no Ryoubun	1	Iku Suzuki	Studio Deen	
September 4		Hanappe Bazooka	1	Takahiro Ikegami	Studio Signal	
September 21	Oct 1, 1993	Ushio to Tora	10	Kunihiko Yuyama	Pastel	
September 25	Mar 25, 1993	Tenchi Muyo! Ryo-Ohki	6	Hiroki Hayashi	AIC	
October 21	Mar 21, 1994	Tokyo Babylon	2	Koichi Chigira	Madhouse	
October 21	May 25, 1994	All Purpose Cultural Cat Girl Nuku Nuku	6	Yoshio Ishiwata	Animate Film	
October 23	Sep 23, 1993	Gensou Jotan Ellcia	4	Yoriyasu Kogawa	J.C.Staff	
November 21		Black Lion	1	Takashi Watanabe	Tokyo Kids; Minami Machi Bugyousho	
November 21		Fūma no Kojirō Saishushou: Fuma Hanran-hen	1	Hidehito Ueda	AIC; J.C. Staff	
November 25	Mar 25, 1993	Green Legend Ran	3	Satoshi Saga	AIC	
December 16	Jul 21, 1993	Ys: Tenkuu no Shinden - Adol Christine no Bouken	4	Takashi Watanabe	Tokyo Kids	
December 16		New Dream Hunter Rem: Setsuriku no Mudenmekyu	1	Seiji Okuda	Studio Zain	
December 18		Download: Namu Amida Butsu wa Ai no Uta	1	Rintaro	Madhouse	
December 21	Feb 25, 1993	Eien no Filena	6	Yoshikata Nitta	Pierrot	

* Initially premiered Sept 29, 1991; VHS released January 1992

== See also ==
- 1992 in animation
