= Sterling Entertainment Group =

American entertainment company (1984–2006)

- Formerly: United American Video Corporation (1984–1986); United American Video (1986–1991); UAV Corporation (1991–1999); UAV Entertainment (1993–1997)
- Type: Incentive
- Industry: Entertainment
- Founded: 1984; United States
- Defunct: 2006
- Fate: Bankruptcy
- Headquarters: United States
- Number of locations: New York, New York (1992–1993); Charlotte, North Carolina (1993–1996); Fort Mill, South Carolina (1996–2006); VidAmerica; New York, New York (1992–1993); UAV Corporation; Nashville, Tennessee (1984–1986); Charlotte, North Carolina (1986–1996); Fort Mill, South Carolina (1996–1999)
- Total assets: $200 million

Sterling Entertainment Group (formerly United American Video (or in short: UAV) Corporation, and more commonly known as UAV Home Video or UAV Entertainment) was an American independent entertainment company founded in 1984 as a small local company originally located in Nashville, Tennessee, then, from late 1986, Charlotte, North Carolina. Its headquarters would later relocate to Fort Mill, South Carolina in 1996. UAV was the longtime competitor of GoodTimes Entertainment, Anchor Bay Entertainment and Celebrity Home Video and many other sell-through discount home entertainment companies.

== History ==
United American Video began in 1984, by "The Pettus Family" with four employees, 50 public domain titles and 200 professional grade VHS and Betamax recorders. The founders changed the name a few years later to UAV Corporation to better reflect its entry into the prerecorded music and PC software businesses. In 1991, it entered into an agreement with Viacom Enterprises to license titles of The Andy Griffith Show onto videocassette. The company had operated different sublabels like Gemstone Entertainment, Hep Cat Entertainment and Ovation Home Video to release videocassette titles and Karaoke Bay to release record label titles.

In 1992, UAV acquired 150 titles from the defunct VidAmerica, which was eventually rebranded as Sterling Entertainment Group, and later began releasing a line of MTM Enterprises titles through the MTM Home Video label. Sterling will be located on the old VidAmerica headquarters. In 1993, UAV created a video gift pack that was designed specifically for all holiday stores under the Video Gift Pak brand line. In 1996, UAV relocated from Charlotte to Fort Mill, South Carolina, into a custom built 100,000 square feet headquarters housing manufacturing, distribution and all sales and marketing functions. In 1994, the company began to produce several original titles that were made for videocassette, which included a line of fitness videos starring Kathy Ireland, as well as a line of children's animation videos. Also that year, UAV invested into their own CD-ROM technology and four new animated titles were introduced at the Summer Consumer Electronics Show. In late 1998, UAV rebranded its home entertainment division under the Sterling Entertainment Group name, although UAV was continued to be used as a legal name for the company. In 1999, UAV added 210,000 additional square feet to its headquarters with over 250 associates. In 2002, UAV was sold to a private equity firm.

On June 14, 2006, the private equity firm lost control of the company to the lenders and UAV filed, laying off over 300 employees, claiming payroll funding had been cut by its lenders. A week later, the total number of layoffs had increased by approximately 100 extra. On June 30, ContentFilm announced its intent to acquire Allumination Filmworks as well as certain assets from UAV Corporation and UAV Holdings. The acquisition was completed that September. In 2017, Content Media Corporation was acquired by Kew Media Group, which was later liquidated and collapsed in 2020, and the Kew Media Distribution library was later acquired by the Quiver Entertainment division of Quiver Distribution in the same year. Quiver is the current rights holder for most of UAV's original productions, while properties licensed by UAV are now owned by other distributors.

== Products ==
Most of the products produced by Sterling Entertainment Group were VHS and DVD releases of films, cartoons and TV series that are now in the public domain, original productions and exclusive licenses, as well as a full line of music and computer software.

Under their UAV Gold banner, Sterling (which was known as UAV at the time) also distributed original production animated fairy tale and classic literature adaptations, acting as mockbusters often released around the time of more popular and widely known theatrical releases by Disney and other major studios. This attempt was not used by other generic companies due to their tendencies against plagiarism (owing to GoodTimes Entertainment being sued by Disney after releasing their version of Aladdin). Notable releases included The Secret of the Hunchback, The Secret of Anastasia, Young Pocahontas, The Secret of Mulan, Moses: Egypt's Great Prince, and The Adventures of Tarzan. Sterling also released a non-mockbuster animated film The Night Before Christmas in Cartoontown during that same period.

UAV also had the exclusive licenses for the entire MTM Enterprises library which included The Mary Tyler Moore Show, Hill Street Blues and The White Shadow. They also distributed many public domain episodes of TV series, including The Beverly Hillbillies, The Dick Van Dyke Show, The Andy Griffith Show and The Lucy Show. Sterling also released VHS tapes and DVDs of DIC Entertainment shows beginning in 2003.

== See also ==
- Public domain
- Entertainment companies of the United States
