= List of animated television series of 1992 =

This is a list of animated television series first aired in 1992.

Animated television series first aired in 1992
Title	Seasons	Episodes	Country	Year	Original Channel	Technique
The Addams Family (1992)	2	21	United States	1992–93	ABC	Traditional
The Adventures of T-Rex	1	52	United States; Japan; France	1992	Syndication	Traditional
American Heroes & Legends	1	11	United States	1992–93	Showtime	Traditional
Astro Farm	5	53	United Kingdom	1992–96	ITV	Stop motion
The Authentic Adventures of Professor Thompson	1	26	Spain	1992–94	TVE	Traditional
Batman: The Animated Series	2	85	United States	1992–95	Fox Kids	Traditional
The Bear's Island	1	26	France	1992	Antenna 2	Traditional
Les Bêtises: Toutes les Chansons en Dessins Animés	1	13	France	1992	Canal J	Traditional
Black Cat Detective	1	12	China	1992	CCTV	Traditional
Capitol Critters	1	13	United States	1992–96	ABC (1992); Cartoon Network (1995–96)	Traditional
The Cobi Troupe	1	26	Spain	1992	FORTA	Traditional
Cococinel	2	78	France; Belgium	1992–96	TF1	Traditional
Conan the Adventurer	2	65	United States; Canada; France	1992–93	Syndication; M6	Traditional
Delfy and His Friends	1	91	Spain; Italy; France	1992	TVE	Traditional
Dick Bruna's Miffy Storybook Classics	1	52	Netherlands; United Kingdom; Czechoslovakia	1992–94		Traditional
Dog City	3	31	United States; Canada	1992–94	Fox Kids; Global Television Network; YTV	Traditional
Donald's Quack Attack	1	95	United States	1992–2003	The Disney Channel	Traditional
Eek! The Cat	5	75	United States; Canada	1992–97	Fox Kids Network; YTV	Traditional
Fiddley Foodle Bird	1	13	United Kingdom	1992	BBC1	Traditional
Fievel's American Tails	1	13	United States; Canada	1992	CBS	Traditional
Fish Police	1	6	United States	1992	CBS	Traditional
For Better or for Worse	1	6	Canada	1992	HBO; The Disney Channel	Traditional
Funnybones	1	12	United Kingdom	1992	BBC One; BBC Two	Traditional
The Gingerbread Man	1	13	United Kingdom	1992	ITV	Stop motion
Goof Troop	2	79	United States	1992	Syndication (season 1); ABC (season 2)	Traditional
Guano!	1	50	France	1992	Canal+	Traditional
Hairy Jeremy	1	12	United Kingdom; France	1992	CBBC; France 3	Stop motion
Joshua Jones	1	12	United Kingdom	1992	BBC One; Channel 5	Stop motion
Junglies	1	13	United Kingdom	1992–93	TV-am	Traditional
Juniper Jungle	1	13	United Kingdom	1992–93	BBC	Traditional
The Ketchup Vampires	2	26	Germany	1992–94	ZDF	Traditional
King Arthur and the Knights of Justice	2	26	United States; Canada; France	1992–93	Syndication	Traditional
The Legend of White Fang	1	26	Canada; France	1992–94	Family Channel; Global; TF1	Traditional
The Little Mermaid	3	31	United States	1992–94	CBS	Traditional
The Little Polar Bear	1	26	Germany; United Kingdom	1992–95	BBC One; Das Erste	Traditional
A Maravilhosa Expedição às Ilhas Encantadas	2	100	Portugal	1992	RTP2	Traditional
Mickey's Mouse Tracks	1	78	United States	1992–95	Disney Channel	Traditional
Les Misérables	1	26	France	1992–93	TF1	Traditional
My Little Pony Tales	1	26	United States	1992	The Disney Channel	Traditional
Noddy's Toyland Adventures	4	53	United Kingdom	1992–2000	BBC1 and BBC2	Stop motion
Omer and the Starchild	1	26	France	1992	Canal+	Traditional
Penking and Linking	2	26	South Korea	1992–94	MBC TV	Traditional
The Plucky Duck Show	1	13	United States	1992	Fox Kids Network	Traditional
Puppydog Tales	1	13	United Kingdom	1992	BBC	Cut-Outs
Raw Toonage	1	12	United States	1992	CBS	Traditional
Saban's Around the World in Eighty Dreams	1	26	France	1992–93	Canal+ TF1	Traditional
Saban's Gulliver's Travels	1	26	France	1992–93	France 2 Canal+	Traditional
Sauerkraut	1	13	Germany	1992–93	ZDF	Traditional
Shakespeare: The Animated Tales	2	12	United Kingdom; Russia	1992–94	BBC2	Traditional stop motion paint-on-glass
Shelley Duvall's Bedtime Stories	2	12	United States	1992–93	Showtime	Traditional, Live-action
The Specialists	1	10	United States	1992	MTV	Traditional
Stunt Dawgs	1	40	United States; Canada	1992–93	Syndication	Traditional
Super Dave: Daredevil for Hire	1	13	United States; Italy	1992–93	Fox Kids Network	Traditional
Tales of a Wise King	1	26	Israel	1992–93	Channel 1	Stop motion
ToonHeads	8	102	United States	1992–2003	Cartoon Network	Traditional
Touli le gardien des rêves	1	101	France	1992	Canal+	Stop motion
Truckers	1	13	United Kingdom	1992	ITV	Stop motion
Twinkle, the Dream Being	1	26	South Korea; United States	1992–93	Syndication, MBC	Traditional
Les Volbecs	2	26	France, Switerland	1992–93	France 3	
Wild West C.O.W.-Boys of Moo Mesa	2	26	United States	1992–93	ABC	Traditional
The World of Peter Rabbit and Friends	1	9	United Kingdom	1992–98	BBC1 (1992–96); BBC Two (1998)	Traditional
X-Men: The Animated Series	5	76	United States; Canada	1992–97	Fox Kids Network	Traditional
Zoo Olympics	1	52	France	1992	Canal+	Traditional

Anime television series first aired in 1992

Title	Episodes	Country	Year	Original Channel
Aah! Harimanada	23	Japan	1992	TXN
The Adventures of T-Rex	52	Japan; United States	1992–93	Syndication
The Brave Fighter of Legend Da-Garn	46	Japan	1992–93	ANN
The Bush Baby	40	Japan	1992	FNS
Calimero (1992)	52	Japan	1992–93	ANN
Cooking Papa	151	Japan	1992–95	
Crayon Shin-chan	1167+	Japan	1992–present	
Flower Witch Mary Bell	50	Japan	1992–93	
Genki Bakuhatsu Ganbaruger	47	Japan	1992–93	
Hime-chan's Ribbon	61	Japan	1992–93	
Jeanie with the Light Brown Hair	52	Japan	1992–93	
Kobo, the Li'l Rascal	63	Japan	1992–94	
Mama wa Shōgaku 4 Nensei	51	Japan	1992	
Mikan Enikki	31	Japan	1992–93	
My Patrasche	26	Japan	1992–93	
Nangoku Shōnen Papuwa-kun	42	Japan	1992–93	
Nontan to Issho	265	Japan	1992–94	
Oi! Ryoma	39	Japan	1992–93	NHK
Sailor Moon	46	Japan	1992–93	ANN
Shōnen Ashibe 2	25	Japan	1992–93	
Super Bikkuriman	44	Japan	1992–93	
Tekkaman Blade	49	Japan	1992–93	
Tetsujin 28 FX	47	Japan	1992–93	
Thumbelina: A Magical Story	26	Japan	1992–93	
The Wonderful Galaxy of Oz	26	Japan	1992–93	
Yadamon	170	Japan	1992–93	
YuYu Hakusho	112	Japan	1992–95	

== See also ==
- List of animated feature films of 1992
- List of Japanese animation television series of 1992
