= Hideki Mitsui =

Japanese screenwriter

Hideki Mitsui (三井 秀樹, Mitsui Hideki; born 1963) is a Japanese screenwriter. He has composed the script and series composition for numerous anime series.

== Works ==
=== Anime television series ===
- 1987: Tsuide ni Tonchinkan (script); debut series
- 1989: Mado King Granzort (script)
- 1989: Gaki Deka (script)
- 1990: Magical Angel Sweet Mint (script)
- 1991: Karasu Tengu Kabuto (script)
- 1991: Jankenman (script)
- 1992: Floral Magician Mary Bell (series composition)
- 1992: Calimero (script)
- 1993: Dragon League (series composition)
- 1993: Tanoshii Willow Town (script)
- 1994: Nanatsu no Umi no Tico (script)
- 1994: Akazukin Chacha (script)
- 1994: Mahoujin Guru Guru (script)
- 1996: Lupin III: The Secret of Twilight Gemini (script)
- 1996: Meiken Lassie (script)
- 1997: Tenchi in Tokyo (script)
- 1997: Mashin Hero Wataru (script)
- 1998: El-Hazard (script)
- 1998: All Purpose Cultural Cat Girl Nuku Nuku (script)
- 1998: Nessa no Hao Gandara (script)
- 1998: Cyberteam in Akihabara (script)
- 1998: Popolocrois (script)
- 1999: Wild Arms: Twilight Venom (script)
- 1999: Future Boy Conan (script)
- 2000: Dokidoki? Densetsu: Mahoujin Guru Guru (script)
- 2000: Gate Keepers (script)
- 2001: Samurai Girl: Real Bout High School (script)
- 2001: Nono-chan (script)
- 2004: Ragnarok The Animation (series composition)
- 2004: Fantastic Children (script)
- 2005: Mix Master (script)
- 2005: Kotencotenco (series composition)
- 2005-2006: Cho Positive! Fighters (series composition)
- 2006: Magikano (series composition, script)
- 2006: Naikaku Kenryoku Hanzai Kyōsei Torishimarikan: Zaizen Jotarō (series composition)
- 2006: Galaxy Angel-Rune (script)
- 2007: Master of Epic The Animation Age (script)
- 2007: Jūsō Kikō Dancouga Nova (story construction)
- 2007-2010: Reborn! (script)
- 2012: Arashi no Yoru ni (script)
- 2014: Nobunaga the Fool (script)

=== Anime films ===
- 1996: Mahōjin Guru Guru (script)

=== Original video animations ===
- 1990: Shiawase no Katachi (script)
- 1999: Taiyō no Fune: Sol Bianca (script)
- 2000-2002: Magical Canan (script)
