= Masaaki Ōsumi =

Japanese animation director (born 1934)

- 大隅 正秋
- Born: November 26, 1934 (age 91); Hyōgo Prefecture, Japan
- Education: Tokyo University of Technology
- Occupations: Film director; television director

Masaaki Ōsumi (大隅 正秋, Ōsumi Masaaki; born November 26, 1934) is a Japanese theatre director and film director who is known for his work in animated television series and films.

He was born in Hyōgo Prefecture, Japan. He completed the Master's Program in Media Science, Graduate School of Media Science, Tokyo University of Technology. He is also the creative advisor at the Katayanagi Research Institute, Tokyo University of Technology.

== Biography ==
Ōsumi was born in Hyōgo Prefecture, Japan, and graduated from School of Media Science at the Tokyo University of Technology.

=== Career ===
He got his start in the entertainment industry as the leader of a puppet theater in Kobe. This led to an association with Tokyo Movie Shinsha, one of the first Japanese animation studios.

=== Moomin ===
In 1969, Ōsumi collaborated with animator Yasuo Ōtsuka in the Moomin television series, which was an immediate hit. But Finnish author Tove Jansson, the creator of the Moomin books, objected strongly to the depictions of the characters in the series. According to Jansson, "My Moomin is No car, No fight, and No money." The series was shifted to another studio after 26 episodes.

=== Lupin the Third ===
In 1971, he collaborated with Ōtsuka on the Lupin the Third Part I television series. Ōsumi directed the first seven episodes and episodes nine and twelve, with the remaining episodes being directed jointly by Hayao Miyazaki and Isao Takahata. When the series premiered in 1971, it suffered from very poor ratings and Ōsumi was fired from his role as director by the studio after episode three for refusing to adapt the sophisticated series for a children's audience. As an inside joke amongst the staff, in the first episode, the presiding judge's name on Fujiko's arrest warrant has "Masaaki Ōsumi" written in kanji using a similar sound.

In 1993, Ōsumi returned to the Lupin III franchise to direct the television special Orders to Assassinate Lupin. According to him, he had been estranged from Tokyo Movie Shinsha after stepping down from his position of director on Part 1. But years later, the studio reached out to him again and he went to go visit, where they asked him to direct. Ōsumi recalled, "They asked me 'We want to make this TV special the last one. Since you started this series, we want you to create the finale.' It was fascinating-like a twist of fate-to part with Lupin only to reunite with Lupin again."

In 1996, the world's very first virtual influencer, Kyoko Date, made her debut, with Ōsumi having been involved in the development.

In 2003, Ōsumi entered the Master's Program at the Graduate School of Media Science at the Tokyo University of Technology with Lupin III creator Monkey Punch to study computer animation. He completed the program two years later in 2005 and was appointed a Special Lecturer and Creative Advisor at the university's Katayanagi Research Institute.

=== Friendship ===
He had a deep friendship with animation director Yoshiyuki Tomino as they both had shared similar sensibilities. Ōsumi brought him on as a storyboard artist for Moomin and had trusted him with taking charge of the direction of La Seine no Star, where he served as chief director.

=== Methods ===
Ōsumi, similar to Isao Takahata, does not draw storyboards and conveys his direction verbally. Hiroyuki Okiura, who joined production on Run Melos!, took on storyboarding duties and said that the experience was life-changing and had brought a major change to himself.

== Filmography ==
=== Television anime ===
- Big X (1965): Director (episode 59)
- Obake no Q-Tarō (1965–1967): Director
- Perman (1967-1968): Director
- The Monster Kid (1968–1969): Director and Scriptwriter
- Moomin (1969): Director (episodes 1-26)
- Attack No. 1 (1969–1971):
- Lupin the Third Part I (1971): Director (episodes 1-12)
- Anime Document: Road to Munich (1971-1972): Director
- La Seine no Hoshi (1975): Chief director (episodes 1-26), executive director (episodes 27-39)
- Beeton the Robot (1976–1977): Original story, director, lyricist
- The Yearling (1983): Director
- Hashire Merosu (1992):
- Orders to Assassinate Lupin (1993): Director

=== Theatrical anime ===
- Lupin the Third: Pilot Film (1969): Director
- Attack No 1: World Championship Tears (1970): Director
- Moomin (1971): Director
- It's the Ocean! Set Sail! Niko Niko, Pun (1989): Scriptwriter
- Hashire Melos! (1993): Supervisor, Scriptwriter
- Doraemon: Nobita and the Spiral City (1997): CG supervisor

=== Original video animation ===
- Young Scheherazade (2004): Supervisor

=== TV show ===
- Ken-chan the Cake Shop (1972)
- Ken the Toy Shop Owner (1973)
