= Tokyo University of Technology =

University in Japan

Coordinates: 35°37′33″N 139°20′30″E

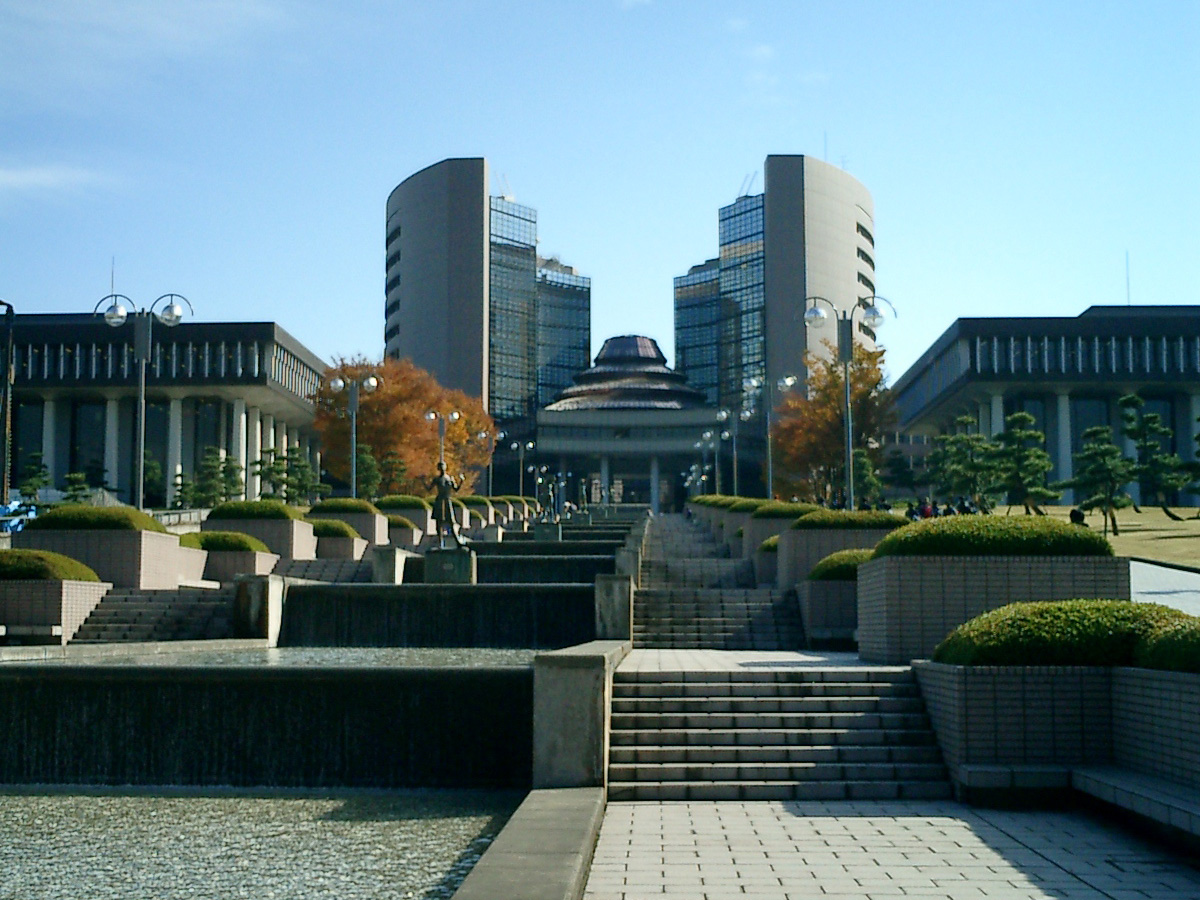
Tokyo University of Technology

Tokyo University of Technology (東京工科大学, Tōkyō kōka daigaku) is a private university in Hachiōji, Tokyo, Japan. The predecessor of the school was founded in May 1947. After becoming a vocational school in 1953, it was chartered as a university in 1986.
