= Sinbad (1992 film) =

1992 animated film

- Directed by: Masakazu Higuchi; Chinami Namba
- Written by: Jack Olesker
- Based on: Sinbad the Sailor from One Thousand and One Nights
- Produced by: Diane Eskenazi
- Music by: Richard Hurwitz; John Arrias
- Production company: Golden Films
- Distributed by: GoodTimes Entertainment
- Release date: May 18, 1992 (US)
- Running time: 50 minutes
- Countries: Japan; United States
- Language: English

Sinbad is an animated film originally released on May 18, 1992 and based on the classic Arabian Nights tale, Sinbad the Sailor. Like all other Golden Films productions, the film features a single theme song, "As Brave as a Man Can Be", written and composed by Richard Hurwitz and John Arrias. The plot involves Sinbad the Sailor and his companion Habeeb traveling to a strange island where Sinbad is forced to marry the king's daughter, and the dangers they get into while trying to find their way home.

Sinbad was produced by Golden Films and the American Film Investment Corporation. The film was released on DVD in 2003, packaged together with The Three Musketeers (1992) and The Count of Monte Cristo (1997).

== Plot ==
Sinbad and his loyal servant Habeeb find themselves aboard the ship of Captain Aziz, a trip for which Sinbad had spent all of his father's fortune. They crew spot an uncharted island, which Sinbad encourages the captain to approach, hoping that it holds untold riches. Sinbad, Habeeb and two other sailors take a rowboat to the island, which has a strange appearance: it is flat and bare, with no grass, trees or sand. The island shakes violently, and the two sailors return to Captain Aziz's ship, leaving Sinbad and Habeeb behind. The island is revealed to be the fin of a gigantic sea monster, which swims away. Captain Aziz's ship leaves as well, leaving Sinbad and Habeeb stranded in the middle of the ocean.

In the morning, Sinbad and his servant find that they have been carried to a strange island. They find water, nourishment and horses, which means that there should be people on the island. Sinbad and Habeeb find two foreign-dressed men, who are the sons of King Jamaal of the island of Salabat. These men welcome Sinbad and Habeeb, and lead them to their father's palace. King Jamaal welcomes Sinbad and Habeeb to his palace and, enchanted by the tales of Sinbad's many adventures, asks Sinbad to marry his daughter Nefia. Sinbad accepts, but unwillingly.

That night Sinbad reveals to Habeeb that he does not want to marry the king's daughter, and will leave the island in order to avoid fulfilling his promise. Captain Aziz's ship has come to the island, and Sinbad approaches the captain, who is glad to see him and agrees to help him escape. Habeeb and Sinbad sneak out of the castle by hiding in crates that are to be delivered to Captain Aziz as supposed presents from King Jamal. Their ruse is successful, but after Captain Aziz leaves the island, they are attacked by King Jamal's ships. King Jamal captures Sinbad and Habeeb and leaves them on an island as their punishment.
