= The Adventures of Robin Hood (disambiguation) =

The Adventures of Robin Hood is a 1938 film starring Errol Flynn. The title may also refer to:

- Adventures of Robin Hood, a 1906 novel by E. Charles Vivian
- The Adventures of Robin Hood, a 1956 novel by Roger Lancelyn Green
- The Adventures of Robin Hood, a 1979 novel by Patricia Leitch
- The Adventures of Robin Hood (1985 film), a 1985 animated television film produced by Burbank Films Australia
- The Adventures of Robin Hood (TV series), a 1950s television series starring Richard Greene
- The Adventures of Robin Hood (video game), a 1991 video game published by Millennium Interactive

== See also ==
- The Merry Adventures of Robin Hood, an 1883 novel by Howard Pyle
- The Adventures of Robin Hoodnik, a 1972 American animated television film produced by Hanna-Barbera
- The New Adventures of Robin Hood, a 1992 animated film produced by Burbank Animation Studios
- The New Adventures of Robin Hood, a 1997-98 television series
- The Zany Adventures of Robin Hood, a 1984 parody film starring George Segal
