= Kamasutra (manga) =

Japanese manga series

- Cover of Kamasutra #1 (1990)

カーマスートラ (Kāmasūtora)
- Genre: Adventure; Erotic comedy
- Manga
- Written by: Go Nagai; Kunio Nagatani
- Illustrated by: Go Nagai
- Published by: Tokuma Shoten
- Original run: March 31, 1990 – November 30, 1990
- Volumes: 4
- Original video animation

Kyukioku no Sex Adventure Kamasutra
- Directed by: Masayuki Ozeki
- Produced by: Seiji Tani
- Written by: Seiji Matsuoka
- Music by: Ken Yajima
- Studio: Animate; E&G Films; Toho video
- Licensed by: NA: Kitty Media; UK: Western Connection
- Released: April 24, 1992
- Runtime: 43 minutes
- Footnotes
- The manga was directly published in tankōbon without magazine serialization. Kunio Nagatani's participation is credited as composition since the manga consists of the main story by Nagai and of several texts written by Nagatani related to the Kamasutra, not to the main story.

Kamasutra (カーマスートラ, Kāmasūtora) is originally a four tankōbon manga (inspired by the homonymous book) created by Go Nagai and Kunio Nagatani and published by Tokuma Shoten in 1990. It was later adapted into an OVA, Kamasutra: The Ultimate Sex Adventure (究極のSEXアドベンチャー カーマスートラ, Kyūkyoku no Sekkusu Adobenchā Kāmasūtora), known in the United Kingdom as Kamasutra and in the United States as Kama Sutra and considered a hentai anime in the West.

== Plot ==
Prof. Isamu Aikawa is researching the location of an ancient Indian princess, Princess Surya of the Gupta Empire. Prof. Aikawa's grandson, Ryu, becomes involved with the research when a group of gangsters attacks Ryu and his spoiled girlfriend, Yukari, and ransacks his grandfather's apartment in search of information about the princess until he discovers the manuscript, which is an ancient Indian sex manual called Kamasutra. Ryu travels to India to help his grandfather, where he meets his grandfather's assistant, Shakti, and adventurous Indy Yakko, who introduces him to the techniques found in the "Kamasutra."

On the way to Prof. Aikawa's location, Ryu and Shakti are kidnapped by the same gangsters working for the Naga Tribe—an ancient Indian cult who are also seeking the princess for their own intentions—and are soon taken to the Palace of Naga. Ryu is sexually drained and physically debilitated while in captivity, but his grandfather and Yakko manage to rescue them. To search for Surya's whereabouts, Prof. Aikawa's group goes to Khajuraho Temple to find a Holy Grail-like artifact called the Sex Grail, which holds the key to eternal life and is sealed inside Rama's sculpture. With it, they can locate and retrieve the frozen princess Surya, who was resting at the Himalayas, using the grail to revive Surya from the suspended animated state.

Meanwhile, having failed to obtain the grail, the leader of the tribe, the Old Master, dies, and his son, Prince Rudra, assumes the leadership and sexually assaults Jody, the Old Master's nurse, in cold blood. He then personally kidnaps Surya to obtain her love juice and then tries to obtain the grail by manipulating Ryu into an exchange of the princess for the grail. After obtaining the grail (and kidnapping Ryu in the process), he sends his henchman, Hige Godzilla, to trick Yukari into raping Surya for them, which she does, and is also captured and jailed along with Ryu before they are crushed and stuck by a wall trap, only for Yakko to track them down and rescue them. While trying to escape, they're confronted by Rudra, who uses his mystical power to attack them, but they manage to escape nonetheless.

Prince Rudra obtains the Sex Grail and is forced to marry Surya in an attempt to gain immortality himself. However, during the wedding ceremony, they're interrupted by the arrival of Captain Austin, an American soldier and Jody's father, who stages an invasion against Rudra to avenge his daughter. He manages to escape along with Surya and the grail through the Boat of Garuda, where he opens a portal to enter them into the earthly paradise of Shambhala, which is hidden inside the waterfall. He is soon followed by Ryu and Yakko with the help of Prof. Aikawa and Captain Austin. As they entered Shambhala, Ryu and Yakko found a giant golden egg-shaped vessel, the Space Egg, floating like a sun, and they continued to rescue Surya.

In the meantime, Prof. Aikawa goes to Khajuraho once again to find another way of entering Shambhala along with Shakti, Yukari, and Hige, by using the grail counterpart, the Cup of Death, and joining them in a foursome position, which is similar to Khajuraho's erotic sculpture. As Prince Rudra and Princess Surya enter the Space Egg, Prof. Aikawa and his allies (who are shown naked in a foursome position) appear before them. Soon after, Ryu and Yakko also arrive, and Ryu manages to catch Rudra just as he enters the egg with Surya, and the grail falls outside the egg, just as the Space Egg elevates itself and flies towards outer space.

Rudra and Ryu engage in the fight, only to be interrupted by the group of celestial angels who challenge Ryu and Rudra with a final task to perform in group sex based on the Kamasutra, as only one can be together with Surya. Ryu decides that he wants to do it with her, leading the angels to execute Rudra with a Nāga-like creature and kill him before being dragged out of the egg, leaving Ryu and Surya to have sex in eternal pleasure as the angels disappear. Having fulfilled its purpose, Space Egg split into two vessels, separating both Ryu and Surya.

At the same time, Prof. Aikawa, Yakko, Shakti, Yukari, and Hige manage to get all of them back from Shambhala to Earth using the Boat of Garuda with the help of the Sex Grail. As they return, Prof. Aikawa's group sees the two Space Eggs fall to Earth; one falls into a river, where Ryu is released, while Surya remains inside the other, floating in the sky. Surya fulfills his promise to expect their child, puts herself into an eternal slumber as the Space Egg gets smaller and attaches itself to the Grail. Afterward, the next day, the Sex Grail and the Space Egg are returned to their original place and sealed into the sculpture, while Ryu and his group leave India and return to Japan safely.

== Characters ==
- Ryu Aikawa (阿井川 竜, aikawa ryū; played by Yasunori Matsumoto): The hero of the story, a handsome but sexually inexperienced young man. During the course of the story, he is taught in the Kamasutra so that he can conquer the final task. In the anime, he is the reincarnation of Gopal, a knight who protected princess Surya.
- Princess Surya (スーリャ姫, sūrya hime; played by Sakiko Tamagawa): An immortal ancient Indian princess who holds the secret of eternal life. In the anime, she knows Ryu from his past life.
- Prince of Naga (ナーガのプリンス, nāga no purinsu; played by Jurota Kusogi), also known as Rudra (ルドラ, rudora) or Rudrasin (ルドラシン, rudorashin): The main antagonist after the death of the Old Master, he seeks to obtain the Sex Grail and kidnapping Surya as his bride in order to achieve eternal life. He was a Navy Lieutenant until he assumed the role of leader of the Naga Tribe. In the anime, it is implied that he is the reincarnation of Ryu's killer.
- Shakti (シャクティ, shakutei; played by Naoko Matsui): Prof. Aikawa assistant and lover. She is the first to introduce Ryu into the art of the Kamasutra. Her real name is Irene Adolfo
- Prof. Isamu Aikawa (阿井川 勇博士, aikawa isamu hakase; played by Kenichi Ogata): Ryu's grandfather and the archaeologist behind the discovery of Princess Surya. In the manga, he constantly engages in sexual acts with Shakti.
- Yukari Tsuji (辻ユカリ, tsuji yukari; alternatively written 辻ゆかり in the OVA, played by Chieko Honda): a spoiled yet sassy girl who is Ryu's girlfriend.
- Indy Yakko (インディやっこ, indei yakko; played by) Masami Kikuchi: A self-proclaimed adventurer who is a parody of Indiana Jones and comic relief. He successfully helps Ryu during the course of the story. His real name is Hiya Yakko.
- Hige Godzilla (ヒゲゴジラ, higegojira; played by Naoki Tatsuta): The character from the Yadamon manga and Harenchi Gakuen. In this story, he is helping the Naga tribe and acts as the main henchman/servant of the prince.
- Old Master (老師, rōshi; played by Ikuya Sawaki): An ill, disfigured old man with a snake-like voice, and the former leader of the Naga Tribe who is seeking the secret of the "Sex Grail" and ancient Princess Surya. He is the father of the prince and is also called Beshuma.

== Media ==
=== Manga ===
The manga was published in four volumes by Tokuma Shoten.

No.	Release date	ISBN
1	March 31, 1990	978-4-19-444201-3
2	June 30, 1990	978-4-19-444271-6
3	September 30, 1990	978-4-19-444351-5
4	November 30, 1990	978-4-19-444400-0

=== Anime ===
The OVA adaptation, titled Kyukioku no Sex Adventure Kamasutra (究極のSEXアドベンチャー カーマスートラ, Kyūkyoku no Sekkusu Adobenchā Kāmasūtora; translated as Kamasutra: The Ultimate Sex Adventure), was released on April 24, 1992.

The anime was released in a subtitled version VHS in the United Kingdom in 1994, by Western Connection.

In the United States, it was originally released by Kitty Media on May 5, 1998, in two versions, an edited "general release" and an unedited version. Kitty Media also released the OVA on DVD on January 28, 2003, this time including English dubbed audio.
