= Mitki =

The Mitki (Russian: Митьки́; pronounced [mʲɪtʲˈki]) are an art group in St. Petersburg, Russia.

== The Mitki movement ==
The Mitki movement originally emerged from Vladimir Shinkarev’s literary work Mitki, which consists of eight chapters. The first five chapters were written between 1984 and 1985, though the book was not finished until four years later. The complete version was officially published in 1990. It encompasses a collection of ironic and absurd essays, anecdotes, conversations and opinions on different cultural subjects, which extend artistic sensibility and development into a comprehensive and cohesive life philosophy that even includes a specifically developed language. Although Mitki is fictional it draws on the characteristics of real people, combining these to create Mityok, the archetypal member of the Mitki group who acts on the instructions provided by the Mitki script. The Mitki group consisted of a number of St. Petersburg friends and artists of which were the main members Vladimir Shinkarev, Alexander Florensky and Dmitri Shagin. Shinkarev's eponymous book supplied the group with the manifesto for their emergent movement.

The first collective exhibition of Mitki paintings in 1984 ended peacefully, but the second in St. Petersburg was raided by police. After Glasnost the group's work became accepted and was soon shown beyond St. Petersburg. Mitki, written before and after Mikhail Gorbachev’s Perestroika in 1987, expresses the transitions and associated anxieties of its time. Shinkarev and Florensky both left the Mitki group to develop their own work in the new Russia.

The Mitki do not promote specific artistic principles, being instead united by a certain collective spirit: an optimistic and straightforward world-view, representation of the wide breadth of the Russian soul, respect for art, humour and freedom. Their official slogan is "The Mitki don't want to defeat anybody, which is why they will conquer the world."

=== Mitki-Mayer ===
Mitki-Mayer
- Directed by: A. Vassilyev
- Written by: V. Shinkarev; V. Tikhomirov
- Music by: Boris Grebenshchikov
- Release date: 1992
- Running time: 54 minutes
- Country: Russia
- Language: Russian

In 1992, the group released a 54-minute animated film called Mitki-Mayer. Directed by A. Vassilyev, the film's plot focuses on a rich American named Mr. Mayer reading the Mitki book. After Mr. Mayer witnesses a Russian man who cannot swim jump from a ship in a futile attempt to rescue a woman, he visits his cabin to find out what kind of man he was, where he finds the Mitki book. Most of the rest of the film is spent illustrating each of the book's chapters. Finally, having finished the book, Mr. Mayer decides to go to Russia, gives up his riches, and joins the Mitki movement. The film was released on video.
