= The Little Punker =

1992 film

Der Kleene Punker
- Theatrical release poster
- Directed by: Michael Schaack
- Written by: Jackie Niebisch
- Based on: Der kleene Punker by Jackie Niebisch
- Produced by: Michael Schaack
- Starring: Rainer Strecker; Ilona Shulz
- Edited by: Angelika Schaack
- Music by: Wolfgang von Henko
- Release date: 1992
- Running time: 80 minutes
- Country: Germany
- Language: German

The Little Punker (German: Der kleene Punker) is a 1992 German animated feature independent dramedy film by director Michael Schaack.

== Voice cast ==
- Rainer Strecker ... Amadeus
- Ilona Schulz ... Pinke
- Reinhard Krökel ... Hübi
- Gerlach Fiedler ... Schulzeee
- Thomas Struck ... Schulzes Boss
- Ernie Reinhardt ... Oma Neumann
- Michael Kleiber ... Der 'wahre Udo', Schwarzwald-Oma, und Kontrolletti
- Dieter Landuris ... Raffke u.a.
- Claus-Peter Damitz ... Bogie u.a.
- Ruth Rockenschaub ... Kontrolletta u.a.
- Gerhard Garbers ... Postbote u.a.
- Jürgen Wohlrabe ... Vorsitzender
- Susanne Stangl ... Passantin
- Fuat Saka ... Dicker Müllmann
- Ünal Gümüs ... Dünner Müllmann
