= GoodTimes Entertainment =

American home video company (1984–2005)

GT Media, Inc.
- Final logo as GoodTimes Entertainment; used from 1997 to 2005
- Formerly: GoodTimes Home Video Corp. (1984–2000); GoodTimes Entertainment Ltd. (1997–2005); GT Brands Holdings LLC (2003–2005)
- Type: Subsidiary
- Industry: Home video company
- Founded: 1984; 42 years ago
- Defunct: 2009; 17 years ago
- Fate: Folded into Gaiam, Inc.
- Headquarters: 16 East 40th Street, New York City, N.Y. 10016
- Key people: Kenneth Cayre; Joseph Cayre; Stanley Cayre
- Products: Public domain works and anime; Fitness videos
- Parent: Quadrangle Capital Partners (2003–2005); Gaiam (2005–2009)

GT Media, Inc. was an American home video company that originated in 1984 under the name of GoodTimes Home Video. Though it produced its own titles, the company was well known due to its distribution of media from third parties and classics. The founders for the company were the brothers Kenneth, Joseph and Stanley Cayre (often referred to and credited simply as the "Cayre Brothers") of Salsoul Records. Its headquarters were in Midtown Manhattan, New York City. The company had a distribution facility in Jersey City, New Jersey and a duplication facility in Bayonne, New Jersey, known as GTK Duplicating Co.. After the bankruptcy, GoodTimes' parent company was sold to Yoga-focused content company Gaiam in September 2005.

== History ==
GoodTimes began with the distribution of copies of public domain titles. Though the company also produced and distributed many low-priced fitness videos such as the 29 Minute Workout video series, its most recognized line of products were the series of low-budget traditionally animated films from companies such as Jetlag Productions, Golden Films, and Blye Migicovsky Productions, as well as a selection of the works of Burbank Animation Studios. Many of its home-video titles—such as Aladdin, Beauty and the Beast, Pinocchio, Sinbad, The Little Mermaid, The Three Musketeers and Thumbelina—were named similarly or identically to big-budget animated films from Disney and other major studios (though their plots were sometimes very different), and GoodTimes would often release these films close to the theatrical and/or home video releases of the major film studios.

This was largely legal, as the stories of the big-budget films were based on fairy tales and classic literature that had long been in the public domain, and the major studios had little room to claim exclusive rights to the stories or the main characters. The Walt Disney Company sued GoodTimes in 1993, because the videotape packaging closely resembled Disney's, allegedly creating the potential of confusing consumers into unintentionally purchasing a GoodTimes title, when they instead meant to purchase a film from Disney.

As a result of this lawsuit, GoodTimes was required by law to print its name atop all of its future VHS covers, in order to clearly demonstrate to the public at large that this was not the "blockbuster" title that they would be purchasing. Despite these changes, however, GoodTimes continued to produce animated films based on public domain works.

At the Summer CES 1985, GoodTimes launched a home video label Kids Klassics Home Video, which was specifically designed for a children's audience. The first Kids Klassics videos were 52 different cartoons, which were all meant to be in color and received a 50-50 joint venture with Remco to market the Mel-O-Toons cartoons by Storer Broadcasting. The company made its first licensed client in 1986, by signing a deal with Worldvision Home Video to reissue titles on VHS, through the Kids Klassics label, which were mostly Hanna-Barbera cartoons.

This was followed in 1987 by signing a deal with major video distributor MCA Home Video to license these titles to VHS, mainly the Universal Pictures catalog for a price of $15. That year, Goodtimes and Kids Klassics merged their distribution arms to form Goodtimes/Kids Klassics Distribution Corp. In the 1990s they expanded the company into GT Publishing, a division of the company that published children's books under the Inchworm Press imprint.

Expanding from home video distribution, GoodTimes founded its spin-off, GT Interactive as a way to distribute computer and video games in 1995. This company was sold to the French game publisher Infogrames in 1999. At different times, GoodTimes contracted with Columbia Pictures, NBC, HBO, Worldvision Enterprises, Hanna-Barbera, Orion Home Video, Universal Pictures and Paramount Pictures to release inexpensive tapes of many of their films and TV series. In addition, GoodTimes released several compilations assembled from public domain films, film trailers, earlier television programs and newsreels. Most of these were credited to Film Shows, Inc.

In February 2003, Quadrangle Capital Partners purchased GoodTimes Entertainment for $90 million plus $160 million in debt, and rebranded the company as GT Brands.

In July 2005, GT Brands Holdings filed for Chapter 11 Bankruptcy protection. Gaiam subsequently acquired all of GoodTimes' assets for $40 million. The deal was closed that September and GT Brands Holdings LLC was renamed as GT Media, Inc., becoming Gaiam's general-interest label that released films and animation from DIC Entertainment and mockbusters from The Asylum.

By the end of the 2000s, the GT Media brand was no longer used by Gaiam, with the company solely distributing fitness and yoga media under the latter label. In April 2012, the company acquired and merged with Vivendi Entertainment, renaming the combined subsidiary Gaiam Vivendi Entertainment. In October 2013, Cinedigm purchased Gaiam Vivendi Entertainment for $51.5 million; after this Gaiam had exited the home video industry, with the subsidiary merging with Cinedigm's New Video to form a standalone distributor under the Cinedigm name.

== Library ==
Prior to the company's bankruptcy, GoodTimes Entertainment produced at that time a TV series called Wulin Warriors. The series was an edited version of Pili, produced by Broadway Video and Animation Collective for Cartoon Network's Toonami block in 2006.

The company also produced the children's musical live-action video series Treehouse Trolls Birthday Day and Treehouse Trolls Fun and Wonder (1992), the latter being remembered as Rachael Harris's first contribution to the film industry.
