= Aladdin (1992 Golden Films film) =

Short animated film

- Aladdin and the genie
- Directed by: Masakazu Higuchi; Chinami Namba
- Written by: Jack Olesker
- Based on: Aladdin from One Thousand and One Nights
- Produced by: Diane Eskenazi
- Starring: Jeff Bennett; Corey Burton; Cam Clarke; Candi Milo
- Music by: Richard Hurwitz; John Arrias
- Production company: Golden Films
- Distributed by: GoodTimes Entertainment
- Release date: April 27, 1992 (US)
- Running time: 48 minutes
- Countries: Japan; United States
- Language: English

Aladdin is a 1992 animated fantasy film. It is based on the classic Arabian Nights story Aladdin, translated by Antoine Galland. Aladdin was produced by American Film Investment Corporation (later Golden Films). Like all six productions that followed, the film features a single original song, "Rub the Lamp", written and composed by Richard Hurwitz and John Arrias, while a selection of classical music completed the rest of its soundtrack. It was released straight to video on April 27, 1992 by Trimark, as the first of a series of seven weekly releases of animated adaptations. It was then acquired and re-released by GoodTimes Entertainment in 1993 and later reissued on DVD in 2002 as part of the distributor's (now Goodtimes Entertainment) "Collectible Classics" line of products.

== Plot ==
A young boy named Aladdin lives a poor life with his mother. A shifty man named Hassim approaches Aladdin claiming to be his long lost uncle and persuades him to come on a journey promising riches. Once in the desert amid some ruins, Hassim performs an incantation to open a cave and Aladdin realizes that Hassim is not his uncle. Hassim only brought him here because he is the only one who can enter the cave interior. Aladdin reluctantly enters the cave and finds what Hassim was looking for: an old lamp. Fearing that Hassim will kill him after he gets what he wants, Aladdin refuses to hand over the lamp and Hassim closes the cave trapping Aladdin. Unwittingly, Aladdin rubs the lamp and releases a powerful genie who can grant any wish. Aladdin makes a wish to return to his home. After his safe return, Aladdin's mother disregards the lamp and Aladdin keeps it hidden and remains silent about it.

Four years later, Aladdin is captivated by the Sultan's daughter Layla and sneaks into the bathing house to see her. Aladdin escapes the guards and returns home to tell his mother his wish to marry the princess. The next day, Aladdin's mother presents a sack of jewels he obtained from the cave before the sultan. The sultan's conniving vizier (who has plans to have his own son marry the princess) convinces the sultan that his daughter is worth more than the jewels and that Aladdin should bring bigger riches and many servants. With the aid of the lamp, Aladdin accomplishes this. The sultan allows Aladdin to marry Layla and Aladdin has the genie build a palace by the city for the married couple to live in peacefully.

Hassim hears about Aladdin's success with the lamp from the medicine woman Fatima. Hassim travels to Aladdin's palace. With Aladdin out on a hunt, Hassim tricks Layla into swapping the genie's lamp for a new one and makes a wish for the palace and princess to be transported to Marrakesh. Hearing about his daughter's disappearance, the sultan has Aladdin arrested. Before Aladdin can be sentenced, Fatima (who did not get her end of the bargain with Hassim) approaches and reveals the whereabouts of Layla. With his mother in the sultan's custody and one month to put things right, Aladdin travels to Marrakesh, sneaks into his palace and swipes the lamp from a sleeping Hassim. With the lamp back in his possession, Aladdin wishes his wife and palace to be returned to his homeland.

Hassim notices Aladdin's liberation and swears revenge. He holds Fatima at knifepoint and steals her clothes to disguise himself as her, then beckons the princess to have Aladdin wish for the egg of the fabled Roc to bring them good luck. The genie is not able to grant this wish as the Roc is superior to him and reveals that Fatima is actually Hassim. Aladdin feigns illness to bring Hassim right where he wants him. Aladdin and Hassim duel, ending up with Hassim tripping on his robe and is accidentally impaled by his own sword, killing himself. Aladdin and the princess then live happily ever after without the fear of anyone stealing the lamp again.

== Cast ==
- Jeff Bennett – Genie
- Corey Burton – Sultan
- Cam Clarke – Aladdin, Vizier's Son
- Lara Cody - Princess Layla
- Candi Milo – Fatima, Aladdin's Mother
- B. J. Ward - Mira

== Disney lawsuit ==
Shortly after its release on VHS by GoodTimes Entertainment, The Walt Disney Company brought an unfair competition and infringement lawsuit, claiming that the GoodTimes packaging deliberately imitated the style of the images used by Disney to promote its own Aladdin animated film thereby deceiving consumers into thinking they were buying the Disney film (which, at the time, had not yet been released on VHS). Federal court, however, dismissed the suit on the grounds that Aladdin was a public domain work and the GoodTimes packaging (with an enormous, mustachioed gold or orange genie) was sufficiently distinct from the Disney version (with an enormous, bearded blue genie).
