= Hashire Melos! =

1992 film by Tomoharu Katsumata

- Poster for the 1992 film

走れメロス (Hashire Merosu!)
- Genre: Adventure, Drama
- Anime television film
- Directed by: Tomoharu Katsumata
- Written by: Keinosuke Uekusa
- Music by: Katsuhiro Tsuboiri
- Studio: Toei Animation
- Released: February 7, 1981
- Runtime: 68 minutes
- Anime film
- Directed by: Masaaki Osumi
- Written by: Masaaki Osumi
- Music by: Kazumasa Oda
- Studio: Visual 80
- Released: July 25, 1992
- Runtime: 107 minutes

Hashire Melos! (走れメロス!, Hashire Merosu!; lit. Run Melos!) is the title of two Japanese animated films. The first was directed by Tomoharu Katsumata and released on Japanese television on February 7, 1981. It was 68 minutes long, and its official title did not include the exclamation mark on the end.

The second, with the exclamation mark, was a 107-minute remake of the first and was released on July 25, 1992. It featured direction and screenplay by Masaaki Osumi, music by Kazumasa Oda, art by Hiroyuki Okiura and Satoshi Kon, and background art by Hiroshi Ohno.

The first film was produced by Toei and the second by Visual 80, and both were based on the original short story written by Osamu Dazai in 1940.

== Plot ==
The story takes places in 360 BC and tells the tale of Melos, a Greek country man who is arrested and accused of conspiracy against the king. He gets three days to travel to his sister's wedding while Selinentius (Selinae), a brilliant sculptor who Melos just met, stays as a hostage. As opposed to Osamu Dazai's original story, Melos is here innocent of the conspiracy accusation.

== Cast for the 1992 film ==
- Aki Mizusawa as Queen Phryne
- Akiji Kobayashi as Dionysius II
- Akina Nakamori as Raisa, Selinentius' lover
- Kōichi Kitamura as Village Chief
- Kōichi Yamadera as Melos
- Megumi Hayashibara as Clea, Melos' sister
- Shinji Ogawa as Selinentius
- Takeshi Aono as Calippus
- Takuma Gōno as Pipor

== See also ==
- List of animated feature films
