= Iron Virgin Jun =

Japanese manga

- Cover of Iron Virgin Jun (1992 edition)

鉄の処女JUN (Tetsu no Shojo JUN)
- Manga
- Written by: Go Nagai
- Published by: Shogakukan
- Magazine: Big Comic Spirits
- Published: 1983
- Volumes: 1
- Original video animation
- Directed by: Fumio Maezono
- Produced by: Kenji Nagai; Masato Takami; Satsuki Mizuno
- Written by: Fumio Maezono
- Music by: Keiju Ishikawa
- Studio: Triangle Staff
- Licensed by: Media Blasters
- Released: July 21, 1992
- Runtime: 46 minutes

Iron Virgin Jun (鉄の処女JUN, Tetsu no Shojo JUN) is a Japanese manga series created by Go Nagai in 1983. It was adapted into an original video animation (OVA) feature in 1992.

== Manga synopsis ==
Iron Virgin Jun is a bawdy comedy based on the physical prowess of the title character Jun Asuka. Jun, a beautiful maiden with an unusually muscular body and physical strength, is exploited constantly by prestigious family males trying to take Jun's virginity and buy into the Asuka estate.

=== Part 1 ===
In act 1 Jun meets the innocent and hapless young butler Oonami Kurata (whose name is a pun which roughly translates to "big-wave tanker") who is surprised to see Jun chained up by her parents and with no freedom. Oonami assists Jun while she is chained so she can pee, and so that she is fed. Soon after Oonami gets bullied by the muscular Mauta Nandou of the scheming Nandou family, a suitor of Jun. Jun unchains herself and reveals her muscular body and beats up Mouta. Her mother is then introduced as a giant ugly ogre-like woman from whom Jun had inherited her strength. She commends Jun's victory but forcefully plots to make Jun meet an even greater family than the Nandous. Disagreeing with her mother, Jun wrestles with her and defeats her by pulling her breasts. She then plans on running away from home with Oonami.

=== Part 2 ===
Jun's auntie Maki Asuka, an androgynous and suave woman with two tough-looking male butlers, arrives at the family home interrupting her plan of escape. At family dinner, Maki tells Jun of the jungles of the world she has seen which she claims excites women's true passions (images suggesting that she has sex with animals) and all the while Jun's mother and Maki plot to take away Jun's virginity. Maki takes Jun into her own lush estate with its jungle-like garden and ties her and Oonami up, before having a threesome with her two butlers in front of them, describing her addiction to sex in a way to convince Jun to give in her virginity. She and her butlers make an advance on the tied-up Jun before a silly ending sees a masked superhero Tutankhamen with a shotgun save Jun and Oonami. Jun replies by saying "thanks dad", embarrassing the avenger, who is undoubtedly the father who till now was a sidelined character beneath the mother's authority.

=== Part 3 ===
Jun and Oonami finally escape and plan to go to Tokyo, Jun leaving her mother with the ultimatum that she will only give her virginity to a man stronger than her and who can subdue her. Jun suggests to Oonami that they no longer speak as mistress and butler but as a simply male and female friend. Trying to avoid the cool areas of Tokyo, Oonami instead takes Jun to his home, only to find Ryo Asuka of the Devilman series waiting there to charm Jun (and himself take her to the adventurous parts of Tokyo making Oonami jealous). At a nightclub called "magic," Ryo seduces Jun and tells her his nicknames of "Count Dracula" and "Satan" with some idea that he will use her for a sacrifice to Satan. Instead, Ryo meets Akira Fudo, the Devilman, fighting in an alleyway and asks him to incapacitate Jun so he can take her bound to his mansion, which he does. Now taken prisoner, Jun is told by Ryo that their families were two split sides of the Asuka dynasty and that he is from the grandfather and her from the grandmother, who had both separated leaving Ryo's side poor. In a scheming plot, Ryo calls his grandfather into mate with Jun (who looks to his memory like the late grandmother) and thus renew the true Asuka legacy. The grandfather comes in dressed as a satanic goat but stumbles and loses his mask showing his meekness. Drooling over the tied-up Jun he reaches out to molest her but dies on her lap. Ryo relents and is pleased that he died happily and lets Jun go.

=== Part 4 ===
Jun's mother sends out a warrant and offers millions of yen to anyone who will rape Jun of her virginity, giving descriptions of her and Oonami, who then disguise themselves in sunglasses in public. At a hotel, Jun strips before the blushing and overly subservient Oonami, saying that she ran away with him because she loves him and wants him to take her virginity. Oonami strips and gains the courage to have sex with Jun, the scene showing a metaphorical tidal wave spilling them out of the top floor of the apartment building before they sail away together in the sun, Oonami living up to his namesake of the big-wave tanker.

== Anime plot summary ==
=== Characters ===
Jun Asuka: Voiced by Chisa Yokoyama (Japanese) & Wendee Lee (English) – The Main Protagonist from Iron virgin Girl
Kurata (Daiba) Oonami: Voiced by Daiki Nakamura (Japanese) & Peter Doyle (English) – Kurata " Daiba " Ohnami is the Male Protagonist from Iron Virgin Girl
Kaidomaru: Voiced by Uncredited Cast – Kaidōmaru (Kaidou) is the Minor Antagonist from Iron Virgin Girl
