= Joker Marginal City =

1992 Japanese original video animation

JOKER マージナル・シティ
- Genre: Cyberpunk, action
- Original video animation
- Directed by: Osamu Yamasaki
- Written by: Hiroyuki Ōnuma; Junichi Watanabe
- Studio: Studio Sign
- Released: April 21, 1992
- Runtime: 45 minutes
- Episodes: 1

Joker Marginal City, also rendered in English as Joker - Marginal City or Joker: Marginal City (Japanese: JOKER マージナル・シティ), is a 1992 Japanese science fiction original video animation (OVA) directed by Osamu Yamasaki. Produced by Studio Sign, it is based on the Joker manga series written by Yuu Maki and illustrated by Katsumi Michihara. The story follows a shapeshifting synthetic human employed as a special law enforcement officer who investigates a series of murders committed by another artificial being. The anime combines cyberpunk action with themes of artificial life, gender and human identity.

== Plot ==
In a futuristic society, Joker is a genetically engineered synthetic human serving as a Special Judicial Officer, with the combined authority of a police detective, judge and executioner. Possessing enhanced physical abilities and the power to assume other people's appearances, including switching between male and female forms, Joker is romantically involved with Rīn Rikudō, a young male detective in the Japan State Police. Although Rīn reciprocates Joker's affection when Joker appears as a woman, he is uncomfortable with their relationship when Joker assumes a male form.

Rīn and his colleagues investigate a series of murders in which young women have had their hearts removed. During the investigation, Joker and Rīn spend time together on a date, which is interrupted when Joker is called away on official business. Later, Joker confronts the killer, another synthetic human named Saki, but is seriously wounded in the encounter and takes refuge at Rīn's apartment.

Saki was created by the scientist Dr. Bayfarm, who rejected the artificial being as a failure for lacking a "heart", meaning the capacity for human emotion. Hoping to gain their creator's acceptance, Saki begins murdering women and collecting their physical hearts. Also injured during the confrontation with Joker, Saki is subsequently found and helped by Rīn, whom Saki mistakes for Dr. Bayfarm.

When Saki attempts to take Rīn's heart, Joker intervenes. During the ensuing confrontation, Saki transforms into a monstrous form, but is eventually destroyed by Rīn.

Following the incident, Joker disappears from Rīn's life. Rīn speculates that Joker remains somewhere in the city, continuing the search for Dr. Bayfarm, whose whereabouts and ultimate fate remain unresolved. (Note: The Anime Encyclopedia (2015) provides a substantially different synopsis, describing a young man escaping from a research facility and being assisted by a reporter and other Jokers while pursued by a killer known as the "Heartless Assassin". This account differs from the plot descriptions given by Fred Patten (Cartoon Research) and Steven Pearce (The Encyclopedia of Science Fiction).)

== Production and release ==
Joker Marginal City was adapted from the cyberpunk action manga Joker, written by Yuu Maki and illustrated by Katsumi Michihara, serialized in Wings and published by Shinshokan.

The OVA was directed by Osamu Yamasaki and written by Hiroyuki Ōnuma and Junichi Watanabe, with animation production by Studio Sign. Character design was credited to Taeko Satō, Miyuki Shimabukuro and Chuichi Iguchi. The voice cast includes Shō Hayami and Michie Tomizawa as Joker's male and female forms respectively, Yasunori Matsumoto as Rīn, Jūrōta Kosugi as Dr. Bayfarm and Urara Takano as Saki.

The single-episode OVA was released in Japan on April 21, 1992, on VHS and LaserDisc, distributed by Happinet Entertainment under its Cyclone label. Japanese catalogues and The Anime Encyclopedia list a running time of 45 minutes. Animation historian Fred Patten described a version containing approximately 37 minutes of the main presentation followed by additional material, including a five-minute recap. He criticized this material as unnecessary padding and speculated that it had been added to bring the running time above 40 minutes, a threshold sometimes used to distinguish feature films from short films. Similarly, Steven Pearce of The Encyclopedia of Science Fiction noted that the OVA is 42 minutes long, and that time is made from "actually 37 minutes [of actual content] plus the advert for the video". According to Patten, the OVA had not received an official American release as of 2016, although a fan-subtitled version circulated.

== Reception ==
Writing in the third edition of The Anime Encyclopedia (2015), Jonathan Clements and Helen McCarthy described Joker Marginal City as "stylish" and "well-paced", praising its exploration of gender and genetic engineering. They compared its themes to those of Bagi, the Monster of Mighty Nature (1984) and its visual presentation to the conventions of boys' love anime such as Fake (1996).

Steven Pearce of The Encyclopedia of Science Fiction similarly noted the film's treatment of LGBT themes, particularly Joker's ability to change gender and the character's relationship with Rīn. Pearce regarded the treatment as broadly sympathetic, although it considered Rīn's reactions to apparent same-sex intimacy dated, and compared them to the concept of gay panic. The encyclopedia also observed that several aspects of the story, including Joker's origins, their employers and the fate of Dr. Bayfarm, remained unexplained, suggesting that the work might have been intended to lead to further installments. None were produced, and the encyclopedia assessed the OVA as "minor but watchable".

Fred Patten, reviewing the OVA for Cartoon Research in 2016, was critical of its treatment of gender and sexuality. He considered the depiction of Joker's female form stereotypically weak in comparison with the character's powerful male form, and suggested that its humor involving homosexuality would have complicated an American release in the early 1990s. He also found the plot's resolution unsatisfactory, questioning the motivations of several characters and criticizing the additional footage at the end as unnecessary padding.
