= Tottoi =

Tottòi

Japanese name
- Kanji: トトイ
Transcriptions
- Revised Hepburn: Totoi
- Directed by: Norifumi Kiyozumi
- Written by: Ryūzō Nakanishi
- Based on: Tottòi by Gianni Padoan
- Music by: Kōichi Sakata
- Production company: Nippon Animation
- Release dates: 22 August 1992 (Japan); 12 November 1993 (USA)
- Running time: 80 minutes

Tottòi (トトイ, Totoi) is a 1992 Japanese anime film, based on the Italian novel series by Gianni Padoan. Tottòi was dubbed into English and distributed by Celebrity Home Entertainment in 1993 under the title of The Secret of the Seal.

== Plot ==
After his mother's death, Antonio (nicknamed Tottòi in Sardinian language) and his father move to Sardinia, where Tottòi's father grew up as a boy. Tottòi's adventures begin when he sees a monk seal, despite the common belief that they had long since died out.

== Voice cast ==
Character	Original	English
Tottòi	Daisuke Namikawa	Christine Cavanaugh
Billia	Kappei Yamaguchi	Scott Menville
Pedro	Toshiharu Sakurai	Scott Menville
Renato	Jun'ichi Kanemaru	Unknown
Nanni	Seizô Katô	Bernard Erhard
Cipriano/Cipriano Muggiani	Kei Tomiyama	Bernard Erhard
Stanis Muggiani	Kenichi Ogata	Bernard Erhard
Caterina	Naoko Matsui	Barbara Goodson
Gizza Muggiani	Miyuki Ichijo	Barbara Goodson
Francesca Muggiani	Chieko Honda	Barbara Goodson
Marco/Captain Marko	Ikuya Sawaki	Gregg Berger
Massimo	Takumi Yamazaki	Unknown
Jack Land	Takeshi Watabe	Unknown
Greg	Chafurin	Unknown
Hoit	Daisuke Gōri	Unknown
Totorino	Ken Yamaguchi	Unknown
Guide	Wataru Takagi	Rob Paulsen
