= Karasu Tengu Kabuto =

Japanese manga series

- Cover of the Taiwanese edition of volume 2 of the manga Karasu Tengu Kabuto

鴉天狗カブト
- Genre: Historical fantasy
- Manga
- Written by: Buichi Terasawa
- Published by: Shueisha
- English publisher: ComicsOne
- Magazine: Fresh Jump
- Original run: 1987 – 1988
- Volumes: 2
- Anime television series
- Directed by: Kiyomu Fukuda; Takashi Watanabe
- Written by: Hideki Mitsui
- Music by: Seikou Nagaoka
- Studio: Terasawa Production; MTV (1–8); Azeta Pictures (10–30
- Original network: NHK
- Original run: July 29, 1990 – June 30, 1991
- Episodes: 39 (26 episodes to cover the manga with 13 episodes to new additions on re-used episodes as specials)
- Original video animation

Raven Tengu Kabuto: The Golden-Eyed Beast
- Directed by: Buichi Terasawa
- Produced by: Junko Itou; Keito Nakamura; Kenji Toyota; Hiroshi Iwakawa
- Written by: Buichi Terasawa
- Music by: Seikou Nagaoka
- Studio: Hero Communications; Nakamura Production
- Licensed by: US Renditions (defunct)
- Released: July 24, 1992
- Runtime: 45 minutes

Karasu Tengu Kabuto (鴉天狗カブト; lit. 'Crow Goblin Kabuto') is a Japanese manga series written and illustrated by Buichi Terasawa in 1987.

== Plot ==
Those who have the blood of the Karasu Tengu (Crow Goblin) in their veins must forever fight against the powers of darkness. Along with four other holy ninja warriors Genbu (Black Snaky Tortoise), Suzaku (Red Phoenix), Seiryu (Blue Dragon), Byakko (White Tiger), Karasu Tengu Kabuto fights against the evil god Kuroyasha (Black Night Demon) Dôki and his underlings such as Junin-shu (Top Ten Warriors). Their battle continues through generations: in the second volume of the manga, Kabuto's son makes an appearance as the second Karasu Tengu.

== Media ==
=== Manga ===
The manga has been serialized in Shueisha's Fresh Jump in 1987–1988, and later published in the United States by ComicsOne (as Kabuto in 2001),

=== Anime ===
The manga was later adapted into the 39-episode anime series written by Hideki Mitsui and directed by Gen Fukuda and Takashi Watanabe in 1990–1991, premiering on NHK BS-2 on July 29, 1990. There were also six special episodes.

Episodes 14 to 26, which tell an anime-original storyline, have never been released on home video, even in Japan. Episodes 1 to 13, which cover Volume 1 of the manga, & Episodes 27 to 39, which cover Volume 2, were released on VHS & LD, both in their original episode forms & via four compilation movies, but the middle portion of the anime only ever aired on TV.

=== Original video animation ===
An OVA, Raven Tengu Kabuto: The Golden-Eyed Beast (鴉天狗カブト 黄金の目のケモノ, Karasu Tengu Kabuto: Ôgon no me no Kemono), was released in 1992. It was released in the U.S. on VHS as Kabuto the Golden Eye Monster by US Renditions in 1992.
