= Golden Films =

American animation studio

- Founded: 1990 (as American Film Investment Corporation); 1994 (as Golden Films)
- Founder: Diane Eskenazi
- Headquarters: Los Angeles, California, U.S.
- Website: www.goldenfilms.com

Golden Films is an American animation studio and production company headquartered in Los Angeles, California and founded in 1990 by Diane Eskenazi, known as American Film Investment Corporation for its first four years in business. The studio has produced a variety of animated shortfilms including the Enchanted Tales series, which were originally distributed by Sony, and a series of well known specials for Hallmark.

The Enchanted Tales series is based on fairy tales and classic literature, most of which had already been made into animated features by Disney. This prompted Disney to sue one of Golden Films' distributors after a string of Disney Renaissance-era films ended up in direct competition with Golden Films' productions on the home video market. As both Disney and Golden Films had relied on the same public domain source material, Disney ultimately lost the case. The Golden Films library also uses classical music and over 200 original songs. Production of new animated content ceased in 2004, but these films are still licensed to TV networks and other distributors.

In 2021, after a 17-year production hiatus, Golden Films began collaborating with another company called Peace Builders to produce live-action documentaries known as the One World series.

== Works ==
Golden Films has produced over 90 films and series which include the Enchanted Tales series of animated films which Golden Films produced for Sony. Golden Films also created and produced the animated series King Arthur and the Knights of Justice.

In 2021, Golden Films began working with Peace Builders to produce a collection of sociopolitical short films known as the One World series, created by international ambassadors representing Generation Z. These include the original One World miniseries, which celebrates ethnic diversity; We Rise, which presents methods of coping with stress and anxiety; Call for Peace, which concerns the Russo-Ukrainian War; and Code Red Planet Earth, which discusses the effects of and potential solutions to climate change.

== Distribution ==
Golden Films' productions have been distributed by a variety of distributors. In the United States, distributors have included Sony Wonder, Columbia TriStar, Cartoon Network, and Hallmark. International distributors include BBC, Universal, Grupo Planeta and, formerly, PolyGram. Other distribution partners include Amazon, Tubi, Pluto TV, Comcast, Apple TV, Roku and many other streaming platforms.
