= 1993 in anime =

The events of 1993 in anime.

== Accolades ==
At the Mainichi Film Awards, Patlabor 2: The Movie won the Animation Film Award. Internationally, Porco Rosso won the award for best feature film at the Annecy International Animated Film Festival.

== Releases ==
=== TV series ===
A list of 16 anime television series that debuted between January 1 and December 31, 1993.

Released	Title	Episodes	Director	Studio	Ref
January 8 – December 24	Miracle☆Girls	51	By episode: Takashi Anno (1–17); Hiroko Tokita (30–51)	Japan Taps	
January 17 – December 19	Wakakusa Monogatari: Nan to Jo-sensei (Little Women II: Jo's Boys)	40	Kōzō Kusuba	Nippon Animation	
January 25 – July 19	Musekinin Kanchou Tylor (The Irresponsible Captain Tylor)	26	Kōichi Mashimo	Tatsunoko Production	
January 30 – January 24, 1994	Yuusha Tokkyuu Might Gaine (The Brave Empress Might Gain)	47	Shinji Takamatsu	Sunrise	
March 3 – February 23, 1994	Nekketsu Saikyou Go-Saurer (Hot-Blooded Strongest Go-Saurer)	51	Toshifumi Kawase	Sunrise	
March 6 – March 12, 1994	Sailor Moon R	43	Junichi Sato	Toei Animation	
April 2 – March 25, 1994	Mobile Suit Victory Gundam	51	Yoshiyuki Tomino	Sunrise	
April 6 – March 29, 1994	Shippuu! Iron Leaguer	52	Tetsurō Amino	Sunrise	
April 9 – April 1, 1994	Kenyuu Densetsu Yaiba (Legendary Brave Swordsman Yaiba)	52	Norihiko Suto (Chief) Kunihiko Yuyama	Pastel	
April 10 –	Ninjaboy Rantaro	–	Tsutomu Shibayama	Ajia-do Animation Works	
April 10 – March 6, 1994	GS Mikami	45	Atsutoshi Umezawa	Toei Animation	
May 7 – March 6, 1994	Dragon League	39	Episodic: Kunitoshi Okajima Animation: Mitsuo Shindou	–	
September 4 – August 26, 1994	Muka Muka Paradise	51	Katsuyoshi Yatabe	Nippon Animation	
October 16 – March 23, 1996	Slam Dunk	101	Nobutaka Nishizawa	Toei Animation	
November 7 – December 25, 1994	Aoki Densetsu Shoot! (Blue Legend Shoot!)	58	Daisuke Nishio	Toei Animation	
December 13 – March 31, 2008	Shima Shima Tora no Shimajirou	726	Hisayuki Toriumi	Studio Kikan	

=== Movies ===
A list of 24 anime movies that debuted between January 1 and December 31, 1993

Released	Title	Director	Studio	Ref
January 25	Ramayana: Rama Ouji Densetsu (Ramayana: The Legend of Prince Rama)	Koichi Sasaki, Ram Mohan, Yugo Sako	TEM Co., Ltd., Nippon Ramayana Film Co., Ltd.	
March 6	Doragon Bōru Zetto Moetsukiro!! Nessen Ressen Chō-Gekisen (Dragon Ball Z: Broly – The Legendary Super Saiyan)	Shigeyasu Yamauchi	Toei Animation	
March 6	Doraemon: Nobita to Buriki no Rabirinsu (Doraemon: Nobita and the Tin Labyrinth)	Tsutomu Shibayama	Asatsu; Shin-Ei Animation	
March 6	Dorami-chan: Hello Kyouryuu Kids!! (Dorami-chan: Hello, Dynosis Kids!!)	Keiichi Hara	Asatsu; Shin-Ei Animation	
March 6	Dr. Slump & Arale-chan Ncha! Penguin Mura wa Hare no chi Hare (Dr. Slump and Arale-chan: N-cha! Clear Skies Over Penguin Village)	Keiichi Hara	Toei Animation	
March 13	Kappa no Sanpei (Kappa: A River Goblin and Sampei)	Toshio Hirata	Takahashi Studio	
March 13	Kidō Senshi SD Gundam Matsuri (Mobile Suit SD Gundam Festival)	Takashi Imanishi (Part 1), Tetsuro Amino (Parts 2 & 3)	Sunrise	
March 18	Sangokushi (dai 2-bu): Chōkō Moyu! (Romance of the Three Kingdoms (Part 2): The Yangtze River Burns!)	Tomoharu Katsumata	Enoki Films	
June 5	Jūbē Ninpūchō (Ninja Scroll)	Yoshiaki Kawajiri	Madhouse	
July 10	Doragon Bōru Zetto: Ginga Giri-Giri!! Butchigiri no Sugoi Yatsu (Dragon Ball Z: Bojack Unbound)	Yoshihiro Ueda	Toei Animation	
July 10	Dr. Slump & Arale-chan Ncha! Penguin Mura yori Ai o Komete (Dr. Slump and Arale-chan: N-cha! From Penguin Village with Love)	Mitsuo Hashimoto	Toei Animation	
July 10	O-Hoshisama no Rail (Rail of the Star)	Toshio Hirata	Madhouse	
July 17	Soreike! Anpanman: Kyōryū Nosshī no Daibōken (Let's Go! Anpanman: Nosshi the Dinosaur's Big Adventure)	Akinori Nagaoka	Tokyo Movie Shinsha	
July 24	Kureyon Shinchan: Akushon Kamen tai Haigure Maō (Crayon Shin-chan: Action Kamen vs Leotard Devil)	Mitsuru Hongo	Shin-Ei Animation; TV Asahi; ADK	
July 24	Rokudenashi Burūsu 1993 (Rokudenashi Blues 1993)	Hiroyuki Kakudō	Toei Animation	
August 7	Kidō Keisatsu Patoreibā 2: Za Mūbī (Patlabor 2: The Movie)	Mamoru Oshii	Production I.G	
August 14	San-chōme no Tama: Onegai! Momo-chan o Sagashite!! (Tama of 3rd Street: Please! Search for Momo-chan!!)	Hitoshi Nanba	Group TAC	
September 25	Biggu Wōzu: Kami Utsu Akaki Kōya ni (Big Wars: Red Zone, Divine Annihilation)	Toshifumi Takizawa, Issei Kume	Magic Bus	
November 13	Bonobono	Mikio Igarashi, Yūji Mutō (animation)	Group TAC	
December 5	Gekijō-ban Bishōjo Senshi Sērā Mūn R (Sailor Moon R: The Movie)	Kunihiko Ikuhara	Toei Animation	
December 18	Aoi Kioku: Manmō Kaitaku to Shōnen-tachi (Blue Memory: Manmo Pioneers and Boys)	Satoshi Dezaki	Magic Bus	
December 18	Ginga Eiyū Densetsu: Arata Naru Tatakai no Jokyoku (Ōvuachua) (Legend of the Galactic Heroes: Overture to a New War)	Noboru Ishiguro, Keizou Shimizu	Magic Bus; Kitty Film Mitaka Studio	
December 19	Kū: Tōi Umi kara Kita Kū (Coo: Tōi Umi kara Kita Coo)	Tetsuo Imazawa	Toei Animation	
December 26	Mother: Saigo no Shōjo Eve (E.Y.E.S. of Mars)	Iku Suzuki	Toei Animation	

=== OVA releases ===
A list of 18 original video animations that debuted between January 1 and December 31, 1993.

Released	Title	Episodes	Director	Studio	Ref
	Rei Rei	2	Yoshisuke Yamaguchi	Aubeck, AIC, KSS, Pink Pineapple	
January 1	Koronbusu no Daibōken (Columbus's Great Adventures)	1	Yorifusa Yamaguchi	SPO, AB Productions	
January 22	Offside	1	Takao Yotsuji, Hisashi Abe	Sakatsu Suzuki, Shigetoshi Tanaka	
January 25	Aru Kararu no Isan (Al Caral's Legacy)	1	Kōichi Ishiguro	Animate Film, Tokuma Japan Communications, Visual '80	
February 2 – May 17, 1994	Oh My Goddess!	5	Hiroaki Gōda	AIC	
February 25 – November 25	Moldiver	6	Hirohide Fujiwara	AIC; Pioneer LDC	
March 26 – May 28	Dragon Half	2	Shinya Sadamitsu	Production I.G.	
April 1 – December 21, 1997	Kyou kara Ore wa!!	10	Takeshi Mori Masami Annō	Pierrot	
April 25	Suna no Bara (Desert Rose) – Yuki no Mokushiroku (Desert Rose ~ The Snow Apocalypse)	1	Yasunao Aoki	J.C. Staff	
June 21 – August 21	Battle Angel	2	Hiroshi Fukutomi	Madhouse	
July 23 – January 25, 1998	Giant Robo: The Day the Earth Stood Still	7	Yasuhiro Imagawa	Mu Animation Studio; Phoenix Entertainment	
July 23	Mellow	1	Teruo Kogure	Knack Productions	
August 27	Dochinpira (The Gigolo - Dochinpira)	1	Hiromitsu Ōta	Studio Kikan, Studio Marine	
September 24	Mermaid's Scar	1	Morio Asaka	Madhouse	
September 25	Yōseiki Suikoden – Masei Kōrin (Suikoden Demon Century)	1	Hiroshi Negishi	J.C. Staff	
October 21 – October 21, 1994	New Dominion Tank Police	6	Norubu Furuse	J.C.Staff	
November 19 – November 18, 1994 (first run)	JoJo no Kimyou na Bouken	6 (first run)	Hiroyuki Kitakubo	A.P.P.P.	
December 17 – September 23, 1994	Please Save My Earth	6	Kazuo Yamazaki	Production I.G	
December 21 – December 16, 2011	Black Jack	12	Osamu Dezaki By episode: Satoshi Kuwahara (11); Masayoshi Nishida (12)	Tezuka Productions	

== See also ==
- 1993 in animation
