= 1993 in animation =

1993 in animation is an overview of notable events, including notable awards, list of films released, television show debuts and endings, and notable deaths.

== Events ==
=== January ===
- January 1: The first episode of The Adventures of Blinky Bill airs.
- January 6: The first episode of The Animals of Farthing Wood airs.

=== February ===
- February 7: The Flintstones’ TV movie I Yabba-Dabba Do! premieres. It takes place in a later timeline where Pebbles Flintstone and Bamm-Bamm Rubble are grown adults getting married.
- February 16: Count Duckula airs its final episode.
- February 28: The first episode of Bonkers airs.

=== March ===
- March 8: The first episode of Beavis and Butt-Head is broadcast.
- March 16: The first episode of Albert the 5th Musketeer is broadcast.
- March 29: 65th Academy Awards:
  - Mona Lisa Descending a Staircase by Joan C. Gratz wins the Academy Award for Best Animated Short.
  - "A Whole New World" from Aladdin by Tim Rice and Alan Menken wins the Academy Award for Best Original Song while its entire soundtrack wins the Academy Award for Best Original Score.

=== May ===
- May 28: Filmation's final project, Happily Ever After, finally releases after the four year hiatus due to distribution problems after Filmation's closure. The film was poorly received for its limited creativity and animation quality, and gained some notoriety for having African-American singer Irene Cara to take the voicing role as the titular character.
- May 13: The Simpsons concludes its fourth season on Fox with the episode "Krusty Gets Kancelled".

=== June ===
- June 18: The film Once Upon a Forest premieres, but flops at the box office.

=== September ===
- September 5: The first episode of 2 Stupid Dogs airs.
- September 6: The first episode of Adventures of Sonic the Hedgehog airs. It was originally planned to be a Saturday morning series, but got rejected by ABC and became a weekday series for syndication instead.
- September 11: The first episode of SWAT Kats: The Radical Squadron airs.
- September 13: The first episode of Animaniacs premieres on Fox Kids.
- September 18:
  - The first episodes of Biker Mice from Mars and Rocko's Modern Life premiere in Syndication (Biker Mice) & on Nickelodeon (Rocko).
  - The first episode of Sonic the Hedgehog airs. It gained a cult following and is acclaimed for its unexpected storylines in a Saturday morning cartoon of its time.
  - Season 6 of Garfield and Friends begins on CBS with the premiere of the following episodes:
    - "A Vacation From His Senses/The Incredibly Stupid Swamp Monster/Dread Giveaway"
    - "The Wright Stuff/Orson Express/Safe at Home"
- September 23: The Thief and the Cobbler by Richard Williams is released after being in production for a record-breaking 30 years. Unfortunately, it was not well-received due to the changes made after Williams lost all rights of the film in 1992. It would not be released in the US until 1995 when Miramax Films retains its distribution rights while editing the film further, which became a critical failure and is since regarded to be an insult to Richard Williams.
- September 30: Season 5 of The Simpsons begins on Fox with the premiere of the episode "Homer's Barbershop Quartet".

=== October ===
- October 7: The Simpsons episode "Cape Feare" premieres on Fox. Sideshow Bob officially begins his obsession for killing Bart in this episode.
- October 10: A five-year-old boy, Austin Matthews, sets fire to his mother's mobile home in Moraine, Ohio, killing his two-year-old sister Jessica. The mother claims that her son got the idea from watching Beavis and Butt-Head. Although it is later revealed that the family did not have cable television and thus could not watch the show, the controversy led to Beavis and Butt-Head being rescheduled to air later in the evenings and be edited to remove all references to fire.
- October 21: During a U.S. Senate hearing, chairman of the Senate Commerce, Science and Transportation Committee Ernest Fritz Hollings, argues that TV broadcasters have to be pressured to curb violent or otherwise offensive shows, making direct reference to Beavis and Butt-Head. However, he is ridiculed for mispronouncing the characters' names as Buffcoat and Beaver and admitting that he had never watched the show.
- October 28: The Simpsons' "Treehouse of Horror IV" premieres on Fox.
- October 29: Henry Selick's The Nightmare Before Christmas is released. It becomes a cult classic and an unexpected phenomenon on every Halloween.

=== November ===
- November 6: Garfield and Friends concludes its sixth season on CBS with the following episodes:
  - "Knights and Daze/Holiday Happening/Jailbird Jon"
  - "The Third Penelope Episode/Hare Force/Garfield's Garbage Can and Tin Pan Alley Revue"
- November 14: The Rugrats episode "Angelica Breaks a Leg" premieres on Nickelodeon.
- November 24: Dick Zondag, Ralph Zondag, Phil Nibbelink and Simon Wells's We're Back! A Dinosaur's Story is released.

=== December ===
- December 5: Hollyrock-a-Bye Baby, the sequel to I Yabba-Dabba Do!, premieres. Its availability became limited years after the initial broadcast due to regarding some of its mature subject matter.
- December 21: The first episode of VeggieTales airs.
- December 22: Tex Avery's Magical Maestro is added to the National Film Registry.
- December 25: The film Batman: Mask of the Phantasm is first released.
- December 26: Nick Park's Wallace and Gromit short film The Wrong Trousers is released.

=== Specific date unknown ===
- Digital Domain is founded.
- Rita Street establishes the organization Women in Animation.
- Dan Povenmire & Jeff "Swampy" Marsh conceived & created Phineas and Ferb, and they spend the next 13 years trying to pitch the show to various TV networks, until getting it greenlit by Disney for Disney Channel in 2006.

== Films released ==
- January 1 - Columbus's Great Adventures (Japan)
- January 16 - Special Gag Force Robot Twins (South Korea)
- January 22 - Offside (Japan)
- January 25 - Al Caral's Legacy (Japan)
- February 10 - The 1001 Gags of Spiff and Hercules (France)
- February 24 - Dragon Ball Z: The History of Trunks (Japan)
- March 6:
  - Doraemon: Nobita and the Tin Labyrinth (Japan)
  - 'Dragon Ball Z: Broly – The Legendary Super Saiyan (Japan)
- March 12 - Opera Imaginaire (France)
- March 13 - Mobile Suit SD Gundam Festival (Japan)
- March 18 - Sangokushi (dai 2-bu): Chōkō Moyu! (Japan)
- April 25 - Desert Rose ~ The Snow Apocalypse (Japan)
- May 5 - Ocean Waves (Japan)
- June 5 - Ninja Scroll (Japan)
- June 18 - Once Upon a Forest (United States and United Kingdom)
- July 10:
  - Dragon Ball Z: Bojack Unbound (Japan)
  - Rail of the Star (Japan)
- July 17 - Soreike! Anpanman Kyōryū Nosshī no Daibōken (Japan)
- July 23:
  - Lupin III: Voyage to Danger (Japan)
  - Mellow (Japan)
- July 24:
  - Crayon Shin-chan: Action Kamen vs Leotard Devil (Japan)
  - Rokudenashi Blues 1993 (Japan)
- July 31 - Fatal Fury 2: The New Battle (Japan)
- August 7 - Patlabor 2: The Movie (Japan)
- August 14 - Tama of 3rd Street: Please! Search for Momo-chan!! (Japan)
- August 27 - The Gigolo - Dochinpira (Japan)
- September 23 - The Thief and the Cobbler (United States, United Kingdom, and Canada)
- September 24 - Mermaid's Scar (Japan)
- September 25:
  - Big Wars: Red Zone, Divine Annihilation (Japan)
  - Suikoden Demon Century (Japan)
- October 2 - The Halloween Tree (United States)
- October 29 - The Nightmare Before Christmas (United States)
- November 13 - Bonobono (Japan)
- November 24 - We're Back! A Dinosaur's Story (United States)
- December 3 - Oishinbo: Nichibei Kome Sensō (Japan)
- December 5 - Sailor Moon R: The Movie (Japan)
- December 10:
  - David Copperfield (Canada)
  - Go Hugo Go (Denmark)
  - The Secret Adventures of Tom Thumb (United Kingdom)
- December 18:
  - Blue Memory: Manmo Pioneers and Boys (Japan)
  - Legend of the Galactic Heroes: Overture to a New War (Japan)
- December 19 - Coo: Tōi Umi kara Kita Coo (Japan)
- December 23 - Art of Fighting (Japan)
- December 25 - Batman: Mask of the Phantasm (United States)
- December 26 - E.Y.E.S. of Mars (Japan)
- December 29 - Street Fighter (South Korea)
- Specific date unknown:
  - The Cat's Mill (Latvia)
  - The Fantastic Voyages of Sinbad (Australia)
  - The History of the Wonderful World (Denmark)
  - Mafalda (Cuba and Spain)
  - Puss in Boots (Australia)
  - Thumbelina (Australia)

== Television series debuts ==
Date	Title	Channel	Year
January 1	The Adventures of Blinky Bill	Australian Broadcasting Corporation, Seven Network, ABC Kids	1993–2004
January 6	The Animals of Farthing Wood	BBC One, Children's BBC	1993–1995
February 28	Bonkers	The Disney Channel, CBS, Syndication	1993–1994
March 8	Beavis and Butt-Head	MTV	1993–1997; 2011; 2022-present
June 23	Family Dog	CBS	1993
September 1	The Bots Master	Syndication	1993–1994
September 1	Mighty Max	Syndication	1993–1994
September 5	2 Stupid Dogs	TBS, Syndication	1993–1995
September 5	Super Secret Secret Squirrel	TBS, Syndication	1993
September 6	Adventures of Sonic the Hedgehog	Syndication	1993–1996
September 10	The Legends of Treasure Island	CITV	1993–1995
September 11	Droopy, Master Detective	Fox Kids	1993
September 11	SWAT Kats: The Radical Squadron	TBS	1993–1995
September 11	The Pink Panther	Syndication	1993–1995
September 12	Hurricanes	Syndication	1993–1997
September 12	Double Dragon	Syndication	1993–1994
September 12	Madeline	The Family Channel	1993–1994
September 13	Animaniacs	Fox Kids	1993–1998
September 14	Meena	Bangladesh television	1993–2010
September 18	Biker Mice from Mars	Syndication	1993–1996
September 18	Exosquad	Syndication	1993–1994
September 18	Cro	ABC	1993–1994
September 18	Sonic the Hedgehog	ABC	1993–1994
September 18	Tales from the Cryptkeeper	ABC	1993–1999
September 18	Rocko's Modern Life	Nickelodeon	1993–1996
September 18	All-New Dennis the Menace	CBS	1993
September 18	Cadillacs and Dinosaurs	CBS	1993–1994
September 18	Marsupilami (1993)	CBS	1993
September 18	The New Adventures of Speed Racer	Syndication	1993
September 22	Avenger Penguins	CITV	1993–1994
October 31	Problem Child	USA Network	1993–1994
November 26	The Moxy Show	Cartoon Network	1993–2000
December 5	Twinkle, the Dream Being	Syndication	1993–1994
December 21	VeggieTales	DVD, TBN	1993–2015

== Television series endings ==
Date	Title	Channel	Year	Notes
May 23	The Pirates of Dark Water	ABC, Syndication	1991–1993	Cancelled
June 25	The Legend of Prince Valiant	The Family Channel	1991–1993	Cancelled
June 28	Stunt Dawgs	Syndication	1992–1993	Cancelled
June 29	Saban's Gulliver's Travels	Syndication	1992–1993	Cancelled
July 28	Family Dog	CBS	1993	Cancelled
October 10	American Heroes & Legends	Showtime	1992–1993	Cancelled
November 6	The Addams Family (1992)	ABC	1992–1993	Cancelled
November 22	Conan the Adventurer (1992)	Syndication	1992–1993	Cancelled
November 22	Mr. Bogus	Syndication	1991–1993	Cancelled
November 28	Super Secret Secret Squirrel	TBS, Syndication	1993	Cancelled
December 4	Tom & Jerry Kids	Fox Kids	1990–1993	Cancelled
December 4	Wild West C.O.W.-Boys of Moo Mesa	ABC	1992–1992	Cancelled
December 4	Droopy, Master Detective	Fox Kids	1993	Cancelled
December 11	Marsupilami (1993)	CBS	1993	Cancelled
December 11	All-New Dennis the Menace	CBS	1993	Cancelled
Unknown	Super Dave: Daredevil for Hire	Fox Kids	1992–1993	

== Television season premieres ==
Date	Title	Season	Channel
May 17	Beavis and Butt-Head	2	MTV
September 6	Beavis and Butt-Head	3	MTV
September 26	Doug	4	Nickelodeon
September 26	Rugrats	3	Nickelodeon
September 30	The Simpsons	5	Fox
November 20	The Ren & Stimpy Show	3	Nickelodeon

== Television season finales ==
Date	Title	Season	Channel
March 25	Beavis and Butt-Head	1	MTV
May 13	The Simpsons	4	Fox
May 23	The Ren & Stimpy Show	2	Nickelodeon
May 23	Rugrats	2	Nickelodeon
July 11	Doug	3	Nickelodeon
July 15	Beavis and Butt-Head	2	MTV

== Births ==
=== January ===
- January 1: Xavier Pritchett, American former child actor (voice of the title character in Little Bill).
- January 4: Aaryn Doyle, Canadian actress (voice of Foo in The Save-Ums!, Pansy in Miss Spider's Sunny Patch Friends).
- January 18: Mitra Jouhari, American comedian, actress, and writer (voice of Sorority Girl #1 in Big Mouth, Nurse Denise in Ten Year Old Tom, Saltine in Digman!, Cleopatra in Clone High (2023), Waiter in the Human Resources episode "International Creature Convention").

=== February ===
- February 6: Tinashe, American singer and actress (portrayed Robin Wheeler in Out of Jimmy's Head, voice of Leilani Makani in the Rocket Power episode "Island of the Menhune", On Ji in the Avatar: The Last Airbender episode "The Headband").

=== March ===
- March 4: Zach Hadel, American voice actor, internet personality, animator, storyboard artist (SpongeBob SquarePants), writer and director (co-creator and voice of Charlie, Glep and other various characters in Smiling Friends).
- March 7: Sarah Sherman, American actress, comedian and screenwriter (voice of Coriander Cadaverish in Nimona, Water Tower in the Severance episode "Hello, Ms. Cobel", Crimson Haste in Hamster & Gretel, Carmela in Primos, Lulu in Magical Girl Friendship Squad).

=== April ===
- April 4: Daniela Bobadilla, Canadian actress (voice of Miss Martian in Justice League vs. the Fatal Five, Mist in Young Justice).
- April 10: Sofia Carson, American actress and singer (voice of Evie in the Descendants franchise, Keemia Marko/Sandgirl in Spider-Man, Maliga in Elena of Avalor, Pipp Petals in My Little Pony: A New Generation).
- April 15: Madeleine Martin, American actress (voice of the title character in JoJo's Circus, Fionna in Adventure Time, additional voices in Ice Age: The Meltdown).

=== May ===
- May 10: Spencer Fox, American musician, singer, and former child actor (voice of Dash Parr in The Incredibles, Jim and Tim Possible in season 4 of Kim Possible).
- May 13: Debby Ryan, American actress and singer-songwriter (voice of Jessie Prescott in the Ultimate Spider-Man episode "Halloween Night at the Museum", Krista in Velma, Spike in Secret of the Wings, Thumbelina in the Goldie & Bear episode "Thumbelina's Wild Ride", Actress in the Kevin episode "Animal of the Month").
- May 14: Miranda Cosgrove, American actress (voice of Margo in the Despicable Me franchise, Kon Suay in Khan Kluay, Samantha in A Mouse Tale, Miranda Wright in the What's New, Scooby-Doo? episode "A Terrifying Round with a Menacing Metallic Clown", Sarah in the Lilo & Stitch: The Series episode "Morpholomew").

=== June ===
- June 7: Amanda Leighton, American actress (voice of Blossom in The Powerpuff Girls, Polly Plantar in Amphibia, Poppy in Trolls: The Beat Goes On! and Trolls: TrollsTopia, Angelbit in Unikitty!, Angela in Solar Opposites, Kristine Sanchez in Hailey's On It!).
- June 20: Adam Taylor Gordon, American former child actor (voice of Charlie Brown in I Want a Dog for Christmas, Charlie Brown).
- June 26: Ariana Grande, American singer, songwriter, and actress (voice of Princess Diaspro in Winx Club, the title character in Snowflake, the White Gorilla, Laura in Underdogs, Italian daughter in the Family Guy episode "Mom's the Word").
- June 29: Oliver Tree, American musician (voice of Zane in the Royal Crackers episode "Craftopia"), (d. 2026).

=== July ===
- July 6: Fairouz Ai, Japanese voice actress (voice of Hibiki Sakura in How Heavy Are the Dumbbells You Lift?, Jolyne Cujoh in JoJo's Bizarre Adventure: Stone Ocean, Manatsu Natsuumi / Cure Summer in Tropical-Rouge! Pretty Cure).
- July 10: Carla Jeffery, American actress (voice of Mania in the Spider-Man episode "Maximum Venom", Bree in the Zombies franchise), (d. 2026).
- July 26: Elizabeth Gillies, American actress (voice of Daphne in Winx Club, Catwoman in Catwoman: Hunted, Parana Sycamore in the Welcome to the Wayne episode "That's Squidjit Bowling").

=== August ===
- August 1: Leon Thomas III, American actor (singing voice of Tyrone in seasons 2 and 3 of The Backyardigans).
- August 11: Alyson Stoner, American actor (voice of Isabella Garcia-Shapiro in Phineas and Ferb, Sam Sharp in The Loud House, Destructress in Hamster & Gretel, Opal in The Legend of Korra, Batgirl in Young Justice, Florina in the Voltron: Legendary Defender episode "Depths").
- August 16: Cameron Monaghan, American actor (voice of Superboy in Reign of the Supermen, Poi and Ping in the Avatar: The Last Airbender episode "The Fortuneteller", Andy in the Shorty McShorts' Shorts episode "Flip Flopped").
- August 24: Aoi Koga, Japanese voice actress (voice of Sora Kaneshiro in Angel's 3Piece!, Yuri Miyata in Two Car, Kaguya Shinomiya in Kaguya-sama: Love Is War, Shoko Komi in Komi Can't Communicate).
- August 26: Keke Palmer, American actress (voice of Peaches in the Ice Age franchise, Aisha in Winx Club, Izzy Hawthorne in Lightyear, Rochelle Hillhurst in Big Mouth and Human Resources, Maya Leibowitz-Jenkins in The Proud Family: Louder and Prouder, Brandi in The Cleveland Show episode "Harder, Better, Faster, Browner", Pam in the Family Guy episode "Baby Got Black", Stylee in the Bubble Guppies episode "Guppy Style!", Fraülen Hapstein in the Robot Chicken episode "Musya Shakhtyorov in: Honeyboogers").
- August 28: Sora Amamiya, Japanese voice actress, singer and YouTuber (voice of Elizabeth Liones in The Seven Deadly Sins, Touka Kirishima in Tokyo Ghoul, Asseylum Vers Allusia in Aldnoah.Zero, Chizuru Mizuhara in Rent-A-Girlfriend, Akame in Akame ga Kill!, Aqua in KonoSuba, Isla in Plastic Memories, Mayuri in Date A Live: Mayuri Judgement, Hitomi Uzaki in Killing Bites, Miia in Monster Musume, Ayame Himuro in Science Fell in Love, So I Tried to Prove It, Miko Yotsuya in Mieruko-chan).
- August 29: Liam Payne, British singer (voice of B-Bot in Ron's Gone Wrong, himself in the Family Guy episode "Run, Chris, Run"), (d. 2024).

=== September ===
- September 7: Taylor Gray, American actor (voice of Ezra Bridger in Star Wars Rebels).
- September 15: James Street, American child actor (second voice of Huckleberry Pie in Strawberry Shortcake), (d. 2007).
- September 16: Tayla Parx, American singer, songwriter, and actress (voice of Victor Stone in Justice League: Gods and Monsters).
- September 18: Taran Kootenhayoo, Canadian actor (voice of Randall and Totem Raiser in Molly of Denali), (d. 2020).
- September 25: Zach Tyler Eisen, American former actor (voice of Aang in Avatar: The Last Airbender, Pablo in season 1 of The Backyardigans, Andrew Mulligan in Little Bill, Lucas in The Ant Bully, Baby Red Fish in the Dora the Explorer episode "Fish Out of Water").

=== October ===
- October 8: Molly Quinn, American actress (voice of Bloom in Winx Club, Supergirl in Superman: Unbound, Eunice in Ben 10: Ultimate Alien).
- October 25: Zeno Robinson, American voice actor (voice of Alan Albright in the Ben 10 franchise, Hunter in The Owl House, the Green Poncho in Craig of the Creek, Remy Remington in Big City Greens, Cyborg and Steel in Young Justice, Nino Lahiffe and Max Kanté in Miraculous: Tales of Ladybug & Cat Noir, Randy Robertson in Spider-Man, young King Andrias in the Amphibia episode "The Core & the King").

=== November ===
- November 6: Jak Knight, American television writer, producer (Big Mouth), actor and comedian (voice of DeVon, Tall Guy and Gina's Brother #2 in Big Mouth, Stiles in American Dad!), (d. 2022).
- November 19: Pete Davidson, American actor, comedian and writer (voice of Phineas T. Phreakers in The Freak Brothers, Mirage in Transformers: Rise of the Beasts, Toad Button in the American Dad episode "Viced Principal", Petey in Dog Man).
- November 22: Adèle Exarchopoulos, French actress (voice of Ennui in Inside Out 2).

=== December ===
- December 8: AnnaSophia Robb, American actress (voice of Tambi in Khumba, Dani Fenton in the Danny Phantom episode "Kindred Spirits", Yasmin in the Robot Chicken episode "Catdog on a Stick").
- December 17: Kiersey Clemons, American actor (voice of Dee Dee Skyes in Scoob!, Victoria in Michael Jackson's Halloween, Derica in Fairfax, Eliza in Praise Petey).
- December 19: Nik Dodani, American actor, writer, and comedian (voice of Randy Betancourt in Big Nate, Kardez in Strange World, Gavin in The Owl House episode "Through the Looking Glass Ruins").
- December 22: Meghan Trainor, American singer and songwriter (voice of Smurfmelody in Smurfs: The Lost Village, Fairy Godmother in Playmobil: The Movie, guest starred in the SpongeBob SquarePants episode "SpongeBob's Appreciation Day!").
- December 27: Olivia Cooke, English actress (voice of Georgia Nolan in Fireheart, Loch Ness Monster in the Axe Cop episode "Night Mission: The Extincter").
- December 28: Broti Gupta, Indian-American podcaster, television writer, and producer (The Simpsons).

=== Specified date unknown ===
- Jamie Loftus, American stand-up comedian, actress, writer and podcaster (voice of Nightscreamr in Magical Girl Friendship Squad, Melissa in Human Kind Of, Amy and Emily Malek in Robot Chicken).

== Deaths ==
=== February ===
- February 7: Nic Broca, Belgian animator and comics artist (Ovide and the Gang, The Snorks), dies at age 60.
- February 9: Jacques Verbeek, Dutch animator and comics artist (made animated films with Karin Wiertz), dies at age 46.
- February 21: Harvey Kurtzman, American comics artist, writer, publisher and animation scriptwriter (scripted Mad Monster Party? and animated shorts for Sesame Street), dies at age 68.

=== March ===
- March 3: Bill Draut, American comics artist and animator (G.I. Joe), dies at age 71.
- March 10: Vladimir Suteev, Russian children's writer, artist, animator, film director, screenwriter (China in Flames, Petya and Little Red Riding Hood, The Magic Store), dies at age 89.
- March 14: Larz Bourne, American animation writer (Famous Studios, Gene Deitch, Hanna-Barbera, DePatie-Freleng Enterprises, Terrytoons), dies at age 77.

=== April ===
- April 1: Jerry Hausner, American actor (voice of Waldo in Mr. Magoo, Hemlock Holmes, The Mole, Broodles and Itchy in The Dick Tracy Show), dies at age 83.
- April 19: Lee Blair, American artist (Walt Disney Animation Studios), dies at age 81.
- April 20:
  - Cantinflas, Mexican comedian, actor and filmmaker (voice of Amigo in Amigo and Friends), dies from lung cancer at age 81.
  - Charles Degotte, Belgian comics artist and animator (Dupuis), commits suicide at age 59.

=== May ===
- May 3: Hermína Týrlová, Czech animator, film director, and screenwriter, (directed Tajemství Lucerny (The Lantern's Secret) and Ferda Mravenec (Fernando the Ant)), dies at age 93.
- Specific date unknown: Renaud Mader, aka Mad, French comics artist and animator (Gaumont, Walt Disney Animation), dies at age 26.

=== June ===
- June 4: Georgy Millyar, Russian voice actor (voiced the Tsar in The Humpbacked Horse, Baba Yaga in The Frog Princess, and Koshchei in Beloved Beauty), dies at age 89.
- June 5: Michael P. Schoenbrun, American production manager (The Simpsons), dies at age 54.
- June 25: Arturo Moreno, Spanish comics artist and animator (Garbancito de la Mancha, Alegres vacaciones), dies at age 84.

=== July ===
- July 2: Dmitry Nalbandyan, Armenian animator and painter, dies at age 86.
- July 4: Roman Abelevich Kachanov, Russian animator (Cheburashka), dies at age 72.
- July 11: Mary Moder, American voice actress (voice of Fiddler Pig in Disney's Three Little Pigs shorts), dies at age 87.
- July 21: Robert Glass, American sound engineer (The Simpsons), was stabbed to death at age 53.
- July 26: Marcellite Garner, American voice actress (voiced Minnie Mouse in several cartoons), dies at age 83.

=== August ===
- August 1: Claire Du Brey, American actress (model of the Fairy Godmother in Cinderella), dies at age 100.

=== September ===
- September 9: David Tendlar, American animator and comics artist (Fleischer Studios, Famous Studios, Terrytoons, Hanna-Barbera), dies at age 84.
- September 10: Cal Howard, American animator, cartoon writer (Walter Lantz, Walt Disney Company, Fleischer Brothers, Ub Iwerks, Warner Bros. Cartoons, Screen Gems) and voice actor (voice of Gabby Goat in Get Rich Quick Porky, Prince David in Gulliver's Travels), dies at age 82.
- September 30: Carlo Vinci, American comics artist and animator (Van Beuren Studios, Terrytoons, MGM, Walt Disney Company, Hanna-Barbera), dies at age 87.

=== October ===
- October 13: Otmar Gutmann, German TV producer, animator and director (creator of Pingu), dies from cancer at age 56.
- October 16: Bonnie Poe, American voice actress (continued voice of Betty Boop), dies at age 81.
- October 25: Vincent Price, American actor (voice of January Q. Irontail in Here Comes Peter Cottontail, narrator in Vincent, Vincent Van Ghoul in The 13 Ghosts of Scooby-Doo, Ratigan in The Great Mouse Detective, Edgar Allan Poe in Tiny Toon Adventures, Zigzag in The Thief and the Cobbler), dies at age 82.

=== November ===
- November 15: Evelyn Venable, American actress (voice of the Blue Fairy in Pinocchio), dies at age 80.

=== December ===
- December 4: Frank Zappa, American rock artist and composer (voice of the Pope in The Ren & Stimpy Show episode "Powdered Toast Man", created background music for the first season of Duckman), dies from cancer at age 52.
- December 10: Roland Davies, English comics artist, animator, animation producer and painter (Roland Davies Films Ltd., animated cartoons based on Come On, Steve), dies at age 89.
- December 13: Ken Anderson, American art director and writer (Walt Disney Animation Studios), dies at age 84.
- December 25: Ann Ronell, American composer and lyricist (co-wrote Who's Afraid of the Big Bad Wolf), dies at age 88.
- December 30: Mack David, American lyricist and songwriter (Cinderella, Alice in Wonderland, The Bugs Bunny Show), dies at age 81.

=== Specific date unknown ===
- Nguyễn Xuân Khoát, Vietnamese composer, pianist and animator, dies at age 92 or 93.

== See also ==
- 1993 in anime
