= Tytania =

Novel series by Yoshiki Tanaka

- Original cover of the first volume.

タイタニア (Taitania)
- Genre: Space opera
- Novel series
- Written by: Yoshiki Tanaka
- Illustrated by: Katsumi Michihara (Tokuma Shoten); Haruhiko Mikimoto (Square Enix)
- Published by: Tokuma Shoten (former); Square Enix (current)
- Original run: December 31, 1988 – February 5, 2015
- Volumes: 5
- Manga
- Written by: Gantetsu
- Published by: Kodansha
- Magazine: Monthly Shōnen Sirius
- Original run: March 26, 2008 – October 26, 2011
- Volumes: 9
- Anime television series
- Directed by: Kōji Itō (Chief); Noboru Ishiguro
- Produced by: Eizō Kondō; Yukio Kikukawa; Satoshi Matsui; Hideaki Sakamoto; Kensaku Yamanaka; Masato Matsubayashi; Yōichi Ishimoto
- Written by: Ken'ichi Kanamaki
- Music by: Hiroshi Takaki
- Studio: Artland
- Licensed by: NA: Sentai Filmworks
- Original network: NHK-BS2
- Original run: October 9, 2008 – March 26, 2009
- Episodes: 26

Tytania (Japanese: タイタニア, Hepburn: Taitania) is a Japanese space opera novel series written by Yoshiki Tanaka between 1988 and 2015 and released in five volumes. The series is about people who try to liberate the galaxy from the rule of the Tytania-clan and seek refuge with a rebel force. It has been adapted into manga and anime in 2008–2011.

== Plot ==
In a future where mankind is scattered across the stars, the Empire of Valdana is under the control of the Tytania clan, which forged its influence through intimidation and economic might. In the year 446, Tytania dispatches a large fleet to seize a new piece of technology from the city-state of Euriya. Much to everyone's surprise, Euriya decides to resist and wins. Their isolated act of rebellion sets into motion a sequence of events that strains the careful alliances and treaties within the empire as various factions seek to exploit the situation to their own advantage. In the ensuing turmoil, ambitious members of the Tytania nobility begin moving against each other in an effort to settle old grievances and seize control of the clan. What started as an act of rebellion by Euriya, quickly expands into a civil war – with the wealth and power of the empire up for grabs to whoever is bold enough to seize it.

Meanwhile, Fan Hyulick, the man responsible for Euriya's victory, finds himself the target of an imperial manhunt, one he can only escape by continuing to fight an empire that controls entire worlds.

== Characters ==
=== Nobility ===
- Ajman Tytania (アジュマーン・タイタニア, Ajuman Taitania) Voiced by: Kenta Miyake

The "Landless Lord" Ajman Tytania is the current head of the Tytania clan.

- Jouslain Tytania (ジュスラン・タイタニア, Jyusuran Taitania) Voiced by: Daisuke Kishio

Jouslain Tytania is one of the four dukes in line to succeed Ajman Tytania as the clan's next Landless Lord. His flagship is the Austra.

- Idris Tytania (イドリス・タイタニア, Idorisu Taitania) Voiced by: Hiroyuki Yoshino

Idris Tytania is the youngest of the four Dukes in line for succeeding as the head of the clan. His flagship is the Fire Phoenix.

- Ariabert Tytania (アリアバート・タイタニア, Ariabato Taitania) Voiced by: Takashi Kondō

Ariabert Tytania is one of the four dukes in line to succeed Ajman Tytania as the head of the Tytania Clan. He commands the flagship Golden Sheep.

- Zarlisch Tytania (ザーリッシュ・タイタニア, Zarisshu Taitania) Voiced by: Taketora

Zarlisch Tytania is one of the four dukes in line to succeed Ajman Tytania as the head of the Tytania Clan. Zarlisch's flagship name is the Typhoon.

- Lydia (リディア, Ridia) Voiced by: Kaori Nazuka

Lydia is the second princess of the Elbing Kingdom. She currently resides on Uraniborg under the custody of Jouslain Tytania.

=== Resistance ===
- Fan Hyulick (ファン・ヒューリック, Fan Hyûrikku) Voiced by: Katsuyuki Konishi

Fan Hyulick is a former admiral of Euria, who inflicted the first defeat to the Tytania clan in 200 years.

- Lira Florenz (リラ・フローレンツ, Rira Furûrentsu) Voiced by: Sayuri Yahagi

Lira Florenz is part of the resistance force on Emmental seeking to restore the Principality of Casabianca.

- Miranda Casimir (ミランダ・カシミール, Miranda Kashimîru) Voiced by: Junko Minagawa

Miranda is part of the resistance force and princess to the Principality of Casabianca.

== Media ==
=== Novels ===
The first volume was published in 1988 by Tokuma Shoten under the Tokuma Novels imprint, but the series was discontinued after the third volume was released in 1991. More than 20 years later, volume 4 was finally published in September 2013. In the meantime, the series was republished by Square Enix under the EX Novels label. Additionally, starting in September 2008, a revised edition was released by Kodansha Bunko to coincide with the anime broadcast. After the anime concluded, a special limited edition compiling the three volumes—bundled with a DVD of the anime's first episode—was released by Kodansha Novels in April 2010.

Book List
| Title | Publication Date | ISBN |
|---|---|---|
| Gale Chapter (疾風篇, Shippū-hen) | December 31, 1988 | ISBN 4-19-153817-9 |
| Storm Chapter (暴風篇, Bōfū-hen) | November 30, 1989 | ISBN 4-19-154060-2 |
| Whirlwind Chapter (旋風篇, Senpū-hen) | May 31, 1991 | ISBN 4-19-154542-6 |
| Fierce Wind Chapter (烈風篇, Reppū-hen) | September 25, 2013 (began printing September 26, 2013) | ISBN 978-4-06-182890-2 |
| Terrifying Wind Chapter (凄風篇, Seifū-hen) | February 4, 2015 (began printing February 5, 2015) | ISBN 978-4-06-299042-4 |

=== Manga ===
| No. | Japanese release date | Japanese ISBN |
|---|---|---|
| 1 | September 22, 2008 | 978-4-06-373137-8 |
| 2 | February 23, 2009 | 978-4-06-373158-3 |
| 3 | June 23, 2009 | 978-4-06-373177-4 |
| 4 | October 23, 2009 | 978-4-06-373193-4 |
| 5 | June 23, 2010 | 978-4-06-376220-4 |
| 6 | February 9, 2011 | 978-4-06-376254-9 |
| 7 | July 8, 2011 | 978-4-06-376273-0 |
| 8 | November 9, 2011 | 978-4-06-376306-5 |
| 9 | December 9, 2011 | 978-4-06-376313-3 |

=== Anime ===
The anime adaptation of Tytania was produced by Artland and directed by Noboru Ishiguro. It aired on NHK's BS-2 satellite channel from October 9, 2008, to March 26, 2009.

== Reception ==
In September 2008, the series had 670,000 copies culminating of the Tokuma Novels version. And in January 2015, there were 15 million comics culminating.

The first part of the show (DVD vol. 1) was reviewed for Anime News Network, where the reviewer awarded the show a B score, writing that "the series definitely gets better as it delves more into the personalities and plot threads in play. Calling it a truly good series may be a stretch, but those who favor sci fi anime with a grand scope which includes action, but is not a slave to said action, may find this one to their liking". Another reviewer wrote that the show "can be summed up in five words: talkative pretty boys in space. You're either on board for this or you're not [...] Tytania is a surprisingly decent show compared to similar, more incoherent female fan service fare".

In The Encyclopedia of Science Fiction, the entry about the anime notes that "The reception [...] was muted. Reviewers praised the layered court politics and realistic, flawed characters, but faulted the slow pacing, uneven tone, generic worldbuilding, and cost-saving visuals. Comparisons with highly praised LoGH were inevitable and usually unfavorable: fans of Military SF were disappointed that space battles often reduce to capital ships trading beams rather than tactically staged set-pieces; Fan Hyulick feels similar but less compelling than LoGH's Yang Wen-li, and compounding these issues, the anime adapts only the opening arc of the novels, ending without closure – a familiar issue when animating unfinished prose sources. The problem was exacerbated by the prose cycle's long hiatus (early 1990s to 2013). Ishiguro reportedly hoped to continue once the books resumed, but his death in 2012 ended those prospects. Judged on its own terms, however, Tytania, while hardly a masterpiece, plays as a competent court-intrigue Space Opera (or at least its opening act).".
