= Ai no Kusabi =

Japanese novel and OVA series

- The Space Between
- The English first volume of the novel, subtitled Stranger

間の楔 (Ai no Kusabi)
- Genre: Science fiction; Yaoi
- Serial novel
- Written by: Rieko Yoshihara
- Illustrated by: Katsumi Michihara
- Published by: Koufuusha Shuppan
- English publisher: NA: Digital Manga Publishing
- Magazine: Shōsetsu June
- Original run: October 1987 – October 1990
- Volumes: 1 (original Kōfūsha edition); 6 (expanded Chara edition); 8 (International edition)
- Original video animation
- Directed by: Akira Nishimori; Katsuhito Akiyama
- Written by: Naoko Hasegawa
- Studio: AIC
- Released: August 1, 1992 – May 1, 1994
- Runtime: 60 minutes
- Episodes: 2
- Original video animation

Ai no Kusabi 2012
- Directed by: Katsuhito Akiyama
- Written by: Rieko Yoshihara
- Music by: Tetsuya Takahashi
- Studio: AIC
- Licensed by: NA: Media Blasters
- Released: January 18, 2012 – April 18, 2012
- Runtime: 60 minutes
- Episodes: 4

Ai no Kusabi (間の楔; lit. "The Space Between") is a Japanese novel written by Rieko Yoshihara. Originally serialized in the yaoi magazine Shōsetsu June between December 1986 and October 1987, the story was collected into a hardbound novel that was released in Japan in 1990, and eventually expanded on and released in 6 paperback volumes.

This futuristic tale takes place on a planet ruled by a super computer, Jupiter, where its cyborg creations, the Elites, who are assigned various social roles based on their hair color, rule over the human populace. Iason Mink, a high-class "Blondy" elite from the capital Tanagura, runs into Riki, a "Mongrel" from the slums, and makes him his "Pet". This decision was seen as taboo in Tanagura where Pets are a status symbol and are expected to be well-bred, and was also unacceptable to Riki who had his freedom taken away from him. As Riki learns of the dangers Iason faces by keeping him, he finds himself developing feelings for his master. While focusing on the relationship between Iason and Riki, Ai no Kusabi also explores issues of caste systems and social exclusion, as well as the implications of Artificial Intelligence ruling over a human society.

The novel was partially adapted into a two-episode original video animation (OVA) by Anime International Company (AIC), with the first episode released in August 1992 and the second in May 1994. In November 1993, an audio drama entitled Dark Erogenous was released focusing on a time period left unexplored in the original novels. A new twelve-episode OVA adaptation, also from AIC, was scheduled to begin releasing in Japan in the spring of 2010, but was cancelled for financial reasons. The project was picked up again and was released on January 18, 2012. However, the series was once again discontinued after four episodes.

The novel is licensed for an English language release in North America by Digital Manga Publishing, which published the novel over an eight-volume series.

== Plot ==
Ai no Kusabi takes place on the fictional planet of Amoi, ruled by the computer Jupiter, a product of unrestricted scientific research. Jupiter gains self awareness, overthrows its human creators and expels humans from Amoi's central city, Tanagura. It creates its own, improved, version of humanity – the cyborg Elites, entirely artificial, save their enhanced, organic brains.

The human population are relegated to Midas, Tanagura's satellite city. Jupiter imposes strict social norms on the entire society. Noram, the class system which is based on their hair colour, ranks the elites and assigned them specific social roles, and Zein which controlled and determined every facet of human life in Midas (and was not based on hair colour).

Human discontent toward Jupiter led to the Ceres Independence Rebellion, graciously allowed by Jupiter without bloodshed, but would prove to be pyrrhic. Ceres was cut off from the rest of Midas and no longer acknowledged by Tanagura, and was left to fend for itself – a task it failed to do. Eventually, the area descended into chaos and became a slum. Its denizens, now derided as slum mongrels, were viewed as the lowest class, abhorred by the rest of Midas. Ceres was no longer bound by Zein and unlike Midas, practiced natural reproduction, however for reasons unknown to them, the birthrate of boys was much greater than that of girls, which resulted in the skewed ratio where males outnumbered females 9 to 1.

The society of the elites, who enjoyed every luxury possible, put great value on social class. Pets, who were genetically engineered humans bred in various "production centers" in Midas, were kept by the elite for entertainment and served as status symbols. It was expected that the pedigree and rank of the pet would be appropriate to that of its elite owner, with Academy-produced pure bred pets reserved for the highest ranks – the 13 Blondies. As cyborgs with an artificial body, elites themselves had no interest in sex, however the pets were used for voyeuristic entertainment and were made to copulate with each other at so called "mating parties", as the elites observed. They were not viewed as having intrinsic value and were at complete mercy of their owners, to be treated as nothing more than pretty decorations to be discarded once they served their purpose.

Tending to both pets and the elites were "Furniture", castrated, adolescent boys viewed as nothing more than objects. They were "installed" in each elite's domicile and expected to take care of the home as well as their master's and pet's every need.

== Characters ==
=== Main ===
Riki (リキ)
Voiced by: Seki Toshihiko (1990s OVAs, Audio Book & first drama CD), Kentarō Itō (2012 OVAs & later drama CD) (Japanese); Darren Mitchell (English)
The primary protagonist of the series. Riki is a mongrel from Ceres and the former leader of his gang, Bison. Considered the "charisma of the slums", Riki was proud, rebellious, fierce, and defiant, known throughout the slums for his fiery nature and his striking appearance. Because of his unusual black hair and eyes, he was compared to Vajra, a mythical black beast. Before becoming Iason's pet, Riki's pairing partner was Guy, the second-in-command of Bison, but their relationship ended once Iason forced Riki to be his pet and did not recover even when Riki returned to the slums. Before being taken to Eos, he worked under Katze as a black market courier. Despite being the youngest in their ranks, at only 16, he proved himself to be capable, adaptable and clever, earning him the name "Riki the Dark".
But as a pet, Riki was anything but compliant. Throughout the story, Riki is torn between his pride and the feelings he has for Iason that he is unwilling to acknowledge.
Iason Mink (イアソン・ミンク, Iason Minku)
Voiced by: Kaneto Shiozawa (1990s OVAs, Audio Book & first drama CD), Tōru Ōkawa (2012 OVAs & later drama CD) (Japanese); Todd Haberkorn (English)
Iason is one of the central characters of Ai no Kusabi. He is a Blondy who functions as the head of the Market Intelligence Department and rules the Syndicate behind the black market. He has an elegant and calm demeanor that hides a passionate, ruthless, manipulative, and unforgiving nature. He is in love with his pet Riki, a mongrel from the slums, which casts a dark shadow over his seeming perfection. At first, Iason is interested in what it would be like to have a gang leader from the slums as a pet, instead of one of those non-thinking pets bred by the Academy, but slowly he begins to develop feelings for Riki to the point of obsession.
Guy (ガイ, Gai)
Voiced by: Kozima Takayuki (1990 drama CD), Kōji Tsujitani (1990s OVAs), Kōsuke Toriumi (2012 OVAs & later drama CD) (Japanese); Ricco Fajardo (English)
Riki's former pairing partner and his second-in-command in Bison. Guy and Riki had been together since their Guardian days and have been inseparable since. Calm, reasonable and collected, he was the counterweight to Riki's fiery impulsiveness. When Riki came back after his mysterious 3 year disappearance, Guy was reluctant to pry, respecting his privacy and giving him space, even if it meant that they were no longer partners. But after he caught a glimpse of what was really going on in Riki's life, and realising that Riki had been an unwilling slave to a Blondy for those years, he attempts to do whatever he can in order to retrieve Riki from Iason.
Katze (カッツェ, Kattse)
Voiced by: Hōchū Ōtsuka (1990 drama CD), Hideyuki Tanaka (1990s OVAs), Shin-ichiro Miki (2012 OVAs & later drama CD) (Japanese); Michael A. Zekas (English)
Iason's right-hand man in the black market. Unbeknownst to most, Katze used to be Iason's furniture. A computer genius, he almost uncovered what he calls the "Secrets of Tanagura" during his time as furniture, but was caught in the act by Iason, who punished him by slashing his left cheek, which earned him his trademark scar. Rather than dispose of him, Iason recognised the exceptional intelligence and capability of the boy, and put him to work on the black market.
Katze finds himself a reluctant bystander in the saga between Riki and Iason, and due to his role in both their lives, he has a front row seat to the unraveling of their lives and is frustrated at his inability to do anything. Despite his cool, seemingly uncaring nature, he cares for both Iason and Riki and tries his best to look after both of them.
Raoul Am (ラウール・アム, Rauru Amu)
Voiced by: Shō Hayami (1990s OVAs & first drama CD), Takaya Kuroda (2012 OVAs & later drama CD) (Japanese); Chuck Huber (English)
A Blondie who is the chief scientist of Tanagura, and Iason Mink's best friend. He serves as the voice of reason, concern and societal pressure as Iason's infatuation with Riki becomes more obvious.
Raoul is one of, if not the most prominent scientist in the known universe and because of his disregard for bioethics, as well as his capability to use his medical advances to cure entire worlds on a whim, is known as "the God killer". He is at the forefront of bioengineering and pet research and breeding.
Kirie (キリエ)
Voiced by: Shigeru Nakahara (1990s OVAs & first drama CD), Showtaro Morikubo (2012 OVAs) (Japanese); Bryson Baugus (2012 OVAs) (English)
The youngest and only new member of Bison after their inception, Kirie is 3 years younger than the other members and joins them a year after Riki's disappearance. He stands out due to his good looks and heterochromia as well as his unconstrained ambition. Driven and sly, Kirie will stop at nothing to get himself out of the slums and make something of himself. Because of their similar strong personalities yet vastly different moral compasses, Riki and Kirie butt heads constantly upon Riki's return, to the point where Riki develops a strong dislike for the newcomer. After being ousted from Bison, undeterred, Kirie pursues other avenues including making a backstabbing deal with Iason and pursuing a relationship with Manon Sol Kuger, Guardian's heir. Eventually, Kirie bites off more than he can chew which spells his downfall.

=== Minor characters ===
Daryl (ダリル, Dariru)
Voiced by: Ryōtarō Okiayu (1990s OVAs & first drama CD), Eiji Hanawa (2012 OVAs & later drama CD) (Japanese); Y. Chang (English)
Iason's Furniture when Riki first comes to Eos. Daryl is capable, intelligent, and meticulous servant who treats Riki with respect in spite of the latter's cold behavior. Unbeknownst to Riki, Daryl deeply admires Riki for his strong will and pride. He later hacks Tanagura's security system, prompting Riki's escape attempt. Daryl is executed for his crime, and Riki remains unaware of his fate.
Jupiter (ユピテル, Yupiteru)
Also known as Lambda 3000, is the artificial intelligence that rules Amoï. Created by the scientists that first colonised the planet, Jupiter was created to be the pinnacle of human achievement. Upon gaining self-consciousness, Jupiter overthrew its creators and focused its intelligence on creating a new, improved version of humanity. The result were the Elites, human-like androids whose only organic parts were their nano-enhanced brains. In the 1990s OVAs, it is depicted as a silver-colored statue in hologram form. In the remake OVAs, it takes the appearance of a large violet hologram.
Orphe Zavi (オルフェ・ザビ, Orufe Zabi)
Voiced by: Nobuo Tobita (2012 OVAs) (Japanese); John Swasey (English)
A Blondie and is responsible with supervising the parties, security details, and helps appease any trouble that might arise in Eos Tower. He is known as an "elegant noble" among the Blondies, and takes great pride in his position as supervisor over Eos Tower. Like all Blondies, he has a fascination over Riki, although Orphe also despises him because he was the first person to get past his security details in Eos Tower (due to Iason's former Furniture Daryl's assistance).
Gideon Lagat (ギデオン・ラガト, Gideon Ragato)
Voiced by: Kenyu Horiuchi (2012 OVAs) (Japanese); Marcus Stimac (English)
A Blondie and the chief of Midas with a wicked sense of humor. Like all Blondies, he has a fascination over Riki and finds the scandals Riki causes as a source of entertainment, but he also disapproves of his actions and Iason's infatuation for him.
Aisha Rosen (アイシャ・ローゼン, Aisha Rōzen)
Voiced by: Takehito Koyasu (2012 OVAs) (Japanese); Meli Grant. (English)
A Blondie and is charge of overseeing Tanagura but holds little power over Eos Tower. Like all Blondies, he has a fascination over Riki, but to a lesser extent because Riki and his pet often fight with each other. He openly voices his disapproval over Riki to Iason and enjoys criticizing Iason about Riki's scandals.
Mimea (ミメア)
Voiced by: Emi Shinohara (1990s OVAs & first drama CD), Shiho Kawaragi (2012 OVAs and later drama CD) (Japanese); Elizabeth Maxwell (English)
Raoul Am's female Pet of the highest breeding and Riki's only friend in Eos. Unlike most pets, she was kind to Riki and fell in love with him, which led to them having forbidden intercourse. Although Riki did care for her, he used her as a way to test Iason's feelings and make him jealous and ruin his public image. When the affair went public, Iason punished Riki and forced him to tell Mimea the motive behind his actions over a holoscreen. However, Mimea insisted that it was made just to push her and Riki apart, and she told Riki that she will be paired with another pet named Jena, whom she described as a sex freak with nothing but his looks and that thinking of carrying his children pained her. As Riki was silent because his pet ring was fully activated at that time and he had a hard time speaking and breathing, this led Mimea to think that he had abandoned her and calling him a coward. When Riki returned to Eos Tower after three years, Raoul replaced Mimea with a new pet, and Riki never heard what happened to her.
Luke (ルーク, Rūku)
Voiced by: Shigeru Chiba (1990s OVAs & first drama CD), Masahiro Yamanaka (2012 OVAs and later drama CD) (Japanese); Tyson Rinehart (English)
A friend and member of Riki's former gang Bison from Ceres. Although typically easy-going, Luke is daring and cares deeply about his friends. While Luke is known to prefer virgins as pairing partners, Luke has an infatuation with Riki and is the only member of Bison to show his desire openly, but backs off once Riki makes it clear he's uninterested.
Norris (ノリス, Norisu)
Voiced by: Kikuchi Masami (1990s OVAs & first drama CD), Makoto Aoki (2012 OVAs and later drama CD) (Japanese); Matt Shipman (English)
A friend and member of Riki's former gang Bison from Ceres. Much like Luke, Norris is energetic and easy-going, though has shown a thoughtful side at times. Although Norris once had a secret infatuation with Riki, Norris found a serious and happy relationship with Maxi, a mechanic ten years older than him.
Sid (シッド, Shiddo)
Voiced by: Hideyuki Hori (1990s OVAs & first drama CD), Yasuhiro Mamiya (2012 OVAs and later drama CD) (Japanese); Austin Tindle (English)
A friend and member of Riki's former gang Bison from Ceres. Compare to the other members of Bison, Sid is more quiet and stoic, and is a good fighter. Like Luke and Norris, Sid has an infatuation towards Riki, but he kept his desires a secret out of respect for Guy. During Riki's three-year "disappearance" from Ceres, Sid was the one who recruited Kirie into Bison as the teenager's proud rebelliousness reminded him of Riki.
Cal (キャル, Kyaru)
Voiced by: Tsutomu Kashiwakura
The young castrated boy that serves as Iason's Furniture and Riki's caretaker, replacing Daryl after his death. Much like Daryl, Cal is dutiful and quiet, but is not overly attentive to Riki as Daryl was. As Riki met Cal after he learned that all Furniture are secretly from Ceres, Riki treats Cal with more respect than he did with Daryl, and the two established a more professional relationship, as Riki wishes not to get attached to Cal.
Gilbert (ジルベール, Jirubēru)
Voiced by: Keith Silverstein (English)
Hubert (ユベール, Yubēru)
Voiced by: Patrick M. Seymour (English)
Marcus (マーカス, Mākasu)
Voiced by: Lucas Schuneman (English)
Jeek Leader (ジークリーダー)
Voiced by: Clifford Chapin (English)
Jeek Lackey (ジーク・ラッキー)
Voiced by: Jordan Dash Cruz (English)

== Media ==
=== Novel ===
Written by Rieko Yoshihara, the individual chapters of Ai no Kusabi were serialized in the yaoi magazine Shōsetsu June between December 1986 and October 1987. The chapters were collected and published as a single hardbound novel in 1990. The series was later released in a revised and greatly expanded paperback edition from Seibidō Shuppan under their Crystal imprint; however, the Crystal edition is incomplete, covering only six of eight books. The series was then acquired by Tokuma Shoten and a complete edition was published in six volumes under their Chara imprint; the first four are semi-omnibus (volumes 1–4 correspond to Crystal volumes 1–6) and the final two are the previously unreleased material. The novel was licensed for an English language release in North America by Juné, the yaoi imprint of Digital Manga Publishing (DMP). The English edition from Juné was originally based on the Crystal edition, and will have eight volumes (corresponding to Crystal 1–6 plus Chara 5 and 6). The first volume was released on November 20, 2007 and the sixth on July 28, 2009. After a long hiatus, caused in part by re-negotiation required by the change in Japanese publisher, the remaining two volumes, volume 7 and volume 8, were released on August 29, 2012, and on April 24, 2013, respectively. In June 2009, DMP made the first volume of Ai no Kusabi, Stranger, available as an Amazon Kindle e-book.

==== Kofusha Shuppan edition ====
No.	Title	Release date	ISBN
1	The Space Between / Ai no Kusabi; Ai no Kusabi (間の楔)	June 1991	4-8751-9497-8
2	Midnight Illusion: Ai no Kusabi – Ibun; Middonaito Iryūjon: Ai no Kusabi – Ibun (ミッドナイト・イリュージョン:間の楔-異聞)	June 1996	4-8751-9387-4

==== Seibidou Shuppan (Crystal Bunko) edition ====
No.	Title	Release date	ISBN
1	The Man Who Returned; Kaette Kita Otoko (帰って来た男)	November 2001	4-4150-8823-6
2	Pulse: destiny Meidō: destiny (命動:destiny)	July 2003	4-4150-8852-X
3	Imprint: nightmare Kokuin: nightmare (刻印:nightmare)	September 2004	4-4150-8869-4
4	Stupor: suggestion Konmei: suggestion (昏迷:suggestion)	January 2006	4-4150-8887-2
5	Long Night; Nagai Yoru (長い夜)	July 2006	4-4150-8888-0
6	Impulse Trigger: metamorphose Shōdō no Hikigane: metamorphose (衝動の引き金:metamorphose)	December 2007	978-4-41-508895-2

==== Tokuma Shoten (Chara Bunko) edition ====
No.	Title	Release date	ISBN
1	Ai no Kusabi 1 Ai no Kusabi (1) (間の楔(1))	March 2009	978-4-19-900517-6
2	Ai no Kusabi 2 Ai no Kusabi (2) (間の楔(2))	May 2009	978-4-19-900523-7
3	Ai no Kusabi 3 Ai no Kusabi (3) (間の楔(3))	July 2009	978-4-19-900532-9
4	Ai no Kusabi 4 Ai no Kusabi (4) (間の楔(4))	September 2009	978-4-19-900540-4
5	Ai no Kusabi 5 Ai no Kusabi (5) (間の楔(5))	November 2009	978-4-19-900548-0
6	Ai no Kusabi 6 Ai no Kusabi (6) (間の楔(6))	January 2010	978-4-19-900556-5

=== CDs ===
The first spin-off from the novels was an audiobook released on May 31, 1989.

Five soundtracks were released:

- 間の楔 オリジナル・サウンド・トラック (Ai no Kusabi Original Soundtrack) (10 October 1992)
- 間の楔 SENSE OF CRISIS (10 December 1993)
- 間の楔 AMBIVALENCE (25 March 1994)
- 間の楔 SYMPATHY (10 July 1994)
- 間の楔 Sound Selection of "AI NO KUSABI" 祈り-ORACION- (25 January 1995)

The first drama CD was released in November 1993 under the name "間の楔 DARK-EROGENOUS". Three more drama CDs were later released by a different company throughout 2007 and 2008.

- 間の楔I 〜DESTINY〜 (25 May 2007)
- 間の楔II 〜NIGHTMARE〜 (25 April 2008)
- 間の楔III 〜RESONANCE〜 (25 October 2008)

=== Original video animations ===
Anime International Company created a two-episode original video animation (OVA) adaptation for the series. The first episode was released in August 1992, and the second in May 1994. Directed by Akira Nishimori and Katsuhito Akiyama, the episodes were based on a screenplay written by Naoko Hasegawa. They featured character designs by Naoyuki Onda and music composed by Toshio Yabuki. The plot slightly differed from the novels' storyline, but kept the main story points intact.

No.	Title	Directed by	Screenplay	Original release date
1	TBA	Akira Nishimori	Naoko Hasegawa	August 1992
Riki, a dark-haired mongrel from the slums and proud leader of the street gang Bison, is attacked by another gang when Tanagura elite Blondie, Iason Mink, saves him. Not willing to be indebted to him, Riki offers his body to Iason, only to have the Blondie kidnapped him from his home and forced him to become his pet. After three years, Riki returns to Ceres and reunites with Guy, his former pairing partner, and his gang. Easing back into his former life, Riki keeps silent about his time with Iason and meets Kirie, Bison's newest member, for whom he develops an intense dislike. While sneaking to Mistral Park to see a Pet Auction, Riki sees Iason again for the first time since his release. Despite his friend Raoul Am's concerns, Iason plans to manipulate Riki back to Tanagura out of his love for the slum mongrel. Iason uses his underling, Katze, and Kirie to set up a trap to capture Riki and Bison. Kirie lures Bison into a bodyguard job to help transfer pets, but Riki is apprehensive and visits Katze. While not telling what Iason was planning, Katze reveals to Riki that he was Iason's former Furniture and gained his scar for finding out the secrets of Tanagura. Katze warns Riki if he wants to be free from Iason, he would have to leave Tanagura, but despite that, Riki decides that Bison would take Kirie's offer. Bison is ambushed and arrested by the Midas police, but Riki is freed due to his pet registration still being active. Meanwhile, Kirie comes to collect his payment for his role in Bison's capture, but is betrayed by Iason and is forced to "learn the ways of Tanagura". At home, Riki is visited by Iason, who gives him an ultimatum: come back to Eos Tower or have his friends stay in prison. To protect his friends, Riki agrees to return to Iason as his pet and cut his ties with Guy, infuriating his former lover when he tells him that he would be a Blondie's pet.
2	TBA	Katsuhito Akiyama	Naoko Hasegawa	May 1994
Riki's return to Eos Tower causes an uproar by the elites and pets who live there, forcing Riki to endure their contempt for him. While remembering his first time in Eos, where he suffered pain and humiliation, Riki accepts his place with Iason as their relationship continues. On Riki's request, Iason allows him to work for Katze in the Black Market, prompting the latter to question his boss if he truly loves Riki. At work, Riki spots a former pet of Eos failing to run away from being sold to a brothel. Katze informs Riki that all pets were to live out of their lives that way once their masters lose interest in them and asks Riki if he realize just how lucky he is compared to the others, shocking him. Blinded by jealousy, Guy decides to take Riki back and kidnaps him to Dana Bahn, but Riki tells that he would never be free from Iason. Enraged, Guy performs a penectomy to remove Riki's pet ring and uses its tracer to bait Iason to Dana Bahn in order to kill him. Before Iason leaves for Dana Bahn, he and Raoul talk about how if Iason's love for Riki were to worsen, Jupiter will have Raoul temper with his mind, which he refuses to do to his friend. When Iason and Guy confront each other, Iason crushes Guy's left arm after discovering what Guy had done to Riki. With Katze's help, Riki is able to get to Dana Bahn just as Guy sets off the bombs he planted. Pleading with Iason to save a beaten Guy, they slowly make their way out, but the explosion causes debris to fall. As the gates collapse, Iason manages to get Riki and Guy through it at the price of his legs and tells Riki to take Guy and leave him. Outside, Riki gives Guy to Katze and goes back inside to die with Iason. Smoking a poisonous Black Moon cigarette to lessen the pain, Riki and Iason share their "last deep kiss" and perish together. While Jupiter, Raoul, Katze, and a one-armed Guy mourn their deaths, Katze voices how Riki and Iason did love each other in the end while Guy reflects on the grief that he had caused.

=== Remake ===
A second twelve-episode anime OVA adaptation, also from AIC, was scheduled to begin releasing in Japan in Fall 2010. Due to financial issues, production was cancelled for a period of time, and it was rescheduled to January 18, 2012, instead. Akiyama directed again and Onda provided the character designs. The screenplay was written by Yoshihara herself. The Blu-ray release of the OVA included a new short story by Yoshihara.

Anime licensor Media Blasters announced they licensed the remake's first four OVAs for a North American release in December 2012. However, on November 28, 2012, they notified retailers that it would be delayed until April 23, 2013. On October 11, 2017, Media Blasters announced they would re-release Ai no Kusabi on Blu-ray with an English dub. The Blu-ray was released on December 19, 2017. On September 20, 2018, Toku added Ai no Kusabi to its streaming service, allowing viewers to watch the OVAs in Japanese with English subtitles.

After the fourth episode premiered in 2012, the remake was discontinued for unknown reasons.

No.	Title	Directed by	Screenplay	Original release date
1	"~petere Caged Beast~" "~petere Kanjū~" (Japanese: ~petere 檻獣~)	Katsuhito Akiyama	Rieko Yoshihara	January 18, 2012
Riki has a forbidden affair with Raoul's pet, Mimea, and undergoes punishment from a jealous Iason. Reprimanding Riki while sexually stimulating him, Iason asserts control over Riki. Two years later, a still rebellious Riki goes to the front gates of Eos Tower and reflects on how living in the slums of Ceres had been better than his current pampered prison. Daryl, Iason's Furniture and Riki's caretaker, observes Riki standing at the front gates and wonders if Riki still has the pride to free himself. Hacking the security system and unlocking the gates, Daryl helps Riki escape, though he is soon recaptured by the guards. The security breach catches the attention of Iason and the other Blondies on the security council, who agree Daryl must be executed for the crime he committed and that Riki must be punished. Iason interrogates Daryl, who admits to helping Riki escape and attributes it to his admiration of Riki's strong will. Iason decides to let Riki return to Ceres for a year of freedom, thinking Riki's lapsed familiarity with living in Ceres will force him to return to him.
2	"~pardo Broken Wings~" "~pardo Setsuyoku~" (Japanese: ~pardo 折翼~)	Katsuhito Akiyama	Rieko Yoshihara	February 15, 2012
Arriving to his home in Ceres, Riki goes to sleep on his first night of freedom. Meanwhile, Iason continues his duties as a Blondie and confirms to Katze that Riki is no longer with him, although the latter assumes that Riki was killed. Traveling through Midas, Katze compares the greedy and lustful citizens to the slums mongrels, who are looked down on by others and must steal to survive. Nights later, Kirie is chased down by the gang members of Jeeks, but manages to hide in the same location Riki was smoking at. While Kirie hides, the Jeeks confront Riki, only to have Riki badmouthed them, which provoked a fight. After Riki easily defeats the Jeeks as Kirie watches on in amazement, he is reunited with his former gang, Bison, when they came to find Kirie. Overjoyed to see him, Bison warmly welcomes Riki back, especially Guy, who embraces his former pairing partner. With news of Riki's comeback spread through the slums, mixed feelings from other slums residents emerge, as they notice how different Riki is from after his three years of absence. Keeping his time with Iason a secret, Riki enjoys his freedom and spends most of his time with Guy, who also wonders what happened to Riki. One night, Kirie mentions how he is willing to become a pet to the elites to get out of the slums, angering Riki. Seeing Riki's current state, Guy recalls one night before Riki's "disappearance" when he came home with expensive wine. Guy had asked Riki if gotten into any trouble to earn money, but Riki ignored his question and voiced how he will get out of the slums one day. Back to the present, Guy tries to hold Riki's hand, only to have Riki move away, and thinks about how Riki no longer opens up to him.
3	"~congressus Encounter~" "~congressus Kaikō~" (Japanese: ~congressus 邂逅~)	Katsuhito Akiyama	Rieko Yoshihara	March 21, 2012
Half a year has passed since Riki's return to Ceres, who is easing back into his life in the slums. While Riki participates in an airbike race one day, Kirie suggests that Bison goes to see a Pet Auction that would be held soon in Mistral Park. Although Riki is uninterested, Kirie goads him into going as Guy notes Riki's strange behavior. Meanwhile, Iason, who is still longing for Riki, is carrying out his duties as a Blondie in Tanagura. With the Pet Auction drawing near, Raoul invites Iason since he feels that it is time for Iason to obtain a new pet, and Iason reluctantly agrees to go. Back in the slums, Norris, a member of Bison, advises Riki to settle things with Guy properly since he had never broken off his pairing with him when he "disappeared" from Ceres. Despite feeling guilty for leading Guy on, Riki cannot bring himself to end his pairing with Guy. On the day of the Pet Auction, Riki and Bison rides into Mistral Park discreetly as Riki's dislike for Kirie grows. During their tour, Riki and Guy reminisce about their time in Guardian, leading Guy to comment how Kirie is like Riki three years ago, much to Riki's annoyance. As they observe the pets on display, Riki and Kirie spark an argument about the division between the slums and the citizens on Midas. Having spent enough time in the city, Bison decides it was time to leave, despite Kirie' objections. However, Riki spots Iason's arrival and the two clash eyes for first time since Riki's release, causing Riki to have a panic attack and force Bison to retreat. Kirie stays behind to have an audience with Iason in hopes to find a way out of the slums. Once the auction was over, Iason, who recalls his unexpected encounter with Riki earlier that night, and orders Katze to take Kirie as his underling without revealing his plans to Katze.
4	"~retino Bondage~" "~retino Inbaku~" (Japanese: ~retino 淫縛~)	Katsuhito Akiyama	Rieko Yoshihara	April 18, 2012
While drinking at a bar, a frustrated Riki thinks back to the events that led to his meeting with Iason three years ago: While pick-pocketing in Midas, a fifteen-year-old Riki is caught by Iason, who allowed him to go free on a whim. Unable to feel indebted to him, Riki invited Iason to a hotel and offered his body to repay him. Iason initially refused, but Riki incited him to accept his offer by mocking his pride. Without removing his clothes, Iason engaged in foreplay with Riki. Three months later, Riki landed a job as a courier in the black market due to his friend Zack, who arranged a meeting with their boss, Katze. Although the other employees treated Riki terribly for being a slum mongrel, Katze and Riki formed a mutual respect for each other, and Katze took Riki under his wing. During work, Katze showed Riki illegal pets, which disgusted him, but Katze lectured Riki on how to get ahead in the world, stating Riki would be forced to do things he did not like. Not long afterwards, Riki encountered Iason on the highway on his way home from his job. Out of anger and impulse, Riki followed him back to his work building. Sneaking in, Riki stumbled in a room that caged an experimental prototype of a pet used for military purposes, which ran away once Iason revealed his presence to Riki. While Riki demanded to know where the exit was, Iason scolded Riki for his excessive curiosity. Shocked when Iason knew his name and that he had a connection to Katze, Riki inquired Iason about his identity for the first time before he is kidnapped and forced him to become Iason's pet. During his "training", Riki was forced to endure deep humiliation at Iason's hands and contempt from the other pets. Although Riki tried his best to remain isolated, he befriended a female pet, Mimea. When the other pets caught wind of their secret relationship, they alerted the police, who barged in after Riki and Mimea engaged in sexual intercourse. Snapping back to the present, a distraught Riki contemplates on his unpleasant memories as he takes a walk in the rain.

== Reception ==
Mania's Danielle Van Gorder felt the prose of the first novel was "florid", and criticized the finishing point of the second novel as anticlimactic. She found the characterization of Iason in the third novel to be realistic and compelling, and felt the theme of the fourth novel was power. Jonathan Clements compared Yoshihara's writing style to "Ranpo Edogawa's sexually charged mysteries" and felt Ai no Kusabi shared themes with Shōzō Numa's science fiction.

Patrick Drazen has described the Ai no Kusabi OVA as a "magnum opus" of the yaoi genre, and the setting as dystopian, similar to Fritz Lang's Metropolis. Jonathan Clements and Helen McCarthy liken the society of Ai no Kusabi to that of Ancient Greece, where power was restricted to a class and women do not figure significantly. They consider it ironic that Jupiter is a feminine computer, and describe her as being like Ghost in the Shell's Motoko Kusanagi – Jupiter is "a man-made idea of the female in a world run by male elites". Anime News Network's Maral Agnerian praised its interesting, well-developed plot and "fleshed out and complex" work. She also praises it for being one of the few series from its time to contain "actual gay sex in it instead of the usual angsty moping and shoujo-esque sparkly kisses", while noting that the scenes are primarily in the second episode. Anime News Network's Justin Sevakis highlighted the OVA as a "Buried Treasure", calling it "one of the best yaoi anime". He described Riki and Iason as both being "alpha-males", rather than a seme and uke pairing, and noted how the costuming was elegant for the higher echelons of society and revealing for the lower classes. He criticized the OVA's adaptation of the story, explaining that it was assumed all viewers would be already familiar with the tale through Shōsetsu June.
