= Legend of the Galactic Heroes (2008 video game) =

Japanese strategy game

- Developer: MicroVision
- Publisher: Bandai Namco Games
- Producer: Norihiko Ushimura
- Designer: Kōichi Egawa
- Series: Legend of the Galactic Heroes
- Platform: Windows
- Release: JP: October 16, 2008
- Genre: Real-time tactics
- Modes: Single-player, multiplayer

Legend of the Galactic Heroes (Japanese: 銀河英雄伝説, Hepburn: Gingahideodensetsu) is a 2008 Japanese real-time tactical simulation game for Microsoft Windows. It was developed by MicroVision and published by Namco Bandai Games. Based on the military science fiction and space opera novel series Legend of the Galactic Heroes by Yoshiki Tanaka, the game was released in Japan on October 16, 2008 for Windows XP and Vista. It was rated C (ages 15 and up) by CERO, and sold in both a standard edition (suggested price was 9,240 yen), and a limited edition with miniature models of the Brünhild and Hyperion spaceships (11,340 yen).

== Gameplay ==
The game focuses on large-scale tactical fleet battles, situating itself between the micro-level of action shooters and the macro-level of grand strategy games. Players command thousands of ships organized into fleets, maneuvering them in real time on two-dimensional battlefields. Victory depends on coordinating multiple fleets, outmaneuvering opponents, and exploiting enemy vulnerabilities. As in the source novels, flanking and rear attacks play a decisive role, since capital ships are highly exposed from the sides and back.

Each fleet consists of up to ten squadrons, with leaders assigned roles such as commander, deputy, and wing commanders. Characters from the novels, including Reinhard von Lohengramm and Yang Wen-li, serve as commanders, each with statistics such as leadership, mobility, firepower, space combat, and defense. Admirals also possess unique special techniques, abilities triggered with a cut-in animation and quotes from the novels or anime, which can temporarily enhance performance or apply special effects in combat.

Formations are another key mechanic, with offensive, encirclement, and defensive types such as column, spindle, line, crane wing, circle, and square. These have rock–paper–scissors-style strengths and weaknesses. Characters differ in the formations they can use; Reinhard and Yang cannot employ defensive formations unless paired with suitable deputies, such as Siegfried Kircheis or Patrichev. This design element encourages careful team composition.

== Modes ==
The game features three core modes: campaign, single game, and multiplayer. In campaign mode, players follow the original story through staged battles interspersed with dialogue scenes. The Galactic Empire campaign includes 18 missions, while the Free Planets Alliance campaign includes 14 missions, for a total of 32 stages. Story events span from the Sixth Battle of Iserlohn to the Battle of Vermilion, with anime footage and CG cutscenes used for dramatic effect. Although major story outcomes cannot be altered, some characters who canonically die in the source material, such as Kircheis, Jean Robert Lapp, and Nguyen Van Hugh, can survive thanks to player actions, allowing them to participate in later stages.

In single game mode, players can freely set battlefield conditions and fleets, while multiplayer allows up to eight participants (four per side) via Games for Windows – Live. Each player controls a single fleet, replicating the role of a commander. Developed admirals gain experience and levels from battles, which increase their effectiveness and carry over between modes. Multiplayer emphasizes reconnaissance, positioning, and coordination between teammates.

== Development ==
The game was produced by Norihiko Ushimura of Bandai Namco Games, known for the Giren's Ambition series, with game design by Kōichi Egawa of Easy Creation, designer of Pacific Storm 2. In interviews, the developers emphasized recreating the feel of Legend of the Galactic Heroes fleet battles. Efforts included implementing multi-layered maps to add visual depth to fleets, programming beam weapons to fire in ways reminiscent of the anime, and designing air units such as the Empire's Valkyries and the Alliance's Spartanians to reflect their canonical usage. Developers noted their own long-standing enthusiasm for the franchise and aimed to create a product faithful to the source material.

== Reception ==
The review at GAME Watch (part of Impress Watch portal) praised the title as a high-quality tactical simulation that successfully captured the appeal of the source material while also standing on its own as a serious strategy game. It was compared favorably to the Total War and Theater of War series, though criticized for performance issues when zooming in on ship models and limited camera controls.

The 4Gamer review described the game as a "dream title" for dedicated fans of the series, highlighting its faithful reproduction of fleet battles and overall atmosphere. While noting shortcomings in system balance and technical execution, the reviewer emphasized that the audiovisual presentation and scenario design allowed players to "play at being admirals", making it highly appealing to fans even if not a competitive multiplayer game. The producers reported that early sales were strong, with high sell-through rates and additional retailer orders, and indicated that the possibility of sequels or expansions would depend on continued fan support.
