= Katsumi Michihara =

Japanese artist (born 1958)

Katsumi Michihara (道原 かつみ, Michihara Katsumi; born February 13, 1958 in Mihara, Hiroshima) is a Japanese illustrator and manga artist. She is most notable for creating the manga adaptations of Yoshiki Tanaka light novels, Legend of the Galactic Heroes, as well as illustrating the Tokuma Shoten release of Tytania, and for the yaoi series Ai no Kusabi. She won the 21st Seiun Award for best art in 1990.

== Works ==
- Legend of the Galactic Heroes: Golden Wings (Japanese: 銀河英雄伝説外伝 黄金の翼, Hepburn: Ginga Eiyū Densetsu Gaiden: Ōgon no Tsubasa)

Role: illustrations

- Legend of Galactic Heroes (Japanese: 銀河英雄伝説, Hepburn: Ginga Eiyū Densetsu)

The manga edition is authored by Katsumi Michihara, and is derived from the first two volumes of the original-novel. This manga story is faithful to the original, possibly more faithful than the anime. However, there are some changes that could be considered major, e.g. the gender of a character is changed. Akira Kasahara is cooperating in drawing mechanics.
Role: story & art (original story by Tanaka Yoshiki)

- The Space Between (Japanese: 間の楔, Hepburn: Ai no Kusabi)

Japanese novel written by Rieko Yoshihara, originally serialized in the yaoi magazine Shousetsu June between December 1986 and October 1987.
Role: illustrations

- Joker (Japanese: 『ジョーカー』, Hepburn: Jōkā)

Manga by Yuu Asagi, published between 1987-2004.
Role: illustrations

- Tytania (Japanese: タイタニア, Hepburn: Taitania)

Three Japanese light novel series written by Yoshiki Tanaka between 1988 and 1991.
Role: illustrations (Tokuma Shoten)

- Legacy of Aru Kararu (Japanese: アル・カラルの遺産, Hepburn: Al Caral no Isan)

Manga written and illustrated by Michihara Katsumi, released in 1990.
Role: story & art
