= Aru Kararu no Isan =

1993 Japanese original video animation

- あるからるの遺産
- Directed by: Kōichi Ishiguro
- Written by: Mayori Sekijima
- Based on: Al Kalal no Isan by Katsumi Michihara
- Production company: Animate Film
- Release date: 1993
- Running time: 75 minutes
- Country: Japan
- Language: Japanese

Aru Kararu no Isan (Japanese: アル・カラルの遺産, Hepburn: Al Caral no Isan), also known as Legacy of Aru Kararu, The Inheritance of Aru Kararu, Archa Lyra and Al Caral no Isan, is a 1993 Japanese original video animation (OVA) directed by Kōichi Ishiguro and written by Mayori Sekijima. Produced by Animate Film, it is based on Katsumi Michihara's 1985 manga of the same title.

== Plot ==
Set in the mid-twenty-sixth century, the story follows the discovery of Toryune, a member of the alien Saanan species who is held captive by the Hartz Bougen Corporation (HBC), a company that dominates the investigation of alien relics. A documentary crew from Volg Production Studio travels to Planet Badam in search of overlooked artifacts while researcher Dr. Hanagi arrives at an HBC space station and learns that the corporation is preparing for first contact with the alien prisoner.

Toryune reveals that the mysterious Al Caral civilization created both the Saanan and many of the relics scattered across the galaxy. During his imprisonment, HBC scientists discover that his DNA closely resembles that of humans, while the corporation secretly attempts to recreate the Al Caral through cloning from preserved remains. One of the resulting clones, Shana T, survives without initially knowing her origins and eventually encounters Toryune, who identifies her as an Al Caral.

Shana joins forces with the Volg Production Studio crew in an unsuccessful attempt to rescue Toryune. Although Toryune's humanoid body is killed, the event awakens Shana's latent powers, leading to the deaths of the HBC leadership. Afterwards, Shana and the pilot Hammer set out to return Toryune's surviving reptilian symbiote to Planet Go 7498, while HBC official Zach Isedo travels there to establish peaceful contact with the Saanan inhabitants.

== Production ==
The original video animation was directed by Kōichi Ishiguro, written by Mayori Sekijima, animated by Masayuki Kojima, character designs by Satoshi Sega, and produced by Animate Film. It was adapted from Katsumi Michihara's manga of the same title, originally published in 1985 and later illustrated in graphic form in 1990. The principal voice cast includes Yuzuru Fujimoto, Aya Hisakawa, Hideyuki Hori, Ai Orikasa, and Hideyuki Tanaka.

== Themes ==
According to The Encyclopedia of Science Fiction, the film places science-fiction concepts at the center of its narrative, incorporating ideas such as alien civilizations, cloning, genetic engineering, psychic abilities, and symbiotic lifeforms. The encyclopedia also notes that many aspects of the setting and backstory are only hinted at, creating the impression that the audience is seeing only part of a larger story and leaving several plot threads unresolved. The reviewer also noted that It is unclear whether the film’s abrupt close before resolving key plot threads was meant as a slingshot ending (stopping just as characters head toward an anticipated goal, inviting the audience to imagine the rest) or whether the writers were setting up a sequel.

The show has likely been inspired by works such as Ray Bradbury's Dark They Were, and Golden-Eyed, Hitoshi Iwaaki's Parasyte and Frank Herbert's Dune.

== Reception ==
The Encyclopedia of Science Fiction described the characterization and adventures as "adequate rather than noteworthy", but praised the work for making speculative science-fiction ideas central to the story rather than merely providing a backdrop for action sequences. It concluded that this emphasis makes the OVA "a good and interesting anime".

The OVA's entry in The Anime Encyclopedia, written by Jonathan Clements and Helen McCarthy, opined that it "taps into a rich vein of SF concepts and puts them to good use".

== Other media ==
The OVA is based on Katsumi Michihara's 1985 manga of the same title. The manga was mentioned in Shisō no Kagaku magazine, where the reviewer remarked that "it ended just when it was getting interesting", which was due to the discontinuation of the magazine (Ryu) in which it was serialized. A sequel, Archalyra, was released in 1993.
