= Rail of the Star =

1993 anime film

- Kana: お星さまのレール
- Revised Hepburn: O Hoshisama no Reeru
- Directed by: Toshio Hirata
- Written by: Hideo Asakura; Tatsuhiko Urahata
- Music by: Koichi Sakata
- Production company: Madhouse
- Release date: 10 July 1993 (Japan)
- Running time: 80 minutes
- Country: Japan
- Language: Japanese

Rail of the Star (お星さまのレール, O-Hoshisama no Rail), is an anime film based on Chitose Kobayashi's autobiographical novel of the same name, produced on the occasion of the 30th anniversary of the Japanese Movie Center.

It narrates the vicissitudes suffered by the Kobayashi family after the armed conflict of the World War II, focused according to Chitose's vision at the time.

It was produced by TV Tokyo, animated by Madhouse and directed by Toshio Hirata; its premiere in Japan was on July 10, 1993.

== Plot ==
Chitose Kobayashi, a seven-year-old Japanese girl, raised in the Sinuiju of Korea occupied by Japan during World War II, completely ignored what it meant to be at war, but unfortunately she soon discovered that it affected the soldiers so much that they fight on the mountain front like the civilians living far away from the battlefield.

World War II begins for her the day her father receives a letter that forced him to enlist in the army and leave for the front.

Subsequently, a series of devastating events that mark her childhood occur. Miko, Chitose's younger sister, dies of typhoid; Ohana, her Korean servant girl and friend, is fired after committing imprudence; and Japan surrenders to the Allies.

Upon returning from her father, already in times of peace, the Russians invaded North Korea and the whole family was forced to leave that country. After unearthing the ashes of Miko, they must board a train that will take them further south of the 38th parallel, where the Americans are. However, they are forced to abandon it halfway to escape an inspection of the North Koreans. Another of the setbacks with which they have to face is the disorientation to walk on unknown roads, which causes them to move in circles throughout the day, but manage to follow the map drawn by the stars in the sky. As they progress, the difficulties will increase until they reach an emotional outcome.

== Voice cast ==
- Yoshino Takamori as Chitose Kobayashi (Chiko)
- Hideyuki Tanaka as Kazuhiko Kobayashi
- Keiko Han as Masuko Kobayashi
- Kenichi Ogata as Takeshi
- Chika Sakamoto as Michiyo Kobayashi (Miko)
- Reiko Suzuki as Shigeko
- Tomoko Maruo as Ohana
- Shinpachi Tsuji as Sano
- Hideyuki Umezu as Takayashi
- Chafurin as Village Chief
- Yuka Ohno as Yohko
- Issei Miyazaki as Yong-Il
- Michiko Neya as Hatsue
- Junji Kitajima as Guide
- Koji Ishii as Interpreter
- Eiji Itô as Station Staff
- Yuuko Sumitomo as Yukiko
- Nariatsu Nomura as Officer
