= Legend of the Galactic Heroes =

Series of sci-fi novels by Yoshiki Tanaka

- Cover of the original novel of Legend of the Galactic Heroes volume 1, first edition (Tokuma Novels, 1982)

銀河英雄伝説 (Ginga Eiyū Densetsu)
- Genre: Military science fiction; Space opera
- Novel series
- Written by: Yoshiki Tanaka
- Illustrated by: Naoyuki Kato (vol. 1–5); Yukihisa Kamoshita (vol. 6–10)
- Published by: Tokuma Shoten
- English publisher: NA: Viz Media
- Original run: November 30, 1982 – November 15, 1987
- Volumes: 10
- Novel series

Gaiden
- Written by: Yoshiki Tanaka
- Illustrated by: Katsumi Michihara (vol. 1, 3–4); Akira Kasahara (vol. 2); Yukinobu Hoshino (vol. 5); Hiroshi Yokoyama (short stories)
- Published by: Tokuma Shoten (vol. 1–4); Tokyo Sogensha (vol. 5)
- Original run: September 1, 1984 – July 31, 1989
- Volumes: 5
Further information
Manga
Golden Wings
Written by	Katsumi Michihara
Published by	Tokuma Shoten
Magazine	Chara
Published	August 10, 1986
Volumes	1
Manga
Written by	Katsumi Michihara
Published by	Tokuma Shoten
Magazine	Shōnen Captain
Original run	August 1986 – February 2000
Volumes	11
Anime film
My Conquest is the Sea of Stars
Directed by	Noboru Ishiguro
Produced by	Yukio Kikukawa; Masatoshi Tahara; Yoshio Sugawara
Written by	Takeshi Shudō
Music by	VEB Deutsche Schallplatten
Studio	Madhouse; Artland
Licensed by	NA: Sentai Filmworks
Released	February 6, 1988
Runtime	60 minutes
Original video animation
Season 1 (1–26) Season 2 (27–54) Season 3 (55–86) Season 4 (87–110)
Directed by	Noboru Ishiguro (Note: Credited as 総監督 (Chief Director)); Masatoshi Tahara (S2, S4) (Note: Credited under the pseudonym Masato Shitahara (簧原雅人) for season 2.); Keizō Shimizu (S3) (Note: Credited as Animation Director (アニメーションディレクター). Note: This credit is used similar to "series director" in this instance, according to an interview with Shimizu himself.)
Produced by	Yukio Kikukawa; Hiroyuki Katō (S1); Akiko Odawara (S2); Michio Yokoo (S2); Yōji Suzuki (S3); Masatoshi Tahara (S4)
Written by	Masatoshi Tahara (Note: Credited under the pseudonym Shimao Kawanaka (河中志摩夫).)
Music by	Shinsuke Kazato; VEB Deutsche Schallplatten
Studio	Kitty Film Mitaka Studio (S1–S3) (Note: Every episode was produced with major outsourcing assistance (制作協力) from other animation studios: Magic Bus (51 episodes. Episodes 7 & 23 VHS remake versions only.); Artland (42 episodes); Madhouse (26 episodes); I.G. Tatsunoko (6 episodes); Shaft (6 episodes); AIC (4 episodes); E&G Films (2 episodes); Mushi Production (2 episodes); Raijin Film (Episode 4); Studio Look (Episode 5); Bebow (Episode 7); Watanabe Promotion (Episode 16); Tokyo Kids (Episode 40)); K-Factory (S4) (Note: Animation services provided by: Shaft (8 episodes), Magic Bus (8 episodes), Artland (6 episodes), and Mushi Production (2 episodes). K-Factory did not possess an animation studio and outsourced all of the work to the aforementioned companies.)
Licensed by	NA: Sentai Filmworks
Released	December 21, 1988 – March 11, 1997
Runtime	24–27 minutes (each)
Episodes	110
Anime film
Golden Wings
Directed by	Keizō Shimizu
Produced by	Yukio Kikukawa; Masatoshi Tahara; Michio Yokoo
Written by	Kazumi Koide
Music by	Tomoki Hasegawa
Studio	Magic Bus
Licensed by	NA: Sentai Filmworks
Released	December 12, 1992
Runtime	60 minutes
Anime film
Overture to a New War
Directed by	Keizō Shimizu
Produced by	Yukio Kikukawa; Masatoshi Tahara; Michio Yokoo; Yōji Suzuki
Written by	Shimao Kawanaka
Music by	VEB Deutsche Schallplatten
Studio	Magic Bus
Licensed by	NA: Sentai Filmworks
Released	December 18, 1993
Runtime	90 minutes
Original video animation
Gaiden: Season 1 (1–24) Gaiden: Season 2 (25–52)
Directed by	Noboru Ishiguro; Asami Ryū (S1); Keizō Shimizu (S2)
Produced by	Yukio Kawamura; Takahiro Inagaki
Written by	Shimao Kawanaka
Music by	VEB Deutsche Schallplatten
Studio	K-Factory (Note: Animation services provided by: Magic Bus, Artland, Shaft (season 1), and Mushi Production (season 1).)
Licensed by	NA: Sentai Filmworks
Released	February 9, 1998 – June 27, 2000
Runtime	25–30 minutes (each)
Episodes	52
Manga
Portrait of Heroes
Written by	Katsumi Michihara
Published by	Tokuma Shoten
Magazine	Monthly Comic Ryū
Original run	October 19, 2006 – September 19, 2012
Volumes	4
Manga
Written by	Ryu Fujisaki
Published by	Shueisha
Magazine	Weekly Young Jump; (2015–2020); Ultra Jump; (2020–2026)
Original run	October 8, 2015 – February 18, 2026
Volumes	35
Anime television series
Die Neue These: Encounter
Directed by	Shunsuke Tada
Produced by	Hidemasa Tasaka
Written by	Noboru Takagi
Music by	Shin Hashimoto; Yasuhisa Inoue
Studio	Production I.G
Licensed by	NA: Crunchyroll
Original network	Family Gekijo, Tokyo MX, MBS, BS11
English network	SEA: Animax Asia
Original run	April 3, 2018 – June 26, 2018
Episodes	12
Anime television series
Die Neue These: Stellar War
Directed by	Shunsuke Tada
Produced by	Hidemasa Tasaka
Written by	Noboru Takagi
Music by	Shin Hashimoto; Yasuhisa Inoue
Studio	Production I.G
Licensed by	NA: Crunchyroll
Original network	NHK
English network	SEA: Animax Asia
Original run	Theatrical version; September 27, 2019 (#1); October 25, 2019 (#2); November 29, 2019 (#3); Broadcast version; June 29, 2020 – September 14, 2020
Episodes	12 (Note: Originally three films released in theaters that were later divided into four episodes each.)
Anime film series
Die Neue These: Collision
Directed by	Shunsuke Tada
Produced by	Hidemasa Tasaka
Written by	Noboru Takagi
Music by	Shin Hashimoto; Yasuhisa Inoue
Studio	Production I.G
Licensed by	NA: Crunchyroll
Released	March 4, 2022 (#1); April 1, 2022 (#2); May 13, 2022 (#3)
Films	3 (Note: Each film was split into 4 episodes in the international version distributed by Crunchyroll.)
Anime film series
Die Neue These: Intrigue
Directed by	Shunsuke Tada
Produced by	Hidemasa Tasaka
Written by	Noboru Takagi
Music by	Shin Hashimoto; Yasuhisa Inoue
Studio	Production I.G
Licensed by	NA: Crunchyroll
Released	September 30, 2022 (#1); October 28, 2022 (#2); November 25, 2022 (#3)
Films	3
- icon

Legend of the Galactic Heroes (Japanese: 銀河英雄伝説, Hepburn: Ginga Eiyū Densetsu), sometimes abbreviated as LOTGH, LOGH, LGH or Gin'eiden (銀英伝) in Japanese (and also depicted as Heldensagen vom Kosmosinsel in the anime intro), is a series of epic science fiction novels written by Yoshiki Tanaka. Taking place in the distant future, the series follows two interstellar states – the monarchic Galactic Empire and the republican Free Planets Alliance – that are embroiled in a never-ending war. The story focuses on the exploits of rivals Reinhard von Lohengramm and Yang Wen-li, as they rise to fame and power in the Galactic Empire and the Free Planets Alliance, respectively.

An anime adaptation of the novels, produced by Kitty Films, was produced from 1988 to 1997. There is also a manga based on the novels, with art by Katsumi Michihara. In addition, there are several video game adaptations, with the most recent PC release in 2008 being a real-time strategy game. The series did not receive an official English release until 2015, when North American anime and manga distributor Viz Media announced they had acquired the license for the novels. On the same day, North American anime licensor Sentai Filmworks announced their license to the anime; the anime was later released on Hidive in 2017. A second anime adaptation by Production I.G was released in 2018.

== Setting ==
In AD 2801, the Galactic Federation is formed, resulting in political power moving away from the planet Earth (now named Terra) and the Space Era calendar replacing the Gregorian calendar, with 2801 AD now being SE 1. Rudolf von Goldenbaum, an ex-admiral turned dictatorial politician, is elected to power. After declaring himself Emperor Rudolf I, absolute monarch of the renamed Galactic Empire, he restarts the calendar again, beginning the Imperial Calendar on SE 310/AD 3110. His regime adopts extreme policies, including the suppression of any opposition and the extermination of anyone deemed "too weak" (such as the disabled and the poor), which is carried out until his death in IC 42/SE 351/AD 3151. He also moves the capital of the Empire to the planet Odin, the third planet in the Valhalla system.

In IC 164/SE 473/AD 3273, a group of serfs in the Altair Starzone manage to escape captivity and make "the Long March of 10,000 Light-Years" into the Sagittarius Arm to escape the Galactic Empire, located within the Orion Arm. These people set up the Free Planets Alliance, a democratic republic which uses the Space Era calendar, founding the Alliance in SE 527/IC 218/AD 3327 on the planet Heinessen. In SE 640/IC 331/AD 3440, the first battle between the Empire and Alliance occurs, resulting in a major Alliance victory. The two realms have been at war ever since.

A third realm is also set up, the Dominion of Fezzan, a planet-state (city-state on a galactic scale) with connections to Terra. It technically remains a part of the Empire and pays tribute, but also maintains a relationship with the Alliance. Ruled by a domain lord called the "landsherr", Fezzan gains power by acting as both paragon and trickster, providing the only link between the Empire and Alliance, while simultaneously playing the two sides against one another.

== Plot ==
The story is staged in the distant future within the Milky Way Galaxy, starting in SE 796/IC 487/AD 3596. A portion of the galaxy is filled with terraformed worlds, inhabited by interstellar traveling human beings. For 150 years, two mighty space powers have intermittently warred with each other: the Galactic Empire and the Free Planets Alliance.

Within the Galactic Empire, an ambitious military genius, Reinhard von Müsel, later conferred the name Reinhard von Lohengramm, is rising to power. He is driven by the desire to free his sister Annerose, who was taken by the Kaiser as a concubine. Later, he wants not only to end the corrupt Goldenbaum dynasty, but also to defeat the Free Planets Alliance and unify the whole galaxy under his rule.

In the Free Planets Alliance Star Fleet is another genius, Yang Wen-li. He originally aspired to become a historian through a military academy, and joined the tactical division only out of need for tuition money. He was rapidly promoted to commodore because he demonstrated excellence in military strategy in a number of decisive battles and conflicts. He becomes the arch-rival of Reinhard, though they highly respect one another. Unlike Reinhard, he is better known for his underdog victories and accomplishments in overcoming seemingly impossible odds and mitigating collateral damages and casualties due to military operations.

As a historian, Yang often predicts the motives behind his enemies, narrating the rich history of his world and offering commentary. One of his famous quotes is "There are few wars between good and evil; most are between one good and another good."

There is a third neutral power nominally attached to the Galactic Empire, the Fezzan Dominion, a planet-state that trades with both warring powers. There is also a Terraism cult, which believes that humans should go back to Earth, gaining popularity throughout the galaxy. Throughout the story, executive political figures of Fezzan, in concert with the upper-hierarchy of the Terraism cult, orchestrate a number of conspiracies to shift the tide of the galactic war to favor their objectives. The name "Fezzan" is a reference to Fezzan, a region of modern Libya that played an analogous historical role to the one in the anime.

Christopher Farris of the Anime News Network wrote that the novels focus on "personal matters of the main players" instead of being "rote historical accounts", while the 1988–1997 anime series focuses on "the big picture of the war", with multiple characters chronicled, and the 2018 series focuses "only on the major plays by our two main actors to fit within its shorter, more focused format."

== Media ==
=== Novels ===
The series proper is based on a ten-novel series written by Yoshiki Tanaka, as well as a number of other shorter stories set in the same universe, collected in five Legend of the Galactic Heroes Gaiden volumes. It won the Seiun Award for "Best Novel of the Year" in 1988.

On July 2, 2015, Viz Media had announced that it had licensed the novels for release in North America under their Haikasoru imprint. The company had only initially licensed the first three novels, but stated that it would license more if sales were good. The first novel, Dawn, was released on March 8, 2016. The company eventually licensed and released all the novels, and the final volume, Sunset, was released on November 19, 2019. The novels were translated by Daniel Huddleston, Tyran Grillo and Matt Treyvaud. The first three novels were also released as audiobooks.

=== Anime ===
==== My Conquest Is the Sea of Stars ====
Legend of the Galactic Heroes: My Conquest Is the Sea of Stars (銀河英雄伝説 わが征くは星の大海, Ginga Eiyū Densetsu: Waga Yuku wa Hoshi no Taikai) is the first animated adaptation of Yoshiki Tanaka's Legend of the Galactic Heroes series of novels. It was originally released in Japan on February 6, 1988. The film chronicles the first combat encounter between Reinhard von Müsel (who later adopted the Lohengramm name) and Yang Wen-li, the two primary protagonists of the series. The main original video animation (OVA) series followed only months later, picking up where this film left off.

==== Legend of the Galactic Heroes ====
Legend of the Galactic Heroes (銀河英雄伝説, Ginga Eiyū Densetsu) is the second and longest-running animated adaptation of Tanaka's series of novels. It was released in direct home video installments during four separate periods between December 1988 and March 1997. The OVA comprises 110 episodes. It was later shown on television and has seen multiple releases on both DVD and Blu-ray formats. It is also known by the (grammatically incorrect) German title Heldensagen vom Kosmosinsel, (Note: Literally "hero saga of the cosmic island".) which is used in its opening credits.

==== Golden Wings ====
Legend of the Galactic Heroes: Golden Wings (銀河英雄伝説外伝 黄金の翼, Ginga Eiyū Densetsu Gaiden: Ōgon no Tsubasa) is the third animated adaptation of Legend of the Galactic Heroes, adapting the short story of the same name. It was originally released on home video in Japan in October 1992, then released in cinemas in December of that year. Its art style is notable in that it follows the art style of the Katsumi Michihara's manga adaptation rather than the other animated works. Its ending theme song is "Futari Mita Yume ~Two of Us~", performed and composed by Hiroyuki Matsuda, written by Gorou Matsui, and arranged by David Campbell.

==== Overture to a New War ====
Legend of the Galactic Heroes: Overture to a New War (銀河英雄伝説 新たなる戦いの序曲(オーヴァチュア), Ginga Eiyū Densetsu: Arata Naru Tatakai no Ōvachua) is the fourth animated adaptation of Tanaka's novels. It was originally released in Japan on December 18, 1993. It expands upon the events covered in the first two episodes of the 1988 OVA series.

==== Gaiden ====
Legend of the Galactic Heroes Gaiden (銀河英雄伝説外伝, Ginga Eiyū Densetsu Gaiden) is the fifth animated adaptation (counting films) of Tanaka's novel series. It was originally released in Japan between February 1998 and July 2000. It served as a prequel to the main series, adapting Legend of the Galactic Heroes Gaiden, or side stories, series of novels, (then) uncollected short stories, and also original stories.

Series 1, released from February to September 1998, consists of adaptations of the short stories "Silver-White Valley", "Dream of the Morning, Song of Night" and "Disgrace" (later included in the Golden Wings collection), and the novel A Hundred Billion Stars, a Hundred Billion Lights.

Series 2, released between December 1999 and June 2000, consists of adaptations of the novels Spiral Labyrinth and part of The Star Crusher ("The Third Tiamat Battle"), as well as the original stories "The Mutineer", "The Duellist", and "The Retriever".

==== Die Neue These ====
Legend of the Galactic Heroes: Die Neue These - Encounter (銀河英雄伝説 DIE(ディ) NEUE(ノイエ) THESE(テーゼ) 邂逅, Ginga Eiyū Densetsu: Di Noie Tēze - Kaikō) started being produced by Production I.G during 2017. Shunsuke Tada directed the series and Noboru Takagi supervised the scripts. Yoko Kikuchi, Iwao Teraoka, and Katsura Tsushima designed the characters. The mecha designs by Naoyuki Kato were drafted by Atsushi Takeuchi, Shinji Usui, and Shinobu Tsuneki. DMM Pictures, Shochiku, and Tokuma Shoten were credited with production of the anime, alongside Production I.G. The anime stars Mamoru Miyano as Reinhard von Lohengramm, Kenichi Suzumura as Yang Wen-li, and Yuichiro Umehara as Siegfried Kircheis. The series premiered from April 3 to June 26, 2018, and ran for 12 episodes. The opening theme is "Binary Star" by SawanoHiroyuki[nZk]:Uru, and the ending theme is "Wish" by Elisa.

A second season, Legend of the Galactic Heroes: Die Neue These—Stellar War (銀河英雄伝説 DIE(ディ) NEUE(ノイエ) THESE(テーゼ) 星乱, Ginga Eiyū Densetsu: Di Noie Tēze—Seiran), premiered in Japanese theaters as three films, each with four episodes, in 2019. The films premiered on September 27, October 25, and November 29, 2019, respectively. The ending theme for the films is "Tranquility" by SawanoHiroyuki[nZk]:Anly. It was broadcast on TV with a reairing of the first season in 2020.

A third season, Legend of the Galactic Heroes: Die Neue These—Clash (銀河英雄伝説 DIE(ディ) NEUE(ノイエ) THESE(テーゼ) 激突, Ginga Eiyū Densetsu: Di Noie Tēze—Gekitotsu), premiered in Japanese theaters as a three-part film series in 2022 on March 4, April 1, and May 13, respectively. The opening theme for the films is "dust" by SennaRin, while the ending theme is "melt" by SennaRin.

A fourth season, Legend of the Galactic Heroes: Die Neue These—Intrigue (銀河英雄伝説 DIE(ディ) NEUE(ノイエ) THESE(テーゼ) 策謀, Ginga Eiyū Densetsu: Di Noie Tēze—Sakubo), premiered in Japanese theaters as a three-part film series in 2022 on September 30, October 28, and November 25, respectively.

A fifth season was announced in November 2023.

==== English-language release ====
An English dub pilot was produced by Outis Productions and Ocean Productions in the late 1990s, at the request of Tokuma Shoten. The dubbed episodes were the episodes 51 and 52, and were shown at several anime conventions including Anime Expo. The series was not picked up at that time.

On July 2, 2015, Sentai Filmworks announced their license to the anime series at their panel at Anime Expo, and later commented that they hoped to create the "definitive release". A limited edition box set with only 1,000 produced was released in August 2018 and cost $799. The set sold out in May 2021.

On June 20, 2017, Sentai Filmworks announced the streaming release on Hidive's anime streaming service starting the same day. It left streaming in mid-2024.

Die Neue These is streamed in North America by Crunchyroll.

=== Manga ===
The first manga adaptation was authored by Katsumi Michihara, and adapts the first two volumes of the original novel. It was published from 1986 to 2000, and collected in eleven volumes. A four-volume continuation, Legend of the Galactic Heroes: Portrait of Heroes, was published from 2006 to 2012 and adapts the third volume of the original novel. This manga story is faithful to the original, possibly more faithful than the OVAs. However, there are some changes that could be considered major, e.g. the gender and ethnicity of Adrian Rubinsky are changed. Akira Kasahara cooperated in drawing mechanics. Michihara also adapted the side story "Golden Wings" into a one-shot manga of the same name in August 1986.

A manga adaptation by Ryu Fujisaki started in Shueisha's Weekly Young Jump on October 8, 2015. The manga was transferred to Ultra Jump on February 19, 2020. Shueisha has compiled its chapters into individual tankōbon volumes, with the first volume being released on February 19, 2016. The manga ended serialization in the magazine's March 2026 issue, released on February 18. As of March 18, 2026, 35 volumes have been published.

=== Games ===
Several video games based on Legend of the Galactic Heroes have been released for various platforms, including an online multiplayer strategy game (the most recent PC release in 2008 was a real-time strategy game). All of them have been released in Japan whilst some of them have been introduced in the Republic of Korea. Most of these games were published by Bothtec and Tokuma Shoten. A board game was released in 1998. Characters from the series were added to the game Romance of the Three Kingdoms XIV as DLC.

==== Social games ====
All service closed

- GREE: Legend of the Galactic Heroes - the monarchic Galactic Empire - 2012/3/16 DARTS LIVE GAMES
- GREE: Legend of the Galactic Heroes - the democratic Free Planets Alliance - 2012/4/23 DARTS LIVE GAMES
- mobage: Legend of the Galactic Heroes - the monarchic Galactic Empire - 2012/10/22 DARTS LIVE GAMES
- mobage: Legend of the Galactic Heroes - the democratic Free Planets Alliance - 2012/11/13 DARTS LIVE GAMES

==== Browser games ====
- Legend of the Galactic Heroes Tactics (service closed) - DMM GAMES
- Legend of the Galactic Heroes: Rondo of War - G123
- Legend of the Galactic Heroes - Die Neue Saga - Aiming

=== Stage productions ===
In 2012, the series was adapted as a musical by the all-female performance troupe Takarazuka Revue.

In February 2014, the most recent stage production of Legend of the Galactic Heroes opened, and it ended with an announcement of a new anime adaptation. Tanaka's secretary, Hirofumi Adachi, confirmed the news and relayed the producer's comments that the new anime is not a remake of the earlier anime, but another anime adaptation of the original novels with a new staff.

== Analysis ==
Tanaka intentionally wanted to create a setting in which instead of a good vs. evil, black vs. white dichotomy there are two imperfect gray political entities in conflict with one another. He likened the former style to American works (e.g. Hollywood movies), and the latter, to Asian (e.g. Romance of the Three Kingdoms).

The entry in The Encyclopedia of Science Fiction notes that the series is a compendium of classic science fiction tropes: a sprawling Galactic Empire; massive Spaceships; a Death Star analogue in the form of the Iserlohn Fortress; manipulative Secret Masters; and grand conspiracies. Yet it subverts expectations: there are no aliens, and the drama is entirely human, focused on philosophy and politics. Warfare is depicted as ruinously costly: victories often come at a devastating price, and the horror of war is unflinchingly shown. Quiet debates on governance or courtroom trials can be as gripping as fleet battles.

== Reception and legacy ==
The Encyclopedia of Science Fiction notes that the series became a touchstone in Japan's science fiction community and earned an international cult reputation as "anime's greatest sci-fi epic", which the series turned into a form of animated literature – a sprawling, intellectually rich galactic saga destined to be retold for generations.

The series received several reviews in English media, years or even decades before its official release. It was reviewed for THEM Anime Reviews, where it received 5 out of 5 stars, with the reviewers noting that it is "a genuine classic", with "superb story" and "well-thought-out drama with engrossing characters".

The English debut of the novel series in 2016 was described as long-awaited and overdue. Publishers Weekly criticized the Daniel Huddleston's translation of the first novel, Dawn, stating it was "a slog". The novel as-a-whole was criticized for the "shallow" female characters. Rachel S. Cordasco, reviewing the novel series in Locus Magazine in 2020, praised the work as "a remarkable series... a multi-layered, multi-textual work [that] tells different stories on multiple levels", also observing that it is not just a space opera, but also, an "in-depth historiography" of the future military conflict, comparing it to the 18th-century historical work The History of the Decline and Fall of the Roman Empire.

In 2017, the 1988–1997 anime's official English release received a number of reviews in the English media. Anne Laurenroth of the Anime News Network gave a positive review, stating that despite its length, it has, arranged well in advance, "one of the most satisfying anime endings ever written". Daryl Surat, writing for Otaku Magazine, called the series "anime's greatest sci-fi epic".

Takumi Sato noted that the character of Reinhard von Lohengramm as depicted in the anime could be related to the "aestheticization of Hitler's image", comparing this phenomenon to similar Japanese works, such as Space Battleship Yamato.

The series has been described as "highly influential" in the development of Chinese online literature.

The historiographical aspects of the show have been analyzed by a Polish scholar, Arkadiusz Bożejewicz.
